= Meanings of minor-planet names: 136001–137000 =

As minor planet discoveries are confirmed, they are given a permanent number by the IAU's Minor Planet Center (MPC), and the discoverers can then submit names for them, following the IAU's naming conventions. The list below concerns those minor planets in the specified number-range that have received names, and explains the meanings of those names.

Official naming citations of newly named small Solar System bodies are approved and published in a bulletin by IAU's Working Group for Small Bodies Nomenclature (WGSBN). Before May 2021, citations were published in MPC's Minor Planet Circulars for many decades. Recent citations can also be found on the JPL Small-Body Database (SBDB). Until his death in 2016, German astronomer Lutz D. Schmadel compiled these citations into the Dictionary of Minor Planet Names (DMP) and regularly updated the collection.

Based on Paul Herget's The Names of the Minor Planets, Schmadel also researched the unclear origin of numerous asteroids, most of which had been named prior to World War II. This article incorporates text from this source, which is in the public domain: SBDB New namings may only be added to this list below after official publication as the preannouncement of names is condemned. The WGSBN publishes a comprehensive guideline for the naming rules of non-cometary small Solar System bodies.

== 136001–136100 ==
Named minor planet	Provisional	This minor planet was named for...	Ref · Catalog
136100 Angelamisiano	2003 DW_{12}	Angela Misiano (born 1944), Italian high-school mathematics and physics teacher and a university physics professor.	JPL · 136100

== 136101–136200 ==
back to top

Named minor planet	Provisional	This minor planet was named for...	Ref · Catalog
136108 Haumea	2003 EL_{61}	Haumea, Hawaiian goddess of childbirth and fertility, a personification of stone, and two of her daughters, Hiʻiaka and Namaka (Src)	JPL · 136108
136197 Johnandrews	2003 UH_{287}	John P. Andrews (born 1963) is a research and development director for Southwest Research Institute in Boulder, Colorado. He served as the Project Manager for the New Horizons mission to Pluto.	JPL · 136197
136199 Eris	2003 UB_{313}	Eris, from Greek mythology, the goddess of discord and strife. The dwarf planet's moon, (136199) Eris I Dysnomia, is named after her daughter (Src).	MPC · 136199

== 136201–136300 ==
back to top

Named minor planet	Provisional	This minor planet was named for...	Ref · Catalog
136273 Csermely	2003 YT_{107}	Péter Csermely (born 1958) is a Hungarian biochemist, and network researcher. His major fields of study are the adaptation and learning of complex networks. In 1995 he launched a highly successful initiative, which provided research opportunities for more than 10 \, 000 gifted high school students.	JPL · 136273

== 136301–136400 ==
back to top

Named minor planet	Provisional	This minor planet was named for...	Ref · Catalog
136367 Gierlinger	2004 EU_{11}	Richard Gierlinger (born 1967), an Austrian amateur astronomer, telescope builder and discoverer of minor planets	JPL · 136367

== 136401–136500 ==
back to top

Named minor planet	Provisional	This minor planet was named for...	Ref · Catalog
136432 Allenlunsford	2005 EW_{20}	Allen Lunsford (born 1968) is the Visible and near InfraRed Spectrometer (OVIRS) algorithm lead, developing all instrument operation and calibration software, as well as testing for the OSIRIS-REx asteroid sample-return mission	JPL · 136432
136472 Makemake	2005 FY_{9}	Makemake, creator deity of the Rapa Nui mythology (Easter Island). The discovery team previously used the codename "Easterbunny" for this object (Src).	JPL · 136472
136473 Bakosgáspár	2005 GB	Gáspár Bakos (born 1976), Hungarian astrophysicist and father of HATNet, a network of telescopes that detects extrasolar planets and variable stars	JPL · 136473

== 136501–136600 ==
back to top

Named minor planet	Provisional	This minor planet was named for...	Ref · Catalog
136518 Opitz	2005 SF_{70}	Nándor Opitz (1922–1995), a Hungarian engineer, aviator and the first Hungarian FAI Diamond Badge glider pilot.	JPL · 136518
136557 Neleus	5214 T-2	Neleus, husband to Chloris and father of the Greek Nestor, banished with his other children to Messina and later killed by Heracles	JPL · 136557

== 136601–136700 ==
back to top

Named minor planet	Provisional	This minor planet was named for...	Ref · Catalog
136666 Seidel	1995 SE	Josef Seidel (1859–1935), and his son Frantíšek Seidel (1908–1997), photographers from Český Krumlov in the Czech Republic. Their work depicts both people and places of the southeast part of the Bohemian Forest (Šumava).	JPL · 136666

== 136701–136800 ==
back to top

Named minor planet	Provisional	This minor planet was named for...	Ref · Catalog
136743 Echigo	1995 WW_{1}	Echigo, a name of an old administrative area in Japan.	JPL · 136743
136795 Tatsunokingo	1997 BQ	Tatsuno Kingo (1854–1919) was a Japanese architect, born in Karatsu, Saga Prefecture. He was a leading Japanese modern architect, and he taught many students. He was best known as the designer of the Bank of Japan building (Tokyo) and Tokyo railway station.	IAU · 136795

== 136801–136900 ==
back to top

Named minor planet	Provisional	This minor planet was named for...	Ref · Catalog
136803 Calliemorgan	1997 EC_{3}	Callie Morgan Caruso (born 2009), granddaughter of American astronomer Jim Bruton who discovered this minor planet	JPL · 136803
136818 Selqet	1997 MW_{1}	Selqet, ancient Egyptian goddess of magic, protector of the other gods from the destroyer, Apep	JPL · 136818
136824 Nonamikeiko	1997 RJ_{5}	Keiko Nonami (born 1960), member of Matsue Astronomy Club	JPL · 136824
136825 Slawitschek	1997 SX_{3}	Rudolf Slawitschek (1880–1945) was a Prague-based German writer and jurist. He wrote the historical novel Hans Adam Löwenmacht (Pražský dobrodruh), the children's book Anastasius Katzenschlucker and Der blaue Herrgott (1927), which takes place in the landscape of Kleť Mountain and nearby Český Krumlov.	JPL · 136825
136848 Kevanpooler	1998 BF_{44}	Kevin Murphy (born 1949; pen name: Kevan Pooler), a British historian and author who helped track the WWII past of the father of Maura Tombelli who co-discovered this minor planet.	IAU · 136848

== 136901–137000 ==
back to top

Named minor planet	Provisional	This minor planet was named for...	Ref · Catalog
136922 Brianbauer	1998 HB_{152}	Brian A. Bauer (born 1982) is a senior systems engineer at the Johns Hopkins University Applied Physics Laboratory, who performed a leading role in fault protection and spacecraft autonomy for the New Horizons mission to Pluto.	JPL · 136922

back to top

Preceded by 135,001–136,000	Meanings of minor-planet names List of minor planets: 136,001–137,000	Succeeded by 137,001–138,000
