= Péter Csermely =

Hungarian biochemist

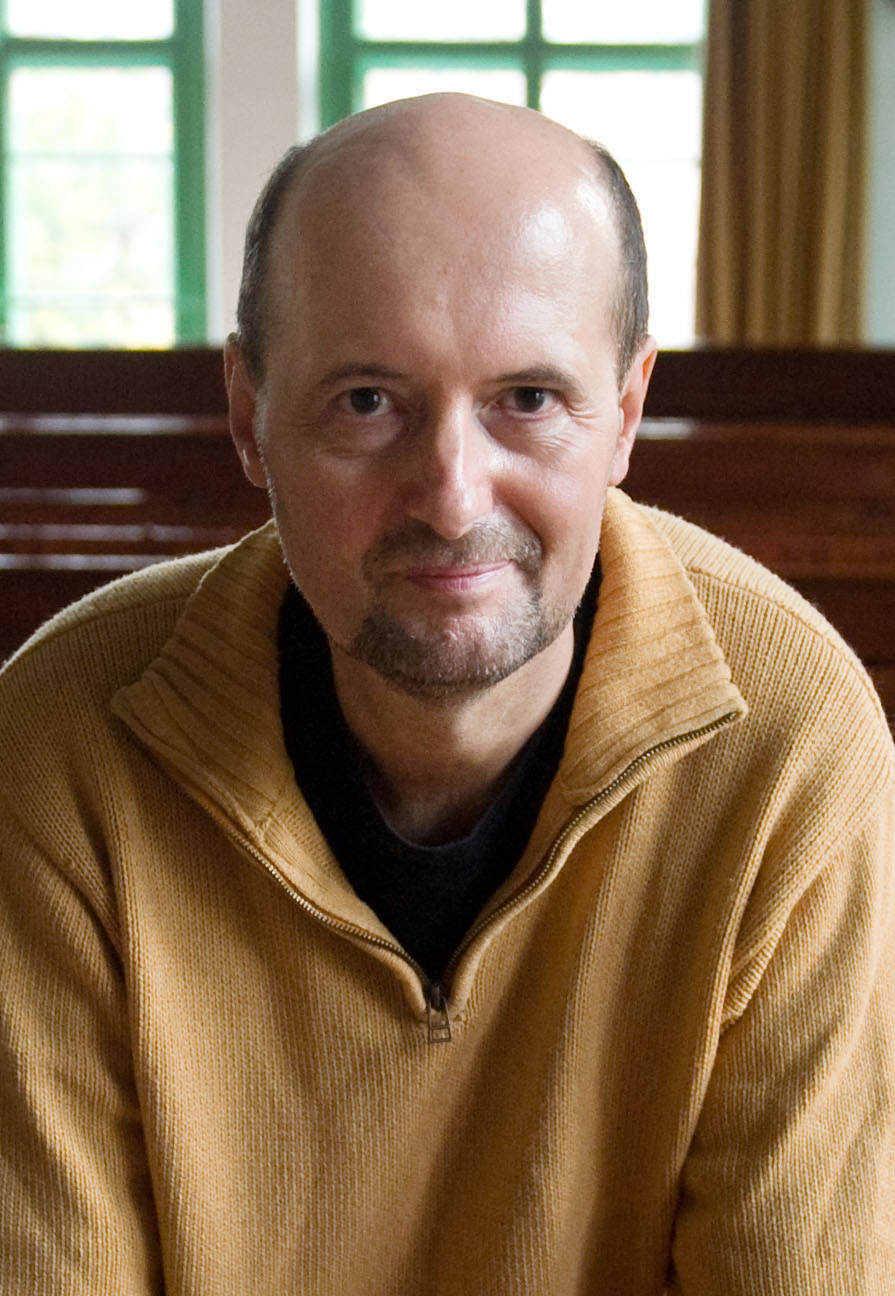
Peter Csermely

Peter Csermely (Budapest, 7 October 1958) is a Hungarian biochemist and professor at Semmelweis University (Budapest, Hungary). His major fields of study are the adaptation and learning of complex networks. In 1995 Csermely launched a highly successful initiative, which provided research opportunities for more than 10,000 gifted high school students. In 2006 he established the Hungarian Talent Support Council. From 2009 the council built up a nationwide talent support network involving more than 200,000 people by 2018. Between 2012 and 2020 he was the president of the European Council for High Ability . From 2014 they started to establish a European Talent Support Network having more than 400 cooperating organizations from more than 50 countries of Europe and from other continents in 2020.

== Biography ==
He graduated at ELTE Apáczai Csere János Secondary School. In 1977 he began his studies at Eötvös Loránd University, where he gained his honours MSc degree in chemistry. One year later he got a dr. univ. rer. nat. title in colloidal chemistry. In 1988 he received a PhD in biochemistry. In 1994 he obtained a Doctor of Science in cell biology and medicine. In 2022 he received an MA degree of theology/priesthood at the Lutheran University of Theology in Budapest, Hungary. Between 2018 and 2022 he was a member of the Congregational Council of his Lutheran Church in Budapest Angyalföld, which he served as a chairperson between 2020 and 2022. He was ordained as a Lutheran pastor in 2022, and serves the university students in Budapest, Hungary.

== Scholarships and other activities ==
Between 1984 and 1985 he was a researcher at New York State University; in 1986 and 1987 he continued his studies at the Hannover Medical School. From 1989 to 1991 he worked as a Fogarty Fellow at the Harvard. After his postdoctoral fellowship years he became an assistant, associate and full-time professor at the Semmelweis University. Between 1993 and 1997 he spent almost a year with research in Tokyo. In 2000 he was a visiting professor of the Paris Diderot University. In 2012 he was a scholar of the Rockefeller Foundation Bellagio Center. From 2012 he is a member of the Academia Europaea from 2013 he is a member of the Hungarian Academy of Sciences.

He was and is a member of several boards and committees of the Hungarian Science Foundation and the Hungarian Academy of Sciences. Between 2007 and 2009 he was the member of the Hungarian National Public Education Council. Between 2008 and 2010 he was a member of the Wise Persons' Council of the President of Hungary. He is a Fellow of Ashoka: Innovators for the Public.

His area of research area is related to the adaptation and learning of complex systems and their network descriptions. He is the author of 15 books and 250 scientific papers having over 22,000 Google Scholar citations . He served as an Editor of Cell Stress and Chaperones, PLoS ONE, Oxford University Press Journal of Complex Networks, and (Nature) Scientific Reports.

== Education ==
- Master of Science (honours degree) 1982 Eötvös Loránd Univ. Budapest (chemistry, pharmaceutical chemistry)
- Ph.D. (summa cum laude) 1983 Eötvös Loránd Univ. Budapest (colloidal chemistry, cell biology)
- Ph.D. (summa cum laude) 1988 Hungarian Academy of Sciences (biochemistry, immunochemistry)
- Habilitation: 1994 Semmelweis University (medicine, biochemistry)
- DSc. 1994 Hungarian Academy of Sciences (cell biology, medicine)

== Commissions and boards ==
Current

- 1993 - Member of the Committee on Cell and Developmental Biology of the Hungarian Academy of Sciences; from 2005 - Member of the Committee on Biochemistry and Molecular Biology of the Hungarian Academy of Sciences from 2020 - Member of the Bioinformatics Committee
- 2012 member of Academia Europaea
- 2013 member of the Hungarian Academy of Sciences (from 2019: regular member)
- 2015 - co-founder of Turbine Co .

Past

- 1986 - 96 Member of the Board of the Hungarian Society of Cell Biology (87-88, Acting Secretary; 93 - 96, Secretary of the Society)
- 1992 - 2001 Member of the Board of the Sümeg Membrane Symposia
- 1994 - 97, 2007-10 Board member of the Hungarian National Science Foundation
- 1994 - 1999 Chairman of the all-European COST network B5 on non-insulin dependent diabetes mellitus (NIDDM)
- 1995 - 2001 Trustee of the Hungarian National Academy of Sciences
- 1995 - 2015 Hungarian Biochemical Society (secretary general 1995–2005, vice-president, 2005–2015)
- 1996 - 2008 Trustee of the Pro Renovanda Cultura Hungariae Fund
- 1996 - 2005 Member of the Committee on Clinical and Experimental Oncology of the Hungarian Council of Health Sciences
- 1997 - 2002 Member of the Cell Biology Review Panel of the Hungarian Ministry of Education Science Fund, 2000-2002 chairman of the Panel
- 1998 - 2000 Member of the Research Council of Gedeon Richter Pharmaceuticals Ltd. Budapest
- 1999 - 2001 Founding Secretary/ Treasurer of Cell Stress Society International
- 1999 - 2007 editorial board member of Biogerontology
- 2000 - 2007 executive board member of the Hungarian National Student Research Council
- 2000 - 2005 Chairman of the all-European COST network B17 on diabetes, obesity and aging
- 2000 - 2010 Member and the editorial board of the journal "Physician Education"
- 2002 - 2008 Member of the Hungarian UNESCO Committee
- 2004 - 2008 Elected participant of the sessions of the Hungarian Academy of Sciences
- 2005 - 2007 President-elect, president and past president of Cell Stress Society International
- 2006 - 2016 founding president of the Hungarian Talent Support Council
- 2006 Member of EU Young Scientists High Level Expert Group
- 2007 - 2008 Member of the Hungarian National Council of Education
- 2008 - 2010 Member of the Wise Persons' Committee of the President of Hungary
- 2010 - 2017 Editor of PLoS ONE
- 2011 - 2017 Editor of Cell Stress and Chaperones
- 2011 - 2017 Editor of (Nature) Scientific Reports
- 2012 - 2017 Editor of Systema
- 2012 - 2017 Editor of Oxford University Press Journal of Complex Networks
- 2012 Guest Editor of Seminars in Cancer Biology
- 2012 Guest Editor of Current Topics of Medical Chemistry
- 2012 - 2014 Editor of PeerJ
- 2012 - 2020 president of European Council for High Ability (2 terms)
- 2013 - 2015 co-founder and member of the advisory board of Dzzom Co.
- 2014 - 2016 member of the advisory board of CX-Ray Co .
- 2015 - 2019 member of the selection committee for the Rockefeller Foundation Bellagio Center's resident fellows program

== Honors and awards ==
Major international awards

- 1976 8th International Olympics of Chemistry, silver medal
- 1995 Howard Hughes International Research Scholar's Award
- 2001 Ashoka Fellow
- 2003 EMBO (European Molecular Biology Organization) Science Communication Award
- 2004 Descartes Prize of Science Communication (top prize of the European Union)
- 2012 Rockefeller Scholar at Bellagio
- 2019 Széchenyi Award (major Hungarian scientific award)

Other honors and awards

- 1976 Apáczai Commemorative Medal
- National Chemical Competition, 2nd place
- 1977-1980 1st-3rd National Competition of Organic Chemistry, 2nd, 3rd places
- 9th, 10th International Competition of Analytical Chemistry, 2nd, 3rd places
- 1980-1982 National Scholarship of Higher Education
- 1981 Outstanding student of the Eötvös Loránd University
- 1983 Outstanding student of the Hungarian Higher Education
- 1986 Tankó Award of the Hungarian Biochemical Society
- 1988 Celebrity of the Week – Hungarian TV, channel 1
- 1989 Presidential Silver Medal of Outstanding Work
- 1996 Niveau Prize of the Hungarian journal, Nature
- 1996 Tivadar Huzella Award for the best science investigator of the Semmelweis University
- 1997 Széchenyi Award of Outstanding Hungarian Professors
- 1998 Best Science Educator of the Semmelweis University
- 1998 First BioTul Young Scientist Award
- 1999 Niveau Prize of the Hungarian journal, Nature
- 2002 Peter Pazmany Award (Pro Cultura Hungariae Fund)
- 2002 Anyos Jedlik Award (Hungarian Patent Office)
- 2002 Markusovszky Award for the best 2001 paper of the Hungarian Medical Weekly
- 2004 Best science communicator of the year (science journalist prize of Hungary)
- 2005 The Order of the Republic of Hungary, Knight's Cross
- 2005 Golden Owl Award of the Hungarian National Student Research Council
- 2006 Példakép Award for being a role model in Hungary
- 2009 Master-teacher, an award for being an outstanding mentor of undergraduates
- 2009 Pro Talento (a golden pin for outstanding talent support)
- 2010 the talent support activity becomes a part of the national heritage of Hungary
- 2010 Széchenyi Society award
- 2011 Spirit of Budapest Award of the Cell Stress Society International
- 2011 Márai Award: the Hungarian translation of Weak Links has been selected as one of the best 250 non-fiction books in Hungary recommended to all Hungarian libraries
- 2011 Prima Award
- 2012 Merit Award of the Semmelweis University
- 2012 In memoriam Denes Gabor Award
- 2013 International Award for Creativity of the World Council for Gifted and Talented Children
- 2016 For Serving the talented people (lifetime achievement award of the Hungarian Talent Support Council)
- 2017 Cell Stress Society International: Senior Fellow
- 2018 Bona Bonis Lifetime Achievement Award (for participation in Hungarian talent support)
- 2018 Asteroid 136273 Csermely, discovered by Krisztián Sárneczky at the Piszkéstető Station in 2003, was named in his honor.

== Publications and references ==
- Stress of Life from Molecules to Man (auth., 1998; auth. 2007)
- Research and Publication in Natural Sciences (in Hungarian) (co-author, 1999)
- Stress Proteins (in Hungarian) (2001)
- Science Education: Recruitment and Public Understanding (auth. 2003; auth. 2005; auth. 2007)
- The strength of hidden networks (in Hungarian) (2005) -- in 2011 selected as one of the best 250 non-fiction Hungarian books recommended to all Hungarian libraries
- Weak Links (2006, paperback: 2009)
- Wings and Weights (also in Hungarian) (2010)
- Enchanted by networks -- (interview book in Hungarian) (2010)
- My (blog)network life philosophy—best parts of http://csermelyblog.tehetsegpont.hu, (Csermelyblog 1.0) a Hungarian language science blog having more than a million downloads in its first 2 years (2012)
- Inauguration lecture at the Hungarian Academy of Sciences (2014)
- Interview about the eight years as the president of the European Council for High Ability (2020)

== Current research support ==
- National Science Foundation (Hungary, OTKA F5534; T17720; T25206; T37357, K69105, K83314, K115378, K131458) Adaptation of biological networks. 40 kEUR/year, 1992–2023, principal investigator.
- Hungarian Program of Excellence in Higher Education 2018–21, 20 kEUR/year, co-investigator
- Hungarian Program of Excellence in Higher Education in artificial intelligence development 2019–21, 80 kEUR/year, co-investigator
