= Pražský dobrodruh =

Novel by Rudolf Slawitschek

Pražský dobrodruh, podivuhodná historie Hanuše Adama Löwenmachta (Prague Adventurer: the marvelous story of Hans Adam Löwenmacht), originally published in German as Hans Adam Löwenmacht, phantastischer Roman aus der Barockzeit, is an adventure novel, described as a "Baroque novel", by Rudolf Slawitschek, a Czech writer who wrote in German. It is the author's best-known work and won the Prague City Prize in 1940. The adventure novel takes place in the historical city of Prague.

The first German edition was published by Rudolf M. Rohrer Verlag in 1939 a Czech-language version was first published in 1942 by Josef R. Vilímek publishing house, translated by S. Möcklová. The cover illustration of the novel was created by Zdeněk Guth.

The second Czech edition of the novel in 1943 was affected by the linguistic regulations of the occupation administration. The most significant manifestation was the ban on the translation of German city names into Czech.
