= List of minor planets: 136001–137000 =

The following is a partial list of minor planets, running from minor-planet number 136001 through 137000, inclusive. The primary data for this and other partial lists is based on JPL's "Small-Body Orbital Elements" and data available from the Minor Planet Center. Critical list information is also provided by the MPC, unless otherwise specified from Lowell Observatory. A detailed description of the table's columns and additional sources are given on the main page including a complete list of every page in this series, and a statistical break-up on the dynamical classification of minor planets.

Also see the summary list of all named bodies in numerical and alphabetical order, and the corresponding naming citations for the number range of this particular list. New namings may only be added to this list after official publication, as the preannouncement of names is condemned by the Working Group for Small Bodies Nomenclature of the International Astronomical Union.

Near-Earth obj.	MBA (inner)	MBA (outer)	Centaur
Mars-crosser	MBA (middle)	Jupiter trojan	Trans-Neptunian obj.
Unclassified

== 136001–136100 ==
Designation			Discovery			Properties		Ref
Permanent	Provisional	Named after	Date	Site	Discoverer(s)	Category	Diam.	Ref
136001	2002 VS_{43}	—	November 4, 2002	Palomar	NEAT	·	4.2 km	MPC · JPL
136002	2002 VZ_{43}	—	November 4, 2002	Palomar	NEAT	ADE	6.2 km	MPC · JPL
136003	2002 VB_{53}	—	November 6, 2002	Socorro	LINEAR	·	3.8 km	MPC · JPL
136004	2002 VR_{55}	—	November 6, 2002	Socorro	LINEAR	·	2.9 km	MPC · JPL
136005	2002 VB_{56}	—	November 6, 2002	Anderson Mesa	LONEOS	NEM	3.8 km	MPC · JPL
136006	2002 VR_{56}	—	November 6, 2002	Anderson Mesa	LONEOS	·	1.4 km	MPC · JPL
136007	2002 VU_{59}	—	November 3, 2002	Haleakala	NEAT	·	3.7 km	MPC · JPL
136008	2002 VB_{60}	—	November 3, 2002	Haleakala	NEAT	·	2.6 km	MPC · JPL
136009	2002 VM_{61}	—	November 5, 2002	Socorro	LINEAR	·	2.9 km	MPC · JPL
136010	2002 VJ_{63}	—	November 6, 2002	Anderson Mesa	LONEOS	·	2.0 km	MPC · JPL
136011	2002 VB_{64}	—	November 6, 2002	Anderson Mesa	LONEOS	·	4.0 km	MPC · JPL
136012	2002 VG_{64}	—	November 6, 2002	Socorro	LINEAR	·	4.8 km	MPC · JPL
136013	2002 VP_{66}	—	November 6, 2002	Socorro	LINEAR	·	2.5 km	MPC · JPL
136014	2002 VV_{67}	—	November 7, 2002	Socorro	LINEAR	·	2.6 km	MPC · JPL
136015	2002 VT_{68}	—	November 7, 2002	Anderson Mesa	LONEOS	·	8.5 km	MPC · JPL
136016	2002 VQ_{71}	—	November 7, 2002	Socorro	LINEAR	·	4.0 km	MPC · JPL
136017	2002 VH_{74}	—	November 7, 2002	Socorro	LINEAR	KOR	2.7 km	MPC · JPL
136018	2002 VP_{76}	—	November 7, 2002	Socorro	LINEAR	·	4.0 km	MPC · JPL
136019	2002 VP_{77}	—	November 7, 2002	Socorro	LINEAR	AGN	2.5 km	MPC · JPL
136020	2002 VM_{81}	—	November 7, 2002	Socorro	LINEAR	·	1.3 km	MPC · JPL
136021	2002 VR_{82}	—	November 7, 2002	Socorro	LINEAR	·	5.3 km	MPC · JPL
136022	2002 VV_{82}	—	November 7, 2002	Socorro	LINEAR	·	5.3 km	MPC · JPL
136023	2002 VW_{85}	—	November 11, 2002	Socorro	LINEAR	T_{j} (2.99)	9.0 km	MPC · JPL
136024	2002 VK_{87}	—	November 8, 2002	Socorro	LINEAR	·	5.4 km	MPC · JPL
136025	2002 VH_{88}	—	November 11, 2002	Socorro	LINEAR	PAD	3.7 km	MPC · JPL
136026	2002 VY_{96}	—	November 12, 2002	Anderson Mesa	LONEOS	·	4.4 km	MPC · JPL
136027	2002 VS_{100}	—	November 11, 2002	Anderson Mesa	LONEOS	·	2.7 km	MPC · JPL
136028	2002 VR_{101}	—	November 11, 2002	Socorro	LINEAR	EUP	6.4 km	MPC · JPL
136029	2002 VU_{104}	—	November 12, 2002	Socorro	LINEAR	MRX	1.7 km	MPC · JPL
136030	2002 VV_{104}	—	November 12, 2002	Socorro	LINEAR	·	4.1 km	MPC · JPL
136031	2002 VK_{109}	—	November 12, 2002	Socorro	LINEAR	·	4.3 km	MPC · JPL
136032	2002 VP_{110}	—	November 12, 2002	Socorro	LINEAR	·	6.8 km	MPC · JPL
136033	2002 VM_{113}	—	November 13, 2002	Palomar	NEAT	·	3.4 km	MPC · JPL
136034	2002 VU_{117}	—	November 13, 2002	Socorro	LINEAR	GAL	3.3 km	MPC · JPL
136035	2002 VC_{120}	—	November 12, 2002	Socorro	LINEAR	·	5.0 km	MPC · JPL
136036	2002 VK_{122}	—	November 13, 2002	Palomar	NEAT	·	4.3 km	MPC · JPL
136037	2002 VG_{129}	—	November 6, 2002	Socorro	LINEAR	·	3.7 km	MPC · JPL
136038	2002 WR	—	November 20, 2002	Socorro	LINEAR	·	3.8 km	MPC · JPL
136039	2002 WR_{4}	—	November 21, 2002	Palomar	NEAT	·	5.0 km	MPC · JPL
136040	2002 WL_{7}	—	November 24, 2002	Palomar	NEAT	THM	5.3 km	MPC · JPL
136041	2002 WY_{11}	—	November 27, 2002	Anderson Mesa	LONEOS	·	4.8 km	MPC · JPL
136042	2002 WJ_{12}	—	November 27, 2002	Anderson Mesa	LONEOS	·	5.4 km	MPC · JPL
136043	2002 WB_{14}	—	November 28, 2002	Anderson Mesa	LONEOS	·	3.6 km	MPC · JPL
136044	2002 XH_{6}	—	December 1, 2002	Socorro	LINEAR	·	1.9 km	MPC · JPL
136045	2002 XK_{8}	—	December 2, 2002	Socorro	LINEAR	·	5.2 km	MPC · JPL
136046	2002 XW_{8}	—	December 2, 2002	Socorro	LINEAR	·	3.5 km	MPC · JPL
136047	2002 XK_{16}	—	December 3, 2002	Palomar	NEAT	·	4.0 km	MPC · JPL
136048	2002 XD_{17}	—	December 3, 2002	Palomar	NEAT	·	7.0 km	MPC · JPL
136049	2002 XN_{23}	—	December 5, 2002	Socorro	LINEAR	·	3.8 km	MPC · JPL
136050	2002 XH_{26}	—	December 2, 2002	Socorro	LINEAR	·	3.8 km	MPC · JPL
136051	2002 XF_{27}	—	December 5, 2002	Socorro	LINEAR	·	4.7 km	MPC · JPL
136052	2002 XL_{30}	—	December 6, 2002	Socorro	LINEAR	·	7.0 km	MPC · JPL
136053	2002 XQ_{30}	—	December 6, 2002	Socorro	LINEAR	·	2.7 km	MPC · JPL
136054	2002 XN_{33}	—	December 7, 2002	Palomar	NEAT	EUN	2.7 km	MPC · JPL
136055	2002 XR_{36}	—	December 6, 2002	Socorro	LINEAR	·	5.1 km	MPC · JPL
136056	2002 XQ_{49}	—	December 10, 2002	Socorro	LINEAR	·	3.6 km	MPC · JPL
136057	2002 XZ_{49}	—	December 10, 2002	Socorro	LINEAR	KOR	2.4 km	MPC · JPL
136058	2002 XH_{53}	—	December 10, 2002	Kitt Peak	Spacewatch	·	4.1 km	MPC · JPL
136059	2002 XV_{55}	—	December 10, 2002	Palomar	NEAT	·	7.5 km	MPC · JPL
136060	2002 XD_{73}	—	December 11, 2002	Socorro	LINEAR	·	7.1 km	MPC · JPL
136061	2002 XK_{75}	—	December 11, 2002	Socorro	LINEAR	·	2.9 km	MPC · JPL
136062	2002 XJ_{76}	—	December 11, 2002	Socorro	LINEAR	·	7.2 km	MPC · JPL
136063	2002 XC_{78}	—	December 11, 2002	Palomar	NEAT	·	7.5 km	MPC · JPL
136064	2002 XW_{83}	—	December 13, 2002	Palomar	NEAT	EUN	3.1 km	MPC · JPL
136065	2002 XD_{84}	—	December 13, 2002	Haleakala	NEAT	·	3.8 km	MPC · JPL
136066	2002 XU_{84}	—	December 11, 2002	Palomar	NEAT	·	5.4 km	MPC · JPL
136067	2002 XK_{88}	—	December 12, 2002	Socorro	LINEAR	·	3.0 km	MPC · JPL
136068	2002 XH_{93}	—	December 5, 2002	Socorro	LINEAR	HYG	5.5 km	MPC · JPL
136069	2002 XO_{98}	—	December 5, 2002	Socorro	LINEAR	KOR	2.3 km	MPC · JPL
136070	2002 XO_{102}	—	December 5, 2002	Socorro	LINEAR	·	3.9 km	MPC · JPL
136071	2002 XF_{106}	—	December 5, 2002	Socorro	LINEAR	TEL	2.4 km	MPC · JPL
136072	2002 YN	—	December 27, 2002	Anderson Mesa	LONEOS	·	3.6 km	MPC · JPL
136073	2002 YH_{6}	—	December 28, 2002	Needville	L. Casady, A. Cruz	·	7.5 km	MPC · JPL
136074	2002 YJ_{16}	—	December 31, 2002	Socorro	LINEAR	·	7.3 km	MPC · JPL
136075	2002 YD_{29}	—	December 31, 2002	Socorro	LINEAR	·	5.5 km	MPC · JPL
136076	2003 AC_{8}	—	January 3, 2003	Socorro	LINEAR	·	8.3 km	MPC · JPL
136077	2003 AP_{17}	—	January 4, 2003	Socorro	LINEAR	·	4.8 km	MPC · JPL
136078	2003 AH_{30}	—	January 4, 2003	Socorro	LINEAR	·	7.4 km	MPC · JPL
136079	2003 AR_{36}	—	January 7, 2003	Socorro	LINEAR	·	5.8 km	MPC · JPL
136080	2003 AQ_{49}	—	January 5, 2003	Socorro	LINEAR	slow	8.6 km	MPC · JPL
136081	2003 AH_{57}	—	January 5, 2003	Socorro	LINEAR	·	6.2 km	MPC · JPL
136082	2003 AH_{60}	—	January 5, 2003	Socorro	LINEAR	·	2.8 km	MPC · JPL
136083	2003 AY_{65}	—	January 7, 2003	Socorro	LINEAR	·	6.7 km	MPC · JPL
136084	2003 AE_{66}	—	January 7, 2003	Socorro	LINEAR	LUT	9.6 km	MPC · JPL
136085	2003 AQ_{74}	—	January 10, 2003	Socorro	LINEAR	·	6.0 km	MPC · JPL
136086	2003 AC_{77}	—	January 10, 2003	Socorro	LINEAR	·	3.7 km	MPC · JPL
136087	2003 AO_{86}	—	January 1, 2003	Socorro	LINEAR	·	7.6 km	MPC · JPL
136088	2003 BO_{7}	—	January 26, 2003	Palomar	NEAT	EUN	2.3 km	MPC · JPL
136089	2003 BG_{17}	—	January 26, 2003	Haleakala	NEAT	·	7.1 km	MPC · JPL
136090	2003 BZ_{28}	—	January 27, 2003	Socorro	LINEAR	·	4.1 km	MPC · JPL
136091	2003 BK_{31}	—	January 27, 2003	Socorro	LINEAR	·	7.0 km	MPC · JPL
136092	2003 BN_{36}	—	January 27, 2003	Socorro	LINEAR	·	8.8 km	MPC · JPL
136093	2003 BA_{48}	—	January 27, 2003	Socorro	LINEAR	·	1.3 km	MPC · JPL
136094	2003 BC_{51}	—	January 27, 2003	Socorro	LINEAR	fast	1.6 km	MPC · JPL
136095	2003 BG_{68}	—	January 27, 2003	Haleakala	NEAT	·	4.5 km	MPC · JPL
136096	2003 CV_{8}	—	February 1, 2003	Haleakala	NEAT	·	7.7 km	MPC · JPL
136097	2003 CS_{17}	—	February 6, 2003	Palomar	NEAT	EUN	2.4 km	MPC · JPL
136098	2003 DD	—	February 19, 2003	Haleakala	NEAT	·	3.2 km	MPC · JPL
136099	2003 DD_{4}	—	February 22, 2003	Palomar	NEAT	·	4.0 km	MPC · JPL
136100 Angelamisiano	2003 DW_{12}	Angelamisiano	February 26, 2003	Campo Imperatore	F. Bernardi	CYB	6.0 km	MPC · JPL

== 136101–136200 ==
back to top

Designation			Discovery			Properties		Ref
Permanent	Provisional	Named after	Date	Site	Discoverer(s)	Category	Diam.	Ref
136101	2003 EA_{2}	—	March 5, 2003	Socorro	LINEAR	·	7.8 km	MPC · JPL
136102	2003 EW_{2}	—	March 5, 2003	Socorro	LINEAR	·	3.8 km	MPC · JPL
136103	2003 EN_{22}	—	March 6, 2003	Socorro	LINEAR	GEF	2.4 km	MPC · JPL
136104	2003 EO_{22}	—	March 6, 2003	Socorro	LINEAR	·	6.6 km	MPC · JPL
136105	2003 EC_{27}	—	March 6, 2003	Anderson Mesa	LONEOS	NYS	1.9 km	MPC · JPL
136106	2003 EW_{33}	—	March 7, 2003	Anderson Mesa	LONEOS	·	2.1 km	MPC · JPL
136107	2003 EY_{58}	—	March 12, 2003	Palomar	NEAT	EUN	2.3 km	MPC · JPL
136108 Haumea	2003 EL_{61}	Haumea	March 7, 2003	Sierra Nevada	Sierra Nevada	Haumea · moon	1595 km	MPC · JPL
136109	2003 FA_{22}	—	March 25, 2003	Kitt Peak	Spacewatch	·	1.0 km	MPC · JPL
136110	2003 FZ_{60}	—	March 26, 2003	Palomar	NEAT	PAD	3.1 km	MPC · JPL
136111	2003 FC_{79}	—	March 27, 2003	Kitt Peak	Spacewatch	·	3.2 km	MPC · JPL
136112	2003 FY_{104}	—	March 26, 2003	Kitt Peak	Spacewatch	·	1.8 km	MPC · JPL
136113	2003 GA_{5}	—	April 1, 2003	Socorro	LINEAR	HYG	5.4 km	MPC · JPL
136114	2003 GU_{37}	—	April 7, 2003	Palomar	NEAT	·	980 m	MPC · JPL
136115	2003 HC_{3}	—	April 24, 2003	Anderson Mesa	LONEOS	·	4.0 km	MPC · JPL
136116	2003 HA_{16}	—	April 23, 2003	Socorro	LINEAR	H	1.0 km	MPC · JPL
136117	2003 HL_{28}	—	April 26, 2003	Haleakala	NEAT	H	950 m	MPC · JPL
136118	2003 KV	—	May 21, 2003	Reedy Creek	J. Broughton	·	2.9 km	MPC · JPL
136119	2003 KH_{19}	—	May 29, 2003	Socorro	LINEAR	·	3.2 km	MPC · JPL
136120	2003 LG_{7}	—	June 1, 2003	Cerro Tololo	M. W. Buie	res · 1:3	125 km	MPC · JPL
136121	2003 OA	—	July 18, 2003	Siding Spring	R. H. McNaught	·	860 m	MPC · JPL
136122	2003 OQ_{29}	—	July 24, 2003	Palomar	NEAT	·	1.6 km	MPC · JPL
136123	2003 QK_{40}	—	August 22, 2003	Socorro	LINEAR	·	1.7 km	MPC · JPL
136124	2003 QC_{56}	—	August 23, 2003	Socorro	LINEAR	NYS	1.9 km	MPC · JPL
136125	2003 QU_{65}	—	August 25, 2003	Palomar	NEAT	·	2.4 km	MPC · JPL
136126	2003 QN_{79}	—	August 26, 2003	Socorro	LINEAR	·	1.5 km	MPC · JPL
136127	2003 RA_{15}	—	September 14, 2003	Haleakala	NEAT	·	6.0 km	MPC · JPL
136128	2003 SO_{36}	—	September 17, 2003	Kitt Peak	Spacewatch	·	1.2 km	MPC · JPL
136129	2003 SL_{57}	—	September 16, 2003	Kitt Peak	Spacewatch	·	1.0 km	MPC · JPL
136130	2003 SH_{87}	—	September 17, 2003	Socorro	LINEAR	·	1.7 km	MPC · JPL
136131	2003 SE_{96}	—	September 19, 2003	Socorro	LINEAR	·	2.5 km	MPC · JPL
136132	2003 SC_{98}	—	September 19, 2003	Palomar	NEAT	·	1.9 km	MPC · JPL
136133	2003 SC_{110}	—	September 20, 2003	Palomar	NEAT	·	1.4 km	MPC · JPL
136134	2003 SY_{117}	—	September 16, 2003	Kitt Peak	Spacewatch	·	1.6 km	MPC · JPL
136135	2003 SN_{138}	—	September 20, 2003	Palomar	NEAT	·	1.1 km	MPC · JPL
136136	2003 ST_{147}	—	September 21, 2003	Kitt Peak	Spacewatch	·	1.4 km	MPC · JPL
136137	2003 SU_{188}	—	September 22, 2003	Anderson Mesa	LONEOS	·	3.8 km	MPC · JPL
136138	2003 SH_{199}	—	September 21, 2003	Anderson Mesa	LONEOS	·	1.4 km	MPC · JPL
136139	2003 SH_{201}	—	September 24, 2003	Socorro	LINEAR	PHO	2.6 km	MPC · JPL
136140	2003 SS_{220}	—	September 29, 2003	Desert Eagle	W. K. Y. Yeung	·	1.6 km	MPC · JPL
136141	2003 SM_{228}	—	September 26, 2003	Socorro	LINEAR	·	980 m	MPC · JPL
136142	2003 ST_{235}	—	September 27, 2003	Socorro	LINEAR	·	1.3 km	MPC · JPL
136143	2003 SQ_{251}	—	September 26, 2003	Socorro	LINEAR	·	1.6 km	MPC · JPL
136144	2003 SV_{288}	—	September 28, 2003	Socorro	LINEAR	·	1.3 km	MPC · JPL
136145	2003 SC_{291}	—	September 29, 2003	Socorro	LINEAR	·	1.3 km	MPC · JPL
136146	2003 SA_{294}	—	September 28, 2003	Socorro	LINEAR	·	1.0 km	MPC · JPL
136147	2003 SU_{296}	—	September 29, 2003	Anderson Mesa	LONEOS	·	2.7 km	MPC · JPL
136148	2003 SC_{306}	—	September 30, 2003	Socorro	LINEAR	·	1.5 km	MPC · JPL
136149	2003 SR_{313}	—	September 29, 2003	Goodricke-Pigott	Kessel, J. W.	·	1.2 km	MPC · JPL
136150	2003 TJ	—	October 2, 2003	Socorro	LINEAR	·	2.2 km	MPC · JPL
136151	2003 TM_{2}	—	October 1, 2003	Goodricke-Pigott	Kessel, J. W.	·	1.7 km	MPC · JPL
136152	2003 TQ_{12}	—	October 14, 2003	Anderson Mesa	LONEOS	·	1.3 km	MPC · JPL
136153	2003 TH_{13}	—	October 2, 2003	Haleakala	NEAT	PHO	1.8 km	MPC · JPL
136154	2003 TX_{14}	—	October 14, 2003	Anderson Mesa	LONEOS	·	1.3 km	MPC · JPL
136155	2003 TQ_{24}	—	October 1, 2003	Kitt Peak	Spacewatch	·	1.1 km	MPC · JPL
136156	2003 TX_{27}	—	October 1, 2003	Anderson Mesa	LONEOS	·	2.1 km	MPC · JPL
136157	2003 TQ_{39}	—	October 2, 2003	Kitt Peak	Spacewatch	·	1.3 km	MPC · JPL
136158	2003 UU_{14}	—	October 16, 2003	Kitt Peak	Spacewatch	V	1.1 km	MPC · JPL
136159	2003 UE_{15}	—	October 16, 2003	Kitt Peak	Spacewatch	·	1.0 km	MPC · JPL
136160	2003 UU_{15}	—	October 16, 2003	Anderson Mesa	LONEOS	·	1.2 km	MPC · JPL
136161	2003 US_{23}	—	October 22, 2003	Kitt Peak	Spacewatch	·	1.2 km	MPC · JPL
136162	2003 UR_{29}	—	October 21, 2003	Fountain Hills	Hills, Fountain	·	1.4 km	MPC · JPL
136163	2003 UY_{40}	—	October 16, 2003	Anderson Mesa	LONEOS	·	3.0 km	MPC · JPL
136164	2003 UO_{47}	—	October 24, 2003	Socorro	LINEAR	·	1.2 km	MPC · JPL
136165	2003 UQ_{48}	—	October 16, 2003	Anderson Mesa	LONEOS	·	2.9 km	MPC · JPL
136166	2003 UH_{73}	—	October 19, 2003	Kitt Peak	Spacewatch	·	4.8 km	MPC · JPL
136167	2003 UP_{85}	—	October 18, 2003	Kitt Peak	Spacewatch	·	1.2 km	MPC · JPL
136168	2003 UC_{98}	—	October 19, 2003	Anderson Mesa	LONEOS	·	2.2 km	MPC · JPL
136169	2003 UN_{109}	—	October 19, 2003	Kitt Peak	Spacewatch	·	1.2 km	MPC · JPL
136170	2003 UD_{118}	—	October 17, 2003	Anderson Mesa	LONEOS	·	3.2 km	MPC · JPL
136171	2003 UE_{119}	—	October 18, 2003	Kitt Peak	Spacewatch	AST	2.5 km	MPC · JPL
136172	2003 US_{123}	—	October 19, 2003	Kitt Peak	Spacewatch	·	2.7 km	MPC · JPL
136173	2003 UU_{129}	—	October 18, 2003	Palomar	NEAT	·	2.2 km	MPC · JPL
136174	2003 UJ_{132}	—	October 19, 2003	Palomar	NEAT	·	1.6 km	MPC · JPL
136175	2003 UV_{132}	—	October 19, 2003	Palomar	NEAT	V	1.2 km	MPC · JPL
136176	2003 UU_{141}	—	October 18, 2003	Anderson Mesa	LONEOS	·	3.2 km	MPC · JPL
136177	2003 UY_{143}	—	October 18, 2003	Anderson Mesa	LONEOS	·	1.3 km	MPC · JPL
136178	2003 UJ_{146}	—	October 18, 2003	Anderson Mesa	LONEOS	V	1.1 km	MPC · JPL
136179	2003 UE_{147}	—	October 18, 2003	Anderson Mesa	LONEOS	V	1.3 km	MPC · JPL
136180	2003 UJ_{183}	—	October 21, 2003	Palomar	NEAT	·	1.2 km	MPC · JPL
136181	2003 UB_{199}	—	October 21, 2003	Socorro	LINEAR	·	1.0 km	MPC · JPL
136182	2003 UE_{202}	—	October 21, 2003	Kitt Peak	Spacewatch	MAS	960 m	MPC · JPL
136183	2003 UH_{208}	—	October 22, 2003	Socorro	LINEAR	·	5.8 km	MPC · JPL
136184	2003 UV_{209}	—	October 23, 2003	Anderson Mesa	LONEOS	·	1.4 km	MPC · JPL
136185	2003 UH_{210}	—	October 23, 2003	Anderson Mesa	LONEOS	·	2.0 km	MPC · JPL
136186	2003 UV_{210}	—	October 23, 2003	Kitt Peak	Spacewatch	V	1.1 km	MPC · JPL
136187	2003 UP_{218}	—	October 21, 2003	Socorro	LINEAR	·	1.8 km	MPC · JPL
136188	2003 UC_{232}	—	October 24, 2003	Kitt Peak	Spacewatch	KOR	1.4 km	MPC · JPL
136189	2003 UT_{237}	—	October 23, 2003	Kitt Peak	Spacewatch	·	1.5 km	MPC · JPL
136190	2003 UU_{243}	—	October 24, 2003	Socorro	LINEAR	·	1.3 km	MPC · JPL
136191	2003 UU_{247}	—	October 24, 2003	Haleakala	NEAT	V	1.0 km	MPC · JPL
136192	2003 UT_{253}	—	October 22, 2003	Palomar	NEAT	PHO	1.9 km	MPC · JPL
136193	2003 UX_{256}	—	October 25, 2003	Socorro	LINEAR	·	1.5 km	MPC · JPL
136194	2003 UX_{267}	—	October 28, 2003	Socorro	LINEAR	·	1.2 km	MPC · JPL
136195	2003 UU_{276}	—	October 30, 2003	Socorro	LINEAR	·	2.6 km	MPC · JPL
136196	2003 UF_{279}	—	October 26, 2003	Socorro	LINEAR	·	1.3 km	MPC · JPL
136197 Johnandrews	2003 UH_{287}	Johnandrews	October 22, 2003	Kitt Peak	M. W. Buie	·	1.2 km	MPC · JPL
136198	2003 UJ_{296}	—	October 16, 2003	Kitt Peak	Spacewatch	AST	4.2 km	MPC · JPL
136199 Eris	2003 UB_{313}	Eris	October 21, 2003	Palomar	M. E. Brown, C. A. Trujillo, D. L. Rabinowitz	SDO · moon	2326 km	MPC · JPL
136200	2003 VS_{5}	—	November 15, 2003	Kitt Peak	Spacewatch	·	2.4 km	MPC · JPL

== 136201–136300 ==
back to top

Designation			Discovery			Properties		Ref
Permanent	Provisional	Named after	Date	Site	Discoverer(s)	Category	Diam.	Ref
136201	2003 VM_{8}	—	November 15, 2003	Palomar	NEAT	·	950 m	MPC · JPL
136202	2003 WY_{3}	—	November 18, 2003	Palomar	NEAT	·	1.6 km	MPC · JPL
136203	2003 WD_{6}	—	November 18, 2003	Palomar	NEAT	·	1.6 km	MPC · JPL
136204	2003 WL_{7}	—	November 16, 2003	Kitt Peak	Spacewatch	centaur	118 km	MPC · JPL
136205	2003 WM_{10}	—	November 18, 2003	Kitt Peak	Spacewatch	·	1.7 km	MPC · JPL
136206	2003 WN_{19}	—	November 19, 2003	Socorro	LINEAR	·	1.5 km	MPC · JPL
136207	2003 WW_{19}	—	November 19, 2003	Socorro	LINEAR	(2076)	1.5 km	MPC · JPL
136208	2003 WD_{20}	—	November 19, 2003	Socorro	LINEAR	·	1.5 km	MPC · JPL
136209	2003 WF_{20}	—	November 19, 2003	Socorro	LINEAR	·	1.7 km	MPC · JPL
136210	2003 WG_{30}	—	November 18, 2003	Kitt Peak	Spacewatch	·	2.0 km	MPC · JPL
136211	2003 WN_{33}	—	November 18, 2003	Palomar	NEAT	V	1.1 km	MPC · JPL
136212	2003 WA_{35}	—	November 19, 2003	Kitt Peak	Spacewatch	·	1.5 km	MPC · JPL
136213	2003 WJ_{50}	—	November 19, 2003	Socorro	LINEAR	EUN	2.1 km	MPC · JPL
136214	2003 WM_{50}	—	November 19, 2003	Socorro	LINEAR	·	1.4 km	MPC · JPL
136215	2003 WK_{61}	—	November 19, 2003	Kitt Peak	Spacewatch	·	2.4 km	MPC · JPL
136216	2003 WK_{71}	—	November 20, 2003	Socorro	LINEAR	·	1.3 km	MPC · JPL
136217	2003 WK_{72}	—	November 20, 2003	Socorro	LINEAR	·	1.4 km	MPC · JPL
136218	2003 WR_{73}	—	November 20, 2003	Socorro	LINEAR	·	1.3 km	MPC · JPL
136219	2003 WZ_{76}	—	November 19, 2003	Palomar	NEAT	·	3.6 km	MPC · JPL
136220	2003 WO_{78}	—	November 20, 2003	Socorro	LINEAR	·	1.7 km	MPC · JPL
136221	2003 WW_{80}	—	November 20, 2003	Socorro	LINEAR	·	1.2 km	MPC · JPL
136222	2003 WE_{82}	—	November 19, 2003	Socorro	LINEAR	·	1.4 km	MPC · JPL
136223	2003 WL_{84}	—	November 19, 2003	Catalina	CSS	V	1.1 km	MPC · JPL
136224	2003 WH_{86}	—	November 21, 2003	Socorro	LINEAR	·	2.1 km	MPC · JPL
136225	2003 WJ_{99}	—	November 20, 2003	Socorro	LINEAR	·	2.3 km	MPC · JPL
136226	2003 WH_{100}	—	November 20, 2003	Socorro	LINEAR	V	990 m	MPC · JPL
136227	2003 WZ_{103}	—	November 21, 2003	Socorro	LINEAR	·	1.2 km	MPC · JPL
136228	2003 WN_{106}	—	November 21, 2003	Socorro	LINEAR	·	2.2 km	MPC · JPL
136229	2003 WG_{112}	—	November 20, 2003	Socorro	LINEAR	·	2.8 km	MPC · JPL
136230	2003 WC_{117}	—	November 20, 2003	Socorro	LINEAR	·	2.1 km	MPC · JPL
136231	2003 WH_{118}	—	November 20, 2003	Socorro	LINEAR	·	1.7 km	MPC · JPL
136232	2003 WH_{119}	—	November 20, 2003	Socorro	LINEAR	·	1.5 km	MPC · JPL
136233	2003 WX_{120}	—	November 20, 2003	Socorro	LINEAR	·	1.4 km	MPC · JPL
136234	2003 WA_{121}	—	November 20, 2003	Socorro	LINEAR	·	1.7 km	MPC · JPL
136235	2003 WL_{122}	—	November 20, 2003	Kitt Peak	Spacewatch	·	2.6 km	MPC · JPL
136236	2003 WP_{137}	—	November 21, 2003	Socorro	LINEAR	·	1.5 km	MPC · JPL
136237	2003 WU_{141}	—	November 21, 2003	Socorro	LINEAR	·	3.5 km	MPC · JPL
136238	2003 WX_{141}	—	November 21, 2003	Socorro	LINEAR	·	1.9 km	MPC · JPL
136239	2003 WG_{142}	—	November 21, 2003	Socorro	LINEAR	·	1.4 km	MPC · JPL
136240	2003 WY_{143}	—	November 21, 2003	Palomar	NEAT	·	2.1 km	MPC · JPL
136241	2003 WM_{170}	—	November 20, 2003	Socorro	LINEAR	·	1.8 km	MPC · JPL
136242	2003 XZ	—	December 1, 2003	Kitt Peak	Spacewatch	·	1.3 km	MPC · JPL
136243	2003 XY_{2}	—	December 1, 2003	Socorro	LINEAR	·	1.5 km	MPC · JPL
136244	2003 XV_{3}	—	December 1, 2003	Socorro	LINEAR	·	1.9 km	MPC · JPL
136245	2003 XE_{4}	—	December 1, 2003	Socorro	LINEAR	·	1.2 km	MPC · JPL
136246	2003 XN_{5}	—	December 3, 2003	Anderson Mesa	LONEOS	·	1.6 km	MPC · JPL
136247	2003 XU_{5}	—	December 3, 2003	Socorro	LINEAR	·	1.1 km	MPC · JPL
136248	2003 XK_{9}	—	December 4, 2003	Socorro	LINEAR	·	2.9 km	MPC · JPL
136249	2003 XP_{15}	—	December 3, 2003	Socorro	LINEAR	·	1.4 km	MPC · JPL
136250	2003 XP_{16}	—	December 14, 2003	Palomar	NEAT	·	1.9 km	MPC · JPL
136251	2003 XD_{19}	—	December 14, 2003	Palomar	NEAT	·	1.3 km	MPC · JPL
136252	2003 XX_{34}	—	December 3, 2003	Anderson Mesa	LONEOS	·	2.4 km	MPC · JPL
136253	2003 XA_{39}	—	December 4, 2003	Socorro	LINEAR	·	2.3 km	MPC · JPL
136254	2003 YL_{7}	—	December 17, 2003	Palomar	NEAT	EUN	2.7 km	MPC · JPL
136255	2003 YE_{18}	—	December 16, 2003	Catalina	CSS	·	1.3 km	MPC · JPL
136256	2003 YS_{31}	—	December 18, 2003	Socorro	LINEAR	·	2.3 km	MPC · JPL
136257	2003 YR_{37}	—	December 18, 2003	Kitt Peak	Spacewatch	MAS	1.0 km	MPC · JPL
136258	2003 YQ_{43}	—	December 19, 2003	Socorro	LINEAR	·	1.8 km	MPC · JPL
136259	2003 YH_{45}	—	December 17, 2003	Bergisch Gladbach	W. Bickel	·	1.8 km	MPC · JPL
136260	2003 YV_{58}	—	December 19, 2003	Socorro	LINEAR	·	2.2 km	MPC · JPL
136261	2003 YO_{60}	—	December 19, 2003	Kitt Peak	Spacewatch	·	1.3 km	MPC · JPL
136262	2003 YV_{64}	—	December 19, 2003	Socorro	LINEAR	MAS	1.6 km	MPC · JPL
136263	2003 YR_{68}	—	December 19, 2003	Socorro	LINEAR	·	3.6 km	MPC · JPL
136264	2003 YC_{70}	—	December 21, 2003	Socorro	LINEAR	·	5.5 km	MPC · JPL
136265	2003 YN_{71}	—	December 18, 2003	Socorro	LINEAR	EUN	2.5 km	MPC · JPL
136266	2003 YV_{74}	—	December 18, 2003	Socorro	LINEAR	·	5.7 km	MPC · JPL
136267	2003 YR_{80}	—	December 18, 2003	Socorro	LINEAR	LIX	10 km	MPC · JPL
136268	2003 YB_{83}	—	December 18, 2003	Kitt Peak	Spacewatch	·	2.3 km	MPC · JPL
136269	2003 YQ_{87}	—	December 19, 2003	Socorro	LINEAR	·	3.0 km	MPC · JPL
136270	2003 YP_{89}	—	December 19, 2003	Kitt Peak	Spacewatch	·	3.5 km	MPC · JPL
136271	2003 YT_{95}	—	December 19, 2003	Socorro	LINEAR	·	2.2 km	MPC · JPL
136272	2003 YF_{107}	—	December 22, 2003	Kitt Peak	Spacewatch	KOR	2.7 km	MPC · JPL
136273 Csermely	2003 YT_{107}	Csermely	December 25, 2003	Piszkéstető	K. Sárneczky	·	1.4 km	MPC · JPL
136274	2003 YO_{111}	—	December 23, 2003	Socorro	LINEAR	·	2.8 km	MPC · JPL
136275	2003 YM_{113}	—	December 23, 2003	Socorro	LINEAR	·	2.5 km	MPC · JPL
136276	2003 YZ_{123}	—	December 28, 2003	Socorro	LINEAR	·	1.8 km	MPC · JPL
136277	2003 YL_{125}	—	December 27, 2003	Socorro	LINEAR	·	1.4 km	MPC · JPL
136278	2003 YO_{125}	—	December 27, 2003	Socorro	LINEAR	PHO	2.6 km	MPC · JPL
136279	2003 YU_{125}	—	December 27, 2003	Socorro	LINEAR	·	1.4 km	MPC · JPL
136280	2003 YW_{125}	—	December 27, 2003	Kitt Peak	Spacewatch	·	1.8 km	MPC · JPL
136281	2003 YY_{128}	—	December 27, 2003	Socorro	LINEAR	·	3.3 km	MPC · JPL
136282	2003 YZ_{129}	—	December 27, 2003	Socorro	LINEAR	·	1.9 km	MPC · JPL
136283	2003 YE_{130}	—	December 27, 2003	Socorro	LINEAR	·	7.1 km	MPC · JPL
136284	2003 YY_{134}	—	December 28, 2003	Socorro	LINEAR	·	4.2 km	MPC · JPL
136285	2003 YF_{140}	—	December 28, 2003	Kitt Peak	Spacewatch	EOS	3.0 km	MPC · JPL
136286	2003 YG_{146}	—	December 28, 2003	Socorro	LINEAR	·	3.6 km	MPC · JPL
136287	2003 YR_{151}	—	December 29, 2003	Socorro	LINEAR	·	2.7 km	MPC · JPL
136288	2004 AZ_{1}	—	January 13, 2004	Anderson Mesa	LONEOS	·	3.3 km	MPC · JPL
136289	2004 AY_{2}	—	January 3, 2004	Socorro	LINEAR	HNS	3.1 km	MPC · JPL
136290	2004 AH_{6}	—	January 13, 2004	Palomar	NEAT	EOS	2.9 km	MPC · JPL
136291	2004 AV_{9}	—	January 15, 2004	Kitt Peak	Spacewatch	THM	4.7 km	MPC · JPL
136292	2004 AU_{10}	—	January 15, 2004	Kitt Peak	Spacewatch	(12739)	3.1 km	MPC · JPL
136293	2004 AG_{14}	—	January 13, 2004	Kitt Peak	Spacewatch	EUP	5.8 km	MPC · JPL
136294	2004 AK_{26}	—	January 13, 2004	Palomar	NEAT	·	1.5 km	MPC · JPL
136295	2004 BF_{2}	—	January 16, 2004	Palomar	NEAT	·	1.4 km	MPC · JPL
136296	2004 BR_{2}	—	January 16, 2004	Palomar	NEAT	NYS	1.9 km	MPC · JPL
136297	2004 BN_{9}	—	January 16, 2004	Palomar	NEAT	EOS	3.9 km	MPC · JPL
136298	2004 BP_{9}	—	January 16, 2004	Palomar	NEAT	·	1.9 km	MPC · JPL
136299	2004 BU_{13}	—	January 17, 2004	Palomar	NEAT	·	3.5 km	MPC · JPL
136300	2004 BU_{14}	—	January 16, 2004	Palomar	NEAT	HOF	5.5 km	MPC · JPL

== 136301–136400 ==
back to top

Designation			Discovery			Properties		Ref
Permanent	Provisional	Named after	Date	Site	Discoverer(s)	Category	Diam.	Ref
136301	2004 BX_{14}	—	January 16, 2004	Palomar	NEAT	·	2.4 km	MPC · JPL
136302	2004 BL_{19}	—	January 17, 2004	Palomar	NEAT	·	2.3 km	MPC · JPL
136303	2004 BC_{23}	—	January 17, 2004	Palomar	NEAT	·	1.7 km	MPC · JPL
136304	2004 BB_{24}	—	January 19, 2004	Anderson Mesa	LONEOS	TEL	2.2 km	MPC · JPL
136305	2004 BA_{34}	—	January 19, 2004	Kitt Peak	Spacewatch	HOF	5.6 km	MPC · JPL
136306	2004 BF_{35}	—	January 19, 2004	Kitt Peak	Spacewatch	·	3.2 km	MPC · JPL
136307	2004 BX_{43}	—	January 22, 2004	Socorro	LINEAR	NYS	2.1 km	MPC · JPL
136308	2004 BK_{44}	—	January 22, 2004	Socorro	LINEAR	·	7.2 km	MPC · JPL
136309	2004 BO_{44}	—	January 22, 2004	Socorro	LINEAR	·	3.4 km	MPC · JPL
136310	2004 BB_{47}	—	January 21, 2004	Socorro	LINEAR	·	4.1 km	MPC · JPL
136311	2004 BP_{47}	—	January 21, 2004	Socorro	LINEAR	·	2.3 km	MPC · JPL
136312	2004 BQ_{49}	—	January 21, 2004	Socorro	LINEAR	·	3.1 km	MPC · JPL
136313	2004 BO_{51}	—	January 21, 2004	Socorro	LINEAR	·	6.2 km	MPC · JPL
136314	2004 BS_{51}	—	January 21, 2004	Socorro	LINEAR	MIS	4.0 km	MPC · JPL
136315	2004 BF_{56}	—	January 23, 2004	Anderson Mesa	LONEOS	·	2.3 km	MPC · JPL
136316	2004 BU_{56}	—	January 23, 2004	Anderson Mesa	LONEOS	·	3.7 km	MPC · JPL
136317	2004 BO_{57}	—	January 23, 2004	Socorro	LINEAR	·	1.4 km	MPC · JPL
136318	2004 BK_{60}	—	January 21, 2004	Socorro	LINEAR	·	2.7 km	MPC · JPL
136319	2004 BA_{61}	—	January 21, 2004	Socorro	LINEAR	(29841)	2.1 km	MPC · JPL
136320	2004 BX_{61}	—	January 22, 2004	Socorro	LINEAR	·	2.7 km	MPC · JPL
136321	2004 BM_{74}	—	January 24, 2004	Socorro	LINEAR	·	3.0 km	MPC · JPL
136322	2004 BP_{80}	—	January 24, 2004	Socorro	LINEAR	·	2.9 km	MPC · JPL
136323	2004 BE_{81}	—	January 26, 2004	Anderson Mesa	LONEOS	·	2.7 km	MPC · JPL
136324	2004 BY_{86}	—	January 22, 2004	Socorro	LINEAR	·	2.2 km	MPC · JPL
136325	2004 BC_{88}	—	January 23, 2004	Socorro	LINEAR	EUN	1.7 km	MPC · JPL
136326	2004 BS_{89}	—	January 23, 2004	Socorro	LINEAR	·	2.6 km	MPC · JPL
136327	2004 BG_{94}	—	January 22, 2004	Palomar	NEAT	EOS	5.4 km	MPC · JPL
136328	2004 BX_{101}	—	January 29, 2004	Socorro	LINEAR	·	3.8 km	MPC · JPL
136329	2004 BC_{105}	—	January 24, 2004	Socorro	LINEAR	·	5.8 km	MPC · JPL
136330	2004 BM_{107}	—	January 28, 2004	Catalina	CSS	·	1.7 km	MPC · JPL
136331	2004 BG_{108}	—	January 28, 2004	Catalina	CSS	·	5.4 km	MPC · JPL
136332	2004 BS_{111}	—	January 29, 2004	Catalina	CSS	HNS	2.5 km	MPC · JPL
136333	2004 BA_{149}	—	January 16, 2004	Kitt Peak	Spacewatch	·	4.5 km	MPC · JPL
136334	2004 BX_{149}	—	January 17, 2004	Palomar	NEAT	ADE	4.9 km	MPC · JPL
136335	2004 CZ_{4}	—	February 10, 2004	Palomar	NEAT	THM	4.8 km	MPC · JPL
136336	2004 CK_{12}	—	February 11, 2004	Catalina	CSS	·	2.5 km	MPC · JPL
136337	2004 CY_{12}	—	February 11, 2004	Palomar	NEAT	·	3.5 km	MPC · JPL
136338	2004 CT_{14}	—	February 11, 2004	Palomar	NEAT	·	3.9 km	MPC · JPL
136339	2004 CW_{14}	—	February 11, 2004	Palomar	NEAT	·	3.7 km	MPC · JPL
136340	2004 CV_{18}	—	February 10, 2004	Palomar	NEAT	·	3.3 km	MPC · JPL
136341	2004 CO_{23}	—	February 12, 2004	Kitt Peak	Spacewatch	fast	3.2 km	MPC · JPL
136342	2004 CR_{26}	—	February 11, 2004	Catalina	CSS	·	6.0 km	MPC · JPL
136343	2004 CO_{31}	—	February 12, 2004	Kitt Peak	Spacewatch	KOR	2.3 km	MPC · JPL
136344	2004 CE_{33}	—	February 12, 2004	Kitt Peak	Spacewatch	·	2.1 km	MPC · JPL
136345	2004 CO_{35}	—	February 11, 2004	Catalina	CSS	EUN	2.8 km	MPC · JPL
136346	2004 CT_{44}	—	February 13, 2004	Kitt Peak	Spacewatch	PAD	3.5 km	MPC · JPL
136347	2004 CO_{52}	—	February 11, 2004	Catalina	CSS	EOS	3.5 km	MPC · JPL
136348	2004 CQ_{70}	—	February 12, 2004	Kitt Peak	Spacewatch	·	2.4 km	MPC · JPL
136349	2004 CA_{71}	—	February 12, 2004	Kitt Peak	Spacewatch	·	3.8 km	MPC · JPL
136350	2004 CS_{71}	—	February 13, 2004	Palomar	NEAT	VER	4.4 km	MPC · JPL
136351	2004 CZ_{71}	—	February 13, 2004	Palomar	NEAT	·	2.2 km	MPC · JPL
136352	2004 CA_{77}	—	February 11, 2004	Catalina	CSS	THM	4.8 km	MPC · JPL
136353	2004 CC_{78}	—	February 11, 2004	Anderson Mesa	LONEOS	NYS	2.6 km	MPC · JPL
136354	2004 CK_{78}	—	February 11, 2004	Palomar	NEAT	·	4.0 km	MPC · JPL
136355	2004 CF_{81}	—	February 12, 2004	Kitt Peak	Spacewatch	HOF	4.8 km	MPC · JPL
136356	2004 CG_{98}	—	February 14, 2004	Catalina	CSS	ERI	2.6 km	MPC · JPL
136357	2004 CX_{121}	—	February 12, 2004	Kitt Peak	Spacewatch	·	2.3 km	MPC · JPL
136358	2004 DB_{3}	—	February 16, 2004	Kitt Peak	Spacewatch	·	3.0 km	MPC · JPL
136359	2004 DS_{4}	—	February 16, 2004	Kitt Peak	Spacewatch	·	3.1 km	MPC · JPL
136360	2004 DO_{19}	—	February 17, 2004	Socorro	LINEAR	·	2.4 km	MPC · JPL
136361	2004 DP_{23}	—	February 18, 2004	Catalina	CSS	TIR	3.1 km	MPC · JPL
136362	2004 DF_{27}	—	February 16, 2004	Kitt Peak	Spacewatch	HOF	4.2 km	MPC · JPL
136363	2004 DS_{30}	—	February 17, 2004	Socorro	LINEAR	·	3.4 km	MPC · JPL
136364	2004 DV_{72}	—	February 17, 2004	Palomar	NEAT	NAE	4.4 km	MPC · JPL
136365	2004 EZ_{2}	—	March 9, 2004	Palomar	NEAT	·	5.4 km	MPC · JPL
136366	2004 EK_{5}	—	March 11, 2004	Palomar	NEAT	·	4.6 km	MPC · JPL
136367 Gierlinger	2004 EU_{11}	Gierlinger	March 10, 2004	Altschwendt	W. Ries	CYB	7.9 km	MPC · JPL
136368	2004 EC_{15}	—	March 11, 2004	Palomar	NEAT	BRA	3.5 km	MPC · JPL
136369	2004 EG_{22}	—	March 15, 2004	Goodricke-Pigott	Goodricke-Pigott	·	1.6 km	MPC · JPL
136370	2004 ED_{26}	—	March 14, 2004	Socorro	LINEAR	V	1.1 km	MPC · JPL
136371	2004 ER_{30}	—	March 15, 2004	Catalina	CSS	·	7.0 km	MPC · JPL
136372	2004 EY_{34}	—	March 12, 2004	Palomar	NEAT	HYG	3.8 km	MPC · JPL
136373	2004 EN_{55}	—	March 14, 2004	Palomar	NEAT	·	8.8 km	MPC · JPL
136374	2004 EA_{59}	—	March 15, 2004	Palomar	NEAT	·	5.3 km	MPC · JPL
136375	2004 EV_{64}	—	March 14, 2004	Socorro	LINEAR	·	3.9 km	MPC · JPL
136376	2004 EF_{83}	—	March 14, 2004	Socorro	LINEAR	EUN	3.2 km	MPC · JPL
136377	2004 FV_{22}	—	March 17, 2004	Kitt Peak	Spacewatch	HOF	4.2 km	MPC · JPL
136378	2004 FF_{24}	—	March 17, 2004	Kitt Peak	Spacewatch	NYS	2.1 km	MPC · JPL
136379	2004 FY_{33}	—	March 16, 2004	Socorro	LINEAR	·	5.8 km	MPC · JPL
136380	2004 FR_{36}	—	March 16, 2004	Kitt Peak	Spacewatch	·	6.0 km	MPC · JPL
136381	2004 FU_{44}	—	March 16, 2004	Socorro	LINEAR	·	3.2 km	MPC · JPL
136382	2004 FQ_{49}	—	March 18, 2004	Socorro	LINEAR	GEF	2.1 km	MPC · JPL
136383	2004 FT_{65}	—	March 19, 2004	Socorro	LINEAR	·	3.7 km	MPC · JPL
136384	2004 FS_{104}	—	March 23, 2004	Socorro	LINEAR	·	5.3 km	MPC · JPL
136385	2004 FR_{148}	—	March 31, 2004	Socorro	LINEAR	·	7.3 km	MPC · JPL
136386	2004 FD_{152}	—	March 17, 2004	Kitt Peak	Spacewatch	·	1.3 km	MPC · JPL
136387	2004 GJ_{34}	—	April 13, 2004	Palomar	NEAT	TIR	5.0 km	MPC · JPL
136388	2004 GA_{37}	—	April 14, 2004	Anderson Mesa	LONEOS	·	3.3 km	MPC · JPL
136389	2004 HJ_{40}	—	April 19, 2004	Kitt Peak	Spacewatch	·	5.1 km	MPC · JPL
136390	2004 HA_{41}	—	April 19, 2004	Socorro	LINEAR	·	5.7 km	MPC · JPL
136391	2004 JA_{25}	—	May 15, 2004	Socorro	LINEAR	·	2.2 km	MPC · JPL
136392	2004 PL_{93}	—	August 11, 2004	Socorro	LINEAR	·	2.5 km	MPC · JPL
136393	2004 SE_{30}	—	September 17, 2004	Socorro	LINEAR	NYS	1.8 km	MPC · JPL
136394	2004 TB_{106}	—	October 7, 2004	Socorro	LINEAR	·	2.3 km	MPC · JPL
136395	2004 TO_{212}	—	October 8, 2004	Kitt Peak	Spacewatch	NYS	1.7 km	MPC · JPL
136396	2004 XZ_{113}	—	December 10, 2004	Kitt Peak	Spacewatch	·	2.1 km	MPC · JPL
136397	2004 XB_{134}	—	December 15, 2004	Socorro	LINEAR	·	4.8 km	MPC · JPL
136398	2004 XC_{158}	—	December 14, 2004	Kitt Peak	Spacewatch	·	3.3 km	MPC · JPL
136399	2004 XZ_{176}	—	December 11, 2004	Catalina	CSS	H	990 m	MPC · JPL
136400	2004 XW_{180}	—	December 14, 2004	Catalina	CSS	·	7.1 km	MPC · JPL

== 136401–136500 ==
back to top

Designation			Discovery			Properties		Ref
Permanent	Provisional	Named after	Date	Site	Discoverer(s)	Category	Diam.	Ref
136401	2004 YV_{19}	—	December 18, 2004	Mount Lemmon	Mount Lemmon Survey	·	4.5 km	MPC · JPL
136402	2004 YD_{20}	—	December 18, 2004	Mount Lemmon	Mount Lemmon Survey	NYS	1.3 km	MPC · JPL
136403	2004 YS_{20}	—	December 18, 2004	Mount Lemmon	Mount Lemmon Survey	·	2.0 km	MPC · JPL
136404	2005 AU_{11}	—	January 6, 2005	Catalina	CSS	PHO	1.8 km	MPC · JPL
136405	2005 AV_{16}	—	January 6, 2005	Socorro	LINEAR	·	3.4 km	MPC · JPL
136406	2005 AR_{32}	—	January 11, 2005	Socorro	LINEAR	·	2.6 km	MPC · JPL
136407	2005 AR_{39}	—	January 13, 2005	Kitt Peak	Spacewatch	NYS	1.8 km	MPC · JPL
136408	2005 AT_{53}	—	January 13, 2005	Kitt Peak	Spacewatch	·	1.9 km	MPC · JPL
136409	2005 AE_{54}	—	January 13, 2005	Kitt Peak	Spacewatch	·	2.2 km	MPC · JPL
136410	2005 AX_{56}	—	January 15, 2005	Catalina	CSS	·	3.7 km	MPC · JPL
136411	2005 AL_{79}	—	January 15, 2005	Kitt Peak	Spacewatch	·	1.4 km	MPC · JPL
136412	2005 BG_{25}	—	January 18, 2005	Kitt Peak	Spacewatch	fast	2.2 km	MPC · JPL
136413	2005 CH_{11}	—	February 1, 2005	Kitt Peak	Spacewatch	·	1.4 km	MPC · JPL
136414	2005 CW_{35}	—	February 3, 2005	Socorro	LINEAR	·	2.9 km	MPC · JPL
136415	2005 CE_{43}	—	February 2, 2005	Socorro	LINEAR	·	2.2 km	MPC · JPL
136416	2005 CY_{43}	—	February 2, 2005	Kitt Peak	Spacewatch	·	2.4 km	MPC · JPL
136417	2005 CO_{45}	—	February 2, 2005	Kitt Peak	Spacewatch	·	2.0 km	MPC · JPL
136418	2005 CJ_{46}	—	February 2, 2005	Kitt Peak	Spacewatch	·	1.6 km	MPC · JPL
136419	2005 CA_{48}	—	February 2, 2005	Kitt Peak	Spacewatch	·	1.5 km	MPC · JPL
136420	2005 CL_{48}	—	February 2, 2005	Catalina	CSS	·	1.2 km	MPC · JPL
136421	2005 CK_{49}	—	February 2, 2005	Catalina	CSS	NYS	2.0 km	MPC · JPL
136422	2005 CS_{49}	—	February 2, 2005	Catalina	CSS	·	1.1 km	MPC · JPL
136423	2005 CH_{50}	—	February 2, 2005	Socorro	LINEAR	·	1.2 km	MPC · JPL
136424	2005 CW_{51}	—	February 2, 2005	Catalina	CSS	·	2.8 km	MPC · JPL
136425	2005 CQ_{58}	—	February 2, 2005	Kitt Peak	Spacewatch	·	1.8 km	MPC · JPL
136426	2005 CJ_{69}	—	February 4, 2005	Anderson Mesa	LONEOS	V	1.1 km	MPC · JPL
136427	2005 ET_{3}	—	March 1, 2005	Kitt Peak	Spacewatch	MAS	1.0 km	MPC · JPL
136428	2005 EK_{12}	—	March 2, 2005	Catalina	CSS	·	1.8 km	MPC · JPL
136429	2005 EU_{13}	—	March 3, 2005	Kitt Peak	Spacewatch	PHO	2.2 km	MPC · JPL
136430	2005 EV_{13}	—	March 3, 2005	Kitt Peak	Spacewatch	·	1.1 km	MPC · JPL
136431	2005 ER_{16}	—	March 3, 2005	Kitt Peak	Spacewatch	·	1.5 km	MPC · JPL
136432 Allenlunsford	2005 EW_{20}	Allenlunsford	March 3, 2005	Catalina	CSS	·	2.3 km	MPC · JPL
136433	2005 ER_{28}	—	March 3, 2005	Catalina	CSS	·	1.8 km	MPC · JPL
136434	2005 EA_{32}	—	March 3, 2005	Catalina	CSS	·	3.4 km	MPC · JPL
136435	2005 EH_{32}	—	March 3, 2005	Catalina	CSS	·	2.3 km	MPC · JPL
136436	2005 EA_{41}	—	March 1, 2005	Catalina	CSS	·	2.3 km	MPC · JPL
136437	2005 EZ_{42}	—	March 3, 2005	Kitt Peak	Spacewatch	·	1.9 km	MPC · JPL
136438	2005 EU_{45}	—	March 3, 2005	Catalina	CSS	·	5.6 km	MPC · JPL
136439	2005 EV_{53}	—	March 4, 2005	Kitt Peak	Spacewatch	·	1.4 km	MPC · JPL
136440	2005 EK_{56}	—	March 4, 2005	Kitt Peak	Spacewatch	NYS	2.1 km	MPC · JPL
136441	2005 EP_{58}	—	March 4, 2005	Kitt Peak	Spacewatch	MAS	1.1 km	MPC · JPL
136442	2005 EE_{62}	—	March 4, 2005	Mount Lemmon	Mount Lemmon Survey	·	1.1 km	MPC · JPL
136443	2005 EN_{67}	—	March 4, 2005	Socorro	LINEAR	·	4.6 km	MPC · JPL
136444	2005 EX_{84}	—	March 4, 2005	Catalina	CSS	·	6.0 km	MPC · JPL
136445	2005 EP_{108}	—	March 4, 2005	Catalina	CSS	·	2.3 km	MPC · JPL
136446	2005 EO_{115}	—	March 4, 2005	Socorro	LINEAR	·	3.6 km	MPC · JPL
136447	2005 EN_{124}	—	March 8, 2005	Anderson Mesa	LONEOS	·	1.1 km	MPC · JPL
136448	2005 ES_{125}	—	March 8, 2005	Catalina	CSS	LIX	6.6 km	MPC · JPL
136449	2005 EA_{140}	—	March 9, 2005	Socorro	LINEAR	·	4.9 km	MPC · JPL
136450	2005 EX_{141}	—	March 10, 2005	Catalina	CSS	·	2.3 km	MPC · JPL
136451	2005 EU_{154}	—	March 8, 2005	Mount Lemmon	Mount Lemmon Survey	·	1.8 km	MPC · JPL
136452	2005 EQ_{166}	—	March 11, 2005	Mount Lemmon	Mount Lemmon Survey	·	1.7 km	MPC · JPL
136453	2005 EO_{173}	—	March 8, 2005	Anderson Mesa	LONEOS	·	1.6 km	MPC · JPL
136454	2005 EF_{182}	—	March 9, 2005	Catalina	CSS	·	8.0 km	MPC · JPL
136455	2005 ET_{184}	—	March 9, 2005	Mount Lemmon	Mount Lemmon Survey	(7605)	8.3 km	MPC · JPL
136456	2005 EO_{188}	—	March 10, 2005	Mount Lemmon	Mount Lemmon Survey	·	2.2 km	MPC · JPL
136457	2005 EK_{202}	—	March 8, 2005	Catalina	CSS	·	5.1 km	MPC · JPL
136458	2005 EM_{206}	—	March 13, 2005	Catalina	CSS	·	2.0 km	MPC · JPL
136459	2005 EA_{219}	—	March 10, 2005	Catalina	CSS	·	4.2 km	MPC · JPL
136460	2005 EJ_{224}	—	March 10, 2005	Anderson Mesa	LONEOS	ADE	4.6 km	MPC · JPL
136461	2005 EO_{224}	—	March 11, 2005	Kitt Peak	Spacewatch	NYS	1.6 km	MPC · JPL
136462	2005 EO_{227}	—	March 9, 2005	Socorro	LINEAR	·	2.0 km	MPC · JPL
136463	2005 EK_{252}	—	March 10, 2005	Mount Lemmon	Mount Lemmon Survey	MAS	1.5 km	MPC · JPL
136464	2005 EV_{253}	—	March 11, 2005	Socorro	LINEAR	·	2.3 km	MPC · JPL
136465	2005 EA_{266}	—	March 13, 2005	Catalina	CSS	·	2.0 km	MPC · JPL
136466	2005 EO_{271}	—	March 13, 2005	Catalina	CSS	·	2.3 km	MPC · JPL
136467	2005 EO_{276}	—	March 8, 2005	Socorro	LINEAR	EUN	2.4 km	MPC · JPL
136468	2005 EF_{283}	—	March 11, 2005	Kitt Peak	Spacewatch	·	2.7 km	MPC · JPL
136469	2005 FM_{2}	—	March 17, 2005	Goodricke-Pigott	R. A. Tucker	AGN	2.8 km	MPC · JPL
136470	2005 FY_{6}	—	March 30, 2005	Catalina	CSS	EUN	2.4 km	MPC · JPL
136471	2005 FJ_{7}	—	March 30, 2005	Catalina	CSS	·	2.4 km	MPC · JPL
136472 Makemake	2005 FY_{9}	Makemake	March 31, 2005	Palomar	M. E. Brown, C. A. Trujillo, D. L. Rabinowitz	cubewano (hot) · moon	1430 km	MPC · JPL
136473 Bakosgáspár	2005 GB	Bakosgáspár	April 1, 2005	Piszkéstető	K. Sárneczky	·	1.7 km	MPC · JPL
136474	2005 GX_{27}	—	April 3, 2005	Palomar	NEAT	·	4.5 km	MPC · JPL
136475	2005 GE_{44}	—	April 5, 2005	Anderson Mesa	LONEOS	·	1.7 km	MPC · JPL
136476	2005 GT_{55}	—	April 6, 2005	Anderson Mesa	LONEOS	·	3.5 km	MPC · JPL
136477	2005 GB_{59}	—	April 4, 2005	Catalina	CSS	·	6.6 km	MPC · JPL
136478	2005 GD_{63}	—	April 2, 2005	Mount Lemmon	Mount Lemmon Survey	NYS ·	3.2 km	MPC · JPL
136479	2005 GH_{68}	—	April 2, 2005	Mount Lemmon	Mount Lemmon Survey	·	1.6 km	MPC · JPL
136480	2005 GL_{69}	—	April 3, 2005	Palomar	NEAT	·	4.5 km	MPC · JPL
136481	2005 GV_{75}	—	April 5, 2005	Mount Lemmon	Mount Lemmon Survey	·	1.4 km	MPC · JPL
136482	2005 GV_{77}	—	April 6, 2005	Catalina	CSS	·	6.3 km	MPC · JPL
136483	2005 GB_{79}	—	April 6, 2005	Catalina	CSS	·	4.0 km	MPC · JPL
136484	2005 GQ_{81}	—	April 6, 2005	Catalina	CSS	·	4.8 km	MPC · JPL
136485	2005 GU_{82}	—	April 4, 2005	Mount Lemmon	Mount Lemmon Survey	MAS	1.2 km	MPC · JPL
136486	2005 GY_{95}	—	April 6, 2005	Anderson Mesa	LONEOS	EUP	7.1 km	MPC · JPL
136487	2005 GZ_{100}	—	April 9, 2005	Mount Lemmon	Mount Lemmon Survey	·	2.5 km	MPC · JPL
136488	2005 GS_{119}	—	April 7, 2005	Catalina	CSS	·	5.9 km	MPC · JPL
136489	2005 GG_{133}	—	April 10, 2005	Kitt Peak	Spacewatch	LEO	2.9 km	MPC · JPL
136490	2005 GD_{134}	—	April 10, 2005	Kitt Peak	Spacewatch	·	1.4 km	MPC · JPL
136491	2005 GL_{140}	—	April 13, 2005	Socorro	LINEAR	·	5.0 km	MPC · JPL
136492	2005 GS_{140}	—	April 11, 2005	Goodricke-Pigott	Goodricke-Pigott	EUN	2.0 km	MPC · JPL
136493	2005 GW_{141}	—	April 9, 2005	Socorro	LINEAR	·	6.6 km	MPC · JPL
136494	2005 GE_{150}	—	April 11, 2005	Kitt Peak	Spacewatch	·	4.9 km	MPC · JPL
136495	2005 GA_{161}	—	April 13, 2005	Socorro	LINEAR	·	3.0 km	MPC · JPL
136496	2005 GZ_{180}	—	April 12, 2005	Kitt Peak	Spacewatch	(12739)	3.1 km	MPC · JPL
136497	2005 HG_{3}	—	April 16, 2005	Kitt Peak	Spacewatch	·	3.7 km	MPC · JPL
136498	2005 JO_{20}	—	May 4, 2005	Catalina	CSS	·	9.0 km	MPC · JPL
136499	2005 JX_{20}	—	May 4, 2005	Catalina	CSS	·	4.0 km	MPC · JPL
136500	2005 JY_{44}	—	May 9, 2005	Catalina	CSS	·	6.4 km	MPC · JPL

== 136501–136600 ==
back to top

Designation			Discovery			Properties		Ref
Permanent	Provisional	Named after	Date	Site	Discoverer(s)	Category	Diam.	Ref
136501	2005 JO_{68}	—	May 6, 2005	Catalina	CSS	EOS	3.4 km	MPC · JPL
136502	2005 JG_{132}	—	May 13, 2005	Siding Spring	SSS	·	6.4 km	MPC · JPL
136503	2005 JO_{146}	—	May 13, 2005	Catalina	CSS	·	3.3 km	MPC · JPL
136504	2005 JX_{153}	—	May 4, 2005	Kitt Peak	Spacewatch	·	3.0 km	MPC · JPL
136505	2005 JX_{160}	—	May 8, 2005	Kitt Peak	Spacewatch	·	1.9 km	MPC · JPL
136506	2005 KF_{1}	—	May 16, 2005	Kitt Peak	Spacewatch	·	4.5 km	MPC · JPL
136507	2005 KV_{5}	—	May 16, 2005	Palomar	NEAT	·	2.7 km	MPC · JPL
136508	2005 KO_{8}	—	May 18, 2005	Siding Spring	SSS	EOS	3.1 km	MPC · JPL
136509	2005 KC_{12}	—	May 31, 2005	Catalina	CSS	EOS	3.3 km	MPC · JPL
136510	2005 LH	—	June 1, 2005	RAS	Lowe, A.	EOS	4.3 km	MPC · JPL
136511	2005 MQ_{45}	—	June 27, 2005	Kitt Peak	Spacewatch	V	1.1 km	MPC · JPL
136512	2005 NA_{50}	—	July 5, 2005	Palomar	NEAT	·	5.4 km	MPC · JPL
136513	2005 NL_{93}	—	July 5, 2005	Siding Spring	SSS	·	5.0 km	MPC · JPL
136514	2005 QT_{36}	—	August 25, 2005	Palomar	NEAT	HYG	5.5 km	MPC · JPL
136515	2005 QF_{37}	—	August 25, 2005	Palomar	NEAT	·	2.4 km	MPC · JPL
136516	2005 QR_{49}	—	August 26, 2005	Palomar	NEAT	·	3.2 km	MPC · JPL
136517	2005 SY_{20}	—	September 25, 2005	Kitt Peak	Spacewatch	·	2.3 km	MPC · JPL
136518 Opitz	2005 SF_{70}	Opitz	September 28, 2005	Piszkéstető	K. Sárneczky	·	2.4 km	MPC · JPL
136519	2005 SZ_{242}	—	September 30, 2005	Mount Lemmon	Mount Lemmon Survey	·	3.3 km	MPC · JPL
136520	2005 UR_{314}	—	October 28, 2005	Catalina	CSS	·	1.6 km	MPC · JPL
136521	2006 DE_{3}	—	February 20, 2006	Kitt Peak	Spacewatch	PHO	1.3 km	MPC · JPL
136522	2006 DA_{59}	—	February 24, 2006	Catalina	CSS	·	3.6 km	MPC · JPL
136523	2006 DM_{195}	—	February 28, 2006	Socorro	LINEAR	·	5.1 km	MPC · JPL
136524	2006 EY_{16}	—	March 2, 2006	Mount Lemmon	Mount Lemmon Survey	MAS	1.7 km	MPC · JPL
136525	2006 FQ_{44}	—	March 23, 2006	Kitt Peak	Spacewatch	·	2.0 km	MPC · JPL
136526	2006 FU_{45}	—	March 24, 2006	Anderson Mesa	LONEOS	·	7.6 km	MPC · JPL
136527	2006 GK_{22}	—	April 2, 2006	Kitt Peak	Spacewatch	·	2.4 km	MPC · JPL
136528	2006 GM_{22}	—	April 2, 2006	Kitt Peak	Spacewatch	AGN	2.3 km	MPC · JPL
136529	2006 GH_{36}	—	April 7, 2006	Socorro	LINEAR	·	2.6 km	MPC · JPL
136530	2006 GS_{37}	—	April 9, 2006	Siding Spring	SSS	·	1.5 km	MPC · JPL
136531	2006 HA_{4}	—	April 18, 2006	Palomar	NEAT	·	1.3 km	MPC · JPL
136532	2006 HL_{11}	—	April 19, 2006	Kitt Peak	Spacewatch	·	3.1 km	MPC · JPL
136533	2006 HX_{25}	—	April 20, 2006	Kitt Peak	Spacewatch	THM	4.8 km	MPC · JPL
136534	2006 KK_{16}	—	May 20, 2006	Anderson Mesa	LONEOS	·	7.0 km	MPC · JPL
136535	2006 KA_{85}	—	May 25, 2006	Kitt Peak	Spacewatch	·	3.9 km	MPC · JPL
136536	2006 LJ_{5}	—	June 11, 2006	Palomar	NEAT	EUN	2.3 km	MPC · JPL
136537	2006 LX_{6}	—	June 11, 2006	Palomar	NEAT	·	1.7 km	MPC · JPL
136538	2006 MN_{3}	—	June 19, 2006	Mount Lemmon	Mount Lemmon Survey	ADE	4.3 km	MPC · JPL
136539	2144 P-L	—	September 24, 1960	Palomar	C. J. van Houten, I. van Houten-Groeneveld, T. Gehrels	·	2.8 km	MPC · JPL
136540	2543 P-L	—	September 24, 1960	Palomar	C. J. van Houten, I. van Houten-Groeneveld, T. Gehrels	·	4.4 km	MPC · JPL
136541	3012 P-L	—	September 24, 1960	Palomar	C. J. van Houten, I. van Houten-Groeneveld, T. Gehrels	EOS	4.3 km	MPC · JPL
136542	3089 P-L	—	September 25, 1960	Palomar	C. J. van Houten, I. van Houten-Groeneveld, T. Gehrels	EUN	2.4 km	MPC · JPL
136543	3111 P-L	—	September 24, 1960	Palomar	C. J. van Houten, I. van Houten-Groeneveld, T. Gehrels	EOS	4.1 km	MPC · JPL
136544	4773 P-L	—	September 24, 1960	Palomar	C. J. van Houten, I. van Houten-Groeneveld, T. Gehrels	·	3.1 km	MPC · JPL
136545	5552 P-L	—	October 17, 1960	Palomar	C. J. van Houten, I. van Houten-Groeneveld, T. Gehrels	RAF	1.6 km	MPC · JPL
136546	6208 P-L	—	September 24, 1960	Palomar	C. J. van Houten, I. van Houten-Groeneveld, T. Gehrels	PHO	1.9 km	MPC · JPL
136547	6297 P-L	—	September 24, 1960	Palomar	C. J. van Houten, I. van Houten-Groeneveld, T. Gehrels	·	2.9 km	MPC · JPL
136548	6329 P-L	—	September 24, 1960	Palomar	C. J. van Houten, I. van Houten-Groeneveld, T. Gehrels	(1298)	4.5 km	MPC · JPL
136549	6702 P-L	—	September 24, 1960	Palomar	C. J. van Houten, I. van Houten-Groeneveld, T. Gehrels	·	1.7 km	MPC · JPL
136550	6747 P-L	—	September 24, 1960	Palomar	C. J. van Houten, I. van Houten-Groeneveld, T. Gehrels	(194)	2.2 km	MPC · JPL
136551	6864 P-L	—	September 24, 1960	Palomar	C. J. van Houten, I. van Houten-Groeneveld, T. Gehrels	·	1.6 km	MPC · JPL
136552	1047 T-2	—	September 29, 1973	Palomar	C. J. van Houten, I. van Houten-Groeneveld, T. Gehrels	LIX	6.7 km	MPC · JPL
136553	1445 T-2	—	September 29, 1973	Palomar	C. J. van Houten, I. van Houten-Groeneveld, T. Gehrels	·	6.7 km	MPC · JPL
136554	2062 T-2	—	September 29, 1973	Palomar	C. J. van Houten, I. van Houten-Groeneveld, T. Gehrels	(5)	2.0 km	MPC · JPL
136555	2254 T-2	—	September 29, 1973	Palomar	C. J. van Houten, I. van Houten-Groeneveld, T. Gehrels	EUN · slow	3.2 km	MPC · JPL
136556	3299 T-2	—	September 30, 1973	Palomar	C. J. van Houten, I. van Houten-Groeneveld, T. Gehrels	·	1.3 km	MPC · JPL
136557 Neleus	5214 T-2	Neleus	September 25, 1973	Palomar	C. J. van Houten, I. van Houten-Groeneveld, T. Gehrels	L4	20 km	MPC · JPL
136558	5429 T-2	—	September 30, 1973	Palomar	C. J. van Houten, I. van Houten-Groeneveld, T. Gehrels	·	7.1 km	MPC · JPL
136559	1035 T-3	—	October 17, 1977	Palomar	C. J. van Houten, I. van Houten-Groeneveld, T. Gehrels	·	1.3 km	MPC · JPL
136560	1109 T-3	—	October 17, 1977	Palomar	C. J. van Houten, I. van Houten-Groeneveld, T. Gehrels	·	2.3 km	MPC · JPL
136561	1304 T-3	—	October 17, 1977	Palomar	C. J. van Houten, I. van Houten-Groeneveld, T. Gehrels	·	9.0 km	MPC · JPL
136562	2609 T-3	—	October 16, 1977	Palomar	C. J. van Houten, I. van Houten-Groeneveld, T. Gehrels	·	4.9 km	MPC · JPL
136563	3288 T-3	—	October 16, 1977	Palomar	C. J. van Houten, I. van Houten-Groeneveld, T. Gehrels	·	1.7 km	MPC · JPL
136564	1977 VA	—	November 7, 1977	Palomar	E. F. Helin, E. M. Shoemaker	AMO	400 m	MPC · JPL
136565	1977 XF_{3}	—	December 7, 1977	Palomar	S. J. Bus	·	6.4 km	MPC · JPL
136566	1978 VE_{4}	—	November 7, 1978	Palomar	E. F. Helin, S. J. Bus	fast	2.2 km	MPC · JPL
136567	1979 OA_{11}	—	July 24, 1979	Siding Spring	S. J. Bus	·	4.4 km	MPC · JPL
136568	1980 XB	—	December 13, 1980	Mount Hamilton	E. A. Harlan	·	2.8 km	MPC · JPL
136569	1981 EN_{2}	—	March 2, 1981	Siding Spring	S. J. Bus	·	6.1 km	MPC · JPL
136570	1981 EB_{3}	—	March 2, 1981	Siding Spring	S. J. Bus	·	4.5 km	MPC · JPL
136571	1981 EL_{8}	—	March 1, 1981	Siding Spring	S. J. Bus	TIR	5.1 km	MPC · JPL
136572	1981 EA_{14}	—	March 1, 1981	Siding Spring	S. J. Bus	·	3.0 km	MPC · JPL
136573	1981 EJ_{14}	—	March 1, 1981	Siding Spring	S. J. Bus	·	3.0 km	MPC · JPL
136574	1981 EW_{16}	—	March 6, 1981	Siding Spring	S. J. Bus	·	4.2 km	MPC · JPL
136575	1981 EN_{28}	—	March 6, 1981	Siding Spring	S. J. Bus	·	2.1 km	MPC · JPL
136576	1981 EN_{33}	—	March 1, 1981	Siding Spring	S. J. Bus	·	1.1 km	MPC · JPL
136577	1981 EN_{38}	—	March 1, 1981	Siding Spring	S. J. Bus	·	5.3 km	MPC · JPL
136578	1981 EL_{45}	—	March 1, 1981	Siding Spring	S. J. Bus	·	2.7 km	MPC · JPL
136579	1981 EC_{48}	—	March 6, 1981	Siding Spring	S. J. Bus	·	2.6 km	MPC · JPL
136580	1984 WL	—	November 27, 1984	Caussols	Ciffreo, J.	·	2.3 km	MPC · JPL
136581	1986 GX	—	April 4, 1986	Kitt Peak	Spacewatch	·	3.2 km	MPC · JPL
136582	1992 BA	—	January 27, 1992	Kitt Peak	Spacewatch	AMO	380 m	MPC · JPL
136583	1992 DL_{9}	—	February 29, 1992	La Silla	UESAC	EMA	5.8 km	MPC · JPL
136584	1992 EE_{28}	—	March 8, 1992	La Silla	UESAC	·	1.8 km	MPC · JPL
136585	1992 SG_{19}	—	September 22, 1992	La Silla	E. W. Elst	·	5.0 km	MPC · JPL
136586	1992 UC_{7}	—	October 18, 1992	Kitt Peak	Spacewatch	·	1.1 km	MPC · JPL
136587	1993 FM_{4}	—	March 17, 1993	La Silla	UESAC	·	1.6 km	MPC · JPL
136588	1993 FF_{7}	—	March 17, 1993	La Silla	UESAC	·	2.2 km	MPC · JPL
136589	1993 FD_{8}	—	March 17, 1993	La Silla	UESAC	NYS	1.6 km	MPC · JPL
136590	1993 FE_{14}	—	March 17, 1993	La Silla	UESAC	·	3.4 km	MPC · JPL
136591	1993 FN_{18}	—	March 17, 1993	La Silla	UESAC	·	3.9 km	MPC · JPL
136592	1993 FE_{19}	—	March 17, 1993	La Silla	UESAC	·	3.9 km	MPC · JPL
136593	1993 FX_{19}	—	March 17, 1993	La Silla	UESAC	·	7.0 km	MPC · JPL
136594	1993 FK_{28}	—	March 21, 1993	La Silla	UESAC	·	2.3 km	MPC · JPL
136595	1993 FH_{29}	—	March 21, 1993	La Silla	UESAC	·	5.3 km	MPC · JPL
136596	1993 FG_{30}	—	March 21, 1993	La Silla	UESAC	·	5.4 km	MPC · JPL
136597	1993 FA_{31}	—	March 19, 1993	La Silla	UESAC	·	3.5 km	MPC · JPL
136598	1993 FJ_{31}	—	March 19, 1993	La Silla	UESAC	·	1.8 km	MPC · JPL
136599	1993 FR_{37}	—	March 19, 1993	La Silla	UESAC	NYS	2.3 km	MPC · JPL
136600	1993 FL_{38}	—	March 19, 1993	La Silla	UESAC	·	1.4 km	MPC · JPL

== 136601–136700 ==
back to top

Designation			Discovery			Properties		Ref
Permanent	Provisional	Named after	Date	Site	Discoverer(s)	Category	Diam.	Ref
136601	1993 FC_{49}	—	March 19, 1993	La Silla	UESAC	·	3.8 km	MPC · JPL
136602	1993 HT_{2}	—	April 19, 1993	Kitt Peak	Spacewatch	·	1.8 km	MPC · JPL
136603	1993 PR_{4}	—	August 15, 1993	Caussols	E. W. Elst	·	2.3 km	MPC · JPL
136604	1993 QD_{1}	—	August 19, 1993	Palomar	E. F. Helin	·	5.2 km	MPC · JPL
136605	1993 SC_{8}	—	September 17, 1993	La Silla	E. W. Elst	·	2.0 km	MPC · JPL
136606	1993 TD_{6}	—	October 9, 1993	Kitt Peak	Spacewatch	·	2.5 km	MPC · JPL
136607	1993 TW_{19}	—	October 9, 1993	La Silla	E. W. Elst	·	2.9 km	MPC · JPL
136608	1993 TF_{25}	—	October 9, 1993	La Silla	E. W. Elst	JUN	1.6 km	MPC · JPL
136609	1993 TY_{30}	—	October 9, 1993	La Silla	E. W. Elst	·	2.6 km	MPC · JPL
136610	1993 TK_{31}	—	October 9, 1993	La Silla	E. W. Elst	·	2.5 km	MPC · JPL
136611	1993 TB_{32}	—	October 9, 1993	La Silla	E. W. Elst	·	3.3 km	MPC · JPL
136612	1993 TW_{37}	—	October 9, 1993	La Silla	E. W. Elst	·	3.0 km	MPC · JPL
136613	1993 TA_{38}	—	October 9, 1993	La Silla	E. W. Elst	·	2.5 km	MPC · JPL
136614	1993 VA_{6}	—	November 9, 1993	Kitt Peak	Spacewatch	MRX	1.7 km	MPC · JPL
136615	1994 AP_{10}	—	January 8, 1994	Kitt Peak	Spacewatch	CYB	7.3 km	MPC · JPL
136616	1994 AJ_{12}	—	January 11, 1994	Kitt Peak	Spacewatch	(21344)	3.0 km	MPC · JPL
136617	1994 CC	—	February 3, 1994	Kitt Peak	Spacewatch	APO +1km · PHA · moon	900 m	MPC · JPL
136618	1994 CN_{2}	—	February 15, 1994	Kitt Peak	Spacewatch	APO +1km · PHA	1.5 km	MPC · JPL
136619	1994 CH_{18}	—	February 8, 1994	La Silla	E. W. Elst	·	1.5 km	MPC · JPL
136620	1994 JC	—	May 4, 1994	Palomar	E. F. Helin, K. J. Lawrence	T_{j} (2.73) · CYB · 2:1J (unstable)	5.7 km	MPC · JPL
136621	1994 JD_{7}	—	May 5, 1994	Kitt Peak	Spacewatch	·	3.3 km	MPC · JPL
136622	1994 PC_{6}	—	August 10, 1994	La Silla	E. W. Elst	HYG	4.2 km	MPC · JPL
136623	1994 PS_{6}	—	August 10, 1994	La Silla	E. W. Elst	·	4.7 km	MPC · JPL
136624	1994 PD_{14}	—	August 10, 1994	La Silla	E. W. Elst	HYG	5.9 km	MPC · JPL
136625	1994 PW_{15}	—	August 10, 1994	La Silla	E. W. Elst	·	2.1 km	MPC · JPL
136626	1994 PX_{18}	—	August 12, 1994	La Silla	E. W. Elst	EUN	1.9 km	MPC · JPL
136627	1994 PM_{19}	—	August 12, 1994	La Silla	E. W. Elst	·	4.7 km	MPC · JPL
136628	1994 PL_{21}	—	August 12, 1994	La Silla	E. W. Elst	·	6.0 km	MPC · JPL
136629	1994 PB_{29}	—	August 12, 1994	La Silla	E. W. Elst	NYS	1.8 km	MPC · JPL
136630	1994 RJ_{5}	—	September 11, 1994	Kitt Peak	Spacewatch	HYG	4.5 km	MPC · JPL
136631	1994 RR_{6}	—	September 12, 1994	Kitt Peak	Spacewatch	NYS	1.4 km	MPC · JPL
136632	1994 SG_{5}	—	September 28, 1994	Kitt Peak	Spacewatch	·	2.1 km	MPC · JPL
136633	1994 SH_{6}	—	September 28, 1994	Kitt Peak	Spacewatch	HYG	4.9 km	MPC · JPL
136634	1994 SE_{7}	—	September 28, 1994	Kitt Peak	Spacewatch	THM	6.5 km	MPC · JPL
136635	1994 VA_{1}	—	November 5, 1994	Kitt Peak	Spacewatch	AMO	530 m	MPC · JPL
136636	1994 VE_{4}	—	November 5, 1994	Kitt Peak	Spacewatch	·	2.2 km	MPC · JPL
136637	1994 WA_{5}	—	November 28, 1994	Kitt Peak	Spacewatch	THM	3.8 km	MPC · JPL
136638	1995 BE_{1}	—	January 25, 1995	Oizumi	T. Kobayashi	·	2.6 km	MPC · JPL
136639	1995 CD_{3}	—	February 1, 1995	Kitt Peak	Spacewatch	·	2.5 km	MPC · JPL
136640	1995 CJ_{3}	—	February 1, 1995	Kitt Peak	Spacewatch	·	2.4 km	MPC · JPL
136641	1995 CJ_{6}	—	February 1, 1995	Kitt Peak	Spacewatch	·	2.5 km	MPC · JPL
136642	1995 DF_{8}	—	February 24, 1995	Kitt Peak	Spacewatch	·	1.8 km	MPC · JPL
136643	1995 EV_{6}	—	March 2, 1995	Kitt Peak	Spacewatch	·	2.3 km	MPC · JPL
136644	1995 FC_{9}	—	March 26, 1995	Kitt Peak	Spacewatch	·	1.3 km	MPC · JPL
136645	1995 FV_{12}	—	March 27, 1995	Kitt Peak	Spacewatch	·	3.0 km	MPC · JPL
136646	1995 FW_{14}	—	March 27, 1995	Kitt Peak	Spacewatch	·	2.9 km	MPC · JPL
136647	1995 FR_{17}	—	March 28, 1995	Kitt Peak	Spacewatch	·	1.1 km	MPC · JPL
136648	1995 GQ_{2}	—	April 2, 1995	Kitt Peak	Spacewatch	·	2.1 km	MPC · JPL
136649	1995 GA_{4}	—	April 4, 1995	Kitt Peak	Spacewatch	·	2.8 km	MPC · JPL
136650	1995 HK_{2}	—	April 25, 1995	Kitt Peak	Spacewatch	·	3.7 km	MPC · JPL
136651	1995 HT_{3}	—	April 26, 1995	Kitt Peak	Spacewatch	·	3.3 km	MPC · JPL
136652	1995 MB_{1}	—	June 22, 1995	Kitt Peak	Spacewatch	GEF	2.3 km	MPC · JPL
136653	1995 MU_{1}	—	June 23, 1995	Kitt Peak	Spacewatch	615	2.9 km	MPC · JPL
136654	1995 MB_{2}	—	June 23, 1995	Kitt Peak	Spacewatch	·	1.3 km	MPC · JPL
136655	1995 MQ_{7}	—	June 30, 1995	Kitt Peak	Spacewatch	V	1.1 km	MPC · JPL
136656	1995 OP_{2}	—	July 22, 1995	Kitt Peak	Spacewatch	·	1.1 km	MPC · JPL
136657	1995 OX_{4}	—	July 22, 1995	Kitt Peak	Spacewatch	·	3.4 km	MPC · JPL
136658	1995 OQ_{6}	—	July 24, 1995	Kitt Peak	Spacewatch	·	1.9 km	MPC · JPL
136659	1995 OA_{8}	—	July 25, 1995	Kitt Peak	Spacewatch	V	1.0 km	MPC · JPL
136660	1995 OA_{12}	—	July 27, 1995	Kitt Peak	Spacewatch	·	1.8 km	MPC · JPL
136661	1995 OL_{12}	—	July 26, 1995	Kitt Peak	Spacewatch	MAS	1.0 km	MPC · JPL
136662	1995 QZ_{3}	—	August 17, 1995	Kitt Peak	Spacewatch	·	2.0 km	MPC · JPL
136663	1995 QL_{5}	—	August 22, 1995	Kitt Peak	Spacewatch	EOS	3.0 km	MPC · JPL
136664	1995 QM_{6}	—	August 22, 1995	Kitt Peak	Spacewatch	·	3.8 km	MPC · JPL
136665	1995 QB_{9}	—	August 28, 1995	Kitt Peak	Spacewatch	·	3.1 km	MPC · JPL
136666 Seidel	1995 SE	Seidel	September 17, 1995	Kleť	M. Tichý, J. Tichá	·	1.5 km	MPC · JPL
136667	1995 SZ_{7}	—	September 17, 1995	Kitt Peak	Spacewatch	·	2.9 km	MPC · JPL
136668	1995 ST_{9}	—	September 17, 1995	Kitt Peak	Spacewatch	MAS	700 m	MPC · JPL
136669	1995 SF_{11}	—	September 17, 1995	Kitt Peak	Spacewatch	·	1.9 km	MPC · JPL
136670	1995 SU_{16}	—	September 18, 1995	Kitt Peak	Spacewatch	·	7.4 km	MPC · JPL
136671	1995 SN_{17}	—	September 18, 1995	Kitt Peak	Spacewatch	·	6.3 km	MPC · JPL
136672	1995 SU_{18}	—	September 18, 1995	Kitt Peak	Spacewatch	·	3.3 km	MPC · JPL
136673	1995 SB_{20}	—	September 18, 1995	Kitt Peak	Spacewatch	·	1.3 km	MPC · JPL
136674	1995 SH_{20}	—	September 18, 1995	Kitt Peak	Spacewatch	·	2.8 km	MPC · JPL
136675	1995 SA_{23}	—	September 19, 1995	Kitt Peak	Spacewatch	MAS	1.1 km	MPC · JPL
136676	1995 ST_{24}	—	September 19, 1995	Kitt Peak	Spacewatch	·	1.7 km	MPC · JPL
136677	1995 SW_{24}	—	September 19, 1995	Kitt Peak	Spacewatch	·	1.7 km	MPC · JPL
136678	1995 SG_{25}	—	September 19, 1995	Kitt Peak	Spacewatch	·	1.4 km	MPC · JPL
136679	1995 SK_{26}	—	September 19, 1995	Kitt Peak	Spacewatch	·	2.2 km	MPC · JPL
136680	1995 SW_{27}	—	September 19, 1995	Kitt Peak	Spacewatch	·	3.3 km	MPC · JPL
136681	1995 SE_{29}	—	September 20, 1995	Kitt Peak	Spacewatch	THM	2.9 km	MPC · JPL
136682	1995 SC_{31}	—	September 20, 1995	Kitt Peak	Spacewatch	·	1.7 km	MPC · JPL
136683	1995 SG_{34}	—	September 22, 1995	Kitt Peak	Spacewatch	MAS	830 m	MPC · JPL
136684	1995 SD_{35}	—	September 22, 1995	Kitt Peak	Spacewatch	·	6.1 km	MPC · JPL
136685	1995 SJ_{35}	—	September 22, 1995	Kitt Peak	Spacewatch	·	3.6 km	MPC · JPL
136686	1995 SQ_{35}	—	September 23, 1995	Kitt Peak	Spacewatch	·	1.3 km	MPC · JPL
136687	1995 SH_{36}	—	September 23, 1995	Kitt Peak	Spacewatch	·	990 m	MPC · JPL
136688	1995 SA_{37}	—	September 24, 1995	Kitt Peak	Spacewatch	KOR	2.2 km	MPC · JPL
136689	1995 SF_{38}	—	September 24, 1995	Kitt Peak	Spacewatch	·	1.1 km	MPC · JPL
136690	1995 SE_{41}	—	September 25, 1995	Kitt Peak	Spacewatch	MAS	1.1 km	MPC · JPL
136691	1995 SC_{44}	—	September 25, 1995	Kitt Peak	Spacewatch	·	4.6 km	MPC · JPL
136692	1995 SC_{45}	—	September 25, 1995	Kitt Peak	Spacewatch	THM	2.4 km	MPC · JPL
136693	1995 SE_{45}	—	September 25, 1995	Kitt Peak	Spacewatch	·	1.3 km	MPC · JPL
136694	1995 SS_{49}	—	September 25, 1995	Kitt Peak	Spacewatch	·	1.2 km	MPC · JPL
136695	1995 SP_{50}	—	September 26, 1995	Kitt Peak	Spacewatch	·	2.0 km	MPC · JPL
136696	1995 SC_{52}	—	September 26, 1995	Kitt Peak	Spacewatch	MAS	850 m	MPC · JPL
136697	1995 SN_{60}	—	September 25, 1995	Kitt Peak	Spacewatch	NYS	1.7 km	MPC · JPL
136698	1995 SO_{63}	—	September 25, 1995	Kitt Peak	Spacewatch	·	1.4 km	MPC · JPL
136699	1995 SD_{71}	—	September 18, 1995	Kitt Peak	Spacewatch	TIR	6.5 km	MPC · JPL
136700	1995 SM_{79}	—	September 21, 1995	Kitt Peak	Spacewatch	·	1.0 km	MPC · JPL

== 136701–136800 ==
back to top

Designation			Discovery			Properties		Ref
Permanent	Provisional	Named after	Date	Site	Discoverer(s)	Category	Diam.	Ref
136701	1995 SY_{79}	—	September 21, 1995	Kitt Peak	Spacewatch	EOS	3.2 km	MPC · JPL
136702	1995 SU_{85}	—	September 25, 1995	Kitt Peak	Spacewatch	·	2.5 km	MPC · JPL
136703	1995 SJ_{88}	—	September 26, 1995	Kitt Peak	Spacewatch	·	2.6 km	MPC · JPL
136704	1995 TW	—	October 13, 1995	Kitt Peak	T. B. Spahr	·	4.8 km	MPC · JPL
136705	1995 TY_{1}	—	October 14, 1995	Xinglong	SCAP	·	1.9 km	MPC · JPL
136706	1995 TT_{4}	—	October 15, 1995	Kitt Peak	Spacewatch	·	2.7 km	MPC · JPL
136707	1995 TE_{6}	—	October 15, 1995	Kitt Peak	Spacewatch	·	5.5 km	MPC · JPL
136708	1995 TY_{7}	—	October 15, 1995	Kitt Peak	Spacewatch	·	2.4 km	MPC · JPL
136709	1995 TE_{9}	—	October 1, 1995	Kitt Peak	Spacewatch	·	1.4 km	MPC · JPL
136710	1995 UU_{10}	—	October 17, 1995	Kitt Peak	Spacewatch	NYS	1.5 km	MPC · JPL
136711	1995 UC_{11}	—	October 17, 1995	Kitt Peak	Spacewatch	·	1.5 km	MPC · JPL
136712	1995 UE_{11}	—	October 17, 1995	Kitt Peak	Spacewatch	·	5.0 km	MPC · JPL
136713	1995 US_{12}	—	October 17, 1995	Kitt Peak	Spacewatch	NYS	1.7 km	MPC · JPL
136714	1995 UX_{13}	—	October 17, 1995	Kitt Peak	Spacewatch	V	1.1 km	MPC · JPL
136715	1995 UO_{14}	—	October 17, 1995	Kitt Peak	Spacewatch	·	5.1 km	MPC · JPL
136716	1995 UA_{15}	—	October 17, 1995	Kitt Peak	Spacewatch	V	930 m	MPC · JPL
136717	1995 UM_{17}	—	October 17, 1995	Kitt Peak	Spacewatch	NYS	1.9 km	MPC · JPL
136718	1995 UP_{18}	—	October 18, 1995	Kitt Peak	Spacewatch	·	4.5 km	MPC · JPL
136719	1995 UT_{18}	—	October 18, 1995	Kitt Peak	Spacewatch	·	1.6 km	MPC · JPL
136720	1995 UD_{24}	—	October 19, 1995	Kitt Peak	Spacewatch	·	3.5 km	MPC · JPL
136721	1995 UC_{25}	—	October 19, 1995	Kitt Peak	Spacewatch	·	2.2 km	MPC · JPL
136722	1995 UO_{27}	—	October 20, 1995	Kitt Peak	Spacewatch	·	3.8 km	MPC · JPL
136723	1995 UC_{31}	—	October 20, 1995	Kitt Peak	Spacewatch	NYS	1.6 km	MPC · JPL
136724	1995 UK_{33}	—	October 21, 1995	Kitt Peak	Spacewatch	LIX	5.8 km	MPC · JPL
136725	1995 UP_{40}	—	October 23, 1995	Kitt Peak	Spacewatch	·	5.9 km	MPC · JPL
136726	1995 UH_{41}	—	October 23, 1995	Kitt Peak	Spacewatch	EOS	2.9 km	MPC · JPL
136727	1995 UB_{51}	—	October 19, 1995	Kitt Peak	Spacewatch	NYS	1.3 km	MPC · JPL
136728	1995 UW_{52}	—	October 23, 1995	Kitt Peak	Spacewatch	·	4.7 km	MPC · JPL
136729	1995 UR_{57}	—	October 17, 1995	Kitt Peak	Spacewatch	fast	2.6 km	MPC · JPL
136730	1995 UE_{59}	—	October 18, 1995	Kitt Peak	Spacewatch	NYS	1.7 km	MPC · JPL
136731	1995 US_{59}	—	October 19, 1995	Kitt Peak	Spacewatch	MAS	930 m	MPC · JPL
136732	1995 UV_{60}	—	October 24, 1995	Kitt Peak	Spacewatch	VER	5.9 km	MPC · JPL
136733	1995 UE_{61}	—	October 24, 1995	Kitt Peak	Spacewatch	EOS	3.9 km	MPC · JPL
136734	1995 VF_{6}	—	November 14, 1995	Kitt Peak	Spacewatch	·	1.6 km	MPC · JPL
136735	1995 VP_{10}	—	November 15, 1995	Kitt Peak	Spacewatch	·	4.2 km	MPC · JPL
136736	1995 VW_{10}	—	November 15, 1995	Kitt Peak	Spacewatch	·	5.5 km	MPC · JPL
136737	1995 VA_{12}	—	November 15, 1995	Kitt Peak	Spacewatch	·	2.2 km	MPC · JPL
136738	1995 VV_{12}	—	November 15, 1995	Kitt Peak	Spacewatch	·	2.3 km	MPC · JPL
136739	1995 VD_{13}	—	November 15, 1995	Kitt Peak	Spacewatch	·	5.4 km	MPC · JPL
136740	1995 VW_{14}	—	November 15, 1995	Kitt Peak	Spacewatch	HYG	3.7 km	MPC · JPL
136741	1995 VL_{16}	—	November 15, 1995	Kitt Peak	Spacewatch	NYS	1.8 km	MPC · JPL
136742	1995 VA_{17}	—	November 15, 1995	Kitt Peak	Spacewatch	·	3.2 km	MPC · JPL
136743 Echigo	1995 WW_{1}	Echigo	November 16, 1995	Chichibu	N. Satō, T. Urata	·	1.7 km	MPC · JPL
136744	1995 WP_{7}	—	November 27, 1995	Oizumi	T. Kobayashi	·	1.6 km	MPC · JPL
136745	1995 WL_{8}	—	November 29, 1995	Caussols	C. Pollas	AMO +1km	940 m	MPC · JPL
136746	1995 WJ_{17}	—	November 17, 1995	Kitt Peak	Spacewatch	HYG	3.4 km	MPC · JPL
136747	1995 WD_{18}	—	November 17, 1995	Kitt Peak	Spacewatch	HYG	4.3 km	MPC · JPL
136748	1995 WG_{23}	—	November 18, 1995	Kitt Peak	Spacewatch	V	1.0 km	MPC · JPL
136749	1995 WM_{23}	—	November 18, 1995	Kitt Peak	Spacewatch	MAS	980 m	MPC · JPL
136750	1995 YL_{5}	—	December 16, 1995	Kitt Peak	Spacewatch	·	1.7 km	MPC · JPL
136751	1995 YN_{5}	—	December 16, 1995	Kitt Peak	Spacewatch	·	5.6 km	MPC · JPL
136752	1995 YD_{11}	—	December 18, 1995	Kitt Peak	Spacewatch	·	1.8 km	MPC · JPL
136753	1995 YJ_{17}	—	December 22, 1995	Kitt Peak	Spacewatch	HYG	3.8 km	MPC · JPL
136754	1996 AA_{6}	—	January 12, 1996	Kitt Peak	Spacewatch	NYS	1.8 km	MPC · JPL
136755	1996 AH_{10}	—	January 13, 1996	Kitt Peak	Spacewatch	RAF	1.9 km	MPC · JPL
136756	1996 AO_{18}	—	January 14, 1996	Kitt Peak	Spacewatch	·	1.8 km	MPC · JPL
136757	1996 BV_{15}	—	January 20, 1996	Kitt Peak	Spacewatch	·	3.7 km	MPC · JPL
136758	1996 EC_{6}	—	March 11, 1996	Kitt Peak	Spacewatch	(5)	2.0 km	MPC · JPL
136759	1996 FB_{2}	—	March 20, 1996	Haleakala	NEAT	·	4.4 km	MPC · JPL
136760	1996 FX_{9}	—	March 20, 1996	Kitt Peak	Spacewatch	·	1.7 km	MPC · JPL
136761	1996 GH_{14}	—	April 12, 1996	Kitt Peak	Spacewatch	615	3.1 km	MPC · JPL
136762	1996 GC_{21}	—	April 14, 1996	Kitt Peak	Spacewatch	·	3.1 km	MPC · JPL
136763	1996 HU_{4}	—	April 18, 1996	Kitt Peak	Spacewatch	·	1.7 km	MPC · JPL
136764	1996 HM_{23}	—	April 20, 1996	La Silla	E. W. Elst	·	2.3 km	MPC · JPL
136765	1996 JA	—	May 5, 1996	Modra	A. Galád, Pravda, A.	·	2.6 km	MPC · JPL
136766	1996 JD_{4}	—	May 9, 1996	Kitt Peak	Spacewatch	·	3.7 km	MPC · JPL
136767	1996 JA_{9}	—	May 12, 1996	Kitt Peak	Spacewatch	·	2.5 km	MPC · JPL
136768	1996 JY_{9}	—	May 13, 1996	Kitt Peak	Spacewatch	·	2.1 km	MPC · JPL
136769	1996 OD	—	July 18, 1996	Prescott	P. G. Comba	·	3.4 km	MPC · JPL
136770	1996 PC_{1}	—	August 11, 1996	Siding Spring	R. H. McNaught	AMO · APO	270 m	MPC · JPL
136771	1996 PA_{2}	—	August 13, 1996	Haleakala	NEAT	·	1.3 km	MPC · JPL
136772	1996 RK_{20}	—	September 14, 1996	Kitt Peak	Spacewatch	AST	4.1 km	MPC · JPL
136773	1996 TR_{6}	—	October 9, 1996	Kitt Peak	Spacewatch	AMO	670 m	MPC · JPL
136774	1996 TC_{12}	—	October 3, 1996	Xinglong	SCAP	AST	2.3 km	MPC · JPL
136775	1996 TF_{21}	—	October 5, 1996	Kitt Peak	Spacewatch	·	2.4 km	MPC · JPL
136776	1996 TB_{22}	—	October 6, 1996	Kitt Peak	Spacewatch	·	940 m	MPC · JPL
136777	1996 TN_{27}	—	October 7, 1996	Kitt Peak	Spacewatch	·	6.2 km	MPC · JPL
136778	1996 TN_{37}	—	October 12, 1996	Kitt Peak	Spacewatch	KOR	1.9 km	MPC · JPL
136779	1996 TO_{68}	—	October 8, 1996	La Silla	C.-I. Lagerkvist	·	2.2 km	MPC · JPL
136780	1996 VV_{11}	—	November 4, 1996	Kitt Peak	Spacewatch	·	1.7 km	MPC · JPL
136781	1996 VA_{17}	—	November 6, 1996	Kitt Peak	Spacewatch	KOR	2.3 km	MPC · JPL
136782	1996 VJ_{26}	—	November 11, 1996	Kitt Peak	Spacewatch	·	1.1 km	MPC · JPL
136783	1996 VR_{26}	—	November 11, 1996	Kitt Peak	Spacewatch	·	3.4 km	MPC · JPL
136784	1996 WT_{1}	—	November 30, 1996	Oizumi	T. Kobayashi	·	3.5 km	MPC · JPL
136785	1996 XC_{2}	—	December 3, 1996	Prescott	P. G. Comba	V	1.2 km	MPC · JPL
136786	1996 XX_{4}	—	December 6, 1996	Kitt Peak	Spacewatch	·	1.4 km	MPC · JPL
136787	1996 XG_{10}	—	December 1, 1996	Kitt Peak	Spacewatch	·	1.4 km	MPC · JPL
136788	1996 XG_{11}	—	December 2, 1996	Kitt Peak	Spacewatch	·	1.3 km	MPC · JPL
136789	1996 XV_{11}	—	December 4, 1996	Kitt Peak	Spacewatch	·	2.4 km	MPC · JPL
136790	1996 YV_{2}	—	December 29, 1996	Chichibu	N. Satō	·	1.8 km	MPC · JPL
136791	1997 AF_{8}	—	January 2, 1997	Kitt Peak	Spacewatch	·	3.3 km	MPC · JPL
136792	1997 AU_{16}	—	January 14, 1997	Oizumi	T. Kobayashi	T_{j} (2.92)	6.7 km	MPC · JPL
136793	1997 AQ_{18}	—	January 15, 1997	Farra d'Isonzo	Farra d'Isonzo	APO	760 m	MPC · JPL
136794	1997 AS_{19}	—	January 10, 1997	Kitt Peak	Spacewatch	·	2.1 km	MPC · JPL
136795 Tatsunokingo	1997 BQ	Tatsunokingo	January 16, 1997	Kiso	T. Hasegawa	APO +1km · PHA	850 m	MPC · JPL
136796	1997 BO_{6}	—	January 30, 1997	Goodricke-Pigott	R. A. Tucker	·	3.7 km	MPC · JPL
136797	1997 CF_{1}	—	February 1, 1997	Oizumi	T. Kobayashi	·	1.3 km	MPC · JPL
136798	1997 CG_{2}	—	February 2, 1997	Kitt Peak	Spacewatch	·	1.9 km	MPC · JPL
136799	1997 CP_{5}	—	February 6, 1997	Prescott	P. G. Comba	·	1.1 km	MPC · JPL
136800	1997 CS_{13}	—	February 4, 1997	Kitt Peak	Spacewatch	·	4.8 km	MPC · JPL

== 136801–136900 ==
back to top

Designation			Discovery			Properties		Ref
Permanent	Provisional	Named after	Date	Site	Discoverer(s)	Category	Diam.	Ref
136801	1997 CC_{25}	—	February 3, 1997	Kitt Peak	Spacewatch	NYS	1.7 km	MPC · JPL
136802	1997 CB_{27}	—	February 15, 1997	Kitt Peak	Spacewatch	·	2.9 km	MPC · JPL
136803 Calliemorgan	1997 EC_{3}	Calliemorgan	March 6, 1997	Chinle	Bruton, J.	PHO	2.3 km	MPC · JPL
136804	1997 EQ_{5}	—	March 4, 1997	Kitt Peak	Spacewatch	·	1.9 km	MPC · JPL
136805	1997 EM_{30}	—	March 13, 1997	Kitt Peak	Spacewatch	·	1.8 km	MPC · JPL
136806	1997 EG_{32}	—	March 11, 1997	Kitt Peak	Spacewatch	·	1.6 km	MPC · JPL
136807	1997 EQ_{38}	—	March 5, 1997	Socorro	LINEAR	(11097)	6.6 km	MPC · JPL
136808	1997 EN_{47}	—	March 12, 1997	La Silla	E. W. Elst	NYS	2.0 km	MPC · JPL
136809	1997 GB_{1}	—	April 2, 1997	Kitt Peak	Spacewatch	·	1.4 km	MPC · JPL
136810	1997 GZ_{8}	—	April 3, 1997	Socorro	LINEAR	H	970 m	MPC · JPL
136811	1997 GG_{13}	—	April 3, 1997	Socorro	LINEAR	V	1.1 km	MPC · JPL
136812	1997 GH_{17}	—	April 3, 1997	Socorro	LINEAR	·	1.7 km	MPC · JPL
136813	1997 GM_{35}	—	April 6, 1997	Socorro	LINEAR	NYS	1.8 km	MPC · JPL
136814	1997 HB_{3}	—	April 30, 1997	Kitt Peak	Spacewatch	MAS	1.0 km	MPC · JPL
136815	1997 HL_{3}	—	April 27, 1997	Kitt Peak	Spacewatch	·	1.9 km	MPC · JPL
136816	1997 HL_{8}	—	April 30, 1997	Socorro	LINEAR	·	2.1 km	MPC · JPL
136817	1997 JR_{5}	—	May 1, 1997	Kitt Peak	Spacewatch	·	2.2 km	MPC · JPL
136818 Selqet	1997 MW_{1}	Selqet	June 29, 1997	Goodricke-Pigott	R. A. Tucker	ATE	570 m	MPC · JPL
136819	1997 MG_{7}	—	June 26, 1997	Kitt Peak	Spacewatch	BRG	2.2 km	MPC · JPL
136820	1997 MF_{9}	—	June 30, 1997	Kitt Peak	Spacewatch	·	2.1 km	MPC · JPL
136821	1997 NR_{3}	—	July 6, 1997	Kitt Peak	Spacewatch	·	1.8 km	MPC · JPL
136822	1997 PW_{4}	—	August 10, 1997	Modra	A. Galád, Pravda, A.	3:2	8.9 km	MPC · JPL
136823	1997 QR	—	August 26, 1997	Ondřejov	L. Kotková	·	2.4 km	MPC · JPL
136824 Nonamikeiko	1997 RJ_{5}	Nonamikeiko	September 8, 1997	Yatsuka	H. Abe	MRX	2.1 km	MPC · JPL
136825 Slawitschek	1997 SX_{3}	Slawitschek	September 26, 1997	Kleť	J. Tichá, M. Tichý	(5)	2.5 km	MPC · JPL
136826	1997 SM_{4}	—	September 27, 1997	Oizumi	T. Kobayashi	·	2.0 km	MPC · JPL
136827	1997 SC_{23}	—	September 29, 1997	Kitt Peak	Spacewatch	·	1.8 km	MPC · JPL
136828	1997 ST_{23}	—	September 29, 1997	Kitt Peak	Spacewatch	·	2.2 km	MPC · JPL
136829	1997 SL_{32}	—	September 30, 1997	Uenohara	S. Ueda, H. Kaneda	·	5.0 km	MPC · JPL
136830	1997 SM_{34}	—	September 27, 1997	Kitt Peak	Spacewatch	·	2.9 km	MPC · JPL
136831	1997 TA_{1}	—	October 3, 1997	Caussols	ODAS	·	1.9 km	MPC · JPL
136832	1997 TH_{27}	—	October 4, 1997	Caussols	ODAS	·	4.1 km	MPC · JPL
136833	1997 UP	—	October 19, 1997	Kleť	Kleť	·	1.2 km	MPC · JPL
136834	1997 UD_{1}	—	October 21, 1997	Ondřejov	P. Pravec	·	2.6 km	MPC · JPL
136835	1997 UL_{19}	—	October 28, 1997	Kitt Peak	Spacewatch	3:2	7.4 km	MPC · JPL
136836	1997 VO_{5}	—	November 8, 1997	Oizumi	T. Kobayashi	JUN	3.2 km	MPC · JPL
136837	1997 VV_{7}	—	November 2, 1997	Xinglong	SCAP	·	2.7 km	MPC · JPL
136838	1997 WG_{22}	—	November 28, 1997	Xinglong	SCAP	BRA	3.1 km	MPC · JPL
136839	1997 WT_{22}	—	November 29, 1997	Socorro	LINEAR	AMO	600 m	MPC · JPL
136840	1997 WN_{28}	—	November 30, 1997	Kitt Peak	Spacewatch	GAL	2.8 km	MPC · JPL
136841	1997 WU_{50}	—	November 29, 1997	Socorro	LINEAR	·	2.2 km	MPC · JPL
136842	1997 XN_{9}	—	December 6, 1997	Goodricke-Pigott	R. A. Tucker	HNS	2.4 km	MPC · JPL
136843	1997 YX_{5}	—	December 25, 1997	Oizumi	T. Kobayashi	·	5.9 km	MPC · JPL
136844	1997 YA_{11}	—	December 25, 1997	Haleakala	NEAT	·	2.9 km	MPC · JPL
136845	1997 YU_{14}	—	December 28, 1997	Kitt Peak	Spacewatch	·	2.5 km	MPC · JPL
136846	1997 YV_{14}	—	December 28, 1997	Kitt Peak	Spacewatch	·	1.3 km	MPC · JPL
136847	1998 BC_{4}	—	January 20, 1998	Nachi-Katsuura	Y. Shimizu, T. Urata	·	3.2 km	MPC · JPL
136848 Kevanpooler	1998 BF_{44}	Kevanpooler	January 25, 1998	Cima Ekar	U. Munari, M. Tombelli	·	4.7 km	MPC · JPL
136849	1998 CS_{1}	—	February 9, 1998	Xinglong	SCAP	APO +1km · PHA	1.0 km	MPC · JPL
136850	1998 DX_{2}	—	February 17, 1998	Xinglong	SCAP	·	4.6 km	MPC · JPL
136851	1998 DY_{8}	—	February 23, 1998	Kitt Peak	Spacewatch	KOR	2.2 km	MPC · JPL
136852	1998 DQ_{18}	—	February 24, 1998	Kitt Peak	Spacewatch	·	1.3 km	MPC · JPL
136853	1998 DM_{19}	—	February 24, 1998	Kitt Peak	Spacewatch	·	940 m	MPC · JPL
136854	1998 DM_{28}	—	February 26, 1998	Kitt Peak	Spacewatch	·	1.3 km	MPC · JPL
136855	1998 EE_{5}	—	March 1, 1998	Kitt Peak	Spacewatch	·	4.5 km	MPC · JPL
136856	1998 FA_{6}	—	March 18, 1998	Kitt Peak	Spacewatch	·	3.2 km	MPC · JPL
136857	1998 FD_{7}	—	March 20, 1998	Kitt Peak	Spacewatch	·	3.0 km	MPC · JPL
136858	1998 FW_{10}	—	March 24, 1998	Caussols	ODAS	·	1.0 km	MPC · JPL
136859	1998 FS_{32}	—	March 20, 1998	Socorro	LINEAR	·	1.5 km	MPC · JPL
136860	1998 FQ_{34}	—	March 20, 1998	Socorro	LINEAR	·	3.3 km	MPC · JPL
136861	1998 FJ_{39}	—	March 20, 1998	Socorro	LINEAR	·	2.5 km	MPC · JPL
136862	1998 FW_{40}	—	March 20, 1998	Socorro	LINEAR	ERI	2.9 km	MPC · JPL
136863	1998 FA_{41}	—	March 20, 1998	Socorro	LINEAR	·	1.5 km	MPC · JPL
136864	1998 FB_{41}	—	March 20, 1998	Socorro	LINEAR	·	1.9 km	MPC · JPL
136865	1998 FE_{41}	—	March 20, 1998	Socorro	LINEAR	·	1.6 km	MPC · JPL
136866	1998 FB_{46}	—	March 20, 1998	Socorro	LINEAR	·	4.3 km	MPC · JPL
136867	1998 FW_{48}	—	March 20, 1998	Socorro	LINEAR	·	3.7 km	MPC · JPL
136868	1998 FC_{49}	—	March 20, 1998	Socorro	LINEAR	·	4.0 km	MPC · JPL
136869	1998 FB_{55}	—	March 20, 1998	Socorro	LINEAR	(2076)	1.3 km	MPC · JPL
136870	1998 FC_{55}	—	March 20, 1998	Socorro	LINEAR	·	1.3 km	MPC · JPL
136871	1998 FO_{57}	—	March 20, 1998	Socorro	LINEAR	·	1.7 km	MPC · JPL
136872	1998 FZ_{66}	—	March 20, 1998	Socorro	LINEAR	NYS	1.9 km	MPC · JPL
136873	1998 FY_{68}	—	March 20, 1998	Socorro	LINEAR	·	4.2 km	MPC · JPL
136874	1998 FH_{74}	—	March 31, 1998	Socorro	LINEAR	T_{j} (2.93) · APO +1km	3.4 km	MPC · JPL
136875	1998 FV_{76}	—	March 24, 1998	Socorro	LINEAR	·	3.8 km	MPC · JPL
136876	1998 FM_{93}	—	March 24, 1998	Socorro	LINEAR	·	3.9 km	MPC · JPL
136877	1998 FB_{102}	—	March 31, 1998	Socorro	LINEAR	·	6.7 km	MPC · JPL
136878	1998 FD_{122}	—	March 20, 1998	Socorro	LINEAR	·	1.3 km	MPC · JPL
136879	1998 FH_{124}	—	March 24, 1998	Socorro	LINEAR	·	4.4 km	MPC · JPL
136880	1998 FR_{130}	—	March 22, 1998	Socorro	LINEAR	NYS	1.6 km	MPC · JPL
136881	1998 FL_{133}	—	March 20, 1998	Socorro	LINEAR	·	1.2 km	MPC · JPL
136882	1998 FE_{134}	—	March 20, 1998	Socorro	LINEAR	·	6.7 km	MPC · JPL
136883	1998 FB_{147}	—	March 25, 1998	Socorro	LINEAR	·	1.6 km	MPC · JPL
136884	1998 FC_{148}	—	March 29, 1998	Socorro	LINEAR	·	5.5 km	MPC · JPL
136885	1998 GO_{2}	—	April 2, 1998	Socorro	LINEAR	·	2.3 km	MPC · JPL
136886	1998 GL_{12}	—	April 2, 1998	La Silla	E. W. Elst	·	4.2 km	MPC · JPL
136887	1998 HQ_{9}	—	April 18, 1998	Kitt Peak	Spacewatch	·	7.7 km	MPC · JPL
136888	1998 HR_{10}	—	April 17, 1998	Kitt Peak	Spacewatch	·	1.1 km	MPC · JPL
136889	1998 HR_{17}	—	April 18, 1998	Socorro	LINEAR	·	6.0 km	MPC · JPL
136890	1998 HO_{20}	—	April 20, 1998	Socorro	LINEAR	·	4.6 km	MPC · JPL
136891	1998 HK_{23}	—	April 20, 1998	Socorro	LINEAR	·	1.8 km	MPC · JPL
136892	1998 HD_{24}	—	April 28, 1998	Kitt Peak	Spacewatch	·	1.2 km	MPC · JPL
136893	1998 HK_{25}	—	April 18, 1998	Kitt Peak	Spacewatch	·	2.3 km	MPC · JPL
136894	1998 HC_{35}	—	April 20, 1998	Socorro	LINEAR	·	1.1 km	MPC · JPL
136895	1998 HP_{38}	—	April 20, 1998	Socorro	LINEAR	·	7.7 km	MPC · JPL
136896	1998 HO_{39}	—	April 20, 1998	Socorro	LINEAR	·	6.7 km	MPC · JPL
136897	1998 HJ_{41}	—	April 28, 1998	Socorro	LINEAR	AMO	690 m	MPC · JPL
136898	1998 HM_{43}	—	April 20, 1998	Socorro	LINEAR	·	4.0 km	MPC · JPL
136899	1998 HH_{44}	—	April 20, 1998	Socorro	LINEAR	·	2.3 km	MPC · JPL
136900	1998 HL_{49}	—	April 30, 1998	Kitt Peak	Spacewatch	APO +1km	1.2 km	MPC · JPL

== 136901–137000 ==
back to top

Designation			Discovery			Properties		Ref
Permanent	Provisional	Named after	Date	Site	Discoverer(s)	Category	Diam.	Ref
136901	1998 HT_{49}	—	April 25, 1998	Kitt Peak	Spacewatch	·	2.2 km	MPC · JPL
136902	1998 HL_{55}	—	April 21, 1998	Socorro	LINEAR	·	5.5 km	MPC · JPL
136903	1998 HR_{58}	—	April 21, 1998	Socorro	LINEAR	·	1.4 km	MPC · JPL
136904	1998 HY_{59}	—	April 21, 1998	Socorro	LINEAR	·	6.8 km	MPC · JPL
136905	1998 HF_{78}	—	April 21, 1998	Socorro	LINEAR	·	6.6 km	MPC · JPL
136906	1998 HX_{83}	—	April 21, 1998	Socorro	LINEAR	·	1.2 km	MPC · JPL
136907	1998 HS_{86}	—	April 21, 1998	Socorro	LINEAR	·	1.7 km	MPC · JPL
136908	1998 HV_{92}	—	April 21, 1998	Socorro	LINEAR	·	1.1 km	MPC · JPL
136909	1998 HJ_{93}	—	April 21, 1998	Socorro	LINEAR	V	1.3 km	MPC · JPL
136910	1998 HN_{93}	—	April 21, 1998	Socorro	LINEAR	V	1.0 km	MPC · JPL
136911	1998 HQ_{95}	—	April 21, 1998	Socorro	LINEAR	·	1.5 km	MPC · JPL
136912	1998 HP_{96}	—	April 21, 1998	Socorro	LINEAR	·	1.7 km	MPC · JPL
136913	1998 HB_{100}	—	April 21, 1998	Socorro	LINEAR	·	1.3 km	MPC · JPL
136914	1998 HA_{103}	—	April 25, 1998	La Silla	E. W. Elst	·	7.5 km	MPC · JPL
136915	1998 HM_{109}	—	April 23, 1998	Socorro	LINEAR	·	8.7 km	MPC · JPL
136916	1998 HW_{115}	—	April 23, 1998	Socorro	LINEAR	·	5.1 km	MPC · JPL
136917	1998 HB_{127}	—	April 18, 1998	Socorro	LINEAR	V	1.1 km	MPC · JPL
136918	1998 HT_{133}	—	April 19, 1998	Socorro	LINEAR	·	2.3 km	MPC · JPL
136919	1998 HZ_{138}	—	April 21, 1998	Socorro	LINEAR	TIR	6.7 km	MPC · JPL
136920	1998 HN_{145}	—	April 21, 1998	Socorro	LINEAR	URS	7.2 km	MPC · JPL
136921	1998 HV_{147}	—	April 21, 1998	Socorro	LINEAR	PHO	2.8 km	MPC · JPL
136922 Brianbauer	1998 HB_{152}	Brianbauer	April 19, 1998	Anderson Mesa	M. W. Buie	·	2.6 km	MPC · JPL
136923	1998 JH_{2}	—	May 1, 1998	Kitt Peak	Spacewatch	AMO +1km	1.9 km	MPC · JPL
136924	1998 KX_{5}	—	May 24, 1998	Kitt Peak	Spacewatch	·	2.1 km	MPC · JPL
136925	1998 ME	—	June 16, 1998	Kitt Peak	Spacewatch	·	3.9 km	MPC · JPL
136926	1998 MY	—	June 16, 1998	Socorro	LINEAR	·	2.4 km	MPC · JPL
136927	1998 MA_{3}	—	June 16, 1998	Kitt Peak	Spacewatch	·	1.8 km	MPC · JPL
136928	1998 MO_{15}	—	June 20, 1998	Kitt Peak	Spacewatch	·	1.3 km	MPC · JPL
136929	1998 MA_{16}	—	June 20, 1998	Kitt Peak	Spacewatch	·	1.2 km	MPC · JPL
136930	1998 OT_{3}	—	July 24, 1998	Caussols	ODAS	·	1.7 km	MPC · JPL
136931	1998 OE_{6}	—	July 30, 1998	Višnjan Observatory	Višnjan	·	1.9 km	MPC · JPL
136932	1998 OB_{7}	—	July 28, 1998	Xinglong	SCAP	·	2.6 km	MPC · JPL
136933	1998 QX_{4}	—	August 22, 1998	Xinglong	SCAP	V	1.6 km	MPC · JPL
136934	1998 QP_{5}	—	August 19, 1998	Socorro	LINEAR	H	1.2 km	MPC · JPL
136935	1998 QK_{6}	—	August 24, 1998	Caussols	ODAS	3:2	9.5 km	MPC · JPL
136936	1998 QO_{20}	—	August 17, 1998	Socorro	LINEAR	·	1.8 km	MPC · JPL
136937	1998 QT_{28}	—	August 22, 1998	Xinglong	SCAP	·	2.1 km	MPC · JPL
136938	1998 QA_{37}	—	August 17, 1998	Socorro	LINEAR	·	1.6 km	MPC · JPL
136939	1998 QV_{43}	—	August 17, 1998	Socorro	LINEAR	NYS	2.7 km	MPC · JPL
136940	1998 QG_{45}	—	August 17, 1998	Socorro	LINEAR	slow	2.6 km	MPC · JPL
136941	1998 QT_{57}	—	August 30, 1998	Kitt Peak	Spacewatch	·	1.5 km	MPC · JPL
136942	1998 QK_{70}	—	August 24, 1998	Socorro	LINEAR	PHO	2.2 km	MPC · JPL
136943	1998 QH_{73}	—	August 24, 1998	Socorro	LINEAR	·	2.0 km	MPC · JPL
136944	1998 QK_{81}	—	August 24, 1998	Socorro	LINEAR	·	3.3 km	MPC · JPL
136945	1998 QD_{86}	—	August 24, 1998	Socorro	LINEAR	·	3.7 km	MPC · JPL
136946	1998 QY_{99}	—	August 26, 1998	La Silla	E. W. Elst	NYS	1.9 km	MPC · JPL
136947	1998 QS_{100}	—	August 26, 1998	La Silla	E. W. Elst	NYS	2.6 km	MPC · JPL
136948	1998 QO_{106}	—	August 25, 1998	La Silla	E. W. Elst	·	2.3 km	MPC · JPL
136949	1998 QE_{110}	—	August 23, 1998	Socorro	LINEAR	·	1.5 km	MPC · JPL
136950	1998 RT_{1}	—	September 14, 1998	Catalina	CSS	·	5.9 km	MPC · JPL
136951	1998 RQ_{3}	—	September 14, 1998	Socorro	LINEAR	H	850 m	MPC · JPL
136952	1998 RY_{3}	—	September 14, 1998	Socorro	LINEAR	·	2.0 km	MPC · JPL
136953	1998 RP_{4}	—	September 14, 1998	Socorro	LINEAR	H	990 m	MPC · JPL
136954	1998 RX_{4}	—	September 14, 1998	Socorro	LINEAR	H	1.0 km	MPC · JPL
136955	1998 RJ_{5}	—	September 15, 1998	Caussols	ODAS	·	2.8 km	MPC · JPL
136956	1998 RV_{6}	—	September 12, 1998	Kitt Peak	Spacewatch	·	1.7 km	MPC · JPL
136957	1998 RQ_{8}	—	September 13, 1998	Kitt Peak	Spacewatch	·	2.2 km	MPC · JPL
136958	1998 RN_{9}	—	September 13, 1998	Kitt Peak	Spacewatch	MAS	1.3 km	MPC · JPL
136959	1998 RJ_{15}	—	September 15, 1998	Kitt Peak	Spacewatch	·	2.3 km	MPC · JPL
136960	1998 RD_{27}	—	September 14, 1998	Socorro	LINEAR	·	2.3 km	MPC · JPL
136961	1998 RP_{29}	—	September 14, 1998	Socorro	LINEAR	MAS	1.5 km	MPC · JPL
136962	1998 RV_{30}	—	September 14, 1998	Socorro	LINEAR	NYS	1.8 km	MPC · JPL
136963	1998 RR_{31}	—	September 14, 1998	Socorro	LINEAR	·	2.6 km	MPC · JPL
136964	1998 RG_{36}	—	September 14, 1998	Socorro	LINEAR	V	1.1 km	MPC · JPL
136965	1998 RA_{38}	—	September 14, 1998	Socorro	LINEAR	·	1.9 km	MPC · JPL
136966	1998 RL_{39}	—	September 14, 1998	Socorro	LINEAR	NYS	2.0 km	MPC · JPL
136967	1998 RQ_{39}	—	September 14, 1998	Socorro	LINEAR	·	2.7 km	MPC · JPL
136968	1998 RY_{40}	—	September 14, 1998	Socorro	LINEAR	·	1.9 km	MPC · JPL
136969	1998 RG_{41}	—	September 14, 1998	Socorro	LINEAR	V	1.5 km	MPC · JPL
136970	1998 RS_{44}	—	September 14, 1998	Socorro	LINEAR	·	1.9 km	MPC · JPL
136971	1998 RA_{48}	—	September 14, 1998	Socorro	LINEAR	·	2.2 km	MPC · JPL
136972	1998 RA_{49}	—	September 14, 1998	Socorro	LINEAR	·	1.2 km	MPC · JPL
136973	1998 RM_{50}	—	September 14, 1998	Socorro	LINEAR	·	2.2 km	MPC · JPL
136974	1998 RO_{50}	—	September 14, 1998	Socorro	LINEAR	MAS	1.4 km	MPC · JPL
136975	1998 RS_{51}	—	September 14, 1998	Socorro	LINEAR	·	1.9 km	MPC · JPL
136976	1998 RA_{61}	—	September 14, 1998	Socorro	LINEAR	·	3.6 km	MPC · JPL
136977	1998 RM_{61}	—	September 14, 1998	Socorro	LINEAR	·	2.5 km	MPC · JPL
136978	1998 RH_{65}	—	September 14, 1998	Socorro	LINEAR	·	1.7 km	MPC · JPL
136979	1998 RX_{76}	—	September 14, 1998	Socorro	LINEAR	·	2.3 km	MPC · JPL
136980	1998 SR	—	September 16, 1998	Caussols	ODAS	·	1.7 km	MPC · JPL
136981	1998 SF_{3}	—	September 17, 1998	Caussols	ODAS	V	1.2 km	MPC · JPL
136982	1998 SK_{3}	—	September 17, 1998	Caussols	ODAS	ERI	4.2 km	MPC · JPL
136983	1998 SN_{4}	—	September 17, 1998	Kitt Peak	Spacewatch	MAS	1.7 km	MPC · JPL
136984	1998 SW_{10}	—	September 21, 1998	Ondřejov	P. Pravec	·	2.1 km	MPC · JPL
136985	1998 SD_{12}	—	September 22, 1998	Caussols	ODAS	(194)	2.3 km	MPC · JPL
136986	1998 SX_{15}	—	September 16, 1998	Kitt Peak	Spacewatch	·	1.2 km	MPC · JPL
136987	1998 SV_{20}	—	September 21, 1998	Kitt Peak	Spacewatch	·	1.6 km	MPC · JPL
136988	1998 SO_{33}	—	September 26, 1998	Socorro	LINEAR	H	950 m	MPC · JPL
136989	1998 SX_{33}	—	September 26, 1998	Socorro	LINEAR	H	1.0 km	MPC · JPL
136990	1998 SW_{34}	—	September 26, 1998	Socorro	LINEAR	H	1.0 km	MPC · JPL
136991	1998 SA_{36}	—	September 28, 1998	Prescott	P. G. Comba	·	1.6 km	MPC · JPL
136992	1998 SL_{45}	—	September 25, 1998	Kitt Peak	Spacewatch	slow?	2.6 km	MPC · JPL
136993	1998 ST_{49}	—	September 29, 1998	Socorro	LINEAR	APO +1km · moon	960 m	MPC · JPL
136994	1998 SX_{56}	—	September 17, 1998	Anderson Mesa	LONEOS	·	3.3 km	MPC · JPL
136995	1998 SD_{57}	—	September 17, 1998	Anderson Mesa	LONEOS	MAS	1.4 km	MPC · JPL
136996	1998 SJ_{63}	—	September 26, 1998	Xinglong	SCAP	·	3.8 km	MPC · JPL
136997	1998 SP_{72}	—	September 21, 1998	La Silla	E. W. Elst	MAS	1.7 km	MPC · JPL
136998	1998 SG_{75}	—	September 21, 1998	La Silla	E. W. Elst	·	1.7 km	MPC · JPL
136999	1998 SG_{76}	—	September 19, 1998	Socorro	LINEAR	·	1.8 km	MPC · JPL
137000	1998 SH_{78}	—	September 26, 1998	Socorro	LINEAR	·	2.1 km	MPC · JPL

back to top

== See also ==
- Meanings of minor-planet names: 136001–137000
