= Pic du Midi =

Pic du Midi or Pic-du-Midi may refer to:

- 20488 Pic-du-Midi, a main-belt asteroid
- Pic du Midi Observatory, astronomical observatory
- Pic du Midi de Bigorre, a mountain in the French Pyrenees famous for its astronomical observatory.
- Pic du Midi d'Ossau, another mountain in the French Pyrenees
