= Aigoual =

Aigoual may refer to:

- Mont Aigoual, the highest point of the Gard département, France
- 31192 Aigoual, asteroid
