= List of minor planets: 644001–645000 =

The following is a partial list of minor planets, running from minor-planet number 644001 through 645000, inclusive. The primary data for this and other partial lists is based on JPL's "Small-Body Orbital Elements" and data available from the Minor Planet Center. Critical list information is also provided by the MPC, unless otherwise specified from Lowell Observatory. A detailed description of the table's columns and additional sources are given on the main page including a complete list of every page in this series, and a statistical break-up on the dynamical classification of minor planets.

Also see the summary list of all named bodies in numerical and alphabetical order, and the corresponding naming citations for the number range of this particular list. New namings may only be added to this list after official publication, as the preannouncement of names is condemned by the Working Group for Small Bodies Nomenclature of the International Astronomical Union.

Near-Earth obj.	MBA (inner)	MBA (outer)	Centaur
Mars-crosser	MBA (middle)	Jupiter trojan	Trans-Neptunian obj.
Unclassified

== 644001–644100 ==
Designation			Discovery			Properties		Ref
Permanent	Provisional	Named after	Date	Site	Discoverer(s)	Category	Diam.	Ref
644001	2006 SF_{355}	—	September 19, 2006	Kitt Peak	Spacewatch	EOS	1.4 km	MPC · JPL
644002	2006 SK_{359}	—	September 30, 2006	Catalina	CSS	(1547)	1.6 km	MPC · JPL
644003	2006 SO_{359}	—	September 30, 2006	Kitt Peak	Spacewatch	EMA	2.4 km	MPC · JPL
644004	2006 SD_{361}	—	September 30, 2006	Mount Lemmon	Mount Lemmon Survey	·	640 m	MPC · JPL
644005	2006 ST_{361}	—	September 30, 2006	Mount Lemmon	Mount Lemmon Survey	·	2.1 km	MPC · JPL
644006	2006 SA_{362}	—	September 30, 2006	Mount Lemmon	Mount Lemmon Survey	·	1.5 km	MPC · JPL
644007	2006 SO_{362}	—	September 30, 2006	Mount Lemmon	Mount Lemmon Survey	·	2.5 km	MPC · JPL
644008	2006 SA_{367}	—	September 24, 2006	Anderson Mesa	LONEOS	·	1.8 km	MPC · JPL
644009	2006 SD_{368}	—	September 26, 2006	Kitt Peak	Spacewatch	·	2.8 km	MPC · JPL
644010	2006 SC_{371}	—	September 27, 2006	Catalina	CSS	·	3.6 km	MPC · JPL
644011	2006 SY_{373}	—	October 11, 2006	Palomar	NEAT	·	990 m	MPC · JPL
644012	2006 SF_{374}	—	September 16, 2006	Apache Point	SDSS Collaboration	·	2.2 km	MPC · JPL
644013	2006 SN_{374}	—	September 16, 2006	Apache Point	SDSS Collaboration	·	1.9 km	MPC · JPL
644014	2006 SP_{376}	—	September 17, 2006	Apache Point	SDSS Collaboration	·	2.1 km	MPC · JPL
644015	2006 SR_{377}	—	October 2, 2006	Mount Lemmon	Mount Lemmon Survey	·	2.2 km	MPC · JPL
644016	2006 SM_{378}	—	September 18, 2006	Apache Point	SDSS Collaboration	·	2.9 km	MPC · JPL
644017	2006 SJ_{379}	—	September 26, 2006	Mount Lemmon	Mount Lemmon Survey	·	2.2 km	MPC · JPL
644018	2006 SK_{380}	—	September 19, 2006	Apache Point	SDSS Collaboration	·	2.7 km	MPC · JPL
644019	2006 SV_{380}	—	September 27, 2006	Apache Point	SDSS Collaboration	EUN	670 m	MPC · JPL
644020	2006 SJ_{384}	—	September 29, 2006	Apache Point	SDSS Collaboration	ELF	2.5 km	MPC · JPL
644021	2006 SR_{384}	—	October 2, 2006	Mount Lemmon	Mount Lemmon Survey	·	1.2 km	MPC · JPL
644022	2006 SR_{385}	—	August 28, 2006	Apache Point	SDSS Collaboration	·	2.3 km	MPC · JPL
644023	2006 SO_{387}	—	October 2, 2006	Mount Lemmon	Mount Lemmon Survey	·	2.5 km	MPC · JPL
644024	2006 SX_{387}	—	October 2, 2006	Mount Lemmon	Mount Lemmon Survey	·	2.2 km	MPC · JPL
644025	2006 SD_{388}	—	September 30, 2006	Apache Point	SDSS Collaboration	·	2.2 km	MPC · JPL
644026	2006 SW_{388}	—	September 16, 2006	Apache Point	SDSS Collaboration	·	2.1 km	MPC · JPL
644027	2006 SO_{389}	—	September 30, 2006	Apache Point	SDSS Collaboration	EOS	1.6 km	MPC · JPL
644028	2006 SB_{390}	—	September 30, 2006	Apache Point	SDSS Collaboration	·	2.6 km	MPC · JPL
644029	2006 SL_{390}	—	September 30, 2006	Apache Point	SDSS Collaboration	EUN	940 m	MPC · JPL
644030	2006 SM_{390}	—	September 30, 2006	Apache Point	SDSS Collaboration	·	2.2 km	MPC · JPL
644031	2006 SQ_{396}	—	September 17, 2006	Kitt Peak	Spacewatch	·	1.9 km	MPC · JPL
644032	2006 SL_{399}	—	September 17, 2006	Catalina	CSS	(1547)	1.7 km	MPC · JPL
644033	2006 SM_{405}	—	September 17, 2006	Kitt Peak	Spacewatch	EOS	1.5 km	MPC · JPL
644034	2006 SH_{407}	—	September 19, 2006	Kitt Peak	Spacewatch	·	1.1 km	MPC · JPL
644035	2006 SA_{408}	—	September 26, 2006	Mount Lemmon	Mount Lemmon Survey	HNS	950 m	MPC · JPL
644036	2006 SG_{408}	—	September 28, 2006	Mount Lemmon	Mount Lemmon Survey	·	560 m	MPC · JPL
644037	2006 SC_{410}	—	September 17, 2006	Kitt Peak	Spacewatch	EOS	1.3 km	MPC · JPL
644038	2006 SD_{416}	—	September 17, 2006	Kitt Peak	Spacewatch	·	1.4 km	MPC · JPL
644039	2006 SR_{420}	—	October 22, 2012	Haleakala	Pan-STARRS 1	·	1.8 km	MPC · JPL
644040	2006 SZ_{422}	—	September 15, 2006	Kitt Peak	Spacewatch	·	2.3 km	MPC · JPL
644041	2006 SD_{424}	—	September 28, 2006	Mount Lemmon	Mount Lemmon Survey	·	650 m	MPC · JPL
644042	2006 SQ_{424}	—	September 30, 2006	Mount Lemmon	Mount Lemmon Survey	(5)	1.0 km	MPC · JPL
644043	2006 SZ_{424}	—	September 28, 2006	Mount Lemmon	Mount Lemmon Survey	T_{j} (2.96)	4.0 km	MPC · JPL
644044	2006 SB_{425}	—	September 27, 2006	Mount Lemmon	Mount Lemmon Survey	THB	3.2 km	MPC · JPL
644045	2006 SD_{425}	—	August 24, 2011	Haleakala	Pan-STARRS 1	EOS	1.8 km	MPC · JPL
644046	2006 SE_{426}	—	September 16, 2006	Kitt Peak	Spacewatch	·	550 m	MPC · JPL
644047	2006 SO_{426}	—	September 30, 2006	Kitt Peak	Spacewatch	EOS	1.6 km	MPC · JPL
644048	2006 SS_{426}	—	May 21, 2015	Haleakala	Pan-STARRS 1	·	1.5 km	MPC · JPL
644049	2006 SD_{427}	—	September 17, 2006	Kitt Peak	Spacewatch	·	2.1 km	MPC · JPL
644050	2006 SG_{427}	—	September 17, 2006	Kitt Peak	Spacewatch	EOS	1.5 km	MPC · JPL
644051	2006 SO_{427}	—	September 17, 2006	Kitt Peak	Spacewatch	·	1.8 km	MPC · JPL
644052	2006 SP_{427}	—	September 18, 2006	Kitt Peak	Spacewatch	·	2.1 km	MPC · JPL
644053	2006 SA_{428}	—	September 27, 2006	Mount Lemmon	Mount Lemmon Survey	·	2.9 km	MPC · JPL
644054	2006 SC_{428}	—	September 27, 2006	Kitt Peak	Spacewatch	·	610 m	MPC · JPL
644055	2006 SP_{428}	—	September 30, 2006	Kitt Peak	Spacewatch	H	450 m	MPC · JPL
644056	2006 SW_{428}	—	December 30, 2007	Mount Lemmon	Mount Lemmon Survey	·	1.8 km	MPC · JPL
644057	2006 SH_{429}	—	September 25, 2006	Kitt Peak	Spacewatch	(5)	760 m	MPC · JPL
644058	2006 SJ_{429}	—	August 28, 2006	Catalina	CSS	·	550 m	MPC · JPL
644059	2006 SS_{429}	—	September 27, 2006	Kitt Peak	Spacewatch	·	2.4 km	MPC · JPL
644060	2006 SW_{429}	—	December 4, 2012	Mount Lemmon	Mount Lemmon Survey	·	2.0 km	MPC · JPL
644061	2006 SY_{429}	—	September 25, 2006	Kitt Peak	Spacewatch	THM	1.9 km	MPC · JPL
644062	2006 SC_{430}	—	January 2, 2012	Mount Lemmon	Mount Lemmon Survey	·	1.1 km	MPC · JPL
644063	2006 SD_{433}	—	September 28, 2006	Mount Lemmon	Mount Lemmon Survey	·	2.1 km	MPC · JPL
644064	2006 SC_{434}	—	September 15, 2006	Kitt Peak	Spacewatch	EOS	1.6 km	MPC · JPL
644065	2006 SD_{434}	—	September 25, 2006	Kitt Peak	Spacewatch	·	970 m	MPC · JPL
644066	2006 SL_{434}	—	May 28, 2014	Haleakala	Pan-STARRS 1	·	1.2 km	MPC · JPL
644067	2006 SM_{434}	—	September 28, 2006	Kitt Peak	Spacewatch	JUN	810 m	MPC · JPL
644068	2006 SG_{435}	—	April 16, 2018	Haleakala	Pan-STARRS 1	·	1.5 km	MPC · JPL
644069	2006 SV_{435}	—	September 26, 2006	Kitt Peak	Spacewatch	·	560 m	MPC · JPL
644070	2006 SJ_{436}	—	July 5, 2016	Haleakala	Pan-STARRS 1	·	1.7 km	MPC · JPL
644071	2006 SK_{436}	—	February 13, 2011	Mount Lemmon	Mount Lemmon Survey	·	510 m	MPC · JPL
644072	2006 SM_{436}	—	December 11, 2012	Mount Lemmon	Mount Lemmon Survey	·	2.1 km	MPC · JPL
644073	2006 SH_{437}	—	July 30, 2017	Haleakala	Pan-STARRS 1	·	2.8 km	MPC · JPL
644074	2006 SU_{437}	—	September 16, 2006	Kitt Peak	Spacewatch	·	2.3 km	MPC · JPL
644075	2006 SV_{437}	—	September 15, 2006	Kitt Peak	Spacewatch	·	1.6 km	MPC · JPL
644076	2006 SY_{437}	—	September 19, 2017	Haleakala	Pan-STARRS 1	·	2.1 km	MPC · JPL
644077	2006 SU_{438}	—	September 26, 2017	Mount Lemmon	Mount Lemmon Survey	EOS	1.5 km	MPC · JPL
644078	2006 SL_{439}	—	September 17, 2006	Kitt Peak	Spacewatch	·	440 m	MPC · JPL
644079	2006 SL_{440}	—	September 17, 2006	Kitt Peak	Spacewatch	·	1.4 km	MPC · JPL
644080	2006 SM_{442}	—	September 18, 2006	Kitt Peak	Spacewatch	·	1.1 km	MPC · JPL
644081	2006 SO_{442}	—	February 6, 2016	Haleakala	Pan-STARRS 1	(5)	750 m	MPC · JPL
644082	2006 SW_{442}	—	October 20, 2016	Mount Lemmon	Mount Lemmon Survey	·	490 m	MPC · JPL
644083	2006 SH_{443}	—	January 31, 2016	Haleakala	Pan-STARRS 1	(5)	670 m	MPC · JPL
644084	2006 SR_{443}	—	September 19, 2006	Kitt Peak	Spacewatch	·	1.8 km	MPC · JPL
644085	2006 SZ_{443}	—	September 26, 2006	Kitt Peak	Spacewatch	·	2.2 km	MPC · JPL
644086	2006 SK_{444}	—	September 16, 2006	Kitt Peak	Spacewatch	·	980 m	MPC · JPL
644087	2006 ST_{445}	—	September 17, 2006	Catalina	CSS	·	2.6 km	MPC · JPL
644088	2006 SS_{447}	—	September 26, 2006	Catalina	CSS	·	2.5 km	MPC · JPL
644089	2006 SK_{449}	—	September 25, 2006	Kitt Peak	Spacewatch	·	640 m	MPC · JPL
644090	2006 SM_{449}	—	September 17, 2006	Kitt Peak	Spacewatch	·	790 m	MPC · JPL
644091	2006 SO_{449}	—	September 30, 2006	Kitt Peak	Spacewatch	·	2.2 km	MPC · JPL
644092	2006 SH_{450}	—	September 19, 2006	Kitt Peak	Spacewatch	·	1.9 km	MPC · JPL
644093	2006 SV_{453}	—	September 26, 2006	Kitt Peak	Spacewatch	·	2.5 km	MPC · JPL
644094	2006 SK_{454}	—	September 17, 2006	Kitt Peak	Spacewatch	·	480 m	MPC · JPL
644095	2006 SN_{454}	—	September 18, 2006	Kitt Peak	Spacewatch	·	2.5 km	MPC · JPL
644096	2006 SS_{454}	—	September 17, 2006	Kitt Peak	Spacewatch	·	1.0 km	MPC · JPL
644097	2006 SU_{454}	—	September 17, 2006	Kitt Peak	Spacewatch	·	630 m	MPC · JPL
644098	2006 SX_{454}	—	September 27, 2006	Kitt Peak	Spacewatch	·	2.1 km	MPC · JPL
644099	2006 SL_{455}	—	September 28, 2006	Kitt Peak	Spacewatch	·	750 m	MPC · JPL
644100	2006 SO_{455}	—	September 17, 2006	Kitt Peak	Spacewatch	·	2.4 km	MPC · JPL

== 644101–644200 ==
back to top

Designation			Discovery			Properties		Ref
Permanent	Provisional	Named after	Date	Site	Discoverer(s)	Category	Diam.	Ref
644101	2006 SW_{455}	—	September 30, 2006	Mount Lemmon	Mount Lemmon Survey	·	830 m	MPC · JPL
644102	2006 SS_{456}	—	September 30, 2006	Kitt Peak	Spacewatch	(5651)	1.9 km	MPC · JPL
644103	2006 SK_{457}	—	September 25, 2006	Kitt Peak	Spacewatch	·	1.6 km	MPC · JPL
644104	2006 SN_{458}	—	September 28, 2006	Kitt Peak	Spacewatch	·	1.7 km	MPC · JPL
644105	2006 SE_{459}	—	September 30, 2006	Mount Lemmon	Mount Lemmon Survey	·	1.5 km	MPC · JPL
644106	2006 TE_{2}	—	October 1, 2006	Kitt Peak	Spacewatch	·	450 m	MPC · JPL
644107	2006 TA_{6}	—	October 2, 2006	Mount Lemmon	Mount Lemmon Survey	·	2.1 km	MPC · JPL
644108	2006 TE_{6}	—	October 3, 2006	Mount Lemmon	Mount Lemmon Survey	·	450 m	MPC · JPL
644109	2006 TF_{6}	—	October 3, 2006	Mount Lemmon	Mount Lemmon Survey	·	2.7 km	MPC · JPL
644110	2006 TH_{10}	—	October 14, 2006	Piszkéstető	K. Sárneczky, Kuli, Z.	·	2.4 km	MPC · JPL
644111	2006 TU_{19}	—	October 11, 2006	Kitt Peak	Spacewatch	(5)	820 m	MPC · JPL
644112	2006 TP_{23}	—	September 25, 2006	Mount Lemmon	Mount Lemmon Survey	(895)	2.8 km	MPC · JPL
644113	2006 TH_{28}	—	October 12, 2006	Kitt Peak	Spacewatch	·	570 m	MPC · JPL
644114	2006 TT_{32}	—	October 12, 2006	Kitt Peak	Spacewatch	·	980 m	MPC · JPL
644115	2006 TG_{38}	—	October 12, 2006	Kitt Peak	Spacewatch	·	1.2 km	MPC · JPL
644116	2006 TO_{38}	—	October 12, 2006	Kitt Peak	Spacewatch	·	2.5 km	MPC · JPL
644117	2006 TN_{47}	—	September 26, 2006	Mount Lemmon	Mount Lemmon Survey	·	2.1 km	MPC · JPL
644118	2006 TQ_{49}	—	September 26, 2006	Mount Lemmon	Mount Lemmon Survey	·	2.5 km	MPC · JPL
644119	2006 TJ_{53}	—	October 4, 2006	Mount Lemmon	Mount Lemmon Survey	·	860 m	MPC · JPL
644120	2006 TS_{55}	—	October 12, 2006	Palomar	NEAT	·	890 m	MPC · JPL
644121	2006 TB_{57}	—	August 29, 2006	Kitt Peak	Spacewatch	·	2.7 km	MPC · JPL
644122	2006 TW_{58}	—	September 30, 2006	Mount Lemmon	Mount Lemmon Survey	·	2.1 km	MPC · JPL
644123	2006 TB_{62}	—	September 28, 2006	Catalina	CSS	EUP	2.8 km	MPC · JPL
644124	2006 TU_{64}	—	October 11, 2006	Kitt Peak	Spacewatch	·	740 m	MPC · JPL
644125	2006 TR_{65}	—	September 28, 2006	Catalina	CSS	EUN	1.0 km	MPC · JPL
644126	2006 TC_{73}	—	October 2, 2006	Mount Lemmon	Mount Lemmon Survey	·	3.1 km	MPC · JPL
644127	2006 TQ_{73}	—	October 11, 2006	Palomar	NEAT	·	3.1 km	MPC · JPL
644128	2006 TD_{77}	—	September 29, 2006	Anderson Mesa	LONEOS	THB	3.9 km	MPC · JPL
644129	2006 TC_{88}	—	September 18, 2006	Catalina	CSS	·	1.6 km	MPC · JPL
644130	2006 TM_{89}	—	October 4, 2006	Mount Lemmon	Mount Lemmon Survey	·	1.4 km	MPC · JPL
644131	2006 TX_{93}	—	October 2, 2006	Mount Lemmon	Mount Lemmon Survey	TIR	2.7 km	MPC · JPL
644132	2006 TT_{97}	—	September 30, 2006	Mount Lemmon	Mount Lemmon Survey	·	3.1 km	MPC · JPL
644133	2006 TV_{97}	—	October 13, 2006	Kitt Peak	Spacewatch	·	540 m	MPC · JPL
644134	2006 TC_{99}	—	September 18, 2006	Kitt Peak	Spacewatch	·	2.3 km	MPC · JPL
644135	2006 TR_{103}	—	September 30, 2006	Mount Lemmon	Mount Lemmon Survey	·	1.5 km	MPC · JPL
644136	2006 TW_{105}	—	October 11, 2006	Palomar	NEAT	·	2.0 km	MPC · JPL
644137	2006 TK_{106}	—	October 2, 2006	Mount Lemmon	Mount Lemmon Survey	LIX	2.1 km	MPC · JPL
644138	2006 TS_{108}	—	October 2, 2006	Mount Lemmon	Mount Lemmon Survey	·	2.6 km	MPC · JPL
644139	2006 TU_{111}	—	October 1, 2006	Apache Point	SDSS Collaboration	LIX	2.5 km	MPC · JPL
644140	2006 TC_{112}	—	October 1, 2006	Apache Point	SDSS Collaboration	·	2.4 km	MPC · JPL
644141	2006 TG_{112}	—	October 1, 2006	Apache Point	SDSS Collaboration	·	1.1 km	MPC · JPL
644142	2006 TU_{112}	—	October 1, 2006	Apache Point	SDSS Collaboration	·	2.1 km	MPC · JPL
644143	2006 TY_{113}	—	October 17, 2006	Catalina	CSS	·	630 m	MPC · JPL
644144	2006 TE_{114}	—	October 1, 2006	Apache Point	SDSS Collaboration	VER	2.2 km	MPC · JPL
644145	2006 TU_{115}	—	October 2, 2006	Apache Point	SDSS Collaboration	·	1.6 km	MPC · JPL
644146	2006 TW_{115}	—	September 18, 2006	Apache Point	SDSS Collaboration	VER	2.0 km	MPC · JPL
644147	2006 TJ_{117}	—	October 3, 2006	Apache Point	SDSS Collaboration	·	2.3 km	MPC · JPL
644148	2006 TL_{118}	—	October 3, 2006	Apache Point	SDSS Collaboration	·	1.1 km	MPC · JPL
644149	2006 TR_{118}	—	September 16, 2006	Apache Point	SDSS Collaboration	·	1.9 km	MPC · JPL
644150	2006 TC_{119}	—	October 16, 2006	Catalina	CSS	·	2.0 km	MPC · JPL
644151	2006 TK_{119}	—	October 11, 2006	Apache Point	SDSS Collaboration	VER	1.9 km	MPC · JPL
644152	2006 TN_{119}	—	October 11, 2006	Apache Point	SDSS Collaboration	·	2.4 km	MPC · JPL
644153	2006 TG_{120}	—	October 12, 2006	Apache Point	SDSS Collaboration	(1118)	2.1 km	MPC · JPL
644154	2006 TU_{120}	—	October 12, 2006	Apache Point	SDSS Collaboration	·	2.9 km	MPC · JPL
644155	2006 TF_{123}	—	October 13, 2006	Kitt Peak	Spacewatch	·	2.7 km	MPC · JPL
644156	2006 TL_{123}	—	October 15, 2006	Lulin	LUSS	·	1.1 km	MPC · JPL
644157	2006 TD_{125}	—	October 11, 2006	Palomar	NEAT	·	1.5 km	MPC · JPL
644158	2006 TU_{126}	—	October 2, 2006	Mount Lemmon	Mount Lemmon Survey	·	590 m	MPC · JPL
644159	2006 TC_{129}	—	October 3, 2006	Kitt Peak	Spacewatch	·	2.2 km	MPC · JPL
644160	2006 TY_{129}	—	October 11, 2006	Palomar	NEAT	·	1.3 km	MPC · JPL
644161	2006 TB_{131}	—	October 2, 2006	Mount Lemmon	Mount Lemmon Survey	·	1.5 km	MPC · JPL
644162	2006 TD_{131}	—	October 2, 2006	Mount Lemmon	Mount Lemmon Survey	THM	1.5 km	MPC · JPL
644163	2006 TM_{131}	—	October 2, 2006	Catalina	CSS	·	600 m	MPC · JPL
644164	2006 TO_{131}	—	October 2, 2006	Kitt Peak	Spacewatch	·	1.9 km	MPC · JPL
644165	2006 TE_{132}	—	October 2, 2006	Mount Lemmon	Mount Lemmon Survey	HYG	1.7 km	MPC · JPL
644166	2006 TK_{132}	—	October 2, 2006	Mount Lemmon	Mount Lemmon Survey	·	2.1 km	MPC · JPL
644167	2006 TM_{132}	—	October 2, 2006	Mount Lemmon	Mount Lemmon Survey	·	2.1 km	MPC · JPL
644168	2006 TO_{132}	—	October 2, 2006	Mount Lemmon	Mount Lemmon Survey	HNS	820 m	MPC · JPL
644169	2006 TP_{132}	—	October 2, 2006	Mount Lemmon	Mount Lemmon Survey	·	610 m	MPC · JPL
644170	2006 TX_{132}	—	October 3, 2006	Mount Lemmon	Mount Lemmon Survey	·	590 m	MPC · JPL
644171	2006 TB_{133}	—	October 3, 2006	Mount Lemmon	Mount Lemmon Survey	·	930 m	MPC · JPL
644172	2006 TC_{133}	—	October 3, 2006	Mount Lemmon	Mount Lemmon Survey	·	2.0 km	MPC · JPL
644173	2006 TL_{133}	—	October 4, 2006	Mount Lemmon	Mount Lemmon Survey	·	2.7 km	MPC · JPL
644174	2006 TN_{133}	—	October 4, 2006	Mount Lemmon	Mount Lemmon Survey	·	550 m	MPC · JPL
644175	2006 TQ_{133}	—	October 4, 2006	Mount Lemmon	Mount Lemmon Survey	EUN	900 m	MPC · JPL
644176	2006 TT_{133}	—	October 4, 2006	Mount Lemmon	Mount Lemmon Survey	·	710 m	MPC · JPL
644177	2006 TC_{134}	—	October 3, 2006	Mount Lemmon	Mount Lemmon Survey	·	2.0 km	MPC · JPL
644178	2006 TK_{134}	—	February 10, 2008	Mount Lemmon	Mount Lemmon Survey	(5)	940 m	MPC · JPL
644179	2006 TP_{134}	—	April 23, 2015	Haleakala	Pan-STARRS 1	·	1.9 km	MPC · JPL
644180	2006 TU_{135}	—	October 4, 2006	Mount Lemmon	Mount Lemmon Survey	·	1.8 km	MPC · JPL
644181	2006 TW_{135}	—	October 3, 2006	Mount Lemmon	Mount Lemmon Survey	·	1.8 km	MPC · JPL
644182	2006 TA_{136}	—	October 3, 2006	Mount Lemmon	Mount Lemmon Survey	·	550 m	MPC · JPL
644183	2006 TF_{136}	—	October 2, 2006	Mount Lemmon	Mount Lemmon Survey	·	2.6 km	MPC · JPL
644184	2006 TK_{136}	—	October 11, 2006	Palomar	NEAT	THB	2.4 km	MPC · JPL
644185	2006 TS_{137}	—	October 2, 2006	Kitt Peak	Spacewatch	·	540 m	MPC · JPL
644186	2006 TD_{138}	—	September 20, 2009	Mount Lemmon	Mount Lemmon Survey	·	570 m	MPC · JPL
644187	2006 TM_{138}	—	November 18, 2016	Mount Lemmon	Mount Lemmon Survey	·	520 m	MPC · JPL
644188	2006 TX_{138}	—	October 2, 2006	Mount Lemmon	Mount Lemmon Survey	MIS	1.5 km	MPC · JPL
644189	2006 TD_{140}	—	October 2, 2006	Mount Lemmon	Mount Lemmon Survey	·	2.2 km	MPC · JPL
644190	2006 TW_{140}	—	October 2, 2006	Mount Lemmon	Mount Lemmon Survey	·	700 m	MPC · JPL
644191	2006 TA_{143}	—	October 3, 2006	Mount Lemmon	Mount Lemmon Survey	·	1.1 km	MPC · JPL
644192	2006 TB_{146}	—	October 13, 2006	Kitt Peak	Spacewatch	·	1.9 km	MPC · JPL
644193	2006 TX_{146}	—	October 3, 2006	Mount Lemmon	Mount Lemmon Survey	·	2.5 km	MPC · JPL
644194	2006 UA_{11}	—	September 30, 2006	Mount Lemmon	Mount Lemmon Survey	·	2.0 km	MPC · JPL
644195	2006 UC_{15}	—	October 17, 2006	Mount Lemmon	Mount Lemmon Survey	·	1.3 km	MPC · JPL
644196	2006 UL_{19}	—	September 22, 1995	Kitt Peak	Spacewatch	·	1.7 km	MPC · JPL
644197	2006 UT_{20}	—	October 16, 2006	Kitt Peak	Spacewatch	·	500 m	MPC · JPL
644198	2006 UT_{25}	—	September 26, 2006	Mount Lemmon	Mount Lemmon Survey	·	2.0 km	MPC · JPL
644199	2006 UD_{29}	—	October 16, 2006	Kitt Peak	Spacewatch	T_{j} (2.99) · 3:2 · SHU	3.2 km	MPC · JPL
644200	2006 UL_{30}	—	October 3, 2006	Kitt Peak	Spacewatch	JUN	750 m	MPC · JPL

== 644201–644300 ==
back to top

Designation			Discovery			Properties		Ref
Permanent	Provisional	Named after	Date	Site	Discoverer(s)	Category	Diam.	Ref
644201	2006 UR_{33}	—	October 16, 2006	Kitt Peak	Spacewatch	THM	1.6 km	MPC · JPL
644202	2006 UE_{34}	—	September 30, 2006	Mount Lemmon	Mount Lemmon Survey	·	1.8 km	MPC · JPL
644203	2006 UY_{35}	—	September 30, 2006	Mount Lemmon	Mount Lemmon Survey	·	2.3 km	MPC · JPL
644204	2006 US_{38}	—	October 16, 2006	Kitt Peak	Spacewatch	·	950 m	MPC · JPL
644205	2006 UV_{39}	—	October 16, 2006	Kitt Peak	Spacewatch	·	2.4 km	MPC · JPL
644206	2006 UL_{47}	—	October 16, 2006	Bergisch Gladbach	W. Bickel	·	1.2 km	MPC · JPL
644207	2006 UM_{48}	—	October 17, 2006	Kitt Peak	Spacewatch	EOS	1.7 km	MPC · JPL
644208	2006 UT_{48}	—	September 17, 2006	Catalina	CSS	EUN	730 m	MPC · JPL
644209	2006 UQ_{50}	—	September 25, 2006	Kitt Peak	Spacewatch	·	2.0 km	MPC · JPL
644210	2006 UC_{54}	—	July 31, 2000	Cerro Tololo	Deep Ecliptic Survey	·	2.5 km	MPC · JPL
644211	2006 UR_{55}	—	October 18, 2006	Kitt Peak	Spacewatch	·	1.7 km	MPC · JPL
644212	2006 US_{55}	—	October 18, 2006	Kitt Peak	Spacewatch	(43176)	3.0 km	MPC · JPL
644213	2006 UA_{57}	—	October 18, 2006	Kitt Peak	Spacewatch	·	2.0 km	MPC · JPL
644214	2006 UG_{57}	—	October 18, 2006	Kitt Peak	Spacewatch	·	540 m	MPC · JPL
644215	2006 UB_{58}	—	September 30, 2006	Mount Lemmon	Mount Lemmon Survey	·	1.0 km	MPC · JPL
644216	2006 UG_{60}	—	September 26, 2006	Kitt Peak	Spacewatch	·	2.2 km	MPC · JPL
644217	2006 UP_{60}	—	October 19, 2006	Kitt Peak	Spacewatch	THM	1.6 km	MPC · JPL
644218	2006 UP_{62}	—	October 19, 2006	Kanab	Sherdian, E.	·	2.6 km	MPC · JPL
644219	2006 UY_{63}	—	September 25, 2006	Kitt Peak	Spacewatch	·	780 m	MPC · JPL
644220	2006 UT_{71}	—	October 17, 2006	Kitt Peak	Spacewatch	EUN	920 m	MPC · JPL
644221	2006 UA_{72}	—	October 17, 2006	Kitt Peak	Spacewatch	·	2.3 km	MPC · JPL
644222	2006 UA_{73}	—	October 17, 2006	Kitt Peak	Spacewatch	·	2.2 km	MPC · JPL
644223	2006 UP_{73}	—	October 3, 2006	Kitt Peak	Spacewatch	EUN	1.2 km	MPC · JPL
644224	2006 UL_{74}	—	October 17, 2006	Kitt Peak	Spacewatch	(31811)	2.3 km	MPC · JPL
644225	2006 UZ_{74}	—	September 26, 2006	Kitt Peak	Spacewatch	·	2.3 km	MPC · JPL
644226	2006 UR_{83}	—	October 12, 2006	Palomar	NEAT	T_{j} (2.96)	4.1 km	MPC · JPL
644227	2006 UB_{95}	—	October 18, 2006	Kitt Peak	Spacewatch	·	2.6 km	MPC · JPL
644228	2006 UE_{95}	—	October 2, 2006	Mount Lemmon	Mount Lemmon Survey	LIX	2.3 km	MPC · JPL
644229	2006 UU_{101}	—	October 18, 2006	Kitt Peak	Spacewatch	·	1.7 km	MPC · JPL
644230	2006 UM_{102}	—	October 3, 2006	Mount Lemmon	Mount Lemmon Survey	·	2.2 km	MPC · JPL
644231	2006 UP_{102}	—	October 18, 2006	Kitt Peak	Spacewatch	·	1.9 km	MPC · JPL
644232	2006 UY_{102}	—	October 3, 2006	Mount Lemmon	Mount Lemmon Survey	LIX	2.5 km	MPC · JPL
644233	2006 UL_{103}	—	October 18, 2006	Kitt Peak	Spacewatch	·	1.1 km	MPC · JPL
644234	2006 UR_{103}	—	October 18, 2006	Kitt Peak	Spacewatch	LIX	2.4 km	MPC · JPL
644235	2006 UJ_{105}	—	October 18, 2006	Kitt Peak	Spacewatch	·	2.4 km	MPC · JPL
644236	2006 UQ_{105}	—	November 15, 1995	Kitt Peak	Spacewatch	·	2.1 km	MPC · JPL
644237	2006 UM_{107}	—	October 3, 2006	Mount Lemmon	Mount Lemmon Survey	·	1.2 km	MPC · JPL
644238	2006 UP_{109}	—	August 25, 2006	Lulin	LUSS	·	2.3 km	MPC · JPL
644239	2006 UO_{111}	—	October 11, 2006	Kitt Peak	Spacewatch	·	2.0 km	MPC · JPL
644240	2006 UG_{113}	—	October 2, 2006	Kitt Peak	Spacewatch	LUT	2.8 km	MPC · JPL
644241	2006 UT_{113}	—	September 28, 2006	Kitt Peak	Spacewatch	(5)	990 m	MPC · JPL
644242	2006 UB_{114}	—	October 19, 2006	Kitt Peak	Spacewatch	HYG	2.2 km	MPC · JPL
644243	2006 UO_{114}	—	September 27, 2006	Kitt Peak	Spacewatch	·	2.6 km	MPC · JPL
644244	2006 UG_{117}	—	October 3, 2006	Kitt Peak	Spacewatch	MAR	610 m	MPC · JPL
644245	2006 UH_{121}	—	October 19, 2006	Kitt Peak	Spacewatch	·	1.7 km	MPC · JPL
644246	2006 UX_{123}	—	October 19, 2006	Kitt Peak	Spacewatch	·	1.9 km	MPC · JPL
644247	2006 UU_{125}	—	October 19, 2006	Kitt Peak	Spacewatch	·	910 m	MPC · JPL
644248	2006 UY_{130}	—	October 2, 2006	Mount Lemmon	Mount Lemmon Survey	·	2.0 km	MPC · JPL
644249	2006 UX_{134}	—	September 26, 2006	Mount Lemmon	Mount Lemmon Survey	EOS	1.5 km	MPC · JPL
644250	2006 UV_{135}	—	October 19, 2006	Kitt Peak	Spacewatch	·	2.1 km	MPC · JPL
644251	2006 UF_{136}	—	July 4, 2005	Kitt Peak	Spacewatch	·	3.8 km	MPC · JPL
644252	2006 UV_{137}	—	October 19, 2006	Mount Lemmon	Mount Lemmon Survey	·	3.2 km	MPC · JPL
644253	2006 UB_{138}	—	October 19, 2006	Kitt Peak	Spacewatch	KON	1.9 km	MPC · JPL
644254	2006 UR_{138}	—	October 19, 2006	Kitt Peak	Spacewatch	MAR	810 m	MPC · JPL
644255	2006 UK_{140}	—	October 19, 2006	Kitt Peak	Spacewatch	·	2.8 km	MPC · JPL
644256	2006 UT_{144}	—	August 21, 2006	Kitt Peak	Spacewatch	·	2.3 km	MPC · JPL
644257	2006 UP_{145}	—	October 20, 2006	Kitt Peak	Spacewatch	·	2.5 km	MPC · JPL
644258	2006 UB_{146}	—	October 20, 2006	Kitt Peak	Spacewatch	·	1.7 km	MPC · JPL
644259	2006 UK_{146}	—	October 20, 2006	Kitt Peak	Spacewatch	·	1.1 km	MPC · JPL
644260	2006 UK_{148}	—	September 17, 2006	Catalina	CSS	·	1.8 km	MPC · JPL
644261	2006 UK_{149}	—	September 17, 2006	Catalina	CSS	3:2	4.4 km	MPC · JPL
644262	2006 UA_{150}	—	October 11, 2006	Palomar	NEAT	T_{j} (2.95) · 3:2	5.7 km	MPC · JPL
644263	2006 UO_{150}	—	October 20, 2006	Mount Lemmon	Mount Lemmon Survey	·	2.5 km	MPC · JPL
644264	2006 UX_{151}	—	February 22, 2004	Kitt Peak	Spacewatch	(5)	1.3 km	MPC · JPL
644265	2006 UG_{152}	—	September 28, 2006	Mount Lemmon	Mount Lemmon Survey	·	2.6 km	MPC · JPL
644266	2006 UO_{154}	—	October 21, 2006	Mount Lemmon	Mount Lemmon Survey	·	2.0 km	MPC · JPL
644267	2006 UK_{155}	—	September 27, 2006	Kitt Peak	Spacewatch	·	1.9 km	MPC · JPL
644268	2006 UR_{158}	—	October 21, 2006	Mount Lemmon	Mount Lemmon Survey	EOS	1.6 km	MPC · JPL
644269	2006 UW_{161}	—	October 3, 2006	Mount Lemmon	Mount Lemmon Survey	·	2.3 km	MPC · JPL
644270	2006 UA_{162}	—	October 21, 2006	Mount Lemmon	Mount Lemmon Survey	·	2.1 km	MPC · JPL
644271	2006 UD_{164}	—	October 2, 2006	Mount Lemmon	Mount Lemmon Survey	·	1.6 km	MPC · JPL
644272	2006 UB_{165}	—	October 2, 2006	Mount Lemmon	Mount Lemmon Survey	MAR	940 m	MPC · JPL
644273	2006 US_{165}	—	September 27, 2000	Apache Point	SDSS Collaboration	·	2.1 km	MPC · JPL
644274	2006 UJ_{166}	—	October 2, 2006	Mount Lemmon	Mount Lemmon Survey	MAR	560 m	MPC · JPL
644275	2006 UT_{166}	—	October 21, 2006	Mount Lemmon	Mount Lemmon Survey	·	990 m	MPC · JPL
644276	2006 UA_{167}	—	October 2, 2006	Mount Lemmon	Mount Lemmon Survey	3:2	4.1 km	MPC · JPL
644277	2006 UX_{167}	—	October 2, 2006	Mount Lemmon	Mount Lemmon Survey	·	810 m	MPC · JPL
644278	2006 US_{169}	—	September 30, 2006	Catalina	CSS	·	670 m	MPC · JPL
644279	2006 UW_{171}	—	October 21, 2006	Mount Lemmon	Mount Lemmon Survey	TIR	2.4 km	MPC · JPL
644280	2006 UZ_{173}	—	October 19, 2006	Lulin	LUSS	·	2.6 km	MPC · JPL
644281	2006 UL_{178}	—	September 30, 2006	Vail-Jarnac	Jarnac	·	770 m	MPC · JPL
644282	2006 UV_{180}	—	October 12, 2006	Palomar	NEAT	·	550 m	MPC · JPL
644283	2006 UY_{185}	—	September 16, 2006	Catalina	CSS	·	2.9 km	MPC · JPL
644284	2006 UQ_{188}	—	September 28, 2006	Catalina	CSS	THB	2.8 km	MPC · JPL
644285	2006 UH_{194}	—	October 20, 2006	Kitt Peak	Spacewatch	·	2.5 km	MPC · JPL
644286	2006 UK_{194}	—	September 25, 2006	Mount Lemmon	Mount Lemmon Survey	·	2.3 km	MPC · JPL
644287	2006 UK_{201}	—	October 21, 2006	Kitt Peak	Spacewatch	·	2.4 km	MPC · JPL
644288	2006 UN_{201}	—	October 12, 2006	Kitt Peak	Spacewatch	EOS	1.8 km	MPC · JPL
644289	2006 UE_{205}	—	September 18, 2006	Kitt Peak	Spacewatch	·	560 m	MPC · JPL
644290	2006 UC_{206}	—	October 23, 2006	Kitt Peak	Spacewatch	HNS	960 m	MPC · JPL
644291	2006 UG_{209}	—	October 23, 2006	Kitt Peak	Spacewatch	·	2.7 km	MPC · JPL
644292	2006 UW_{209}	—	October 23, 2006	Kitt Peak	Spacewatch	·	900 m	MPC · JPL
644293	2006 UT_{210}	—	October 19, 2006	Catalina	CSS	·	800 m	MPC · JPL
644294	2006 UK_{214}	—	October 23, 2006	Kitt Peak	Spacewatch	·	460 m	MPC · JPL
644295	2006 UG_{215}	—	September 30, 2006	Catalina	CSS	fast	740 m	MPC · JPL
644296	2006 UP_{222}	—	September 23, 2006	Kitt Peak	Spacewatch	·	1.7 km	MPC · JPL
644297	2006 UR_{230}	—	October 21, 2006	Kitt Peak	Spacewatch	·	710 m	MPC · JPL
644298	2006 UJ_{231}	—	October 21, 2006	Mount Lemmon	Mount Lemmon Survey	·	2.1 km	MPC · JPL
644299	2006 UK_{234}	—	October 12, 2006	Kitt Peak	Spacewatch	THM	1.6 km	MPC · JPL
644300	2006 UM_{234}	—	October 1, 2006	Kitt Peak	Spacewatch	EUN	960 m	MPC · JPL

== 644301–644400 ==
back to top

Designation			Discovery			Properties		Ref
Permanent	Provisional	Named after	Date	Site	Discoverer(s)	Category	Diam.	Ref
644301	2006 UA_{239}	—	October 23, 2006	Kitt Peak	Spacewatch	·	2.2 km	MPC · JPL
644302	2006 US_{242}	—	October 19, 2006	Kitt Peak	Spacewatch	·	2.2 km	MPC · JPL
644303	2006 UO_{247}	—	October 27, 2006	Mount Lemmon	Mount Lemmon Survey	EOS	1.4 km	MPC · JPL
644304	2006 UO_{255}	—	October 20, 2006	Kitt Peak	Spacewatch	·	2.3 km	MPC · JPL
644305	2006 UN_{258}	—	October 28, 2006	Mount Lemmon	Mount Lemmon Survey	·	2.4 km	MPC · JPL
644306	2006 UX_{258}	—	October 16, 2006	Kitt Peak	Spacewatch	·	970 m	MPC · JPL
644307	2006 UX_{260}	—	October 28, 2006	Mount Lemmon	Mount Lemmon Survey	·	2.5 km	MPC · JPL
644308	2006 UV_{261}	—	October 28, 2006	Mount Lemmon	Mount Lemmon Survey	·	970 m	MPC · JPL
644309	2006 UT_{262}	—	October 29, 2006	Mount Lemmon	Mount Lemmon Survey	·	2.7 km	MPC · JPL
644310	2006 UF_{263}	—	October 31, 2006	Bergisch Gladbach	W. Bickel	·	490 m	MPC · JPL
644311	2006 UV_{263}	—	September 19, 2006	Kitt Peak	Spacewatch	T_{j} (2.98) · 3:2	3.4 km	MPC · JPL
644312	2006 UE_{264}	—	October 16, 2006	Kitt Peak	Spacewatch	·	2.2 km	MPC · JPL
644313	2006 UK_{267}	—	October 27, 2006	Mount Lemmon	Mount Lemmon Survey	·	2.3 km	MPC · JPL
644314	2006 UQ_{267}	—	October 27, 2006	Mount Lemmon	Mount Lemmon Survey	EOS	1.4 km	MPC · JPL
644315	2006 UR_{268}	—	October 27, 2006	Mount Lemmon	Mount Lemmon Survey	·	1.8 km	MPC · JPL
644316	2006 UH_{271}	—	October 27, 2006	Kitt Peak	Spacewatch	·	2.9 km	MPC · JPL
644317	2006 UO_{271}	—	October 27, 2006	Mount Lemmon	Mount Lemmon Survey	·	2.0 km	MPC · JPL
644318	2006 US_{276}	—	October 21, 2006	Kitt Peak	Spacewatch	HYG	2.1 km	MPC · JPL
644319	2006 UN_{278}	—	October 19, 2006	Kitt Peak	Spacewatch	·	1.4 km	MPC · JPL
644320	2006 UK_{279}	—	October 28, 2006	Mount Lemmon	Mount Lemmon Survey	·	990 m	MPC · JPL
644321	2006 UQ_{281}	—	October 20, 2006	Kitt Peak	Spacewatch	·	820 m	MPC · JPL
644322	2006 UZ_{281}	—	September 25, 2006	Mount Lemmon	Mount Lemmon Survey	·	950 m	MPC · JPL
644323	2006 UH_{287}	—	September 14, 2006	Kitt Peak	Spacewatch	·	1.9 km	MPC · JPL
644324	2006 UL_{289}	—	September 25, 2006	Mount Lemmon	Mount Lemmon Survey	·	1.7 km	MPC · JPL
644325	2006 UO_{289}	—	October 31, 2006	Mount Lemmon	Mount Lemmon Survey	·	2.3 km	MPC · JPL
644326	2006 UF_{290}	—	October 21, 2006	Kitt Peak	Spacewatch	·	650 m	MPC · JPL
644327	2006 UN_{292}	—	December 14, 2017	Mount Lemmon	Mount Lemmon Survey	EOS	1.6 km	MPC · JPL
644328	2006 UY_{295}	—	October 19, 2006	Kitt Peak	Deep Ecliptic Survey	·	710 m	MPC · JPL
644329	2006 UG_{299}	—	August 28, 2006	Kitt Peak	Spacewatch	EOS	1.3 km	MPC · JPL
644330	2006 UQ_{300}	—	October 19, 2006	Kitt Peak	Deep Ecliptic Survey	·	640 m	MPC · JPL
644331	2006 UL_{302}	—	October 19, 2006	Kitt Peak	Deep Ecliptic Survey	·	2.0 km	MPC · JPL
644332	2006 UN_{303}	—	September 30, 2006	Mount Lemmon	Mount Lemmon Survey	·	810 m	MPC · JPL
644333	2006 UX_{316}	—	October 22, 2006	Mount Lemmon	Mount Lemmon Survey	LIX	3.6 km	MPC · JPL
644334	2006 UB_{321}	—	October 31, 2006	Mount Lemmon	Mount Lemmon Survey	·	1.3 km	MPC · JPL
644335	2006 US_{322}	—	October 16, 2006	Kitt Peak	Spacewatch	·	2.5 km	MPC · JPL
644336	2006 UX_{322}	—	August 29, 2006	Kitt Peak	Spacewatch	BRG	1.3 km	MPC · JPL
644337	2006 UD_{331}	—	October 16, 2006	Apache Point	SDSS Collaboration	·	1.9 km	MPC · JPL
644338	2006 UY_{331}	—	October 21, 2006	Apache Point	SDSS Collaboration	·	1.0 km	MPC · JPL
644339	2006 UU_{332}	—	October 21, 2006	Apache Point	SDSS Collaboration	·	2.3 km	MPC · JPL
644340	2006 UX_{332}	—	October 17, 2006	Apache Point	SDSS Collaboration	·	2.5 km	MPC · JPL
644341	2006 UJ_{333}	—	October 17, 2006	Apache Point	SDSS Collaboration	(1547)	1.2 km	MPC · JPL
644342	2006 UU_{333}	—	October 22, 2006	Apache Point	SDSS Collaboration	·	2.4 km	MPC · JPL
644343	2006 UV_{336}	—	October 21, 2006	Kitt Peak	Spacewatch	·	1.7 km	MPC · JPL
644344	2006 UY_{337}	—	October 22, 2006	Kitt Peak	Spacewatch	EOS	1.6 km	MPC · JPL
644345	2006 UV_{339}	—	November 15, 2006	Mount Lemmon	Mount Lemmon Survey	·	2.3 km	MPC · JPL
644346	2006 UC_{354}	—	November 11, 2006	Mount Lemmon	Mount Lemmon Survey	·	2.0 km	MPC · JPL
644347	2006 UP_{355}	—	October 26, 2006	Mauna Kea	P. A. Wiegert	·	990 m	MPC · JPL
644348	2006 UM_{358}	—	October 16, 2006	Kitt Peak	Spacewatch	·	2.3 km	MPC · JPL
644349	2006 UR_{358}	—	April 15, 2005	Kitt Peak	Spacewatch	·	730 m	MPC · JPL
644350	2006 UL_{359}	—	October 21, 2006	Kitt Peak	Spacewatch	(43176)	2.1 km	MPC · JPL
644351	2006 UD_{360}	—	October 23, 2006	Kitt Peak	Spacewatch	·	920 m	MPC · JPL
644352	2006 UN_{360}	—	October 31, 2006	Mount Lemmon	Mount Lemmon Survey	·	2.5 km	MPC · JPL
644353	2006 UG_{361}	—	October 19, 2006	Catalina	CSS	·	760 m	MPC · JPL
644354	2006 UV_{362}	—	September 30, 2006	Mount Lemmon	Mount Lemmon Survey	3:2	4.3 km	MPC · JPL
644355	2006 UY_{362}	—	October 22, 2006	Mount Lemmon	Mount Lemmon Survey	·	2.4 km	MPC · JPL
644356	2006 UA_{363}	—	October 12, 2006	Kitt Peak	Spacewatch	·	1.6 km	MPC · JPL
644357	2006 UG_{363}	—	October 19, 2006	Kitt Peak	Spacewatch	·	910 m	MPC · JPL
644358	2006 UT_{363}	—	October 19, 2006	Catalina	CSS	EUP	3.2 km	MPC · JPL
644359	2006 UA_{364}	—	October 13, 2006	Kitt Peak	Spacewatch	·	850 m	MPC · JPL
644360	2006 UB_{364}	—	August 5, 2005	Palomar	NEAT	T_{j} (2.99) · 3:2	4.7 km	MPC · JPL
644361	2006 UN_{364}	—	July 3, 2005	Mount Lemmon	Mount Lemmon Survey	·	2.2 km	MPC · JPL
644362	2006 UB_{365}	—	October 23, 2006	Mount Lemmon	Mount Lemmon Survey	·	2.2 km	MPC · JPL
644363	2006 UO_{365}	—	October 17, 2006	Catalina	CSS	·	2.8 km	MPC · JPL
644364	2006 UT_{365}	—	October 31, 2006	Mount Lemmon	Mount Lemmon Survey	(7605)	2.8 km	MPC · JPL
644365	2006 UE_{366}	—	November 18, 2006	Mount Lemmon	Mount Lemmon Survey	·	850 m	MPC · JPL
644366	2006 UG_{366}	—	October 21, 2006	Mount Lemmon	Mount Lemmon Survey	·	2.2 km	MPC · JPL
644367	2006 UM_{366}	—	July 5, 2016	Mount Lemmon	Mount Lemmon Survey	EOS	1.5 km	MPC · JPL
644368	2006 UT_{366}	—	August 2, 2016	Haleakala	Pan-STARRS 1	·	2.3 km	MPC · JPL
644369	2006 UW_{366}	—	April 4, 2014	Haleakala	Pan-STARRS 1	·	2.3 km	MPC · JPL
644370	2006 UP_{367}	—	October 21, 2006	Kitt Peak	Spacewatch	·	2.6 km	MPC · JPL
644371	2006 UQ_{367}	—	July 13, 2016	Haleakala	Pan-STARRS 1	·	2.5 km	MPC · JPL
644372	2006 UU_{367}	—	October 19, 2006	Kitt Peak	Spacewatch	·	1.8 km	MPC · JPL
644373	2006 UW_{367}	—	October 23, 2006	Kitt Peak	Spacewatch	·	560 m	MPC · JPL
644374	2006 UB_{368}	—	October 21, 2006	Kitt Peak	Spacewatch	THM	1.5 km	MPC · JPL
644375	2006 UJ_{368}	—	April 22, 2014	Mount Lemmon	Mount Lemmon Survey	·	2.3 km	MPC · JPL
644376	2006 UL_{368}	—	October 21, 2006	Kitt Peak	Spacewatch	·	1.8 km	MPC · JPL
644377	2006 UM_{368}	—	October 17, 2010	Mount Lemmon	Mount Lemmon Survey	EUN	950 m	MPC · JPL
644378	2006 UQ_{368}	—	October 20, 2006	Kitt Peak	Spacewatch	THM	1.8 km	MPC · JPL
644379	2006 UU_{368}	—	December 2, 2012	Mount Lemmon	Mount Lemmon Survey	HYG	1.9 km	MPC · JPL
644380	2006 UX_{368}	—	October 17, 2006	Kitt Peak	Spacewatch	·	2.8 km	MPC · JPL
644381	2006 UA_{369}	—	October 1, 2006	Kitt Peak	Spacewatch	·	2.0 km	MPC · JPL
644382	2006 UR_{369}	—	March 12, 2016	Haleakala	Pan-STARRS 1	V	570 m	MPC · JPL
644383	2006 UY_{369}	—	October 16, 2006	Kitt Peak	Spacewatch	·	850 m	MPC · JPL
644384	2006 UZ_{369}	—	October 13, 2006	Kitt Peak	Spacewatch	·	2.1 km	MPC · JPL
644385	2006 UB_{370}	—	May 11, 2015	Mount Lemmon	Mount Lemmon Survey	·	2.8 km	MPC · JPL
644386	2006 UF_{370}	—	October 16, 2006	Kitt Peak	Spacewatch	·	2.1 km	MPC · JPL
644387	2006 UP_{370}	—	October 27, 2006	Kitt Peak	Spacewatch	·	2.3 km	MPC · JPL
644388	2006 UV_{372}	—	October 23, 2006	Mount Lemmon	Mount Lemmon Survey	·	630 m	MPC · JPL
644389	2006 UW_{372}	—	September 17, 2006	Catalina	CSS	·	2.4 km	MPC · JPL
644390	2006 UG_{373}	—	January 21, 2014	Mount Lemmon	Mount Lemmon Survey	·	480 m	MPC · JPL
644391	2006 UL_{373}	—	October 8, 2016	Haleakala	Pan-STARRS 1	·	600 m	MPC · JPL
644392	2006 UW_{373}	—	October 31, 2006	Mount Lemmon	Mount Lemmon Survey	·	910 m	MPC · JPL
644393	2006 UW_{374}	—	September 25, 2016	Haleakala	Pan-STARRS 1	·	610 m	MPC · JPL
644394	2006 UB_{375}	—	November 4, 2012	Kitt Peak	Spacewatch	·	2.1 km	MPC · JPL
644395	2006 UD_{375}	—	October 29, 2006	Mount Lemmon	Mount Lemmon Survey	·	2.0 km	MPC · JPL
644396	2006 UM_{375}	—	April 16, 2013	Haleakala	Pan-STARRS 1	·	1.3 km	MPC · JPL
644397	2006 UY_{375}	—	October 21, 2006	Kitt Peak	Spacewatch	·	2.2 km	MPC · JPL
644398	2006 UG_{376}	—	March 29, 2008	Mount Lemmon	Mount Lemmon Survey	·	1.1 km	MPC · JPL
644399	2006 UH_{376}	—	March 18, 2009	Mount Lemmon	Mount Lemmon Survey	·	2.9 km	MPC · JPL
644400	2006 UO_{376}	—	October 21, 2006	Kitt Peak	Spacewatch	·	2.5 km	MPC · JPL

== 644401–644500 ==
back to top

Designation			Discovery			Properties		Ref
Permanent	Provisional	Named after	Date	Site	Discoverer(s)	Category	Diam.	Ref
644401	2006 UR_{376}	—	April 26, 2017	Haleakala	Pan-STARRS 1	·	1.1 km	MPC · JPL
644402	2006 UE_{377}	—	August 15, 2009	Kitt Peak	Spacewatch	·	400 m	MPC · JPL
644403	2006 UY_{377}	—	February 26, 2014	Mount Lemmon	Mount Lemmon Survey	VER	1.9 km	MPC · JPL
644404	2006 UJ_{378}	—	August 15, 2017	Haleakala	Pan-STARRS 1	LIX	2.7 km	MPC · JPL
644405	2006 UF_{379}	—	October 20, 2006	Mount Lemmon	Mount Lemmon Survey	·	2.3 km	MPC · JPL
644406	2006 UJ_{379}	—	October 19, 2006	Mount Lemmon	Mount Lemmon Survey	·	2.5 km	MPC · JPL
644407	2006 UK_{379}	—	September 16, 2006	Catalina	CSS	(194)	1.5 km	MPC · JPL
644408	2006 UG_{380}	—	November 28, 2016	Haleakala	Pan-STARRS 1	·	590 m	MPC · JPL
644409	2006 UJ_{380}	—	March 24, 2015	Mount Lemmon	Mount Lemmon Survey	·	2.4 km	MPC · JPL
644410	2006 UX_{381}	—	October 22, 2006	Mount Lemmon	Mount Lemmon Survey	·	570 m	MPC · JPL
644411	2006 UC_{383}	—	October 22, 2006	Kitt Peak	Spacewatch	·	460 m	MPC · JPL
644412	2006 UD_{383}	—	October 19, 2006	Kitt Peak	Spacewatch	·	2.1 km	MPC · JPL
644413	2006 UF_{383}	—	October 22, 2006	Kitt Peak	Spacewatch	EOS	1.6 km	MPC · JPL
644414	2006 UH_{383}	—	May 21, 2015	Haleakala	Pan-STARRS 1	·	2.3 km	MPC · JPL
644415	2006 UN_{383}	—	October 21, 2006	Mount Lemmon	Mount Lemmon Survey	EOS	1.4 km	MPC · JPL
644416	2006 UR_{384}	—	November 13, 2006	Mount Lemmon	Mount Lemmon Survey	·	550 m	MPC · JPL
644417	2006 UZ_{384}	—	October 18, 2006	Kitt Peak	Spacewatch	VER	2.2 km	MPC · JPL
644418	2006 UZ_{388}	—	October 17, 2006	Kitt Peak	Spacewatch	·	2.7 km	MPC · JPL
644419	2006 UD_{389}	—	October 20, 2006	Mount Lemmon	Mount Lemmon Survey	·	1.9 km	MPC · JPL
644420	2006 UL_{389}	—	October 19, 2006	Kitt Peak	Spacewatch	·	1.8 km	MPC · JPL
644421	2006 UO_{389}	—	October 20, 2006	Mount Lemmon	Mount Lemmon Survey	VER	2.7 km	MPC · JPL
644422	2006 UP_{389}	—	October 21, 2006	Kitt Peak	Spacewatch	·	1.6 km	MPC · JPL
644423	2006 UT_{389}	—	October 19, 2006	Mount Lemmon	Mount Lemmon Survey	·	2.7 km	MPC · JPL
644424	2006 UP_{390}	—	October 19, 2006	Kitt Peak	Spacewatch	·	1.8 km	MPC · JPL
644425	2006 UR_{392}	—	October 16, 2006	Catalina	CSS	T_{j} (2.98)	2.3 km	MPC · JPL
644426	2006 UZ_{392}	—	October 19, 2006	Mount Lemmon	Mount Lemmon Survey	EMA	2.6 km	MPC · JPL
644427	2006 UW_{393}	—	October 19, 2006	Mount Lemmon	Mount Lemmon Survey	VER	2.1 km	MPC · JPL
644428	2006 UP_{394}	—	October 23, 2006	Kitt Peak	Spacewatch	·	2.4 km	MPC · JPL
644429	2006 UQ_{394}	—	October 21, 2006	Kitt Peak	Spacewatch	·	2.0 km	MPC · JPL
644430	2006 UZ_{394}	—	September 27, 2006	Mount Lemmon	Mount Lemmon Survey	·	2.1 km	MPC · JPL
644431	2006 UD_{395}	—	October 21, 2006	Mount Lemmon	Mount Lemmon Survey	EOS	1.6 km	MPC · JPL
644432	2006 UN_{395}	—	October 20, 2006	Mount Lemmon	Mount Lemmon Survey	LIX	2.6 km	MPC · JPL
644433	2006 VN	—	October 21, 2006	Kitt Peak	Spacewatch	EOS	1.4 km	MPC · JPL
644434	2006 VY	—	November 1, 2006	Mount Lemmon	Mount Lemmon Survey	·	2.0 km	MPC · JPL
644435	2006 VP_{5}	—	October 21, 2006	Kitt Peak	Spacewatch	·	2.5 km	MPC · JPL
644436	2006 VD_{8}	—	November 1, 2006	Mount Lemmon	Mount Lemmon Survey	·	1.2 km	MPC · JPL
644437	2006 VV_{8}	—	October 21, 2006	Mount Lemmon	Mount Lemmon Survey	·	2.9 km	MPC · JPL
644438	2006 VT_{14}	—	October 19, 2006	Mount Lemmon	Mount Lemmon Survey	·	570 m	MPC · JPL
644439	2006 VG_{19}	—	October 23, 2006	Kitt Peak	Spacewatch	MAR	970 m	MPC · JPL
644440	2006 VM_{21}	—	October 16, 2006	Kitt Peak	Spacewatch	·	2.5 km	MPC · JPL
644441	2006 VS_{23}	—	November 10, 2006	Kitt Peak	Spacewatch	THM	1.9 km	MPC · JPL
644442	2006 VZ_{23}	—	November 10, 2006	Kitt Peak	Spacewatch	VER	2.0 km	MPC · JPL
644443	2006 VU_{24}	—	November 10, 2006	Kitt Peak	Spacewatch	·	2.1 km	MPC · JPL
644444	2006 VG_{25}	—	October 4, 2006	Mount Lemmon	Mount Lemmon Survey	·	1.3 km	MPC · JPL
644445	2006 VY_{30}	—	September 27, 2006	Mount Lemmon	Mount Lemmon Survey	·	2.7 km	MPC · JPL
644446	2006 VJ_{32}	—	October 2, 2006	Mount Lemmon	Mount Lemmon Survey	·	2.3 km	MPC · JPL
644447	2006 VN_{36}	—	October 22, 2006	Mount Lemmon	Mount Lemmon Survey	·	1.4 km	MPC · JPL
644448	2006 VO_{38}	—	November 12, 2006	Mount Lemmon	Mount Lemmon Survey	EOS	1.4 km	MPC · JPL
644449	2006 VL_{42}	—	October 22, 2006	Kitt Peak	Spacewatch	THM	1.8 km	MPC · JPL
644450	2006 VV_{46}	—	October 31, 2006	Mount Lemmon	Mount Lemmon Survey	VER	2.0 km	MPC · JPL
644451	2006 VM_{48}	—	October 11, 2006	Palomar	NEAT	·	3.0 km	MPC · JPL
644452	2006 VS_{52}	—	November 11, 2006	Kitt Peak	Spacewatch	·	860 m	MPC · JPL
644453	2006 VU_{55}	—	October 23, 2006	Mount Lemmon	Mount Lemmon Survey	THM	1.7 km	MPC · JPL
644454	2006 VW_{56}	—	October 31, 2006	Mount Lemmon	Mount Lemmon Survey	·	570 m	MPC · JPL
644455	2006 VN_{61}	—	November 11, 2006	Mount Lemmon	Mount Lemmon Survey	·	890 m	MPC · JPL
644456	2006 VX_{62}	—	November 11, 2006	Kitt Peak	Spacewatch	·	3.2 km	MPC · JPL
644457	2006 VD_{67}	—	November 11, 2006	Kitt Peak	Spacewatch	·	840 m	MPC · JPL
644458	2006 VF_{68}	—	November 11, 2006	Kitt Peak	Spacewatch	·	2.0 km	MPC · JPL
644459	2006 VK_{71}	—	October 19, 2006	Mount Lemmon	Mount Lemmon Survey	·	1.7 km	MPC · JPL
644460	2006 VR_{72}	—	October 31, 2006	Mount Lemmon	Mount Lemmon Survey	ELF	3.3 km	MPC · JPL
644461	2006 VT_{72}	—	November 11, 2006	Mount Lemmon	Mount Lemmon Survey	·	2.1 km	MPC · JPL
644462	2006 VK_{81}	—	October 11, 2006	Palomar	NEAT	T_{j} (2.96)	3.1 km	MPC · JPL
644463	2006 VU_{81}	—	November 13, 2006	Kitt Peak	Spacewatch	·	2.9 km	MPC · JPL
644464	2006 VN_{83}	—	October 31, 2006	Mount Lemmon	Mount Lemmon Survey	·	2.5 km	MPC · JPL
644465	2006 VX_{83}	—	October 30, 2006	Altschwendt	W. Ries	·	1.4 km	MPC · JPL
644466	2006 VG_{84}	—	November 13, 2006	Mount Lemmon	Mount Lemmon Survey	·	2.0 km	MPC · JPL
644467	2006 VJ_{84}	—	November 13, 2006	Mount Lemmon	Mount Lemmon Survey	·	420 m	MPC · JPL
644468	2006 VA_{86}	—	October 12, 2006	Kitt Peak	Spacewatch	THM	2.1 km	MPC · JPL
644469	2006 VG_{90}	—	November 14, 2006	Mount Lemmon	Mount Lemmon Survey	·	2.9 km	MPC · JPL
644470	2006 VV_{90}	—	November 14, 2006	Mount Lemmon	Mount Lemmon Survey	·	3.0 km	MPC · JPL
644471	2006 VH_{93}	—	November 15, 2006	Mount Lemmon	Mount Lemmon Survey	·	2.7 km	MPC · JPL
644472	2006 VQ_{93}	—	October 19, 2006	Mount Lemmon	Mount Lemmon Survey	·	1.5 km	MPC · JPL
644473	2006 VH_{97}	—	November 11, 2006	Mount Lemmon	Mount Lemmon Survey	EUN	940 m	MPC · JPL
644474	2006 VA_{98}	—	November 11, 2006	Kitt Peak	Spacewatch	·	2.2 km	MPC · JPL
644475	2006 VP_{101}	—	November 11, 2006	Kitt Peak	Spacewatch	EUN	960 m	MPC · JPL
644476	2006 VA_{102}	—	November 12, 2006	Mount Lemmon	Mount Lemmon Survey	EOS	1.2 km	MPC · JPL
644477	2006 VT_{103}	—	November 12, 2006	Lulin	LUSS	·	2.8 km	MPC · JPL
644478	2006 VY_{104}	—	October 23, 2006	Kitt Peak	Spacewatch	ADE	1.6 km	MPC · JPL
644479	2006 VO_{107}	—	November 13, 2006	Kitt Peak	Spacewatch	·	1.9 km	MPC · JPL
644480	2006 VP_{111}	—	October 20, 2006	Mount Lemmon	Mount Lemmon Survey	·	2.5 km	MPC · JPL
644481	2006 VD_{112}	—	November 13, 2006	Catalina	CSS	·	2.6 km	MPC · JPL
644482	2006 VX_{114}	—	November 1, 2006	Mount Lemmon	Mount Lemmon Survey	·	2.0 km	MPC · JPL
644483	2006 VZ_{114}	—	October 13, 2006	Kitt Peak	Spacewatch	·	890 m	MPC · JPL
644484	2006 VA_{117}	—	November 14, 2006	Kitt Peak	Spacewatch	·	2.4 km	MPC · JPL
644485	2006 VM_{120}	—	November 14, 2006	Kitt Peak	Spacewatch	THM	1.8 km	MPC · JPL
644486	2006 VG_{122}	—	November 14, 2006	Kitt Peak	Spacewatch	·	2.1 km	MPC · JPL
644487	2006 VL_{122}	—	November 14, 2006	Kitt Peak	Spacewatch	VER	2.1 km	MPC · JPL
644488	2006 VA_{123}	—	November 14, 2006	Kitt Peak	Spacewatch	·	1.9 km	MPC · JPL
644489	2006 VE_{124}	—	November 14, 2006	Kitt Peak	Spacewatch	·	2.3 km	MPC · JPL
644490	2006 VH_{124}	—	November 14, 2006	Kitt Peak	Spacewatch	VER	2.4 km	MPC · JPL
644491	2006 VK_{124}	—	November 14, 2006	Kitt Peak	Spacewatch	(5)	1.0 km	MPC · JPL
644492	2006 VG_{126}	—	October 20, 2006	Mount Lemmon	Mount Lemmon Survey	·	1.1 km	MPC · JPL
644493	2006 VD_{127}	—	November 15, 2006	Kitt Peak	Spacewatch	·	2.2 km	MPC · JPL
644494	2006 VM_{127}	—	November 15, 2006	Kitt Peak	Spacewatch	·	1.9 km	MPC · JPL
644495	2006 VR_{128}	—	November 11, 2006	Kitt Peak	Spacewatch	·	490 m	MPC · JPL
644496	2006 VY_{129}	—	November 15, 2006	Kitt Peak	Spacewatch	·	2.3 km	MPC · JPL
644497	2006 VG_{133}	—	November 11, 2006	Mount Lemmon	Mount Lemmon Survey	·	3.0 km	MPC · JPL
644498	2006 VJ_{135}	—	September 28, 2006	Mount Lemmon	Mount Lemmon Survey	·	1.3 km	MPC · JPL
644499	2006 VB_{138}	—	November 15, 2006	Kitt Peak	Spacewatch	THM	1.9 km	MPC · JPL
644500	2006 VY_{138}	—	November 15, 2006	Kitt Peak	Spacewatch	·	2.3 km	MPC · JPL

== 644501–644600 ==
back to top

Designation			Discovery			Properties		Ref
Permanent	Provisional	Named after	Date	Site	Discoverer(s)	Category	Diam.	Ref
644501	2006 VN_{141}	—	October 23, 2006	Kitt Peak	Spacewatch	·	1.2 km	MPC · JPL
644502	2006 VO_{142}	—	October 19, 2006	Mount Lemmon	Mount Lemmon Survey	·	2.2 km	MPC · JPL
644503	2006 VD_{144}	—	November 15, 2006	Kitt Peak	Spacewatch	·	800 m	MPC · JPL
644504	2006 VH_{144}	—	November 15, 2006	Kitt Peak	Spacewatch	·	1.0 km	MPC · JPL
644505	2006 VR_{155}	—	November 15, 2006	Catalina	CSS	·	3.4 km	MPC · JPL
644506	2006 VC_{173}	—	November 9, 2006	Kitt Peak	Spacewatch	·	1.9 km	MPC · JPL
644507	2006 VQ_{173}	—	November 13, 2006	Kitt Peak	Spacewatch	EUN	960 m	MPC · JPL
644508	2006 VW_{174}	—	September 27, 2006	Mount Lemmon	Mount Lemmon Survey	·	2.6 km	MPC · JPL
644509	2006 VY_{174}	—	November 1, 2006	Mount Lemmon	Mount Lemmon Survey	·	560 m	MPC · JPL
644510	2006 VV_{176}	—	October 13, 2010	Mount Lemmon	Mount Lemmon Survey	·	1.2 km	MPC · JPL
644511	2006 VW_{176}	—	August 1, 2016	Haleakala	Pan-STARRS 1	·	2.5 km	MPC · JPL
644512	2006 VZ_{176}	—	November 2, 2006	Mount Lemmon	Mount Lemmon Survey	·	2.3 km	MPC · JPL
644513	2006 VF_{177}	—	March 23, 2012	Kitt Peak	Spacewatch	·	570 m	MPC · JPL
644514	2006 VH_{177}	—	November 10, 2006	Kitt Peak	Spacewatch	·	590 m	MPC · JPL
644515	2006 VJ_{177}	—	March 25, 2015	Haleakala	Pan-STARRS 1	·	2.8 km	MPC · JPL
644516	2006 VK_{177}	—	March 28, 2008	Mount Lemmon	Mount Lemmon Survey	·	1.7 km	MPC · JPL
644517	2006 VO_{177}	—	December 13, 2012	Mount Lemmon	Mount Lemmon Survey	URS	2.8 km	MPC · JPL
644518	2006 VY_{177}	—	September 15, 2009	Mount Lemmon	Mount Lemmon Survey	·	510 m	MPC · JPL
644519	2006 VB_{178}	—	April 28, 2014	Cerro Tololo	DECam	·	2.3 km	MPC · JPL
644520	2006 VC_{178}	—	October 13, 2017	Mount Lemmon	Mount Lemmon Survey	·	2.1 km	MPC · JPL
644521	2006 VK_{178}	—	November 1, 2006	Kitt Peak	Spacewatch	VER	1.9 km	MPC · JPL
644522	2006 VJ_{179}	—	November 11, 2006	Kitt Peak	Spacewatch	·	2.4 km	MPC · JPL
644523	2006 VU_{179}	—	September 30, 2017	Mount Lemmon	Mount Lemmon Survey	URS	2.5 km	MPC · JPL
644524	2006 VA_{180}	—	November 15, 2006	Mount Lemmon	Mount Lemmon Survey	·	2.4 km	MPC · JPL
644525	2006 VM_{180}	—	November 15, 2006	Kitt Peak	Spacewatch	·	2.4 km	MPC · JPL
644526	2006 VJ_{181}	—	April 14, 2008	Catalina	CSS	·	1.4 km	MPC · JPL
644527	2006 VD_{182}	—	October 22, 2012	Haleakala	Pan-STARRS 1	EUP	2.9 km	MPC · JPL
644528	2006 VL_{182}	—	November 1, 2006	Catalina	CSS	·	2.3 km	MPC · JPL
644529	2006 VS_{182}	—	November 2, 2006	Mount Lemmon	Mount Lemmon Survey	(5)	1.1 km	MPC · JPL
644530	2006 VU_{182}	—	November 1, 2006	Mount Lemmon	Mount Lemmon Survey	·	1.8 km	MPC · JPL
644531	2006 VP_{183}	—	November 1, 2006	Kitt Peak	Spacewatch	·	1.9 km	MPC · JPL
644532	2006 VW_{184}	—	October 10, 2002	Palomar	NEAT	·	1.2 km	MPC · JPL
644533	2006 VZ_{184}	—	November 1, 2006	Kitt Peak	Spacewatch	·	510 m	MPC · JPL
644534	2006 VS_{185}	—	November 14, 2006	Kitt Peak	Spacewatch	·	2.1 km	MPC · JPL
644535	2006 VX_{185}	—	November 1, 2006	Kitt Peak	Spacewatch	EOS	1.4 km	MPC · JPL
644536	2006 VG_{187}	—	November 12, 2006	Mount Lemmon	Mount Lemmon Survey	·	2.2 km	MPC · JPL
644537	2006 VQ_{187}	—	November 15, 2006	Kitt Peak	Spacewatch	·	2.6 km	MPC · JPL
644538	2006 WZ_{1}	—	November 16, 2006	Mount Lemmon	Mount Lemmon Survey	·	2.9 km	MPC · JPL
644539	2006 WP_{2}	—	October 18, 2006	Kitt Peak	Spacewatch	THM	1.9 km	MPC · JPL
644540	2006 WO_{5}	—	October 23, 2006	Mount Lemmon	Mount Lemmon Survey	·	2.3 km	MPC · JPL
644541	2006 WJ_{7}	—	November 16, 2006	Kitt Peak	Spacewatch	JUN	910 m	MPC · JPL
644542	2006 WN_{7}	—	November 16, 2006	Kitt Peak	Spacewatch	·	1.5 km	MPC · JPL
644543	2006 WP_{7}	—	November 16, 2006	Kitt Peak	Spacewatch	(5)	830 m	MPC · JPL
644544	2006 WG_{8}	—	November 16, 2006	Mount Lemmon	Mount Lemmon Survey	·	2.2 km	MPC · JPL
644545	2006 WH_{8}	—	October 22, 2006	Kitt Peak	Spacewatch	·	560 m	MPC · JPL
644546	2006 WH_{9}	—	November 16, 2006	Kitt Peak	Spacewatch	·	2.7 km	MPC · JPL
644547	2006 WW_{12}	—	July 26, 2001	Palomar	NEAT	·	1.4 km	MPC · JPL
644548	2006 WO_{13}	—	November 16, 2006	Mount Lemmon	Mount Lemmon Survey	·	580 m	MPC · JPL
644549	2006 WY_{13}	—	November 16, 2006	Mount Lemmon	Mount Lemmon Survey	·	3.0 km	MPC · JPL
644550	2006 WP_{14}	—	November 16, 2006	Mount Lemmon	Mount Lemmon Survey	·	2.8 km	MPC · JPL
644551	2006 WX_{14}	—	November 16, 2006	Mount Lemmon	Mount Lemmon Survey	·	840 m	MPC · JPL
644552	2006 WW_{15}	—	October 4, 2006	Mount Lemmon	Mount Lemmon Survey	EOS	1.4 km	MPC · JPL
644553	2006 WA_{16}	—	November 17, 2006	Kitt Peak	Spacewatch	(5)	830 m	MPC · JPL
644554	2006 WW_{16}	—	November 15, 1998	Kitt Peak	Spacewatch	·	1.2 km	MPC · JPL
644555	2006 WH_{18}	—	November 1, 2006	Mount Lemmon	Mount Lemmon Survey	·	1.7 km	MPC · JPL
644556	2006 WK_{18}	—	October 2, 2006	Mount Lemmon	Mount Lemmon Survey	·	840 m	MPC · JPL
644557	2006 WT_{18}	—	October 20, 2006	Palomar	NEAT	·	1.4 km	MPC · JPL
644558	2006 WA_{19}	—	October 22, 2006	Kitt Peak	Spacewatch	·	1.1 km	MPC · JPL
644559	2006 WE_{19}	—	November 10, 2006	Kitt Peak	Spacewatch	HNS	970 m	MPC · JPL
644560	2006 WM_{20}	—	November 17, 2006	Catalina	CSS	·	2.3 km	MPC · JPL
644561	2006 WH_{22}	—	February 26, 2004	Kitt Peak	Deep Ecliptic Survey	·	1.3 km	MPC · JPL
644562	2006 WP_{24}	—	November 17, 2006	Mount Lemmon	Mount Lemmon Survey	·	2.2 km	MPC · JPL
644563	2006 WK_{26}	—	November 18, 2006	Vail-Jarnac	Jarnac	·	670 m	MPC · JPL
644564	2006 WT_{31}	—	November 16, 2006	Kitt Peak	Spacewatch	·	1.2 km	MPC · JPL
644565	2006 WV_{35}	—	October 23, 2006	Mount Lemmon	Mount Lemmon Survey	·	2.4 km	MPC · JPL
644566	2006 WJ_{38}	—	November 16, 2006	Kitt Peak	Spacewatch	JUN	890 m	MPC · JPL
644567	2006 WC_{39}	—	November 16, 2006	Kitt Peak	Spacewatch	EOS	1.4 km	MPC · JPL
644568	2006 WF_{40}	—	November 16, 2006	Kitt Peak	Spacewatch	·	2.8 km	MPC · JPL
644569	2006 WP_{40}	—	October 1, 2000	Socorro	LINEAR	·	3.2 km	MPC · JPL
644570	2006 WU_{42}	—	November 16, 2006	Kitt Peak	Spacewatch	EOS	1.9 km	MPC · JPL
644571	2006 WJ_{43}	—	November 16, 2006	Mount Lemmon	Mount Lemmon Survey	·	2.2 km	MPC · JPL
644572	2006 WN_{43}	—	November 16, 2006	Mount Lemmon	Mount Lemmon Survey	EUN	1.0 km	MPC · JPL
644573	2006 WX_{46}	—	November 1, 2006	Mount Lemmon	Mount Lemmon Survey	·	2.2 km	MPC · JPL
644574	2006 WK_{47}	—	November 16, 2006	Kitt Peak	Spacewatch	·	2.5 km	MPC · JPL
644575	2006 WA_{51}	—	November 16, 2006	Kitt Peak	Spacewatch	·	2.8 km	MPC · JPL
644576	2006 WR_{53}	—	November 16, 2006	Kitt Peak	Spacewatch	EUP	3.1 km	MPC · JPL
644577	2006 WU_{53}	—	November 16, 2006	Kitt Peak	Spacewatch	URS	2.5 km	MPC · JPL
644578	2006 WX_{56}	—	November 16, 2006	Kitt Peak	Spacewatch	·	2.1 km	MPC · JPL
644579	2006 WX_{58}	—	November 17, 2006	Kitt Peak	Spacewatch	·	2.0 km	MPC · JPL
644580	2006 WU_{59}	—	October 13, 2006	Kitt Peak	Spacewatch	EUN	890 m	MPC · JPL
644581	2006 WR_{60}	—	November 17, 2006	Mount Lemmon	Mount Lemmon Survey	·	570 m	MPC · JPL
644582	2006 WR_{62}	—	November 17, 2006	Mount Lemmon	Mount Lemmon Survey	·	650 m	MPC · JPL
644583	2006 WV_{62}	—	November 17, 2006	Mount Lemmon	Mount Lemmon Survey	·	2.5 km	MPC · JPL
644584	2006 WZ_{62}	—	November 17, 2006	Mount Lemmon	Mount Lemmon Survey	·	2.1 km	MPC · JPL
644585	2006 WZ_{65}	—	November 17, 2006	Mount Lemmon	Mount Lemmon Survey	·	1.1 km	MPC · JPL
644586	2006 WW_{66}	—	November 17, 2006	Mount Lemmon	Mount Lemmon Survey	·	1.9 km	MPC · JPL
644587	2006 WB_{67}	—	November 17, 2006	Mount Lemmon	Mount Lemmon Survey	·	1.3 km	MPC · JPL
644588	2006 WP_{67}	—	November 17, 2006	Mount Lemmon	Mount Lemmon Survey	VER	2.1 km	MPC · JPL
644589	2006 WX_{67}	—	November 17, 2006	Mount Lemmon	Mount Lemmon Survey	·	1.2 km	MPC · JPL
644590	2006 WY_{67}	—	November 17, 2006	Mount Lemmon	Mount Lemmon Survey	·	620 m	MPC · JPL
644591	2006 WM_{69}	—	January 11, 2003	Kitt Peak	Spacewatch	·	1.1 km	MPC · JPL
644592	2006 WF_{76}	—	November 18, 2006	Kitt Peak	Spacewatch	·	2.6 km	MPC · JPL
644593	2006 WR_{76}	—	October 28, 2006	Mount Lemmon	Mount Lemmon Survey	·	1.6 km	MPC · JPL
644594	2006 WD_{77}	—	November 10, 2006	Kitt Peak	Spacewatch	·	1.5 km	MPC · JPL
644595	2006 WU_{77}	—	November 18, 2006	Kitt Peak	Spacewatch	·	1.9 km	MPC · JPL
644596	2006 WC_{78}	—	September 30, 2006	Mount Lemmon	Mount Lemmon Survey	·	1.2 km	MPC · JPL
644597	2006 WE_{80}	—	November 18, 2006	Kitt Peak	Spacewatch	·	2.3 km	MPC · JPL
644598	2006 WE_{83}	—	November 18, 2006	Kitt Peak	Spacewatch	(69559)	2.6 km	MPC · JPL
644599	2006 WQ_{83}	—	November 18, 2006	Kitt Peak	Spacewatch	·	1.9 km	MPC · JPL
644600	2006 WS_{84}	—	October 22, 2006	Catalina	CSS	·	700 m	MPC · JPL

== 644601–644700 ==
back to top

Designation			Discovery			Properties		Ref
Permanent	Provisional	Named after	Date	Site	Discoverer(s)	Category	Diam.	Ref
644601	2006 WL_{87}	—	November 18, 2006	Mount Lemmon	Mount Lemmon Survey	·	1.9 km	MPC · JPL
644602	2006 WZ_{87}	—	October 23, 2006	Mount Lemmon	Mount Lemmon Survey	·	990 m	MPC · JPL
644603	2006 WL_{96}	—	November 19, 2006	Kitt Peak	Spacewatch	·	1.0 km	MPC · JPL
644604	2006 WR_{96}	—	November 19, 2006	Kitt Peak	Spacewatch	·	2.0 km	MPC · JPL
644605	2006 WA_{99}	—	November 19, 2006	Kitt Peak	Spacewatch	·	2.2 km	MPC · JPL
644606	2006 WV_{101}	—	December 5, 2002	Palomar	NEAT	·	1.1 km	MPC · JPL
644607	2006 WE_{104}	—	November 19, 2006	Kitt Peak	Spacewatch	·	1.8 km	MPC · JPL
644608	2006 WL_{105}	—	November 19, 2006	Kitt Peak	Spacewatch	·	2.5 km	MPC · JPL
644609	2006 WE_{107}	—	November 19, 2006	Catalina	CSS	·	1.5 km	MPC · JPL
644610	2006 WJ_{111}	—	November 19, 2006	Kitt Peak	Spacewatch	·	2.1 km	MPC · JPL
644611	2006 WT_{113}	—	November 20, 2006	Kitt Peak	Spacewatch	·	2.0 km	MPC · JPL
644612	2006 WH_{114}	—	November 20, 2006	Kitt Peak	Spacewatch	·	2.7 km	MPC · JPL
644613	2006 WX_{114}	—	November 20, 2006	Kitt Peak	Spacewatch	EOS	1.4 km	MPC · JPL
644614	2006 WK_{115}	—	October 2, 2006	Mount Lemmon	Mount Lemmon Survey	·	2.5 km	MPC · JPL
644615	2006 WQ_{116}	—	November 2, 2006	Mount Lemmon	Mount Lemmon Survey	EOS	1.8 km	MPC · JPL
644616	2006 WT_{116}	—	November 20, 2006	Mount Lemmon	Mount Lemmon Survey	·	3.7 km	MPC · JPL
644617	2006 WZ_{117}	—	November 20, 2006	Mount Lemmon	Mount Lemmon Survey	·	1.9 km	MPC · JPL
644618	2006 WL_{118}	—	November 20, 2006	Mount Lemmon	Mount Lemmon Survey	·	1.3 km	MPC · JPL
644619	2006 WN_{118}	—	November 20, 2006	Mount Lemmon	Mount Lemmon Survey	·	1.9 km	MPC · JPL
644620	2006 WY_{119}	—	November 14, 2006	Kitt Peak	Spacewatch	·	1.7 km	MPC · JPL
644621	2006 WD_{121}	—	November 21, 2006	Mount Lemmon	Mount Lemmon Survey	·	960 m	MPC · JPL
644622	2006 WG_{123}	—	November 21, 2006	Mount Lemmon	Mount Lemmon Survey	·	2.4 km	MPC · JPL
644623	2006 WX_{124}	—	November 22, 2006	Mount Lemmon	Mount Lemmon Survey	·	2.2 km	MPC · JPL
644624	2006 WQ_{131}	—	November 17, 2006	Mount Lemmon	Mount Lemmon Survey	·	1.4 km	MPC · JPL
644625	2006 WX_{131}	—	November 17, 2006	Mount Lemmon	Mount Lemmon Survey	·	2.6 km	MPC · JPL
644626	2006 WB_{132}	—	November 18, 2006	Kitt Peak	Spacewatch	·	1.0 km	MPC · JPL
644627	2006 WH_{132}	—	November 18, 2006	Kitt Peak	Spacewatch	·	2.1 km	MPC · JPL
644628	2006 WK_{133}	—	November 1, 2006	Mount Lemmon	Mount Lemmon Survey	·	1.5 km	MPC · JPL
644629	2006 WQ_{134}	—	October 2, 2006	Mount Lemmon	Mount Lemmon Survey	·	2.3 km	MPC · JPL
644630	2006 WW_{135}	—	November 18, 2006	Mount Lemmon	Mount Lemmon Survey	·	1.3 km	MPC · JPL
644631	2006 WY_{135}	—	November 18, 2006	Mount Lemmon	Mount Lemmon Survey	·	2.0 km	MPC · JPL
644632	2006 WK_{138}	—	October 22, 2006	Catalina	CSS	·	2.3 km	MPC · JPL
644633	2006 WS_{142}	—	November 20, 2006	Kitt Peak	Spacewatch	MAR	970 m	MPC · JPL
644634	2006 WB_{144}	—	November 20, 2006	Kitt Peak	Spacewatch	·	2.3 km	MPC · JPL
644635	2006 WN_{144}	—	November 20, 2006	Kitt Peak	Spacewatch	VER	1.9 km	MPC · JPL
644636	2006 WU_{145}	—	November 20, 2006	Kitt Peak	Spacewatch	·	1.3 km	MPC · JPL
644637	2006 WW_{146}	—	November 20, 2006	Kitt Peak	Spacewatch	·	1.2 km	MPC · JPL
644638	2006 WC_{147}	—	November 20, 2006	Kitt Peak	Spacewatch	·	1.9 km	MPC · JPL
644639	2006 WE_{147}	—	October 19, 2006	Mount Lemmon	Mount Lemmon Survey	·	1.5 km	MPC · JPL
644640	2006 WQ_{147}	—	November 11, 2006	Mount Lemmon	Mount Lemmon Survey	TIR	2.2 km	MPC · JPL
644641	2006 WU_{147}	—	November 20, 2006	Kitt Peak	Spacewatch	·	1.1 km	MPC · JPL
644642	2006 WE_{150}	—	November 16, 2006	Kitt Peak	Spacewatch	EOS	1.7 km	MPC · JPL
644643	2006 WW_{150}	—	November 20, 2006	Mount Lemmon	Mount Lemmon Survey	·	2.7 km	MPC · JPL
644644	2006 WG_{152}	—	February 15, 2004	Palomar	NEAT	·	1.7 km	MPC · JPL
644645	2006 WC_{154}	—	October 28, 2006	Mount Lemmon	Mount Lemmon Survey	·	2.3 km	MPC · JPL
644646	2006 WC_{158}	—	November 22, 2006	Kitt Peak	Spacewatch	EUN	830 m	MPC · JPL
644647	2006 WM_{161}	—	October 19, 2006	Mount Lemmon	Mount Lemmon Survey	THM	1.6 km	MPC · JPL
644648	2006 WQ_{161}	—	November 23, 2006	Kitt Peak	Spacewatch	·	1.4 km	MPC · JPL
644649	2006 WS_{162}	—	October 22, 2006	Mount Lemmon	Mount Lemmon Survey	·	2.1 km	MPC · JPL
644650	2006 WZ_{163}	—	November 12, 2006	Mount Lemmon	Mount Lemmon Survey	·	1.6 km	MPC · JPL
644651	2006 WE_{164}	—	November 23, 2006	Kitt Peak	Spacewatch	·	2.6 km	MPC · JPL
644652	2006 WS_{164}	—	October 20, 2006	Mount Lemmon	Mount Lemmon Survey	·	2.1 km	MPC · JPL
644653	2006 WY_{164}	—	November 15, 2006	Kitt Peak	Spacewatch	HYG	2.1 km	MPC · JPL
644654	2006 WS_{165}	—	November 11, 2006	Mount Lemmon	Mount Lemmon Survey	·	2.6 km	MPC · JPL
644655	2006 WG_{166}	—	November 23, 2006	Kitt Peak	Spacewatch	·	2.2 km	MPC · JPL
644656	2006 WL_{168}	—	November 23, 2006	Kitt Peak	Spacewatch	·	2.5 km	MPC · JPL
644657	2006 WP_{170}	—	November 23, 2006	Kitt Peak	Spacewatch	EUN	840 m	MPC · JPL
644658	2006 WQ_{171}	—	November 23, 2006	Kitt Peak	Spacewatch	·	1.2 km	MPC · JPL
644659	2006 WS_{171}	—	November 23, 2006	Kitt Peak	Spacewatch	·	2.2 km	MPC · JPL
644660	2006 WE_{172}	—	November 23, 2006	Mount Lemmon	Mount Lemmon Survey	EOS	1.7 km	MPC · JPL
644661	2006 WG_{172}	—	November 23, 2006	Kitt Peak	Spacewatch	·	2.4 km	MPC · JPL
644662	2006 WK_{176}	—	November 23, 2006	Mount Lemmon	Mount Lemmon Survey	·	730 m	MPC · JPL
644663	2006 WO_{176}	—	November 11, 2006	Mount Lemmon	Mount Lemmon Survey	·	2.2 km	MPC · JPL
644664	2006 WP_{177}	—	November 23, 2006	Mount Lemmon	Mount Lemmon Survey	VER	2.2 km	MPC · JPL
644665	2006 WX_{178}	—	November 24, 2006	Kitt Peak	Spacewatch	·	3.2 km	MPC · JPL
644666	2006 WV_{179}	—	November 24, 2006	Mount Lemmon	Mount Lemmon Survey	·	2.0 km	MPC · JPL
644667	2006 WG_{183}	—	October 17, 2006	Mount Lemmon	Mount Lemmon Survey	ELF	3.3 km	MPC · JPL
644668	2006 WE_{187}	—	November 15, 2006	Catalina	CSS	·	2.8 km	MPC · JPL
644669	2006 WW_{199}	—	November 16, 2006	Mount Lemmon	Mount Lemmon Survey	·	2.8 km	MPC · JPL
644670	2006 WR_{200}	—	November 22, 2006	Mount Lemmon	Mount Lemmon Survey	·	2.3 km	MPC · JPL
644671	2006 WG_{203}	—	November 25, 2006	Kitt Peak	Spacewatch	·	620 m	MPC · JPL
644672	2006 WS_{204}	—	April 15, 2013	Haleakala	Pan-STARRS 1	·	1.1 km	MPC · JPL
644673	2006 WJ_{208}	—	November 18, 2006	Kitt Peak	Spacewatch	·	730 m	MPC · JPL
644674	2006 WW_{208}	—	November 18, 2006	Mount Lemmon	Mount Lemmon Survey	·	670 m	MPC · JPL
644675	2006 WG_{209}	—	November 22, 2006	Mount Lemmon	Mount Lemmon Survey	·	1.2 km	MPC · JPL
644676	2006 WH_{209}	—	November 22, 2006	Mount Lemmon	Mount Lemmon Survey	·	540 m	MPC · JPL
644677	2006 WU_{209}	—	November 17, 2006	Kitt Peak	Spacewatch	·	1.8 km	MPC · JPL
644678	2006 WH_{210}	—	November 26, 2012	Mount Lemmon	Mount Lemmon Survey	EOS	1.7 km	MPC · JPL
644679	2006 WO_{210}	—	November 18, 2006	Mount Lemmon	Mount Lemmon Survey	·	1.8 km	MPC · JPL
644680	2006 WP_{210}	—	November 26, 2012	Mount Lemmon	Mount Lemmon Survey	VER	2.1 km	MPC · JPL
644681	2006 WQ_{210}	—	November 10, 2010	Mount Lemmon	Mount Lemmon Survey	KON	2.2 km	MPC · JPL
644682	2006 WU_{210}	—	September 27, 2011	Mount Lemmon	Mount Lemmon Survey	·	2.9 km	MPC · JPL
644683	2006 WA_{211}	—	September 26, 2006	Catalina	CSS	TIR	2.7 km	MPC · JPL
644684	2006 WC_{211}	—	October 21, 2006	Catalina	CSS	·	2.4 km	MPC · JPL
644685	2006 WF_{211}	—	August 3, 2017	Haleakala	Pan-STARRS 1	·	2.5 km	MPC · JPL
644686	2006 WM_{211}	—	August 1, 2017	Haleakala	Pan-STARRS 1	VER	2.2 km	MPC · JPL
644687	2006 WN_{211}	—	November 19, 2006	Kitt Peak	Spacewatch	THM	1.8 km	MPC · JPL
644688	2006 WQ_{211}	—	November 19, 2006	Kitt Peak	Spacewatch	EOS	1.6 km	MPC · JPL
644689	2006 WT_{211}	—	April 25, 2015	Haleakala	Pan-STARRS 1	·	2.4 km	MPC · JPL
644690	2006 WV_{211}	—	October 1, 2006	Kitt Peak	Spacewatch	THM	1.8 km	MPC · JPL
644691	2006 WA_{212}	—	September 19, 2011	Haleakala	Pan-STARRS 1	VER	2.3 km	MPC · JPL
644692	2006 WE_{212}	—	November 22, 2006	Kitt Peak	Spacewatch	VER	2.1 km	MPC · JPL
644693	2006 WN_{212}	—	May 15, 2012	Haleakala	Pan-STARRS 1	PHO	820 m	MPC · JPL
644694	2006 WR_{212}	—	March 6, 2008	Mount Lemmon	Mount Lemmon Survey	·	2.0 km	MPC · JPL
644695	2006 WT_{212}	—	November 19, 2006	Catalina	CSS	·	1.8 km	MPC · JPL
644696	2006 WD_{213}	—	April 3, 2011	Haleakala	Pan-STARRS 1	·	500 m	MPC · JPL
644697	2006 WF_{213}	—	August 1, 2016	Haleakala	Pan-STARRS 1	HYG	2.0 km	MPC · JPL
644698	2006 WJ_{213}	—	September 26, 2017	Haleakala	Pan-STARRS 1	VER	2.0 km	MPC · JPL
644699	2006 WN_{213}	—	October 19, 2011	Haleakala	Pan-STARRS 1	·	2.2 km	MPC · JPL
644700	2006 WO_{213}	—	November 19, 2006	Catalina	CSS	·	2.8 km	MPC · JPL

== 644701–644800 ==
back to top

Designation			Discovery			Properties		Ref
Permanent	Provisional	Named after	Date	Site	Discoverer(s)	Category	Diam.	Ref
644701	2006 WT_{213}	—	May 21, 2015	Cerro Tololo	DECam	VER	2.1 km	MPC · JPL
644702	2006 WX_{213}	—	August 2, 2016	Haleakala	Pan-STARRS 1	·	560 m	MPC · JPL
644703	2006 WD_{214}	—	November 16, 2006	Kitt Peak	Spacewatch	·	2.7 km	MPC · JPL
644704	2006 WF_{214}	—	November 14, 2006	Kitt Peak	Spacewatch	EOS	1.5 km	MPC · JPL
644705	2006 WK_{214}	—	March 9, 2011	Mount Lemmon	Mount Lemmon Survey	·	550 m	MPC · JPL
644706	2006 WL_{214}	—	March 11, 2008	Mount Lemmon	Mount Lemmon Survey	·	1.1 km	MPC · JPL
644707	2006 WC_{215}	—	January 5, 2012	Haleakala	Pan-STARRS 1	·	970 m	MPC · JPL
644708	2006 WJ_{215}	—	February 1, 2012	Kitt Peak	Spacewatch	·	1.2 km	MPC · JPL
644709	2006 WK_{215}	—	August 31, 2017	Haleakala	Pan-STARRS 1	·	2.1 km	MPC · JPL
644710	2006 WW_{215}	—	December 11, 2013	Mount Lemmon	Mount Lemmon Survey	·	530 m	MPC · JPL
644711	2006 WY_{215}	—	October 30, 2010	Mount Lemmon	Mount Lemmon Survey	·	1.2 km	MPC · JPL
644712	2006 WD_{216}	—	November 17, 2006	Mount Lemmon	Mount Lemmon Survey	·	2.1 km	MPC · JPL
644713	2006 WH_{216}	—	July 7, 2016	Haleakala	Pan-STARRS 1	·	1.7 km	MPC · JPL
644714	2006 WJ_{216}	—	November 7, 2012	Mount Lemmon	Mount Lemmon Survey	·	2.3 km	MPC · JPL
644715	2006 WU_{217}	—	January 10, 2008	Kitt Peak	Spacewatch	·	2.1 km	MPC · JPL
644716	2006 WZ_{217}	—	November 23, 2006	Kitt Peak	Spacewatch	·	630 m	MPC · JPL
644717	2006 WF_{218}	—	October 2, 2014	Haleakala	Pan-STARRS 1	·	940 m	MPC · JPL
644718	2006 WG_{218}	—	June 18, 2015	Haleakala	Pan-STARRS 1	·	2.4 km	MPC · JPL
644719	2006 WL_{218}	—	April 4, 2017	Haleakala	Pan-STARRS 1	·	1.7 km	MPC · JPL
644720	2006 WR_{218}	—	September 26, 2017	Haleakala	Pan-STARRS 1	·	2.3 km	MPC · JPL
644721	2006 WU_{218}	—	March 9, 2011	Mount Lemmon	Mount Lemmon Survey	·	600 m	MPC · JPL
644722	2006 WY_{218}	—	November 24, 2006	Mount Lemmon	Mount Lemmon Survey	·	2.2 km	MPC · JPL
644723	2006 WB_{219}	—	September 19, 2011	Haleakala	Pan-STARRS 1	·	2.3 km	MPC · JPL
644724	2006 WO_{219}	—	November 30, 2006	Kitt Peak	Spacewatch	·	1.1 km	MPC · JPL
644725	2006 WU_{219}	—	December 14, 2015	Haleakala	Pan-STARRS 1	EUN	900 m	MPC · JPL
644726	2006 WX_{219}	—	October 18, 2017	Mount Lemmon	Mount Lemmon Survey	·	3.2 km	MPC · JPL
644727	2006 WY_{219}	—	August 20, 2009	Kitt Peak	Spacewatch	·	500 m	MPC · JPL
644728	2006 WK_{220}	—	March 2, 2008	Mount Lemmon	Mount Lemmon Survey	·	2.2 km	MPC · JPL
644729	2006 WV_{220}	—	September 28, 2009	Mount Lemmon	Mount Lemmon Survey	·	570 m	MPC · JPL
644730	2006 WW_{220}	—	April 25, 2015	Haleakala	Pan-STARRS 1	HYG	2.0 km	MPC · JPL
644731	2006 WP_{221}	—	February 27, 2014	Haleakala	Pan-STARRS 1	EOS	1.6 km	MPC · JPL
644732	2006 WT_{221}	—	February 3, 2008	Mount Lemmon	Mount Lemmon Survey	·	2.5 km	MPC · JPL
644733	2006 WV_{221}	—	October 22, 2017	Mount Lemmon	Mount Lemmon Survey	·	2.4 km	MPC · JPL
644734	2006 WW_{221}	—	January 29, 2012	Haleakala	Pan-STARRS 1	·	1.6 km	MPC · JPL
644735	2006 WZ_{221}	—	July 27, 2014	Haleakala	Pan-STARRS 1	·	1.2 km	MPC · JPL
644736	2006 WF_{222}	—	April 23, 2014	Haleakala	Pan-STARRS 1	·	2.0 km	MPC · JPL
644737	2006 WR_{222}	—	August 31, 2014	Kitt Peak	Spacewatch	·	1.1 km	MPC · JPL
644738	2006 WT_{222}	—	November 16, 2006	Catalina	CSS	·	2.4 km	MPC · JPL
644739	2006 WE_{223}	—	November 18, 2006	Kitt Peak	Spacewatch	·	1.1 km	MPC · JPL
644740	2006 WU_{223}	—	January 12, 2016	Haleakala	Pan-STARRS 1	HNS	1.0 km	MPC · JPL
644741	2006 WB_{224}	—	November 23, 2006	Kitt Peak	Spacewatch	·	2.2 km	MPC · JPL
644742	2006 WF_{224}	—	November 13, 2012	Mount Lemmon	Mount Lemmon Survey	·	2.4 km	MPC · JPL
644743	2006 WQ_{224}	—	September 4, 2011	Haleakala	Pan-STARRS 1	VER	1.8 km	MPC · JPL
644744	2006 WC_{225}	—	September 14, 2017	Haleakala	Pan-STARRS 1	·	2.5 km	MPC · JPL
644745	2006 WJ_{225}	—	October 30, 2017	Haleakala	Pan-STARRS 1	EOS	1.4 km	MPC · JPL
644746	2006 WR_{225}	—	November 18, 2006	Mount Lemmon	Mount Lemmon Survey	·	2.5 km	MPC · JPL
644747	2006 WS_{225}	—	August 30, 2016	Mount Lemmon	Mount Lemmon Survey	·	2.2 km	MPC · JPL
644748	2006 WC_{226}	—	July 14, 2016	Haleakala	Pan-STARRS 1	·	2.4 km	MPC · JPL
644749	2006 WV_{226}	—	October 18, 2017	Haleakala	Pan-STARRS 1	·	2.2 km	MPC · JPL
644750	2006 WE_{227}	—	August 1, 2017	Haleakala	Pan-STARRS 1	·	2.6 km	MPC · JPL
644751	2006 WU_{229}	—	November 22, 2006	Kitt Peak	Spacewatch	·	2.2 km	MPC · JPL
644752	2006 WY_{229}	—	November 22, 2006	Kitt Peak	Spacewatch	·	890 m	MPC · JPL
644753	2006 WA_{230}	—	November 25, 2006	Mount Lemmon	Mount Lemmon Survey	·	2.3 km	MPC · JPL
644754	2006 WB_{230}	—	November 18, 2006	Kitt Peak	Spacewatch	·	2.6 km	MPC · JPL
644755	2006 WC_{230}	—	November 17, 2006	Kitt Peak	Spacewatch	EUN	830 m	MPC · JPL
644756	2006 WL_{230}	—	November 23, 2006	Kitt Peak	Spacewatch	·	2.4 km	MPC · JPL
644757	2006 WN_{230}	—	November 27, 2006	Kitt Peak	Spacewatch	·	2.7 km	MPC · JPL
644758	2006 WO_{230}	—	November 17, 2006	Mount Lemmon	Mount Lemmon Survey	·	870 m	MPC · JPL
644759	2006 WG_{231}	—	November 17, 2006	Kitt Peak	Spacewatch	·	1.2 km	MPC · JPL
644760	2006 WS_{231}	—	November 19, 2006	Kitt Peak	Spacewatch	EUN	960 m	MPC · JPL
644761	2006 WK_{232}	—	November 24, 2006	Kitt Peak	Spacewatch	·	2.4 km	MPC · JPL
644762	2006 WN_{232}	—	November 24, 2006	Mount Lemmon	Mount Lemmon Survey	·	2.2 km	MPC · JPL
644763	2006 WR_{232}	—	November 16, 2006	Kitt Peak	Spacewatch	·	810 m	MPC · JPL
644764	2006 WQ_{234}	—	November 17, 2006	Kitt Peak	Spacewatch	·	2.2 km	MPC · JPL
644765	2006 WU_{234}	—	November 16, 2006	Kitt Peak	Spacewatch	·	930 m	MPC · JPL
644766	2006 WW_{234}	—	November 21, 2006	Mount Lemmon	Mount Lemmon Survey	·	2.1 km	MPC · JPL
644767	2006 WC_{235}	—	November 22, 2006	Kitt Peak	Spacewatch	·	2.5 km	MPC · JPL
644768	2006 WX_{236}	—	November 20, 2006	Kitt Peak	Spacewatch	·	2.4 km	MPC · JPL
644769	2006 XS_{8}	—	November 23, 2006	Kitt Peak	Spacewatch	·	1.7 km	MPC · JPL
644770	2006 XG_{9}	—	December 9, 2006	Kitt Peak	Spacewatch	HNS	850 m	MPC · JPL
644771	2006 XB_{10}	—	December 9, 2006	Kitt Peak	Spacewatch	EUP	2.6 km	MPC · JPL
644772	2006 XO_{10}	—	November 27, 2006	Mount Lemmon	Mount Lemmon Survey	·	670 m	MPC · JPL
644773	2006 XN_{13}	—	September 26, 1992	Kitt Peak	Spacewatch	·	550 m	MPC · JPL
644774	2006 XX_{14}	—	December 10, 2006	Kitt Peak	Spacewatch	·	3.3 km	MPC · JPL
644775	2006 XE_{21}	—	December 11, 2006	Kitt Peak	Spacewatch	·	2.1 km	MPC · JPL
644776	2006 XO_{23}	—	November 25, 2006	Mount Lemmon	Mount Lemmon Survey	·	1.7 km	MPC · JPL
644777	2006 XQ_{23}	—	November 25, 2006	Mount Lemmon	Mount Lemmon Survey	HNS	860 m	MPC · JPL
644778	2006 XP_{29}	—	December 13, 2006	Mount Lemmon	Mount Lemmon Survey	VER	2.1 km	MPC · JPL
644779	2006 XU_{29}	—	December 13, 2006	Socorro	LINEAR	EUP	3.9 km	MPC · JPL
644780	2006 XX_{29}	—	December 13, 2006	Mount Lemmon	Mount Lemmon Survey	JUN	880 m	MPC · JPL
644781	2006 XV_{31}	—	December 12, 2006	Marly	P. Kocher	·	720 m	MPC · JPL
644782	2006 XX_{36}	—	December 11, 2006	Kitt Peak	Spacewatch	·	3.4 km	MPC · JPL
644783	2006 XU_{39}	—	December 12, 2006	Kitt Peak	Spacewatch	·	1.1 km	MPC · JPL
644784	2006 XE_{40}	—	November 19, 2006	Kitt Peak	Spacewatch	·	2.2 km	MPC · JPL
644785	2006 XJ_{40}	—	November 15, 2006	Kitt Peak	Spacewatch	THM	1.5 km	MPC · JPL
644786	2006 XL_{40}	—	December 12, 2006	Kitt Peak	Spacewatch	EUN	830 m	MPC · JPL
644787	2006 XM_{41}	—	December 12, 2006	Mount Lemmon	Mount Lemmon Survey	·	570 m	MPC · JPL
644788	2006 XD_{42}	—	December 12, 2006	Mount Lemmon	Mount Lemmon Survey	·	970 m	MPC · JPL
644789	2006 XH_{42}	—	December 12, 2006	Mount Lemmon	Mount Lemmon Survey	·	620 m	MPC · JPL
644790	2006 XY_{43}	—	December 12, 2006	Mount Lemmon	Mount Lemmon Survey	·	1.5 km	MPC · JPL
644791	2006 XU_{44}	—	December 13, 2006	Kitt Peak	Spacewatch	·	2.5 km	MPC · JPL
644792	2006 XT_{55}	—	September 13, 2005	Kitt Peak	Spacewatch	THM	1.8 km	MPC · JPL
644793	2006 XM_{59}	—	November 22, 2006	Mount Lemmon	Mount Lemmon Survey	·	1.2 km	MPC · JPL
644794	2006 XG_{71}	—	December 15, 2006	Kitt Peak	Spacewatch	HNS	1.4 km	MPC · JPL
644795	2006 XH_{72}	—	December 12, 2006	Mount Lemmon	Mount Lemmon Survey	·	3.0 km	MPC · JPL
644796	2006 XC_{73}	—	December 12, 2006	Mount Lemmon	Mount Lemmon Survey	·	1.2 km	MPC · JPL
644797	2006 XP_{74}	—	December 15, 2006	Mount Lemmon	Mount Lemmon Survey	·	2.9 km	MPC · JPL
644798	2006 XA_{75}	—	December 24, 2006	Catalina	CSS	HNS	1.3 km	MPC · JPL
644799	2006 XM_{75}	—	December 13, 2006	Kitt Peak	Spacewatch	·	2.7 km	MPC · JPL
644800	2006 XO_{75}	—	April 14, 2008	Mount Lemmon	Mount Lemmon Survey	·	2.4 km	MPC · JPL

== 644801–644900 ==
back to top

Designation			Discovery			Properties		Ref
Permanent	Provisional	Named after	Date	Site	Discoverer(s)	Category	Diam.	Ref
644801	2006 XR_{75}	—	May 23, 2014	Haleakala	Pan-STARRS 1	TIR	2.3 km	MPC · JPL
644802	2006 XS_{75}	—	December 23, 2012	Haleakala	Pan-STARRS 1	·	2.3 km	MPC · JPL
644803	2006 XV_{75}	—	March 30, 2014	Cerro Tololo	DECam	·	2.1 km	MPC · JPL
644804	2006 XD_{76}	—	December 1, 2010	Mount Lemmon	Mount Lemmon Survey	(5)	810 m	MPC · JPL
644805	2006 XF_{76}	—	December 9, 2006	Kitt Peak	Spacewatch	·	510 m	MPC · JPL
644806	2006 XU_{76}	—	May 31, 2014	Haleakala	Pan-STARRS 1	EUP	3.9 km	MPC · JPL
644807	2006 XZ_{76}	—	November 8, 2010	Kitt Peak	Spacewatch	ADE	1.6 km	MPC · JPL
644808	2006 XE_{77}	—	April 30, 2014	Haleakala	Pan-STARRS 1	·	2.4 km	MPC · JPL
644809	2006 XG_{77}	—	November 23, 2006	Kitt Peak	Spacewatch	THB	2.6 km	MPC · JPL
644810	2006 XC_{78}	—	December 13, 2006	Kitt Peak	Spacewatch	·	1.1 km	MPC · JPL
644811	2006 XG_{78}	—	December 13, 2006	Mount Lemmon	Mount Lemmon Survey	VER	2.4 km	MPC · JPL
644812	2006 XE_{79}	—	May 7, 2014	Haleakala	Pan-STARRS 1	·	2.7 km	MPC · JPL
644813	2006 XJ_{79}	—	December 14, 2006	Mount Lemmon	Mount Lemmon Survey	THM	1.6 km	MPC · JPL
644814	2006 XN_{79}	—	December 13, 2006	Kitt Peak	Spacewatch	·	780 m	MPC · JPL
644815	2006 XO_{79}	—	January 15, 2016	Haleakala	Pan-STARRS 1	BAR	1.4 km	MPC · JPL
644816	2006 XX_{79}	—	December 13, 2006	Catalina	CSS	HNS	1.4 km	MPC · JPL
644817	2006 XO_{80}	—	December 15, 2006	Kitt Peak	Spacewatch	VER	2.7 km	MPC · JPL
644818	2006 XR_{80}	—	December 13, 2006	Kitt Peak	Spacewatch	·	2.8 km	MPC · JPL
644819	2006 XN_{81}	—	December 13, 2006	Mount Lemmon	Mount Lemmon Survey	·	970 m	MPC · JPL
644820	2006 XX_{81}	—	December 13, 2006	Kitt Peak	Spacewatch	·	560 m	MPC · JPL
644821	2006 XY_{81}	—	December 14, 2006	Mount Lemmon	Mount Lemmon Survey	·	620 m	MPC · JPL
644822	2006 XA_{82}	—	December 13, 2006	Kitt Peak	Spacewatch	·	1.1 km	MPC · JPL
644823	2006 XB_{82}	—	December 14, 2006	Mount Lemmon	Mount Lemmon Survey	·	2.3 km	MPC · JPL
644824	2006 XQ_{82}	—	December 14, 2006	Mount Lemmon	Mount Lemmon Survey	·	2.1 km	MPC · JPL
644825	2006 XF_{83}	—	December 11, 2006	Kitt Peak	Spacewatch	THM	1.9 km	MPC · JPL
644826	2006 YO	—	November 11, 2006	Kitt Peak	Spacewatch	·	1.4 km	MPC · JPL
644827	2006 YS	—	December 16, 2006	Kitt Peak	Spacewatch	·	2.3 km	MPC · JPL
644828	2006 YU	—	November 17, 2006	Kitt Peak	Spacewatch	·	2.7 km	MPC · JPL
644829	2006 YA_{1}	—	December 16, 2006	Kitt Peak	Spacewatch	·	3.1 km	MPC · JPL
644830	2006 YC_{3}	—	December 18, 2006	Kanab	Sherdian, E.	·	2.4 km	MPC · JPL
644831	2006 YK_{4}	—	November 17, 2006	Mount Lemmon	Mount Lemmon Survey	·	1 km	MPC · JPL
644832	2006 YH_{5}	—	August 6, 2005	Palomar	NEAT	·	1.5 km	MPC · JPL
644833	2006 YR_{5}	—	December 17, 2006	Mount Lemmon	Mount Lemmon Survey	·	1.0 km	MPC · JPL
644834	2006 YP_{11}	—	September 27, 2006	Mount Lemmon	Mount Lemmon Survey	·	580 m	MPC · JPL
644835	2006 YY_{12}	—	December 24, 2006	Gnosca	S. Sposetti	·	2.9 km	MPC · JPL
644836	2006 YW_{13}	—	August 25, 2005	Palomar	NEAT	(58892)	3.7 km	MPC · JPL
644837	2006 YA_{14}	—	November 17, 2014	Haleakala	Pan-STARRS 1	·	1.0 km	MPC · JPL
644838	2006 YG_{14}	—	December 22, 2006	Piszkéstető	K. Sárneczky, Szulagyi, J.	VER	1.9 km	MPC · JPL
644839	2006 YL_{14}	—	April 1, 2003	Apache Point	SDSS Collaboration	·	2.8 km	MPC · JPL
644840	2006 YB_{19}	—	December 24, 2006	Kitt Peak	Spacewatch	·	2.7 km	MPC · JPL
644841	2006 YV_{19}	—	December 24, 2006	Kitt Peak	Spacewatch	HNS	1.0 km	MPC · JPL
644842	2006 YM_{20}	—	November 11, 2006	Mount Lemmon	Mount Lemmon Survey	·	2.5 km	MPC · JPL
644843	2006 YH_{23}	—	December 13, 2006	Kitt Peak	Spacewatch	·	940 m	MPC · JPL
644844	2006 YC_{24}	—	December 21, 2006	Kitt Peak	Spacewatch	·	2.6 km	MPC · JPL
644845	2006 YQ_{25}	—	November 22, 2006	Mount Lemmon	Mount Lemmon Survey	·	2.4 km	MPC · JPL
644846	2006 YS_{28}	—	December 21, 2006	Kitt Peak	Spacewatch	·	2.8 km	MPC · JPL
644847	2006 YC_{30}	—	December 21, 2006	Kitt Peak	Spacewatch	·	670 m	MPC · JPL
644848	2006 YT_{36}	—	November 16, 2006	Mount Lemmon	Mount Lemmon Survey	·	3.5 km	MPC · JPL
644849	2006 YW_{38}	—	December 21, 2006	Kitt Peak	Spacewatch	(5)	900 m	MPC · JPL
644850	2006 YO_{42}	—	December 23, 2006	Catalina	CSS	·	1.7 km	MPC · JPL
644851	2006 YY_{42}	—	December 24, 2006	Kitt Peak	Spacewatch	·	2.3 km	MPC · JPL
644852	2006 YN_{44}	—	December 26, 2006	Pises	Pises	·	1.8 km	MPC · JPL
644853	2006 YA_{46}	—	December 21, 2006	Mount Lemmon	Mount Lemmon Survey	·	1.2 km	MPC · JPL
644854	2006 YH_{49}	—	December 26, 2006	Mauna Kea	D. D. Balam, K. M. Perrett	·	1.4 km	MPC · JPL
644855	2006 YR_{49}	—	December 29, 2006	Pla D'Arguines	R. Ferrando, Ferrando, M.	·	1.7 km	MPC · JPL
644856	2006 YY_{56}	—	December 17, 2006	Mount Lemmon	Mount Lemmon Survey	·	3.4 km	MPC · JPL
644857	2006 YD_{57}	—	November 22, 2006	Catalina	CSS	·	2.5 km	MPC · JPL
644858	2006 YK_{57}	—	November 20, 2017	Haleakala	Pan-STARRS 1	·	2.7 km	MPC · JPL
644859	2006 YU_{57}	—	November 24, 2006	Kitt Peak	Spacewatch	·	2.0 km	MPC · JPL
644860	2006 YF_{58}	—	June 26, 2015	Haleakala	Pan-STARRS 1	·	2.2 km	MPC · JPL
644861	2006 YJ_{58}	—	December 24, 2006	Kitt Peak	Spacewatch	·	2.5 km	MPC · JPL
644862	2006 YR_{58}	—	August 6, 2014	Haleakala	Pan-STARRS 1	·	1.4 km	MPC · JPL
644863	2006 YV_{58}	—	January 6, 2013	Kitt Peak	Spacewatch	·	2.1 km	MPC · JPL
644864	2006 YW_{58}	—	April 23, 2014	Mount Lemmon	Mount Lemmon Survey	EOS	1.8 km	MPC · JPL
644865	2006 YX_{58}	—	November 28, 2011	Kitt Peak	Spacewatch	·	1.2 km	MPC · JPL
644866	2006 YE_{59}	—	December 26, 2006	Kitt Peak	Spacewatch	·	480 m	MPC · JPL
644867	2006 YT_{59}	—	May 15, 2009	Mount Lemmon	Mount Lemmon Survey	·	3.2 km	MPC · JPL
644868	2006 YX_{59}	—	December 21, 2006	Mount Lemmon	Mount Lemmon Survey	·	1.4 km	MPC · JPL
644869	2006 YK_{60}	—	March 14, 2012	Haleakala	Pan-STARRS 1	EUN	1.0 km	MPC · JPL
644870	2006 YO_{60}	—	December 4, 2013	Haleakala	Pan-STARRS 1	·	680 m	MPC · JPL
644871	2006 YP_{60}	—	October 17, 2014	Mount Lemmon	Mount Lemmon Survey	·	1.1 km	MPC · JPL
644872	2006 YU_{60}	—	December 21, 2006	Kitt Peak	Spacewatch	·	580 m	MPC · JPL
644873	2006 YW_{60}	—	August 1, 2016	Haleakala	Pan-STARRS 1	·	2.2 km	MPC · JPL
644874	2006 YZ_{60}	—	December 26, 2006	Kitt Peak	Spacewatch	·	1.3 km	MPC · JPL
644875	2006 YH_{61}	—	December 21, 2006	Kitt Peak	Spacewatch	·	540 m	MPC · JPL
644876	2006 YA_{62}	—	November 22, 2006	Mount Lemmon	Mount Lemmon Survey	·	1.9 km	MPC · JPL
644877	2006 YC_{62}	—	March 24, 2014	Haleakala	Pan-STARRS 1	·	2.7 km	MPC · JPL
644878	2006 YE_{62}	—	December 13, 2017	Haleakala	Pan-STARRS 1	HYG	2.0 km	MPC · JPL
644879	2006 YH_{62}	—	March 11, 2014	Mount Lemmon	Mount Lemmon Survey	·	640 m	MPC · JPL
644880	2006 YH_{63}	—	November 25, 2006	Kitt Peak	Spacewatch	EUN	1.1 km	MPC · JPL
644881	2006 YJ_{63}	—	July 9, 2013	Haleakala	Pan-STARRS 1	MAR	1.0 km	MPC · JPL
644882	2006 YS_{63}	—	April 29, 2014	Haleakala	Pan-STARRS 1	·	2.2 km	MPC · JPL
644883	2006 YW_{64}	—	August 4, 2017	Haleakala	Pan-STARRS 1	·	2.5 km	MPC · JPL
644884	2006 YX_{64}	—	September 27, 2011	Mount Lemmon	Mount Lemmon Survey	·	2.7 km	MPC · JPL
644885	2006 YA_{65}	—	November 29, 2013	Kitt Peak	Spacewatch	·	640 m	MPC · JPL
644886	2006 YM_{66}	—	March 7, 2016	Haleakala	Pan-STARRS 1	·	1.1 km	MPC · JPL
644887	2006 YP_{66}	—	November 17, 2014	Haleakala	Pan-STARRS 1	·	1.1 km	MPC · JPL
644888	2006 YV_{66}	—	December 15, 2017	Mount Lemmon	Mount Lemmon Survey	·	2.6 km	MPC · JPL
644889	2006 YG_{67}	—	December 22, 2006	Kitt Peak	Spacewatch	HNS	1.1 km	MPC · JPL
644890	2006 YJ_{67}	—	December 16, 2006	Catalina	CSS	·	1.5 km	MPC · JPL
644891	2006 YE_{68}	—	December 27, 2006	Mount Lemmon	Mount Lemmon Survey	·	1.6 km	MPC · JPL
644892	2006 YZ_{69}	—	December 27, 2006	Mount Lemmon	Mount Lemmon Survey	·	2.5 km	MPC · JPL
644893	2006 YD_{70}	—	December 24, 2006	Kitt Peak	Spacewatch	·	2.1 km	MPC · JPL
644894	2007 AB	—	March 13, 2003	Kitt Peak	Spacewatch	·	2.1 km	MPC · JPL
644895	2007 AX_{4}	—	December 13, 2006	Kitt Peak	Spacewatch	·	2.4 km	MPC · JPL
644896	2007 AW_{5}	—	January 8, 2007	Mount Lemmon	Mount Lemmon Survey	·	2.5 km	MPC · JPL
644897	2007 AD_{6}	—	December 25, 2006	Kitt Peak	Spacewatch	·	990 m	MPC · JPL
644898	2007 AF_{6}	—	December 15, 2006	Kitt Peak	Spacewatch	·	1.2 km	MPC · JPL
644899	2007 AB_{14}	—	January 9, 2007	Kitt Peak	Spacewatch	·	1.2 km	MPC · JPL
644900	2007 AU_{15}	—	January 10, 2007	Mount Lemmon	Mount Lemmon Survey	HNS	1.1 km	MPC · JPL

== 644901–645000 ==
back to top

Designation			Discovery			Properties		Ref
Permanent	Provisional	Named after	Date	Site	Discoverer(s)	Category	Diam.	Ref
644901	2007 AF_{16}	—	January 10, 2007	Kitt Peak	Spacewatch	·	1.7 km	MPC · JPL
644902	2007 AT_{21}	—	January 15, 2007	Kitt Peak	Spacewatch	·	2.1 km	MPC · JPL
644903	2007 AK_{22}	—	September 3, 2005	Mauna Kea	Veillet, C.	·	3.1 km	MPC · JPL
644904	2007 AL_{24}	—	January 15, 2007	Catalina	CSS	·	3.0 km	MPC · JPL
644905	2007 AJ_{29}	—	January 15, 2007	Catalina	CSS	·	2.4 km	MPC · JPL
644906	2007 AQ_{32}	—	February 24, 2015	Haleakala	Pan-STARRS 1	·	590 m	MPC · JPL
644907	2007 AU_{32}	—	February 8, 2008	Mount Lemmon	Mount Lemmon Survey	·	1.1 km	MPC · JPL
644908	2007 AW_{32}	—	July 6, 2005	Kitt Peak	Spacewatch	THM	2.1 km	MPC · JPL
644909	2007 AG_{34}	—	December 23, 2012	Haleakala	Pan-STARRS 1	·	2.4 km	MPC · JPL
644910	2007 AV_{34}	—	March 14, 2016	Mount Lemmon	Mount Lemmon Survey	·	1.3 km	MPC · JPL
644911	2007 AW_{35}	—	January 10, 2007	Mount Lemmon	Mount Lemmon Survey	·	2.5 km	MPC · JPL
644912	2007 AK_{37}	—	January 10, 2007	Mount Lemmon	Mount Lemmon Survey	·	1.2 km	MPC · JPL
644913	2007 AD_{38}	—	January 10, 2007	Kitt Peak	Spacewatch	·	2.6 km	MPC · JPL
644914	2007 BD_{9}	—	December 13, 2006	Mount Lemmon	Mount Lemmon Survey	·	870 m	MPC · JPL
644915	2007 BO_{9}	—	January 17, 2007	Kitt Peak	Spacewatch	·	1.2 km	MPC · JPL
644916	2007 BX_{9}	—	January 17, 2007	Kitt Peak	Spacewatch	·	510 m	MPC · JPL
644917	2007 BD_{16}	—	October 1, 2005	Catalina	CSS	·	1.7 km	MPC · JPL
644918	2007 BX_{21}	—	January 17, 2007	Kitt Peak	Spacewatch	·	1.4 km	MPC · JPL
644919	2007 BR_{22}	—	January 24, 2007	Mount Lemmon	Mount Lemmon Survey	·	2.9 km	MPC · JPL
644920	2007 BQ_{26}	—	January 24, 2007	Mount Lemmon	Mount Lemmon Survey	·	650 m	MPC · JPL
644921	2007 BZ_{29}	—	November 20, 2006	Mount Lemmon	Mount Lemmon Survey	·	1.1 km	MPC · JPL
644922	2007 BS_{30}	—	January 17, 2007	Mauna Kea	D. D. Balam, K. M. Perrett	·	2.5 km	MPC · JPL
644923	2007 BZ_{30}	—	January 20, 2007	Mauna Kea	D. D. Balam, K. M. Perrett	(1547)	1.2 km	MPC · JPL
644924	2007 BP_{35}	—	January 24, 2007	Mount Lemmon	Mount Lemmon Survey	·	1.8 km	MPC · JPL
644925	2007 BF_{37}	—	January 24, 2007	Mount Lemmon	Mount Lemmon Survey	HNS	1.1 km	MPC · JPL
644926	2007 BJ_{37}	—	January 24, 2007	Mount Lemmon	Mount Lemmon Survey	·	1.3 km	MPC · JPL
644927	2007 BT_{37}	—	January 24, 2007	Mount Lemmon	Mount Lemmon Survey	·	1.4 km	MPC · JPL
644928	2007 BS_{39}	—	January 24, 2007	Mount Lemmon	Mount Lemmon Survey	·	1.5 km	MPC · JPL
644929	2007 BD_{41}	—	January 24, 2007	Mount Lemmon	Mount Lemmon Survey	·	1.1 km	MPC · JPL
644930	2007 BH_{41}	—	December 21, 2006	Mount Lemmon	Mount Lemmon Survey	·	2.5 km	MPC · JPL
644931	2007 BB_{43}	—	January 24, 2007	Mount Lemmon	Mount Lemmon Survey	·	1.3 km	MPC · JPL
644932	2007 BR_{43}	—	January 17, 2007	Kitt Peak	Spacewatch	·	600 m	MPC · JPL
644933	2007 BD_{45}	—	January 25, 2007	Kitt Peak	Spacewatch	·	580 m	MPC · JPL
644934	2007 BN_{45}	—	January 25, 2007	Kitt Peak	Spacewatch	·	1.9 km	MPC · JPL
644935	2007 BG_{46}	—	March 26, 2003	Kitt Peak	Spacewatch	·	1.0 km	MPC · JPL
644936	2007 BP_{49}	—	January 24, 2007	Mount Lemmon	Mount Lemmon Survey	·	970 m	MPC · JPL
644937	2007 BL_{50}	—	January 8, 2007	Mount Lemmon	Mount Lemmon Survey	·	2.8 km	MPC · JPL
644938	2007 BD_{51}	—	January 24, 2007	Kitt Peak	Spacewatch	·	2.5 km	MPC · JPL
644939	2007 BQ_{52}	—	January 24, 2007	Kitt Peak	Spacewatch	·	1.1 km	MPC · JPL
644940	2007 BH_{54}	—	December 27, 2006	Mount Lemmon	Mount Lemmon Survey	·	2.7 km	MPC · JPL
644941	2007 BF_{58}	—	January 17, 2007	Kitt Peak	Spacewatch	·	1.1 km	MPC · JPL
644942	2007 BW_{60}	—	December 25, 2006	Kitt Peak	Spacewatch	EUP	3.4 km	MPC · JPL
644943	2007 BF_{62}	—	January 27, 2007	Mount Lemmon	Mount Lemmon Survey	HNS	890 m	MPC · JPL
644944	2007 BL_{62}	—	January 27, 2007	Mount Lemmon	Mount Lemmon Survey	·	1.5 km	MPC · JPL
644945	2007 BX_{62}	—	January 27, 2007	Mount Lemmon	Mount Lemmon Survey	·	2.1 km	MPC · JPL
644946	2007 BN_{63}	—	January 27, 2007	Kitt Peak	Spacewatch	·	2.4 km	MPC · JPL
644947	2007 BX_{63}	—	December 27, 2006	Mount Lemmon	Mount Lemmon Survey	·	1.3 km	MPC · JPL
644948	2007 BR_{65}	—	January 27, 2007	Mount Lemmon	Mount Lemmon Survey	·	1.2 km	MPC · JPL
644949	2007 BR_{70}	—	January 10, 2007	Kitt Peak	Spacewatch	EOS	1.5 km	MPC · JPL
644950	2007 BS_{71}	—	December 16, 2006	Mount Lemmon	Mount Lemmon Survey	·	2.0 km	MPC · JPL
644951	2007 BV_{72}	—	January 24, 2007	Mount Nyukasa	Japan Aerospace Exploration Agency	·	1.3 km	MPC · JPL
644952	2007 BG_{77}	—	January 16, 2007	Catalina	CSS	·	1.6 km	MPC · JPL
644953	2007 BK_{84}	—	March 31, 2008	Mount Lemmon	Mount Lemmon Survey	·	1.4 km	MPC · JPL
644954	2007 BL_{87}	—	April 5, 2003	Kitt Peak	Spacewatch	·	1.4 km	MPC · JPL
644955	2007 BO_{87}	—	January 25, 2007	Kitt Peak	Spacewatch	·	2.5 km	MPC · JPL
644956	2007 BF_{89}	—	January 17, 2007	Kitt Peak	Spacewatch	·	550 m	MPC · JPL
644957	2007 BP_{95}	—	January 19, 2007	Mauna Kea	P. A. Wiegert	·	1.0 km	MPC · JPL
644958	2007 BS_{97}	—	January 19, 2007	Mauna Kea	P. A. Wiegert	·	560 m	MPC · JPL
644959	2007 BT_{98}	—	January 19, 2007	Mauna Kea	P. A. Wiegert	·	2.3 km	MPC · JPL
644960	2007 BH_{99}	—	January 27, 2007	Mount Lemmon	Mount Lemmon Survey	·	1.3 km	MPC · JPL
644961	2007 BD_{102}	—	January 18, 2007	Palomar	NEAT	·	1.2 km	MPC · JPL
644962	2007 BE_{102}	—	December 21, 2006	Kitt Peak	L. H. Wasserman, M. W. Buie	·	1.4 km	MPC · JPL
644963	2007 BC_{103}	—	January 27, 2007	Kitt Peak	Spacewatch	·	2.6 km	MPC · JPL
644964	2007 BM_{104}	—	May 7, 2014	Haleakala	Pan-STARRS 1	·	2.5 km	MPC · JPL
644965	2007 BG_{105}	—	February 6, 2013	Kitt Peak	Spacewatch	·	2.5 km	MPC · JPL
644966	2007 BQ_{105}	—	November 5, 2016	Haleakala	Pan-STARRS 1	·	2.2 km	MPC · JPL
644967	2007 BX_{105}	—	January 9, 2007	Kitt Peak	Spacewatch	·	2.4 km	MPC · JPL
644968	2007 BQ_{106}	—	January 24, 2007	Mount Lemmon	Mount Lemmon Survey	·	1.9 km	MPC · JPL
644969	2007 BT_{106}	—	January 25, 2007	Kitt Peak	Spacewatch	·	2.0 km	MPC · JPL
644970	2007 BA_{107}	—	January 27, 2007	Mount Lemmon	Mount Lemmon Survey	·	2.2 km	MPC · JPL
644971	2007 BV_{107}	—	March 29, 2012	Haleakala	Pan-STARRS 1	·	1.4 km	MPC · JPL
644972	2007 BF_{108}	—	January 17, 2007	Kitt Peak	Spacewatch	·	570 m	MPC · JPL
644973	2007 BH_{108}	—	January 24, 2007	Mount Lemmon	Mount Lemmon Survey	·	450 m	MPC · JPL
644974	2007 BB_{109}	—	January 27, 2007	Mount Lemmon	Mount Lemmon Survey	·	610 m	MPC · JPL
644975	2007 BR_{109}	—	March 17, 2018	Mount Lemmon	Mount Lemmon Survey	V	510 m	MPC · JPL
644976	2007 BB_{110}	—	July 24, 2015	Haleakala	Pan-STARRS 1	·	530 m	MPC · JPL
644977	2007 BC_{110}	—	July 25, 2015	Haleakala	Pan-STARRS 1	(895)	3.3 km	MPC · JPL
644978	2007 BG_{110}	—	October 28, 2014	Haleakala	Pan-STARRS 1	·	1.2 km	MPC · JPL
644979	2007 BB_{111}	—	November 17, 2014	Haleakala	Pan-STARRS 1	·	900 m	MPC · JPL
644980	2007 BF_{111}	—	December 14, 2017	Mount Lemmon	Mount Lemmon Survey	·	2.8 km	MPC · JPL
644981	2007 BT_{111}	—	January 17, 2007	Kitt Peak	Spacewatch	·	630 m	MPC · JPL
644982	2007 BG_{112}	—	January 27, 2007	Kitt Peak	Spacewatch	EUP	2.9 km	MPC · JPL
644983	2007 BB_{113}	—	January 27, 2007	Kitt Peak	Spacewatch	ELF	2.8 km	MPC · JPL
644984	2007 BQ_{113}	—	January 24, 2007	Mount Lemmon	Mount Lemmon Survey	·	2.1 km	MPC · JPL
644985	2007 BK_{114}	—	January 27, 2007	Kitt Peak	Spacewatch	·	1.1 km	MPC · JPL
644986	2007 BN_{114}	—	January 27, 2007	Mount Lemmon	Mount Lemmon Survey	·	2.3 km	MPC · JPL
644987	2007 BP_{114}	—	January 29, 2007	Kitt Peak	Spacewatch	·	1.6 km	MPC · JPL
644988	2007 BA_{118}	—	January 17, 2007	Kitt Peak	Spacewatch	·	670 m	MPC · JPL
644989	2007 BO_{119}	—	January 27, 2007	Mount Lemmon	Mount Lemmon Survey	·	2.0 km	MPC · JPL
644990	2007 BT_{119}	—	January 27, 2007	Mount Lemmon	Mount Lemmon Survey	·	580 m	MPC · JPL
644991	2007 CS_{2}	—	February 6, 2007	Kitt Peak	Spacewatch	JUN	1.1 km	MPC · JPL
644992	2007 CJ_{3}	—	February 10, 1996	Kitt Peak	Spacewatch	·	2.5 km	MPC · JPL
644993	2007 CZ_{3}	—	January 28, 2007	Mount Lemmon	Mount Lemmon Survey	JUN	780 m	MPC · JPL
644994	2007 CW_{7}	—	February 6, 2007	Kitt Peak	Spacewatch	·	2.8 km	MPC · JPL
644995	2007 CG_{12}	—	January 17, 2007	Kitt Peak	Spacewatch	·	1.3 km	MPC · JPL
644996	2007 CN_{16}	—	December 14, 2006	Kitt Peak	Spacewatch	EUN	890 m	MPC · JPL
644997	2007 CS_{18}	—	September 29, 2005	Mount Lemmon	Mount Lemmon Survey	·	2.0 km	MPC · JPL
644998	2007 CD_{24}	—	February 8, 2007	Kitt Peak	Spacewatch	·	2.0 km	MPC · JPL
644999	2007 CJ_{24}	—	October 1, 2005	Catalina	CSS	·	1.9 km	MPC · JPL
645000	2007 CJ_{27}	—	February 8, 1999	Mauna Kea	Anderson, J., Veillet, C.	·	1.3 km	MPC · JPL

back to top
