= 20488 Pic-du-Midi =

Main-belt asteroid

Discovery
- Discovered by: Pises Obs.
- Discovery site: Pises Obs.
- Discovery date: 17 July 1999

Designations
- Named after: Pic du Midi Observatory (in the French Pyrenees)
- Alternative designations: 1999 OL · 1998 HD_{60}
- Minor planet category: main-belt · (middle) background

Orbital characteristics
- Epoch 4 September 2017 (JD 2458000.5)
- Uncertainty parameter 0
- Observation arc: 19.28 yr (7,041 days)
- Aphelion: 3.1496 AU
- Perihelion: 2.3196 AU
- Semi-major axis: 2.7346 AU
- Eccentricity: 0.1518
- Orbital period (sidereal): 4.52 yr (1,652 days)
- Mean anomaly: 342.51°
- Mean motion: 0° 13^{m} 4.8^{s} / day
- Inclination: 7.0346°
- Longitude of ascending node: 345.85°
- Argument of perihelion: 354.85°

Physical characteristics
- Mean diameter: 6.64 km (calculated); 7.894±0.199 km
- Synodic rotation period: 2.812±0.0004 h
- Geometric albedo: 0.057 (assumed); 0.059±0.013
- Spectral type: C (assumed)
- Absolute magnitude (H): 14.167±0.002 (R) · 14.2 · 14.62

20488 Pic-du-Midi (provisional designation 1999 OL) is a background asteroid from the middle region of the asteroid belt, approximately 7 kilometers in diameter. It was discovered on 17 July 1999, by astronomers at Pises Observatory in southern France. The asteroid was named for the Pic du Midi Observatory.

== Orbit and classification ==
Pic-du-Midi is a non-family from the main belt's background population. It orbits the Sun in the central main-belt at a distance of 2.3–3.1 AU once every 4 years and 6 months (1,652 days). Its orbit has an eccentricity of 0.15 and an inclination of 7° with respect to the ecliptic. The first precovery was taken by Spacewatch at Kitt Peak in 1997, extending the body's observation arc by more than 2 years prior to its official discovery observation at Pises.

== Physical characteristics ==
=== Rotation period ===
In September 2013, a photometric lightcurve of Pic-du-Midi was obtained at the Palomar Transient Factory in California. Lightcurve analysis gave a rotation period of 2.812 hours with a brightness variation of 0.14 in magnitude (U=2). For an asteroid of its size, Pic-du-Midi has a relatively fast spin rate, not significantly above the 2.2-hour threshold for the so-called fast rotators.

=== Diameter and albedo ===
According to the survey carried out by NASA's Wide-field Infrared Survey Explorer with its subsequent NEOWISE mission, Pic-du-Midi measures 7.894 kilometers in diameter, and its surface has an albedo of 0.059, while the Collaborative Asteroid Lightcurve Link assumes a standard albedo for carbonaceous asteroids of 0.057 and calculates a diameter of 6.64 kilometers based on an absolute magnitude of 12.62.

== Naming ==
This minor planet was named after the Pic du Midi Observatory located on the Pyrenees mountains in southern France. Founded by the Ramond Society in 1881, the observatory pioneered the study of the solar corona and cosmic rays and was one of the first to use high-resolution techniques. The approved naming citation was published by the Minor Planet Center on 9 March 2001 (M.P.C. 42368).
