= Pises Observatory =

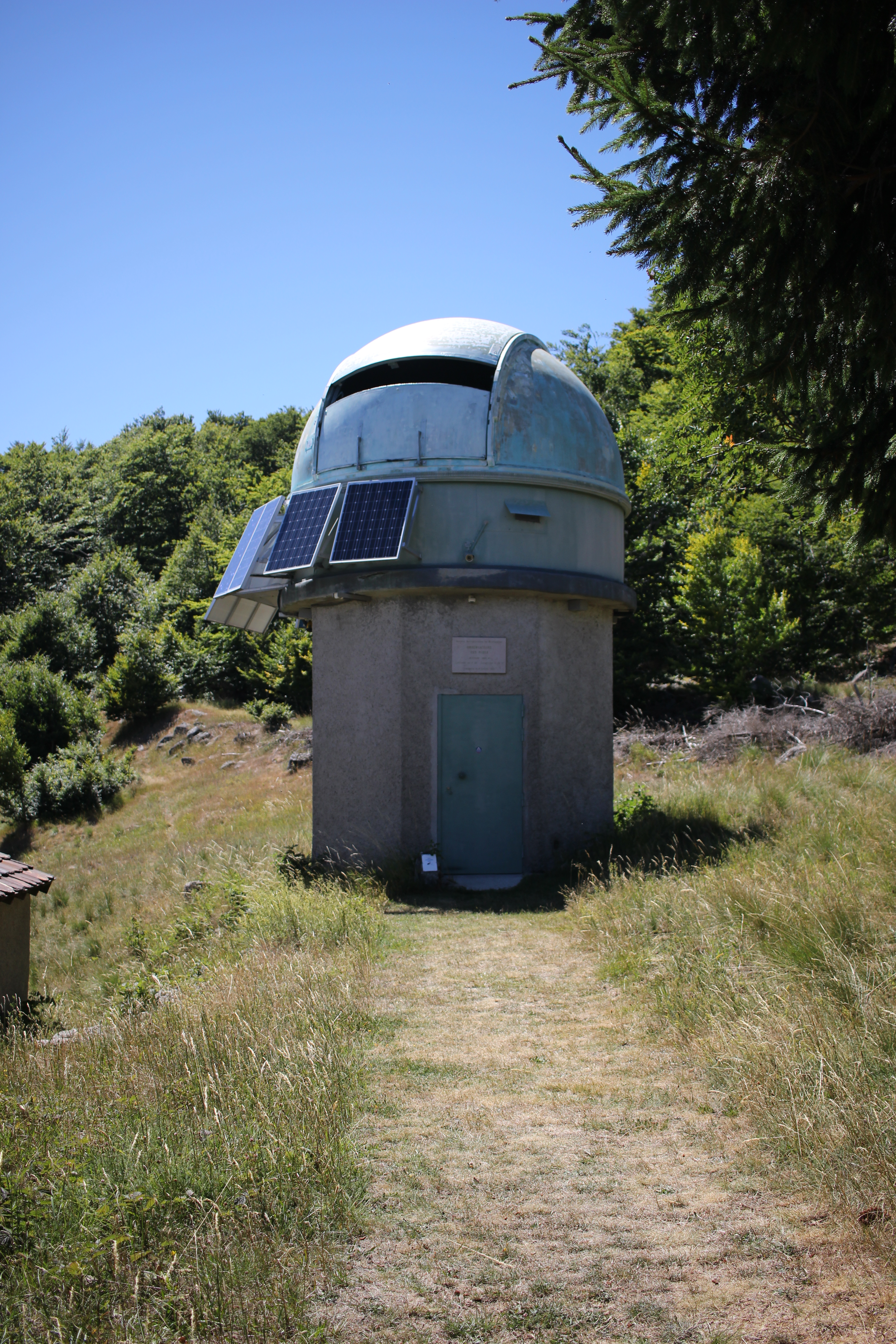
- Organization: Société Astronomique de Montpellier
- Observatory code: 122
- Location: Parc National des Cévennes, France
- Coordinates: 44°02′22″N 3°30′13″E
- Altitude: 1,300 m (4,300 ft)
- Established: 1985
- Website: pisesobservatoire.free.fr

Pises Observatory is an astronomical observatory at the Parc National des Cévennes in France. It is situated at 1,300 m (4,300 ft) altitude and houses an optical telescope with a charge-coupled device used for asteroid surveys.

Minor planets discovered: 41
see § List of discovered minor planets

== List of discovered minor planets ==
16900 Lozère	27 February 1998	list
18623 Pises	27 February 1998	list
20488 Pic-du-Midi	17 July 1999	list
24948 Babote	9 July 1997	list
26210 Lingas	6 September 1997	list
31110 Clapas	13 August 1997	list
31192 Aigoual	29 December 1997	list
33746 Sombart	17 July 1999	list
38237 Roche	16 July 1999	list
44001 Jonquet	6 September 1997	list
46719 Plantade	1 August 1997	list
52589 Montviloff	12 August 1997	list
59793 Clapiès	16 July 1999	list
72876 Vauriot	20 May 2001	list
82926 Jacquey	25 August 2001	list

86043 Cévennes	16 July 1999	list
91422 Giraudon	16 July 1999	list
132719 Lambey	1 August 2002	list
135069 Gagnereau	15 August 2001	list
153333 Jeanhugues	25 July 2001	list
159409 Ratte	16 July 1999	list
186007 Guilleminet	18 August 2001	list
(199949) 2007 HR_{15}	21 April 2007	list
(212483) 2006 QF_{82}	25 August 2006	list
(221767) 2007 GT_{32}	15 April 2007	list
225711 Danyzy	17 August 2001	list
(228168) 2009 SZ_{188}	21 September 2009	list
233522 Moye	18 April 2007	list
(233660) 2008 QR_{32}	27 August 2008	list
(257195) 2008 QY_{41}	29 August 2008	list

(269700) 1997 PZ_{3}	12 August 1997	list
(278625) 2008 QC_{40}	27 August 2008	list
295472 Puy	26 August 2008	list
(300258) 2007 HT_{4}	18 April 2007	list
(304195) 2006 QG_{82}	25 August 2006	list
333636 Reboul	26 August 2008	list
(335798) 2007 HM_{15}	19 April 2007	list
(346303) 2008 QZ_{6}	25 August 2008	list
(353549) 2011 SR_{188}	24 August 2006	list
361183 Tandon	24 August 2006	list
435552 Morin	27 August 2008	list

== See also ==
- List of asteroid-discovering observatories
- List of astronomical observatories
- List of minor planet discoverers § Discovering dedicated institutions
