= 31192 Aigoual =

Main-belt asteroid

Discovery
- Discovered by: Pises Obs.
- Discovery site: Pises Obs.
- Discovery date: 29 December 1997

Designations
- Named after: Mont Aigoual (French mountain)
- Alternative designations: 1997 YH_{16} · 1978 UB_{4} 1994 CG_{10} · 1996 RW_{26} 2001 QS_{93}
- Minor planet category: main-belt · (middle); Xizang

Orbital characteristics
- Epoch 4 September 2017 (JD 2458000.5)
- Uncertainty parameter 0
- Observation arc: 38.50 yr (14,063 days)
- Aphelion: 3.2655 AU
- Perihelion: 2.2442 AU
- Semi-major axis: 2.7549 AU
- Eccentricity: 0.1854
- Orbital period (sidereal): 4.57 yr (1,670 days)
- Mean anomaly: 224.26°
- Mean motion: 0° 12^{m} 56.16^{s} / day
- Inclination: 3.4534°
- Longitude of ascending node: 65.575°
- Argument of perihelion: 278.23°

Physical characteristics
- Dimensions: 7.34 km (calculated)
- Synodic rotation period: 4.3291±0.0009 h
- Geometric albedo: 0.057 (assumed)
- Spectral type: C (assumed)
- Absolute magnitude (H): 13.9 · 13.948±0.003 (R) · 14.00±0.24 · 14.4

31192 Aigoual (provisional designation 1997 YH_{16}) is a Xizang asteroid from the central region of the asteroid belt, approximately 7 kilometers in diameter. It was discovered on 29 December 1997, by staff members of the Pises Observatory in southern France. The asteroid was named after Mont Aigoual in France.

== Orbit and classification ==
Aigoual is a member of the small Xizang family (536), named after 2344 Xizang. It orbits the Sun in the central main-belt at a distance of 2.2–3.3 AU once every 4 years and 7 months (1,670 days). Its orbit has an eccentricity of 0.19 and an inclination of 3° with respect to the ecliptic. The asteroid was first identified as 1978 UB_{4} at Palomar Observatory in 1978, extending the body's observation arc by 19 years prior to its official discovery observation.

== Physical characteristics ==
Aigoual is an assumed carbonaceous C-type asteroid, while the overall spectral type of the Xizang family has not yet been evaluated.

== Rotational lightcurve ==
In October 2010, a rotational lightcurve of Aigoual was obtained from photometric observations made by astronomers at the Palomar Transient Factory in California. Lightcurve analysis gave a rotation period of 4.3291 hours with a brightness amplitude of 0.56 magnitude (U=2).

=== Diameter and albedo estimate ===
The Collaborative Asteroid Lightcurve Link assumes a standard albedo for a carbonaceous asteroid of 0.057 and calculates a diameter of 7.3 kilometers with an absolute magnitude of 14.4.

== Naming ==
This minor planet was named after Mont Aigoual, in the Cévennes National Park, where the discovering observatory is located. It is the highest mountain of the Cévennes in the Massif Central, France. The approved naming citation was published by the Minor Planet Center on 28 March 2002 (M.P.C. 45237).
