= Pagel =

Pagel is a surname and it may refer to:

- Bernard Pagel, British astrophysicist
- Christina Pagel, British-German mathematician
- Dave Pagel, American politician
- David Pagel, American an art critic
- Derek Pagel, American football player
- Garry Pagel, South African rugby player
- Julius Leopold Pagel, German physician and historian of medicine
- Karl Pagel, American baseball player
- Mark Pagel, evolutionary biologist
- Mike Pagel, American football player
- Peter Pagel, German footballer
- Ramona Pagel, American shot putter
- Walter Pagel, German pathologist

== See also ==
- Pagels, a surname
