= Meanings of minor-planet names: 135001–136000 =

As minor planet discoveries are confirmed, they are given a permanent number by the IAU's Minor Planet Center (MPC), and the discoverers can then submit names for them, following the IAU's naming conventions. The list below concerns those minor planets in the specified number-range that have received names, and explains the meanings of those names.

Official naming citations of newly named small Solar System bodies are approved and published in a bulletin by IAU's Working Group for Small Bodies Nomenclature (WGSBN). Before May 2021, citations were published in MPC's Minor Planet Circulars for many decades. Recent citations can also be found on the JPL Small-Body Database (SBDB). Until his death in 2016, German astronomer Lutz D. Schmadel compiled these citations into the Dictionary of Minor Planet Names (DMP) and regularly updated the collection.

Based on Paul Herget's The Names of the Minor Planets, Schmadel also researched the unclear origin of numerous asteroids, most of which had been named prior to World War II. This article incorporates text from this source, which is in the public domain: SBDB New namings may only be added to this list below after official publication as the preannouncement of names is condemned. The WGSBN publishes a comprehensive guideline for the naming rules of non-cometary small Solar System bodies.

== 135001–135100 ==
Named minor planet	Provisional	This minor planet was named for...	Ref; Catalog
135041 Lorenzofranco	2001 OU_{12}	Lorenzo Franco (b. 1954), an Italian amateur astronomer.	IAU · 135041
135069 Gagnereau	2001 PV_{28}	Éric Gagnereau (born 1955), French animator and popularizer of astronomy, co-founder of the Astronomical Society of Montpellier and of the Pises Observatory	JPL · 135069

== 135101–135200 ==
back to top

Named minor planet	Provisional	This minor planet was named for...	Ref; Catalog
There are no named minor planets in this number range

== 135201–135300 ==
back to top

Named minor planet	Provisional	This minor planet was named for...	Ref; Catalog
135268 Haigneré	2001 SX_{115}	Claudie Haigneré (born 1957) and Jean-Pierre Haigneré (born 1948), French astronauts. Claudie was born in Le Creusot, location of the Le Creusot Observatory (504) where this minor planet was discovered.	JPL · 135268

== 135301–135400 ==
back to top

Named minor planet	Provisional	This minor planet was named for...	Ref; Catalog
There are no named minor planets in this number range

== 135401–135500 ==
back to top

Named minor planet	Provisional	This minor planet was named for...	Ref; Catalog
There are no named minor planets in this number range

== 135501–135600 ==
back to top

Named minor planet	Provisional	This minor planet was named for...	Ref; Catalog
135561 Tautvaišienė	2002 FK_{5}	Gražina Tautvaišienė (born 1958), Lithuanian astronomer, director of the Institute of Theoretical Physics and Astronomy in Vilnius since 2003	JPL · 135561

== 135601–135700 ==
back to top

Named minor planet	Provisional	This minor planet was named for...	Ref; Catalog
135662 Michelacastello	2002 MA_{1}	Michela Castello, Italian amateur astronomer.	IAU · 135662
135695 Dragomirescu	2002 PK	Cristina Dragomirescu, Romanian mathematician.	IAU · 135695

== 135701–135800 ==
back to top

Named minor planet	Provisional	This minor planet was named for...	Ref; Catalog
135799 Ráczmiklós	2002 RZ_{111}	Miklós Rácz (born 1947), a Hungarian physicist, the head of the technical department of the Konkoly Observatory between 2000 and 2011.	JPL · 135799

== 135801–135900 ==
back to top

Named minor planet	Provisional	This minor planet was named for...	Ref; Catalog
135889 Trisdalcanton	2002 TN_{61}	Tristano Dal Canton, Italian electronics and telecommunications engineer. Serving as Hardware Manager at a major electronics firm, he leads the research and development of novel food-preservation technologies. Tristano enjoys mountain hiking and film making, and he appeared as an extra in the TV series Don Matteo.	IAU · 135889
135890 Robertodalzotto	2002 TF_{63}	Roberto Dal Zotto, Italian freelance web developer. His leisure passions include martial arts, the thrill of extreme sports, and a love of hiking.	IAU · 135890

== 135901–136000 ==
back to top

Named minor planet	Provisional	This minor planet was named for...	Ref; Catalog
135910 Umbertorepetti	2002 TZ_{110}	Umberto Repetti, Italian science communicator.	IAU · 135910
135978 Agüeros	2002 TD_{304}	Marcel Agüeros (born 1973), French-Puerto Rican astronomer with the Sloan Digital Sky Survey	JPL · 135978
135979 Allam	2002 TZ_{368}	Sahar Allam (born 1964), Egyptian astronomer with the Sloan Digital Sky Survey	JPL · 135979
135980 Scottanderson	2002 TG_{369}	Scott F. Anderson (born 1955), American astronomer with the Sloan Digital Sky Survey	JPL · 135980
135991 Danarmstrong	2002 UY_{35}	Daniel Armstrong (born 1944) received a BS in Mechanical Engineering from the University of Wisconsin in 1967. In the early 1980s, before CCD sensors were available to amateurs, Armstrong began a nearly decade-long visual observation program directed at minor planet paths and occultation events.	JPL · 135991

back to top

Preceded by 134,001–135,000	Meanings of minor-planet names List of minor planets: 135,001–136,000	Succeeded by 136,001–137,000
