= List of minor planets: 135001–136000 =

The following is a partial list of minor planets, running from minor-planet number 135001 through 136000, inclusive. The primary data for this and other partial lists is based on JPL's "Small-Body Orbital Elements" and data available from the Minor Planet Center. Critical list information is also provided by the MPC, unless otherwise specified from Lowell Observatory. A detailed description of the table's columns and additional sources are given on the main page including a complete list of every page in this series, and a statistical break-up on the dynamical classification of minor planets.

Also see the summary list of all named bodies in numerical and alphabetical order, and the corresponding naming citations for the number range of this particular list. New namings may only be added to this list after official publication, as the preannouncement of names is condemned by the Working Group for Small Bodies Nomenclature of the International Astronomical Union.

Near-Earth obj.	MBA (inner)	MBA (outer)	Centaur
Mars-crosser	MBA (middle)	Jupiter trojan	Trans-Neptunian obj.
Unclassified

== 135001–135100 ==
Designation			Discovery			Properties		Ref
Permanent	Provisional	Named after	Date	Site	Discoverer(s)	Category	Diam.	Ref
135001	2001 HR_{21}	—	April 23, 2001	Socorro	LINEAR	·	990 m	MPC · JPL
135002	2001 HU_{27}	—	April 27, 2001	Socorro	LINEAR	·	2.6 km	MPC · JPL
135003	2001 HQ_{45}	—	April 17, 2001	Anderson Mesa	LONEOS	·	7.0 km	MPC · JPL
135004	2001 HZ_{45}	—	April 17, 2001	Anderson Mesa	LONEOS	RAF · fast	1.9 km	MPC · JPL
135005	2001 HC_{54}	—	April 24, 2001	Anderson Mesa	LONEOS	H	860 m	MPC · JPL
135006	2001 HB_{58}	—	April 25, 2001	Anderson Mesa	LONEOS	·	3.1 km	MPC · JPL
135007	2001 HF_{58}	—	April 25, 2001	Anderson Mesa	LONEOS	EUN	2.0 km	MPC · JPL
135008	2001 JB	—	May 2, 2001	Reedy Creek	J. Broughton	·	3.3 km	MPC · JPL
135009	2001 JQ_{2}	—	May 15, 2001	Kitt Peak	Spacewatch	RAF	1.4 km	MPC · JPL
135010	2001 JA_{9}	—	May 15, 2001	Palomar	NEAT	·	2.8 km	MPC · JPL
135011	2001 KR_{12}	—	May 18, 2001	Socorro	LINEAR	·	4.4 km	MPC · JPL
135012	2001 KX_{12}	—	May 18, 2001	Socorro	LINEAR	·	4.0 km	MPC · JPL
135013	2001 KY_{16}	—	May 18, 2001	Socorro	LINEAR	·	3.6 km	MPC · JPL
135014	2001 KZ_{25}	—	May 17, 2001	Socorro	LINEAR	MAS	1.8 km	MPC · JPL
135015	2001 KU_{36}	—	May 21, 2001	Socorro	LINEAR	·	2.6 km	MPC · JPL
135016	2001 KD_{41}	—	May 23, 2001	Socorro	LINEAR	·	3.8 km	MPC · JPL
135017	2001 KC_{44}	—	May 22, 2001	Socorro	LINEAR	·	2.7 km	MPC · JPL
135018	2001 KZ_{44}	—	May 22, 2001	Socorro	LINEAR	GEF	2.5 km	MPC · JPL
135019	2001 KE_{46}	—	May 22, 2001	Socorro	LINEAR	·	2.0 km	MPC · JPL
135020	2001 KA_{50}	—	May 24, 2001	Socorro	LINEAR	·	4.4 km	MPC · JPL
135021	2001 KB_{55}	—	May 26, 2001	Kitt Peak	Spacewatch	(5)	1.4 km	MPC · JPL
135022	2001 KK_{65}	—	May 22, 2001	Anderson Mesa	LONEOS	EUN	4.1 km	MPC · JPL
135023	2001 KL_{75}	—	May 31, 2001	Palomar	NEAT	·	2.9 km	MPC · JPL
135024	2001 KO_{76}	—	May 23, 2001	Cerro Tololo	M. W. Buie	res · 4:7	150 km	MPC · JPL
135025	2001 LW_{5}	—	June 12, 2001	Kitt Peak	Spacewatch	·	1.8 km	MPC · JPL
135026	2001 LW_{12}	—	June 15, 2001	Socorro	LINEAR	TIN	2.5 km	MPC · JPL
135027	2001 LZ_{13}	—	June 15, 2001	Socorro	LINEAR	·	5.8 km	MPC · JPL
135028	2001 MH_{4}	—	June 21, 2001	Socorro	LINEAR	·	4.4 km	MPC · JPL
135029	2001 MC_{8}	—	June 20, 2001	Haleakala	NEAT	·	3.9 km	MPC · JPL
135030	2001 ME_{10}	—	June 24, 2001	Desert Beaver	W. K. Y. Yeung	·	1.2 km	MPC · JPL
135031	2001 ME_{20}	—	June 25, 2001	Palomar	NEAT	WAT	4.8 km	MPC · JPL
135032	2001 ME_{27}	—	June 20, 2001	Anderson Mesa	LONEOS	·	7.4 km	MPC · JPL
135033	2001 MH_{29}	—	June 27, 2001	Anderson Mesa	LONEOS	·	2.2 km	MPC · JPL
135034	2001 MM_{30}	—	June 21, 2001	Palomar	NEAT	·	5.0 km	MPC · JPL
135035	2001 NC_{5}	—	July 13, 2001	Palomar	NEAT	·	2.5 km	MPC · JPL
135036	2001 NF_{11}	—	July 14, 2001	Haleakala	NEAT	·	3.4 km	MPC · JPL
135037	2001 NK_{16}	—	July 14, 2001	Haleakala	NEAT	·	4.5 km	MPC · JPL
135038	2001 NS_{20}	—	July 14, 2001	Palomar	NEAT	·	4.2 km	MPC · JPL
135039	2001 OA_{2}	—	July 18, 2001	Palomar	NEAT	·	5.8 km	MPC · JPL
135040	2001 OC_{10}	—	July 19, 2001	Palomar	NEAT	·	3.6 km	MPC · JPL
135041 Lorenzofranco	2001 OU_{12}	Lorenzofranco	July 21, 2001	San Marcello	L. Tesi, M. Tombelli	·	2.2 km	MPC · JPL
135042	2001 OE_{19}	—	July 17, 2001	Haleakala	NEAT	·	2.7 km	MPC · JPL
135043	2001 OR_{23}	—	July 22, 2001	Palomar	NEAT	·	4.5 km	MPC · JPL
135044	2001 OM_{30}	—	July 19, 2001	Palomar	NEAT	·	3.9 km	MPC · JPL
135045	2001 OF_{32}	—	July 24, 2001	Lake Tekapo	I. P. Griffin, Brady, N.	·	4.8 km	MPC · JPL
135046	2001 OX_{42}	—	July 22, 2001	Palomar	NEAT	EOS	6.3 km	MPC · JPL
135047	2001 ON_{44}	—	July 23, 2001	Palomar	NEAT	·	5.6 km	MPC · JPL
135048	2001 OT_{46}	—	July 16, 2001	Anderson Mesa	LONEOS	·	3.5 km	MPC · JPL
135049	2001 OX_{53}	—	July 21, 2001	Palomar	NEAT	PHO	1.7 km	MPC · JPL
135050	2001 OK_{55}	—	July 22, 2001	Palomar	NEAT	·	3.6 km	MPC · JPL
135051	2001 OZ_{55}	—	July 22, 2001	Palomar	NEAT	·	9.5 km	MPC · JPL
135052	2001 OD_{56}	—	July 23, 2001	Palomar	NEAT	·	4.8 km	MPC · JPL
135053	2001 OJ_{59}	—	July 21, 2001	Haleakala	NEAT	·	5.0 km	MPC · JPL
135054	2001 OX_{68}	—	July 16, 2001	Haleakala	NEAT	GEF	3.0 km	MPC · JPL
135055	2001 OE_{76}	—	July 29, 2001	Palomar	NEAT	BRA	3.0 km	MPC · JPL
135056	2001 OY_{76}	—	July 25, 2001	Haleakala	NEAT	·	3.5 km	MPC · JPL
135057	2001 OR_{81}	—	July 26, 2001	Haleakala	NEAT	·	2.0 km	MPC · JPL
135058	2001 OT_{87}	—	July 30, 2001	Palomar	NEAT	TIR	5.1 km	MPC · JPL
135059	2001 OX_{89}	—	July 23, 2001	Haleakala	NEAT	DOR	6.4 km	MPC · JPL
135060	2001 ON_{101}	—	July 28, 2001	Anderson Mesa	LONEOS	·	3.4 km	MPC · JPL
135061	2001 PG_{1}	—	August 3, 2001	Haleakala	NEAT	H	680 m	MPC · JPL
135062	2001 PR_{7}	—	August 10, 2001	Palomar	NEAT	·	5.0 km	MPC · JPL
135063	2001 PB_{8}	—	August 10, 2001	Palomar	NEAT	·	3.3 km	MPC · JPL
135064	2001 PC_{13}	—	August 11, 2001	Palomar	NEAT	·	6.1 km	MPC · JPL
135065	2001 PF_{18}	—	August 9, 2001	Palomar	NEAT	·	8.0 km	MPC · JPL
135066	2001 PS_{23}	—	August 11, 2001	Haleakala	NEAT	·	4.4 km	MPC · JPL
135067	2001 PU_{24}	—	August 11, 2001	Haleakala	NEAT	·	4.0 km	MPC · JPL
135068	2001 PP_{27}	—	August 11, 2001	Haleakala	NEAT	·	4.1 km	MPC · JPL
135069 Gagnereau	2001 PV_{28}	Gagnereau	August 15, 2001	Pises	Pises	GEF	2.5 km	MPC · JPL
135070	2001 PW_{30}	—	August 10, 2001	Palomar	NEAT	EOS	4.2 km	MPC · JPL
135071	2001 PF_{32}	—	August 10, 2001	Palomar	NEAT	EOS	2.9 km	MPC · JPL
135072	2001 PA_{34}	—	August 10, 2001	Palomar	NEAT	·	3.9 km	MPC · JPL
135073	2001 PH_{40}	—	August 11, 2001	Palomar	NEAT	·	3.3 km	MPC · JPL
135074	2001 PX_{41}	—	August 11, 2001	Palomar	NEAT	·	4.7 km	MPC · JPL
135075	2001 PL_{45}	—	August 12, 2001	Palomar	NEAT	·	5.4 km	MPC · JPL
135076	2001 PC_{56}	—	August 14, 2001	Haleakala	NEAT	HOF	4.7 km	MPC · JPL
135077	2001 PE_{57}	—	August 14, 2001	Haleakala	NEAT	EOS	4.1 km	MPC · JPL
135078	2001 PB_{58}	—	August 14, 2001	Haleakala	NEAT	·	4.9 km	MPC · JPL
135079	2001 PH_{65}	—	August 11, 2001	Haleakala	NEAT	·	4.4 km	MPC · JPL
135080	2001 PP_{65}	—	August 13, 2001	Haleakala	NEAT	·	6.3 km	MPC · JPL
135081	2001 QY_{9}	—	August 16, 2001	Socorro	LINEAR	·	4.0 km	MPC · JPL
135082	2001 QV_{19}	—	August 16, 2001	Socorro	LINEAR	·	5.1 km	MPC · JPL
135083	2001 QR_{23}	—	August 16, 2001	Socorro	LINEAR	·	5.5 km	MPC · JPL
135084	2001 QL_{31}	—	August 16, 2001	Socorro	LINEAR	·	1.9 km	MPC · JPL
135085	2001 QZ_{38}	—	August 16, 2001	Socorro	LINEAR	AGN	2.6 km	MPC · JPL
135086	2001 QY_{42}	—	August 16, 2001	Socorro	LINEAR	AGN	2.3 km	MPC · JPL
135087	2001 QY_{46}	—	August 16, 2001	Socorro	LINEAR	·	3.6 km	MPC · JPL
135088	2001 QV_{57}	—	August 16, 2001	Socorro	LINEAR	EOS	3.6 km	MPC · JPL
135089	2001 QC_{60}	—	August 18, 2001	Socorro	LINEAR	·	5.5 km	MPC · JPL
135090	2001 QU_{61}	—	August 16, 2001	Socorro	LINEAR	·	6.3 km	MPC · JPL
135091	2001 QV_{62}	—	August 16, 2001	Socorro	LINEAR	·	3.7 km	MPC · JPL
135092	2001 QR_{65}	—	August 17, 2001	Socorro	LINEAR	EOS	5.0 km	MPC · JPL
135093	2001 QG_{66}	—	August 17, 2001	Socorro	LINEAR	·	7.7 km	MPC · JPL
135094	2001 QO_{69}	—	August 17, 2001	Socorro	LINEAR	EOS	5.3 km	MPC · JPL
135095	2001 QJ_{71}	—	August 16, 2001	Palomar	NEAT	·	2.4 km	MPC · JPL
135096	2001 QD_{73}	—	August 19, 2001	Socorro	LINEAR	PHO	1.6 km	MPC · JPL
135097	2001 QY_{73}	—	August 16, 2001	Socorro	LINEAR	·	2.8 km	MPC · JPL
135098	2001 QE_{78}	—	August 16, 2001	Socorro	LINEAR	·	5.8 km	MPC · JPL
135099	2001 QB_{81}	—	August 17, 2001	Socorro	LINEAR	·	8.4 km	MPC · JPL
135100	2001 QO_{81}	—	August 17, 2001	Socorro	LINEAR	EMA	7.5 km	MPC · JPL

== 135101–135200 ==
back to top

Designation			Discovery			Properties		Ref
Permanent	Provisional	Named after	Date	Site	Discoverer(s)	Category	Diam.	Ref
135101	2001 QT_{83}	—	August 17, 2001	Socorro	LINEAR	·	4.6 km	MPC · JPL
135102	2001 QJ_{84}	—	August 17, 2001	Socorro	LINEAR	·	5.7 km	MPC · JPL
135103	2001 QV_{84}	—	August 19, 2001	Socorro	LINEAR	·	4.3 km	MPC · JPL
135104	2001 QO_{90}	—	August 21, 2001	Haleakala	NEAT	·	5.2 km	MPC · JPL
135105	2001 QN_{91}	—	August 16, 2001	Socorro	LINEAR	TIR	6.2 km	MPC · JPL
135106	2001 QN_{100}	—	August 22, 2001	Haleakala	NEAT	·	7.8 km	MPC · JPL
135107	2001 QZ_{100}	—	August 19, 2001	Haleakala	NEAT	·	4.2 km	MPC · JPL
135108	2001 QS_{101}	—	August 18, 2001	Socorro	LINEAR	·	6.9 km	MPC · JPL
135109	2001 QN_{104}	—	August 21, 2001	Socorro	LINEAR	·	3.8 km	MPC · JPL
135110	2001 QP_{106}	—	August 24, 2001	Anderson Mesa	LONEOS	·	3.2 km	MPC · JPL
135111	2001 QV_{112}	—	August 25, 2001	Socorro	LINEAR	·	4.5 km	MPC · JPL
135112	2001 QW_{112}	—	August 25, 2001	Socorro	LINEAR	·	6.8 km	MPC · JPL
135113	2001 QH_{113}	—	August 25, 2001	Socorro	LINEAR	EOS	4.7 km	MPC · JPL
135114	2001 QM_{113}	—	August 25, 2001	Socorro	LINEAR	EOS	6.1 km	MPC · JPL
135115	2001 QA_{115}	—	August 17, 2001	Socorro	LINEAR	·	4.4 km	MPC · JPL
135116	2001 QD_{115}	—	August 17, 2001	Socorro	LINEAR	EOS	5.8 km	MPC · JPL
135117	2001 QK_{116}	—	August 17, 2001	Socorro	LINEAR	·	3.2 km	MPC · JPL
135118	2001 QT_{117}	—	August 17, 2001	Socorro	LINEAR	TIR	5.5 km	MPC · JPL
135119	2001 QB_{128}	—	August 20, 2001	Socorro	LINEAR	·	4.1 km	MPC · JPL
135120	2001 QP_{130}	—	August 20, 2001	Socorro	LINEAR	·	4.9 km	MPC · JPL
135121	2001 QO_{137}	—	August 22, 2001	Socorro	LINEAR	·	4.8 km	MPC · JPL
135122	2001 QH_{139}	—	August 22, 2001	Socorro	LINEAR	EOS	5.5 km	MPC · JPL
135123	2001 QE_{140}	—	August 22, 2001	Socorro	LINEAR	T_{j} (2.98)	6.0 km	MPC · JPL
135124	2001 QT_{146}	—	August 20, 2001	Palomar	NEAT	·	3.9 km	MPC · JPL
135125	2001 QP_{155}	—	August 23, 2001	Anderson Mesa	LONEOS	·	8.2 km	MPC · JPL
135126	2001 QX_{158}	—	August 23, 2001	Anderson Mesa	LONEOS	KOR	2.9 km	MPC · JPL
135127	2001 QR_{160}	—	August 23, 2001	Anderson Mesa	LONEOS	·	5.9 km	MPC · JPL
135128	2001 QW_{162}	—	August 23, 2001	Anderson Mesa	LONEOS	·	6.1 km	MPC · JPL
135129	2001 QR_{169}	—	August 22, 2001	Socorro	LINEAR	·	1.8 km	MPC · JPL
135130	2001 QA_{171}	—	August 24, 2001	Socorro	LINEAR	·	6.7 km	MPC · JPL
135131	2001 QB_{174}	—	August 26, 2001	Socorro	LINEAR	·	4.2 km	MPC · JPL
135132	2001 QJ_{177}	—	August 21, 2001	Haleakala	NEAT	615	2.4 km	MPC · JPL
135133	2001 QD_{179}	—	August 28, 2001	Palomar	NEAT	·	9.2 km	MPC · JPL
135134	2001 QE_{179}	—	August 28, 2001	Palomar	NEAT	EOS	5.2 km	MPC · JPL
135135	2001 QD_{180}	—	August 25, 2001	Palomar	NEAT	·	7.2 km	MPC · JPL
135136	2001 QT_{182}	—	August 17, 2001	Palomar	NEAT	·	4.4 km	MPC · JPL
135137	2001 QX_{182}	—	August 22, 2001	Palomar	NEAT	·	11 km	MPC · JPL
135138	2001 QY_{187}	—	August 21, 2001	Haleakala	NEAT	TIR	4.0 km	MPC · JPL
135139	2001 QD_{195}	—	August 22, 2001	Socorro	LINEAR	·	4.5 km	MPC · JPL
135140	2001 QJ_{197}	—	August 22, 2001	Palomar	NEAT	H	1.1 km	MPC · JPL
135141	2001 QH_{201}	—	August 22, 2001	Kitt Peak	Spacewatch	EOS	4.6 km	MPC · JPL
135142	2001 QU_{201}	—	August 22, 2001	Palomar	NEAT	·	6.9 km	MPC · JPL
135143	2001 QX_{204}	—	August 23, 2001	Anderson Mesa	LONEOS	·	3.2 km	MPC · JPL
135144	2001 QY_{209}	—	August 23, 2001	Anderson Mesa	LONEOS	·	3.4 km	MPC · JPL
135145	2001 QA_{211}	—	August 23, 2001	Anderson Mesa	LONEOS	EOS	4.1 km	MPC · JPL
135146	2001 QJ_{212}	—	August 23, 2001	Anderson Mesa	LONEOS	EOS	4.6 km	MPC · JPL
135147	2001 QS_{217}	—	August 23, 2001	Anderson Mesa	LONEOS	·	2.0 km	MPC · JPL
135148	2001 QT_{217}	—	August 23, 2001	Anderson Mesa	LONEOS	·	4.9 km	MPC · JPL
135149	2001 QZ_{217}	—	August 23, 2001	Anderson Mesa	LONEOS	EOS	4.4 km	MPC · JPL
135150	2001 QC_{218}	—	August 23, 2001	Anderson Mesa	LONEOS	·	5.0 km	MPC · JPL
135151	2001 QN_{219}	—	August 23, 2001	Socorro	LINEAR	·	8.5 km	MPC · JPL
135152	2001 QO_{219}	—	August 23, 2001	Socorro	LINEAR	H	840 m	MPC · JPL
135153	2001 QF_{223}	—	August 24, 2001	Anderson Mesa	LONEOS	EOS	3.2 km	MPC · JPL
135154	2001 QR_{224}	—	August 24, 2001	Socorro	LINEAR	GEF	2.9 km	MPC · JPL
135155	2001 QK_{225}	—	August 24, 2001	Anderson Mesa	LONEOS	EOS	3.5 km	MPC · JPL
135156	2001 QS_{229}	—	August 24, 2001	Anderson Mesa	LONEOS	·	4.3 km	MPC · JPL
135157	2001 QO_{230}	—	August 24, 2001	Anderson Mesa	LONEOS	·	1.8 km	MPC · JPL
135158	2001 QQ_{232}	—	August 24, 2001	Socorro	LINEAR	·	3.3 km	MPC · JPL
135159	2001 QG_{235}	—	August 24, 2001	Socorro	LINEAR	·	1.7 km	MPC · JPL
135160	2001 QL_{241}	—	August 24, 2001	Socorro	LINEAR	·	3.4 km	MPC · JPL
135161	2001 QN_{241}	—	August 24, 2001	Socorro	LINEAR	EOS	5.4 km	MPC · JPL
135162	2001 QW_{243}	—	August 24, 2001	Kitt Peak	Spacewatch	EOS	4.9 km	MPC · JPL
135163	2001 QP_{244}	—	August 24, 2001	Socorro	LINEAR	·	5.4 km	MPC · JPL
135164	2001 QH_{248}	—	August 24, 2001	Socorro	LINEAR	·	8.5 km	MPC · JPL
135165	2001 QT_{249}	—	August 24, 2001	Haleakala	NEAT	EOS	3.5 km	MPC · JPL
135166	2001 QP_{252}	—	August 25, 2001	Socorro	LINEAR	·	6.4 km	MPC · JPL
135167	2001 QZ_{252}	—	August 25, 2001	Socorro	LINEAR	·	6.1 km	MPC · JPL
135168	2001 QA_{253}	—	August 25, 2001	Socorro	LINEAR	TEL	2.5 km	MPC · JPL
135169	2001 QQ_{255}	—	August 25, 2001	Socorro	LINEAR	·	5.7 km	MPC · JPL
135170	2001 QL_{262}	—	August 25, 2001	Socorro	LINEAR	·	4.6 km	MPC · JPL
135171	2001 QX_{262}	—	August 25, 2001	Kitt Peak	Spacewatch	EOS	3.2 km	MPC · JPL
135172	2001 QL_{265}	—	August 26, 2001	Anderson Mesa	LONEOS	·	5.9 km	MPC · JPL
135173	2001 QN_{267}	—	August 20, 2001	Palomar	NEAT	H	1.4 km	MPC · JPL
135174	2001 QC_{270}	—	August 19, 2001	Socorro	LINEAR	·	3.4 km	MPC · JPL
135175	2001 QP_{270}	—	August 19, 2001	Socorro	LINEAR	PAD	3.3 km	MPC · JPL
135176	2001 QG_{278}	—	August 19, 2001	Socorro	LINEAR	·	3.1 km	MPC · JPL
135177	2001 QT_{278}	—	August 19, 2001	Socorro	LINEAR	·	5.4 km	MPC · JPL
135178	2001 QL_{282}	—	August 19, 2001	Socorro	LINEAR	EUP	6.4 km	MPC · JPL
135179	2001 QV_{282}	—	August 19, 2001	Haleakala	NEAT	EOS	4.4 km	MPC · JPL
135180	2001 QT_{291}	—	August 16, 2001	Socorro	LINEAR	·	3.5 km	MPC · JPL
135181	2001 QJ_{295}	—	August 24, 2001	Socorro	LINEAR	·	2.4 km	MPC · JPL
135182	2001 QT_{322}	—	August 21, 2001	Cerro Tololo	M. W. Buie	other TNO	159 km	MPC · JPL
135183	2001 QK_{329}	—	August 23, 2001	Anderson Mesa	LONEOS	·	5.5 km	MPC · JPL
135184	2001 QM_{329}	—	August 23, 2001	Anderson Mesa	LONEOS	TEL	5.9 km	MPC · JPL
135185	2001 RR	—	September 8, 2001	Socorro	LINEAR	·	6.3 km	MPC · JPL
135186	2001 RH_{2}	—	September 8, 2001	Socorro	LINEAR	H	1.0 km	MPC · JPL
135187	2001 RH_{10}	—	September 10, 2001	Socorro	LINEAR	·	8.4 km	MPC · JPL
135188	2001 RA_{14}	—	September 10, 2001	Socorro	LINEAR	·	4.2 km	MPC · JPL
135189	2001 RT_{18}	—	September 7, 2001	Socorro	LINEAR	·	4.4 km	MPC · JPL
135190	2001 RD_{19}	—	September 7, 2001	Socorro	LINEAR	·	9.0 km	MPC · JPL
135191	2001 RS_{19}	—	September 7, 2001	Socorro	LINEAR	KOR	3.0 km	MPC · JPL
135192	2001 RZ_{22}	—	September 7, 2001	Socorro	LINEAR	·	5.2 km	MPC · JPL
135193	2001 RR_{23}	—	September 7, 2001	Socorro	LINEAR	·	3.6 km	MPC · JPL
135194	2001 RY_{23}	—	September 7, 2001	Socorro	LINEAR	NYS	1.7 km	MPC · JPL
135195	2001 RO_{29}	—	September 7, 2001	Socorro	LINEAR	MAS	1.1 km	MPC · JPL
135196	2001 RF_{38}	—	September 8, 2001	Socorro	LINEAR	·	3.4 km	MPC · JPL
135197	2001 RB_{42}	—	September 11, 2001	Socorro	LINEAR	·	3.1 km	MPC · JPL
135198	2001 RX_{42}	—	September 6, 2001	Palomar	NEAT	·	3.7 km	MPC · JPL
135199	2001 RV_{44}	—	September 13, 2001	Palomar	NEAT	TIR ·	7.4 km	MPC · JPL
135200	2001 RR_{49}	—	September 10, 2001	Socorro	LINEAR	·	3.2 km	MPC · JPL

== 135201–135300 ==
back to top

Designation			Discovery			Properties		Ref
Permanent	Provisional	Named after	Date	Site	Discoverer(s)	Category	Diam.	Ref
135201	2001 RN_{52}	—	September 12, 2001	Socorro	LINEAR	·	3.6 km	MPC · JPL
135202	2001 RC_{53}	—	September 12, 2001	Socorro	LINEAR	EOS	3.3 km	MPC · JPL
135203	2001 RV_{53}	—	September 12, 2001	Socorro	LINEAR	·	2.2 km	MPC · JPL
135204	2001 RW_{56}	—	September 12, 2001	Socorro	LINEAR	·	4.0 km	MPC · JPL
135205	2001 RO_{60}	—	September 12, 2001	Socorro	LINEAR	EOS	4.0 km	MPC · JPL
135206	2001 RF_{61}	—	September 12, 2001	Socorro	LINEAR	·	5.2 km	MPC · JPL
135207	2001 RD_{67}	—	September 10, 2001	Socorro	LINEAR	·	4.6 km	MPC · JPL
135208	2001 RF_{68}	—	September 10, 2001	Socorro	LINEAR	·	9.0 km	MPC · JPL
135209	2001 RB_{69}	—	September 10, 2001	Socorro	LINEAR	·	1.3 km	MPC · JPL
135210	2001 RO_{70}	—	September 10, 2001	Socorro	LINEAR	·	5.1 km	MPC · JPL
135211	2001 RL_{72}	—	September 10, 2001	Socorro	LINEAR	EOS · slow	4.7 km	MPC · JPL
135212	2001 RZ_{72}	—	September 10, 2001	Socorro	LINEAR	·	4.1 km	MPC · JPL
135213	2001 RE_{82}	—	September 11, 2001	Anderson Mesa	LONEOS	EOS	6.5 km	MPC · JPL
135214	2001 RE_{85}	—	September 11, 2001	Anderson Mesa	LONEOS	·	3.9 km	MPC · JPL
135215	2001 RT_{85}	—	September 11, 2001	Anderson Mesa	LONEOS	NYS	3.1 km	MPC · JPL
135216	2001 RQ_{86}	—	September 11, 2001	Anderson Mesa	LONEOS	·	4.0 km	MPC · JPL
135217	2001 RH_{88}	—	September 11, 2001	Anderson Mesa	LONEOS	EOS	4.5 km	MPC · JPL
135218	2001 RC_{92}	—	September 11, 2001	Anderson Mesa	LONEOS	·	4.9 km	MPC · JPL
135219	2001 RN_{94}	—	September 11, 2001	Anderson Mesa	LONEOS	·	2.8 km	MPC · JPL
135220	2001 RX_{100}	—	September 12, 2001	Socorro	LINEAR	·	4.0 km	MPC · JPL
135221	2001 RK_{101}	—	September 12, 2001	Socorro	LINEAR	·	6.3 km	MPC · JPL
135222	2001 RS_{103}	—	September 12, 2001	Socorro	LINEAR	·	5.3 km	MPC · JPL
135223	2001 RK_{109}	—	September 12, 2001	Socorro	LINEAR	KOR	3.4 km	MPC · JPL
135224	2001 RO_{119}	—	September 12, 2001	Socorro	LINEAR	·	1.7 km	MPC · JPL
135225	2001 RU_{119}	—	September 12, 2001	Socorro	LINEAR	·	4.8 km	MPC · JPL
135226	2001 RE_{120}	—	September 12, 2001	Socorro	LINEAR	·	4.3 km	MPC · JPL
135227	2001 RX_{121}	—	September 12, 2001	Socorro	LINEAR	·	4.9 km	MPC · JPL
135228	2001 RB_{124}	—	September 12, 2001	Socorro	LINEAR	·	2.1 km	MPC · JPL
135229	2001 RM_{126}	—	September 12, 2001	Socorro	LINEAR	·	3.7 km	MPC · JPL
135230	2001 RC_{127}	—	September 12, 2001	Socorro	LINEAR	·	7.0 km	MPC · JPL
135231	2001 RC_{136}	—	September 12, 2001	Socorro	LINEAR	EOS	4.2 km	MPC · JPL
135232	2001 RY_{139}	—	September 12, 2001	Socorro	LINEAR	NYS	1.4 km	MPC · JPL
135233	2001 RY_{141}	—	September 8, 2001	Socorro	LINEAR	H	980 m	MPC · JPL
135234	2001 RT_{142}	—	September 11, 2001	Palomar	NEAT	·	5.8 km	MPC · JPL
135235	2001 RU_{150}	—	September 11, 2001	Anderson Mesa	LONEOS	·	5.3 km	MPC · JPL
135236	2001 RM_{151}	—	September 11, 2001	Anderson Mesa	LONEOS	EOS	3.9 km	MPC · JPL
135237	2001 SP_{4}	—	September 18, 2001	Goodricke-Pigott	R. A. Tucker	·	6.6 km	MPC · JPL
135238	2001 SM_{5}	—	September 16, 2001	Socorro	LINEAR	H ·	1.1 km	MPC · JPL
135239	2001 SH_{9}	—	September 19, 2001	Fountain Hills	C. W. Juels, P. R. Holvorcem	·	9.1 km	MPC · JPL
135240	2001 SJ_{10}	—	September 19, 2001	Prescott	P. G. Comba	THM	3.8 km	MPC · JPL
135241	2001 SS_{16}	—	September 16, 2001	Socorro	LINEAR	EOS	3.6 km	MPC · JPL
135242	2001 SQ_{17}	—	September 16, 2001	Socorro	LINEAR	EOS	4.3 km	MPC · JPL
135243	2001 ST_{17}	—	September 16, 2001	Socorro	LINEAR	·	4.2 km	MPC · JPL
135244	2001 SA_{19}	—	September 16, 2001	Socorro	LINEAR	·	5.8 km	MPC · JPL
135245	2001 SD_{19}	—	September 16, 2001	Socorro	LINEAR	·	3.7 km	MPC · JPL
135246	2001 SO_{23}	—	September 16, 2001	Socorro	LINEAR	·	5.6 km	MPC · JPL
135247	2001 SB_{30}	—	September 16, 2001	Socorro	LINEAR	·	2.4 km	MPC · JPL
135248	2001 SN_{30}	—	September 16, 2001	Socorro	LINEAR	·	5.8 km	MPC · JPL
135249	2001 SX_{30}	—	September 16, 2001	Socorro	LINEAR	·	5.9 km	MPC · JPL
135250	2001 SY_{33}	—	September 16, 2001	Socorro	LINEAR	THM	5.2 km	MPC · JPL
135251	2001 SY_{37}	—	September 16, 2001	Socorro	LINEAR	·	6.7 km	MPC · JPL
135252	2001 SR_{38}	—	September 16, 2001	Socorro	LINEAR	EUP	4.2 km	MPC · JPL
135253	2001 SL_{41}	—	September 16, 2001	Socorro	LINEAR	HYG	6.9 km	MPC · JPL
135254	2001 SY_{43}	—	September 16, 2001	Socorro	LINEAR	·	1.6 km	MPC · JPL
135255	2001 SP_{45}	—	September 16, 2001	Socorro	LINEAR	EOS	4.5 km	MPC · JPL
135256	2001 SU_{46}	—	September 16, 2001	Socorro	LINEAR	KOR	3.4 km	MPC · JPL
135257	2001 SE_{47}	—	September 16, 2001	Socorro	LINEAR	·	4.8 km	MPC · JPL
135258	2001 SG_{53}	—	September 16, 2001	Socorro	LINEAR	EOS	3.3 km	MPC · JPL
135259	2001 SS_{56}	—	September 16, 2001	Socorro	LINEAR	·	6.2 km	MPC · JPL
135260	2001 SP_{59}	—	September 17, 2001	Socorro	LINEAR	EOS	3.4 km	MPC · JPL
135261	2001 SE_{63}	—	September 17, 2001	Socorro	LINEAR	EOS	6.4 km	MPC · JPL
135262	2001 SJ_{64}	—	September 17, 2001	Socorro	LINEAR	(31811)	5.5 km	MPC · JPL
135263	2001 SP_{73}	—	September 18, 2001	Jonathan B. Postel	Pozzoli, V.	EOS	3.8 km	MPC · JPL
135264	2001 SW_{73}	—	September 21, 2001	Palomar	NEAT	·	5.3 km	MPC · JPL
135265	2001 SZ_{73}	—	September 19, 2001	Anderson Mesa	LONEOS	·	5.6 km	MPC · JPL
135266	2001 SK_{77}	—	September 17, 2001	Socorro	LINEAR	·	7.6 km	MPC · JPL
135267	2001 SC_{80}	—	September 20, 2001	Socorro	LINEAR	·	3.9 km	MPC · JPL
135268 Haigneré	2001 SX_{115}	Haigneré	September 20, 2001	Le Creusot	J.-C. Merlin	·	5.4 km	MPC · JPL
135269	2001 SW_{116}	—	September 16, 2001	Socorro	LINEAR	·	5.7 km	MPC · JPL
135270	2001 ST_{118}	—	September 16, 2001	Socorro	LINEAR	·	3.3 km	MPC · JPL
135271	2001 SY_{120}	—	September 16, 2001	Socorro	LINEAR	·	1.5 km	MPC · JPL
135272	2001 SK_{122}	—	September 16, 2001	Socorro	LINEAR	·	5.4 km	MPC · JPL
135273	2001 SR_{123}	—	September 16, 2001	Socorro	LINEAR	EOS	4.5 km	MPC · JPL
135274	2001 SH_{126}	—	September 16, 2001	Socorro	LINEAR	·	4.9 km	MPC · JPL
135275	2001 SG_{130}	—	September 16, 2001	Socorro	LINEAR	·	3.8 km	MPC · JPL
135276	2001 ST_{130}	—	September 16, 2001	Socorro	LINEAR	·	1.7 km	MPC · JPL
135277	2001 SG_{133}	—	September 16, 2001	Socorro	LINEAR	·	4.7 km	MPC · JPL
135278	2001 SX_{133}	—	September 16, 2001	Socorro	LINEAR	·	3.0 km	MPC · JPL
135279	2001 SD_{135}	—	September 16, 2001	Socorro	LINEAR	·	5.9 km	MPC · JPL
135280	2001 SB_{136}	—	September 16, 2001	Socorro	LINEAR	·	6.2 km	MPC · JPL
135281	2001 SZ_{138}	—	September 16, 2001	Socorro	LINEAR	·	2.9 km	MPC · JPL
135282	2001 SD_{142}	—	September 16, 2001	Socorro	LINEAR	·	4.9 km	MPC · JPL
135283	2001 SU_{143}	—	September 16, 2001	Socorro	LINEAR	·	5.5 km	MPC · JPL
135284	2001 SU_{145}	—	September 16, 2001	Socorro	LINEAR	·	4.2 km	MPC · JPL
135285	2001 SX_{148}	—	September 17, 2001	Socorro	LINEAR	·	2.2 km	MPC · JPL
135286	2001 SL_{149}	—	September 17, 2001	Socorro	LINEAR	·	4.7 km	MPC · JPL
135287	2001 SP_{150}	—	September 17, 2001	Socorro	LINEAR	·	2.2 km	MPC · JPL
135288	2001 SF_{154}	—	September 17, 2001	Socorro	LINEAR	THM	3.4 km	MPC · JPL
135289	2001 SD_{156}	—	September 17, 2001	Socorro	LINEAR	·	4.6 km	MPC · JPL
135290	2001 SC_{158}	—	September 17, 2001	Socorro	LINEAR	·	5.0 km	MPC · JPL
135291	2001 SD_{159}	—	September 17, 2001	Socorro	LINEAR	·	5.6 km	MPC · JPL
135292	2001 SE_{163}	—	September 17, 2001	Socorro	LINEAR	·	3.7 km	MPC · JPL
135293	2001 SY_{164}	—	September 17, 2001	Socorro	LINEAR	·	5.4 km	MPC · JPL
135294	2001 SQ_{165}	—	September 19, 2001	Socorro	LINEAR	·	3.4 km	MPC · JPL
135295	2001 SQ_{183}	—	September 19, 2001	Socorro	LINEAR	·	3.0 km	MPC · JPL
135296	2001 SX_{189}	—	September 19, 2001	Socorro	LINEAR	·	3.6 km	MPC · JPL
135297	2001 SX_{214}	—	September 19, 2001	Socorro	LINEAR	HYG	4.2 km	MPC · JPL
135298	2001 SE_{215}	—	September 19, 2001	Socorro	LINEAR	·	2.5 km	MPC · JPL
135299	2001 SO_{222}	—	September 19, 2001	Socorro	LINEAR	EOS	3.4 km	MPC · JPL
135300	2001 SB_{244}	—	September 19, 2001	Socorro	LINEAR	EOS	2.9 km	MPC · JPL

== 135301–135400 ==
back to top

Designation			Discovery			Properties		Ref
Permanent	Provisional	Named after	Date	Site	Discoverer(s)	Category	Diam.	Ref
135301	2001 SO_{245}	—	September 19, 2001	Socorro	LINEAR	THM	4.5 km	MPC · JPL
135302	2001 SC_{246}	—	September 19, 2001	Socorro	LINEAR	THM	4.2 km	MPC · JPL
135303	2001 SX_{248}	—	September 19, 2001	Socorro	LINEAR	V	1.2 km	MPC · JPL
135304	2001 SA_{249}	—	September 19, 2001	Socorro	LINEAR	NYS	2.1 km	MPC · JPL
135305	2001 SH_{251}	—	September 19, 2001	Socorro	LINEAR	THM	4.3 km	MPC · JPL
135306	2001 SD_{253}	—	September 19, 2001	Socorro	LINEAR	·	4.4 km	MPC · JPL
135307	2001 SC_{254}	—	September 19, 2001	Socorro	LINEAR	·	3.0 km	MPC · JPL
135308	2001 SF_{254}	—	September 19, 2001	Socorro	LINEAR	·	2.5 km	MPC · JPL
135309	2001 ST_{261}	—	September 21, 2001	Socorro	LINEAR	EOS	4.5 km	MPC · JPL
135310	2001 SS_{264}	—	September 17, 2001	Desert Eagle	W. K. Y. Yeung	·	4.9 km	MPC · JPL
135311	2001 SQ_{265}	—	September 25, 2001	Desert Eagle	W. K. Y. Yeung	·	5.9 km	MPC · JPL
135312	2001 SS_{266}	—	September 25, 2001	Desert Eagle	W. K. Y. Yeung	·	4.6 km	MPC · JPL
135313	2001 SY_{268}	—	September 19, 2001	Kitt Peak	Spacewatch	KOR	2.5 km	MPC · JPL
135314	2001 SA_{271}	—	September 20, 2001	Socorro	LINEAR	EOS	3.5 km	MPC · JPL
135315	2001 SM_{277}	—	September 21, 2001	Anderson Mesa	LONEOS	CYB	7.2 km	MPC · JPL
135316	2001 SN_{277}	—	September 21, 2001	Anderson Mesa	LONEOS	EOS	4.1 km	MPC · JPL
135317	2001 SO_{280}	—	September 21, 2001	Anderson Mesa	LONEOS	THM	5.8 km	MPC · JPL
135318	2001 SW_{286}	—	September 22, 2001	Palomar	NEAT	·	4.5 km	MPC · JPL
135319	2001 ST_{289}	—	September 29, 2001	Palomar	NEAT	RAF	1.9 km	MPC · JPL
135320	2001 SM_{295}	—	September 20, 2001	Socorro	LINEAR	·	2.8 km	MPC · JPL
135321	2001 SP_{295}	—	September 20, 2001	Socorro	LINEAR	·	2.6 km	MPC · JPL
135322	2001 SF_{304}	—	September 20, 2001	Socorro	LINEAR	·	1.6 km	MPC · JPL
135323	2001 SG_{309}	—	September 22, 2001	Socorro	LINEAR	·	6.2 km	MPC · JPL
135324	2001 SZ_{313}	—	September 21, 2001	Socorro	LINEAR	·	4.5 km	MPC · JPL
135325	2001 SW_{314}	—	September 23, 2001	Socorro	LINEAR	·	4.4 km	MPC · JPL
135326	2001 SP_{318}	—	September 21, 2001	Socorro	LINEAR	·	1.9 km	MPC · JPL
135327	2001 SP_{321}	—	September 25, 2001	Socorro	LINEAR	·	5.6 km	MPC · JPL
135328	2001 SF_{323}	—	September 25, 2001	Socorro	LINEAR	·	2.1 km	MPC · JPL
135329	2001 SP_{327}	—	September 18, 2001	Anderson Mesa	LONEOS	NYS ·	2.9 km	MPC · JPL
135330	2001 SR_{343}	—	September 22, 2001	Anderson Mesa	LONEOS	·	9.0 km	MPC · JPL
135331	2001 SK_{346}	—	September 25, 2001	Socorro	LINEAR	·	5.6 km	MPC · JPL
135332	2001 SO_{346}	—	September 25, 2001	Socorro	LINEAR	·	5.7 km	MPC · JPL
135333	2001 TE_{1}	—	October 8, 2001	Palomar	NEAT	slow	2.7 km	MPC · JPL
135334	2001 TG_{2}	—	October 15, 2001	Socorro	LINEAR	EOS	3.3 km	MPC · JPL
135335	2001 TC_{3}	—	October 7, 2001	Palomar	NEAT	·	3.3 km	MPC · JPL
135336	2001 TW_{12}	—	October 11, 2001	Socorro	LINEAR	EUP	8.6 km	MPC · JPL
135337	2001 TE_{14}	—	October 13, 2001	Ondřejov	P. Pravec, P. Kušnirák	·	2.9 km	MPC · JPL
135338	2001 TX_{19}	—	October 9, 2001	Socorro	LINEAR	·	3.8 km	MPC · JPL
135339	2001 TM_{21}	—	October 11, 2001	Socorro	LINEAR	·	3.8 km	MPC · JPL
135340	2001 TF_{22}	—	October 13, 2001	Socorro	LINEAR	AEG	6.5 km	MPC · JPL
135341	2001 TF_{23}	—	October 13, 2001	Socorro	LINEAR	·	3.9 km	MPC · JPL
135342	2001 TQ_{27}	—	October 14, 2001	Socorro	LINEAR	·	2.8 km	MPC · JPL
135343	2001 TS_{27}	—	October 14, 2001	Socorro	LINEAR	·	4.4 km	MPC · JPL
135344	2001 TC_{34}	—	October 14, 2001	Socorro	LINEAR	·	3.5 km	MPC · JPL
135345	2001 TS_{39}	—	October 14, 2001	Socorro	LINEAR	·	8.4 km	MPC · JPL
135346	2001 TN_{46}	—	October 15, 2001	Socorro	LINEAR	EUP	7.6 km	MPC · JPL
135347	2001 TC_{48}	—	October 9, 2001	Kitt Peak	Spacewatch	·	2.0 km	MPC · JPL
135348	2001 TP_{55}	—	October 14, 2001	Socorro	LINEAR	EOS	4.1 km	MPC · JPL
135349	2001 TX_{64}	—	October 13, 2001	Socorro	LINEAR	·	4.7 km	MPC · JPL
135350	2001 TR_{66}	—	October 13, 2001	Socorro	LINEAR	PAD	3.2 km	MPC · JPL
135351	2001 TU_{68}	—	October 13, 2001	Socorro	LINEAR	·	3.2 km	MPC · JPL
135352	2001 TV_{74}	—	October 13, 2001	Socorro	LINEAR	·	4.6 km	MPC · JPL
135353	2001 TH_{75}	—	October 13, 2001	Socorro	LINEAR	·	4.0 km	MPC · JPL
135354	2001 TA_{77}	—	October 13, 2001	Socorro	LINEAR	THM	5.8 km	MPC · JPL
135355	2001 TE_{77}	—	October 13, 2001	Socorro	LINEAR	·	6.4 km	MPC · JPL
135356	2001 TF_{83}	—	October 14, 2001	Socorro	LINEAR	EOS	3.7 km	MPC · JPL
135357	2001 TM_{98}	—	October 14, 2001	Socorro	LINEAR	THM	5.5 km	MPC · JPL
135358	2001 TX_{104}	—	October 13, 2001	Socorro	LINEAR	·	4.3 km	MPC · JPL
135359	2001 TX_{109}	—	October 14, 2001	Socorro	LINEAR	HYG	5.0 km	MPC · JPL
135360	2001 TT_{112}	—	October 14, 2001	Socorro	LINEAR	·	5.3 km	MPC · JPL
135361	2001 TW_{118}	—	October 15, 2001	Socorro	LINEAR	·	9.8 km	MPC · JPL
135362	2001 TF_{121}	—	October 15, 2001	Socorro	LINEAR	·	4.9 km	MPC · JPL
135363	2001 TD_{123}	—	October 6, 2001	Palomar	NEAT	·	6.4 km	MPC · JPL
135364	2001 TL_{123}	—	October 12, 2001	Haleakala	NEAT	EOS	4.2 km	MPC · JPL
135365	2001 TS_{123}	—	October 12, 2001	Haleakala	NEAT	EOS	3.9 km	MPC · JPL
135366	2001 TF_{124}	—	October 12, 2001	Haleakala	NEAT	·	6.4 km	MPC · JPL
135367	2001 TC_{126}	—	October 10, 2001	Kitt Peak	Spacewatch	·	4.7 km	MPC · JPL
135368	2001 TF_{126}	—	October 13, 2001	Kitt Peak	Spacewatch	NYS · fast	1.4 km	MPC · JPL
135369	2001 TB_{128}	—	October 10, 2001	Palomar	NEAT	·	3.7 km	MPC · JPL
135370	2001 TE_{133}	—	October 12, 2001	Haleakala	NEAT	LUT	8.6 km	MPC · JPL
135371	2001 TY_{135}	—	October 13, 2001	Palomar	NEAT	(18466)	2.6 km	MPC · JPL
135372	2001 TU_{136}	—	October 14, 2001	Palomar	NEAT	·	6.0 km	MPC · JPL
135373	2001 TQ_{137}	—	October 14, 2001	Palomar	NEAT	LIX	6.8 km	MPC · JPL
135374	2001 TT_{138}	—	October 10, 2001	Palomar	NEAT	·	6.1 km	MPC · JPL
135375	2001 TU_{138}	—	October 10, 2001	Palomar	NEAT	·	8.0 km	MPC · JPL
135376	2001 TT_{139}	—	October 10, 2001	Palomar	NEAT	TIR	4.2 km	MPC · JPL
135377	2001 TA_{141}	—	October 10, 2001	Palomar	NEAT	·	6.8 km	MPC · JPL
135378	2001 TG_{148}	—	October 10, 2001	Palomar	NEAT	·	2.5 km	MPC · JPL
135379	2001 TZ_{153}	—	October 15, 2001	Palomar	NEAT	·	5.6 km	MPC · JPL
135380	2001 TY_{158}	—	October 11, 2001	Palomar	NEAT	·	5.8 km	MPC · JPL
135381	2001 TK_{162}	—	October 11, 2001	Palomar	NEAT	·	5.3 km	MPC · JPL
135382	2001 TO_{162}	—	October 11, 2001	Palomar	NEAT	·	1.6 km	MPC · JPL
135383	2001 TZ_{165}	—	October 14, 2001	Socorro	LINEAR	·	5.5 km	MPC · JPL
135384	2001 TT_{166}	—	October 15, 2001	Socorro	LINEAR	LIX	7.4 km	MPC · JPL
135385	2001 TE_{175}	—	October 14, 2001	Socorro	LINEAR	·	5.1 km	MPC · JPL
135386	2001 TS_{184}	—	October 14, 2001	Socorro	LINEAR	·	4.1 km	MPC · JPL
135387	2001 TB_{187}	—	October 14, 2001	Socorro	LINEAR	·	1.2 km	MPC · JPL
135388	2001 TN_{187}	—	October 14, 2001	Socorro	LINEAR	·	3.5 km	MPC · JPL
135389	2001 TU_{188}	—	October 14, 2001	Socorro	LINEAR	·	6.2 km	MPC · JPL
135390	2001 TA_{196}	—	October 12, 2001	Haleakala	NEAT	·	5.0 km	MPC · JPL
135391	2001 TM_{196}	—	October 14, 2001	Palomar	NEAT	·	6.7 km	MPC · JPL
135392	2001 TM_{198}	—	October 11, 2001	Socorro	LINEAR	·	4.7 km	MPC · JPL
135393	2001 TO_{198}	—	October 11, 2001	Socorro	LINEAR	·	4.1 km	MPC · JPL
135394	2001 TD_{200}	—	October 11, 2001	Socorro	LINEAR	·	3.7 km	MPC · JPL
135395	2001 TD_{204}	—	October 11, 2001	Socorro	LINEAR	·	5.3 km	MPC · JPL
135396	2001 TO_{206}	—	October 11, 2001	Socorro	LINEAR	·	5.2 km	MPC · JPL
135397	2001 TZ_{208}	—	October 12, 2001	Kitt Peak	Spacewatch	·	3.0 km	MPC · JPL
135398	2001 TT_{210}	—	October 13, 2001	Anderson Mesa	LONEOS	·	7.0 km	MPC · JPL
135399	2001 TQ_{211}	—	October 13, 2001	Palomar	NEAT	·	4.5 km	MPC · JPL
135400	2001 TC_{213}	—	October 13, 2001	Palomar	NEAT	·	5.4 km	MPC · JPL

== 135401–135500 ==
back to top

Designation			Discovery			Properties		Ref
Permanent	Provisional	Named after	Date	Site	Discoverer(s)	Category	Diam.	Ref
135401	2001 TQ_{213}	—	October 13, 2001	Palomar	NEAT	ELF	6.3 km	MPC · JPL
135402	2001 TP_{215}	—	October 13, 2001	Palomar	NEAT	·	8.5 km	MPC · JPL
135403	2001 TV_{215}	—	October 13, 2001	Palomar	NEAT	·	7.2 km	MPC · JPL
135404	2001 TH_{218}	—	October 14, 2001	Anderson Mesa	LONEOS	VER	7.2 km	MPC · JPL
135405	2001 TF_{226}	—	October 14, 2001	Palomar	NEAT	·	6.5 km	MPC · JPL
135406	2001 TY_{227}	—	October 15, 2001	Socorro	LINEAR	·	5.2 km	MPC · JPL
135407	2001 TD_{229}	—	October 15, 2001	Socorro	LINEAR	·	5.7 km	MPC · JPL
135408	2001 TY_{235}	—	October 15, 2001	Kitt Peak	Spacewatch	·	6.1 km	MPC · JPL
135409	2001 TR_{238}	—	October 15, 2001	Palomar	NEAT	·	4.4 km	MPC · JPL
135410	2001 UX_{5}	—	October 21, 2001	Desert Eagle	W. K. Y. Yeung	·	6.1 km	MPC · JPL
135411	2001 UE_{16}	—	October 25, 2001	Desert Eagle	W. K. Y. Yeung	HYG	6.5 km	MPC · JPL
135412	2001 UC_{21}	—	October 17, 2001	Socorro	LINEAR	EOS	4.9 km	MPC · JPL
135413	2001 UA_{22}	—	October 17, 2001	Socorro	LINEAR	·	3.4 km	MPC · JPL
135414	2001 UP_{24}	—	October 18, 2001	Socorro	LINEAR	·	9.9 km	MPC · JPL
135415	2001 UU_{24}	—	October 18, 2001	Socorro	LINEAR	EOS	4.5 km	MPC · JPL
135416	2001 UA_{25}	—	October 18, 2001	Socorro	LINEAR	VER	6.8 km	MPC · JPL
135417	2001 UB_{31}	—	October 16, 2001	Socorro	LINEAR	·	5.8 km	MPC · JPL
135418	2001 UK_{35}	—	October 16, 2001	Socorro	LINEAR	·	8.0 km	MPC · JPL
135419	2001 UN_{35}	—	October 16, 2001	Socorro	LINEAR	·	4.3 km	MPC · JPL
135420	2001 UT_{44}	—	October 17, 2001	Socorro	LINEAR	THM	4.2 km	MPC · JPL
135421	2001 UC_{49}	—	October 17, 2001	Socorro	LINEAR	slow	6.1 km	MPC · JPL
135422	2001 UT_{80}	—	October 20, 2001	Socorro	LINEAR	·	3.6 km	MPC · JPL
135423	2001 UZ_{80}	—	October 20, 2001	Socorro	LINEAR	·	6.1 km	MPC · JPL
135424	2001 UW_{84}	—	October 21, 2001	Socorro	LINEAR	·	4.6 km	MPC · JPL
135425	2001 UR_{98}	—	October 17, 2001	Socorro	LINEAR	MRX	1.8 km	MPC · JPL
135426	2001 UD_{106}	—	October 20, 2001	Socorro	LINEAR	HOF	4.1 km	MPC · JPL
135427	2001 UZ_{111}	—	October 21, 2001	Socorro	LINEAR	·	2.5 km	MPC · JPL
135428	2001 UQ_{117}	—	October 22, 2001	Socorro	LINEAR	·	6.5 km	MPC · JPL
135429	2001 UG_{121}	—	October 22, 2001	Socorro	LINEAR	·	5.4 km	MPC · JPL
135430	2001 UT_{122}	—	October 22, 2001	Socorro	LINEAR	HYG	6.5 km	MPC · JPL
135431	2001 UY_{129}	—	October 20, 2001	Socorro	LINEAR	·	4.6 km	MPC · JPL
135432	2001 UG_{137}	—	October 23, 2001	Socorro	LINEAR	·	5.2 km	MPC · JPL
135433	2001 UA_{142}	—	October 23, 2001	Socorro	LINEAR	·	2.5 km	MPC · JPL
135434	2001 UD_{143}	—	October 23, 2001	Socorro	LINEAR	·	1.2 km	MPC · JPL
135435	2001 UP_{146}	—	October 23, 2001	Socorro	LINEAR	·	2.9 km	MPC · JPL
135436	2001 UF_{154}	—	October 23, 2001	Socorro	LINEAR	THM	5.7 km	MPC · JPL
135437	2001 UV_{159}	—	October 23, 2001	Socorro	LINEAR	(11882)	2.8 km	MPC · JPL
135438	2001 UY_{159}	—	October 23, 2001	Socorro	LINEAR	·	1.8 km	MPC · JPL
135439	2001 UG_{179}	—	October 26, 2001	Palomar	NEAT	·	8.0 km	MPC · JPL
135440	2001 UV_{179}	—	October 26, 2001	Haleakala	NEAT	·	6.7 km	MPC · JPL
135441	2001 UJ_{201}	—	October 19, 2001	Palomar	NEAT	·	1.1 km	MPC · JPL
135442	2001 UF_{206}	—	October 20, 2001	Socorro	LINEAR	EOS	4.7 km	MPC · JPL
135443	2001 UN_{208}	—	October 20, 2001	Kitt Peak	Spacewatch	·	1.2 km	MPC · JPL
135444	2001 VJ_{9}	—	November 9, 2001	Socorro	LINEAR	THM	3.8 km	MPC · JPL
135445	2001 VW_{13}	—	November 10, 2001	Socorro	LINEAR	·	4.0 km	MPC · JPL
135446	2001 VT_{14}	—	November 10, 2001	Socorro	LINEAR	·	7.9 km	MPC · JPL
135447	2001 VY_{15}	—	November 6, 2001	Palomar	NEAT	·	7.0 km	MPC · JPL
135448	2001 VL_{16}	—	November 10, 2001	Palomar	NEAT	·	8.6 km	MPC · JPL
135449	2001 VT_{16}	—	November 10, 2001	Socorro	LINEAR	·	7.1 km	MPC · JPL
135450	2001 VV_{17}	—	November 9, 2001	Socorro	LINEAR	·	6.2 km	MPC · JPL
135451	2001 VP_{25}	—	November 9, 2001	Socorro	LINEAR	AGN	1.7 km	MPC · JPL
135452	2001 VF_{26}	—	November 9, 2001	Socorro	LINEAR	THM	7.0 km	MPC · JPL
135453	2001 VR_{34}	—	November 9, 2001	Socorro	LINEAR	·	5.2 km	MPC · JPL
135454	2001 VW_{43}	—	November 9, 2001	Socorro	LINEAR	·	5.7 km	MPC · JPL
135455	2001 VA_{50}	—	November 10, 2001	Socorro	LINEAR	·	6.2 km	MPC · JPL
135456	2001 VA_{51}	—	November 10, 2001	Socorro	LINEAR	EOS	5.3 km	MPC · JPL
135457	2001 VR_{52}	—	November 10, 2001	Socorro	LINEAR	·	6.7 km	MPC · JPL
135458	2001 VD_{53}	—	November 10, 2001	Socorro	LINEAR	·	8.1 km	MPC · JPL
135459	2001 VM_{60}	—	November 10, 2001	Socorro	LINEAR	·	3.2 km	MPC · JPL
135460	2001 VB_{61}	—	November 10, 2001	Socorro	LINEAR	·	5.1 km	MPC · JPL
135461	2001 VE_{74}	—	November 12, 2001	Socorro	LINEAR	slow	2.9 km	MPC · JPL
135462	2001 VQ_{78}	—	November 15, 2001	Palomar	NEAT	H	890 m	MPC · JPL
135463	2001 VL_{83}	—	November 10, 2001	Socorro	LINEAR	·	2.4 km	MPC · JPL
135464	2001 VT_{85}	—	November 12, 2001	Socorro	LINEAR	·	3.7 km	MPC · JPL
135465	2001 VG_{90}	—	November 15, 2001	Socorro	LINEAR	·	4.5 km	MPC · JPL
135466	2001 VO_{91}	—	November 15, 2001	Socorro	LINEAR	·	5.2 km	MPC · JPL
135467	2001 VH_{92}	—	November 15, 2001	Socorro	LINEAR	·	6.8 km	MPC · JPL
135468	2001 VJ_{99}	—	November 15, 2001	Socorro	LINEAR	·	6.1 km	MPC · JPL
135469	2001 VV_{102}	—	November 12, 2001	Socorro	LINEAR	·	2.3 km	MPC · JPL
135470	2001 WZ_{10}	—	November 17, 2001	Socorro	LINEAR	·	7.7 km	MPC · JPL
135471	2001 WL_{12}	—	November 17, 2001	Socorro	LINEAR	·	2.5 km	MPC · JPL
135472	2001 WA_{18}	—	November 17, 2001	Socorro	LINEAR	·	3.2 km	MPC · JPL
135473	2001 WD_{21}	—	November 18, 2001	Socorro	LINEAR	·	2.5 km	MPC · JPL
135474	2001 WE_{26}	—	November 17, 2001	Socorro	LINEAR	THM	3.6 km	MPC · JPL
135475	2001 WQ_{33}	—	November 17, 2001	Socorro	LINEAR	·	2.7 km	MPC · JPL
135476	2001 WN_{34}	—	November 17, 2001	Socorro	LINEAR	(5)	2.3 km	MPC · JPL
135477	2001 WL_{41}	—	November 17, 2001	Socorro	LINEAR	H	1.1 km	MPC · JPL
135478	2001 WQ_{47}	—	November 19, 2001	Anderson Mesa	LONEOS	·	5.8 km	MPC · JPL
135479	2001 WT_{47}	—	November 19, 2001	Anderson Mesa	LONEOS	·	7.8 km	MPC · JPL
135480	2001 WQ_{48}	—	November 19, 2001	Anderson Mesa	LONEOS	·	6.4 km	MPC · JPL
135481	2001 WU_{48}	—	November 19, 2001	Anderson Mesa	LONEOS	·	5.9 km	MPC · JPL
135482	2001 WK_{67}	—	November 20, 2001	Socorro	LINEAR	·	2.9 km	MPC · JPL
135483	2001 WM_{99}	—	November 17, 2001	Haleakala	NEAT	CYB	7.0 km	MPC · JPL
135484	2001 WZ_{100}	—	November 16, 2001	Kitt Peak	Spacewatch	·	1.3 km	MPC · JPL
135485	2001 XH_{1}	—	December 8, 2001	Oizumi	T. Kobayashi	·	1.5 km	MPC · JPL
135486	2001 XP_{2}	—	December 8, 2001	Socorro	LINEAR	H	1.1 km	MPC · JPL
135487	2001 XK_{3}	—	December 8, 2001	Socorro	LINEAR	H	1.4 km	MPC · JPL
135488	2001 XT_{5}	—	December 7, 2001	Socorro	LINEAR	·	7.0 km	MPC · JPL
135489	2001 XQ_{7}	—	December 8, 2001	Socorro	LINEAR	TIR ·	7.3 km	MPC · JPL
135490	2001 XT_{9}	—	December 9, 2001	Socorro	LINEAR	·	6.6 km	MPC · JPL
135491	2001 XQ_{18}	—	December 9, 2001	Socorro	LINEAR	MRX	2.3 km	MPC · JPL
135492	2001 XL_{35}	—	December 9, 2001	Socorro	LINEAR	EOS	3.9 km	MPC · JPL
135493	2001 XN_{48}	—	December 10, 2001	Socorro	LINEAR	·	10 km	MPC · JPL
135494	2001 XW_{48}	—	December 10, 2001	Socorro	LINEAR	·	2.7 km	MPC · JPL
135495	2001 XB_{58}	—	December 10, 2001	Socorro	LINEAR	THM	4.6 km	MPC · JPL
135496	2001 XZ_{58}	—	December 10, 2001	Socorro	LINEAR	·	6.3 km	MPC · JPL
135497	2001 XM_{76}	—	December 11, 2001	Socorro	LINEAR	·	5.9 km	MPC · JPL
135498	2001 XR_{80}	—	December 11, 2001	Socorro	LINEAR	T_{j} (2.98)	8.1 km	MPC · JPL
135499	2001 XG_{81}	—	December 11, 2001	Socorro	LINEAR	AGN	2.3 km	MPC · JPL
135500	2001 XZ_{89}	—	December 10, 2001	Socorro	LINEAR	(7744)	2.9 km	MPC · JPL

== 135501–135600 ==
back to top

Designation			Discovery			Properties		Ref
Permanent	Provisional	Named after	Date	Site	Discoverer(s)	Category	Diam.	Ref
135501	2001 XC_{95}	—	December 10, 2001	Socorro	LINEAR	·	1.3 km	MPC · JPL
135502	2001 XK_{98}	—	December 10, 2001	Socorro	LINEAR	·	7.7 km	MPC · JPL
135503	2001 XH_{108}	—	December 10, 2001	Socorro	LINEAR	·	1.8 km	MPC · JPL
135504	2001 XA_{110}	—	December 11, 2001	Socorro	LINEAR	·	6.4 km	MPC · JPL
135505	2001 XY_{143}	—	December 14, 2001	Socorro	LINEAR	·	2.4 km	MPC · JPL
135506	2001 XZ_{156}	—	December 14, 2001	Socorro	LINEAR	THM	4.1 km	MPC · JPL
135507	2001 XL_{191}	—	December 14, 2001	Socorro	LINEAR	HYG	5.0 km	MPC · JPL
135508	2001 XU_{226}	—	December 15, 2001	Socorro	LINEAR	AGN	2.1 km	MPC · JPL
135509	2001 XP_{233}	—	December 15, 2001	Socorro	LINEAR	·	4.7 km	MPC · JPL
135510	2001 XZ_{243}	—	December 15, 2001	Socorro	LINEAR	·	1.4 km	MPC · JPL
135511	2001 XB_{244}	—	December 15, 2001	Socorro	LINEAR	·	2.7 km	MPC · JPL
135512	2001 XX_{257}	—	December 7, 2001	Palomar	NEAT	·	8.4 km	MPC · JPL
135513	2001 XR_{261}	—	December 11, 2001	Socorro	LINEAR	·	3.6 km	MPC · JPL
135514	2001 XV_{263}	—	December 14, 2001	Anderson Mesa	LONEOS	·	7.1 km	MPC · JPL
135515	2001 YT	—	December 18, 2001	Kingsnake	J. V. McClusky	·	6.5 km	MPC · JPL
135516	2001 YC_{13}	—	December 17, 2001	Socorro	LINEAR	·	1.3 km	MPC · JPL
135517	2001 YZ_{20}	—	December 18, 2001	Socorro	LINEAR	·	2.1 km	MPC · JPL
135518	2001 YC_{25}	—	December 18, 2001	Socorro	LINEAR	·	930 m	MPC · JPL
135519	2001 YE_{37}	—	December 18, 2001	Socorro	LINEAR	·	4.9 km	MPC · JPL
135520	2001 YR_{66}	—	December 18, 2001	Socorro	LINEAR	NYS	2.9 km	MPC · JPL
135521	2001 YN_{84}	—	December 18, 2001	Socorro	LINEAR	·	1.7 km	MPC · JPL
135522	2001 YZ_{101}	—	December 17, 2001	Socorro	LINEAR	·	4.3 km	MPC · JPL
135523	2001 YW_{147}	—	December 18, 2001	Socorro	LINEAR	·	5.4 km	MPC · JPL
135524	2001 YH_{154}	—	December 19, 2001	Palomar	NEAT	·	1.2 km	MPC · JPL
135525	2002 AO_{13}	—	January 11, 2002	Desert Eagle	W. K. Y. Yeung	·	3.4 km	MPC · JPL
135526	2002 AA_{145}	—	January 13, 2002	Socorro	LINEAR	AGN	1.9 km	MPC · JPL
135527	2002 AE_{161}	—	January 13, 2002	Socorro	LINEAR	·	1.2 km	MPC · JPL
135528	2002 AY_{181}	—	January 5, 2002	Palomar	NEAT	H	960 m	MPC · JPL
135529	2002 AO_{202}	—	January 13, 2002	Socorro	LINEAR	·	4.7 km	MPC · JPL
135530	2002 AX_{202}	—	January 13, 2002	Socorro	LINEAR	·	1.3 km	MPC · JPL
135531	2002 BM_{16}	—	January 19, 2002	Socorro	LINEAR	·	2.3 km	MPC · JPL
135532	2002 CR_{12}	—	February 7, 2002	Fountain Hills	C. W. Juels, P. R. Holvorcem	·	6.7 km	MPC · JPL
135533	2002 CF_{52}	—	February 12, 2002	Desert Eagle	W. K. Y. Yeung	·	1.4 km	MPC · JPL
135534	2002 CC_{54}	—	February 7, 2002	Socorro	LINEAR	·	1.2 km	MPC · JPL
135535	2002 CA_{82}	—	February 7, 2002	Socorro	LINEAR	·	1.1 km	MPC · JPL
135536	2002 CT_{130}	—	February 7, 2002	Socorro	LINEAR	·	940 m	MPC · JPL
135537	2002 CD_{165}	—	February 8, 2002	Socorro	LINEAR	·	2.9 km	MPC · JPL
135538	2002 CD_{213}	—	February 10, 2002	Socorro	LINEAR	·	1.7 km	MPC · JPL
135539	2002 CA_{240}	—	February 11, 2002	Socorro	LINEAR	V	920 m	MPC · JPL
135540	2002 CC_{245}	—	February 13, 2002	Socorro	LINEAR	L4	12 km	MPC · JPL
135541	2002 CL_{251}	—	February 3, 2002	Palomar	NEAT	·	1.2 km	MPC · JPL
135542	2002 CQ_{286}	—	February 10, 2002	Kitt Peak	Spacewatch	(5)	1.4 km	MPC · JPL
135543	2002 CR_{294}	—	February 10, 2002	Socorro	LINEAR	EOS	3.4 km	MPC · JPL
135544	2002 CA_{297}	—	February 10, 2002	Socorro	LINEAR	·	2.5 km	MPC · JPL
135545	2002 CU_{311}	—	February 11, 2002	Socorro	LINEAR	·	1.3 km	MPC · JPL
135546	2002 EY_{8}	—	March 13, 2002	Socorro	LINEAR	·	1.2 km	MPC · JPL
135547	2002 EN_{14}	—	March 6, 2002	Palomar	NEAT	L4	18 km	MPC · JPL
135548	2002 EJ_{27}	—	March 9, 2002	Socorro	LINEAR	·	1.1 km	MPC · JPL
135549	2002 ET_{28}	—	March 9, 2002	Socorro	LINEAR	·	970 m	MPC · JPL
135550	2002 EK_{36}	—	March 9, 2002	Kitt Peak	Spacewatch	·	940 m	MPC · JPL
135551	2002 ED_{43}	—	March 12, 2002	Socorro	LINEAR	·	2.0 km	MPC · JPL
135552	2002 EW_{50}	—	March 12, 2002	Palomar	NEAT	·	1.2 km	MPC · JPL
135553	2002 EF_{60}	—	March 13, 2002	Socorro	LINEAR	·	1.8 km	MPC · JPL
135554	2002 EO_{69}	—	March 13, 2002	Socorro	LINEAR	·	1.4 km	MPC · JPL
135555	2002 ER_{69}	—	March 13, 2002	Socorro	LINEAR	·	2.0 km	MPC · JPL
135556	2002 EM_{74}	—	March 13, 2002	Socorro	LINEAR	·	2.7 km	MPC · JPL
135557	2002 EZ_{74}	—	March 13, 2002	Socorro	LINEAR	·	1.5 km	MPC · JPL
135558	2002 EG_{75}	—	March 13, 2002	Socorro	LINEAR	·	1.2 km	MPC · JPL
135559	2002 FE_{3}	—	March 16, 2002	Socorro	LINEAR	·	1.1 km	MPC · JPL
135560	2002 FC_{5}	—	March 20, 2002	Socorro	LINEAR	PHO	1.8 km	MPC · JPL
135561 Tautvaišienė	2002 FK_{5}	Tautvaišienė	March 16, 2002	Moletai	K. Černis, Zdanavicius, J.	·	1.1 km	MPC · JPL
135562	2002 FX_{7}	—	March 16, 2002	Socorro	LINEAR	·	1.2 km	MPC · JPL
135563	2002 FU_{9}	—	March 16, 2002	Socorro	LINEAR	·	1.3 km	MPC · JPL
135564	2002 GT_{9}	—	April 14, 2002	Socorro	LINEAR	(883)	1.4 km	MPC · JPL
135565	2002 GU_{10}	—	April 10, 2002	Socorro	LINEAR	·	1.5 km	MPC · JPL
135566	2002 GT_{13}	—	April 14, 2002	Socorro	LINEAR	V	920 m	MPC · JPL
135567	2002 GJ_{15}	—	April 15, 2002	Socorro	LINEAR	·	1.4 km	MPC · JPL
135568	2002 GC_{18}	—	April 15, 2002	Socorro	LINEAR	·	2.2 km	MPC · JPL
135569	2002 GO_{23}	—	April 15, 2002	Palomar	NEAT	·	2.4 km	MPC · JPL
135570	2002 GF_{26}	—	April 14, 2002	Socorro	LINEAR	V	1.4 km	MPC · JPL
135571	2002 GG_{32}	—	April 8, 2002	Cerro Tololo	M. W. Buie	res · 2:5 · critical	140 km	MPC · JPL
135572	2002 GJ_{34}	—	April 1, 2002	Palomar	NEAT	·	1.4 km	MPC · JPL
135573	2002 GH_{42}	—	April 4, 2002	Palomar	NEAT	·	1.4 km	MPC · JPL
135574	2002 GQ_{49}	—	April 5, 2002	Palomar	NEAT	·	1.4 km	MPC · JPL
135575	2002 GW_{55}	—	April 5, 2002	Palomar	NEAT	·	1.5 km	MPC · JPL
135576	2002 GS_{56}	—	April 5, 2002	Palomar	NEAT	·	1.4 km	MPC · JPL
135577	2002 GD_{67}	—	April 8, 2002	Kitt Peak	Spacewatch	·	1.3 km	MPC · JPL
135578	2002 GG_{72}	—	April 9, 2002	Anderson Mesa	LONEOS	·	1.6 km	MPC · JPL
135579	2002 GN_{72}	—	April 9, 2002	Anderson Mesa	LONEOS	·	1.6 km	MPC · JPL
135580	2002 GQ_{74}	—	April 9, 2002	Kitt Peak	Spacewatch	·	1.3 km	MPC · JPL
135581	2002 GF_{80}	—	April 10, 2002	Socorro	LINEAR	·	2.0 km	MPC · JPL
135582	2002 GY_{82}	—	April 10, 2002	Socorro	LINEAR	ERI	2.6 km	MPC · JPL
135583	2002 GV_{92}	—	April 9, 2002	Socorro	LINEAR	·	1.3 km	MPC · JPL
135584	2002 GQ_{100}	—	April 10, 2002	Socorro	LINEAR	·	1.4 km	MPC · JPL
135585	2002 GU_{102}	—	April 10, 2002	Socorro	LINEAR	GEF	2.6 km	MPC · JPL
135586	2002 GN_{104}	—	April 10, 2002	Socorro	LINEAR	V	1.0 km	MPC · JPL
135587	2002 GX_{105}	—	April 11, 2002	Anderson Mesa	LONEOS	GEF	2.6 km	MPC · JPL
135588	2002 GP_{111}	—	April 10, 2002	Socorro	LINEAR	·	1.2 km	MPC · JPL
135589	2002 GO_{112}	—	April 10, 2002	Socorro	LINEAR	·	1.7 km	MPC · JPL
135590	2002 GU_{113}	—	April 11, 2002	Socorro	LINEAR	·	1.1 km	MPC · JPL
135591	2002 GC_{117}	—	April 11, 2002	Socorro	LINEAR	V	1.0 km	MPC · JPL
135592	2002 GX_{124}	—	April 12, 2002	Socorro	LINEAR	·	1.2 km	MPC · JPL
135593	2002 GW_{125}	—	April 12, 2002	Socorro	LINEAR	L4	12 km	MPC · JPL
135594	2002 GK_{147}	—	April 13, 2002	Palomar	NEAT	L4	17 km	MPC · JPL
135595	2002 GS_{159}	—	April 14, 2002	Socorro	LINEAR	·	1.2 km	MPC · JPL
135596	2002 GU_{168}	—	April 9, 2002	Socorro	LINEAR	·	2.6 km	MPC · JPL
135597	2002 GK_{169}	—	April 9, 2002	Socorro	LINEAR	·	980 m	MPC · JPL
135598	2002 GP_{172}	—	April 10, 2002	Socorro	LINEAR	·	1.4 km	MPC · JPL
135599	2002 HU	—	April 16, 2002	Desert Eagle	W. K. Y. Yeung	·	2.2 km	MPC · JPL
135600	2002 HM_{1}	—	April 16, 2002	Socorro	LINEAR	·	1.5 km	MPC · JPL

== 135601–135700 ==
back to top

Designation			Discovery			Properties		Ref
Permanent	Provisional	Named after	Date	Site	Discoverer(s)	Category	Diam.	Ref
135601	2002 HG_{5}	—	April 16, 2002	Socorro	LINEAR	·	1.4 km	MPC · JPL
135602	2002 HX_{9}	—	April 17, 2002	Socorro	LINEAR	V	1.1 km	MPC · JPL
135603	2002 HC_{12}	—	April 29, 2002	Palomar	NEAT	·	1.1 km	MPC · JPL
135604	2002 JL_{15}	—	May 8, 2002	Socorro	LINEAR	(2076)	1.5 km	MPC · JPL
135605	2002 JO_{18}	—	May 7, 2002	Palomar	NEAT	GEF	1.9 km	MPC · JPL
135606	2002 JT_{18}	—	May 7, 2002	Palomar	NEAT	·	1.5 km	MPC · JPL
135607	2002 JQ_{21}	—	May 9, 2002	Desert Eagle	W. K. Y. Yeung	·	2.0 km	MPC · JPL
135608	2002 JP_{23}	—	May 8, 2002	Socorro	LINEAR	·	1.7 km	MPC · JPL
135609	2002 JP_{25}	—	May 8, 2002	Socorro	LINEAR	·	1.2 km	MPC · JPL
135610	2002 JS_{26}	—	May 8, 2002	Socorro	LINEAR	·	2.2 km	MPC · JPL
135611	2002 JT_{26}	—	May 8, 2002	Socorro	LINEAR	(2076)	1.5 km	MPC · JPL
135612	2002 JE_{27}	—	May 8, 2002	Socorro	LINEAR	NYS	2.1 km	MPC · JPL
135613	2002 JN_{28}	—	May 9, 2002	Socorro	LINEAR	·	1.7 km	MPC · JPL
135614	2002 JO_{31}	—	May 9, 2002	Socorro	LINEAR	BAP	1.7 km	MPC · JPL
135615	2002 JC_{32}	—	May 9, 2002	Socorro	LINEAR	NYS	1.7 km	MPC · JPL
135616	2002 JJ_{39}	—	May 9, 2002	Desert Eagle	W. K. Y. Yeung	NYS	1.6 km	MPC · JPL
135617	2002 JG_{43}	—	May 9, 2002	Socorro	LINEAR	·	1.8 km	MPC · JPL
135618	2002 JG_{49}	—	May 9, 2002	Socorro	LINEAR	·	1.7 km	MPC · JPL
135619	2002 JR_{51}	—	May 9, 2002	Socorro	LINEAR	NYS	2.1 km	MPC · JPL
135620	2002 JY_{56}	—	May 9, 2002	Socorro	LINEAR	V	1.2 km	MPC · JPL
135621	2002 JF_{61}	—	May 8, 2002	Socorro	LINEAR	·	1.5 km	MPC · JPL
135622	2002 JX_{61}	—	May 8, 2002	Socorro	LINEAR	·	3.2 km	MPC · JPL
135623	2002 JR_{67}	—	May 9, 2002	Socorro	LINEAR	H	1.1 km	MPC · JPL
135624	2002 JZ_{68}	—	May 7, 2002	Socorro	LINEAR	·	1.4 km	MPC · JPL
135625	2002 JR_{71}	—	May 8, 2002	Socorro	LINEAR	·	1.7 km	MPC · JPL
135626	2002 JG_{72}	—	May 8, 2002	Socorro	LINEAR	V	1.1 km	MPC · JPL
135627	2002 JU_{76}	—	May 11, 2002	Socorro	LINEAR	·	1.3 km	MPC · JPL
135628	2002 JV_{77}	—	May 11, 2002	Socorro	LINEAR	·	1.2 km	MPC · JPL
135629	2002 JZ_{77}	—	May 11, 2002	Socorro	LINEAR	·	1.8 km	MPC · JPL
135630	2002 JS_{80}	—	May 11, 2002	Socorro	LINEAR	V	1.1 km	MPC · JPL
135631	2002 JS_{81}	—	May 11, 2002	Socorro	LINEAR	V	1.2 km	MPC · JPL
135632	2002 JK_{83}	—	May 11, 2002	Socorro	LINEAR	·	1.9 km	MPC · JPL
135633	2002 JL_{83}	—	May 11, 2002	Socorro	LINEAR	·	1.5 km	MPC · JPL
135634	2002 JP_{84}	—	May 11, 2002	Socorro	LINEAR	·	1.6 km	MPC · JPL
135635	2002 JA_{86}	—	May 11, 2002	Socorro	LINEAR	V	890 m	MPC · JPL
135636	2002 JS_{89}	—	May 11, 2002	Socorro	LINEAR	·	1.2 km	MPC · JPL
135637	2002 JX_{91}	—	May 11, 2002	Socorro	LINEAR	·	1.7 km	MPC · JPL
135638	2002 JJ_{92}	—	May 11, 2002	Socorro	LINEAR	·	1.2 km	MPC · JPL
135639	2002 JX_{95}	—	May 11, 2002	Socorro	LINEAR	·	2.1 km	MPC · JPL
135640	2002 JT_{98}	—	May 8, 2002	Anderson Mesa	LONEOS	·	1.1 km	MPC · JPL
135641	2002 JH_{100}	—	May 6, 2002	Socorro	LINEAR	PHO	1.8 km	MPC · JPL
135642	2002 JD_{102}	—	May 9, 2002	Socorro	LINEAR	·	2.0 km	MPC · JPL
135643	2002 JM_{109}	—	May 11, 2002	Socorro	LINEAR	NYS	1.6 km	MPC · JPL
135644	2002 JZ_{109}	—	May 11, 2002	Socorro	LINEAR	·	1.9 km	MPC · JPL
135645	2002 JE_{132}	—	May 9, 2002	Socorro	LINEAR	·	1.4 km	MPC · JPL
135646	2002 JG_{133}	—	May 9, 2002	Socorro	LINEAR	(2076)	1.4 km	MPC · JPL
135647	2002 KB_{4}	—	May 16, 2002	Palomar	NEAT	·	2.7 km	MPC · JPL
135648	2002 KQ_{4}	—	May 16, 2002	Socorro	LINEAR	·	2.3 km	MPC · JPL
135649	2002 KQ_{12}	—	May 17, 2002	Socorro	LINEAR	NYS	1.7 km	MPC · JPL
135650	2002 LH_{4}	—	June 5, 2002	Socorro	LINEAR	PHO	3.0 km	MPC · JPL
135651	2002 LM_{6}	—	June 1, 2002	Socorro	LINEAR	·	1.6 km	MPC · JPL
135652	2002 LT_{11}	—	June 5, 2002	Socorro	LINEAR	·	2.1 km	MPC · JPL
135653	2002 LE_{13}	—	June 5, 2002	Socorro	LINEAR	·	2.6 km	MPC · JPL
135654	2002 LT_{19}	—	June 6, 2002	Socorro	LINEAR	·	1.8 km	MPC · JPL
135655	2002 LC_{20}	—	June 6, 2002	Socorro	LINEAR	·	2.3 km	MPC · JPL
135656	2002 LX_{26}	—	June 7, 2002	Socorro	LINEAR	V	1.1 km	MPC · JPL
135657	2002 LQ_{27}	—	June 9, 2002	Socorro	LINEAR	·	1.5 km	MPC · JPL
135658	2002 LD_{49}	—	June 12, 2002	Socorro	LINEAR	·	3.5 km	MPC · JPL
135659	2002 LE_{51}	—	June 9, 2002	Socorro	LINEAR	·	1.7 km	MPC · JPL
135660	2002 LP_{55}	—	June 12, 2002	Socorro	LINEAR	·	4.7 km	MPC · JPL
135661	2002 LC_{60}	—	June 10, 2002	Socorro	LINEAR	·	6.2 km	MPC · JPL
135662 Michelacastello	2002 MA_{1}	Michelacastello	June 19, 2002	Campo Imperatore	M. Tombelli, F. Bernardi	·	5.4 km	MPC · JPL
135663	2002 ND_{1}	—	July 5, 2002	Reedy Creek	J. Broughton	·	2.4 km	MPC · JPL
135664	2002 NH_{4}	—	July 3, 2002	Palomar	NEAT	·	2.1 km	MPC · JPL
135665	2002 NO_{13}	—	July 4, 2002	Palomar	NEAT	NYS	1.6 km	MPC · JPL
135666	2002 NP_{14}	—	July 4, 2002	Palomar	NEAT	·	2.9 km	MPC · JPL
135667	2002 NF_{20}	—	July 9, 2002	Socorro	LINEAR	EUN	3.5 km	MPC · JPL
135668	2002 NT_{20}	—	July 9, 2002	Socorro	LINEAR	·	2.2 km	MPC · JPL
135669	2002 ND_{23}	—	July 9, 2002	Socorro	LINEAR	·	5.5 km	MPC · JPL
135670	2002 NY_{24}	—	July 9, 2002	Socorro	LINEAR	MAR	2.3 km	MPC · JPL
135671	2002 NS_{25}	—	July 9, 2002	Socorro	LINEAR	·	4.9 km	MPC · JPL
135672	2002 NZ_{25}	—	July 9, 2002	Socorro	LINEAR	·	2.2 km	MPC · JPL
135673	2002 NX_{26}	—	July 9, 2002	Socorro	LINEAR	·	1.4 km	MPC · JPL
135674	2002 ND_{31}	—	July 15, 2002	Reedy Creek	J. Broughton	NYS	3.6 km	MPC · JPL
135675	2002 NU_{31}	—	July 9, 2002	Palomar	NEAT	EUN	2.5 km	MPC · JPL
135676	2002 NS_{40}	—	July 14, 2002	Palomar	NEAT	NYS	1.8 km	MPC · JPL
135677	2002 NG_{42}	—	July 14, 2002	Palomar	NEAT	·	2.0 km	MPC · JPL
135678	2002 ND_{49}	—	July 15, 2002	Palomar	NEAT	·	2.1 km	MPC · JPL
135679	2002 NW_{51}	—	July 14, 2002	Socorro	LINEAR	MAS	1.5 km	MPC · JPL
135680	2002 NF_{54}	—	July 5, 2002	Socorro	LINEAR	·	1.6 km	MPC · JPL
135681	2002 NM_{56}	—	July 9, 2002	Socorro	LINEAR	·	3.4 km	MPC · JPL
135682	2002 OZ_{1}	—	July 17, 2002	Socorro	LINEAR	·	4.1 km	MPC · JPL
135683	2002 OW_{3}	—	July 17, 2002	Socorro	LINEAR	·	5.1 km	MPC · JPL
135684	2002 OK_{4}	—	July 18, 2002	Needville	J. Dellinger, J. Ellis	V	1.2 km	MPC · JPL
135685	2002 OM_{6}	—	July 20, 2002	Palomar	NEAT	·	2.1 km	MPC · JPL
135686	2002 OK_{8}	—	July 18, 2002	Palomar	NEAT	MAS	1.4 km	MPC · JPL
135687	2002 OT_{12}	—	July 17, 2002	Socorro	LINEAR	·	7.8 km	MPC · JPL
135688	2002 OK_{17}	—	July 18, 2002	Socorro	LINEAR	·	2.0 km	MPC · JPL
135689	2002 OQ_{17}	—	July 18, 2002	Socorro	LINEAR	MAR	2.6 km	MPC · JPL
135690	2002 OO_{18}	—	July 18, 2002	Socorro	LINEAR	·	2.9 km	MPC · JPL
135691	2002 OS_{20}	—	July 22, 2002	Palomar	NEAT	·	3.4 km	MPC · JPL
135692	2002 OP_{25}	—	July 30, 2002	Haleakala	Lowe, A.	·	1.9 km	MPC · JPL
135693	2002 OB_{26}	—	July 23, 2002	Palomar	NEAT	·	1.6 km	MPC · JPL
135694	2002 OK_{26}	—	July 21, 2002	Palomar	NEAT	·	2.3 km	MPC · JPL
135695 Dragomirescu	2002 PK	Dragomirescu	August 1, 2002	Campo Imperatore	CINEOS	·	2.8 km	MPC · JPL
135696	2002 PX_{4}	—	August 4, 2002	Palomar	NEAT	·	2.9 km	MPC · JPL
135697	2002 PC_{16}	—	August 6, 2002	Palomar	NEAT	·	2.0 km	MPC · JPL
135698	2002 PS_{16}	—	August 6, 2002	Palomar	NEAT	·	3.0 km	MPC · JPL
135699	2002 PH_{17}	—	August 6, 2002	Palomar	NEAT	MAS	1.1 km	MPC · JPL
135700	2002 PV_{18}	—	August 6, 2002	Palomar	NEAT	·	4.2 km	MPC · JPL

== 135701–135800 ==
back to top

Designation			Discovery			Properties		Ref
Permanent	Provisional	Named after	Date	Site	Discoverer(s)	Category	Diam.	Ref
135701	2002 PB_{24}	—	August 6, 2002	Palomar	NEAT	·	1.9 km	MPC · JPL
135702	2002 PC_{29}	—	August 6, 2002	Palomar	NEAT	·	2.6 km	MPC · JPL
135703	2002 PP_{37}	—	August 5, 2002	Socorro	LINEAR	·	2.4 km	MPC · JPL
135704	2002 PH_{39}	—	August 7, 2002	Palomar	NEAT	MAS	1.2 km	MPC · JPL
135705	2002 PM_{40}	—	August 8, 2002	Palomar	NEAT	·	3.3 km	MPC · JPL
135706	2002 PM_{41}	—	August 5, 2002	Socorro	LINEAR	MAR ·	3.8 km	MPC · JPL
135707	2002 PS_{41}	—	August 5, 2002	Socorro	LINEAR	·	2.8 km	MPC · JPL
135708	2002 PO_{44}	—	August 5, 2002	Socorro	LINEAR	·	4.7 km	MPC · JPL
135709	2002 PA_{46}	—	August 9, 2002	Socorro	LINEAR	·	2.6 km	MPC · JPL
135710	2002 PC_{46}	—	August 9, 2002	Socorro	LINEAR	·	2.8 km	MPC · JPL
135711	2002 PF_{48}	—	August 10, 2002	Socorro	LINEAR	EUN	2.1 km	MPC · JPL
135712	2002 PJ_{48}	—	August 10, 2002	Socorro	LINEAR	slow	8.9 km	MPC · JPL
135713	2002 PQ_{48}	—	August 10, 2002	Socorro	LINEAR	·	3.6 km	MPC · JPL
135714	2002 PT_{49}	—	August 10, 2002	Socorro	LINEAR	·	2.3 km	MPC · JPL
135715	2002 PW_{56}	—	August 9, 2002	Socorro	LINEAR	EUN	2.3 km	MPC · JPL
135716	2002 PZ_{56}	—	August 9, 2002	Socorro	LINEAR	·	2.5 km	MPC · JPL
135717	2002 PS_{58}	—	August 10, 2002	Socorro	LINEAR	EUN	1.9 km	MPC · JPL
135718	2002 PO_{61}	—	August 11, 2002	Socorro	LINEAR	·	6.6 km	MPC · JPL
135719	2002 PK_{68}	—	August 6, 2002	Palomar	NEAT	·	2.7 km	MPC · JPL
135720	2002 PH_{75}	—	August 12, 2002	Socorro	LINEAR	·	2.4 km	MPC · JPL
135721	2002 PR_{77}	—	August 11, 2002	Haleakala	NEAT	·	2.5 km	MPC · JPL
135722	2002 PV_{80}	—	August 11, 2002	Palomar	NEAT	·	4.0 km	MPC · JPL
135723	2002 PG_{91}	—	August 13, 2002	Socorro	LINEAR	·	2.5 km	MPC · JPL
135724	2002 PY_{94}	—	August 12, 2002	Haleakala	NEAT	·	2.2 km	MPC · JPL
135725	2002 PN_{99}	—	August 14, 2002	Socorro	LINEAR	·	3.4 km	MPC · JPL
135726	2002 PK_{101}	—	August 12, 2002	Socorro	LINEAR	·	1.9 km	MPC · JPL
135727	2002 PJ_{107}	—	August 12, 2002	Haleakala	NEAT	MAS	1.7 km	MPC · JPL
135728	2002 PN_{117}	—	August 15, 2002	Socorro	LINEAR	EUN	2.5 km	MPC · JPL
135729	2002 PR_{117}	—	August 15, 2002	Socorro	LINEAR	·	2.9 km	MPC · JPL
135730	2002 PX_{118}	—	August 13, 2002	Anderson Mesa	LONEOS	·	7.7 km	MPC · JPL
135731	2002 PF_{124}	—	August 13, 2002	Kitt Peak	Spacewatch	·	1.9 km	MPC · JPL
135732	2002 PY_{126}	—	August 14, 2002	Socorro	LINEAR	NYS	2.7 km	MPC · JPL
135733	2002 PE_{129}	—	August 14, 2002	Socorro	LINEAR	ADE	4.6 km	MPC · JPL
135734	2002 PW_{129}	—	August 15, 2002	Anderson Mesa	LONEOS	·	4.7 km	MPC · JPL
135735	2002 PS_{131}	—	August 15, 2002	Socorro	LINEAR	·	3.2 km	MPC · JPL
135736	2002 PS_{139}	—	August 13, 2002	Socorro	LINEAR	·	2.5 km	MPC · JPL
135737	2002 PV_{140}	—	August 14, 2002	Siding Spring	R. H. McNaught	·	2.4 km	MPC · JPL
135738	2002 PX_{140}	—	August 14, 2002	Siding Spring	R. H. McNaught	·	2.9 km	MPC · JPL
135739	2002 PT_{150}	—	August 9, 2002	Cerro Tololo	Deep Ecliptic Survey	·	1.9 km	MPC · JPL
135740	2002 PF_{158}	—	August 8, 2002	Palomar	S. F. Hönig	·	2.4 km	MPC · JPL
135741	2002 PV_{165}	—	August 8, 2002	Palomar	Lowe, A.	·	2.5 km	MPC · JPL
135742	2002 PB_{171}	—	August 5, 2002	Mauna Kea	Mauna Kea	res · 4:7	153 km	MPC · JPL
135743	2002 PU_{175}	—	August 11, 2002	Palomar	NEAT	·	2.3 km	MPC · JPL
135744	2002 QH_{4}	—	August 16, 2002	Haleakala	NEAT	(5)	2.2 km	MPC · JPL
135745	2002 QW_{5}	—	August 17, 2002	Tenagra	Tenagra	·	7.7 km	MPC · JPL
135746	2002 QR_{7}	—	August 16, 2002	Palomar	NEAT	·	2.4 km	MPC · JPL
135747	2002 QV_{7}	—	August 19, 2002	Haleakala	NEAT	·	2.7 km	MPC · JPL
135748	2002 QF_{10}	—	August 24, 2002	Palomar	NEAT	·	2.7 km	MPC · JPL
135749	2002 QA_{17}	—	August 27, 2002	Palomar	NEAT	MAR	2.1 km	MPC · JPL
135750	2002 QM_{18}	—	August 26, 2002	Palomar	NEAT	·	2.0 km	MPC · JPL
135751	2002 QT_{20}	—	August 28, 2002	Palomar	NEAT	·	4.4 km	MPC · JPL
135752	2002 QQ_{22}	—	August 27, 2002	Palomar	NEAT	·	1.6 km	MPC · JPL
135753	2002 QU_{44}	—	August 30, 2002	Kitt Peak	Spacewatch	·	3.4 km	MPC · JPL
135754	2002 QQ_{58}	—	August 17, 2002	Palomar	NEAT	MAR	2.0 km	MPC · JPL
135755	2002 QL_{79}	—	August 16, 2002	Palomar	NEAT	·	2.0 km	MPC · JPL
135756	2002 RN	—	September 2, 2002	Ondřejov	P. Pravec, P. Kušnirák	·	3.8 km	MPC · JPL
135757	2002 RG_{15}	—	September 4, 2002	Anderson Mesa	LONEOS	·	1.4 km	MPC · JPL
135758	2002 RP_{15}	—	September 4, 2002	Anderson Mesa	LONEOS	·	1.9 km	MPC · JPL
135759	2002 RN_{17}	—	September 4, 2002	Anderson Mesa	LONEOS	·	2.0 km	MPC · JPL
135760	2002 RY_{18}	—	September 4, 2002	Anderson Mesa	LONEOS	·	6.9 km	MPC · JPL
135761	2002 RZ_{20}	—	September 4, 2002	Anderson Mesa	LONEOS	·	3.6 km	MPC · JPL
135762	2002 RC_{21}	—	September 4, 2002	Anderson Mesa	LONEOS	·	2.0 km	MPC · JPL
135763	2002 RV_{22}	—	September 4, 2002	Anderson Mesa	LONEOS	·	2.8 km	MPC · JPL
135764	2002 RD_{28}	—	September 5, 2002	Socorro	LINEAR	·	3.0 km	MPC · JPL
135765	2002 RA_{29}	—	September 3, 2002	Haleakala	NEAT	·	2.3 km	MPC · JPL
135766	2002 RA_{30}	—	September 4, 2002	Anderson Mesa	LONEOS	·	2.2 km	MPC · JPL
135767	2002 RM_{30}	—	September 4, 2002	Anderson Mesa	LONEOS	·	2.4 km	MPC · JPL
135768	2002 RH_{35}	—	September 4, 2002	Anderson Mesa	LONEOS	·	3.4 km	MPC · JPL
135769	2002 RJ_{35}	—	September 4, 2002	Anderson Mesa	LONEOS	·	4.1 km	MPC · JPL
135770	2002 RW_{37}	—	September 5, 2002	Anderson Mesa	LONEOS	RAF	1.8 km	MPC · JPL
135771	2002 RH_{41}	—	September 5, 2002	Socorro	LINEAR	·	2.4 km	MPC · JPL
135772	2002 RY_{43}	—	September 5, 2002	Socorro	LINEAR	·	1.5 km	MPC · JPL
135773	2002 RB_{47}	—	September 5, 2002	Socorro	LINEAR	·	3.3 km	MPC · JPL
135774	2002 RB_{50}	—	September 5, 2002	Socorro	LINEAR	·	2.9 km	MPC · JPL
135775	2002 RB_{54}	—	September 5, 2002	Socorro	LINEAR	·	3.7 km	MPC · JPL
135776	2002 RY_{56}	—	September 5, 2002	Anderson Mesa	LONEOS	·	2.7 km	MPC · JPL
135777	2002 RG_{61}	—	September 5, 2002	Socorro	LINEAR	·	2.0 km	MPC · JPL
135778	2002 RA_{63}	—	September 5, 2002	Socorro	LINEAR	MIS	5.5 km	MPC · JPL
135779	2002 RK_{65}	—	September 5, 2002	Socorro	LINEAR	·	2.2 km	MPC · JPL
135780	2002 RB_{67}	—	September 3, 2002	Palomar	NEAT	·	5.9 km	MPC · JPL
135781	2002 RF_{74}	—	September 5, 2002	Socorro	LINEAR	·	2.5 km	MPC · JPL
135782	2002 RA_{78}	—	September 5, 2002	Socorro	LINEAR	·	3.5 km	MPC · JPL
135783	2002 RX_{79}	—	September 5, 2002	Socorro	LINEAR	·	1.9 km	MPC · JPL
135784	2002 RZ_{81}	—	September 5, 2002	Socorro	LINEAR	THM	3.9 km	MPC · JPL
135785	2002 RH_{84}	—	September 5, 2002	Socorro	LINEAR	·	2.9 km	MPC · JPL
135786	2002 RL_{84}	—	September 5, 2002	Socorro	LINEAR	·	2.4 km	MPC · JPL
135787	2002 RR_{85}	—	September 5, 2002	Socorro	LINEAR	·	5.5 km	MPC · JPL
135788	2002 RZ_{86}	—	September 5, 2002	Socorro	LINEAR	MAR	2.7 km	MPC · JPL
135789	2002 RL_{92}	—	September 5, 2002	Socorro	LINEAR	·	1.7 km	MPC · JPL
135790	2002 RM_{93}	—	September 5, 2002	Anderson Mesa	LONEOS	·	2.4 km	MPC · JPL
135791	2002 RZ_{93}	—	September 5, 2002	Socorro	LINEAR	·	3.3 km	MPC · JPL
135792	2002 RJ_{95}	—	September 5, 2002	Socorro	LINEAR	PAD	3.2 km	MPC · JPL
135793	2002 RO_{96}	—	September 5, 2002	Socorro	LINEAR	·	4.4 km	MPC · JPL
135794	2002 RC_{97}	—	September 5, 2002	Socorro	LINEAR	EUN	1.8 km	MPC · JPL
135795	2002 RP_{99}	—	September 5, 2002	Socorro	LINEAR	·	2.5 km	MPC · JPL
135796	2002 RM_{100}	—	September 5, 2002	Socorro	LINEAR	EUN	2.4 km	MPC · JPL
135797	2002 RA_{101}	—	September 5, 2002	Socorro	LINEAR	slow?	2.0 km	MPC · JPL
135798	2002 RR_{101}	—	September 5, 2002	Socorro	LINEAR	·	2.0 km	MPC · JPL
135799 Ráczmiklós	2002 RZ_{111}	Ráczmiklós	September 7, 2002	Piszkéstető	K. Sárneczky	·	1.9 km	MPC · JPL
135800	2002 RE_{116}	—	September 6, 2002	Socorro	LINEAR	·	2.9 km	MPC · JPL

== 135801–135900 ==
back to top

Designation			Discovery			Properties		Ref
Permanent	Provisional	Named after	Date	Site	Discoverer(s)	Category	Diam.	Ref
135801	2002 RF_{116}	—	September 6, 2002	Socorro	LINEAR	·	2.6 km	MPC · JPL
135802	2002 RA_{119}	—	September 3, 2002	Palomar	NEAT	HNS	2.3 km	MPC · JPL
135803	2002 RE_{119}	—	September 6, 2002	Socorro	LINEAR	MAR	1.6 km	MPC · JPL
135804	2002 RN_{119}	—	September 6, 2002	Socorro	LINEAR	·	3.0 km	MPC · JPL
135805	2002 RF_{121}	—	September 7, 2002	Socorro	LINEAR	·	5.8 km	MPC · JPL
135806	2002 RY_{121}	—	September 8, 2002	Haleakala	NEAT	·	3.1 km	MPC · JPL
135807	2002 RJ_{131}	—	September 11, 2002	Palomar	NEAT	·	2.1 km	MPC · JPL
135808	2002 RT_{135}	—	September 10, 2002	Haleakala	NEAT	·	2.7 km	MPC · JPL
135809	2002 RX_{136}	—	September 11, 2002	Haleakala	NEAT	ADE	2.9 km	MPC · JPL
135810	2002 RT_{142}	—	September 11, 2002	Palomar	NEAT	MRX	2.0 km	MPC · JPL
135811	2002 RG_{156}	—	September 11, 2002	Palomar	NEAT	·	3.1 km	MPC · JPL
135812	2002 RL_{169}	—	September 13, 2002	Palomar	NEAT	MIS	2.6 km	MPC · JPL
135813	2002 RP_{172}	—	September 13, 2002	Palomar	NEAT	EUN	2.0 km	MPC · JPL
135814	2002 RH_{178}	—	September 13, 2002	Kitt Peak	Spacewatch	·	2.0 km	MPC · JPL
135815	2002 RJ_{184}	—	September 12, 2002	Palomar	NEAT	·	2.9 km	MPC · JPL
135816	2002 RR_{186}	—	September 12, 2002	Palomar	NEAT	·	3.8 km	MPC · JPL
135817	2002 RH_{187}	—	September 13, 2002	Palomar	NEAT	·	3.6 km	MPC · JPL
135818	2002 RB_{200}	—	September 13, 2002	Palomar	NEAT	·	3.1 km	MPC · JPL
135819	2002 RQ_{201}	—	September 13, 2002	Socorro	LINEAR	·	1.5 km	MPC · JPL
135820	2002 RN_{202}	—	September 13, 2002	Palomar	NEAT	ADE	3.4 km	MPC · JPL
135821	2002 RO_{203}	—	September 14, 2002	Palomar	NEAT	·	1.6 km	MPC · JPL
135822	2002 RF_{208}	—	September 12, 2002	Palomar	NEAT	·	2.1 km	MPC · JPL
135823	2002 RN_{216}	—	September 13, 2002	Haleakala	NEAT	·	1.6 km	MPC · JPL
135824	2002 RP_{217}	—	September 14, 2002	Palomar	NEAT	(5)	1.5 km	MPC · JPL
135825	2002 RW_{223}	—	September 13, 2002	Palomar	NEAT	·	2.7 km	MPC · JPL
135826	2002 RU_{226}	—	September 14, 2002	Palomar	NEAT	·	1.8 km	MPC · JPL
135827	2002 RB_{229}	—	September 14, 2002	Haleakala	NEAT	·	2.5 km	MPC · JPL
135828	2002 RZ_{229}	—	September 14, 2002	Haleakala	NEAT	·	2.8 km	MPC · JPL
135829	2002 RJ_{233}	—	September 14, 2002	Palomar	R. Matson	(5)	1.6 km	MPC · JPL
135830	2002 RE_{241}	—	September 13, 2002	Palomar	R. Matson	·	1.9 km	MPC · JPL
135831	2002 RC_{243}	—	September 1, 2002	Haleakala	NEAT	·	1.9 km	MPC · JPL
135832	2002 RL_{244}	—	September 5, 2002	Haleakala	NEAT	·	2.2 km	MPC · JPL
135833	2002 RD_{245}	—	September 14, 2002	Palomar	NEAT	·	1.7 km	MPC · JPL
135834	2002 SO	—	September 21, 2002	Pla D'Arguines	R. Ferrando	MAR	3.0 km	MPC · JPL
135835	2002 SZ_{3}	—	September 26, 2002	Palomar	NEAT	slow	3.1 km	MPC · JPL
135836	2002 SX_{9}	—	September 27, 2002	Palomar	NEAT	·	4.1 km	MPC · JPL
135837	2002 SF_{11}	—	September 27, 2002	Palomar	NEAT	·	4.9 km	MPC · JPL
135838	2002 SG_{19}	—	September 27, 2002	Anderson Mesa	LONEOS	·	4.5 km	MPC · JPL
135839	2002 SA_{21}	—	September 26, 2002	Palomar	NEAT	WIT	1.7 km	MPC · JPL
135840	2002 SE_{25}	—	September 28, 2002	Haleakala	NEAT	·	2.8 km	MPC · JPL
135841	2002 SO_{25}	—	September 28, 2002	Haleakala	NEAT	·	5.1 km	MPC · JPL
135842	2002 SX_{30}	—	September 28, 2002	Haleakala	NEAT	·	2.5 km	MPC · JPL
135843	2002 SY_{30}	—	September 28, 2002	Haleakala	NEAT	·	2.0 km	MPC · JPL
135844	2002 SG_{31}	—	September 28, 2002	Haleakala	NEAT	·	2.4 km	MPC · JPL
135845	2002 SK_{32}	—	September 28, 2002	Haleakala	NEAT	·	3.0 km	MPC · JPL
135846	2002 SO_{37}	—	September 29, 2002	Haleakala	NEAT	·	2.1 km	MPC · JPL
135847	2002 SR_{38}	—	September 30, 2002	Socorro	LINEAR	·	2.0 km	MPC · JPL
135848	2002 SN_{42}	—	September 28, 2002	Haleakala	NEAT	·	2.3 km	MPC · JPL
135849	2002 SP_{42}	—	September 28, 2002	Haleakala	NEAT	·	2.9 km	MPC · JPL
135850	2002 SV_{42}	—	September 28, 2002	Haleakala	NEAT	·	4.5 km	MPC · JPL
135851	2002 SA_{47}	—	September 29, 2002	Haleakala	NEAT	·	4.5 km	MPC · JPL
135852	2002 SD_{50}	—	September 30, 2002	Haleakala	NEAT	·	2.0 km	MPC · JPL
135853	2002 SG_{52}	—	September 17, 2002	Palomar	NEAT	·	3.1 km	MPC · JPL
135854	2002 SF_{53}	—	September 18, 2002	Palomar	NEAT	·	3.1 km	MPC · JPL
135855	2002 ST_{53}	—	September 20, 2002	Palomar	NEAT	·	4.0 km	MPC · JPL
135856	2002 SC_{57}	—	September 30, 2002	Socorro	LINEAR	·	3.8 km	MPC · JPL
135857	2002 SY_{57}	—	September 30, 2002	Haleakala	NEAT	·	3.6 km	MPC · JPL
135858	2002 SO_{58}	—	September 30, 2002	Haleakala	NEAT	·	4.0 km	MPC · JPL
135859	2002 TS	—	October 1, 2002	Anderson Mesa	LONEOS	·	3.3 km	MPC · JPL
135860	2002 TD_{3}	—	October 1, 2002	Anderson Mesa	LONEOS	·	2.7 km	MPC · JPL
135861	2002 TG_{4}	—	October 1, 2002	Anderson Mesa	LONEOS	KOR	2.9 km	MPC · JPL
135862	2002 TH_{4}	—	October 1, 2002	Anderson Mesa	LONEOS	MIS	3.9 km	MPC · JPL
135863	2002 TE_{6}	—	October 1, 2002	Socorro	LINEAR	·	3.3 km	MPC · JPL
135864	2002 TA_{10}	—	October 1, 2002	Socorro	LINEAR	·	3.2 km	MPC · JPL
135865	2002 TS_{16}	—	October 2, 2002	Socorro	LINEAR	·	4.6 km	MPC · JPL
135866	2002 TF_{21}	—	October 2, 2002	Socorro	LINEAR	·	3.0 km	MPC · JPL
135867	2002 TL_{23}	—	October 2, 2002	Socorro	LINEAR	·	2.5 km	MPC · JPL
135868	2002 TM_{25}	—	October 2, 2002	Socorro	LINEAR	·	2.8 km	MPC · JPL
135869	2002 TP_{25}	—	October 2, 2002	Socorro	LINEAR	HOF	4.9 km	MPC · JPL
135870	2002 TW_{29}	—	October 2, 2002	Socorro	LINEAR	(12739)	3.0 km	MPC · JPL
135871	2002 TN_{31}	—	October 2, 2002	Socorro	LINEAR	·	3.1 km	MPC · JPL
135872	2002 TL_{32}	—	October 2, 2002	Socorro	LINEAR	·	4.4 km	MPC · JPL
135873	2002 TF_{34}	—	October 2, 2002	Socorro	LINEAR	RAF	1.6 km	MPC · JPL
135874	2002 TJ_{34}	—	October 2, 2002	Socorro	LINEAR	·	4.5 km	MPC · JPL
135875	2002 TY_{34}	—	October 2, 2002	Socorro	LINEAR	·	4.0 km	MPC · JPL
135876	2002 TW_{35}	—	October 2, 2002	Socorro	LINEAR	AGN	1.9 km	MPC · JPL
135877	2002 TR_{36}	—	October 2, 2002	Socorro	LINEAR	·	2.0 km	MPC · JPL
135878	2002 TN_{39}	—	October 2, 2002	Socorro	LINEAR	·	1.8 km	MPC · JPL
135879	2002 TF_{43}	—	October 2, 2002	Socorro	LINEAR	GEF	2.3 km	MPC · JPL
135880	2002 TR_{43}	—	October 2, 2002	Socorro	LINEAR	·	3.6 km	MPC · JPL
135881	2002 TD_{44}	—	October 2, 2002	Socorro	LINEAR	·	4.3 km	MPC · JPL
135882	2002 TH_{46}	—	October 2, 2002	Socorro	LINEAR	·	3.9 km	MPC · JPL
135883	2002 TH_{48}	—	October 2, 2002	Socorro	LINEAR	·	3.6 km	MPC · JPL
135884	2002 TF_{49}	—	October 2, 2002	Socorro	LINEAR	·	4.2 km	MPC · JPL
135885	2002 TX_{49}	—	October 2, 2002	Socorro	LINEAR	·	2.9 km	MPC · JPL
135886	2002 TH_{52}	—	October 2, 2002	Socorro	LINEAR	·	2.5 km	MPC · JPL
135887	2002 TM_{52}	—	October 2, 2002	Socorro	LINEAR	DOR	6.1 km	MPC · JPL
135888	2002 TA_{54}	—	October 2, 2002	Socorro	LINEAR	MRX	2.3 km	MPC · JPL
135889 Trisdalcanton	2002 TN_{61}	Trisdalcanton	October 3, 2002	Campo Imperatore	CINEOS	·	3.9 km	MPC · JPL
135890 Robertodalzotto	2002 TF_{63}	Robertodalzotto	October 3, 2002	Campo Imperatore	CINEOS	·	4.2 km	MPC · JPL
135891	2002 TU_{63}	—	October 4, 2002	Fountain Hills	C. W. Juels, P. R. Holvorcem	·	2.4 km	MPC · JPL
135892	2002 TY_{65}	—	October 4, 2002	Campo Imperatore	CINEOS	·	3.1 km	MPC · JPL
135893	2002 TZ_{71}	—	October 3, 2002	Palomar	NEAT	·	2.1 km	MPC · JPL
135894	2002 TT_{73}	—	October 3, 2002	Palomar	NEAT	·	1.7 km	MPC · JPL
135895	2002 TH_{74}	—	October 3, 2002	Palomar	NEAT	·	5.0 km	MPC · JPL
135896	2002 TG_{76}	—	October 1, 2002	Anderson Mesa	LONEOS	NEM	4.6 km	MPC · JPL
135897	2002 TJ_{76}	—	October 1, 2002	Anderson Mesa	LONEOS	·	3.5 km	MPC · JPL
135898	2002 TO_{77}	—	October 1, 2002	Anderson Mesa	LONEOS	·	3.7 km	MPC · JPL
135899	2002 TR_{77}	—	October 1, 2002	Anderson Mesa	LONEOS	·	2.9 km	MPC · JPL
135900	2002 TJ_{78}	—	October 1, 2002	Anderson Mesa	LONEOS	·	2.6 km	MPC · JPL

== 135901–136000 ==
back to top

Designation			Discovery			Properties		Ref
Permanent	Provisional	Named after	Date	Site	Discoverer(s)	Category	Diam.	Ref
135901	2002 TJ_{80}	—	October 1, 2002	Anderson Mesa	LONEOS	·	3.0 km	MPC · JPL
135902	2002 TF_{83}	—	October 2, 2002	Haleakala	NEAT	·	2.7 km	MPC · JPL
135903	2002 TK_{89}	—	October 3, 2002	Palomar	NEAT	WIT	1.7 km	MPC · JPL
135904	2002 TN_{90}	—	October 3, 2002	Palomar	NEAT	·	5.1 km	MPC · JPL
135905	2002 TR_{90}	—	October 3, 2002	Palomar	NEAT	·	3.8 km	MPC · JPL
135906	2002 TV_{90}	—	October 3, 2002	Palomar	NEAT	·	1.6 km	MPC · JPL
135907	2002 TJ_{100}	—	October 4, 2002	Socorro	LINEAR	·	2.9 km	MPC · JPL
135908	2002 TO_{103}	—	October 4, 2002	Socorro	LINEAR	AGN	2.0 km	MPC · JPL
135909	2002 TG_{105}	—	October 4, 2002	Anderson Mesa	LONEOS	ADE	4.2 km	MPC · JPL
135910 Umbertorepetti	2002 TZ_{110}	Umbertorepetti	October 2, 2002	Campo Imperatore	F. Bernardi	·	2.6 km	MPC · JPL
135911	2002 TZ_{114}	—	October 3, 2002	Palomar	NEAT	·	4.7 km	MPC · JPL
135912	2002 TP_{121}	—	October 3, 2002	Palomar	NEAT	DOR · slow	6.7 km	MPC · JPL
135913	2002 TD_{136}	—	October 4, 2002	Anderson Mesa	LONEOS	·	3.7 km	MPC · JPL
135914	2002 TX_{136}	—	October 4, 2002	Anderson Mesa	LONEOS	·	7.1 km	MPC · JPL
135915	2002 TQ_{137}	—	October 4, 2002	Anderson Mesa	LONEOS	·	4.1 km	MPC · JPL
135916	2002 TN_{139}	—	October 4, 2002	Anderson Mesa	LONEOS	·	3.5 km	MPC · JPL
135917	2002 TW_{147}	—	October 4, 2002	Palomar	NEAT	·	2.8 km	MPC · JPL
135918	2002 TO_{157}	—	October 5, 2002	Palomar	NEAT	ADE	5.1 km	MPC · JPL
135919	2002 TO_{158}	—	October 5, 2002	Palomar	NEAT	·	5.0 km	MPC · JPL
135920	2002 TC_{163}	—	October 5, 2002	Palomar	NEAT	·	3.4 km	MPC · JPL
135921	2002 TS_{167}	—	October 3, 2002	Palomar	NEAT	·	3.0 km	MPC · JPL
135922	2002 TV_{170}	—	October 3, 2002	Palomar	NEAT	·	3.6 km	MPC · JPL
135923	2002 TM_{171}	—	October 3, 2002	Palomar	NEAT	·	4.5 km	MPC · JPL
135924	2002 TJ_{173}	—	October 4, 2002	Socorro	LINEAR	·	3.9 km	MPC · JPL
135925	2002 TP_{175}	—	October 4, 2002	Anderson Mesa	LONEOS	·	2.8 km	MPC · JPL
135926	2002 TW_{179}	—	October 14, 2002	Socorro	LINEAR	AGN	2.3 km	MPC · JPL
135927	2002 TH_{180}	—	October 14, 2002	Socorro	LINEAR	JUN	3.0 km	MPC · JPL
135928	2002 TV_{180}	—	October 14, 2002	Socorro	LINEAR	·	5.9 km	MPC · JPL
135929	2002 TC_{181}	—	October 14, 2002	Socorro	LINEAR	·	3.8 km	MPC · JPL
135930	2002 TQ_{182}	—	October 4, 2002	Palomar	NEAT	·	5.1 km	MPC · JPL
135931	2002 TU_{183}	—	October 4, 2002	Socorro	LINEAR	·	4.1 km	MPC · JPL
135932	2002 TJ_{185}	—	October 4, 2002	Socorro	LINEAR	·	2.9 km	MPC · JPL
135933	2002 TA_{186}	—	October 4, 2002	Socorro	LINEAR	·	4.6 km	MPC · JPL
135934	2002 TU_{186}	—	October 4, 2002	Socorro	LINEAR	·	3.4 km	MPC · JPL
135935	2002 TS_{187}	—	October 4, 2002	Socorro	LINEAR	(5)	2.1 km	MPC · JPL
135936	2002 TO_{190}	—	October 11, 2002	Essen	Essen	EUN	3.1 km	MPC · JPL
135937	2002 TW_{190}	—	October 1, 2002	Socorro	LINEAR	·	4.7 km	MPC · JPL
135938	2002 TV_{191}	—	October 5, 2002	Anderson Mesa	LONEOS	·	1.6 km	MPC · JPL
135939	2002 TJ_{192}	—	October 5, 2002	Anderson Mesa	LONEOS	·	3.7 km	MPC · JPL
135940	2002 TG_{196}	—	October 3, 2002	Socorro	LINEAR	·	2.0 km	MPC · JPL
135941	2002 TJ_{196}	—	October 3, 2002	Socorro	LINEAR	·	3.1 km	MPC · JPL
135942	2002 TA_{198}	—	October 4, 2002	Socorro	LINEAR	·	3.1 km	MPC · JPL
135943	2002 TN_{205}	—	October 4, 2002	Socorro	LINEAR	·	2.5 km	MPC · JPL
135944	2002 TY_{205}	—	October 4, 2002	Socorro	LINEAR	(5)	2.9 km	MPC · JPL
135945	2002 TO_{206}	—	October 4, 2002	Socorro	LINEAR	·	1.9 km	MPC · JPL
135946	2002 TU_{211}	—	October 6, 2002	Haleakala	NEAT	EUN	2.1 km	MPC · JPL
135947	2002 TC_{212}	—	October 6, 2002	Haleakala	NEAT	·	3.1 km	MPC · JPL
135948	2002 TN_{215}	—	October 4, 2002	Socorro	LINEAR	·	3.9 km	MPC · JPL
135949	2002 TQ_{219}	—	October 5, 2002	Socorro	LINEAR	·	2.3 km	MPC · JPL
135950	2002 TZ_{224}	—	October 8, 2002	Anderson Mesa	LONEOS	·	2.0 km	MPC · JPL
135951	2002 TF_{226}	—	October 8, 2002	Anderson Mesa	LONEOS	EUN	1.9 km	MPC · JPL
135952	2002 TJ_{226}	—	October 8, 2002	Anderson Mesa	LONEOS	JUN	2.1 km	MPC · JPL
135953	2002 TS_{226}	—	October 8, 2002	Anderson Mesa	LONEOS	·	3.2 km	MPC · JPL
135954	2002 TS_{232}	—	October 6, 2002	Socorro	LINEAR	·	2.4 km	MPC · JPL
135955	2002 TE_{237}	—	October 6, 2002	Socorro	LINEAR	ADE	6.2 km	MPC · JPL
135956	2002 TA_{238}	—	October 7, 2002	Socorro	LINEAR	·	4.6 km	MPC · JPL
135957	2002 TS_{239}	—	October 9, 2002	Socorro	LINEAR	·	2.8 km	MPC · JPL
135958	2002 TM_{245}	—	October 7, 2002	Haleakala	NEAT	HOF	4.8 km	MPC · JPL
135959	2002 TP_{255}	—	October 9, 2002	Socorro	LINEAR	·	3.5 km	MPC · JPL
135960	2002 TW_{258}	—	October 9, 2002	Socorro	LINEAR	·	3.2 km	MPC · JPL
135961	2002 TK_{260}	—	October 9, 2002	Socorro	LINEAR	·	3.4 km	MPC · JPL
135962	2002 TC_{261}	—	October 9, 2002	Socorro	LINEAR	·	4.3 km	MPC · JPL
135963	2002 TK_{265}	—	October 10, 2002	Socorro	LINEAR	·	3.8 km	MPC · JPL
135964	2002 TN_{266}	—	October 10, 2002	Socorro	LINEAR	·	5.4 km	MPC · JPL
135965	2002 TC_{268}	—	October 9, 2002	Socorro	LINEAR	·	2.2 km	MPC · JPL
135966	2002 TG_{279}	—	October 10, 2002	Socorro	LINEAR	·	5.0 km	MPC · JPL
135967	2002 TD_{281}	—	October 10, 2002	Socorro	LINEAR	·	4.8 km	MPC · JPL
135968	2002 TT_{283}	—	October 10, 2002	Socorro	LINEAR	·	3.4 km	MPC · JPL
135969	2002 TA_{284}	—	October 10, 2002	Socorro	LINEAR	·	1.6 km	MPC · JPL
135970	2002 TE_{284}	—	October 10, 2002	Socorro	LINEAR	·	3.6 km	MPC · JPL
135971	2002 TZ_{284}	—	October 10, 2002	Socorro	LINEAR	·	1.5 km	MPC · JPL
135972	2002 TH_{287}	—	October 10, 2002	Socorro	LINEAR	·	4.4 km	MPC · JPL
135973	2002 TQ_{292}	—	October 10, 2002	Socorro	LINEAR	·	4.2 km	MPC · JPL
135974	2002 TX_{292}	—	October 10, 2002	Socorro	LINEAR	·	3.0 km	MPC · JPL
135975	2002 TL_{294}	—	October 11, 2002	Socorro	LINEAR	AEO	2.1 km	MPC · JPL
135976	2002 TA_{296}	—	October 13, 2002	Palomar	NEAT	·	4.2 km	MPC · JPL
135977	2002 TN_{298}	—	October 12, 2002	Socorro	LINEAR	·	3.1 km	MPC · JPL
135978 Agüeros	2002 TD_{304}	Agüeros	October 4, 2002	Apache Point	SDSS	·	3.2 km	MPC · JPL
135979 Allam	2002 TZ_{368}	Allam	October 10, 2002	Apache Point	SDSS	·	3.2 km	MPC · JPL
135980 Scottanderson	2002 TG_{369}	Scottanderson	October 10, 2002	Apache Point	SDSS	GEF	2.2 km	MPC · JPL
135981	2002 US_{4}	—	October 29, 2002	Socorro	LINEAR	·	5.4 km	MPC · JPL
135982	2002 UO_{8}	—	October 28, 2002	Palomar	NEAT	ADE	4.7 km	MPC · JPL
135983	2002 UD_{9}	—	October 28, 2002	Palomar	NEAT	·	5.0 km	MPC · JPL
135984	2002 UC_{15}	—	October 30, 2002	Socorro	LINEAR	·	9.6 km	MPC · JPL
135985	2002 UV_{16}	—	October 30, 2002	Haleakala	NEAT	·	3.7 km	MPC · JPL
135986	2002 UW_{17}	—	October 30, 2002	Palomar	NEAT	·	2.3 km	MPC · JPL
135987	2002 UC_{19}	—	October 30, 2002	Haleakala	NEAT	NAE	4.7 km	MPC · JPL
135988	2002 UL_{19}	—	October 30, 2002	Haleakala	NEAT	·	3.9 km	MPC · JPL
135989	2002 UN_{22}	—	October 30, 2002	Haleakala	NEAT	AGN	2.7 km	MPC · JPL
135990	2002 UL_{32}	—	October 30, 2002	Haleakala	NEAT	GEF	2.4 km	MPC · JPL
135991 Danarmstrong	2002 UY_{35}	Danarmstrong	October 31, 2002	Jornada	Dixon, D. S.	EUN	2.5 km	MPC · JPL
135992	2002 UY_{45}	—	October 31, 2002	Socorro	LINEAR	·	3.0 km	MPC · JPL
135993	2002 VP_{2}	—	November 1, 2002	Palomar	NEAT	·	3.3 km	MPC · JPL
135994	2002 VY_{20}	—	November 5, 2002	Socorro	LINEAR	EOS	5.4 km	MPC · JPL
135995	2002 VX_{25}	—	November 5, 2002	Socorro	LINEAR	·	4.7 km	MPC · JPL
135996	2002 VY_{25}	—	November 5, 2002	Socorro	LINEAR	·	3.8 km	MPC · JPL
135997	2002 VD_{27}	—	November 5, 2002	Socorro	LINEAR	·	4.2 km	MPC · JPL
135998	2002 VM_{29}	—	November 5, 2002	Socorro	LINEAR	EOS	3.6 km	MPC · JPL
135999	2002 VV_{37}	—	November 5, 2002	Socorro	LINEAR	·	3.8 km	MPC · JPL
136000	2002 VL_{38}	—	November 5, 2002	Socorro	LINEAR	·	1.5 km	MPC · JPL

back to top

== See also ==
- Meanings of minor-planet names: 135001–136000
