= Pagels =

Pagels is a surname. Notable people with the surname include:

- Elaine Pagels (born 1943), American theologian
- Eva Pagels (born 1954), German field hockey player
- Georges-Guillaume Pagels (1855–1897), Swedish officer in the service of the International African Association
- Heinz Pagels (1939–1988), American physicist
- Tietje Spannenburg-Pagels (1906 - after 1933), Dutch speed skater

== See also ==
- Pagel, a surname
