= Gražina Tautvaišienė =

Lithuanian astrophysicist

- Born: November 20th, 1958; Kaunas, Lithuania
- Education: Vilnius University
- Known for: Research on stellar chemical composition and galactic evolution Vice-president at the International Astronomical Union

Gražina Tautvaišienė is a Lithuanian professor in astrophysics known for her research in stellar astrophysics, particularly in the chemical composition of stars and the evolution of the Milky Way galaxy. She is a researcher at Vilnius University. She has served as the Director of the Institute of Theoretical Physics and Astronomy and the Director of the Molėtai Astronomical Observatory. She was elected a member of the Lithuanian Academy of Sciences in 2025.

== Biography ==
Tautvaišienė was born in Kaunas, Lithuania. She became interested in astronomy after taking additional classes in physics and math after 8th grade. She studied astronomy at Vilnius University, where she earned her Master of Science (M.Sc.) degree in 1982. She then became a Ph.D. student at the Institute of Astronomy and Atmospheric Physics in Tartu University, Estonia, obtaining her Ph.D. in 1988 with a focus on the chemical composition of red giant stars. In 2002, she achieved her Doctor Habilitatus degree in Physical Sciences from the Institute of Theoretical Physics and Astronomy of Vilnius University.

During her tenure at ITPA VU, Tautvaišienė progressed through various research and leadership roles. She served as Deputy Director from 1998 to 2003 and again from 2013 to 2018. She was the Director of the institute from 2003 to 2013 and resumed the position from 2018 to 2023. As the Head of the Observatory since 2003, she has overseen significant developments in astronomical research and infrastructure.Lietuvos dangus

In 2024, she was elected as the Vice-President of the International Astronomical Union, becoming the first scientist from the Baltic States to hold this position.

== Research ==
As a graduate student, Tautvaišienė worked with a 6 meter telescope at the Special Astrophysical Observatory of the Russian Academy of Science, which she used to make spectroscopic measurements of stars. During this work she focused on defining the chemical composition of stars. She subsequently has conducted research using the Nordic Optical Telescope. She worked with Bernard Pagel to examine the chemical composition of stars within the Milky Way and other galaxies.

== Awards and honors ==
In 2003 Tautvaišienė was awarded the National Science Prize of Lithuania, the country's highest scientific honor. She was elected to the Lithuanian Academy of Sciences in 2025.

== Selected publications ==
- Pagel, B. E. J.; Tautvaisiene, G. (1997-06-11). "Galactic chemical evolution of primary elements in the solar neighbourhood -- II. Elements affected by the s-process". Monthly Notices of the Royal Astronomical Society. 288 (1): 108–116. doi:10.1093/mnras/288.1.108. ISSN 0035-8711.
- Pagel, B. E. J.; Tautvaišienė, G. (1998-09-01). "Chemical evolution of the Magellanic Clouds: analytical models". Monthly Notices of the Royal Astronomical Society. 299 (2): 535–544. arXiv:astro-ph/9801221. Bibcode:1998MNRAS.299..535P. doi:10.1046/j.1365-8711.1998.01792.x. ISSN 0035-8711.
- Tautvaišienė, G.; Drazdauskas, A.; Mikolaitis, Š; Barisevičius, G.; Puzeras, E.; Stonkut*error*ė, E.; Chorniy, Y.; Magrini, L.; Romano, D.; Smiljanic, R.; Bragaglia, A.; Carraro, G.; Friel, E.; Morel, T.; Pancino, E. (2015-01-01). "The Gaia-ESO Survey: CNO abundances in the open clusters Trumpler 20, NGC 4815, and NGC 6705". Astronomy & Astrophysics. 573: A55. arXiv:1411.2831. Bibcode:2015A&A...573A..55T. doi:10.1051/0004-6361/201424989. ISSN 0004-6361.
- Tautvaišienė, G.; Vázquez, C. Viscasillas; Mikolaitis, Š; Stonkutė, E.; Minkevičiūtė, R.; Drazdauskas, A.; Bagdonas, V. (2021-05-01). "Abundances of neutron-capture elements in thin- and thick-disc stars in the solar neighbourhood". Astronomy & Astrophysics. 649: A126. arXiv:2103.09778. Bibcode:2021A&A...649A.126T. doi:10.1051/0004-6361/202039979. ISSN 0004-6361.
