= Bernard Pagel =

British astronomer

Bernard Pagel

Bernard Ephraim Julius Pagel FRS (4 January 1930 – 14 July 2007) was a British astrophysicist who worked on the measurement and interpretation of elemental abundances in stars and galaxies.

The son of physician and medical historian Walter Pagel and grandson of German physician Julius Leopold Pagel, he was born in Berlin in 1930, but moved with his family to Britain in 1933 to avoid the growing Jewish persecution in Germany at that time. He was educated at Merchant Taylors' School in Northwood and at Sidney Sussex College, Cambridge, from which he graduated with first-class honours in physics in 1950. He remained in Cambridge to pursue his doctoral studies, obtaining his PhD in 1955. He was a research fellow at Sidney Sussex college from 1953 to 1956. In 1956, he moved to the Royal Greenwich Observatory at Herstmonceux Castle, where he spent the greater part of his career, eventually progressing to the grade of deputy chief scientific officer. In 1967, he became a visiting reader (and later visiting professor) in astronomy at Sussex University. Upon his retirement from the Royal Greenwich Observatory in 1990, he moved to a chair at the Nordic Institute for Theoretical Physics (NORDITA) in Copenhagen. He retired for a second time in 1998 and moved back to Sussex, but remained scientifically active up until his death.

In 1990, he was awarded the Gold Medal of the Royal Astronomical Society, the Society's highest award, and in 1992 he was elected a Fellow of the Royal Society.

Pagel died in Ringmer, East Sussex.
