= Walter Pagel =

German pathologist and medical historian

Walter Traugott Ulrich Pagel
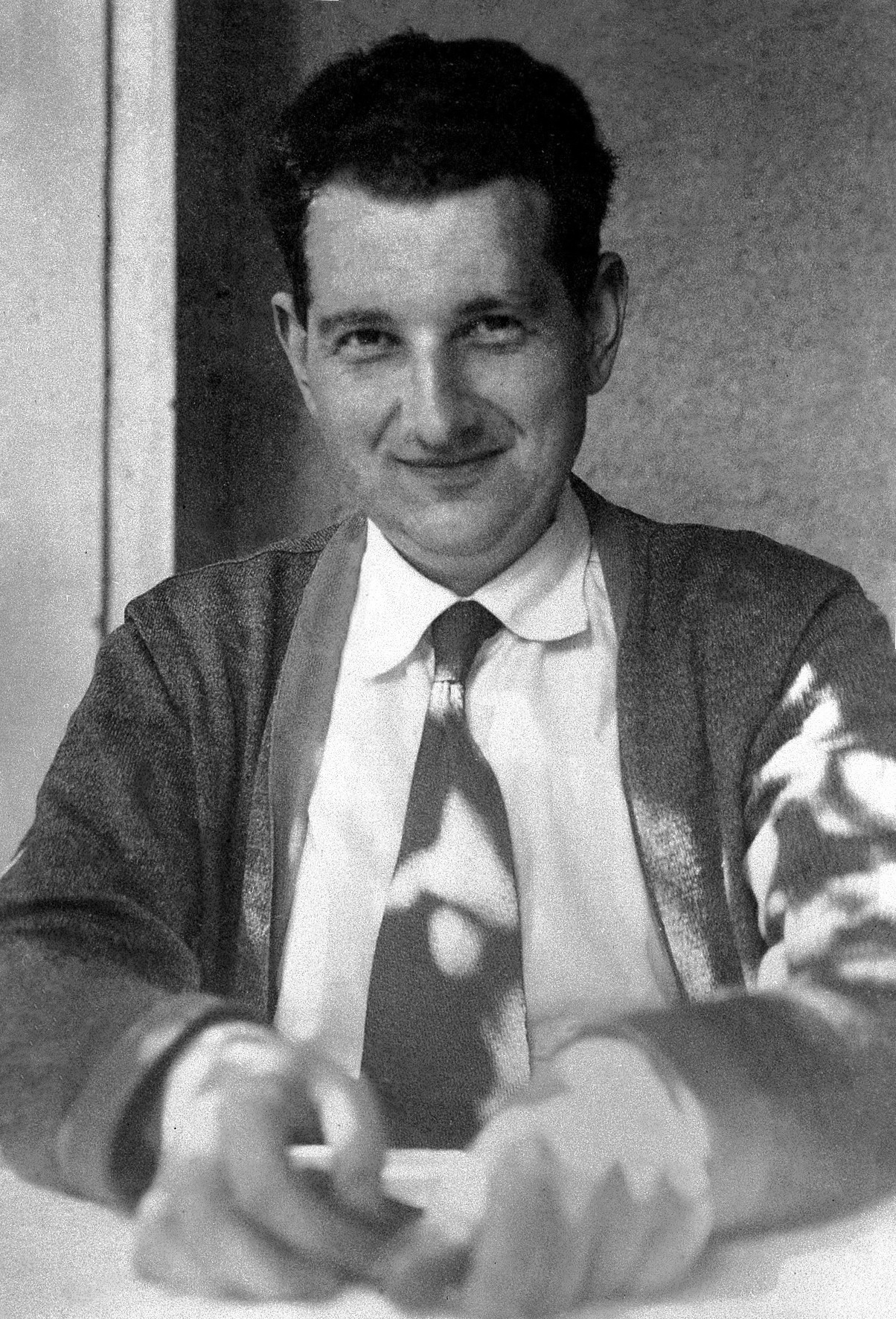
- Walter Pagel c. 1936
- Born: 12 November 1898; Berlin, German Empire
- Died: 25 March 1983 (aged 84); London, England
- Spouse: Magda Koll (−1980)
- Children: Bernard Pagel (1930–2007)
- Parent: Julius Leopold Pagel (1851–1912)
- Relatives: Albert Pagel (brother)

Walter Traugott Ulrich Pagel (12 November 1898 – 25 March 1983) was a German pathologist and medical historian.

== Biography ==
Pagel was born in Berlin, the son of the famous physician and historian of medicine Julius Leopold Pagel. He married Dr. Magda Koll in 1920 and with her had a son, Bernard, in 1930. Pagel took his doctorate in Berlin in 1922 and became professor in Heidelberg in 1931. The family moved to Britain in 1933 for fear of persecution as Jews. Pagel practiced as Consultant Pathologist to the Central Middlesex Hospital, Harlesden, in Greater London From 1939 to 1956, and continued at the Clare Hall Hospital, Barnet, Hertfordshire from 1956 to 1967, when he retired. Following his retirement he began to devote his efforts to writing the history of medicine.

Walter Pagel died in Mill Hill in 1983.

== Selected publications ==
- The Religious and Philosophical Aspects of Van Helmont’s Science and Medicine, Baltimore: The Johns Hopkins Press, 1944.
- Paracelsus: An Introduction to Philosophical Medicine in the Era of the Renaissance, New York: Karger, 1958; 2nd. ed. 1982 ISBN 380553518X; French and German translations 1962.
- William Harvey's Biological Ideas: Selected Aspects and Historical Background, New York: Karger, 1967. LCCN 67-75398
- New Light on William Harvey, New York: Karger, 1976. LCCN 77-359541 ISBN 3805522096
- Joan Baptista van Helmont: Reformer of Science and Medicine, Cambridge: Cambridge University Press, 1982.
  - Pagel, Walter (27 June 2002). 2002 pbk reprint. Cambridge University Press. ISBN 0-521-52655-8.
- The Smiling Spleen: Paracelsianism in Storm and Stress, New York: Karger, 1984. ISBN 3805537077

== Awards ==
He was awarded the Dexter Award (1969), the George Sarton Medal (1970), Julius Pagel Medal (1971), the Robert Koch Prize (1973) and in 1976 the William H. Welch Medal along with becoming a Fellow of the British Academy.

In 1979 he was awarded the Paracelsus Ring (with Gotbert Moro).
