= Julius Leopold Pagel =

German physician and historian of medicine

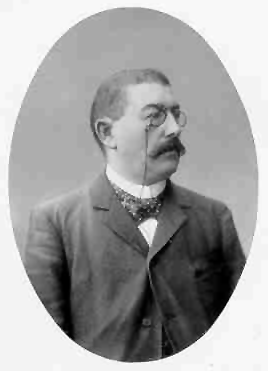
Julius Leopold Pagel

Julius Leopold Pagel (29 May 1851, Pollnow – 30 January 1912, Berlin) was a German physician and historian of medicine.

== Biography ==
Pagel was educated at the gymnasium at Stolp and at the University of Berlin (M.D. 1875). In 1876 he established himself as a physician in Berlin, receiving from the university in that city the venia legendi in 1891, and the title of professor in 1898. In 1902 he became assistant professor of the history of medicine.

From 1885 Pagel was assistant editor of August Hirsch's Biographisches Lexikon der Hervorragenden Ärzte Aller Zeiten und Völker. He was also editor of the Deutsche Ärzte-Zeitung and of the Biographisches Lexikon Hervorragender Ärzte des Neunzehnten Jahrhunderts, Berlin and Vienna, 1901. Beginning in 1899 he was collaborator for medical history on Rudolf Virchow's Jahresbericht über die Leistungen und Fortschritte in der Gesammten Medizin.

Pagel was a member of the Neue Mittwochsgesellschaft (1824–1856), a Berlin literary society founded in 1824 by Julius Eduard Hitzig.

His son Walter Pagel (1898–1983) was also a physician (pathologist) and medical historian.

== Works ==
Among his works may be mentioned:

- Die Anatomic des H. v. Mondeville. Berlin 1889
- Die Chirurgie des H. v. Mondeville. Berlin 1892 (French transl. by E. Nicaise, Paris 1893
- Die Angebliche Chirurgie des Joh. Mesuë. Berlin, 1893
- Medizinische Deontologie. Berlin, 1896
- Neue litterarische Beiträge zur mittelalterlichen Medicin . Reimer, Berlin 1896 Digital edition by the University and State Library Düsseldorf
- Die Entwickelung der Medicin in Berlin von den ältesten Zeiten bis auf die Gegenwart: eine historische Skizze; Festgabe für die Mitglieder und Theilnehmer des 15. Congresses für Innere Medizin. Bergmann, Wiesbaden 1897.
- Geschichte der Medizin Karger, Berlin 1898
- Medizinische Encyclopädie und Methodologie. Berlin 1899
- Biographisches Lexikon hervorragender Ärzte des neunzehnten Jahrhunderts. Urban & Schwarzenberg, Berlin and Vienna 1901
- Handbuch der Geschichte der Medizin. Fischer, Jena 1902–1905
- Zeittafeln zur Geschichte der Medizin. Hirschwald, Berlin 1908

Pagel also wrote essays for the Allgemeine Zeitung des Judenthums, including "Gebet des Maimonides," "Doctor Esra," etc.
