= Meanings of minor-planet names: 134001–135000 =

As minor planet discoveries are confirmed, they are given a permanent number by the IAU's Minor Planet Center (MPC), and the discoverers can then submit names for them, following the IAU's naming conventions. The list below concerns those minor planets in the specified number-range that have received names, and explains the meanings of those names.

Official naming citations of newly named small Solar System bodies are approved and published in a bulletin by IAU's Working Group for Small Bodies Nomenclature (WGSBN). Before May 2021, citations were published in MPC's Minor Planet Circulars for many decades. Recent citations can also be found on the JPL Small-Body Database (SBDB). Until his death in 2016, German astronomer Lutz D. Schmadel compiled these citations into the Dictionary of Minor Planet Names (DMP) and regularly updated the collection.

Based on Paul Herget's The Names of the Minor Planets, Schmadel also researched the unclear origin of numerous asteroids, most of which had been named prior to World War II. This article incorporates text from this source, which is in the public domain: SBDB New namings may only be added to this list below after official publication as the preannouncement of names is condemned. The WGSBN publishes a comprehensive guideline for the naming rules of non-cometary small Solar System bodies.

== 134001–134100 ==
Named minor planet	Provisional	This minor planet was named for...	Ref · Catalog
134003 Ingridgalinsky	2004 VD_{12}	Ingrid Galinsky (born 1962), the Science Processing and Operation Center Test Lead for the OSIRIS-REx asteroid sample-return mission.	JPL · 134003
134008 Davidhammond	2004 VP_{21}	Dave Hammond (born 1983), the Science Processing Lead at the Science Processing and Operations Center for the OSIRIS-REx asteroid sample-return mission.	JPL · 134008
134019 Nathanmogk	2004 VC_{59}	Nathan Mogk (born 1989), a systems engineer at the Science Processing and Operations Center for the OSIRIS-REx asteroid sample-return mission. His previous planetary science work included making DTMs of Mars from HiRISE data and research on three-body-problem dynamics.	JPL · 134019
134027 Deanbooher	2004 VN_{76}	Daniel "Dean" Booher (born 1971) was the Quality Assurance Manager for OCAMS, the OSIRIS-REx Camera Suite, on the OSIRIS-REx asteroid sample-return mission	JPL · 134027
134028 Mikefitzgibbon	2004 VE_{77}	Mike Fitzgibbon (born 1962), an OCAMS Software Engineer for the OSIRIS-REx asteroid sample-return mission and for the Space Shuttle missions with the AIS, GLO and UVSTAR instruments, and for a number of planetary missions including Mars Polar Lander, Mars Odyssey, Phoenix, Lunar Reconnaissance Orbiter, MESSENGER and MSL.	JPL · 134028
134034 Bloomenthal	2004 WV_{7}	H. Philip Bloomenthal (born 1981) worked as a Systems Administrator at the University of Arizona Science Processing and Operations Center for the OSIRIS-REx asteroid sample-return mission. He helped keep the little green lights blinking.	JPL · 134034
134036 Austincummings	2004 XB_{1}	Austin Cummings (born 1995), a software developer at the Science Processing and Operations Center for the OSIRIS-REx asteroid sample-return mission	JPL · 134036
134039 Stephaniebarnes	2004 XX_{8}	Stephanie Barnes (born 1984), the SPOC Science Operations Engineer for the OSIRIS-REx asteroid sample-return mission.	JPL · 134039
134040 Beaubierhaus	2004 XP_{9}	Beau Bierhaus (born 1972) was the science team interface to the spacecraft design and development activities for the OSIRIS-REx asteroid sample-return mission.	JPL · 134040
134044 Chrisshinohara	2004 XA_{14}	Chris Shinohara (born 1965) was the Science Processing and Operations Center Manager for the OSIRIS-REx asteroid sample-return mission at the University of Arizona. He also worked on the Phoenix and Mars Reconnaissance Orbiter missions.	JPL · 134044
134050 Rebeccaghent	2004 XU_{25}	Rebecca Ghent (born 1971), a Co-I for the OSIRIS-REx asteroid sample-return mission. She is also a Co-I for the Diviner thermal radiometer on the Lunar Reconnaissance Orbiter mission, and has contributed to the body of knowledge of planetary impacts, regolith development and tectonics.	JPL · 134050
134063 Damianhammond	2004 XP_{50}	Damian Hammond (born 1972) was the Software Engineering Lead for the Telemetry Processing at the Science Processing and Operations Center, for the OSIRIS-REx asteroid sample-return mission.	JPL · 134063
134069 Miyo	2004 XP_{63}	Miyo Itagaki (1921–2011), mother of Japanese astronomer Kōichi Itagaki, who discovered this minor planet	JPL · 134069
134072 Sharonhooven	2004 XZ_{65}	Sharon Hooven (born 1958), the Senior Business Manager for the OSIRIS-REx asteroid sample-return mission at the University of Arizona.	JPL · 134072
134081 Johnmarshall	2004 XY_{87}	John Marshall (born 1948), the Asteroid Scientist – Regolith for the OSIRIS-REx asteroid sample-return mission.	JPL · 134081
134087 Symeonplatts	2004 XU_{103}	Symeon Platts (born 1991), the Senior Videographer for the OSIRIS-REx asteroid sample-return mission at the University of Arizona.	JPL · 134087
134088 Brettperkins	2004 XF_{104}	Brett Perkins (born 1967), the Launch Site Integration Manager for the OSIRIS-REx asteroid sample-return mission. He served in a similar capacity for the JUNO Jupiter mission and multiple TDRSS missions. During the Space Shuttle Program he served as a test engineer and a NASA Test Director for missions from 1990 through 2011.	JPL · 134088
134091 Jaysoncowley	2004 XU_{110}	Jayson Cowley (born 1959) is the United Launch Alliance Mission Manager for the OSIRIS-REx asteroid sample-return mission. He has supported NASA with Titan- IV, Delta-II and Atlas-V launch services for the MAVEN, LDCM, WISE, STSS-D and Cassini missions.	JPL · 134091
134092 Lindaleematthias	2004 XD_{111}	Linda Lee Matthias (born 1968), the KSC/LSP Contamination Control Engineer for the OSIRIS-REx asteroid sample-return mission. Since 1988 she has supported over 70 successful Titan IV and NASA Launch Services Program Missions as the Planetary Protection and Contamination Control Engineer.	JPL · 134092
134099 Rexengelhardt	2004 XC_{125}	Rex Engelhardt (born 1959), the KSC Launch Services Program Mission Manager for the OSIRIS-REx asteroid sample-return mission. As a Mission Manager, he has led more than 10 missions since LSP was established in 1998. He supported many payload support jobs for NASA Kennedy Space Center and the Air Force.	JPL · 134099

== 134101–134200 ==
back to top

Named minor planet	Provisional	This minor planet was named for...	Ref · Catalog
134105 Josephfust	2004 XY_{145}	Joseph Fust (born 1958), the United Launch Alliance spacecraft integration engineer for the OSIRIS-REx asteroid sample-return mission. He was the spacecraft integration engineer for the MAVEN mission to Mars. He also serves as spacecraft integrator for various United States Air Force and National Security missions.	JPL · 134105
134109 Britneyburch	2004 XN_{159}	Britney Burch (born 1982) is a structural dynamics analyst with the NASA Launch Services Program and is the primary loads analyst for the OSIRIS-REx asteroid sample-return mission. She has previously served as an analyst with the Mars MAVEN mission and the Pegasus/IRIS mission.	JPL · 134109
134112 Jeremyralph	2004 XZ_{169}	Jeremy Ralph (born 1983) is the United Launch Alliance Flight Design Engineer for the Atlas V rocket, launching the OSIRIS-REx asteroid sample-return mission to 101955 Bennu. He also assisted on the SDO, MSL and LDCM missions.	JPL · 134112
134124 Subirachs	2005 AM	Josep Maria Subirachs (1927–2014), Catalan sculptor and painter	JPL · 134124
134125 Shaundaly	2005 AH_{6}	Shaun Daly (born 1979) is the KSC Launch Services Program Integration Engineer for the OSIRIS-REx asteroid sample-return mission. He has served in the aerospace industry since 1997 both for the USAF as a Crew Chief during Operation Enduring Freedom and for NASA as an avionics engineer on 25 missions	JPL · 134125
134127 Basher	2005 AK_{7}	Benjamin Asher (born 1990) is an Embry-Riddle Aeronautical University alumnus and a member of the flight design team at a.i. solutions, Inc. in support of NASA's Launch Services Program for the OSIRIS-REx asteroid sample-return mission. He is also a member of the flight design team in support of the TESS mission.	JPL · 134127
134130 Apáczai	2005 AP_{11}	János Apáczai Csere (1625–1659), Hungarian polyglot and mathematician	JPL · 134130
134131 Skipowens	2005 AT_{11}	Skip Owens (born 1975) is the NASA LSP Integration Engineer for the OSIRIS-REx asteroid sample-return mission. He was also a LSP Flight Design Engineer for over a dozen NASA missions. Before starting with LSP in 2001, he worked spacecraft mission design at Goddard Spaceflight Center for the EO-1 and WMAP missions.	JPL · 134131
134134 Kristoferdrozd	2005 AU_{21}	Kristofer Drozd (born 1993), a systems engineering graduate student at the University of Arizona.	JPL · 134134
134135 Steigerwald	2005 AY_{24}	William Steigerwald (born 1967) worked on the OSIRIS-REx asteroid sample-return mission as a science writer. He has worked for over 19 years as a writer for a wide range of NASA missions in planetary science, astrobiology, astrophysics and heliophysics	JPL · 134135
134138 Laurabayley	2005 AG_{30}	Laura C. Bayley (born 1988) is a student engineer at MIT responsible for test planning and assembly of the student-built Regolith X-ray Imaging Spectrometer aboard the OSIRIS-REx asteroid sample-return mission.	JPL · 134138
134146 Pronoybiswas	2005 AL_{51}	Pronoy K. Biswas (born 1992) is a student engineer at MIT responsible for designing and implementing the avionics system for the student-built Regolith X-ray Imaging Spectrometer aboard the OSIRIS-REx asteroid sample-return mission.	JPL · 134146
134150 Bralower	2005 AU_{57}	Harrison L. Bralower (born 1988) worked as a student engineer at MIT where he designed the detector assembly mount for the student-built Regolith X-ray Imaging Spectrometer aboard the OSIRIS-REx asteroid sample-return mission.	JPL · 134150
134160 Pluis	2005 BE_{3}	Aina Vandenabeele (8 June – 1 December 2004) was the niece of Belgian astronomer Peter De Cat, who discovered this minor planet. Aina, nicknamed "Pluis", died of leukemia. The naming also honors all children with cancer.	JPL · 134160
134169 Davidcarte	2005 BO_{24}	David B. Carte (born 1991) worked as a student engineer at MIT where he was responsible for the structural design and testing of the student-built Regolith X-ray Imaging Spectrometer aboard the OSIRIS-REx asteroid sample-return mission.	JPL · 134169
134174 Jameschen	2005 CU_{9}	Shuyi James Chen (born 1988) worked as a student engineer at MIT where he was the lead avionics and software engineer in the development of the student-built Regolith X-ray Imaging Spectrometer aboard the OSIRIS-REx asteroid sample-return mission.	JPL · 134174
134178 Markchodas	2005 CR_{18}	Mark A. Chodas (born 1990) is a student engineer at MIT working as the Lead Systems Engineer ensuring that all system components meet science requirements for the student-built Regolith X-ray Imaging Spectrometer aboard the OSIRIS-REx asteroid sample-return mission.	JPL · 134178
134180 Nirajinamdar	2005 CN_{22}	Niraj K. Inamdar (born 1986) worked as a student engineer and scientist at MIT where he conducted the performance modeling in the development of the student-built Regolith X-ray Imaging Spectrometer aboard the OSIRIS-REx asteroid sample-return mission.	JPL · 134180

== 134201–134300 ==
back to top

Named minor planet	Provisional	This minor planet was named for...	Ref · Catalog
134244 De Young	2006 AA_{4}	Mike De Young (born 1954), American teacher, who ran the Rehoboth Christian School observatory and is the local liaison for the Calvin-Rehoboth Robotic Observatory	JPL · 134244
134292 Edwardhall	2006 DF_{8}	Edward Hall (1942–2020) earned a Ph.D. at Northwestern University. He was instrumental in the development of silicon-based sensors and gallium arsenide devices at Motorola. Hall later was director of the Arizona State University nanofabrication laboratory and executive associate dean of their School of Engineering.	IAU · 134292

== 134301–134400 ==
back to top

Named minor planet	Provisional	This minor planet was named for...	Ref · Catalog
134329 Cycnos	2377 T-3	Cycnus (or Cycnos), from Greek mythology. He was one of the many sons of Poseidon with a sea nymphs. In the Trojan War he was an ally of King Priam and was strangled by Achilles.	JPL · 134329
134340 Pluto	—	Pluto, Roman god of the Underworld, similar to the Greek Hades (see also (134340) Pluto I Charon, (134340) Pluto II Nix, and (134340) Pluto III Hydra).	MPC · 134340
134346 Pinatubo	1991 PT_{2}	Mount Pinatubo, active volcano on Luzon island in the Philippines	JPL · 134346
134348 Klemperer	1992 UX_{9}	Victor Klemperer (1881–1960), German son of a rabbi, who kept a diary of life under the Nazi tyranny, starting in 1933	JPL · 134348
134369 Sahara	1995 QE	The Sahara desert is the world's largest hot desert. Located in north Africa, it stretches from the Red Sea to the Atlantic Ocean.	JPL · 134369

== 134401–134500 ==
back to top

Named minor planet	Provisional	This minor planet was named for...	Ref · Catalog
134402 Ieshimatoshiaki	1997 RG	Toshiaki Ieshima (born 1955), Japanese amateur astronomer and member of Matsue Astronomy Club. He is an observing partner of Hiroshi Abe who discovered this minor planet.	JPL · 134402
134419 Hippothous	1998 MV_{47}	Hippothous, from Greek mythology. The Trojan prince and his brothers were cursed by their father, King Priam, for their disgraceful behavior after Hector's death during the Trojan War.	JPL · 134419

== 134501–134600 ==
back to top

Named minor planet	Provisional	This minor planet was named for...	Ref · Catalog
There are no named minor planets in this number range

== 134601–134700 ==
back to top

Named minor planet	Provisional	This minor planet was named for...	Ref · Catalog
There are no named minor planets in this number range

== 134701–134800 ==
back to top

Named minor planet	Provisional	This minor planet was named for...	Ref · Catalog
There are no named minor planets in this number range

== 134801–134900 ==
back to top

Named minor planet	Provisional	This minor planet was named for...	Ref · Catalog
There are no named minor planets in this number range

== 134901–135000 ==
back to top

Named minor planet	Provisional	This minor planet was named for...	Ref · Catalog
There are no named minor planets in this number range

back to top

Preceded by 133,001–134,000	Meanings of minor-planet names List of minor planets: 134,001–135,000	Succeeded by 135,001–136,000
