= List of minor planets: 134001–135000 =

The following is a partial list of minor planets, running from minor-planet number 134001 through 135000, inclusive. The primary data for this and other partial lists is based on JPL's "Small-Body Orbital Elements" and data available from the Minor Planet Center. Critical list information is also provided by the MPC, unless otherwise specified from Lowell Observatory. A detailed description of the table's columns and additional sources are given on the main page including a complete list of every page in this series, and a statistical break-up on the dynamical classification of minor planets.

Also see the summary list of all named bodies in numerical and alphabetical order, and the corresponding naming citations for the number range of this particular list. New namings may only be added to this list after official publication, as the preannouncement of names is condemned by the Working Group for Small Bodies Nomenclature of the International Astronomical Union.

Near-Earth obj.	MBA (inner)	MBA (outer)	Centaur
Mars-crosser	MBA (middle)	Jupiter trojan	Trans-Neptunian obj.
Unclassified

== 134001–134100 ==
Designation			Discovery			Properties		Ref
Permanent	Provisional	Named after	Date	Site	Discoverer(s)	Category	Diam.	Ref
134001	2004 VL_{9}	—	November 3, 2004	Anderson Mesa	LONEOS	·	3.7 km	MPC · JPL
134002	2004 VS_{9}	—	November 3, 2004	Anderson Mesa	LONEOS	·	4.8 km	MPC · JPL
134003 Ingridgalinsky	2004 VD_{12}	Ingridgalinsky	November 3, 2004	Catalina	CSS	·	5.0 km	MPC · JPL
134004	2004 VN_{13}	—	November 2, 2004	Anderson Mesa	LONEOS	·	1.4 km	MPC · JPL
134005	2004 VQ_{15}	—	November 4, 2004	Kitt Peak	Spacewatch	·	1.2 km	MPC · JPL
134006	2004 VY_{17}	—	November 3, 2004	Kitt Peak	Spacewatch	(5)	2.2 km	MPC · JPL
134007	2004 VZ_{18}	—	November 4, 2004	Kitt Peak	Spacewatch	·	3.8 km	MPC · JPL
134008 Davidhammond	2004 VP_{21}	Davidhammond	November 4, 2004	Catalina	CSS	WAT	2.5 km	MPC · JPL
134009	2004 VZ_{27}	—	November 5, 2004	Palomar	NEAT	·	2.4 km	MPC · JPL
134010	2004 VW_{28}	—	November 7, 2004	Wrightwood	J. W. Young	·	1.5 km	MPC · JPL
134011	2004 VO_{36}	—	November 4, 2004	Kitt Peak	Spacewatch	·	2.6 km	MPC · JPL
134012	2004 VS_{36}	—	November 4, 2004	Kitt Peak	Spacewatch	·	1.0 km	MPC · JPL
134013	2004 VX_{42}	—	November 4, 2004	Kitt Peak	Spacewatch	·	1.4 km	MPC · JPL
134014	2004 VQ_{48}	—	November 4, 2004	Kitt Peak	Spacewatch	V	1.1 km	MPC · JPL
134015	2004 VY_{52}	—	November 4, 2004	Kitt Peak	Spacewatch	·	1.2 km	MPC · JPL
134016	2004 VU_{53}	—	November 7, 2004	Socorro	LINEAR	T_{j} (2.99) · 3:2	6.2 km	MPC · JPL
134017	2004 VZ_{53}	—	November 7, 2004	Socorro	LINEAR	·	2.1 km	MPC · JPL
134018	2004 VO_{57}	—	November 5, 2004	Palomar	NEAT	·	3.1 km	MPC · JPL
134019 Nathanmogk	2004 VC_{59}	Nathanmogk	November 9, 2004	Catalina	CSS	·	3.3 km	MPC · JPL
134020	2004 VR_{62}	—	November 6, 2004	Socorro	LINEAR	·	2.9 km	MPC · JPL
134021	2004 VY_{62}	—	November 7, 2004	Socorro	LINEAR	·	2.9 km	MPC · JPL
134022	2004 VW_{63}	—	November 10, 2004	Kitt Peak	Spacewatch	HYG	5.4 km	MPC · JPL
134023	2004 VO_{64}	—	November 7, 2004	Socorro	LINEAR	·	1.9 km	MPC · JPL
134024	2004 VN_{65}	—	November 9, 2004	Haleakala	NEAT	MIS	4.7 km	MPC · JPL
134025	2004 VW_{65}	—	November 3, 2004	Kitt Peak	Spacewatch	·	1.9 km	MPC · JPL
134026	2004 VC_{71}	—	November 7, 2004	Socorro	LINEAR	(12739)	2.8 km	MPC · JPL
134027 Deanbooher	2004 VN_{76}	Deanbooher	November 12, 2004	Catalina	CSS	·	1.4 km	MPC · JPL
134028 Mikefitzgibbon	2004 VE_{77}	Mikefitzgibbon	November 12, 2004	Catalina	CSS	·	1.8 km	MPC · JPL
134029	2004 VJ_{85}	—	November 10, 2004	Kitt Peak	Spacewatch	·	2.7 km	MPC · JPL
134030	2004 VT_{90}	—	November 2, 2004	Palomar	NEAT	BRA	2.9 km	MPC · JPL
134031	2004 WY	—	November 17, 2004	Siding Spring	SSS	NYS	2.7 km	MPC · JPL
134032	2004 WC_{5}	—	November 18, 2004	Socorro	LINEAR	·	2.8 km	MPC · JPL
134033	2004 WZ_{6}	—	November 19, 2004	Socorro	LINEAR	·	2.8 km	MPC · JPL
134034 Bloomenthal	2004 WV_{7}	Bloomenthal	November 19, 2004	Catalina	CSS	·	1.7 km	MPC · JPL
134035	2004 WW_{8}	—	November 18, 2004	Socorro	LINEAR	(5)	2.6 km	MPC · JPL
134036 Austincummings	2004 XB_{1}	Austincummings	December 1, 2004	Catalina	CSS	·	5.4 km	MPC · JPL
134037	2004 XP_{3}	—	December 2, 2004	Socorro	LINEAR	·	3.1 km	MPC · JPL
134038	2004 XP_{5}	—	December 2, 2004	Palomar	NEAT	H	1.1 km	MPC · JPL
134039 Stephaniebarnes	2004 XX_{8}	Stephaniebarnes	December 2, 2004	Catalina	CSS	T_{j} (2.97) · 3:2	11 km	MPC · JPL
134040 Beaubierhaus	2004 XP_{9}	Beaubierhaus	December 2, 2004	Catalina	CSS	ADE	3.6 km	MPC · JPL
134041	2004 XC_{12}	—	December 8, 2004	Socorro	LINEAR	·	6.5 km	MPC · JPL
134042	2004 XQ_{12}	—	December 8, 2004	Socorro	LINEAR	GAL	3.4 km	MPC · JPL
134043	2004 XB_{13}	—	December 8, 2004	Socorro	LINEAR	·	4.1 km	MPC · JPL
134044 Chrisshinohara	2004 XA_{14}	Chrisshinohara	December 9, 2004	Catalina	CSS	PHO	2.9 km	MPC · JPL
134045	2004 XE_{22}	—	December 8, 2004	Socorro	LINEAR	·	4.6 km	MPC · JPL
134046	2004 XM_{22}	—	December 8, 2004	Socorro	LINEAR	·	1.4 km	MPC · JPL
134047	2004 XG_{23}	—	December 8, 2004	Socorro	LINEAR	·	2.0 km	MPC · JPL
134048	2004 XH_{23}	—	December 8, 2004	Socorro	LINEAR	·	7.9 km	MPC · JPL
134049	2004 XB_{24}	—	December 9, 2004	Socorro	LINEAR	·	4.1 km	MPC · JPL
134050 Rebeccaghent	2004 XU_{25}	Rebeccaghent	December 9, 2004	Catalina	CSS	·	5.7 km	MPC · JPL
134051	2004 XZ_{26}	—	December 10, 2004	Socorro	LINEAR	(21344)	2.3 km	MPC · JPL
134052	2004 XL_{27}	—	December 10, 2004	Socorro	LINEAR	·	3.7 km	MPC · JPL
134053	2004 XQ_{27}	—	December 10, 2004	Socorro	LINEAR	·	1.3 km	MPC · JPL
134054	2004 XM_{28}	—	December 10, 2004	Socorro	LINEAR	·	3.8 km	MPC · JPL
134055	2004 XD_{36}	—	December 10, 2004	Kitt Peak	Spacewatch	·	1.8 km	MPC · JPL
134056	2004 XB_{37}	—	December 11, 2004	Campo Imperatore	CINEOS	·	1.2 km	MPC · JPL
134057	2004 XT_{37}	—	December 7, 2004	Socorro	LINEAR	PHO	3.0 km	MPC · JPL
134058	2004 XX_{38}	—	December 7, 2004	Socorro	LINEAR	EUN	2.3 km	MPC · JPL
134059	2004 XL_{43}	—	December 10, 2004	Socorro	LINEAR	·	3.0 km	MPC · JPL
134060	2004 XR_{43}	—	December 11, 2004	Campo Imperatore	CINEOS	·	5.2 km	MPC · JPL
134061	2004 XG_{45}	—	December 8, 2004	Socorro	LINEAR	·	3.0 km	MPC · JPL
134062	2004 XH_{48}	—	December 10, 2004	Socorro	LINEAR	·	4.0 km	MPC · JPL
134063 Damianhammond	2004 XP_{50}	Damianhammond	December 9, 2004	Catalina	CSS	SUL	3.4 km	MPC · JPL
134064	2004 XF_{52}	—	December 8, 2004	Socorro	LINEAR	PHO	2.1 km	MPC · JPL
134065	2004 XP_{55}	—	December 10, 2004	Kitt Peak	Spacewatch	·	3.1 km	MPC · JPL
134066	2004 XK_{60}	—	December 12, 2004	Kitt Peak	Spacewatch	·	3.4 km	MPC · JPL
134067	2004 XO_{60}	—	December 12, 2004	Kitt Peak	Spacewatch	NYS	2.5 km	MPC · JPL
134068	2004 XS_{61}	—	December 8, 2004	Socorro	LINEAR	·	1.9 km	MPC · JPL
134069 Miyo	2004 XP_{63}	Miyo	December 13, 2004	Yamagata	K. Itagaki	·	3.5 km	MPC · JPL
134070	2004 XD_{64}	—	December 2, 2004	Kitt Peak	Spacewatch	EOS	3.3 km	MPC · JPL
134071	2004 XL_{65}	—	December 2, 2004	Palomar	NEAT	·	4.9 km	MPC · JPL
134072 Sharonhooven	2004 XZ_{65}	Sharonhooven	December 2, 2004	Catalina	CSS	TIR	4.7 km	MPC · JPL
134073	2004 XL_{66}	—	December 3, 2004	Kitt Peak	Spacewatch	THM	4.5 km	MPC · JPL
134074	2004 XN_{66}	—	December 3, 2004	Kitt Peak	Spacewatch	·	5.0 km	MPC · JPL
134075	2004 XE_{68}	—	December 3, 2004	Kitt Peak	Spacewatch	HYG	5.2 km	MPC · JPL
134076	2004 XW_{69}	—	December 10, 2004	Kitt Peak	Spacewatch	KON	5.3 km	MPC · JPL
134077	2004 XW_{71}	—	December 12, 2004	Kitt Peak	Spacewatch	L5	14 km	MPC · JPL
134078	2004 XX_{76}	—	December 10, 2004	Socorro	LINEAR	MAS	1.0 km	MPC · JPL
134079	2004 XR_{78}	—	December 10, 2004	Socorro	LINEAR	THM	3.9 km	MPC · JPL
134080	2004 XE_{82}	—	December 11, 2004	Kitt Peak	Spacewatch	·	1.8 km	MPC · JPL
134081 Johnmarshall	2004 XY_{87}	Johnmarshall	December 9, 2004	Catalina	CSS	·	5.1 km	MPC · JPL
134082	2004 XN_{89}	—	December 11, 2004	Socorro	LINEAR	·	2.0 km	MPC · JPL
134083	2004 XM_{98}	—	December 11, 2004	Kitt Peak	Spacewatch	·	2.5 km	MPC · JPL
134084	2004 XH_{100}	—	December 13, 2004	Kitt Peak	Spacewatch	·	2.4 km	MPC · JPL
134085	2004 XE_{102}	—	December 10, 2004	Kitt Peak	Spacewatch	·	2.7 km	MPC · JPL
134086	2004 XR_{103}	—	December 9, 2004	Socorro	LINEAR	CYB	7.1 km	MPC · JPL
134087 Symeonplatts	2004 XU_{103}	Symeonplatts	December 9, 2004	Catalina	CSS	·	2.4 km	MPC · JPL
134088 Brettperkins	2004 XF_{104}	Brettperkins	December 9, 2004	Catalina	CSS	·	5.2 km	MPC · JPL
134089	2004 XE_{105}	—	December 10, 2004	Kitt Peak	Spacewatch	·	2.4 km	MPC · JPL
134090	2004 XS_{105}	—	December 11, 2004	Socorro	LINEAR	V	1.2 km	MPC · JPL
134091 Jaysoncowley	2004 XU_{110}	Jaysoncowley	December 14, 2004	Catalina	CSS	HYG	4.4 km	MPC · JPL
134092 Lindaleematthias	2004 XD_{111}	Lindaleematthias	December 14, 2004	Catalina	CSS	EUP	5.2 km	MPC · JPL
134093	2004 XP_{111}	—	December 14, 2004	Kitt Peak	Spacewatch	·	3.1 km	MPC · JPL
134094	2004 XR_{119}	—	December 12, 2004	Kitt Peak	Spacewatch	KOR	2.1 km	MPC · JPL
134095	2004 XS_{119}	—	December 12, 2004	Kitt Peak	Spacewatch	AGN	2.3 km	MPC · JPL
134096	2004 XA_{122}	—	December 15, 2004	Socorro	LINEAR	·	2.6 km	MPC · JPL
134097	2004 XC_{123}	—	December 10, 2004	Socorro	LINEAR	·	2.3 km	MPC · JPL
134098	2004 XN_{124}	—	December 10, 2004	Socorro	LINEAR	·	3.0 km	MPC · JPL
134099 Rexengelhardt	2004 XC_{125}	Rexengelhardt	December 11, 2004	Catalina	CSS	·	5.1 km	MPC · JPL
134100	2004 XH_{131}	—	December 10, 2004	Socorro	LINEAR	·	3.8 km	MPC · JPL

== 134101–134200 ==
back to top

Designation			Discovery			Properties		Ref
Permanent	Provisional	Named after	Date	Site	Discoverer(s)	Category	Diam.	Ref
134101	2004 XQ_{133}	—	December 15, 2004	Socorro	LINEAR	·	4.6 km	MPC · JPL
134102	2004 XM_{134}	—	December 15, 2004	Socorro	LINEAR	·	2.3 km	MPC · JPL
134103	2004 XS_{136}	—	December 15, 2004	Socorro	LINEAR	·	5.0 km	MPC · JPL
134104	2004 XZ_{144}	—	December 13, 2004	Kitt Peak	Spacewatch	AGN	2.4 km	MPC · JPL
134105 Josephfust	2004 XY_{145}	Josephfust	December 14, 2004	Catalina	CSS	THM	3.8 km	MPC · JPL
134106	2004 XP_{147}	—	December 13, 2004	Campo Imperatore	CINEOS	·	1.7 km	MPC · JPL
134107	2004 XM_{157}	—	December 14, 2004	Socorro	LINEAR	·	3.0 km	MPC · JPL
134108	2004 XP_{158}	—	December 14, 2004	Kitt Peak	Spacewatch	·	5.1 km	MPC · JPL
134109 Britneyburch	2004 XN_{159}	Britneyburch	December 14, 2004	Catalina	CSS	·	6.5 km	MPC · JPL
134110	2004 XD_{162}	—	December 15, 2004	Socorro	LINEAR	·	2.4 km	MPC · JPL
134111	2004 XP_{162}	—	December 15, 2004	Socorro	LINEAR	EOS	3.5 km	MPC · JPL
134112 Jeremyralph	2004 XZ_{169}	Jeremyralph	December 9, 2004	Catalina	CSS	·	5.6 km	MPC · JPL
134113	2004 XF_{178}	—	December 12, 2004	Kitt Peak	Spacewatch	·	2.3 km	MPC · JPL
134114	2004 XQ_{181}	—	December 15, 2004	Socorro	LINEAR	·	2.3 km	MPC · JPL
134115	2004 XA_{182}	—	December 15, 2004	Kitt Peak	Spacewatch	·	4.1 km	MPC · JPL
134116	2004 YY_{3}	—	December 16, 2004	Kitt Peak	Spacewatch	·	3.8 km	MPC · JPL
134117	2004 YS_{5}	—	December 19, 2004	Socorro	LINEAR	·	7.4 km	MPC · JPL
134118	2004 YL_{11}	—	December 18, 2004	Mount Lemmon	Mount Lemmon Survey	EMA	5.4 km	MPC · JPL
134119	2004 YY_{13}	—	December 18, 2004	Mount Lemmon	Mount Lemmon Survey	·	4.8 km	MPC · JPL
134120	2004 YG_{19}	—	December 18, 2004	Mount Lemmon	Mount Lemmon Survey	·	3.9 km	MPC · JPL
134121	2004 YE_{30}	—	December 16, 2004	Kitt Peak	Spacewatch	·	2.0 km	MPC · JPL
134122	2004 YY_{31}	—	December 20, 2004	Mount Lemmon	Mount Lemmon Survey	THM	3.7 km	MPC · JPL
134123	2004 YA_{32}	—	December 20, 2004	Mount Lemmon	Mount Lemmon Survey	·	7.4 km	MPC · JPL
134124 Subirachs	2005 AM	Subirachs	January 2, 2005	Begues	Manteca, J.	·	3.8 km	MPC · JPL
134125 Shaundaly	2005 AH_{6}	Shaundaly	January 6, 2005	Catalina	CSS	·	4.9 km	MPC · JPL
134126	2005 AN_{6}	—	January 6, 2005	Socorro	LINEAR	·	2.3 km	MPC · JPL
134127 Basher	2005 AK_{7}	Basher	January 6, 2005	Catalina	CSS	·	4.9 km	MPC · JPL
134128	2005 AF_{8}	—	January 6, 2005	Socorro	LINEAR	·	6.8 km	MPC · JPL
134129	2005 AB_{9}	—	January 7, 2005	Socorro	LINEAR	·	2.8 km	MPC · JPL
134130 Apáczai	2005 AP_{11}	Apáczai	January 3, 2005	Piszkéstető	K. Sárneczky	·	5.1 km	MPC · JPL
134131 Skipowens	2005 AT_{11}	Skipowens	January 6, 2005	Catalina	CSS	·	3.9 km	MPC · JPL
134132	2005 AQ_{12}	—	January 6, 2005	Socorro	LINEAR	·	1.2 km	MPC · JPL
134133	2005 AP_{13}	—	January 7, 2005	Socorro	LINEAR	HYG	4.4 km	MPC · JPL
134134 Kristoferdrozd	2005 AU_{21}	Kristoferdrozd	January 6, 2005	Catalina	CSS	·	5.2 km	MPC · JPL
134135 Steigerwald	2005 AY_{24}	Steigerwald	January 7, 2005	Catalina	CSS	·	3.2 km	MPC · JPL
134136	2005 AR_{29}	—	January 8, 2005	Campo Imperatore	CINEOS	·	4.8 km	MPC · JPL
134137	2005 AV_{29}	—	January 8, 2005	Campo Imperatore	CINEOS	·	2.5 km	MPC · JPL
134138 Laurabayley	2005 AG_{30}	Laurabayley	January 9, 2005	Catalina	CSS	·	5.2 km	MPC · JPL
134139	2005 AK_{31}	—	January 11, 2005	Socorro	LINEAR	MAR	1.6 km	MPC · JPL
134140	2005 AT_{32}	—	January 11, 2005	Socorro	LINEAR	·	7.4 km	MPC · JPL
134141	2005 AL_{35}	—	January 13, 2005	Socorro	LINEAR	·	3.8 km	MPC · JPL
134142	2005 AX_{38}	—	January 13, 2005	Kitt Peak	Spacewatch	·	3.5 km	MPC · JPL
134143	2005 AR_{43}	—	January 15, 2005	Socorro	LINEAR	·	4.3 km	MPC · JPL
134144	2005 AV_{46}	—	January 11, 2005	Socorro	LINEAR	·	4.1 km	MPC · JPL
134145	2005 AN_{48}	—	January 13, 2005	Kitt Peak	Spacewatch	·	1.9 km	MPC · JPL
134146 Pronoybiswas	2005 AL_{51}	Pronoybiswas	January 13, 2005	Catalina	CSS	·	4.9 km	MPC · JPL
134147	2005 AZ_{53}	—	January 13, 2005	Kitt Peak	Spacewatch	·	3.2 km	MPC · JPL
134148	2005 AC_{56}	—	January 15, 2005	Kitt Peak	Spacewatch	KOR	2.2 km	MPC · JPL
134149	2005 AJ_{56}	—	January 15, 2005	Socorro	LINEAR	THM	3.1 km	MPC · JPL
134150 Bralower	2005 AU_{57}	Bralower	January 15, 2005	Catalina	CSS	MAR	2.7 km	MPC · JPL
134151	2005 AL_{58}	—	January 15, 2005	Socorro	LINEAR	·	5.5 km	MPC · JPL
134152	2005 AF_{60}	—	January 15, 2005	Kitt Peak	Spacewatch	KOR	2.0 km	MPC · JPL
134153	2005 AF_{61}	—	January 15, 2005	Kitt Peak	Spacewatch	·	4.1 km	MPC · JPL
134154	2005 AD_{66}	—	January 13, 2005	Kitt Peak	Spacewatch	·	2.5 km	MPC · JPL
134155	2005 AJ_{71}	—	January 15, 2005	Kitt Peak	Spacewatch	KOR	2.0 km	MPC · JPL
134156	2005 AL_{71}	—	January 15, 2005	Kitt Peak	Spacewatch	KOR	1.8 km	MPC · JPL
134157	2005 AM_{71}	—	January 15, 2005	Kitt Peak	Spacewatch	·	6.8 km	MPC · JPL
134158	2005 AJ_{75}	—	January 15, 2005	Kitt Peak	Spacewatch	·	2.7 km	MPC · JPL
134159	2005 BP	—	January 16, 2005	Desert Eagle	W. K. Y. Yeung	·	2.8 km	MPC · JPL
134160 Pluis	2005 BE_{3}	Pluis	January 16, 2005	Uccle	P. De Cat	·	4.4 km	MPC · JPL
134161	2005 BN_{3}	—	January 16, 2005	Kitt Peak	Spacewatch	·	1.8 km	MPC · JPL
134162	2005 BN_{5}	—	January 16, 2005	Socorro	LINEAR	(1298)	4.1 km	MPC · JPL
134163	2005 BO_{6}	—	January 16, 2005	Socorro	LINEAR	AGN	1.9 km	MPC · JPL
134164	2005 BK_{10}	—	January 16, 2005	Socorro	LINEAR	·	7.3 km	MPC · JPL
134165	2005 BJ_{18}	—	January 16, 2005	Socorro	LINEAR	EUN	2.2 km	MPC · JPL
134166	2005 BL_{19}	—	January 16, 2005	Socorro	LINEAR	EOS	3.1 km	MPC · JPL
134167	2005 BX_{20}	—	January 16, 2005	Kitt Peak	Spacewatch	·	1.2 km	MPC · JPL
134168	2005 BG_{23}	—	January 16, 2005	Kitt Peak	Spacewatch	·	3.4 km	MPC · JPL
134169 Davidcarte	2005 BO_{24}	Davidcarte	January 17, 2005	Catalina	CSS	·	2.2 km	MPC · JPL
134170	2005 BS_{24}	—	January 17, 2005	Socorro	LINEAR	·	3.4 km	MPC · JPL
134171	2005 BM_{25}	—	January 18, 2005	Kitt Peak	Spacewatch	·	2.7 km	MPC · JPL
134172	2005 BW_{26}	—	January 19, 2005	Kitt Peak	Spacewatch	HYG	6.5 km	MPC · JPL
134173	2005 CL_{5}	—	February 1, 2005	Kitt Peak	Spacewatch	·	3.1 km	MPC · JPL
134174 Jameschen	2005 CU_{9}	Jameschen	February 1, 2005	Catalina	CSS	·	3.4 km	MPC · JPL
134175	2005 CF_{12}	—	February 1, 2005	Kitt Peak	Spacewatch	EOS	3.6 km	MPC · JPL
134176	2005 CF_{16}	—	February 2, 2005	Socorro	LINEAR	·	2.8 km	MPC · JPL
134177	2005 CN_{16}	—	February 2, 2005	Socorro	LINEAR	THM	4.9 km	MPC · JPL
134178 Markchodas	2005 CR_{18}	Markchodas	February 2, 2005	Catalina	CSS	THM	3.1 km	MPC · JPL
134179	2005 CW_{21}	—	February 3, 2005	Socorro	LINEAR	·	2.7 km	MPC · JPL
134180 Nirajinamdar	2005 CN_{22}	Nirajinamdar	February 1, 2005	Catalina	CSS	PHO	1.8 km	MPC · JPL
134181	2005 CG_{26}	—	February 1, 2005	Catalina	CSS	·	4.9 km	MPC · JPL
134182	2005 CS_{29}	—	February 1, 2005	Catalina	CSS	KOR	1.9 km	MPC · JPL
134183	2005 CL_{33}	—	February 2, 2005	Kitt Peak	Spacewatch	KOR	2.3 km	MPC · JPL
134184	2005 CV_{39}	—	February 4, 2005	Kitt Peak	Spacewatch	·	2.9 km	MPC · JPL
134185	2005 CV_{43}	—	February 2, 2005	Catalina	CSS	·	3.0 km	MPC · JPL
134186	2005 CU_{49}	—	February 2, 2005	Catalina	CSS	HYG	4.6 km	MPC · JPL
134187	2005 CR_{50}	—	February 2, 2005	Socorro	LINEAR	(21885)	6.2 km	MPC · JPL
134188	2005 CV_{52}	—	February 3, 2005	Socorro	LINEAR	·	5.0 km	MPC · JPL
134189	2005 CM_{57}	—	February 2, 2005	Socorro	LINEAR	·	3.7 km	MPC · JPL
134190	2005 CP_{57}	—	February 2, 2005	Socorro	LINEAR	·	2.5 km	MPC · JPL
134191	2005 CA_{59}	—	February 2, 2005	Catalina	CSS	·	3.5 km	MPC · JPL
134192	2005 CD_{63}	—	February 9, 2005	Kitt Peak	Spacewatch	KOR	2.5 km	MPC · JPL
134193	2005 CB_{68}	—	February 2, 2005	Socorro	LINEAR	HIL · 3:2	8.8 km	MPC · JPL
134194	2005 CL_{70}	—	February 8, 2005	Mauna Kea	Veillet, C.	KOR	2.2 km	MPC · JPL
134195	2005 CX_{76}	—	February 9, 2005	Mount Lemmon	Mount Lemmon Survey	·	2.7 km	MPC · JPL
134196	2005 DW	—	February 28, 2005	Socorro	LINEAR	·	8.6 km	MPC · JPL
134197	2005 EP	—	March 1, 2005	Socorro	LINEAR	·	5.8 km	MPC · JPL
134198	2005 EL_{6}	—	March 1, 2005	Kitt Peak	Spacewatch	·	4.4 km	MPC · JPL
134199	2005 EP_{12}	—	March 2, 2005	Catalina	CSS	·	6.3 km	MPC · JPL
134200	2005 EQ_{22}	—	March 3, 2005	Catalina	CSS	DOR	6.0 km	MPC · JPL

== 134201–134300 ==
back to top

Designation			Discovery			Properties		Ref
Permanent	Provisional	Named after	Date	Site	Discoverer(s)	Category	Diam.	Ref
134201	2005 EJ_{72}	—	March 2, 2005	Catalina	CSS	VER	7.2 km	MPC · JPL
134202	2005 EO_{84}	—	March 4, 2005	Socorro	LINEAR	V	1.0 km	MPC · JPL
134203	2005 EK_{86}	—	March 4, 2005	Socorro	LINEAR	·	3.5 km	MPC · JPL
134204	2005 EJ_{113}	—	March 4, 2005	Socorro	LINEAR	·	1.8 km	MPC · JPL
134205	2005 ET_{198}	—	March 11, 2005	Mount Lemmon	Mount Lemmon Survey	·	2.9 km	MPC · JPL
134206	2005 ER_{214}	—	March 8, 2005	Socorro	LINEAR	·	3.9 km	MPC · JPL
134207	2005 EO_{218}	—	March 10, 2005	Catalina	CSS	·	3.6 km	MPC · JPL
134208	2005 EY_{293}	—	March 11, 2005	Catalina	CSS	EOS	4.0 km	MPC · JPL
134209	2005 JC_{63}	—	May 9, 2005	Mount Lemmon	Mount Lemmon Survey	·	4.3 km	MPC · JPL
134210	2005 PQ_{21}	—	August 9, 2005	Cerro Tololo	Cerro Tololo	SDO	127 km	MPC · JPL
134211	2005 QO_{98}	—	August 27, 2005	Palomar	NEAT	·	3.0 km	MPC · JPL
134212	2005 SN_{144}	—	September 25, 2005	Palomar	NEAT	·	1.3 km	MPC · JPL
134213	2005 SK_{191}	—	September 29, 2005	Palomar	NEAT	·	6.1 km	MPC · JPL
134214	2005 TU_{61}	—	October 3, 2005	Kitt Peak	Spacewatch	·	3.5 km	MPC · JPL
134215	2005 TD_{164}	—	October 9, 2005	Kitt Peak	Spacewatch	·	5.6 km	MPC · JPL
134216	2005 UO_{160}	—	October 22, 2005	Catalina	CSS	·	1.7 km	MPC · JPL
134217	2005 UZ_{336}	—	October 30, 2005	Kitt Peak	Spacewatch	·	7.1 km	MPC · JPL
134218	2005 UE_{439}	—	October 28, 2005	Mount Lemmon	Mount Lemmon Survey	·	3.2 km	MPC · JPL
134219	2005 VJ_{120}	—	November 5, 2005	Anderson Mesa	LONEOS	THB	6.7 km	MPC · JPL
134220	2005 WM_{46}	—	November 24, 2005	Palomar	NEAT	·	4.3 km	MPC · JPL
134221	2005 WB_{147}	—	November 25, 2005	Catalina	CSS	·	2.4 km	MPC · JPL
134222	2005 WN_{188}	—	November 30, 2005	Kitt Peak	Spacewatch	GEF	2.6 km	MPC · JPL
134223	2005 WX_{193}	—	November 28, 2005	Catalina	CSS	·	1.9 km	MPC · JPL
134224	2005 XY_{57}	—	December 1, 2005	Kitt Peak	Spacewatch	·	4.0 km	MPC · JPL
134225	2005 XS_{61}	—	December 4, 2005	Kitt Peak	Spacewatch	·	3.4 km	MPC · JPL
134226	2005 XJ_{64}	—	December 6, 2005	Kitt Peak	Spacewatch	·	4.5 km	MPC · JPL
134227	2005 XT_{80}	—	December 14, 2005	Anderson Mesa	LONEOS	H	1.2 km	MPC · JPL
134228	2005 XU_{83}	—	December 6, 2005	Anderson Mesa	LONEOS	·	2.9 km	MPC · JPL
134229	2005 YK_{30}	—	December 21, 2005	Kitt Peak	Spacewatch	·	3.1 km	MPC · JPL
134230	2005 YB_{43}	—	December 24, 2005	Kitt Peak	Spacewatch	·	4.4 km	MPC · JPL
134231	2005 YC_{45}	—	December 25, 2005	Kitt Peak	Spacewatch	·	4.9 km	MPC · JPL
134232	2005 YN_{46}	—	December 25, 2005	Kitt Peak	Spacewatch	·	1.6 km	MPC · JPL
134233	2005 YD_{54}	—	December 24, 2005	Kitt Peak	Spacewatch	3:2	7.4 km	MPC · JPL
134234	2005 YF_{57}	—	December 24, 2005	Kitt Peak	Spacewatch	·	2.0 km	MPC · JPL
134235	2005 YL_{70}	—	December 26, 2005	Kitt Peak	Spacewatch	·	6.0 km	MPC · JPL
134236	2005 YO_{89}	—	December 26, 2005	Mount Lemmon	Mount Lemmon Survey	HOF	5.1 km	MPC · JPL
134237	2005 YS_{114}	—	December 25, 2005	Kitt Peak	Spacewatch	KOR	2.0 km	MPC · JPL
134238	2005 YX_{126}	—	December 27, 2005	Catalina	CSS	·	1.5 km	MPC · JPL
134239	2005 YY_{144}	—	December 28, 2005	Mount Lemmon	Mount Lemmon Survey	·	4.6 km	MPC · JPL
134240	2005 YQ_{170}	—	December 27, 2005	Catalina	CSS	(2076)	1.8 km	MPC · JPL
134241	2005 YR_{219}	—	December 30, 2005	Catalina	CSS	H	970 m	MPC · JPL
134242	2005 YS_{270}	—	December 27, 2005	Mount Lemmon	Mount Lemmon Survey	·	970 m	MPC · JPL
134243	2005 YN_{275}	—	December 30, 2005	Mount Lemmon	Mount Lemmon Survey	·	3.6 km	MPC · JPL
134244 De Young	2006 AA_{4}	De Young	January 6, 2006	Calvin-Rehoboth	L. A. Molnar	·	3.0 km	MPC · JPL
134245	2006 AG_{11}	—	January 4, 2006	Catalina	CSS	·	5.5 km	MPC · JPL
134246	2006 AR_{14}	—	January 5, 2006	Mount Lemmon	Mount Lemmon Survey	·	1.6 km	MPC · JPL
134247	2006 AM_{18}	—	January 5, 2006	Mount Lemmon	Mount Lemmon Survey	·	4.2 km	MPC · JPL
134248	2006 AL_{19}	—	January 2, 2006	Catalina	CSS	EUN	1.9 km	MPC · JPL
134249	2006 AV_{21}	—	January 5, 2006	Catalina	CSS	·	1.1 km	MPC · JPL
134250	2006 AU_{32}	—	January 5, 2006	Catalina	CSS	PHO	1.1 km	MPC · JPL
134251	2006 AN_{34}	—	January 6, 2006	Mount Lemmon	Mount Lemmon Survey	L5	18 km	MPC · JPL
134252	2006 AK_{41}	—	January 3, 2006	Socorro	LINEAR	·	1.5 km	MPC · JPL
134253	2006 AQ_{71}	—	January 6, 2006	Mount Lemmon	Mount Lemmon Survey	·	1.8 km	MPC · JPL
134254	2006 AF_{81}	—	January 4, 2006	Socorro	LINEAR	·	9.5 km	MPC · JPL
134255	2006 AV_{84}	—	January 6, 2006	Anderson Mesa	LONEOS	·	2.8 km	MPC · JPL
134256	2006 AE_{91}	—	January 6, 2006	Mount Lemmon	Mount Lemmon Survey	·	9.9 km	MPC · JPL
134257	2006 AY_{93}	—	January 7, 2006	Mount Lemmon	Mount Lemmon Survey	·	2.2 km	MPC · JPL
134258	2006 AS_{97}	—	January 7, 2006	Anderson Mesa	LONEOS	·	3.8 km	MPC · JPL
134259	2006 BG_{6}	—	January 20, 2006	Catalina	CSS	·	3.1 km	MPC · JPL
134260	2006 BG_{12}	—	January 21, 2006	Palomar	NEAT	·	3.3 km	MPC · JPL
134261	2006 BA_{21}	—	January 22, 2006	Mount Lemmon	Mount Lemmon Survey	·	1.8 km	MPC · JPL
134262	2006 BX_{23}	—	January 23, 2006	Catalina	CSS	·	3.5 km	MPC · JPL
134263	2006 BB_{29}	—	January 23, 2006	Socorro	LINEAR	CYB	7.8 km	MPC · JPL
134264	2006 BO_{30}	—	January 20, 2006	Kitt Peak	Spacewatch	·	4.7 km	MPC · JPL
134265	2006 BM_{59}	—	January 24, 2006	Socorro	LINEAR	EOS	3.3 km	MPC · JPL
134266	2006 BQ_{92}	—	January 26, 2006	Mount Lemmon	Mount Lemmon Survey	·	3.3 km	MPC · JPL
134267	2006 BQ_{98}	—	January 26, 2006	Catalina	CSS	T_{j} (2.96)	5.9 km	MPC · JPL
134268	2006 BJ_{111}	—	January 25, 2006	Kitt Peak	Spacewatch	GEF	2.1 km	MPC · JPL
134269	2006 BP_{114}	—	January 26, 2006	Kitt Peak	Spacewatch	L5	16 km	MPC · JPL
134270	2006 BG_{125}	—	January 26, 2006	Kitt Peak	Spacewatch	·	2.8 km	MPC · JPL
134271	2006 BO_{139}	—	January 28, 2006	Mount Lemmon	Mount Lemmon Survey	·	5.0 km	MPC · JPL
134272	2006 BW_{145}	—	January 28, 2006	7300 Observatory	W. K. Y. Yeung	·	3.4 km	MPC · JPL
134273	2006 BR_{156}	—	January 25, 2006	Kitt Peak	Spacewatch	·	1.6 km	MPC · JPL
134274	2006 BV_{159}	—	January 26, 2006	Kitt Peak	Spacewatch	LEO	2.7 km	MPC · JPL
134275	2006 BW_{161}	—	January 26, 2006	Anderson Mesa	LONEOS	·	2.1 km	MPC · JPL
134276	2006 BE_{247}	—	January 31, 2006	Kitt Peak	Spacewatch	·	3.9 km	MPC · JPL
134277	2006 BJ_{252}	—	January 31, 2006	Kitt Peak	Spacewatch	·	4.0 km	MPC · JPL
134278	2006 BS_{256}	—	January 31, 2006	Kitt Peak	Spacewatch	·	2.9 km	MPC · JPL
134279	2006 BT_{264}	—	January 31, 2006	Kitt Peak	Spacewatch	·	1.1 km	MPC · JPL
134280	2006 BR_{269}	—	January 28, 2006	Anderson Mesa	LONEOS	·	5.4 km	MPC · JPL
134281	2006 CM_{8}	—	February 1, 2006	Mount Lemmon	Mount Lemmon Survey	VER	4.2 km	MPC · JPL
134282	2006 CU_{20}	—	February 1, 2006	Catalina	CSS	·	7.2 km	MPC · JPL
134283	2006 CV_{40}	—	February 2, 2006	Mount Lemmon	Mount Lemmon Survey	·	2.1 km	MPC · JPL
134284	2006 CC_{42}	—	February 2, 2006	Kitt Peak	Spacewatch	·	6.4 km	MPC · JPL
134285	2006 CU_{43}	—	February 2, 2006	Mount Lemmon	Mount Lemmon Survey	·	1.2 km	MPC · JPL
134286	2006 CX_{48}	—	February 3, 2006	Kitt Peak	Spacewatch	NAE	5.3 km	MPC · JPL
134287	2006 CG_{60}	—	February 1, 2006	Catalina	CSS	·	7.7 km	MPC · JPL
134288	2006 CL_{62}	—	February 10, 2006	Catalina	CSS	·	2.5 km	MPC · JPL
134289	2006 CN_{62}	—	February 12, 2006	Palomar	NEAT	·	2.1 km	MPC · JPL
134290	2006 DX_{2}	—	February 20, 2006	Catalina	CSS	·	1.8 km	MPC · JPL
134291	2006 DZ_{6}	—	February 20, 2006	Catalina	CSS	fast	5.2 km	MPC · JPL
134292 Edwardhall	2006 DF_{8}	Edwardhall	February 20, 2006	Mount Lemmon	Mount Lemmon Survey	·	1.4 km	MPC · JPL
134293	2006 DX_{37}	—	February 20, 2006	Mount Lemmon	Mount Lemmon Survey	·	6.5 km	MPC · JPL
134294	2006 DE_{40}	—	February 22, 2006	Palomar	NEAT	·	5.0 km	MPC · JPL
134295	2006 DB_{41}	—	February 22, 2006	Catalina	CSS	·	5.1 km	MPC · JPL
134296	2006 DP_{46}	—	February 20, 2006	Catalina	CSS	·	2.0 km	MPC · JPL
134297	2006 DE_{59}	—	February 24, 2006	Mount Lemmon	Mount Lemmon Survey	·	1.5 km	MPC · JPL
134298	2006 DX_{68}	—	February 26, 2006	Catalina	CSS	·	3.8 km	MPC · JPL
134299	2006 DW_{73}	—	February 23, 2006	Kitt Peak	Spacewatch	·	1.2 km	MPC · JPL
134300	2109 P-L	—	September 24, 1960	Palomar	C. J. van Houten, I. van Houten-Groeneveld, T. Gehrels	·	2.5 km	MPC · JPL

== 134301–134400 ==
back to top

Designation			Discovery			Properties		Ref
Permanent	Provisional	Named after	Date	Site	Discoverer(s)	Category	Diam.	Ref
134301	2141 P-L	—	September 24, 1960	Palomar	C. J. van Houten, I. van Houten-Groeneveld, T. Gehrels	·	2.1 km	MPC · JPL
134302	2634 P-L	—	September 24, 1960	Palomar	C. J. van Houten, I. van Houten-Groeneveld, T. Gehrels	·	2.9 km	MPC · JPL
134303	2701 P-L	—	September 24, 1960	Palomar	C. J. van Houten, I. van Houten-Groeneveld, T. Gehrels	·	3.9 km	MPC · JPL
134304	2716 P-L	—	September 24, 1960	Palomar	C. J. van Houten, I. van Houten-Groeneveld, T. Gehrels	NYS	1.8 km	MPC · JPL
134305	2738 P-L	—	September 24, 1960	Palomar	C. J. van Houten, I. van Houten-Groeneveld, T. Gehrels	·	5.9 km	MPC · JPL
134306	2807 P-L	—	September 24, 1960	Palomar	C. J. van Houten, I. van Houten-Groeneveld, T. Gehrels	·	4.5 km	MPC · JPL
134307	2849 P-L	—	September 24, 1960	Palomar	C. J. van Houten, I. van Houten-Groeneveld, T. Gehrels	·	1.1 km	MPC · JPL
134308	4183 P-L	—	September 24, 1960	Palomar	C. J. van Houten, I. van Houten-Groeneveld, T. Gehrels	(5)	1.8 km	MPC · JPL
134309	4552 P-L	—	September 24, 1960	Palomar	C. J. van Houten, I. van Houten-Groeneveld, T. Gehrels	EUN	1.8 km	MPC · JPL
134310	4698 P-L	—	September 24, 1960	Palomar	C. J. van Houten, I. van Houten-Groeneveld, T. Gehrels	ADE	3.2 km	MPC · JPL
134311	4704 P-L	—	September 24, 1960	Palomar	C. J. van Houten, I. van Houten-Groeneveld, T. Gehrels	·	2.5 km	MPC · JPL
134312	4797 P-L	—	September 24, 1960	Palomar	C. J. van Houten, I. van Houten-Groeneveld, T. Gehrels	GEF	2.4 km	MPC · JPL
134313	4816 P-L	—	September 24, 1960	Palomar	C. J. van Houten, I. van Houten-Groeneveld, T. Gehrels	·	1.1 km	MPC · JPL
134314	6362 P-L	—	September 24, 1960	Palomar	C. J. van Houten, I. van Houten-Groeneveld, T. Gehrels	·	1.2 km	MPC · JPL
134315	7501 P-L	—	October 17, 1960	Palomar	C. J. van Houten, I. van Houten-Groeneveld, T. Gehrels	PHO	4.5 km	MPC · JPL
134316	9579 P-L	—	October 17, 1960	Palomar	C. J. van Houten, I. van Houten-Groeneveld, T. Gehrels	·	2.2 km	MPC · JPL
134317	4117 T-1	—	March 26, 1971	Palomar	C. J. van Houten, I. van Houten-Groeneveld, T. Gehrels	·	1.7 km	MPC · JPL
134318	1141 T-2	—	September 29, 1973	Palomar	C. J. van Houten, I. van Houten-Groeneveld, T. Gehrels	·	1.8 km	MPC · JPL
134319	1205 T-2	—	September 29, 1973	Palomar	C. J. van Houten, I. van Houten-Groeneveld, T. Gehrels	·	1.5 km	MPC · JPL
134320	1292 T-2	—	September 29, 1973	Palomar	C. J. van Houten, I. van Houten-Groeneveld, T. Gehrels	·	950 m	MPC · JPL
134321	1316 T-2	—	September 29, 1973	Palomar	C. J. van Houten, I. van Houten-Groeneveld, T. Gehrels	MAS	1.2 km	MPC · JPL
134322	1471 T-2	—	September 29, 1973	Palomar	C. J. van Houten, I. van Houten-Groeneveld, T. Gehrels	NYS	1.6 km	MPC · JPL
134323	1564 T-2	—	September 24, 1973	Palomar	C. J. van Houten, I. van Houten-Groeneveld, T. Gehrels	·	2.2 km	MPC · JPL
134324	1619 T-2	—	September 24, 1973	Palomar	C. J. van Houten, I. van Houten-Groeneveld, T. Gehrels	·	1.3 km	MPC · JPL
134325	4492 T-2	—	September 30, 1973	Palomar	C. J. van Houten, I. van Houten-Groeneveld, T. Gehrels	·	1.3 km	MPC · JPL
134326	2251 T-3	—	October 16, 1977	Palomar	C. J. van Houten, I. van Houten-Groeneveld, T. Gehrels	EUN	3.5 km	MPC · JPL
134327	2304 T-3	—	October 16, 1977	Palomar	C. J. van Houten, I. van Houten-Groeneveld, T. Gehrels	·	2.9 km	MPC · JPL
134328	2371 T-3	—	October 16, 1977	Palomar	C. J. van Houten, I. van Houten-Groeneveld, T. Gehrels	V	1.5 km	MPC · JPL
134329 Cycnos	2377 T-3	Cycnos	October 16, 1977	Palomar	C. J. van Houten, I. van Houten-Groeneveld, T. Gehrels	L5	18 km	MPC · JPL
134330	3055 T-3	—	October 16, 1977	Palomar	C. J. van Houten, I. van Houten-Groeneveld, T. Gehrels	·	1.6 km	MPC · JPL
134331	3139 T-3	—	October 16, 1977	Palomar	C. J. van Houten, I. van Houten-Groeneveld, T. Gehrels	KOR	2.8 km	MPC · JPL
134332	3323 T-3	—	October 16, 1977	Palomar	C. J. van Houten, I. van Houten-Groeneveld, T. Gehrels	·	1.4 km	MPC · JPL
134333	3345 T-3	—	October 16, 1977	Palomar	C. J. van Houten, I. van Houten-Groeneveld, T. Gehrels	MAS	1.3 km	MPC · JPL
134334	3391 T-3	—	October 16, 1977	Palomar	C. J. van Houten, I. van Houten-Groeneveld, T. Gehrels	NYS	1.5 km	MPC · JPL
134335	4112 T-3	—	October 16, 1977	Palomar	C. J. van Houten, I. van Houten-Groeneveld, T. Gehrels	·	2.5 km	MPC · JPL
134336	4592 T-3	—	October 16, 1977	Palomar	C. J. van Houten, I. van Houten-Groeneveld, T. Gehrels	NYS	1.7 km	MPC · JPL
134337	4680 T-3	—	October 17, 1977	Palomar	C. J. van Houten, I. van Houten-Groeneveld, T. Gehrels	·	4.8 km	MPC · JPL
134338	5080 T-3	—	October 16, 1977	Palomar	C. J. van Houten, I. van Houten-Groeneveld, T. Gehrels	(2076)	1.1 km	MPC · JPL
134339	5628 T-3	—	October 16, 1977	Palomar	C. J. van Houten, I. van Houten-Groeneveld, T. Gehrels	·	3.2 km	MPC · JPL
134340 Pluto	—	Pluto	January 23, 1930	Flagstaff	C. W. Tombaugh	plutino · moon · slow	2375 km	MPC · JPL
134341	1979 MA	—	June 25, 1979	Siding Spring	E. F. Helin, S. J. Bus	·	3.7 km	MPC · JPL
134342	1979 MV_{3}	—	June 25, 1979	Siding Spring	E. F. Helin, S. J. Bus	·	1.5 km	MPC · JPL
134343	1981 EO_{5}	—	March 2, 1981	Siding Spring	S. J. Bus	·	1.5 km	MPC · JPL
134344	1989 SG_{9}	—	September 24, 1989	La Silla	H. Debehogne	·	4.3 km	MPC · JPL
134345	1990 UN_{5}	—	October 16, 1990	La Silla	E. W. Elst	·	5.7 km	MPC · JPL
134346 Pinatubo	1991 PT_{2}	Pinatubo	August 2, 1991	La Silla	E. W. Elst	·	2.7 km	MPC · JPL
134347	1992 RV_{3}	—	September 2, 1992	La Silla	E. W. Elst	·	1.5 km	MPC · JPL
134348 Klemperer	1992 UX_{9}	Klemperer	October 31, 1992	Tautenburg Observatory	F. Börngen	·	4.5 km	MPC · JPL
134349	1993 FC_{19}	—	March 17, 1993	La Silla	UESAC	·	5.1 km	MPC · JPL
134350	1993 FH_{33}	—	March 19, 1993	La Silla	UESAC	·	1.6 km	MPC · JPL
134351	1993 RC_{8}	—	September 15, 1993	La Silla	E. W. Elst	·	3.4 km	MPC · JPL
134352	1993 TS_{7}	—	October 9, 1993	Kitt Peak	Spacewatch	·	2.4 km	MPC · JPL
134353	1993 TB_{30}	—	October 9, 1993	La Silla	E. W. Elst	·	4.2 km	MPC · JPL
134354	1993 UM_{7}	—	October 20, 1993	La Silla	E. W. Elst	·	2.9 km	MPC · JPL
134355	1994 JL_{7}	—	May 5, 1994	Kitt Peak	Spacewatch	EOS	4.2 km	MPC · JPL
134356	1994 PN_{6}	—	August 10, 1994	La Silla	E. W. Elst	·	3.3 km	MPC · JPL
134357	1994 PU_{9}	—	August 10, 1994	La Silla	E. W. Elst	·	1.8 km	MPC · JPL
134358	1994 PW_{10}	—	August 10, 1994	La Silla	E. W. Elst	·	1.8 km	MPC · JPL
134359	1994 PP_{27}	—	August 12, 1994	La Silla	E. W. Elst	·	1.6 km	MPC · JPL
134360	1994 PQ_{37}	—	August 10, 1994	La Silla	E. W. Elst	(5)	2.0 km	MPC · JPL
134361	1994 RF	—	September 4, 1994	Farra d'Isonzo	Farra d'Isonzo	·	4.9 km	MPC · JPL
134362	1994 TZ_{3}	—	October 2, 1994	Kitt Peak	Spacewatch	·	2.2 km	MPC · JPL
134363	1994 VG_{3}	—	November 7, 1994	Kushiro	S. Ueda, H. Kaneda	·	4.1 km	MPC · JPL
134364	1995 DU_{4}	—	February 21, 1995	Kitt Peak	Spacewatch	·	1.2 km	MPC · JPL
134365	1995 GG_{2}	—	April 2, 1995	Kitt Peak	Spacewatch	·	1.3 km	MPC · JPL
134366	1995 LC	—	June 1, 1995	Siding Spring	R. H. McNaught	H	1.3 km	MPC · JPL
134367	1995 OY_{7}	—	July 25, 1995	Kitt Peak	Spacewatch	·	4.9 km	MPC · JPL
134368	1995 OA_{16}	—	July 26, 1995	Kitt Peak	Spacewatch	·	4.8 km	MPC · JPL
134369 Sahara	1995 QE	Sahara	August 17, 1995	Colleverde	V. S. Casulli	·	4.2 km	MPC · JPL
134370	1995 QA_{1}	—	August 19, 1995	Xinglong	SCAP	V	1.1 km	MPC · JPL
134371	1995 RH	—	September 3, 1995	Siding Spring	R. H. McNaught	PHO	2.0 km	MPC · JPL
134372	1995 SB_{4}	—	September 25, 1995	Catalina Station	T. B. Spahr	T_{j} (2.97)	5.3 km	MPC · JPL
134373	1995 SO_{15}	—	September 18, 1995	Kitt Peak	Spacewatch	MAS	1.1 km	MPC · JPL
134374	1995 ST_{15}	—	September 18, 1995	Kitt Peak	Spacewatch	·	4.2 km	MPC · JPL
134375	1995 SP_{18}	—	September 18, 1995	Kitt Peak	Spacewatch	·	5.0 km	MPC · JPL
134376	1995 SN_{24}	—	September 19, 1995	Kitt Peak	Spacewatch	·	1.8 km	MPC · JPL
134377	1995 SF_{40}	—	September 25, 1995	Kitt Peak	Spacewatch	·	4.3 km	MPC · JPL
134378	1995 SX_{55}	—	September 22, 1995	Kitt Peak	Spacewatch	·	6.4 km	MPC · JPL
134379	1995 UZ_{40}	—	October 23, 1995	Kitt Peak	Spacewatch	·	4.9 km	MPC · JPL
134380	1995 YH_{4}	—	December 28, 1995	Siding Spring	R. H. McNaught	T_{j} (2.96)	7.0 km	MPC · JPL
134381	1996 AF_{8}	—	January 13, 1996	Kitt Peak	Spacewatch	THM	3.7 km	MPC · JPL
134382	1996 CX_{5}	—	February 10, 1996	Kitt Peak	Spacewatch	EUN	2.9 km	MPC · JPL
134383	1996 CF_{8}	—	February 10, 1996	Xinglong	SCAP	·	2.1 km	MPC · JPL
134384	1996 FU_{7}	—	March 19, 1996	Kitt Peak	Spacewatch	RAF	2.1 km	MPC · JPL
134385	1996 RW_{3}	—	September 13, 1996	Haleakala	NEAT	·	1.4 km	MPC · JPL
134386	1996 SR_{5}	—	September 20, 1996	Kitt Peak	Spacewatch	·	1.2 km	MPC · JPL
134387	1996 TB_{16}	—	October 4, 1996	Kitt Peak	Spacewatch	·	1.2 km	MPC · JPL
134388	1996 TF_{19}	—	October 4, 1996	Kitt Peak	Spacewatch	·	1.3 km	MPC · JPL
134389	1996 VP_{2}	—	November 10, 1996	Sudbury	D. di Cicco	·	7.6 km	MPC · JPL
134390	1996 VP_{15}	—	November 5, 1996	Kitt Peak	Spacewatch	V	970 m	MPC · JPL
134391	1996 XW_{10}	—	December 2, 1996	Kitt Peak	Spacewatch	·	5.5 km	MPC · JPL
134392	1996 XD_{27}	—	December 5, 1996	Kitt Peak	Spacewatch	NYS	1.4 km	MPC · JPL
134393	1997 AU_{19}	—	January 10, 1997	Kitt Peak	Spacewatch	·	5.7 km	MPC · JPL
134394	1997 BW_{3}	—	January 31, 1997	Kitt Peak	Spacewatch	V	1.2 km	MPC · JPL
134395	1997 GA_{8}	—	April 2, 1997	Socorro	LINEAR	·	3.7 km	MPC · JPL
134396	1997 HM_{9}	—	April 30, 1997	Socorro	LINEAR	·	2.1 km	MPC · JPL
134397	1997 JK_{11}	—	May 3, 1997	La Silla	E. W. Elst	·	3.6 km	MPC · JPL
134398	1997 JW_{15}	—	May 3, 1997	La Silla	E. W. Elst	·	2.9 km	MPC · JPL
134399	1997 LK_{1}	—	June 1, 1997	Kitt Peak	Spacewatch	·	3.4 km	MPC · JPL
134400	1997 LK_{17}	—	June 8, 1997	La Silla	E. W. Elst	(5)	3.4 km	MPC · JPL

== 134401–134500 ==
back to top

Designation			Discovery			Properties		Ref
Permanent	Provisional	Named after	Date	Site	Discoverer(s)	Category	Diam.	Ref
134401	1997 MB_{10}	—	June 30, 1997	Kitt Peak	Spacewatch	·	2.9 km	MPC · JPL
134402 Ieshimatoshiaki	1997 RG	Ieshimatoshiaki	September 1, 1997	Yatsuka	H. Abe	·	2.2 km	MPC · JPL
134403	1997 SC	—	September 16, 1997	Modra	A. Galád, Pravda, A.	DOR	4.6 km	MPC · JPL
134404	1997 UG_{8}	—	October 29, 1997	Goodricke-Pigott	R. A. Tucker	·	2.8 km	MPC · JPL
134405	1997 WA_{29}	—	November 29, 1997	Kitt Peak	Spacewatch	·	2.8 km	MPC · JPL
134406	1998 BF	—	January 17, 1998	Prescott	P. G. Comba	·	1.3 km	MPC · JPL
134407	1998 BV_{9}	—	January 22, 1998	Kitt Peak	Spacewatch	·	3.8 km	MPC · JPL
134408	1998 DA_{18}	—	February 23, 1998	Kitt Peak	Spacewatch	·	1.7 km	MPC · JPL
134409	1998 FV	—	March 18, 1998	Kitt Peak	Spacewatch	·	2.1 km	MPC · JPL
134410	1998 FF_{8}	—	March 20, 1998	Kitt Peak	Spacewatch	·	4.0 km	MPC · JPL
134411	1998 FH_{8}	—	March 20, 1998	Kitt Peak	Spacewatch	EOS	3.1 km	MPC · JPL
134412	1998 FR_{29}	—	March 20, 1998	Socorro	LINEAR	·	2.5 km	MPC · JPL
134413	1998 FU_{76}	—	March 24, 1998	Socorro	LINEAR	NYS ·	4.2 km	MPC · JPL
134414	1998 HA_{26}	—	April 20, 1998	Kitt Peak	Spacewatch	·	2.1 km	MPC · JPL
134415	1998 HZ_{33}	—	April 20, 1998	Socorro	LINEAR	·	3.4 km	MPC · JPL
134416	1998 HP_{37}	—	April 20, 1998	Socorro	LINEAR	·	2.1 km	MPC · JPL
134417	1998 HR_{60}	—	April 21, 1998	Socorro	LINEAR	·	2.9 km	MPC · JPL
134418	1998 HP_{130}	—	April 19, 1998	Socorro	LINEAR	·	2.4 km	MPC · JPL
134419 Hippothous	1998 MV_{47}	Hippothous	June 28, 1998	La Silla	E. W. Elst	L5	17 km	MPC · JPL
134420	1998 OA_{15}	—	July 26, 1998	La Silla	E. W. Elst	·	1.8 km	MPC · JPL
134421	1998 QT_{2}	—	August 17, 1998	Socorro	LINEAR	·	7.6 km	MPC · JPL
134422	1998 QM_{3}	—	August 17, 1998	Socorro	LINEAR	H	1.4 km	MPC · JPL
134423	1998 QT_{4}	—	August 22, 1998	Xinglong	SCAP	·	1.7 km	MPC · JPL
134424	1998 QM_{43}	—	August 17, 1998	Socorro	LINEAR	·	2.1 km	MPC · JPL
134425	1998 QJ_{68}	—	August 24, 1998	Socorro	LINEAR	EUN	2.7 km	MPC · JPL
134426	1998 QQ_{105}	—	August 25, 1998	La Silla	E. W. Elst	·	2.4 km	MPC · JPL
134427	1998 QM_{109}	—	August 17, 1998	Socorro	LINEAR	·	5.3 km	MPC · JPL
134428	1998 RZ_{3}	—	September 14, 1998	Socorro	LINEAR	·	1.9 km	MPC · JPL
134429	1998 RT_{5}	—	September 15, 1998	Anderson Mesa	LONEOS	3:2 · SHU	10 km	MPC · JPL
134430	1998 RK_{30}	—	September 14, 1998	Socorro	LINEAR	·	1.9 km	MPC · JPL
134431	1998 RU_{34}	—	September 14, 1998	Socorro	LINEAR	·	1.7 km	MPC · JPL
134432	1998 RH_{47}	—	September 14, 1998	Socorro	LINEAR	·	1.6 km	MPC · JPL
134433	1998 RG_{48}	—	September 14, 1998	Socorro	LINEAR	·	2.5 km	MPC · JPL
134434	1998 RQ_{48}	—	September 14, 1998	Socorro	LINEAR	·	1.9 km	MPC · JPL
134435	1998 RK_{58}	—	September 14, 1998	Socorro	LINEAR	(5)	1.8 km	MPC · JPL
134436	1998 RH_{61}	—	September 14, 1998	Socorro	LINEAR	·	1.9 km	MPC · JPL
134437	1998 RR_{62}	—	September 14, 1998	Socorro	LINEAR	·	1.4 km	MPC · JPL
134438	1998 RV_{72}	—	September 14, 1998	Socorro	LINEAR	·	2.1 km	MPC · JPL
134439	1998 RW_{74}	—	September 14, 1998	Socorro	LINEAR	·	2.0 km	MPC · JPL
134440	1998 SE_{33}	—	September 18, 1998	Socorro	LINEAR	H	1.1 km	MPC · JPL
134441	1998 SK_{36}	—	September 27, 1998	Ondřejov	L. Kotková	(5)	2.2 km	MPC · JPL
134442	1998 SU_{50}	—	September 26, 1998	Kitt Peak	Spacewatch	·	1.8 km	MPC · JPL
134443	1998 SN_{56}	—	September 16, 1998	Anderson Mesa	LONEOS	·	1.9 km	MPC · JPL
134444	1998 SV_{75}	—	September 29, 1998	Socorro	LINEAR	(5)	1.7 km	MPC · JPL
134445	1998 SB_{80}	—	September 26, 1998	Socorro	LINEAR	·	2.1 km	MPC · JPL
134446	1998 SE_{80}	—	September 26, 1998	Socorro	LINEAR	·	2.3 km	MPC · JPL
134447	1998 SK_{80}	—	September 26, 1998	Socorro	LINEAR	·	1.7 km	MPC · JPL
134448	1998 SX_{80}	—	September 26, 1998	Socorro	LINEAR	·	2.6 km	MPC · JPL
134449	1998 SR_{81}	—	September 26, 1998	Socorro	LINEAR	·	1.6 km	MPC · JPL
134450	1998 SC_{86}	—	September 26, 1998	Socorro	LINEAR	·	1.5 km	MPC · JPL
134451	1998 SG_{98}	—	September 26, 1998	Socorro	LINEAR	RAF	1.9 km	MPC · JPL
134452	1998 SZ_{104}	—	September 26, 1998	Socorro	LINEAR	·	2.3 km	MPC · JPL
134453	1998 SU_{108}	—	September 26, 1998	Socorro	LINEAR	(5)	2.8 km	MPC · JPL
134454	1998 SG_{109}	—	September 26, 1998	Socorro	LINEAR	·	1.6 km	MPC · JPL
134455	1998 ST_{116}	—	September 26, 1998	Socorro	LINEAR	(5)	1.9 km	MPC · JPL
134456	1998 SH_{117}	—	September 26, 1998	Socorro	LINEAR	·	3.1 km	MPC · JPL
134457	1998 SK_{131}	—	September 26, 1998	Socorro	LINEAR	·	2.2 km	MPC · JPL
134458	1998 SQ_{131}	—	September 26, 1998	Socorro	LINEAR	EUN	2.0 km	MPC · JPL
134459	1998 SS_{131}	—	September 26, 1998	Socorro	LINEAR	·	1.6 km	MPC · JPL
134460	1998 SA_{132}	—	September 26, 1998	Socorro	LINEAR	·	2.5 km	MPC · JPL
134461	1998 SN_{139}	—	September 26, 1998	Socorro	LINEAR	·	1.7 km	MPC · JPL
134462	1998 ST_{163}	—	September 18, 1998	La Silla	E. W. Elst	·	1.9 km	MPC · JPL
134463	1998 SG_{169}	—	September 22, 1998	Anderson Mesa	LONEOS	(5)	1.7 km	MPC · JPL
134464	1998 TQ_{2}	—	October 13, 1998	Caussols	ODAS	(5)	2.5 km	MPC · JPL
134465	1998 TB_{13}	—	October 13, 1998	Kitt Peak	Spacewatch	·	1.9 km	MPC · JPL
134466	1998 TD_{19}	—	October 14, 1998	Xinglong	SCAP	·	2.0 km	MPC · JPL
134467	1998 UM_{7}	—	October 22, 1998	Višnjan Observatory	K. Korlević	·	1.8 km	MPC · JPL
134468	1998 UX_{8}	—	October 17, 1998	Xinglong	SCAP	615	3.4 km	MPC · JPL
134469	1998 UD_{11}	—	October 17, 1998	Kitt Peak	Spacewatch	·	2.2 km	MPC · JPL
134470	1998 UU_{34}	—	October 28, 1998	Socorro	LINEAR	(5)	1.8 km	MPC · JPL
134471	1998 UW_{41}	—	October 28, 1998	Socorro	LINEAR	slow	3.0 km	MPC · JPL
134472	1998 UX_{41}	—	October 28, 1998	Socorro	LINEAR	(5)	2.1 km	MPC · JPL
134473	1998 VA_{14}	—	November 10, 1998	Socorro	LINEAR	·	4.0 km	MPC · JPL
134474	1998 VD_{37}	—	November 10, 1998	Socorro	LINEAR	(5)	2.0 km	MPC · JPL
134475	1998 VC_{39}	—	November 10, 1998	Socorro	LINEAR	·	2.0 km	MPC · JPL
134476	1998 VE_{49}	—	November 11, 1998	Socorro	LINEAR	·	1.7 km	MPC · JPL
134477	1998 VF_{49}	—	November 11, 1998	Socorro	LINEAR	·	1.8 km	MPC · JPL
134478	1998 VN_{51}	—	November 13, 1998	Socorro	LINEAR	·	5.4 km	MPC · JPL
134479	1998 VJ_{52}	—	November 13, 1998	Socorro	LINEAR	·	3.2 km	MPC · JPL
134480	1998 VY_{52}	—	November 14, 1998	Socorro	LINEAR	·	3.4 km	MPC · JPL
134481	1998 VJ_{54}	—	November 14, 1998	Socorro	LINEAR	·	2.5 km	MPC · JPL
134482	1998 WX_{1}	—	November 17, 1998	Socorro	LINEAR	H	930 m	MPC · JPL
134483	1998 WK_{2}	—	November 19, 1998	Cocoa	I. P. Griffin	·	1.7 km	MPC · JPL
134484	1998 WO_{15}	—	November 21, 1998	Socorro	LINEAR	EUN	2.6 km	MPC · JPL
134485	1998 WA_{21}	—	November 18, 1998	Socorro	LINEAR	(5)	1.9 km	MPC · JPL
134486	1998 XP	—	December 10, 1998	Kleť	Kleť	·	2.2 km	MPC · JPL
134487	1998 XF_{4}	—	December 8, 1998	Kitt Peak	Spacewatch	·	2.2 km	MPC · JPL
134488	1998 XJ_{22}	—	December 11, 1998	Kitt Peak	Spacewatch	·	1.8 km	MPC · JPL
134489	1998 XR_{38}	—	December 14, 1998	Socorro	LINEAR	·	3.4 km	MPC · JPL
134490	1998 XF_{40}	—	December 14, 1998	Socorro	LINEAR	·	3.2 km	MPC · JPL
134491	1998 XK_{45}	—	December 14, 1998	Socorro	LINEAR	(5)	2.7 km	MPC · JPL
134492	1998 XR_{53}	—	December 14, 1998	Socorro	LINEAR	·	4.9 km	MPC · JPL
134493	1998 XR_{63}	—	December 14, 1998	Socorro	LINEAR	ADE	6.7 km	MPC · JPL
134494	1998 XV_{67}	—	December 14, 1998	Socorro	LINEAR	·	4.1 km	MPC · JPL
134495	1998 YT_{21}	—	December 26, 1998	Kitt Peak	Spacewatch	·	4.7 km	MPC · JPL
134496	1999 AG_{17}	—	January 11, 1999	Kitt Peak	Spacewatch	GEF	3.1 km	MPC · JPL
134497	1999 BQ_{1}	—	January 16, 1999	Višnjan Observatory	K. Korlević	·	5.5 km	MPC · JPL
134498	1999 BZ_{7}	—	January 21, 1999	Višnjan Observatory	K. Korlević	DOR	4.9 km	MPC · JPL
134499	1999 BE_{9}	—	January 22, 1999	Višnjan Observatory	K. Korlević	GEF	2.7 km	MPC · JPL
134500	1999 BK_{27}	—	January 16, 1999	Kitt Peak	Spacewatch	·	4.2 km	MPC · JPL

== 134501–134600 ==
back to top

Designation			Discovery			Properties		Ref
Permanent	Provisional	Named after	Date	Site	Discoverer(s)	Category	Diam.	Ref
134501	1999 CK_{45}	—	February 10, 1999	Socorro	LINEAR	·	5.8 km	MPC · JPL
134502	1999 CW_{81}	—	February 12, 1999	Socorro	LINEAR	·	5.3 km	MPC · JPL
134503	1999 CO_{91}	—	February 10, 1999	Socorro	LINEAR	·	4.2 km	MPC · JPL
134504	1999 CL_{95}	—	February 10, 1999	Socorro	LINEAR	T_{j} (2.99) · EUP	8.5 km	MPC · JPL
134505	1999 CG_{98}	—	February 10, 1999	Socorro	LINEAR	·	3.8 km	MPC · JPL
134506	1999 CZ_{108}	—	February 12, 1999	Socorro	LINEAR	EUN	2.6 km	MPC · JPL
134507	1999 CR_{142}	—	February 10, 1999	Kitt Peak	Spacewatch	·	7.0 km	MPC · JPL
134508	1999 CA_{147}	—	February 9, 1999	Kitt Peak	Spacewatch	GEF	2.6 km	MPC · JPL
134509	1999 FC_{8}	—	March 20, 1999	Socorro	LINEAR	·	1.3 km	MPC · JPL
134510	1999 FT_{21}	—	March 24, 1999	Monte Agliale	Santangelo, M. M. M.	THM	4.2 km	MPC · JPL
134511	1999 FK_{35}	—	March 20, 1999	Socorro	LINEAR	JUN	3.5 km	MPC · JPL
134512	1999 GC_{58}	—	April 7, 1999	Socorro	LINEAR	·	1.7 km	MPC · JPL
134513	1999 JN_{42}	—	May 10, 1999	Socorro	LINEAR	THM	5.9 km	MPC · JPL
134514	1999 JK_{123}	—	May 13, 1999	Socorro	LINEAR	·	3.1 km	MPC · JPL
134515	1999 JL_{124}	—	May 10, 1999	Socorro	LINEAR	·	4.6 km	MPC · JPL
134516	1999 KM_{10}	—	May 18, 1999	Socorro	LINEAR	·	1.2 km	MPC · JPL
134517	1999 NN	—	July 7, 1999	Reedy Creek	J. Broughton	·	1.4 km	MPC · JPL
134518	1999 NA_{18}	—	July 14, 1999	Socorro	LINEAR	PHO	1.4 km	MPC · JPL
134519	1999 NB_{21}	—	July 14, 1999	Socorro	LINEAR	(2076)	1.6 km	MPC · JPL
134520	1999 PK_{3}	—	August 12, 1999	Farpoint	G. Hug	·	1.5 km	MPC · JPL
134521	1999 RU_{8}	—	September 4, 1999	Kitt Peak	Spacewatch	·	1.2 km	MPC · JPL
134522	1999 RD_{13}	—	September 7, 1999	Socorro	LINEAR	V	1.1 km	MPC · JPL
134523	1999 RR_{13}	—	September 7, 1999	Socorro	LINEAR	·	1.4 km	MPC · JPL
134524	1999 RH_{18}	—	September 7, 1999	Socorro	LINEAR	·	1.4 km	MPC · JPL
134525	1999 RW_{21}	—	September 7, 1999	Socorro	LINEAR	NYS ·	3.2 km	MPC · JPL
134526	1999 RX_{22}	—	September 7, 1999	Socorro	LINEAR	·	1.6 km	MPC · JPL
134527	1999 RY_{30}	—	September 8, 1999	Socorro	LINEAR	PHO	2.0 km	MPC · JPL
134528	1999 RQ_{38}	—	September 12, 1999	Ondřejov	P. Pravec, P. Kušnirák	·	1.7 km	MPC · JPL
134529	1999 RD_{40}	—	September 12, 1999	Catalina	CSS	·	3.7 km	MPC · JPL
134530	1999 RN_{52}	—	September 7, 1999	Socorro	LINEAR	·	1.7 km	MPC · JPL
134531	1999 RN_{54}	—	September 7, 1999	Socorro	LINEAR	·	1.9 km	MPC · JPL
134532	1999 RF_{55}	—	September 7, 1999	Socorro	LINEAR	·	1.2 km	MPC · JPL
134533	1999 RO_{64}	—	September 7, 1999	Socorro	LINEAR	·	2.1 km	MPC · JPL
134534	1999 RN_{69}	—	September 7, 1999	Socorro	LINEAR	·	1.4 km	MPC · JPL
134535	1999 RZ_{70}	—	September 7, 1999	Socorro	LINEAR	·	1.3 km	MPC · JPL
134536	1999 RD_{77}	—	September 7, 1999	Socorro	LINEAR	·	1.9 km	MPC · JPL
134537	1999 RD_{83}	—	September 7, 1999	Socorro	LINEAR	·	1.4 km	MPC · JPL
134538	1999 RQ_{84}	—	September 7, 1999	Socorro	LINEAR	·	1.4 km	MPC · JPL
134539	1999 RV_{89}	—	September 7, 1999	Socorro	LINEAR	·	2.1 km	MPC · JPL
134540	1999 RZ_{91}	—	September 7, 1999	Socorro	LINEAR	·	1.3 km	MPC · JPL
134541	1999 RD_{96}	—	September 7, 1999	Socorro	LINEAR	PHO	1.9 km	MPC · JPL
134542	1999 RZ_{101}	—	September 8, 1999	Socorro	LINEAR	V	1.3 km	MPC · JPL
134543	1999 RA_{119}	—	September 9, 1999	Socorro	LINEAR	·	1.7 km	MPC · JPL
134544	1999 RN_{124}	—	September 9, 1999	Socorro	LINEAR	V	1.1 km	MPC · JPL
134545	1999 RP_{124}	—	September 9, 1999	Socorro	LINEAR	V	1.2 km	MPC · JPL
134546	1999 RZ_{136}	—	September 9, 1999	Socorro	LINEAR	·	1.5 km	MPC · JPL
134547	1999 RL_{148}	—	September 9, 1999	Socorro	LINEAR	NYS	1.9 km	MPC · JPL
134548	1999 RY_{150}	—	September 9, 1999	Socorro	LINEAR	·	1.4 km	MPC · JPL
134549	1999 RN_{154}	—	September 9, 1999	Socorro	LINEAR	V · slow	1.5 km	MPC · JPL
134550	1999 RF_{157}	—	September 9, 1999	Socorro	LINEAR	·	1.5 km	MPC · JPL
134551	1999 RQ_{162}	—	September 9, 1999	Socorro	LINEAR	·	1.7 km	MPC · JPL
134552	1999 RD_{165}	—	September 9, 1999	Socorro	LINEAR	·	2.2 km	MPC · JPL
134553	1999 RK_{165}	—	September 9, 1999	Socorro	LINEAR	slow	1.3 km	MPC · JPL
134554	1999 RE_{169}	—	September 9, 1999	Socorro	LINEAR	·	2.0 km	MPC · JPL
134555	1999 RN_{169}	—	September 9, 1999	Socorro	LINEAR	ERI · slow	3.9 km	MPC · JPL
134556	1999 RV_{169}	—	September 9, 1999	Socorro	LINEAR	·	1.5 km	MPC · JPL
134557	1999 RH_{172}	—	September 9, 1999	Socorro	LINEAR	·	2.0 km	MPC · JPL
134558	1999 RW_{173}	—	September 9, 1999	Socorro	LINEAR	·	1.3 km	MPC · JPL
134559	1999 RB_{174}	—	September 9, 1999	Socorro	LINEAR	·	1.4 km	MPC · JPL
134560	1999 RV_{174}	—	September 9, 1999	Socorro	LINEAR	V	1.4 km	MPC · JPL
134561	1999 RM_{175}	—	September 9, 1999	Socorro	LINEAR	NYS	1.9 km	MPC · JPL
134562	1999 RS_{177}	—	September 9, 1999	Socorro	LINEAR	3:2 · SHU	9.8 km	MPC · JPL
134563	1999 RA_{179}	—	September 9, 1999	Socorro	LINEAR	V	1.1 km	MPC · JPL
134564	1999 RG_{179}	—	September 9, 1999	Socorro	LINEAR	NYS	1.3 km	MPC · JPL
134565	1999 RK_{208}	—	September 8, 1999	Socorro	LINEAR	·	1.9 km	MPC · JPL
134566	1999 RY_{208}	—	September 8, 1999	Socorro	LINEAR	V	1.3 km	MPC · JPL
134567	1999 RZ_{212}	—	September 9, 1999	Socorro	LINEAR	·	2.1 km	MPC · JPL
134568	1999 RH_{215}	—	September 7, 1999	Mauna Kea	C. A. Trujillo, D. C. Jewitt, J. X. Luu	cubewano (hot)	116 km	MPC · JPL
134569	1999 RH_{222}	—	September 7, 1999	Anderson Mesa	LONEOS	BAP	1.8 km	MPC · JPL
134570	1999 RM_{241}	—	September 14, 1999	Catalina	CSS	·	1.6 km	MPC · JPL
134571	1999 RH_{246}	—	September 7, 1999	Socorro	LINEAR	·	1.6 km	MPC · JPL
134572	1999 RV_{248}	—	September 7, 1999	Kitt Peak	Spacewatch	·	1.6 km	MPC · JPL
134573	1999 SK_{3}	—	September 22, 1999	Socorro	LINEAR	PHO	2.5 km	MPC · JPL
134574	1999 SF_{14}	—	September 29, 1999	Catalina	CSS	·	2.0 km	MPC · JPL
134575	1999 SL_{15}	—	September 30, 1999	Catalina	CSS	·	2.2 km	MPC · JPL
134576	1999 SX_{15}	—	September 30, 1999	Catalina	CSS	PHO	2.6 km	MPC · JPL
134577	1999 SY_{27}	—	September 27, 1999	Socorro	LINEAR	PHO	6.6 km	MPC · JPL
134578	1999 TN_{7}	—	October 7, 1999	Višnjan Observatory	K. Korlević, M. Jurić	·	2.6 km	MPC · JPL
134579	1999 TC_{14}	—	October 13, 1999	Prescott	P. G. Comba	NYS	1.5 km	MPC · JPL
134580	1999 TE_{19}	—	October 11, 1999	Uccle	T. Pauwels	V	1.4 km	MPC · JPL
134581	1999 TX_{28}	—	October 4, 1999	Socorro	LINEAR	·	1.8 km	MPC · JPL
134582	1999 TZ_{31}	—	October 4, 1999	Socorro	LINEAR	·	1.9 km	MPC · JPL
134583	1999 TA_{34}	—	October 4, 1999	Socorro	LINEAR	MAS	1.2 km	MPC · JPL
134584	1999 TU_{44}	—	October 3, 1999	Kitt Peak	Spacewatch	·	2.8 km	MPC · JPL
134585	1999 TN_{56}	—	October 6, 1999	Kitt Peak	Spacewatch	MAS	1.1 km	MPC · JPL
134586	1999 TA_{61}	—	October 7, 1999	Kitt Peak	Spacewatch	NYS	1.5 km	MPC · JPL
134587	1999 TZ_{62}	—	October 7, 1999	Kitt Peak	Spacewatch	·	2.9 km	MPC · JPL
134588	1999 TK_{64}	—	October 8, 1999	Kitt Peak	Spacewatch	·	1.2 km	MPC · JPL
134589	1999 TB_{94}	—	October 2, 1999	Socorro	LINEAR	NYS	1.5 km	MPC · JPL
134590	1999 TO_{96}	—	October 2, 1999	Socorro	LINEAR	V	1.3 km	MPC · JPL
134591	1999 TJ_{104}	—	October 3, 1999	Socorro	LINEAR	·	2.2 km	MPC · JPL
134592	1999 TK_{111}	—	October 4, 1999	Socorro	LINEAR	·	1.7 km	MPC · JPL
134593	1999 TR_{121}	—	October 4, 1999	Socorro	LINEAR	PHO	1.8 km	MPC · JPL
134594	1999 TZ_{121}	—	October 4, 1999	Socorro	LINEAR	·	1.4 km	MPC · JPL
134595	1999 TS_{123}	—	October 4, 1999	Socorro	LINEAR	·	1.8 km	MPC · JPL
134596	1999 TD_{125}	—	October 4, 1999	Socorro	LINEAR	V	1.1 km	MPC · JPL
134597	1999 TE_{128}	—	October 4, 1999	Socorro	LINEAR	·	1.6 km	MPC · JPL
134598	1999 TQ_{147}	—	October 7, 1999	Socorro	LINEAR	AGN	2.3 km	MPC · JPL
134599	1999 TF_{148}	—	October 7, 1999	Socorro	LINEAR	·	1.8 km	MPC · JPL
134600	1999 TO_{149}	—	October 7, 1999	Socorro	LINEAR	V	1.1 km	MPC · JPL

== 134601–134700 ==
back to top

Designation			Discovery			Properties		Ref
Permanent	Provisional	Named after	Date	Site	Discoverer(s)	Category	Diam.	Ref
134601	1999 TM_{151}	—	October 7, 1999	Socorro	LINEAR	·	2.0 km	MPC · JPL
134602	1999 TX_{151}	—	October 7, 1999	Socorro	LINEAR	V	1.4 km	MPC · JPL
134603	1999 TJ_{171}	—	October 10, 1999	Socorro	LINEAR	MAS	1.2 km	MPC · JPL
134604	1999 TN_{174}	—	October 10, 1999	Socorro	LINEAR	·	2.3 km	MPC · JPL
134605	1999 TF_{177}	—	October 10, 1999	Socorro	LINEAR	·	1.6 km	MPC · JPL
134606	1999 TH_{191}	—	October 12, 1999	Socorro	LINEAR	T_{j} (2.97) · HIL · 3:2	10 km	MPC · JPL
134607	1999 TK_{197}	—	October 12, 1999	Socorro	LINEAR	·	1.4 km	MPC · JPL
134608	1999 TS_{200}	—	October 13, 1999	Socorro	LINEAR	·	1.8 km	MPC · JPL
134609	1999 TO_{213}	—	October 15, 1999	Socorro	LINEAR	·	2.1 km	MPC · JPL
134610	1999 TE_{215}	—	October 15, 1999	Socorro	LINEAR	·	1.6 km	MPC · JPL
134611	1999 TN_{217}	—	October 15, 1999	Socorro	LINEAR	·	2.1 km	MPC · JPL
134612	1999 TO_{218}	—	October 15, 1999	Socorro	LINEAR	·	3.0 km	MPC · JPL
134613	1999 TT_{220}	—	October 1, 1999	Catalina	CSS	·	2.4 km	MPC · JPL
134614	1999 TB_{232}	—	October 5, 1999	Catalina	CSS	ERI	3.0 km	MPC · JPL
134615	1999 TC_{232}	—	October 5, 1999	Catalina	CSS	V	1.2 km	MPC · JPL
134616	1999 TP_{235}	—	October 3, 1999	Catalina	CSS	·	1.9 km	MPC · JPL
134617	1999 TZ_{242}	—	October 4, 1999	Anderson Mesa	LONEOS	·	2.4 km	MPC · JPL
134618	1999 TJ_{259}	—	October 9, 1999	Socorro	LINEAR	NYS	1.7 km	MPC · JPL
134619	1999 TA_{260}	—	October 9, 1999	Socorro	LINEAR	·	1.6 km	MPC · JPL
134620	1999 TC_{265}	—	October 3, 1999	Socorro	LINEAR	H	1.1 km	MPC · JPL
134621	1999 TC_{271}	—	October 3, 1999	Socorro	LINEAR	·	1.9 km	MPC · JPL
134622	1999 TT_{271}	—	October 3, 1999	Socorro	LINEAR	V	1.2 km	MPC · JPL
134623	1999 TM_{272}	—	October 3, 1999	Socorro	LINEAR	V	1.2 km	MPC · JPL
134624	1999 TZ_{272}	—	October 3, 1999	Socorro	LINEAR	·	1.5 km	MPC · JPL
134625	1999 TM_{273}	—	October 5, 1999	Socorro	LINEAR	·	4.6 km	MPC · JPL
134626	1999 TM_{274}	—	October 6, 1999	Socorro	LINEAR	·	1.8 km	MPC · JPL
134627	1999 TA_{281}	—	October 8, 1999	Socorro	LINEAR	PHO	1.2 km	MPC · JPL
134628	1999 TR_{283}	—	October 9, 1999	Socorro	LINEAR	NYS	1.7 km	MPC · JPL
134629	1999 TK_{286}	—	October 10, 1999	Socorro	LINEAR	·	2.5 km	MPC · JPL
134630	1999 TC_{315}	—	October 9, 1999	Catalina	CSS	·	1.6 km	MPC · JPL
134631	1999 TX_{322}	—	October 2, 1999	Anderson Mesa	LONEOS	·	1.9 km	MPC · JPL
134632	1999 UG_{7}	—	October 30, 1999	Socorro	LINEAR	PHO · slow	3.2 km	MPC · JPL
134633	1999 UG_{8}	—	October 29, 1999	Catalina	CSS	NYS	2.2 km	MPC · JPL
134634	1999 UH_{12}	—	October 31, 1999	Kitt Peak	Spacewatch	MAS	1.1 km	MPC · JPL
134635	1999 UY_{15}	—	October 29, 1999	Catalina	CSS	·	3.6 km	MPC · JPL
134636	1999 UB_{20}	—	October 31, 1999	Kitt Peak	Spacewatch	PHO	1.7 km	MPC · JPL
134637	1999 UD_{24}	—	October 28, 1999	Catalina	CSS	·	2.5 km	MPC · JPL
134638	1999 UD_{37}	—	October 16, 1999	Kitt Peak	Spacewatch	MRX	2.1 km	MPC · JPL
134639	1999 UH_{38}	—	October 17, 1999	Anderson Mesa	LONEOS	·	2.0 km	MPC · JPL
134640	1999 UV_{42}	—	October 28, 1999	Catalina	CSS	·	2.4 km	MPC · JPL
134641	1999 UA_{43}	—	October 28, 1999	Catalina	CSS	·	2.7 km	MPC · JPL
134642	1999 UV_{44}	—	October 30, 1999	Catalina	CSS	T_{j} (2.99) · 3:2 · SHU	11 km	MPC · JPL
134643	1999 UU_{47}	—	October 30, 1999	Catalina	CSS	·	3.2 km	MPC · JPL
134644	1999 VV_{4}	—	November 5, 1999	Višnjan Observatory	K. Korlević	NYS ·	4.7 km	MPC · JPL
134645	1999 VZ_{4}	—	November 5, 1999	Višnjan Observatory	K. Korlević	NYS	4.0 km	MPC · JPL
134646	1999 VN_{7}	—	November 7, 1999	Višnjan Observatory	K. Korlević	NYS	4.1 km	MPC · JPL
134647	1999 VM_{9}	—	November 8, 1999	Višnjan Observatory	K. Korlević	·	1.8 km	MPC · JPL
134648	1999 VN_{22}	—	November 13, 1999	Fountain Hills	C. W. Juels	·	2.7 km	MPC · JPL
134649	1999 VR_{28}	—	November 3, 1999	Socorro	LINEAR	·	1.1 km	MPC · JPL
134650	1999 VS_{29}	—	November 3, 1999	Socorro	LINEAR	NYS	1.4 km	MPC · JPL
134651	1999 VQ_{37}	—	November 3, 1999	Socorro	LINEAR	·	2.4 km	MPC · JPL
134652	1999 VT_{37}	—	November 3, 1999	Socorro	LINEAR	3:2	10 km	MPC · JPL
134653	1999 VJ_{38}	—	November 10, 1999	Socorro	LINEAR	·	1.8 km	MPC · JPL
134654	1999 VK_{40}	—	November 13, 1999	Uenohara	N. Kawasato	·	2.4 km	MPC · JPL
134655	1999 VR_{51}	—	November 3, 1999	Socorro	LINEAR	·	1.5 km	MPC · JPL
134656	1999 VV_{68}	—	November 4, 1999	Socorro	LINEAR	V	1.5 km	MPC · JPL
134657	1999 VG_{79}	—	November 4, 1999	Socorro	LINEAR	NYS	2.0 km	MPC · JPL
134658	1999 VS_{85}	—	November 4, 1999	Socorro	LINEAR	NYS ·	2.0 km	MPC · JPL
134659	1999 VX_{88}	—	November 4, 1999	Socorro	LINEAR	·	1.6 km	MPC · JPL
134660	1999 VR_{112}	—	November 9, 1999	Socorro	LINEAR	MAS	1.2 km	MPC · JPL
134661	1999 VT_{112}	—	November 9, 1999	Socorro	LINEAR	MAS	1.1 km	MPC · JPL
134662	1999 VQ_{128}	—	November 9, 1999	Kitt Peak	Spacewatch	MAS	1.1 km	MPC · JPL
134663	1999 VM_{135}	—	November 13, 1999	Anderson Mesa	LONEOS	·	2.7 km	MPC · JPL
134664	1999 VE_{144}	—	November 11, 1999	Catalina	CSS	·	2.1 km	MPC · JPL
134665	1999 VR_{148}	—	November 14, 1999	Socorro	LINEAR	·	2.9 km	MPC · JPL
134666	1999 VM_{156}	—	November 12, 1999	Socorro	LINEAR	·	1.3 km	MPC · JPL
134667	1999 VQ_{164}	—	November 14, 1999	Socorro	LINEAR	·	3.0 km	MPC · JPL
134668	1999 VX_{169}	—	November 14, 1999	Socorro	LINEAR	NYS	2.1 km	MPC · JPL
134669	1999 VC_{186}	—	November 15, 1999	Socorro	LINEAR	MAS	1.4 km	MPC · JPL
134670	1999 VF_{189}	—	November 15, 1999	Socorro	LINEAR	NYS	1.5 km	MPC · JPL
134671	1999 VF_{193}	—	November 1, 1999	Catalina	CSS	V	1.2 km	MPC · JPL
134672	1999 VE_{205}	—	November 11, 1999	Catalina	CSS	ERI	3.9 km	MPC · JPL
134673	1999 VM_{211}	—	November 14, 1999	Uccle	E. W. Elst	NYS	1.9 km	MPC · JPL
134674	1999 VO_{225}	—	November 5, 1999	Socorro	LINEAR	·	2.1 km	MPC · JPL
134675	1999 WR_{6}	—	November 28, 1999	Višnjan Observatory	K. Korlević	·	2.6 km	MPC · JPL
134676	1999 WN_{11}	—	November 29, 1999	Nachi-Katsuura	Shiozawa, H., T. Urata	·	2.5 km	MPC · JPL
134677	1999 WD_{14}	—	November 28, 1999	Kitt Peak	Spacewatch	V	1.7 km	MPC · JPL
134678	1999 WZ_{16}	—	November 30, 1999	Kitt Peak	Spacewatch	·	2.0 km	MPC · JPL
134679	1999 XX_{4}	—	December 4, 1999	Catalina	CSS	·	1.5 km	MPC · JPL
134680	1999 XX_{24}	—	December 6, 1999	Socorro	LINEAR	·	2.8 km	MPC · JPL
134681	1999 XC_{25}	—	December 6, 1999	Socorro	LINEAR	·	3.0 km	MPC · JPL
134682	1999 XM_{27}	—	December 6, 1999	Socorro	LINEAR	·	2.6 km	MPC · JPL
134683	1999 XO_{28}	—	December 6, 1999	Socorro	LINEAR	NYS	1.8 km	MPC · JPL
134684	1999 XM_{32}	—	December 6, 1999	Socorro	LINEAR	·	2.7 km	MPC · JPL
134685	1999 XJ_{43}	—	December 7, 1999	Socorro	LINEAR	·	1.8 km	MPC · JPL
134686	1999 XP_{50}	—	December 7, 1999	Socorro	LINEAR	·	2.6 km	MPC · JPL
134687	1999 XL_{56}	—	December 7, 1999	Socorro	LINEAR	MAS ·	3.6 km	MPC · JPL
134688	1999 XS_{58}	—	December 7, 1999	Socorro	LINEAR	·	1.9 km	MPC · JPL
134689	1999 XO_{61}	—	December 7, 1999	Socorro	LINEAR	NYS	1.6 km	MPC · JPL
134690	1999 XP_{61}	—	December 7, 1999	Socorro	LINEAR	3:2	9.9 km	MPC · JPL
134691	1999 XR_{61}	—	December 7, 1999	Socorro	LINEAR	NYS	1.5 km	MPC · JPL
134692	1999 XV_{66}	—	December 7, 1999	Socorro	LINEAR	·	2.4 km	MPC · JPL
134693	1999 XP_{67}	—	December 7, 1999	Socorro	LINEAR	·	2.5 km	MPC · JPL
134694	1999 XX_{72}	—	December 7, 1999	Socorro	LINEAR	·	970 m	MPC · JPL
134695	1999 XR_{82}	—	December 7, 1999	Socorro	LINEAR	ERI	4.0 km	MPC · JPL
134696	1999 XZ_{96}	—	December 7, 1999	Socorro	LINEAR	slow	1.6 km	MPC · JPL
134697	1999 XG_{105}	—	December 8, 1999	Ondřejov	P. Kušnirák, P. Pravec	·	1.4 km	MPC · JPL
134698	1999 XY_{115}	—	December 5, 1999	Catalina	CSS	·	3.6 km	MPC · JPL
134699	1999 XX_{118}	—	December 5, 1999	Catalina	CSS	NYS	1.9 km	MPC · JPL
134700	1999 XB_{120}	—	December 5, 1999	Catalina	CSS	·	2.0 km	MPC · JPL

== 134701–134800 ==
back to top

Designation			Discovery			Properties		Ref
Permanent	Provisional	Named after	Date	Site	Discoverer(s)	Category	Diam.	Ref
134701	1999 XT_{122}	—	December 7, 1999	Catalina	CSS	ERI	1.3 km	MPC · JPL
134702	1999 XQ_{125}	—	December 7, 1999	Catalina	CSS	V	1.5 km	MPC · JPL
134703	1999 XM_{137}	—	December 2, 1999	Anderson Mesa	LONEOS	·	1.9 km	MPC · JPL
134704	1999 XS_{156}	—	December 8, 1999	Socorro	LINEAR	NYS	1.6 km	MPC · JPL
134705	1999 XA_{186}	—	December 12, 1999	Socorro	LINEAR	·	3.5 km	MPC · JPL
134706	1999 XK_{202}	—	December 12, 1999	Socorro	LINEAR	EUN	2.6 km	MPC · JPL
134707	1999 XD_{212}	—	December 13, 1999	Socorro	LINEAR	·	2.3 km	MPC · JPL
134708	1999 XR_{215}	—	December 14, 1999	Socorro	LINEAR	·	3.2 km	MPC · JPL
134709	1999 XT_{228}	—	December 14, 1999	Kitt Peak	Spacewatch	·	1.8 km	MPC · JPL
134710	1999 XR_{230}	—	December 7, 1999	Anderson Mesa	LONEOS	·	2.1 km	MPC · JPL
134711	1999 XV_{241}	—	December 13, 1999	Anderson Mesa	LONEOS	·	2.2 km	MPC · JPL
134712	1999 XZ_{248}	—	December 6, 1999	Socorro	LINEAR	·	2.3 km	MPC · JPL
134713	1999 XC_{251}	—	December 5, 1999	Kitt Peak	Spacewatch	NYS	2.2 km	MPC · JPL
134714	1999 XJ_{254}	—	December 12, 1999	Kitt Peak	Spacewatch	·	1.6 km	MPC · JPL
134715	1999 YJ_{14}	—	December 31, 1999	Kitt Peak	Spacewatch	·	1.9 km	MPC · JPL
134716	1999 YL_{16}	—	December 31, 1999	Kitt Peak	Spacewatch	·	2.4 km	MPC · JPL
134717	2000 AO_{1}	—	January 2, 2000	Socorro	LINEAR	·	7.9 km	MPC · JPL
134718	2000 AP_{12}	—	January 3, 2000	Socorro	LINEAR	·	3.2 km	MPC · JPL
134719	2000 AF_{14}	—	January 3, 2000	Socorro	LINEAR	·	1.8 km	MPC · JPL
134720	2000 AX_{29}	—	January 3, 2000	Socorro	LINEAR	L4	28 km	MPC · JPL
134721	2000 AE_{32}	—	January 3, 2000	Socorro	LINEAR	·	3.1 km	MPC · JPL
134722	2000 AL_{37}	—	January 3, 2000	Socorro	LINEAR	·	2.1 km	MPC · JPL
134723	2000 AV_{38}	—	January 3, 2000	Socorro	LINEAR	·	2.5 km	MPC · JPL
134724	2000 AE_{40}	—	January 3, 2000	Socorro	LINEAR	·	3.2 km	MPC · JPL
134725	2000 AX_{52}	—	January 4, 2000	Socorro	LINEAR	ERI	4.3 km	MPC · JPL
134726	2000 AJ_{67}	—	January 4, 2000	Socorro	LINEAR	·	2.6 km	MPC · JPL
134727	2000 AR_{68}	—	January 5, 2000	Socorro	LINEAR	V	1.4 km	MPC · JPL
134728	2000 AN_{77}	—	January 5, 2000	Socorro	LINEAR	·	2.1 km	MPC · JPL
134729	2000 AP_{92}	—	January 2, 2000	Socorro	LINEAR	PHO	2.7 km	MPC · JPL
134730	2000 AX_{97}	—	January 4, 2000	Socorro	LINEAR	H	1.4 km	MPC · JPL
134731	2000 AU_{101}	—	January 5, 2000	Socorro	LINEAR	·	2.5 km	MPC · JPL
134732	2000 AW_{122}	—	January 5, 2000	Socorro	LINEAR	·	2.0 km	MPC · JPL
134733	2000 AA_{130}	—	January 5, 2000	Socorro	LINEAR	·	5.7 km	MPC · JPL
134734	2000 AQ_{130}	—	January 5, 2000	Socorro	LINEAR	·	3.0 km	MPC · JPL
134735	2000 AV_{144}	—	January 5, 2000	Socorro	LINEAR	EUN	3.8 km	MPC · JPL
134736	2000 AS_{151}	—	January 8, 2000	Socorro	LINEAR	·	2.6 km	MPC · JPL
134737	2000 AO_{155}	—	January 3, 2000	Socorro	LINEAR	·	2.6 km	MPC · JPL
134738	2000 AM_{168}	—	January 13, 2000	Kleť	Kleť	·	3.3 km	MPC · JPL
134739	2000 AZ_{171}	—	January 7, 2000	Socorro	LINEAR	·	2.0 km	MPC · JPL
134740	2000 AX_{187}	—	January 8, 2000	Socorro	LINEAR	PHO	6.1 km	MPC · JPL
134741	2000 AM_{195}	—	January 8, 2000	Socorro	LINEAR	·	4.3 km	MPC · JPL
134742	2000 AK_{204}	—	January 14, 2000	Kleť	Kleť	·	2.6 km	MPC · JPL
134743	2000 AY_{230}	—	January 4, 2000	Anderson Mesa	LONEOS	·	2.2 km	MPC · JPL
134744	2000 AM_{232}	—	January 4, 2000	Socorro	LINEAR	·	3.7 km	MPC · JPL
134745	2000 AW_{247}	—	January 2, 2000	Socorro	LINEAR	·	3.7 km	MPC · JPL
134746	2000 BO_{6}	—	January 29, 2000	Socorro	LINEAR	H	980 m	MPC · JPL
134747	2000 BR_{10}	—	January 28, 2000	Kitt Peak	Spacewatch	·	2.1 km	MPC · JPL
134748	2000 BF_{14}	—	January 28, 2000	Uenohara	N. Kawasato	·	1.8 km	MPC · JPL
134749	2000 BT_{24}	—	January 29, 2000	Socorro	LINEAR	L4	26 km	MPC · JPL
134750	2000 BE_{26}	—	January 30, 2000	Socorro	LINEAR	·	2.1 km	MPC · JPL
134751	2000 BJ_{34}	—	January 30, 2000	Catalina	CSS	HNS	2.3 km	MPC · JPL
134752	2000 BQ_{35}	—	January 30, 2000	Kitt Peak	Spacewatch	(13314)	4.7 km	MPC · JPL
134753	2000 CY_{1}	—	February 3, 2000	Farpoint	Farpoint	·	3.2 km	MPC · JPL
134754	2000 CP_{7}	—	February 2, 2000	Socorro	LINEAR	MRX	2.5 km	MPC · JPL
134755	2000 CZ_{9}	—	February 2, 2000	Socorro	LINEAR	·	1.3 km	MPC · JPL
134756	2000 CP_{11}	—	February 2, 2000	Socorro	LINEAR	·	2.5 km	MPC · JPL
134757	2000 CM_{27}	—	February 2, 2000	Socorro	LINEAR	HNS	2.0 km	MPC · JPL
134758	2000 CZ_{29}	—	February 2, 2000	Socorro	LINEAR	·	3.3 km	MPC · JPL
134759	2000 CJ_{33}	—	February 1, 2000	Catalina	CSS	H	730 m	MPC · JPL
134760	2000 CT_{60}	—	February 2, 2000	Socorro	LINEAR	·	4.3 km	MPC · JPL
134761	2000 CN_{77}	—	February 8, 2000	Prescott	P. G. Comba	PHO	1.5 km	MPC · JPL
134762	2000 CU_{87}	—	February 4, 2000	Socorro	LINEAR	·	3.2 km	MPC · JPL
134763	2000 CY_{89}	—	February 5, 2000	Socorro	LINEAR	·	3.5 km	MPC · JPL
134764	2000 CJ_{91}	—	February 6, 2000	Socorro	LINEAR	·	3.3 km	MPC · JPL
134765	2000 CX_{93}	—	February 8, 2000	Socorro	LINEAR	(5)	2.3 km	MPC · JPL
134766	2000 CY_{102}	—	February 5, 2000	Socorro	LINEAR	H	1.2 km	MPC · JPL
134767	2000 CS_{113}	—	February 11, 2000	Socorro	LINEAR	L4	15 km	MPC · JPL
134768	2000 CC_{125}	—	February 3, 2000	Socorro	LINEAR	·	2.5 km	MPC · JPL
134769	2000 DB_{1}	—	February 25, 2000	Socorro	LINEAR	H	920 m	MPC · JPL
134770	2000 DP_{10}	—	February 26, 2000	Kitt Peak	Spacewatch	·	2.1 km	MPC · JPL
134771	2000 DA_{20}	—	February 29, 2000	Socorro	LINEAR	·	2.2 km	MPC · JPL
134772	2000 DY_{25}	—	February 29, 2000	Socorro	LINEAR	(5)	2.9 km	MPC · JPL
134773	2000 DS_{27}	—	February 29, 2000	Socorro	LINEAR	·	2.1 km	MPC · JPL
134774	2000 DA_{30}	—	February 29, 2000	Socorro	LINEAR	·	1.9 km	MPC · JPL
134775	2000 DT_{34}	—	February 29, 2000	Socorro	LINEAR	·	3.0 km	MPC · JPL
134776	2000 DN_{52}	—	February 29, 2000	Socorro	LINEAR	WIT	2.1 km	MPC · JPL
134777	2000 DB_{64}	—	February 29, 2000	Socorro	LINEAR	·	2.6 km	MPC · JPL
134778	2000 DW_{67}	—	February 29, 2000	Socorro	LINEAR	·	2.7 km	MPC · JPL
134779	2000 DZ_{69}	—	February 29, 2000	Socorro	LINEAR	·	2.7 km	MPC · JPL
134780	2000 DL_{72}	—	February 29, 2000	Socorro	LINEAR	·	3.4 km	MPC · JPL
134781	2000 DB_{77}	—	February 29, 2000	Socorro	LINEAR	EUN	2.1 km	MPC · JPL
134782	2000 DR_{78}	—	February 29, 2000	Socorro	LINEAR	·	3.6 km	MPC · JPL
134783	2000 DZ_{90}	—	February 27, 2000	Kitt Peak	Spacewatch	·	2.1 km	MPC · JPL
134784	2000 DO_{93}	—	February 28, 2000	Socorro	LINEAR	·	1.9 km	MPC · JPL
134785	2000 DK_{107}	—	February 29, 2000	Socorro	LINEAR	MAR	1.6 km	MPC · JPL
134786	2000 DH_{109}	—	February 29, 2000	Socorro	LINEAR	·	2.7 km	MPC · JPL
134787	2000 DY_{111}	—	February 29, 2000	Socorro	LINEAR	·	2.5 km	MPC · JPL
134788	2000 DJ_{117}	—	February 25, 2000	Kitt Peak	Spacewatch	·	2.3 km	MPC · JPL
134789	2000 EC_{3}	—	March 3, 2000	Socorro	LINEAR	GEF	2.1 km	MPC · JPL
134790	2000 EH_{4}	—	March 4, 2000	Socorro	LINEAR	·	6.3 km	MPC · JPL
134791	2000 EQ_{7}	—	March 3, 2000	Kitt Peak	Spacewatch	·	3.1 km	MPC · JPL
134792	2000 EH_{13}	—	March 5, 2000	Socorro	LINEAR	·	5.8 km	MPC · JPL
134793	2000 EH_{15}	—	March 5, 2000	Gnosca	S. Sposetti	·	3.8 km	MPC · JPL
134794	2000 EW_{17}	—	March 4, 2000	Socorro	LINEAR	EUN	4.7 km	MPC · JPL
134795	2000 EV_{18}	—	March 5, 2000	Socorro	LINEAR	·	2.7 km	MPC · JPL
134796	2000 ER_{19}	—	March 5, 2000	Socorro	LINEAR	(5)	2.3 km	MPC · JPL
134797	2000 EE_{25}	—	March 8, 2000	Kitt Peak	Spacewatch	·	1.9 km	MPC · JPL
134798	2000 EN_{30}	—	March 5, 2000	Socorro	LINEAR	·	3.6 km	MPC · JPL
134799	2000 ES_{30}	—	March 5, 2000	Socorro	LINEAR	EUN	3.6 km	MPC · JPL
134800	2000 EJ_{31}	—	March 5, 2000	Socorro	LINEAR	·	3.2 km	MPC · JPL

== 134801–134900 ==
back to top

Designation			Discovery			Properties		Ref
Permanent	Provisional	Named after	Date	Site	Discoverer(s)	Category	Diam.	Ref
134801	2000 ES_{40}	—	March 8, 2000	Socorro	LINEAR	GEF	2.5 km	MPC · JPL
134802	2000 EW_{87}	—	March 8, 2000	Socorro	LINEAR	EUN	2.5 km	MPC · JPL
134803	2000 ER_{95}	—	March 10, 2000	Socorro	LINEAR	·	3.4 km	MPC · JPL
134804	2000 EP_{98}	—	March 9, 2000	Kitt Peak	Spacewatch	DOR	5.3 km	MPC · JPL
134805	2000 EV_{114}	—	March 10, 2000	Kitt Peak	Spacewatch	·	3.0 km	MPC · JPL
134806	2000 EM_{162}	—	March 3, 2000	Socorro	LINEAR	·	3.5 km	MPC · JPL
134807	2000 EJ_{164}	—	March 3, 2000	Socorro	LINEAR	·	3.0 km	MPC · JPL
134808	2000 EO_{165}	—	March 3, 2000	Socorro	LINEAR	·	2.9 km	MPC · JPL
134809	2000 EO_{169}	—	March 4, 2000	Socorro	LINEAR	·	6.8 km	MPC · JPL
134810	2000 EB_{182}	—	March 4, 2000	Socorro	LINEAR	·	4.0 km	MPC · JPL
134811	2000 EU_{185}	—	March 1, 2000	Kitt Peak	Spacewatch	·	2.8 km	MPC · JPL
134812	2000 EA_{192}	—	March 3, 2000	Socorro	LINEAR	·	3.7 km	MPC · JPL
134813	2000 FB_{3}	—	March 27, 2000	Socorro	LINEAR	H	890 m	MPC · JPL
134814	2000 FQ_{23}	—	March 29, 2000	Socorro	LINEAR	·	6.2 km	MPC · JPL
134815	2000 FA_{30}	—	March 27, 2000	Anderson Mesa	LONEOS	·	6.4 km	MPC · JPL
134816	2000 GQ_{4}	—	April 4, 2000	Socorro	LINEAR	H	1.2 km	MPC · JPL
134817	2000 GB_{11}	—	April 5, 2000	Socorro	LINEAR	·	2.2 km	MPC · JPL
134818	2000 GH_{18}	—	April 5, 2000	Socorro	LINEAR	RAF	2.3 km	MPC · JPL
134819	2000 GW_{20}	—	April 5, 2000	Socorro	LINEAR	·	3.1 km	MPC · JPL
134820	2000 GE_{82}	—	April 7, 2000	Socorro	LINEAR	H	1.0 km	MPC · JPL
134821	2000 GR_{107}	—	April 7, 2000	Socorro	LINEAR	·	6.8 km	MPC · JPL
134822	2000 GK_{110}	—	April 2, 2000	Anderson Mesa	LONEOS	PAD	3.5 km	MPC · JPL
134823	2000 GR_{119}	—	April 5, 2000	Kitt Peak	Spacewatch	·	4.2 km	MPC · JPL
134824	2000 GT_{148}	—	April 5, 2000	Socorro	LINEAR	·	4.8 km	MPC · JPL
134825	2000 GL_{153}	—	April 6, 2000	Anderson Mesa	LONEOS	·	3.0 km	MPC · JPL
134826	2000 HD_{2}	—	April 25, 2000	Kitt Peak	Spacewatch	(5)	2.4 km	MPC · JPL
134827	2000 HP_{5}	—	April 24, 2000	Kitt Peak	Spacewatch	·	3.7 km	MPC · JPL
134828	2000 HU_{40}	—	April 28, 2000	Socorro	LINEAR	·	5.4 km	MPC · JPL
134829	2000 HV_{41}	—	April 28, 2000	Socorro	LINEAR	·	4.7 km	MPC · JPL
134830	2000 HU_{55}	—	April 24, 2000	Anderson Mesa	LONEOS	·	4.0 km	MPC · JPL
134831	2000 HO_{60}	—	April 25, 2000	Anderson Mesa	LONEOS	KOR	2.6 km	MPC · JPL
134832	2000 HT_{61}	—	April 25, 2000	Anderson Mesa	LONEOS	·	4.5 km	MPC · JPL
134833	2000 HM_{68}	—	April 28, 2000	Kitt Peak	Spacewatch	·	3.6 km	MPC · JPL
134834	2000 HO_{73}	—	April 27, 2000	Anderson Mesa	LONEOS	H	940 m	MPC · JPL
134835	2000 HX_{76}	—	April 27, 2000	Socorro	LINEAR	·	4.9 km	MPC · JPL
134836	2000 HB_{85}	—	April 30, 2000	Anderson Mesa	LONEOS	H	1.1 km	MPC · JPL
134837	2000 JF_{7}	—	May 1, 2000	Haleakala	NEAT	H	1.1 km	MPC · JPL
134838	2000 JF_{20}	—	May 6, 2000	Socorro	LINEAR	·	3.0 km	MPC · JPL
134839	2000 JN_{25}	—	May 7, 2000	Socorro	LINEAR	·	3.5 km	MPC · JPL
134840	2000 JT_{55}	—	May 6, 2000	Socorro	LINEAR	·	6.4 km	MPC · JPL
134841	2000 JL_{57}	—	May 6, 2000	Socorro	LINEAR	·	4.9 km	MPC · JPL
134842	2000 JJ_{65}	—	May 5, 2000	Socorro	LINEAR	·	4.1 km	MPC · JPL
134843	2000 JG_{79}	—	May 5, 2000	Kitt Peak	Spacewatch	·	3.0 km	MPC · JPL
134844	2000 JX_{80}	—	May 1, 2000	Anderson Mesa	LONEOS	AGN	2.1 km	MPC · JPL
134845	2000 KO_{4}	—	May 27, 2000	Socorro	LINEAR	H	1.3 km	MPC · JPL
134846	2000 KN_{13}	—	May 28, 2000	Socorro	LINEAR	·	4.8 km	MPC · JPL
134847	2000 KF_{48}	—	May 27, 2000	Socorro	LINEAR	TIR	6.1 km	MPC · JPL
134848	2000 KE_{54}	—	May 27, 2000	Anderson Mesa	LONEOS	·	6.2 km	MPC · JPL
134849	2000 KO_{65}	—	May 27, 2000	Anderson Mesa	LONEOS	AEG	4.9 km	MPC · JPL
134850	2000 KJ_{83}	—	May 28, 2000	Anderson Mesa	LONEOS	T_{j} (2.97)	7.2 km	MPC · JPL
134851	2000 LG_{28}	—	June 6, 2000	Anderson Mesa	LONEOS	·	13 km	MPC · JPL
134852	2000 MM	—	June 24, 2000	Haleakala	NEAT	EUP	7.0 km	MPC · JPL
134853	2000 NW_{10}	—	July 7, 2000	Anderson Mesa	LONEOS	·	6.0 km	MPC · JPL
134854	2000 OC_{18}	—	July 23, 2000	Socorro	LINEAR	·	5.0 km	MPC · JPL
134855	2000 OK_{21}	—	July 23, 2000	Socorro	LINEAR	·	9.6 km	MPC · JPL
134856	2000 OY_{26}	—	July 23, 2000	Socorro	LINEAR	·	1.2 km	MPC · JPL
134857	2000 OD_{27}	—	July 23, 2000	Socorro	LINEAR	·	6.8 km	MPC · JPL
134858	2000 OW_{54}	—	July 29, 2000	Anderson Mesa	LONEOS	·	7.9 km	MPC · JPL
134859	2000 OF_{60}	—	July 29, 2000	Anderson Mesa	LONEOS	·	8.9 km	MPC · JPL
134860	2000 OJ_{67}	—	July 29, 2000	Cerro Tololo	M. W. Buie, Kern, S. D.	cubewano (cold) · moon	138 km	MPC · JPL
134861	2000 OT_{68}	—	July 29, 2000	Anderson Mesa	LONEOS	·	2.5 km	MPC · JPL
134862	2000 PE_{2}	—	August 1, 2000	Socorro	LINEAR	·	9.6 km	MPC · JPL
134863	2000 PX_{5}	—	August 2, 2000	Socorro	LINEAR	·	1.3 km	MPC · JPL
134864	2000 PA_{15}	—	August 1, 2000	Socorro	LINEAR	·	4.7 km	MPC · JPL
134865	2000 QO_{5}	—	August 24, 2000	Socorro	LINEAR	·	6.2 km	MPC · JPL
134866	2000 QG_{16}	—	August 24, 2000	Socorro	LINEAR	·	3.1 km	MPC · JPL
134867	2000 QA_{18}	—	August 24, 2000	Socorro	LINEAR	THM	5.3 km	MPC · JPL
134868	2000 QE_{21}	—	August 24, 2000	Socorro	LINEAR	CYB	7.9 km	MPC · JPL
134869	2000 QZ_{23}	—	August 25, 2000	Socorro	LINEAR	·	6.7 km	MPC · JPL
134870	2000 QQ_{82}	—	August 24, 2000	Socorro	LINEAR	CYB	7.2 km	MPC · JPL
134871	2000 QT_{84}	—	August 25, 2000	Socorro	LINEAR	·	7.5 km	MPC · JPL
134872	2000 QV_{85}	—	August 25, 2000	Socorro	LINEAR	HYG	5.2 km	MPC · JPL
134873	2000 QR_{89}	—	August 25, 2000	Socorro	LINEAR	·	12 km	MPC · JPL
134874	2000 QA_{111}	—	August 24, 2000	Socorro	LINEAR	·	3.8 km	MPC · JPL
134875	2000 QE_{112}	—	August 24, 2000	Socorro	LINEAR	·	5.4 km	MPC · JPL
134876	2000 QB_{117}	—	August 29, 2000	Socorro	LINEAR	·	5.6 km	MPC · JPL
134877	2000 QN_{135}	—	August 26, 2000	Socorro	LINEAR	·	6.4 km	MPC · JPL
134878	2000 QS_{195}	—	August 26, 2000	Socorro	LINEAR	·	3.3 km	MPC · JPL
134879	2000 QZ_{214}	—	August 31, 2000	Socorro	LINEAR	·	2.9 km	MPC · JPL
134880	2000 QF_{223}	—	August 21, 2000	Anderson Mesa	LONEOS	·	6.7 km	MPC · JPL
134881	2000 QL_{223}	—	August 21, 2000	Anderson Mesa	LONEOS	·	5.7 km	MPC · JPL
134882	2000 RH_{31}	—	September 1, 2000	Socorro	LINEAR	(883)	1.6 km	MPC · JPL
134883	2000 RE_{36}	—	September 3, 2000	Kitt Peak	Spacewatch	·	1.3 km	MPC · JPL
134884	2000 RY_{79}	—	September 1, 2000	Socorro	LINEAR	·	7.0 km	MPC · JPL
134885	2000 SZ_{38}	—	September 24, 2000	Socorro	LINEAR	·	7.3 km	MPC · JPL
134886	2000 SR_{62}	—	September 24, 2000	Socorro	LINEAR	·	2.3 km	MPC · JPL
134887	2000 SL_{103}	—	September 24, 2000	Socorro	LINEAR	NYS	2.3 km	MPC · JPL
134888	2000 SG_{128}	—	September 24, 2000	Socorro	LINEAR	·	1.3 km	MPC · JPL
134889	2000 SU_{191}	—	September 24, 2000	Socorro	LINEAR	·	1.3 km	MPC · JPL
134890	2000 SO_{215}	—	September 26, 2000	Socorro	LINEAR	·	3.3 km	MPC · JPL
134891	2000 SA_{223}	—	September 27, 2000	Socorro	LINEAR	·	3.4 km	MPC · JPL
134892	2000 SY_{256}	—	September 24, 2000	Socorro	LINEAR	·	3.8 km	MPC · JPL
134893	2000 SA_{258}	—	September 24, 2000	Socorro	LINEAR	·	1.2 km	MPC · JPL
134894	2000 SM_{259}	—	September 24, 2000	Socorro	LINEAR	·	3.1 km	MPC · JPL
134895	2000 UC_{13}	—	October 25, 2000	Socorro	LINEAR	·	2.8 km	MPC · JPL
134896	2000 WH_{13}	—	November 21, 2000	Socorro	LINEAR	·	1.3 km	MPC · JPL
134897	2000 WM_{13}	—	November 21, 2000	Socorro	LINEAR	PHO	3.9 km	MPC · JPL
134898	2000 WT_{75}	—	November 20, 2000	Socorro	LINEAR	·	1.4 km	MPC · JPL
134899	2000 WV_{106}	—	November 20, 2000	Socorro	LINEAR	·	1.3 km	MPC · JPL
134900	2000 WT_{120}	—	November 20, 2000	Socorro	LINEAR	JUN	2.7 km	MPC · JPL

== 134901–135000 ==
back to top

Designation			Discovery			Properties		Ref
Permanent	Provisional	Named after	Date	Site	Discoverer(s)	Category	Diam.	Ref
134901	2000 WY_{156}	—	November 30, 2000	Socorro	LINEAR	·	4.1 km	MPC · JPL
134902	2000 WU_{159}	—	November 20, 2000	Anderson Mesa	LONEOS	·	1.2 km	MPC · JPL
134903	2000 XZ_{9}	—	December 1, 2000	Socorro	LINEAR	·	1.5 km	MPC · JPL
134904	2000 XR_{17}	—	December 1, 2000	Socorro	LINEAR	·	1.7 km	MPC · JPL
134905	2000 XA_{26}	—	December 4, 2000	Socorro	LINEAR	·	1.8 km	MPC · JPL
134906	2000 XO_{33}	—	December 4, 2000	Socorro	LINEAR	·	1.6 km	MPC · JPL
134907	2000 YL_{13}	—	December 21, 2000	Kitt Peak	Spacewatch	·	1.1 km	MPC · JPL
134908	2000 YM_{32}	—	December 30, 2000	Socorro	LINEAR	·	1.7 km	MPC · JPL
134909	2000 YC_{37}	—	December 30, 2000	Socorro	LINEAR	T_{j} (2.98) · 3:2	8.9 km	MPC · JPL
134910	2000 YL_{39}	—	December 30, 2000	Socorro	LINEAR	·	2.7 km	MPC · JPL
134911	2000 YM_{42}	—	December 30, 2000	Socorro	LINEAR	·	2.3 km	MPC · JPL
134912	2000 YC_{44}	—	December 30, 2000	Socorro	LINEAR	·	1.3 km	MPC · JPL
134913	2000 YZ_{45}	—	December 30, 2000	Socorro	LINEAR	·	1.5 km	MPC · JPL
134914	2000 YC_{51}	—	December 30, 2000	Socorro	LINEAR	·	2.3 km	MPC · JPL
134915	2000 YV_{51}	—	December 30, 2000	Socorro	LINEAR	V	1.3 km	MPC · JPL
134916	2000 YP_{53}	—	December 30, 2000	Socorro	LINEAR	·	2.3 km	MPC · JPL
134917	2000 YS_{53}	—	December 30, 2000	Socorro	LINEAR	V	1.2 km	MPC · JPL
134918	2000 YE_{55}	—	December 30, 2000	Socorro	LINEAR	·	1.5 km	MPC · JPL
134919	2000 YM_{59}	—	December 30, 2000	Socorro	LINEAR	·	1.2 km	MPC · JPL
134920	2000 YU_{92}	—	December 30, 2000	Socorro	LINEAR	V	1.2 km	MPC · JPL
134921	2000 YD_{98}	—	December 30, 2000	Socorro	LINEAR	·	1.4 km	MPC · JPL
134922	2000 YV_{104}	—	December 28, 2000	Socorro	LINEAR	PHO	3.6 km	MPC · JPL
134923	2000 YQ_{111}	—	December 30, 2000	Socorro	LINEAR	GEF	2.5 km	MPC · JPL
134924	2000 YC_{115}	—	December 30, 2000	Socorro	LINEAR	·	1.5 km	MPC · JPL
134925	2000 YO_{117}	—	December 30, 2000	Socorro	LINEAR	V	1.4 km	MPC · JPL
134926	2000 YS_{117}	—	December 30, 2000	Socorro	LINEAR	·	1.7 km	MPC · JPL
134927	2000 YB_{132}	—	December 30, 2000	Socorro	LINEAR	·	1.7 km	MPC · JPL
134928	2001 AG_{2}	—	January 2, 2001	Kitt Peak	Spacewatch	·	1.3 km	MPC · JPL
134929	2001 AT_{16}	—	January 2, 2001	Socorro	LINEAR	·	2.5 km	MPC · JPL
134930	2001 AH_{26}	—	January 5, 2001	Socorro	LINEAR	·	1.6 km	MPC · JPL
134931	2001 AN_{33}	—	January 4, 2001	Socorro	LINEAR	(2076)	1.4 km	MPC · JPL
134932	2001 BQ_{5}	—	January 19, 2001	Socorro	LINEAR	·	1.6 km	MPC · JPL
134933	2001 BZ_{5}	—	January 18, 2001	Socorro	LINEAR	V	1.2 km	MPC · JPL
134934	2001 BT_{9}	—	January 19, 2001	Socorro	LINEAR	·	2.5 km	MPC · JPL
134935	2001 BL_{11}	—	January 21, 2001	Fair Oaks Ranch	J. V. McClusky	·	3.2 km	MPC · JPL
134936	2001 BV_{13}	—	January 22, 2001	Oaxaca	Roe, J. M.	·	2.8 km	MPC · JPL
134937	2001 BH_{21}	—	January 19, 2001	Socorro	LINEAR	V	1.4 km	MPC · JPL
134938	2001 BW_{29}	—	January 20, 2001	Socorro	LINEAR	V	1.2 km	MPC · JPL
134939	2001 BY_{35}	—	January 18, 2001	Socorro	LINEAR	·	3.4 km	MPC · JPL
134940	2001 BR_{37}	—	January 21, 2001	Socorro	LINEAR	·	1.2 km	MPC · JPL
134941	2001 BM_{47}	—	January 21, 2001	Socorro	LINEAR	H	1.2 km	MPC · JPL
134942	2001 BO_{53}	—	January 17, 2001	Haleakala	NEAT	·	1.8 km	MPC · JPL
134943	2001 BB_{54}	—	January 18, 2001	Kitt Peak	Spacewatch	·	1.5 km	MPC · JPL
134944	2001 BY_{57}	—	January 21, 2001	Socorro	LINEAR	(2076)	1.4 km	MPC · JPL
134945	2001 BN_{60}	—	January 25, 2001	Haleakala	NEAT	(2076)	1.4 km	MPC · JPL
134946	2001 BH_{62}	—	January 26, 2001	Socorro	LINEAR	·	4.0 km	MPC · JPL
134947	2001 BD_{74}	—	January 31, 2001	Kitt Peak	Spacewatch	·	2.3 km	MPC · JPL
134948	2001 BL_{82}	—	January 24, 2001	Kitt Peak	Spacewatch	KOR	2.2 km	MPC · JPL
134949	2001 CR	—	February 1, 2001	Socorro	LINEAR	·	1.6 km	MPC · JPL
134950	2001 CX_{5}	—	February 1, 2001	Socorro	LINEAR	·	2.5 km	MPC · JPL
134951	2001 CK_{7}	—	February 1, 2001	Socorro	LINEAR	·	1.5 km	MPC · JPL
134952	2001 CB_{12}	—	February 1, 2001	Socorro	LINEAR	V	1.2 km	MPC · JPL
134953	2001 CV_{20}	—	February 4, 2001	Socorro	LINEAR	PHO	2.1 km	MPC · JPL
134954	2001 CL_{27}	—	February 2, 2001	Anderson Mesa	LONEOS	·	1.8 km	MPC · JPL
134955	2001 CQ_{39}	—	February 13, 2001	Socorro	LINEAR	·	1.9 km	MPC · JPL
134956	2001 DJ_{8}	—	February 17, 2001	Haleakala	NEAT	PHO	2.0 km	MPC · JPL
134957	2001 DN_{18}	—	February 16, 2001	Socorro	LINEAR	L4	26 km	MPC · JPL
134958	2001 DX_{27}	—	February 17, 2001	Socorro	LINEAR	·	1.6 km	MPC · JPL
134959	2001 DU_{34}	—	February 19, 2001	Socorro	LINEAR	·	1.7 km	MPC · JPL
134960	2001 DW_{37}	—	February 19, 2001	Socorro	LINEAR	·	1.5 km	MPC · JPL
134961	2001 DN_{41}	—	February 19, 2001	Socorro	LINEAR	·	1.9 km	MPC · JPL
134962	2001 DB_{64}	—	February 19, 2001	Socorro	LINEAR	NYS	1.6 km	MPC · JPL
134963	2001 DM_{78}	—	February 22, 2001	Kitt Peak	Spacewatch	V	1.0 km	MPC · JPL
134964	2001 DB_{97}	—	February 17, 2001	Socorro	LINEAR	·	2.1 km	MPC · JPL
134965	2001 DQ_{99}	—	February 17, 2001	Haleakala	NEAT	L4	19 km	MPC · JPL
134966	2001 DO_{102}	—	February 16, 2001	Socorro	LINEAR	·	1.9 km	MPC · JPL
134967	2001 DR_{103}	—	February 16, 2001	Haleakala	NEAT	·	2.9 km	MPC · JPL
134968	2001 DJ_{107}	—	February 19, 2001	Socorro	LINEAR	·	1.4 km	MPC · JPL
134969	2001 EL_{1}	—	March 1, 2001	Socorro	LINEAR	·	1.7 km	MPC · JPL
134970	2001 EZ_{9}	—	March 2, 2001	Anderson Mesa	LONEOS	·	4.4 km	MPC · JPL
134971	2001 EE_{21}	—	March 15, 2001	Anderson Mesa	LONEOS	PHO	1.6 km	MPC · JPL
134972	2001 EV_{24}	—	March 15, 2001	Socorro	LINEAR	·	2.7 km	MPC · JPL
134973	2001 FA	—	March 16, 2001	Badlands	Badlands	NYS	2.1 km	MPC · JPL
134974	2001 FS_{3}	—	March 18, 2001	Socorro	LINEAR	HNS	2.9 km	MPC · JPL
134975	2001 FJ_{10}	—	March 19, 2001	Anderson Mesa	LONEOS	·	1.8 km	MPC · JPL
134976	2001 FL_{30}	—	March 20, 2001	Haleakala	NEAT	·	2.3 km	MPC · JPL
134977	2001 FX_{30}	—	March 21, 2001	Haleakala	NEAT	·	1.8 km	MPC · JPL
134978	2001 FH_{40}	—	March 18, 2001	Socorro	LINEAR	·	2.7 km	MPC · JPL
134979	2001 FF_{53}	—	March 18, 2001	Socorro	LINEAR	·	3.0 km	MPC · JPL
134980	2001 FT_{54}	—	March 19, 2001	Socorro	LINEAR	V	1.3 km	MPC · JPL
134981	2001 FK_{57}	—	March 21, 2001	Haleakala	NEAT	·	5.6 km	MPC · JPL
134982	2001 FZ_{66}	—	March 19, 2001	Socorro	LINEAR	·	1.9 km	MPC · JPL
134983	2001 FP_{69}	—	March 19, 2001	Socorro	LINEAR	·	4.0 km	MPC · JPL
134984	2001 FU_{71}	—	March 19, 2001	Socorro	LINEAR	NYS	2.1 km	MPC · JPL
134985	2001 FY_{80}	—	March 23, 2001	Socorro	LINEAR	EUN	2.0 km	MPC · JPL
134986	2001 FE_{100}	—	March 17, 2001	Farpoint	Farpoint	·	4.5 km	MPC · JPL
134987	2001 FA_{114}	—	March 19, 2001	Anderson Mesa	LONEOS	·	2.0 km	MPC · JPL
134988	2001 FX_{115}	—	March 19, 2001	Anderson Mesa	LONEOS	·	2.2 km	MPC · JPL
134989	2001 FG_{123}	—	March 23, 2001	Anderson Mesa	LONEOS	·	2.1 km	MPC · JPL
134990	2001 FM_{131}	—	March 20, 2001	Haleakala	NEAT	EUN	2.1 km	MPC · JPL
134991	2001 FG_{138}	—	March 21, 2001	Haleakala	NEAT	SUL	3.3 km	MPC · JPL
134992	2001 FP_{138}	—	March 21, 2001	Haleakala	NEAT	·	2.1 km	MPC · JPL
134993	2001 FX_{146}	—	March 24, 2001	Anderson Mesa	LONEOS	·	4.9 km	MPC · JPL
134994	2001 FW_{151}	—	March 24, 2001	Haleakala	NEAT	MAR	1.7 km	MPC · JPL
134995	2001 FZ_{155}	—	March 26, 2001	Socorro	LINEAR	·	3.9 km	MPC · JPL
134996	2001 FD_{158}	—	March 27, 2001	Anderson Mesa	LONEOS	·	2.4 km	MPC · JPL
134997	2001 FE_{195}	—	March 24, 2001	Socorro	LINEAR	TEL	2.4 km	MPC · JPL
134998	2001 GU_{9}	—	April 15, 2001	Socorro	LINEAR	·	9.2 km	MPC · JPL
134999	2001 HC_{9}	—	April 16, 2001	Socorro	LINEAR	·	9.0 km	MPC · JPL
135000	2001 HT_{13}	—	April 21, 2001	Socorro	LINEAR	·	3.3 km	MPC · JPL

back to top

== See also ==
- Meanings of minor-planet names: 134001–135000
