= List of named minor planets: 20000–29999 =

This is a partial list of named minor planets in numerical order. It contains a total of 4,011 entries as of 9 November 2026. Minor planets for which no article exist are displayed in grey color and redirect to the list of minor planets (see List of minor planets § Main index).

== From 20,000 to 29,999 ==
- 20000 Varuna
- 20001 Marinakoren
- 20002 Tillysmith
- 20003 Andorfer
- 20004 Audrey-Lucienne
- 20005 Zagarella
- 20006 Albertus Magnus
- 20007 Marybrown
- 20008 Adacarrera
- 20009 Joerao
- 20010 Tomfrench
- 20011 Baryshnikov
- 20012 Ranke
- 20013 Nureyev
- 20014 Annalisa
- 20015 Liguori
- 20016 Rietschel
- 20017 Alixcatherine
- 20018 Paulgray
- 20019 Yukiotanaka
- 20020 Mipach
- 20021 Kevinkell
- 20022 Dontown
- 20023 Jackmegas
- 20024 Mayrémartínez
- 20025 Petronaviera
- 20026 Bettyrobinson
- 20027 Michaelwatson
- 20028 Stansammy
- 20029 Dorner
- 20030 Bawtenheimer
- 20031 Lakehead
- 20032 McNish
- 20033 Michaelnoble
- 20034 Greenhalgh
- 20035 Lauriroche
- 20036 Marcboucher
- 20037 Duke
- 20038 Arasaki
- 20039 Danfalk
- 20040 Tatsuyamatsuyama
- 20041 Gainor
- 20042 Mortillaro
- 20043 Ellenmacarthur
- 20044 Vitoux
- 20045 Semeniuk
- 20046 Seronik
- 20047 Davidsuzuki
- 20048 Alfianello
- 20049 Antoniopresti
- 20050 Aglaonice
- 20051 Phanostrate
- 20052 Kellman
- 20053 Cavefish
- 20054 Lágrimaríos
- 20055 Maríaespínola
- 20056 Roccati
- 20057 Fabiorubeo
- 20058 Bundalian
- 20059 Debswoboda
- 20060 Johannforster
- 20061 Bilitza
- 20062 Matthewgriffin
- 20063 Kanakoseki
- 20064 Prahladagrawal
- 20065 Kminek
- 20066 Sagov
- 20067 Marthanieves
- 20068 Peterbarthel
- 20069 Monyer
- 20070 Koichiyuko
- 20071 Viareggio
- 20073 Yumiko
- 20074 Laskerschueler
- 20077 Borispodolsky
- 20078 Nathanrosen
- 20080 Maeharatorakichi
- 20081 Occhialini
- 20082 Yannlecun
- 20084 Buckmaster
- 20087 Abbiedonaldson
- 20088 Adambattle
- 20089 Áineobrien
- 20090 Albin
- 20091 Alfredoescalante
- 20092 Allisonmcgraw
- 20093 Andrewalberini
- 20094 Andrewcoates
- 20095 Andylopezoquendo
- 20096 Shiraishiakihiko
- 20098 Shibatagenji
- 20101 Robsullivan
- 20102 Takasago
- 20103 de Vico
- 20105 Linjingming
- 20106 Morton
- 20107 Nanyotenmondai
- 20109 Alicelandis
- 20112 Cassia
- 20113 Uckert
- 20114 Hikage
- 20115 Niheihajime
- 20117 Tannoakira
- 20120 Ryugatake
- 20123 Hansamundsen
- 20124 Marilynfogel
- 20126 Sandfordasher
- 20127 Benning
- 20128 Panconrad
- 20132 Huangwei
- 20134 Yeqisun
- 20135 Juels
- 20136 Eisenhart
- 20137 Àngeljorba
- 20138 Carinalee
- 20139 Marianeschi
- 20140 Costitx
- 20141 Markidger
- 20142 Joannaclark
- 20143 Julianegross
- 20145 Chiachiaolin
- 20148 Carducci
- 20149 Huh
- 20150 Changshuhong
- 20151 Utsunomiya
- 20152 Regberg
- 20155 Utewindolf
- 20156 Herbwindolf
- 20157 Andreaharrington
- 20158 Allton
- 20159 Snead
- 20160 Annałosiak
- 20164 Janzajíc
- 20165 Zeigler
- 20169 Ritchey
- 20171 Salerno
- 20172 Martin
- 20174 Eisenstein
- 20175 Starmus
- 20176 Aliciagoyena
- 20177 Richardallen
- 20179 Huangtianyi
- 20180 Annakolény
- 20186 Seda
- 20187 Janapittichová
- 20192 Thomasback
- 20193 Yakushima
- 20194 Ilarialocantore
- 20195 Mariovinci
- 20197 Enriques
- 20200 Donbacky
- 20204 Yuudurunosato
- 20205 Sitanchen
- 20206 Annewellbrock
- 20207 Dyckovsky
- 20208 Philiphe
- 20210 Athanasopoulos
- 20211 Joycegates
- 20212 Ekbaltouma
- 20213 Saurabhsharan
- 20214 Lorikenny
- 20217 Kathyclemmer
- 20218 Dukewriter
- 20219 Brianstone
- 20220 Beebe
- 20221 Bektešević
- 20222 Benseguane
- 20224 Johnrae
- 20225 Petrunin
- 20227 Bernardinelli
- 20228 Jeanmarcmari
- 20230 Blanchard
- 20234 Billgibson
- 20237 Clavius
- 20238 Krohm
- 20242 Sagot
- 20243 Den Bosch
- 20245 Peck
- 20246 Frappa
- 20249 Bincheng
- 20250 Burdanov
- 20251 Carminegiordano
- 20252 Eyjafjallajökull
- 20254 Úpice
- 20256 Adolfneckař
- 20259 Alanhoffman
- 20264 Chauhan
- 20265 Yuyinchen
- 20266 Danielchoi
- 20267 Carrieholt
- 20268 Racollier
- 20269 Cecilysunday
- 20270 Phildeutsch
- 20271 Allygoldberg
- 20272 Duyha
- 20273 Charlottebays
- 20274 Halperin
- 20275 Chrishamann
- 20276 Chrystianpereira
- 20277 Clementlee
- 20278 Qileihang
- 20279 Harel
- 20280 Colazo
- 20281 Kathartman
- 20282 Hedberg
- 20283 Elizaheller
- 20284 Andreilevin
- 20285 Lubin
- 20286 Michta
- 20287 Munteanu
- 20288 Nachbaur
- 20289 Nettimi
- 20290 Seanraj
- 20291 Raumurthy
- 20292 Eduardreznik
- 20293 Sirichelson
- 20295 Corgne
- 20296 Shayestorm
- 20297 Cristianomat
- 20298 Gordonsu
- 20299 Danielkelley
- 20300 Arjunsuri
- 20301 Thakur
- 20302 Kevinwang
- 20303 Lindwestrick
- 20304 Wolfson
- 20305 Feliciayen
- 20306 Richarnold
- 20307 Johnbarnes
- 20308 Daohaili
- 20309 Batalden
- 20310 Donggooroh
- 20311 Nancycarter
- 20312 Danahy
- 20313 Fredrikson
- 20314 Johnharrison
- 20315 Dotson
- 20316 Jerahalpern
- 20317 Hendrickson
- 20320 Eloypeña
- 20321 Lightdonovan
- 20322 Emilwilawer
- 20323 Tomlindstom
- 20324 Johnmahoney
- 20325 Julianoey
- 20326 Erard
- 20327 Fernandotinaut
- 20329 Manfro
- 20330 Manwell
- 20331 Bijemarks
- 20333 Johannhuth
- 20334 Glewitsky
- 20335 Charmartell
- 20336 Gretamills
- 20337 Naeve
- 20338 Elainepappas
- 20339 Eileenreed
- 20340 Susanruder
- 20341 Alanstack
- 20342 Trinh
- 20343 Vaccariello
- 20344 Filippotusberti
- 20345 Davidvito
- 20346 Firre
- 20347 Wunderlich
- 20348 Fodde
- 20349 Gabrielpinto
- 20350 Georgebrydon
- 20351 Kaborchardt
- 20352 Pinakibose
- 20353 Gianotto
- 20354 Rebeccachan
- 20355 Saraclark
- 20356 Giopoggiali
- 20357 Shireendhir
- 20358 Dalem
- 20360 Holsapple
- 20361 Romanishin
- 20362 Trilling
- 20363 Komitov
- 20364 Zdeněkmiler
- 20366 Bonev
- 20367 Erikagibb
- 20369 Giuliobaù
- 20370 Gkotsinas
- 20371 Ekladyous
- 20372 Juliafanning
- 20373 Fullmer
- 20374 Gomesjunior
- 20375 Sherrigerten
- 20376 Joyhines
- 20377 Jakubisin
- 20378 Graykowski
- 20379 Christijohns
- 20380 Grégoirehenry
- 20381 Hikaruyabuta
- 20382 Hiroshinaraoka
- 20383 Hirotakasawada
- 20384 Hongsuhyim
- 20385 Horiuchi
- 20386 Ianfranchi
- 20387 Iharakcsillik
- 20388 Ihorkyrylenko
- 20389 Imkedepater
- 20390 Isabelherreros
- 20391 Ivantsov
- 20392 Mikeshepard
- 20393 Kevinlane
- 20394 Fatou
- 20395 Jacquet
- 20396 Jaemannkyeong
- 20397 Jamierobinson
- 20399 Michaelesser
- 20400 Fabricius
- 20401 Janghyunpark
- 20403 Attenborough
- 20404 Javiersuarez
- 20405 Barryburke
- 20406 Jekanthanga
- 20407 Jessicaagarwal
- 20408 Jinbeniyama
- 20409 Joeychatelain
- 20410 Joosangyou
- 20411 Jooyeongeem
- 20412 Josémaríamadiedo
- 20413 Josephdemartini
- 20415 Amandalu
- 20416 Mansour
- 20418 Josephjao'
- 20419 Josephlazio
- 20420 Marashwhitman
- 20421 Joshelliott
- 20423 Juanluisrizos
- 20426 Fridlund
- 20427 Hjalmar
- 20430 Stout
- 20433 Prestinenza
- 20435 Juliendewit
- 20436 Julienserrecourt
- 20437 Selohusa
- 20438 Julievermersch
- 20439 Junghyunjo
- 20440 McClintock
- 20441 Elijahmena
- 20442 Kaiwünnermann
- 20444 Mamesser
- 20445 Kanakosakamoto
- 20446 Karolinadziadura
- 20447 Kateminker
- 20448 Kathrinaltwegg
- 20449 Katiejoy
- 20450 Marymohammed
- 20451 Galeotti
- 20452 Kerraouch
- 20453 Kimberleylim
- 20454 Pedrajo
- 20455 Pennell
- 20458 Koshkin
- 20459 Krzysztoflangner
- 20460 Robwhiteley
- 20461 Dioretsa
- 20465 Vervack
- 20467 Hibbitts
- 20468 Petercook
- 20469 Dudleymoore
- 20470 Kubica
- 20471 Kueny
- 20472 Mollypettit
- 20473 Lainey
- 20474 Reasoner
- 20475 Lauraparro
- 20476 Chanarich
- 20477 Anastroda
- 20478 Rutenberg
- 20479 Celisaucier
- 20480 Antonschraut
- 20481 Sharples
- 20482 Dustinshea
- 20483 Sinay
- 20484 Janetsong
- 20485 Léaferellec
- 20486 Lemos
- 20487 Lhotka
- 20488 Pic-du-Midi
- 20489 Lissauer
- 20490 Longobardo
- 20491 Ericstrege
- 20492 Luanalibeerato
- 20493 Lutzhecht
- 20495 Rimavská Sobota
- 20496 Jeník
- 20497 Mařenka
- 20500 Avner
- 20501 Luxiapoing
- 20502 Madeira
- 20503 Adamtazi
- 20504 Magbanua
- 20505 Makadia
- 20506 Mammana
- 20507 Marlaessens
- 20508 Marekhusárik
- 20509 Mariavarela
- 20510 Marjoriegalinier
- 20512 Rothenberg
- 20513 Lazio
- 20517 Judycrystal
- 20518 Rendtel
- 20522 Yogeshwar
- 20524 Bustersikes
- 20526 Bathompson
- 20527 Dajowestrich
- 20528 Kyleyawn
- 20529 Zwerling
- 20530 Johnayres
- 20531 Stevebabcock
- 20532 Benbilby
- 20533 Irmabonham
- 20534 Bozeman
- 20535 Marshburrows
- 20536 Tracicarter
- 20537 Sandraderosa
- 20538 Masakifujimoto
- 20539 Gadberry
- 20540 Marhalpern
- 20541 Matthewhopkins
- 20542 Maxwest
- 20543 Michaelfauerbach
- 20544 Kimhansell
- 20545 Karenhowell
- 20546 Michaelfrühauf
- 20547 Michimani
- 20548 Milewski
- 20549 Mirelatrelia
- 20550 Molnar-Bufanda
- 20551 Minikakamińska
- 20552 Moynier
- 20553 Donaldhowk
- 20554 Myriebe
- 20555 Jennings
- 20556 Midgekimble
- 20557 Davidkulka
- 20558 Natashaalmeida
- 20559 Sheridanlamp
- 20560 Nežič
- 20561 Noyelles
- 20562 Oldag
- 20563 Oliverprice
- 20564 Michaellane
- 20565 Oliviermousis
- 20566 Laurielee
- 20567 McQuarrie
- 20568 Migaki
- 20569 Óscarrodríguez
- 20570 Molchan
- 20571 Tiamorrison
- 20572 Celemorrow
- 20573 Garynadler
- 20574 Ochinero
- 20575 Panicucci
- 20576 Marieoertle
- 20577 Paolomartino
- 20578 Parisot
- 20579 Pavelzigo
- 20580 Marilpeters
- 20581 Prendergast
- 20582 Reichenbach
- 20583 Richthammer
- 20584 Brigidsavage
- 20585 Wentworth
- 20586 Elizkolod
- 20587 Jargoldman
- 20588 Pavolmatlovič
- 20589 Hennyadmoni
- 20590 Bongiovanni
- 20591 Sameergupta
- 20592 Payne
- 20593 Freilich
- 20594 Pemartin
- 20595 Ryanwisnoski
- 20596 Pfalzner
- 20597 Pickersgill
- 20598 Pilat-Lohinger
- 20599 Pisarčíková
- 20600 Danieltse
- 20601 Qasimafghan
- 20602 Qichengzhang
- 20603 Rafaelribeiro
- 20604 Vrishikpatil
- 20605 Rambaux
- 20606 Widemann
- 20607 Vernazza
- 20608 Fredmerlin
- 20610 Franciswilliams
- 20613 Chibaken
- 20614 Renner
- 20616 Zeeshansayed
- 20617 Richardgreenwood
- 20618 Daniebutler
- 20623 Davidyoung
- 20624 Dariozanetti
- 20625 Noto
- 20626 Rider-Stokes
- 20629 Robert
- 20631 Stefuller
- 20632 Carlyrosser
- 20633 Robertluther
- 20634 Marichardson
- 20635 Robinandrews
- 20636 Romanhirsch
- 20637 Rosemarydorsey
- 20638 Lingchen
- 20639 Michellouie
- 20641 Yenuanchen
- 20642 Laurajohnson
- 20643 Angelicaliu
- 20644 Amritdas
- 20645 Ryderstrauss
- 20646 Nikhilgupta
- 20647 Ryujiokazaki
- 20638 Ryukihyodo
- 20649 Miklenov
- 20650 Saillenfest
- 20654 Ivaneder
- 20656 Samuelgrant
- 20657 Alvarez-Candal
- 20658 Bushmarinov
- 20664 Senec
- 20673 Janelle
- 20685 Sánchez-Cano
- 20686 Thottumkara
- 20687 Saletore
- 20688 Sandroricardo
- 20689 Zhuyuanchen
- 20690 Crivello
- 20693 Ramondiaz
- 20695 Santiagoiglesias
- 20696 Torresduarte
- 20700 Saraheanderson
- 20701 Sébastiencharnoz
- 20711 Seijisugita
- 20712 Shashiganesh
- 20713 Sheward
- 20715 Shijianchun
- 20717 Shogotachibana
- 20718 Šilha
- 20719 Velasco
- 20722 Aaronclevenson
- 20723 Siltala
- 20725 Juliuscsotonyi
- 20729 Opheltius
- 20730 Jorgecarvano
- 20731 Mothédiniz
- 20732 Snedeker
- 20733 Sophiejacquinod
- 20734 Sriramsaran
- 20735 Stetzler
- 20736 Sultana
- 20737 Sungkicho
- 20740 Sémery
- 20741 Jeanmichelreess
- 20743 Sunhojin
- 20744 Susannewampfler
- 20745 Sylvainlodiot
- 20746 Tadashi
- 20747 Tanialepivert
- 20748 Thamirissantana
- 20749 Tiscareno
- 20750 Tomášpaulech
- 20751 Tomnordheim
- 20752 Topputo
- 20754 Urbaník
- 20755 Valériegodard
- 20757 Veerlesterken
- 20758 Veras
- 20759 Vienne
- 20760 Chanmatchun
- 20762 Wargnier
- 20764 Witasse
- 20765 Yifeijiao
- 20766 Yoonsoobach
- 20767 Younkiljung
- 20768 Langberg
- 20769 Yücelkılıç
- 20770 Yumoto
- 20771 Yurimoto
- 20772 Brittajones
- 20773 Aneeshvenkat
- 20774 Zender
- 20775 Zhaohaibin
- 20776 Juliekrugler
- 20777 Zhouwenhan
- 20778 Wangchaohao
- 20779 Xiajunchao
- 20780 Chanyikhei
- 20781 Znášik
- 20782 Markcroce
- 20783 Zurigray
- 20784 Trevorpowers
- 20785 Mitalithakor
- 20786 San Sebastián
- 20787 Mitchfourman
- 20788 Le Montagner
- 20789 Hughgrant
- 20791 de Kleer
- 20792 De Cicco
- 20793 Goldinaaron
- 20794 Ryanolson
- 20796 Philipmunoz
- 20798 Verlinden
- 20799 Ashishbakshi
- 20804 Etter
- 20809 Eshinjolly
- 20812 Shannonbabb
- 20813 Aakashshah
- 20814 Laurajones
- 20817 Liuxiaofeng
- 20818 Karmadiraju
- 20821 Balasridhar
- 20822 Lintingnien
- 20823 Liutingchun
- 20828 Linchen
- 20830 Luyajia
- 20831 Zhangyi
- 20832 Santhikodali
- 20834 Allihewlett
- 20835 Eliseadcock
- 20836 Marilytedja
- 20837 Ramanlal
- 20839 Bretharrison
- 20840 Borishanin
- 20843 Kuotzuhao
- 20846 Liyulin
- 20850 Gaglani
- 20851 Ramachandran
- 20852 Allilandstrom
- 20853 Yunxiangchu
- 20854 Tetruashvily
- 20855 Arifawan
- 20856 Hamzabari
- 20857 Richardromeo
- 20858 Cuirongfeng
- 20861 Lesliebeh
- 20862 Jenngoedhart
- 20863 Jamescronk
- 20870 Kaningher
- 20873 Evanfrank
- 20874 MacGregor
- 20878 Uwetreske
- 20879 Chengyuhsuan
- 20880 Yiyideng
- 20882 Paulsánchez
- 20883 Gervais
- 20887 Ngwaikin
- 20888 Siyueguo
- 20892 MacChnoic
- 20893 Rosymccloskey
- 20894 Krumeich
- 20896 Tiphene
- 20897 Deborahdomingue
- 20898 Fountainhills
- 20901 Mattmuehler
- 20902 Kylebeighle
- 20936 Nemrut Dagi
- 20947 Polyneikes
- 20952 Tydeus
- 20960 Weratschnig
- 20961 Arkesilaos
- 20962 Michizane
- 20963 Pisarenko
- 20964 Mons Naklethi
- 20965 Kutafin
- 20969 Samo
- 20990 Maryannehervey
- 20991 Jánkollár
- 20992 Marypearse
- 20993 Virginiediscry
- 20994 Atreya
- 20996 Pandrosion
- 20998 Houzeaudelehaie
- 21000 L'Encyclopédie
- 21001 Trogrlic
- 21004 Thérèsemarjou
- 21007 Lo Campo
- 21008 Ottewell
- 21009 Agilkia
- 21010 Kishon
- 21011 Johannaterlinden
- 21014 Daishi
- 21015 Shigenari
- 21016 Miyazawaseiroku
- 21022 Ike
- 21029 Adorno
- 21033 Akahirakiyozo
- 21035 Iwabu
- 21036 Nakamurayoshi
- 21038 Bazzano
- 21039 Zank
- 21040 Güntherreitz
- 21041 Wangjinsong
- 21042 Sibeck
- 21043 Pascalwillis
- 21044 Rummel
- 21045 Juangabriel
- 21047 Hodierna
- 21050 Beck
- 21054 Ojmjakon
- 21057 Garikisraelian
- 21059 Penderecki
- 21062 Iasky
- 21064 Yangliwei
- 21065 Jamesmelka
- 21073 Darksky
- 21074 Rügen
- 21075 Heussinger
- 21076 Kokoschka
- 21082 Araimasaru
- 21087 Petsimpallas
- 21088 Chelyabinsk
- 21089 Mochizuki
- 21104 Sveshnikov
- 21109 Sünkel
- 21110 Karlvalentin
- 21114 Bernson
- 21117 Tashimaseizo
- 21118 Hezimmermann
- 21120 Naritaatsushi
- 21121 Andoshoeki
- 21125 Orff
- 21126 Katsuyoshi
- 21128 Chapuis
- 21148 Billramsey
- 21149 Kenmitchell
- 21156 Didierlockwood
- 21160 Saveriolombardi
- 21161 Yamashitaharuo
- 21166 Nobuyukishouji
- 21182 Teshiogawa
- 21187 Setsuo
- 21188 Kiyohiro
- 21189 Robertonesci
- 21190 Martamaffei
- 21192 Seccisergio
- 21219 Mascagni
- 21229 Sušil
- 21234 Nakashima
- 21236 Moneta
- 21237 Suematsu
- 21238 Panarea
- 21250 Kamikouchi
- 21254 Jonan
- 21256 Robertobattiston
- 21257 Jižní Čechy
- 21258 Huckins
- 21262 Kanba
- 21269 Bechini
- 21270 Otokar
- 21272 Suyi
- 21275 Tosiyasu
- 21276 Feller
- 21282 Shimizuyuka
- 21284 Pandion
- 21287 Santa-Lucia
- 21289 Giacomel
- 21290 Vydra
- 21291 Mercalli
- 21292 Kanetakoichi
- 21293 Fujimototoyoshi
- 21294 Yamaguchiyuko
- 21301 Zanin
- 21302 Shirakamisanchi
- 21306 Marani
- 21311 Servius
- 21313 Xiuyanyu
- 21326 Nitta-machi
- 21327 Yabuzuka
- 21328 Otashi
- 21330 Alanwhitman
- 21331 Lodovicoferrari
- 21336 Andyblanchard
- 21337 Sansepolcro
- 21346 Marieladislav
- 21348 Toyoteru
- 21349 Bevoke
- 21350 Billgardner
- 21351 Bhagwat
- 21355 Pikovskaya
- 21356 Karlplank
- 21357 Davidying
- 21358 Mijerbarany
- 21359 Geng
- 21360 Bobduff
- 21361 Carsonmark
- 21362 Dickarmstrong
- 21363 Jotwani
- 21364 Lingpan
- 21367 Edwardpleva
- 21368 Shiodayama
- 21369 Gertfinger
- 21375 Fanshawe
- 21380 Devanssay
- 21387 Wafakhalil
- 21388 Moyanodeburt
- 21389 Pshenichka
- 21390 Shindo
- 21391 Rotanner
- 21392 Helibrochier
- 21393 Kalygeringer
- 21394 Justinbecker
- 21395 Albertofilho
- 21396 Fisher-Ives
- 21397 Leontovich
- 21398 Zengguoshou
- 21399 Bateman
- 21400 Ahdout
- 21401 Justinkovac
- 21402 Shanhuang
- 21403 Haken
- 21404 Atluri
- 21405 Sagarmehta
- 21406 Jimyang
- 21407 Jessicabaker
- 21408 Lyrahaas
- 21409 Forbes
- 21410 Cahill
- 21411 Abifraeman
- 21412 Sinchanban
- 21413 Albertsao
- 21414 Blumenthal
- 21415 Nicobrenner
- 21416 Sisichen
- 21417 Kelleyharris
- 21418 Bustos
- 21419 Devience
- 21420 Steinicke
- 21421 Nealwadhwa
- 21422 Alexacarey
- 21423 Credo
- 21424 Faithchang
- 21425 Cordwell
- 21426 Davidbauer
- 21427 Ryanharrison
- 21428 Junehokim
- 21429 Gulati
- 21430 Brubrew
- 21431 Amberhess
- 21432 Polingloh
- 21433 Stekramer
- 21434 Stanchiang
- 21435 Aharon
- 21436 Chaoyichi
- 21437 Georgechen
- 21438 Camibarnett
- 21439 Robenzing
- 21440 Elizacollins
- 21441 Stevencondie
- 21445 Pegconnolly
- 21446 Tedflint
- 21447 Yungchieh
- 21448 Galindo
- 21449 Hemmick
- 21450 Kissel
- 21451 Fisher
- 21453 Victorlevine
- 21454 Chernoby
- 21455 Mcfarland
- 21456 Myers
- 21457 Fevig
- 21458 Susank
- 21459 Chrisrussell
- 21460 Ryozo
- 21461 Alexchernyak
- 21462 Karenedbal
- 21463 Nickerson
- 21464 Chinaroonchai
- 21465 Michelepatt
- 21466 Franpelrine
- 21467 Rosenstein
- 21468 Saylor
- 21469 Robschum
- 21470 Frankchuang
- 21471 Pavelchvykov
- 21472 Stimson
- 21473 Petesullivan
- 21474 Pamelatsai
- 21475 Jasonclain
- 21476 Petrie
- 21477 Terikdaly
- 21478 Maggiedelano
- 21479 Marymartha
- 21480 Jilltucker
- 21481 Johnwarren
- 21482 Patashnick
- 21483 Abdulrasool
- 21484 Eppard
- 21485 Ash
- 21488 Danyellelee
- 21495 Feaga
- 21496 Lijianyang
- 21497 Alicehine
- 21498 Keenanferar
- 21499 Perillat
- 21500 Vazquez
- 21501 Acevedo
- 21502 Cruz
- 21503 Beksha
- 21504 Caseyfreeman
- 21505 Bernert
- 21506 Betsill
- 21507 Bhasin
- 21508 Benbrewer
- 21509 Lucascavin
- 21510 Chemnitz
- 21511 Chiardola
- 21512 Susieclary
- 21513 Bethcochran
- 21514 Gamalski
- 21515 Gavini
- 21516 Mariagodinez
- 21517 Dobi
- 21518 Maysunhasan
- 21519 Josephhenry
- 21520 Dianaeheart
- 21521 Hippalgaonkar
- 21522 Entwisle
- 21523 GONG
- 21526 Mirano
- 21527 Horton
- 21528 Chrisfaust
- 21529 Johnjames
- 21530 Despiau
- 21531 Billcollin
- 21537 Fréchet
- 21539 Josefhlávka
- 21540 Itthipanyanan
- 21541 Friskop
- 21542 Kennajeannet
- 21543 Jessop
- 21544 Hermainkhan
- 21545 Koirala
- 21546 Konermann
- 21547 Kottapalli
- 21548 Briekugler
- 21549 Carolinelang
- 21550 Laviolette
- 21551 Geyang
- 21552 Richardlee
- 21553 Monchicourt
- 21554 Leechaohsi
- 21555 Levary
- 21556 Christineli
- 21557 Daniellitt
- 21558 Alisonliu
- 21559 Jingyuanluo
- 21560 Analyons
- 21561 Masterman
- 21562 Chrismessick
- 21563 Chetgervais
- 21564 Widmanstätten
- 21568 Evanmorikawa
- 21570 Muralidhar
- 21571 Naegeli
- 21572 Nguyen-McCarty
- 21574 Ouzan
- 21575 Padmanabhan
- 21576 McGivney
- 21577 Negron
- 21578 Davidgillette
- 21580 Portalatin
- 21581 Ernestoruiz
- 21582 Arunvenkataraman
- 21583 Caropietsch
- 21584 Polepeddi
- 21585 Polmear
- 21586 Pourkaviani
- 21587 Christopynn
- 21588 Gianelli
- 21589 Rafes
- 21601 Aias
- 21602 Ialmenus
- 21605 Reynoso
- 21607 Robel
- 21608 Gloyna
- 21609 Williamcaleb
- 21610 Rosengard
- 21611 Rosoff
- 21612 Chelsagloria
- 21613 Schlecht
- 21614 Grochowski
- 21615 Guardamano
- 21616 Guhagilford
- 21617 Johnhagen
- 21618 Sheikh
- 21619 Johnshopkins
- 21621 Sherman
- 21622 Victorshia
- 21623 Albertshieh
- 21625 Seira
- 21626 Matthewhall
- 21627 Sillis
- 21628 Lucashof
- 21629 Siperstein
- 21630 Wootensmith
- 21631 Stephenhonan
- 21632 Suwanasri
- 21633 Hsingpenyuan
- 21634 Huangweikang
- 21635 Micahtoll
- 21636 Huertas
- 21637 Ninahuffman
- 21638 Nicjachowski
- 21639 Davidkaufman
- 21640 Petekirkland
- 21641 Tiffanyko
- 21642 Kominers
- 21643 Kornev
- 21644 Vinay
- 21645 Chentsaiwei
- 21646 Joshuaturner
- 21647 Carlturner
- 21648 Gravanschaik
- 21649 Vardhana
- 21650 Tilgner
- 21651 Mission Valley
- 21652 Vasishtha
- 21653 Davidwang
- 21654 Telmo
- 21655 Niklauswirth
- 21656 Knuth
- 21657 Alinecarter
- 21659 Fredholm
- 21660 Velenia
- 21661 Olgagermani
- 21662 Benigni
- 21663 Banat
- 21664 Konradzuse
- 21665 Frege
- 21670 Kuan
- 21671 Warrener
- 21672 Laichunju
- 21673 Leatherman
- 21674 Renaldowebb
- 21675 Kaitlinmaria
- 21676 Maureenanne
- 21677 Tylerlyon
- 21678 Lindner
- 21679 Bettypalermiti
- 21680 Richardschwartz
- 21682 Peštafrantišek
- 21683 Segal
- 21684 Alinafiocca
- 21685 Francomallia
- 21686 Koschny
- 21687 Filopanti
- 21694 Allisowilson
- 21695 Hannahwolf
- 21696 Ermalmquist
- 21697 Mascharak
- 21698 McCarron
- 21699 Wolpert
- 21700 Caseynicole
- 21701 Gabemendoza
- 21702 Prisymendoza
- 21703 Shravanimikk
- 21704 Mikkilineni
- 21705 Subinmin
- 21706 Robminehart
- 21707 Johnmoore
- 21708 Mulhall
- 21709 Sethmurray
- 21710 Nijhawan
- 21711 Wilfredwong
- 21712 Obaid
- 21713 Michaelolson
- 21714 Geoffreywoo
- 21715 Palaniappan
- 21716 Panchamia
- 21717 Pang
- 21718 Cheonghapark
- 21719 Pasricha
- 21720 Pilishvili
- 21721 Feiniqu
- 21722 Rambhia
- 21723 Yinyinwu
- 21724 Ratai
- 21725 Zhongyuechen
- 21726 Rezvanian
- 21727 Rhines
- 21728 Zhuzhirui
- 21729 Kimrichards
- 21730 Ignaciorod
- 21731 Zhuruochen
- 21732 Rumery
- 21733 Schlottmann
- 21735 Nissaschmidt
- 21736 Samaschneid
- 21737 Stephenshulz
- 21738 Schwank
- 21739 Annekeschwob
- 21742 Rachaelscott
- 21743 Michaelsegal
- 21744 Meliselinger
- 21745 Shadfan
- 21746 Carrieshaw
- 21747 Justsolomon
- 21748 Srinivasan
- 21750 Tartakahashi
- 21751 Jennytaylor
- 21752 Johnthurmon
- 21753 Trudel
- 21754 Tvaruzkova
- 21758 Adrianveres
- 21770 Wangyiran
- 21774 O'Brien
- 21775 Tsiganis
- 21776 Kryszczyńska
- 21778 Andrewarren
- 21782 Davemcdonald
- 21785 Méchain
- 21789 Frankwasser
- 21791 Mattweegman
- 21795 Masi
- 21798 Mitchweegman
- 21799 Ciociaria
- 21801 Ančerl
- 21802 Svoreň
- 21804 Václavneumann
- 21811 Burroughs
- 21813 Danwinegar
- 21814 Shanawolff
- 21815 Fanyang
- 21817 Yingling
- 21818 Yurkanin
- 21821 Billryan
- 21822 Degiorgi
- 21825 Zhangyizhong
- 21826 Youjiazhong
- 21827 Chingzhu
- 21829 Kaylacornale
- 21840 Ghoshchoudhury
- 21846 Wojakowski
- 21850 Abshir
- 21852 Bolander
- 21853 Kelseykay
- 21854 Brendandwyer
- 21856 Heathermaria
- 21858 Gosal
- 21860 Joannaguy
- 21861 Maryhedberg
- 21862 Joshuajones
- 21873 Jindřichůvhradec
- 21887 Dipippo
- 21888 Ďurech
- 21891 Andreabocelli
- 21900 Orus
- 21903 Wallace
- 21913 Taylorjones
- 21914 Melakabinoff
- 21915 Lavins
- 21919 Luga
- 21921 Camdenmiller
- 21922 Mocz
- 21924 Alyssaovaitt
- 21925 Supasternak
- 21926 Jacobperry
- 21927 Sarahpierz
- 21928 Prabakaran
- 21929 Nileshraval
- 21932 Rios
- 21933 Aaronrozon
- 21936 Ryan
- 21937 Basheehan
- 21939 Kasmith
- 21942 Subramanian
- 21943 Diannacowern
- 21945 Kleshchonok
- 21949 Tatulian
- 21952 Terry
- 21956 Thangada
- 21958 Tripuraneni
- 21962 Scottsandford
- 21964 Kevinhousen
- 21965 Dones
- 21966 Hamadori
- 21970 Tyle
- 21985 Šejna
- 21986 Alexanduribe
- 21989 Werntz
- 21990 Garretyazzie
- 21991 Zane
- 21999 Disora
- 22001 Philharrington
- 22002 Richardregan
- 22003 Startek
- 22005 Willnelson
- 22010 Kuzmina
- 22019 Leviticusalewis
- 22020 Joshuahandal
- 22021 Andreariley
- 22022 Gould
- 22025 Dorisdaou
- 22026 Lindabillings
- 22027 Romanakofler
- 22028 Matthewdaniels
- 22029 Johnshaw
- 22032 Mikekoop
- 22038 Margarshain
- 22057 Brianking
- 22063 Dansealey
- 22064 Angelalewis
- 22065 Colgrove
- 22079 Kabinoff
- 22080 Emilevasseur
- 22082 Rountree
- 22102 Karenlamb
- 22105 Pirko
- 22106 Tomokoarai
- 22109 Loriehutch
- 22112 Staceyraw
- 22120 Gaylefarrar
- 22132 Merkley
- 22134 Kirian
- 22136 Jamesharrison
- 22137 Annettelee
- 22138 Laynrichards
- 22139 Jamescox
- 22140 Suzyamamoto
- 22142 Loripryor
- 22143 Cathyfowler
- 22144 Linmichaels
- 22146 Samaan
- 22148 Francislee
- 22149 Cinyras
- 22151 Davebracy
- 22152 Robbennett
- 22153 Kathbarnhart
- 22155 Marchetti
- 22156 Richoffman
- 22157 Bryanhoran
- 22158 Chee
- 22161 Santagata
- 22162 Leslijohnson
- 22165 Kathydouglas
- 22167 Lane-Cline
- 22168 Weissflog
- 22171 Choi
- 22173 Myersdavis
- 22174 Allisonmae
- 22177 Saotome
- 22180 Paeon
- 22183 Canonlau
- 22184 Rudolfveltman
- 22185 Štiavnica
- 22189 Gijskatgert
- 22190 Stellakwee
- 22191 Achúcarro
- 22192 Vivienreuter
- 22195 Nevadodelruiz
- 22199 Klonios
- 22203 Prothoenor
- 22222 Hodios
- 22227 Polyxenos
- 22249 Dvorets Pionerov
- 22250 Konstfrolov
- 22251 Eden
- 22253 Sivers
- 22254 Vladbarmin
- 22260 Ur
- 22263 Pignedoli
- 22275 Barentsen
- 22276 Belkin
- 22277 Hirado
- 22278 Protitch
- 22280 Mandragora
- 22281 Popescu
- 22282 Dreyer
- 22283 Pytheas
- 22291 Heitifer
- 22292 Mosul
- 22294 Simmons
- 22299 Georgesteiner
- 22312 Kelly
- 22322 Bodensee
- 22338 Janemojo
- 22341 Francispoulenc
- 22346 Katsumatatakashi
- 22347 Mishinatakashi
- 22348 Schmeidler
- 22351 Yamashitatoshiki
- 22352 Fujiwarakenjiro
- 22354 Sposetti
- 22355 Yahabananshozan
- 22356 Feyerabend
- 22366 Flettner
- 22369 Klinger
- 22370 Italocalvino
- 22378 Gaherty
- 22379 Montale
- 22383 Nikolauspacassi
- 22385 Fujimoriboshi
- 22394 Kondouakira
- 22395 Ourakenji
- 22397 Minobe
- 22401 Egisto
- 22402 Goshi
- 22403 Manjitludher
- 22404 Skujytė
- 22405 Gavioliremo
- 22406 Garyboyle
- 22409 Nagatohideaki
- 22410 Grinspoon
- 22413 Haifu
- 22414 Hornschemeier
- 22415 Humeivey
- 22416 Tanimotoyoshi
- 22420 Xinanlida
- 22421 Jamesedgar
- 22422 Kenmount Hill
- 22423 Kudlacek
- 22426 Mikehanes
- 22429 Jurašek
- 22432 Pamgriffin
- 22434 Peredery
- 22435 Pierfederici
- 22440 Bangsgaard
- 22442 Blaha
- 22446 Philwhitney
- 22448 Ricksaunders
- 22449 Ottijeff
- 22450 Nové Hrady
- 22451 Tymothycoons
- 22453 Shibusawaeiichi
- 22454 Rosalylopes
- 22456 Salopek
- 22465 Karelanděl
- 22467 Koharumi
- 22469 Poloniny
- 22470 Shirakawa-go
- 22473 Stanleyhey
- 22474 Frobenius
- 22475 Stanrunge
- 22477 Julimacoraor
- 22480 Maedatoshihisa
- 22481 Zachlynn
- 22482 Michbertier
- 22485 Unterman
- 22487 Megphillips
- 22488 Martyschwartz
- 22489 Yanaka
- 22490 Zigamiyama
- 22492 Mosig
- 22494 Trillium
- 22495 Fubini
- 22497 Immanuelfuchs
- 22498 Willman
- 22499 Wunibaldkamm
- 22500 Grazianoventre
- 22503 Thalpius
- 22505 Lewit
- 22512 Cannat
- 22517 Alexzanardi
- 22519 Gerardklein
- 22521 ZZ Top
- 22526 Gonzálezsuárez
- 22527 Gawlik
- 22528 Elysehope
- 22530 Huynh-Le
- 22531 Davidkelley
- 22533 Krishnan
- 22534 Lieblich
- 22536 Katelowry
- 22537 Meyerowitz
- 22538 Lucasmoller
- 22540 Mork
- 22542 Pendri
- 22543 Ranjan
- 22544 Sarahrapo
- 22545 Brittrusso
- 22546 Schickler
- 22547 Kimberscott
- 22550 Jonsellon
- 22551 Adamsolomon
- 22553 Yisun
- 22554 Shoshanatell
- 22555 Joevellone
- 22558 Mladen
- 22561 Miviscardi
- 22562 Wage
- 22563 Xinwang
- 22564 Jeffreyxing
- 22566 Irazaitseva
- 22567 Zenisek
- 22570 Harleyzhang
- 22571 Letianzhang
- 22572 Yuanzhang
- 22573 Johnzhou
- 22575 Jayallen
- 22577 Alfiuccio
- 22579 Marcyeager
- 22580 Kenkaplan
- 22581 Rosahemphill
- 22582 Patmiller
- 22583 Metzler
- 22584 Winigleason
- 22586 Shellyhynes
- 22587 McKennon
- 22589 Minor
- 22594 Stoops
- 22596 Kathwallace
- 22597 Lynzielinski
- 22598 Francespearl
- 22599 Heatherhall
- 22603 Davidoconnor
- 22605 Steverumsey
- 22611 Galerkin
- 22612 Dandibner
- 22613 Callander
- 22616 Bogolyubov
- 22617 Vidphananu
- 22618 Silva Nortica
- 22619 Ajscheetz
- 22621 Larrybartel
- 22622 Strong
- 22623 Fisico
- 22625 Kanipe
- 22626 Jengordinier
- 22627 Aviscardi
- 22628 Michaelallen
- 22630 Wallmuth
- 22631 Dillard
- 22632 DiNovis
- 22633 Fazio
- 22638 Abdulla
- 22639 Nickanthony
- 22640 Shalilabaena
- 22644 Matejbel
- 22645 Rotblat
- 22647 Lévi-Strauss
- 22649 Paulineloader
- 22650 Brianloader
- 22656 Aaronburrows
- 22666 Josephchurch
- 22675 Davidcohn
- 22679 Amydavid
- 22685 Dominguez
- 22686 Mishchenko
- 22692 Carfrekahl
- 22694 Tyndall
- 22697 Mánek
- 22701 Cyannaskye
- 22705 Erinedwards
- 22706 Ganguly
- 22707 Jackgrundy
- 22717 Romeuf
- 22719 Nakadori
- 22722 Timothycooper
- 22723 Edlopez
- 22724 Byatt
- 22725 Drabble
- 22729 Anthennig
- 22730 Jacobhurwitz
- 22732 Jakpor
- 22734 Theojones
- 22736 Kamitaki
- 22739 Sikhote-Alin
- 22740 Rayleigh
- 22744 Esterantonucci
- 22745 Rikuzentakata
- 22752 Sabrinamasiero
- 22754 Olympus
- 22756 Manpreetkaur
- 22757 Klimcak
- 22758 Lemp
- 22769 Aurelianora
- 22775 Jasonelloyd
- 22776 Matossian
- 22777 McAliley
- 22780 McAlpine
- 22782 Kushalnaik
- 22783 Teng
- 22784 Theresaoei
- 22786 Willipete
- 22788 von Steuben
- 22791 Twarog
- 22794 Lindsayleona
- 22802 Sigiriya
- 22809 Kensiequade
- 22810 Rawat
- 22812 Ricker
- 22815 Sewell
- 22817 Shankar
- 22819 Davidtao
- 22824 von Neumann
- 22827 Arvernia
- 22828 Jaynethomp
- 22829 Paigerin
- 22830 Tinker
- 22831 Trevanvoorth
- 22833 Scottyu
- 22835 Rickgardner
- 22836 Leeannragasa
- 22837 Richardcruz
- 22838 Darcyhampton
- 22839 Richlawrence
- 22840 Villarreal
- 22842 Alenashort
- 22843 Stverak
- 22846 Fredwhitaker
- 22847 Utley
- 22848 Chrisharriot
- 22852 Kinney
- 22855 Donnajones
- 22856 Stevenzeiher
- 22857 Hyde
- 22858 Suesong
- 22860 Francylemp
- 22862 Janinedavis
- 22863 Namarkarian
- 22865 Amymoffett
- 22868 Karst
- 22869 Brianmcfar
- 22870 Rosing
- 22871 Ellenoei
- 22872 Williamweber
- 22873 Heatherholt
- 22874 Haydeephelps
- 22875 Lanejackson
- 22877 Reginamiller
- 22880 Pulaski
- 22885 Sakaemura
- 22889 Donnablaney
- 22890 Ruthaellis
- 22898 Falce
- 22899 Alconrad
- 22900 Trudie
- 22901 Ivanbella
- 22903 Georgeclooney
- 22905 Liciniotoso
- 22906 Lisauckis
- 22907 van Voorthuijsen
- 22908 Bayefsky-Anand
- 22909 Gongmyunglee
- 22910 Ruiwang
- 22911 Johnpardon
- 22912 Noraxu
- 22913 Brockman
- 22914 Tsunanmachi
- 22919 Shuwan
- 22920 Kaitduncan
- 22921 Siyuanliu
- 22922 Sophiecai
- 22923 Kathrynblair
- 22924 Deshpande
- 22927 Blewett
- 22928 Templehe
- 22929 Seanwahl
- 22932 Orenbrecher
- 22933 Mareverett
- 22936 Ricmccutchen
- 22937 Nataliavella
- 22938 Brilawrence
- 22939 Handlin
- 22940 Chyan
- 22942 Alexacourtis
- 22944 Sarahmarzen
- 22945 Schikowski
- 22947 Carolsuh
- 22948 Maidanak
- 22951 Okabekazuko
- 22952 Hommasachi
- 22955 Tibees
- 22957 Vaintrob
- 22958 Rohatgi
- 22961 Rosegarcia
- 22963 Fuls
- 22978 Nyrola
- 22981 Katz
- 22982 Emmacall
- 22983 Schlingheyde
- 22987 Rebeckaufman
- 22988 Jimmyhom
- 22989 Loriskopp
- 22990 Mattbrenner
- 22991 Jeffreyklus
- 22992 Susansmith
- 22993 Aferrari
- 22994 Workman
- 22995 Allenjanes
- 22996 De Boo
- 22998 Waltimyer
- 22999 Irizarry
- 23002 Jillhirsch
- 23003 Ziminski
- 23004 Triciatalbert
- 23006 Pazden
- 23008 Rebeccajohns
- 23010 Kathyfinch
- 23011 Petach
- 23013 Carolsmyth
- 23014 Walstein
- 23016 Michaelroche
- 23017 Advincula
- 23018 Annmoriarty
- 23019 Thomgregory
- 23030 Jimkennedy
- 23032 Fossey
- 23038 Jeffbaughman
- 23040 Latham
- 23041 Hunt
- 23042 Craigpeters
- 23044 Starodub
- 23045 Sarahocken
- 23046 Stevengordon
- 23047 Isseroff
- 23048 Davidnelson
- 23054 Thomaslynch
- 23055 Barbjewett
- 23057 Angelawilson
- 23059 Paulpaino
- 23060 Shepherd
- 23061 Blueglass
- 23062 Donnamooney
- 23063 Lichtman
- 23064 Mattmiller
- 23066 Yihedong
- 23067 Ishajain
- 23068 Tyagi
- 23069 Kapps
- 23070 Koussa
- 23071 Tinaliu
- 23074 Sarakirsch
- 23079 Munguia
- 23091 Stansill
- 23096 Mihika
- 23098 Huanghuang
- 23102 Dayanli
- 23109 Masayanagisawa
- 23110 Ericberne
- 23111 Fritzperls
- 23113 Aaronhakim
- 23115 Valcourt
- 23116 Streich
- 23120 Paulallen
- 23121 Michaelding
- 23122 Lorgat
- 23128 Dorminy
- 23131 Debenedictis
- 23133 Rishinbehl
- 23135 Pheidas
- 23151 Georgehotz
- 23153 Andrewnowell
- 23155 Judithblack
- 23158 Bouligny
- 23162 Alexcrook
- 23164 Badger
- 23165 Kakinchan
- 23166 Bilal
- 23168 Lauriefletch
- 23169 Michikami
- 23172 Williamartin
- 23173 Hideaki
- 23176 Missacarvell
- 23178 Ghaben
- 23179 Niedermeyer
- 23180 Ryosuke
- 23182 Siyaxuza
- 23186 Knauss
- 23190 Klages-Mundt
- 23191 Sujaytyle
- 23192 Caysvesterby
- 23197 Danielcook
- 23198 Norvell
- 23199 Bezdek
- 23204 Arditkroni
- 23212 Arkajitdey
- 23213 Ameliachang
- 23214 Patrickchen
- 23216 Mikehagler
- 23217 Nayana
- 23218 Puttachi
- 23220 Yalemichaels
- 23221 Delgado
- 23228 Nandinisarma
- 23232 Buschur
- 23234 Lilliantsai
- 23235 Yingfan
- 23238 Ocasio-Cortez
- 23241 Yada
- 23244 Lafayette
- 23245 Fujimura
- 23246 Terazono
- 23248 Batchelor
- 23249 Liaoyenting
- 23254 Chikatoshi
- 23257 Denny
- 23258 Tsuihark
- 23259 Miwadagakuen
- 23262 Thiagoolson
- 23265 von Wurden
- 23270 Kellerman
- 23271 Kellychacon
- 23274 Wuminchun
- 23277 Benhughes
- 23279 Chenhungjen
- 23280 Laitsaita
- 23281 Vijayjain
- 23283 Jinjuyi
- 23284 Celik
- 23286 Parlakgul
- 23289 Naruhirata
- 23294 Sunao
- 23295 Brandoreavis
- 23296 Brianreavis
- 23298 Loewenstein
- 23306 Adamfields
- 23307 Alexramek
- 23308 Niyomsatian
- 23310 Siriwon
- 23313 Supokaivanich
- 23315 Navinbrian
- 23318 Salvadorsanchez
- 23322 Duyingsewa
- 23323 Anand
- 23324 Kwak
- 23325 Arroyo
- 23327 Luchernandez
- 23329 Josevega
- 23331 Halimzeidan
- 23355 Elephenor
- 23382 Epistrophos
- 23383 Schedios
- 23401 Brodskaya
- 23402 Turchina
- 23403 Boudewijnbüch
- 23404 Bomans
- 23405 Nisyros
- 23406 Kozlov
- 23408 Beijingaoyun
- 23409 Derzhavin
- 23410 Vikuznetsov
- 23411 Bayanova
- 23418 Malmbäck
- 23436 Alekfursenko
- 23437 Šíma
- 23443 Kikwaya
- 23444 Kukučín
- 23448 Yasudatakeshi
- 23450 Birkenstock
- 23452 Drew
- 23455 Fumi
- 23457 Beiderbecke
- 23465 Yamashitakouhei
- 23468 Kannabe
- 23469 Neilpeart
- 23471 Kawatamasaaki
- 23472 Rolfriekher
- 23473 Voss
- 23475 Nakazawa
- 23477 Wallenstadt
- 23478 Chikumagawa
- 23490 Monikohl
- 23495 Nagaotoshiko
- 23504 Haneda
- 23514 Schneider
- 23520 Ludwigbechstein
- 23524 Yuichitsuda
- 23543 Saiki
- 23547 Tognelli
- 23549 Epicles
- 23562 Hyodokenichi
- 23564 Ungaretti
- 23571 Zuaboni
- 23578 Baedeker
- 23583 Křivský
- 23587 Abukumado
- 23589 Silvmellini
- 23591 Yanagisawa
- 23608 Alpiapuane
- 23612 Ramzel
- 23617 Duna
- 23625 Gelfond
- 23628 Ichimura
- 23638 Nagano
- 23644 Yamaneko
- 23648 Kolář
- 23649 Tohoku
- 23650 Čvančara
- 23662 Jozankei
- 23663 Kalou
- 23667 Savinakim
- 23668 Eunbekim
- 23669 Huihuifan
- 23672 Swiggum
- 23673 Neilmehta
- 23674 Juliebaker
- 23675 Zabinski
- 23676 Tomitayoshihiro
- 23679 Andrewmoore
- 23680 Kerryking
- 23681 Prabhu
- 23685 Toaldo
- 23686 Songyuan
- 23688 Josephjoachim
- 23689 Jancuypers
- 23690 Jiangwenhan
- 23691 Jefneve
- 23692 Nandatianwenners
- 23699 Paulgordan
- 23700 Maríagalán
- 23701 Liqibin
- 23707 Chambliss
- 23712 Willpatrick
- 23717 Kaddoura
- 23718 Horgos
- 23722 Gulak
- 23727 Akihasan
- 23728 Jasonmorrow
- 23729 Kemeisha
- 23730 Suncar
- 23732 Choiseungjae
- 23733 Hyojiyun
- 23734 Kimgyehyun
- 23735 Cohen
- 23738 van Zyl
- 23739 Kevin
- 23741 Takaaki
- 23742 Okadatatsuaki
- 23743 Toshikasuga
- 23744 Ootsubo
- 23745 Liadawley
- 23747 Rahaelgupta
- 23748 Kaarethode
- 23749 Thygesen
- 23750 Stepciechan
- 23751 Davidprice
- 23752 Jacobshapiro
- 23753 Busdicker
- 23754 Rachnareddy
- 23755 Sergiolozano
- 23756 Daniellozano
- 23757 Jonmunoz
- 23758 Guyuzhou
- 23759 Wangzhaoxin
- 23761 Yangliqing
- 23768 Abu-Rmaileh
- 23769 Russellbabb
- 23771 Emaitchar
- 23772 Masateru
- 23773 Sarugaku
- 23774 Herbelliott
- 23775 Okudaira
- 23776 Gosset
- 23777 Goursat
- 23779 Cambier
- 23783 Alyssachan
- 23788 Cofer
- 23791 Kaysonconlin
- 23792 Alyssacook
- 23798 Samagonzalez
- 23801 Erikgustafson
- 23804 Haber
- 23808 Joshuahammer
- 23809 Haswell
- 23811 Connorivens
- 23812 Jannuzi
- 23814 Bethanylynne
- 23816 Rohitkamat
- 23817 Gokulk
- 23818 Matthewlepow
- 23819 Tsuyoshi
- 23821 Morganmonroe
- 23831 Mattmooney
- 23833 Mowers
- 23834 Mukhopadhyay
- 23837 Matthewnanni
- 23844 Raghvendra
- 23850 Ramaswami
- 23851 Rottman-Yang
- 23852 Laurierumker
- 23854 Rickschaffer
- 23855 Brandonshih
- 23858 Ambrosesoehn
- 23861 Benjaminsong
- 23865 Karlsorensen
- 23867 Cathsoto
- 23871 Ousha
- 23875 Strube
- 23877 Gourmaud
- 23879 Demura
- 23880 Tongil
- 23882 Fredcourant
- 23884 Karenharvey
- 23886 Toshihamane
- 23887 Shinsukeabe
- 23888 Daikinoshita
- 23889 Hermanngrassmann
- 23890 Quindou
- 23893 Lauman
- 23894 Arikahiguchi
- 23895 Akikonakamura
- 23896 Tatsuaki
- 23897 Daikuroda
- 23898 Takir
- 23899 Kornoš
- 23900 Urakawa
- 23904 Amytang
- 23922 Tawadros
- 23924 Premt
- 23928 Darbywoodard
- 23931 Ibuki
- 23937 Delibes
- 23938 Kurosaki
- 23944 Dusser
- 23946 Marcelleroux
- 23949 Dazapata
- 23950 Tsusakamoto
- 23955 Nishikota
- 23958 Theronice
- 23975 Akran
- 23980 Ogden
- 23981 Patjohnson
- 23988 Maungakiekie
- 23989 Farpoint
- 23990 Springsteen
- 23992 Markhobbs
- 23994 Mayhan
- 23995 Oechsle
- 23999 Rinner
- 24000 Patrickdufour
- 24005 Eddieozawa
- 24010 Stovall
- 24015 Pascalepinner
- 24019 Jeremygasper
- 24021 Yocum
- 24024 Lynnejohnson
- 24025 Kimwallin
- 24026 Pusateri
- 24027 Downs
- 24028 Veronicaduys
- 24032 Aimeemcarthy
- 24044 Caballo
- 24045 Unruh
- 24046 Malovany
- 24047 Latorredelsole
- 24048 Pedroduque
- 24051 Hadinger
- 24052 Nguyen
- 24053 Shinichiro
- 24059 Halverson
- 24060 Schimenti
- 24062 Hardister
- 24063 Nanwoodward
- 24065 Barbfriedman
- 24066 Eriksorensen
- 24068 Simonsen
- 24069 Barbarapener
- 24070 Toniwest
- 24074 Thomasjohnson
- 24084 Teresaswiger
- 24087 Ciambetti
- 24090 Grindavík
- 24093 Tomoyamaguchi
- 24101 Cassini
- 24102 Jacquescassini
- 24103 Dethury
- 24104 Vinissac
- 24105 Broughton
- 24118 Babazadeh
- 24119 Katherinrose
- 24120 Jeremyblum
- 24121 Achandran
- 24123 Timothychang
- 24124 Dozier
- 24125 Sapphozoe
- 24126 Gudjonson
- 24128 Hipsman
- 24129 Oliviahu
- 24130 Alexhuang
- 24131 Jonathuggins
- 24133 Chunkaikao
- 24134 Cliffordkim
- 24135 Lisann
- 24137 Torre del Lago
- 24138 Benjaminlu
- 24139 Brianmcarthy
- 24140 Evanmirts
- 24144 Philipmocz
- 24146 Benjamueller
- 24147 Stefanmuller
- 24148 Mychajliw
- 24149 Raghavan
- 24152 Ramasesh
- 24153 Davidalex
- 24154 Ayonsen
- 24155 Serganov
- 24156 Hamsasridhar
- 24157 Toshiyanagisawa
- 24158 Kokubo
- 24159 Shigetakahashi
- 24162 Askaci
- 24168 Hexlein
- 24173 SLAS
- 24186 Shivanisud
- 24188 Matthewage
- 24189 Lewasserman
- 24190 Xiaoyunyin
- 24191 Qiaochuyuan
- 24194 Paľuš
- 24198 Xiaomengzeng
- 24199 Tsarevsky
- 24200 Peterbrooks
- 24201 Davidkeith
- 24204 Trinkle
- 24206 Mariealoia
- 24208 Stelguerrero
- 24210 Handsberry
- 24211 Barbarawood
- 24214 Jonchristo
- 24215 Jongastel
- 24217 Paulroeder
- 24218 Linfrederick
- 24219 Chrisodom
- 24224 Matthewdavis
- 24226 Sekhsaria
- 24232 Lanthrum
- 24236 Danielberger
- 24238 Adkerson
- 24239 Paulinehiga
- 24240 Tinagal
- 24245 Ezratty
- 24249 Bobbiolson
- 24250 Luteolson
- 24259 Chriswalker
- 24260 Kriváň
- 24261 Judilegault
- 24265 Banthonytwarog
- 24268 Charconley
- 24269 Kittappa
- 24270 Dougskinner
- 24274 Alliswheeler
- 24277 Schoch
- 24278 Davidgreen
- 24280 Rohenderson
- 24289 Anthonypalma
- 24292 Susanragan
- 24296 Marychristie
- 24297 Jonbach
- 24301 Gural
- 24303 Michaelrice
- 24304 Lynnrice
- 24305 Darrellparnell
- 24308 Cowenco
- 24316 Anncooper
- 24317 Pukarhamal
- 24318 Vivianlee
- 24325 Kaleighanne
- 24328 Thomasburr
- 24331 Alyshaowen
- 24332 Shaunalinn
- 24333 Petermassey
- 24334 Conard
- 24337 Johannessen
- 24344 Brianbarnett
- 24345 Llaverias
- 24346 Lehienphan
- 24347 Arthurkuan
- 24351 Fionawood
- 24352 Kapilrama
- 24353 Patrickhsu
- 24354 Caz
- 24369 Evanichols
- 24370 Marywang
- 24372 Timobauman
- 24376 Ramesh
- 24378 Katelyngibbs
- 24380 Dorippe
- 24385 Katcagen
- 24386 McLindon
- 24387 Trettel
- 24397 Parkerowan
- 24409 Caninquinn
- 24410 Juliewalker
- 24411 Janches
- 24412 Ericpalmer
- 24413 Britneyschmidt
- 24414 Anzhenhosp
- 24420 Thasos
- 24421 Djorgovski
- 24422 Helentressa
- 24426 Belova
- 24432 Elizamcnitt
- 24434 Josephhoscheidt
- 24438 Michaeloy
- 24439 Yanney
- 24441 Jopek
- 24450 Victorchang
- 24451 Molion
- 24455 Kaňuchová
- 24464 Williamkalb
- 24474 Ananthram
- 24480 Glavin
- 24484 Chester
- 24488 Eliebochner
- 24492 Nathanmonroe
- 24493 McCommon
- 24494 Megmoulding
- 24495 Degroff
- 24503 Kero
- 24509 Joycechai
- 24517 Omattage
- 24520 Abramson
- 24523 Sanaraoof
- 24524 Kevinhawkins
- 24526 Desai
- 24529 Urbach
- 24532 Csabakiss
- 24533 Kokhirova
- 24535 Neslušan
- 24538 Charliexie
- 24541 Hangzou
- 24546 Darnell
- 24547 Stauber
- 24548 Katieeverett
- 24549 Jaredgoodman
- 24587 Kapaneus
- 24600 Riepe
- 24601 Valjean
- 24602 Mozzhorin
- 24603 Mekistheus
- 24604 Vasilermakov
- 24605 Tsykalyuk
- 24607 Sevnatu
- 24608 Alexveselkov
- 24609 Evgenij
- 24611 Svetochka
- 24618 Johnduffey
- 24619 Danielarsham
- 24626 Astrowizard
- 24637 Olʹgusha
- 24639 Mukhametdinov
- 24640 Omiwa
- 24641 Enver
- 24643 MacCready
- 24645 Šegon
- 24646 Stober
- 24647 Maksimachev
- 24648 Evpatoria
- 24649 Balaklava
- 24654 Fossett
- 24658 Misch
- 24662 Gryll
- 24663 Philae
- 24665 Tolerantia
- 24666 Miesvanrohe
- 24671 Frankmartin
- 24673 Ohsugitadao
- 24679 Van Rensbergen
- 24680 Alleven
- 24681 Granados
- 24695 Štyrský
- 24697 Rastrelli
- 24699 Schwekendiek
- 24701 Elyu-Ene
- 24709 Mitau
- 24711 Chamisso
- 24712 Boltzmann
- 24713 Ekrutt
- 24726 Nagatatetsuya
- 24728 Scagell
- 24732 Leonardcohen
- 24734 Kareness
- 24748 Nernst
- 24749 Grebel
- 24750 Ohm
- 24751 Kroemer
- 24753 Fujikake
- 24754 Zellyfry
- 24757 Kusano
- 24761 Ahau
- 24778 Nemsu
- 24779 Presque Isle
- 24794 Kurland
- 24808 Iwanaguchi
- 24816 Einagahideo
- 24818 Menichelli
- 24825 Ebeshireiko
- 24826 Pascoli
- 24827 Maryphil
- 24829 Berounurbi
- 24830 Kawanotomoyoshi
- 24837 Mšecké Žehrovice
- 24838 Abilunon
- 24841 Imatani
- 24844 Hwanginjoon
- 24847 Polesný
- 24850 Biagiomarin
- 24856 Messidoro
- 24857 Sperello
- 24858 Diethelm
- 24862 Hromec
- 24863 Cheli
- 24889 Tamurahosinomura
- 24890 Amaliafinzi
- 24898 Alanholmes
- 24899 Dominiona
- 24907 Alfredhaar
- 24910 Haruoando
- 24911 Kojimashigemi
- 24916 Stelzhamer
- 24918 Tedkooser
- 24919 Teruyoshi
- 24922 Bechtel
- 24923 Claralouisa
- 24926 Jinpan
- 24927 Brianpalmer
- 24928 Susanbehel
- 24930 Annajamison
- 24931 Noeth
- 24934 Natecovert
- 24935 Godfreyhardy
- 24939 Chiminello
- 24940 Sankichiyama
- 24944 Harish-Chandra
- 24945 Houziaux
- 24946 Foscolo
- 24947 Hausdorff
- 24948 Babote
- 24949 Klačka
- 24950 Nikhilas
- 24956 Qiannan
- 24959 Zielenbach
- 24960 Usukikenichi
- 24962 Kenjitoba
- 24965 Akayu
- 24967 Frištenský
- 24968 Chernyakhovsky
- 24969 Lucafini
- 24974 Macúch
- 24976 Jurajtoth
- 24977 Tongzhan
- 24981 Shigekimurakami
- 24984 Usui
- 24985 Benuri
- 24986 Yalefan
- 24988 Alainmilsztajn
- 24994 Prettyman
- 24996 Zerocalcare
- 24997 Petergabriel
- 24998 Hermite
- 24999 Hieronymus
- 25000 Astrometria
- 25001 Pacheco
- 25010 Guillermotimoner
- 25014 Christinepalau
- 25015 Lairdclose
- 25018 Valbousquet
- 25019 Walentosky
- 25020 Tinyacheng
- 25021 Nischaykumar
- 25022 Hemalibatra
- 25023 Sundaresh
- 25024 Calebmcgraw
- 25025 Joshuavo
- 25029 Ludwighesse
- 25032 Randallray
- 25034 Lesliemarie
- 25035 Scalesse
- 25036 Elizabethof
- 25038 Matebezdek
- 25039 Chensun
- 25042 Qiujun
- 25043 Fangxing
- 25045 Baixuefei
- 25046 Suyihan
- 25047 Tsuitehsin
- 25049 Christofnorn
- 25050 Michmadsen
- 25051 Vass
- 25052 Rudawska
- 25053 Matthewknight
- 25058 Shanegould
- 25062 Rasmussen
- 25065 Lautakkin
- 25073 Lautakshing
- 25074 Honami
- 25075 Kiyomoto
- 25082 Williamhodge
- 25084 Jutzi
- 25085 Melena
- 25087 Kaztaniguchi
- 25088 Yoshimura
- 25089 Sanabria-Rivera
- 25091 Sanchez-Claudio
- 25093 Andmikhaylov
- 25094 Zemtsov
- 25095 Churinov
- 25098 Gridnev
- 25099 Mashinskiy
- 25100 Zhaiweichao
- 25102 Zhaoye
- 25103 Kimdongyoung
- 25104 Chohyunghoon
- 25105 Kimnayeon
- 25106 Ryoojungmin
- 25108 Boström
- 25109 Hofving
- 25111 Klokun
- 25112 Mymeshkovych
- 25113 Benwasserman
- 25115 Drago
- 25116 Jonathanwang
- 25118 Kevlin
- 25119 Kakani
- 25120 Yvetteleung
- 25122 Kaitlingus
- 25124 Zahramaarouf
- 25125 Brodallan
- 25127 Laurentbrunetto
- 25129 Uranoscope
- 25131 Katiemelua
- 25133 Douglin
- 25137 Seansolomon
- 25138 Jaumann
- 25139 Roatsch
- 25140 Schmedemann
- 25142 Hopf
- 25143 Itokawa
- 25146 Xiada
- 25151 Stefanschröder
- 25152 Toplis
- 25153 Tomhockey
- 25154 Ayers
- 25155 van Belle
- 25156 Shkolnik
- 25157 Fabian
- 25158 Berman
- 25159 Michaelwest
- 25160 Joellama
- 25161 Strosahl
- 25162 Beckage
- 25163 Williammcdonald
- 25164 Sonomastate
- 25165 Leget
- 25166 Thompson
- 25175 Lukeandraka
- 25176 Thomasaunins
- 25178 Shreebose
- 25180 Kenyonconlin
- 25182 Siddhawan
- 25183 Grantfisher
- 25184 Taylorgaines
- 25189 Glockner
- 25190 Thomasgoodin
- 25191 Rachelouise
- 25193 Taliagreene
- 25198 Kylienicole
- 25199 Jiahegu
- 25212 Ayushgupta
- 25216 Enricobernardi
- 25225 Patrickbenson
- 25226 Brasch
- 25227 Genehill
- 25228 Mikekitt
- 25229 Karenkitt
- 25230 Borgis
- 25231 Naylor
- 25232 Schatz
- 25233 Tallman
- 25234 Odell
- 25237 Hurwitz
- 25240 Qiansanqiang
- 25250 Jonnapeterson
- 25256 Imbrie-Moore
- 25257 Elizmakarron
- 25258 Nathaniel
- 25259 Lucarnold
- 25264 Erickeen
- 25266 Taylorkinyon
- 25273 Barrycarole
- 25275 Jocelynbell
- 25276 Dimai
- 25290 Vibhuti
- 25294 Johnlaberee
- 25296 Minamisatsuma
- 25298 Fionapaine
- 25300 Andyromine
- 25301 Ambrofogar
- 25302 Niim
- 25309 Chrisauer
- 25312 Asiapossenti
- 25316 Comnick
- 25321 Rohitsingh
- 25322 Rebeccajean
- 25326 Lawrencesun
- 25331 Berrevoets
- 25333 Britwenger
- 25337 Elisabetta
- 25340 Segoves
- 25348 Wisniowiecki
- 25354 Zdasiuk
- 25358 Boskovice
- 25364 Allisonbaas
- 25365 Bernreuter
- 25366 Maureenbobo
- 25367 Cicek
- 25368 Gailcolwell
- 25369 Dawndonovan
- 25370 Karenfletch
- 25371 Frangaley
- 25372 Shanagarza
- 25373 Gorsch
- 25374 Harbrucker
- 25375 Treenajoi
- 25376 Christikeen
- 25377 Rolaberee
- 25378 Erinlambert
- 25381 Jerrynelson
- 25383 Lindacker
- 25384 Partizánske
- 25399 Vonnegut
- 25402 Angelanorse
- 25403 Carlapiazza
- 25404 Shansample
- 25405 Jeffwidder
- 25406 Debwysocki
- 25410 Abejar
- 25412 Arbesfeld
- 25413 Dorischen
- 25414 Cherkassky
- 25415 Jocelyn
- 25416 Chyanwen
- 25417 Coquillette
- 25418 Deshmukh
- 25421 Gafaran
- 25422 Abigreene
- 25424 Gunasekaran
- 25425 Chelsealynn
- 25426 Alexanderkim
- 25427 Kratchmarov
- 25428 Lakhanpal
- 25430 Ericlarson
- 25432 Josepherli
- 25434 Westonia
- 25455 Anissamak
- 25456 Caitlinmann
- 25457 Mariannamao
- 25462 Haydenmetsky
- 25464 Maxrabinovich
- 25465 Rajagopalan
- 25468 Ramakrishna
- 25469 Ransohoff
- 25472 Joanoro
- 25475 Lizrao
- 25476 Sealfon
- 25477 Preyashah
- 25478 Shrock
- 25479 Ericshyu
- 25481 Willjaysun
- 25482 Tallapragada
- 25483 Trusheim
- 25486 Michaelwham
- 25488 Figueiredo
- 25490 Kevinkelly
- 25491 Meador
- 25492 Firnberg
- 25495 Michaelroddy
- 25497 Brauerman
- 25509 Rodwong
- 25510 Donvincent
- 25511 Annlipinsky
- 25512 Anncomins
- 25513 Weseley
- 25514 Lisawu
- 25515 Briancarey
- 25516 Davidknight
- 25517 Davidlau
- 25518 Paulcitrin
- 25519 Bartolomeo
- 25520 Deronchang
- 25521 Stevemorgan
- 25522 Roisen
- 25531 Lessek
- 25538 Markcarlson
- 25539 Roberthelm
- 25541 Greathouse
- 25542 Garabedian
- 25543 Fruen
- 25544 Renerogers
- 25549 Jonsauer
- 25551 Drewhall
- 25552 Gaster
- 25553 Ivanlafer
- 25554 Jayaranjan
- 25555 Ratnavarma
- 25560 Chaihaoxi
- 25561 Leehyunki
- 25562 Limdarren
- 25565 Lusiyang
- 25566 Panying
- 25570 Kesun
- 25573 Wanghaoyu
- 25577 Wangmanqiang
- 25580 Xuelai
- 25584 Zhangnelson
- 25589 Danicamckellar
- 25593 Camillejordan
- 25594 Kessler
- 25597 Glendahill
- 25601 Francopacini
- 25602 Ucaronia
- 25604 Karlin
- 25606 Chiangshenghao
- 25607 Tsengiching
- 25608 Hincapie
- 25609 Bogantes
- 25611 Mabellin
- 25612 Yaoskalucia
- 25613 Bubenicek
- 25614 Jankral
- 25615 Votroubek
- 25616 Riinuots
- 25617 Thomasnesch
- 25619 Martonspohn
- 25620 Jayaprakash
- 25624 Kronecker
- 25625 Verdenet
- 25628 Kummer
- 25629 Mukherjee
- 25630 Sarkar
- 25636 Vaishnav
- 25638 Ahissar
- 25639 Fedina
- 25640 Klintefelt
- 25642 Adiseshan
- 25645 Alexanderyan
- 25646 Noniearora
- 25648 Baghel
- 25650 Shaubakshi
- 25652 Maddieball
- 25653 Baskaran
- 25655 Baupeter
- 25656 Bejnood
- 25657 Berkowitz
- 25658 Bokor
- 25659 Liboynton
- 25662 Chonofsky
- 25663 Nickmycroft
- 25669 Kristinrose
- 25670 Densley
- 25673 Di Mascio
- 25674 Kevinellis
- 25676 Jesseellison
- 25677 Aaronenten
- 25678 Ericfoss
- 25679 Andrewguo
- 25680 Walterhansen
- 25683 Haochenhong
- 25685 Katlinhornig
- 25686 Stephoskins
- 25688 Hritzo
- 25689 Duannihuang
- 25690 Iredale
- 25693 Ishitani
- 25695 Eileenjang
- 25696 Kylejones
- 25697 Kadiyala
- 25698 Snehakannan
- 25701 Alexkeeler
- 25704 Kendrick
- 25706 Cekoscielski
- 25708 Vedantkumar
- 25710 Petelandgren
- 25711 Lebovits
- 25714 Aprillee
- 25715 Lizmariemako
- 25717 Ritikmal
- 25720 Mallidi
- 25721 Anartya
- 25722 Evanmarshall
- 25723 Shamascharak
- 25725 McCormick
- 25727 Karsonmiller
- 25742 Amandablanco
- 25743 Serrato
- 25744 Surajmishra
- 25745 Schimmelpenninck
- 25746 Nickscoville
- 25747 Nicerasmus
- 25750 Miwnay
- 25751 Mokshagundam
- 25760 Annaspitz
- 25763 Naveenmurali
- 25764 Divyanag
- 25765 Heatherlynne
- 25766 Nosarzewski
- 25767 Stevennoyce
- 25768 Nussbaum
- 25769 Munaoli
- 25772 Ashpatra
- 25775 Danielpeng
- 25778 Csere
- 25781 Rajendra
- 25783 Brandontyler
- 25793 Chrisanchez
- 25798 Reneeschaaf
- 25799 Anmaschlegel
- 25800 Glukhovsky
- 25801 Oliviaschwob
- 25807 Baharshah
- 25811 Richardteo
- 25813 Savannahshaw
- 25814 Preesinghal
- 25815 Scottskirlo
- 25817 Tahilramani
- 25819 Tripathi
- 25822 Carolinejune
- 25823 Dentrujillo
- 25824 Viviantsang
- 25832 Van Scoyoc
- 25834 Vechinski
- 25835 Tomzega
- 25836 Harishvemuri
- 25851 Browning
- 25858 Donherbert
- 25864 Banič
- 25867 DeMuth
- 25869 Jacoby
- 25870 Panchovigil
- 25875 Wickramasekara
- 25877 Katherinexue
- 25878 Sihengyou
- 25884 Asai
- 25885 Wiesinger
- 25890 Louisburg
- 25892 Funabashi
- 25893 Sugihara
- 25898 Alpoge
- 25899 Namratanand
- 25901 Ericbrooks
- 25903 Yuvalcalev
- 25905 Clerico
- 25906 Morrell
- 25907 Capodilupo
- 25912 Recawkwell
- 25913 Jamesgreen
- 25914 Bair
- 25915 Charlesmcguire
- 25919 Comuniello
- 25920 Templeanne
- 25924 Douglasadams
- 25925 Jamesfenska
- 25927 Jagandelman
- 25930 Spielberg
- 25931 Peterhu
- 25933 Ruoyijiang
- 25937 Malysz
- 25938 Stoch
- 25940 Mikeschottland
- 25941 Susanahearn
- 25942 Walborn
- 25943 Billahearn
- 25944 Charlesross
- 25945 Moreadalleore
- 25951 Pamross
- 25953 Lanairlett
- 25954 Trantow
- 25955 Radway
- 25956 Spanierbeckage
- 25957 Davidconnell
- 25958 Battams
- 25959 Gingergiovale
- 25960 Timheckman
- 25961 Conti
- 25962 Yifanli
- 25963 Elisalin
- 25964 Liudavid
- 25965 Masihdas
- 25966 Akhilmathew
- 25970 Nelakanti
- 25972 Pfefferjosh
- 25973 Puranik
- 25978 Katerudolph
- 25979 Alansage
- 25981 Shahmirian
- 25986 Sunanda
- 25987 Katherynshi
- 25988 Janesuh
- 25992 Benjamensun
- 25993 Kevinxu
- 25994 Lynnelleye
- 26002 Angelayeung
- 26003 Amundson
- 26004 Loriying
- 26005 Alicezhao
- 26007 Lindazhou
- 26011 Cornelius
- 26012 Sanborn
- 26013 Amandalonzo
- 26027 Cotopaxi
- 26057 Ankaios
- 26074 Carlwirtz
- 26075 Levitsvet
- 26080 Pablomarques
- 26087 Zhuravleva
- 26090 Monrovia
- 26092 Norikonoriyuki
- 26097 Kamishi
- 26104 Masayukimori
- 26119 Duden
- 26122 Antonysutton
- 26123 Hiroshiyoshida
- 26127 Otakasakajyo
- 26151 Irinokaigan
- 26168 Kanaikiyotaka
- 26169 Ishikawakiyoshi
- 26170 Kazuhiko
- 26171 Katsunorikataoka
- 26177 Fabiodolfi
- 26183 Henrigodard
- 26188 Zengqingcun
- 26194 Chasolivier
- 26195 Černohlávek
- 26197 Bormio
- 26199 Aileenperry
- 26200 Van Doren
- 26201 Sayonisaha
- 26205 Kuratowski
- 26210 Lingas
- 26213 Ayani
- 26214 Kalinga
- 26223 Enari
- 26227 Tan
- 26232 Antink
- 26233 Jimbraun
- 26234 Leslibrinson
- 26235 Annemaduggan
- 26238 Elduval
- 26240 Leigheriks
- 26243 Sallyfenska
- 26246 Mikelake
- 26247 Doleonardi
- 26248 Longenecker
- 26250 Shaneludwig
- 26251 Kiranmanne
- 26252 Chase
- 26255 Carmarques
- 26259 Marzigliano
- 26261 Tinafreeman
- 26264 McIntyre
- 26266 Andrewmerrill
- 26267 Nickmorgan
- 26268 Nardi
- 26269 Marciaprill
- 26271 Lindapuster
- 26273 Kateschafer
- 26275 Jefsoulier
- 26276 Natrees
- 26277 Ianrees
- 26282 Noahbrosch
- 26283 Oswalt
- 26284 Johnspahn
- 26285 Lindaspahn
- 26291 Terristaples
- 26293 Van Muyden
- 26295 Vilardi
- 26298 Dunweathers
- 26300 Herbweiss
- 26301 Hellawillis
- 26302 Zimolzak
- 26307 Friedafein
- 26312 Ciardi
- 26313 Lorilombardi
- 26314 Škvorecký
- 26319 Miyauchi
- 26323 Wuqijin
- 26328 Litomyšl
- 26329 Cleoabram
- 26331 Kondamuri
- 26332 Alyssehrlich
- 26333 Joachim
- 26334 Melimcdowell
- 26336 Mikemcdowell
- 26337 Matthewagam
- 26340 Evamarková
- 26345 Gedankien
- 26355 Grueber
- 26356 Aventini
- 26357 Laguerre
- 26368 Alghunaim
- 26376 Roborosa
- 26382 Charlieduke
- 26386 Adelinacozma
- 26389 Poojarambhia
- 26390 Rušin
- 26393 Scaffa
- 26394 Kandola
- 26395 Megkurohara
- 26396 Chengjingjie
- 26397 Carolynsinow
- 26399 Rileyennis
- 26400 Roshanpalli
- 26401 Sobotište
- 26411 Jocorbferg
- 26412 Charlesyu
- 26414 Amychyao
- 26417 Michaelgord
- 26422 Marekbuchman
- 26424 Jacquelihung
- 26425 Linchichieh
- 26426 Koechl
- 26429 Andiwagner
- 26430 Thomwilkason
- 26433 Michaelyurko
- 26435 Juliebrisset
- 26438 Durling
- 26441 Nanayakkara
- 26442 Matfernandez
- 26447 Akrishnan
- 26448 Tongjili
- 26450 Tanyapetach
- 26451 Khweis
- 26455 Priyamshah
- 26457 Naomishah
- 26458 Choihyuna
- 26459 Shinsubin
- 26462 Albertcui
- 26466 Zarrin
- 26467 Jamespopper
- 26468 Ianchan
- 26471 Tracybecker
- 26474 Davidsimon
- 26475 Krisztisugar
- 26478 Cristianrosu
- 26485 Edwinpost
- 26488 Beiser
- 26493 Paulsucala
- 26495 Eichorn
- 26498 Dinotina
- 26499 Robertazabotti
- 26500 Toshiohino
- 26501 Sachiko
- 26502 Traviscole
- 26503 Avicramer
- 26504 Brandonli
- 26505 Olextokarev
- 26507 Mikelin
- 26508 Jimmylin
- 26513 Newberry
- 26518 Bhuiyan
- 26522 Juliapoje
- 26526 Jookayhyun
- 26527 Leasure
- 26528 Genniferubin
- 26530 Lucferreira
- 26532 Eduardoboff
- 26533 Aldering
- 26537 Shyamalbuch
- 26541 Garyross
- 26544 Ajjarapu
- 26545 Meganperkins
- 26546 Arulmani
- 26548 Joykutty
- 26549 Tankanran
- 26551 Shenliangbo
- 26557 Aakritijain
- 26559 Chengcheng
- 26575 Andreapugh
- 26578 Cellinekim
- 26586 Harshaw
- 26587 Arthurstorbo
- 26588 Sharonstorbo
- 26591 Robertreeves
- 26592 Maryrenfro
- 26593 Perrypat
- 26604 Ensign
- 26605 Hanley
- 26611 Madzlandon
- 26612 Sunsetastro
- 26613 Brettwhite
- 26618 Yixinli
- 26620 Yihuali
- 26622 Maxwimberley
- 26629 Zahller
- 26634 Balasubramanian
- 26636 Ericabroman
- 26639 Murgaš
- 26640 Bahýľ
- 26642 Schlenoff
- 26647 Brabham
- 26652 Klinglesmith
- 26653 Amymeyer
- 26654 Ericjohnson
- 26656 Samarenae
- 26659 Skirda
- 26660 Samahalpern
- 26661 Kempelen
- 26664 Jongwon
- 26665 Sidjena
- 26666 Justinto
- 26667 Sherwinwu
- 26668 Tonyho
- 26671 Williamlopes
- 26672 Ericabrooke
- 26678 Garner
- 26679 Thomassilver
- 26680 Wangchristi
- 26681 Niezgay
- 26682 Evanfletcher
- 26683 Jamesmccarthy
- 26685 Khojandi
- 26686 Ellenprice
- 26688 Wangenevieve
- 26689 Smorrison
- 26691 Lareegardner
- 26693 Katharinecorbin
- 26694 Wenxili
- 26696 Gechenzhang
- 26698 Maryschroeder
- 26699 Masoncole
- 26702 Naber
- 26703 Price
- 26707 Navrazhnykh
- 26711 Rebekahbau
- 26712 Stewart
- 26713 Iusukyin
- 26715 South Dakota
- 26717 Jasonye
- 26720 Yangxinyan
- 26727 Wujunjun
- 26728 Luwenqi
- 26732 Damianpeach
- 26733 Nanavisitor
- 26734 Terryfarrell
- 26736 Rojeski
- 26737 Adambradley
- 26738 Lishizhen
- 26739 Hemaeberhart
- 26740 Camacho
- 26743 Laichinglung
- 26744 Marthahaynes
- 26745 Szeglin
- 26748 Targovnik
- 26757 Bastei
- 26761 Stromboli
- 26763 Peirithoos
- 26792 Pintado
- 26793 Bolshoi
- 26794 Yukioniimi
- 26795 Basilashvili
- 26800 Gualtierotrucco
- 26806 Kushiike
- 26808 Takeoroumon
- 26811 Hiesinger
- 26821 Baehr
- 26828 Narusawa
- 26829 Sakaihoikuen
- 26837 Yoshitakaokazaki
- 26842 Hefele
- 26849 De Paepe
- 26851 Sarapul
- 26852 Miyamototakashi
- 26855 Yasukohasegawa
- 26857 Veracruz
- 26858 Misterrogers
- 26871 Tanezrouft
- 26879 Haines
- 26883 Marcelproust
- 26886 Takahara
- 26887 Tokyogiants
- 26891 Johnbutler
- 26896 Josefhudec
- 26897 Červená
- 26906 Rubidia
- 26908 Lebesgue
- 26909 Lefschetz
- 26917 Pianoro
- 26919 Shoichimiyata
- 26921 Jensallit
- 26922 Samara
- 26924 Johnharvey
- 26934 Jordancotler
- 26935 Vireday
- 26937 Makimiyamoto
- 26938 Jackli
- 26939 Jiachengli
- 26940 Quintero
- 26942 Nealkuhn
- 26945 Sushko
- 26946 Ziziyu
- 26947 Angelawang
- 26948 Annasato
- 26950 Legendre
- 26954 Skadiang
- 26955 Lie
- 26960 Liouville
- 26963 Palorapavý
- 26964 Randykamiya
- 26969 Biver
- 26970 Eliáš
- 26971 Sezimovo Ústí
- 26973 Lála
- 26984 Fernand-Roland
- 26986 Čáslavská
- 26990 Culbertson
- 26993 Littlewood
- 26998 Iriso
- 27003 Katoizumi
- 27004 Violetaparra
- 27005 Dariaguidetti
- 27023 Juuliamoreau
- 27032 Veazey
- 27047 Boisvert
- 27048 Jangong
- 27049 Kraus
- 27050 Beresheet
- 27052 Katebush
- 27054 Williamgoddard
- 27056 Ginoloria
- 27061 Wong
- 27062 Brookeminer
- 27063 Richardmontano
- 27071 Rangwala
- 27072 Aggarwal
- 27074 Etatolia
- 27079 Vsetín
- 27082 Donaldson-Hanna
- 27083 Alethialittle
- 27084 Heidilarson
- 27086 Italicobrass
- 27087 Tillmannmohr
- 27088 Valmez
- 27091 Alisonbick
- 27094 Salgari
- 27095 Girardiwanda
- 27096 Jelenalane
- 27098 Bocarsly
- 27099 Xiaoyucao
- 27101 Wenyucao
- 27102 Emilychen
- 27103 Sungwoncho
- 27105 Clarkben
- 27106 Jongoldman
- 27107 Michelleabi
- 27108 Bryanhe
- 27110 Annemaryvonne
- 27114 Lukasiewicz
- 27120 Isabelhawkins
- 27121 Joardar
- 27123 Matthewlam
- 27125 Siyilee
- 27126 Bonnielei
- 27130 Dipaola
- 27132 Ježek
- 27141 Krystleleung
- 27147 Mercedessosa
- 27150 Annasante
- 27158 Benedetti-Rossi
- 27169 Annelabruzzo
- 27172 Brucekosaveach
- 27178 Quino
- 27182 Korinotenmondai
- 27184 Ciabattari
- 27192 Selenali
- 27194 Jonathanli
- 27197 Andrewliu
- 27208 Jennyliu
- 27217 Mattieharrington
- 27224 Telus
- 27227 McAdam
- 27233 Mahajan
- 27234 Timdodd
- 27236 Millermatt
- 27238 Keenanmonks
- 27239 O'Dorney
- 27240 Robhall
- 27241 Sunilpai
- 27244 Parthasarathy
- 27248 Schristensen
- 27253 Graceleanor
- 27254 Shubhrosaha
- 27257 Tang-Quan
- 27258 Chelseavoss
- 27261 Yushiwang
- 27263 Elainezhou
- 27264 Frankclayton
- 27265 Toddgonzales
- 27267 Wiberg
- 27269 Albinocarbognani
- 27270 Guidotti
- 27276 Davidblack
- 27277 Pattybrown
- 27279 Boburan
- 27280 Manettedavies
- 27282 Deborahday
- 27284 Billdunbar
- 27286 Adedmondson
- 27287 Garbarino
- 27288 Paulgilmore
- 27289 Myrahalpin
- 27291 Greghansen
- 27296 Kathyhurd
- 27301 Joeingalls
- 27302 Jeankobis
- 27303 Leitner
- 27309 Serenamccalla
- 27311 Shannongonzales
- 27312 Sconantgilbert
- 27314 Janemcdonald
- 27320 Vellinga
- 27323 Julianewman
- 27326 Jimobrien
- 27327 Lindaplante
- 27328 Pohlonski
- 27330 Markporter
- 27332 Happritchard
- 27336 Mikequinn
- 27338 Malaraghavan
- 27341 Fabiomuzzi
- 27342 Joescanio
- 27343 Deannashea
- 27344 Vesevlada
- 27347 Dworkin
- 27348 Mink
- 27349 Enos
- 27353 Chrisspenner
- 27354 Stiklaitis
- 27356 Mattstrom
- 27362 Morganroche
- 27363 Alvanclark
- 27365 Henryfitz
- 27368 Raytesar
- 27372 Ujifusa
- 27373 Davidvernon
- 27374 Yim
- 27375 Asirvatham
- 27381 Balasingam
- 27382 Justinbarber
- 27383 Braebenedict
- 27384 Meaganbethel
- 27385 Andblonsky
- 27386 Chadcampbell
- 27387 Chhabra
- 27390 Kyledavis
- 27392 Valerieding
- 27396 Shuji
- 27397 D'Souza
- 27399 Gehring
- 27400 Mikewong
- 27405 Danielfeeny
- 27407 Haodo
- 27408 Kellyferguson
- 27409 Addiedove
- 27410 Grimmett
- 27411 Laurenhall
- 27412 Teague
- 27413 Ambruster
- 27417 Jessjohnson
- 27420 Shontobegay
- 27421 Nathanhan
- 27422 Robheckman
- 27423 Dennisbowers
- 27425 Bakker
- 27426 Brettlawrie
- 27431 Jimcole
- 27432 Kevinconley
- 27433 Hylak
- 27434 Anirudhjain
- 27438 Carolynjons
- 27439 Kamimura
- 27440 Colekendrick
- 27445 Lynnlane
- 27446 Landoni
- 27447 Ichunlin
- 27449 Jamarkley
- 27450 Monzon
- 27452 Nikhilpatel
- 27453 Crystalpoole
- 27454 Samapaige
- 27456 Sarkisian
- 27457 Tovinkere
- 27458 Williamwhite
- 27465 Cambroziak
- 27466 Cargibaysal
- 27470 Debrabeckett
- 27478 Kevinbloh
- 27480 Heablonsky
- 27491 Broksas
- 27492 Susanduncan
- 27493 Derikesibill
- 27495 Heatherfennell
- 27500 Mandelbrot
- 27502 Stephbecca
- 27503 Dankof
- 27504 Denune
- 27505 Catieblazek
- 27506 Glassmeier
- 27507 Travisbrown
- 27508 Johncompton
- 27509 Burcher
- 27510 Lisaactor
- 27511 Emiliedunham
- 27512 Gilstrap
- 27513 Mishapipe
- 27514 Markov
- 27515 Gunnels
- 27519 Miames
- 27520 Rounds
- 27521 Josschindler
- 27522 Lenkenyon
- 27524 Clousing
- 27525 Vartovka
- 27527 Kirkkoehler
- 27529 Rhiannonmayne
- 27530 Daveshuck
- 27531 Sweaton
- 27532 Buchwald-Wright
- 27533 Johnbrucato
- 27537 Dianaweintraub
- 27539 Elmoutamid
- 27540 Kevinwhite
- 27546 Maryfran
- 27549 Joannemichet
- 27551 Pelayo
- 27556 Williamprem
- 27562 Josephmarcus
- 27563 Staceychristen
- 27564 Astreichelt
- 27565 de Wet
- 27570 Erinschumacher
- 27571 Bobscott
- 27572 Shurtleff
- 27576 Denisespirou
- 27578 Yogisullivan
- 27580 Angelataylor
- 27582 Jackieterrel
- 27584 Barbaravelez
- 27588 Wegley
- 27589 Paigegentry
- 27590 Koarimatsu
- 27591 Rugilmartin
- 27593 Oliviamarie
- 27595 Hnath
- 27596 Maldives
- 27597 Varuniyer
- 27602 Chaselewis
- 27604 Affeldt
- 27606 Davidli
- 27610 Shixuanli
- 27613 Annalou
- 27615 Daniellu
- 27618 Ceilierin
- 27619 Ethanmessier
- 27620 Kristenwalsh
- 27622 Richardbaker
- 27626 Kirkbender
- 27656 Aleblain
- 27657 Berkhey
- 27658 Dmitrijbagalej
- 27659 Dolsky
- 27660 Waterwayuni
- 27675 Paulmaley
- 27706 Strogen
- 27709 Orenburg
- 27710 Henseling
- 27711 Kirschvink
- 27712 Coudray
- 27714 Dochu
- 27716 Nobuyuki
- 27718 Gouda
- 27719 Fast
- 27724 Jeannoël
- 27736 Ekaterinburg
- 27739 Kimihiro
- 27740 Obatomoyuki
- 27748 Vivianhoette
- 27749 Tsukadaken
- 27758 Michelson
- 27764 von Flüe
- 27765 Brockhaus
- 27775 Lilialmanzor
- 27776 Cortland
- 27784 Elizabethpearce
- 27787 Andokazuma
- 27789 Astrakhan
- 27790 Urashimataro
- 27791 Masaru
- 27792 Fridakahlo
- 27809 Murakamiyasuhiko
- 27810 Daveturner
- 27815 Katsuhito
- 27816 Naitohiroyuki
- 27827 Ukai
- 27844 Fumitake
- 27845 Josephmeyer
- 27846 Honegger
- 27849 Suyumbika
- 27855 Giorgilli
- 27861 Sudachikako
- 27864 Antongraff
- 27865 Ludgerfroebel
- 27870 Jillwatson
- 27879 Shibata
- 27882 Ootanihideji
- 27887 Kiyoharu
- 27895 Yeduzheng
- 27896 Tourminator
- 27899 Letterman
- 27900 Cecconi
- 27910 Yangfuyu
- 27915 Nancywright
- 27917 Edoardo
- 27918 Azusagawa
- 27920 Noguchiujo
- 27922 Mascheroni
- 27923 Dimitribartolini
- 27928 Nithintumma
- 27930 Nakamatsu
- 27931 Zeitlin-Trinkle
- 27932 Leonyao
- 27938 Guislain
- 27947 Emilemathieu
- 27949 Jonasz
- 27952 Atapuerca
- 27955 Yasumasa
- 27958 Giussano
- 27959 Fagioli
- 27960 Dobiáš
- 27961 Kostelecký
- 27963 Hartkopf
- 27966 Changguang
- 27967 Beppebianchi
- 27968 Bobylapointe
- 27974 Drejsl
- 27975 Mazurkiewicz
- 27977 Distratis
- 27978 Lubosluka
- 27982 Atsushimiyazaki
- 27983 Bernardi
- 27984 Herminefranz
- 27985 Remanzacco
- 27986 Hanuš
- 27988 Menabrea
- 27991 Koheijimiura
- 27997 Bandos
- 28004 Terakawa
- 28007 Galhassin
- 28019 Warchal
- 28037 Williammonts
- 28038 Nicoleodzer
- 28039 Mauraoei
- 28042 Mayapatel
- 28043 Mabelwheeler
- 28045 Johnwilkins
- 28048 Camilleyoke
- 28049 Yvonnealex
- 28050 Asekomeh
- 28051 Bruzzone
- 28052 Lowellputnam
- 28053 Kimberlyputnam
- 28057 Hollars
- 28059 Kiliaan
- 28068 Stephbillings
- 28072 Lindbowerman
- 28073 Fohner
- 28074 Matgallagher
- 28075 Emilyhoffman
- 28077 Hard
- 28078 Mauricehilleman
- 28081 Carriehudson
- 28091 Mikekane
- 28092 Joannekear
- 28093 Staceylevoit
- 28094 Michellewis
- 28095 Seanmahoney
- 28096 Kathrynmarsh
- 28103 Benmcpheron
- 28105 Santallo
- 28107 Sapar
- 28108 Sydneybarnes
- 28116 Kunovac
- 28117 Mort
- 28118 Vaux
- 28125 Juliomiguez
- 28126 Nydegger
- 28127 Ogden-Stenerson
- 28128 Cynthrossman
- 28129 Teresummers
- 28130 Troemper
- 28131 Dougwelch
- 28132 Karenzobel
- 28133 Kylebardwell
- 28136 Chasegross
- 28137 Helenyao
- 28141 ten Brummelaar
- 28146 Nackard
- 28147 Colbath
- 28148 Fuentes
- 28149 Arieldaniel
- 28151 Markknopfler
- 28155 Chengzhendai
- 28156 McColl
- 28159 Giuricich
- 28161 Neelpatel
- 28163 Lorikim
- 28165 Bayanmashat
- 28167 Andrewkim
- 28168 Evanolin
- 28169 Cathconte
- 28171 Diannahu
- 28173 Hisakichi
- 28174 Harue
- 28182 Chadharris
- 28183 Naidu
- 28184 Vaishnavirao
- 28193 Italosvevo
- 28196 Szeged
- 28201 Lifubin
- 28204 Liyakang
- 28206 Haozhongning
- 28207 Blakesmith
- 28208 Timtrippel
- 28209 Chatterjee
- 28210 Howardfeng
- 28220 York
- 28222 Neilpathak
- 28235 Kasparvonbraun
- 28242 Mingantu
- 28245 Cruise
- 28248 Barthélémy
- 28251 Gerbaldi
- 28254 Raghrama
- 28272 Mikejanner
- 28273 Maianhvu
- 28275 Quoc-Bao
- 28276 Filipnaiser
- 28277 Chengherngyi
- 28287 Osmanov
- 28295 Heyizheng
- 28299 Kanghaoyan
- 28305 Wangjiayi
- 28309 Ericfein
- 28317 Aislinndeely
- 28318 Janecox
- 28321 Arnabdey
- 28322 Kaeberich
- 28324 Davidcampeau
- 28331 Dianebérard
- 28340 Yukihiro
- 28341 Bingaman
- 28342 Haverhals
- 28343 Florcalandra
- 28344 Tallsalt
- 28345 Akivabarnun
- 28346 Kent
- 28351 Andrewfeldman
- 28353 Chrisnielsen
- 28364 Bruceelmegreen
- 28366 Verkuil
- 28376 Atifjaved
- 28382 Stevengillen
- 28390 Demjohopkins
- 28394 Mittag-Leffler
- 28396 Eymann
- 28397 Forrestbetton
- 28398 Ericthomas
- 28400 Morgansinko
- 28402 Matthewkim
- 28407 Meghanarao
- 28408 van Baalen
- 28411 Xiuqicao
- 28415 Yingxiong
- 28416 Ngqin
- 28417 Leewei
- 28418 Pornwasu
- 28419 Tanpitcha
- 28425 Sungkanit
- 28426 Sangani
- 28427 Gidwani
- 28428 Ankurvaishnav
- 28433 Samarquez
- 28436 Davesawyer
- 28437 Belényu
- 28438 Venkateswaran
- 28439 Miguelreyes
- 28442 Nicholashuey
- 28443 Crisara
- 28444 Alexrabii
- 28446 Davlantes
- 28447 Arjunmathur
- 28449 Ericlau
- 28450 Saravolz
- 28451 Tylerhoward
- 28452 Natkondamuri
- 28453 Alexcecil
- 28457 Chloeanassis
- 28460 Ariannepapa
- 28465 Janesmyth
- 28467 Maurentejamie
- 28468 Shichangxu
- 28474 Bustamante
- 28475 Garrett
- 28479 Varlotta
- 28480 Seojinyoung
- 28481 Shindongju
- 28482 Bauerle
- 28483 Allenyuan
- 28484 Aishwarya
- 28485 Dastidar
- 28488 Gautam
- 28492 Marik
- 28493 Duncan-Lewis
- 28494 Jasmine
- 28503 Angelazhang
- 28504 Rebeccafaye
- 28505 Sagarrambhia
- 28508 Kishore
- 28509 Feddersen
- 28511 Marggraff
- 28512 Tanyuan
- 28513 Guo
- 28516 Möbius
- 28519 Sweetman
- 28521 Mattmcintyre
- 28524 Ebright
- 28525 Andrewabboud
- 28527 Kathleenrose
- 28530 Shiyimeng
- 28531 Nikbogdanov
- 28533 Iansohl
- 28534 Taylorwilson
- 28535 Sungjanet
- 28536 Hunaiwen
- 28537 Kirapowell
- 28538 Ruisong
- 28542 Cespedes-Nano
- 28543 Solis-Gozar
- 28547 Johannschröter
- 28551 Paulomi
- 28553 Bhupatiraju
- 28554 Adambowman
- 28555 Jenniferchan
- 28556 Kevinchen
- 28557 Lillianchin
- 28558 Kathcordwell
- 28559 Anniedai
- 28563 Dantzler
- 28564 Gunderman
- 28568 Jacobjohnson
- 28569 Kallenbach
- 28570 Peterkraft
- 28571 Hannahlarson
- 28572 Salebreton
- 28575 McQuaid
- 28581 Dyerlytle
- 28582 Haileyosborn
- 28583 Mehrotra
- 28587 Mundkur
- 28589 Nisley
- 28590 Kyledilger
- 28591 Racheldilger
- 28592 O'Leary
- 28593 Ryanhamilton
- 28594 Ronaldballouz
- 28598 Apadmanabha
- 28599 Terenzoni
- 28600 Georgelucas
- 28601 Benton
- 28602 Westfall
- 28603 Jenkins
- 28607 Jiayipeng
- 28608 Sblomquist
- 28609 Tsirvoulis
- 28610 Stephenriggs
- 28611 Liliapopova
- 28614 Vejvoda
- 28618 Scibelli
- 28620 Anicia
- 28621 Marcfries
- 28622 Gabadirwe
- 28623 Olivermoses
- 28625 Selvakumar
- 28626 Meghanshea
- 28628 Kensenshi
- 28629 Solimano
- 28630 Mayuri
- 28631 Jacktakahashi
- 28632 Christraver
- 28633 Ratripathi
- 28636 Vasudevan
- 28638 Joywang
- 28640 Cathywong
- 28642 Zbarsky
- 28643 Kellyzhang
- 28644 Michaelzhang
- 28646 Alemran
- 28652 Andybramante
- 28653 Charliebrucker
- 28654 Davidcaine
- 28655 Erincolfax
- 28656 Doreencurtin
- 28657 Briandempsey
- 28660 Derbes
- 28661 Jimdickens
- 28662 Ericduran
- 28664 Maryellenfay
- 28665 Theresafultz
- 28666 Trudygessler
- 28667 Whithagins
- 28669 Bradhelsel
- 28672 Karolhiggins
- 28673 Valholmes
- 28675 Suejohnston
- 28676 Bethkoester
- 28677 Laurakowalski
- 28678 Lindquester
- 28680 Sandralitvin
- 28681 Loseke
- 28682 Newhams
- 28683 Victorostrik
- 28686 Tamsenprofit
- 28687 Reginareals
- 28688 Diannerister
- 28689 Rohrback
- 28690 Beshellem
- 28692 Chanleysmall
- 28695 Zwanzig
- 28697 Eitanacks
- 28698 Aakshi
- 28700 Balachandar
- 28705 Michaelbecker
- 28707 Drewbecker
- 28710 Rebeccab
- 28711 Oliverburnett
- 28712 Elizabethcorn
- 28714 Gandall
- 28715 Garimella
- 28716 Calebgonser
- 28718 Rivergrace
- 28719 Sahoolahan
- 28720 Krystalrose
- 28722 Dhruviyer
- 28723 Cameronjones
- 28724 Stott
- 28726 Kailey-Steiner
- 28729 Moivre
- 28732 Rheakamat
- 28734 Austinmccoy
- 28737 Mohindra
- 28738 Carolinolan
- 28739 Julisauer
- 28740 Nathansperry
- 28742 Hannahsteele
- 28743 Schuitemaker
- 28744 Annikagustafsson
- 28747 Swintosky
- 28750 Brennawallin
- 28751 Eggl
- 28757 Seanweber
- 28759 Joshwentzel
- 28760 Grantwomble
- 28765 Katherinewu
- 28766 Monge
- 28769 Elisabethadams
- 28770 Sarahrines
- 28772 Bonamico
- 28778 Michdelucia
- 28779 Acthieke
- 28780 Lisadeaver
- 28781 Timothylohr
- 28782 Mechling
- 28784 Deringer
- 28785 Woodjohn
- 28787 Peterpinko
- 28788 Hayes-Gehrke
- 28791 Edithsykeslowell
- 28792 Davidlowell
- 28793 Donaldpaul
- 28794 Crowley
- 28795 Alexelbert
- 28796 Ragozzine
- 28798 Audreymartin
- 28799 Christopherford
- 28800 Speth
- 28801 Maryanderson
- 28802 Boborino
- 28803 Roe
- 28805 Föhring
- 28807 Lisawaller
- 28808 Ananthnarayan
- 28809 Pierrebeck
- 28810 Suchandler
- 28813 Jeffreykurtz
- 28816 Kimneville
- 28817 Simoneflood
- 28818 Kellyryan
- 28819 Karinritchey
- 28820 Sylrobertson
- 28821 Harryanselmo
- 28822 Angelabarker
- 28823 Archibald
- 28824 Marlablair
- 28825 Bryangoehring
- 28828 Aalamiharandi
- 28829 Abelsky
- 28831 Abu-Alshaikh
- 28832 Akana
- 28833 Arunachalam
- 28836 Ashmore
- 28837 Nibalachandar
- 28841 Kelseybarter
- 28842 Bhowmik
- 28848 Nicolemarie
- 28851 Londonbolsius
- 28852 Westonbraun
- 28853 Bukhamsin
- 28854 Budisteanu
- 28855 Burchell
- 28860 Cappelletto
- 28864 Franciscocordova
- 28866 Chakraborty
- 28868 Rianchandra
- 28869 Chaubal
- 28874 Michaelchen
- 28878 Segner
- 28883 Kouveliotou
- 28884 Youngjunchoi
- 28886 Ericajawin
- 28887 Sabina
- 28888 Agrusa
- 28889 Turrentine
- 28890 Gabaldon
- 28894 Ryanchung
- 28911 Mishacollins
- 28912 Sonahosseini
- 28916 Logancollins
- 28917 Zacollins
- 28924 Jennanncsele
- 28926 Adamnimoy
- 28932 Izidoro
- 28934 Meagancurrie
- 28935 Kevincyr
- 28936 Dalapati
- 28942 Yennydieguez
- 28945 Taideding
- 28948 Disalvo
- 28950 Ailisdooner
- 28952 Ericepstein
- 28953 Hollyerickson
- 28954 Feiyiou
- 28955 Kaliadeborah
- 28957 Danielfulop
- 28958 Binns
- 28963 Tamyiu
- 28964 Ashokverma
- 28966 Yuyingshih
- 28967 Gerhardter
- 28968 Gongmiaoxin
- 28969 Youngminjeongahn
- 28975 Galinborisov
- 28976 Sevigny
- 28978 Ixion
- 28980 Chowyunfat
- 28983 Omergranek
- 28987 Assafin
- 28989 Lenaadams
- 28990 Ariheinze
- 28992 Timbrothers
- 28994 Helenabates
- 28995 Marquess
- 29053 Muskau
- 29080 Astrocourier
- 29081 Krymradio
- 29085 Sethanne
- 29122 Vasadze
- 29125 Kyivphysfak
- 29127 Karnath
- 29132 Bradpitt
- 29133 Vargas
- 29137 Alanboss
- 29144 Taitokufuji
- 29146 McHone
- 29148 Palzer
- 29157 Higashinihon
- 29159 Asakawa
- 29160 São Paulo
- 29167 Masataka
- 29185 Reich
- 29186 Lake Tekapo
- 29187 Le Monnier
- 29189 Udinsk
- 29193 Dolphyn
- 29196 Dius
- 29197 Gleim
- 29198 Weathers
- 29199 Himeji
- 29203 Schnitger
- 29204 Ladegast
- 29208 Halorentz
- 29210 Robertbrown
- 29212 Zeeman
- 29214 Apitzsch
- 29220 Xavierbaptista
- 29227 Wegener
- 29244 Van Damme
- 29246 Clausius
- 29249 Hiraizumi
- 29250 Helmutmoritz
- 29251 Hosokawa
- 29252 Konjikido
- 29292 Conniewalker
- 29298 Cruls
- 29299 Kazama
- 29307 Torbernbergman
- 29311 Lesire
- 29314 Eurydamas
- 29328 Hanshintigers
- 29329 Knobelsdorff
- 29337 Hakurojo
- 29345 Ivandanilov
- 29346 Mariadina
- 29347 Natta
- 29348 Criswick
- 29353 Manu
- 29355 Siratakayama
- 29356 Giovarduino
- 29361 Botticelli
- 29362 Azumakofuzi
- 29363 Ghigabartolini
- 29373 Hamanowa
- 29374 Kazumitsu
- 29391 Knight
- 29394 Hirokohamanowa
- 29401 Astérix
- 29402 Obélix
- 29404 Hikarusato
- 29408 Katoyuko
- 29419 Mládková
- 29420 Ikuo
- 29427 Oswaldthomas
- 29428 Ettoremajorana
- 29430 Mimiyen
- 29431 Shijimi
- 29432 Williamscott
- 29435 Mordell
- 29437 Marchais
- 29438 Zhengjia
- 29439 Maxfabiani
- 29443 Remocorti
- 29446 Gouguenheim
- 29447 Jerzyneyman
- 29448 Pappos
- 29449 Taharbenjelloun
- 29450 Tomohiroohno
- 29456 Evakrchová
- 29457 Marcopolo
- 29458 Pearson
- 29463 Benjaminpeirce
- 29464 Leonmiš
- 29467 Shandongdaxue
- 29470 Higgs
- 29471 Spejbl
- 29472 Hurvínek
- 29473 Krejčí
- 29474 Toyoshima
- 29476 Kvíčala
- 29477 Zdíkšíma
- 29483 Boeker
- 29484 Honzaveselý
- 29490 Myslbek
- 29491 Pfaff
- 29508 Bottinelli
- 29509 Kuangtingyun
- 29514 Karatsu
- 29528 Kaplinski
- 29547 Yurimazzanti
- 29549 Sandrasbaragli
- 29550 Yaribartolini
- 29552 Chern
- 29555 MACEK
- 29561 Iatteri
- 29562 Danmacdonald
- 29565 Glenngould
- 29568 Gobbi-Belcredi
- 29575 Gundlapalli
- 29585 Johnhale
- 29605 Joshuacolwell
- 29607 Jakehecla
- 29609 Claudiahuang
- 29610 Iyengar
- 29612 Cindyjiang
- 29613 Charlespicard
- 29614 Sheller
- 29618 Jinandrew
- 29619 Kapurubandage
- 29620 Gurbanikaur
- 29624 Sugiyama
- 29628 Fedorets
- 29631 Ryankenny
- 29632 Yaejikim
- 29633 Weatherwax
- 29634 Sabrinaaksil
- 29638 Eeshakhare
- 29641 Kaikloepfer
- 29642 Archiekong
- 29643 Plücker
- 29645 Kutsenok
- 29646 Polya
- 29647 Poncelet
- 29650 Toldy
- 29654 Michaellaue
- 29655 Yarimlee
- 29656 Leejoseph
- 29657 Andreali
- 29658 Henrylin
- 29659 Zeyuliu
- 29660 Jessmacalpine
- 29663 Evanmackay
- 29668 Ipf
- 29672 Salvo
- 29674 Raušal
- 29675 Ippolitonievo
- 29681 Saramanshad
- 29685 Soibamansoor
- 29686 Raymondmaung
- 29687 Mohdreza
- 29690 Nistala
- 29691 Ramónallerulloa
- 29692 Černis
- 29696 Distasio
- 29700 Salmon
- 29701 Peggyhaas
- 29705 Cialucy
- 29706 Simonetta
- 29722 Chrisgraham
- 29725 Mikewest
- 29728 Averbeck
- 29730 Bethwestfall
- 29736 Fichtelberg
- 29737 Norihiro
- 29738 Ivobudil
- 29745 Mareknovak
- 29747 Acorlando
- 29750 Chleborad
- 29753 Silvo
- 29760 Milevsko
- 29761 Lorenzo
- 29762 Panasiewicz
- 29764 Panneerselvam
- 29765 Miparedes
- 29770 Timmpiper
- 29772 Portocarrero
- 29773 Samuelpritt
- 29776 Radzhabov
- 29783 Sanjanarane
- 29787 Timrenier
- 29788 Rachelrossi
- 29799 Trinirussell
- 29800 Valeriesarge
- 29802 Rikhavshah
- 29803 Michaelshao
- 29804 Idansharon
- 29805 Bradleysloop
- 29806 Eviesobczak
- 29808 Youssoliman
- 29812 Aaronsolomon
- 29818 Aryosorayya
- 29824 Kalmančok
- 29825 Dunyazade
- 29827 Chrisbennett
- 29829 Engels
- 29832 Steinwehr
- 29834 Mariacallas
- 29837 Savage
- 29839 Russhoward
- 29842 Marilynsoper
- 29843 Brucesoper
- 29844 Millette
- 29845 Wykrota
- 29850 Tanakagyou
- 29852 Niralithakor
- 29858 Tlomak
- 29862 Savannahjoy
- 29869 Chiarabarbara
- 29873 Bertachini
- 29874 Rogerculver
- 29880 Andytran
- 29881 Tschopp
- 29886 Randytung
- 29895 Sarafaggi
- 29897 Kossen
- 29898 Richardnugent
- 29905 Kunitaka
- 29910 Segre
- 29950 Uppili
- 29952 Varghese
- 29959 Senevelling
- 29969 Amyvitha
- 29972 Chriswan
- 29975 Racheledelstein
- 29978 Arthurwang
- 29979 Wastyk
- 29980 Dougsimons
- 29982 Sarahwu
- 29983 Amyxu
- 29984 Zefferer
- 29986 Shunsuke
- 29987 Lazhang
- 29988 Davidezilli
- 29991 Dazimmerman
- 29992 Yasminezubi
- 29994 Zuoyu
- 29995 Arshavsky
back to top

== See also ==
- List of minor planet discoverers
- List of observatory codes
- Meanings of minor planet names § Index
