= Charles W. Juels =

American psychiatrist and amateur astronomer (1944–2009)

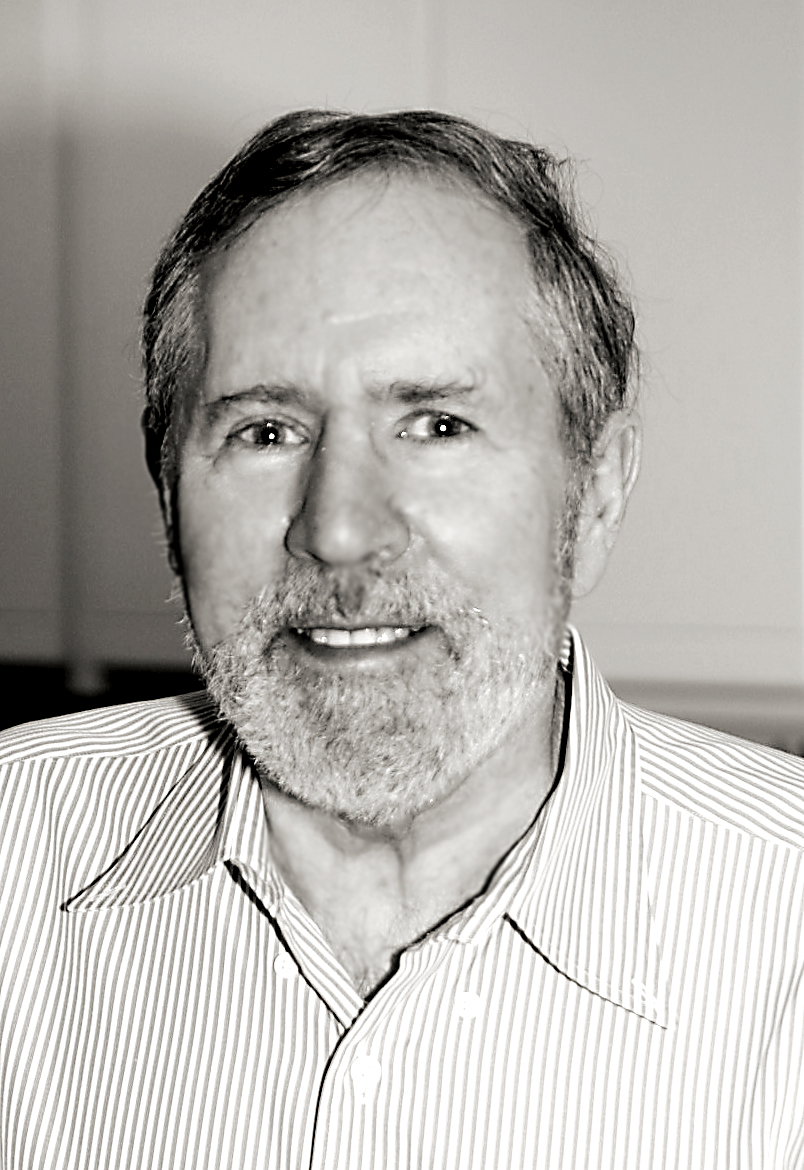
Charles Juels in 2008

Minor planets discovered: 475
see § List of discovered asteroids

Charles W. Juels (1944 – January 21, 2009) was an American amateur astronomer and psychiatrist by profession, who became a prolific discoverer of minor planets after his retirement.

Juels was born in New York City in 1944, and grew up in Cincinnati, Ohio. In 1969 he graduated from Cincinnati College of Medicine. After his retirement as a psychiatrist in Phoenix, Arizona, he began hunting for minor planets at his private Fountain Hills Observatory, in Fountain Hills, Arizona. He quickly became noted when he was credited with the discovery of 65 numbered minor planets during the first 18 months of his short career as a discoverer of minor planets.

In total, Juels is credited by the Minor Planet Center (MPC) with the discovery of 475 minor planets made between 1999 and 2003, and ranks as one of the world's top discoverers on the MPC charts.

In December 2002, Juels and Paulo R. Holvorcem won the "Harvard–Smithsonian 2003 Comet Award" for their joint charge-coupled device (CCD) electronic-camera discovery of C/2002 Y1, a near-parabolic comet.

He died on January 21, 2009, at the age of 64. The main-belt asteroid 20135 Juels, discovered by Paul G. Comba in 1996, was named in his honor. Naming citation was published on 9 March 2001 (M.P.C. 42368).

== List of discovered asteroids ==
As of 2016, the MPC credits Juels with the discovery of 475 numbered minor planets, discovered between 1999 and 2003. Several of his discoveries were named after people, in particular after astronomers such as 24105 Broughton and 24101 Cassini.

12128 Palermiti	13 September 1999	list
12574 LONEOS	4 September 1999	list
12929 Periboea	2 October 1999	list
12934 Bisque	11 October 1999	list
13421 Holvorcem	11 November 1999	list
13423 Bobwoolley	13 November 1999	list
13425 Waynebrown	15 November 1999	list
13820 Schwartz	1 November 1999	list
13830 ARLT	4 December 1999	list
13859 Fredtreasure	13 December 1999	list
13860 Neely	15 December 1999	list
14223 Dolby	3 December 1999	list
14238 d'Artagnan	31 December 1999	list
15522 Trueblood	14 December 1999	list
15606 Winer	11 April 2000	list
16135 Ivarsson	9 December 1999	list
16144 Korsten	15 December 1999	list
16157 Toastmasters	5 January 2000	list
16158 Monty	5 January 2000	list
17184 Carlrogers	13 November 1999	list
17185 Mcdavid	14 November 1999	list
17250 Genelucas	11 April 2000	list
18871 Grauer	11 November 1999	list
18877 Stevendodds	4 December 1999	list
(18879) 1999 XJ_{143}	15 December 1999	list

(19634) 1999 RG_{45}	14 September 1999	list
19719 Glasser	9 November 1999	list
19721 Wray	10 November 1999	list
19727 Allen	4 December 1999	list
19730 Machiavelli	7 December 1999	list
20524 Bustersikes	13 September 1999	list
(20663) 1999 UU_{2}	19 October 1999	list
(20676) 1999 VA_{7}	8 November 1999	list
(20679) 1999 VU_{9}	9 November 1999	list
(20680) 1999 VX_{9}	9 November 1999	list
(20682) 1999 VP_{23}	14 November 1999	list
(20714) 1999 XS_{36}	7 December 1999	list
(20721) 1999 XA_{105}	9 December 1999	list
(20728) 1999 XD_{143}	14 December 1999	list
(20729) 1999 XS_{143}	15 December 1999	list
20789 Hughgrant	28 September 2000	list
(20825) 2000 UN_{11}	26 October 2000	list
(20885) 2000 WD_{2}	18 November 2000	list
(20886) 2000 WE_{2}	18 November 2000	list
(20890) 2000 WN_{19}	25 November 2000	list
20898 Fountainhills	30 November 2000	list
21679 Bettypalermiti	8 September 1999	list
21683 Segal	9 September 1999	list
(21899) 1999 VU_{8}	8 November 1999	list
(21901) 1999 VZ_{11}	10 November 1999	list

(21902) 1999 VD_{12}	10 November 1999	list
21903 Wallace	10 November 1999	list
(21904) 1999 VV_{12}	11 November 1999	list
(21906) 1999 VH_{20}	11 November 1999	list
(21907) 1999 VM_{20}	11 November 1999	list
(21910) 1999 VT_{23}	14 November 1999	list
(21911) 1999 VW_{23}	14 November 1999	list
(21912) 1999 VL_{24}	15 November 1999	list
(21974) 1999 XV_{1}	3 December 1999	list
(21975) 1999 XR_{2}	4 December 1999	list
(21976) 1999 XV_{2}	4 December 1999	list
(21977) 1999 XW_{2}	4 December 1999	list
(21997) 1999 XP_{36}	7 December 1999	list
(21998) 1999 XH_{37}	7 December 1999	list
(22031) 1999 XA_{137}	14 December 1999	list
22870 Rosing	14 September 1999	list
22900 Trudie	11 October 1999	list
(22959) 1999 UY_{1}	16 October 1999	list
(22970) 1999 VT_{8}	8 November 1999	list
(22971) 1999 VY_{8}	9 November 1999	list
(22972) 1999 VR_{12}	11 November 1999	list
(22975) 1999 VR_{23}	14 November 1999	list
(22977) 1999 VF_{24}	15 November 1999	list
23030 Jimkennedy	4 December 1999	list
(23051) 1999 XF_{37}	7 December 1999	list

(23052) 1999 XK_{37}	7 December 1999	list
(23092) 1999 XT_{136}	14 December 1999	list
(23093) 1999 XW_{136}	14 December 1999	list
(23094) 1999 XF_{143}	15 December 1999	list
23110 Ericberne	2 January 2000	list
23111 Fritzperls	2 January 2000	list
23120 Paulallen	5 January 2000	list
(23256) 2000 YK_{17}	28 December 2000	list
24101 Cassini	9 November 1999	list
24102 Jacquescassini	9 November 1999	list
24103 Dethury	9 November 1999	list
24104 Vinissac	9 November 1999	list
24105 Broughton	9 November 1999	list
(24106) 1999 VA_{12}	10 November 1999	list
(24108) 1999 VL_{20}	11 November 1999	list
(24109) 1999 VO_{20}	11 November 1999	list
(24110) 1999 VP_{20}	11 November 1999	list
(24112) 1999 VO_{23}	14 November 1999	list
(24113) 1999 VQ_{23}	14 November 1999	list
(24114) 1999 VV_{23}	14 November 1999	list
(24115) 1999 VH_{24}	15 November 1999	list
(24116) 1999 VK_{24}	15 November 1999	list
(24177) 1999 XJ_{7}	4 December 1999	list
(24178) 1999 XL_{7}	4 December 1999	list
(24179) 1999 XS_{7}	4 December 1999	list

(24196) 1999 XG_{37}	7 December 1999	list
(24247) 1999 XD_{105}	9 December 1999	list
(24258) 1999 XH_{127}	9 December 1999	list
(24264) 1999 XL_{143}	15 December 1999	list
24303 Michaelrice	16 December 1999	list
24304 Lynnrice	16 December 1999	list
(24476) 2000 WE_{68}	29 November 2000	list
(25338) 1999 RE_{2}	6 September 1999	list
(25398) 1999 VM_{12}	11 November 1999	list
25399 Vonnegut	11 November 1999	list
(25450) 1999 XQ_{7}	4 December 1999	list
(25529) 1999 XL_{127}	11 December 1999	list
(25535) 1999 XF_{144}	15 December 1999	list
(25536) 1999 XG_{144}	15 December 1999	list
(25599) 2000 AN	2 January 2000	list
(25627) 2000 AU_{50}	5 January 2000	list
(25891) 2000 WK_{9}	20 November 2000	list
(26387) 1999 TG_{2}	2 October 1999	list
(26443) 2000 AT_{50}	5 January 2000	list
(26614) 2000 GD_{4}	5 April 2000	list
(27259) 1999 XS_{136}	13 December 1999	list
28346 Kent	19 March 1999	list
(28431) 1999 XO_{136}	13 December 1999	list
(28649) 2000 GZ_{1}	4 April 2000	list
29750 Chleborad	8 February 1999	list

(29870) 1999 GV_{4}	11 April 1999	list
29980 Dougsimons	30 September 1999	list
(31603) 1999 GQ_{3}	10 April 1999	list
(31609) 1999 GT_{5}	15 April 1999	list
(33483) 1999 GW_{4}	11 April 1999	list
33529 Henden	19 April 1999	list
33544 Jerold	15 May 1999	list
33750 Davehiggins	6 September 1999	list
(33794) 1999 TR_{2}	2 October 1999	list
33799 Myra	19 October 1999	list
33800 Gross	8 November 1999	list
(33805) 1999 XQ_{36}	7 December 1999	list
(34588) 2000 TL	2 October 2000	list
(34754) 2001 QG_{111}	25 August 2001	list
(34839) 2001 SL_{263}	25 September 2001	list^{[A]}
(36237) 1999 VX_{11}	10 November 1999	list
(36292) 2000 GX_{122}	11 April 2000	list
(37190) 2000 WC_{63}	28 November 2000	list
(37424) 2001 YA_{3}	19 December 2001	list
(37425) 2001 YM_{3}	19 December 2001	list
38454 Boroson	2 October 1999	list
(38459) 1999 TX_{12}	10 October 1999	list
(38528) 1999 UL_{4}	31 October 1999	list
(38543) 1999 VW_{9}	9 November 1999	list
(38582) 1999 XE_{37}	7 December 1999	list

(39369) 2002 CE_{13}	8 February 2002	list
(40745) 1999 TN_{2}	2 October 1999	list
(40746) 1999 TP_{2}	2 October 1999	list
(40760) 1999 TH_{11}	9 October 1999	list
(41044) 1999 VW_{6}	8 November 1999	list
(41045) 1999 VX_{6}	8 November 1999	list
(41046) 1999 VZ_{6}	8 November 1999	list
41049 Van Citters	9 November 1999	list
(41198) 1999 WB	16 November 1999	list
(41245) 1999 XJ_{37}	7 December 1999	list
(41305) 1999 XK_{143}	15 December 1999	list
(41437) 2000 GT_{122}	11 April 2000	list
(41669) 2000 TW_{28}	6 October 2000	list
(41672) 2000 TX_{36}	15 October 2000	list
(41686) 2000 UN_{16}	29 October 2000	list
(41791) 2000 WJ_{3}	19 November 2000	list
(41799) 2000 WL_{19}	25 November 2000	list
41800 Robwilliams	25 November 2000	list
42354 Kindleberger	12 February 2002	list^{[A]}
(42357) 2002 CS_{52}	12 February 2002	list
42365 Caligiuri	12 February 2002	list^{[A]}
(43023) 1999 VS_{12}	11 November 1999	list
(43024) 1999 VU_{12}	11 November 1999	list
(43026) 1999 VJ_{20}	11 November 1999	list
(43094) 1999 XK_{7}	4 December 1999	list

(43114) 1999 XR_{36}	7 December 1999	list
(43391) 2000 WT_{62}	28 November 2000	list
(43617) 2002 CL_{43}	12 February 2002	list^{[A]}
(44727) 1999 TZ_{14}	12 October 1999	list
(44896) 1999 VB_{12}	10 November 1999	list
(44897) 1999 VP_{12}	11 November 1999	list
(44905) 1999 VS_{22}	13 November 1999	list
(44907) 1999 VM_{24}	15 November 1999	list
(45034) 1999 XA_{2}	3 December 1999	list
(45035) 1999 XB_{2}	3 December 1999	list
(45072) 1999 XC_{37}	7 December 1999	list
(45163) 1999 XE_{127}	9 December 1999	list
(45164) 1999 XK_{127}	9 December 1999	list
(45173) 1999 XU_{136}	14 December 1999	list
(45875) 2000 WJ_{19}	25 November 2000	list
(46436) 2002 LH_{5}	6 June 2002	list^{[A]}
(46437) 2002 LL_{5}	6 June 2002	list^{[A]}
46441 Mikepenston	10 June 2002	list^{[A]}
46442 Keithtritton	12 June 2002	list^{[A]}
(47311) 1999 XN_{7}	4 December 1999	list
(47411) 1999 XZ_{136}	14 December 1999	list
(47470) 2000 AF	2 January 2000	list
(47471) 2000 AM	2 January 2000	list
(48299) 2002 LE_{35}	11 June 2002	list^{[A]}
48300 Kronk	11 June 2002	list^{[A]}

(48301) 2002 LL_{35}	12 June 2002	list^{[A]}
(49703) 1999 VT_{12}	11 November 1999	list
(49781) 1999 XT_{7}	4 December 1999	list
51983 Honig	19 September 2001	list^{[A]}
52005 Maik	8 February 2002	list^{[A]}
(53428) 1999 TD_{2}	2 October 1999	list
(53909) 2000 GC_{4}	5 April 2000	list
55331 Putzi	21 September 2001	list^{[A]}
(55395) 2001 SY_{285}	28 September 2001	list^{[A]}
55555 DNA	19 December 2001	list^{[A]}
(55568) 2002 CU_{15}	8 February 2002	list^{[A]}
(57031) 2000 VA	1 November 2000	list
57359 Robcrawford	1 September 2001	list
(57413) 2001 SE	16 September 2001	list^{[A]}
(57414) 2001 SJ	16 September 2001	list^{[A]}
(57418) 2001 SE_{4}	18 September 2001	list^{[A]}
(57421) 2001 SY_{8}	19 September 2001	list^{[A]}
(57508) 2001 SN_{270}	27 September 2001	list^{[A]}
(57517) 2001 SV_{285}	28 September 2001	list^{[A]}
(57518) 2001 SB_{286}	28 September 2001	list^{[A]}
(59365) 1999 EM	9 March 1999	list
(59426) 1999 GS_{5}	15 April 1999	list
59804 Dickjoyce	5 September 1999	list
(59998) 1999 TS_{2}	2 October 1999	list
(60178) 1999 VY_{6}	8 November 1999	list

(60181) 1999 VV_{9}	9 November 1999	list
(60187) 1999 VL_{23}	14 November 1999	list
(60290) 1999 XJ_{127}	9 December 1999	list
(60764) 2000 GV_{122}	11 April 2000	list
(62989) 2000 WC_{2}	17 November 2000	list
(62999) 2000 WK_{19}	25 November 2000	list
63032 Billschmitt	28 November 2000	list
(63883) 2001 SO	16 September 2001	list^{[A]}
(63892) 2001 SX_{4}	18 September 2001	list^{[A]}
(63896) 2001 SE_{9}	19 September 2001	list^{[A]}
(64031) 2001 SV_{169}	24 September 2001	list^{[A]}
(64060) 2001 SM_{263}	25 September 2001	list^{[A]}
64070 NEAT	24 September 2001	list^{[A]}
(64088) 2001 SX_{285}	28 September 2001	list^{[A]}
(64839) 2001 YJ_{3}	19 December 2001	list^{[A]}
(65099) 2002 CH_{13}	8 February 2002	list^{[A]}
65100 Birtwhistle	8 February 2002	list^{[A]}
(65101) 2002 CS_{15}	8 February 2002	list^{[A]}
(65148) 2002 CE_{117}	11 February 2002	list^{[A]}
(66275) 1999 JX_{8}	15 May 1999	list
(66660) 1999 TH_{2}	2 October 1999	list
(66844) 1999 VP	1 November 1999	list
(66850) 1999 VX_{8}	9 November 1999	list
(66851) 1999 VT_{9}	9 November 1999	list
(66855) 1999 VM_{22}	13 November 1999	list

(66947) 1999 XZ_{1}	3 December 1999	list
(66949) 1999 XO_{7}	4 December 1999	list
(66960) 1999 XN_{36}	7 December 1999	list
(66991) 1999 XE_{105}	9 December 1999	list
(67021) 1999 XG_{143}	15 December 1999	list
(67724) 2000 UP_{16}	29 October 2000	list
(68020) 2000 YJ_{17}	28 December 2000	list
68448 Sidneywolff	18 September 2001	list^{[A]}
(68632) 2002 CN_{7}	6 February 2002	list^{[A]}
(68635) 2002 CT_{15}	8 February 2002	list^{[A]}
(68645) 2002 CQ_{52}	11 February 2002	list^{[A]}
(70441) 1999 TH_{8}	7 October 1999	list
(70680) 1999 UN_{4}	31 October 1999	list
(70724) 1999 VS_{1}	4 November 1999	list
(70725) 1999 VH_{2}	5 November 1999	list
(70730) 1999 VN_{5}	6 November 1999	list
(70734) 1999 VS_{8}	8 November 1999	list
(70735) 1999 VZ_{8}	9 November 1999	list
(70746) 1999 VQ_{22}	13 November 1999	list
(70747) 1999 VT_{22}	13 November 1999	list
(70749) 1999 VS_{23}	14 November 1999	list
(70750) 1999 VJ_{24}	15 November 1999	list
(70953) 1999 XY_{1}	3 December 1999	list
(70999) 1999 XW_{36}	7 December 1999	list
71000 Hughdowns	7 December 1999	list

71001 Natspasoc	7 December 1999	list
(71096) 1999 XR_{136}	13 December 1999	list
(71102) 1999 XH_{144}	15 December 1999	list
(72036) 2000 XM_{44}	9 December 2000	list
72949 Colesanti	12 February 2002	list^{[A]}
74509 Gillett	22 March 1999	list
(74809) 1999 TE_{2}	2 October 1999	list
(74814) 1999 TD_{8}	5 October 1999	list
(74815) 1999 TG_{8}	7 October 1999	list
(74819) 1999 TG_{11}	9 October 1999	list
(74822) 1999 TA_{15}	12 October 1999	list
74824 Tarter	12 October 1999	list
(75014) 1999 UO_{4}	31 October 1999	list
(75067) 1999 VN_{12}	11 November 1999	list
(75077) 1999 VP_{22}	13 November 1999	list
(75079) 1999 VN_{24}	15 November 1999	list
(75304) 1999 XT_{36}	7 December 1999	list
(75305) 1999 XV_{36}	7 December 1999	list
(75307) 1999 XM_{37}	7 December 1999	list
(75409) 1999 XR_{104}	9 December 1999	list
(75454) 1999 XL_{144}	15 December 1999	list
75564 Audubon	2 January 2000	list
(76855) 2000 WD_{63}	28 November 2000	list
77870 MOTESS	16 September 2001	list^{[A]}
(77871) 2001 SC_{9}	19 September 2001	list^{[A]}

(78070) 2002 LG_{5}	6 June 2002	list^{[A]}
(78092) 2002 LD_{30}	10 June 2002	list^{[A]}
(78928) 2003 SR_{128}	20 September 2003	list^{[A]}
(80012) 1999 GT_{4}	11 April 1999	list
(80134) 1999 TE_{8}	5 October 1999	list
(80452) 2000 AK	2 January 2000	list
(80499) 2000 AR_{50}	5 January 2000	list
83360 Catalina	16 September 2001	list^{[A]}
(83361) 2001 SK	16 September 2001	list^{[A]}
(83373) 2001 SA_{9}	19 September 2001	list^{[A]}
(83374) 2001 SF_{9}	19 September 2001	list^{[A]}
(83597) 2001 SU_{263}	25 September 2001	list^{[A]}
(83604) 2001 SG_{270}	26 September 2001	list^{[A]}
(83605) 2001 SJ_{270}	26 September 2001	list^{[A]}
(83609) 2001 SE_{273}	24 September 2001	list^{[A]}
(83987) 2002 LR_{32}	11 June 2002	list^{[A]}
84342 Rubensdeazevedo	5 October 2002	list^{[A]}
(86203) 1999 TA_{2}	2 October 1999	list
(86204) 1999 TQ_{2}	2 October 1999	list
(86292) 1999 VY_{11}	10 November 1999	list
(86298) 1999 VO_{22}	13 November 1999	list
(86358) 1999 XB_{143}	14 December 1999	list
87954 Tomkaye	2 October 2000	list
(87965) 2000 TX_{28}	6 October 2000	list
(88097) 2000 WU_{62}	28 November 2000	list

(88704) 2001 SF	16 September 2001	list^{[A]}
(88796) 2001 SB_{116}	22 September 2001	list^{[A]}
(88880) 2001 SF_{270}	25 September 2001	list^{[A]}
(88886) 2001 SA_{286}	28 September 2001	list^{[A]}
(89831) 2002 CW_{4}	5 February 2002	list^{[A]}
89956 Leibacher	6 June 2002	list^{[A]}
(91284) 1999 FE_{7}	19 March 1999	list
(91590) 1999 TA_{3}	3 October 1999	list
(91596) 1999 TF_{11}	9 October 1999	list
(91896) 1999 VY_{9}	9 November 1999	list
(91897) 1999 VB_{10}	9 November 1999	list
(93763) 2000 WH_{19}	25 November 2000	list
(94058) 2000 YM_{17}	28 December 2000	list
(95220) 2002 CQ_{15}	8 February 2002	list^{[A]}
(95238) 2002 CH_{43}	12 February 2002	list^{[A]}
(95461) 2002 DZ_{2}	21 February 2002	list^{[A]}
(96632) 1999 GE_{1}	6 April 1999	list
(96872) 1999 TC_{2}	2 October 1999	list
(96874) 1999 TF_{8}	6 October 1999	list
(97031) 1999 UW_{2}	19 October 1999	list
(97209) 1999 XM_{36}	7 December 1999	list
(97210) 1999 XX_{36}	7 December 1999	list
(97211) 1999 XY_{36}	7 December 1999	list
(97276) 1999 XC_{143}	14 December 1999	list
(97277) 1999 XJ_{144}	15 December 1999	list

(97278) 1999 XM_{144}	15 December 1999	list
(98413) 2000 UO_{16}	29 October 2000	list
(98567) 2000 WG_{19}	25 November 2000	list
(99447) 2002 CX_{25}	10 February 2002	list^{[A]}
(99453) 2002 CW_{42}	12 February 2002	list^{[A]}
(99454) 2002 CZ_{42}	12 February 2002	list^{[A]}
(101967) 1999 RQ_{43}	13 September 1999	list
(102225) 1999 TU_{12}	10 October 1999	list
(102603) 1999 VP_{5}	6 November 1999	list
(102606) 1999 VA_{10}	9 November 1999	list
(102613) 1999 VQ_{20}	11 November 1999	list
(102885) 1999 XX_{1}	3 December 1999	list
(102928) 1999 XU_{36}	7 December 1999	list
(103059) 1999 XV_{136}	14 December 1999	list
(106189) 2000 UM_{11}	26 October 2000	list
(106481) 2000 WD_{19}	25 November 2000	list
(106535) 2000 WR_{62}	28 November 2000	list
(106536) 2000 WV_{62}	28 November 2000	list
(109657) 2001 RQ_{10}	11 September 2001	list
(109878) 2001 SG	16 September 2001	list^{[A]}
109879 Letelier	16 September 2001	list^{[A]}
(109883) 2001 SC_{4}	18 September 2001	list^{[A]}
(109886) 2001 SX_{8}	19 September 2001	list^{[A]}
(110302) 2001 SM_{270}	26 September 2001	list^{[A]}
(110325) 2001 SZ_{285}	28 September 2001	list^{[A]}

(111467) 2001 YQ_{2}	19 December 2001	list^{[A]}
(111699) 2002 CP_{15}	8 February 2002	list^{[A]}
(111722) 2002 CF_{43}	12 February 2002	list^{[A]}
(112245) 2002 LK_{5}	6 June 2002	list^{[A]}
(112276) 2002 LK_{24}	7 June 2002	list^{[A]}
(112292) 2002 LJ_{35}	12 June 2002	list^{[A]}
(112658) 2002 PQ_{86}	13 August 2002	list^{[A]}
(113618) 2002 TZ_{58}	4 October 2002	list^{[A]}
(115328) 2003 SR_{222}	28 September 2003	list^{[A]}
(118417) 1999 TW_{12}	10 October 1999	list
(118444) 1999 VK_{20}	11 November 1999	list
(119836) 2002 CS_{12}	8 February 2002	list^{[A]}
(119837) 2002 CY_{12}	8 February 2002	list^{[A]}
(123351) 2000 WF_{2}	18 November 2000	list
(123386) 2000 WW_{62}	28 November 2000	list
(124561) 2001 ST	17 September 2001	list^{[A]}
(124562) 2001 SU	17 September 2001	list^{[A]}
(126428) 2002 CU_{4}	5 February 2002	list^{[A]}
(126473) 2002 CA_{43}	12 February 2002	list^{[A]}
(127388) 2002 LF_{5}	6 June 2002	list^{[A]}
(129883) 1999 TO_{2}	2 October 1999	list
(130926) 2000 WF_{19}	25 November 2000	list
(131500) 2001 SK_{270}	26 September 2001	list^{[A]}
(131700) 2001 YN	17 December 2001	list^{[A]}
(131898) 2002 BB_{1}	19 January 2002	list^{[A]}

(131928) 2002 CV_{4}	5 February 2002	list^{[A]}
(131933) 2002 CC_{13}	8 February 2002	list^{[A]}
(131934) 2002 CF_{13}	8 February 2002	list^{[A]}
(131960) 2002 CB_{43}	12 February 2002	list^{[A]}
(131961) 2002 CD_{43}	12 February 2002	list^{[A]}
(131967) 2002 CR_{52}	12 February 2002	list^{[A]}
(134648) 1999 VN_{22}	13 November 1999	list
(135239) 2001 SH_{9}	19 September 2001	list^{[A]}
(135532) 2002 CR_{12}	7 February 2002	list^{[A]}
(135891) 2002 TU_{63}	4 October 2002	list^{[A]}
(137308) 1999 TF_{2}	2 October 1999	list
(140261) 2001 SJ_{263}	25 September 2001	list^{[A]}
(140265) 2001 SL_{270}	26 September 2001	list^{[A]}
(141433) 2002 CX_{12}	8 February 2002	list^{[A]}
(141443) 2002 CX_{42}	12 February 2002	list^{[A]}
(141911) 2002 PQ_{79}	13 August 2002	list^{[A]}
(142559) 2002 TO_{64}	5 October 2002	list^{[A]}
(145945) 1999 XF_{127}	9 December 1999	list
(146548) 2001 SU_{285}	28 September 2001	list^{[A]}
(149053) 2002 CW_{12}	8 February 2002	list^{[A]}
(149307) 2002 UQ_{1}	28 October 2002	list^{[A]}
(151292) 2002 CD_{13}	8 February 2002	list^{[A]}
(154027) 2002 CU_{42}	12 February 2002	list^{[A]}
(154028) 2002 CV_{42}	12 February 2002	list^{[A]}
(154302) 2002 UQ_{3}	29 October 2002	list^{[A]}

(156037) 2001 SQ	16 September 2001	list^{[A]}
(158432) 2002 CJ_{13}	8 February 2002	list^{[A]}
158520 Ricardoferreira	19 March 2002	list^{[A]}
(159631) 2002 CA_{13}	8 February 2002	list^{[A]}
(160590) 1999 RE_{28}	8 September 1999	list
(161006) 2002 EV_{2}	10 March 2002	list^{[A]}
(161073) 2002 LH_{35}	12 June 2002	list^{[A]}
(162353) 1999 YX	16 December 1999	list
(163341) 2002 LP_{32}	11 June 2002	list^{[A]}
(166372) 2002 LO_{32}	11 June 2002	list^{[A]}
(169517) 2002 EW_{2}	10 March 2002	list^{[A]}
(171575) 1999 VM_{5}	6 November 1999	list
(173308) 1999 VO_{5}	6 November 1999	list
(173309) 1999 VK_{22}	13 November 1999	list
(179808) 2002 TY_{69}	9 October 2002	list^{[A]}
(182836) 2002 CM_{7}	6 February 2002	list^{[A]}
(189693) 2001 SO_{270}	27 September 2001	list^{[A]}
(194732) 2001 YL_{3}	19 December 2001	list^{[A]}
(195009) 2002 CK_{13}	8 February 2002	list^{[A]}
(197208) 2003 WY_{7}	18 November 2003	list^{[A]}
(201161) 2002 LF_{35}	11 June 2002	list^{[A]}
(203532) 2002 CU_{12}	8 February 2002	list^{[A]}
(205081) 1999 TX_{14}	12 October 1999	list
(206141) 2002 TA_{59}	4 October 2002	list^{[A]}
(208919) 2002 UW_{1}	28 October 2002	list^{[A]}

(211045) 2002 CE_{43}	12 February 2002	list^{[A]}
(213314) 2001 SG_{9}	19 September 2001	list^{[A]}
(222753) 2002 CY_{25}	10 February 2002	list^{[A]}
(222925) 2002 LQ_{32}	11 June 2002	list^{[A]}
(223156) 2002 XP_{35}	7 December 2002	list^{[A]}
(230530) 2002 XO_{35}	5 December 2002	list^{[A]}
(240385) 2003 TV_{3}	1 October 2003	list^{[A]}
(241622) 1999 VL_{5}	6 November 1999	list
(247264) 2001 SW_{8}	19 September 2001	list^{[A]}
(250369) 2003 TY	4 October 2003	list^{[A]}
(258197) 2001 SW_{285}	28 September 2001	list^{[A]}
(286911) 2002 PR_{86}	13 August 2002	list^{[A]}
(287351) 2002 US_{1}	28 October 2002	list^{[A]}
(302078) 2000 WC_{147}	29 November 2000	list
(302367) 2002 CV_{12}	8 February 2002	list^{[A]}
(302376) 2002 CG_{43}	12 February 2002	list^{[A]}
(307101) 2002 CB_{13}	8 February 2002	list^{[A]}
(307389) 2002 TY_{10}	3 October 2002	list^{[A]}
(307439) 2002 UR_{1}	28 October 2002	list^{[A]}
(313115) 2000 YL_{17}	28 December 2000	list
(331506) 1999 VC_{12}	10 November 1999	list
(337120) 1999 TY_{14}	12 October 1999	list
(354312) 2002 UN_{1}	28 October 2002	list^{[A]}
(387691) 2002 UV_{1}	28 October 2002	list^{[A]}
(405154) 2002 TN_{64}	5 October 2002	list^{[A]}
Co-discovery made with:^{A} P. R. Holvorcem
