= 24101 Cassini =

Main-belt asteroid

Discovery
- Discovered by: C. W. Juels
- Discovery site: Fountain Hills Obs.
- Discovery date: 9 November 1999

Designations
- Named after: Giovanni Cassini (Italian astronomer)
- Alternative designations: 1999 VA_{9} · 1926 XH; 1926 YB · 1986 RS_{16} 1986 TM_{15}
- Minor planet category: main-belt · (middle) background

Orbital characteristics
- Epoch 4 September 2017 (JD 2458000.5)
- Uncertainty parameter 0
- Observation arc: 90.18 yr (32,937 days)
- Aphelion: 3.4620 AU
- Perihelion: 1.8278 AU
- Semi-major axis: 2.6449 AU
- Eccentricity: 0.3089
- Orbital period (sidereal): 4.30 yr (1,571 days)
- Mean anomaly: 29.894°
- Mean motion: 0° 13^{m} 44.76^{s} / day
- Inclination: 15.474°
- Longitude of ascending node: 176.58°
- Argument of perihelion: 255.81°

Physical characteristics
- Mean diameter: 7.051±0.352 km 11.05 km (calculated)
- Synodic rotation period: 3.986±0.001 h (Note: Durkee (2011): rotation period 3.986±0.001 hours with a brightness amplitude of 0.12 mag. Summary figures for (24101) Cassini at Collaborative Asteroid Lightcurve Link (CALL) and at Shed of Science (S.O.S.) Observatory)
- Geometric albedo: 0.10 (assumed); 0.2458±0.0529; 0.246±0.053
- Spectral type: S/C
- Absolute magnitude (H): 12.9 · 13.05±0.23

24101 Cassini (provisional designation 1999 VA_{9}) is an eccentric background asteroid from the middle region of the asteroid belt, approximately 7 kilometers in diameter. It was discovered on 9 November 1999, by American amateur astronomer Charles Juels at the Fountain Hills Observatory (678) in Arizona, United States. It was named after Italian–French astronomer Giovanni Cassini.

== Orbit and classification ==
Cassini is a non-family from the main belt's background population. It orbits the Sun in the central asteroid belt at a distance of 1.8–3.5 AU once every 4 years and 4 months (1,571 days). Its orbit has an eccentricity of 0.31 and an inclination of 15° with respect to the ecliptic.

In December 1926, the asteroid was first identified as 1926 XH at Heidelberg Observatory in Germany. The body's observation arc begins 7 years prior to its official discovery observation, with a precovery taken at La Silla Observatory in March 1992.

== Physical characteristics ==
=== Lightcurve ===
In February 2009, two rotational lightcurves of Cassini were obtained from photometric observations by Italian astronomer Silvano Casulli, and at the private Shed of Science Observatory (H39) in Minnesota, United States. Lightcurve analysis gave a well-defined, concurring rotation period of 3.986 hours with a brightness variation of 0.12 magnitude (U=3/-3).

=== Diameter and albedo ===
According to observations carried out by the NEOWISE mission of NASA's space-based Wide-field Infrared Survey Explorer, Cassini measures 7.051 kilometer in diameter and its surface has an albedo of 0.2458.

The Collaborative Asteroid Lightcurve Link assumes an albedo of 0.10 – a compromise value between the brighter stony (0.20) and darker carbonaceous (0.057) asteroids of the 2.6 to 2.7 AU-region of the asteroid belt – and correspondingly, calculates a larger diameter of 11.05 kilometers, as the lower a body's albedo (reflectivity), the larger its diameter for a given absolute magnitude (brightness).

== Naming ==
This minor planet was named in honor of Italian-born French astronomer Giovanni Cassini (1625–1712), who was the first director of the Paris Observatory from 1671 until his death. He discovered the four moons of Saturn – Iapetus, Rhea, Tethys and Dione – the major gap in its rings, known as Cassini Division, and was the first to write down observations of the zodiacal light. The Cassini–Huygens spacecraft is named after him and Christiaan Huygens.

The lunar and Martian craters Cassini are also named in his honor. The approved naming citation was published by the Minor Planet Center on 21 September 2002 (M.P.C. 46684).
