= 24105 Broughton =

Background asteroid

Discovery
- Discovered by: C. W. Juels
- Discovery site: Fountain Hills Obs.
- Discovery date: 9 November 1999

Designations
- Named after: John Broughton (Australian astronomer)
- Alternative designations: 1999 VE_{10} · 1997 BV_{6}
- Minor planet category: main-belt · (inner) background

Orbital characteristics
- Epoch 23 March 2018 (JD 2458200.5)
- Uncertainty parameter 0
- Observation arc: 20.97 yr (7,659 d)
- Aphelion: 2.4364 AU
- Perihelion: 2.2457 AU
- Semi-major axis: 2.3410 AU
- Eccentricity: 0.0407
- Orbital period (sidereal): 3.58 yr (1,308 d)
- Mean anomaly: 340.18°
- Mean motion: 0° 16^{m} 30.72^{s} / day
- Inclination: 7.3496°
- Longitude of ascending node: 310.72°
- Argument of perihelion: 164.63°

Physical characteristics
- Mean diameter: 3.65 km (calculated)
- Synodic rotation period: 15.9442±0.0250 h
- Geometric albedo: 0.24 (assumed)
- Spectral type: S
- Absolute magnitude (H): 13.907±0.005 (R); 14.0; 14.36

24105 Broughton (provisional designation 1999 VE_{10}) is a background asteroid from the inner regions of the asteroid belt, approximately 3.7 kilometers (2.3 miles) in diameter. The assumed S-type asteroid was discovered on 9 November 1999, by American amateur astronomer Charles W. Juels at the Fountain Hills Observatory (678) in Arizona, United States. It has a rotation period of 15.9 hours and was named after Australian amateur astronomer John Broughton.

== Orbit and classification ==
Broughton is non-family asteroid from the main belt's background population, located near the region occupied by the Flora family, one of the largest clans of stony asteroids. It orbits the Sun in the inner asteroid belt at a distance of 2.2–2.4 AU once every 3 years and 7 months (1,308 days; semi-major axis of 2.34 AU). Its orbit has an eccentricity of 0.04 and an inclination of 7° with respect to the ecliptic.

The asteroid was first observed as 1997 BV_{6} at the Japanese Tajimi Observatory (901) in January 1997, where its observation arc begins in the following month, about 2 years prior to the asteroid's official discovery observation at Fountain Hills.

== Naming ==
This minor planet was named in honor of Australian amateur astronomer John Broughton (born 1952), a prolific discoverer of minor planets who received a "Shoemaker NEO Grant" in 2002. The approved naming citation was published by the Minor Planet Center on 26 November 2004 (M.P.C. 53176).

== Physical characteristics ==
=== Lightcurves ===
In October 2013, a rotational lightcurve of Broughton was obtained from photometric observations in the R-band by astronomers at the Palomar Transient Factory in California. Lightcurve analysis gave a rotation period of 15.9442 hours with a brightness variation of 0.34 magnitude (U=2).

=== Diameter and albedo ===
The Collaborative Asteroid Lightcurve Link assumes an albedo of 0.24 – derived from 8 Flora, the family's largest member and namesake – and calculates a diameter of 3.65 kilometers with an absolute magnitude of 14.36.
