= Yocum =

Yocum is a surname. Notable people with the surname include:

- Frank A. Yocum, American football player and coach
- Lewis Yocum, American orthopedic surgeon
- Matt Yocum (born 1968), American motorsports reporter
- Seth H. Yocum, American politician
- Troy Yocum, American Iraq War veteran
- Vern Yocum, American copyist and librarian for musicians

== Places ==
- 24021 Yocum, main-belt asteroid
- Yocum, Arkansas
- Yocum Creek, Arkansas
- Yocum Falls (Clackamas County, Oregon)
- North Yocum Township, Carroll County, Arkansas
- South Yocum Township, Carroll County, Arkansas

== See also ==
- Yoakam
- Yoakum (disambiguation)
