= Farewell, Arkansas =

Community in Arkansas, US

Coordinates: 36°23′32″N 93°22′11″W

Farewell is a community in Carroll County in northwest Arkansas, United States. The community is on Arkansas Highway 311, northeast of Green Forest. The community of Denver lies on the banks of Long Creek approximately three miles to the east. The community of Yocum is three miles northwest on Arkansas Highway 103.

A school was constructed of logs at the location in 1870. A community meeting was held to determine a name. However, no agreement was reached and a member walked out in disgust saying "farewell" and the community members decided that would be the name.
