= Elyu-Ene =

Elyu-Ene may refer to:

- 24701 Elyu-Ene, Hildian asteroid
- Lena River, by its original name in the Ewenki language
