= Yoakum =

== People ==
- Yoakum (surname)

== Places ==
- Yoakum, Texas
- Yoakum County, Texas

== See also ==
- Yoakam
- Yocum
