= Yocum Creek =

Yokum Creek

Location
- Country: United States
- State: Arkansas
- County: Carroll

Physical characteristics
- Source
  - coordinates: 36°17′57″N 93°27′20″W
- Mouth
  - coordinates: 36°27′53″N 93°18′31″W
  - elevation: 915 ft (279 m)

Yocum Creek is a stream in Carroll County in northwest Arkansas. It is a tributary to the Long Creek branch of Table Rock Lake.

The stream headwaters arise on a mountainside about two miles south of Green Forest. The stream flows north roughly parallel to Arkansas Highway 103 and along the west part of Green Forest where it passes under U.S. Route 62. It continues to the north and northeast passing the community of Yocum. It meanders to the north and northeast to enter Table Rock Lake in the northeast corner of Carroll County. Prior to the flooding of Table Rock Lake the stream confluence with Long Creek was just north of the now submerged community of Enon at an elevation just below 900 feet.

John Yocum moved from southern Missouri into the area around Yocum in 1836 and built a mill on the creek that now bears his name. The mill was destroyed by a fire in the 1920s.
