= Denver, Arkansas =

Community in Arkansas, United States

Coordinates: 36°23′33″N 93°18′54″W

Denver is a community in Carroll County in northwest Arkansas, United States. Denver is located on the east bank of Long Creek near the confluence of Dry Creek with Long Creek and approximately one mile west of the Carroll-Boone county line. The community is accessed by county road from Arkansas Highway 396, which passes about 1.5 miles to the north. Farewell is about three miles to the west.

Malachi Reeves ran a mill on Long Creek in 1836 and a post office was in operation from 1884 until the 1960s.
