= Claudio Casacci =

Italian space scientist and amateur astronomer

Minor planets discovered: 8
see § List of discovered minor planets

Claudio Casacci (born 1958) is an Italian space scientist and amateur astronomer, who is credited by the Minor Planet Center with the discovery of several main-belt asteroids between 1995 and 1998. He works at Thales Alenia Space in Turin, Italy.

In 1995, the outer main-belt asteroid 4814 Casacci was named in his honour (M.P.C. 25229).

== List of discovered minor planets ==
All co-discoveries were made with: ^{A} M. Tombelli

15968 Waltercugno	27 February 1998	list^{[A]}
18627 Rogerbonnet	27 February 1998	list^{[A]}
19331 Stefanovitale	4 December 1996	list^{[A]}
20194 Ilarialocantore	30 January 1997	list^{[A]}

21256 Robertobattiston	14 February 1996	list^{[A]}
24856 Messidoro	15 January 1996	list^{[A]}
24890 Amaliafinzi	4 December 1996	list^{[A]}
43881 Cerreto	25 February 1995	list^{[A]}

== See also ==
- List of minor planet discoverers § C. Casacci
