= Yoakum (surname) =

Yoakum is a surname. Notable people with the surname include:

- Benjamin Franklin Yoakum (1859–1929), American railroad executive
- Charles Henderson Yoakum (1849–1909), U.S. Representative from Texas.
- Joseph Elmer Yoakum (1890–1972), self-taught artist of African-American and Native American descent
- Delmer J. Yoakum (1915–1996), American artist
- Henderson King Yoakum (1810–1856), Texas historian
