= 24260 Kriváň =

Main-belt asteroid

Discovery
- Discovered by: P. Kušnirák
- Discovery site: Ondřejov Obs.
- Discovery date: 13 December 1999

Designations
- Named after: Kriváň (Slovak mountain)
- Alternative designations: 1999 XW_{127} · 1982 YG_{1}
- Minor planet category: main-belt · Eunomia

Orbital characteristics
- Epoch 4 September 2017 (JD 2458000.5)
- Uncertainty parameter 0
- Observation arc: 40.95 yr (14,956 days)
- Aphelion: 2.9352 AU
- Perihelion: 2.2617 AU
- Semi-major axis: 2.5985 AU
- Eccentricity: 0.1296
- Orbital period (sidereal): 4.19 yr (1,530 days)
- Mean anomaly: 120.34°
- Mean motion: 0° 14^{m} 7.08^{s} / day
- Inclination: 14.283°
- Longitude of ascending node: 43.060°
- Argument of perihelion: 31.066°

Physical characteristics
- Dimensions: 8.320±0.189 km 8.36 km (calculated)
- Synodic rotation period: 3.318±0.001 h
- Geometric albedo: 0.21 (assumed); 0.2798±0.0414; 0.280±0.041
- Spectral type: S
- Absolute magnitude (H): 12.4 · 12.7 · 13.16±0.73

24260 Kriváň (provisional designation 1999 XW_{127}) is a stony Eunomian asteroid from the middle region of the asteroid belt, approximately 8 kilometers in diameter. It was discovered by Slovak astronomer Peter Kušnirák at the Czech Ondřejov Observatory on 13 December 1999, and named after the Kriváň mountain peak in Slovakia.

== Orbit and classification ==
The asteroid is a member of the Eunomia family, a large group of stony S-type asteroids and the most prominent family in the intermediate main-belt. It orbits the Sun in the central main-belt at a distance of 2.3–2.9 AU once every 4 years and 2 months (1,530 days). Its orbit has an eccentricity of 0.13 and an inclination of 14° with respect to the ecliptic. The first precovery was taken at the Australian Siding Spring Observatory in 1976, extending the asteroid's observation arc by 23 years prior to its discovery.

== Physical characteristics ==
In December 2011, a rotational light curve was obtained for this asteroid from photometric observation by U.S. astronomer James W. Brinsfield at the Via Observatory in Thousand Oaks, California. It gave a well-defined rotation period of 3.318±0.001 hours with a brightness variation of 0.42 in magnitude (U=3).

According to the survey carried out by the NEOWISE mission of NASA's Wide-field Infrared Survey Explorer, the asteroid measures 8.3 kilometers in diameter and its surface has an albedo of 0.28, while the Collaborative Asteroid Lightcurve Link assumes a standard albedo of 0.21 – derived from 15 Eunomia, the family's largest member and namesake – and calculates a diameter of 8.4 kilometers with an absolute magnitude of 12.7.

== Naming ==
This minor planet was named after the Kriváň mountain (2,494 metres (8,182 ft)), located in the High Tatras of Slovakia. It is considered to be the country's most beautiful peak and one of its national symbols. The approved naming citation was published by the Minor Planet Center on 4 August 2001 (M.P.C. 43194).
