= List of minor planets: 24001–25000 =

The following is a partial list of minor planets, running from minor-planet number 24001 through 25000, inclusive. The primary data for this and other partial lists is based on JPL's "Small-Body Orbital Elements" and data available from the Minor Planet Center. Critical list information is also provided by the MPC, unless otherwise specified from Lowell Observatory. A detailed description of the table's columns and additional sources are given on the main page including a complete list of every page in this series, and a statistical break-up on the dynamical classification of minor planets.

Also see the summary list of all named bodies in numerical and alphabetical order, and the corresponding naming citations for the number range of this particular list. New namings may only be added to this list after official publication, as the preannouncement of names is condemned by the Working Group for Small Bodies Nomenclature of the International Astronomical Union.

Near-Earth obj.	MBA (inner)	MBA (outer)	Centaur
Mars-crosser	MBA (middle)	Jupiter trojan	Trans-Neptunian obj.
Unclassified

== 24001–24100 ==
Designation			Discovery			Properties		Ref
Permanent	Provisional	Named after	Date	Site	Discoverer(s)	Category	Diam.	Ref
24001	1999 RK_{34}	—	September 10, 1999	Višnjan Observatory	K. Korlević	·	2.3 km	MPC; JPL
24002	1999 RR_{35}	—	September 11, 1999	Višnjan Observatory	K. Korlević	·	4.8 km	MPC; JPL
24003	1999 RG_{36}	—	September 12, 1999	Višnjan Observatory	K. Korlević	·	5.3 km	MPC; JPL
24004	1999 RQ_{57}	—	September 7, 1999	Socorro	LINEAR	MAR	5.3 km	MPC; JPL
24005 Eddieozawa	1999 RB_{59}	Eddieozawa	September 7, 1999	Socorro	LINEAR	·	4.4 km	MPC; JPL
24006	1999 RQ_{86}	—	September 7, 1999	Socorro	LINEAR	·	4.6 km	MPC; JPL
24007	1999 RE_{91}	—	September 7, 1999	Socorro	LINEAR	NYS	1.6 km	MPC; JPL
24008	1999 RF_{94}	—	September 7, 1999	Socorro	LINEAR	·	2.3 km	MPC; JPL
24009	1999 RX_{98}	—	September 7, 1999	Socorro	LINEAR	PHO	2.8 km	MPC; JPL
24010 Stovall	1999 RR_{104}	Stovall	September 8, 1999	Socorro	LINEAR	·	1.8 km	MPC; JPL
24011	1999 RR_{109}	—	September 8, 1999	Socorro	LINEAR	·	3.7 km	MPC; JPL
24012	1999 RO_{111}	—	September 9, 1999	Socorro	LINEAR	EUN	3.2 km	MPC; JPL
24013	1999 RR_{113}	—	September 9, 1999	Socorro	LINEAR	·	7.1 km	MPC; JPL
24014	1999 RB_{118}	—	September 9, 1999	Socorro	LINEAR	EUN	6.6 km	MPC; JPL
24015 Pascalepinner	1999 RK_{123}	Pascalepinner	September 9, 1999	Socorro	LINEAR	·	2.5 km	MPC; JPL
24016	1999 RK_{126}	—	September 9, 1999	Socorro	LINEAR	(5)	3.6 km	MPC; JPL
24017	1999 RN_{126}	—	September 9, 1999	Socorro	LINEAR	·	3.3 km	MPC; JPL
24018	1999 RU_{134}	—	September 9, 1999	Socorro	LINEAR	L5	24 km	MPC; JPL
24019 Jeremygasper	1999 RX_{137}	Jeremygasper	September 9, 1999	Socorro	LINEAR	V	2.1 km	MPC; JPL
24020	1999 RV_{142}	—	September 9, 1999	Socorro	LINEAR	·	3.6 km	MPC; JPL
24021 Yocum	1999 RT_{143}	Yocum	September 9, 1999	Socorro	LINEAR	V · slow	2.3 km	MPC; JPL
24022	1999 RA_{144}	—	September 9, 1999	Socorro	LINEAR	L5	21 km	MPC; JPL
24023	1999 RX_{147}	—	September 9, 1999	Socorro	LINEAR	·	6.6 km	MPC; JPL
24024 Lynnejohnson	1999 RY_{159}	Lynnejohnson	September 9, 1999	Socorro	LINEAR	·	3.5 km	MPC; JPL
24025 Kimwallin	1999 RV_{164}	Kimwallin	September 9, 1999	Socorro	LINEAR	·	3.1 km	MPC; JPL
24026 Pusateri	1999 RN_{175}	Pusateri	September 9, 1999	Socorro	LINEAR	·	2.3 km	MPC; JPL
24027 Downs	1999 RP_{176}	Downs	September 9, 1999	Socorro	LINEAR	·	5.8 km	MPC; JPL
24028 Veronicaduys	1999 RP_{182}	Veronicaduys	September 9, 1999	Socorro	LINEAR	·	3.6 km	MPC; JPL
24029	1999 RT_{198}	—	September 10, 1999	Socorro	LINEAR	·	5.7 km	MPC; JPL
24030	1999 RT_{206}	—	September 8, 1999	Socorro	LINEAR	·	8.5 km	MPC; JPL
24031	1999 RV_{207}	—	September 8, 1999	Socorro	LINEAR	·	4.0 km	MPC; JPL
24032 Aimeemcarthy	1999 RO_{212}	Aimeemcarthy	September 8, 1999	Socorro	LINEAR	·	4.7 km	MPC; JPL
24033	1999 RY_{238}	—	September 8, 1999	Catalina	CSS	·	4.1 km	MPC; JPL
24034	1999 SF_{2}	—	September 22, 1999	Višnjan Observatory	K. Korlević	NYS	2.7 km	MPC; JPL
24035	1999 SJ_{2}	—	September 22, 1999	Višnjan Observatory	K. Korlević	·	9.4 km	MPC; JPL
24036	1999 SP_{4}	—	September 29, 1999	Višnjan Observatory	K. Korlević	·	8.8 km	MPC; JPL
24037	1999 SB_{7}	—	September 29, 1999	Socorro	LINEAR	·	3.9 km	MPC; JPL
24038	1999 SL_{8}	—	September 29, 1999	Socorro	LINEAR	·	4.3 km	MPC; JPL
24039	1999 SS_{8}	—	September 29, 1999	Socorro	LINEAR	·	3.9 km	MPC; JPL
24040	1999 ST_{8}	—	September 29, 1999	Socorro	LINEAR	·	3.7 km	MPC; JPL
24041	1999 SO_{10}	—	September 30, 1999	Socorro	LINEAR	·	3.1 km	MPC; JPL
24042	1999 SY_{11}	—	September 30, 1999	Catalina	CSS	H	1.7 km	MPC; JPL
24043	1999 SD_{13}	—	September 30, 1999	Socorro	LINEAR	·	3.5 km	MPC; JPL
24044 Caballo	1999 SL_{17}	Caballo	September 30, 1999	Socorro	LINEAR	V	2.1 km	MPC; JPL
24045 Unruh	1999 ST_{18}	Unruh	September 30, 1999	Socorro	LINEAR	·	3.6 km	MPC; JPL
24046 Malovany	1999 TX_{3}	Malovany	October 2, 1999	Ondřejov	L. Kotková	·	2.2 km	MPC; JPL
24047 Latorredelsole	1999 TD_{6}	Latorredelsole	October 6, 1999	Stroncone	Santa Lucia	·	3.8 km	MPC; JPL
24048 Pedroduque	1999 TL_{11}	Pedroduque	October 10, 1999	Ametlla de Mar	J. Nomen	PHO	4.1 km	MPC; JPL
24049	1999 TZ_{18}	—	October 15, 1999	Višnjan Observatory	K. Korlević	·	2.9 km	MPC; JPL
24050	1999 TZ_{25}	—	October 3, 1999	Socorro	LINEAR	·	2.2 km	MPC; JPL
24051 Hadinger	1999 TW_{28}	Hadinger	October 4, 1999	Socorro	LINEAR	·	1.7 km	MPC; JPL
24052 Nguyen	1999 TC_{33}	Nguyen	October 4, 1999	Socorro	LINEAR	·	3.1 km	MPC; JPL
24053 Shinichiro	1999 TS_{36}	Shinichiro	October 12, 1999	Anderson Mesa	LONEOS	·	2.0 km	MPC; JPL
24054	1999 TZ_{37}	—	October 1, 1999	Catalina	CSS	·	2.2 km	MPC; JPL
24055	1999 TX_{71}	—	October 9, 1999	Kitt Peak	Spacewatch	·	5.8 km	MPC; JPL
24056	1999 TT_{73}	—	October 10, 1999	Kitt Peak	Spacewatch	NYS	2.6 km	MPC; JPL
24057	1999 TG_{76}	—	October 10, 1999	Kitt Peak	Spacewatch	·	2.4 km	MPC; JPL
24058	1999 TR_{89}	—	October 2, 1999	Socorro	LINEAR	·	2.5 km	MPC; JPL
24059 Halverson	1999 TE_{94}	Halverson	October 2, 1999	Socorro	LINEAR	·	2.3 km	MPC; JPL
24060 Schimenti	1999 TQ_{100}	Schimenti	October 2, 1999	Socorro	LINEAR	·	2.5 km	MPC; JPL
24061	1999 TS_{100}	—	October 2, 1999	Socorro	LINEAR	·	5.5 km	MPC; JPL
24062 Hardister	1999 TF_{112}	Hardister	October 4, 1999	Socorro	LINEAR	·	2.3 km	MPC; JPL
24063 Nanwoodward	1999 TV_{116}	Nanwoodward	October 4, 1999	Socorro	LINEAR	·	3.5 km	MPC; JPL
24064	1999 TK_{119}	—	October 4, 1999	Socorro	LINEAR	·	2.2 km	MPC; JPL
24065 Barbfriedman	1999 TW_{120}	Barbfriedman	October 4, 1999	Socorro	LINEAR	·	4.8 km	MPC; JPL
24066 Eriksorensen	1999 TE_{123}	Eriksorensen	October 4, 1999	Socorro	LINEAR	·	3.0 km	MPC; JPL
24067	1999 TW_{152}	—	October 7, 1999	Socorro	LINEAR	(5)	3.3 km	MPC; JPL
24068 Simonsen	1999 TR_{156}	Simonsen	October 8, 1999	Socorro	LINEAR	·	3.6 km	MPC; JPL
24069 Barbarapener	1999 TY_{172}	Barbarapener	October 10, 1999	Socorro	LINEAR	·	2.6 km	MPC; JPL
24070 Toniwest	1999 TH_{173}	Toniwest	October 10, 1999	Socorro	LINEAR	NYS	3.1 km	MPC; JPL
24071	1999 TS_{174}	—	October 10, 1999	Socorro	LINEAR	·	2.0 km	MPC; JPL
24072	1999 TL_{192}	—	October 12, 1999	Socorro	LINEAR	·	4.4 km	MPC; JPL
24073	1999 TB_{198}	—	October 12, 1999	Socorro	LINEAR	·	2.2 km	MPC; JPL
24074 Thomasjohnson	1999 TE_{198}	Thomasjohnson	October 12, 1999	Socorro	LINEAR	·	3.8 km	MPC; JPL
24075	1999 TY_{209}	—	October 14, 1999	Socorro	LINEAR	·	7.2 km	MPC; JPL
24076	1999 TL_{223}	—	October 2, 1999	Socorro	LINEAR	·	15 km	MPC; JPL
24077	1999 TD_{233}	—	October 3, 1999	Socorro	LINEAR	H	2.3 km	MPC; JPL
24078	1999 TJ_{240}	—	October 4, 1999	Catalina	CSS	·	2.0 km	MPC; JPL
24079	1999 TH_{246}	—	October 8, 1999	Catalina	CSS	·	7.7 km	MPC; JPL
24080	1999 TU_{247}	—	October 8, 1999	Catalina	CSS	·	9.1 km	MPC; JPL
24081	1999 TY_{247}	—	October 8, 1999	Catalina	CSS	·	3.0 km	MPC; JPL
24082	1999 TD_{248}	—	October 8, 1999	Catalina	CSS	·	3.1 km	MPC; JPL
24083	1999 TM_{283}	—	October 9, 1999	Socorro	LINEAR	·	2.8 km	MPC; JPL
24084 Teresaswiger	1999 TG_{289}	Teresaswiger	October 10, 1999	Socorro	LINEAR	·	2.0 km	MPC; JPL
24085	1999 TM_{291}	—	October 10, 1999	Socorro	LINEAR	·	2.2 km	MPC; JPL
24086	1999 UT	—	October 16, 1999	Višnjan Observatory	K. Korlević	·	3.5 km	MPC; JPL
24087 Ciambetti	1999 UT_{3}	Ciambetti	October 27, 1999	Dossobuono	Madonna di Dossobuono	·	2.3 km	MPC; JPL
24088	1999 UQ_{5}	—	October 29, 1999	Catalina	CSS	PAD	4.2 km	MPC; JPL
24089	1999 UW_{7}	—	October 29, 1999	Catalina	CSS	·	2.5 km	MPC; JPL
24090 Grindavík	1999 UY_{8}	Grindavík	October 29, 1999	Catalina	CSS	V	2.1 km	MPC; JPL
24091	1999 UC_{9}	—	October 29, 1999	Catalina	CSS	·	2.5 km	MPC; JPL
24092	1999 UU_{13}	—	October 29, 1999	Catalina	CSS	·	3.8 km	MPC; JPL
24093 Tomoyamaguchi	1999 UM_{38}	Tomoyamaguchi	October 29, 1999	Anderson Mesa	LONEOS	·	4.5 km	MPC; JPL
24094	1999 UN_{60}	—	October 31, 1999	Socorro	LINEAR	PHO	5.2 km	MPC; JPL
24095	1999 VN	—	November 2, 1999	Zeno	T. Stafford	KOR	4.5 km	MPC; JPL
24096	1999 VQ_{2}	—	November 5, 1999	High Point	D. K. Chesney	V	3.3 km	MPC; JPL
24097	1999 VB_{6}	—	November 5, 1999	Oizumi	T. Kobayashi	·	3.3 km	MPC; JPL
24098	1999 VC_{7}	—	November 7, 1999	Višnjan Observatory	K. Korlević	PHO	5.5 km	MPC; JPL
24099	1999 VF_{8}	—	November 8, 1999	Višnjan Observatory	K. Korlević	·	10 km	MPC; JPL
24100	1999 VH_{8}	—	November 8, 1999	Višnjan Observatory	K. Korlević	EOS · slow	8.5 km	MPC; JPL

== 24101–24200 ==
back to top

Designation			Discovery			Properties		Ref
Permanent	Provisional	Named after	Date	Site	Discoverer(s)	Category	Diam.	Ref
24101 Cassini	1999 VA_{9}	Cassini	November 9, 1999	Fountain Hills	C. W. Juels	·	7.1 km	MPC; JPL
24102 Jacquescassini	1999 VD_{9}	Jacquescassini	November 9, 1999	Fountain Hills	C. W. Juels	EUN	4.7 km	MPC; JPL
24103 Dethury	1999 VS_{9}	Dethury	November 9, 1999	Fountain Hills	C. W. Juels	·	4.9 km	MPC; JPL
24104 Vinissac	1999 VZ_{9}	Vinissac	November 9, 1999	Fountain Hills	C. W. Juels	·	4.2 km	MPC; JPL
24105 Broughton	1999 VE_{10}	Broughton	November 9, 1999	Fountain Hills	C. W. Juels	·	5.9 km	MPC; JPL
24106	1999 VA_{12}	—	November 10, 1999	Fountain Hills	C. W. Juels	moon	3.6 km	MPC; JPL
24107	1999 VS_{19}	—	November 12, 1999	Zeno	T. Stafford	slow	16 km	MPC; JPL
24108	1999 VL_{20}	—	November 11, 1999	Fountain Hills	C. W. Juels	·	5.0 km	MPC; JPL
24109	1999 VO_{20}	—	November 11, 1999	Fountain Hills	C. W. Juels	MAR	6.0 km	MPC; JPL
24110	1999 VP_{20}	—	November 11, 1999	Fountain Hills	C. W. Juels	·	4.3 km	MPC; JPL
24111	1999 VY_{22}	—	November 13, 1999	High Point	D. K. Chesney	·	5.3 km	MPC; JPL
24112	1999 VO_{23}	—	November 14, 1999	Fountain Hills	C. W. Juels	·	5.4 km	MPC; JPL
24113	1999 VQ_{23}	—	November 14, 1999	Fountain Hills	C. W. Juels	·	3.7 km	MPC; JPL
24114	1999 VV_{23}	—	November 14, 1999	Fountain Hills	C. W. Juels	·	5.0 km	MPC; JPL
24115	1999 VH_{24}	—	November 15, 1999	Fountain Hills	C. W. Juels	V	3.2 km	MPC; JPL
24116	1999 VK_{24}	—	November 15, 1999	Fountain Hills	C. W. Juels	NYS	3.7 km	MPC; JPL
24117	1999 VQ_{26}	—	November 3, 1999	Socorro	LINEAR	MAS	2.1 km	MPC; JPL
24118 Babazadeh	1999 VX_{28}	Babazadeh	November 3, 1999	Socorro	LINEAR	·	4.7 km	MPC; JPL
24119 Katherinrose	1999 VB_{32}	Katherinrose	November 3, 1999	Socorro	LINEAR	·	2.3 km	MPC; JPL
24120 Jeremyblum	1999 VR_{33}	Jeremyblum	November 3, 1999	Socorro	LINEAR	·	8.3 km	MPC; JPL
24121 Achandran	1999 VV_{33}	Achandran	November 3, 1999	Socorro	LINEAR	KOR	3.5 km	MPC; JPL
24122	1999 VW_{34}	—	November 3, 1999	Socorro	LINEAR	·	6.3 km	MPC; JPL
24123 Timothychang	1999 VU_{35}	Timothychang	November 3, 1999	Socorro	LINEAR	·	4.2 km	MPC; JPL
24124 Dozier	1999 VH_{36}	Dozier	November 3, 1999	Socorro	LINEAR	·	5.7 km	MPC; JPL
24125 Sapphozoe	1999 VS_{36}	Sapphozoe	November 3, 1999	Socorro	LINEAR	KOR	3.1 km	MPC; JPL
24126 Gudjonson	1999 VC_{49}	Gudjonson	November 3, 1999	Socorro	LINEAR	·	8.1 km	MPC; JPL
24127	1999 VZ_{52}	—	November 3, 1999	Socorro	LINEAR	·	24 km	MPC; JPL
24128 Hipsman	1999 VU_{53}	Hipsman	November 4, 1999	Socorro	LINEAR	NYS	3.8 km	MPC; JPL
24129 Oliviahu	1999 VJ_{62}	Oliviahu	November 4, 1999	Socorro	LINEAR	·	2.6 km	MPC; JPL
24130 Alexhuang	1999 VW_{63}	Alexhuang	November 4, 1999	Socorro	LINEAR	·	1.4 km	MPC; JPL
24131 Jonathuggins	1999 VG_{65}	Jonathuggins	November 4, 1999	Socorro	LINEAR	NYS	3.5 km	MPC; JPL
24132	1999 VS_{67}	—	November 4, 1999	Socorro	LINEAR	·	3.3 km	MPC; JPL
24133 Chunkaikao	1999 VW_{67}	Chunkaikao	November 4, 1999	Socorro	LINEAR	·	6.0 km	MPC; JPL
24134 Cliffordkim	1999 VD_{70}	Cliffordkim	November 4, 1999	Socorro	LINEAR	·	2.8 km	MPC; JPL
24135 Lisann	1999 VA_{71}	Lisann	November 4, 1999	Socorro	LINEAR	·	4.6 km	MPC; JPL
24136	1999 VL_{72}	—	November 14, 1999	Xinglong	SCAP	·	3.2 km	MPC; JPL
24137 Torre del Lago	1999 VP_{72}	Torre del Lago	November 9, 1999	Stroncone	A. Vagnozzi	·	5.1 km	MPC; JPL
24138 Benjaminlu	1999 VB_{81}	Benjaminlu	November 4, 1999	Socorro	LINEAR	V · fast	2.0 km	MPC; JPL
24139 Brianmcarthy	1999 VE_{89}	Brianmcarthy	November 4, 1999	Socorro	LINEAR	V	1.4 km	MPC; JPL
24140 Evanmirts	1999 VQ_{89}	Evanmirts	November 5, 1999	Socorro	LINEAR	·	1.9 km	MPC; JPL
24141	1999 VN_{113}	—	November 4, 1999	Catalina	CSS	NYS	2.6 km	MPC; JPL
24142	1999 VP_{114}	—	November 9, 1999	Catalina	CSS	·	3.4 km	MPC; JPL
24143	1999 VY_{124}	—	November 10, 1999	Socorro	LINEAR	·	2.2 km	MPC; JPL
24144 Philipmocz	1999 VU_{137}	Philipmocz	November 12, 1999	Socorro	LINEAR	KOR	3.5 km	MPC; JPL
24145	1999 VD_{154}	—	November 13, 1999	Catalina	CSS	·	9.3 km	MPC; JPL
24146 Benjamueller	1999 VY_{158}	Benjamueller	November 14, 1999	Socorro	LINEAR	·	3.2 km	MPC; JPL
24147 Stefanmuller	1999 VH_{162}	Stefanmuller	November 14, 1999	Socorro	LINEAR	·	3.2 km	MPC; JPL
24148 Mychajliw	1999 VM_{169}	Mychajliw	November 14, 1999	Socorro	LINEAR	·	3.2 km	MPC; JPL
24149 Raghavan	1999 VL_{173}	Raghavan	November 15, 1999	Socorro	LINEAR	·	3.4 km	MPC; JPL
24150	1999 VN_{174}	—	November 13, 1999	Catalina	CSS	·	2.9 km	MPC; JPL
24151	1999 VR_{184}	—	November 15, 1999	Socorro	LINEAR	·	3.4 km	MPC; JPL
24152 Ramasesh	1999 VR_{185}	Ramasesh	November 15, 1999	Socorro	LINEAR	·	5.0 km	MPC; JPL
24153 Davidalex	1999 VE_{188}	Davidalex	November 15, 1999	Socorro	LINEAR	·	2.6 km	MPC; JPL
24154 Ayonsen	1999 VP_{188}	Ayonsen	November 15, 1999	Socorro	LINEAR	·	2.6 km	MPC; JPL
24155 Serganov	1999 VX_{188}	Serganov	November 15, 1999	Socorro	LINEAR	·	2.7 km	MPC; JPL
24156 Hamsasridhar	1999 VZ_{188}	Hamsasridhar	November 15, 1999	Socorro	LINEAR	·	5.0 km	MPC; JPL
24157 Toshiyanagisawa	1999 VN_{192}	Toshiyanagisawa	November 1, 1999	Anderson Mesa	LONEOS	·	2.8 km	MPC; JPL
24158 Kokubo	1999 VV_{192}	Kokubo	November 1, 1999	Anderson Mesa	LONEOS	·	2.4 km	MPC; JPL
24159 Shigetakahashi	1999 VY_{192}	Shigetakahashi	November 1, 1999	Anderson Mesa	LONEOS	MRX	2.4 km	MPC; JPL
24160	1999 VS_{207}	—	November 9, 1999	Stroncone	Santa Lucia	·	4.8 km	MPC; JPL
24161	1999 VU_{219}	—	November 5, 1999	Socorro	LINEAR	·	3.7 km	MPC; JPL
24162 Askaci	1999 WD	Askaci	November 17, 1999	Olathe	Robinson, L.	AST	6.5 km	MPC; JPL
24163	1999 WT_{1}	—	November 25, 1999	Višnjan Observatory	K. Korlević	·	3.1 km	MPC; JPL
24164	1999 WM_{3}	—	November 28, 1999	Oizumi	T. Kobayashi	EOS	6.4 km	MPC; JPL
24165	1999 WQ_{3}	—	November 28, 1999	Oizumi	T. Kobayashi	·	2.6 km	MPC; JPL
24166	1999 WW_{3}	—	November 28, 1999	Oizumi	T. Kobayashi	·	4.5 km	MPC; JPL
24167	1999 WC_{4}	—	November 28, 1999	Oizumi	T. Kobayashi	·	8.4 km	MPC; JPL
24168 Hexlein	1999 WH_{9}	Hexlein	November 29, 1999	Starkenburg Observatory	Starkenburg	·	3.3 km	MPC; JPL
24169	1999 WQ_{11}	—	November 29, 1999	Oohira	T. Urata	·	4.4 km	MPC; JPL
24170	1999 WB_{13}	—	November 29, 1999	Bédoin	P. Antonini	V	2.1 km	MPC; JPL
24171	1999 XE_{1}	—	December 2, 1999	Oizumi	T. Kobayashi	·	4.6 km	MPC; JPL
24172	1999 XG_{1}	—	December 2, 1999	Oizumi	T. Kobayashi	V	3.0 km	MPC; JPL
24173 SLAS	1999 XS_{1}	SLAS	December 3, 1999	Oaxaca	Roe, J. M.	GEF	4.0 km	MPC; JPL
24174	1999 XZ_{4}	—	December 4, 1999	Catalina	CSS	·	5.0 km	MPC; JPL
24175	1999 XD_{5}	—	December 4, 1999	Catalina	CSS	·	4.6 km	MPC; JPL
24176	1999 XP_{6}	—	December 4, 1999	Catalina	CSS	·	4.0 km	MPC; JPL
24177	1999 XJ_{7}	—	December 4, 1999	Fountain Hills	C. W. Juels	V	3.5 km	MPC; JPL
24178	1999 XL_{7}	—	December 4, 1999	Fountain Hills	C. W. Juels	URS	16 km	MPC; JPL
24179	1999 XS_{7}	—	December 4, 1999	Fountain Hills	C. W. Juels	EUN	6.3 km	MPC; JPL
24180	1999 XH_{8}	—	December 3, 1999	Oizumi	T. Kobayashi	·	6.3 km	MPC; JPL
24181	1999 XN_{8}	—	December 2, 1999	Kvistaberg	Uppsala-DLR Asteroid Survey	EUN	6.0 km	MPC; JPL
24182	1999 XP_{11}	—	December 5, 1999	Catalina	CSS	PAD	7.3 km	MPC; JPL
24183	1999 XV_{11}	—	December 6, 1999	Catalina	CSS	·	2.9 km	MPC; JPL
24184	1999 XS_{13}	—	December 5, 1999	Socorro	LINEAR	·	5.9 km	MPC; JPL
24185	1999 XM_{14}	—	December 3, 1999	Nachi-Katsuura	Y. Shimizu, T. Urata	PAD	8.5 km	MPC; JPL
24186 Shivanisud	1999 XL_{18}	Shivanisud	December 3, 1999	Socorro	LINEAR	·	3.8 km	MPC; JPL
24187	1999 XO_{18}	—	December 3, 1999	Socorro	LINEAR	NYS	2.7 km	MPC; JPL
24188 Matthewage	1999 XS_{24}	Matthewage	December 6, 1999	Socorro	LINEAR	·	3.8 km	MPC; JPL
24189 Lewasserman	1999 XR_{25}	Lewasserman	December 6, 1999	Socorro	LINEAR	·	2.9 km	MPC; JPL
24190 Xiaoyunyin	1999 XT_{28}	Xiaoyunyin	December 6, 1999	Socorro	LINEAR	·	3.4 km	MPC; JPL
24191 Qiaochuyuan	1999 XK_{30}	Qiaochuyuan	December 6, 1999	Socorro	LINEAR	PAD	6.1 km	MPC; JPL
24192	1999 XM_{30}	—	December 6, 1999	Socorro	LINEAR	DOR	12 km	MPC; JPL
24193	1999 XF_{32}	—	December 6, 1999	Socorro	LINEAR	·	9.7 km	MPC; JPL
24194 Paľuš	1999 XU_{35}	Paľuš	December 8, 1999	Modra	A. Galád, D. Kalmančok	HYG	9.1 km	MPC; JPL
24195	1999 XD_{36}	—	December 6, 1999	Gekko	T. Kagawa	EUN	5.7 km	MPC; JPL
24196	1999 XG_{37}	—	December 7, 1999	Fountain Hills	C. W. Juels	EUN	3.3 km	MPC; JPL
24197	1999 XP_{37}	—	December 7, 1999	Črni Vrh	Mikuž, H.	GEF	4.0 km	MPC; JPL
24198 Xiaomengzeng	1999 XB_{39}	Xiaomengzeng	December 6, 1999	Socorro	LINEAR	·	6.7 km	MPC; JPL
24199 Tsarevsky	1999 XD_{39}	Tsarevsky	December 6, 1999	Socorro	LINEAR	HYG	7.8 km	MPC; JPL
24200 Peterbrooks	1999 XB_{40}	Peterbrooks	December 6, 1999	Socorro	LINEAR	V	3.1 km	MPC; JPL

== 24201–24300 ==
back to top

Designation			Discovery			Properties		Ref
Permanent	Provisional	Named after	Date	Site	Discoverer(s)	Category	Diam.	Ref
24201 Davidkeith	1999 XL_{40}	Davidkeith	December 7, 1999	Socorro	LINEAR	·	3.5 km	MPC; JPL
24202	1999 XR_{42}	—	December 7, 1999	Socorro	LINEAR	·	3.2 km	MPC; JPL
24203	1999 XA_{46}	—	December 7, 1999	Socorro	LINEAR	·	3.3 km	MPC; JPL
24204 Trinkle	1999 XZ_{46}	Trinkle	December 7, 1999	Socorro	LINEAR	KOR	4.0 km	MPC; JPL
24205	1999 XC_{48}	—	December 7, 1999	Socorro	LINEAR	·	2.2 km	MPC; JPL
24206 Mariealoia	1999 XH_{48}	Mariealoia	December 7, 1999	Socorro	LINEAR	NYS	3.5 km	MPC; JPL
24207	1999 XJ_{49}	—	December 7, 1999	Socorro	LINEAR	·	5.3 km	MPC; JPL
24208 Stelguerrero	1999 XC_{51}	Stelguerrero	December 7, 1999	Socorro	LINEAR	·	4.0 km	MPC; JPL
24209	1999 XM_{51}	—	December 7, 1999	Socorro	LINEAR	·	2.0 km	MPC; JPL
24210 Handsberry	1999 XM_{52}	Handsberry	December 7, 1999	Socorro	LINEAR	·	9.0 km	MPC; JPL
24211 Barbarawood	1999 XD_{53}	Barbarawood	December 7, 1999	Socorro	LINEAR	·	2.3 km	MPC; JPL
24212	1999 XW_{59}	—	December 7, 1999	Socorro	LINEAR	L4	20 km	MPC; JPL
24213	1999 XA_{61}	—	December 7, 1999	Socorro	LINEAR	·	4.8 km	MPC; JPL
24214 Jonchristo	1999 XC_{67}	Jonchristo	December 7, 1999	Socorro	LINEAR	·	5.3 km	MPC; JPL
24215 Jongastel	1999 XN_{68}	Jongastel	December 7, 1999	Socorro	LINEAR	·	2.9 km	MPC; JPL
24216	1999 XR_{68}	—	December 7, 1999	Socorro	LINEAR	PAD	7.0 km	MPC; JPL
24217 Paulroeder	1999 XO_{70}	Paulroeder	December 7, 1999	Socorro	LINEAR	·	4.0 km	MPC; JPL
24218 Linfrederick	1999 XV_{70}	Linfrederick	December 7, 1999	Socorro	LINEAR	·	3.0 km	MPC; JPL
24219 Chrisodom	1999 XW_{71}	Chrisodom	December 7, 1999	Socorro	LINEAR	·	3.2 km	MPC; JPL
24220	1999 XJ_{72}	—	December 7, 1999	Socorro	LINEAR	MAS	2.5 km	MPC; JPL
24221	1999 XT_{73}	—	December 7, 1999	Socorro	LINEAR	THM	6.8 km	MPC; JPL
24222	1999 XW_{74}	—	December 7, 1999	Socorro	LINEAR	·	4.4 km	MPC; JPL
24223	1999 XR_{76}	—	December 7, 1999	Socorro	LINEAR	·	3.5 km	MPC; JPL
24224 Matthewdavis	1999 XU_{76}	Matthewdavis	December 7, 1999	Socorro	LINEAR	EOS	6.6 km	MPC; JPL
24225	1999 XV_{80}	—	December 7, 1999	Socorro	LINEAR	L4	15 km	MPC; JPL
24226 Sekhsaria	1999 XM_{81}	Sekhsaria	December 7, 1999	Socorro	LINEAR	·	5.5 km	MPC; JPL
24227	1999 XU_{86}	—	December 7, 1999	Socorro	LINEAR	·	6.0 km	MPC; JPL
24228	1999 XC_{87}	—	December 7, 1999	Socorro	LINEAR	·	7.8 km	MPC; JPL
24229	1999 XC_{90}	—	December 7, 1999	Socorro	LINEAR	·	13 km	MPC; JPL
24230	1999 XE_{90}	—	December 7, 1999	Socorro	LINEAR	·	8.9 km	MPC; JPL
24231	1999 XN_{91}	—	December 7, 1999	Socorro	LINEAR	·	7.0 km	MPC; JPL
24232 Lanthrum	1999 XA_{92}	Lanthrum	December 7, 1999	Socorro	LINEAR	·	7.0 km	MPC; JPL
24233	1999 XD_{94}	—	December 7, 1999	Socorro	LINEAR	L4	23 km	MPC; JPL
24234	1999 XA_{95}	—	December 8, 1999	Socorro	LINEAR	·	4.0 km	MPC; JPL
24235	1999 XK_{95}	—	December 7, 1999	Oizumi	T. Kobayashi	V	3.5 km	MPC; JPL
24236 Danielberger	1999 XS_{96}	Danielberger	December 7, 1999	Socorro	LINEAR	PAD	8.9 km	MPC; JPL
24237	1999 XL_{97}	—	December 7, 1999	Socorro	LINEAR	·	10 km	MPC; JPL
24238 Adkerson	1999 XQ_{97}	Adkerson	December 7, 1999	Socorro	LINEAR	V	2.9 km	MPC; JPL
24239 Paulinehiga	1999 XX_{97}	Paulinehiga	December 7, 1999	Socorro	LINEAR	·	2.4 km	MPC; JPL
24240 Tinagal	1999 XV_{99}	Tinagal	December 7, 1999	Socorro	LINEAR	·	2.8 km	MPC; JPL
24241	1999 XK_{100}	—	December 7, 1999	Socorro	LINEAR	·	6.4 km	MPC; JPL
24242	1999 XY_{100}	—	December 7, 1999	Socorro	LINEAR	·	2.9 km	MPC; JPL
24243	1999 XL_{101}	—	December 7, 1999	Socorro	LINEAR	EOS	7.7 km	MPC; JPL
24244	1999 XY_{101}	—	December 7, 1999	Socorro	LINEAR	L4	35 km	MPC; JPL
24245 Ezratty	1999 XB_{102}	Ezratty	December 7, 1999	Socorro	LINEAR	(2076)	4.1 km	MPC; JPL
24246	1999 XC_{102}	—	December 7, 1999	Socorro	LINEAR	EOS	4.8 km	MPC; JPL
24247	1999 XD_{105}	—	December 9, 1999	Fountain Hills	C. W. Juels	EOS ·	5.2 km	MPC; JPL
24248	1999 XU_{105}	—	December 11, 1999	Oizumi	T. Kobayashi	DOR	9.0 km	MPC; JPL
24249 Bobbiolson	1999 XC_{107}	Bobbiolson	December 4, 1999	Catalina	CSS	NYS	3.2 km	MPC; JPL
24250 Luteolson	1999 XS_{109}	Luteolson	December 4, 1999	Catalina	CSS	·	3.9 km	MPC; JPL
24251	1999 XL_{117}	—	December 5, 1999	Catalina	CSS	·	4.0 km	MPC; JPL
24252	1999 XW_{117}	—	December 5, 1999	Catalina	CSS	·	3.8 km	MPC; JPL
24253	1999 XX_{120}	—	December 5, 1999	Catalina	CSS	·	4.1 km	MPC; JPL
24254	1999 XB_{122}	—	December 7, 1999	Catalina	CSS	MAR	6.4 km	MPC; JPL
24255	1999 XR_{124}	—	December 7, 1999	Catalina	CSS	·	4.2 km	MPC; JPL
24256	1999 XZ_{125}	—	December 7, 1999	Catalina	CSS	·	5.8 km	MPC; JPL
24257	1999 XQ_{126}	—	December 7, 1999	Catalina	CSS	·	4.3 km	MPC; JPL
24258	1999 XH_{127}	—	December 9, 1999	Fountain Hills	C. W. Juels	·	3.4 km	MPC; JPL
24259 Chriswalker	1999 XR_{127}	Chriswalker	December 12, 1999	Goodricke-Pigott	R. A. Tucker	PHO	3.3 km	MPC; JPL
24260 Kriváň	1999 XW_{127}	Kriváň	December 13, 1999	Ondřejov	P. Kušnirák	EUN	8.3 km	MPC; JPL
24261 Judilegault	1999 XA_{130}	Judilegault	December 12, 1999	Socorro	LINEAR	V	2.9 km	MPC; JPL
24262	1999 XG_{133}	—	December 12, 1999	Socorro	LINEAR	·	6.1 km	MPC; JPL
24263	1999 XL_{133}	—	December 12, 1999	Socorro	LINEAR	EOS	8.3 km	MPC; JPL
24264	1999 XL_{143}	—	December 15, 1999	Fountain Hills	C. W. Juels	GEF	3.8 km	MPC; JPL
24265 Banthonytwarog	1999 XU_{143}	Banthonytwarog	December 13, 1999	Farpoint	G. Hug, G. Bell	·	3.2 km	MPC; JPL
24266	1999 XE_{144}	—	December 13, 1999	Višnjan Observatory	K. Korlević	·	3.5 km	MPC; JPL
24267	1999 XU_{144}	—	December 6, 1999	Kitt Peak	Spacewatch	·	2.2 km	MPC; JPL
24268 Charconley	1999 XN_{156}	Charconley	December 8, 1999	Socorro	LINEAR	HOF	7.8 km	MPC; JPL
24269 Kittappa	1999 XL_{157}	Kittappa	December 8, 1999	Socorro	LINEAR	·	4.7 km	MPC; JPL
24270 Dougskinner	1999 XD_{158}	Dougskinner	December 8, 1999	Socorro	LINEAR	·	6.0 km	MPC; JPL
24271	1999 XR_{159}	—	December 8, 1999	Socorro	LINEAR	NEM	7.8 km	MPC; JPL
24272	1999 XE_{165}	—	December 8, 1999	Socorro	LINEAR	·	7.8 km	MPC; JPL
24273	1999 XO_{166}	—	December 10, 1999	Socorro	LINEAR	·	2.6 km	MPC; JPL
24274 Alliswheeler	1999 XN_{167}	Alliswheeler	December 10, 1999	Socorro	LINEAR	(5)	3.1 km	MPC; JPL
24275	1999 XW_{167}	—	December 10, 1999	Socorro	LINEAR	L4	28 km	MPC; JPL
24276	1999 XO_{169}	—	December 10, 1999	Socorro	LINEAR	·	11 km	MPC; JPL
24277 Schoch	1999 XQ_{169}	Schoch	December 10, 1999	Socorro	LINEAR	·	3.7 km	MPC; JPL
24278 Davidgreen	1999 XZ_{170}	Davidgreen	December 10, 1999	Socorro	LINEAR	·	4.2 km	MPC; JPL
24279	1999 XR_{171}	—	December 10, 1999	Socorro	LINEAR	L4	20 km	MPC; JPL
24280 Rohenderson	1999 XE_{172}	Rohenderson	December 10, 1999	Socorro	LINEAR	·	5.9 km	MPC; JPL
24281	1999 XT_{174}	—	December 10, 1999	Socorro	LINEAR	EOS	7.0 km	MPC; JPL
24282	1999 XB_{179}	—	December 10, 1999	Socorro	LINEAR	(1118)	19 km	MPC; JPL
24283	1999 XE_{179}	—	December 10, 1999	Socorro	LINEAR	EOS	6.6 km	MPC; JPL
24284	1999 XJ_{183}	—	December 12, 1999	Socorro	LINEAR	·	8.1 km	MPC; JPL
24285	1999 XC_{188}	—	December 12, 1999	Socorro	LINEAR	·	4.3 km	MPC; JPL
24286	1999 XU_{188}	—	December 12, 1999	Socorro	LINEAR	·	2.8 km	MPC; JPL
24287	1999 XC_{189}	—	December 12, 1999	Socorro	LINEAR	EOS	5.1 km	MPC; JPL
24288	1999 XR_{189}	—	December 12, 1999	Socorro	LINEAR	·	2.9 km	MPC; JPL
24289 Anthonypalma	1999 XO_{190}	Anthonypalma	December 12, 1999	Socorro	LINEAR	·	3.4 km	MPC; JPL
24290	1999 XS_{190}	—	December 12, 1999	Socorro	LINEAR	·	8.5 km	MPC; JPL
24291	1999 XJ_{191}	—	December 12, 1999	Socorro	LINEAR	·	13 km	MPC; JPL
24292 Susanragan	1999 XV_{191}	Susanragan	December 12, 1999	Socorro	LINEAR	·	6.4 km	MPC; JPL
24293	1999 XW_{191}	—	December 12, 1999	Socorro	LINEAR	·	2.3 km	MPC; JPL
24294	1999 XE_{193}	—	December 12, 1999	Socorro	LINEAR	·	3.4 km	MPC; JPL
24295	1999 XX_{200}	—	December 12, 1999	Socorro	LINEAR	GEF	4.9 km	MPC; JPL
24296 Marychristie	1999 XW_{212}	Marychristie	December 14, 1999	Socorro	LINEAR	·	3.1 km	MPC; JPL
24297 Jonbach	1999 XZ_{213}	Jonbach	December 14, 1999	Socorro	LINEAR	·	3.3 km	MPC; JPL
24298	1999 XC_{221}	—	December 14, 1999	Socorro	LINEAR	EUN	7.8 km	MPC; JPL
24299	1999 XE_{221}	—	December 14, 1999	Socorro	LINEAR	EOS	9.3 km	MPC; JPL
24300	1999 XX_{223}	—	December 13, 1999	Kitt Peak	Spacewatch	NYS	2.3 km	MPC; JPL

== 24301–24400 ==
back to top

Designation			Discovery			Properties		Ref
Permanent	Provisional	Named after	Date	Site	Discoverer(s)	Category	Diam.	Ref
24301 Gural	1999 XZ_{233}	Gural	December 4, 1999	Anderson Mesa	LONEOS	·	4.3 km	MPC; JPL
24302	1999 XP_{242}	—	December 13, 1999	Socorro	LINEAR	·	5.3 km	MPC; JPL
24303 Michaelrice	1999 YY	Michaelrice	December 16, 1999	Fountain Hills	C. W. Juels	·	3.6 km	MPC; JPL
24304 Lynnrice	1999 YZ	Lynnrice	December 16, 1999	Fountain Hills	C. W. Juels	V	2.2 km	MPC; JPL
24305 Darrellparnell	1999 YG_{4}	Darrellparnell	December 26, 1999	Farpoint	G. Hug, G. Bell	·	4.4 km	MPC; JPL
24306	1999 YE_{5}	—	December 27, 1999	Moriyama	Ikari, Y.	·	6.8 km	MPC; JPL
24307	1999 YB_{7}	—	December 30, 1999	Socorro	LINEAR	URS	10 km	MPC; JPL
24308 Cowenco	1999 YC_{9}	Cowenco	December 29, 1999	Farpoint	G. Hug, G. Bell	KOR	4.5 km	MPC; JPL
24309	1999 YF_{9}	—	December 31, 1999	Višnjan Observatory	K. Korlević	·	4.6 km	MPC; JPL
24310	1999 YT_{9}	—	December 31, 1999	Oizumi	T. Kobayashi	·	5.1 km	MPC; JPL
24311	1999 YS_{15}	—	December 31, 1999	Kitt Peak	Spacewatch	·	6.6 km	MPC; JPL
24312	1999 YO_{22}	—	December 31, 1999	Anderson Mesa	LONEOS	L4	26 km	MPC; JPL
24313	1999 YR_{27}	—	December 30, 1999	Socorro	LINEAR	L4	35 km	MPC; JPL
24314	2000 AQ_{2}	—	January 3, 2000	Oizumi	T. Kobayashi	·	10 km	MPC; JPL
24315	2000 AV_{4}	—	January 4, 2000	Oaxaca	Roe, J. M.	·	9.6 km	MPC; JPL
24316 Anncooper	2000 AQ_{11}	Anncooper	January 3, 2000	Socorro	LINEAR	·	3.2 km	MPC; JPL
24317 Pukarhamal	2000 AL_{12}	Pukarhamal	January 3, 2000	Socorro	LINEAR	·	3.6 km	MPC; JPL
24318 Vivianlee	2000 AE_{14}	Vivianlee	January 3, 2000	Socorro	LINEAR	NYS	5.2 km	MPC; JPL
24319	2000 AY_{15}	—	January 3, 2000	Socorro	LINEAR	·	3.5 km	MPC; JPL
24320	2000 AS_{17}	—	January 3, 2000	Socorro	LINEAR	EOS	5.5 km	MPC; JPL
24321	2000 AO_{23}	—	January 3, 2000	Socorro	LINEAR	·	9.9 km	MPC; JPL
24322	2000 AM_{43}	—	January 4, 2000	Črni Vrh	Mikuž, H.	·	6.7 km	MPC; JPL
24323	2000 AW_{49}	—	January 5, 2000	Ondřejov	P. Pravec, P. Kušnirák	·	4.1 km	MPC; JPL
24324	2000 AT_{51}	—	January 4, 2000	Socorro	LINEAR	·	10 km	MPC; JPL
24325 Kaleighanne	2000 AB_{52}	Kaleighanne	January 4, 2000	Socorro	LINEAR	V	2.5 km	MPC; JPL
24326	2000 AS_{53}	—	January 4, 2000	Socorro	LINEAR	·	9.1 km	MPC; JPL
24327	2000 AB_{54}	—	January 4, 2000	Socorro	LINEAR	EOS	8.9 km	MPC; JPL
24328 Thomasburr	2000 AF_{54}	Thomasburr	January 4, 2000	Socorro	LINEAR	·	3.4 km	MPC; JPL
24329	2000 AR_{56}	—	January 4, 2000	Socorro	LINEAR	·	6.0 km	MPC; JPL
24330	2000 AC_{66}	—	January 4, 2000	Socorro	LINEAR	·	5.8 km	MPC; JPL
24331 Alyshaowen	2000 AL_{68}	Alyshaowen	January 5, 2000	Socorro	LINEAR	V	3.2 km	MPC; JPL
24332 Shaunalinn	2000 AK_{69}	Shaunalinn	January 5, 2000	Socorro	LINEAR	NYS	3.7 km	MPC; JPL
24333 Petermassey	2000 AA_{70}	Petermassey	January 5, 2000	Socorro	LINEAR	·	3.3 km	MPC; JPL
24334 Conard	2000 AL_{71}	Conard	January 5, 2000	Socorro	LINEAR	·	5.3 km	MPC; JPL
24335	2000 AG_{76}	—	January 5, 2000	Socorro	LINEAR	·	4.6 km	MPC; JPL
24336	2000 AD_{77}	—	January 5, 2000	Socorro	LINEAR	PHO	5.8 km	MPC; JPL
24337 Johannessen	2000 AF_{77}	Johannessen	January 5, 2000	Socorro	LINEAR	V	2.5 km	MPC; JPL
24338	2000 AE_{80}	—	January 5, 2000	Socorro	LINEAR	HYG	7.1 km	MPC; JPL
24339	2000 AK_{84}	—	January 5, 2000	Socorro	LINEAR	·	5.3 km	MPC; JPL
24340	2000 AP_{84}	—	January 5, 2000	Socorro	LINEAR	L4	19 km	MPC; JPL
24341	2000 AJ_{87}	—	January 5, 2000	Socorro	LINEAR	L4	16 km	MPC; JPL
24342	2000 AV_{87}	—	January 5, 2000	Socorro	LINEAR	EOS · fast	7.2 km	MPC; JPL
24343	2000 AS_{88}	—	January 5, 2000	Socorro	LINEAR	EOS	6.7 km	MPC; JPL
24344 Brianbarnett	2000 AB_{99}	Brianbarnett	January 5, 2000	Socorro	LINEAR	·	2.2 km	MPC; JPL
24345 Llaverias	2000 AU_{99}	Llaverias	January 5, 2000	Socorro	LINEAR	·	4.0 km	MPC; JPL
24346 Lehienphan	2000 AK_{100}	Lehienphan	January 5, 2000	Socorro	LINEAR	·	6.6 km	MPC; JPL
24347 Arthurkuan	2000 AF_{102}	Arthurkuan	January 5, 2000	Socorro	LINEAR	·	2.8 km	MPC; JPL
24348	2000 AO_{102}	—	January 5, 2000	Socorro	LINEAR	·	2.6 km	MPC; JPL
24349	2000 AA_{103}	—	January 5, 2000	Socorro	LINEAR	·	1.7 km	MPC; JPL
24350	2000 AJ_{103}	—	January 5, 2000	Socorro	LINEAR	EOS	7.9 km	MPC; JPL
24351 Fionawood	2000 AD_{104}	Fionawood	January 5, 2000	Socorro	LINEAR	·	3.1 km	MPC; JPL
24352 Kapilrama	2000 AE_{104}	Kapilrama	January 5, 2000	Socorro	LINEAR	V	2.3 km	MPC; JPL
24353 Patrickhsu	2000 AG_{104}	Patrickhsu	January 5, 2000	Socorro	LINEAR	EOS	4.9 km	MPC; JPL
24354 Caz	2000 AA_{105}	Caz	January 5, 2000	Socorro	LINEAR	·	3.9 km	MPC; JPL
24355	2000 AJ_{111}	—	January 5, 2000	Socorro	LINEAR	·	12 km	MPC; JPL
24356	2000 AO_{114}	—	January 5, 2000	Socorro	LINEAR	·	5.0 km	MPC; JPL
24357	2000 AC_{115}	—	January 5, 2000	Socorro	LINEAR	L4 · slow	22 km	MPC; JPL
24358	2000 AV_{117}	—	January 5, 2000	Socorro	LINEAR	HYG	10 km	MPC; JPL
24359	2000 AS_{118}	—	January 5, 2000	Socorro	LINEAR	MAR	5.4 km	MPC; JPL
24360	2000 AG_{120}	—	January 5, 2000	Socorro	LINEAR	·	9.9 km	MPC; JPL
24361	2000 AK_{120}	—	January 5, 2000	Socorro	LINEAR	CYB	12 km	MPC; JPL
24362	2000 AR_{120}	—	January 5, 2000	Socorro	LINEAR	·	17 km	MPC; JPL
24363	2000 AH_{121}	—	January 5, 2000	Socorro	LINEAR	·	9.8 km	MPC; JPL
24364	2000 AK_{121}	—	January 5, 2000	Socorro	LINEAR	·	4.3 km	MPC; JPL
24365	2000 AE_{124}	—	January 5, 2000	Socorro	LINEAR	·	4.9 km	MPC; JPL
24366	2000 AY_{124}	—	January 5, 2000	Socorro	LINEAR	EOS	7.3 km	MPC; JPL
24367	2000 AC_{126}	—	January 5, 2000	Socorro	LINEAR	·	8.9 km	MPC; JPL
24368	2000 AQ_{127}	—	January 5, 2000	Socorro	LINEAR	·	5.5 km	MPC; JPL
24369 Evanichols	2000 AE_{132}	Evanichols	January 3, 2000	Socorro	LINEAR	·	7.2 km	MPC; JPL
24370 Marywang	2000 AX_{139}	Marywang	January 5, 2000	Socorro	LINEAR	V	2.1 km	MPC; JPL
24371	2000 AC_{140}	—	January 5, 2000	Socorro	LINEAR	·	3.3 km	MPC; JPL
24372 Timobauman	2000 AG_{140}	Timobauman	January 5, 2000	Socorro	LINEAR	V	1.7 km	MPC; JPL
24373	2000 AN_{143}	—	January 5, 2000	Socorro	LINEAR	·	4.6 km	MPC; JPL
24374	2000 AV_{143}	—	January 5, 2000	Socorro	LINEAR	EOS	8.2 km	MPC; JPL
24375	2000 AU_{144}	—	January 5, 2000	Socorro	LINEAR	·	5.8 km	MPC; JPL
24376 Ramesh	2000 AB_{152}	Ramesh	January 8, 2000	Socorro	LINEAR	·	3.1 km	MPC; JPL
24377	2000 AO_{154}	—	January 2, 2000	Socorro	LINEAR	·	4.9 km	MPC; JPL
24378 Katelyngibbs	2000 AZ_{154}	Katelyngibbs	January 3, 2000	Socorro	LINEAR	KOR	4.0 km	MPC; JPL
24379	2000 AW_{158}	—	January 3, 2000	Socorro	LINEAR	EOS	6.0 km	MPC; JPL
24380 Dorippe	2000 AA_{160}	Dorippe	January 3, 2000	Socorro	LINEAR	L4 · ERY	32 km	MPC; JPL
24381	2000 AA_{166}	—	January 8, 2000	Socorro	LINEAR	·	14 km	MPC; JPL
24382	2000 AG_{169}	—	January 7, 2000	Socorro	LINEAR	·	4.5 km	MPC; JPL
24383	2000 AC_{170}	—	January 7, 2000	Socorro	LINEAR	·	3.7 km	MPC; JPL
24384	2000 AR_{171}	—	January 7, 2000	Socorro	LINEAR	DOR	13 km	MPC; JPL
24385 Katcagen	2000 AM_{172}	Katcagen	January 7, 2000	Socorro	LINEAR	·	8.0 km	MPC; JPL
24386 McLindon	2000 AV_{172}	McLindon	January 7, 2000	Socorro	LINEAR	·	5.4 km	MPC; JPL
24387 Trettel	2000 AB_{174}	Trettel	January 7, 2000	Socorro	LINEAR	·	5.9 km	MPC; JPL
24388	2000 AB_{175}	—	January 7, 2000	Socorro	LINEAR	AEG	20 km	MPC; JPL
24389	2000 AA_{177}	—	January 7, 2000	Socorro	LINEAR	·	5.2 km	MPC; JPL
24390	2000 AD_{177}	—	January 7, 2000	Socorro	LINEAR	L4	25 km	MPC; JPL
24391	2000 AU_{178}	—	January 7, 2000	Socorro	LINEAR	·	8.9 km	MPC; JPL
24392	2000 AD_{179}	—	January 7, 2000	Socorro	LINEAR	·	12 km	MPC; JPL
24393	2000 AG_{183}	—	January 7, 2000	Socorro	LINEAR	EOS	5.1 km	MPC; JPL
24394	2000 AD_{186}	—	January 8, 2000	Socorro	LINEAR	·	3.2 km	MPC; JPL
24395	2000 AR_{186}	—	January 8, 2000	Socorro	LINEAR	·	3.0 km	MPC; JPL
24396	2000 AS_{186}	—	January 8, 2000	Socorro	LINEAR	EOS	4.9 km	MPC; JPL
24397 Parkerowan	2000 AT_{186}	Parkerowan	January 8, 2000	Socorro	LINEAR	·	3.3 km	MPC; JPL
24398	2000 AZ_{187}	—	January 8, 2000	Socorro	LINEAR	·	4.0 km	MPC; JPL
24399	2000 AB_{188}	—	January 8, 2000	Socorro	LINEAR	EUN	3.0 km	MPC; JPL
24400	2000 AF_{192}	—	January 8, 2000	Socorro	LINEAR	·	10 km	MPC; JPL

== 24401–24500 ==
back to top

Designation			Discovery			Properties		Ref
Permanent	Provisional	Named after	Date	Site	Discoverer(s)	Category	Diam.	Ref
24401	2000 AS_{192}	—	January 8, 2000	Socorro	LINEAR	·	4.9 km	MPC; JPL
24402	2000 AT_{192}	—	January 8, 2000	Socorro	LINEAR	·	8.9 km	MPC; JPL
24403	2000 AX_{193}	—	January 8, 2000	Socorro	LINEAR	L4	29 km	MPC; JPL
24404	2000 AB_{194}	—	January 8, 2000	Socorro	LINEAR	EOS	9.8 km	MPC; JPL
24405	2000 AT_{197}	—	January 8, 2000	Socorro	LINEAR	EOS	5.6 km	MPC; JPL
24406	2000 AR_{199}	—	January 9, 2000	Socorro	LINEAR	·	6.1 km	MPC; JPL
24407	2000 AJ_{200}	—	January 9, 2000	Socorro	LINEAR	·	7.3 km	MPC; JPL
24408	2000 AH_{214}	—	January 6, 2000	Kitt Peak	Spacewatch	·	10 km	MPC; JPL
24409 Caninquinn	2000 AH_{235}	Caninquinn	January 5, 2000	Socorro	LINEAR	·	7.2 km	MPC; JPL
24410 Juliewalker	2000 AZ_{236}	Juliewalker	January 5, 2000	Socorro	LINEAR	·	3.5 km	MPC; JPL
24411 Janches	2000 AU_{240}	Janches	January 7, 2000	Anderson Mesa	LONEOS	·	7.0 km	MPC; JPL
24412 Ericpalmer	2000 AM_{243}	Ericpalmer	January 7, 2000	Anderson Mesa	LONEOS	slow	19 km	MPC; JPL
24413 Britneyschmidt	2000 AN_{243}	Britneyschmidt	January 7, 2000	Anderson Mesa	LONEOS	·	12 km	MPC; JPL
24414 Anzhenhosp	2000 AJ_{246}	Anzhenhosp	January 13, 2000	Xinglong	SCAP	·	10 km	MPC; JPL
24415	2000 AA_{251}	—	January 3, 2000	Socorro	LINEAR	THM	8.3 km	MPC; JPL
24416	2000 BF_{2}	—	January 25, 2000	Višnjan Observatory	K. Korlević	THM	9.2 km	MPC; JPL
24417	2000 BK_{5}	—	January 27, 2000	Socorro	LINEAR	·	8.7 km	MPC; JPL
24418	2000 BA_{7}	—	January 27, 2000	Socorro	LINEAR	·	9.3 km	MPC; JPL
24419	2000 BE_{16}	—	January 29, 2000	Socorro	LINEAR	·	5.2 km	MPC; JPL
24420 Thasos	2000 BU_{22}	Thasos	January 29, 2000	Kitt Peak	Spacewatch	L4 · ERY	22 km	MPC; JPL
24421 Djorgovski	2000 BQ_{33}	Djorgovski	January 30, 2000	Catalina	CSS	AGN ·	8.8 km	MPC; JPL
24422 Helentressa	2000 CF_{3}	Helentressa	February 2, 2000	Socorro	LINEAR	V	2.3 km	MPC; JPL
24423	2000 CR_{3}	—	February 2, 2000	Socorro	LINEAR	EOS	8.3 km	MPC; JPL
24424	2000 CS_{5}	—	February 2, 2000	Socorro	LINEAR	EOS	5.9 km	MPC; JPL
24425	2000 CW_{6}	—	February 2, 2000	Socorro	LINEAR	·	6.8 km	MPC; JPL
24426 Belova	2000 CR_{12}	Belova	February 2, 2000	Socorro	LINEAR	L4 · ERY	14 km	MPC; JPL
24427	2000 CN_{21}	—	February 2, 2000	Socorro	LINEAR	·	9.3 km	MPC; JPL
24428	2000 CZ_{26}	—	February 2, 2000	Socorro	LINEAR	·	6.0 km	MPC; JPL
24429	2000 CV_{27}	—	February 2, 2000	Socorro	LINEAR	THM	11 km	MPC; JPL
24430	2000 CN_{35}	—	February 2, 2000	Socorro	LINEAR	·	4.7 km	MPC; JPL
24431	2000 CR_{45}	—	February 2, 2000	Socorro	LINEAR	VER	14 km	MPC; JPL
24432 Elizamcnitt	2000 CT_{48}	Elizamcnitt	February 2, 2000	Socorro	LINEAR	·	3.6 km	MPC; JPL
24433	2000 CF_{83}	—	February 4, 2000	Socorro	LINEAR	GEF	6.7 km	MPC; JPL
24434 Josephhoscheidt	2000 CY_{112}	Josephhoscheidt	February 7, 2000	Catalina	CSS	·	8.6 km	MPC; JPL
24435	2000 DN	—	February 23, 2000	Višnjan Observatory	K. Korlević	·	8.1 km	MPC; JPL
24436	2000 ES_{56}	—	March 8, 2000	Socorro	LINEAR	·	5.8 km	MPC; JPL
24437	2000 EW_{93}	—	March 9, 2000	Socorro	LINEAR	EOS	8.2 km	MPC; JPL
24438 Michaeloy	2000 EV_{94}	Michaeloy	March 9, 2000	Socorro	LINEAR	V	2.2 km	MPC; JPL
24439 Yanney	2000 EM_{144}	Yanney	March 3, 2000	Catalina	CSS	·	16 km	MPC; JPL
24440	2000 FB_{1}	—	March 26, 2000	Socorro	LINEAR	·	25 km	MPC; JPL
24441 Jopek	2000 FM_{29}	Jopek	March 27, 2000	Anderson Mesa	LONEOS	·	2.7 km	MPC; JPL
24442	2000 GM_{122}	—	April 10, 2000	Haleakala	NEAT	·	5.0 km	MPC; JPL
24443	2000 OG	—	July 21, 2000	Socorro	LINEAR	T_{j} (2.94) · APO +1km	1.8 km	MPC; JPL
24444	2000 OP_{32}	—	July 30, 2000	Socorro	LINEAR	L5	24 km	MPC; JPL
24445	2000 PM_{8}	—	August 2, 2000	Mauna Kea	Veillet, C.	AMO · APO +1km	4.1 km	MPC; JPL
24446	2000 PR_{25}	—	August 4, 2000	Socorro	LINEAR	L5	31 km	MPC; JPL
24447	2000 QY_{1}	—	August 24, 2000	Socorro	LINEAR	·	890 m	MPC; JPL
24448	2000 QE_{42}	—	August 24, 2000	Socorro	LINEAR	L5	26 km	MPC; JPL
24449	2000 QL_{63}	—	August 28, 2000	Socorro	LINEAR	L5	23 km	MPC; JPL
24450 Victorchang	2000 QC_{69}	Victorchang	August 29, 2000	Reedy Creek	J. Broughton	·	4.5 km	MPC; JPL
24451 Molion	2000 QS_{104}	Molion	August 28, 2000	Socorro	LINEAR	L5	41 km	MPC; JPL
24452	2000 QU_{167}	—	August 31, 2000	Socorro	LINEAR	L5	19 km	MPC; JPL
24453	2000 QG_{173}	—	August 31, 2000	Socorro	LINEAR	L5	28 km	MPC; JPL
24454	2000 QF_{198}	—	August 29, 2000	Socorro	LINEAR	L5 · slow	28 km	MPC; JPL
24455 Kaňuchová	2000 QF_{222}	Kaňuchová	August 21, 2000	Anderson Mesa	LONEOS	·	9.4 km	MPC; JPL
24456	2000 RO_{25}	—	September 1, 2000	Socorro	LINEAR	L5	21 km	MPC; JPL
24457	2000 RX_{76}	—	September 6, 2000	Socorro	LINEAR	H	3.4 km	MPC; JPL
24458	2000 RP_{100}	—	September 5, 2000	Anderson Mesa	LONEOS	L5 · slow	26 km	MPC; JPL
24459	2000 RF_{103}	—	September 5, 2000	Anderson Mesa	LONEOS	L5	28 km	MPC; JPL
24460	2000 RF_{105}	—	September 7, 2000	Socorro	LINEAR	EUN · slow	5.5 km	MPC; JPL
24461	2000 SZ_{3}	—	September 20, 2000	Socorro	LINEAR	·	10 km	MPC; JPL
24462	2000 SS_{107}	—	September 24, 2000	Socorro	LINEAR	·	5.5 km	MPC; JPL
24463	2000 SO_{123}	—	September 24, 2000	Socorro	LINEAR	·	12 km	MPC; JPL
24464 Williamkalb	2000 SX_{124}	Williamkalb	September 24, 2000	Socorro	LINEAR	·	3.7 km	MPC; JPL
24465	2000 SX_{155}	—	September 24, 2000	Socorro	LINEAR	H · moon	2.2 km	MPC; JPL
24466	2000 SC_{156}	—	September 24, 2000	Socorro	LINEAR	slow	11 km	MPC; JPL
24467	2000 SS_{165}	—	September 23, 2000	Socorro	LINEAR	L5	21 km	MPC; JPL
24468	2000 SY_{221}	—	September 26, 2000	Socorro	LINEAR	GEF	5.7 km	MPC; JPL
24469	2000 SN_{287}	—	September 26, 2000	Socorro	LINEAR	EUN	4.1 km	MPC; JPL
24470	2000 SJ_{310}	—	September 26, 2000	Socorro	LINEAR	L5	33 km	MPC; JPL
24471	2000 SH_{313}	—	September 27, 2000	Socorro	LINEAR	L5 · slow	29 km	MPC; JPL
24472	2000 SY_{317}	—	September 30, 2000	Socorro	LINEAR	L5	29 km	MPC; JPL
24473	2000 UK_{98}	—	October 25, 2000	Socorro	LINEAR	(2076)	5.3 km	MPC; JPL
24474 Ananthram	2000 VE_{2}	Ananthram	November 1, 2000	Socorro	LINEAR	·	3.3 km	MPC; JPL
24475	2000 VN_{2}	—	November 1, 2000	Socorro	LINEAR	AMO +1km	1.8 km	MPC; JPL
24476	2000 WE_{68}	—	November 29, 2000	Fountain Hills	C. W. Juels	EUN	4.7 km	MPC; JPL
24477	2000 WH_{87}	—	November 20, 2000	Socorro	LINEAR	EOS	8.0 km	MPC; JPL
24478	2000 WC_{145}	—	November 21, 2000	Socorro	LINEAR	EUP	19 km	MPC; JPL
24479	2000 WU_{157}	—	November 30, 2000	Socorro	LINEAR	L4	20 km	MPC; JPL
24480 Glavin	2000 WA_{191}	Glavin	November 19, 2000	Anderson Mesa	LONEOS	·	6.0 km	MPC; JPL
24481	2000 XO_{9}	—	December 1, 2000	Socorro	LINEAR	H	1.6 km	MPC; JPL
24482	2000 XV_{49}	—	December 4, 2000	Socorro	LINEAR	·	7.8 km	MPC; JPL
24483	2000 XK_{50}	—	December 4, 2000	Socorro	LINEAR	·	3.1 km	MPC; JPL
24484 Chester	2000 YV_{49}	Chester	December 30, 2000	Socorro	LINEAR	·	2.9 km	MPC; JPL
24485	2000 YL_{102}	—	December 28, 2000	Socorro	LINEAR	L4	26 km	MPC; JPL
24486	2000 YR_{102}	—	December 28, 2000	Socorro	LINEAR	L4	33 km	MPC; JPL
24487	2000 YT_{105}	—	December 28, 2000	Socorro	LINEAR	EUN	4.4 km	MPC; JPL
24488 Eliebochner	2000 YY_{111}	Eliebochner	December 30, 2000	Socorro	LINEAR	·	2.9 km	MPC; JPL
24489	2000 YC_{117}	—	December 30, 2000	Socorro	LINEAR	·	2.1 km	MPC; JPL
24490	2000 YK_{122}	—	December 28, 2000	Socorro	LINEAR	·	4.9 km	MPC; JPL
24491	2000 YT_{123}	—	December 28, 2000	Socorro	LINEAR	2:1J	9.5 km	MPC; JPL
24492 Nathanmonroe	2000 YQ_{131}	Nathanmonroe	December 30, 2000	Socorro	LINEAR	·	2.6 km	MPC; JPL
24493 McCommon	2000 YT_{131}	McCommon	December 30, 2000	Socorro	LINEAR	KOR	3.5 km	MPC; JPL
24494 Megmoulding	2000 YH_{132}	Megmoulding	December 30, 2000	Socorro	LINEAR	·	5.2 km	MPC; JPL
24495 Degroff	2001 AV_{1}	Degroff	January 2, 2001	Anderson Mesa	LONEOS	moon	2.9 km	MPC; JPL
24496	2001 AV_{17}	—	January 2, 2001	Socorro	LINEAR	·	2.6 km	MPC; JPL
24497	2001 AE_{18}	—	January 2, 2001	Socorro	LINEAR	·	13 km	MPC; JPL
24498	2001 AC_{25}	—	January 4, 2001	Socorro	LINEAR	L4	20 km	MPC; JPL
24499	2001 AL_{30}	—	January 4, 2001	Socorro	LINEAR	·	4.0 km	MPC; JPL
24500	2001 AX_{33}	—	January 4, 2001	Socorro	LINEAR	·	7.8 km	MPC; JPL

== 24501–24600 ==
back to top

Designation			Discovery			Properties		Ref
Permanent	Provisional	Named after	Date	Site	Discoverer(s)	Category	Diam.	Ref
24501	2001 AN_{37}	—	January 5, 2001	Socorro	LINEAR	L4	25 km	MPC; JPL
24502	2001 AT_{38}	—	January 1, 2001	Kitt Peak	Spacewatch	·	3.1 km	MPC; JPL
24503 Kero	2001 AJ_{42}	Kero	January 3, 2001	Anderson Mesa	LONEOS	MAR	6.1 km	MPC; JPL
24504	2001 AD_{45}	—	January 15, 2001	Oizumi	T. Kobayashi	slow	1.6 km	MPC; JPL
24505	2001 BZ	—	January 17, 2001	Oizumi	T. Kobayashi	L4	32 km	MPC; JPL
24506	2001 BS_{15}	—	January 21, 2001	Oizumi	T. Kobayashi	L4	39 km	MPC; JPL
24507	2001 BH_{18}	—	January 19, 2001	Socorro	LINEAR	·	4.4 km	MPC; JPL
24508	2001 BL_{26}	—	January 20, 2001	Socorro	LINEAR	L4	20 km	MPC; JPL
24509 Joycechai	2001 BT_{27}	Joycechai	January 20, 2001	Socorro	LINEAR	NYS	2.5 km	MPC; JPL
24510	2001 BY_{31}	—	January 20, 2001	Socorro	LINEAR	·	10 km	MPC; JPL
24511	2001 BM_{33}	—	January 20, 2001	Socorro	LINEAR	·	2.4 km	MPC; JPL
24512	2001 BK_{35}	—	January 20, 2001	Socorro	LINEAR	·	12 km	MPC; JPL
24513	2001 BL_{35}	—	January 20, 2001	Socorro	LINEAR	·	20 km	MPC; JPL
24514	2001 BB_{58}	—	January 21, 2001	Socorro	LINEAR	2:1J	8.3 km	MPC; JPL
24515	2001 BN_{58}	—	January 21, 2001	Socorro	LINEAR	fast	7.1 km	MPC; JPL
24516	2001 BB_{66}	—	January 26, 2001	Socorro	LINEAR	·	6.3 km	MPC; JPL
24517 Omattage	2001 BN_{71}	Omattage	January 29, 2001	Socorro	LINEAR	·	1.8 km	MPC; JPL
24518	2001 BR_{76}	—	January 26, 2001	Kitt Peak	Spacewatch	·	2.2 km	MPC; JPL
24519	2001 CH	—	February 1, 2001	Višnjan Observatory	K. Korlević	L4	26 km	MPC; JPL
24520 Abramson	2001 CW_{1}	Abramson	February 1, 2001	Socorro	LINEAR	slow	8.5 km	MPC; JPL
24521	2001 CZ_{1}	—	February 1, 2001	Socorro	LINEAR	·	5.2 km	MPC; JPL
24522	2001 CO_{2}	—	February 1, 2001	Socorro	LINEAR	·	3.4 km	MPC; JPL
24523 Sanaraoof	2001 CV_{3}	Sanaraoof	February 1, 2001	Socorro	LINEAR	·	2.6 km	MPC; JPL
24524 Kevinhawkins	2001 CY_{3}	Kevinhawkins	February 1, 2001	Socorro	LINEAR	·	6.1 km	MPC; JPL
24525	2001 CS_{4}	—	February 1, 2001	Socorro	LINEAR	·	3.7 km	MPC; JPL
24526 Desai	2001 CA_{5}	Desai	February 1, 2001	Socorro	LINEAR	·	3.2 km	MPC; JPL
24527	2001 CA_{6}	—	February 1, 2001	Socorro	LINEAR	·	2.2 km	MPC; JPL
24528	2001 CP_{11}	—	February 1, 2001	Socorro	LINEAR	L4	20 km	MPC; JPL
24529 Urbach	2001 CW_{17}	Urbach	February 2, 2001	Socorro	LINEAR	·	2.6 km	MPC; JPL
24530	2001 CP_{18}	—	February 2, 2001	Socorro	LINEAR	L4	26 km	MPC; JPL
24531	2001 CE_{21}	—	February 2, 2001	Socorro	LINEAR	L4	21 km	MPC; JPL
24532 Csabakiss	2001 CY_{21}	Csabakiss	February 1, 2001	Anderson Mesa	LONEOS	·	2.6 km	MPC; JPL
24533 Kokhirova	2001 CR_{27}	Kokhirova	February 2, 2001	Anderson Mesa	LONEOS	EOS	9.3 km	MPC; JPL
24534	2001 CX_{27}	—	February 2, 2001	Anderson Mesa	LONEOS	L4	30 km	MPC; JPL
24535 Neslušan	2001 CA_{28}	Neslušan	February 2, 2001	Anderson Mesa	LONEOS	MAR	2.4 km	MPC; JPL
24536	2001 CN_{33}	—	February 13, 2001	Socorro	LINEAR	L4	30 km	MPC; JPL
24537	2001 CB_{35}	—	February 13, 2001	Socorro	LINEAR	L4	31 km	MPC; JPL
24538 Charliexie	2001 DM_{5}	Charliexie	February 16, 2001	Socorro	LINEAR	·	2.1 km	MPC; JPL
24539	2001 DP_{5}	—	February 16, 2001	Socorro	LINEAR	L4	15 km	MPC; JPL
24540	2001 DJ_{16}	—	February 16, 2001	Socorro	LINEAR	·	2.6 km	MPC; JPL
24541 Hangzou	2001 DO_{16}	Hangzou	February 16, 2001	Socorro	LINEAR	·	2.7 km	MPC; JPL
24542	2001 DD_{17}	—	February 16, 2001	Socorro	LINEAR	·	5.1 km	MPC; JPL
24543	2001 DH_{19}	—	February 16, 2001	Socorro	LINEAR	·	4.9 km	MPC; JPL
24544	2001 DT_{19}	—	February 16, 2001	Socorro	LINEAR	MAR	6.6 km	MPC; JPL
24545	2001 DP_{25}	—	February 17, 2001	Socorro	LINEAR	·	3.7 km	MPC; JPL
24546 Darnell	2001 DE_{35}	Darnell	February 19, 2001	Socorro	LINEAR	·	2.3 km	MPC; JPL
24547 Stauber	2001 DV_{36}	Stauber	February 19, 2001	Socorro	LINEAR	·	1.7 km	MPC; JPL
24548 Katieeverett	2001 DW_{42}	Katieeverett	February 19, 2001	Socorro	LINEAR	·	1.9 km	MPC; JPL
24549 Jaredgoodman	2001 DB_{69}	Jaredgoodman	February 19, 2001	Socorro	LINEAR	·	6.7 km	MPC; JPL
24550	2001 DM_{71}	—	February 19, 2001	Socorro	LINEAR	CYB	8.0 km	MPC; JPL
24551	2048 P-L	—	September 24, 1960	Palomar	C. J. van Houten, I. van Houten-Groeneveld, T. Gehrels	·	9.1 km	MPC; JPL
24552	2226 P-L	—	September 24, 1960	Palomar	C. J. van Houten, I. van Houten-Groeneveld, T. Gehrels	·	2.5 km	MPC; JPL
24553	2590 P-L	—	September 24, 1960	Palomar	C. J. van Houten, I. van Houten-Groeneveld, T. Gehrels	·	3.7 km	MPC; JPL
24554	2608 P-L	—	September 24, 1960	Palomar	C. J. van Houten, I. van Houten-Groeneveld, T. Gehrels	EOS	5.5 km	MPC; JPL
24555	2839 P-L	—	September 24, 1960	Palomar	C. J. van Houten, I. van Houten-Groeneveld, T. Gehrels	·	4.4 km	MPC; JPL
24556	3514 P-L	—	October 17, 1960	Palomar	C. J. van Houten, I. van Houten-Groeneveld, T. Gehrels	·	4.0 km	MPC; JPL
24557	3521 P-L	—	October 17, 1960	Palomar	C. J. van Houten, I. van Houten-Groeneveld, T. Gehrels	·	4.0 km	MPC; JPL
24558	4037 P-L	—	September 24, 1960	Palomar	C. J. van Houten, I. van Houten-Groeneveld, T. Gehrels	V	2.8 km	MPC; JPL
24559	4148 P-L	—	September 24, 1960	Palomar	C. J. van Houten, I. van Houten-Groeneveld, T. Gehrels	·	3.3 km	MPC; JPL
24560	4517 P-L	—	September 24, 1960	Palomar	C. J. van Houten, I. van Houten-Groeneveld, T. Gehrels	·	4.3 km	MPC; JPL
24561	4646 P-L	—	September 24, 1960	Palomar	C. J. van Houten, I. van Houten-Groeneveld, T. Gehrels	·	15 km	MPC; JPL
24562	4647 P-L	—	September 24, 1960	Palomar	C. J. van Houten, I. van Houten-Groeneveld, T. Gehrels	·	4.4 km	MPC; JPL
24563	4858 P-L	—	September 24, 1960	Palomar	C. J. van Houten, I. van Houten-Groeneveld, T. Gehrels	·	4.2 km	MPC; JPL
24564	6056 P-L	—	September 24, 1960	Palomar	C. J. van Houten, I. van Houten-Groeneveld, T. Gehrels	·	4.1 km	MPC; JPL
24565	6577 P-L	—	September 24, 1960	Palomar	C. J. van Houten, I. van Houten-Groeneveld, T. Gehrels	·	5.0 km	MPC; JPL
24566	6777 P-L	—	September 24, 1960	Palomar	C. J. van Houten, I. van Houten-Groeneveld, T. Gehrels	·	6.8 km	MPC; JPL
24567	6790 P-L	—	September 24, 1960	Palomar	C. J. van Houten, I. van Houten-Groeneveld, T. Gehrels	NYS	3.0 km	MPC; JPL
24568	6794 P-L	—	September 24, 1960	Palomar	C. J. van Houten, I. van Houten-Groeneveld, T. Gehrels	NYS	2.6 km	MPC; JPL
24569	9609 P-L	—	September 24, 1960	Palomar	C. J. van Houten, I. van Houten-Groeneveld, T. Gehrels	·	2.1 km	MPC; JPL
24570	2153 T-1	—	March 25, 1971	Palomar	C. J. van Houten, I. van Houten-Groeneveld, T. Gehrels	KOR	5.0 km	MPC; JPL
24571	2179 T-1	—	March 25, 1971	Palomar	C. J. van Houten, I. van Houten-Groeneveld, T. Gehrels	V	1.6 km	MPC; JPL
24572	2221 T-1	—	March 25, 1971	Palomar	C. J. van Houten, I. van Houten-Groeneveld, T. Gehrels	KOR	3.8 km	MPC; JPL
24573	2237 T-1	—	March 25, 1971	Palomar	C. J. van Houten, I. van Houten-Groeneveld, T. Gehrels	·	3.3 km	MPC; JPL
24574	3312 T-1	—	March 26, 1971	Palomar	C. J. van Houten, I. van Houten-Groeneveld, T. Gehrels	·	2.7 km	MPC; JPL
24575	3314 T-1	—	March 26, 1971	Palomar	C. J. van Houten, I. van Houten-Groeneveld, T. Gehrels	EUN	3.2 km	MPC; JPL
24576	4406 T-1	—	March 26, 1971	Palomar	C. J. van Houten, I. van Houten-Groeneveld, T. Gehrels	·	4.3 km	MPC; JPL
24577	4841 T-1	—	May 13, 1971	Palomar	C. J. van Houten, I. van Houten-Groeneveld, T. Gehrels	EUN	5.0 km	MPC; JPL
24578	1036 T-2	—	September 29, 1973	Palomar	C. J. van Houten, I. van Houten-Groeneveld, T. Gehrels	·	5.7 km	MPC; JPL
24579	1320 T-2	—	September 29, 1973	Palomar	C. J. van Houten, I. van Houten-Groeneveld, T. Gehrels	·	3.9 km	MPC; JPL
24580	1414 T-2	—	September 30, 1973	Palomar	C. J. van Houten, I. van Houten-Groeneveld, T. Gehrels	·	3.2 km	MPC; JPL
24581	1474 T-2	—	September 30, 1973	Palomar	C. J. van Houten, I. van Houten-Groeneveld, T. Gehrels	·	2.0 km	MPC; JPL
24582	2085 T-2	—	September 29, 1973	Palomar	C. J. van Houten, I. van Houten-Groeneveld, T. Gehrels	·	4.5 km	MPC; JPL
24583	2197 T-2	—	September 29, 1973	Palomar	C. J. van Houten, I. van Houten-Groeneveld, T. Gehrels	·	4.1 km	MPC; JPL
24584	3256 T-2	—	September 30, 1973	Palomar	C. J. van Houten, I. van Houten-Groeneveld, T. Gehrels	·	2.5 km	MPC; JPL
24585	4201 T-2	—	September 29, 1973	Palomar	C. J. van Houten, I. van Houten-Groeneveld, T. Gehrels	·	5.6 km	MPC; JPL
24586	4230 T-2	—	September 29, 1973	Palomar	C. J. van Houten, I. van Houten-Groeneveld, T. Gehrels	KOR	3.9 km	MPC; JPL
24587 Kapaneus	4613 T-2	Kapaneus	September 30, 1973	Palomar	C. J. van Houten, I. van Houten-Groeneveld, T. Gehrels	L4	26 km	MPC; JPL
24588	4733 T-2	—	September 30, 1973	Palomar	C. J. van Houten, I. van Houten-Groeneveld, T. Gehrels	·	3.3 km	MPC; JPL
24589	5128 T-2	—	September 25, 1973	Palomar	C. J. van Houten, I. van Houten-Groeneveld, T. Gehrels	·	3.3 km	MPC; JPL
24590	1156 T-3	—	October 17, 1977	Palomar	C. J. van Houten, I. van Houten-Groeneveld, T. Gehrels	EOS	5.8 km	MPC; JPL
24591	2139 T-3	—	October 16, 1977	Palomar	C. J. van Houten, I. van Houten-Groeneveld, T. Gehrels	·	5.5 km	MPC; JPL
24592	3039 T-3	—	October 16, 1977	Palomar	C. J. van Houten, I. van Houten-Groeneveld, T. Gehrels	(7744)	4.2 km	MPC; JPL
24593	3041 T-3	—	October 16, 1977	Palomar	C. J. van Houten, I. van Houten-Groeneveld, T. Gehrels	·	4.0 km	MPC; JPL
24594	3138 T-3	—	October 16, 1977	Palomar	C. J. van Houten, I. van Houten-Groeneveld, T. Gehrels	·	4.6 km	MPC; JPL
24595	3230 T-3	—	October 16, 1977	Palomar	C. J. van Houten, I. van Houten-Groeneveld, T. Gehrels	HYG	4.4 km	MPC; JPL
24596	3574 T-3	—	October 12, 1977	Palomar	C. J. van Houten, I. van Houten-Groeneveld, T. Gehrels	EOS	4.7 km	MPC; JPL
24597	4292 T-3	—	October 16, 1977	Palomar	C. J. van Houten, I. van Houten-Groeneveld, T. Gehrels	·	3.4 km	MPC; JPL
24598	4366 T-3	—	October 16, 1977	Palomar	C. J. van Houten, I. van Houten-Groeneveld, T. Gehrels	·	3.0 km	MPC; JPL
24599	5099 T-3	—	October 16, 1977	Palomar	C. J. van Houten, I. van Houten-Groeneveld, T. Gehrels	EOS	4.9 km	MPC; JPL
24600 Riepe	1971 UQ	Riepe	October 26, 1971	Hamburg-Bergedorf	L. Kohoutek	·	4.2 km	MPC; JPL

== 24601–24700 ==
back to top

Designation			Discovery			Properties		Ref
Permanent	Provisional	Named after	Date	Site	Discoverer(s)	Category	Diam.	Ref
24601 Valjean	1971 UW	Valjean	October 26, 1971	Hamburg-Bergedorf	L. Kohoutek	·	3.1 km	MPC; JPL
24602 Mozzhorin	1972 TE	Mozzhorin	October 3, 1972	Nauchnij	L. V. Zhuravleva	·	4.6 km	MPC; JPL
24603 Mekistheus	1973 SQ	Mekistheus	September 24, 1973	Palomar	C. J. van Houten, I. van Houten-Groeneveld, T. Gehrels	L4	20 km	MPC; JPL
24604 Vasilermakov	1973 SP_{4}	Vasilermakov	September 27, 1973	Nauchnij	L. I. Chernykh	·	4.6 km	MPC; JPL
24605 Tsykalyuk	1975 VZ_{8}	Tsykalyuk	November 8, 1975	Nauchnij	N. S. Chernykh	·	6.7 km	MPC; JPL
24606	1976 QK_{2}	—	August 20, 1976	El Leoncito	Félix Aguilar Observatory	·	3.0 km	MPC; JPL
24607 Sevnatu	1977 PC_{1}	Sevnatu	August 14, 1977	Nauchnij	N. S. Chernykh	·	5.1 km	MPC; JPL
24608 Alexveselkov	1977 SL	Alexveselkov	September 18, 1977	Nauchnij	N. S. Chernykh	NYS	2.9 km	MPC; JPL
24609 Evgenij	1978 RA_{2}	Evgenij	September 7, 1978	Nauchnij	T. M. Smirnova	·	2.9 km	MPC; JPL
24610	1978 RA_{10}	—	September 2, 1978	La Silla	C.-I. Lagerkvist	·	2.5 km	MPC; JPL
24611 Svetochka	1978 SH_{3}	Svetochka	September 26, 1978	Nauchnij	L. V. Zhuravleva	·	4.5 km	MPC; JPL
24612	1978 UE_{6}	—	October 27, 1978	Palomar	C. M. Olmstead	EUN	4.2 km	MPC; JPL
24613	1978 VL_{3}	—	November 7, 1978	Palomar	E. F. Helin, S. J. Bus	·	3.7 km	MPC; JPL
24614	1978 VY_{3}	—	November 7, 1978	Palomar	E. F. Helin, S. J. Bus	(5)	2.7 km	MPC; JPL
24615	1978 VO_{5}	—	November 7, 1978	Palomar	E. F. Helin, S. J. Bus	·	2.2 km	MPC; JPL
24616	1978 VC_{9}	—	November 7, 1978	Palomar	E. F. Helin, S. J. Bus	·	3.2 km	MPC; JPL
24617	1978 WU	—	November 29, 1978	Palomar	S. J. Bus, C. T. Kowal	·	3.1 km	MPC; JPL
24618 Johnduffey	1978 XD_{1}	Johnduffey	December 6, 1978	Palomar	E. Bowell, Warnock, A.	·	3.5 km	MPC; JPL
24619 Danielarsham	1979 DA	Danielarsham	February 26, 1979	Kleť	A. Mrkos	·	8.2 km	MPC; JPL
24620	1979 MO_{2}	—	June 25, 1979	Siding Spring	E. F. Helin, S. J. Bus	·	1.9 km	MPC; JPL
24621	1979 MS_{4}	—	June 25, 1979	Siding Spring	E. F. Helin, S. J. Bus	·	2.8 km	MPC; JPL
24622	1979 MU_{5}	—	June 25, 1979	Siding Spring	E. F. Helin, S. J. Bus	·	2.5 km	MPC; JPL
24623	1979 MD_{8}	—	June 25, 1979	Siding Spring	E. F. Helin, S. J. Bus	GEF	4.5 km	MPC; JPL
24624	1980 FH_{4}	—	March 16, 1980	La Silla	C.-I. Lagerkvist	·	1.7 km	MPC; JPL
24625	1980 PC_{3}	—	August 8, 1980	Siding Spring	Royal Observatory Edinburgh	·	4.6 km	MPC; JPL
24626 Astrowizard	1980 TS_{3}	Astrowizard	October 9, 1980	Palomar	C. S. Shoemaker, E. M. Shoemaker	·	6.5 km	MPC; JPL
24627	1981 DT_{3}	—	February 28, 1981	Siding Spring	S. J. Bus	EOS	5.8 km	MPC; JPL
24628	1981 EG_{3}	—	March 2, 1981	Siding Spring	S. J. Bus	EOS	5.3 km	MPC; JPL
24629	1981 EA_{4}	—	March 2, 1981	Siding Spring	S. J. Bus	·	1.6 km	MPC; JPL
24630	1981 EZ_{9}	—	March 1, 1981	Siding Spring	S. J. Bus	BRA	5.4 km	MPC; JPL
24631	1981 EB_{21}	—	March 2, 1981	Siding Spring	S. J. Bus	·	5.9 km	MPC; JPL
24632	1981 ER_{24}	—	March 2, 1981	Siding Spring	S. J. Bus	·	2.3 km	MPC; JPL
24633	1981 EP_{25}	—	March 2, 1981	Siding Spring	S. J. Bus	·	3.0 km	MPC; JPL
24634	1981 EX_{29}	—	March 2, 1981	Siding Spring	S. J. Bus	·	4.2 km	MPC; JPL
24635	1981 EN_{42}	—	March 2, 1981	Siding Spring	S. J. Bus	·	2.2 km	MPC; JPL
24636	1981 QM_{2}	—	August 27, 1981	La Silla	H. Debehogne	·	6.5 km	MPC; JPL
24637 Olʹgusha	1981 RW_{4}	Olʹgusha	September 8, 1981	Nauchnij	L. V. Zhuravleva	·	3.9 km	MPC; JPL
24638	1981 UC_{23}	—	October 24, 1981	Palomar	S. J. Bus	VER	19 km	MPC; JPL
24639 Mukhametdinov	1982 US_{6}	Mukhametdinov	October 20, 1982	Nauchnij	L. G. Karachkina	·	5.4 km	MPC; JPL
24640 Omiwa	1982 XW_{1}	Omiwa	December 13, 1982	Kiso	H. Kosai, K. Furukawa	·	5.9 km	MPC; JPL
24641 Enver	1983 RS_{4}	Enver	September 1, 1983	Nauchnij	L. G. Karachkina	PHO	4.6 km	MPC; JPL
24642	1984 SA	—	September 22, 1984	Brorfelde	Copenhagen Observatory	·	2.7 km	MPC; JPL
24643 MacCready	1984 SS	MacCready	September 28, 1984	Palomar	C. S. Shoemaker, E. M. Shoemaker	·	5.6 km	MPC; JPL
24644	1985 DA	—	February 24, 1985	Palomar	E. F. Helin	H	1.5 km	MPC; JPL
24645 Šegon	1985 PF	Šegon	August 14, 1985	Anderson Mesa	E. Bowell	·	5.5 km	MPC; JPL
24646 Stober	1985 PG	Stober	August 14, 1985	Anderson Mesa	E. Bowell	RAF	4.5 km	MPC; JPL
24647 Maksimachev	1985 QL_{5}	Maksimachev	August 23, 1985	Nauchnij	N. S. Chernykh	·	2.6 km	MPC; JPL
24648 Evpatoria	1985 SG_{2}	Evpatoria	September 19, 1985	Nauchnij	N. S. Chernykh, L. I. Chernykh	·	8.5 km	MPC; JPL
24649 Balaklava	1985 SG_{3}	Balaklava	September 19, 1985	Nauchnij	N. S. Chernykh, L. I. Chernykh	·	17 km	MPC; JPL
24650	1986 QM	—	August 25, 1986	La Silla	H. Debehogne	NYS ·	6.2 km	MPC; JPL
24651	1986 QU	—	August 26, 1986	La Silla	H. Debehogne	·	9.1 km	MPC; JPL
24652	1986 QY_{1}	—	August 28, 1986	La Silla	H. Debehogne	·	9.1 km	MPC; JPL
24653	1986 RS_{5}	—	September 3, 1986	Smolyan	Bulgarian National Observatory	·	14 km	MPC; JPL
24654 Fossett	1987 KL	Fossett	May 29, 1987	Palomar	C. S. Shoemaker, E. M. Shoemaker	H	2.8 km	MPC; JPL
24655	1987 QH	—	August 25, 1987	Palomar	S. Singer-Brewster	·	3.8 km	MPC; JPL
24656	1987 QT_{7}	—	August 29, 1987	La Silla	E. W. Elst	NYS · slow	6.6 km	MPC; JPL
24657	1987 SP_{11}	—	September 17, 1987	La Silla	H. Debehogne	·	3.3 km	MPC; JPL
24658 Misch	1987 UX	Misch	October 18, 1987	Palomar	J. E. Mueller	PHO	3.9 km	MPC; JPL
24659	1988 AD_{5}	—	January 14, 1988	La Silla	H. Debehogne	·	3.7 km	MPC; JPL
24660	1988 BH_{5}	—	January 28, 1988	Siding Spring	R. H. McNaught	EUN	4.6 km	MPC; JPL
24661	1988 GQ	—	April 12, 1988	Kleť	A. Mrkos	·	6.4 km	MPC; JPL
24662 Gryll	1988 GS	Gryll	April 14, 1988	Kleť	A. Mrkos	·	3.7 km	MPC; JPL
24663 Philae	1988 PV_{1}	Philae	August 12, 1988	Haute Provence	E. W. Elst	·	3.2 km	MPC; JPL
24664	1988 RB_{1}	—	September 8, 1988	Brorfelde	P. Jensen	V	2.6 km	MPC; JPL
24665 Tolerantia	1988 RN_{3}	Tolerantia	September 8, 1988	Tautenburg Observatory	F. Börngen	·	1.8 km	MPC; JPL
24666 Miesvanrohe	1988 RZ_{3}	Miesvanrohe	September 8, 1988	Tautenburg Observatory	F. Börngen	·	4.4 km	MPC; JPL
24667	1988 RF_{4}	—	September 1, 1988	La Silla	H. Debehogne	·	2.2 km	MPC; JPL
24668	1988 TV	—	October 13, 1988	Kushiro	S. Ueda, H. Kaneda	·	3.5 km	MPC; JPL
24669	1988 VV	—	November 2, 1988	Kushiro	S. Ueda, H. Kaneda	·	4.1 km	MPC; JPL
24670	1988 VA_{5}	—	November 14, 1988	Kushiro	S. Ueda, H. Kaneda	·	3.2 km	MPC; JPL
24671 Frankmartin	1989 AD_{7}	Frankmartin	January 10, 1989	Tautenburg Observatory	F. Börngen	EOS	7.8 km	MPC; JPL
24672	1989 OJ	—	July 27, 1989	Siding Spring	R. H. McNaught	·	4.2 km	MPC; JPL
24673 Ohsugitadao	1989 SB_{1}	Ohsugitadao	September 28, 1989	Kitami	K. Endate, K. Watanabe	·	3.9 km	MPC; JPL
24674	1989 SZ_{4}	—	September 26, 1989	La Silla	E. W. Elst	·	2.4 km	MPC; JPL
24675	1989 TZ	—	October 2, 1989	Palomar	E. F. Helin	EUN	4.7 km	MPC; JPL
24676	1989 TA_{4}	—	October 7, 1989	La Silla	E. W. Elst	AGN	3.4 km	MPC; JPL
24677	1989 TH_{7}	—	October 7, 1989	La Silla	E. W. Elst	·	8.9 km	MPC; JPL
24678	1989 TR_{11}	—	October 2, 1989	Cerro Tololo	S. J. Bus	EUN	5.5 km	MPC; JPL
24679 Van Rensbergen	1989 VR_{1}	Van Rensbergen	November 3, 1989	La Silla	E. W. Elst	·	2.4 km	MPC; JPL
24680 Alleven	1989 YE_{4}	Alleven	December 30, 1989	Siding Spring	R. H. McNaught	(2076)	2.7 km	MPC; JPL
24681 Granados	1989 YE_{6}	Granados	December 29, 1989	Haute Provence	E. W. Elst	·	3.3 km	MPC; JPL
24682	1990 BH	—	January 22, 1990	Palomar	E. F. Helin	·	2.7 km	MPC; JPL
24683	1990 DV_{3}	—	February 26, 1990	La Silla	H. Debehogne	PHO	3.7 km	MPC; JPL
24684	1990 EU_{4}	—	March 2, 1990	La Silla	E. W. Elst	·	3.3 km	MPC; JPL
24685	1990 FQ	—	March 23, 1990	Palomar	E. F. Helin	·	8.6 km	MPC; JPL
24686	1990 GN	—	April 15, 1990	La Silla	E. W. Elst	·	3.4 km	MPC; JPL
24687	1990 HW	—	April 26, 1990	Palomar	E. F. Helin	H	1.7 km	MPC; JPL
24688	1990 KE_{1}	—	May 20, 1990	Siding Spring	R. H. McNaught	·	14 km	MPC; JPL
24689	1990 OH_{1}	—	July 20, 1990	Palomar	Michaud, J.	T_{j} (2.98)	17 km	MPC; JPL
24690	1990 QX_{5}	—	August 29, 1990	Palomar	H. E. Holt	JUN	7.2 km	MPC; JPL
24691	1990 RH_{3}	—	September 14, 1990	Palomar	H. E. Holt	EOS	12 km	MPC; JPL
24692	1990 RO_{7}	—	September 13, 1990	La Silla	H. Debehogne	·	2.7 km	MPC; JPL
24693	1990 SB_{2}	—	September 23, 1990	Palomar	B. Roman	·	7.1 km	MPC; JPL
24694	1990 SZ_{2}	—	September 18, 1990	Palomar	H. E. Holt	EUN	5.9 km	MPC; JPL
24695 Štyrský	1990 ST_{4}	Štyrský	September 16, 1990	Kleť	A. Mrkos	·	2.8 km	MPC; JPL
24696	1990 SC_{8}	—	September 22, 1990	La Silla	E. W. Elst	·	3.5 km	MPC; JPL
24697 Rastrelli	1990 SK_{28}	Rastrelli	September 24, 1990	Nauchnij	G. R. Kastelʹ, L. V. Zhuravleva	·	4.1 km	MPC; JPL
24698	1990 TU_{4}	—	October 9, 1990	Siding Spring	R. H. McNaught	·	5.5 km	MPC; JPL
24699 Schwekendiek	1990 TJ_{7}	Schwekendiek	October 13, 1990	Tautenburg Observatory	L. D. Schmadel, F. Börngen	·	1.7 km	MPC; JPL
24700	1990 VN_{5}	—	November 15, 1990	La Silla	E. W. Elst	MAR ·	4.8 km	MPC; JPL

== 24701–24800 ==
back to top

Designation			Discovery			Properties		Ref
Permanent	Provisional	Named after	Date	Site	Discoverer(s)	Category	Diam.	Ref
24701 Elyu-Ene	1990 VY_{5}	Elyu-Ene	November 15, 1990	La Silla	E. W. Elst	T_{j} (2.97) · 3:2	18 km	MPC; JPL
24702	1991 OR	—	July 18, 1991	Palomar	H. E. Holt	H	1.8 km	MPC; JPL
24703	1991 PA	—	August 3, 1991	Kiyosato	S. Otomo	·	8.4 km	MPC; JPL
24704	1991 PM_{4}	—	August 3, 1991	La Silla	E. W. Elst	·	2.6 km	MPC; JPL
24705	1991 PV_{4}	—	August 3, 1991	La Silla	E. W. Elst	·	7.7 km	MPC; JPL
24706	1991 PA_{5}	—	August 3, 1991	La Silla	E. W. Elst	·	2.6 km	MPC; JPL
24707	1991 PL_{5}	—	August 3, 1991	La Silla	E. W. Elst	·	3.3 km	MPC; JPL
24708	1991 PX_{5}	—	August 6, 1991	La Silla	E. W. Elst	·	3.7 km	MPC; JPL
24709 Mitau	1991 PE_{6}	Mitau	August 6, 1991	La Silla	E. W. Elst	·	9.1 km	MPC; JPL
24710	1991 PX_{14}	—	August 6, 1991	Palomar	H. E. Holt	V	2.3 km	MPC; JPL
24711 Chamisso	1991 PN_{17}	Chamisso	August 6, 1991	Tautenburg Observatory	F. Börngen	·	2.8 km	MPC; JPL
24712 Boltzmann	1991 RP_{3}	Boltzmann	September 12, 1991	Tautenburg Observatory	F. Börngen, L. D. Schmadel	·	2.3 km	MPC; JPL
24713 Ekrutt	1991 RE_{4}	Ekrutt	September 12, 1991	Tautenburg Observatory	L. D. Schmadel, F. Börngen	·	4.9 km	MPC; JPL
24714	1991 RT_{9}	—	September 10, 1991	Palomar	H. E. Holt	NYS	4.2 km	MPC; JPL
24715	1991 RZ_{15}	—	September 15, 1991	Palomar	H. E. Holt	THM	8.9 km	MPC; JPL
24716	1991 RB_{19}	—	September 14, 1991	Palomar	H. E. Holt	·	8.4 km	MPC; JPL
24717	1991 SA	—	September 16, 1991	Kiyosato	S. Otomo	·	5.6 km	MPC; JPL
24718	1991 SW	—	September 30, 1991	Siding Spring	R. H. McNaught	VER	11 km	MPC; JPL
24719	1991 SE_{1}	—	September 30, 1991	Siding Spring	R. H. McNaught	V	2.2 km	MPC; JPL
24720	1991 SV_{1}	—	September 16, 1991	Palomar	H. E. Holt	V	2.8 km	MPC; JPL
24721	1991 TJ	—	October 1, 1991	Siding Spring	R. H. McNaught	·	3.0 km	MPC; JPL
24722	1991 TK	—	October 1, 1991	Siding Spring	R. H. McNaught	·	6.5 km	MPC; JPL
24723	1991 TW_{8}	—	October 1, 1991	Kitt Peak	Spacewatch	ERI	4.1 km	MPC; JPL
24724	1991 UN	—	October 18, 1991	Kushiro	S. Ueda, H. Kaneda	·	2.6 km	MPC; JPL
24725	1991 UD_{3}	—	October 31, 1991	Kushiro	S. Ueda, H. Kaneda	·	4.8 km	MPC; JPL
24726 Nagatatetsuya	1991 VY	Nagatatetsuya	November 2, 1991	Kitami	A. Takahashi, K. Watanabe	SUL	7.8 km	MPC; JPL
24727	1991 VD_{1}	—	November 4, 1991	Kushiro	S. Ueda, H. Kaneda	·	5.3 km	MPC; JPL
24728 Scagell	1991 VO_{2}	Scagell	November 11, 1991	Stakenbridge	B. G. W. Manning	·	5.4 km	MPC; JPL
24729	1991 VE_{3}	—	November 13, 1991	Kiyosato	S. Otomo	·	3.3 km	MPC; JPL
24730	1991 VM_{5}	—	November 5, 1991	Kiyosato	S. Otomo	·	3.1 km	MPC; JPL
24731	1991 VN_{9}	—	November 4, 1991	Kitt Peak	Spacewatch	V	1.8 km	MPC; JPL
24732 Leonardcohen	1992 CL_{2}	Leonardcohen	February 2, 1992	La Silla	E. W. Elst	EUN	3.5 km	MPC; JPL
24733	1992 DM_{9}	—	February 29, 1992	La Silla	UESAC	·	2.5 km	MPC; JPL
24734 Kareness	1992 EA_{1}	Kareness	March 10, 1992	Siding Spring	D. I. Steel	·	4.4 km	MPC; JPL
24735	1992 EU_{6}	—	March 1, 1992	La Silla	UESAC	V	1.7 km	MPC; JPL
24736	1992 EV_{8}	—	March 2, 1992	La Silla	UESAC	·	5.3 km	MPC; JPL
24737	1992 ED_{14}	—	March 2, 1992	La Silla	UESAC	RAF	5.4 km	MPC; JPL
24738	1992 EK_{14}	—	March 2, 1992	La Silla	UESAC	·	3.9 km	MPC; JPL
24739	1992 EB_{15}	—	March 1, 1992	La Silla	UESAC	·	3.3 km	MPC; JPL
24740	1992 EW_{16}	—	March 1, 1992	La Silla	UESAC	·	4.2 km	MPC; JPL
24741	1992 EW_{17}	—	March 3, 1992	La Silla	UESAC	EUN	3.9 km	MPC; JPL
24742	1992 GN_{2}	—	April 4, 1992	La Silla	E. W. Elst	MIS	7.7 km	MPC; JPL
24743	1992 NF	—	July 2, 1992	Palomar	E. F. Helin	EOS	11 km	MPC; JPL
24744	1992 OD_{5}	—	July 26, 1992	La Silla	E. W. Elst	·	2.1 km	MPC; JPL
24745	1992 QY	—	August 29, 1992	Palomar	E. F. Helin	AEG	10 km	MPC; JPL
24746	1992 RH_{3}	—	September 2, 1992	La Silla	E. W. Elst	·	2.2 km	MPC; JPL
24747	1992 RG_{5}	—	September 2, 1992	La Silla	E. W. Elst	·	6.9 km	MPC; JPL
24748 Nernst	1992 ST_{13}	Nernst	September 26, 1992	Tautenburg Observatory	F. Börngen, L. D. Schmadel	·	10 km	MPC; JPL
24749 Grebel	1992 SM_{17}	Grebel	September 24, 1992	Tautenburg Observatory	L. D. Schmadel, F. Börngen	·	18 km	MPC; JPL
24750 Ohm	1992 SR_{17}	Ohm	September 24, 1992	Tautenburg Observatory	F. Börngen, L. D. Schmadel	KOR	3.5 km	MPC; JPL
24751 Kroemer	1992 SS_{24}	Kroemer	September 21, 1992	Tautenburg Observatory	F. Börngen	·	11 km	MPC; JPL
24752	1992 UN	—	October 19, 1992	Kushiro	S. Ueda, H. Kaneda	·	11 km	MPC; JPL
24753 Fujikake	1992 UU_{5}	Fujikake	October 28, 1992	Kitami	K. Endate, K. Watanabe	·	4.0 km	MPC; JPL
24754 Zellyfry	1992 UE_{6}	Zellyfry	October 31, 1992	Okutama	Hioki, T., Hayakawa, S.	·	5.0 km	MPC; JPL
24755	1992 UQ_{6}	—	October 28, 1992	Kushiro	S. Ueda, H. Kaneda	·	3.7 km	MPC; JPL
24756	1992 VF	—	November 2, 1992	Uto	F. Uto	·	2.3 km	MPC; JPL
24757 Kusano	1992 VN	Kusano	November 1, 1992	Kitami	M. Yanai, K. Watanabe	·	4.9 km	MPC; JPL
24758	1992 WZ	—	November 17, 1992	Dynic	A. Sugie	(1338) (FLO)	3.1 km	MPC; JPL
24759	1992 WQ_{1}	—	November 18, 1992	Okutama	Hioki, T., Hayakawa, S.	HNS	6.3 km	MPC; JPL
24760	1992 YY_{1}	—	December 18, 1992	Caussols	E. W. Elst	·	2.9 km	MPC; JPL
24761 Ahau	1993 BW_{2}	Ahau	January 28, 1993	Palomar	C. S. Shoemaker, E. M. Shoemaker	APO +1km	1.2 km	MPC; JPL
24762	1993 DE_{1}	—	February 25, 1993	Oizumi	T. Kobayashi	ADE	9.4 km	MPC; JPL
24763	1993 DV_{2}	—	February 20, 1993	Caussols	E. W. Elst	·	3.8 km	MPC; JPL
24764	1993 DX_{2}	—	February 20, 1993	Caussols	E. W. Elst	V	2.6 km	MPC; JPL
24765	1993 FE_{8}	—	March 17, 1993	La Silla	UESAC	·	6.9 km	MPC; JPL
24766	1993 FW_{9}	—	March 17, 1993	La Silla	UESAC	·	4.7 km	MPC; JPL
24767	1993 FE_{12}	—	March 17, 1993	La Silla	UESAC	NYS	2.7 km	MPC; JPL
24768	1993 FC_{13}	—	March 17, 1993	La Silla	UESAC	NYS	4.5 km	MPC; JPL
24769	1993 FN_{24}	—	March 21, 1993	La Silla	UESAC	·	2.4 km	MPC; JPL
24770	1993 FG_{28}	—	March 21, 1993	La Silla	UESAC	·	3.8 km	MPC; JPL
24771	1993 FA_{32}	—	March 19, 1993	La Silla	UESAC	·	3.3 km	MPC; JPL
24772	1993 FL_{33}	—	March 19, 1993	La Silla	UESAC	·	3.5 km	MPC; JPL
24773	1993 FQ_{35}	—	March 19, 1993	La Silla	UESAC	NYS	4.2 km	MPC; JPL
24774	1993 FE_{38}	—	March 19, 1993	La Silla	UESAC	·	2.5 km	MPC; JPL
24775	1993 FT_{42}	—	March 19, 1993	La Silla	UESAC	NYS	4.3 km	MPC; JPL
24776	1993 FR_{43}	—	March 19, 1993	La Silla	UESAC	·	2.5 km	MPC; JPL
24777	1993 JY	—	May 14, 1993	La Silla	E. W. Elst	EUN	4.1 km	MPC; JPL
24778 Nemsu	1993 KW_{1}	Nemsu	May 24, 1993	Palomar	C. S. Shoemaker, D. H. Levy	H	1.7 km	MPC; JPL
24779 Presque Isle	1993 OD_{2}	Presque Isle	July 23, 1993	Palomar	C. S. Shoemaker, D. H. Levy	·	4.7 km	MPC; JPL
24780	1993 QA_{1}	—	August 19, 1993	Palomar	E. F. Helin	·	4.4 km	MPC; JPL
24781	1993 RU_{3}	—	September 12, 1993	Palomar	PCAS	·	6.7 km	MPC; JPL
24782	1993 SO_{7}	—	September 17, 1993	La Silla	E. W. Elst	·	1.4 km	MPC; JPL
24783	1993 SQ_{13}	—	September 16, 1993	La Silla	H. Debehogne, E. W. Elst	AST	6.9 km	MPC; JPL
24784	1993 TV_{12}	—	October 13, 1993	Palomar	H. E. Holt	GEF	4.9 km	MPC; JPL
24785	1993 TM_{22}	—	October 9, 1993	La Silla	E. W. Elst	·	6.1 km	MPC; JPL
24786	1993 TM_{24}	—	October 9, 1993	La Silla	E. W. Elst	·	5.7 km	MPC; JPL
24787	1993 TJ_{27}	—	October 9, 1993	La Silla	E. W. Elst	·	4.8 km	MPC; JPL
24788	1993 TL_{28}	—	October 9, 1993	La Silla	E. W. Elst	·	5.7 km	MPC; JPL
24789	1993 TZ_{29}	—	October 9, 1993	La Silla	E. W. Elst	KOR	3.7 km	MPC; JPL
24790	1993 TM_{31}	—	October 9, 1993	La Silla	E. W. Elst	KOR	4.7 km	MPC; JPL
24791	1993 TK_{37}	—	October 9, 1993	La Silla	E. W. Elst	·	5.1 km	MPC; JPL
24792	1993 TB_{46}	—	October 10, 1993	La Silla	H. Debehogne	THM	5.0 km	MPC; JPL
24793	1993 UT	—	October 22, 1993	Oohira	T. Urata	(14916)	6.1 km	MPC; JPL
24794 Kurland	1993 UB_{7}	Kurland	October 20, 1993	La Silla	E. W. Elst	·	14 km	MPC; JPL
24795	1994 AC_{17}	—	January 5, 1994	Kushiro	S. Ueda, H. Kaneda	·	5.1 km	MPC; JPL
24796	1994 CD_{18}	—	February 8, 1994	La Silla	E. W. Elst	·	2.3 km	MPC; JPL
24797	1994 PD_{2}	—	August 9, 1994	Palomar	PCAS	·	4.7 km	MPC; JPL
24798	1994 PF_{2}	—	August 9, 1994	Palomar	PCAS	·	3.2 km	MPC; JPL
24799	1994 PW_{3}	—	August 10, 1994	La Silla	E. W. Elst	·	2.2 km	MPC; JPL
24800	1994 PC_{13}	—	August 10, 1994	La Silla	E. W. Elst	·	2.0 km	MPC; JPL

== 24801–24900 ==
back to top

Designation			Discovery			Properties		Ref
Permanent	Provisional	Named after	Date	Site	Discoverer(s)	Category	Diam.	Ref
24801	1994 PQ_{15}	—	August 10, 1994	La Silla	E. W. Elst	·	5.4 km	MPC; JPL
24802	1994 PC_{16}	—	August 10, 1994	La Silla	E. W. Elst	·	5.3 km	MPC; JPL
24803	1994 PP_{18}	—	August 12, 1994	La Silla	E. W. Elst	·	2.9 km	MPC; JPL
24804	1994 PS_{31}	—	August 12, 1994	La Silla	E. W. Elst	·	3.0 km	MPC; JPL
24805	1994 RL_{1}	—	September 4, 1994	Oizumi	T. Kobayashi	EUN	3.9 km	MPC; JPL
24806	1994 RH_{9}	—	September 12, 1994	Kitt Peak	Spacewatch	·	4.4 km	MPC; JPL
24807	1994 SS_{8}	—	September 28, 1994	Kitt Peak	Spacewatch	·	3.7 km	MPC; JPL
24808 Iwanaguchi	1994 TN_{1}	Iwanaguchi	October 2, 1994	Kitami	K. Endate, K. Watanabe	·	10 km	MPC; JPL
24809	1994 TW_{3}	—	October 8, 1994	Palomar	E. F. Helin	H	2.3 km	MPC; JPL
24810	1994 UE_{8}	—	October 28, 1994	Kitt Peak	Spacewatch	·	5.3 km	MPC; JPL
24811	1994 VB	—	November 1, 1994	Oizumi	T. Kobayashi	EUN	3.7 km	MPC; JPL
24812	1994 VH	—	November 1, 1994	Oizumi	T. Kobayashi	·	3.2 km	MPC; JPL
24813	1994 VL_{1}	—	November 4, 1994	Oizumi	T. Kobayashi	ADE	6.7 km	MPC; JPL
24814	1994 VW_{1}	—	November 10, 1994	Siding Spring	G. J. Garradd	·	2.7 km	MPC; JPL
24815	1994 VQ_{6}	—	November 7, 1994	Kushiro	S. Ueda, H. Kaneda	H	1.4 km	MPC; JPL
24816 Einagahideo	1994 VU_{6}	Einagahideo	November 1, 1994	Kitami	K. Endate, K. Watanabe	EUN	4.5 km	MPC; JPL
24817	1994 WJ	—	November 25, 1994	Oizumi	T. Kobayashi	·	3.4 km	MPC; JPL
24818 Menichelli	1994 WX	Menichelli	November 23, 1994	San Marcello	L. Tesi, A. Boattini	HYG	4.9 km	MPC; JPL
24819	1994 XY_{4}	—	December 6, 1994	Siding Spring	R. H. McNaught	H	2.3 km	MPC; JPL
24820	1994 YK_{1}	—	December 31, 1994	Oizumi	T. Kobayashi	·	9.2 km	MPC; JPL
24821	1995 BJ_{11}	—	January 29, 1995	Kitt Peak	Spacewatch	·	7.0 km	MPC; JPL
24822	1995 BW_{11}	—	January 29, 1995	Kitt Peak	Spacewatch	·	12 km	MPC; JPL
24823	1995 DC_{10}	—	February 25, 1995	Kitt Peak	Spacewatch	EOS	5.8 km	MPC; JPL
24824	1995 GL_{7}	—	April 4, 1995	Xinglong	SCAP	·	6.8 km	MPC; JPL
24825 Ebeshireiko	1995 QB_{2}	Ebeshireiko	August 21, 1995	Kitami	K. Endate, K. Watanabe	slow	4.0 km	MPC; JPL
24826 Pascoli	1995 QN_{2}	Pascoli	August 22, 1995	Colleverde	V. S. Casulli	V	2.0 km	MPC; JPL
24827 Maryphil	1995 RA	Maryphil	September 2, 1995	Catalina Station	T. B. Spahr	PHO	5.9 km	MPC; JPL
24828	1995 SE_{1}	—	September 20, 1995	Church Stretton	S. P. Laurie	·	3.6 km	MPC; JPL
24829 Berounurbi	1995 SH_{1}	Berounurbi	September 22, 1995	Ondřejov	L. Kotková	V	1.4 km	MPC; JPL
24830 Kawanotomoyoshi	1995 ST_{3}	Kawanotomoyoshi	September 20, 1995	Kitami	K. Endate, K. Watanabe	·	2.6 km	MPC; JPL
24831	1995 SX_{4}	—	September 21, 1995	Kushiro	S. Ueda, H. Kaneda	·	2.9 km	MPC; JPL
24832	1995 SU_{5}	—	September 25, 1995	Xinglong	SCAP	·	3.4 km	MPC; JPL
24833	1995 SM_{21}	—	September 19, 1995	Kitt Peak	Spacewatch	V	1.7 km	MPC; JPL
24834	1995 SY_{30}	—	September 20, 1995	Kitt Peak	Spacewatch	V	1.5 km	MPC; JPL
24835	1995 SM_{55}	—	September 19, 1995	Steward Observatory	Danzl, N.	Haumea	187 km	MPC; JPL
24836	1995 TO_{1}	—	October 14, 1995	Xinglong	SCAP	(5)	2.8 km	MPC; JPL
24837 Mšecké Žehrovice	1995 UQ_{1}	Mšecké Žehrovice	October 22, 1995	Kleť	M. Tichý	·	3.9 km	MPC; JPL
24838 Abilunon	1995 UJ_{2}	Abilunon	October 23, 1995	Kleť	M. Tichý	·	3.9 km	MPC; JPL
24839	1995 UE_{4}	—	October 20, 1995	Oizumi	T. Kobayashi	·	4.9 km	MPC; JPL
24840	1995 UN_{8}	—	October 27, 1995	Oizumi	T. Kobayashi	·	2.6 km	MPC; JPL
24841 Imatani	1995 UY_{8}	Imatani	October 30, 1995	Kitami	K. Endate, K. Watanabe	·	6.3 km	MPC; JPL
24842	1995 UQ_{46}	—	October 20, 1995	Caussols	E. W. Elst	·	2.7 km	MPC; JPL
24843	1995 VZ	—	November 15, 1995	Oizumi	T. Kobayashi	NYS	3.6 km	MPC; JPL
24844 Hwanginjoon	1995 VM_{1}	Hwanginjoon	November 15, 1995	Kitami	K. Endate, K. Watanabe	BAP	5.2 km	MPC; JPL
24845	1995 VP_{17}	—	November 15, 1995	Kitt Peak	Spacewatch	·	2.7 km	MPC; JPL
24846	1995 WM	—	November 16, 1995	Oizumi	T. Kobayashi	·	3.1 km	MPC; JPL
24847 Polesný	1995 WE_{6}	Polesný	November 26, 1995	Kleť	Kleť	NYS	2.6 km	MPC; JPL
24848	1995 WO_{41}	—	November 28, 1995	Kitt Peak	Spacewatch	·	4.3 km	MPC; JPL
24849	1995 WQ_{41}	—	November 16, 1995	Kushiro	S. Ueda, H. Kaneda	·	2.3 km	MPC; JPL
24850 Biagiomarin	1995 XA	Biagiomarin	December 1, 1995	Farra d'Isonzo	Farra d'Isonzo	·	3.0 km	MPC; JPL
24851	1995 XE	—	December 2, 1995	Oizumi	T. Kobayashi	MAR	7.1 km	MPC; JPL
24852	1995 XX_{4}	—	December 14, 1995	Kitt Peak	Spacewatch	·	3.5 km	MPC; JPL
24853	1995 YJ	—	December 17, 1995	Oizumi	T. Kobayashi	·	4.5 km	MPC; JPL
24854	1995 YU	—	December 19, 1995	Oizumi	T. Kobayashi	·	4.3 km	MPC; JPL
24855	1995 YM_{4}	—	December 22, 1995	Nachi-Katsuura	Y. Shimizu, T. Urata	·	4.5 km	MPC; JPL
24856 Messidoro	1996 AA_{4}	Messidoro	January 15, 1996	Cima Ekar	M. Tombelli, C. Casacci	CLO	4.5 km	MPC; JPL
24857 Sperello	1996 AH_{4}	Sperello	January 15, 1996	Cima Ekar	U. Munari, M. Tombelli	·	1.6 km	MPC; JPL
24858 Diethelm	1996 BB_{1}	Diethelm	January 21, 1996	Ondřejov	M. Wolf, P. Pravec	(5)	3.3 km	MPC; JPL
24859	1996 BP_{11}	—	January 24, 1996	Kitt Peak	Spacewatch	·	8.3 km	MPC; JPL
24860	1996 CK_{1}	—	February 11, 1996	Oizumi	T. Kobayashi	·	4.9 km	MPC; JPL
24861	1996 DE_{1}	—	February 22, 1996	Sormano	A. Testa, Ghezzi, P.	·	3.3 km	MPC; JPL
24862 Hromec	1996 DC_{3}	Hromec	February 27, 1996	Modra	L. Kornoš, P. Kolény	(5)	3.9 km	MPC; JPL
24863 Cheli	1996 EB	Cheli	March 2, 1996	Farra d'Isonzo	Farra d'Isonzo	EUN	5.3 km	MPC; JPL
24864	1996 EB_{1}	—	March 15, 1996	Haleakala	NEAT	AGN	4.1 km	MPC; JPL
24865	1996 EG_{1}	—	March 15, 1996	Haleakala	NEAT	fast	5.6 km	MPC; JPL
24866	1996 ER_{1}	—	March 15, 1996	Haleakala	NEAT	·	20 km	MPC; JPL
24867	1996 EB_{7}	—	March 11, 1996	Kitt Peak	Spacewatch	·	5.2 km	MPC; JPL
24868	1996 EY_{7}	—	March 11, 1996	Kitt Peak	Spacewatch	·	6.0 km	MPC; JPL
24869	1996 FZ	—	March 18, 1996	Haleakala	NEAT	(11882)	3.5 km	MPC; JPL
24870	1996 FJ_{1}	—	March 19, 1996	Haleakala	NEAT	·	6.6 km	MPC; JPL
24871	1996 GV_{17}	—	April 15, 1996	La Silla	E. W. Elst	·	6.8 km	MPC; JPL
24872	1996 GT_{19}	—	April 15, 1996	La Silla	E. W. Elst	EOS	6.4 km	MPC; JPL
24873	1996 GG_{20}	—	April 15, 1996	La Silla	E. W. Elst	KOR	5.2 km	MPC; JPL
24874	1996 HF_{14}	—	April 17, 1996	La Silla	E. W. Elst	KOR	4.6 km	MPC; JPL
24875	1996 HX_{16}	—	April 18, 1996	La Silla	E. W. Elst	KOR	4.4 km	MPC; JPL
24876	1996 HO_{19}	—	April 18, 1996	La Silla	E. W. Elst	THM	8.1 km	MPC; JPL
24877	1996 HW_{20}	—	April 18, 1996	La Silla	E. W. Elst	THM	6.1 km	MPC; JPL
24878	1996 HP_{25}	—	April 20, 1996	La Silla	E. W. Elst	TIR · slow ·	9.7 km	MPC; JPL
24879	1996 KO_{5}	—	May 21, 1996	Haleakala	NEAT	·	9.3 km	MPC; JPL
24880	1996 OP	—	July 21, 1996	Haleakala	NEAT	THM	7.3 km	MPC; JPL
24881	1996 PQ_{2}	—	August 10, 1996	Haleakala	NEAT	H	1.6 km	MPC; JPL
24882	1996 RK_{30}	—	September 13, 1996	La Silla	Uppsala-DLR Trojan Survey	L4	19 km	MPC; JPL
24883	1996 VG_{9}	—	November 13, 1996	Xinglong	SCAP	H	2.3 km	MPC; JPL
24884	1996 XL_{5}	—	December 7, 1996	Oizumi	T. Kobayashi	EUN	4.4 km	MPC; JPL
24885	1996 XQ_{5}	—	December 7, 1996	Oizumi	T. Kobayashi	·	2.6 km	MPC; JPL
24886	1996 XJ_{12}	—	December 4, 1996	Kitt Peak	Spacewatch	·	2.6 km	MPC; JPL
24887	1996 XT_{19}	—	December 11, 1996	Oizumi	T. Kobayashi	·	2.1 km	MPC; JPL
24888	1996 XS_{23}	—	December 8, 1996	Catalina Station	C. W. Hergenrother	PHO	3.2 km	MPC; JPL
24889 Tamurahosinomura	1996 XU_{32}	Tamurahosinomura	December 11, 1996	Geisei	T. Seki	·	2.5 km	MPC; JPL
24890 Amaliafinzi	1996 XV_{32}	Amaliafinzi	December 4, 1996	Cima Ekar	M. Tombelli, C. Casacci	·	5.4 km	MPC; JPL
24891	1997 AT_{2}	—	January 4, 1997	Oizumi	T. Kobayashi	·	2.8 km	MPC; JPL
24892	1997 AD_{3}	—	January 4, 1997	Oizumi	T. Kobayashi	·	3.0 km	MPC; JPL
24893	1997 AK_{5}	—	January 7, 1997	Oizumi	T. Kobayashi	·	2.6 km	MPC; JPL
24894	1997 AG_{8}	—	January 2, 1997	Kitt Peak	Spacewatch	·	3.3 km	MPC; JPL
24895	1997 AC_{13}	—	January 9, 1997	Nachi-Katsuura	Y. Shimizu, T. Urata	·	2.9 km	MPC; JPL
24896	1997 AT_{14}	—	January 12, 1997	Haleakala	NEAT	·	2.3 km	MPC; JPL
24897	1997 AA_{17}	—	January 13, 1997	Haleakala	NEAT	·	2.3 km	MPC; JPL
24898 Alanholmes	1997 AR_{17}	Alanholmes	January 14, 1997	Farra d'Isonzo	Farra d'Isonzo	·	2.4 km	MPC; JPL
24899 Dominiona	1997 AU_{17}	Dominiona	January 14, 1997	NRC-DAO	G. C. L. Aikman	·	2.7 km	MPC; JPL
24900	1997 AZ_{17}	—	January 15, 1997	Oizumi	T. Kobayashi	·	3.9 km	MPC; JPL

== 24901–25000 ==
back to top

Designation			Discovery			Properties		Ref
Permanent	Provisional	Named after	Date	Site	Discoverer(s)	Category	Diam.	Ref
24901	1997 AV_{20}	—	January 11, 1997	Kitt Peak	Spacewatch	·	2.2 km	MPC; JPL
24902	1997 AR_{22}	—	January 11, 1997	Xinglong	SCAP	·	2.9 km	MPC; JPL
24903	1997 AS_{22}	—	January 11, 1997	Xinglong	SCAP	V	3.8 km	MPC; JPL
24904	1997 BM_{8}	—	January 31, 1997	Kitt Peak	Spacewatch	·	2.6 km	MPC; JPL
24905	1997 CO_{1}	—	February 1, 1997	Oizumi	T. Kobayashi	NYS	4.3 km	MPC; JPL
24906	1997 CG_{4}	—	February 4, 1997	Haleakala	NEAT	V	2.3 km	MPC; JPL
24907 Alfredhaar	1997 CO_{4}	Alfredhaar	February 4, 1997	Prescott	P. G. Comba	·	3.1 km	MPC; JPL
24908	1997 CE_{22}	—	February 13, 1997	Oizumi	T. Kobayashi	·	4.2 km	MPC; JPL
24909	1997 CY_{28}	—	February 7, 1997	Xinglong	SCAP	V	2.6 km	MPC; JPL
24910 Haruoando	1997 CK_{29}	Haruoando	February 14, 1997	Nanyo	T. Okuni	·	2.8 km	MPC; JPL
24911 Kojimashigemi	1997 DU	Kojimashigemi	February 27, 1997	Kitami	K. Endate, K. Watanabe	V	2.2 km	MPC; JPL
24912	1997 EB_{1}	—	March 3, 1997	Kitt Peak	Spacewatch	V	2.0 km	MPC; JPL
24913	1997 EQ_{2}	—	March 4, 1997	Oizumi	T. Kobayashi	·	2.9 km	MPC; JPL
24914	1997 EZ_{2}	—	March 4, 1997	Oizumi	T. Kobayashi	V	2.2 km	MPC; JPL
24915	1997 EC_{6}	—	March 7, 1997	Oizumi	T. Kobayashi	NYS	5.0 km	MPC; JPL
24916 Stelzhamer	1997 EK_{11}	Stelzhamer	March 7, 1997	Davidschlag	E. Meyer	·	2.4 km	MPC; JPL
24917	1997 EH_{12}	—	March 3, 1997	Kitt Peak	Spacewatch	V	1.9 km	MPC; JPL
24918 Tedkooser	1997 EO_{17}	Tedkooser	March 10, 1997	Lime Creek	R. Linderholm	·	3.0 km	MPC; JPL
24919 Teruyoshi	1997 ER_{17}	Teruyoshi	March 3, 1997	Kitami	K. Endate, K. Watanabe	·	3.1 km	MPC; JPL
24920	1997 EE_{23}	—	March 2, 1997	Xinglong	SCAP	V	3.1 km	MPC; JPL
24921	1997 EE_{32}	—	March 11, 1997	Kitt Peak	Spacewatch	NYS	3.3 km	MPC; JPL
24922 Bechtel	1997 EH_{33}	Bechtel	March 4, 1997	Socorro	LINEAR	·	3.8 km	MPC; JPL
24923 Claralouisa	1997 EB_{37}	Claralouisa	March 5, 1997	Socorro	LINEAR	·	3.0 km	MPC; JPL
24924	1997 EY_{45}	—	March 15, 1997	Xinglong	SCAP	NYS	4.5 km	MPC; JPL
24925	1997 FW	—	March 18, 1997	Xinglong	SCAP	·	3.0 km	MPC; JPL
24926 Jinpan	1997 GB_{8}	Jinpan	April 2, 1997	Socorro	LINEAR	·	3.5 km	MPC; JPL
24927 Brianpalmer	1997 GP_{12}	Brianpalmer	April 3, 1997	Socorro	LINEAR	NYS	5.1 km	MPC; JPL
24928 Susanbehel	1997 GK_{13}	Susanbehel	April 3, 1997	Socorro	LINEAR	·	4.8 km	MPC; JPL
24929	1997 GX_{15}	—	April 3, 1997	Socorro	LINEAR	·	2.3 km	MPC; JPL
24930 Annajamison	1997 GL_{17}	Annajamison	April 3, 1997	Socorro	LINEAR	·	4.7 km	MPC; JPL
24931 Noeth	1997 GO_{18}	Noeth	April 3, 1997	Socorro	LINEAR	·	2.8 km	MPC; JPL
24932	1997 GW_{22}	—	April 6, 1997	Socorro	LINEAR	·	2.9 km	MPC; JPL
24933	1997 GK_{25}	—	April 8, 1997	Kitt Peak	Spacewatch	NYS	4.1 km	MPC; JPL
24934 Natecovert	1997 GK_{36}	Natecovert	April 6, 1997	Socorro	LINEAR	EUN	5.3 km	MPC; JPL
24935 Godfreyhardy	1997 HP_{2}	Godfreyhardy	April 28, 1997	Prescott	P. G. Comba	·	2.7 km	MPC; JPL
24936	1997 HX_{7}	—	April 30, 1997	Socorro	LINEAR	MAR	7.4 km	MPC; JPL
24937	1997 HD_{9}	—	April 30, 1997	Socorro	LINEAR	·	1.9 km	MPC; JPL
24938	1997 HY_{9}	—	April 30, 1997	Socorro	LINEAR	·	5.6 km	MPC; JPL
24939 Chiminello	1997 JR	Chiminello	May 1, 1997	Bologna	San Vittore	·	5.1 km	MPC; JPL
24940 Sankichiyama	1997 JY_{4}	Sankichiyama	May 1, 1997	Nanyo	T. Okuni	·	4.8 km	MPC; JPL
24941	1997 JM_{14}	—	May 3, 1997	La Silla	E. W. Elst	·	2.7 km	MPC; JPL
24942	1997 JA_{15}	—	May 3, 1997	La Silla	E. W. Elst	(5)	2.8 km	MPC; JPL
24943	1997 JY_{17}	—	May 3, 1997	La Silla	E. W. Elst	·	3.3 km	MPC; JPL
24944 Harish-Chandra	1997 LZ_{4}	Harish-Chandra	June 11, 1997	Prescott	P. G. Comba	·	5.0 km	MPC; JPL
24945 Houziaux	1997 LH_{9}	Houziaux	June 7, 1997	La Silla	E. W. Elst	·	2.3 km	MPC; JPL
24946 Foscolo	1997 NQ	Foscolo	July 1, 1997	Colleverde	V. S. Casulli	EUN	5.4 km	MPC; JPL
24947 Hausdorff	1997 NU_{1}	Hausdorff	July 7, 1997	Prescott	P. G. Comba	KOR	6.1 km	MPC; JPL
24948 Babote	1997 NU_{6}	Babote	July 9, 1997	Pises	Pises	GEF	4.2 km	MPC; JPL
24949 Klačka	1997 PZ_{1}	Klačka	August 4, 1997	Modra	A. Galád, Pravda, A.	·	4.9 km	MPC; JPL
24950 Nikhilas	1997 QF	Nikhilas	August 23, 1997	Kleť	Z. Moravec	slow	6.6 km	MPC; JPL
24951	1997 QK	—	August 24, 1997	Kleť	Z. Moravec	·	6.5 km	MPC; JPL
24952	1997 QJ_{4}	—	August 28, 1997	Mauna Kea	J. X. Luu, C. A. Trujillo, D. C. Jewitt, Berney, K.	plutino	154 km	MPC; JPL
24953	1997 SG_{7}	—	September 23, 1997	Kitt Peak	Spacewatch	THM	7.7 km	MPC; JPL
24954	1997 SL_{7}	—	September 23, 1997	Kitt Peak	Spacewatch	·	6.0 km	MPC; JPL
24955	1997 SK_{10}	—	September 26, 1997	Xinglong	SCAP	·	7.2 km	MPC; JPL
24956 Qiannan	1997 SN_{10}	Qiannan	September 26, 1997	Xinglong	SCAP	HYG	8.8 km	MPC; JPL
24957	1997 SF_{16}	—	September 27, 1997	Uenohara	N. Kawasato	·	8.1 km	MPC; JPL
24958	1997 SS_{31}	—	September 28, 1997	Woomera	F. B. Zoltowski	·	10 km	MPC; JPL
24959 Zielenbach	1997 TR	Zielenbach	October 3, 1997	Modra	A. Galád, Pravda, A.	·	7.2 km	MPC; JPL
24960 Usukikenichi	1997 TV_{17}	Usukikenichi	October 6, 1997	Kitami	K. Endate, K. Watanabe	·	12 km	MPC; JPL
24961	1997 TO_{24}	—	October 8, 1997	Xinglong	SCAP	slow	8.5 km	MPC; JPL
24962 Kenjitoba	1997 UX_{8}	Kenjitoba	October 27, 1997	Kuma Kogen	A. Nakamura	HYG	10 km	MPC; JPL
24963	1997 UB_{11}	—	October 26, 1997	Oohira	T. Urata	·	16 km	MPC; JPL
24964	1997 UY_{20}	—	October 27, 1997	Xinglong	SCAP	·	8.0 km	MPC; JPL
24965 Akayu	1997 WC_{2}	Akayu	November 19, 1997	Nanyo	T. Okuni	·	7.7 km	MPC; JPL
24966	1997 YB_{3}	—	December 24, 1997	Oizumi	T. Kobayashi	NYS	4.2 km	MPC; JPL
24967 Frištenský	1998 AX_{8}	Frištenský	January 14, 1998	Ondřejov	L. Kotková	·	6.6 km	MPC; JPL
24968 Chernyakhovsky	1998 BY_{12}	Chernyakhovsky	January 23, 1998	Socorro	LINEAR	·	2.8 km	MPC; JPL
24969 Lucafini	1998 CD_{2}	Lucafini	February 13, 1998	San Marcello	L. Tesi, A. Boattini	MAR	4.6 km	MPC; JPL
24970	1998 FC_{12}	—	March 25, 1998	Haleakala	NEAT	·	5.1 km	MPC; JPL
24971	1998 FG_{77}	—	March 24, 1998	Socorro	LINEAR	·	3.9 km	MPC; JPL
24972	1998 FC_{116}	—	March 31, 1998	Socorro	LINEAR	PHO	3.3 km	MPC; JPL
24973	1998 GD_{7}	—	April 2, 1998	Socorro	LINEAR	·	9.3 km	MPC; JPL
24974 Macúch	1998 HG_{3}	Macúch	April 21, 1998	Modra	L. Kornoš, P. Kolény	·	2.2 km	MPC; JPL
24975	1998 HO_{38}	—	April 20, 1998	Socorro	LINEAR	·	2.1 km	MPC; JPL
24976 Jurajtoth	1998 HE_{51}	Jurajtoth	April 25, 1998	Anderson Mesa	LONEOS	·	2.9 km	MPC; JPL
24977 Tongzhan	1998 HE_{87}	Tongzhan	April 21, 1998	Socorro	LINEAR	·	2.1 km	MPC; JPL
24978	1998 HJ_{151}	—	April 28, 1998	Mauna Kea	J. X. Luu, C. A. Trujillo, D. J. Tholen, D. C. Jewitt	cubewano (cold)	119 km	MPC; JPL
24979	1998 JB_{2}	—	May 1, 1998	Haleakala	NEAT	·	4.4 km	MPC; JPL
24980	1998 KF_{2}	—	May 22, 1998	Socorro	LINEAR	PHO	10 km	MPC; JPL
24981 Shigekimurakami	1998 KB_{5}	Shigekimurakami	May 22, 1998	Kuma Kogen	A. Nakamura	·	2.1 km	MPC; JPL
24982	1998 KB_{34}	—	May 22, 1998	Socorro	LINEAR	·	7.5 km	MPC; JPL
24983	1998 KZ_{38}	—	May 22, 1998	Socorro	LINEAR	EUN	5.7 km	MPC; JPL
24984 Usui	1998 KQ_{42}	Usui	May 27, 1998	Anderson Mesa	LONEOS	·	2.5 km	MPC; JPL
24985 Benuri	1998 KW_{45}	Benuri	May 22, 1998	Socorro	LINEAR	·	2.0 km	MPC; JPL
24986 Yalefan	1998 KS_{46}	Yalefan	May 22, 1998	Socorro	LINEAR	·	3.3 km	MPC; JPL
24987	1998 KA_{65}	—	May 22, 1998	Socorro	LINEAR	·	3.0 km	MPC; JPL
24988 Alainmilsztajn	1998 MM_{2}	Alainmilsztajn	June 19, 1998	Caussols	ODAS	·	2.2 km	MPC; JPL
24989	1998 MG_{13}	—	June 19, 1998	Socorro	LINEAR	·	4.5 km	MPC; JPL
24990	1998 MA_{26}	—	June 24, 1998	Socorro	LINEAR	·	3.1 km	MPC; JPL
24991	1998 ML_{31}	—	June 24, 1998	Socorro	LINEAR	·	2.4 km	MPC; JPL
24992	1998 MC_{32}	—	June 24, 1998	Socorro	LINEAR	·	3.4 km	MPC; JPL
24993	1998 MC_{34}	—	June 24, 1998	Socorro	LINEAR	·	2.1 km	MPC; JPL
24994 Prettyman	1998 MZ_{37}	Prettyman	June 23, 1998	Anderson Mesa	LONEOS	·	3.5 km	MPC; JPL
24995	1998 OQ	—	July 20, 1998	Caussols	ODAS	·	3.1 km	MPC; JPL
24996 Zerocalcare	1998 OD_{1}	Zerocalcare	July 20, 1998	San Marcello	V. Goretti, L. Tesi	V	2.2 km	MPC; JPL
24997 Petergabriel	1998 OO_{3}	Petergabriel	July 23, 1998	Caussols	ODAS	·	3.3 km	MPC; JPL
24998 Hermite	1998 OQ_{4}	Hermite	July 28, 1998	Prescott	P. G. Comba	·	2.1 km	MPC; JPL
24999 Hieronymus	1998 OY_{4}	Hieronymus	July 24, 1998	Ondřejov	P. Pravec	·	3.8 km	MPC; JPL
25000 Astrometria	1998 OW_{5}	Astrometria	July 28, 1998	Prescott	P. G. Comba	·	17 km	MPC; JPL

back to top

== See also ==
- Meanings of minor-planet names: 24001–25000
