= Yocum, Arkansas =

Community in Arkansas, US

Coordinates: 36°25′10″N 93°24′48″W

Yocum is a community in Carroll County in northwest Arkansas, United States. The community is located on Arkansas Highway 103 and the west bank of Yocum Creek. The site is three miles southeast of Oak Grove and six miles north of Green Forest.

John Yocum settled in the area in 1831 and constructed a log house and a mill on nearby Yocum Creek. Yocum had previously lived in southern Missouri, where he claimed to have found a silver mine and minted his own silver dollars - known as Yocum dollars. Yocum established the Yocum Milling company, which was in operation until destroyed by a fire in the 1920s. The Yocum post office existed from 1882 until 1907.
