= Long Creek (White River tributary) =

Stream in Arkansas

Location
- Country: United States
- State: Arkansas
- Counties: Boone and Carroll

Physical characteristics
- Source
  - coordinates: 36°12′12″N 93°17′00″W
  - elevation: 2,090 ft (640 m)
- Mouth
  - coordinates: 36°27′33″N 93°17′59″W
  - elevation: 915 ft (279 m)

Long Creek is a stream in western Boone and eastern Carroll counties of Northwest Arkansas. The stream is a tributary of the Table Rock Lake section of White River.

The stream headwaters arise high in the Ozark Mountains of northwestern Arkansas in southwest Boone County. The stream flows northwest into Carroll County and turns north and runs parallel to U.S. Route 412 past Carrollton. It turns northeast and re-enters Boone County and passes under the Route 412/Route 62 concurrency just east of Alpena. The stream meanders back and forth across the Boone-Carroll county line repeatedly passing the community of Denver where it gains the Dry Creek tributary. It continues on to the north to enter the waters of Table Rock Lake in northwestern Boone County.

Prior to the construction of Table Rock Dam and filling of the lake, Long Creek entered the southwest corner of Taney County, Missouri and meandered north-northwest into Stone County where it entered the White River just west of the current dam site at an elevation of approximately 720 feet. The Long Creek Recreation Area on Table Rock Lake lies just south of the Missouri Route 86 bridge over the Long Creek arm of the lake in the southwestern corner of Taney County.
