= Cassini =

Cassini may refer to:

== People ==
- Cassini (surname)
- Oleg Cassini (1913–2006), American fashion designer

Cassini family:

- Giovanni Domenico Cassini (1625–1712), Italian mathematician, astronomer, engineer, and astrologer
- Jacques Cassini (1677–1756), French astronomer, son of Giovanni Domenico Cassini
- César-François Cassini de Thury (1714–1784), French astronomer and cartographer, son of Jacques Cassini
- Jean-Dominique, comte de Cassini (1748–1845), French astronomer, son of César-François Cassini de Thury
- Alexandre Henri Gabriel de Cassini (1781–1832), French botanist and naturalist, son of Jean-Dominique de Cassini

== Planetary science ==
- Cassini's laws on the motion of the Moon
- Cassini Division, a gap in the rings of Saturn
- Cassini–Huygens, the space mission to examine Saturn and its moons, of which the Cassini orbiter was a part
- Cassini (Martian crater)
- Cassini (lunar crater)
- 24101 Cassini, an asteroid
- 24102 Jacquescassini, another asteroid
- Cassini Regio, the dark region of the moon Iapetus

== Other uses ==
- Cassini, South Australia
- Cassini oval, a mathematical curve described by Giovanni Cassini
- Cassini projection, in map making
- Cassini Glacier, in Antarctica
- Cassini periodical cicadas, two species of insect
- French cruiser Cassini, French Navy cruiser

== See also ==
- Casini, a surname
