= Cassini (surname) =

Cassini is a surname. Notable people with the surname include:

- Arthur Cassini (1836–1913), Russian diplomat
- César-François Cassini de Thury (1714–1784), French astronomer and cartographer, son of Jacques, who developed the Cassini projection
- Dominique, comte de Cassini (1748–1845), first Count Cassini, French astronomer and cartographer, son of César-François
- Giovanni Domenico Cassini (1625–1712), also known as Jean-Dominique Cassini, Italian-French astronomer
- Henri Cassini (1781–1832), known as Henri Cassini, French botanist, youngest son of Jean-Dominique
- Igor Cassini (1915–2002), American gossip columnist, writing as "Cholly Knickerbocker"
- Jacques Cassini (1677–1756), French astronomer, son of Giovanni Domenico
- Oleg Cassini (1913–2006), American fashion designer
