= Arrien =

- Commune
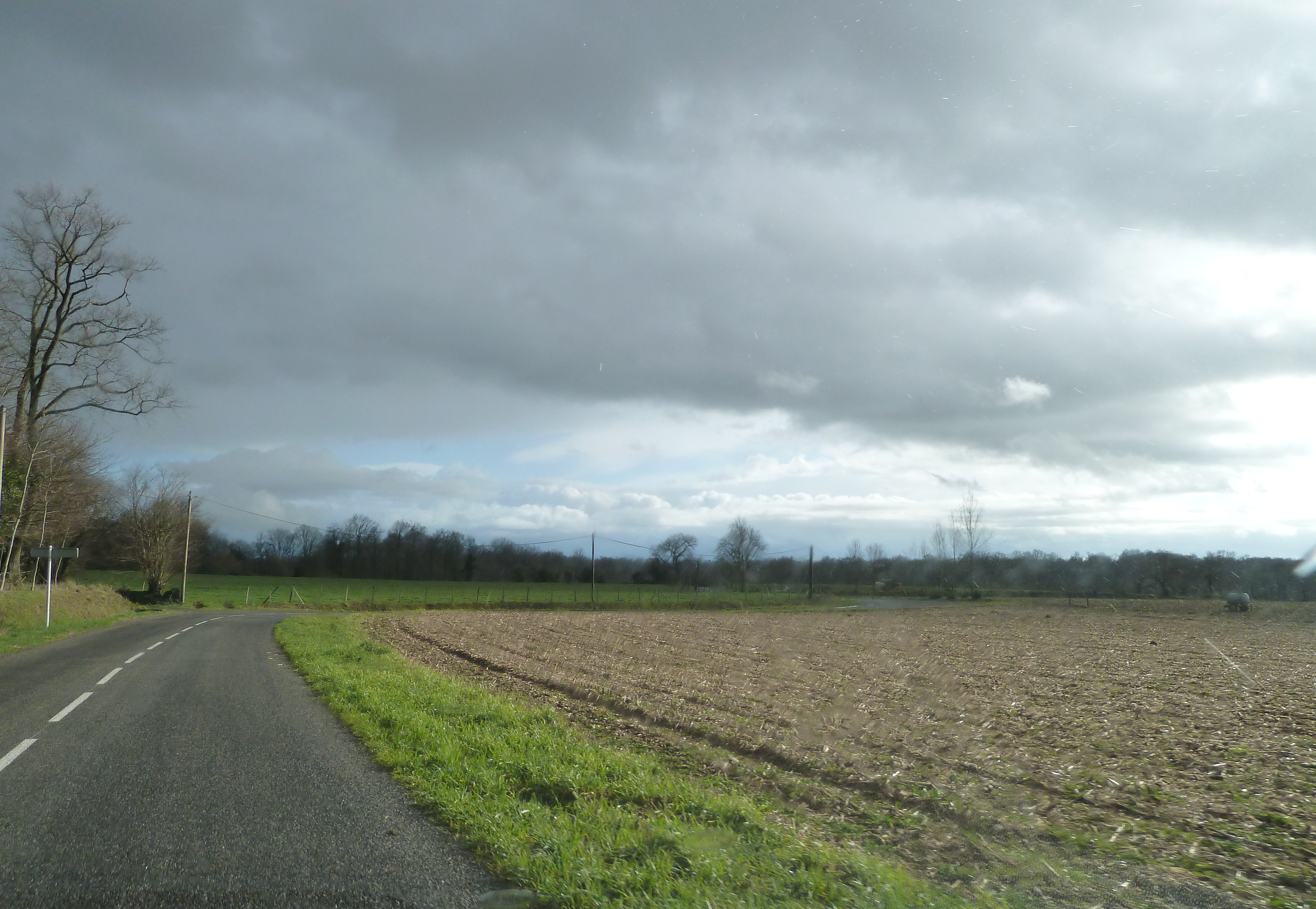
- Countryside at Arrien
- Location of Arrien
- Location within France Location within Nouvelle-Aquitaine
- Coordinates: 43°18′41″N 0°09′15″W
- Country: France
- Region: Nouvelle-Aquitaine
- Department: Pyrénées-Atlantiques
- Arrondissement: Pau
- Canton: Pays de Morlaàs et du Montanérès
- Intercommunality: CC Nord-Est Béarn

Government
  - Mayor (2020–2026): Jean Canton
- Area^{1}: 4.46 km^{2} (1.72 sq mi)
- Elevation: 374 m (1,227 ft)
- Highest elevation: 389 m (1,276 ft)
- Lowest elevation: 312 m (1,024 ft)
- Population (2023): 197
  - Density: 44.2/km^{2} (114/sq mi)
- Time zone: UTC+01:00 (CET)
  - Summer (DST): UTC+02:00 (CEST)
- INSEE/Postal code: 64053 /64420
- ^{1} French Land Register data, which excludes lakes, ponds, glaciers > 1 km^{2} (0.386 sq mi or 247 acres) and river estuaries.

Arrien (French pronunciation: [aʁjɛ̃]; Occitan: Arrien) is a commune in the Pyrénées-Atlantiques department in the Nouvelle-Aquitaine region of south-western France.

== Geography ==
Arrien is located some 18 km east by north-east of Pau and 5 km west of Séron. Access to the commune is by road D42 from Sedzère in the north passing through the heart of the commune east of the village and continuing south to Eslourenties-Daban. The D145 also comes from Baleix in the north and joins the D42 in the commune then continues south-west to Lourenties. Access to the village (Town Hall) is by the Chemin de l'Eglise going west from the D42 and by other local roads. Apart from some patches of forest on the western border the commune is entirely farmland.

The Canne stream forms the southern border of the commune joining the Gabas at the south-western corner which in turn forms most of the western border of the commune flowing north-west then north eventually joining the Adour near Toulouzette. The Poundets stream forms the eastern border of the commune and flows north to join the Petit Lees near Lombia.

=== Places and Hamlets ===
- Canton
- Cazaux
- Claria
- La Croix d'Arrien
- Fontaine Saint-Jean
- Peret
- La Picharotte
- Poulot
- Pouygarou
- Sarthou

== Toponymy ==
Its name in béarnais is Arrien.

Michel Grosclaude indicated that the origin of the name is obscure and mentioned the possibility of the name of a former owner Ariee.

The following table details the origins of the commune name.

| Name | Spelling | Date | Source | Page | Origin | Description |
|---|---|---|---|---|---|---|
| Arrien | Arien | 1385 | Raymond | 12 | Census | Village |
| | Rien | 1536 | Raymond | 12 | Eslourenties | |
| | Saint-Jean d'Arien | 18th century | Raymond | 12 | Empire | |
| | Arrien | 1750 | Cassini | | | |
| | Arricu | 1793 | Ldh/EHESS/Cassini | | | |

Sources:

- Raymond: Topographic Dictionary of the Department of Basses-Pyrenees, 1863, on the page numbers indicated in the table. (in French)
- Cassini: Cassini Map from 1750
- Ldh/EHESS/Cassini: Des villages de Cassini aux communes d'aujourd'hui: Commune data sheet Arrien, EHESS (in French).

Origins:

- Census: Census of Béarn
- Eslourenties: Census of Eslourenties
- Empire: Archives of the Empire, K 779, No. 12 (in French)

== History ==
Paul Raymond noted that the commune had a Lay Abbey, vassal of the Viscounts of Béarn. In 1385 Arrien had 5 fires and depended on the bailiwick of Pau. The church depended on the Abbey of Saint-Sigismund at Orthez.

The Saint-Jean fountain is known for its healing powers of varicose ulcers and eye diseases and has attracted many pilgrims since the 12th century.

The commune was part of the Archdeaconry of Vic-Bilh, which depended on the Bishop of Lescar. Lembeye was the chief town.

== Administration ==
List of Successive Mayors

| From | To | Name |
|---|---|---|
| 1923 | 1929 | Dominique Pédedieu |
| 1929 | 1944 | Joseph Canton |
| 1944 | 1946 | Joseph Lahon |
| 1947 | 1959 | Joseph Canton |
| 1959 | 1983 | Pierre Canton |
| 1983 | 1995 | André Cazalis |
| 1995 | 2001 | Jean Canton |
| 2001 | 2005 | Jean Louis Cazalis |
| 2005 | 2008 | Bernard Joan |
| 2008 | 2020 | Martine Loustau |
| 2020 | 2026 | Jean Canton |

=== Inter-communality ===
The commune is part of four inter-communal structures:

- the Communauté de communes du Nord-Est Béarn;
- the AEP association of Luy and Gabas;
- the Energy association of Pyrénées-Atlantiques;
- the inter-communal association for the construction of the Soumoulou rescue centre;

== Demography ==
Historical population

| Year | Pop. | ±% p.a. |
|---|---|---|
| 1793 | 209 | — |
| 1821 | 231 | +0.36% |
| 1846 | 269 | +0.61% |
| 1872 | 250 | −0.28% |
| 1901 | 189 | −0.96% |
| 1926 | 180 | −0.19% |
| 1946 | 135 | −1.43% |
| 1962 | 132 | −0.14% |
| 1968 | 125 | −0.90% |

| Year | Pop. | ±% p.a. |
|---|---|---|
| 1975 | 112 | −1.56% |
| 1982 | 120 | +0.99% |
| 1990 | 138 | +1.76% |
| 1999 | 135 | −0.24% |
| 2007 | 121 | −1.36% |
| 2012 | 160 | +5.75% |
| 2017 | 185 | +2.95% |
| 2023 | 197 | +1.05% |

Source: EHESS and INSEE

== Culture and Heritage ==
=== Civil Heritage ===
There are two registrations of historical monuments for Arrien:

- Houses and Farms
- The former Chateau of Arrien (19th century).. The original chateau was sold in 1730 and converted to a presbytery. The building was sold by the commune in 1975. It is shown on the Cassini Map as a "chateau".

=== Religious Heritage ===
The Parish Church of Saint John the Baptist (19th century) is registered as an historical monument. The church contains several items that are registered as historical objects:

- The Furniture in the Church
- A Sunburst Monstrance (19th century)
- A Processional Cross (17th century)
- A Processional banner (19th century)

Church Picture Gallery

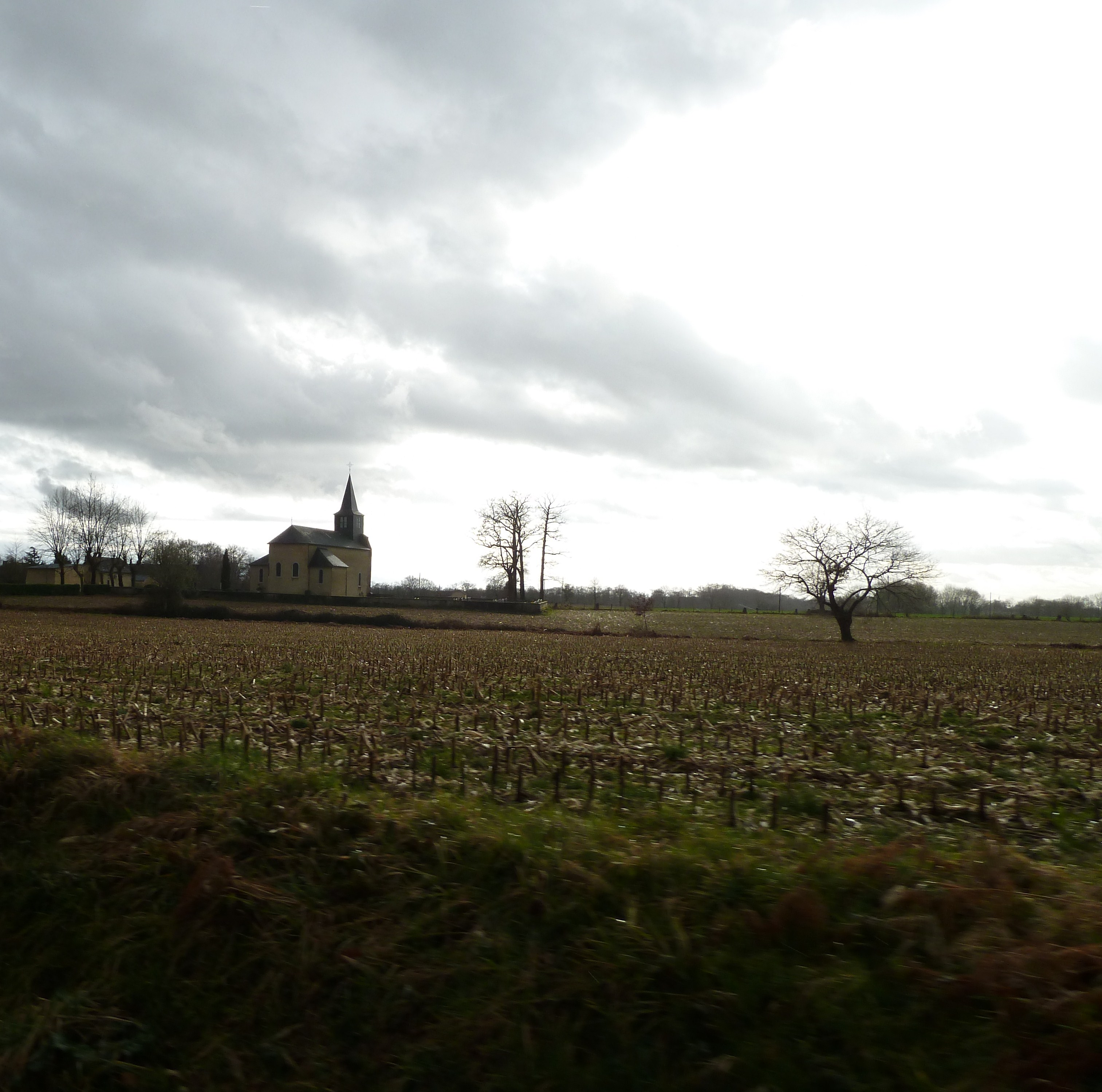
The Church over the fields

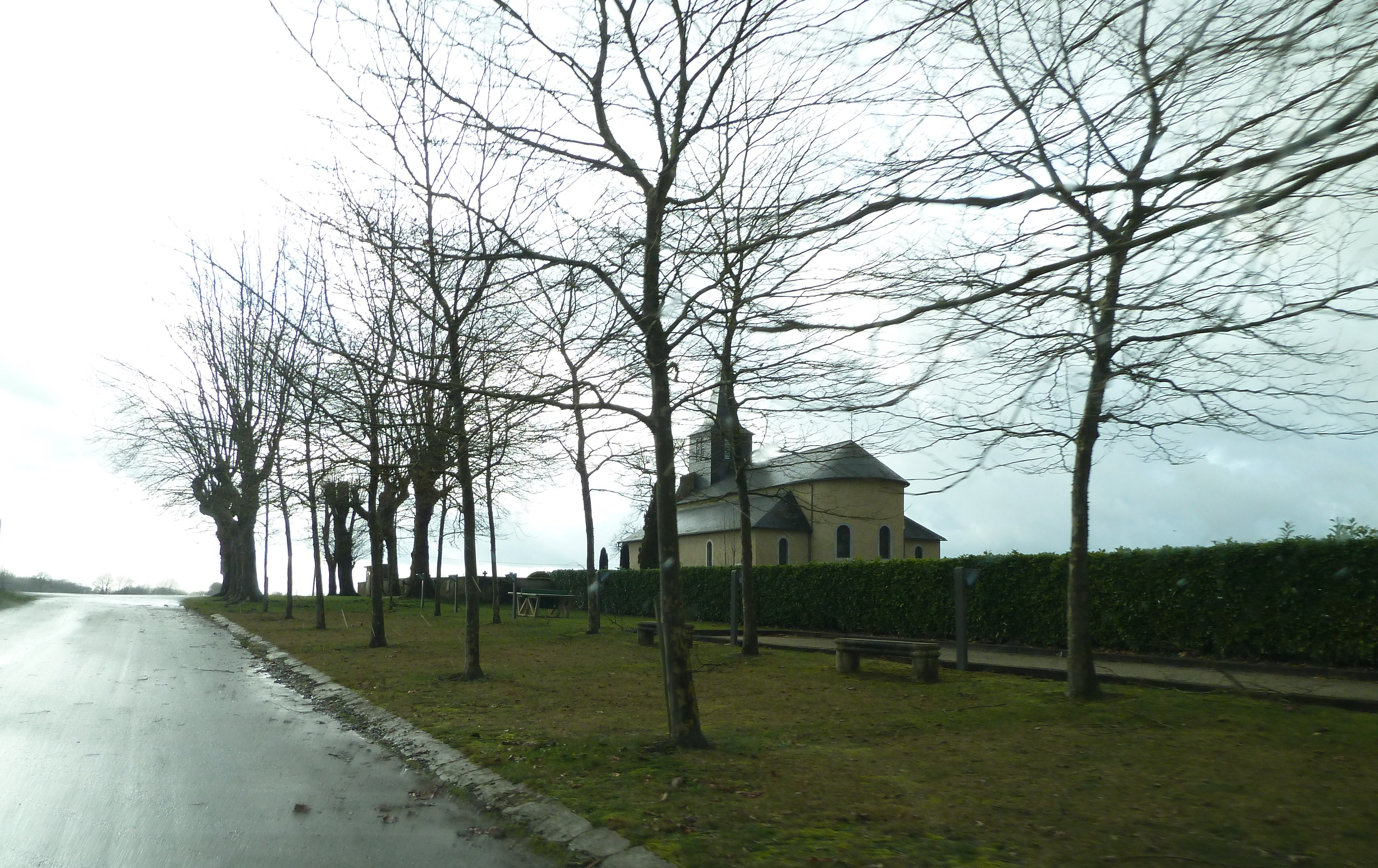
The Church from the road

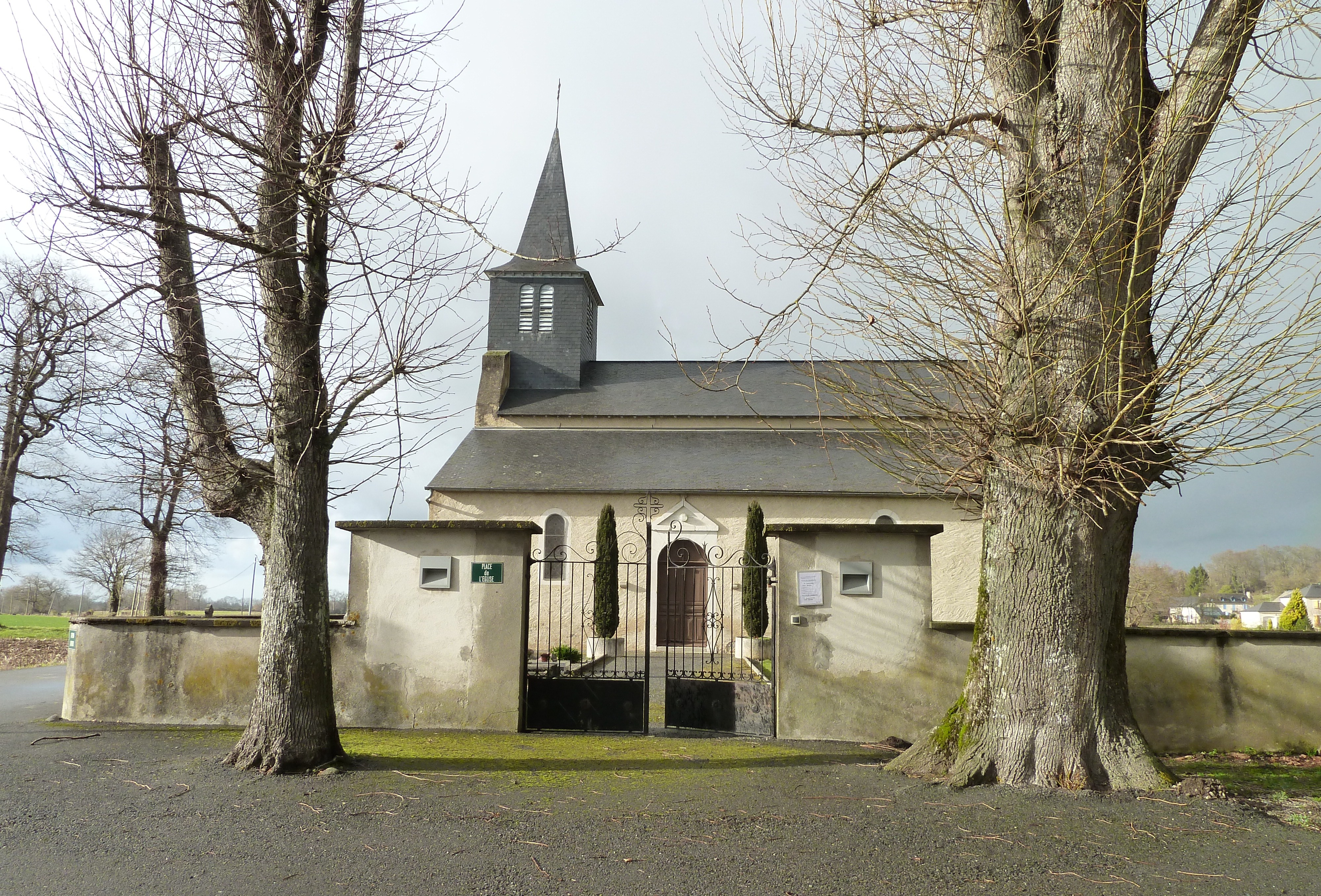
The church through the trees

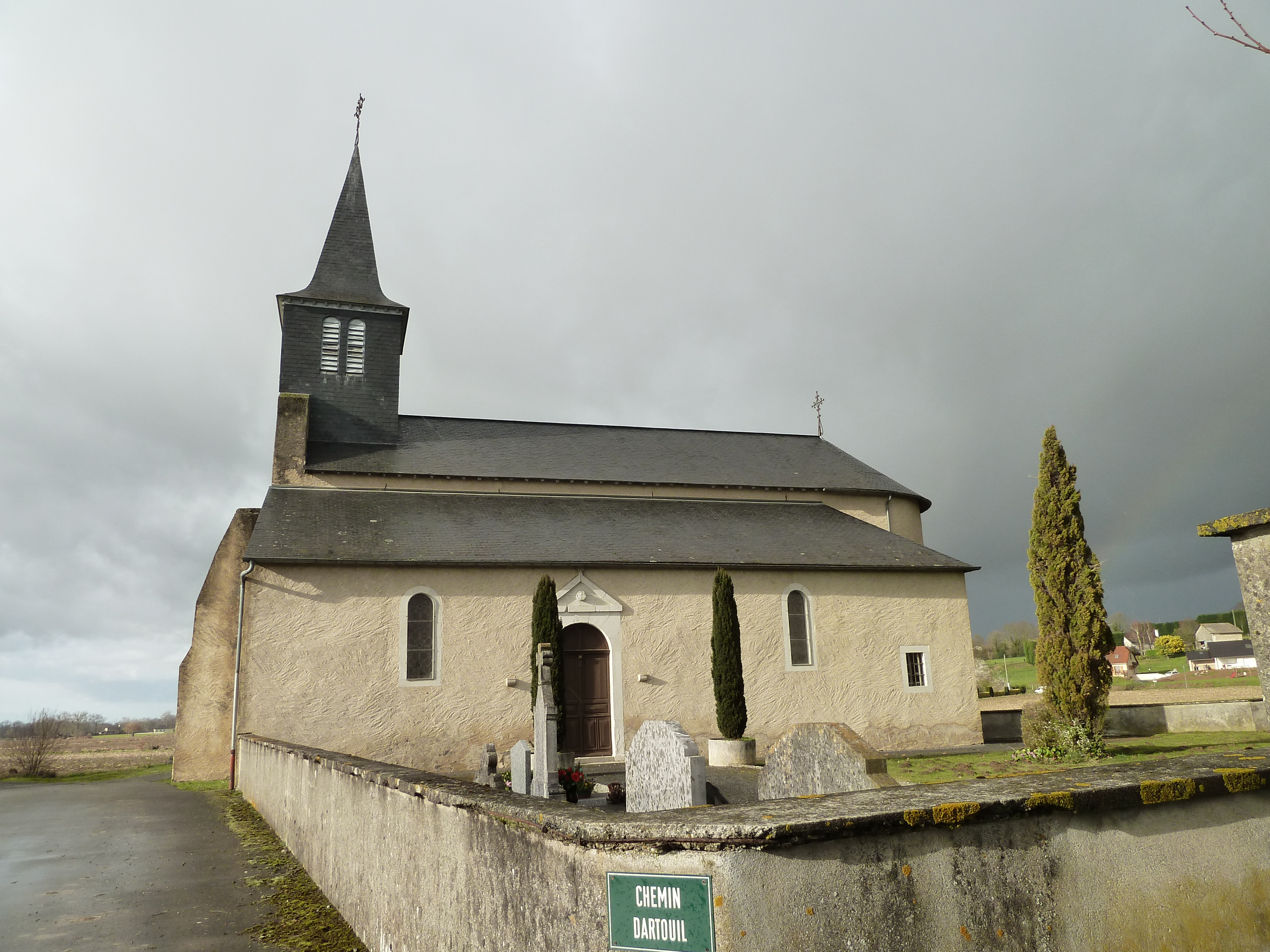
The church

== See also ==
- Communes of the Pyrénées-Atlantiques department
