= Jean-Dominique Cassini =

Jean-Dominique Cassini can refer to:

- Giovanni Domenico Cassini (1625–1712), known in France as Jean-Dominique Cassini
- Dominique, comte de Cassini (1748–1845), great-grandson of Giovanni Domenico Cassini (also known as Cassini IV)
