= Casini =

Casini is an Italian surname. Notable people with the surname include:

- Angela Casini, medicinal and inorganic chemist
- Barbara Casini (born 1954), Italian vocalist and guitar player
- Carlo Casini (1935–2020), Italian politician
- Giovanni Casini (1689–1748), Italian portraitist
- Giovanni Maria Casini (1652–1719), Italian composer
- Giuseppina Casini, known as Pina Cei (1904–2000), Italian stage, film and television actress
- Italo Casini (1892–date of death unknown), Italian bobsledder
- Maria Teresa Casini (1864–1937), Italian nun, founder of the Oblate Sisters of the Sacred Heart of Jesus
- Pier Ferdinando Casini (born 1955), Italian politician
- Riccardo Casini (born 1992), Italian footballer
- Stefania Casini (born 1948), Italian actress
- Valore and Domenico Casini, two brothers, both Italian painters

== See also ==
- Cassini (disambiguation)
