= Fibonacci's identity =

Fibonacci's identity may refer either to:

- the Brahmagupta–Fibonacci identity in algebra, showing that the set of all sums of two squares is closed under multiplication
- the Cassini and Catalan identities on Fibonacci numbers
