= Cassina =

Cassina may refer to:

== Places in Italy ==
- Cassina de' Pecchi, in the province of Milan
- Cassina Rizzardi, in the province of Como
- Cassina Valsassina, in the province of Lecco
- Cassina Amata, in the province of Milan
- Cassina Nuova, in the province of Milan
- Cassina, ancient name of Cascina, in the province of Pisa

== People with the surname ==
- Igor Cassina, Italian gymnast

== Other uses ==
- Ilex cassine (dahoon holly)
- Ilex vomitoria (yaupon holly)
- The black drink brewed by Native Americans of the Southeastern United States from the leaves of the yaupon holly
- Cassina S.p.A., manufacturer of design furniture in Milan

== See also ==
- Cassini (disambiguation)
