= Cassini map =

18th century map of France made by the Cassini family

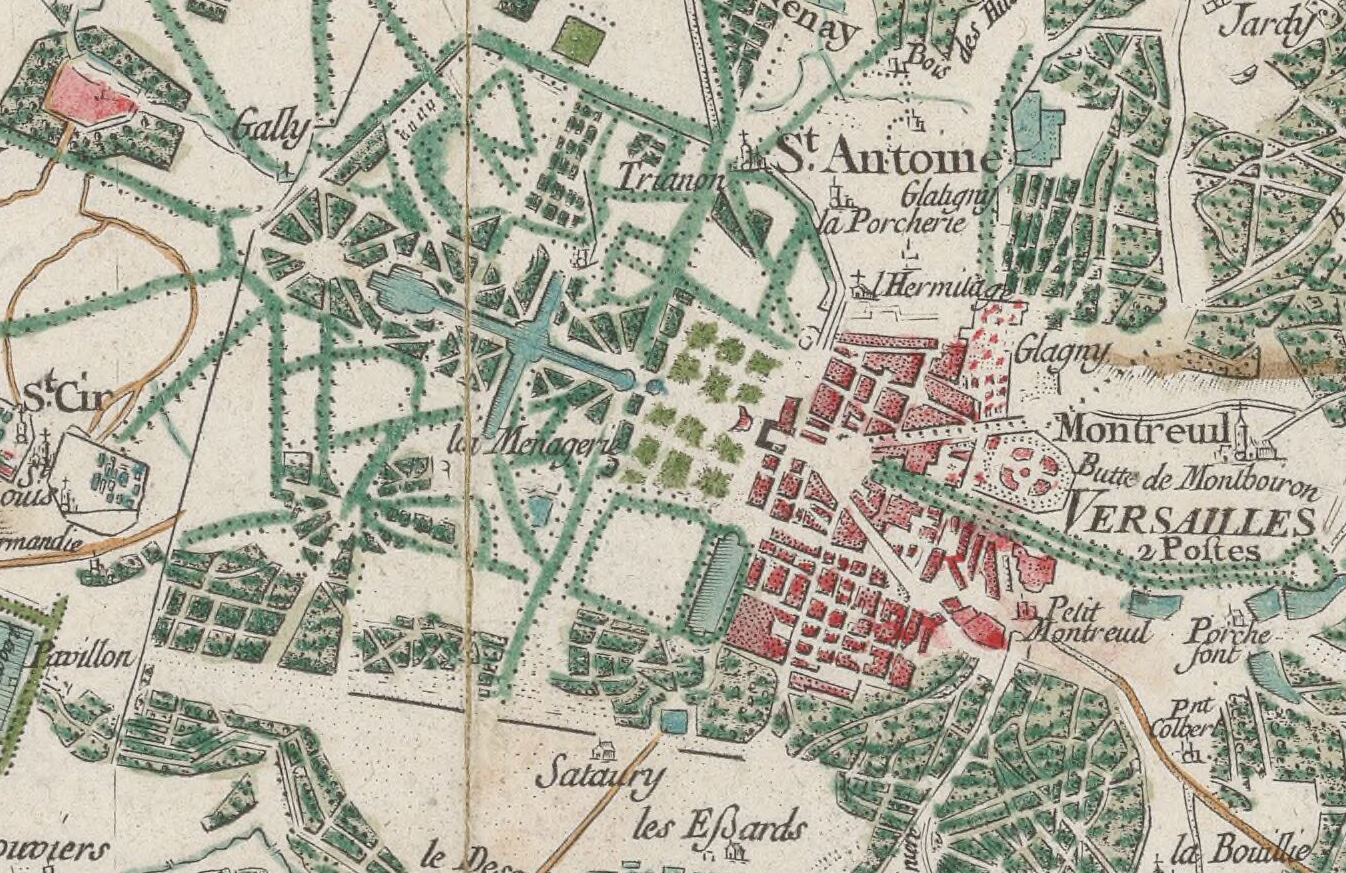
Versailles on the Cassini map

The Cassini Map or Academy's Map is the first topographic and geometric map made of the Kingdom of France as a whole. It was compiled by the Cassini family, mainly César-François Cassini (Cassini III) and his son Jean-Dominique Cassini (Cassini IV) in the 1700s.

It was on a scale of one line to 100 toises, i.e. 1/86,400.

The map was, for the time, a real innovation and a decisive technical advance. It is the first map to be based on a geodesic triangulation. Four generations of the Cassini carried out the work, taking more than six decades to complete. The map does not precisely locate dwellings or the boundaries of swamps and forests, but the level of precision of the road network represented is such that by superimposing satellite photos onto map sheets of France, spectacular results are obtained.

The work of the Cassinis even left its mark on the land where today you can still find toponyms such as "Signal of Cassini." Such landmarks correspond to the corners of the triangles that formed the backbone of Cassini's map.

Nowadays, researchers frequently consult the Cassini map sheets, in its paper form in the reading room of the maps and plans department of the Bibliothèque nationale de France, or its digital form online. It is of particular interest to archaeologists, architects, historians, geographers, genealogists, treasure hunters and ecologists who need to retrospect ecology or understand the history of landscape.

== Beginnings ==
The genesis of the Cassini Map came during the reign of Louis XIV, with the creation of the Academy of Sciences alongside the ambitions of Jean-Baptiste Colbert for France's navy, the defence of her coasts and fixing the imprecision of the country's maps. At the time, distances between settlements to be portrayed on maps were often estimated by the time of the journey between them or by measuring the length of the road. Sometimes, triangulation was used - though often relying on the magnetic pin of a compass without concern for one's latitude. This would result in confounded errors when compiling these maps into one.

Cassini, alongside other scientists like Picard, Roëmer and Richer, investigated movement of the planets relative to Earth. Cassini noted such methods were riddled with instrumental errors and were susceptible to parallax. Picard and La Hire write in 1672 that King Louis XIV instructed the Academy of Sciences to "create a map of all of France with the greatest precision possible." Cassini writes that in September 1672, M. Vivier had "come by order of the King" and was "employed by order of the King to work on the Map of the Kingdom under the direction of the Academy of Sciences."

== Gallery ==
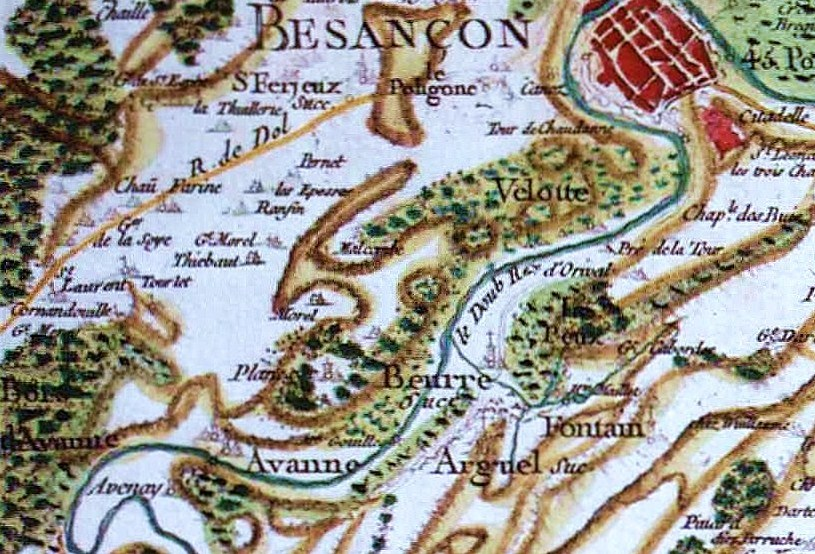

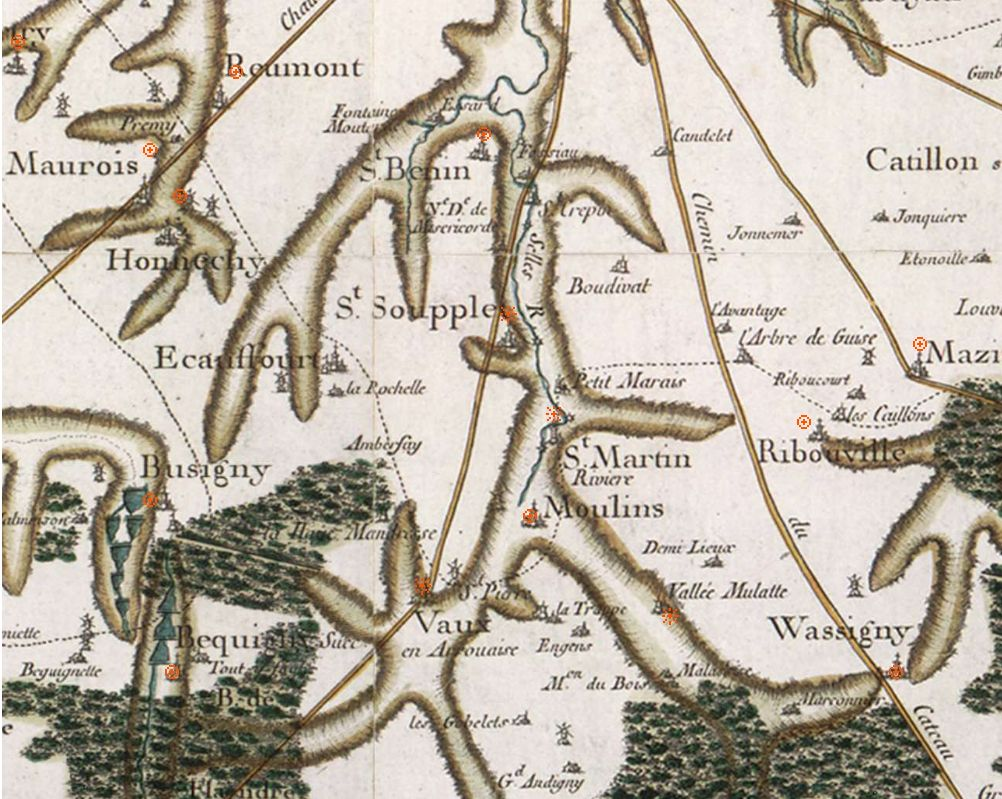

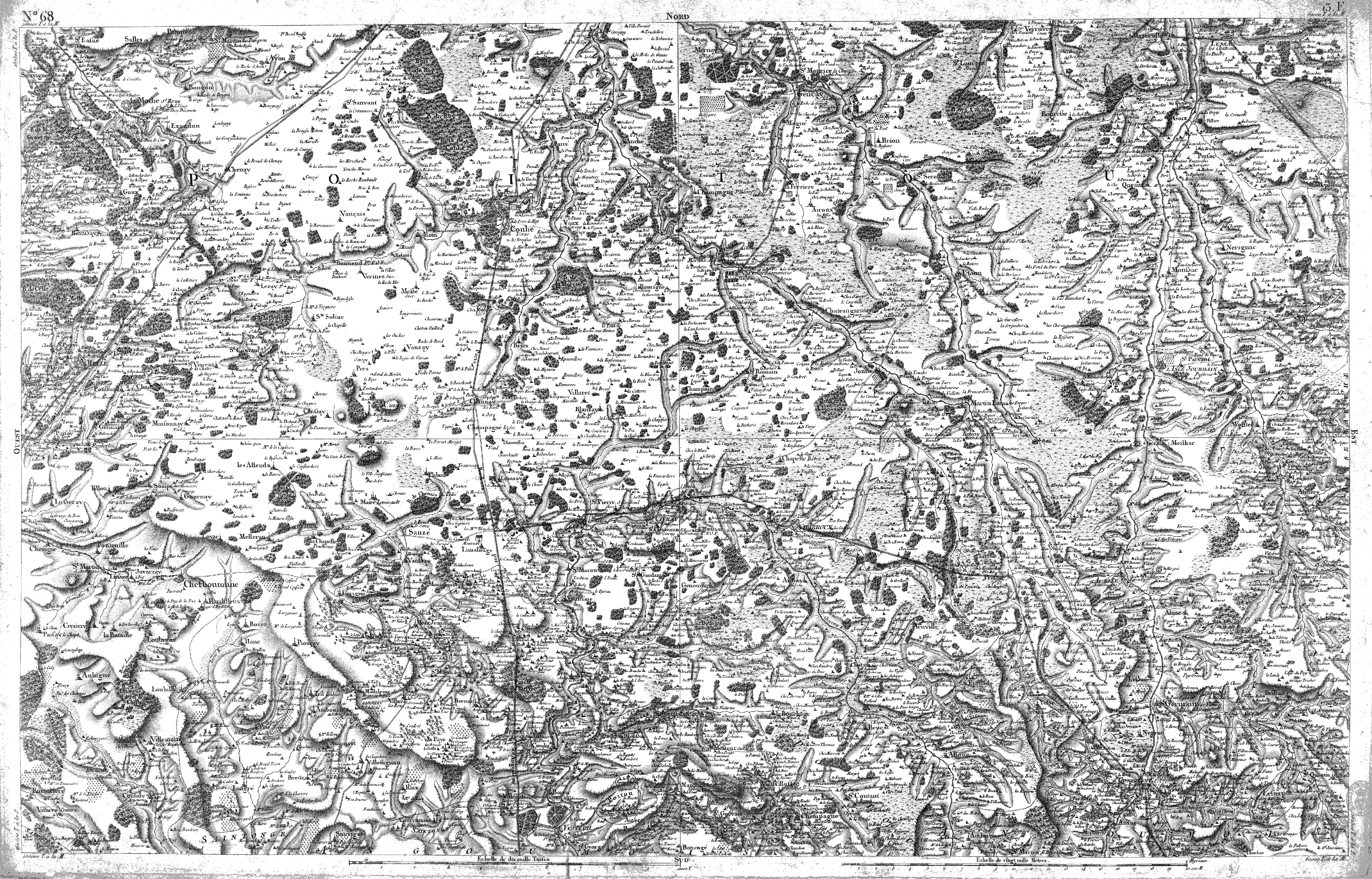

== See also ==
- French cartography

== External ==
- Online portal (in French) – gives access to an interactive copy of the full Cassini map
