= Cartography of France =

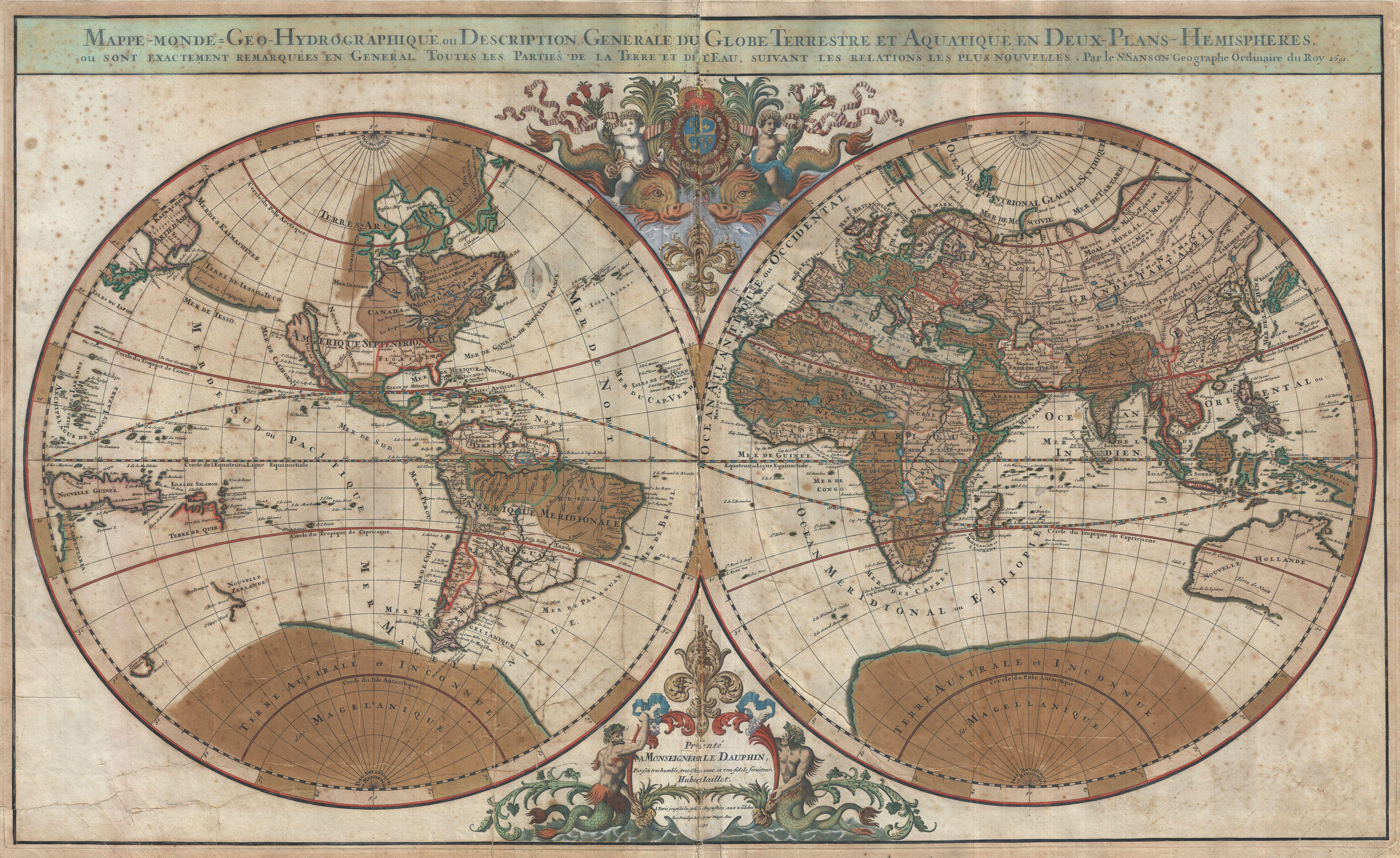
The French Sanson family was a major contributor to cartographic maps from the 17th century onwards. Pictured above: Sanson and Jaillot's decorative map of the world on a double hemisphere projection from 1691

The history of French cartography can be traced to developments in the Middle Ages. This period was marked by improvements in measuring instruments and also by an upgrade of work in registers of all types. What is thought to be the oldest land map in Europe, the Saint-Bélec slab, representing an area of the Odet valley, was found in 1900, and rediscovered in a castle cellar in France in 2014. The Bronze-Age stone is thought to be 4,000 years old.

The first map of France was drawn by Oronce Finé and printed in woodcuts in 1525. It testifies to the will of the political power to mark its presence on the territory; to affirm, to build limits, borders, to arrange its territory, and to consolidate the internal economic markets. In the 16th century, Dieppe appeared as an important school of cartography. Pierre Desceliers allowed the realization of many maps. At the same time, the Portolan maps of the Portuguese sailors had the most recent knowledge obtained by the Dieppois sailors in their exploration of Canada.

Developments in cartography continually progressed, through new techniques and by the expanding will of political powers to amass and control territories. Very powerful companies testify support to some of the cartographic missions at the end of the 19th century. Two major milestones in cartographic study was successfully determining longitude and latitude.

== Cassini maps ==
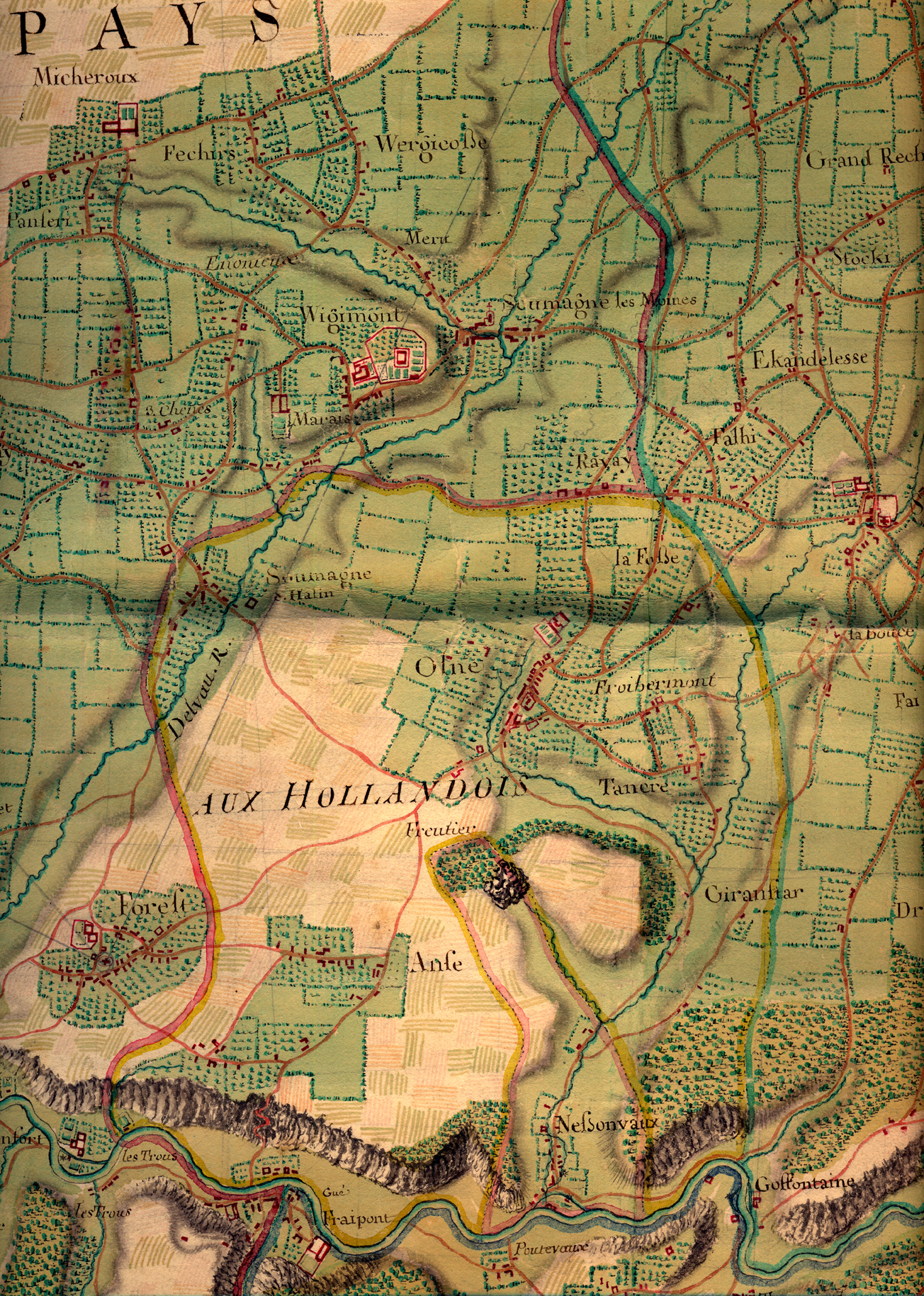
Hand-drawn map of one side of the Valley of Vesdre by French geographers (led by the Cassini family) from 1745 to 1748

In France, the first general maps of the territory using a measuring apparatus were made by the Cassini family during the 18th century on a scale of 1:86,400 (one centimeter on the chart corresponds to approximately 864 meters on the ground). The map of Cassini is the first geometrical map covering the entire kingdom of France. Before the surveys, it was necessary to carry out a triangulation of the territory.

These maps were, for their time, a technical innovation. They were the first maps based on geodetic triangulation, and took more than fifty years to complete; four generations of the Cassini family were involved in their production. These maps, known as "Cassini Maps" or "maps of the Academy," are still referenced by geographers, historians and genealogists.

The work of the Cassinis left its mark on the world; toponyms known as "Cassini signs" still exist, revealing where triangulated measurements at that time were made. The "map of Cassini" or "map of the Academy" is the first general map of the kingdom of France. It was drawn up by the Cassini family—primarily César-François Cassini de Thury (Cassini III) and his son Jean-Dominique Cassini (Cassini IV)—during the 18th century. The adopted scale is one ligne to 100 toises, or 1:86,400 (the measuring apparatus contained 864 lines).

The map does not pinpoint dwellings or the boundaries of marshes and forests; however, the level of precision of the road networks is such that satellite photographs correspond almost completely with drawn roads more than 200 years later. This map is still consulted today by researchers. It interests historians, in particular those in the fields of geography, genealogy and ecology.

=== Purpose ===
César-François Cassini (Cassini III) began the map:

- To measure distances by triangulation, ensuring the exact positioning of locations
- To measure the kingdom, determining the number of boroughs, cities and villages
- To depict unchanging landscape features

=== Survey maps ===
The surveys were carried out between 1756 and 1789 and the 181 sheets composing the map were published from 1756 to 1815. César-François Cassini died in 1784 with his work unfinished. His son, Jean-Dominique Cassini (1748–1845), later finished the work of his father.

The departments of Savoy, Haute-Savoie and part of the Maritime Alps were not part of the Kingdom of France at the time, and are not represented on the map; neither are the Île d'Yeu and Corsica. Most of the map sheets were published as a new edition in 1815.

== Replacement by Napoleon ==
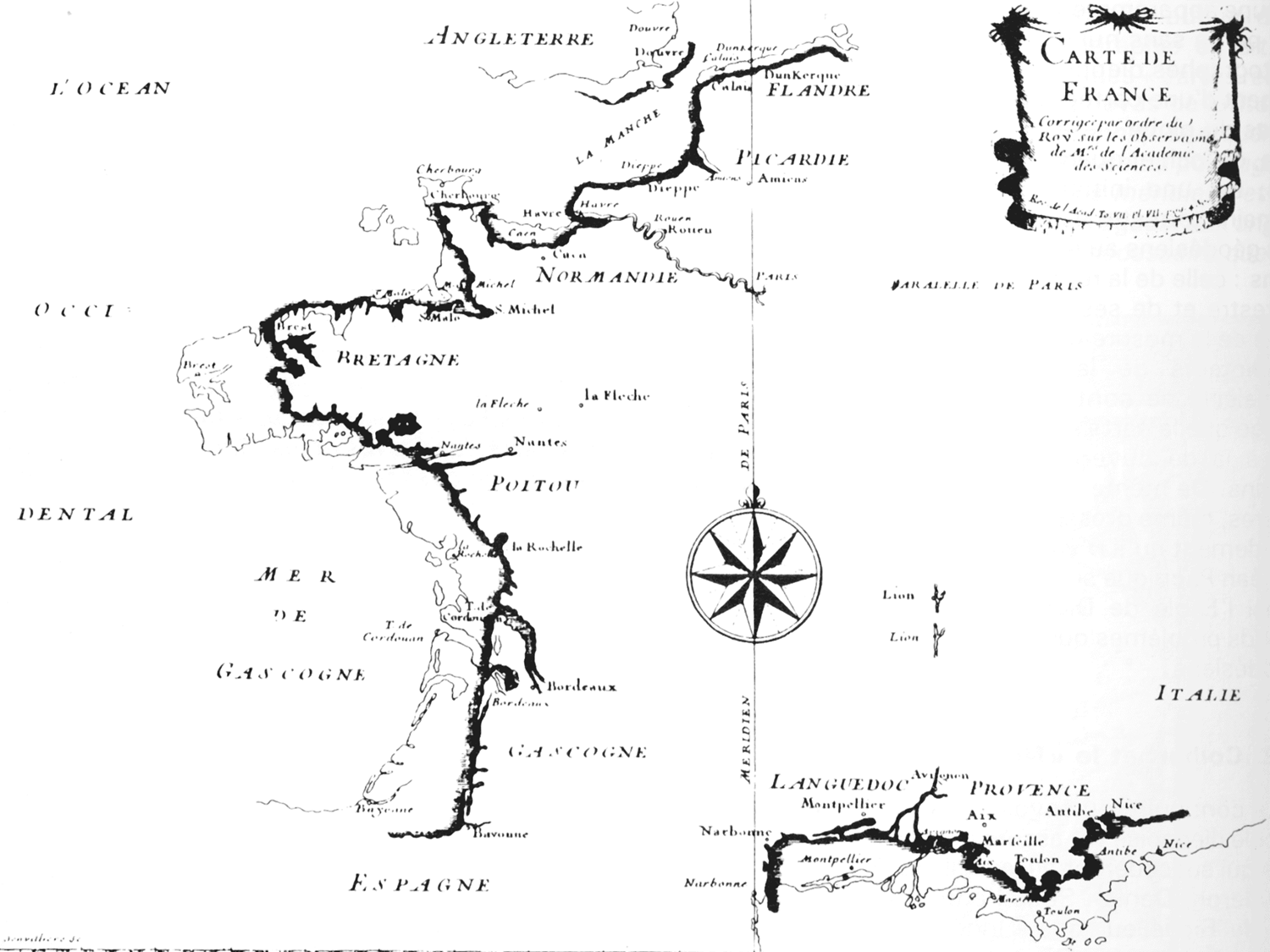
Map of the French coast, corrected by the Academy of Science

In 1808, Napoleon decided to produce a map intended to be more accurate than that of Cassini. However, Napoleon demanded that the primary goal of the work was to produce battlefield maps.

The triangulation for this new map began also from the Paris meridian arc or French meridian line (French: Méridienne de France) surveyed this time by Delambre and Méchain (the meridian arc of Delambre and Méchain). Work on this map took place between 1817 and 1866. During this period several different scales were tested, with the scale 1:80,000 being chosen. This became known as the "Geological Survey" map. The funding for this work was provided by the Department of War. The first work was done by the Dépôt de la guerre, and later by the Geographical Service of the Army, whose first director General François Perrier and his successor General Bassot remeasured the French meridian arc.

It was originally produced as a mosaic of maps, pasted to fabric, folded and protected by a hard case. This allowed it to be transported with the army, and to survive the rigors of ground combat.

At the beginning of the First World War (1914–1918), the difficulties of reading a map on this scale led the generals to request new map drawn to the 1:50 000 scale. This was more convenient, and practical, since one metre on the map equaled 50 kilometres. These new maps formed the basis for the current "Map of Excursion", which is at a scale of 1:25,000.

== IGN ==
The Institut géographique national (English: National Geographic Institute) or IGN is a French public state administrative establishment founded in 1940[1] to produce and maintain geographical information for France and its overseas departments and territories.

“Intense cartographic work planned for the beginning of the war was stopped by the defeat of France in June 1940. Shortly afterward the great map service known to the world as the Service Géographique de l’Armée Française was demilitarized and renamed Institut National Géographique. Under this label, which it still bears, it continued to function, its activities including the opening of a new school for cartographers in the famous building of the Hôtel de Rohan in Paris. A few more sheets of the 1:50,000 map of France were published. The main progress was achieved by the African Army Map Service, which was able to pursue field work, particularly in the Sahara. The list of maps of French Africa have lengthened notably."

== See also ==
- Cartographers
- French geodesic mission
- Géoportail
- Institut Géographique National
- Topography
- Map projection
- Naval Hydrographic and Oceanographic Service
- Nicolas Sanson
- Paris meridian
- Pictorial maps
