= Panzano Observatory =

17th-century Italian space observatory

- Location: Panzano, Castelfranco Emilia, Province of Modena, Emilia-Romagna, Italy
- Coordinates: 44°37′16″N 11°02′30″E
- Location of Panzano Observatory

The Panzano Observatory was an observatory in the village of Panzano about 3 kilometres (1.9 miles) to the NNW of the centre of the comune of Castelfranco Emilia, near Bologna, Italy, where Giovanni Cassini worked. It was built in the early 1640s by Cornelio Malvasia.

== See also ==
- List of astronomical observatories
