= Cornelio Malvasia =

Italian aristocrat and military leader

- Marquis of Bismantova
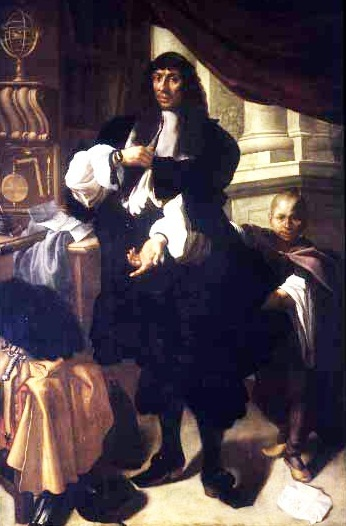
- Cornelio Malvasia
- Tenure: 1644–1664
- Other names: Arteniso Tebano
- Born: April 11, 1603; Bologna, Papal States
- Died: 29 March 1664 (aged 60); Bologna, Papal States
- Buried: Bologna Cathedral
- Spouse: Ortensia Ercolani (m. 1628)
- Father: Ercole Malvasia
- Mother: Lucrezia Atti
- Occupation: aristocrat, patron of astronomy and military leader

Cornelio Malvasia, Marquis of Bismantova (11 April 1603 – 29 March 1664) was an Italian aristocrat, patron of astronomy and military leader.

== Early life ==
Malvasia was born in 1603 to an aristocratic family of Bologna and was the cousin of Carlo Cesare Malvasia.

== Military career ==
During the Wars of Castro he led papal army cavalry against the Dukes of Parma. He became close to the nephews of Pope Urban VIII and his later correspondence and publications carried the Barberini crest; three bees. His cousin Carlo later received assistance, in Rome, from Barberini loyalist, Cardinal Marzio Ginetti.

Despite the Duchy of Modena having sided with the Dukes of Parma during the Wars of Castro, Malvasia later became a military advisor to Alfonso IV d'Este, Duke of Modena. He was later named Marechal of the French army in Italy while Francesco II d'Este (later Duke of Modena after his father) was General of that army.

In 1656 he visited Paris and received honours from King Louis XIV - a 400 doppie annual pension for his position of Marechal and a gift of a diamond bottoniera from Cardinal Mazarin.

== Patron of astronomy ==
Throughout his military career, Malvasia maintained a strong general interest in astronomy, optics and scientific engineering. He is credited with having contributed to the invention of the reticle or "cross-hairs" during the 1620s; final credit is usually ascribed to Robert Hooke.

Malvasia was elected a Senator of Bologna and began construction of the privately owned Panzano Observatory in the early 1640s.

In 1645 Malvasia invited Giovanni Domenico Cassini to Bologna and offered him a position in his observatory, which was close to completion. Most of their time was spent calculating newer, better, and more accurate ephemerides for astrological purposes using the rapidly advancing astronomical methods and tools of the day. 17 years later, in 1662, their collaborative work, Ephemerides novissimae motuum coelestium, was published by Malvasia. It was dedicated to Cardinal Giulio Cesare Sacchetti - twice nominated by Antonio Barberini as the French candidate for pope - and included a rather laudatory dedication in which Malvasia claimed he could trace Sacchetti's ancestry back to Ancient Roman gods.

Malvasia corresponded with a number of other contemporary astronomers during his development of new methods.

== Works ==
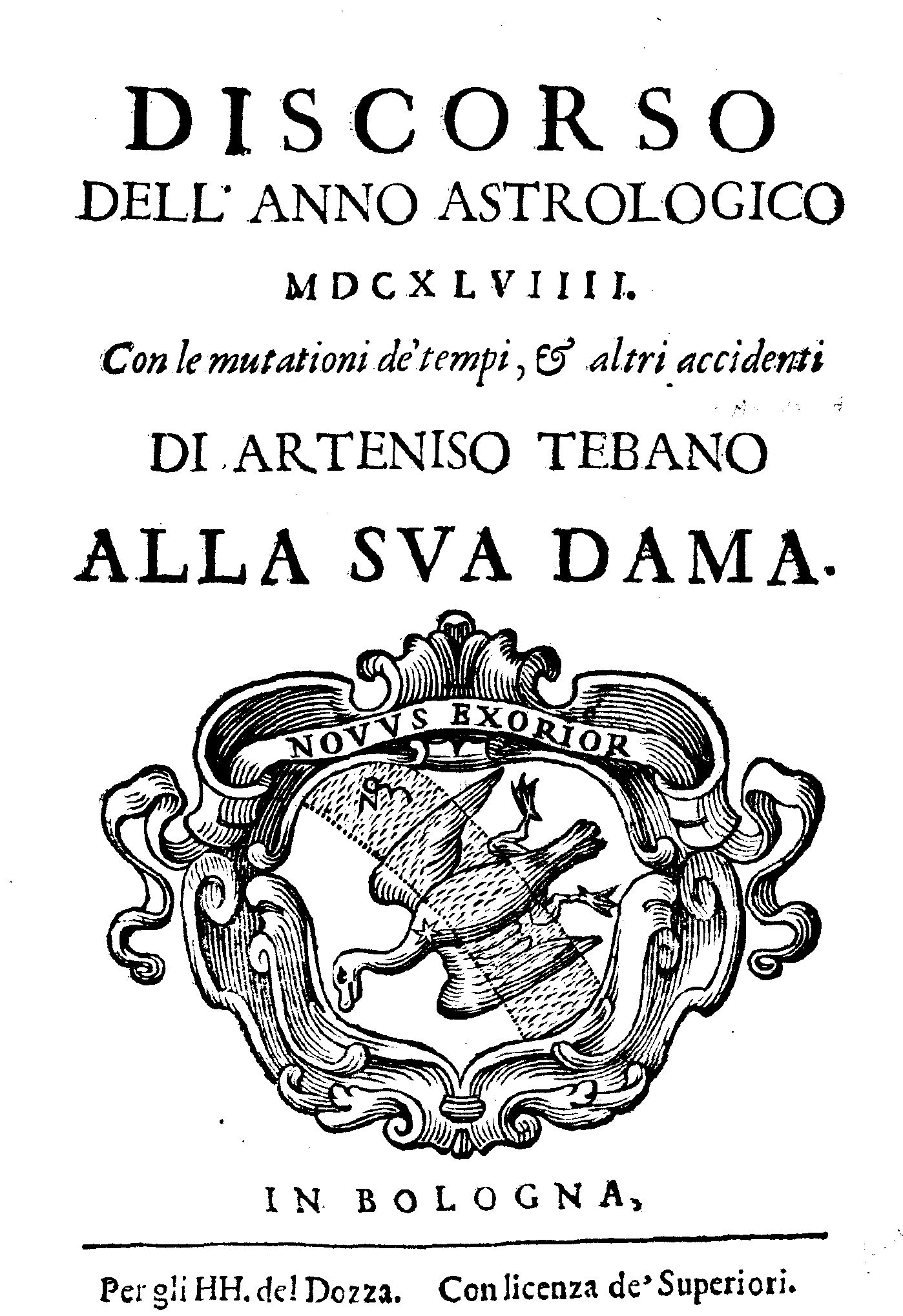
Discorso dell'anno astrologico 1649, 1649

- Luca Gaurico (1638). Astrologia quam vocant iudiciariam in aphorismos resoluta (in Latin). Translated by Cornelio Malvasia. Frankfurt am Main: Johann Theobald Schönwetter.
- Discorso dell'anno astrologico 1647 (in Italian). Bologna: eredi di Evangelista Dozza. 1647.
- Discorso dell'anno astrologico 1649 (in Italian). Bologna: eredi di Evangelista Dozza. 1649.
- Discorso dell'anno astrologico 1650 (in Italian). Bologna: Giacomo Monti. 1650.
