= Jacques Cassini =

French astronomer (1677–1756)

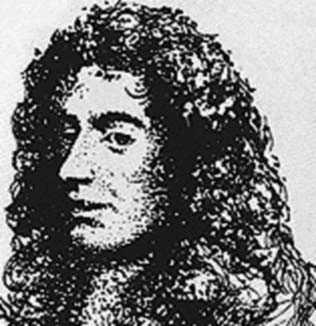
- Born: 18 February 1677; Paris Observatory, France
- Died: 16 April 1756 (aged 79); Thury, France
- Children: César-François Cassini de Thury
- Scientific career
- Fields: Astronomy, cartography

Jacques Cassini (18 February 1677 – 16 April 1756) was a French astronomer, son of the famous Italian astronomer Giovanni Domenico Cassini. He was known as Cassini II.

== Biography ==
Cassini was born at the Paris Observatory. He was first admitted to Collège Mazarin after brief studies at his home observatory under his father. Later, he was admitted at the age of seventeen to membership of the French Academy of Sciences, he was elected in 1696 a fellow of the Royal Society of London, and became maître des comptes in 1706. While in England, he was acquainted with other famous astronomers such as Isaac Newton and Edmond Halley.

Having succeeded to his father's position at the observatory in 1712, in 1713 he extended the Paris meridian, measuring the arc of the meridian from Dunkirk to Perpignan, and published the results in a volume entitled Traité de la grandeur et de la figure de la terre (1720). His two separate calculations for a degree of meridian arc were 57,097 toises de Paris (111.282 km) and 57,061 toises (111.211 km), giving results for Earth's radius of 3,271,420 toises (6,375.998 km) and 3,269,297 toises (6,371.860 km), respectively. This work represented Cassini's delve into the Earth figure debate.

There were two main schools of thought, the Cartesians believed in a prolate spheroid, and the Newtonians in an oblate spheroid. Cassini sided with the Cartesians over the Newtonians, advocating for a prolate spheroid shaped earth. The Cartesians had support, but the Newtonians made separate observations seeming to disagree with the Cartesian idea. Cassini II likely realized that the Newtonian observations were more accurate, and stepped out of the scientific field. He only returned publicly after an attack from Anders Celsius.

For his last few years he took up cartography, working with his son, Cassini de Thury or Cassini III, to create a new French map. This map was known as the Carte de Cassini, and was to be a very accurate map of France.

Jacques Cassini's work on the ballistic pendulum has been a topic of controversy among historians of science. While some credit him with developing original work on the topic, others argue that he built upon the ideas of earlier scientists. It is difficult to determine the extent of Cassini's original contributions, as the available historical records are vague and incomplete. However, subsequent work on ballistic pendulums by Benjamin Robins (1707–1751), a British mathematician and engineer, suggests that he independently repeated many of the same results. Regardless of the extent of Cassini's original contributions, his work on the ballistic pendulum was significant in its time and helped to advance the field of ballistics. The device allowed for the measurement of the velocity of projectiles, which was important for the development of more accurate firearms and artillery.

He also wrote Eléments d'astronomie on proper motion (1740), and published the first tables of the satellites of Saturn in 1716. He died at Thury, near Clermont, France.

The lunar crater Cassini, and asteroid 24102 Jacquescassini is named after him.

Jacques Cassini married Suzanne Françoise Charpentier de Charmois. Their second son was astronomer César-François Cassini de Thury, who was also known as Cassini III.

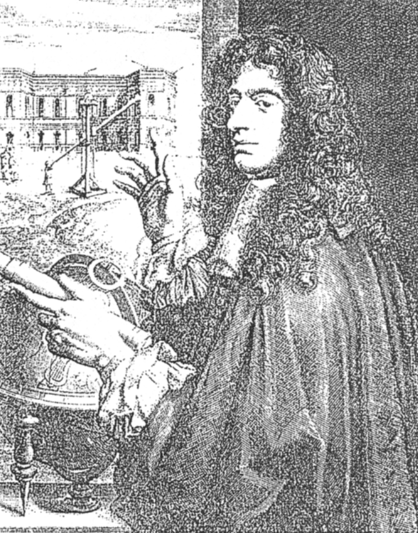
Engraving of Jacques Cassini in his Paris Observatory by L. Coquin

== Works ==
Among his works, there are:

- De la grandeur et de la figure de la terre, 1720 (About the size and features of Earth)
- Méthode de déterminer si la terre est sphérique ou non, 1738 (Method to determine if Earth is a sphere or not)
- Éléments d'astronomie, 1740 (Anstronomy elements)
- Traité de la Comète qui a paru en décembre 1743 & en janvier, février & mars 1744 (About the comet that appeared December 1743, January, February and March 1744)
