= Maria Teresa Casini =

Italian nun (1864–1937)

Blessed Maria Teresa Casini
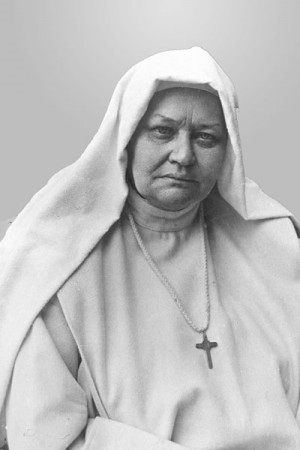

Religious
- Born: 27 October 1864; Frascati, Papal States
- Died: 3 April 1937 (aged 72); Grottaferrata, Rome, Italy
- Venerated in: Roman Catholic Church
- Beatified: 31 October 2015, Frascati, Italy by Cardinal Angelo Amato
- Feast: 3 April
- Attributes: Religious habit
- Patronage: Oblate Sisters of the Sacred Heart of Jesus; Vocations

Maria Teresa Casini (27 October 1864 – 3 April 1937) was an Italian nun and was the founder of the Oblate Sisters of the Sacred Heart of Jesus. The order was devoted to providing care for those around them with an added emphasis on demonstrating the love of Jesus Christ while spreading the message of the Gospel to the public.

She was cleared for beatification in 2015 after a miracle was found to have been attributed to her intercession. She was beatified on 31 October 2015 in Frascati. Cardinal Angelo Amato presided over the celebration on behalf of Pope Francis.

== Biography ==
Maria Teresa Casini was born on 27 October 1864 to Tommaso Casini and Melania Rayner as their first born daughter; she was baptized on the following 29 October.

She travelled to Rome for her studies at the Santa Rufina boarding school that the nuns of the Madams of the Sacred Heart conducted. She received her First Communion on 7 May 1878 which solidified her vocation. Due to a period of ill health, she had to leave school and return home for recuperation.

Shortly after she turned eighteen, she responded to her vocation and met Father Arsenio Pellegrini who became her guide and her spiritual director and who served as the Abbot of the Basilian Monks of Grottaferrata. Despite entering the convent, ill health forced her to leave, though she attempted to enter once again yet failed due to the death of the foundress after which the institute she joined ceased to exist.

In due time, she became a nun after entering the monastery of Sepolte Vive in Rome on 2 February 1885. Casini only started to live in Grottaferrata with fellow entrants from 17 October 1892 onwards. On 2 February 1894, she founded the Oblate Sisters of the Sacred Heart of Jesus.

It was not until 1925 that Casini started the special work of the "Little Friends of Jesus" in order to promote and to cultivate the vocations of prospective priests. The group's special character came to life when Cardinal Francesco Satolli requested Casini and her congregation to take up new and vigorous apostolic work. This group also worked for the sanctification of all priests and so the group opened a boarding school for males in order to sate the Lord's request for good and wholesome priests. Throughout her life, Casini offered "the oblation of herself, in faithful response to the Love that overflows from the open Heart of the Savior, and which she imparted to so many daughters and priests". This even earned the praise of Pope Pius X in 1904 who wrote: "In order to bring about the reign of Jesus Christ, nothing is more necessary than the sanctity of the clergy. God bless these sisters for their selfless love for these men of God, for through them, through the sacraments, we are fortified and purified for the journey".

Casini grew ill in the final years of her life, and she died in 1937. Her final words were: "I am peaceful. I feel God is near me".

=== Legacy ===
Casini's order continues to flourish on an international level in places such as the United States of America and Argentina.

The first of the males of the Little Friends of Jesus that Casini herself oversaw was ordained as a priest in 1938.

== Beatification ==
The cause of beatification commenced on 26 January 1981 on a diocesan level which concluded its work in 1985; she was given the title Servant of God. It later submitted the Positio – official documentation – to the Congregation for the Causes of Saints. Pope John Paul II declared her to have lived a life of heroic virtue and named her Venerable on 7 July 1997. Pope Francis approved a decree that recognized a miracle attributed to her intercession on 22 January 2015, thus, clearing her for beatification.

Cardinal Angelo Amato presided over the beatification in Frascati on 31 October 2015.
