= Carlo Casini =

Italian politician (1935–2020)

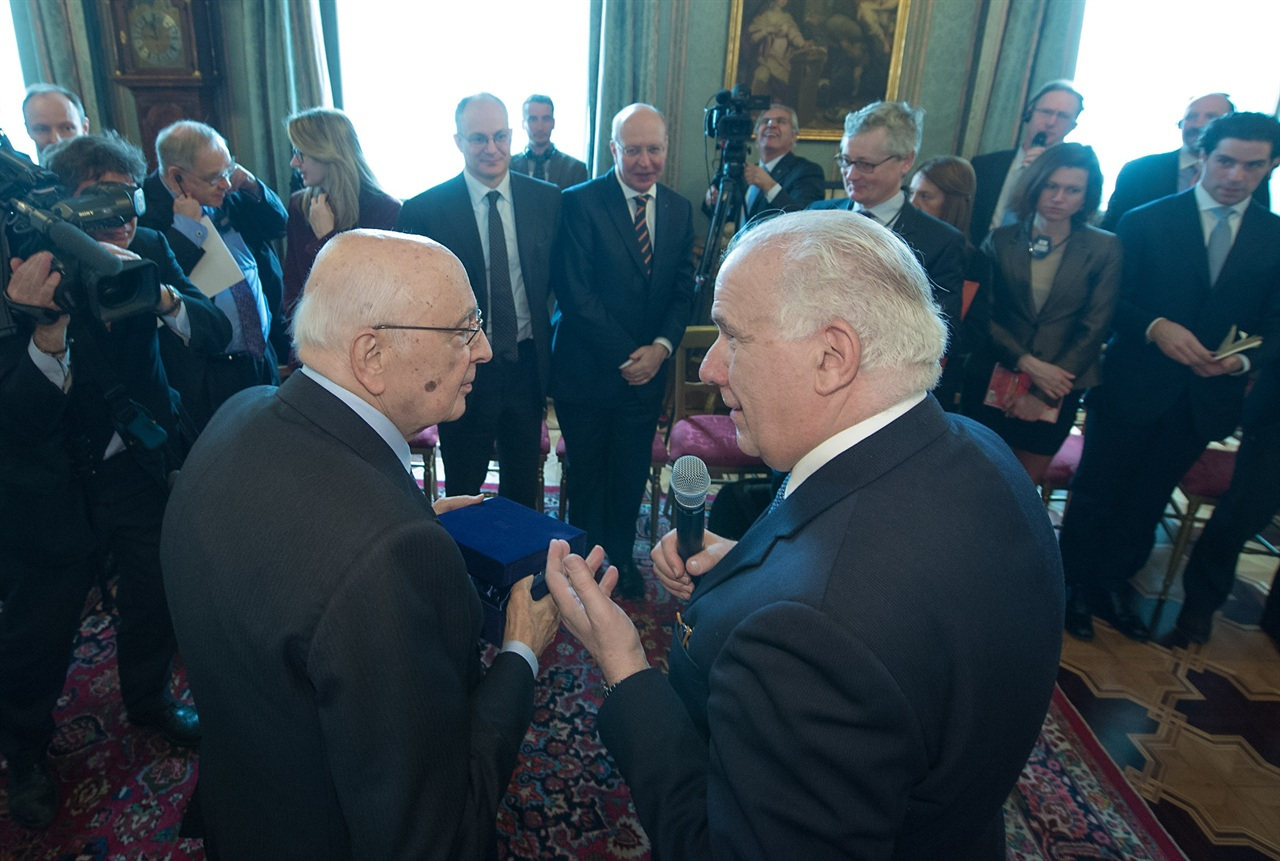
Carlo Casini (right) with former Italian President Giorgio Napolitano (left) in 2014.

Carlo Casini (4 March 1935 – 23 March 2020) was an Italian politician and pro-life advocate. He was a member of the European Parliament (MEP) from 8 May 2006 until 30 June 2014, he served in a vacant seat following the 2006 Italian general election. He represented the Union of Christian and Centre Democrats within the EPP parliamentary group. He was also an MEP from 1984 to 1999.
