= Eslourenties-Daban =

- Commune
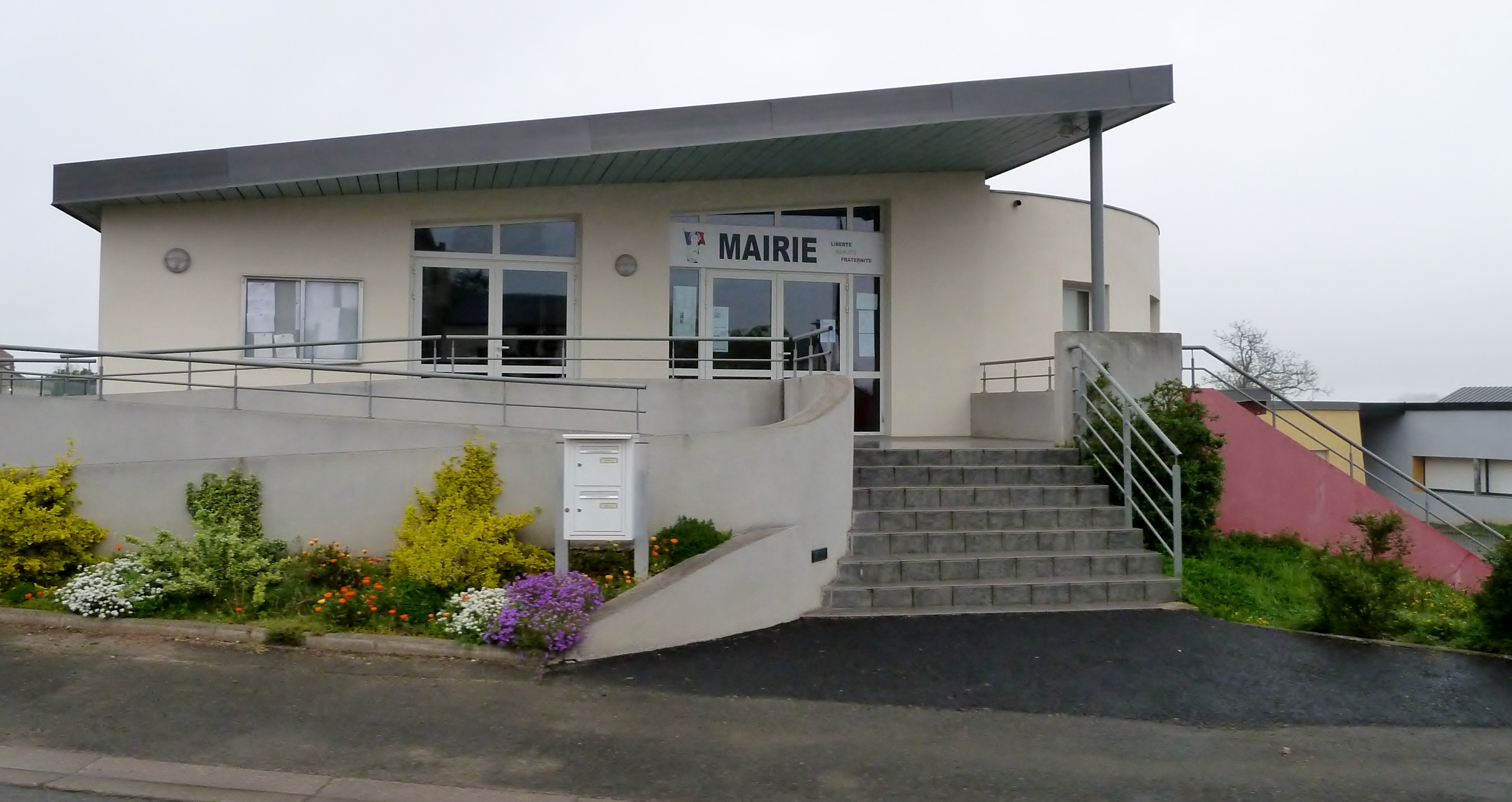
- The town hall of Eslourenties-Daban

- Coat of arms
- Location of Eslourenties-Daban
- Location within France Location within Nouvelle-Aquitaine
- Coordinates: 43°18′01″N 0°08′29″W
- Country: France
- Region: Nouvelle-Aquitaine
- Department: Pyrénées-Atlantiques
- Arrondissement: Pau
- Canton: Pays de Morlaàs et du Montanérès
- Intercommunality: Nord-Est Béarn

Government
  - Mayor (2020–2026): Xavier Boudigue
- Area^{1}: 5.06 km^{2} (1.95 sq mi)
- Elevation: 390 m (1,280 ft)
- Highest elevation: 398 m (1,306 ft)
- Lowest elevation: 329 m (1,079 ft)
- Population (2023): 380
  - Density: 75/km^{2} (190/sq mi)
- Time zone: UTC+01:00 (CET)
  - Summer (DST): UTC+02:00 (CEST)
- INSEE/Postal code: 64211 /64420
- ^{1} French Land Register data, which excludes lakes, ponds, glaciers > 1 km^{2} (0.386 sq mi or 247 acres) and river estuaries.

Eslourenties-Daban (French pronunciation: [ɛsluʁɛ̃tis dabɑ̃]; Occitan: Es·hlorentias) is a commune in the Pyrénées-Atlantiques department and Nouvelle-Aquitaine region of south-western France.

== Geography ==
Eslourenties-Daban is located twenty kilometers east of Pau. The river Gabas, a tributary of the Adour, flows through the commune.

== History ==
Paul Raymond notes that in 1385, Eslourenties-Daban had seven fires and depended on the bailiwick of Pau. This commune was the chief town of the notairie des Lannes and Rivière-Ousse, then during the 18th century of the notairie des Lannes only. The remains of a fortified complex from the 11th century bear witness to the ancient past of the commune.

== Intercommunality ==
Eslourenties-Daban is part of four intermunicipal structures:

- The Community of Municipalities of Nord-Est Béarn;
- The school union of Eslourenties - Lourenties - Limendous;
- The energy syndicate of Pyrénées-Atlantiques;
- The intercommunal drinking water supply syndicate of Luy - Gabas - Lées.

Eslourenties-Daban is home to the headquarters of the Eslourenties-Lourenties-Limendous school union.

== Demographics ==
In 2018, the commune had 353 inhabitants.

== Religious heritage ==
The church of St. Martin dates from the 19th century. It contains furniture, a processional cross, a statue, and canopies, referenced in the general inventory of cultural heritage.

== Environmental heritage ==
The lake of Gabas, a 216ha lake is used for irrigation and is a support of low water level.

The commune also has an environmental pole for fishing intended for environmental education, and a Fishing and Nature House, with a showroom specially equipped for the handicapped. The Handi-fishing pole promotes the practice of leisure fishing for all publics and is specially equipped to welcome disabled people and has received the label Tourisme Handicap.

== See also ==
- Communes of the Pyrénées-Atlantiques department
