= Cassini's laws =

Description of the moon's motion

Cassini's laws provide a compact description of the motion of the Moon. They were established in 1693 by Giovanni Domenico Cassini, a prominent scientist of his time.

Refinements of these laws to include physical librations have been made, and they have been generalized to treat other satellites and planets.

== Cassini's laws ==
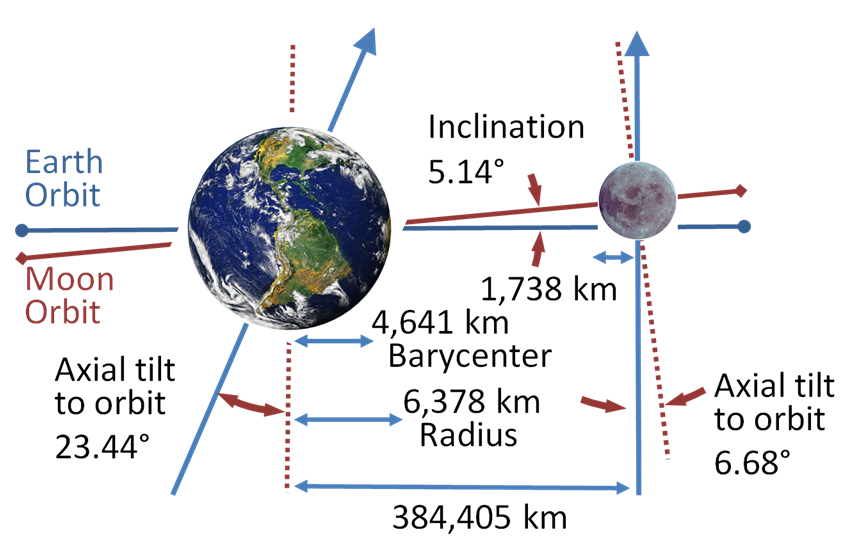
Orbital inclination and rotation. When the Moon is 5.14° north of the ecliptic, its north pole is tilted 6.68° away from the Earth. The orientation of the plane containing the vectors normal to the orbits and the Moon's rotational axis rotates 360° with a period of about 18.6 years, whereas the Earth's axis precesses with a period of around 26,000 years, so the line-up of this illustration (a major lunar standstill) occurs only once every 18.6 years.

1. The Moon has a 1:1 spin–orbit resonance. This means that the rotation–orbit ratio of the Moon is such that the same side of it always faces the Earth.
2. The Moon's rotational axis maintains a constant angle of inclination from the ecliptic plane. The Moon's rotational axis precesses so as to trace out a cone that intersects the ecliptic plane as a circle.
3. A plane formed from a normal to the ecliptic plane and a normal to the Moon's orbital plane will contain the Moon's rotational axis.

In the case of the Moon, its rotational axis always points some 1.5 degrees away from the North ecliptic pole. The normal to the Moon's orbital plane and its rotational axis are always on opposite sides of the normal to the ecliptic.

Therefore, both the normal to the orbital plane and the Moon's rotational axis precess around the ecliptic pole with the same period. The period is about 18.6 years and the motion is retrograde.

== Cassini state ==
A system obeying these laws is said to be in a Cassini state, that is: an evolved rotational state where the spin axis, orbit normal, and normal to the Laplace plane are coplanar while the obliquity remains constant. The Laplace plane is defined as the plane about which a planet or satellite orbit precesses with constant inclination. The normal to the Laplace plane for a moon is between the planet's spin axis and the planet's orbit normal, being closer to the latter if the moon is distant from the planet. If a planet itself is in a Cassini state, the Laplace plane is the invariable plane of the stellar system.

Cassini state 1 is defined as the situation in which both the spin axis and the orbit normal axis are on the same side of the normal to the Laplace plane. Cassini state 2 is defined as the case in which the spin axis and the orbit normal axis are on opposite sides of the normal to the Laplace plane. Earth's Moon is in Cassini state 2.

In general, the spin axis moves in the direction perpendicular to both itself and the orbit normal, due to the tidal force exerted by the object being orbited (planet or star) and other objects in the system. (In the case of the Moon, its spin axis moves mostly under the influence of the Earth, whereas the smaller tidal influence of the Sun works in the same direction at full moon and in the opposite direction at new moon and is thus negligible.) The rate of movement of the spin axis goes to zero if the spin axis coincides with the orbit normal. If the orbit normal precesses in a regular circular motion (due to tidal influences from other objects, such as the Sun in the case of the Moon), it is possible to characterize the solutions to the differential equation for the motion of the spin axis. It turns out that the spin axis traces out loops on the unit sphere that rotates at the speed of the orbital precession (so that the orbit normal and the normal to the Laplace plane are fixed points in the sphere). With certain values of the parameters, there are three areas on the sphere in each of which we have circulation around a point inside the area where the spin axis doesn't move (in this rotating frame of reference). These points are Cassini states 1 and 2 and a third Cassini state in which the rotation is retrograde (which would not apply to a moon like ours that is tidally locked). The three areas are separated by a separatrix that crosses itself, and the point where it crosses itself is the unstable Cassini state 4. (Under other parameter values only states 2 and 3 exist, and there is no separatrix.) If an object flexes and dissipates kinetic energy, then these solutions are not exact and the system will slowly evolve and approach a stable Cassini state. This has happened with the Moon. It has reached a state with a constant obliquity of 6.7°, at which the precession of the spin axis takes the same 18.6 years as taken by the precession of the orbit normal, and is thus in a Cassini state.

== See also ==
- Orbit of the Moon
