= Giovanni Domenico Cassini =

Mathematician and astronomer (1625–1712)

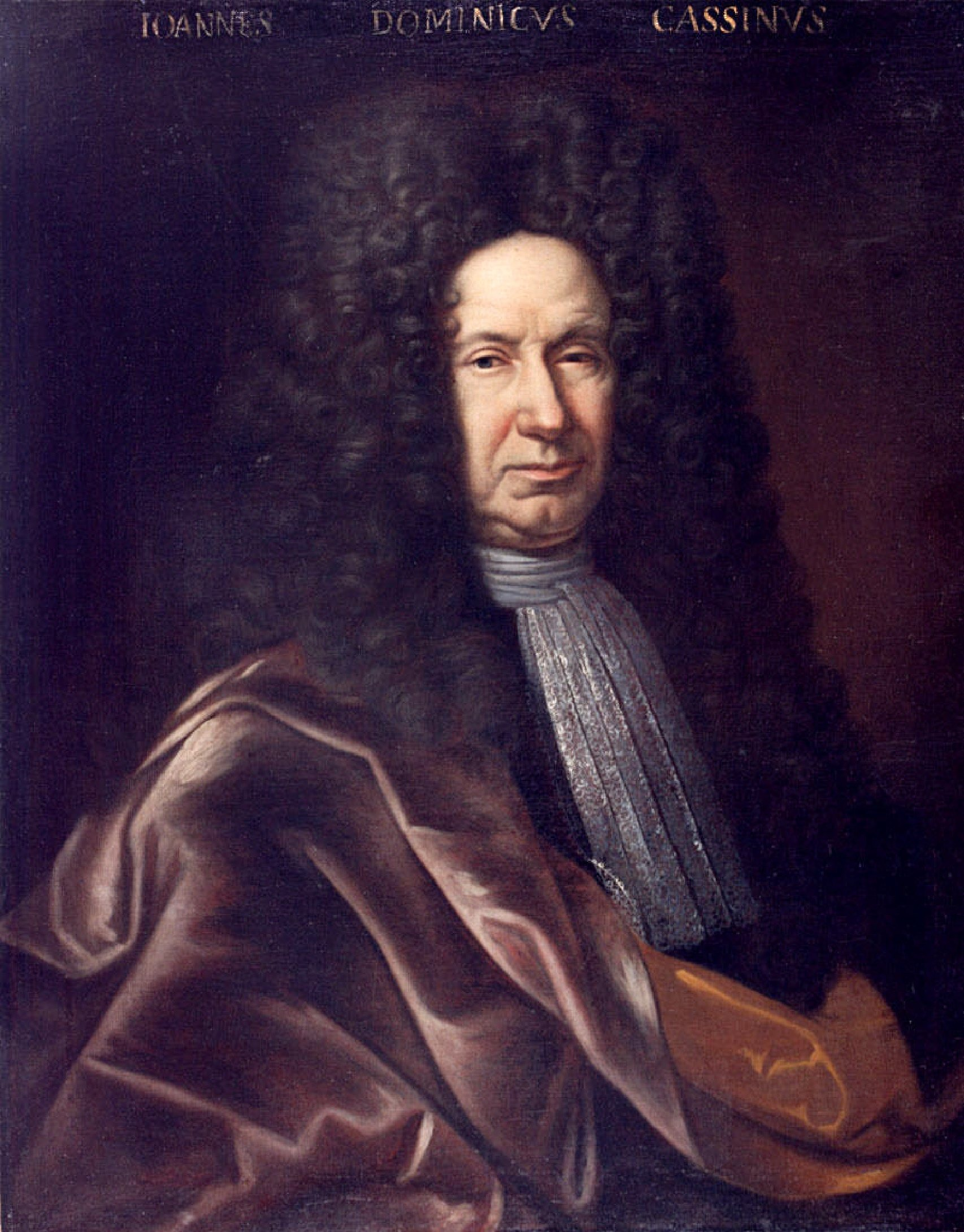
- Portrait of Cassini, 17th century
- Born: 8 June 1625; Perinaldo, County of Nice
- Died: 14 September 1712 (aged 87); Paris, France
- Education: The Jesuit College at Genoa
- Known for: Cassini Division; Cassini identity Cassini's laws Cassini oval First to observe the division in the rings of Saturn
- Children: Jacques Cassini
- Scientific career
- Fields: Mathematics astrology astronomy engineering
- Workplaces: University of Bologna

Signature
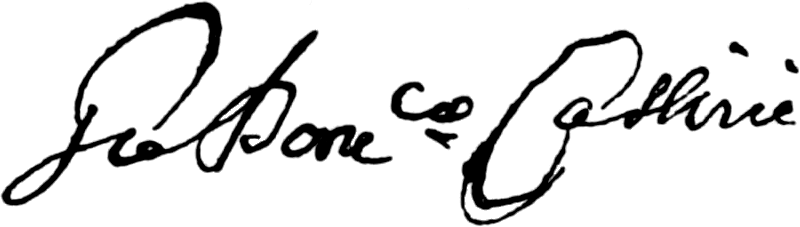

Giovanni Domenico Cassini (Note: His name may also be spelled Giovan Domenico Cassini or Gian Domenico Cassini; also known as Jean-Dominique Cassini.) (8-11 June 1625 – 14 September 1712) was an Italian-French mathematician, astronomer, astrologer and engineer. Cassini was born in Perinaldo, near Imperia, at that time in the County of Nice, part of the Savoyard state. He discovered four satellites of Saturn and noted the division of its rings, later named the Cassini Division. Cassini was also the first of his family to begin work on the project of creating a topographic map of France. In addition, he also created the first scientific map of the Moon.

The Cassini space probe, launched in 1997, was named after him and became the fourth to visit Saturn and the first to orbit it.

== Life ==
=== Time in Italy ===
Cassini was the son of Jacopo Cassini, a Tuscan, and Giulia Crovesi. In 1648 Cassini accepted a position at the observatory at Panzano (Castelfranco Emilia), near Bologna, to work with Marquis Cornelio Malvasia, a rich amateur astronomer, initiating the first part of his career. During his time at the Panzano Observatory, Cassini was able to complete his education under the scientists Giovanni Battista Riccioli and Francesco Maria Grimaldi. In 1650 the senate of Bologna appointed him as the principal chair of astronomy at the University of Bologna.

While in his position in Bologna, he observed and wrote a book on the comet of 1652. He was also employed by the senate of Bologna as a hydraulic engineer, and appointed by Pope Alexander VII inspector of fortifications in 1657. He was subsequently director of waterways in the papal states.

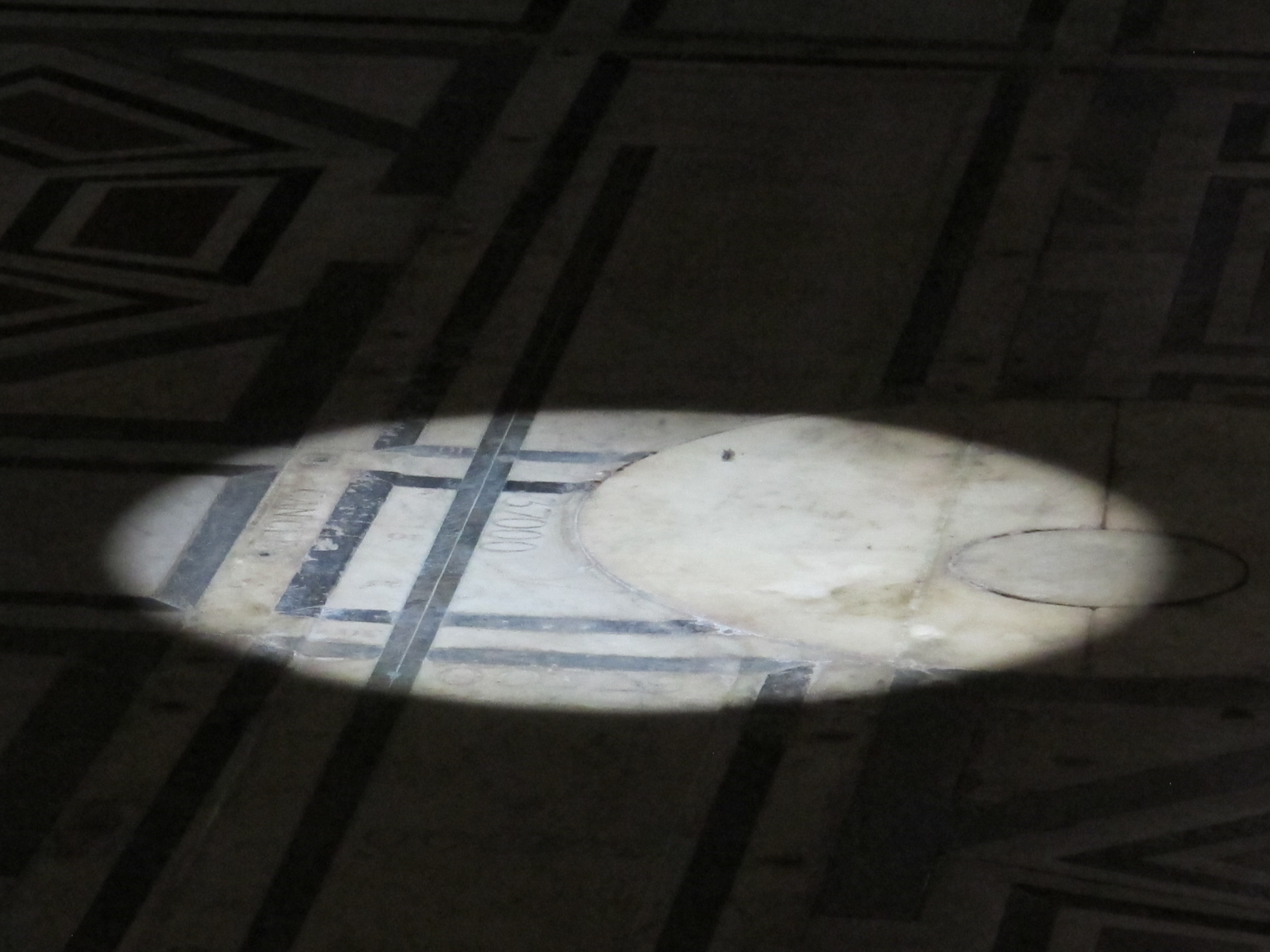
The pinhole-projected image of the Sun on the floor at Florence Cathedral. Cassini measured a similar image over a year at San Petronio Basilica to try to prove the Earth orbited the Sun.

In San Petronio, Bologna, Cassini convinced church officials to create an improved sundial meridian line at the San Petronio Basilica, moving the pinhole gnomon that projected the Sun's image up into the church's vaults 66.8 meters (219 ft) away from the meridian inscribed in the floor. The much larger image of the Sun's disk projected by the camera obscura effect allowed him to measure the change in diameter of the Sun's disk over the year as the Earth moved toward and then away from the Sun. He concluded the changes in size he measured were consistent with Johannes Kepler's 1609 heliocentric theory, where the Earth was moving around the Sun in an elliptical orbit instead of the Ptolemaic system where the Sun orbited the Earth in an eccentric orbit.

Cassini remained in Bologna working until Colbert recruited him to come to Paris to help set up the Paris Observatory. Cassini departed from Bologna on 25 February 1669.

=== Moving to France ===
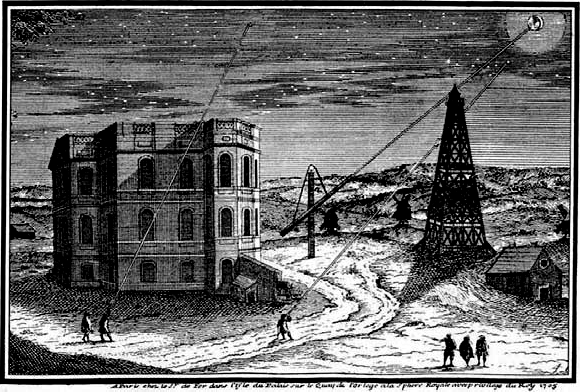
An engraving of the Paris Observatory during Cassini's time. The tower on the right is the "Marly Tower", a dismantled part of the Machine de Marly, moved there by Cassini for mounting long focus and aerial telescopes.

Cassini's determinations of the rotational periods of Jupiter and Mars in 1665–1667 enhanced his fame, and in 1669, with the reluctant assent of the Pope, he moved to France and through a grant from Louis XIV, the "Sun King" of France, helped to set up the Paris Observatory, which opened in 1671; he would remain the director of the observatory for the rest of his career until his death in 1712. For the remaining 41 years of his life Cassini served as astronomer/astrologer to Louis; serving the expected dual role yet focusing the overwhelming majority of his time on astronomy rather than the astrology he had studied so much in his youth. Cassini thoroughly adopted his new country, to the extent that he became interchangeably known as Jean-Dominique Cassini, although that is also the name of his great-grandson, Dominique, comte de Cassini.

During this time, Cassini's method of determining longitude was used to measure the size of France accurately for the first time. The country turned out to be considerably smaller than expected, and the king quipped that Cassini had taken more of his kingdom from him than he had won in all his wars.

On 14 July 1673 Cassini obtained the benefits of French citizenship. In 1674 he married Geneviève de Laistre, the daughter of the lieutenant general of the comté of Clermont. "From this marriage Cassini had two sons; the younger, Jacques Cassini, succeeded him as astronomer and geodesist under the name of Cassini II."

In 1711, Cassini went blind, and he died on 14 September 1712 in Paris at the age of 87.

== Astronomer ==
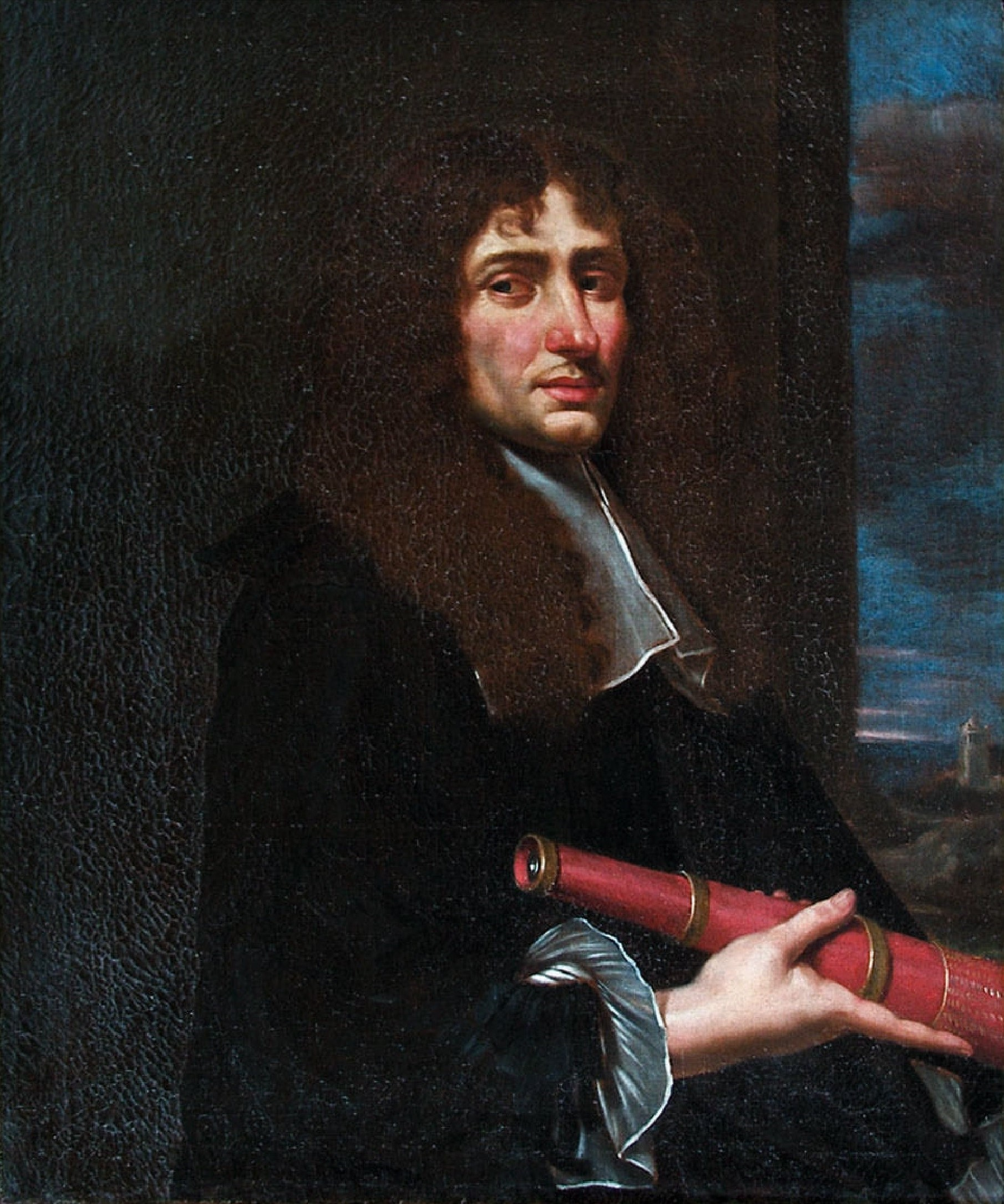
Portrait of Cassini (no later than 1667)

Cassini observed and published surface markings on Mars (earlier seen by Christiaan Huygens but not published), determined the rotation periods of Mars and Jupiter, and discovered four satellites of Saturn: Iapetus and Rhea in 1671 and 1672, and Tethys and Dione (1684). Cassini was the first to observe these four moons, which he called Sidera Lodoicea (the stars of Louis), including Iapetus, whose anomalous variations in brightness he correctly ascribed as being due to the presence of dark material on one hemisphere (now called Cassini Regio in his honour). In addition, he discovered the Cassini Division in the rings of Saturn in 1675. He shares credit with Robert Hooke for the discovery of the Great Red Spot on Jupiter (ca. 1665). Around 1690, Cassini was the first to observe differential rotation within Jupiter's atmosphere.

In 1672, he sent his colleague Jean Richer to Cayenne, French Guiana, while he himself stayed in Paris. The two made simultaneous observations of Mars and, by computing the parallax, determined its distance from Earth. This allowed for the first time an estimation of the dimensions of the Solar System: since the relative ratios of various Sun-planet distances were already known from geometry, only a single absolute interplanetary distance was needed to calculate all of the distances.

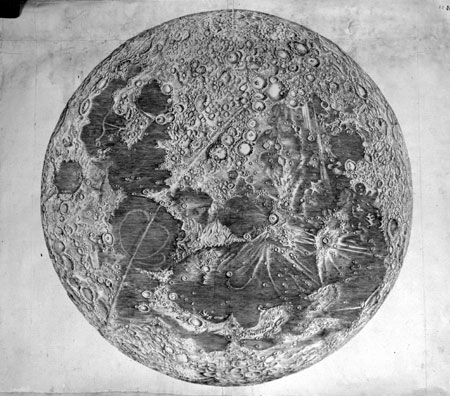
Cassini's map of the Moon

In 1677, the English philosopher John Locke visited Cassini in Paris. He writes, "At the Observatory, we saw the Moon in a twenty-two foot glass, and Jupiter, with his satellites, in the same. The most remote was on the east, and the other three on the west. We also saw Saturn and his rings, in a twelve-foot glass, and one of his satellites."

Cassini initially held the Earth to be the centre of the Solar System, though later observations compelled him to accept the model of the Solar System proposed by Nicolaus Copernicus, and eventually that of Tycho Brahe. "In 1659 he presented a model of the planetary system that was in accord with the hypothesis of Nicolaus Copernicus. In 1661 he developed a method, inspired by Kepler's work, of mapping successive phases of solar eclipses; and in 1662 he published new tables of the sun, based on his observations at San Petronio." Cassini also rejected Newton's theory of gravity, after measurements he conducted which wrongly suggested that the Earth was elongated at its poles. More than forty years of controversy about the subject were closed in favour of Newton's theory after the measurements of the French Geodesic Mission (1736 to 1744) and the Lapponian expedition in 1737 led by Pierre Louis Moreau de Maupertuis.

Cassini was also the first to make successful measurements of longitude by the method suggested by Galileo, using eclipses of the Galilean satellites as a clock.

In 1683, Cassini presented the correct explanation of the phenomenon of zodiacal light. Zodiacal light is a faint glow that extends away from the Sun in the ecliptic plane of the sky, caused by dusty objects in interplanetary space.

Cassini is also credited with introducing Indian Astronomy to Europe. In 1688, the French envoy to Siam (Thailand), Simon de la Loubère, returned to Paris with an obscure manuscript relating to the astronomical traditions of that country, along with a French translation. The Siamese Manuscript, as it is now called, somehow fell into Cassini's hands. He was intrigued enough by it to spend considerable time and effort deciphering its cryptic contents, also determining on the way that the document originated in India. His explication of the manuscript appeared in La Loubère's book on the Kingdom of Siam in 1691.

== Astrologer ==
Attracted to the heavens in his youth, his first interest was in astrology. While young he read widely on the subject, and soon was very knowledgeable about it; this extensive knowledge of astrology led to his first appointment as an astronomer. Later in life he focused almost exclusively on astronomy and all but denounced astrology as he became increasingly involved in the Scientific Revolution.

In 1645 the Marquis Cornelio Malvasia, a senator of Bologna with a great interest in astrology, invited Cassini to Bologna and offered him a position in the Panzano Observatory, which he was constructing at that time. Most of their time was spent calculating newer, better, and more accurate ephemerides for astrological purposes using the rapidly advancing astronomical methods and tools of the day.

== Engineering ==
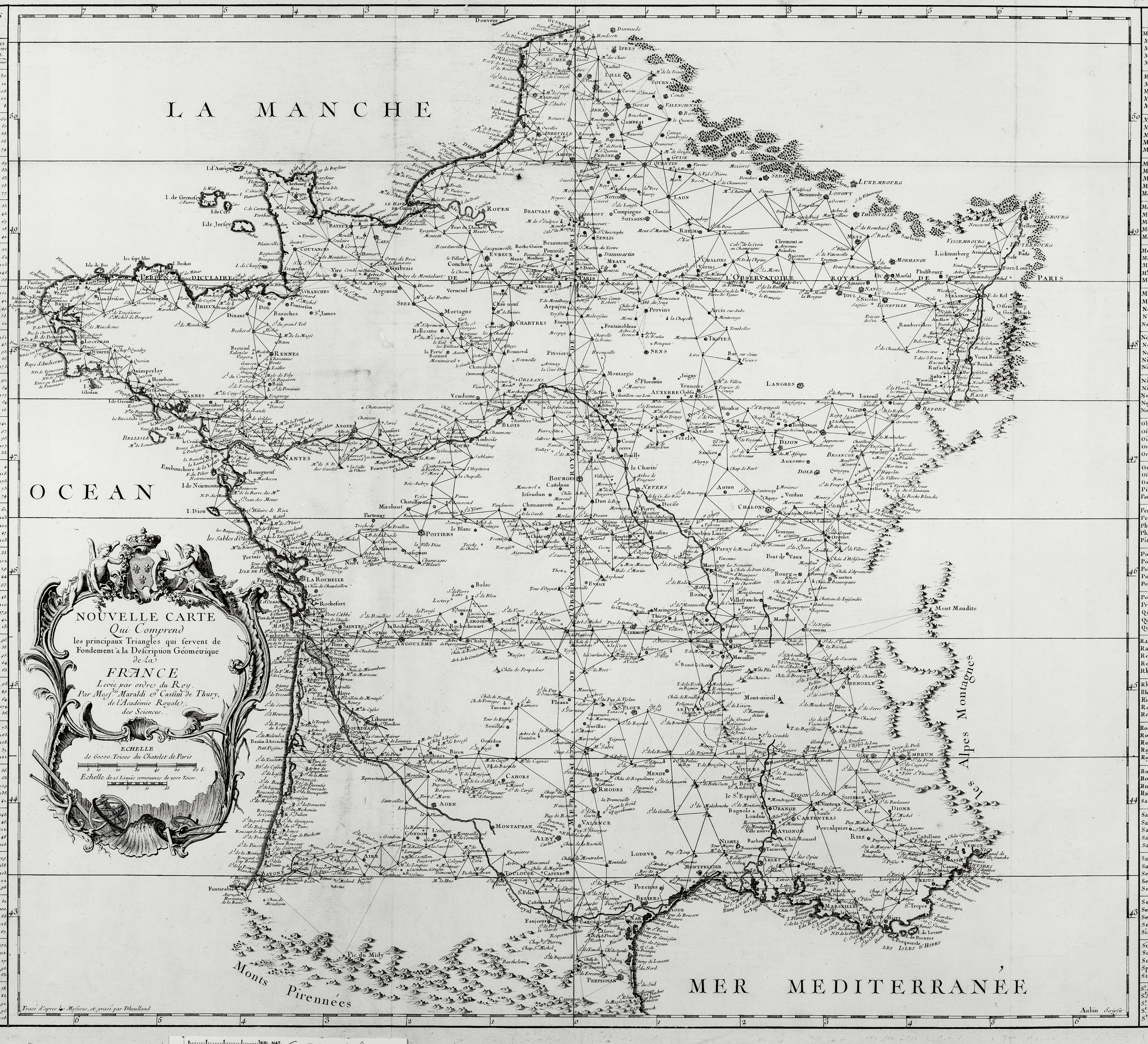
Cassini's map of France, 1744

In 1653, Cassini, wishing to employ the use of a meridian line, sketched a plan for a new and larger meridian line but one that would be difficult to build. His calculations were precise; the construction succeeded perfectly; and its success gave Cassini a brilliant reputation for working with engineering and structural works.

Cassini was employed by Pope Clement IX in regard to fortifications, river management, and flooding of the Po River. "Cassini composed several memoirs on the flooding of the Po River and on the means of avoiding it; moreover, he also carried out experiments in applied hydraulics." In 1663 he was named superintendent of fortifications and in 1665 inspector for Perugia. The Pope asked Cassini to take Holy Orders to work with him permanently but Cassini turned him down because he wanted to work on astronomy full-time.

In the 1670s, Cassini began work on a project to create a topographic map of France, using Gemma Frisius's technique of triangulation. The project was continued by his son Jacques Cassini and eventually finished by his grandson César-François Cassini de Thury and published as the Carte de Cassini in 1789 or 1793. It was the first topographic map of an entire country.

== Works ==
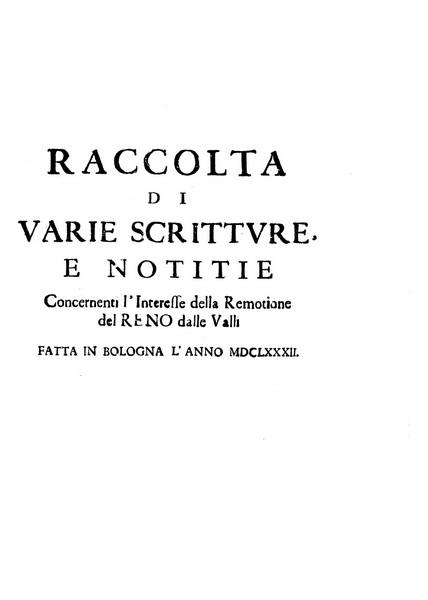
Raccolta di varie scritture (1682)

- Specimen observationum Bononiensium (in Latin). Bologna: eredi Evangelista Dozza (1.). 1656.
- Martis circa axem proprium revolubilis observationes Bononiae habitae (in Latin). Bologna: eredi Evangelista Dozza (1.). 1666.
- Spina celeste meteora osservata in Bologna il mese di marzo 1668 (in Italian). Bologna: Emilio Maria Manolessi & fratelli. 1668.
- Observations astronomiques faites en divers endroits du royaume, pendant l'année 1672 (in French).
- Abregé des observations et des reflections sur la comete qui a paru au mois de Decembre 1680, et aux mois de Ianvier, Fevrier et Mars de cette annee 1681 (in French). Paris: Estienne Michallet. 1681.
- Cassini, Giovanni Domenico (1682). Raccolta di varie scritture, e notitie concernenti l'interesse della remotione del Reno dalle Valli fatta in Bologna l'anno 1682. (In Bologna): [s.n.]
- Elemens de l'astronomie (in French). Paris: Imprimerie Royale. 1684.
- Découverte de la lumiere celeste qui paroist dans le zodiaque (in French). Paris: Imprimerie Royale. 1685.
- Régles de l'astronomie indienne pour calculer les mouvemens du soleil et de la lune (in French). Paris: Sébastien Mabre-Cramoisy, veuve. 1689.
- De l'origine et du progres de l'astronomie et de son usage dans la geographie et dans la navigation (in French). Vol. 1. Paris: Imprimerie Royale. 1693.
- Hypotheses et les tables des satellites de Jupiter, reformeés sur de nouvelles observations (in French). Paris: Jean Anisson. 1693.
- Meridiana del tempio di S. Petronio tirata e preparata per le osservazioni astronomiche l'anno 1655 (in Italian). Bologna: eredi Vittorio Benacci. 1695.
- Description et usage du planisphere céleste (in French).
- Cassini's works digitalized and available on the digital library of Paris Observatory

== See also ==
- 24101 Cassini, an asteroid
- Aerial telescope – large telescopes used by Cassini
- Cassini (lunar crater)
- Cassini (Martian crater)
- Cassini Division in Saturn's rings
- Cassini oval
- Cassini Regio, dark area on Iapetus
- Cassini–Huygens Mission to Saturn
- Cassini's identity for Fibonacci numbers
- Cassini's laws
- History of the metre
- Neith (hypothetical moon)
- Seconds pendulum
