= César-François Cassini de Thury =

French cartographer and astronomer (1714–1784)

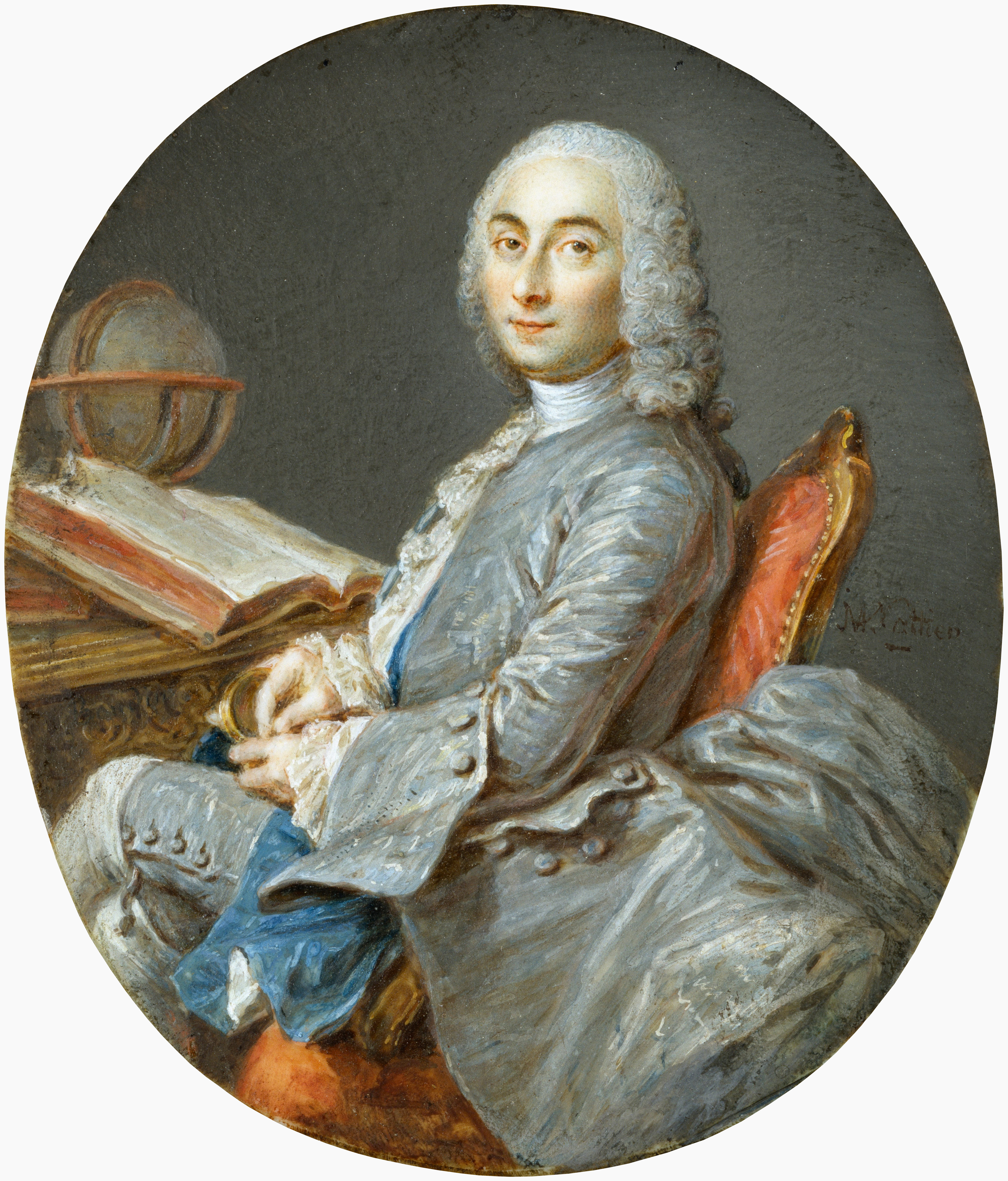
- César-François Cassini de Thury, miniature watercolour on ivory by Jean-Marc Nattier
- Born: 17 June 1714; Thury-sous-Clermont, France
- Died: 4 September 1784 (aged 70); Paris, France
- Known for: Topographical map of France
- Children: Jean-Dominique Cassini
- Scientific career
- Fields: Cartography; Astronomy
- Workplaces: Paris Observatory

César-François Cassini de Thury (17 June 1714 – 4 September 1784), also called Cassini III or Cassini de Thury, was a French astronomer and cartographer.

== Biography ==
Cassini de Thury was born in Thury-sous-Clermont, in the Oise department, the second son of Jacques Cassini and Suzanne Françoise Charpentier de Charmois. He was a grandson of Giovanni Domenico Cassini, and would become the father of Jean-Dominique Cassini, Comte de Cassini.

In 1739, he became a member of the French Academy of Sciences as a supernumerary adjunct astronomer, in 1741 as an adjunct astronomer, and in 1745 as a full member astronomer.

In January 1751, he was elected a Fellow of the Royal Society.

Cassini de Thury succeeded his father's official position in 1756 and continued the hereditary surveying operations. In 1744, he began the construction of a great topographical map of France, one of the landmarks in the history of cartography. Completed by his son Jean-Dominique, Cassini IV and published by the Académie des Sciences from 1744 to 1793, its 180 plates are known as the Cassini map.

The post of director of the Paris Observatory was created for his benefit in 1771 when the establishment ceased to be a dependency of the French Academy of Sciences. A letter and proposal sent by Cassini de Thury to the Royal Society in London instigated the Anglo-French Survey (1784–1790), which measured the precise distance and direction between the Paris Observatory and the Royal Observatory, Greenwich, by way of a trigonometric survey.

His chief works are: La méridienne de l’Observatoire Royal de Paris (1744), an arc measurement correction of the Paris meridian (Dunkirk-Collioure arc measurement (Cassini de Thury and de Lacaille)); Description géométrique de la terre (1775); and Description géométrique de la France (1784), which was completed by his son ("Cassini IV").

César-François Cassini de Thury died of smallpox in Paris on 4 September 1784.

== Works ==
- La méridienne de l’Observatoire Royal de Paris (1744)
- Description géométrique de la terre (1775)
- Description géométrique de la France (1784)
- César-François Cassini de Thury (1775). Relation d'un voyage en Allemagne. Paris: Imprimerie Royale.

== Bibliography ==
D. Aubin, Femmes, vulgarisation et pratique des sciences au siècle des Lumières : Les Dialogues sur l’astronomie et la Lettre sur la figure de la Terre de César-François Cassini de Thury, Brepols (2020)

== See also ==
- Cassini projection
