= Thury-sous-Clermont =

- Commune
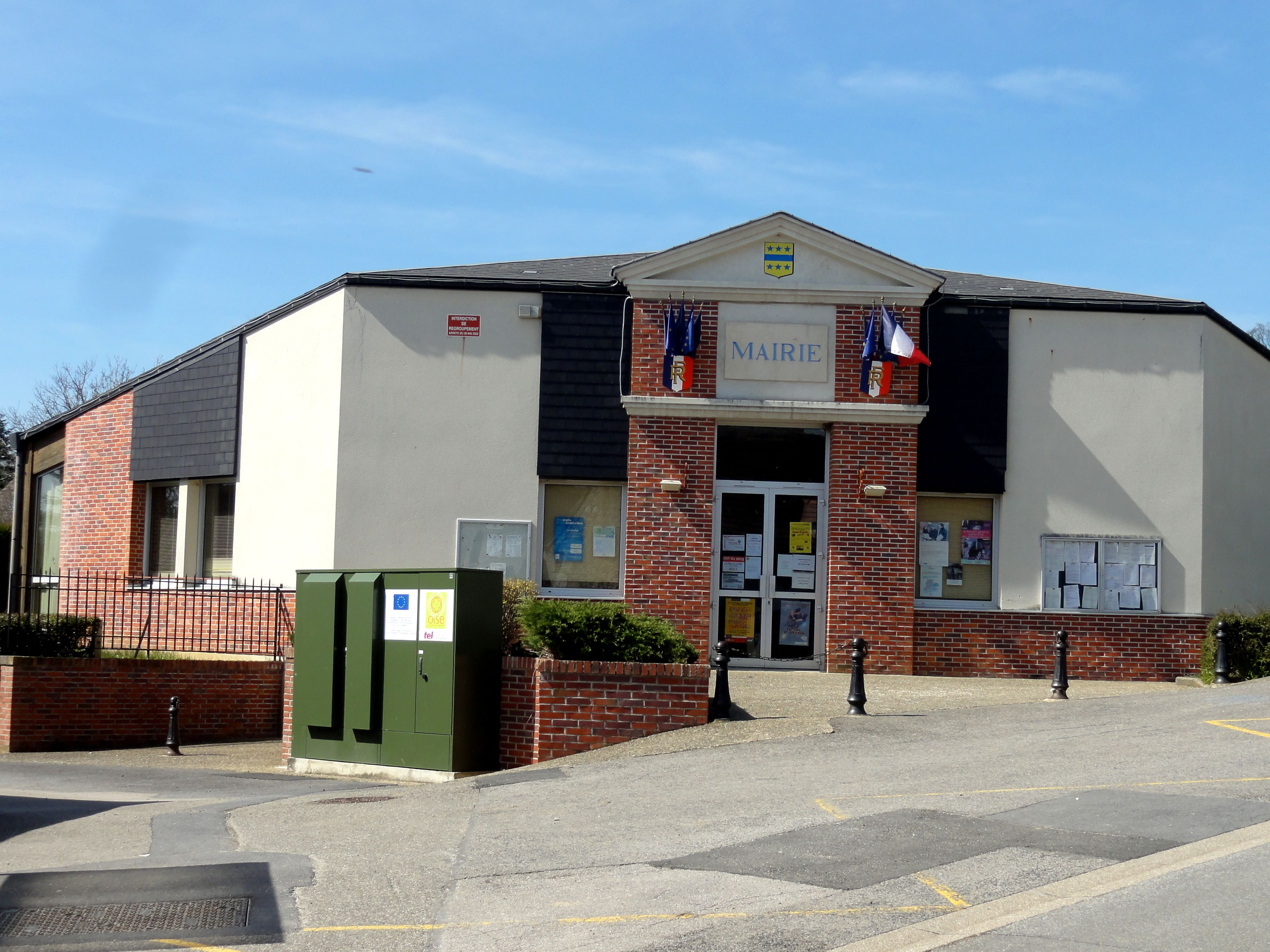
- The town hall in Thury-sous-Clermont

- Coat of arms
- Location of Thury-sous-Clermont
- Location within France Location within Hauts-de-France
- Coordinates: 49°21′27″N 2°19′38″E
- Country: France
- Region: Hauts-de-France
- Department: Oise
- Arrondissement: Clermont
- Canton: Mouy

Government
  - Mayor (2020–2026): Philippe Bourlette
- Area^{1}: 5.42 km^{2} (2.09 sq mi)
- Elevation: 90 m (300 ft)
- Highest elevation: 147 m (482 ft)
- Lowest elevation: 57 m (187 ft)
- Population (2023): 667
  - Density: 123/km^{2} (319/sq mi)
- Time zone: UTC+01:00 (CET)
  - Summer (DST): UTC+02:00 (CEST)
- INSEE/Postal code: 60638 /60250
- ^{1} French Land Register data, which excludes lakes, ponds, glaciers > 1 km^{2} (0.386 sq mi or 247 acres) and river estuaries.

Thury-sous-Clermont (French pronunciation: [tyʁi su klɛʁmɔ̃], literally Thury under Clermont) is a commune in the Oise department in northern France.

== See also ==
- Communes of the Oise department
