= Dominique, comte de Cassini =

French astronomer

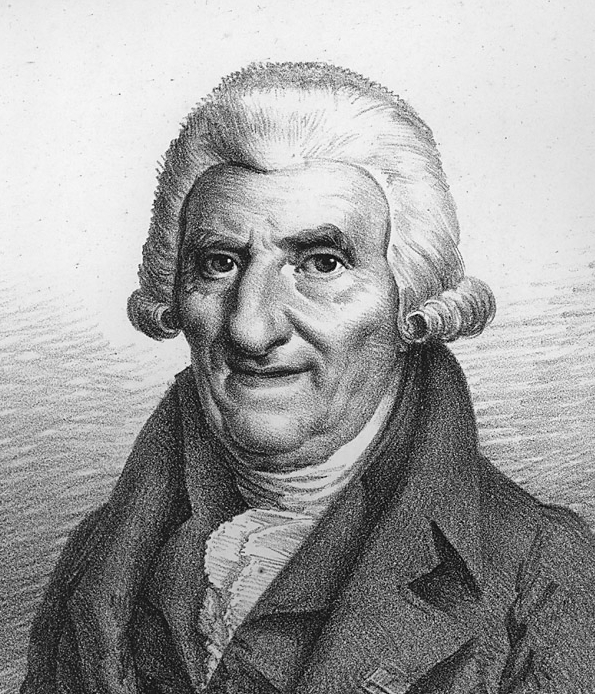
- Jean-Dominique, comte de Cassini, 1820. Lithograph by Julien-Léopold Boilly.
- Born: 30 June 1748; Paris, France
- Died: 18 October 1845 (aged 97); Thury, France
- Citizenship: French
- Known for: Terrestrial surveys
- Children: Henri Cassini

Jean-Dominique, comte de Cassini (30 June 1748 – 18 October 1845), also called Cassini IV, was a French astronomer, son of César-François Cassini de Thury and great-grandson of Giovanni Domenico Cassini.

Cassini was born at the Paris Observatory. He succeeded his father as director of the observatory in 1784; but his plans for its restoration and re-equipment were wrecked in 1793 by the animosity of the National Convention. His position having become intolerable, he resigned on 6 September and was thrown into prison in 1794, but released after seven months. He then withdrew to Thury, where he died in 1845.

In 1770, he published an account of a voyage to America in 1768, undertaken as the commissary of the French Academy of Sciences with a view to testing Pierre Le Roy’s watches at sea. In 1783, his father César-François Cassini de Thury had sent a letter to the Royal Society in London, in which he proposed a trigonometric survey connecting the observatories of Paris and Greenwich for the purpose of better determining the latitude and longitude of the latter. His proposal was accepted, resulting in the Anglo-French Survey (1784–1790). The results of the survey were published in 1791.

Dominique, comte de Cassini visited England with Pierre Méchain and Adrien-Marie Legendre, and the three met William Herschel at Slough. He completed his father's map of France, which was published by the Academy of Sciences in 1793. It served as the basis for the Atlas National (1791), showing France in departments. He was elected a Foreign Honorary Member of the American Academy of Arts and Sciences in 1788.

Cassini's Mémoires pour servir à l’histoire de l’observatoire de Paris (1810) embodied portions of an extensive work, the prospectus of which he had submitted to the Academy of Sciences in 1774. The volume included his Eloges of several academicians, and the biography of his great-grandfather.

His wife was Claude Marie Louise de Lamyre-Mory Comtesse de Neuville (1754–1791) and their youngest son Henri was a botanist.
