= B. S. Sathyaprakash =

Physicist and astronomer

- Sathyaprakash at Penn State in 2026
- Education: Bangalore University; Indian Institute of Technology Madras; Indian Institute of Science
- Known for: Matched filtering methods for compact binary searches; Science case for the Einstein Telescope and Cosmic Explorer
- Awards: Fellow of the Royal Astronomical Society (2006); Fellow of the Institute of Physics (2013); Fellow of the American Physical Society (2019); Special Breakthrough Prize in Fundamental Physics (2016, shared); Buchalter Cosmology Prize (2019)
- Scientific career
- Fields: Gravitational-wave astronomy, general relativity, cosmology
- Workplaces: Pennsylvania State University; Cardiff University; Inter-University Centre for Astronomy and Astrophysics; International Centre for Theoretical Sciences

B. S. Sathyaprakash is a physicist who works on gravitational waves and general relativity. He is the Bert Elsbach Professor of Physics and Professor of Astronomy and Astrophysics at Pennsylvania State University, and an emeritus professor at Cardiff University, where he was Professor of Gravitational Physics.

Sathyaprakash developed signal processing methods for detecting gravitational waves from compact binaries from the early 1990s. With Sanjeev Dhurandhar and later with Thibault Damour, Bala Iyer and Benjamin Owen, he developed matched filtering techniques and methods for placing templates across the parameter space of binary signals. He has also worked on the scientific case for proposed next generation observatories, including the Einstein Telescope and Cosmic Explorer.

He is a member of the LIGO Scientific Collaboration and shared in the 2016 Special Breakthrough Prize in Fundamental Physics awarded to contributors to the first detection of gravitational waves. He was elected a Fellow of the American Physical Society in 2019.

== Early life and education ==
Sathyaprakash studied physics, chemistry and mathematics at National College, Bangalore University, completing a BSc in 1979. He took an MSc in physics at the Indian Institute of Technology Madras in 1981, and a PhD at the Indian Institute of Science in Bangalore in 1987.

His early research was in cosmology and the large-scale structure of the universe, including work with Varun Sahni and Sergei Shandarin on methods for characterising the shapes of large scale structures.

== Career ==
Sathyaprakash was a lecturer in physics at MES College in Bangalore from 1987 to 1988, then held a postdoctoral fellowship from the Council of Scientific and Industrial Research at the Indian Institute of Science. He moved to the Inter-University Centre for Astronomy and Astrophysics in Pune as a postdoctoral fellow from 1989 to 1991, spent 1992 to 1993 at the International Centre for Theoretical Physics in Trieste, and returned to Pune as a scientist from 1993 to 1995. He visited the California Institute of Technology in 1996.

He joined Cardiff University in 1996, where he was successively lecturer, senior lecturer and reader, becoming Professor of Gravitational Physics in 2003. He is now an emeritus professor there. He took up a chair at Pennsylvania State University in 2016 and became the Bert Elsbach Professor of Physics. He was associate director of the Penn State Institute for Gravitation and the Cosmos from 2017 to 2021. He is also an associate of the International Centre for Theoretical Sciences in Bengaluru.

In November 2024 he joined Living Reviews in Relativity as associate editor for gravitational waves, succeeding Bala R. Iyer, who had handled the subject for the journal for twenty-five years.

Sathyaprakash served as vice chair of the American Physical Society Division of Gravitational Physics for the 2023 to 2024 term, entering the division's rotating chair line.

== Research ==
=== Detection methods for compact binaries ===
Much of Sathyaprakash's early gravitational wave research concerned how to extract weak signals from detector noise. In 1991 he and Sanjeev Dhurandhar analysed the choice of filters for detecting gravitational waves from coalescing binaries. This was followed by work with Thibault Damour and Bala Iyer on improved filters for inspiralling compact binaries, and with Benjamin Owen on the computational cost of matched filtering and on how templates should be placed across the space of possible signals. In 2009 he and Bernard Schutz wrote a review of the physics, astrophysics and cosmology accessible through gravitational wave observations for Living Reviews in Relativity.

=== Tests of general relativity ===
Sathyaprakash has worked on using compact binary signals to test general relativity. With Chandra Kant Mishra, K. G. Arun and Bala Iyer he helped formulate parametrized tests of post-Newtonian theory, in which coefficients of the waveform are allowed to deviate from their predicted values and are then constrained by observation. Related work with Alessandra Buonanno and others compared the post-Newtonian waveform families used in searches. More recent work in this area has applied principal component analysis to combine information from several post-Newtonian coefficients at once.

=== Black hole spectroscopy ===
With Ioannis Kamaretsos, Mark Hannam and Sascha Husa, Sathyaprakash showed that the relative amplitudes of these modes carry information about the binary that produced the remnant, so that the ringdown retains a memory of its progenitor. With Sarah Gossan and John Veitch he developed a Bayesian framework for testing the no-hair theorem using more than one ringdown mode.

In 2026, with Monica Rincon-Ramirez, Nathan K. Johnson-McDaniel, Eugenio Bianchi, Ish Gupta and Vaishak Prasad, he proposed a maximum entropy conjecture for black hole mergers. The resulting predictions agree with numerical relativity simulations to within a few per cent.

=== Neutron stars and dense matter ===
Sathyaprakash has worked on inferring the neutron star equation of state from gravitational wave observations, both from tidal effects during inspiral and from oscillations of the merger remnant. With Aviral Prakash and others he examined whether a QCD phase transition in a binary neutron star merger would leave a detectable signature. Work with Arnab Dhani and others considered prompt collapse to a black hole following a merger and what it implies for the equation of state.

=== Cosmology ===
Sathyaprakash, Schutz and Chris Van Den Broeck argued that a third generation detector could use such measurements to constrain the dark energy equation of state. Sathyaprakash worked with Chris Messenger, Kentaro Takami, Sarah Gossan and Luciano Rezzolla on using tidal effects in binary neutron stars to break the degeneracy between mass and redshift, allowing both to be inferred from the gravitational wave signal alone.

=== Next generation observatories ===
Sathyaprakash was the first author of a 2012 paper setting out the scientific objectives of the Einstein Telescope, a proposed European third generation detector. He was also among the authors of the Horizon Study for Cosmic Explorer.

== Awards and honours ==
- Sathyaprakash was elected a Fellow of the Royal Astronomical Society in 2006, of the Institute of Physics in 2013, and of both the American Physical Society and the International Society on General Relativity and Gravitation in 2019.
- In 2019 he shared second prize in the Buchalter Cosmology Prize with Eugenio Bianchi, Anuradha Gupta and Hal M. Haggard.
- He received a Distinguished Alumni Award from the Indian Institute of Technology Madras in 2021.
- As a member of the LIGO Scientific Collaboration he shared in the 2016 Special Breakthrough Prize in Fundamental Physics.

== Selected publications ==
- Sathyaprakash, B. S.; Dhurandhar, S. V. (1991). "Choice of filters for the detection of gravitational waves from coalescing binaries". Physical Review D. 44 (12): 3819–3834. doi:10.1103/PhysRevD.44.3819.
- Damour, T.; Iyer, B. R.; Sathyaprakash, B. S. (1998). "Improved filters for gravitational waves from inspiralling compact binaries". Physical Review D. 57 (2): 885–907. arXiv:gr-qc/9708034. doi:10.1103/PhysRevD.57.885.
- Owen, B. J.; Sathyaprakash, B. S. (1999). "Matched filtering of gravitational waves from inspiraling compact binaries: Computational cost and template placement". Physical Review D. 60 (2) 022002. arXiv:gr-qc/9808076. doi:10.1103/PhysRevD.60.022002.
- Sathyaprakash, B. S.; Schutz, B. F. (2009). "Physics, astrophysics and cosmology with gravitational waves". Living Reviews in Relativity. 12 2. doi:10.12942/lrr-2009-2. PMC 5255530.
- Mishra, C. K.; Arun, K. G.; Iyer, B. R.; Sathyaprakash, B. S. (2010). "Parametrized tests of post-Newtonian theory using Advanced LIGO and Einstein Telescope". Physical Review D. 82 (6) 064010. arXiv:1005.0304. doi:10.1103/PhysRevD.82.064010.
- Sathyaprakash, B. S.; et al. (2012). "Scientific objectives of Einstein Telescope". Classical and Quantum Gravity. 29 (12) 124013. arXiv:1206.0331. doi:10.1088/0264-9381/29/12/124013.
