= Anne-Christine Davis =

British theoretical physicist

- Education: University of Bristol
- Awards: IOP Richard Glazebrook Medal and Prize (2019); Buchalter Cosmology Prize (2021) [OBE] (2024)
- Scientific career
- Fields: Cosmology, Astrophysics
- Workplaces: DAMTP, University of Cambridge
- Doctoral advisor: W. Noel Cottingham
- Doctoral students: João Magueijo; Claudia de Rham; Mahbubul Alam Majumdar; Clare Burrage
- Website: Cambridge website

Anne-Christine Davis is a British theoretical physicist at the University of Cambridge. She was the first woman to be appointed a professor in the Faculty of Mathematics at the university. Her research mainly concerns cosmology, astrophysics and string theory.

Davis was a graduate student at Bristol University, under the supervision of W. Noel Cottingham. She obtained her doctorate in 1975. Davis held postdoctoral positions at Durham University (1976-1978) and Imperial College London in the research group of Tom Kibble (1978-1980). Davis worked overseas at CERN in Geneva, Switzerland (where she became the first female theoretician) and at the Institute for Advanced Study in Princeton (1982-1983). Since 1983 she has held positions at DAMTP, Cambridge, and King's College, Cambridge. From 2002 to 2013 she was professor of theoretical physics at DAMTP and from 2013 to 2018 she held the "Professorship of Mathematical Physics (1967)". She has been a member of the general board and the council of the University of Cambridge. Davis was the first female professor in the faculty of mathematics at Cambridge. Davis served as Cambridge University's Gender Equality Champion for STEMM from 2014 to 2017.

Davis' recent work has focused on particle cosmology, in particular investigating the chameleon theory and its relation to f(R) theory.

Davis retired in 2018 but worked and published as Emeritus Professor earning the Buchalter Cosmology Prize for a paper she co-authored.

== Early life ==
Davis first became interested in science at the age of five.

When I first started school, the teacher put flash cards up: A is for apple, B is for banana, C is for I can't remember what, to teach us all the alphabet. Fine, okay. Then she did it again. And I thought, "That's strange. She's done that once. We all know this now, why's she doing it again?" And the teacher picked this up, that I had learnt my alphabet first time round, and gave me a bucket of water and a pipette to play with. And I learnt a little bit about specific gravity. And I thought, "Oh, I want to be a scientist. This is fun."

She then became the only woman at her school to pursue A-levels in mathematics, physics, and chemistry.

== Recognition ==
In 2009 she was elected to the Academia Europaea. In 2019 she won the Institute of Physics Richard Glazebrook Medal and Prize. Davis was awarded the OBE in the King's Birthday Honors 2024 for her services. In 2026, Davis was selected as a Fellow into the inaugural cohort of the Academy for the Mathematical Sciences.
