= Léo Houziaux (astronomer) =

Belgian astronomer (1932–2026)

- Born: 23 March 1932; Rochefort, Belgium
- Died: 30 March 2026 (aged 94); Namur, Belgium
- Education: University of Liège
- Occupation: Astronomer

Léo Houziaux (23 March 1932 – 30 March 2026) was a Belgian astronomer. A member of the Royal Academy of Science, Letters and Fine Arts of Belgium and the European Academy of Sciences and Arts, he was a recipient of the Order of Leopold (1978).

In 2016, the International Astronomical Union named Eric Walter Elst's asteroid 24945 in Houziaux's honor.

Houziaux died in Namur on 30 March 2026, at the age of 94.
