= List of Amor asteroid records =

The following is a list of current records for Amor asteroids.

Record	Object	Value
Discovery Records		Year
First Discovered	433 Eros	1898
First Recognised	1221 Amor	1932
Physical Records		Absolute; Magnitude	Diameter
Largest / Brightest	1036 Ganymed	9.45	~34.28 km
Dimmest (Named)	164215 Doloreshill	20.0	~340 m
Dimmest (Numbered)	(256004) 2006 UP	23.0	~85 m
Dimmest	2006 RH120	29.5	~4 m
Orbit Records
Perihelion Records		q (au)
Smallest	(381181) 2007 LV19	1.00004
Smallest (named)	3671 Dionysus	1.006
Largest (named)	6456 Golombek	1.297
Largest (numbered)	(276274) 2002 SS41	1.2992
Largest	(431776) 2008 JQ24	1.29995
Semi-Major Axis Records		a (au)
Smallest	1992 JD	1.033
Smallest (numbered)	(385186) 1994 AW1	1.105
Smallest (named)	15817 Lucianotesi	1.325
Largest (numbered)	3552 Don Quixote	4.222
Largest	2009 AT	4.261
Aphelion Records		Q (au)
Smallest	2006 RH120	1.059
Smallest (numbered)	(385186) 1994 AW1	1.188
Smallest (named)	15817 Lucianotesi	1.481
Largest (numbered)	3552 Don Quixote	7.232
Largest	2007 VA85	7.336
Eccentricity Records		e
Smallest	2008 CO	0.012
Smallest (numbered)	(329340) 2001 LM5	0.035
Smallest (named)	15817 Lucianotesi	0.118
Largest (numbered)	3552 Don Quixote	0.713
Largest	2007 VA85	0.736
Inclination Records		i (deg)
Lowest	2005 TD15	0.096
Lowest (numbered)	(213053) 1998 WT30	0.51
Lowest (named)	11284 Belenus	1.99
Highest (named)	1580 Betulia	52.1
Highest (numbered)	(138925) 2001 AU43	72.2
Highest	2007 VA85	131.9
