= Tony Padilla =

Tony Padilla may refer to:

- Tony Padilla (13 Reasons Why), fictional character in the Netflix television series
- Antonio Padilla, English physics professor and Numberphile contributor
