= Mahbubul Alam Majumdar =

Bangladeshi academic and researcher

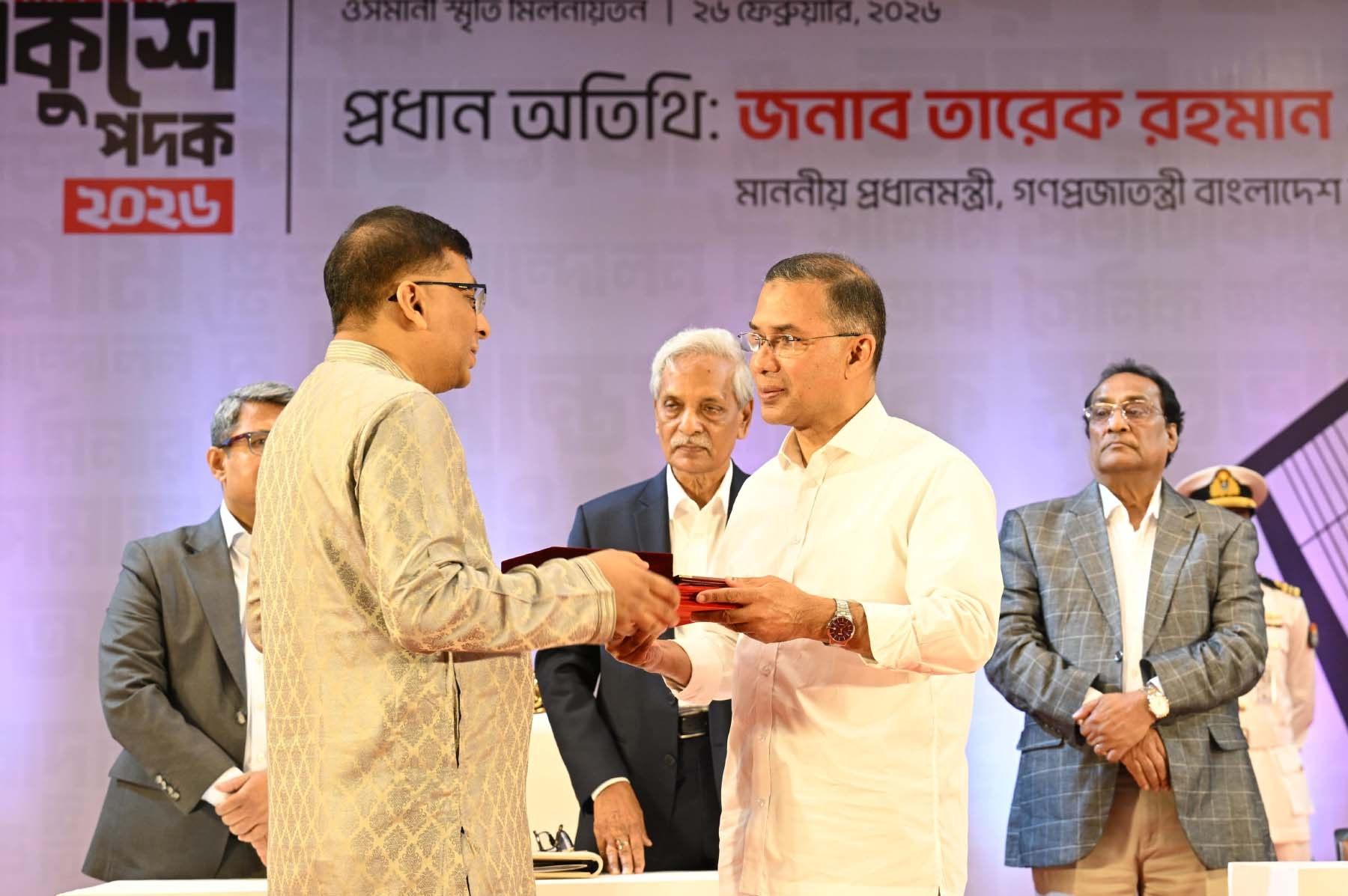
- Majumdar receives Ekushey Padak from Prime Minister Tarique Rahman in 2026
- Born: 1971 (age 54–55); Dhaka, Bangladesh
- Education: Massachusetts Institute of Technology; Stanford University; University of Cambridge
- Known for: Bangladesh Mathematical Olympiad; ICTP PWF Jamal Nazrul Islam Memorial Winter School
- Awards: Ekushey Padak (Education, 2026) Spirit of Abdus Salam Award
- Scientific career
- Fields: Theoretical Physics, String Theory, Cosmology, Computer Science, Machine Learning, AI
- Workplaces: BRAC University
- Doctoral advisor: Anne-Christine Davis
- Website: BRACU Profile

Mahbubul Alam Majumdar (also known as Mahbub Majumdar) is a Bangladeshi academic and researcher who is the Dean of the School of Data and Sciences at BRAC University and the national coach of the Bangladesh Mathematical Olympiad team. In 2026, he received the Spirit of Abdus Salam Award (Spirit of Salam) from the International Centre for Theoretical Physics for efforts to strengthen Bangladesh's scientific and educational foundations. In the same year, he was awarded the Ekushey Padak in the education category by the Government of Bangladesh.

== Early life and education ==
Majumdar was born in 1971 in Dhaka to Badiul Alam Majumdar, a Bangladeshi economist and civil society activist, and Tazima Hossain Majumdar. He grew up in the United States. He completed high school in Washington and attended the Massachusetts Institute of Technology, where he earned a Bachelor of Science (SB) degree in electrical engineering and theoretical physics. He subsequently obtained a Master of Science degree in mechanical engineering from Stanford University and moved to the United Kingdom to pursue doctoral studies in mathematical physics at the University of Cambridge.

His doctoral supervisor was Anne-Christine Davis. After completing his PhD, Majumdar held a postdoctoral position at Imperial College London.

== Career ==
Majumdar returned to Bangladesh in 2005 and joined North South University. In 2014, he joined BRAC University and later became Chairperson of the Department of Computer Science and Engineering. He currently serves as Dean of the School of Data and Sciences. During this period, he also developed an active student community and offered courses in theoretical physics beyond the regular curriculum.

During the COVID-19 pandemic, BRAC University launched buX, an asynchronous online learning platform, under his supervision. In 2025, Majumdar organized the Jamal Nazrul Islam Memorial Winter School in Mathematical and Theoretical Physics in collaboration with the ICTP's Physics Without Frontiers program, bringing leading global physicists—including Ashoke Sen, Fernando Quevedo, and Suvrat Raju—to Bangladesh to train and mentor local students and young researchers.

Majumdar is also a member of the National AI Steering Committee under the ICT Ministry of Bangladesh.

== Mathematics Olympiad work ==
Majumdar has coached Bangladesh's national Mathematics Olympiad team since 2005 and has been credited for building a nationwide mathematics olympiad pipeline. Under this pipeline, Bangladesh won its first gold medal at the International Mathematical Olympiad (IMO) in 2018. He has also been involved with Bangladesh's Girls' Mathematical Olympiad initiative since its inception and has written publicly on encouraging girls to be involved in mathematics.

== Research ==
Majumdar's research includes string cosmology and inflationary cosmology. Among his most widely cited publications is the paper “The Inflationary Brane–Antibrane Universe” (Journal of High Energy Physics, 2001), which studied string-theoretic models of cosmic inflation involving brane–antibrane dynamics and tachyon condensation. He also authored “A Tutorial on Links between Cosmic String Theory and Superstring Theory” (2005), which discusses connections between cosmic strings and superstring theory.

== Awards and honors ==
- Ekushey Padak, education category in 2026, presented by Prime Minister Tarique Rahman at Osmani Memorial Auditorium, Dhaka
- Spirit of Abdus Salam Award 2026, presented by the family of Nobel laureate Abdus Salam and the ICTP
- Winner of the National Bicentennial Writing Competition in 1987, awarded by U.S. President Ronald Reagan, for an essay titled "Constitution—How Does the Separation of Powers Make It Work?".

== Selected publications ==
- Burgess, Clifford P.; Majumdar, Mahbub; Nolte, Detlef; Quevedo, Fernando; Rajesh, Govindan; Zhang, Ren-Jie (2001). "The inflationary brane-antibrane universe". Journal of High Energy Physics (7): 047. arXiv:hep-th/0105204. Bibcode:2001JHEP...07..047B. doi:10.1088/1126-6708/2001/07/047.
- Majumdar, Mahbub (2005). "A Tutorial on Links between Cosmic String Theory and Superstring Theory". arXiv:hep-th/0512062.
