= Eugenio Bianchi =

Italian theoretical physicist

- Born: 16 February 1979 (age 47); Faicchio, Italy
- Education: Scuola Normale Superiore di Pisa
- Known for: Bekenstein-Hawking formula Loop quantum gravity
- Awards: Buchalter Cosmology Prize (2019); Bronstein Prize (2013); Banting Fellowship (2012); Marie Curie Fellowship (2009)
- Scientific career
- Fields: Theoretical physics
- Workplaces: Pennsylvania State University, Perimeter Institute, Aix-Marseille Université
- Doctoral advisor: Pietro Menotti

Eugenio Bianchi is an Italian theoretical physicist and professor of physics at the Pennsylvania State University who works on loop quantum gravity and black hole thermodynamics. He has derived the Bekenstein-Hawking formula $S=\frac{A}{4}$ for the entropy of non-extremal black holes from loop quantum gravity, for all values of the Immirzi parameter.

== Education and career ==
Bianchi studied at the Scuola Normale Superiore di Pisa, completing his doctorate in 2010 under the supervision of Pietro Menotti. He was a postdoctoral researcher at the Centre de Physique Théorique in Marseille from 2009 to 2011, and at the Perimeter Institute for Theoretical Physics in Canada from 2011 to 2014.

He joined the faculty of Pennsylvania State University in 2014, where he is a member of the Institute for Gravitation and the Cosmos. He was promoted to professor of physics with effect from 1 July 2026.

== Research ==
Bianchi works on the quantum nature of spacetime geometry, drawing on general relativity, quantum field theory and quantum information. Entanglement is central to this work, which he has applied to the primordial state of the universe, the late stages of black hole evaporation, and the thermalisation of isolated quantum systems.

Within loop quantum gravity he has studied the discrete geometry of quantum spacetime, including the description of grains of space as polyhedra, and the propagation of gravitons on such a background. In 2012 he derived the Bekenstein–Hawking entropy formula for non-extremal black holes within the theory, obtaining it for all values of the Immirzi parameter rather than for a single tuned value. He has also proposed, with collaborators, that white holes could form the end state of black hole evaporation.

In 2026, with Monica Rincon-Ramirez, Nathan K. Johnson-McDaniel, Ish Gupta, Vaishak Prasad and B. S. Sathyaprakash, he proposed a maximum entropy conjecture for black hole mergers. The conjecture holds that the remnant of a merger settles into the configuration of maximum entropy once the energy and angular momentum carried away by gravitational waves are accounted for, and the resulting predictions agree with numerical relativity simulations to within a few per cent.

With Abhay Ashtekar he wrote a review of loop quantum gravity for Reports on Progress in Physics in 2021.

== Awards ==
Bianchi was the inaugural recipient of the Bronstein Prize in 2013. The prize is administered by the International Society for Loop Quantum Gravity and recognises postdoctoral researchers in the field. It was established at a meeting in Madrid marking twenty-five years of loop quantum gravity and is named after the Soviet physicist Matvei Bronstein, who argued that a quantum theory of gravity would require a fundamental revision of classical ideas about spacetime. His citation was "for his insightful contributions to black hole entropy, the discrete geometry of quantum spacetime and the propagation of gravitons thereon".

In 2019 he shared second prize in the Buchalter Cosmology Prize with Anuradha Gupta, Hal M. Haggard and B. S. Sathyaprakash, for work proposing a test of Bekenstein–Hawking entropy using the spins of black holes measured in gravitational-wave observations.

He held a Banting Postdoctoral Fellowship in 2012 and a Marie Curie Fellowship in 2009.

== Selected publications ==
- Bianchi, Eugenio; Modesto, Leonardo; Rovelli, Carlo; Speziale, Simone (2006). "Graviton propagator in loop quantum gravity". Classical and Quantum Gravity. 23 (23): 6989–7028. arXiv:gr-qc/0604044. Bibcode:2006CQGra..23.6989B. doi:10.1088/0264-9381/23/23/024.
- Bianchi, Eugenio; Doná, Pietro; Speziale, Simone (2011). "Polyhedra in loop quantum gravity". Physical Review D. 83 (4) 044035. arXiv:1009.3402. Bibcode:2011PhRvD..83d4035B. doi:10.1103/PhysRevD.83.044035.
- Bianchi, Eugenio; Myers, Robert C. (2014). "On the architecture of spacetime geometry". Classical and Quantum Gravity. 31 (21) 214002. arXiv:1212.5183. Bibcode:2014CQGra..31u4002B. doi:10.1088/0264-9381/31/21/214002.
- Bianchi, Eugenio; Christodoulou, Marios; D'Ambrosio, Fabio; Haggard, Hal M.; Rovelli, Carlo (2018). "White holes as remnants: a surprising scenario for the end of a black hole". Classical and Quantum Gravity. 35 (22): 225003. arXiv:1802.04264. Bibcode:2018CQGra..35v5003B. doi:10.1088/1361-6382/aae550.
- Ashtekar, Abhay; Bianchi, Eugenio (2021). "A short review of loop quantum gravity". Reports on Progress in Physics. 84 (4): 042001. arXiv:2104.04394. Bibcode:2021RPPh...84d2001A. doi:10.1088/1361-6633/abed91. PMID 33691292.
