= Hiranya Peiris =

British astrophysicist (born 1974)

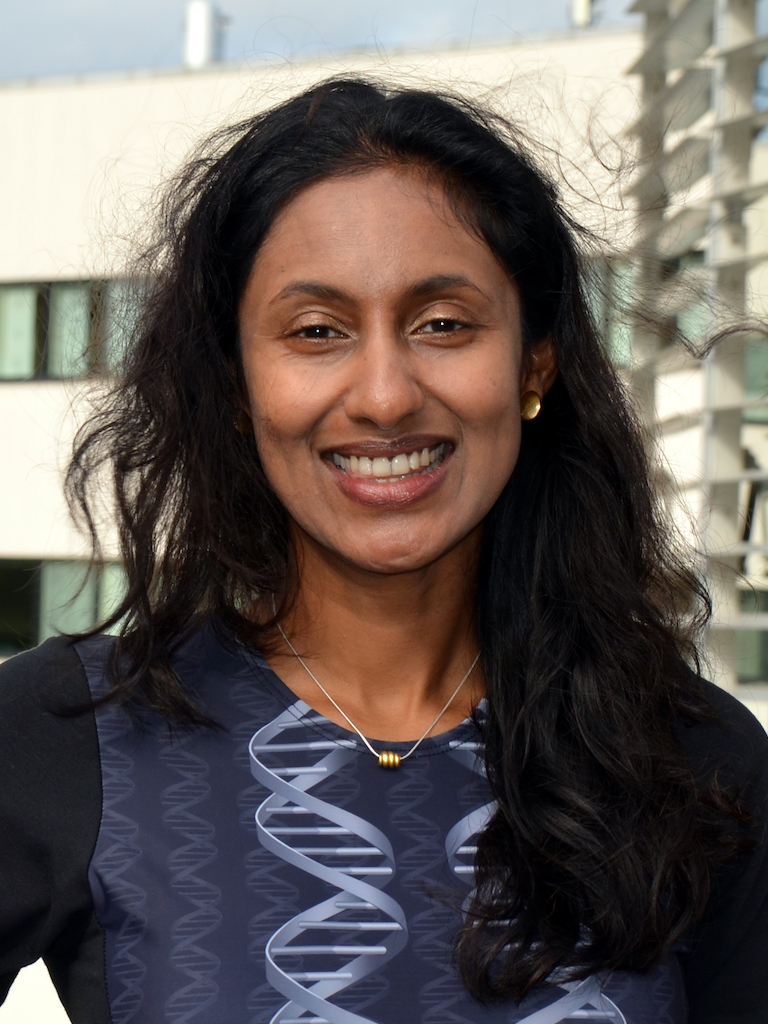
- Peiris in 2016
- Born: Hiranya Vajramani Peiris; April 29, 1974 (age 52); Sri Lanka
- Education: University of Cambridge (BA); Princeton University (PhD)
- Awards: Eddington Medal (2021); Max Born Medal and Prize (2021); Fred Hoyle Medal and Prize (2018); Breakthrough Prize in Fundamental Physics (2018); Gruber Prize in Cosmology (2012)
- Scientific career
- Fields: Physics
- Workplaces: University College London; Stockholm University; University of Chicago; University of Cambridge
- Thesis: First year Wilkinson microwave anisotropy probe results : cosmological parameters and implications for inflation (2003)
- Doctoral advisor: David Spergel
- Website: www.ast.cam.ac.uk/people/Hiranya.Peiris

Hiranya Vajramani Peiris is a British astrophysicist at the University of Cambridge, where she holds the Professorship of Astrophysics (1909). She is best known for her work on the cosmic microwave background radiation, and interdisciplinary links between cosmology and high-energy physics. She was one of 27 scientists who received the Breakthrough Prize in Fundamental Physics in 2018 for their "detailed maps of the early universe".

== Education and early life ==
Peiris was born in Sri Lanka. She completed the Natural Sciences Tripos at University of Cambridge in 1998, as an undergraduate student of New Hall, Cambridge. She earned a PhD at Princeton University from the department of astrophysical Sciences with advisor David Spergel, where she first worked on the Wilkinson Microwave Anisotropy Probe (WMAP).

== Career and research ==
After her PhD, she went on to work at the Kavli Institute for Cosmological Physics at the University of Chicago as a Hubble fellow. Having held several competitive postdoctoral fellowships, in 2007 Peiris returned to the University of Cambridge as a Science and Technology Facilities Council (STFC) advanced fellow and was awarded a junior research fellowship at King's College, Cambridge in 2008. In 2009, Peiris won a Leverhulme Trust award for cosmology and secured a faculty position at University College London.

She is currently Professor of Astrophysics (1909) at the Institute of Astronomy, Cambridge. She was previously the Director of the Oskar Klein Centre for Cosmoparticle Physics at Stockholm University, and a Professor of Astrophysics at University College London.

In 2012, the WMAP team (including Peiris) won the Gruber Cosmology Prize for their "exquisite measurements of anisotropies in the relic radiation from the Big Bang—the Cosmic Microwave Background". WMAP's results on cosmic inflation, which Peiris contributed to, were described by Stephen Hawking as "the most exciting development in physics during his career".

She was skeptical about the 2014 announcement of the discovery of primordial gravitational waves in the cosmic microwave background: "If they announce gravitational waves on Monday then I will need a great deal of convincing. But if they do have a robust detection ... Jesus wow! I'll be taking next week off." Her skepticism proved well-founded: on 30 January 2015, a joint analysis of BICEP2 and Planck data was published and the European Space Agency announced that the signal can be entirely attributed to dust in the Milky Way, though (non-primordial) gravitational waves have since been detected by different experiments.

In 2018, Peiris was awarded the Hoyle Medal and Prize of the UK Institute of Physics for "her leading contributions to understanding the origin and evolution of cosmic structure."

In 2020 Peiris was awarded the Göran Gustafsson Prize in physics by the Göran Gustafsson Foundation and the Royal Swedish Academy of Sciences "for her innovative research on the dynamics of the early universe, which links cosmological observations to basic physics". She was also elected as a member of STFC Council, the senior strategic advisory body of the research council that funds particle physics and astronomy in the United Kingdom.

In 2021, Peiris was awarded the Max Born Medal and Prize by the German Physical Society and the Eddington Medal of the Royal Astronomical Society in recognition of her contributions to cosmology.

Peiris was elected as a Foreign Member in the Physics Class of the Royal Swedish Academy of Sciences (KVA) in May 2022. In 2023, Peiris was appointed Professor of Astrophysics (1909) at the Institute of Astronomy, Cambridge.

=== Public engagement ===
Alongside academic talks, Peiris gives public lectures about cosmology. She has written articles and given interviews for both radio and print media. She has appeared on podcasts, television programs and the national news. In 2013 she gave a talk at TEDxCERN, "Multiplying Dimensions". That year she was selected as one of Astronomy's top ten rising stars by Astronomy Magazine.

In 2014, the pseudonymously-written Ephraim Hardcastle diary column in the Daily Mail claimed that Peiris (along with Maggie Aderin-Pocock) had been selected to discuss results from the Background Imaging of Cosmic Extragalactic Polarization 2 (BICEP-2) experiment on BBC Newsnight because of her gender and ethnicity. These comments were condemned by mainstream media, the Royal Astronomical Society and Peiris' employer, University College London, and the Daily Mail and its column backed down within days. Peiris offered a rebuttal, "Groundbreaking science is blind to prejudice" in Times Higher Education.

In 2017, Peiris collaborated with artist Penelope Rose Cowley to create artwork entitled "Cosmoparticle". In 2018 Peiris contributed to an artwork by artist Goshka Macuga, which was exhibited at a 2019 exhibition held at the Bildmuseet, Sweden, featuring works by 14 international artists inspired by particle physics.

=== Awards and honours ===
Peiris was a member of the 27-person team awarded the 2018 Breakthrough Prize in Fundamental Physics. The US $3 million award was given for the detailed maps of the early universe generated from WMAP. WMAP is a NASA explorer mission that was launched in 2001, which has transformed modern cosmology. Other prizes include:

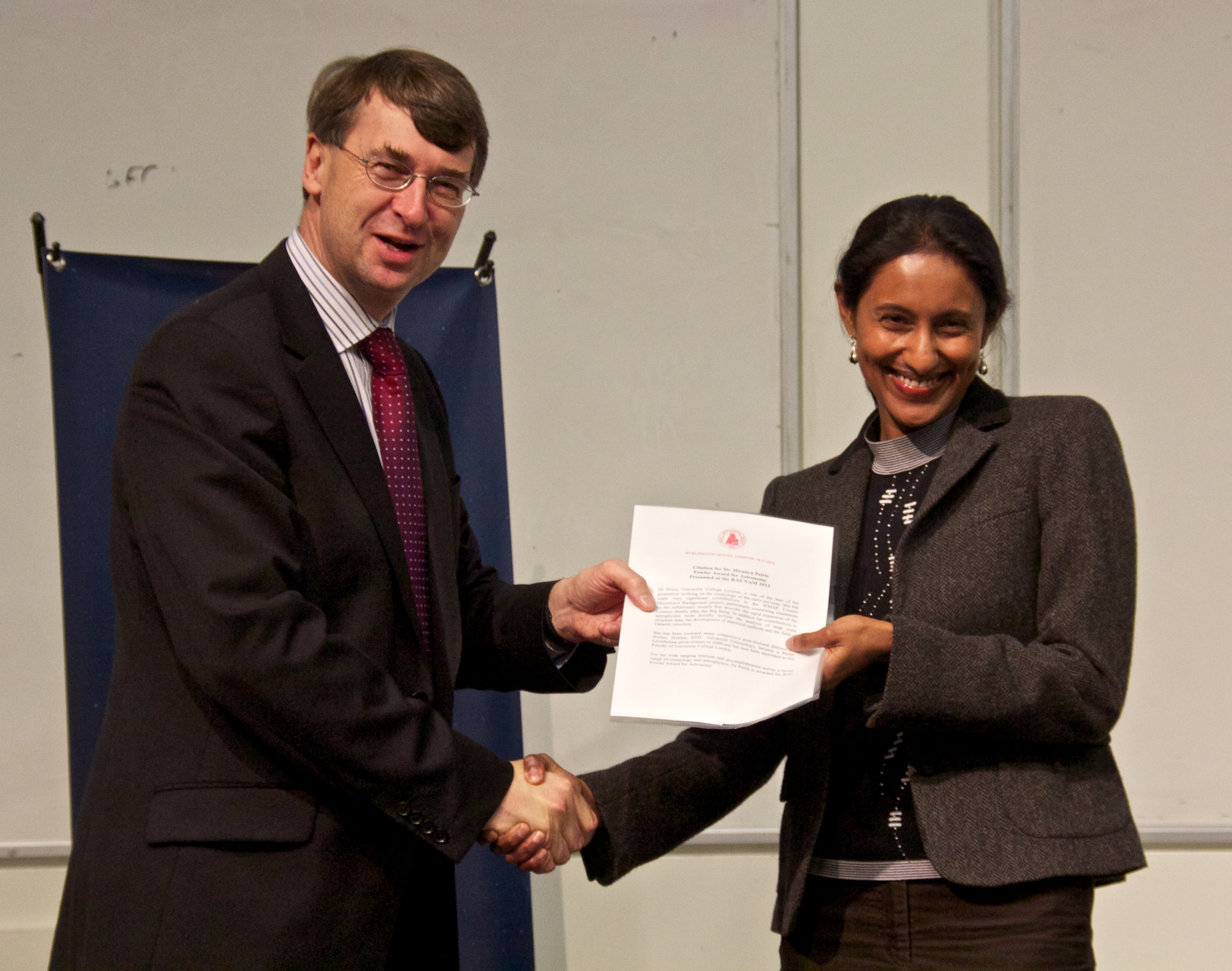
Peiris receiving the Fowler Prize in 2012 from Roger Davies

- 2022 – Elected a member of the Royal Swedish Academy of Sciences
- 2021 – ERC Advanced Grant
- 2021 – Eddington Medal, Royal Astronomical Society
- 2021 – Max Born Medal and Prize of the Institute of Physics and the German Physical Society
- 2020 – Göran Gustafsson Prize in Physics, Göran Gustafsson Foundation and the Royal Swedish Academy of Sciences
- 2018 – Buchalter Cosmology Prize
- 2018 – Fred Hoyle Medal and Prize, Institute of Physics
- 2018 – Breakthrough Prize in Fundamental Physics
- 2014 – Buchalter Cosmology Prize
- 2012 – Gruber Prize for Cosmology, Gruber Foundation
- 2012 – Fowler Prize, Royal Astronomical Society
- 2009 – Philip Leverhulme Prize, Leverhulme Trust
- 2007 – Halliday Prize, STFC
- 2007 – Kavli Frontiers Fellow, National Academy of Sciences
