= Clare Burrage =

British particle physicist

- Born: Clare Joanna Burrage
- Education: University of Cambridge (PhD)
- Awards: Maxwell Medal and Prize (2015)
- Scientific career
- Fields: Dark energy
- Workplaces: University of Nottingham; DESY; University of Geneva
- Thesis: Scalar Fields and the Accelerated Expansion of the Universe (2008)
- Doctoral advisor: Anne-Christine Davis
- Website: www.nottingham.ac.uk/physics/people/clare.burrage

Clare Joanna Burrage is a British particle physicist at the University of Nottingham. She has made significant contributions to dark energy research, using astrophysical probes and interferometry.

== Early life and education ==
Burrage attributes her love of cosmology to driving past the Lovell Telescope at Jodrell Bank Observatory as a child. She attended Collingwood College, Surrey, achieving A-Levels in Mathematics, Further Mathematics, Physics and German. She studied Mathematics at the University of Cambridge, earning a Masters in 2004 and Part III of the Mathematical Tripos in 2005. Whilst a student, Burrage worked at Legoland Windsor Resort. For her postgraduate research, she joined Anne-Christine Davis in the Department of Applied Maths and Theoretical Physics, studying Scalar Fields and the Accelerated Expansion of the Universe. She spotted signs of the elusive chameleon particle in the active galactic nucleus of Messier 87.

== Research and career ==
Burrage was appointed as a postdoctoral fellow in the theoretical physics group at DESY in 2008. Whilst at DESY she found astrophysical evidence for axion-photon conversion. She moved to the University of Geneva in 2010, working in cosmology. In 2011 Burrage was appointed the Anne McLaren Research Fellow at the University of Nottingham. Burrage uses observation of light from astrophysical sources to test for dark energy. She was awarded a Royal Society research fellowship in 2013 and again in 2018. Burrage works with the Centre for Cold Matter at Imperial College London, where she develops light-pulse atom interferometers to accelerate atoms for force sensing. By combining astrophysical observations with atomic techniques, Burrage has provided the best constraints on the various ways dark energy can interact with matter.

=== Public engagement ===
Burrage has taken part in several public engagement activities, including I'm a Scientist, Get Me Out of Here. She was part of a pairing program with a member of parliament and has presented her work at the Palace of Westminster. She has taken part in the Edinburgh International Festival and Hay Festival. She was selected by the British Council to represent the UK in Science Alive in Hong Kong. She has taken part in the award-winning physics video series Sixty Symbols.

Burrage was interviewed by Morgan Freeman in season 2 of Through the Wormhole.

== Recognition ==
Burrage won the 2015 Institute of Physics Maxwell Medal and Prize. In 2023, Burrage was awarded the Blavatnik Award for Young Scientists in the UK for her work on dark energy. In 2025, she was awarded the Royal Society's Rosalind Franklin Prize, giving her award lecture on 21 October 2025.
