= Meanings of minor-planet names: 24001–25000 =

As minor planet discoveries are confirmed, they are given a permanent number by the IAU's Minor Planet Center (MPC), and the discoverers can then submit names for them, following the IAU's naming conventions. The list below concerns those minor planets in the specified number-range that have received names, and explains the meanings of those names.

Official naming citations of newly named small Solar System bodies are approved and published in a bulletin by IAU's Working Group for Small Bodies Nomenclature (WGSBN). Before May 2021, citations were published in MPC's Minor Planet Circulars for many decades. Recent citations can also be found on the JPL Small-Body Database (SBDB). Until his death in 2016, German astronomer Lutz D. Schmadel compiled these citations into the Dictionary of Minor Planet Names (DMP) and regularly updated the collection.

Based on Paul Herget's The Names of the Minor Planets, Schmadel also researched the unclear origin of numerous asteroids, most of which had been named prior to World War II. This article incorporates text from this source, which is in the public domain: SBDB New namings may only be added to this list below after official publication as the preannouncement of names is condemned. The WGSBN publishes a comprehensive guideline for the naming rules of non-cometary small Solar System bodies.

== 24001–24100 ==
Named minor planet	Provisional	This minor planet was named for...	Ref; Catalog
24005 Eddieozawa	1999 RB_{59}	Eddie Ozawa, American mentor of a 2007 Discovery Channel Young Scientist Challenge (DCYSC) finalist	JPL · 24005
24010 Stovall	1999 RR_{104}	Laraine Stovall, American mentor of a 2007 Discovery Channel Young Scientist Challenge (DCYSC) finalist	JPL · 24010
24015 Pascalepinner	1999 RK_{123}	Pascale Pinner, American mentor of a 2007 Discovery Channel Young Scientist Challenge (DCYSC) finalist	JPL · 24015
24019 Jeremygasper	1999 RX_{137}	Jeremy Gasper, American mentor of a 2007 Discovery Channel Young Scientist Challenge (DCYSC) finalist	JPL · 24019
24021 Yocum	1999 RT_{143}	Ivan Yocum, American mentor of a 2007 Discovery Channel Young Scientist Challenge (DCYSC) finalist	JPL · 24021
24024 Lynnejohnson	1999 RY_{159}	Lynne Johnson, American mentor of a 2007 Discovery Channel Young Scientist Challenge (DCYSC) finalist	JPL · 24024
24025 Kimwallin	1999 RV_{164}	Kim Wallin, American mentor of a 2007 Discovery Channel Young Scientist Challenge (DCYSC) finalist	JPL · 24025
24026 Pusateri	1999 RN_{175}	Lynne Pusateri, American mentor of a 2007 Discovery Channel Young Scientist Challenge (DCYSC) finalist	JPL · 24026
24027 Downs	1999 RP_{176}	Karen Downs, American mentor of a 2007 Discovery Channel Young Scientist Challenge (DCYSC) finalist	JPL · 24027
24028 Veronicaduys	1999 RP_{182}	Veronica Duys, American mentor of a 2007 Discovery Channel Young Scientist Challenge (DCYSC) finalist	JPL · 24028
24032 Aimeemcarthy	1999 RO_{212}	Aimee McCarthy, American mentor of a 2007 Discovery Channel Young Scientist Challenge (DCYSC) finalist	JPL · 24032
24044 Caballo	1999 SL_{17}	Cindy Caballo, American mentor of a 2007 Discovery Channel Young Scientist Challenge (DCYSC) finalist	JPL · 24044
24045 Unruh	1999 ST_{18}	Amy Unruh, American mentor of a 2007 Discovery Channel Young Scientist Challenge (DCYSC) finalist	JPL · 24045
24046 Malovany	1999 TX_{3}	Joseph Malovany, American tenor soloist, cantor of New York's Fifth Avenue Synagogue, and professor of Liturgical Music at Yeshiva University	JPL · 24046
24047 Latorredelsole	1999 TD_{6}	La Torre del Sole is an astronomical park in Brembate di Sopra, in the province of Bergamo, Italy, located in an old restored water storage facility.	IAU · 24047
24048 Pedroduque	1999 TL_{11}	Pedro Duque, Spanish astronaut	JPL · 24048
24051 Hadinger	1999 TW_{28}	Melisa Hadinger, American mentor of a 2007 Discovery Channel Young Scientist Challenge (DCYSC) finalist	JPL · 24051
24052 Nguyen	1999 TC_{33}	Thuy-Anh Nguyen, American mentor of a 2007 Discovery Channel Young Scientist Challenge (DCYSC) finalist	JPL · 24052
24053 Shinichiro	1999 TS_{36}	Shin-ichiro Okumura (born 1965), an astronomer at the Bisei Spacegaurd Center of Japan.	JPL · 24053
24059 Halverson	1999 TE_{94}	Carl Halverson, American mentor of a 2007 Discovery Channel Young Scientist Challenge (DCYSC) finalist	JPL · 24059
24060 Schimenti	1999 TQ_{100}	Jamie Schimenti, American mentor of a 2007 Discovery Channel Young Scientist Challenge (DCYSC) finalist	JPL · 24060
24062 Hardister	1999 TF_{112}	Scott Hardister, American mentor of a 2007 Discovery Channel Young Scientist Challenge (DCYSC) finalist	JPL · 24062
24063 Nanwoodward	1999 TV_{116}	Nancy Woodward, American mentor of a 2007 Discovery Channel Young Scientist Challenge (DCYSC) finalist	JPL · 24063
24065 Barbfriedman	1999 TW_{120}	Barbara Friedman, American mentor of a 2007 Discovery Channel Young Scientist Challenge (DCYSC) finalist	JPL · 24065
24066 Eriksorensen	1999 TE_{123}	Erik Sorensen, American mentor of a 2007 Discovery Channel Young Scientist Challenge (DCYSC) finalist	JPL · 24066
24068 Simonsen	1999 TR_{156}	Larry Simonsen Jr., American mentor of a 2007 Discovery Channel Young Scientist Challenge (DCYSC) finalist	JPL · 24068
24069 Barbarapener	1999 TY_{172}	Barbara Pener, American mentor of a 2007 Discovery Channel Young Scientist Challenge (DCYSC) finalist	JPL · 24069
24070 Toniwest	1999 TH_{173}	Toni West, American mentor of a 2007 Discovery Channel Young Scientist Challenge (DCYSC) finalist	JPL · 24070
24074 Thomasjohnson	1999 TE_{198}	Thomas Johnson, American mentor of a 2007 Discovery Channel Young Scientist Challenge (DCYSC) finalist	JPL · 24074
24084 Teresaswiger	1999 TG_{289}	Teresa Swiger, American mentor of a 2007 Discovery Channel Young Scientist Challenge (DCYSC) finalist	JPL · 24084
24087 Ciambetti	1999 UT_{3}	Since 2005 Roberto Ciambetti (born 1946) has been promoting a new law against light pollution in the Veneto region. This law was renewed during the International Year of Astronomy, and astronomical observatories will now be more protected	JPL · 24087
24090 Grindavík	1999 UY_{8}	Grindavík, town on the Reykjanes Peninsula in Iceland.	IAU · 24090
24093 Tomoyamaguchi	1999 UM_{38}	Tomohiro Yamaguchi (born 1984) is a trajectory analyst who has assisted in the construction of a cluster system for asteroid orbit computation in Sagamihara city. He studies orbital dynamics for both natural bodies and for interplanetary spacecraft such as Hayabusa and IKAROS.	JPL · 24093

== 24101–24200 ==
back to top

Named minor planet	Provisional	This minor planet was named for...	Ref; Catalog
24101 Cassini	1999 VA_{9}	Giovanni Domenico Cassini (a.k.a. Jean-Dominique Cassini), 17th-century Italian-born French astronomer	JPL · 24101
24102 Jacquescassini	1999 VD_{9}	Jacques Cassini, French astronomer, son of Jean-Dominique Cassini	JPL · 24102
24103 Dethury	1999 VS_{9}	César-François Cassini de Thury, French astronomer and cartographer, son of Jacques Cassini	JPL · 24103
24104 Vinissac	1999 VZ_{9}	Reversed spelling of "Cassini IV", i.e. Jean-Dominique Cassini, son of César-François	JPL · 24104
24105 Broughton	1999 VE_{10}	John Broughton, Australian amateur astronomer	JPL · 24105
24118 Babazadeh	1999 VX_{28}	Evan Joseph Babazadeh, American finalist in the 2008 Intel Science Talent Search (ISTS) ‡	JPL · 24118
24119 Katherinrose	1999 VB_{32}	Katherine Rose Banks, American finalist in the 2008 Intel Science Talent Search (ISTS) ‡	JPL · 24119
24120 Jeremyblum	1999 VR_{33}	Jeremy Evan Blum, American finalist in the 2008 Intel Science Talent Search (ISTS) ‡	JPL · 24120
24121 Achandran	1999 VV_{33}	Ashok Chandran, American finalist in the 2008 Intel Science Talent Search (ISTS)‡	JPL · 24121
24123 Timothychang	1999 VU_{35}	Timothy Zuchi Chang, American finalist in the 2008 Intel Science Talent Search (ISTS) ‡	JPL · 24123
24124 Dozier	1999 VH_{36}	Benjamin Edward Dozier, American finalist in the 2008 Intel Science Talent Search (ISTS) ‡	JPL · 24124
24125 Sapphozoe	1999 VS_{36}	Sappho Zoe Gilbert, American finalist in the 2008 Intel Science Talent Search (ISTS) ‡	JPL · 24125
24126 Gudjonson	1999 VC_{49}	Herman Gudjonson, American finalist in the 2008 Intel Science Talent Search (ISTS) ‡	JPL · 24126
24128 Hipsman	1999 VU_{53}	Nathaniel Edward Hipsman, American finalist in the 2008 Intel Science Talent Search (ISTS) ‡	JPL · 24128
24129 Oliviahu	1999 VJ_{62}	Olivia Hu, American finalist in the 2008 Intel Science Talent Search (ISTS) ‡	JPL · 24129
24130 Alexhuang	1999 VW_{63}	Alexander Chi-Jan Huang, American finalist in the 2008 Intel Science Talent Search (ISTS) ‡	JPL · 24130
24131 Jonathuggins	1999 VG_{65}	Jonathan Hunter Huggins, American finalist in the 2008 Intel Science Talent Search (ISTS) ‡	JPL · 24131
24133 Chunkaikao	1999 VW_{67}	Chun-Kai Kao, American finalist in the 2008 Intel Science Talent Search (ISTS) ‡	JPL · 24133
24134 Cliffordkim	1999 VD_{70}	Clifford Byungho Kim, American finalist in the 2008 Intel Science Talent Search (ISTS) ‡	JPL · 24134
24135 Lisann	1999 VA_{71}	Lauren Rose Lisann, American finalist in the 2008 Intel Science Talent Search (ISTS) ‡	JPL · 24135
24137 Torre del Lago	1999 VP_{72}	Torre del Lago Puccini is a charming small town in Tuscany, Italy.	IAU · 24137
24138 Benjaminlu	1999 VB_{81}	Benjamin Brice Lu, American finalist in the 2008 Intel Science Talent Search (ISTS) ‡	JPL · 24138
24139 Brianmcarthy	1999 VE_{89}	Brian Davis McCarthy, American finalist in the 2008 Intel Science Talent Search (ISTS) ‡	JPL · 24139
24140 Evanmirts	1999 VQ_{89}	Evan Neal Mirts, American finalist in the 2008 Intel Science Talent Search (ISTS) ‡	JPL · 24140
24144 Philipmocz	1999 VU_{137}	Philip Mocz, American finalist in the 2008 Intel Science Talent Search (ISTS) ‡	JPL · 24144
24146 Benjamueller	1999 VY_{158}	Benjamin Julius Mueller, American finalist in the 2008 Intel Science Talent Search (ISTS) ‡	JPL · 24146
24147 Stefanmuller	1999 VH_{162}	Stefan Klein Muller, American finalist in the 2008 Intel Science Talent Search (ISTS) ‡	JPL · 24147
24148 Mychajliw	1999 VM_{169}	Alexis Marie Mychajliw, American finalist in the 2008 Intel Science Talent Search (ISTS) ‡	JPL · 24148
24149 Raghavan	1999 VL_{173}	Avanthi Raghavan, American finalist in the 2008 Intel Science Talent Search (ISTS) ‡	JPL · 24149
24152 Ramasesh	1999 VR_{185}	Vinay Venkatesh Ramasesh, American finalist in the 2008 Intel Science Talent Search (ISTS) ‡	JPL · 24152
24153 Davidalex	1999 VE_{188}	David Alex Rosengarten, American finalist in the 2008 Intel Science Talent Search (ISTS) ‡	JPL · 24153
24154 Ayonsen	1999 VP_{188}	Ayon Sen, American finalist in the 2008 Intel Science Talent Search (ISTS) ‡	JPL · 24154
24155 Serganov	1999 VX_{188}	Artem Serganov, American finalist in the 2008 Intel Science Talent Search (ISTS) ‡	JPL · 24155
24156 Hamsasridhar	1999 VZ_{188}	Hamsa Sridhar, American finalist in the 2008 Intel Science Talent Search (ISTS) ‡	JPL · 24156
24157 Toshiyanagisawa	1999 VN_{192}	Toshifumi Yanagisawa (born 1971), a senior researcher at JAXA.	JPL · 24157
24158 Kokubo	1999 VV_{192}	Kokubo Eiichiro (born 1968), an astronomer at the National Astronomical Observatory of Japan.	JPL · 24158
24159 Shigetakahashi	1999 VY_{192}	Shigeru Takahashi (born 1970), a Japanese solar system researcher.	JPL · 24159
24162 Askaci	1999 WD	Astronomical Society of Kansas City	JPL · 24162
24168 Hexlein	1999 WH_{9}	German for "little witch", the childhood nickname of Renate Kühnen, friend of Rainer Hesken, co-discoverer †	MPC · 24168
24173 SLAS	1999 XS_{1}	Saint Louis Astronomical Society	JPL · 24173
24186 Shivanisud	1999 XL_{18}	Shivani Sud, American finalist in the 2008 Intel Science Talent Search (ISTS) ‡	JPL · 24186
24188 Matthewage	1999 XS_{24}	Matthew Michael Wage, American finalist in the 2008 Intel Science Talent Search (ISTS) ‡	JPL · 24188
24189 Lewasserman	1999 XR_{25}	Louis Eric Wasserman, American finalist in the 2008 Intel Science Talent Search (ISTS) ‡	JPL · 24189
24190 Xiaoyunyin	1999 XT_{28}	Xiaoyun Yin, American finalist in the 2008 Intel Science Talent Search (ISTS) ‡	JPL · 24190
24191 Qiaochuyuan	1999 XK_{30}	Qiaochu Yuan, American finalist in the 2008 Intel Science Talent Search (ISTS) ‡	JPL · 24191
24194 Paľuš	1999 XU_{35}	Pavel Paľuš (born 1936), Slovak astronomer, one of the founders of the Modra Observatory. He has researched solar prominence and lectured at Comenius University in Bratislava (IAU).	JPL · 24194
24198 Xiaomengzeng	1999 XB_{39}	Xiaomeng Zeng, American finalist in the 2008 Intel Science Talent Search (ISTS) ‡	JPL · 24198
24199 Tsarevsky	1999 XD_{39}	Irena Tsarevsky, American mentor of a 2008 Intel Science Talent Search (ISTS) finalist ‡	JPL · 24199
24200 Peterbrooks	1999 XB_{40}	Peter Brooks, American mentor of a 2008 Intel Science Talent Search (ISTS) finalist ‡	JPL · 24200

== 24201–24300 ==
back to top

Named minor planet	Provisional	This minor planet was named for...	Ref; Catalog
24201 Davidkeith	1999 XL_{40}	David Keith, American mentor of a 2008 Intel Science Talent Search (ISTS) finalist ‡	JPL · 24201
24204 Trinkle	1999 XZ_{46}	Maria Trinkle, American mentor of a 2008 Intel Science Talent Search (ISTS) finalist ‡	JPL · 24204
24206 Mariealoia	1999 XH_{48}	Marie Aloia, American mentor of a 2008 Intel Science Talent Search (ISTS) finalist ‡	JPL · 24206
24208 Stelguerrero	1999 XC_{51}	Stella Guerrero, American mentor of a 2008 Intel Science Talent Search (ISTS) finalist ‡	JPL · 24208
24210 Handsberry	1999 XM_{52}	Joy Handsberry, American mentor of a 2008 Intel Science Talent Search (ISTS) finalist ‡	JPL · 24210
24211 Barbarawood	1999 XD_{53}	Barbara Wood, American mentor of a 2008 Intel Science Talent Search (ISTS) finalist ‡	JPL · 24211
24214 Jonchristo	1999 XC_{67}	Jon Christopher, American mentor of a 2008 Intel Science Talent Search (ISTS) finalist ‡	JPL · 24214
24215 Jongastel	1999 XN_{68}	Jonathan Gastel, American mentor of a 2008 Intel Science Talent Search (ISTS) finalist ‡	JPL · 24215
24217 Paulroeder	1999 XO_{70}	Paul Roeder, American mentor of a 2008 Intel Science Talent Search (ISTS) finalist ‡	JPL · 24217
24218 Linfrederick	1999 XV_{70}	Linda Frederick, American mentor of a 2008 Intel Science Talent Search (ISTS) finalist ‡	JPL · 24218
24219 Chrisodom	1999 XW_{71}	Christopher Odom, American mentor of a 2008 Intel Science Talent Search (ISTS) finalist ‡	JPL · 24219
24224 Matthewdavis	1999 XU_{76}	Matthew Davis, American mentor of a 2008 Intel Science Talent Search (ISTS) finalist ‡	JPL · 24224
24226 Sekhsaria	1999 XM_{81}	Anupama Sekhsaria, American mentor of a 2008 Intel Science Talent Search (ISTS) finalist ‡	JPL · 24226
24232 Lanthrum	1999 XA_{92}	Drew Lanthrum, American mentor of a 2008 Intel Science Talent Search (ISTS) finalist ‡	JPL · 24232
24236 Danielberger	1999 XS_{96}	Daniel Berger, American mentor of a 2008 Intel Science Talent Search (ISTS) finalist ‡	JPL · 24236
24238 Adkerson	1999 XQ_{97}	Timothy Adkerson, American mentor of a 2008 Intel Science Talent Search (ISTS) finalist ‡	JPL · 24238
24239 Paulinehiga	1999 XX_{97}	Pauline Higa, American mentor of a 2008 Intel Science Talent Search (ISTS) finalist ‡	JPL · 24239
24240 Tinagal	1999 XV_{99}	Tina Gallagher, American mentor of a 2008 Intel Science Talent Search (ISTS) finalist ‡	JPL · 24240
24245 Ezratty	1999 XB_{102}	Marla Ezratty, American mentor of a 2008 Intel Science Talent Search (ISTS) finalist ‡	JPL · 24245
24249 Bobbiolson	1999 XC_{107}	Roberta Rae ("Bobbi") Olson, née Russell, American wife of the University of Arizona basketball coach Lute Olson, and fund-raiser for the Arizona Arthritis Center and the Arizona Cancer Center	JPL · 24249
24250 Luteolson	1999 XS_{109}	Robert Luther ("Lute") Olson, American collegiate Hall of Fame head basketball coach of the University of Arizona	JPL · 24250
24259 Chriswalker	1999 XR_{127}	Christopher W. Walker, American astronomer, who helped create the Global Network of Astronomical Telescopes photometric data reduction pipeline	JPL · 24259
24260 Kriváň	1999 XW_{127}	Kriváň, a symbolic mountain in the High Tatras, Slovakia †	MPC · 24260
24261 Judilegault	1999 XA_{130}	Judith Legault, American mentor of a 2008 Intel Science Talent Search (ISTS) finalist ‡	JPL · 24261
24265 Banthonytwarog	1999 XU_{143}	Barbara J. Anthony-Twarog, American astronomer	JPL · 24265
24268 Charconley	1999 XN_{156}	Charles Conley, American mentor of a 2008 Intel Science Talent Search (ISTS) finalist ‡	JPL · 24268
24269 Kittappa	1999 XL_{157}	Vasantha Kittappa, American mentor of a 2008 Intel Science Talent Search (ISTS) finalist ‡	JPL · 24269
24270 Dougskinner	1999 XD_{158}	Doug Skinner, American mentor of a 2008 Intel Science Talent Search (ISTS) finalist ‡	JPL · 24270
24274 Alliswheeler	1999 XN_{167}	Allison Wheeler, American mentor of a 2008 Intel Science Talent Search (ISTS) finalist ‡	JPL · 24274
24277 Schoch	1999 XQ_{169}	Jane Schoch, American mentor of a 2008 Intel Science Talent Search (ISTS) finalist ‡	JPL · 24277
24278 Davidgreen	1999 XZ_{170}	David Green, American mentor of a 2008 Intel Science Talent Search (ISTS) finalist ‡	JPL · 24278
24280 Rohenderson	1999 XE_{172}	Robin Henderson, American mentor of a 2008 Intel Science Talent Search (ISTS) finalist ‡	JPL · 24280
24289 Anthonypalma	1999 XO_{190}	Anthony Palma, American mentor of a 2008 Intel Science Talent Search (ISTS) finalist ‡	JPL · 24289
24292 Susanragan	1999 XV_{191}	Susan Ragan, American mentor of a 2008 Intel Science Talent Search (ISTS) finalist ‡	JPL · 24292
24296 Marychristie	1999 XW_{212}	Mary Christie, American mentor of a 2008 Intel Science Talent Search (ISTS) finalist ‡	JPL · 24296
24297 Jonbach	1999 XZ_{213}	Jon Bach, American mentor of a 2008 Intel Science Talent Search (ISTS) finalist ‡	JPL · 24297

== 24301–24400 ==
back to top

Named minor planet	Provisional	This minor planet was named for...	Ref; Catalog
24301 Gural	1999 XZ_{233}	Peter S. Gural (born 1955), a scientist who has applied advanced image processing techniques to both asteroid and meteor detection in ground and space-based systems. JPL	MPC · 24301
24303 Michaelrice	1999 YY	Michael (Mike) L. Rice, American amateur astronomer, co-founder of the New Mexico Skies Observatory near Cloudcroft with his wife Lynn	JPL · 24303
24304 Lynnrice	1999 YZ	Eileen Lynn Rice, American amateur astronomer, co-founder of the New Mexico Skies Observatory near Cloudcroft with her husband Michael	JPL · 24304
24305 Darrellparnell	1999 YG_{4}	Darrell Parnell, American astronomer	JPL · 24305
24308 Cowenco	1999 YC_{9}	Courtney, Wendy and Cody, offspring of the first discoverer	JPL · 24308
24316 Anncooper	2000 AQ_{11}	Ann Simone Cooper, American 2008 Intel International Science and Engineering Fair (ISEF) winner, for her animal sciences project.	JPL · 24316
24317 Pukarhamal	2000 AL_{12}	Pukar Hamal, American 2008 Intel International Science and Engineering Fair (ISEF) winner, for his animal sciences project.	JPL · 24317
24318 Vivianlee	2000 AE_{14}	Vivian Alice Lee, American 2008 Intel International Science and Engineering Fair, for her behavioral and social sciences project. (ISEF) winner	JPL · 24318
24325 Kaleighanne	2000 AB_{52}	Kaleigh Anne Eichel, American 2008 Intel International Science and Engineering Fair (ISEF) winner for her behavioral and social sciences project and Seaborg Stockholm International Youth Science Seminar (SIYSS) selectee	JPL · 24325
24328 Thomasburr	2000 AF_{54}	Thomas McLean Burr, American 2008 Intel International Science and Engineering Fair (ISEF) winner, for his behavioral and social sciences project.	JPL · 24328
24331 Alyshaowen	2000 AL_{68}	Alysha Harper Owen, American 2008 Intel International Science and Engineering Fair (ISEF) winner, for her behavioral and social sciences project.	JPL · 24331
24332 Shaunalinn	2000 AK_{69}	Shauna Theresa Linn, American 2008 Intel International Science and Engineering Fair (ISEF) winner, for her behavioral and social sciences project.	JPL · 24332
24333 Petermassey	2000 AA_{70}	Peter Hans Massey, American 2008 Intel International Science and Engineering Fair (ISEF) winner, for his behavioral and social sciences team project.	JPL · 24333
24334 Conard	2000 AL_{71}	Russell B. Conard, American 2008 Intel International Science and Engineering Fair (ISEF) winner, for his biochemistry project.	JPL · 24334
24337 Johannessen	2000 AF_{77}	Liv Helena Johannessen, American 2008 Intel International Science and Engineering Fair (ISEF) winner, for her biochemistry project.	JPL · 24337
24344 Brianbarnett	2000 AB_{99}	Brian Gray Barnett, American 2008 Intel International Science and Engineering Fair (ISEF) winner, for his biochemistry team project.	JPL · 24344
24345 Llaverias	2000 AU_{99}	Priscila Elena Llaverias, American 2008 Intel International Science and Engineering Fair (ISEF) winner, for her biochemistry team project.	JPL · 24345
24346 Lehienphan	2000 AK_{100}	Le Hien Thi Phan, American 2008 Intel International Science and Engineering Fair (ISEF) winner, for her biochemistry team project.	JPL · 24346
24347 Arthurkuan	2000 AF_{102}	Arthur Kuan, American 2008 Intel International Science and Engineering Fair (ISEF) winner, for his cellular and molecular biology project.	JPL · 24347
24351 Fionawood	2000 AD_{104}	Fiona Winifred Wood, American 2008 Intel International Science and Engineering Fair (ISEF) winner, for her cellular and molecular biology project.	JPL · 24351
24352 Kapilrama	2000 AE_{104}	Kapil Vishveshwar Ramachandran, American 2008 Intel International Science and Engineering Fair (ISEF) winner, for his cellular and molecular biology project.	JPL · 24352
24353 Patrickhsu	2000 AG_{104}	Patrick David Hsu, American 2008 Intel International Science and Engineering Fair (ISEF) winner, for his cellular and molecular biology project.	JPL · 24353
24354 Caz	2000 AA_{105}	Christopher Allen Zimmerman, American 2008 Intel International Science and Engineering Fair (ISEF) winner, for his chemistry project.	JPL · 24354
24369 Evanichols	2000 AE_{132}	Eva Megan Nichols, American 2008 Intel International Science and Engineering Fair (ISEF) winner, for her chemistry team project.	JPL · 24369
24370 Marywang	2000 AX_{139}	Mary Xue Wang, American 2008 Intel International Science and Engineering Fair (ISEF) winner, for her chemistry team project.	JPL · 24370
24372 Timobauman	2000 AG_{140}	Timothy Bauman, American 2008 Intel International Science and Engineering Fair (ISEF) winner, for his computer science project.	JPL · 24372
24376 Ramesh	2000 AB_{152}	Vinayak Ramesh, American 2008 Intel International Science and Engineering Fair (ISEF) winner, for his computer science project.	JPL · 24376
24378 Katelyngibbs	2000 AZ_{154}	Katelyn Elizabeth Gibbs, American 2008 Intel International Science and Engineering Fair (ISEF) winner, for her earth and planetary science project.	JPL · 24378
24380 Dorippe	2000 AA_{160}	Dorippe was ransomed by Anius from pirates who had kidnapped her. Dorippe had three daughters with Anius ̶ Elais, Oeno, and Spermo.	IAU · 24380
24385 Katcagen	2000 AM_{172}	Katherine Thompson Cagen, American 2008 Intel International Science and Engineering Fair (ISEF) winner, for her earth and planetary science project.	JPL · 24385
24386 McLindon	2000 AV_{172}	Bonnie Joyce McLindon, American 2008 Intel International Science and Engineering Fair (ISEF) winner, for her earth and planetary science project.	JPL · 24386
24387 Trettel	2000 AB_{174}	Stephen Jerome Trettel, American 2008 Intel International Science and Engineering Fair (ISEF) winner, for his electrical and mechanical engineering project.	JPL · 24387
24397 Parkerowan	2000 AT_{186}	Parker Owan, American 2008 Intel International Science and Engineering Fair (ISEF) winner, for his electrical and mechanical engineering project.	JPL · 24397

== 24401–24500 ==
back to top

Named minor planet	Provisional	This minor planet was named for...	Ref; Catalog
24409 Caninquinn	2000 AH_{235}	Canin Quinn Christell, American 2008 Intel International Science and Engineering Fair (ISEF) winner, for his electrical and mechanical engineering project.	JPL · 24409
24410 Juliewalker	2000 AZ_{236}	Julie Emily Walker, American 2008 Intel International Science and Engineering Fair (ISEF) winner, for her electrical and mechanical engineering project.	JPL · 24410
24411 Janches	2000 AU_{240}	Diego Janches (born 1967), a space weather scientist at the Goddard Space Flight Center.	JPL · 24411
24412 Ericpalmer	2000 AM_{243}	Eric E. Palmer (born 1968), a research scientist at the Planetary Science Institute in Tucson.	JPL · 24412
24413 Britneyschmidt	2000 AN_{243}	Britney Elyce Schmidt (born 1982), an assistant professor in the department of Earth and Atmospheric Sciences at Georgia Tech.	JPL · 24413
24414 Anzhenhosp	2000 AJ_{246}	Beijing Anzhen Hospital, in China	IAU · 24414
24420 Thasos	2000 BU_{22}	Thasos was one of three sons of Anius. He was devoured by a pack of dogs on his home island of Delos.	IAU · 24420
24421 Djorgovski	2000 BQ_{33}	Stanislav George Djorgovski (born 1956) is a professor of astronomy at the California Institute of Technology. He has performed fundamental research in many topics, including high-z galaxies, globular clusters, quasars and galactic evolution. He has pioneered the use of advanced computing techniques for astronomical problems	JPL · 24421
24422 Helentressa	2000 CF_{3}	Helen Tressa D´Couto, American 2008 Intel International Science and Engineering Fair (ISEF) winner, for her environmental management project.	JPL · 24422
24426 Belova	2000 CR_{12}	Elena Belova (born 1947) is a retired fencer from Belarus who became the first woman to win four gold medals during five Olympics from 1968 through 1980. In 2007 she was awarded the Pierre de Coubertin medal by the International Olympic Committee.	IAU · 24426
24432 Elizamcnitt	2000 CT_{48}	Eliza Helen McNitt, American 2008 Intel International Science and Engineering Fair (ISEF) winner, for her environmental management project.	JPL · 24432
24434 Josephhoscheidt	2000 CY_{112}	Joseph Hoscheidt, a member of the Mountain Operations team for Steward Observatory at the University of Arizona.	JPL · 24434
24438 Michaeloy	2000 EV_{94}	Michael Jeffrey Loy, American 2008 Intel International Science and Engineering Fair (ISEF) winner, for his materials and bioengineering project.	JPL · 24438
24439 Yanney	2000 EM_{144}	Michael (born 1933) and Gail (born 1936) Yanney, American philanthropists and community leaders, based in Omaha, Nebraska.	JPL · 24439
24441 Jopek	2000 FM_{29}	Tadeusz J. Jopek (born 1951), a professor at Adam Mickiewicz University, Poznaņ, Poland. JPL	MPC · 24441
24450 Victorchang	2000 QC_{69}	Victor Peter Chang, Chinese-Australian heart surgeon	JPL · 24450
24451 Molion	2000 QS_{104}	Molion, squire to Thymbraeus, killed by Odysseus.	JPL · 24451
24455 Kaňuchová	2000 QF_{222}	Zuzana Kanuchová (born 1979), a researcher at the Astronomical Institute of the Slovak Academy of Sciences.	JPL · 24455
24464 Williamkalb	2000 SX_{124}	William B. Kalb, American 2008 Intel International Science and Engineering Fair (ISEF) winner, for his materials and bioengineering project.	JPL · 24464
24474 Ananthram	2000 VE_{2}	Ananth Ram, American 2008 Intel International Science and Engineering Fair (ISEF) winner, for his materials and bioengineering project.	JPL · 24474
24480 Glavin	2000 WA_{191}	Daniel P. Glavin (born 1974), an astrobiologist at the Goddard Space Flight Center.	JPL · 24480
24484 Chester	2000 YV_{49}	Shai Matthew Chester, American 2008 Intel International Science and Engineering Fair (ISEF) winner, for his materials and bioengineering team project.	JPL · 24484
24488 Eliebochner	2000 YY_{111}	Elie Joshua Bochner, American 2008 Intel International Science and Engineering Fair (ISEF) winner, for his materials and bioengineering team project.	JPL · 24488
24492 Nathanmonroe	2000 YQ_{131}	Nathan McKay Monroe, American 2008 Intel International Science and Engineering Fair (ISEF) winner, for his energy and transportation project.	JPL · 24492
24493 McCommon	2000 YT_{131}	Steven Richard McCommon, American 2008 Intel International Science and Engineering Fair (ISEF) winner, for his environmental sciences project.	JPL · 24493
24494 Megmoulding	2000 YH_{132}	Megan Moulding, American 2008 Intel International Science and Engineering Fair (ISEF) winner, for her environmental sciences project.	JPL · 24494
24495 Degroff	2001 AV_{1}	Bill DeGroff (born 1956), Telescope Facilities Manager at Lowell Observatory, was instrumental in realizing the exceptional performance of the Lowell Discovery Telescope (LDT). Prior to his present operational position, he served as Project Manager, and before that Project Engineer during LDT development.	JPL · 24495

== 24501–24600 ==
back to top

Named minor planet	Provisional	This minor planet was named for...	Ref; Catalog
24503 Kero	2001 AJ_{42}	Johan Kero (born 1978), a scientist at the Swedish Institute of Space Physics	JPL · 24503
24509 Joycechai	2001 BT_{27}	Joyce Sophia Chai, a 2008 Intel International Science and Engineering Fair (ISEF) winner for her environmental sciences project.	JPL · 24509
24517 Omattage	2001 BN_{71}	Natalie Saranga Omattage, a 2008 Intel International Science and Engineering Fair (ISEF) winner for her environmental sciences project and recipient of an Intel Foundation Young Scientist Award	JPL · 24517
24520 Abramson	2001 CW_{1}	Ronit Batya Roth Abramson, American 2008 Intel International Science and Engineering Fair (ISEF) winner, for her environmental sciences project.	JPL · 24520
24523 Sanaraoof	2001 CV_{3}	Sana Raoof, American 2008 Intel International Science and Engineering Fair (ISEF) winner for her mathematical sciences project and recipient of an Intel Foundation Young Scientist Award	JPL · 24523
24524 Kevinhawkins	2001 CY_{3}	Kevin Kyle Hawkins, American 2008 Intel International Science and Engineering Fair (ISEF) winner for his mathematical sciences project.	JPL · 24524
24526 Desai	2001 CA_{5}	Kshitij A. Desai, American 2008 Intel International Science and Engineering Fair (ISEF) winner for his medicine and health sciences project.	JPL · 24526
24529 Urbach	2001 CW_{17}	Jourdan Brandt Urbach, American 2008 Intel International Science and Engineering Fair (ISEF) winner for his medicine and health sciences project.	JPL · 24529
24532 Csabakiss	2001 CY_{21}	Csaba Kiss (born 1973), an astronomer at the Konkoly Observatory, Budapest, Hungary.	JPL · 24532
24533 Kokhirova	2001 CR_{27}	Gulchekhra I. Kokhirova (born 1962), a scientist at the Institute of Astrophysics of the Academy of Sciences of the Republic of Tajikistan.	JPL · 24533
24535 Neslušan	2001 CA_{28}	Lubos Neslušan (born 1960), a meteor astronomer at the Astronomical Institute of the Slovak Academy of Sciences.	JPL · 24535
24538 Charliexie	2001 DM_{5}	Charlie L. Xie, American 2008 Intel International Science and Engineering Fair (ISEF) winner for his medicine and health sciences project.	JPL · 24538
24541 Hangzou	2001 DO_{16}	Hang Richard Zou, American 2008 Intel International Science and Engineering Fair (ISEF) winner for his medicine and health sciences project.	JPL · 24541
24546 Darnell	2001 DE_{35}	Alicia Marie Darnell, American 2008 Intel International Science and Engineering Fair (ISEF) winner for her medicine and health sciences project.	JPL · 24546
24547 Stauber	2001 DV_{36}	Zachary Jason Stauber, American 2008 Intel International Science and Engineering Fair (ISEF) winner for his medicine and health sciences project.	JPL · 24547
24548 Katieeverett	2001 DW_{42}	Katie Elizabeth Everett, American 2008 Intel International Science and Engineering Fair (ISEF) winner for her medicine and health sciences project.	JPL · 24548
24549 Jaredgoodman	2001 DB_{69}	Jared Vega Goodman, American 2008 Intel International Science and Engineering Fair (ISEF) winner for his medicine and health sciences team project and recipient of a European Union Contest for Young Scientists Award	JPL · 24549
24587 Kapaneus	4613 T-2	Capaneus, in Greek mythology, son of Hipponous and father of Sthenelus, and one of the Seven against Thebes	JPL · 24587

== 24601–24700 ==
back to top

Named minor planet	Provisional	This minor planet was named for...	Ref; Catalog
24601 Valjean	1971 UW	Jean Valjean, the central character in Victor Hugo's Les Misérables. When he was imprisoned in a labor camp, he was known by the serial number 24601.	JPL · 24601
24602 Mozzhorin	1972 TE	Yurij Aleksandrovich Mozzhorin (1920–1998) was one of the organizers and leaders in the field of Soviet space-rocket engineering. He was the founder of the Space Mission Control Center and the director of the Central Research Institute of Machine Building (1961–1990)	JPL · 24602
24603 Mekistheus	1973 SQ	Mecisteus, Greek mythological character, son of Talaus and father of Euryalus, and according to some accounts one of the Seven against Thebes	JPL · 24603
24604 Vasilermakov	1973 SP_{4}	Ermakov Vasilij Timofeevich (1927–2007) was a priest, a historian of Christianity and a social activist.	JPL · 24604
24605 Tsykalyuk	1975 VZ_{8}	Sergej Alekseevich Tsykalyuk, Russian economist	JPL · 24605
24607 Sevnatu	1977 PC_{1}	Sevastopol National Technical University, Ukraine	JPL · 24607
24608 Alexveselkov	1977 SL	Alexej Nikonovich Veselkov, Russian molecular physicist and biophysicist	JPL · 24608
24609 Evgenij	1978 RA_{2}	Evgenij Borisovich Aleksandrov, Russian physicist	JPL · 24609
24611 Svetochka	1978 SH_{3}	Svetlana Anatolʹevna Biryukova (born 1967), oldest daughter of the discoverer, graduated from Nizhnij Novgorod University with mathematics and law degrees. She is now a lawyer and is raising two children	JPL · 24611
24618 Johnduffey	1978 XD_{1}	John Duffey, influential American bluegrass musician, mandolin player and vocalist.	IAU · 24618
24619 Danielarsham	1979 DA	Daniel Arsham (b. 1980) is an American artist.	IAU · 24619
24626 Astrowizard	1980 TS_{3}	David V. ("Dave") Rodrigues, American astronomy teacher	JPL · 24626
24637 Olʹgusha	1981 RW_{4}	Olʹga Anatolʹevna Sazonova (born 1975), youngest daughter of the discoverer, graduated from Simferopol University with a mathematics degree. She lives in New York and is raising three children	JPL · 24637
24639 Mukhametdinov	1982 US_{6}	Vladimir Nagimovich Mukhametdinov (born 1946) worked for 46 years as a mechanical and power engineer, then as a teacher in the Technical Lyceum. As an enthusiastic amateur astronomer, he provides tireless assistance in upgrading the electronics of the telescopes at CrAO	JPL · 24639
24640 Omiwa	1982 XW_{1}	The Ōmiwa Shrine is one of the oldest Shinto shrines in Japan. It is located on Miwa-Yama, a mountain located in the southeast of the Yamato Basin, Miwa, Sakurai City, Nara prefecture.	JPL · 24640
24641 Enver	1983 RS_{4}	Enver Elimdarovich Abduraimov, Ukrainian (Crimean) physician	JPL · 24641
24643 MacCready	1984 SS	Paul MacCready, American engineer, who won the Kremer prize for the first human-powered flying machine	JPL · 24643
24645 Šegon	1985 PF	Damir Šegon (born 1962) has been a dedicated amateur meteor astronomer and mentor for more than three decades. He serves as Secretary of the Astronomical Society "Istra" Pula, Croatia and coordinates the Croatian Meteor Network's database of meteoroid orbital elements.	JPL · 24645
24646 Stober	1985 PG	Gunter Stober (born 1979), an expert in radar measurements of meteors and the atmosphere at the Leibniz-Institute of Atmospheric Physics in Kühlungsborn, Germany.	JPL · 24646
24647 Maksimachev	1985 QL_{5}	Astronomer Boris Alexeevich Maksimachev (born 1923) is deputy director of the Moscow planetarium. From 1954 to 1983 he delivered more than 8000 lectures. For 21 years he taught astronavigation to the cosmonauts. He is the author of hundreds of publications	JPL · 24647
24648 Evpatoria	1985 SG_{2}	Evpatoria, Crimea, Ukraine, on the occasion of its 2500th anniversary in 2003	JPL · 24648
24649 Balaklava	1985 SG_{3}	Balaklava, Crimea, Ukraine, now part of Sebastopol	JPL · 24649
24654 Fossett	1987 KL	Steve Fossett, American millionaire and adventurer	JPL · 24654
24658 Misch	1987 UX	Anthony Misch (born 1951) has made significant contributions to the history of astronomy through his creation and direction of the Lick Observatory Historical Collections. His career in astronomy spans over 30 years from the Mt. Wilson to Lick observatories.	JPL · 24658
24662 Gryll	1988 GS	Matyáš Gryll of Gryllov, Czech astronomer †	MPC · 24662
24663 Philae	1988 PV_{1}	Philae, an island (now submerged) in Lake Nasser, Egypt.	JPL · 24663
24665 Tolerantia	1988 RN_{3}	Latin for "tolerance", meaning nowadays tolerating different ideological and religious opinions and behaviours	JPL · 24665
24666 Miesvanrohe	1988 RZ_{3}	Ludwig Mies van der Rohe, German-American architect and designer	JPL · 24666
24671 Frankmartin	1989 AD_{7}	Frank Martin, Swiss composer	JPL · 24671
24673 Ohsugitadao	1989 SB_{1}	Tadao Ohsugi (b. 1950), a Japanese amateur astronomer.	IAU · 24673
24679 Van Rensbergen	1989 VR_{1}	Walter van Rensbergen (born 1941), a physicist at the VUB-University in Brussels.	JPL · 24679
24680 Alleven	1989 YE_{4}	"All [of the] even" digits	JPL · 24680
24681 Granados	1989 YE_{6}	Enrique Granados (1867–1916). a Spanish pianist and a composer of classical music in a uniquely Spanish style.	JPL · 24681
24695 Štyrský	1990 ST_{4}	Jindřich Štyrský (1899–1942) was a Czech Surrealist painter, graphic artist, photographer, poet and editor. The painter Toyen was his artistic partner. They became members of Devetsil and together with Nezval, Teige and Brouk founded The Group of Surrealists in Czechoslovakia in 1934	JPL · 24695
24697 Rastrelli	1990 SK_{28}	Carlo Bartolomeo Rastrelli and Francesco Bartolomeo Rastrelli, father and son, Italian sculptor and architect, respectively	JPL · 24697
24699 Schwekendiek	1990 TJ_{7}	Peter Schwekendiek, German astrophysicist	JPL · 24699

== 24701–24800 ==
back to top

Named minor planet	Provisional	This minor planet was named for...	Ref; Catalog
24701 Elyu-Ene	1990 VY_{5}	Elyu-Ene, "Large River", the Evenk name for the Lena River, one of the longest in the world (4400 km), flowing from the Baikal Mountains to the Laptev Sea	JPL · 24701
24709 Mitau	1991 PE_{6}	Ancient name of the Latvian city of Jelgava	JPL · 24709
24711 Chamisso	1991 PN_{17}	Adelbert von Chamisso, German-French poet and botanist	JPL · 24711
24712 Boltzmann	1991 RP_{3}	Ludwig Boltzmann, Austrian physicist	JPL · 24712
24713 Ekrutt	1991 RE_{4}	Joachim Ekrutt, German lawyer, tax consultant, and amateur astronomer	JPL · 24713
24726 Nagatatetsuya	1991 VY	Tetsuya Nagata (b. 1957) is a professor at Kyoto University. He has contributed to the understanding of the interstellar medium, particularly in the central region of the Milky Way Galaxy, through various infrared observations including polarimetry.	IAU · 24726
24728 Scagell	1991 VO_{2}	Robin Scagell, British author, consultant and broadcaster on astronomy	JPL · 24728
24732 Leonardcohen	1992 CL_{2}	Leonard Cohen (1934–2016) was a Canadian singer, songwriter, poet and novelist. His song "Suzanne" was one of many that became a hit. He was honored with one of the Prince of Asturias awards. Name suggested by K. Leterme.	JPL · 24732
24734 Kareness	1992 EA_{1}	Karen Penelope Steel ("Karen Ess"), British geneticist and elder sister of the discoverer	JPL · 24734
24748 Nernst	1992 ST_{13}	Walther Hermann Nernst, German chemist	JPL · 24748
24749 Grebel	1992 SM_{17}	Eva K. Grebel, German astronomer	JPL · 24749
24750 Ohm	1992 SR_{17}	Georg Simon Ohm, German physicist	JPL · 24750
24751 Kroemer	1992 SS_{24}	Herbert Kroemer, German-American physicist and Nobelist	JPL · 24751
24753 Fujikake	1992 UU_{5}	Youhei Fujikake (b. 1967) is a technical advisor for the municipal planetariums in Nagoya, Osaka, Himeji, Hiroshima and Fukuoka. He is also an amateur astronomer.	IAU · 24753
24754 Zellyfry	1992 UE_{6}	The traditional food Zellyfry is made from potatoes and okra. Zellyfry is similar to Japanese Korokke but has no butter. Its name comes from the fact that it looks like zeni, old Japanese money. Its roots come from the Japanese-Russian war and the Chinese vegetable manju	JPL · 24754
24757 Kusano	1992 VN	Takanori Kusano (b. 1971), a Japanese pharmacist and amateur astronomer.	IAU · 24757
24761 Ahau	1993 BW_{2}	Kinich Ahau (Ahau-Kin, "Lord of the Sun-face"), Mayan Sun-god	JPL · 24761
24778 Nemsu	1993 KW_{1}	New Mexico State University † ‡	MPC · 24778
24779 Presque Isle	1993 OD_{2}	University of Maine at Presque Isle, Presque Isle, Maine, location of a 65-km long scale model of the Solar System, on the occasion of its centennial in 2003	JPL · 24779
24794 Kurland	1993 UB_{7}	Kurland or Courland, the ancient (13th–18th centuries) name of the districts Zemgale and Kurzeme of present-day Latvia	JPL · 24794

== 24801–24900 ==
back to top

Named minor planet	Provisional	This minor planet was named for...	Ref; Catalog
24808 Iwanaguchi	1994 TN_{1}	Eiichi Iwanaguchi (b. 1976), a Japanese amateur astronomer.	IAU · 24808
24816 Einagahideo	1994 VU_{6}	Hideo Einaga (b. 1949), a Japanese amateur astronomer.	IAU · 24816
24818 Menichelli	1994 WX	Marco Menichelli (born 1942), an Italian amateur astronomer, software developer for transient objects, and member of the astronomer team at Pistoia Mountains Astronomical Observatory. He lives in Fiesole, near Florence.	MPC · 24818
24825 Ebeshireiko	1995 QB_{2}	Reiko Ebeshi (b. 1958), a Japanese amateur astronomer.	IAU · 24825
24826 Pascoli	1995 QN_{2}	Giovanni Pascoli (1855–1912), an Italian poet and classical scholar	JPL · 24826
24827 Maryphil	1995 RA	Mary Clark (born 1938) and Phil Spahr (born 1938) are the parents of the discoverer.	JPL · 24827
24829 Berounurbi	1995 SH_{1}	The Czech town of Beroun. The royal town was founded in the year 1265, at a strategic position southwest of Prague near the Berounka river. Now an important industrial, transportation and tourist center, the town has a rich history as evidenced by a well-preserved downtown urban zone	JPL · 24829
24830 Kawanotomoyoshi	1995 ST_{3}	Tomoyoshi Kawano (b. 1956), a Japanese electrical engineer and amateur astronomer.	IAU · 24830
24837 Mšecké Žehrovice	1995 UQ_{1}	The Czech village of Mšecké Žehrovice in central Bohemia is known for its remnants of an ancient Celtic sanctuary.	MPC · 24837
24838 Abilunon	1995 UJ_{2}	Abilunon is the presumed name of an ancient Celtic town, founded in the 1st century BC on a strategic peninsula of the Vltava river, the Czech Republic.	MPC · 24838
24841 Imatani	1995 UY_{8}	Takuro Imatani (b. 1968), a Japanese electrical engineer and amateur astronomer.	IAU · 24841
24844 Hwanginjoon	1995 VM_{1}	Injoon Hwang (b. 1966), a Korean amateur astronomer.	IAU · 24844
24847 Polesný	1995 WE_{6}	Bohumil Polesný (1905–1976) was a Czech astronomer and astronomy popularizer who started the construction of the Kleť Observatory and served as director of the preceding (České Budějovice) observatory during the 1950s and 1960s.	MPC · 24847
24850 Biagiomarin	1995 XA	Biagio Marin (1891–1985) was an Italian poet and writer, born in territories then belonging to the Austro-Hungarian Empire. He is best known for his poems in the Venetian language.	IAU · 24850
24856 Messidoro	1996 AA_{4}	Piero Messidoro (born 1950) is an Italian space engineer who has developed projects and technologies in human and robotic space exploration, notably the International Space Station, new generation transportation systems and moon and Mars missions. He gives international lectures on space exploration system engineering	JPL · 24856
24857 Sperello	1996 AH_{4}	Sperello di Serego Alighieri (born 1952) is an Italian astrophysicist who made major contributions to the field of extragalactic astronomy. He is a descendant of Dante Alighieri.	JPL · 24857
24858 Diethelm	1996 BB_{1}	Roger Diethelm (born 1948), a Swiss astronomer and observer of variable stars, who founded the R. Szafraniec Observatory (577)/(590) in Metzerlen, Switzerland, where Marek Wolf, who discovered this minor planet, previously observed. Diethelm is also the editor of the variable-stars bulletin of the Swiss Astronomical Society (German: Schweizerische Astronomische Gesellschaft).	JPL · 24858
24862 Hromec	1996 DC_{3}	Arnost Hromec (1924–2013), was a Slovak specialist in internal medicine, recipient of the prize and medal of the Slovak Medical Association and of the Reiman medal.	JPL · 24862
24863 Cheli	1996 EB	Maurizio Cheli (born 1959), an Italian air force officer and ESA astronaut, who flew with NASA's STS-75 Space Shuttle mission in 1996.	IAU · 24863
24889 Tamurahosinomura	1996 XU_{32}	"Tamurahosinomura" ("the star village") opened in 1992 near the Abukumado limestone cave in Fukushima prefecture. The 0.65-m reflector at Hoshinomura Observatory was rendered unrepairable by the Great Eastern Japan Earthquake in March 2011, but was reborn as the "KIZUNA Telescope" in July 2012.	JPL · 24889
24890 Amaliafinzi	1996 XV_{32}	Amalia Ercoli Finzi (born 1937), a professor of Aerospace Mechanics and an Honorary Professor at Politecnico di Milano, is a researcher and an educator in Spaceflight Dynamics and Space Mission Design. She was the P.I. of the SD2 instrument, on board of the Philae lander on Rosetta, to drill and sample comet 67P.	JPL · 24890
24898 Alanholmes	1997 AR_{17}	Alan W. Holmes (born 1950), an American optical engineer and amateur gamma-ray burst astronomer, who helped spark the CCD astronomical revolution. He is a member of the Santa Barbara Astronomical Group.	MPC · 24898
24899 Dominiona	1997 AU_{17}	Canada, officially the "Dominion of Canada" under the Constitution Acts of 1867 and 1982.	MPC · 24899

== 24901–25000 ==
back to top

Named minor planet	Provisional	This minor planet was named for...	Ref; Catalog
24907 Alfredhaar	1997 CO_{4}	Alfréd Haar, Hungarian mathematician	JPL · 24907
24910 Haruoando	1997 CK_{29}	Haruo Ando (born 1951), a doctor of internal medicine, is a Japanese amateur astronomer and a member of the Yamagata Astronomical Club	JPL · 24910
24911 Kojimashigemi	1997 DU	Shigemi Kojima (born 1931) built a private observatory in 1974, with a 0.25-m reflector in a dome he opens wholeheartedly to local children and citizens. He is also now an adviser to the Astronomical Society of Shikoku	JPL · 24911
24916 Stelzhamer	1997 EK_{11}	Franz Stelzhamer (1802–1874) was an Austrian poet and novelist who wrote the words to the Austrian national anthem and whose "s'Hoamatgsang" is the anthem of the Upper Austria province.	MPC · 24916
24918 Tedkooser	1997 EO_{17}	Ted Kooser, American poet, Poet Laureate of the United States in 2004	JPL · 24918
24919 Teruyoshi	1997 ER_{17}	Teruyoshi Ibi (born 1956), is a science teacher at a junior high school in Kitakyushu. He is also a well-known amateur astronomer and acted as a branch director of the Fukuoka Astronomical Society	JPL · 24919
24922 Bechtel	1997 EH_{33}	Marian Joan Bechtel (born 1994), a finalist in the 2012 Intel Science Talent Search, a science competition for high-school seniors, for her engineering project.	JPL · 24922
24923 Claralouisa	1997 EB_{37}	Clara Louisa Fannjiang (born 1994), a finalist in the 2012 Intel Science Talent Search for her engineering project and was also awarded second place in the 2011 Intel International Science and Engineering Fair.	JPL · 24923
24926 Jinpan	1997 GB_{8}	Jin Pan (born 1994), a finalist in the 2012 Intel Science Talent Search, a science competition for high-school seniors, for his bioinformatics and genomics project.	JPL · 24926
24927 Brianpalmer	1997 GP_{12}	Brian Palmer, mentor of a finalist in the 2012 Intel Science Talent Search, a science competition for high-school seniors.	JPL · 24927
24928 Susanbehel	1997 GK_{13}	Susan Behel, mentor of a finalist in the 2012 Intel Science Talent Search, a science competition for high-school seniors.	JPL · 24928
24930 Annajamison	1997 GL_{17}	Anna Jamison, mentor of a finalist in the 2012 Intel Science Talent Search, a science competition for high-school seniors.	JPL · 24930
24931 Noeth	1997 GO_{18}	William Noeth, mentor of a finalist in the 2012 Intel Science Talent Search, a science competition for high-school seniors.	JPL · 24931
24934 Natecovert	1997 GK_{36}	Nathaniel Covert, mentor of a finalist in the 2012 Intel Science Talent Search, a science competition for high-school seniors.	JPL · 24934
24935 Godfreyhardy	1997 HP_{2}	Godfrey Harold Hardy, British mathematician	JPL · 24935
24939 Chiminello	1997 JR	Vincenzo Chiminello (1741–1815), nephew of Giuseppe Toaldo, was an Italian astronomer and translator	JPL · 24939
24940 Sankichiyama	1997 JY_{4}	Sankichiyama mountain is located to the east of Kaminoyama, a hot-spring town in Yamagata prefecture. The mountain is loved by citizens as a hiking course	JPL · 24940
24944 Harish-Chandra	1997 LZ_{4}	Harish-Chandra, Indian-American mathematician	JPL · 24944
24945 Houziaux	1997 LH_{9}	Léo Houziaux (born 1932), a Belgian astrophysicist at University of Liège, specialized in stellar structure at Mt. Wilson and Palomar.	JPL · 24945
24946 Foscolo	1997 NQ	Ugo Foscolo (1778–1827), leader of exponent of Neoclassic and Pre-Romanticism Italian literature	JPL · 24946
24947 Hausdorff	1997 NU_{1}	Felix Hausdorff, German mathematician	JPL · 24947
24948 Babote	1997 NU_{6}	Babote tower, the former Babote Observatory, Montpellier, France, now the meeting place of the members of the Société Astronomique de Montpellier	JPL · 24948
24949 Klačka	1997 PZ_{1}	Slovak physicist Jozef Klačka (born 1963) is an associate professor at Comenius University, Bratislava. His theoretical research centers on the orbital evolution of dust particles, taking into account various effects (e.g., particle shape, solar wind, Yarkovsky effect)	JPL · 24949
24950 Nikhilas	1997 QF	Nikhilas Jonathan Marsden (born 1995) is the first grandson of Brian G. Marsden, a director of the Minor Planet Center.	MPC · 24950
24956 Qiannan	1997 SN_{10}	Qiannan Buyi and Miao Autonomous Prefecture (Qiannan), with a population of 4.2 million from 43 ethnic groups, is an autonomous prefecture of Guizhou Province, P.R. China.	JPL · 24956
24959 Zielenbach	1997 TR	Bill Zielenbach (born 1943), a former rocket scientist.	JPL · 24959
24960 Usukikenichi	1997 TV_{17}	Kenichi Usuki (1967–2023) was the first winner of the Astronomical Society of Japan (ASJ ) Award for Outstanding Achievement by an Amateur in 2001. He launched a project to preserve the Nisshinkan Observatory ruins that was certified as the first Japan Astronomical Heritage by ASJ in 2019.	IAU · 24960
24962 Kenjitoba	1997 UX_{8}	Kenji Toba (born 1950), Japanese amateur astronomer, discoverer of comet C/1971 E1, and director of the BiStar Observatory (see 14492 Bistar) since its foundation	JPL · 24962
24965 Akayu	1997 WC_{2}	The Japanese town of Akayu is situated in the southern part of Nanyo city in the Yamagata Prefecture.	JPL · 24965
24967 Frištenský	1998 AX_{8}	Gustav Frištenský, Czech wrestler.	JPL · 24967
24968 Chernyakhovsky	1998 BY_{12}	Alexander Chernyakhovsky, American 2008 Intel International Science and Engineering Fair (ISEF) winner	JPL · 24968
24969 Lucafini	1998 CD_{2}	Luca Fini (born 1952) is an astronomer, software developer and system manager at the Arcetri Observatory in Florence, Italy.	MPC · 24969
24974 Macúch	1998 HG_{3}	Rudolf Macúch, 20th-century Slovak orientalist and humanist	JPL · 24974
24976 Jurajtoth	1998 HE_{51}	Juraj Toth (born 1975), a researcher at the Comenius University in Bratislava.	JPL · 24976
24977 Tongzhan	1998 HE_{87}	Tong Zhan, American 2008 Intel International Science and Engineering Fair (ISEF) winner	JPL · 24977
24981 Shigekimurakami	1998 KB_{5}	Shigeki Murakami (born 1962), a Japanese amateur astronomer from Shiga Prefecture and co-discoverer of comet C/2002 E2 and 332P/Ikeya–Murakami. He is a senior researcher at the Forestry and Forest Products Research Institute. His discoveries he made with a homemade 0.46-meter Dobsonian telescope.	JPL · 24981
24984 Usui	1998 KQ_{42}	Fumihiko Usui (born 1974), a research associate at the University of Tokyo.	JPL · 24984
24985 Benuri	1998 KW_{45}	Benjamin Uri Hoffman, American 2008 Intel International Science and Engineering Fair (ISEF) winner	JPL · 24985
24986 Yalefan	1998 KS_{46}	Yale Wang Fan, American 2008 Intel International Science and Engineering Fair (ISEF) winner	JPL · 24986
24988 Alainmilsztajn	1998 MM_{2}	Alain Milsztajn (1955–2007) was a French particle physicist and astronomer	JPL · 24988
24994 Prettyman	1998 MZ_{37}	Thomas H. Prettyman (born 1964), a senior scientist with the Planetary Science Institute.	JPL · 24994
24996 Zerocalcare	1998 OD_{1}	Zerocalcare is the pseudonym of Michele Rech (b. 1983), an Italian cartoonist, illustrator, and graphic designer.	IAU · 24996
24997 Petergabriel	1998 OO_{3}	Peter Gabriel (born 1950), English rock musician, cofounder of the Genesis progressive rock group	JPL · 24997
24998 Hermite	1998 OQ_{4}	Charles Hermite (1822–1901), French mathematician	JPL · 24998
24999 Hieronymus	1998 OY_{4}	Hieronymus Bosch (c. 1450–1516), Dutch painter †	MPC · 24999
25000 Astrometria	1998 OW_{5}	Latin for Astrometry	JPL · 25000

back to top

Preceded by 23,001–24,000	Meanings of minor-planet names List of minor planets: 24,001–25,000	Succeeded by 25,001–26,000
