= 332P/Ikeya–Murakami =

Periodic comet

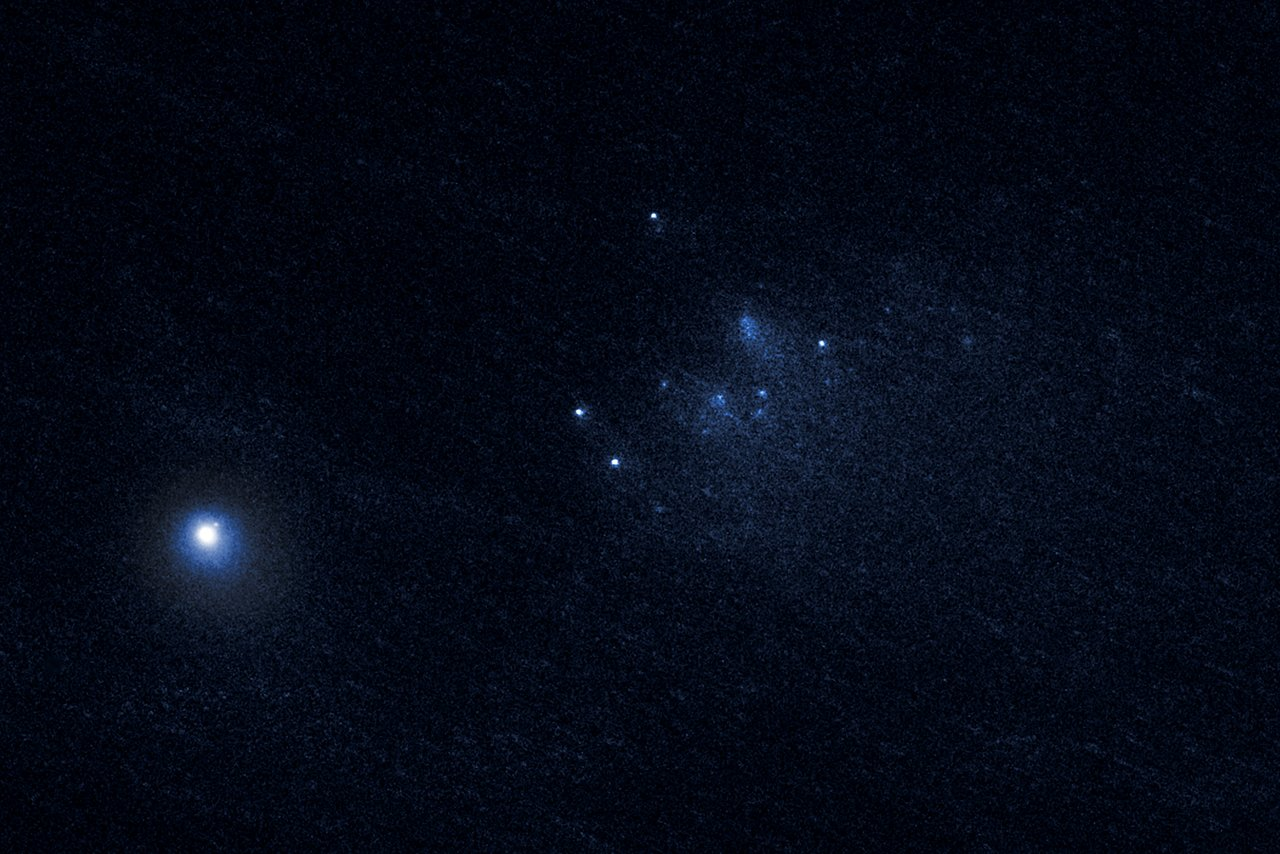
- 332P/Ikeya–Murakami photographed by the Hubble Space Telescope in January 2016.

Discovery
- Discovered by: Kaoru Ikeya; Shigeki Murakami
- Discovery date: 3 November 2010

Designations
- MPC designation: P/2010 V1, P/2015 Y2

Orbital characteristics
- Epoch: 2016 Jan. 13
- Observation arc: 124 days (fragment A)
- Perihelion: 1.573 AU (q)
- Eccentricity: 0.4904
- Orbital period: 5.42 yr (1980 days)
- Inclination: 9.387°
- Last perihelion: 18 August 2021 (A) (unobserved)
- Next perihelion: 19 January 2027? (A); 6 June 2027?? (F)
- Earth MOID: 0.59 AU (A)
- Jupiter MOID: 0.46 AU (A); 0.34 AU (F)

Physical characteristics
- Mean radius: ≤ 2 km (original nucleus) ≤ 275 meters (A+C) ≤ 20 meters (F)
- Geometric albedo: 0.04 (assumed)
- Comet total magnitude (M1): 5.2
- Comet nuclear magnitude (M2): 12.5

332P/Ikeya–Murakami (P/2010 V1) is a short-period comet with period of approximately 5.4 years first identified independently by the two Japanese amateur astronomers Kaoru Ikeya and Shigeki Murakami on November 3, 2010. As 332P/Ikeya–Murakami only approaches within 1.57 AU of the Sun, roughly Mars distance from the Sun, the fragmentation events may be a result of rapid rotation. The comet was last observed in October 2020 as during the 2021 perihelion passage the comet was only 7 degrees from the Sun. The comet will next come to perihelion in January 2027 when it will have a solar elongation of 100 degrees.

== Observational history ==
Ikeya identified the comet using a 25-centimeter (10-inch) reflector at 39×, while Murakami used a 46 cm (18-inch) reflector at 78×. Photographic confirmation of the comet was obtained by Ernesto Guido and Giovanni Sostero using a Global-Rent-a-Scope (GRAS) telescope in New Mexico. Both Ikeya and Murakami discovered the comet using manual observation through optical telescopes. Such visual discoveries have become rare in recent years.

At the start of November 2010, a few weeks past perihelion passage, it was discovered the comet had undergone a major outburst between October 31 and November 3. After the 2010 perihelion passage, the comet only had about an 80-day observation arc.

The recovery of P/2010 V1 on December 31, 2015, at magnitude 20 was announced on January 2, 2016, and designated as P/2015 Y2. A secondary fragment (B) was confirmed and announced on January 5, 2016. The comet is now composed of component A and B with two different comas, envelopes and tails. Around January 11, 2016, two fainter potential fragments, designated P/2010 V1-C and P/2010 V1-D have been located, both likely having been fragmented from P/2010 V1-B. As of January 29, fragments B and D had nearly entirely disintegrated, and fragment C had undergone an outburst, making it as bright as P/2010 V1-A.

Fragment–A has a 124-day observation arc, and fragment–F has the poorest orbit determination as it has a short arc of only 11-days. Most of the fragments are estimated to have an orbital period of about 1980 days. Fragment–F is estimated to have a longer orbital period of around 2050 days. After two orbits (11 years) of becoming divergent, fragment–F is estimated to come to perihelion 4 months and 18 days after fragment–A.

== Fragments ==
Comet fragment	semimajor axis (AU)	perihelion	eccentricity	inclination	M2	ascending node	argument of peri	Discovery date
A	3.08642	1.572883	0.49039	9.3869	19.3	3.7827	152.442	2016/01/02
B	3.0834	1.57287	0.48989	9.3824	20.8	3.796	152.378	2016/01/01
C	3.0894	1.57293	0.49086	9.3870	12.5	3.7810	152.430	2010/11/03
D	3.083	1.5714	0.4904	9.379	19.5	3.76	152.6	2016/02/01
E	3.09	1.573	0.491	9.39	22.5	3.8	152.5	2016/01/18
F	3.15	1.585	0.496	9.51	22.1	3.60	152.4	2016/02/05
G	3.06	1.551	0.494	9.27	20.6	3.6	154.5	2016/02/10
H	3.0860	1.57283	0.49033	9.3857	18.9	3.786	152.421	2016/02/05
I	3.083	1.5730	0.490	9.38	21.7	3.80	152.4	2016/02/05

== See also ==
- 73P/Schwassmann–Wachmann
- 141P/Machholz

Numbered comets
Previous; 331P/Gibbs	332P/Ikeya–Murakami	Next; 333P/LINEAR
