= Silke Weinfurtner =

German physicist

- Education: Technical University of Munich; Max Planck Institute of Quantum Optics (MS); Victoria University of Wellington (PhD)
- Awards: Buchalter Cosmology Prize (2018)
- Scientific career
- Fields: Quantum gravity; Analog gravity
- Workplaces: University of Nottingham
- Doctoral advisor: Matt Visser

Silke Weinfurtner is a German-British physicist at the University of Nottingham in the United Kingdom. Weinfurtner is best known for her research into black holes and is considered a pioneer in the field of analog gravity.

== Education ==
Weinfurtner studied theoretical physics at the Technical University of Munich and the Max Planck Institute of Quantum Optics in Garching, Germany, under the direction of quantum physicist Ignacio Cirac. She earned her PhD from the Victoria University of Wellington in New Zealand, studying under the supervision of physicist Matt Visser.

== Career ==
In 2012, Weinfurtner was awarded a Vidi grant for her proposal on "quantum gravity in table-top experiments". In 2017, she and her team built an experiment using a custom water bath to simulate the conditions around a black hole. Weinfurtner traces the origin of the technique to her time working at the International School for Advanced Studies in Italy where she "setup an experiment with a bucket and a bidet". After her postdoc, she went on to work with Bill Unruh, discoverer of the Unruh effect.

Weinfurtner set up her own research group at the University of Nottingham in a space called the "Black Hole Laboratory". Her research focuses on trying to mimic the conditions of the Big Bang, using superconducting magnets in a large bathtub to simulate cosmological effects. Comparing real black holes with her analog gravity experiments, Weinfurtner expresses wonder that the "startling mathematical similarities between them that emerge under certain conditions can be exploited", saying that "it just seems like nature threw us a bone when things are really hard". By decreasing the temperature in the water bath, Weinfurtner and her team were able to create a Bose-Einstein condensate, mimicking wave propagation in the early universe.

== Awards and honors ==
- In 2012 and 2013, Weinfurtner won the SISSA Research Award for Young Scientists
- In 2018, Weinfurtner was part of the team that won the third Buchalter Cosmology Prize for their work A New Semiclassical Picture of Vacuum Decay

== Selected publications ==
- Sotiriou, Thomas P.; Visser, Matt; Weinfurtner, Silke (2009), "Phenomenologically Viable Lorentz-Violating Quantum Gravity", Physical Review, 102 (25) 251601, arXiv:0904.4464, Bibcode:2009PhRvL.102y1601S, doi:10.1103/PhysRevLett.102.251601, PMID 19659067
- Weinfurtner, Silke; Tedford, Edmund W.; Penrice, Matthew C.J.; Unruh, William G.; Lawrence, Gregory A. (2010), "Measurement of Stimulated Hawking Emission in an Analogue System", Physical Review, 106 (2) 021302, arXiv:1008.1911, doi:10.1103/PhysRevLett.106.021302, PMID 21405217
- Sotiriou, Thomas P.; Visser, Matt; Weinfurtner, Silke (2011), "Spectral Dimension as a Probe of the Ultraviolet Continuum Regime of Causal Dynamical Triangulations", Physical Review, 107 (13) 131303, arXiv:1105.5646, Bibcode:2011PhRvL.107m1303S, doi:10.1103/PhysRevLett.107.131303, PMID 22026839
