= Buchalter Cosmology Prize =

- Awarded for: ground-breaking work in cosmology with the potential to produce a breakthrough advance in our understanding of how the Universe works
- Country: United States
- Presented by: Ari Buchalter; American Astronomical Society
- First award: 2014
- Website: www.buchaltercosmologyprize.org

The Buchalter Cosmology Prize, established in 2014, is an annual prize bestowed by Ari Buchalter.

Every year, three Buchalter Prizes are awarded in recognition of ground-breaking work in cosmology with the potential to produce a breakthrough advance in our understanding of how the Universe works, particularly by substantially extending or challenging currently-accepted models. The first, second, and third prize come with a prize money of $10,000, $5,000, and $2,500 respectively. The winners are typically announced in the January meeting of the American Astronomical Society (AAS), placing it de facto among the annual AAS prizes.

== Advisors and Judges ==
Submissions and nominations are overseen by a panel composed of the chairman Ari Buchalter, an advisory board composed of two senior physicists, and a Judging Panel composed of three senior physicists. The composition of advisory board and Judging Panel is changed periodically. Current members of the advisory board are David Helfand and Marc Kamionkowski, whereas current members of the Judging Panel are Claudia de Rham, Matthew Johnson, and Justin Khoury.

== Vision and Mission ==
The prize was conceived by Ari Buchalter, a former astrophysicist turned entrepreneur who earned his PhD from Columbia University in 1999 working with David Helfand, on the premise that there are fundamental gaps in our understanding of cosmology, and that several currently-accepted paradigms might be incomplete or incorrect. The prize was created to support the development of new boundary-pushing ideas or discoveries that have the potential to produce a breakthrough advance beyond our present understanding of the Universe.

== Recipients ==
- 2014
  - 1st prize: Marina Cortês and Lee Smolin, for their work The Universe as a Process of Unique Events.
  - 2nd prize: Jonathan Kaufman, Brian Keating, and Brad Johnson, for their work Precision Tests of Parity Violation Over Cosmological Distances.
  - 3rd prize: Carroll Wainwright, Matthew Johnson, Hiranya Peiris, Anthony Aguirre, Luis Lehner, and Steven Liebling, for their work Simulating the Universe(s): from Cosmic Bubble Collisions to Cosmological Observables with Numerical Relativity.
- 2015
  - 1st prize: Julian Barbour, Tim Koslowski, and Flavio Mercati, for their work Identification of a gravitational arrow of time.
  - 2nd prize: Nemanja Kaloper and Antonio Padilla, for their work Sequestering the Standard Model Vacuum Energy.
  - 3rd prize: Niayesh Afshordi and Elliot Nelson, for their work Cosmological Non-Constant Problem: Cosmological bounds on TeV-scale physics and beyond.
- 2016
  - 1st prize: Nima Khosravi, for their work Ensemble Average Theory of Gravity.
  - 2nd prize: Elliot Nelson, for their work Quantum Decoherence During Inflation from Gravitational Nonlinearities.
  - 3rd prize: Cliff Burgess, Richard Holman, Gianmassimo Tasinato, and Matthew Williams, for their work EFT Beyond the Horizon: Stochastic Inflation and How Primordial Quantum Fluctuations Go Classical.
- 2017
  - 1st prize: Lasha Berezhiani and Justin Khoury, for their work Theory of Dark Matter Superfluidity.
  - 2nd prize: Steffen Gielen and Neil Turok, for their work Perfect Quantum Cosmological Bounce.
  - 3rd prize: Peter Adshead, Diego Blas, Cliff Burgess, Peter Hayman, and Subodh Patil, for their work Magnon Inflation: Slow Roll with Steep Potentials.
- 2018
  - 1st prize: José Ramón Espinosa, Davide Racco, and Antonio Riotto, for their work A Cosmological Signature of the Standard Model Higgs Vacuum Instability: Primordial Black Holes as Dark Matter.
  - 2nd prize: Douglas Edmonds, Duncan Farrah, Djordje Minic, Jack Ng, and Tatsu Takeuchi, for their work Modified Dark Matter: Relating Dark Energy, Dark Matter and Baryonic Matter.
  - 3rd prize: Jonathan Braden, Matthew Johnson, Hiranya Peiris, Andrew Pontzen, and Silke Weinfurtner, for their work A New Semiclassical Picture of Vacuum Decay.
- 2019
  - 1st prize: Jahed Abedi and Niayesh Afshordi, for their work Echoes from the Abyss: A highly spinning black hole remnant for the binary neutron star merger GW170817.
  - 2nd prize: Eugenio Bianchi, Anuradha Gupta, Hal Haggard, and Bangalore Sathyaprakash, for their work Quantum gravity and black hole spin in gravitational wave observations: a test of the Bekenstein-Hawking entropy
  - 3rd prize: Jose Beltrán Jiménez, Lavinia Heisenberg, and Tomi Koivisto, for their work The Geometrical Trinity of Gravity.
- 2020
  - 1st prize: Daniel Green and Rafael Porto, for their work Signals of a Quantum Universe.
  - 2nd prize: Mikhail Ivanov, Marko Simonović, and Matias Zaldarriaga, for their work Cosmological parameters from the BOSS Galaxy Power Spectrum.
  - 3rd prize: Philip Mocz, Anastasia Fialkov, Mark Vogelsberger, Fernando Becerra, Mustafa Amin, Sownak Bose, Michael Boylan-Kolchin, Pierre-Henri Chavanis, Lars Hernquist, Lachlan Lancaster, Federico Marinacci, Victor Robles, and Jesús Zavala, for their work First star-forming structures in fuzzy cosmic filaments.
- 2021
  - 1st prize: Karsten Jedamzik and Levon Pogosian, for their work Relieving the Hubble tension with primordial magnetic fields.
  - 2nd prize: Azadeh Maleknejad, for their work SU(2)_{R} and its Axion in Cosmology: A common Origin for Inflation, Cold Sterile Neutrinos, and Baryogenesis.
  - 3rd prize: Sunny Vagnozzi, Luca Visinelli, Philippe Brax, Anne-Christine Davis, and Jeremy Sakstein, for their work Direct detection of dark energy: the XENON1T excess and future prospects.
- 2022
  - 1st prize: Samuel Goldstein, Angelo Esposito, Oliver Philcox, Lam Hui, J. Colin Hill, Roman Scoccimarro and Maximilian Abitbol for their work Squeezing fNL out of the matter bispectrum with consistency relations.
  - 2nd prize: Diego Blas, and Alexander Jenkins for their work Bridging the μHz gap in the gravitational-wave landscape with binary resonance.
  - 3rd prize: Daniel Figueroa, Adrien Florio, Nicolas Loayza and Mauro Pieroni for their work Stairway to Heaven: Spectroscopy of Particle Couplings with Gravitational Waves.
- 2023
  - 1st prize: Kyle Boone and Matthew McQuinn for their work Solar System-scale interferometry on fast radio bursts could measure cosmic distances with sub-percent precision.
  - 2nd prize: Denis Werth, Lucas Pinol, and Sébastien Renaux-Petel for their work Cosmological Flow of Primordial Correlators.
  - 3rd prize: Gabriele Franciolini, Davide Racco, and Fabrizio Rompineve for their work Footprints of the QCD Crossover on Cosmological Gravitational Waves at Pulsar Timing Arrays.
- 2024
  - 1st prize: The Canadian Hydrogen Intensity Mapping Experiment (CHIME), for their work Detection of Cosmological 21 cm Emission with the Canadian Hydrogen Intensity Mapping Experiment.
  - 2nd prize: Nathaniel Craig, Daniel Green, Joel Meyers, Surjeet Rajendran, for their work No νs is Good News.
  - 3rd prize: Nhat-Minh Nguyen, Fabian Schmidt, Beatriz Tucci, Martin Reinecke, Andrija Kostić, for their work How much information can be extracted from galaxy clustering at the field level?
- 2025
  - 1st prize: Christopher Cain, Matthew McQuinn, Evan Scannapieco, Anson D'Aloisio, Hy Trac, for their work Kiloparsec-scale turbulence driven by reionization may grow intergalactic magnetic fields.
  - 2nd prize: Adam Smith, Maria Mylova, Philippe Brax, Carsten van de Bruck, Clifford Burgess, Anne-Christine Davis, for their work A Minimal Axio-dilaton Dark Sector.
  - 3rd prize: Harsh Mehta, Suvodip Mukherjee, for their work A Diffused Background from Axion-like Particles in the Microwave Sky.

=== Perimeter Institute ===
Since its inception, the prize has been highly dominated by Perimeter Institute, whose researchers and associates featured for six consecutive years among the prize winners between 2014 and 2019.
