= Antonio Padilla =

British physicist (born 1975)

- Education: Cambridge University; Durham University
- Awards: Buchalter Cosmology Prize (2016)
- Scientific career
- Fields: Theoretical physics
- Workplaces: University of Nottingham
- Thesis: Braneworld Cosmology and Holography (2002)
- Doctoral advisor: Ruth Gregory
- Website: www.nottingham.ac.uk/physics/people/antonio.padilla

Antonio Padilla (born 1975), also known as Tony Padilla, is a British theoretical physicist and science populariser. He is Professor of Physics at the University of Nottingham, where he is also associate director of the Nottingham Centre of Gravity.

== Early life and education ==
Padilla studied at Cambridge University as an undergraduate, and completed his PhD at Durham University in 2002. At Durham he was part of the Centre for Particle Theory, a research group with members in both the Department of Mathematical Sciences and Department of Physics.

== Career ==
Padilla held research positions at the University of Oxford and the University of Barcelona before joining the University of Nottingham. He is active in science communication, and is a recurring presenter on the YouTube series Numberphile and its sister channel, Sixty Symbols.

In 2016, he and collaborator Nemanja Kaloper of the University of California, Davis received the Buchalter Cosmology Prize for their work on the cosmological constant problem. Kaloper and Padilla devised a new strategy; this involved rewriting Einstein's equations to 'effectively cancel out the input from quantum fluctuations' and treat the cosmological constant as an average of the matter contribution over all of space and time. This produced a 'relatively small cosmological constant', but also predicted that universe expansion will eventually reverse direction.

In 2022, Padilla released Fantastic Numbers and Where to Find Them, which explains the role played by vast and ultra-small numbers in contemporary physics. The book was developed from a series of public lectures delivered by Padilla to raise money for a friend to receive cancer treatment abroad. Topics covered include the theory of Graham's number.
