= John Veitch =

John Veitch may refer to:

- John Veitch (cricketer) (1937–2009), New Zealand cricketer
- John Veitch (horticulturist) (1752–1839), founder of Veitch Nurseries
- John Veitch (poet) (1829–1894), Scottish poet, philosopher, and historian
- John Gould Veitch (1839–1870), horticulturist
- John Veitch (footballer) (1869–1914), England and Corinthian footballer
- John M. Veitch (born 1945), American horse trainer
- Jonathan Veitch (born 1959), dean of Eugene Lang College and president of Occidental College
