= Philip Mocz =

Computational Physicist

- Mocz in 2023
- Born: December 3, 1989 (age 36)
- Education: Harvard University (AB, PhD)
- Awards: Buchalter Cosmology Prize (2020); Keto Award (2017); Intel Science Talent Search (2008)
- Scientific career
- Fields: Astrophysics; Computational Physics
- Workplaces: Flatiron Institute; Lawrence Livermore National Laboratory; Princeton University
- Thesis: Moving Mesh Magnetohydrodynamics: Magnetic Processes in Star Formation and Cosmology (2017)
- Doctoral advisor: Lars Hernquist

Philip Mocz (born December 3, 1989) is an American astrophysicist and software engineer at the Flatiron Institute.

== Life ==
He graduated from Harvard University with an AB in Mathematics and Astrophysics in 2012, and a PhD in astrophysics, in 2017.

== Awards ==
- Buchalter Cosmology Prize (2020) in recognition of his work on cosmological simulations of scalar-field dark matter
- Keto Award (2017) for his PhD thesis "Moving Mesh Magnetohydrodynamics: Magnetic Processes in Star Formation and Cosmology"
- Intel Science Talent Search (2008) winner

== Works ==
- "First Star-Forming Structures in Fuzzy Cosmic Filaments", Physical Review Letters, Authors: P. Mocz, A. Fialkov, M. Vogelsberger, F. Becerra, M.A. Amin, S. Bose, M. Boylan-Kolchin, P.-H. Chavanis, L. Hernquist, L. Lancaster, F. Marinacci, V.H. Robles, J. Zavala.
