= 333P/LINEAR =

Jupiter-family comet

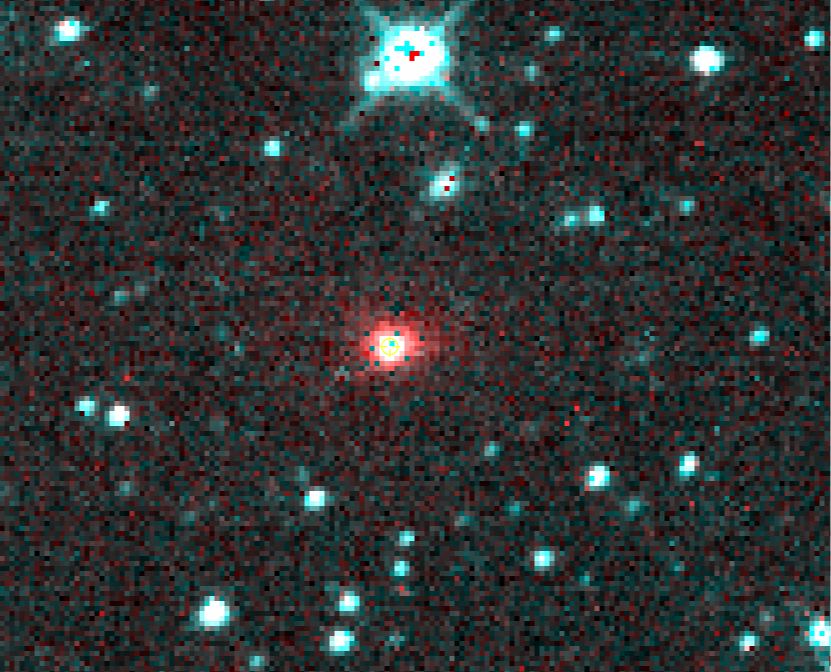
- Comet 333P/LINEAR photographed by NEOWISE on 21 February 2016

Discovery
- Discovery site: LINEAR
- Discovery date: 4 November 2007

Designations
- MPC designation: P/2007 VA_{85}
- Alternative designations: LINEAR 66

Orbital characteristics
- Epoch: 21 November 2025 (JD 2461000.5)
- Observation arc: 17.87 years
- Number of observations: 1,340
- Aphelion: 7.329 AU
- Perihelion: 1.113 AU
- Semi-major axis: 4.222 AU
- Eccentricity: 0.73629
- Orbital period: 8.674 years
- Inclination: 132.02°
- Longitude of ascending node: 115.71°
- Argument of periapsis: 26.033°
- Mean anomaly: 40.531°
- Last perihelion: 29 November 2024
- Next perihelion: 1 August 2033
- T_{Jupiter}: 0.418
- Earth MOID: 0.176 AU
- Jupiter MOID: 0.364 AU

Physical characteristics
- Mean radius: 3.04 km (1.89 mi)
- Synodic rotation period: 21.04 hours
- Spectral type: (V–R) = 0.44±0.01
- Comet total magnitude (M1): 15.0
- Apparent magnitude: 10.7 (2024 apparition)

333P/LINEAR is a Jupiter-family comet in an 8.7-year retrograde orbit around the Sun. Upon discovery, it was the object with the shortest known retrograde orbit. The comet was discovered by LINEAR on 4 November 2007.

== Observational history ==
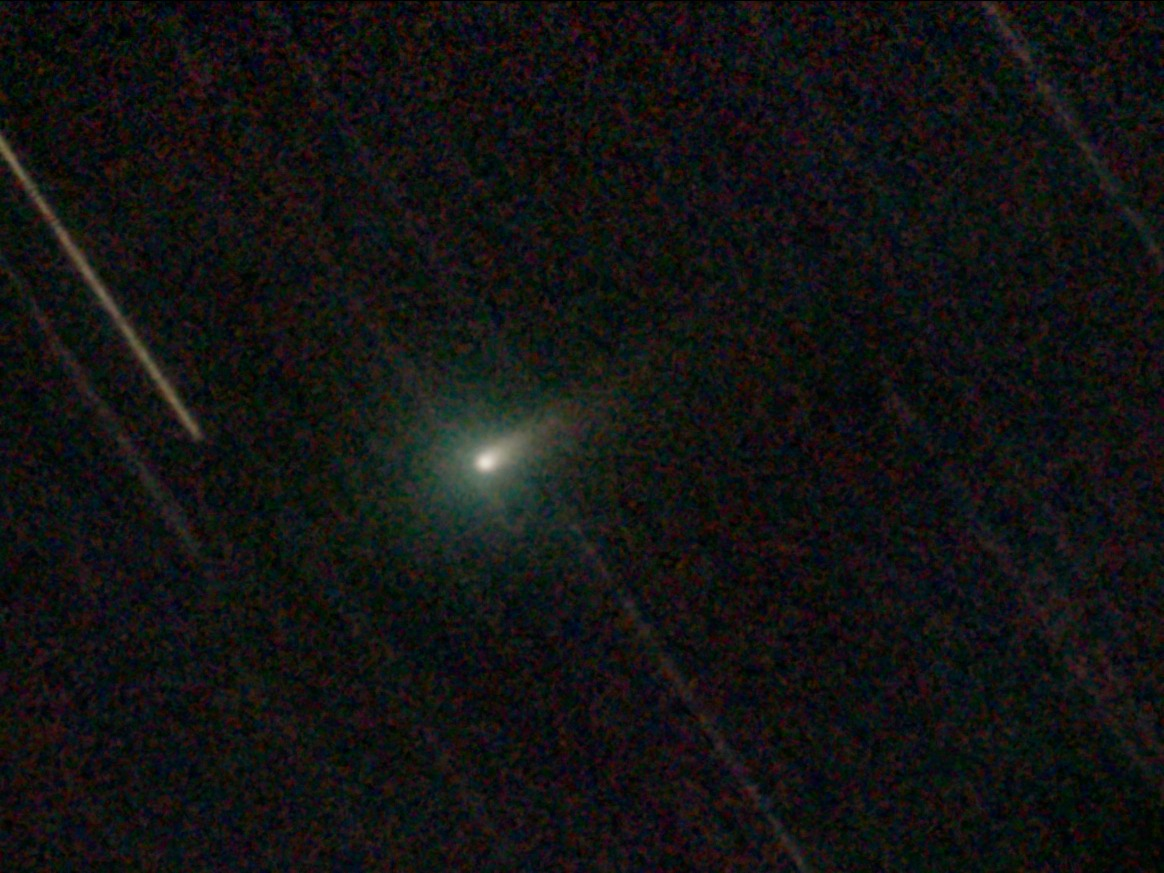
The comet on 30 November 2024, featuring a green coma and a short tail.

When discovered on 4 November 2007, the comet had an apparent magnitude of 18.5–19 and was asteroidal in appearance. It was given the provisional designation 2007 VA_{85}. During the next apparition, it was recovered by the iTelescope Observatory, in Siding Spring, Australia, on 18 November 2015, when it had an apparent magnitude of around 20, and on 1 January 2016 by the SONEAR observatory. A small tail was observed and thus it was recategorised as a comet. It brightened rapidly and reached a magnitude of 12.6 on 28 March 2016. During the 2024 apparition, the comet approached Earth at a distance of 0.55 AU (82 million km) and brightened up to a magnitude of 10.7 in early December. The Sampurnanand Telescope in Nainital, India observed the comet three times between December 2024 and March 2025, obtaining photopolarimetric measurements alongside C/2023 H5 (Lemmon).

The comet received its official numerical designation (333P) alongside 91 other periodic comets on January 2017.

== Orbit ==
When discovered, the comet was the first object with retrograde orbit within Jupiter's orbit. It was categorised as an Amor asteroid and was briefly considered potentially hazardous to Earth. Simulations indicated it was a comet nucleus that was possibly put into its current orbit after an interaction with Jupiter and in the future it will collide with the Sun or migrate beyond the orbit of Jupiter. The cometary activity has been found to play a role in the orbital evolution of the comet.

== Physical characteristics ==
Infrared observations from both NEOWISE and the Spitzer Space Telescope indicate a nucleus radii of around 3.04 km (1.89 mi), a fairly large comet relative to other Jupiter-family comets. Photometric studies conducted at the Table Mountain Observatory in 2016 revealed that the comet may have a best-fit rotation period of around 21.04 hours, although it may be possible that it could be half that value (10.5 hours) if the short term variability is caused by a single active area coming into and out of direct sunlight.

== See also ==
- 343158 Marsyas - near-Earth asteroid in retrograde orbit

Numbered comets
Previous; 332P/Ikeya–Murakami	333P/LINEAR	Next; 334P/NEAT
