= Levon Pogosian =

- Education: Yerevan State University; West Virginia University; Case Western Reserve University
- Scientific career
- Fields: Cosmology
- Workplaces: Simon Fraser University
- Doctoral advisor: Tanmay Vachaspati
- Website: www.sfu.ca/physics/people/faculty/levon.html

Levon Pogosian is a cosmologist and a Professor of Physics at Simon Fraser University.

Pogosian works on a range topics that include cosmic microwave background, large scale structure, dark energy and modified gravity, observational probes of physics beyond Standard Model, cosmic (super)strings and other topological defects, and cosmological magnetic fields. Pogosian and his collaborator Karsten Jedamzik from the University of Montpellier shared the 2021 Buchalter Cosmology Prize (First Prize) for their research on relieving the Hubble tension with primordial magnetic fields.
