= List of minor planets: 113001–114000 =

The following is a partial list of minor planets, running from minor-planet number 113001 through 114000, inclusive. The primary data for this and other partial lists is based on JPL's "Small-Body Orbital Elements" and data available from the Minor Planet Center. Critical list information is also provided by the MPC, unless otherwise specified from Lowell Observatory. A detailed description of the table's columns and additional sources are given on the main page including a complete list of every page in this series, and a statistical break-up on the dynamical classification of minor planets.

Also see the summary list of all named bodies in numerical and alphabetical order, and the corresponding naming citations for the number range of this particular list. New namings may only be added to this list after official publication, as the preannouncement of names is condemned by the Working Group for Small Bodies Nomenclature of the International Astronomical Union.

Near-Earth obj.	MBA (inner)	MBA (outer)	Centaur
Mars-crosser	MBA (middle)	Jupiter trojan	Trans-Neptunian obj.
Unclassified

== 113001–113100 ==
Designation			Discovery			Properties		Ref
Permanent	Provisional	Named after	Date	Site	Discoverer(s)	Category	Diam.	Ref
113001	2002 RT_{38}	—	September 5, 2002	Socorro	LINEAR	·	2.8 km	MPC · JPL
113002	2002 RW_{38}	—	September 5, 2002	Anderson Mesa	LONEOS	·	4.9 km	MPC · JPL
113003	2002 RY_{38}	—	September 5, 2002	Anderson Mesa	LONEOS	SUL	4.1 km	MPC · JPL
113004	2002 RD_{39}	—	September 5, 2002	Anderson Mesa	LONEOS	NYS	1.7 km	MPC · JPL
113005	2002 RF_{39}	—	September 5, 2002	Anderson Mesa	LONEOS	·	3.8 km	MPC · JPL
113006	2002 RG_{39}	—	September 5, 2002	Anderson Mesa	LONEOS	GEF	2.8 km	MPC · JPL
113007	2002 RJ_{39}	—	September 5, 2002	Socorro	LINEAR	EOS	4.2 km	MPC · JPL
113008	2002 RQ_{39}	—	September 5, 2002	Socorro	LINEAR	·	3.8 km	MPC · JPL
113009	2002 RY_{39}	—	September 5, 2002	Socorro	LINEAR	·	1.7 km	MPC · JPL
113010	2002 RZ_{39}	—	September 5, 2002	Socorro	LINEAR	·	1.9 km	MPC · JPL
113011	2002 RL_{40}	—	September 5, 2002	Socorro	LINEAR	·	4.0 km	MPC · JPL
113012	2002 RP_{40}	—	September 5, 2002	Socorro	LINEAR	·	7.6 km	MPC · JPL
113013	2002 RS_{40}	—	September 5, 2002	Socorro	LINEAR	·	5.9 km	MPC · JPL
113014	2002 RG_{41}	—	September 5, 2002	Socorro	LINEAR	·	3.6 km	MPC · JPL
113015	2002 RN_{41}	—	September 5, 2002	Socorro	LINEAR	·	3.7 km	MPC · JPL
113016	2002 RO_{41}	—	September 5, 2002	Socorro	LINEAR	·	2.9 km	MPC · JPL
113017	2002 RK_{42}	—	September 5, 2002	Socorro	LINEAR	·	1.8 km	MPC · JPL
113018	2002 RQ_{42}	—	September 5, 2002	Socorro	LINEAR	·	3.4 km	MPC · JPL
113019	2002 RW_{42}	—	September 5, 2002	Socorro	LINEAR	NYS	2.4 km	MPC · JPL
113020	2002 RJ_{43}	—	September 5, 2002	Socorro	LINEAR	NYS	2.2 km	MPC · JPL
113021	2002 RO_{43}	—	September 5, 2002	Socorro	LINEAR	KOR	3.4 km	MPC · JPL
113022	2002 RB_{44}	—	September 5, 2002	Socorro	LINEAR	·	2.3 km	MPC · JPL
113023	2002 RU_{44}	—	September 5, 2002	Socorro	LINEAR	·	1.7 km	MPC · JPL
113024	2002 RW_{44}	—	September 5, 2002	Socorro	LINEAR	·	6.6 km	MPC · JPL
113025	2002 RK_{45}	—	September 5, 2002	Socorro	LINEAR	·	3.8 km	MPC · JPL
113026	2002 RR_{45}	—	September 5, 2002	Socorro	LINEAR	KOR	2.9 km	MPC · JPL
113027	2002 RH_{46}	—	September 5, 2002	Socorro	LINEAR	NYS	1.8 km	MPC · JPL
113028	2002 RL_{46}	—	September 5, 2002	Socorro	LINEAR	·	2.9 km	MPC · JPL
113029	2002 RZ_{46}	—	September 5, 2002	Socorro	LINEAR	·	1.3 km	MPC · JPL
113030	2002 RF_{47}	—	September 5, 2002	Socorro	LINEAR	·	1.9 km	MPC · JPL
113031	2002 RL_{47}	—	September 5, 2002	Socorro	LINEAR	·	2.0 km	MPC · JPL
113032	2002 RH_{48}	—	September 5, 2002	Socorro	LINEAR	(2076)	1.7 km	MPC · JPL
113033	2002 RL_{48}	—	September 5, 2002	Socorro	LINEAR	·	2.5 km	MPC · JPL
113034	2002 RM_{48}	—	September 5, 2002	Socorro	LINEAR	NYS	1.9 km	MPC · JPL
113035	2002 RN_{48}	—	September 5, 2002	Socorro	LINEAR	·	6.6 km	MPC · JPL
113036	2002 RR_{48}	—	September 5, 2002	Socorro	LINEAR	·	2.3 km	MPC · JPL
113037	2002 RS_{48}	—	September 5, 2002	Socorro	LINEAR	·	5.8 km	MPC · JPL
113038	2002 RG_{49}	—	September 5, 2002	Socorro	LINEAR	·	1.9 km	MPC · JPL
113039	2002 RH_{49}	—	September 5, 2002	Socorro	LINEAR	·	1.7 km	MPC · JPL
113040	2002 RL_{49}	—	September 5, 2002	Socorro	LINEAR	·	2.4 km	MPC · JPL
113041	2002 RS_{49}	—	September 5, 2002	Socorro	LINEAR	·	3.2 km	MPC · JPL
113042	2002 RO_{50}	—	September 5, 2002	Socorro	LINEAR	NYS ·	2.9 km	MPC · JPL
113043	2002 RR_{50}	—	September 5, 2002	Socorro	LINEAR	MAS	1.6 km	MPC · JPL
113044	2002 RJ_{51}	—	September 5, 2002	Socorro	LINEAR	·	4.3 km	MPC · JPL
113045	2002 RM_{51}	—	September 5, 2002	Socorro	LINEAR	·	2.5 km	MPC · JPL
113046	2002 RR_{51}	—	September 5, 2002	Socorro	LINEAR	(5)	2.4 km	MPC · JPL
113047	2002 RW_{51}	—	September 5, 2002	Socorro	LINEAR	·	8.6 km	MPC · JPL
113048	2002 RY_{51}	—	September 5, 2002	Socorro	LINEAR	·	3.1 km	MPC · JPL
113049	2002 RM_{52}	—	September 5, 2002	Socorro	LINEAR	KOR	3.1 km	MPC · JPL
113050	2002 RR_{52}	—	September 5, 2002	Socorro	LINEAR	NYS	1.7 km	MPC · JPL
113051	2002 RQ_{53}	—	September 5, 2002	Socorro	LINEAR	MRX	1.9 km	MPC · JPL
113052	2002 RU_{53}	—	September 5, 2002	Socorro	LINEAR	·	3.4 km	MPC · JPL
113053	2002 RW_{53}	—	September 5, 2002	Socorro	LINEAR	·	1.7 km	MPC · JPL
113054	2002 RO_{54}	—	September 5, 2002	Socorro	LINEAR	·	7.0 km	MPC · JPL
113055	2002 RQ_{54}	—	September 5, 2002	Socorro	LINEAR	·	2.7 km	MPC · JPL
113056	2002 RL_{55}	—	September 5, 2002	Anderson Mesa	LONEOS	·	3.0 km	MPC · JPL
113057	2002 RM_{55}	—	September 5, 2002	Anderson Mesa	LONEOS	·	1.9 km	MPC · JPL
113058	2002 RY_{55}	—	September 5, 2002	Anderson Mesa	LONEOS	ADE	5.1 km	MPC · JPL
113059	2002 RF_{56}	—	September 5, 2002	Anderson Mesa	LONEOS	HYG	5.6 km	MPC · JPL
113060	2002 RE_{57}	—	September 5, 2002	Anderson Mesa	LONEOS	HYG	5.8 km	MPC · JPL
113061	2002 RA_{58}	—	September 5, 2002	Anderson Mesa	LONEOS	EOS	3.7 km	MPC · JPL
113062	2002 RW_{58}	—	September 5, 2002	Anderson Mesa	LONEOS	EOS	3.4 km	MPC · JPL
113063	2002 RF_{59}	—	September 5, 2002	Anderson Mesa	LONEOS	·	3.4 km	MPC · JPL
113064	2002 RU_{59}	—	September 5, 2002	Socorro	LINEAR	KON	3.8 km	MPC · JPL
113065	2002 RB_{60}	—	September 5, 2002	Anderson Mesa	LONEOS	WIT	2.3 km	MPC · JPL
113066	2002 RK_{60}	—	September 5, 2002	Socorro	LINEAR	·	2.1 km	MPC · JPL
113067	2002 RN_{60}	—	September 5, 2002	Socorro	LINEAR	KOR	3.7 km	MPC · JPL
113068	2002 RS_{60}	—	September 5, 2002	Anderson Mesa	LONEOS	·	1.5 km	MPC · JPL
113069	2002 RM_{61}	—	September 5, 2002	Socorro	LINEAR	·	5.1 km	MPC · JPL
113070	2002 RN_{61}	—	September 5, 2002	Socorro	LINEAR	·	6.6 km	MPC · JPL
113071	2002 RK_{62}	—	September 5, 2002	Socorro	LINEAR	·	1.7 km	MPC · JPL
113072	2002 RM_{62}	—	September 5, 2002	Socorro	LINEAR	·	1.9 km	MPC · JPL
113073	2002 RO_{62}	—	September 5, 2002	Socorro	LINEAR	·	3.6 km	MPC · JPL
113074	2002 RP_{62}	—	September 5, 2002	Socorro	LINEAR	·	2.4 km	MPC · JPL
113075	2002 RB_{63}	—	September 5, 2002	Socorro	LINEAR	·	4.7 km	MPC · JPL
113076	2002 RN_{63}	—	September 5, 2002	Socorro	LINEAR	·	1.5 km	MPC · JPL
113077	2002 RR_{63}	—	September 5, 2002	Socorro	LINEAR	EOS	3.6 km	MPC · JPL
113078	2002 RU_{63}	—	September 5, 2002	Socorro	LINEAR	RAF	1.6 km	MPC · JPL
113079	2002 RD_{64}	—	September 5, 2002	Socorro	LINEAR	(5)	2.0 km	MPC · JPL
113080	2002 RP_{64}	—	September 5, 2002	Socorro	LINEAR	(18466)	4.3 km	MPC · JPL
113081	2002 RU_{64}	—	September 5, 2002	Socorro	LINEAR	·	5.6 km	MPC · JPL
113082	2002 RW_{64}	—	September 5, 2002	Socorro	LINEAR	·	4.1 km	MPC · JPL
113083	2002 RC_{65}	—	September 5, 2002	Socorro	LINEAR	·	7.3 km	MPC · JPL
113084	2002 RG_{65}	—	September 5, 2002	Socorro	LINEAR	·	3.7 km	MPC · JPL
113085	2002 RA_{66}	—	September 5, 2002	Socorro	LINEAR	EOS	4.5 km	MPC · JPL
113086	2002 RQ_{67}	—	September 3, 2002	Palomar	NEAT	EOS	5.3 km	MPC · JPL
113087	2002 RE_{69}	—	September 4, 2002	Anderson Mesa	LONEOS	·	3.3 km	MPC · JPL
113088	2002 RA_{70}	—	September 4, 2002	Anderson Mesa	LONEOS	·	3.1 km	MPC · JPL
113089	2002 RR_{70}	—	September 4, 2002	Palomar	NEAT	KON	3.6 km	MPC · JPL
113090	2002 RK_{71}	—	September 4, 2002	Palomar	NEAT	EOS	4.6 km	MPC · JPL
113091	2002 RO_{71}	—	September 5, 2002	Anderson Mesa	LONEOS	·	2.7 km	MPC · JPL
113092	2002 RT_{71}	—	September 5, 2002	Socorro	LINEAR	·	9.1 km	MPC · JPL
113093	2002 RM_{72}	—	September 5, 2002	Socorro	LINEAR	·	2.2 km	MPC · JPL
113094	2002 RT_{72}	—	September 5, 2002	Socorro	LINEAR	·	3.0 km	MPC · JPL
113095	2002 RU_{72}	—	September 5, 2002	Socorro	LINEAR	·	2.6 km	MPC · JPL
113096	2002 RO_{73}	—	September 5, 2002	Socorro	LINEAR	EOS	3.7 km	MPC · JPL
113097	2002 RK_{74}	—	September 5, 2002	Socorro	LINEAR	·	1.5 km	MPC · JPL
113098	2002 RV_{74}	—	September 5, 2002	Socorro	LINEAR	THM	3.4 km	MPC · JPL
113099	2002 RX_{75}	—	September 5, 2002	Socorro	LINEAR	KOR	3.1 km	MPC · JPL
113100	2002 RC_{76}	—	September 5, 2002	Socorro	LINEAR	·	3.2 km	MPC · JPL

== 113101–113200 ==
back to top

Designation			Discovery			Properties		Ref
Permanent	Provisional	Named after	Date	Site	Discoverer(s)	Category	Diam.	Ref
113101	2002 RO_{76}	—	September 5, 2002	Socorro	LINEAR	·	4.9 km	MPC · JPL
113102	2002 RR_{76}	—	September 5, 2002	Socorro	LINEAR	·	2.7 km	MPC · JPL
113103	2002 RS_{76}	—	September 5, 2002	Socorro	LINEAR	MAS	1.3 km	MPC · JPL
113104	2002 RT_{76}	—	September 5, 2002	Socorro	LINEAR	ADE	3.7 km	MPC · JPL
113105	2002 RV_{76}	—	September 5, 2002	Socorro	LINEAR	NYS	1.7 km	MPC · JPL
113106	2002 RD_{77}	—	September 5, 2002	Socorro	LINEAR	·	3.3 km	MPC · JPL
113107	2002 RM_{77}	—	September 5, 2002	Socorro	LINEAR	·	3.1 km	MPC · JPL
113108	2002 RS_{77}	—	September 5, 2002	Socorro	LINEAR	·	3.7 km	MPC · JPL
113109	2002 RB_{78}	—	September 5, 2002	Socorro	LINEAR	·	3.7 km	MPC · JPL
113110	2002 RH_{78}	—	September 5, 2002	Socorro	LINEAR	NYS	2.1 km	MPC · JPL
113111	2002 RY_{78}	—	September 5, 2002	Socorro	LINEAR	EUN	3.4 km	MPC · JPL
113112	2002 RD_{79}	—	September 5, 2002	Socorro	LINEAR	EOS	5.1 km	MPC · JPL
113113	2002 RH_{79}	—	September 5, 2002	Socorro	LINEAR	·	3.4 km	MPC · JPL
113114	2002 RK_{79}	—	September 5, 2002	Socorro	LINEAR	WIT	1.8 km	MPC · JPL
113115	2002 RQ_{79}	—	September 5, 2002	Socorro	LINEAR	·	2.0 km	MPC · JPL
113116	2002 RC_{80}	—	September 5, 2002	Socorro	LINEAR	NYS	2.8 km	MPC · JPL
113117	2002 RF_{80}	—	September 5, 2002	Socorro	LINEAR	THM	5.7 km	MPC · JPL
113118	2002 RP_{80}	—	September 5, 2002	Socorro	LINEAR	·	2.6 km	MPC · JPL
113119	2002 RS_{80}	—	September 5, 2002	Socorro	LINEAR	·	1.1 km	MPC · JPL
113120	2002 RH_{81}	—	September 5, 2002	Socorro	LINEAR	·	4.9 km	MPC · JPL
113121	2002 RM_{81}	—	September 5, 2002	Socorro	LINEAR	·	2.7 km	MPC · JPL
113122	2002 RP_{81}	—	September 5, 2002	Socorro	LINEAR	·	3.9 km	MPC · JPL
113123	2002 RQ_{81}	—	September 5, 2002	Socorro	LINEAR	·	1.7 km	MPC · JPL
113124	2002 RV_{81}	—	September 5, 2002	Socorro	LINEAR	·	1.4 km	MPC · JPL
113125	2002 RA_{82}	—	September 5, 2002	Socorro	LINEAR	EUN	2.4 km	MPC · JPL
113126	2002 RK_{82}	—	September 5, 2002	Socorro	LINEAR	THM	5.9 km	MPC · JPL
113127	2002 RD_{83}	—	September 5, 2002	Socorro	LINEAR	·	3.3 km	MPC · JPL
113128	2002 RR_{83}	—	September 5, 2002	Socorro	LINEAR	·	3.5 km	MPC · JPL
113129	2002 RZ_{83}	—	September 5, 2002	Socorro	LINEAR	NEM	4.1 km	MPC · JPL
113130	2002 RA_{85}	—	September 5, 2002	Socorro	LINEAR	·	5.6 km	MPC · JPL
113131	2002 RK_{86}	—	September 5, 2002	Socorro	LINEAR	·	6.8 km	MPC · JPL
113132	2002 RM_{86}	—	September 5, 2002	Socorro	LINEAR	·	1.5 km	MPC · JPL
113133	2002 RV_{86}	—	September 5, 2002	Socorro	LINEAR	VER	6.0 km	MPC · JPL
113134	2002 RD_{87}	—	September 5, 2002	Socorro	LINEAR	·	3.5 km	MPC · JPL
113135	2002 RF_{87}	—	September 5, 2002	Socorro	LINEAR	·	4.6 km	MPC · JPL
113136	2002 RO_{87}	—	September 5, 2002	Socorro	LINEAR	NYS	1.5 km	MPC · JPL
113137	2002 RX_{87}	—	September 5, 2002	Socorro	LINEAR	NYS	2.1 km	MPC · JPL
113138	2002 RZ_{87}	—	September 5, 2002	Socorro	LINEAR	·	1.7 km	MPC · JPL
113139	2002 RC_{88}	—	September 5, 2002	Socorro	LINEAR	·	1.5 km	MPC · JPL
113140	2002 RR_{89}	—	September 5, 2002	Socorro	LINEAR	·	1.3 km	MPC · JPL
113141	2002 RZ_{89}	—	September 5, 2002	Socorro	LINEAR	·	4.0 km	MPC · JPL
113142	2002 RB_{90}	—	September 5, 2002	Socorro	LINEAR	·	3.7 km	MPC · JPL
113143	2002 RT_{92}	—	September 5, 2002	Socorro	LINEAR	·	5.4 km	MPC · JPL
113144	2002 RZ_{92}	—	September 5, 2002	Socorro	LINEAR	·	8.7 km	MPC · JPL
113145	2002 RK_{93}	—	September 5, 2002	Anderson Mesa	LONEOS	·	6.4 km	MPC · JPL
113146	2002 RX_{93}	—	September 5, 2002	Anderson Mesa	LONEOS	(16286)	3.5 km	MPC · JPL
113147	2002 RR_{94}	—	September 5, 2002	Socorro	LINEAR	·	3.3 km	MPC · JPL
113148	2002 RZ_{94}	—	September 5, 2002	Socorro	LINEAR	·	2.0 km	MPC · JPL
113149	2002 RC_{95}	—	September 5, 2002	Socorro	LINEAR	KON	4.7 km	MPC · JPL
113150	2002 RS_{95}	—	September 5, 2002	Socorro	LINEAR	·	3.0 km	MPC · JPL
113151	2002 RX_{95}	—	September 5, 2002	Socorro	LINEAR	·	3.3 km	MPC · JPL
113152	2002 RC_{96}	—	September 5, 2002	Socorro	LINEAR	·	2.4 km	MPC · JPL
113153	2002 RF_{96}	—	September 5, 2002	Socorro	LINEAR	NYS	1.9 km	MPC · JPL
113154	2002 RJ_{96}	—	September 5, 2002	Socorro	LINEAR	·	3.4 km	MPC · JPL
113155	2002 RZ_{96}	—	September 5, 2002	Socorro	LINEAR	·	2.3 km	MPC · JPL
113156	2002 RA_{97}	—	September 5, 2002	Socorro	LINEAR	·	3.4 km	MPC · JPL
113157	2002 RU_{97}	—	September 5, 2002	Socorro	LINEAR	EOS	3.7 km	MPC · JPL
113158	2002 RV_{97}	—	September 5, 2002	Socorro	LINEAR	NYS	1.5 km	MPC · JPL
113159	2002 RW_{97}	—	September 5, 2002	Socorro	LINEAR	·	1.4 km	MPC · JPL
113160	2002 RC_{98}	—	September 5, 2002	Socorro	LINEAR	·	4.6 km	MPC · JPL
113161	2002 RF_{98}	—	September 5, 2002	Socorro	LINEAR	·	2.3 km	MPC · JPL
113162	2002 RA_{99}	—	September 5, 2002	Socorro	LINEAR	EUN	4.1 km	MPC · JPL
113163	2002 RM_{99}	—	September 5, 2002	Socorro	LINEAR	·	4.9 km	MPC · JPL
113164	2002 RS_{99}	—	September 5, 2002	Socorro	LINEAR	·	1.8 km	MPC · JPL
113165	2002 RB_{100}	—	September 5, 2002	Socorro	LINEAR	·	4.1 km	MPC · JPL
113166	2002 RV_{100}	—	September 5, 2002	Socorro	LINEAR	·	1.7 km	MPC · JPL
113167	2002 RY_{100}	—	September 5, 2002	Socorro	LINEAR	·	3.5 km	MPC · JPL
113168	2002 RH_{101}	—	September 5, 2002	Socorro	LINEAR	·	7.6 km	MPC · JPL
113169	2002 RP_{101}	—	September 5, 2002	Socorro	LINEAR	·	1.4 km	MPC · JPL
113170	2002 RZ_{101}	—	September 5, 2002	Socorro	LINEAR	·	4.3 km	MPC · JPL
113171	2002 RG_{102}	—	September 5, 2002	Socorro	LINEAR	·	5.3 km	MPC · JPL
113172	2002 RN_{102}	—	September 5, 2002	Socorro	LINEAR	·	4.7 km	MPC · JPL
113173	2002 RS_{102}	—	September 5, 2002	Socorro	LINEAR	EOS	5.9 km	MPC · JPL
113174	2002 RU_{102}	—	September 5, 2002	Socorro	LINEAR	·	3.9 km	MPC · JPL
113175	2002 RW_{102}	—	September 5, 2002	Socorro	LINEAR	·	3.0 km	MPC · JPL
113176	2002 RY_{102}	—	September 5, 2002	Socorro	LINEAR	EUN	3.5 km	MPC · JPL
113177	2002 RD_{103}	—	September 5, 2002	Socorro	LINEAR	·	3.0 km	MPC · JPL
113178	2002 RG_{103}	—	September 5, 2002	Socorro	LINEAR	HYG	4.8 km	MPC · JPL
113179	2002 RH_{104}	—	September 5, 2002	Socorro	LINEAR	·	2.6 km	MPC · JPL
113180	2002 RS_{105}	—	September 5, 2002	Socorro	LINEAR	·	2.3 km	MPC · JPL
113181	2002 RU_{105}	—	September 5, 2002	Socorro	LINEAR	·	2.9 km	MPC · JPL
113182	2002 RV_{105}	—	September 5, 2002	Socorro	LINEAR	·	5.6 km	MPC · JPL
113183	2002 RZ_{105}	—	September 5, 2002	Socorro	LINEAR	V	1.3 km	MPC · JPL
113184	2002 RE_{106}	—	September 5, 2002	Socorro	LINEAR	·	1.5 km	MPC · JPL
113185	2002 RF_{106}	—	September 5, 2002	Socorro	LINEAR	(18466)	5.5 km	MPC · JPL
113186	2002 RG_{106}	—	September 5, 2002	Socorro	LINEAR	·	1.7 km	MPC · JPL
113187	2002 RN_{106}	—	September 5, 2002	Socorro	LINEAR	EOS	6.5 km	MPC · JPL
113188	2002 RP_{106}	—	September 5, 2002	Socorro	LINEAR	EUN	2.2 km	MPC · JPL
113189	2002 RR_{106}	—	September 5, 2002	Socorro	LINEAR	·	5.2 km	MPC · JPL
113190	2002 RV_{106}	—	September 5, 2002	Socorro	LINEAR	·	2.2 km	MPC · JPL
113191	2002 RJ_{107}	—	September 5, 2002	Socorro	LINEAR	·	8.0 km	MPC · JPL
113192	2002 RT_{107}	—	September 5, 2002	Socorro	LINEAR	(5)	2.1 km	MPC · JPL
113193	2002 RX_{107}	—	September 5, 2002	Socorro	LINEAR	·	4.9 km	MPC · JPL
113194	2002 RY_{107}	—	September 5, 2002	Socorro	LINEAR	·	4.4 km	MPC · JPL
113195	2002 RE_{108}	—	September 5, 2002	Socorro	LINEAR	·	5.9 km	MPC · JPL
113196	2002 RJ_{108}	—	September 5, 2002	Socorro	LINEAR	526	4.1 km	MPC · JPL
113197	2002 RJ_{110}	—	September 6, 2002	Socorro	LINEAR	·	3.5 km	MPC · JPL
113198	2002 RE_{111}	—	September 6, 2002	Socorro	LINEAR	·	7.5 km	MPC · JPL
113199	2002 RM_{111}	—	September 6, 2002	Socorro	LINEAR	·	1.9 km	MPC · JPL
113200	2002 RP_{111}	—	September 6, 2002	Socorro	LINEAR	·	2.9 km	MPC · JPL

== 113201–113300 ==
back to top

Designation			Discovery			Properties		Ref
Permanent	Provisional	Named after	Date	Site	Discoverer(s)	Category	Diam.	Ref
113201	2002 RS_{111}	—	September 6, 2002	Socorro	LINEAR	EUN	3.6 km	MPC · JPL
113202 Kisslászló	2002 RY_{111}	Kisslászló	September 7, 2002	Piszkéstető	K. Sárneczky	·	5.4 km	MPC · JPL
113203 Szabó	2002 RC_{112}	Szabó	September 7, 2002	Piszkéstető	K. Sárneczky	·	1.8 km	MPC · JPL
113204	2002 RX_{112}	—	September 5, 2002	Socorro	LINEAR	·	4.0 km	MPC · JPL
113205	2002 RB_{113}	—	September 7, 2002	Farra d'Isonzo	Farra d'Isonzo	·	2.7 km	MPC · JPL
113206	2002 RV_{113}	—	September 5, 2002	Socorro	LINEAR	·	5.0 km	MPC · JPL
113207	2002 RM_{114}	—	September 5, 2002	Socorro	LINEAR	(5)	3.7 km	MPC · JPL
113208 Lea	2002 RR_{114}	Lea	September 5, 2002	Campo Imperatore	F. Bernardi	·	3.1 km	MPC · JPL
113209	2002 RU_{114}	—	September 6, 2002	Socorro	LINEAR	·	5.3 km	MPC · JPL
113210 Petrfatka	2002 RF_{117}	Petrfatka	September 7, 2002	Ondřejov	P. Pravec, P. Kušnirák	·	2.6 km	MPC · JPL
113211	2002 RK_{117}	—	September 7, 2002	Socorro	LINEAR	·	1.9 km	MPC · JPL
113212	2002 RZ_{117}	—	September 3, 2002	Palomar	NEAT	·	6.1 km	MPC · JPL
113213 Marcoolmo	2002 RM_{118}	Marcoolmo	September 6, 2002	Campo Imperatore	F. Bernardi	·	4.7 km	MPC · JPL
113214 Vinkó	2002 RT_{118}	Vinkó	September 9, 2002	Piszkéstető	K. Sárneczky	EOS	3.0 km	MPC · JPL
113215	2002 RW_{118}	—	September 9, 2002	Powell	Powell	·	1.5 km	MPC · JPL
113216	2002 RF_{119}	—	September 7, 2002	Socorro	LINEAR	EOS	4.5 km	MPC · JPL
113217	2002 RQ_{119}	—	September 6, 2002	Socorro	LINEAR	·	2.8 km	MPC · JPL
113218	2002 RT_{119}	—	September 7, 2002	Socorro	LINEAR	·	5.3 km	MPC · JPL
113219 Thomasmazzi	2002 RU_{119}	Thomasmazzi	September 7, 2002	Campo Imperatore	CINEOS	·	4.4 km	MPC · JPL
113220	2002 RZ_{119}	—	September 8, 2002	Haleakala	NEAT	·	6.9 km	MPC · JPL
113221	2002 RN_{120}	—	September 5, 2002	Haleakala	NEAT	·	2.0 km	MPC · JPL
113222	2002 RW_{120}	—	September 7, 2002	Socorro	LINEAR	·	2.5 km	MPC · JPL
113223	2002 RK_{121}	—	September 7, 2002	Socorro	LINEAR	·	5.7 km	MPC · JPL
113224	2002 RN_{121}	—	September 7, 2002	Socorro	LINEAR	HIL · 3:2	11 km	MPC · JPL
113225	2002 RV_{121}	—	September 7, 2002	Socorro	LINEAR	·	4.4 km	MPC · JPL
113226	2002 RX_{121}	—	September 8, 2002	Haleakala	NEAT	EOS	4.2 km	MPC · JPL
113227	2002 RB_{122}	—	September 8, 2002	Haleakala	NEAT	EOS	4.0 km	MPC · JPL
113228	2002 RN_{122}	—	September 8, 2002	Haleakala	NEAT	·	5.3 km	MPC · JPL
113229	2002 RX_{122}	—	September 8, 2002	Haleakala	NEAT	EOS	4.2 km	MPC · JPL
113230	2002 RA_{123}	—	September 8, 2002	Haleakala	NEAT	·	5.1 km	MPC · JPL
113231	2002 RB_{123}	—	September 8, 2002	Haleakala	NEAT	·	7.8 km	MPC · JPL
113232	2002 RC_{123}	—	September 8, 2002	Haleakala	NEAT	RAF	1.8 km	MPC · JPL
113233	2002 RH_{123}	—	September 8, 2002	Haleakala	NEAT	·	7.7 km	MPC · JPL
113234	2002 RJ_{123}	—	September 8, 2002	Haleakala	NEAT	·	1.9 km	MPC · JPL
113235	2002 RX_{124}	—	September 9, 2002	Haleakala	NEAT	·	3.8 km	MPC · JPL
113236	2002 RS_{125}	—	September 4, 2002	Palomar	NEAT	·	2.5 km	MPC · JPL
113237 Samucavicchioli	2002 RH_{126}	Samucavicchioli	September 8, 2002	Campo Imperatore	CINEOS	·	2.4 km	MPC · JPL
113238	2002 RN_{126}	—	September 9, 2002	Palomar	NEAT	·	2.5 km	MPC · JPL
113239	2002 RQ_{126}	—	September 9, 2002	Palomar	NEAT	V	1.2 km	MPC · JPL
113240	2002 RR_{126}	—	September 9, 2002	Palomar	NEAT	EOS	5.3 km	MPC · JPL
113241	2002 RY_{126}	—	September 10, 2002	Palomar	NEAT	HNS	2.2 km	MPC · JPL
113242	2002 RB_{127}	—	September 10, 2002	Palomar	NEAT	·	7.7 km	MPC · JPL
113243	2002 RP_{127}	—	September 10, 2002	Palomar	NEAT	·	5.5 km	MPC · JPL
113244	2002 RB_{129}	—	September 10, 2002	Haleakala	NEAT	V	920 m	MPC · JPL
113245	2002 RN_{130}	—	September 10, 2002	Palomar	NEAT	·	4.5 km	MPC · JPL
113246	2002 RV_{130}	—	September 11, 2002	Palomar	NEAT	(2076)	1.3 km	MPC · JPL
113247	2002 RV_{131}	—	September 11, 2002	Palomar	NEAT	·	2.5 km	MPC · JPL
113248	2002 RG_{133}	—	September 9, 2002	Haleakala	NEAT	·	2.6 km	MPC · JPL
113249	2002 RJ_{133}	—	September 9, 2002	Haleakala	NEAT	·	3.7 km	MPC · JPL
113250	2002 RP_{133}	—	September 10, 2002	Palomar	NEAT	·	2.1 km	MPC · JPL
113251	2002 RQ_{133}	—	September 10, 2002	Palomar	NEAT	·	3.1 km	MPC · JPL
113252	2002 RF_{134}	—	September 10, 2002	Palomar	NEAT	·	8.5 km	MPC · JPL
113253	2002 RH_{134}	—	September 10, 2002	Palomar	NEAT	·	5.3 km	MPC · JPL
113254	2002 RW_{134}	—	September 10, 2002	Palomar	NEAT	slow	8.4 km	MPC · JPL
113255	2002 RA_{137}	—	September 12, 2002	Haleakala	NEAT	·	4.2 km	MPC · JPL
113256 Prüm	2002 RF_{138}	Prüm	September 13, 2002	Hoher List	E. W. Elst	·	5.2 km	MPC · JPL
113257	2002 RD_{139}	—	September 10, 2002	Palomar	NEAT	EOS	4.0 km	MPC · JPL
113258	2002 RB_{140}	—	September 10, 2002	Palomar	NEAT	·	4.4 km	MPC · JPL
113259	2002 RF_{140}	—	September 10, 2002	Palomar	NEAT	·	2.7 km	MPC · JPL
113260	2002 RG_{141}	—	September 10, 2002	Palomar	NEAT	·	10 km	MPC · JPL
113261	2002 RH_{141}	—	September 10, 2002	Palomar	NEAT	·	3.9 km	MPC · JPL
113262	2002 RU_{142}	—	September 11, 2002	Palomar	NEAT	EOS	4.7 km	MPC · JPL
113263	2002 RU_{144}	—	September 11, 2002	Palomar	NEAT	KOR	2.5 km	MPC · JPL
113264	2002 RC_{150}	—	September 11, 2002	Haleakala	NEAT	·	3.9 km	MPC · JPL
113265	2002 RK_{150}	—	September 11, 2002	Haleakala	NEAT	·	2.4 km	MPC · JPL
113266	2002 RM_{150}	—	September 11, 2002	Haleakala	NEAT	EOS	4.4 km	MPC · JPL
113267	2002 RT_{150}	—	September 12, 2002	Palomar	NEAT	SYL · CYB	10 km	MPC · JPL
113268	2002 RE_{151}	—	September 12, 2002	Palomar	NEAT	EOS	3.6 km	MPC · JPL
113269	2002 RN_{151}	—	September 12, 2002	Palomar	NEAT	·	4.8 km	MPC · JPL
113270	2002 RN_{152}	—	September 12, 2002	Palomar	NEAT	VER	7.2 km	MPC · JPL
113271	2002 RE_{153}	—	September 12, 2002	Palomar	NEAT	GEF	2.1 km	MPC · JPL
113272	2002 RP_{154}	—	September 10, 2002	Haleakala	NEAT	·	2.0 km	MPC · JPL
113273	2002 RR_{154}	—	September 10, 2002	Haleakala	NEAT	·	6.1 km	MPC · JPL
113274	2002 RY_{154}	—	September 10, 2002	Haleakala	NEAT	EOS	4.1 km	MPC · JPL
113275	2002 RA_{155}	—	September 10, 2002	Haleakala	NEAT	EOS	3.8 km	MPC · JPL
113276	2002 RB_{158}	—	September 11, 2002	Palomar	NEAT	·	6.7 km	MPC · JPL
113277	2002 RE_{159}	—	September 11, 2002	Palomar	NEAT	·	2.6 km	MPC · JPL
113278	2002 RM_{159}	—	September 11, 2002	Haleakala	NEAT	·	2.3 km	MPC · JPL
113279	2002 RN_{159}	—	September 11, 2002	Haleakala	NEAT	HYG	6.1 km	MPC · JPL
113280	2002 RQ_{159}	—	September 11, 2002	Haleakala	NEAT	KOR	2.3 km	MPC · JPL
113281	2002 RA_{160}	—	September 12, 2002	Palomar	NEAT	THM	4.1 km	MPC · JPL
113282	2002 RU_{161}	—	September 12, 2002	Palomar	NEAT	·	6.8 km	MPC · JPL
113283	2002 RT_{162}	—	September 12, 2002	Palomar	NEAT	VER	7.4 km	MPC · JPL
113284	2002 RF_{164}	—	September 12, 2002	Palomar	NEAT	·	1.8 km	MPC · JPL
113285	2002 RQ_{164}	—	September 12, 2002	Palomar	NEAT	·	2.1 km	MPC · JPL
113286	2002 RW_{166}	—	September 13, 2002	Socorro	LINEAR	·	6.4 km	MPC · JPL
113287	2002 RH_{170}	—	September 13, 2002	Palomar	NEAT	·	1.9 km	MPC · JPL
113288	2002 RP_{171}	—	September 13, 2002	Socorro	LINEAR	·	2.1 km	MPC · JPL
113289	2002 RR_{171}	—	September 13, 2002	Socorro	LINEAR	·	4.0 km	MPC · JPL
113290	2002 RJ_{172}	—	September 13, 2002	Anderson Mesa	LONEOS	·	3.7 km	MPC · JPL
113291	2002 RT_{172}	—	September 13, 2002	Palomar	NEAT	·	5.5 km	MPC · JPL
113292	2002 RB_{173}	—	September 13, 2002	Socorro	LINEAR	MAR	2.4 km	MPC · JPL
113293	2002 RF_{173}	—	September 13, 2002	Socorro	LINEAR	·	3.9 km	MPC · JPL
113294	2002 RL_{175}	—	September 13, 2002	Palomar	NEAT	·	4.9 km	MPC · JPL
113295	2002 RA_{176}	—	September 13, 2002	Palomar	NEAT	slow	2.5 km	MPC · JPL
113296	2002 RJ_{177}	—	September 13, 2002	Palomar	NEAT	EOS ·	6.0 km	MPC · JPL
113297	2002 RL_{178}	—	September 14, 2002	Palomar	NEAT	·	2.6 km	MPC · JPL
113298	2002 RQ_{178}	—	September 14, 2002	Palomar	NEAT	·	3.7 km	MPC · JPL
113299	2002 RE_{182}	—	September 11, 2002	Palomar	NEAT	·	12 km	MPC · JPL
113300	2002 RQ_{182}	—	September 11, 2002	Palomar	NEAT	·	7.0 km	MPC · JPL

== 113301–113400 ==
back to top

Designation			Discovery			Properties		Ref
Permanent	Provisional	Named after	Date	Site	Discoverer(s)	Category	Diam.	Ref
113301	2002 RC_{183}	—	September 11, 2002	Palomar	NEAT	·	4.5 km	MPC · JPL
113302	2002 RX_{184}	—	September 12, 2002	Palomar	NEAT	·	2.0 km	MPC · JPL
113303	2002 RC_{185}	—	September 12, 2002	Palomar	NEAT	·	7.5 km	MPC · JPL
113304	2002 RT_{185}	—	September 12, 2002	Palomar	NEAT	·	2.7 km	MPC · JPL
113305	2002 RD_{186}	—	September 12, 2002	Palomar	NEAT	·	5.2 km	MPC · JPL
113306	2002 RQ_{186}	—	September 12, 2002	Palomar	NEAT	·	4.2 km	MPC · JPL
113307	2002 RS_{186}	—	September 12, 2002	Palomar	NEAT	BRA	4.1 km	MPC · JPL
113308	2002 RM_{187}	—	September 11, 2002	Kvistaberg	Uppsala-DLR Asteroid Survey	·	4.1 km	MPC · JPL
113309	2002 RN_{187}	—	September 11, 2002	Kvistaberg	Uppsala-DLR Asteroid Survey	·	1.5 km	MPC · JPL
113310	2002 RT_{187}	—	September 12, 2002	Palomar	NEAT	·	1.1 km	MPC · JPL
113311	2002 RK_{189}	—	September 14, 2002	Palomar	NEAT	·	4.8 km	MPC · JPL
113312	2002 RF_{190}	—	September 14, 2002	Palomar	NEAT	·	920 m	MPC · JPL
113313	2002 RJ_{190}	—	September 14, 2002	Palomar	NEAT	·	1.8 km	MPC · JPL
113314	2002 RT_{193}	—	September 12, 2002	Palomar	NEAT	·	5.9 km	MPC · JPL
113315	2002 RD_{197}	—	September 12, 2002	Haleakala	NEAT	·	2.6 km	MPC · JPL
113316	2002 RX_{199}	—	September 13, 2002	Palomar	NEAT	·	3.0 km	MPC · JPL
113317	2002 RL_{200}	—	September 13, 2002	Palomar	NEAT	SYL · CYB · slow	10 km	MPC · JPL
113318	2002 RX_{200}	—	September 13, 2002	Socorro	LINEAR	·	3.5 km	MPC · JPL
113319	2002 RZ_{200}	—	September 13, 2002	Socorro	LINEAR	·	5.5 km	MPC · JPL
113320	2002 RN_{203}	—	September 14, 2002	Palomar	NEAT	·	3.6 km	MPC · JPL
113321	2002 RE_{204}	—	September 14, 2002	Palomar	NEAT	·	1.7 km	MPC · JPL
113322	2002 RA_{205}	—	September 14, 2002	Haleakala	NEAT	·	2.6 km	MPC · JPL
113323	2002 RF_{205}	—	September 14, 2002	Haleakala	NEAT	·	6.3 km	MPC · JPL
113324	2002 RO_{205}	—	September 14, 2002	Haleakala	NEAT	MAS	1.3 km	MPC · JPL
113325	2002 RQ_{205}	—	September 14, 2002	Haleakala	NEAT	·	3.5 km	MPC · JPL
113326	2002 RT_{205}	—	September 14, 2002	Haleakala	NEAT	·	3.2 km	MPC · JPL
113327	2002 RL_{206}	—	September 14, 2002	Palomar	NEAT	·	2.1 km	MPC · JPL
113328	2002 RR_{207}	—	September 14, 2002	Palomar	NEAT	KOR	2.6 km	MPC · JPL
113329	2002 RS_{207}	—	September 14, 2002	Palomar	NEAT	THM	4.3 km	MPC · JPL
113330	2002 RU_{207}	—	September 14, 2002	Palomar	NEAT	·	3.2 km	MPC · JPL
113331	2002 RN_{209}	—	September 14, 2002	Haleakala	NEAT	THM	3.7 km	MPC · JPL
113332	2002 RP_{209}	—	September 14, 2002	Haleakala	NEAT	·	4.8 km	MPC · JPL
113333 Tyler	2002 RR_{211}	Tyler	September 13, 2002	Goodricke-Pigott	R. A. Tucker	·	4.9 km	MPC · JPL
113334	2002 RE_{213}	—	September 12, 2002	Haleakala	NEAT	(31811)	6.8 km	MPC · JPL
113335	2002 RK_{213}	—	September 13, 2002	Palomar	NEAT	·	2.3 km	MPC · JPL
113336	2002 RC_{214}	—	September 13, 2002	Socorro	LINEAR	·	3.4 km	MPC · JPL
113337	2002 RQ_{214}	—	September 13, 2002	Socorro	LINEAR	EOS ·	7.1 km	MPC · JPL
113338	2002 RD_{215}	—	September 13, 2002	Socorro	LINEAR	PAD	6.3 km	MPC · JPL
113339	2002 RU_{216}	—	September 13, 2002	Haleakala	NEAT	·	3.2 km	MPC · JPL
113340	2002 RE_{217}	—	September 14, 2002	Palomar	NEAT	·	1.3 km	MPC · JPL
113341	2002 RQ_{222}	—	September 15, 2002	Palomar	NEAT	·	2.8 km	MPC · JPL
113342	2002 RS_{222}	—	September 15, 2002	Palomar	NEAT	NEM	3.6 km	MPC · JPL
113343	2002 RE_{226}	—	September 13, 2002	Haleakala	NEAT	·	7.5 km	MPC · JPL
113344	2002 RT_{227}	—	September 14, 2002	Palomar	NEAT	·	4.9 km	MPC · JPL
113345	2002 RY_{229}	—	September 14, 2002	Haleakala	NEAT	·	3.7 km	MPC · JPL
113346	2002 RE_{233}	—	September 14, 2002	Palomar	R. Matson	·	4.8 km	MPC · JPL
113347	2002 RG_{233}	—	September 14, 2002	Palomar	R. Matson	LIX	5.8 km	MPC · JPL
113348	2002 RR_{233}	—	September 14, 2002	Palomar	R. Matson	·	2.0 km	MPC · JPL
113349	2002 RJ_{234}	—	September 15, 2002	Palomar	R. Matson	·	3.6 km	MPC · JPL
113350	2002 RG_{235}	—	September 14, 2002	Palomar	R. Matson	·	2.7 km	MPC · JPL
113351	2002 RH_{235}	—	September 14, 2002	Palomar	R. Matson	·	2.8 km	MPC · JPL
113352	2002 RX_{235}	—	September 14, 2002	Haleakala	R. Matson	·	2.3 km	MPC · JPL
113353	2002 RB_{236}	—	September 9, 2002	Haleakala	R. Matson	·	1.6 km	MPC · JPL
113354	2002 RQ_{237}	—	September 1, 2002	Haleakala	R. Matson	·	1.6 km	MPC · JPL
113355 Gessler	2002 RW_{240}	Gessler	September 14, 2002	Palomar	R. Matson	EOS	2.4 km	MPC · JPL
113356	2002 RO_{244}	—	September 14, 2002	Palomar	NEAT	(5)	1.7 km	MPC · JPL
113357	2002 RN_{245}	—	September 1, 2002	Palomar	NEAT	·	3.5 km	MPC · JPL
113358	2002 RU_{245}	—	September 1, 2002	Palomar	NEAT	·	3.2 km	MPC · JPL
113359	2002 RY_{245}	—	September 1, 2002	Palomar	NEAT	NYS	1.7 km	MPC · JPL
113360	2002 SC_{1}	—	September 26, 2002	Palomar	NEAT	MAS	920 m	MPC · JPL
113361	2002 SH_{1}	—	September 26, 2002	Haleakala	NEAT	·	9.0 km	MPC · JPL
113362	2002 SR_{1}	—	September 26, 2002	Palomar	NEAT	·	2.7 km	MPC · JPL
113363	2002 SS_{1}	—	September 26, 2002	Palomar	NEAT	·	3.5 km	MPC · JPL
113364	2002 SJ_{2}	—	September 26, 2002	Palomar	NEAT	NYS	2.9 km	MPC · JPL
113365	2002 SL_{2}	—	September 26, 2002	Palomar	NEAT	GEF	2.8 km	MPC · JPL
113366	2002 SV_{2}	—	September 27, 2002	Palomar	NEAT	HNS	2.5 km	MPC · JPL
113367	2002 SY_{2}	—	September 27, 2002	Palomar	NEAT	EUP	8.1 km	MPC · JPL
113368	2002 SZ_{2}	—	September 27, 2002	Palomar	NEAT	·	9.5 km	MPC · JPL
113369	2002 SQ_{3}	—	September 26, 2002	Palomar	NEAT	(29841)	1.9 km	MPC · JPL
113370	2002 ST_{3}	—	September 26, 2002	Palomar	NEAT	·	3.0 km	MPC · JPL
113371	2002 SC_{6}	—	September 27, 2002	Palomar	NEAT	·	6.6 km	MPC · JPL
113372	2002 SK_{6}	—	September 27, 2002	Palomar	NEAT	·	1.7 km	MPC · JPL
113373	2002 SS_{6}	—	September 27, 2002	Palomar	NEAT	·	4.2 km	MPC · JPL
113374	2002 SB_{8}	—	September 27, 2002	Palomar	NEAT	·	2.2 km	MPC · JPL
113375	2002 SE_{8}	—	September 27, 2002	Palomar	NEAT	·	3.8 km	MPC · JPL
113376	2002 ST_{8}	—	September 27, 2002	Palomar	NEAT	·	4.3 km	MPC · JPL
113377	2002 SG_{9}	—	September 27, 2002	Palomar	NEAT	·	1.2 km	MPC · JPL
113378	2002 SM_{9}	—	September 27, 2002	Palomar	NEAT	KOR	2.5 km	MPC · JPL
113379	2002 SR_{9}	—	September 27, 2002	Palomar	NEAT	·	2.9 km	MPC · JPL
113380	2002 SN_{10}	—	September 27, 2002	Palomar	NEAT	·	1.7 km	MPC · JPL
113381	2002 SC_{11}	—	September 27, 2002	Palomar	NEAT	MAS	1.7 km	MPC · JPL
113382	2002 SW_{12}	—	September 27, 2002	Palomar	NEAT	·	2.5 km	MPC · JPL
113383	2002 ST_{14}	—	September 27, 2002	Anderson Mesa	LONEOS	·	2.6 km	MPC · JPL
113384	2002 SW_{14}	—	September 27, 2002	Palomar	NEAT	fast	3.6 km	MPC · JPL
113385	2002 SS_{15}	—	September 27, 2002	Palomar	NEAT	·	11 km	MPC · JPL
113386	2002 SV_{15}	—	September 27, 2002	Palomar	NEAT	JUN	3.4 km	MPC · JPL
113387	2002 SH_{16}	—	September 27, 2002	Palomar	NEAT	·	7.6 km	MPC · JPL
113388 Davidmartinez	2002 SS_{16}	Davidmartinez	September 28, 2002	Pla D'Arguines	R. Ferrando	·	5.6 km	MPC · JPL
113389	2002 SF_{17}	—	September 28, 2002	Ondřejov	P. Pravec	·	4.1 km	MPC · JPL
113390 Helvetia	2002 SU_{19}	Helvetia	September 29, 2002	Winterthur	M. Griesser	·	2.2 km	MPC · JPL
113391	2002 SG_{20}	—	September 26, 2002	Palomar	NEAT	·	2.6 km	MPC · JPL
113392	2002 SG_{21}	—	September 26, 2002	Palomar	NEAT	·	3.8 km	MPC · JPL
113393	2002 SJ_{21}	—	September 26, 2002	Palomar	NEAT	·	4.8 km	MPC · JPL
113394 Niebur	2002 SN_{21}	Niebur	September 26, 2002	Palomar	NEAT	·	3.1 km	MPC · JPL
113395 Curtniebur	2002 SZ_{21}	Curtniebur	September 26, 2002	Palomar	NEAT	·	4.3 km	MPC · JPL
113396	2002 SA_{22}	—	September 26, 2002	Palomar	NEAT	·	2.3 km	MPC · JPL
113397	2002 SH_{22}	—	September 26, 2002	Palomar	NEAT	KOR	2.7 km	MPC · JPL
113398	2002 SL_{22}	—	September 26, 2002	Palomar	NEAT	THM	6.2 km	MPC · JPL
113399	2002 SM_{22}	—	September 26, 2002	Palomar	NEAT	·	2.0 km	MPC · JPL
113400	2002 ST_{22}	—	September 26, 2002	Haleakala	NEAT	·	7.1 km	MPC · JPL

== 113401–113500 ==
back to top

Designation			Discovery			Properties		Ref
Permanent	Provisional	Named after	Date	Site	Discoverer(s)	Category	Diam.	Ref
113401	2002 SV_{22}	—	September 26, 2002	Haleakala	NEAT	·	4.7 km	MPC · JPL
113402	2002 SW_{22}	—	September 26, 2002	Haleakala	NEAT	EOS	4.2 km	MPC · JPL
113403	2002 ST_{23}	—	September 27, 2002	Anderson Mesa	LONEOS	T_{j} (2.99) · 3:2	10 km	MPC · JPL
113404	2002 SA_{24}	—	September 27, 2002	Socorro	LINEAR	EUN	3.3 km	MPC · JPL
113405 Itomori	2002 SS_{24}	Itomori	September 28, 2002	Goodricke-Pigott	R. A. Tucker	KRM	4.2 km	MPC · JPL
113406	2002 SU_{24}	—	September 28, 2002	Palomar	NEAT	LUT	8.6 km	MPC · JPL
113407	2002 SZ_{24}	—	September 28, 2002	Haleakala	NEAT	·	4.7 km	MPC · JPL
113408	2002 ST_{25}	—	September 28, 2002	Haleakala	NEAT	·	6.6 km	MPC · JPL
113409	2002 SU_{25}	—	September 28, 2002	Haleakala	NEAT	MAR	2.7 km	MPC · JPL
113410	2002 SY_{25}	—	September 28, 2002	Haleakala	NEAT	(5)	2.2 km	MPC · JPL
113411	2002 SD_{26}	—	September 28, 2002	Haleakala	NEAT	·	4.7 km	MPC · JPL
113412	2002 SG_{26}	—	September 28, 2002	Haleakala	NEAT	PAD	2.8 km	MPC · JPL
113413	2002 SG_{27}	—	September 29, 2002	Haleakala	NEAT	·	2.3 km	MPC · JPL
113414	2002 SS_{27}	—	September 29, 2002	Haleakala	NEAT	·	4.2 km	MPC · JPL
113415 Rauracia	2002 SN_{28}	Rauracia	September 30, 2002	Vicques	M. Ory	T_{j} (2.96) · 3:2	10 km	MPC · JPL
113416	2002 SH_{29}	—	September 28, 2002	Palomar	NEAT	NYS	2.1 km	MPC · JPL
113417	2002 SE_{30}	—	September 28, 2002	Haleakala	NEAT	EOS	3.3 km	MPC · JPL
113418	2002 SJ_{33}	—	September 28, 2002	Haleakala	NEAT	·	3.8 km	MPC · JPL
113419	2002 SM_{33}	—	September 28, 2002	Haleakala	NEAT	AGN	2.9 km	MPC · JPL
113420	2002 SE_{34}	—	September 29, 2002	Haleakala	NEAT	·	2.6 km	MPC · JPL
113421	2002 SK_{34}	—	September 29, 2002	Haleakala	NEAT	·	3.8 km	MPC · JPL
113422	2002 SQ_{36}	—	September 29, 2002	Haleakala	NEAT	VER	5.8 km	MPC · JPL
113423	2002 SS_{36}	—	September 29, 2002	Haleakala	NEAT	MRX	2.0 km	MPC · JPL
113424	2002 SU_{36}	—	September 29, 2002	Haleakala	NEAT	KOR	3.3 km	MPC · JPL
113425	2002 SH_{37}	—	September 29, 2002	Haleakala	NEAT	·	3.8 km	MPC · JPL
113426	2002 SR_{37}	—	September 29, 2002	Haleakala	NEAT	·	4.1 km	MPC · JPL
113427	2002 SU_{37}	—	September 29, 2002	Haleakala	NEAT	GEF	2.2 km	MPC · JPL
113428	2002 SG_{38}	—	September 30, 2002	Socorro	LINEAR	·	5.1 km	MPC · JPL
113429	2002 SV_{38}	—	September 30, 2002	Socorro	LINEAR	MRX	2.3 km	MPC · JPL
113430	2002 SD_{39}	—	September 30, 2002	Socorro	LINEAR	(1118)	7.3 km	MPC · JPL
113431	2002 SK_{39}	—	September 30, 2002	Socorro	LINEAR	·	3.2 km	MPC · JPL
113432	2002 SO_{39}	—	September 30, 2002	Socorro	LINEAR	·	3.9 km	MPC · JPL
113433	2002 SR_{39}	—	September 30, 2002	Haleakala	NEAT	·	2.5 km	MPC · JPL
113434	2002 SW_{39}	—	September 30, 2002	Socorro	LINEAR	·	1.9 km	MPC · JPL
113435	2002 SX_{39}	—	September 30, 2002	Haleakala	NEAT	·	4.9 km	MPC · JPL
113436	2002 SS_{40}	—	September 30, 2002	Haleakala	NEAT	·	2.2 km	MPC · JPL
113437	2002 SY_{40}	—	September 30, 2002	Haleakala	NEAT	·	3.7 km	MPC · JPL
113438	2002 SD_{41}	—	September 30, 2002	Haleakala	NEAT	slow	3.1 km	MPC · JPL
113439	2002 SJ_{42}	—	September 28, 2002	Palomar	NEAT	(12739)	2.9 km	MPC · JPL
113440	2002 SR_{43}	—	September 28, 2002	Haleakala	NEAT	·	4.7 km	MPC · JPL
113441	2002 ST_{43}	—	September 29, 2002	Haleakala	NEAT	EOS	3.6 km	MPC · JPL
113442	2002 SU_{43}	—	September 29, 2002	Haleakala	NEAT	(12739)	3.2 km	MPC · JPL
113443	2002 SX_{43}	—	September 29, 2002	Haleakala	NEAT	HOF	5.0 km	MPC · JPL
113444	2002 SH_{44}	—	September 29, 2002	Haleakala	NEAT	·	4.2 km	MPC · JPL
113445	2002 SL_{44}	—	September 29, 2002	Haleakala	NEAT	·	1.2 km	MPC · JPL
113446	2002 SN_{44}	—	September 29, 2002	Haleakala	NEAT	NYS	2.1 km	MPC · JPL
113447	2002 ST_{45}	—	September 29, 2002	Kitt Peak	Spacewatch	·	4.9 km	MPC · JPL
113448	2002 SZ_{45}	—	September 29, 2002	Haleakala	NEAT	·	4.2 km	MPC · JPL
113449	2002 SB_{46}	—	September 29, 2002	Haleakala	NEAT	HYG	6.8 km	MPC · JPL
113450	2002 SQ_{46}	—	September 29, 2002	Haleakala	NEAT	EOS	4.6 km	MPC · JPL
113451	2002 SB_{47}	—	September 29, 2002	Haleakala	NEAT	·	4.5 km	MPC · JPL
113452	2002 SF_{47}	—	September 30, 2002	Socorro	LINEAR	·	2.0 km	MPC · JPL
113453	2002 SZ_{47}	—	September 30, 2002	Socorro	LINEAR	·	2.1 km	MPC · JPL
113454	2002 SF_{48}	—	September 30, 2002	Socorro	LINEAR	(7744)	2.9 km	MPC · JPL
113455	2002 SR_{48}	—	September 30, 2002	Socorro	LINEAR	·	1.8 km	MPC · JPL
113456	2002 SV_{48}	—	September 30, 2002	Socorro	LINEAR	KOR	2.8 km	MPC · JPL
113457	2002 SB_{49}	—	September 30, 2002	Socorro	LINEAR	·	4.2 km	MPC · JPL
113458	2002 SH_{49}	—	September 30, 2002	Socorro	LINEAR	·	1.4 km	MPC · JPL
113459	2002 SN_{50}	—	September 30, 2002	Haleakala	NEAT	·	1.8 km	MPC · JPL
113460	2002 SV_{50}	—	September 30, 2002	Socorro	LINEAR	·	1.4 km	MPC · JPL
113461 McCay	2002 SX_{50}	McCay	September 30, 2002	Goodricke-Pigott	R. A. Tucker	·	1.9 km	MPC · JPL
113462	2002 SF_{51}	—	September 16, 2002	Haleakala	NEAT	·	2.8 km	MPC · JPL
113463	2002 SR_{51}	—	September 17, 2002	Palomar	NEAT	·	2.5 km	MPC · JPL
113464	2002 SO_{53}	—	September 19, 2002	Palomar	NEAT	·	2.8 km	MPC · JPL
113465	2002 SX_{53}	—	September 21, 2002	Palomar	NEAT	·	3.6 km	MPC · JPL
113466	2002 SH_{54}	—	September 30, 2002	Socorro	LINEAR	HYG	5.2 km	MPC · JPL
113467	2002 SO_{54}	—	September 30, 2002	Socorro	LINEAR	·	5.7 km	MPC · JPL
113468	2002 SP_{55}	—	September 30, 2002	Socorro	LINEAR	V	1.5 km	MPC · JPL
113469	2002 ST_{55}	—	September 30, 2002	Socorro	LINEAR	AGN	2.5 km	MPC · JPL
113470	2002 SX_{55}	—	September 30, 2002	Socorro	LINEAR	·	2.7 km	MPC · JPL
113471	2002 SY_{55}	—	September 30, 2002	Socorro	LINEAR	WIT	1.7 km	MPC · JPL
113472	2002 SU_{56}	—	September 30, 2002	Socorro	LINEAR	·	1.4 km	MPC · JPL
113473	2002 SB_{57}	—	September 30, 2002	Socorro	LINEAR	·	2.7 km	MPC · JPL
113474	2002 ST_{57}	—	September 30, 2002	Haleakala	NEAT	·	6.3 km	MPC · JPL
113475	2002 SV_{57}	—	September 30, 2002	Haleakala	NEAT	·	5.8 km	MPC · JPL
113476	2002 SM_{58}	—	September 30, 2002	Haleakala	NEAT	GEF	3.7 km	MPC · JPL
113477	2002 SS_{58}	—	September 30, 2002	Socorro	LINEAR	·	3.4 km	MPC · JPL
113478	2002 ST_{63}	—	September 25, 2002	Palomar	NEAT	NYS	1.8 km	MPC · JPL
113479	2002 TF	—	October 1, 2002	Haleakala	NEAT	·	3.0 km	MPC · JPL
113480	2002 TH	—	October 1, 2002	Anderson Mesa	LONEOS	·	3.8 km	MPC · JPL
113481	2002 TL	—	October 1, 2002	Anderson Mesa	LONEOS	·	4.5 km	MPC · JPL
113482	2002 TN	—	October 1, 2002	Anderson Mesa	LONEOS	KOR	2.8 km	MPC · JPL
113483	2002 TO	—	October 1, 2002	Anderson Mesa	LONEOS	·	1.4 km	MPC · JPL
113484	2002 TQ_{1}	—	October 1, 2002	Anderson Mesa	LONEOS	·	2.0 km	MPC · JPL
113485	2002 TX_{1}	—	October 1, 2002	Anderson Mesa	LONEOS	·	1.3 km	MPC · JPL
113486	2002 TE_{2}	—	October 1, 2002	Anderson Mesa	LONEOS	KOR	2.5 km	MPC · JPL
113487	2002 TL_{2}	—	October 1, 2002	Anderson Mesa	LONEOS	·	1.4 km	MPC · JPL
113488	2002 TR_{2}	—	October 1, 2002	Anderson Mesa	LONEOS	·	4.5 km	MPC · JPL
113489	2002 TW_{2}	—	October 1, 2002	Anderson Mesa	LONEOS	NYS	2.0 km	MPC · JPL
113490	2002 TB_{3}	—	October 1, 2002	Anderson Mesa	LONEOS	WIT	2.0 km	MPC · JPL
113491	2002 TV_{3}	—	October 1, 2002	Anderson Mesa	LONEOS	·	5.8 km	MPC · JPL
113492	2002 TW_{3}	—	October 1, 2002	Anderson Mesa	LONEOS	·	3.5 km	MPC · JPL
113493	2002 TB_{4}	—	October 1, 2002	Socorro	LINEAR	·	3.3 km	MPC · JPL
113494	2002 TK_{4}	—	October 1, 2002	Anderson Mesa	LONEOS	·	1 km	MPC · JPL
113495	2002 TD_{5}	—	October 1, 2002	Socorro	LINEAR	·	3.4 km	MPC · JPL
113496	2002 TF_{5}	—	October 1, 2002	Socorro	LINEAR	·	4.8 km	MPC · JPL
113497	2002 TQ_{5}	—	October 1, 2002	Anderson Mesa	LONEOS	·	1.2 km	MPC · JPL
113498	2002 TU_{5}	—	October 1, 2002	Anderson Mesa	LONEOS	HYG	4.7 km	MPC · JPL
113499	2002 TA_{6}	—	October 1, 2002	Anderson Mesa	LONEOS	KOR	2.9 km	MPC · JPL
113500	2002 TO_{6}	—	October 1, 2002	Socorro	LINEAR	·	8.2 km	MPC · JPL

== 113501–113600 ==
back to top

Designation			Discovery			Properties		Ref
Permanent	Provisional	Named after	Date	Site	Discoverer(s)	Category	Diam.	Ref
113501	2002 TS_{6}	—	October 1, 2002	Socorro	LINEAR	·	4.8 km	MPC · JPL
113502	2002 TY_{6}	—	October 1, 2002	Socorro	LINEAR	·	2.2 km	MPC · JPL
113503	2002 TA_{7}	—	October 1, 2002	Anderson Mesa	LONEOS	ADE	6.7 km	MPC · JPL
113504	2002 TC_{7}	—	October 1, 2002	Anderson Mesa	LONEOS	AST	4.4 km	MPC · JPL
113505	2002 TJ_{7}	—	October 1, 2002	Anderson Mesa	LONEOS	·	4.1 km	MPC · JPL
113506	2002 TL_{7}	—	October 1, 2002	Anderson Mesa	LONEOS	·	2.6 km	MPC · JPL
113507	2002 TS_{7}	—	October 1, 2002	Haleakala	NEAT	EUP · slow	9.7 km	MPC · JPL
113508	2002 TG_{8}	—	October 1, 2002	Haleakala	NEAT	NYS	2.3 km	MPC · JPL
113509	2002 TK_{8}	—	October 1, 2002	Haleakala	NEAT	·	3.0 km	MPC · JPL
113510	2002 TP_{8}	—	October 1, 2002	Haleakala	NEAT	HOF	6.5 km	MPC · JPL
113511	2002 TT_{9}	—	October 1, 2002	Anderson Mesa	LONEOS	NYS	2.5 km	MPC · JPL
113512	2002 TS_{11}	—	October 1, 2002	Anderson Mesa	LONEOS	·	7.1 km	MPC · JPL
113513	2002 TP_{12}	—	October 1, 2002	Anderson Mesa	LONEOS	·	1.6 km	MPC · JPL
113514	2002 TY_{12}	—	October 1, 2002	Anderson Mesa	LONEOS	·	1.2 km	MPC · JPL
113515	2002 TT_{13}	—	October 1, 2002	Anderson Mesa	LONEOS	KOR	3.0 km	MPC · JPL
113516	2002 TU_{13}	—	October 1, 2002	Socorro	LINEAR	·	1.5 km	MPC · JPL
113517	2002 TW_{13}	—	October 1, 2002	Socorro	LINEAR	KOR	2.5 km	MPC · JPL
113518	2002 TC_{14}	—	October 1, 2002	Socorro	LINEAR	·	1.7 km	MPC · JPL
113519	2002 TB_{15}	—	October 1, 2002	Haleakala	NEAT	·	2.3 km	MPC · JPL
113520	2002 TR_{15}	—	October 2, 2002	Socorro	LINEAR	MAS	1.1 km	MPC · JPL
113521	2002 TH_{16}	—	October 2, 2002	Socorro	LINEAR	·	4.3 km	MPC · JPL
113522	2002 TL_{16}	—	October 2, 2002	Socorro	LINEAR	·	3.0 km	MPC · JPL
113523	2002 TV_{16}	—	October 2, 2002	Socorro	LINEAR	·	2.7 km	MPC · JPL
113524	2002 TV_{17}	—	October 2, 2002	Socorro	LINEAR	·	7.7 km	MPC · JPL
113525	2002 TD_{19}	—	October 2, 2002	Socorro	LINEAR	·	3.3 km	MPC · JPL
113526	2002 TK_{19}	—	October 2, 2002	Socorro	LINEAR	PAD · fast	4.0 km	MPC · JPL
113527	2002 TO_{19}	—	October 2, 2002	Socorro	LINEAR	·	1.3 km	MPC · JPL
113528	2002 TP_{19}	—	October 2, 2002	Socorro	LINEAR	·	2.8 km	MPC · JPL
113529	2002 TY_{19}	—	October 2, 2002	Socorro	LINEAR	·	3.2 km	MPC · JPL
113530	2002 TK_{20}	—	October 2, 2002	Socorro	LINEAR	·	2.7 km	MPC · JPL
113531	2002 TQ_{20}	—	October 2, 2002	Socorro	LINEAR	·	1.2 km	MPC · JPL
113532	2002 TX_{20}	—	October 2, 2002	Socorro	LINEAR	MAS	1.2 km	MPC · JPL
113533	2002 TL_{21}	—	October 2, 2002	Socorro	LINEAR	·	3.6 km	MPC · JPL
113534	2002 TN_{21}	—	October 2, 2002	Socorro	LINEAR	·	3.6 km	MPC · JPL
113535	2002 TZ_{22}	—	October 2, 2002	Socorro	LINEAR	KOR	2.3 km	MPC · JPL
113536	2002 TY_{23}	—	October 2, 2002	Socorro	LINEAR	·	2.9 km	MPC · JPL
113537	2002 TZ_{23}	—	October 2, 2002	Socorro	LINEAR	·	4.2 km	MPC · JPL
113538	2002 TE_{24}	—	October 2, 2002	Socorro	LINEAR	·	3.8 km	MPC · JPL
113539	2002 TF_{24}	—	October 2, 2002	Socorro	LINEAR	·	6.1 km	MPC · JPL
113540	2002 TT_{24}	—	October 2, 2002	Socorro	LINEAR	BRG	2.8 km	MPC · JPL
113541	2002 TU_{25}	—	October 2, 2002	Socorro	LINEAR	·	3.8 km	MPC · JPL
113542	2002 TO_{26}	—	October 2, 2002	Socorro	LINEAR	·	7.8 km	MPC · JPL
113543	2002 TD_{27}	—	October 2, 2002	Socorro	LINEAR	·	2.0 km	MPC · JPL
113544	2002 TE_{27}	—	October 2, 2002	Socorro	LINEAR	PAD	5.5 km	MPC · JPL
113545	2002 TN_{27}	—	October 2, 2002	Socorro	LINEAR	·	1.3 km	MPC · JPL
113546	2002 TR_{27}	—	October 2, 2002	Socorro	LINEAR	·	2.9 km	MPC · JPL
113547	2002 TX_{27}	—	October 2, 2002	Socorro	LINEAR	·	4.3 km	MPC · JPL
113548	2002 TY_{27}	—	October 2, 2002	Socorro	LINEAR	·	3.2 km	MPC · JPL
113549	2002 TF_{28}	—	October 2, 2002	Socorro	LINEAR	·	4.3 km	MPC · JPL
113550	2002 TJ_{28}	—	October 2, 2002	Socorro	LINEAR	·	1.5 km	MPC · JPL
113551	2002 TK_{28}	—	October 2, 2002	Socorro	LINEAR	·	4.5 km	MPC · JPL
113552	2002 TZ_{28}	—	October 2, 2002	Socorro	LINEAR	·	1.6 km	MPC · JPL
113553	2002 TN_{29}	—	October 2, 2002	Socorro	LINEAR	NYS	2.0 km	MPC · JPL
113554	2002 TZ_{29}	—	October 2, 2002	Socorro	LINEAR	GEF	3.3 km	MPC · JPL
113555	2002 TU_{30}	—	October 2, 2002	Socorro	LINEAR	HYG	6.9 km	MPC · JPL
113556	2002 TH_{31}	—	October 2, 2002	Socorro	LINEAR	·	6.0 km	MPC · JPL
113557	2002 TP_{31}	—	October 2, 2002	Socorro	LINEAR	·	1.3 km	MPC · JPL
113558	2002 TS_{31}	—	October 2, 2002	Socorro	LINEAR	MAR	3.0 km	MPC · JPL
113559	2002 TT_{31}	—	October 2, 2002	Socorro	LINEAR	·	1.2 km	MPC · JPL
113560	2002 TA_{32}	—	October 2, 2002	Socorro	LINEAR	V	1.4 km	MPC · JPL
113561	2002 TY_{33}	—	October 2, 2002	Socorro	LINEAR	·	3.3 km	MPC · JPL
113562	2002 TC_{34}	—	October 2, 2002	Socorro	LINEAR	·	5.4 km	MPC · JPL
113563	2002 TO_{34}	—	October 2, 2002	Socorro	LINEAR	·	3.6 km	MPC · JPL
113564	2002 TC_{35}	—	October 2, 2002	Socorro	LINEAR	·	5.0 km	MPC · JPL
113565	2002 TP_{35}	—	October 2, 2002	Socorro	LINEAR	EOS	4.2 km	MPC · JPL
113566	2002 TG_{36}	—	October 2, 2002	Socorro	LINEAR	·	4.4 km	MPC · JPL
113567	2002 TV_{36}	—	October 2, 2002	Socorro	LINEAR	·	2.2 km	MPC · JPL
113568	2002 TY_{36}	—	October 2, 2002	Socorro	LINEAR	KOR	3.0 km	MPC · JPL
113569	2002 TZ_{36}	—	October 2, 2002	Socorro	LINEAR	·	5.5 km	MPC · JPL
113570	2002 TP_{37}	—	October 2, 2002	Socorro	LINEAR	·	1.5 km	MPC · JPL
113571	2002 TY_{37}	—	October 2, 2002	Socorro	LINEAR	·	1.2 km	MPC · JPL
113572	2002 TL_{38}	—	October 2, 2002	Socorro	LINEAR	·	4.4 km	MPC · JPL
113573	2002 TR_{39}	—	October 2, 2002	Socorro	LINEAR	(5)	2.2 km	MPC · JPL
113574	2002 TF_{40}	—	October 2, 2002	Socorro	LINEAR	BAP	1.8 km	MPC · JPL
113575	2002 TO_{40}	—	October 2, 2002	Socorro	LINEAR	·	3.2 km	MPC · JPL
113576	2002 TC_{41}	—	October 2, 2002	Socorro	LINEAR	·	5.5 km	MPC · JPL
113577	2002 TM_{41}	—	October 2, 2002	Socorro	LINEAR	·	10 km	MPC · JPL
113578	2002 TX_{41}	—	October 2, 2002	Socorro	LINEAR	·	3.1 km	MPC · JPL
113579	2002 TT_{42}	—	October 2, 2002	Socorro	LINEAR	·	1.7 km	MPC · JPL
113580	2002 TX_{42}	—	October 2, 2002	Socorro	LINEAR	·	4.5 km	MPC · JPL
113581	2002 TU_{43}	—	October 2, 2002	Socorro	LINEAR	·	6.1 km	MPC · JPL
113582	2002 TQ_{44}	—	October 2, 2002	Socorro	LINEAR	·	3.4 km	MPC · JPL
113583	2002 TS_{45}	—	October 2, 2002	Socorro	LINEAR	·	3.6 km	MPC · JPL
113584	2002 TT_{45}	—	October 2, 2002	Socorro	LINEAR	·	7.9 km	MPC · JPL
113585	2002 TN_{46}	—	October 2, 2002	Socorro	LINEAR	·	4.0 km	MPC · JPL
113586	2002 TT_{46}	—	October 2, 2002	Socorro	LINEAR	·	4.1 km	MPC · JPL
113587	2002 TX_{46}	—	October 2, 2002	Socorro	LINEAR	THM	3.8 km	MPC · JPL
113588	2002 TE_{47}	—	October 2, 2002	Socorro	LINEAR	EOS	3.1 km	MPC · JPL
113589	2002 TB_{48}	—	October 2, 2002	Socorro	LINEAR	·	1.7 km	MPC · JPL
113590	2002 TM_{48}	—	October 2, 2002	Socorro	LINEAR	·	4.2 km	MPC · JPL
113591	2002 TK_{49}	—	October 2, 2002	Socorro	LINEAR	·	1.0 km	MPC · JPL
113592	2002 TM_{49}	—	October 2, 2002	Socorro	LINEAR	·	3.6 km	MPC · JPL
113593	2002 TT_{49}	—	October 2, 2002	Socorro	LINEAR	MRX	2.0 km	MPC · JPL
113594	2002 TA_{50}	—	October 2, 2002	Socorro	LINEAR	slow	4.8 km	MPC · JPL
113595	2002 TH_{50}	—	October 2, 2002	Socorro	LINEAR	EUN	2.2 km	MPC · JPL
113596	2002 TN_{50}	—	October 2, 2002	Socorro	LINEAR	·	1.5 km	MPC · JPL
113597	2002 TZ_{50}	—	October 2, 2002	Socorro	LINEAR	·	1.8 km	MPC · JPL
113598	2002 TL_{51}	—	October 2, 2002	Socorro	LINEAR	·	6.8 km	MPC · JPL
113599	2002 TW_{51}	—	October 2, 2002	Socorro	LINEAR	·	5.5 km	MPC · JPL
113600	2002 TX_{51}	—	October 2, 2002	Socorro	LINEAR	·	1.8 km	MPC · JPL

== 113601–113700 ==
back to top

Designation			Discovery			Properties		Ref
Permanent	Provisional	Named after	Date	Site	Discoverer(s)	Category	Diam.	Ref
113601	2002 TY_{51}	—	October 2, 2002	Socorro	LINEAR	·	6.8 km	MPC · JPL
113602	2002 TF_{52}	—	October 2, 2002	Socorro	LINEAR	·	1.8 km	MPC · JPL
113603	2002 TR_{52}	—	October 2, 2002	Socorro	LINEAR	(5)	2.0 km	MPC · JPL
113604	2002 TV_{52}	—	October 2, 2002	Socorro	LINEAR	·	1.6 km	MPC · JPL
113605	2002 TD_{53}	—	October 2, 2002	Socorro	LINEAR	V	1.3 km	MPC · JPL
113606	2002 TO_{53}	—	October 2, 2002	Socorro	LINEAR	(2076)	2.2 km	MPC · JPL
113607	2002 TQ_{53}	—	October 2, 2002	Socorro	LINEAR	·	7.7 km	MPC · JPL
113608	2002 TW_{53}	—	October 2, 2002	Socorro	LINEAR	V	1.3 km	MPC · JPL
113609	2002 TC_{54}	—	October 2, 2002	Socorro	LINEAR	·	3.3 km	MPC · JPL
113610	2002 TG_{54}	—	October 2, 2002	Socorro	LINEAR	·	1.8 km	MPC · JPL
113611	2002 TM_{54}	—	October 2, 2002	Socorro	LINEAR	·	1.4 km	MPC · JPL
113612	2002 TU_{54}	—	October 2, 2002	Socorro	LINEAR	KOR	2.4 km	MPC · JPL
113613	2002 TJ_{55}	—	October 2, 2002	Haleakala	NEAT	·	2.9 km	MPC · JPL
113614	2002 TN_{55}	—	October 2, 2002	Haleakala	NEAT	·	4.1 km	MPC · JPL
113615	2002 TO_{56}	—	October 3, 2002	Socorro	LINEAR	PHO	2.3 km	MPC · JPL
113616	2002 TU_{56}	—	October 2, 2002	Socorro	LINEAR	NYS	1.5 km	MPC · JPL
113617	2002 TJ_{57}	—	October 2, 2002	Socorro	LINEAR	HYG	4.2 km	MPC · JPL
113618	2002 TZ_{58}	—	October 4, 2002	Fountain Hills	C. W. Juels, P. R. Holvorcem	·	4.6 km	MPC · JPL
113619	2002 TU_{60}	—	October 3, 2002	Socorro	LINEAR	·	5.5 km	MPC · JPL
113620 Valelucarotti	2002 TR_{61}	Valelucarotti	October 3, 2002	Campo Imperatore	CINEOS	·	4.7 km	MPC · JPL
113621 Danielafaggi	2002 TA_{62}	Danielafaggi	October 3, 2002	Campo Imperatore	CINEOS	·	5.4 km	MPC · JPL
113622 Serafinacarpino	2002 TE_{62}	Serafinacarpino	October 3, 2002	Campo Imperatore	CINEOS	·	4.6 km	MPC · JPL
113623 Stefanovoglino	2002 TO_{63}	Stefanovoglino	October 3, 2002	Campo Imperatore	CINEOS	·	1.7 km	MPC · JPL
113624	2002 TD_{64}	—	October 4, 2002	Socorro	LINEAR	·	3.1 km	MPC · JPL
113625	2002 TD_{65}	—	October 2, 2002	Kvistaberg	Uppsala-DLR Asteroid Survey	(2076)	1.5 km	MPC · JPL
113626 Centorenazzo	2002 TZ_{65}	Centorenazzo	October 4, 2002	Campo Imperatore	F. Bernardi	·	3.4 km	MPC · JPL
113627	2002 TH_{67}	—	October 6, 2002	Essen	Essen	JUN	2.5 km	MPC · JPL
113628	2002 TM_{70}	—	October 3, 2002	Palomar	NEAT	·	9.6 km	MPC · JPL
113629	2002 TU_{70}	—	October 3, 2002	Palomar	NEAT	·	4.1 km	MPC · JPL
113630	2002 TZ_{70}	—	October 3, 2002	Palomar	NEAT	·	2.6 km	MPC · JPL
113631	2002 TB_{71}	—	October 3, 2002	Palomar	NEAT	EOS	4.0 km	MPC · JPL
113632	2002 TA_{72}	—	October 3, 2002	Palomar	NEAT	PHO	3.7 km	MPC · JPL
113633	2002 TN_{73}	—	October 3, 2002	Palomar	NEAT	·	5.9 km	MPC · JPL
113634	2002 TW_{73}	—	October 3, 2002	Palomar	NEAT	EOS	3.8 km	MPC · JPL
113635	2002 TG_{74}	—	October 3, 2002	Palomar	NEAT	·	5.4 km	MPC · JPL
113636	2002 TH_{75}	—	October 1, 2002	Anderson Mesa	LONEOS	PAD	4.9 km	MPC · JPL
113637	2002 TK_{75}	—	October 1, 2002	Anderson Mesa	LONEOS	·	2.3 km	MPC · JPL
113638	2002 TC_{76}	—	October 1, 2002	Anderson Mesa	LONEOS	·	1.8 km	MPC · JPL
113639	2002 TK_{76}	—	October 1, 2002	Anderson Mesa	LONEOS	·	1.4 km	MPC · JPL
113640	2002 TM_{76}	—	October 1, 2002	Anderson Mesa	LONEOS	AGN	2.5 km	MPC · JPL
113641	2002 TY_{76}	—	October 1, 2002	Anderson Mesa	LONEOS	·	4.5 km	MPC · JPL
113642	2002 TT_{77}	—	October 1, 2002	Anderson Mesa	LONEOS	·	4.4 km	MPC · JPL
113643	2002 TV_{77}	—	October 1, 2002	Anderson Mesa	LONEOS	·	3.7 km	MPC · JPL
113644	2002 TG_{78}	—	October 1, 2002	Anderson Mesa	LONEOS	·	2.8 km	MPC · JPL
113645	2002 TN_{78}	—	October 1, 2002	Socorro	LINEAR	·	4.0 km	MPC · JPL
113646	2002 TS_{78}	—	October 1, 2002	Haleakala	NEAT	(18466)	3.7 km	MPC · JPL
113647	2002 TU_{78}	—	October 1, 2002	Haleakala	NEAT	·	2.1 km	MPC · JPL
113648	2002 TR_{79}	—	October 1, 2002	Socorro	LINEAR	·	4.7 km	MPC · JPL
113649	2002 TX_{79}	—	October 1, 2002	Socorro	LINEAR	slow	5.2 km	MPC · JPL
113650	2002 TT_{80}	—	October 1, 2002	Socorro	LINEAR	V	1.9 km	MPC · JPL
113651	2002 TW_{80}	—	October 1, 2002	Socorro	LINEAR	·	1.8 km	MPC · JPL
113652	2002 TR_{81}	—	October 1, 2002	Socorro	LINEAR	·	4.1 km	MPC · JPL
113653	2002 TY_{81}	—	October 1, 2002	Haleakala	NEAT	·	2.3 km	MPC · JPL
113654	2002 TH_{83}	—	October 2, 2002	Socorro	LINEAR	·	1.7 km	MPC · JPL
113655	2002 TK_{83}	—	October 2, 2002	Haleakala	NEAT	HYG	6.7 km	MPC · JPL
113656	2002 TY_{83}	—	October 2, 2002	Haleakala	NEAT	·	6.4 km	MPC · JPL
113657	2002 TV_{84}	—	October 2, 2002	Haleakala	NEAT	·	3.6 km	MPC · JPL
113658	2002 TH_{85}	—	October 2, 2002	Haleakala	NEAT	·	3.0 km	MPC · JPL
113659 Faltona	2002 TQ_{85}	Faltona	October 2, 2002	Campo Imperatore	Palomba, E.	·	5.1 km	MPC · JPL
113660	2002 TX_{85}	—	October 2, 2002	Campo Imperatore	CINEOS	·	5.7 km	MPC · JPL
113661 Augustodaolio	2002 TE_{86}	Augustodaolio	October 2, 2002	Campo Imperatore	F. Bernardi, M. Lombardo	(5651)	6.3 km	MPC · JPL
113662	2002 TC_{88}	—	October 3, 2002	Socorro	LINEAR	EOS	3.9 km	MPC · JPL
113663	2002 TD_{88}	—	October 3, 2002	Socorro	LINEAR	V	1.3 km	MPC · JPL
113664	2002 TB_{89}	—	October 3, 2002	Palomar	NEAT	·	1.6 km	MPC · JPL
113665	2002 TQ_{89}	—	October 3, 2002	Palomar	NEAT	·	1.6 km	MPC · JPL
113666	2002 TA_{90}	—	October 3, 2002	Palomar	NEAT	·	8.2 km	MPC · JPL
113667	2002 TB_{91}	—	October 3, 2002	Palomar	NEAT	CYB	7.9 km	MPC · JPL
113668	2002 TN_{91}	—	October 3, 2002	Palomar	NEAT	·	1.4 km	MPC · JPL
113669	2002 TO_{91}	—	October 3, 2002	Palomar	NEAT	EOS	4.3 km	MPC · JPL
113670	2002 TK_{93}	—	October 3, 2002	Palomar	NEAT	PHO	4.6 km	MPC · JPL
113671 Sacromonte	2002 TM_{96}	Sacromonte	October 13, 2002	Schiaparelli	L. Buzzi	·	6.4 km	MPC · JPL
113672	2002 TN_{96}	—	October 10, 2002	Farpoint	Farpoint	·	2.8 km	MPC · JPL
113673 Bettystrickland	2002 TU_{97}	Bettystrickland	October 2, 2002	Campo Imperatore	F. Bernardi	·	6.2 km	MPC · JPL
113674	2002 TV_{99}	—	October 4, 2002	Socorro	LINEAR	·	2.0 km	MPC · JPL
113675	2002 TN_{102}	—	October 4, 2002	Socorro	LINEAR	·	4.8 km	MPC · JPL
113676	2002 TJ_{103}	—	October 4, 2002	Socorro	LINEAR	·	3.1 km	MPC · JPL
113677	2002 TJ_{105}	—	October 4, 2002	Anderson Mesa	LONEOS	·	5.8 km	MPC · JPL
113678	2002 TV_{106}	—	October 2, 2002	Socorro	LINEAR	·	5.2 km	MPC · JPL
113679	2002 TB_{108}	—	October 1, 2002	Anderson Mesa	LONEOS	·	4.1 km	MPC · JPL
113680	2002 TY_{108}	—	October 1, 2002	Haleakala	NEAT	·	3.8 km	MPC · JPL
113681	2002 TL_{110}	—	October 2, 2002	Haleakala	NEAT	·	1.8 km	MPC · JPL
113682	2002 TQ_{110}	—	October 2, 2002	Haleakala	NEAT	·	7.3 km	MPC · JPL
113683 Robertoornella	2002 TB_{111}	Robertoornella	October 2, 2002	Campo Imperatore	M. Tombelli, F. Bernardi	EOS	4.3 km	MPC · JPL
113684 Giannagianni	2002 TG_{111}	Giannagianni	October 2, 2002	Campo Imperatore	M. Tombelli, F. Bernardi	·	6.9 km	MPC · JPL
113685	2002 TQ_{111}	—	October 3, 2002	Socorro	LINEAR	KOR	3.1 km	MPC · JPL
113686	2002 TL_{112}	—	October 3, 2002	Socorro	LINEAR	·	4.4 km	MPC · JPL
113687	2002 TZ_{113}	—	October 3, 2002	Palomar	NEAT	·	8.7 km	MPC · JPL
113688	2002 TW_{114}	—	October 3, 2002	Palomar	NEAT	·	2.2 km	MPC · JPL
113689	2002 TP_{115}	—	October 3, 2002	Palomar	NEAT	·	6.1 km	MPC · JPL
113690	2002 TK_{116}	—	October 3, 2002	Palomar	NEAT	·	3.6 km	MPC · JPL
113691	2002 TG_{120}	—	October 3, 2002	Palomar	NEAT	·	2.8 km	MPC · JPL
113692	2002 TH_{120}	—	October 3, 2002	Palomar	NEAT	·	2.3 km	MPC · JPL
113693	2002 TS_{120}	—	October 3, 2002	Palomar	NEAT	·	4.1 km	MPC · JPL
113694	2002 TB_{121}	—	October 3, 2002	Palomar	NEAT	·	3.9 km	MPC · JPL
113695	2002 TF_{121}	—	October 3, 2002	Palomar	NEAT	·	1.8 km	MPC · JPL
113696	2002 TL_{121}	—	October 3, 2002	Palomar	NEAT	EOS	5.2 km	MPC · JPL
113697	2002 TM_{121}	—	October 3, 2002	Palomar	NEAT	·	1.5 km	MPC · JPL
113698	2002 TS_{124}	—	October 4, 2002	Palomar	NEAT	·	6.3 km	MPC · JPL
113699	2002 TT_{124}	—	October 4, 2002	Palomar	NEAT	·	1.3 km	MPC · JPL
113700	2002 TV_{124}	—	October 4, 2002	Palomar	NEAT	EOS	4.1 km	MPC · JPL

== 113701–113800 ==
back to top

Designation			Discovery			Properties		Ref
Permanent	Provisional	Named after	Date	Site	Discoverer(s)	Category	Diam.	Ref
113701	2002 TT_{125}	—	October 4, 2002	Socorro	LINEAR	·	5.5 km	MPC · JPL
113702	2002 TJ_{126}	—	October 4, 2002	Socorro	LINEAR	·	6.7 km	MPC · JPL
113703	2002 TS_{126}	—	October 4, 2002	Socorro	LINEAR	·	1.4 km	MPC · JPL
113704	2002 TQ_{127}	—	October 4, 2002	Palomar	NEAT	EOS	4.7 km	MPC · JPL
113705	2002 TS_{127}	—	October 4, 2002	Socorro	LINEAR	·	5.3 km	MPC · JPL
113706	2002 TB_{129}	—	October 4, 2002	Palomar	NEAT	·	3.9 km	MPC · JPL
113707	2002 TM_{129}	—	October 4, 2002	Palomar	NEAT	VER	6.4 km	MPC · JPL
113708	2002 TW_{130}	—	October 4, 2002	Socorro	LINEAR	EOS	4.2 km	MPC · JPL
113709	2002 TS_{131}	—	October 4, 2002	Socorro	LINEAR	·	3.2 km	MPC · JPL
113710	2002 TH_{132}	—	October 4, 2002	Socorro	LINEAR	DOR	5.9 km	MPC · JPL
113711	2002 TK_{132}	—	October 4, 2002	Socorro	LINEAR	·	2.3 km	MPC · JPL
113712	2002 TN_{132}	—	October 4, 2002	Socorro	LINEAR	·	7.2 km	MPC · JPL
113713	2002 TO_{132}	—	October 4, 2002	Socorro	LINEAR	VER	8.6 km	MPC · JPL
113714	2002 TK_{133}	—	October 4, 2002	Socorro	LINEAR	HYG	5.7 km	MPC · JPL
113715	2002 TM_{133}	—	October 4, 2002	Anderson Mesa	LONEOS	·	6.5 km	MPC · JPL
113716	2002 TH_{134}	—	October 4, 2002	Palomar	NEAT	EOS	4.3 km	MPC · JPL
113717	2002 TV_{134}	—	October 4, 2002	Palomar	NEAT	·	1.5 km	MPC · JPL
113718	2002 TV_{135}	—	October 4, 2002	Anderson Mesa	LONEOS	·	6.1 km	MPC · JPL
113719	2002 TH_{136}	—	October 4, 2002	Anderson Mesa	LONEOS	BRG	3.5 km	MPC · JPL
113720	2002 TZ_{136}	—	October 4, 2002	Palomar	NEAT	·	4.6 km	MPC · JPL
113721	2002 TB_{137}	—	October 4, 2002	Anderson Mesa	LONEOS	EOS	4.0 km	MPC · JPL
113722	2002 TV_{137}	—	October 4, 2002	Anderson Mesa	LONEOS	·	1.5 km	MPC · JPL
113723	2002 TD_{138}	—	October 4, 2002	Anderson Mesa	LONEOS	·	5.1 km	MPC · JPL
113724	2002 TL_{138}	—	October 4, 2002	Anderson Mesa	LONEOS	·	9.8 km	MPC · JPL
113725	2002 TV_{139}	—	October 4, 2002	Anderson Mesa	LONEOS	·	1.7 km	MPC · JPL
113726	2002 TJ_{140}	—	October 5, 2002	Palomar	NEAT	·	2.2 km	MPC · JPL
113727	2002 TO_{141}	—	October 4, 2002	Socorro	LINEAR	PHO	2.4 km	MPC · JPL
113728	2002 TR_{142}	—	October 4, 2002	Socorro	LINEAR	·	3.0 km	MPC · JPL
113729	2002 TZ_{142}	—	October 4, 2002	Socorro	LINEAR	·	2.8 km	MPC · JPL
113730	2002 TA_{143}	—	October 4, 2002	Socorro	LINEAR	·	3.0 km	MPC · JPL
113731	2002 TO_{143}	—	October 4, 2002	Socorro	LINEAR	·	4.2 km	MPC · JPL
113732	2002 TQ_{143}	—	October 4, 2002	Socorro	LINEAR	·	2.7 km	MPC · JPL
113733	2002 TX_{144}	—	October 2, 2002	Socorro	LINEAR	KOR	2.1 km	MPC · JPL
113734	2002 TS_{150}	—	October 5, 2002	Palomar	NEAT	·	1.1 km	MPC · JPL
113735	2002 TF_{154}	—	October 5, 2002	Socorro	LINEAR	EOS	3.9 km	MPC · JPL
113736	2002 TD_{155}	—	October 5, 2002	Socorro	LINEAR	EOS	4.1 km	MPC · JPL
113737	2002 TT_{156}	—	October 5, 2002	Palomar	NEAT	·	2.8 km	MPC · JPL
113738	2002 TM_{157}	—	October 5, 2002	Palomar	NEAT	·	2.4 km	MPC · JPL
113739	2002 TX_{157}	—	October 5, 2002	Socorro	LINEAR	·	2.3 km	MPC · JPL
113740	2002 TJ_{159}	—	October 5, 2002	Palomar	NEAT	·	4.5 km	MPC · JPL
113741	2002 TS_{160}	—	October 5, 2002	Palomar	NEAT	·	4.5 km	MPC · JPL
113742	2002 TD_{162}	—	October 5, 2002	Palomar	NEAT	·	2.8 km	MPC · JPL
113743	2002 TL_{162}	—	October 5, 2002	Palomar	NEAT	·	1.7 km	MPC · JPL
113744	2002 TE_{163}	—	October 5, 2002	Palomar	NEAT	·	7.3 km	MPC · JPL
113745	2002 TS_{163}	—	October 5, 2002	Palomar	NEAT	·	2.5 km	MPC · JPL
113746	2002 TA_{164}	—	October 5, 2002	Palomar	NEAT	·	3.2 km	MPC · JPL
113747	2002 TH_{164}	—	October 5, 2002	Palomar	NEAT	TIR · fast	7.4 km	MPC · JPL
113748	2002 TN_{164}	—	October 5, 2002	Palomar	NEAT	CYB	8.2 km	MPC · JPL
113749	2002 TB_{166}	—	October 3, 2002	Palomar	NEAT	·	6.6 km	MPC · JPL
113750	2002 TL_{166}	—	October 3, 2002	Socorro	LINEAR	·	3.6 km	MPC · JPL
113751	2002 TR_{166}	—	October 3, 2002	Palomar	NEAT	·	8.0 km	MPC · JPL
113752	2002 TF_{167}	—	October 3, 2002	Palomar	NEAT	·	3.1 km	MPC · JPL
113753	2002 TP_{167}	—	October 3, 2002	Palomar	NEAT	·	5.0 km	MPC · JPL
113754	2002 TC_{168}	—	October 3, 2002	Socorro	LINEAR	·	3.4 km	MPC · JPL
113755	2002 TE_{168}	—	October 3, 2002	Socorro	LINEAR	·	3.9 km	MPC · JPL
113756	2002 TG_{168}	—	October 3, 2002	Socorro	LINEAR	EUN	3.3 km	MPC · JPL
113757	2002 TM_{170}	—	October 3, 2002	Palomar	NEAT	·	4.1 km	MPC · JPL
113758	2002 TT_{170}	—	October 3, 2002	Palomar	NEAT	·	1.7 km	MPC · JPL
113759	2002 TT_{171}	—	October 4, 2002	Palomar	NEAT	·	8.2 km	MPC · JPL
113760	2002 TA_{172}	—	October 4, 2002	Anderson Mesa	LONEOS	·	5.4 km	MPC · JPL
113761	2002 TH_{172}	—	October 4, 2002	Socorro	LINEAR	·	6.0 km	MPC · JPL
113762	2002 TJ_{172}	—	October 4, 2002	Anderson Mesa	LONEOS	·	4.1 km	MPC · JPL
113763	2002 TL_{172}	—	October 4, 2002	Anderson Mesa	LONEOS	·	7.4 km	MPC · JPL
113764	2002 TO_{172}	—	October 4, 2002	Anderson Mesa	LONEOS	PHO	1.7 km	MPC · JPL
113765	2002 TX_{172}	—	October 4, 2002	Socorro	LINEAR	EOS	3.8 km	MPC · JPL
113766	2002 TR_{173}	—	October 4, 2002	Socorro	LINEAR	EOS	4.7 km	MPC · JPL
113767	2002 TY_{174}	—	October 4, 2002	Socorro	LINEAR	·	6.5 km	MPC · JPL
113768	2002 TJ_{177}	—	October 5, 2002	Palomar	NEAT	·	4.0 km	MPC · JPL
113769	2002 TB_{178}	—	October 11, 2002	Palomar	NEAT	·	2.9 km	MPC · JPL
113770	2002 TA_{179}	—	October 13, 2002	Palomar	NEAT	PAL	6.3 km	MPC · JPL
113771	2002 TQ_{181}	—	October 3, 2002	Socorro	LINEAR	·	2.1 km	MPC · JPL
113772	2002 TK_{183}	—	October 4, 2002	Socorro	LINEAR	EOS	4.6 km	MPC · JPL
113773	2002 TY_{183}	—	October 4, 2002	Socorro	LINEAR	·	5.0 km	MPC · JPL
113774	2002 TL_{184}	—	October 4, 2002	Socorro	LINEAR	·	1.9 km	MPC · JPL
113775	2002 TM_{184}	—	October 4, 2002	Socorro	LINEAR	EOS	3.9 km	MPC · JPL
113776	2002 TP_{184}	—	October 4, 2002	Socorro	LINEAR	PAD	4.2 km	MPC · JPL
113777	2002 TS_{184}	—	October 4, 2002	Socorro	LINEAR	·	1.7 km	MPC · JPL
113778	2002 TC_{185}	—	October 4, 2002	Socorro	LINEAR	·	1.0 km	MPC · JPL
113779	2002 TT_{187}	—	October 4, 2002	Socorro	LINEAR	·	5.3 km	MPC · JPL
113780	2002 TC_{188}	—	October 4, 2002	Socorro	LINEAR	·	1.1 km	MPC · JPL
113781	2002 TF_{188}	—	October 4, 2002	Palomar	NEAT	EOS	3.8 km	MPC · JPL
113782	2002 TU_{188}	—	October 4, 2002	Socorro	LINEAR	·	5.1 km	MPC · JPL
113783	2002 TA_{191}	—	October 1, 2002	Socorro	LINEAR	URS	8.4 km	MPC · JPL
113784	2002 TO_{191}	—	October 5, 2002	Anderson Mesa	LONEOS	·	6.4 km	MPC · JPL
113785	2002 TS_{191}	—	October 5, 2002	Anderson Mesa	LONEOS	·	9.3 km	MPC · JPL
113786	2002 TZ_{192}	—	October 3, 2002	Socorro	LINEAR	·	4.8 km	MPC · JPL
113787	2002 TH_{193}	—	October 3, 2002	Socorro	LINEAR	·	4.4 km	MPC · JPL
113788	2002 TY_{194}	—	October 3, 2002	Socorro	LINEAR	·	2.3 km	MPC · JPL
113789	2002 TZ_{194}	—	October 3, 2002	Socorro	LINEAR	KOR	2.3 km	MPC · JPL
113790	2002 TF_{195}	—	October 3, 2002	Socorro	LINEAR	·	4.9 km	MPC · JPL
113791	2002 TM_{195}	—	October 3, 2002	Socorro	LINEAR	·	3.6 km	MPC · JPL
113792	2002 TX_{195}	—	October 3, 2002	Socorro	LINEAR	·	3.5 km	MPC · JPL
113793	2002 TR_{196}	—	October 4, 2002	Socorro	LINEAR	·	3.2 km	MPC · JPL
113794	2002 TV_{197}	—	October 4, 2002	Socorro	LINEAR	·	7.2 km	MPC · JPL
113795	2002 TZ_{197}	—	October 4, 2002	Socorro	LINEAR	(1298)	6.6 km	MPC · JPL
113796	2002 TQ_{198}	—	October 5, 2002	Socorro	LINEAR	·	3.3 km	MPC · JPL
113797	2002 TB_{200}	—	October 6, 2002	Anderson Mesa	LONEOS	·	9.0 km	MPC · JPL
113798	2002 TG_{203}	—	October 4, 2002	Socorro	LINEAR	·	4.0 km	MPC · JPL
113799	2002 TW_{203}	—	October 4, 2002	Socorro	LINEAR	·	1.4 km	MPC · JPL
113800	2002 TG_{204}	—	October 4, 2002	Socorro	LINEAR	slow	1.5 km	MPC · JPL

== 113801–113900 ==
back to top

Designation			Discovery			Properties		Ref
Permanent	Provisional	Named after	Date	Site	Discoverer(s)	Category	Diam.	Ref
113801	2002 TM_{205}	—	October 4, 2002	Socorro	LINEAR	·	2.1 km	MPC · JPL
113802	2002 TD_{206}	—	October 4, 2002	Socorro	LINEAR	EOS	4.6 km	MPC · JPL
113803	2002 TJ_{206}	—	October 4, 2002	Socorro	LINEAR	·	1.5 km	MPC · JPL
113804	2002 TA_{207}	—	October 4, 2002	Socorro	LINEAR	ADE	6.8 km	MPC · JPL
113805	2002 TF_{207}	—	October 4, 2002	Socorro	LINEAR	·	1.4 km	MPC · JPL
113806	2002 TM_{208}	—	October 4, 2002	Socorro	LINEAR	(5)	3.6 km	MPC · JPL
113807	2002 TB_{209}	—	October 6, 2002	Socorro	LINEAR	·	7.0 km	MPC · JPL
113808	2002 TC_{209}	—	October 6, 2002	Socorro	LINEAR	EOS	5.7 km	MPC · JPL
113809	2002 TC_{210}	—	October 7, 2002	Socorro	LINEAR	·	5.4 km	MPC · JPL
113810	2002 TG_{210}	—	October 7, 2002	Socorro	LINEAR	·	4.2 km	MPC · JPL
113811	2002 TZ_{210}	—	October 7, 2002	Socorro	LINEAR	NYS	2.0 km	MPC · JPL
113812	2002 TK_{211}	—	October 5, 2002	Socorro	LINEAR	·	3.8 km	MPC · JPL
113813	2002 TN_{212}	—	October 7, 2002	Haleakala	NEAT	TIR	3.9 km	MPC · JPL
113814	2002 TG_{213}	—	October 3, 2002	Socorro	LINEAR	·	2.3 km	MPC · JPL
113815	2002 TA_{215}	—	October 4, 2002	Socorro	LINEAR	·	1.1 km	MPC · JPL
113816	2002 TM_{216}	—	October 6, 2002	Socorro	LINEAR	EOS	4.4 km	MPC · JPL
113817	2002 TN_{216}	—	October 6, 2002	Palomar	NEAT	·	8.3 km	MPC · JPL
113818	2002 TR_{216}	—	October 6, 2002	Palomar	NEAT	·	4.1 km	MPC · JPL
113819	2002 TQ_{217}	—	October 8, 2002	Anderson Mesa	LONEOS	EOS	3.7 km	MPC · JPL
113820	2002 TX_{218}	—	October 5, 2002	Socorro	LINEAR	EOS	4.4 km	MPC · JPL
113821	2002 TM_{221}	—	October 6, 2002	Palomar	NEAT	·	2.2 km	MPC · JPL
113822	2002 TS_{221}	—	October 6, 2002	Haleakala	NEAT	EOS	3.9 km	MPC · JPL
113823	2002 TY_{221}	—	October 7, 2002	Anderson Mesa	LONEOS	·	5.1 km	MPC · JPL
113824	2002 TG_{222}	—	October 7, 2002	Socorro	LINEAR	·	2.8 km	MPC · JPL
113825	2002 TS_{223}	—	October 7, 2002	Socorro	LINEAR	·	6.3 km	MPC · JPL
113826	2002 TV_{223}	—	October 7, 2002	Socorro	LINEAR	·	6.2 km	MPC · JPL
113827	2002 TG_{225}	—	October 8, 2002	Anderson Mesa	LONEOS	·	6.0 km	MPC · JPL
113828	2002 TC_{226}	—	October 8, 2002	Anderson Mesa	LONEOS	DOR · fast	5.1 km	MPC · JPL
113829	2002 TN_{226}	—	October 8, 2002	Anderson Mesa	LONEOS	·	6.2 km	MPC · JPL
113830	2002 TA_{227}	—	October 8, 2002	Anderson Mesa	LONEOS	·	1.4 km	MPC · JPL
113831	2002 TC_{227}	—	October 8, 2002	Anderson Mesa	LONEOS	EOS	4.4 km	MPC · JPL
113832	2002 TP_{227}	—	October 8, 2002	Anderson Mesa	LONEOS	·	4.8 km	MPC · JPL
113833	2002 TC_{229}	—	October 7, 2002	Haleakala	NEAT	·	4.0 km	MPC · JPL
113834	2002 TH_{231}	—	October 8, 2002	Palomar	NEAT	·	6.6 km	MPC · JPL
113835	2002 TP_{231}	—	October 8, 2002	Palomar	NEAT	(1118)	8.1 km	MPC · JPL
113836	2002 TR_{231}	—	October 8, 2002	Palomar	NEAT	·	7.2 km	MPC · JPL
113837	2002 TT_{232}	—	October 6, 2002	Socorro	LINEAR	EUN	2.6 km	MPC · JPL
113838	2002 TX_{232}	—	October 6, 2002	Socorro	LINEAR	·	2.6 km	MPC · JPL
113839	2002 TG_{235}	—	October 6, 2002	Socorro	LINEAR	·	6.1 km	MPC · JPL
113840	2002 TH_{236}	—	October 6, 2002	Socorro	LINEAR	·	4.2 km	MPC · JPL
113841	2002 TO_{236}	—	October 6, 2002	Socorro	LINEAR	·	5.0 km	MPC · JPL
113842	2002 TR_{236}	—	October 6, 2002	Socorro	LINEAR	·	9.1 km	MPC · JPL
113843	2002 TG_{237}	—	October 6, 2002	Socorro	LINEAR	·	2.4 km	MPC · JPL
113844	2002 TV_{237}	—	October 6, 2002	Anderson Mesa	LONEOS	EUN	2.3 km	MPC · JPL
113845	2002 TD_{238}	—	October 7, 2002	Socorro	LINEAR	·	3.1 km	MPC · JPL
113846	2002 TV_{239}	—	October 9, 2002	Socorro	LINEAR	fast?	2.8 km	MPC · JPL
113847	2002 TR_{240}	—	October 6, 2002	Palomar	NEAT	·	6.2 km	MPC · JPL
113848	2002 TH_{241}	—	October 7, 2002	Socorro	LINEAR	HYG	5.8 km	MPC · JPL
113849	2002 TL_{241}	—	October 7, 2002	Socorro	LINEAR	·	4.0 km	MPC · JPL
113850	2002 TG_{242}	—	October 9, 2002	Anderson Mesa	LONEOS	EOS	3.7 km	MPC · JPL
113851	2002 TL_{242}	—	October 9, 2002	Anderson Mesa	LONEOS	·	6.1 km	MPC · JPL
113852	2002 TF_{245}	—	October 7, 2002	Haleakala	NEAT	WAT	3.3 km	MPC · JPL
113853	2002 TK_{246}	—	October 9, 2002	Socorro	LINEAR	·	5.4 km	MPC · JPL
113854	2002 TN_{246}	—	October 9, 2002	Socorro	LINEAR	·	5.8 km	MPC · JPL
113855	2002 TL_{249}	—	October 7, 2002	Socorro	LINEAR	KOR	3.0 km	MPC · JPL
113856	2002 TB_{250}	—	October 7, 2002	Socorro	LINEAR	·	2.2 km	MPC · JPL
113857	2002 TT_{250}	—	October 7, 2002	Socorro	LINEAR	·	2.2 km	MPC · JPL
113858	2002 TY_{252}	—	October 8, 2002	Anderson Mesa	LONEOS	·	1.2 km	MPC · JPL
113859	2002 TM_{253}	—	October 8, 2002	Anderson Mesa	LONEOS	EOS	3.1 km	MPC · JPL
113860	2002 TE_{254}	—	October 9, 2002	Anderson Mesa	LONEOS	·	3.8 km	MPC · JPL
113861	2002 TZ_{254}	—	October 9, 2002	Anderson Mesa	LONEOS	·	3.2 km	MPC · JPL
113862	2002 TD_{255}	—	October 9, 2002	Anderson Mesa	LONEOS	LUT	5.3 km	MPC · JPL
113863	2002 TG_{255}	—	October 9, 2002	Anderson Mesa	LONEOS	·	7.3 km	MPC · JPL
113864	2002 TN_{255}	—	October 9, 2002	Socorro	LINEAR	·	3.1 km	MPC · JPL
113865	2002 TR_{255}	—	October 9, 2002	Socorro	LINEAR	·	1.5 km	MPC · JPL
113866	2002 TZ_{256}	—	October 9, 2002	Socorro	LINEAR	·	3.1 km	MPC · JPL
113867	2002 TA_{258}	—	October 9, 2002	Socorro	LINEAR	·	1.4 km	MPC · JPL
113868	2002 TR_{258}	—	October 9, 2002	Socorro	LINEAR	·	1.2 km	MPC · JPL
113869	2002 TV_{258}	—	October 9, 2002	Socorro	LINEAR	·	2.1 km	MPC · JPL
113870	2002 TC_{259}	—	October 9, 2002	Socorro	LINEAR	V	1.2 km	MPC · JPL
113871	2002 TH_{259}	—	October 9, 2002	Socorro	LINEAR	·	2.0 km	MPC · JPL
113872	2002 TM_{259}	—	October 9, 2002	Socorro	LINEAR	VER	5.6 km	MPC · JPL
113873	2002 TT_{259}	—	October 9, 2002	Socorro	LINEAR	·	3.0 km	MPC · JPL
113874	2002 TY_{259}	—	October 9, 2002	Socorro	LINEAR	·	4.3 km	MPC · JPL
113875	2002 TP_{260}	—	October 9, 2002	Socorro	LINEAR	·	1.6 km	MPC · JPL
113876	2002 TE_{261}	—	October 9, 2002	Socorro	LINEAR	·	1.5 km	MPC · JPL
113877	2002 TG_{261}	—	October 9, 2002	Socorro	LINEAR	·	5.4 km	MPC · JPL
113878	2002 TR_{261}	—	October 9, 2002	Socorro	LINEAR	·	3.2 km	MPC · JPL
113879	2002 TB_{262}	—	October 10, 2002	Palomar	NEAT	·	1.5 km	MPC · JPL
113880	2002 TP_{262}	—	October 10, 2002	Palomar	NEAT	·	1.2 km	MPC · JPL
113881	2002 TB_{264}	—	October 10, 2002	Socorro	LINEAR	·	5.7 km	MPC · JPL
113882	2002 TF_{264}	—	October 10, 2002	Socorro	LINEAR	·	3.0 km	MPC · JPL
113883	2002 TD_{265}	—	October 10, 2002	Socorro	LINEAR	V	1.2 km	MPC · JPL
113884	2002 TS_{265}	—	October 10, 2002	Socorro	LINEAR	·	4.0 km	MPC · JPL
113885	2002 TU_{265}	—	October 10, 2002	Socorro	LINEAR	·	2.7 km	MPC · JPL
113886	2002 TG_{266}	—	October 10, 2002	Socorro	LINEAR	fast?	3.7 km	MPC · JPL
113887	2002 TC_{267}	—	October 11, 2002	Socorro	LINEAR	·	2.9 km	MPC · JPL
113888	2002 TG_{267}	—	October 10, 2002	Socorro	LINEAR	PHO	2.6 km	MPC · JPL
113889	2002 TL_{267}	—	October 10, 2002	Socorro	LINEAR	·	5.6 km	MPC · JPL
113890	2002 TA_{270}	—	October 9, 2002	Socorro	LINEAR	·	4.1 km	MPC · JPL
113891	2002 TG_{270}	—	October 9, 2002	Socorro	LINEAR	·	3.5 km	MPC · JPL
113892	2002 TL_{270}	—	October 9, 2002	Socorro	LINEAR	·	4.9 km	MPC · JPL
113893	2002 TN_{270}	—	October 9, 2002	Socorro	LINEAR	·	2.0 km	MPC · JPL
113894	2002 TP_{271}	—	October 9, 2002	Socorro	LINEAR	·	2.6 km	MPC · JPL
113895	2002 TR_{271}	—	October 9, 2002	Socorro	LINEAR	EUN	2.1 km	MPC · JPL
113896	2002 TB_{272}	—	October 9, 2002	Socorro	LINEAR	·	6.0 km	MPC · JPL
113897	2002 TF_{273}	—	October 9, 2002	Socorro	LINEAR	V	1.2 km	MPC · JPL
113898	2002 TT_{273}	—	October 9, 2002	Socorro	LINEAR	·	6.7 km	MPC · JPL
113899	2002 TO_{274}	—	October 9, 2002	Socorro	LINEAR	·	6.7 km	MPC · JPL
113900	2002 TR_{274}	—	October 9, 2002	Socorro	LINEAR	·	3.2 km	MPC · JPL

== 113901–114000 ==
back to top

Designation			Discovery			Properties		Ref
Permanent	Provisional	Named after	Date	Site	Discoverer(s)	Category	Diam.	Ref
113901	2002 TX_{274}	—	October 9, 2002	Socorro	LINEAR	·	1.2 km	MPC · JPL
113902	2002 TK_{276}	—	October 9, 2002	Socorro	LINEAR	·	3.3 km	MPC · JPL
113903	2002 TO_{276}	—	October 9, 2002	Socorro	LINEAR	·	3.8 km	MPC · JPL
113904	2002 TQ_{276}	—	October 9, 2002	Socorro	LINEAR	·	4.5 km	MPC · JPL
113905	2002 TV_{277}	—	October 10, 2002	Socorro	LINEAR	EOS	4.9 km	MPC · JPL
113906	2002 TJ_{278}	—	October 10, 2002	Socorro	LINEAR	·	4.3 km	MPC · JPL
113907	2002 TV_{278}	—	October 10, 2002	Socorro	LINEAR	·	1.4 km	MPC · JPL
113908	2002 TX_{279}	—	October 10, 2002	Socorro	LINEAR	·	2.1 km	MPC · JPL
113909	2002 TC_{280}	—	October 10, 2002	Socorro	LINEAR	·	5.3 km	MPC · JPL
113910	2002 TO_{280}	—	October 10, 2002	Socorro	LINEAR	·	1.9 km	MPC · JPL
113911	2002 TW_{281}	—	October 10, 2002	Socorro	LINEAR	EUN	2.9 km	MPC · JPL
113912	2002 TD_{282}	—	October 10, 2002	Socorro	LINEAR	HYG	7.5 km	MPC · JPL
113913	2002 TJ_{282}	—	October 10, 2002	Socorro	LINEAR	·	3.0 km	MPC · JPL
113914	2002 TF_{284}	—	October 10, 2002	Socorro	LINEAR	V	1.3 km	MPC · JPL
113915	2002 TG_{284}	—	October 10, 2002	Socorro	LINEAR	·	1.3 km	MPC · JPL
113916	2002 TJ_{284}	—	October 10, 2002	Socorro	LINEAR	·	8.4 km	MPC · JPL
113917	2002 TJ_{285}	—	October 10, 2002	Socorro	LINEAR	·	7.0 km	MPC · JPL
113918	2002 TD_{286}	—	October 10, 2002	Socorro	LINEAR	·	1.5 km	MPC · JPL
113919	2002 TF_{286}	—	October 10, 2002	Socorro	LINEAR	·	2.3 km	MPC · JPL
113920	2002 TK_{286}	—	October 10, 2002	Socorro	LINEAR	KRM	5.5 km	MPC · JPL
113921	2002 TZ_{286}	—	October 10, 2002	Socorro	LINEAR	·	2.7 km	MPC · JPL
113922	2002 TD_{287}	—	October 10, 2002	Socorro	LINEAR	·	1.7 km	MPC · JPL
113923	2002 TS_{287}	—	October 10, 2002	Socorro	LINEAR	·	2.5 km	MPC · JPL
113924	2002 TT_{287}	—	October 10, 2002	Socorro	LINEAR	·	5.1 km	MPC · JPL
113925	2002 TD_{288}	—	October 10, 2002	Socorro	LINEAR	EOS	3.9 km	MPC · JPL
113926	2002 TL_{288}	—	October 10, 2002	Socorro	LINEAR	·	8.4 km	MPC · JPL
113927	2002 TT_{288}	—	October 10, 2002	Socorro	LINEAR	·	2.4 km	MPC · JPL
113928	2002 TF_{289}	—	October 10, 2002	Socorro	LINEAR	·	4.9 km	MPC · JPL
113929	2002 TK_{289}	—	October 10, 2002	Socorro	LINEAR	·	4.4 km	MPC · JPL
113930	2002 TN_{289}	—	October 10, 2002	Socorro	LINEAR	·	1.7 km	MPC · JPL
113931	2002 TP_{289}	—	October 10, 2002	Socorro	LINEAR	slow	9.8 km	MPC · JPL
113932	2002 TR_{289}	—	October 10, 2002	Socorro	LINEAR	URS	5.2 km	MPC · JPL
113933	2002 TU_{289}	—	October 10, 2002	Socorro	LINEAR	EUN	2.5 km	MPC · JPL
113934	2002 TD_{291}	—	October 10, 2002	Socorro	LINEAR	·	2.2 km	MPC · JPL
113935	2002 TB_{292}	—	October 10, 2002	Socorro	LINEAR	·	3.7 km	MPC · JPL
113936	2002 TS_{292}	—	October 10, 2002	Socorro	LINEAR	·	1.6 km	MPC · JPL
113937	2002 TM_{293}	—	October 10, 2002	Socorro	LINEAR	·	2.6 km	MPC · JPL
113938	2002 TN_{294}	—	October 12, 2002	Socorro	LINEAR	ADE	6.6 km	MPC · JPL
113939	2002 TO_{294}	—	October 12, 2002	Socorro	LINEAR	·	2.6 km	MPC · JPL
113940	2002 TZ_{294}	—	October 13, 2002	Palomar	NEAT	·	7.2 km	MPC · JPL
113941	2002 TM_{295}	—	October 13, 2002	Palomar	NEAT	EUN	2.8 km	MPC · JPL
113942	2002 TQ_{295}	—	October 13, 2002	Palomar	NEAT	·	2.5 km	MPC · JPL
113943	2002 TV_{295}	—	October 13, 2002	Palomar	NEAT	PHO	3.8 km	MPC · JPL
113944	2002 TP_{296}	—	October 11, 2002	Socorro	LINEAR	·	3.8 km	MPC · JPL
113945	2002 TU_{296}	—	October 11, 2002	Socorro	LINEAR	·	1.4 km	MPC · JPL
113946	2002 TE_{298}	—	October 12, 2002	Socorro	LINEAR	·	2.6 km	MPC · JPL
113947	2002 TT_{300}	—	October 15, 2002	Palomar	NEAT	EOS	3.8 km	MPC · JPL
113948	2002 TZ_{302}	—	October 11, 2002	Socorro	LINEAR	·	1.1 km	MPC · JPL
113949 Bahcall	2002 TV_{313}	Bahcall	October 4, 2002	Apache Point	SDSS	·	7.3 km	MPC · JPL
113950 Donbaldwin	2002 TC_{315}	Donbaldwin	October 4, 2002	Apache Point	SDSS	EOS	2.9 km	MPC · JPL
113951 Artdavidsen	2002 TM_{349}	Artdavidsen	October 10, 2002	Apache Point	SDSS	·	6.5 km	MPC · JPL
113952 Schramm	2002 TM_{352}	Schramm	October 10, 2002	Apache Point	SDSS	·	1.6 km	MPC · JPL
113953	2002 UK	—	October 21, 2002	Palomar	NEAT	·	6.8 km	MPC · JPL
113954	2002 UE_{1}	—	October 28, 2002	Kitt Peak	Spacewatch	EMA	6.4 km	MPC · JPL
113955	2002 UY_{1}	—	October 28, 2002	Haleakala	NEAT	·	4.2 km	MPC · JPL
113956	2002 UJ_{3}	—	October 28, 2002	Palomar	NEAT	EUN	2.2 km	MPC · JPL
113957	2002 UD_{6}	—	October 28, 2002	Palomar	NEAT	EOS	4.0 km	MPC · JPL
113958	2002 UH_{6}	—	October 28, 2002	Palomar	NEAT	EOS	3.6 km	MPC · JPL
113959	2002 UY_{6}	—	October 28, 2002	Palomar	NEAT	·	2.1 km	MPC · JPL
113960	2002 UO_{7}	—	October 28, 2002	Palomar	NEAT	·	2.0 km	MPC · JPL
113961	2002 UB_{8}	—	October 28, 2002	Palomar	NEAT	·	4.3 km	MPC · JPL
113962	2002 UJ_{8}	—	October 28, 2002	Palomar	NEAT	·	5.2 km	MPC · JPL
113963	2002 US_{9}	—	October 26, 2002	Haleakala	NEAT	·	1.7 km	MPC · JPL
113964	2002 UT_{9}	—	October 26, 2002	Haleakala	NEAT	·	3.3 km	MPC · JPL
113965	2002 UV_{9}	—	October 26, 2002	Haleakala	NEAT	·	1.8 km	MPC · JPL
113966	2002 UF_{10}	—	October 28, 2002	Palomar	NEAT	·	5.7 km	MPC · JPL
113967	2002 UO_{12}	—	October 31, 2002	Nogales	Tenagra II	·	2.4 km	MPC · JPL
113968	2002 UO_{13}	—	October 28, 2002	Haleakala	NEAT	·	6.4 km	MPC · JPL
113969	2002 UR_{13}	—	October 28, 2002	Haleakala	NEAT	PHO	1.9 km	MPC · JPL
113970	2002 UF_{15}	—	October 30, 2002	Socorro	LINEAR	EOS	3.4 km	MPC · JPL
113971	2002 UL_{15}	—	October 30, 2002	Palomar	NEAT	·	6.0 km	MPC · JPL
113972	2002 UM_{15}	—	October 30, 2002	Palomar	NEAT	·	2.1 km	MPC · JPL
113973	2002 UP_{15}	—	October 30, 2002	Palomar	NEAT	·	3.2 km	MPC · JPL
113974	2002 UN_{17}	—	October 29, 2002	Nogales	Tenagra II	(1338) (FLO)	1.0 km	MPC · JPL
113975	2002 UO_{18}	—	October 30, 2002	Palomar	NEAT	NYS	1.9 km	MPC · JPL
113976	2002 UM_{19}	—	October 30, 2002	Haleakala	NEAT	·	7.1 km	MPC · JPL
113977	2002 UO_{19}	—	October 30, 2002	Haleakala	NEAT	·	1.9 km	MPC · JPL
113978	2002 UR_{20}	—	October 28, 2002	Haleakala	NEAT	·	1.2 km	MPC · JPL
113979	2002 UA_{22}	—	October 30, 2002	Haleakala	NEAT	·	5.8 km	MPC · JPL
113980	2002 UH_{22}	—	October 30, 2002	Haleakala	NEAT	·	5.7 km	MPC · JPL
113981	2002 UT_{22}	—	October 30, 2002	Haleakala	NEAT	·	1.7 km	MPC · JPL
113982	2002 UW_{22}	—	October 30, 2002	Haleakala	NEAT	·	2.4 km	MPC · JPL
113983	2002 UZ_{22}	—	October 30, 2002	Haleakala	NEAT	NYS	2.4 km	MPC · JPL
113984	2002 UN_{23}	—	October 28, 2002	Palomar	NEAT	·	1.5 km	MPC · JPL
113985	2002 UA_{26}	—	October 30, 2002	Kitt Peak	Spacewatch	EMA	6.0 km	MPC · JPL
113986	2002 UF_{26}	—	October 31, 2002	Socorro	LINEAR	·	7.3 km	MPC · JPL
113987	2002 UO_{26}	—	October 31, 2002	Socorro	LINEAR	·	2.8 km	MPC · JPL
113988	2002 UR_{26}	—	October 31, 2002	Socorro	LINEAR	·	2.7 km	MPC · JPL
113989	2002 UF_{27}	—	October 31, 2002	Palomar	NEAT	PHO	1.6 km	MPC · JPL
113990	2002 UF_{28}	—	October 30, 2002	Palomar	NEAT	·	1.7 km	MPC · JPL
113991	2002 UN_{28}	—	October 30, 2002	Palomar	NEAT	PHO	3.0 km	MPC · JPL
113992	2002 UU_{28}	—	October 31, 2002	Socorro	LINEAR	·	1.1 km	MPC · JPL
113993	2002 UG_{31}	—	October 28, 2002	Haleakala	NEAT	·	1.4 km	MPC · JPL
113994	2002 UN_{32}	—	October 30, 2002	Haleakala	NEAT	·	4.2 km	MPC · JPL
113995	2002 US_{32}	—	October 30, 2002	Haleakala	NEAT	·	2.7 km	MPC · JPL
113996	2002 UA_{33}	—	October 31, 2002	Anderson Mesa	LONEOS	·	1.2 km	MPC · JPL
113997	2002 UH_{33}	—	October 31, 2002	Anderson Mesa	LONEOS	·	1.1 km	MPC · JPL
113998	2002 UK_{33}	—	October 31, 2002	Anderson Mesa	LONEOS	·	1.4 km	MPC · JPL
113999	2002 UO_{33}	—	October 31, 2002	Anderson Mesa	LONEOS	EOS	5.3 km	MPC · JPL
114000	2002 UR_{33}	—	October 31, 2002	Anderson Mesa	LONEOS	·	3.8 km	MPC · JPL

back to top

== See also ==
- Meanings of minor-planet names: 113001–114000
