= Meanings of minor-planet names: 113001–114000 =

As minor planet discoveries are confirmed, they are given a permanent number by the IAU's Minor Planet Center (MPC), and the discoverers can then submit names for them, following the IAU's naming conventions. The list below concerns those minor planets in the specified number-range that have received names, and explains the meanings of those names.

Official naming citations of newly named small Solar System bodies are approved and published in a bulletin by IAU's Working Group for Small Bodies Nomenclature (WGSBN). Before May 2021, citations were published in MPC's Minor Planet Circulars for many decades. Recent citations can also be found on the JPL Small-Body Database (SBDB). Until his death in 2016, German astronomer Lutz D. Schmadel compiled these citations into the Dictionary of Minor Planet Names (DMP) and regularly updated the collection.

Based on Paul Herget's The Names of the Minor Planets, Schmadel also researched the unclear origin of numerous asteroids, most of which had been named prior to World War II. This article incorporates text from this source, which is in the public domain: SBDB New namings may only be added to this list below after official publication as the preannouncement of names is condemned. The WGSBN publishes a comprehensive guideline for the naming rules of non-cometary small Solar System bodies.

== 113001–113100 ==
| Named minor planet | Provisional | This minor planet was named for... | Ref · Catalog |
|---|---|---|---|
There are no named minor planets in this number range

== 113101–113200 ==
back to top

| Named minor planet | Provisional | This minor planet was named for... | Ref · Catalog |
|---|---|---|---|
There are no named minor planets in this number range

== 113201–113300 ==
back to top

| Named minor planet | Provisional | This minor planet was named for... | Ref · Catalog |
|---|---|---|---|
| 113202 Kisslászló | 2002 RY_{111} | László L. Kiss (born 1972), a Hungarian astronomer, a founding member of the Szeged Asteroid Program and a discoverer of minor planets. He is a long-time friend of astronomer Krisztián Sárneczky, who discovered this minor planet. | JPL · 113202 |
| 113203 Szabó | 2002 RC_{112} | Gyula M. Szabó (born 1979), a Hungarian astronomer, a founding member of the Szeged Asteroid Program and a discoverer of minor planets | JPL · 113203 |
| 113208 Lea | 2002 RR_{114} | Lea Bernardi (born 2007), daughter of Italian astronomer Fabrizio Bernardi who discovered this minor planet. | IAU · 113208 |
| 113210 Petrfatka | 2002 RF_{117} | Petr Fatka (b. 1991), a Czech astronomer. | IAU · 113210 |
| 113213 Marcoolmo | 2002 RM_{118} | Marco Olmo (b. 1948), an Italian ultra-marathon runner. | IAU · 113213 |
| 113214 Vinkó | 2002 RT_{118} | József Vinkó (born 1965), a Hungarian astronomer and head of the Bright Supernova Observing Group at the University of Szeged | JPL · 113214 |
| 113219 Thomasmazzi | 2002 RU_{119} | Thomas Mazzi, Italian amateur astronomer. | IAU · 113219 |
| 113237 Samucavicchioli | 2002 RH_{126} | Samuele Cavicchioli, Italian professor of Italian language and literature at Liceo Scientifico Dini, Pisa. | IAU · 113237 |
| 113256 Prüm | 2002 RF_{138} | The German town of Prüm, located in the Eifel region of western Germany | JPL · 113256 |

== 113301–113400 ==
back to top

| Named minor planet | Provisional | This minor planet was named for... | Ref · Catalog |
|---|---|---|---|
| 113333 Tyler | 2002 RR_{211} | David Bruce Valentine Tyler (born 1941), a British amateur astronomer and telescope maker who has assisted others through advice and creating accessories in his workshop. He is known for his solar observations and images. The British Astronomical Association awarded him its Merlin medal in 2012. | JPL · 113333 |
| 113355 Gessler | 2002 RW_{240} | Nick Gessler (born 1945), an American co-director of UCLA's Human Complex Systems Program, and prolific meteorite discoverer | JPL · 113355 |
| 113388 Davidmartinez | 2002 SS_{16} | David Martinez Delgado (born 1970) has searched and characterized the Sagittarius tidal stream and studied this satellite's interaction with our galaxy using theoretical simulations. He also discovered a tidal tail in the Ursa Minor satellite galaxy. | JPL · 113388 |
| 113390 Helvetia | 2002 SU_{19} | Helvetia is the Latin name for Switzerland, where this asteroid was discovered. Helvetia is also an allegorical figure, symbol for the nation. | JPL · 113390 |
| 113394 Niebur | 2002 SN_{21} | Susan Niebur (1978–2012), American astrophysicist and Discovery Program Scientist at NASA (Src) | JPL · 113394 |
| 113395 Curtniebur | 2002 SZ_{21} | Curt Niebur (born 1972), American scientist responsible for NASA's New Frontiers program including the management of the program's first mission, New Horizons (Src) | JPL · 113395 |

== 113401–113500 ==
back to top

| Named minor planet | Provisional | This minor planet was named for... | Ref · Catalog |
|---|---|---|---|
| 113405 Itomori | 2002 SS_{24} | Itomori is a fictional Japanese town depicted in the anime movie Your Name that was destroyed by the impact of a comet fragment. | JPL · 113405 |
| 113415 Rauracia | 2002 SN_{28} | Rauracia, a group of Celts who settled in the Jura area of Switzerland around 400 B.C. and the name of the official anthem of the Swiss canton of Jura. This Hilda asteroid was the first unusual object discovered at the Jurassien-Vicques Observatory. | JPL · 113415 |
| 113461 McCay | 2002 SX_{50} | Winsor McCay (1869–1934) was an American illustrator and one of the first creators of animated films. His best-known works are the cartoon strips Dream of the Rarebit Fiend and Little Nemo in Slumberland, and the animated film Gertie the Dinosaur. In 1996, he was inducted into the Will Eisner Hall of Fame. | JPL · 113461 |

== 113501–113600 ==
back to top

| Named minor planet | Provisional | This minor planet was named for... | Ref · Catalog |
|---|---|---|---|
There are no named minor planets in this number range

== 113601–113700 ==
back to top

| Named minor planet | Provisional | This minor planet was named for... | Ref · Catalog |
|---|---|---|---|
| 113620 Valelucarotti | 2002 TR_{61} | Valentina Lucarotti, Italian professor at the Liceo Scientifico Ulisse Dini in Pisa. | IAU · 113620 |
| 113621 Danielafaggi | 2002 TA_{62} | Daniela Faggi (b. 1982), an Italian geologist. | IAU · 113621 |
| 113622 Serafinacarpino | 2002 TE_{62} | Serafina Carpino (b. 1971), an Italian astronomer. | IAU · 113622 |
| 113623 Stefanovoglino | 2002 TO_{63} | Stefano Voglino, Italian aerospace engineer. | IAU · 113623 |
| 113626 Centorenazzo | 2002 TZ_{65} | Renazzo, a part of the municipality of Cento, in the Emilia Romagna region in Italy. | IAU · 113626 |
| 113659 Faltona | 2002 TQ_{85} | Faltona, an Italian village located in the Pratomagno mountain range of Tuscany | JPL · 113659 |
| 113661 Augustodaolio | 2002 TE_{86} | Augusto Daolio (1947–1992), an Italian singer. | IAU · 113661 |
| 113671 Sacromonte | 2002 TM_{96} | Sacro Monte di Varese is a small mountain just north of the city of Varese, where fourteen chapels and a sanctuary were built between 1604 and 1623, dedicated to the mysteries of the Rosary. Since 2003, Sacro Monte is a UNESCO World Heritage site. | IAU · 113671 |
| 113673 Bettystrickland | 2002 TU_{97} | Elisabetta Strickland (b. 1948), an Italian mathematician. | IAU · 113673 |
| 113683 Robertoornella | 2002 TB_{111} | Roberto Marconcini (b. 1966), an Italian musician. | IAU · 113683 |
| 113684 Giannagianni | 2002 TG_{111} | Gianna Gianni (1963–2020), an Italian amateur astronomer. | IAU · 113684 |

== 113701–113800 ==
back to top

| Named minor planet | Provisional | This minor planet was named for... | Ref · Catalog |
|---|---|---|---|
There are no named minor planets in this number range

== 113801–113900 ==
back to top

| Named minor planet | Provisional | This minor planet was named for... | Ref · Catalog |
|---|---|---|---|
There are no named minor planets in this number range

== 113901–114000 ==
back to top

| Named minor planet | Provisional | This minor planet was named for... | Ref · Catalog |
|---|---|---|---|
| 113949 Bahcall | 2002 TV_{313} | John N. Bahcall (1934–2005), an American astrophysicist | JPL · 113949 |
| 113950 Donbaldwin | 2002 TC_{315} | Donald R. Baldwin (1938–2003), was the co-founder and treasurer of the Astrophysical Research Consortium, important to the Sloan Digital Sky Survey | JPL · 113950 |
| 113951 Artdavidsen | 2002 TM_{349} | Arthur Davidsen (1944–2001), pioneer in the field of ultraviolet spectroscopy | JPL · 113951 |
| 113952 Schramm | 2002 TM_{352} | David Schramm (1945–1997), an American theoretical astrophysicist | JPL · 113952 |

back to top

| Preceded by 112,001–113,000 | Meanings of minor-planet names List of minor planets: 113,001–114,000 | Succeeded by 114,001–115,000 |
