= 113390 Helvetia =

Main-belt asteroid

Discovery
- Discovered by: M. Griesser
- Discovery site: Eschenberg Obs.
- Discovery date: 29 September 2002

Designations
- Pronunciation: /hɛlˈviːʃə/
- Named after: Helvetia (Swiss symbol and national personification)
- Alternative designations: 2002 SU_{19} · 2001 FS_{166}
- Minor planet category: main-belt · (inner) background · Flora

Orbital characteristics
- Epoch 27 April 2019 (JD 2458600.5)
- Uncertainty parameter 0
- Observation arc: 57.45 yr (20,985 d)
- Aphelion: 2.7712 AU
- Perihelion: 1.8353 AU
- Semi-major axis: 2.3033 AU
- Eccentricity: 0.2032
- Orbital period (sidereal): 3.50 yr (1,277 d)
- Mean anomaly: 314.06°
- Mean motion: 0° 16^{m} 55.2^{s} / day
- Inclination: 7.3588°
- Longitude of ascending node: 298.47°
- Argument of perihelion: 8.6509°

Physical characteristics
- Mean diameter: 2.196±0.360
- Geometric albedo: 0.231±0.103
- Spectral type: S (assumed)
- Absolute magnitude (H): 15.5; 15.6

113390 Helvetia (provisional designation 2002 SU_{19}) is a background asteroid from the inner regions of the asteroid belt, approximately 2.2 kilometers (1.4 miles) kilometers in diameter. It was discovered on 29 September 2002, by Swiss astronomer Markus Griesser at the Eschenberg Observatory in Winterthur, near Zürich, Switzerland. The presumed stony Florian asteroid was named after the Swiss national symbol, Helvetia.

== Orbit and classification ==
Helvetia is a non-family asteroid of the main belt's background population when applying the hierarchical clustering method to its proper orbital elements. Based on osculating Keplerian orbital elements, the asteroid has also been classified as a member of the Flora family (402), a giant asteroid family and the largest family of stony asteroids in the main-belt.

It orbits the Sun in the inner main-belt at a distance of 1.8–2.8 AU once every 3 years and 6 months (1,276 days; semi-major axis of 2.3 AU). Its orbits the Sun in the inner main-belt at a distance of 1.8–2.8 AU once every 3 years and 6 months (1,277 days; semi-major axis of 2.3 AU). Its orbit has an eccentricity of 0.20 and an inclination of 7° with respect to the ecliptic. The asteroid's observation arc begins 42 years prior to its official discovery observation, with a precovery taken at the Palomar Observatory in September 1960.

== Naming ==
This minor planet bears the name for Switzerland (Latin: Confoederatio Helvetica), where the asteroid was discovered. Helvetia is also an allegorical figure and symbol for the nation (national personification). Each Swiss stamp carries her name, and her figure appears on most Swiss coins. The official naming citation was published by the Minor Planet Center on 19 February 2006 (M.P.C. 55989).

== Physical characteristics ==
Helvetia is an assumed, stony S-type asteroid, the most common type in the inner main-belt and the Flora family's overall spectral type.

=== Lightcurve ===
In April 2014, Helvetia was photometrically observed by Hungarian astronomers Gyula M. Szabó and Krisztián Sárneczky. However, no rotational lightcurve could be obtained. As of 2019, the asteroid's rotation period and shape still remain unknown.

=== Diameter and albedo ===
According to the survey carried out by the NEOWISE mission of NASA's space-based Wide-field Infrared Survey Explorer, Helvetia measures 2.2 kilometers in diameter and its surface has an albedo of 0.23, which is typical for stony asteroids. The Collaborative Asteroid Lightcurve Link assumes an albedo of 0.24 – derived from 8 Flora, the largest member and namesake of its family – and calculates a diameter of 2.06 kilometers based on an absolute magnitude of 15.6.
