= Eschenberg Observatory =

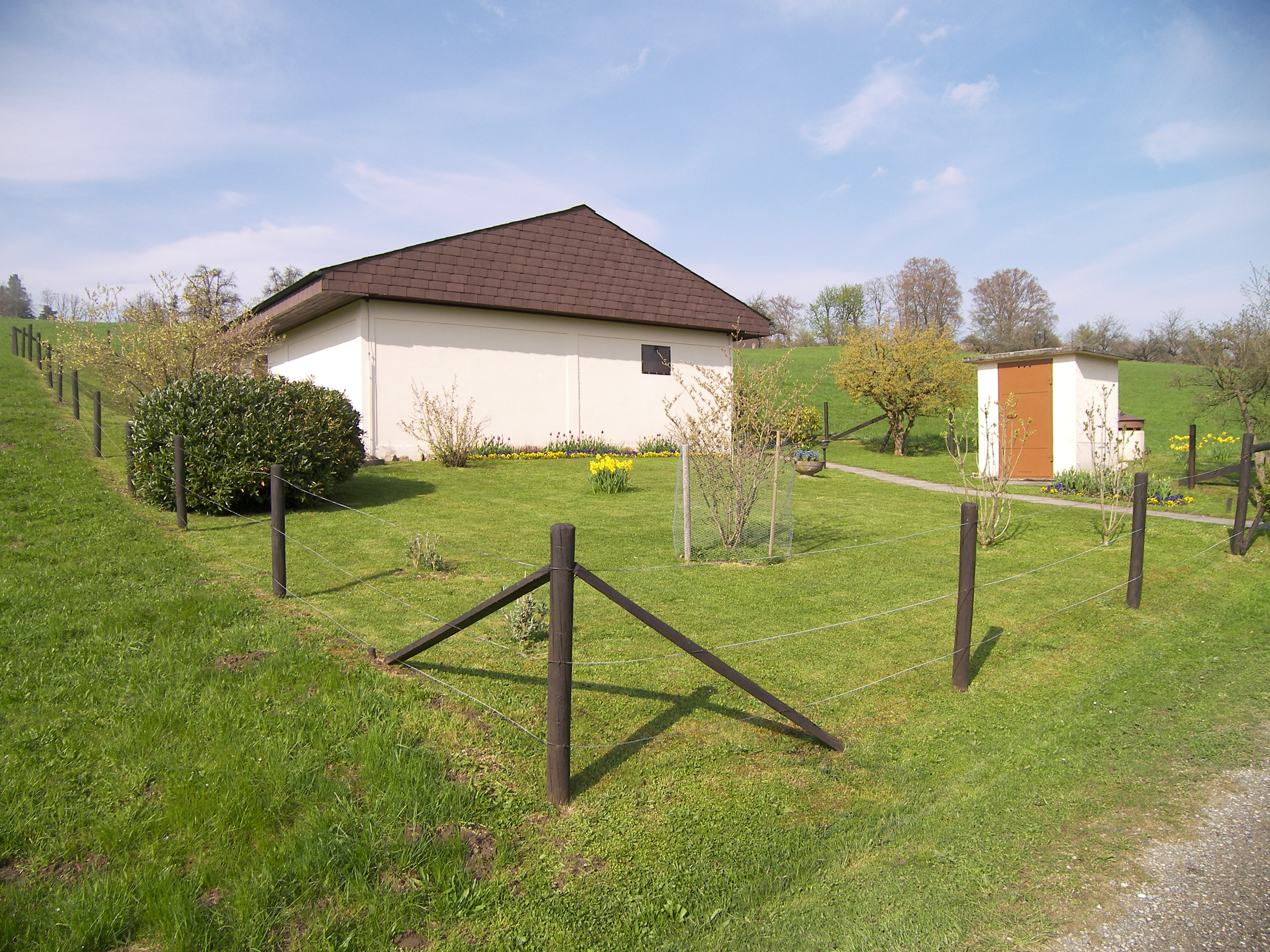
- Organization: Astronomical Society of Winterthur
- Observatory code: 151
- Location: Winterthur, Canton of Zurich, Switzerland
- Coordinates: 47.474694°N 8.742806°E
- Altitude: 542 metres (1,778 ft)
- Established: 1979
- Website: www.eschenberg.ch
- Related media on Commons

Eschenberg Observatory (German: Sternwarte Eschenberg) is an astronomical observatory owned and operated by the Astronomical Society of Winterthur. It is located in northeastern Switzerland in Winterthur and was founded in 1979.

The outer main-belt asteroid 96206 Eschenberg, discovered by Freimut Börngen at the Karl Schwarzschild Observatory in 1992, was named for the observatory. The official naming citation was published by the Minor Planet Center on 9 June 2017 (M.P.C. 105279).

== See also ==
- Markus Griesser (astronomer)
