= Meanings of minor-planet names: 110001–111000 =

As minor planet discoveries are confirmed, they are given a permanent number by the IAU's Minor Planet Center (MPC), and the discoverers can then submit names for them, following the IAU's naming conventions. The list below concerns those minor planets in the specified number-range that have received names, and explains the meanings of those names.

Official naming citations of newly named small Solar System bodies are approved and published in a bulletin by IAU's Working Group for Small Bodies Nomenclature (WGSBN). Before May 2021, citations were published in MPC's Minor Planet Circulars for many decades. Recent citations can also be found on the JPL Small-Body Database (SBDB). Until his death in 2016, German astronomer Lutz D. Schmadel compiled these citations into the Dictionary of Minor Planet Names (DMP) and regularly updated the collection.

Based on Paul Herget's The Names of the Minor Planets, Schmadel also researched the unclear origin of numerous asteroids, most of which had been named prior to World War II. This article incorporates text from this source, which is in the public domain: SBDB New namings may only be added to this list below after official publication as the preannouncement of names is condemned. The WGSBN publishes a comprehensive guideline for the naming rules of non-cometary small Solar System bodies.

== 110001–110100 ==
Named minor planet	Provisional	This minor planet was named for...	Ref · Catalog
110026 Hamill	2001 SH_{73}	Mark Hamill (born 1951) is an American actor most famous for playing Luke Skywalker in the Star Wars films. Hamill has won acclaim as a voice actor, most notably as the Joker, Batman's archenemy. Hamill has appeared in more than 75 films, hundreds of television episodes, and more than 30 video games.	JPL · 110026
110073 Leeonki	2001 SM_{113}	Lee On-ki (born 1994), student at Shun Tak Fraternal Association Yung Ya College	JPL · 110073
110074 Lamchunhei	2001 SP_{113}	Lam Chun Hei (born 1991), student at Shun Tak Fraternal Association Yung Yau College in Hong Kong	JPL · 110074
110077 Pujiquanshan	2001 SC_{114}	Pujiquanshan is the motto of the charitable organization, Sik Sik Yuen, founded in Hong Kong in 1965. "Pujiquanshan" means "Act benevolently and teach benevolence".	JPL · 110077

== 110101–110200 ==
back to top

Named minor planet	Provisional	This minor planet was named for...	Ref · Catalog
There are no named minor planets in this number range

== 110201–110300 ==
back to top

Named minor planet	Provisional	This minor planet was named for...	Ref · Catalog
110288 Libai	2001 SL_{262}	Li Bai (AD 701–762), Chinese poet, member of the group of scholars known as the "Eight Immortals of the Wine Cup" in a poem by fellow poet Du Fu (see 110289)	JPL · 110288
110289 Dufu	2001 SM_{262}	Du Fu (AD 712 – 770), Chinese poet, one of the greatest along with Li Bai (see above)	JPL · 110289
110293 Oia	2001 SE_{265}	Oia, a small town on the Greek island of Santorini, in the south Aegean Sea.	JPL · 110293
110294 Victoriaharbour	2001 SK_{265}	Victoria Harbour, a natural harbor located between Hong Kong Island to the south and Kowloon to the North.	JPL · 110294
110295 Elcalafate	2001 SN_{265}	El Calafate, a city in Patagonia, Argentina.	JPL · 110295
110296 Luxor	2001 SR_{265}	The city of Luxor in Egypt, famous for the ruins of its many temples, monuments and tombs, as well as for the nearby Valley of the Kings and Valley of the Queens.	IAU · 110296
110297 Yellowriver	2001 SH_{266}	The Yellow River in China is the sixth-longest river in the world with an estimated length of 5,464 km.	JPL · 110297
110298 Deceptionisland	2001 ST_{266}	Deception Island, the caldera of an active volcanic island off the Antarctic Peninsula.	JPL · 110298
110299 Iceland	2001 SW_{266}	Iceland is a volcanically and geologically active island in the North Atlantic Ocean. With an area of 103,000 square kilometer and population of about 330,000, it is the most sparsely populated country in Europe.	JPL · 110299
110300 Abusimbel	2001 SB_{267}	The Abu Simbel temples near Abu Simbel on the upper Nile River in southern Egypt	JPL · 110300

== 110301–110400 ==
back to top

Named minor planet	Provisional	This minor planet was named for...	Ref · Catalog
110393 Rammstein	2001 TC_{8}	Rammstein, a German hard rock-metal group from Eastern Germany, named in turn after the city of Ramstein-Miesenbach where the 1988 air show disaster occurred †	JPL · 110393

== 110401–110500 ==
back to top

Named minor planet	Provisional	This minor planet was named for...	Ref · Catalog
110404 Itoemi	2001 TR_{13}	Emi Ito (1941–2012), born Hideyo Ito, was a popular Japanese singer from the late 1950s to the mid-1970s. Together with her identical twin sister, Yumi Ito, they became internationally famous as "The Peanuts". The sisters are perhaps best remembered as the "Mothra fairies" in the first three Mothra movies.	JPL · 110404
110405 Itoyumi	2001 TS_{13}	Yumi Ito (1941–2016), born Tsukiko Ito, was a popular Japanese singer from the late 1950s to the mid-1970s. Together with her identical twin sister, Emi Ito, they became internationally famous as "The Peanuts". The sisters are perhaps best remembered as the "Mothra fairies" in the first three Mothra movies.	JPL · 110405
110408 Nakajima	2001 TJ_{15}	Haruo Nakajima (1929–2017) was a Japanese stunt actor who appeared in films such as Akira Kurosawa's Seven Samurai. Best known as "the man in the suit", Nakajima portrayed Gojira (Godzilla) and other kaiju (fantastic creatures) in 21 movies from Gojira (1954) to Chikyu Kogeki Meirei: Gojira tai Gaigan (1972).	JPL · 110408
110416 Cardille	2001 TU_{18}	Bill Cardille (1928–2016) was a television broadcast personality in Pittsburgh. Starting in 1957, he hosted many programs on WIIC-TV (later WPXI), including Studio Wrestling and a 20-year run on Chiller Theatre. Cardille also appeared in several movies, including Night of the Living Dead.	JPL · 110416

== 110501–110600 ==
back to top

Named minor planet	Provisional	This minor planet was named for...	Ref · Catalog
There are no named minor planets in this number range

== 110601–110700 ==
back to top

Named minor planet	Provisional	This minor planet was named for...	Ref · Catalog
110625 Feryalözel	2001 TL_{155}	Feryal Özel (b. 1975), a Turkish-American astronomer.	IAU · 110625
110627 Psaltis	2001 TP_{160}	Dimitrios Psaltis (b. 1970), a Greek astronomer.	IAU · 110627

== 110701–110800 ==
back to top

Named minor planet	Provisional	This minor planet was named for...	Ref · Catalog
110702 Titostagno	2001 TR_{216}	Tito Stagno (1930-2022) was an Italian TV journalist. As a reporter, he followed the whole series of Apollo missions and in 1969 made live commentary of the landing of the first man on the Moon. Name suggested by M. Morelli and M. Di Martino.	IAU · 110702
110742 Tetuokudo	2001 UP_{1}	Tetuo Kudo (born 1958), staff member of the Goshi Municipal Office and a renowned amateur astronomer	JPL · 110742
110743 Hirobumi	2001 UQ_{1}	Itō Hirobumi (1841–1909), a Japanese statesman who greatly contributed to the modernization of the Japanese political system	JPL · 110743

== 110801–110900 ==
back to top

Named minor planet	Provisional	This minor planet was named for...	Ref · Catalog
There are no named minor planets in this number range

== 110901–111000 ==
back to top

Named minor planet	Provisional	This minor planet was named for...	Ref · Catalog
There are no named minor planets in this number range

back to top

Preceded by 109,001–110,000	Meanings of minor-planet names List of minor planets: 110,001–111,000	Succeeded by 111,001–112,000
