= Tito Stagno =

Italian journalist (1930–2022)

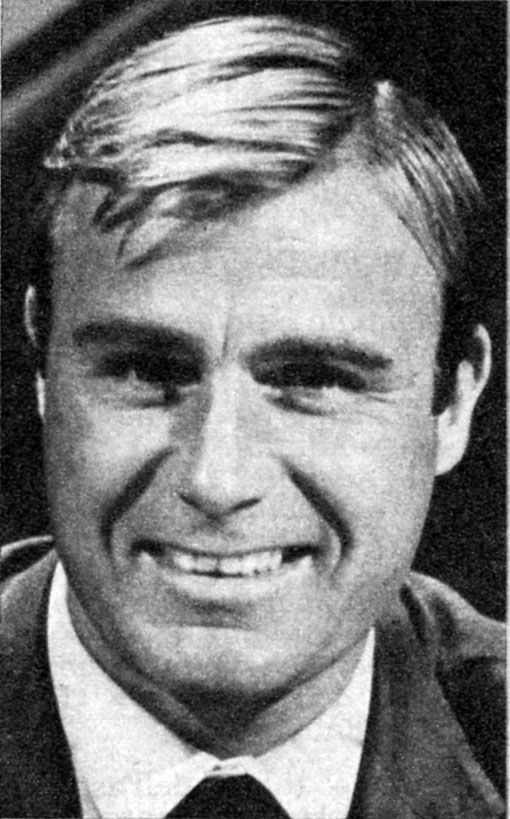
- Stagno in Radiocorriere magazine (1967)
- Born: 4 January 1930; Cagliari, Italy
- Died: 1 February 2022 (aged 92); Rome, Italy
- Occupation: Journalist

Tito Stagno (4 January 1930 – 1 February 2022) was an Italian journalist, television writer and presenter.

== Life and career ==
Born in Cagliari, Sardinia, Stagno started his career as a sports commentator in Radio Cagliari and as a reporter in Radiosera. In 1954 he was employed at RAI, making his official debut one year later with the program Viaggio in Sardegna. Starting from 1956 he specialized as a play-by-play commentator, covering sport, political and space events. He is best known in his home country as the commentator of the 1969 Moon landing.

Stagno was also a television writer of documentaries and sport programs. He was the head of the RAI sport department between 1976 and 1979, and between 1976 and 1995 he was head writer of the long-running Sunday sport program La Domenica Sportiva, which he also hosted for a number of seasons. He named the asteroid 110702 Titostagno. He died on 1 February 2022, at the age of 92.
