= List of minor planets: 110001–111000 =

The following is a partial list of minor planets, running from minor-planet number 110001 through 111000, inclusive. The primary data for this and other partial lists is based on JPL's "Small-Body Orbital Elements" and data available from the Minor Planet Center. Critical list information is also provided by the MPC, unless otherwise specified from Lowell Observatory. A detailed description of the table's columns and additional sources are given on the main page including a complete list of every page in this series, and a statistical break-up on the dynamical classification of minor planets.

Also see the summary list of all named bodies in numerical and alphabetical order, and the corresponding naming citations for the number range of this particular list. New namings may only be added to this list after official publication, as the preannouncement of names is condemned by the Working Group for Small Bodies Nomenclature of the International Astronomical Union.

Near-Earth obj.	MBA (inner)	MBA (outer)	Centaur
Mars-crosser	MBA (middle)	Jupiter trojan	Trans-Neptunian obj.
Unclassified

== 110001–110100 ==
Designation			Discovery			Properties		Ref
Permanent	Provisional	Named after	Date	Site	Discoverer(s)	Category	Diam.	Ref
110001	2001 SP_{63}	—	September 17, 2001	Socorro	LINEAR	HYG	6.9 km	MPC · JPL
110002	2001 SX_{63}	—	September 17, 2001	Socorro	LINEAR	·	5.8 km	MPC · JPL
110003	2001 SE_{64}	—	September 17, 2001	Socorro	LINEAR	·	5.3 km	MPC · JPL
110004	2001 SF_{64}	—	September 17, 2001	Socorro	LINEAR	·	4.7 km	MPC · JPL
110005	2001 SH_{64}	—	September 17, 2001	Socorro	LINEAR	·	3.6 km	MPC · JPL
110006	2001 ST_{65}	—	September 17, 2001	Socorro	LINEAR	MAR ·	1.9 km	MPC · JPL
110007	2001 SU_{65}	—	September 17, 2001	Socorro	LINEAR	·	3.8 km	MPC · JPL
110008	2001 SY_{65}	—	September 17, 2001	Socorro	LINEAR	PAD	3.9 km	MPC · JPL
110009	2001 SW_{66}	—	September 17, 2001	Socorro	LINEAR	·	3.7 km	MPC · JPL
110010	2001 SB_{67}	—	September 17, 2001	Socorro	LINEAR	·	2.4 km	MPC · JPL
110011	2001 SZ_{67}	—	September 17, 2001	Socorro	LINEAR	·	3.4 km	MPC · JPL
110012	2001 SL_{68}	—	September 17, 2001	Socorro	LINEAR	·	4.8 km	MPC · JPL
110013	2001 SN_{68}	—	September 17, 2001	Socorro	LINEAR	·	3.0 km	MPC · JPL
110014	2001 SR_{68}	—	September 17, 2001	Socorro	LINEAR	·	5.7 km	MPC · JPL
110015	2001 SV_{68}	—	September 17, 2001	Socorro	LINEAR	EUN	2.6 km	MPC · JPL
110016	2001 SB_{69}	—	September 17, 2001	Socorro	LINEAR	·	2.6 km	MPC · JPL
110017	2001 SS_{69}	—	September 17, 2001	Socorro	LINEAR	·	2.0 km	MPC · JPL
110018	2001 SA_{70}	—	September 17, 2001	Socorro	LINEAR	MAR	3.1 km	MPC · JPL
110019	2001 SE_{70}	—	September 17, 2001	Socorro	LINEAR	·	4.7 km	MPC · JPL
110020	2001 SM_{71}	—	September 17, 2001	Socorro	LINEAR	·	1.5 km	MPC · JPL
110021	2001 SP_{71}	—	September 17, 2001	Socorro	LINEAR	V	1.6 km	MPC · JPL
110022	2001 SX_{71}	—	September 17, 2001	Socorro	LINEAR	EUN	3.1 km	MPC · JPL
110023	2001 SH_{72}	—	September 17, 2001	Socorro	LINEAR	·	5.7 km	MPC · JPL
110024	2001 SL_{72}	—	September 17, 2001	Socorro	LINEAR	·	6.2 km	MPC · JPL
110025	2001 SN_{72}	—	September 17, 2001	Socorro	LINEAR	·	5.0 km	MPC · JPL
110026 Hamill	2001 SH_{73}	Hamill	September 17, 2001	Goodricke-Pigott	R. A. Tucker	·	4.0 km	MPC · JPL
110027	2001 SD_{74}	—	September 19, 2001	Anderson Mesa	LONEOS	EOS	3.3 km	MPC · JPL
110028	2001 SS_{74}	—	September 19, 2001	Anderson Mesa	LONEOS	·	2.8 km	MPC · JPL
110029	2001 SG_{75}	—	September 19, 2001	Anderson Mesa	LONEOS	·	4.0 km	MPC · JPL
110030	2001 SJ_{75}	—	September 19, 2001	Anderson Mesa	LONEOS	(1101)	7.0 km	MPC · JPL
110031	2001 SX_{75}	—	September 19, 2001	Anderson Mesa	LONEOS	·	8.8 km	MPC · JPL
110032	2001 SD_{76}	—	September 19, 2001	Anderson Mesa	LONEOS	(5)	3.1 km	MPC · JPL
110033	2001 SN_{76}	—	September 16, 2001	Socorro	LINEAR	·	5.4 km	MPC · JPL
110034	2001 SS_{76}	—	September 16, 2001	Socorro	LINEAR	·	1.1 km	MPC · JPL
110035	2001 SX_{78}	—	September 19, 2001	Socorro	LINEAR	·	4.6 km	MPC · JPL
110036	2001 SP_{79}	—	September 20, 2001	Socorro	LINEAR	·	3.7 km	MPC · JPL
110037	2001 SA_{80}	—	September 20, 2001	Socorro	LINEAR	·	1.7 km	MPC · JPL
110038	2001 SX_{80}	—	September 20, 2001	Socorro	LINEAR	·	2.2 km	MPC · JPL
110039	2001 SH_{81}	—	September 20, 2001	Socorro	LINEAR	·	2.0 km	MPC · JPL
110040	2001 SY_{81}	—	September 20, 2001	Socorro	LINEAR	·	2.3 km	MPC · JPL
110041	2001 SJ_{82}	—	September 20, 2001	Socorro	LINEAR	·	2.9 km	MPC · JPL
110042	2001 SL_{82}	—	September 20, 2001	Socorro	LINEAR	·	4.1 km	MPC · JPL
110043	2001 SA_{83}	—	September 20, 2001	Socorro	LINEAR	·	3.2 km	MPC · JPL
110044	2001 SO_{83}	—	September 20, 2001	Socorro	LINEAR	·	2.0 km	MPC · JPL
110045	2001 SD_{87}	—	September 20, 2001	Socorro	LINEAR	·	4.6 km	MPC · JPL
110046	2001 SV_{88}	—	September 20, 2001	Socorro	LINEAR	·	1.8 km	MPC · JPL
110047	2001 SM_{90}	—	September 20, 2001	Socorro	LINEAR	·	1.5 km	MPC · JPL
110048	2001 ST_{91}	—	September 20, 2001	Socorro	LINEAR	·	3.7 km	MPC · JPL
110049	2001 SK_{92}	—	September 20, 2001	Socorro	LINEAR	·	2.3 km	MPC · JPL
110050	2001 SO_{94}	—	September 20, 2001	Socorro	LINEAR	·	3.4 km	MPC · JPL
110051	2001 SE_{95}	—	September 20, 2001	Socorro	LINEAR	V	1.7 km	MPC · JPL
110052	2001 SF_{96}	—	September 20, 2001	Socorro	LINEAR	·	2.6 km	MPC · JPL
110053	2001 SO_{96}	—	September 20, 2001	Socorro	LINEAR	·	4.6 km	MPC · JPL
110054	2001 SH_{98}	—	September 20, 2001	Socorro	LINEAR	EUN	2.3 km	MPC · JPL
110055	2001 SC_{100}	—	September 20, 2001	Socorro	LINEAR	·	4.0 km	MPC · JPL
110056	2001 SB_{103}	—	September 20, 2001	Socorro	LINEAR	·	5.2 km	MPC · JPL
110057	2001 SZ_{103}	—	September 20, 2001	Socorro	LINEAR	·	2.4 km	MPC · JPL
110058	2001 SC_{106}	—	September 20, 2001	Socorro	LINEAR	·	3.9 km	MPC · JPL
110059	2001 SK_{107}	—	September 20, 2001	Socorro	LINEAR	slow	5.0 km	MPC · JPL
110060	2001 SM_{107}	—	September 20, 2001	Socorro	LINEAR	·	3.0 km	MPC · JPL
110061	2001 SF_{108}	—	September 20, 2001	Socorro	LINEAR	·	5.2 km	MPC · JPL
110062	2001 SG_{108}	—	September 20, 2001	Socorro	LINEAR	MAR	2.7 km	MPC · JPL
110063	2001 SV_{108}	—	September 20, 2001	Socorro	LINEAR	·	5.5 km	MPC · JPL
110064	2001 SA_{109}	—	September 20, 2001	Socorro	LINEAR	·	4.7 km	MPC · JPL
110065	2001 SU_{109}	—	September 20, 2001	Socorro	LINEAR	·	11 km	MPC · JPL
110066	2001 SW_{109}	—	September 20, 2001	Socorro	LINEAR	·	5.3 km	MPC · JPL
110067	2001 SH_{110}	—	September 20, 2001	Socorro	LINEAR	EOS	3.7 km	MPC · JPL
110068	2001 SR_{110}	—	September 20, 2001	Socorro	LINEAR	·	1.9 km	MPC · JPL
110069	2001 SC_{111}	—	September 20, 2001	Socorro	LINEAR	GEF	2.7 km	MPC · JPL
110070	2001 SZ_{111}	—	September 20, 2001	Socorro	LINEAR	DOR	7.6 km	MPC · JPL
110071	2001 SA_{112}	—	September 20, 2001	Socorro	LINEAR	·	5.3 km	MPC · JPL
110072	2001 SB_{112}	—	September 20, 2001	Socorro	LINEAR	·	2.7 km	MPC · JPL
110073 Leeonki	2001 SM_{113}	Leeonki	September 20, 2001	Desert Eagle	W. K. Y. Yeung	·	4.2 km	MPC · JPL
110074 Lamchunhei	2001 SP_{113}	Lamchunhei	September 20, 2001	Desert Eagle	W. K. Y. Yeung	(5)	2.0 km	MPC · JPL
110075	2001 SR_{113}	—	September 20, 2001	Desert Eagle	W. K. Y. Yeung	·	2.3 km	MPC · JPL
110076	2001 SW_{113}	—	September 20, 2001	Desert Eagle	W. K. Y. Yeung	·	2.4 km	MPC · JPL
110077 Pujiquanshan	2001 SC_{114}	Pujiquanshan	September 20, 2001	Desert Eagle	W. K. Y. Yeung	·	2.5 km	MPC · JPL
110078	2001 SH_{114}	—	September 20, 2001	Desert Eagle	W. K. Y. Yeung	·	6.7 km	MPC · JPL
110079	2001 SR_{114}	—	September 20, 2001	Desert Eagle	W. K. Y. Yeung	·	2.2 km	MPC · JPL
110080	2001 SV_{114}	—	September 20, 2001	Desert Eagle	W. K. Y. Yeung	·	3.7 km	MPC · JPL
110081	2001 SK_{115}	—	September 20, 2001	Desert Eagle	W. K. Y. Yeung	·	4.0 km	MPC · JPL
110082	2001 SN_{115}	—	September 18, 2001	Desert Eagle	W. K. Y. Yeung	·	2.9 km	MPC · JPL
110083	2001 SV_{115}	—	September 20, 2001	Socorro	LINEAR	·	2.4 km	MPC · JPL
110084	2001 SP_{116}	—	September 16, 2001	Socorro	LINEAR	·	4.3 km	MPC · JPL
110085	2001 SE_{117}	—	September 16, 2001	Socorro	LINEAR	·	2.6 km	MPC · JPL
110086	2001 ST_{117}	—	September 16, 2001	Socorro	LINEAR	·	3.4 km	MPC · JPL
110087	2001 SW_{117}	—	September 16, 2001	Socorro	LINEAR	·	3.1 km	MPC · JPL
110088	2001 SG_{120}	—	September 16, 2001	Socorro	LINEAR	·	3.3 km	MPC · JPL
110089	2001 ST_{120}	—	September 16, 2001	Socorro	LINEAR	WIT	1.5 km	MPC · JPL
110090	2001 SV_{120}	—	September 16, 2001	Socorro	LINEAR	·	2.1 km	MPC · JPL
110091	2001 SW_{120}	—	September 16, 2001	Socorro	LINEAR	·	5.2 km	MPC · JPL
110092	2001 SC_{121}	—	September 16, 2001	Socorro	LINEAR	(5)	2.3 km	MPC · JPL
110093	2001 SJ_{121}	—	September 16, 2001	Socorro	LINEAR	·	5.0 km	MPC · JPL
110094	2001 SP_{121}	—	September 16, 2001	Socorro	LINEAR	·	5.7 km	MPC · JPL
110095	2001 SO_{122}	—	September 16, 2001	Socorro	LINEAR	·	2.5 km	MPC · JPL
110096	2001 SW_{122}	—	September 16, 2001	Socorro	LINEAR	EOS	3.7 km	MPC · JPL
110097	2001 SD_{123}	—	September 16, 2001	Socorro	LINEAR	EOS	4.7 km	MPC · JPL
110098	2001 SK_{124}	—	September 16, 2001	Socorro	LINEAR	·	3.1 km	MPC · JPL
110099	2001 SY_{124}	—	September 16, 2001	Socorro	LINEAR	·	5.0 km	MPC · JPL
110100	2001 SZ_{124}	—	September 16, 2001	Socorro	LINEAR	·	2.7 km	MPC · JPL

== 110101–110200 ==
back to top

Designation			Discovery			Properties		Ref
Permanent	Provisional	Named after	Date	Site	Discoverer(s)	Category	Diam.	Ref
110101	2001 SG_{125}	—	September 16, 2001	Socorro	LINEAR	·	2.8 km	MPC · JPL
110102	2001 SM_{126}	—	September 16, 2001	Socorro	LINEAR	·	2.0 km	MPC · JPL
110103	2001 SZ_{126}	—	September 16, 2001	Socorro	LINEAR	·	5.8 km	MPC · JPL
110104	2001 SS_{129}	—	September 16, 2001	Socorro	LINEAR	·	5.5 km	MPC · JPL
110105	2001 SK_{131}	—	September 16, 2001	Socorro	LINEAR	·	4.3 km	MPC · JPL
110106	2001 SO_{131}	—	September 16, 2001	Socorro	LINEAR	·	4.3 km	MPC · JPL
110107	2001 SY_{131}	—	September 16, 2001	Socorro	LINEAR	·	2.1 km	MPC · JPL
110108	2001 SR_{132}	—	September 16, 2001	Socorro	LINEAR	HYG	4.1 km	MPC · JPL
110109	2001 SC_{134}	—	September 16, 2001	Socorro	LINEAR	·	4.4 km	MPC · JPL
110110	2001 SP_{135}	—	September 16, 2001	Socorro	LINEAR	·	2.0 km	MPC · JPL
110111	2001 SW_{135}	—	September 16, 2001	Socorro	LINEAR	·	3.5 km	MPC · JPL
110112	2001 SA_{136}	—	September 16, 2001	Socorro	LINEAR	3:2	8.4 km	MPC · JPL
110113	2001 SM_{136}	—	September 16, 2001	Socorro	LINEAR	·	1.6 km	MPC · JPL
110114	2001 SP_{136}	—	September 16, 2001	Socorro	LINEAR	·	2.8 km	MPC · JPL
110115	2001 SQ_{136}	—	September 16, 2001	Socorro	LINEAR	HYG	6.4 km	MPC · JPL
110116	2001 SE_{138}	—	September 16, 2001	Socorro	LINEAR	·	2.4 km	MPC · JPL
110117	2001 SK_{138}	—	September 16, 2001	Socorro	LINEAR	·	3.0 km	MPC · JPL
110118	2001 SO_{138}	—	September 16, 2001	Socorro	LINEAR	·	3.6 km	MPC · JPL
110119	2001 SP_{138}	—	September 16, 2001	Socorro	LINEAR	slow	2.8 km	MPC · JPL
110120	2001 SQ_{138}	—	September 16, 2001	Socorro	LINEAR	·	2.5 km	MPC · JPL
110121	2001 ST_{138}	—	September 16, 2001	Socorro	LINEAR	·	4.8 km	MPC · JPL
110122	2001 SD_{139}	—	September 16, 2001	Socorro	LINEAR	·	4.7 km	MPC · JPL
110123	2001 SK_{140}	—	September 16, 2001	Socorro	LINEAR	(5)	3.4 km	MPC · JPL
110124	2001 SX_{140}	—	September 16, 2001	Socorro	LINEAR	·	2.3 km	MPC · JPL
110125	2001 SF_{141}	—	September 16, 2001	Socorro	LINEAR	·	3.9 km	MPC · JPL
110126	2001 SS_{144}	—	September 16, 2001	Socorro	LINEAR	·	3.4 km	MPC · JPL
110127	2001 SN_{145}	—	September 16, 2001	Socorro	LINEAR	·	3.5 km	MPC · JPL
110128	2001 SP_{145}	—	September 16, 2001	Socorro	LINEAR	·	5.1 km	MPC · JPL
110129	2001 SV_{146}	—	September 16, 2001	Socorro	LINEAR	·	4.9 km	MPC · JPL
110130	2001 SP_{147}	—	September 17, 2001	Socorro	LINEAR	·	5.3 km	MPC · JPL
110131	2001 SX_{147}	—	September 17, 2001	Socorro	LINEAR	·	3.1 km	MPC · JPL
110132	2001 SA_{148}	—	September 17, 2001	Socorro	LINEAR	·	6.6 km	MPC · JPL
110133	2001 SJ_{148}	—	September 17, 2001	Socorro	LINEAR	·	2.0 km	MPC · JPL
110134	2001 SF_{149}	—	September 17, 2001	Socorro	LINEAR	·	1.9 km	MPC · JPL
110135	2001 SJ_{149}	—	September 17, 2001	Socorro	LINEAR	·	3.5 km	MPC · JPL
110136	2001 SX_{150}	—	September 17, 2001	Socorro	LINEAR	PAD	3.0 km	MPC · JPL
110137	2001 SA_{151}	—	September 17, 2001	Socorro	LINEAR	·	2.3 km	MPC · JPL
110138	2001 SB_{151}	—	September 17, 2001	Socorro	LINEAR	HNS	2.8 km	MPC · JPL
110139	2001 SC_{151}	—	September 17, 2001	Socorro	LINEAR	·	6.9 km	MPC · JPL
110140	2001 SN_{151}	—	September 17, 2001	Socorro	LINEAR	·	7.1 km	MPC · JPL
110141	2001 SP_{151}	—	September 17, 2001	Socorro	LINEAR	·	4.3 km	MPC · JPL
110142	2001 SX_{151}	—	September 17, 2001	Socorro	LINEAR	·	4.6 km	MPC · JPL
110143	2001 SZ_{151}	—	September 17, 2001	Socorro	LINEAR	·	2.8 km	MPC · JPL
110144	2001 SX_{152}	—	September 17, 2001	Socorro	LINEAR	NEM	3.8 km	MPC · JPL
110145	2001 SR_{153}	—	September 17, 2001	Socorro	LINEAR	·	2.9 km	MPC · JPL
110146	2001 SO_{154}	—	September 17, 2001	Socorro	LINEAR	(5)	1.6 km	MPC · JPL
110147	2001 SW_{154}	—	September 17, 2001	Socorro	LINEAR	EUN	2.2 km	MPC · JPL
110148	2001 SG_{155}	—	September 17, 2001	Socorro	LINEAR	KOR	2.8 km	MPC · JPL
110149	2001 SP_{155}	—	September 17, 2001	Socorro	LINEAR	·	2.3 km	MPC · JPL
110150	2001 ST_{155}	—	September 17, 2001	Socorro	LINEAR	·	3.3 km	MPC · JPL
110151	2001 SU_{156}	—	September 17, 2001	Socorro	LINEAR	·	1.9 km	MPC · JPL
110152	2001 SA_{157}	—	September 17, 2001	Socorro	LINEAR	·	4.1 km	MPC · JPL
110153	2001 SV_{158}	—	September 17, 2001	Socorro	LINEAR	·	7.4 km	MPC · JPL
110154	2001 SZ_{158}	—	September 17, 2001	Socorro	LINEAR	·	4.8 km	MPC · JPL
110155	2001 SB_{159}	—	September 17, 2001	Socorro	LINEAR	·	2.9 km	MPC · JPL
110156	2001 SK_{159}	—	September 17, 2001	Socorro	LINEAR	·	3.4 km	MPC · JPL
110157	2001 SQ_{159}	—	September 17, 2001	Socorro	LINEAR	·	2.7 km	MPC · JPL
110158	2001 SU_{159}	—	September 17, 2001	Socorro	LINEAR	·	2.6 km	MPC · JPL
110159	2001 SF_{160}	—	September 17, 2001	Socorro	LINEAR	AGN	2.1 km	MPC · JPL
110160	2001 SG_{161}	—	September 17, 2001	Socorro	LINEAR	·	2.2 km	MPC · JPL
110161	2001 SU_{161}	—	September 17, 2001	Socorro	LINEAR	·	3.0 km	MPC · JPL
110162	2001 SF_{162}	—	September 17, 2001	Socorro	LINEAR	PAD	3.8 km	MPC · JPL
110163	2001 SN_{162}	—	September 17, 2001	Socorro	LINEAR	·	2.3 km	MPC · JPL
110164	2001 SO_{164}	—	September 17, 2001	Socorro	LINEAR	·	3.6 km	MPC · JPL
110165	2001 SD_{166}	—	September 19, 2001	Socorro	LINEAR	·	3.0 km	MPC · JPL
110166	2001 SZ_{166}	—	September 19, 2001	Socorro	LINEAR	EUN	2.1 km	MPC · JPL
110167	2001 SD_{168}	—	September 19, 2001	Socorro	LINEAR	·	5.8 km	MPC · JPL
110168	2001 SM_{168}	—	September 19, 2001	Socorro	LINEAR	·	3.3 km	MPC · JPL
110169	2001 SD_{169}	—	September 19, 2001	Socorro	LINEAR	·	3.6 km	MPC · JPL
110170	2001 SP_{171}	—	September 16, 2001	Socorro	LINEAR	·	4.3 km	MPC · JPL
110171	2001 SU_{171}	—	September 16, 2001	Socorro	LINEAR	·	8.2 km	MPC · JPL
110172	2001 SW_{171}	—	September 16, 2001	Socorro	LINEAR	·	7.1 km	MPC · JPL
110173	2001 SF_{173}	—	September 16, 2001	Socorro	LINEAR	EUN	2.7 km	MPC · JPL
110174	2001 SH_{173}	—	September 16, 2001	Socorro	LINEAR	WIT	1.8 km	MPC · JPL
110175	2001 SL_{173}	—	September 16, 2001	Socorro	LINEAR	·	5.5 km	MPC · JPL
110176	2001 SS_{173}	—	September 16, 2001	Socorro	LINEAR	·	3.0 km	MPC · JPL
110177	2001 SX_{173}	—	September 16, 2001	Socorro	LINEAR	·	2.4 km	MPC · JPL
110178	2001 SA_{174}	—	September 16, 2001	Socorro	LINEAR	·	3.1 km	MPC · JPL
110179	2001 SF_{175}	—	September 16, 2001	Socorro	LINEAR	·	2.8 km	MPC · JPL
110180	2001 SH_{175}	—	September 16, 2001	Socorro	LINEAR	·	2.2 km	MPC · JPL
110181	2001 SQ_{175}	—	September 16, 2001	Socorro	LINEAR	VER	6.0 km	MPC · JPL
110182	2001 SO_{176}	—	September 16, 2001	Socorro	LINEAR	EUN	2.4 km	MPC · JPL
110183	2001 SB_{177}	—	September 16, 2001	Socorro	LINEAR	(5)	1.9 km	MPC · JPL
110184	2001 SH_{177}	—	September 16, 2001	Socorro	LINEAR	·	2.0 km	MPC · JPL
110185	2001 SV_{177}	—	September 16, 2001	Socorro	LINEAR	·	2.0 km	MPC · JPL
110186	2001 SC_{178}	—	September 17, 2001	Socorro	LINEAR	·	2.8 km	MPC · JPL
110187	2001 SE_{178}	—	September 17, 2001	Socorro	LINEAR	·	5.8 km	MPC · JPL
110188	2001 ST_{178}	—	September 17, 2001	Socorro	LINEAR	·	4.4 km	MPC · JPL
110189	2001 SH_{179}	—	September 17, 2001	Socorro	LINEAR	·	7.2 km	MPC · JPL
110190	2001 SJ_{179}	—	September 17, 2001	Socorro	LINEAR	·	4.3 km	MPC · JPL
110191	2001 SA_{187}	—	September 19, 2001	Socorro	LINEAR	·	2.4 km	MPC · JPL
110192	2001 SN_{187}	—	September 19, 2001	Socorro	LINEAR	·	7.0 km	MPC · JPL
110193	2001 SF_{189}	—	September 19, 2001	Socorro	LINEAR	·	4.3 km	MPC · JPL
110194	2001 SU_{190}	—	September 19, 2001	Socorro	LINEAR	THM	4.8 km	MPC · JPL
110195	2001 SJ_{192}	—	September 19, 2001	Socorro	LINEAR	THM	4.8 km	MPC · JPL
110196	2001 SL_{194}	—	September 19, 2001	Socorro	LINEAR	·	2.4 km	MPC · JPL
110197	2001 SQ_{196}	—	September 19, 2001	Socorro	LINEAR	·	5.5 km	MPC · JPL
110198	2001 SV_{196}	—	September 19, 2001	Socorro	LINEAR	CYB	8.3 km	MPC · JPL
110199	2001 SX_{196}	—	September 19, 2001	Socorro	LINEAR	·	2.9 km	MPC · JPL
110200	2001 SR_{199}	—	September 19, 2001	Socorro	LINEAR	·	1.8 km	MPC · JPL

== 110201–110300 ==
back to top

Designation			Discovery			Properties		Ref
Permanent	Provisional	Named after	Date	Site	Discoverer(s)	Category	Diam.	Ref
110201	2001 SJ_{201}	—	September 19, 2001	Socorro	LINEAR	HNS	2.1 km	MPC · JPL
110202	2001 SR_{201}	—	September 19, 2001	Socorro	LINEAR	·	2.1 km	MPC · JPL
110203	2001 SU_{203}	—	September 19, 2001	Socorro	LINEAR	·	3.8 km	MPC · JPL
110204	2001 SH_{204}	—	September 19, 2001	Socorro	LINEAR	·	2.3 km	MPC · JPL
110205	2001 SA_{206}	—	September 19, 2001	Socorro	LINEAR	CYB	8.5 km	MPC · JPL
110206	2001 SN_{207}	—	September 19, 2001	Socorro	LINEAR	·	4.2 km	MPC · JPL
110207	2001 SO_{210}	—	September 19, 2001	Socorro	LINEAR	·	2.4 km	MPC · JPL
110208	2001 SA_{211}	—	September 19, 2001	Socorro	LINEAR	·	2.4 km	MPC · JPL
110209	2001 SM_{212}	—	September 19, 2001	Socorro	LINEAR	HOF	4.6 km	MPC · JPL
110210	2001 SB_{214}	—	September 19, 2001	Socorro	LINEAR	·	3.0 km	MPC · JPL
110211	2001 SQ_{214}	—	September 19, 2001	Socorro	LINEAR	VER	6.3 km	MPC · JPL
110212	2001 SR_{214}	—	September 19, 2001	Socorro	LINEAR	GEF	2.9 km	MPC · JPL
110213	2001 SN_{215}	—	September 19, 2001	Socorro	LINEAR	·	3.2 km	MPC · JPL
110214	2001 SZ_{216}	—	September 19, 2001	Socorro	LINEAR	EOS	3.6 km	MPC · JPL
110215	2001 SR_{219}	—	September 19, 2001	Socorro	LINEAR	·	3.5 km	MPC · JPL
110216	2001 SX_{219}	—	September 19, 2001	Socorro	LINEAR	·	4.3 km	MPC · JPL
110217	2001 ST_{220}	—	September 19, 2001	Socorro	LINEAR	·	2.7 km	MPC · JPL
110218	2001 SE_{221}	—	September 19, 2001	Socorro	LINEAR	·	2.5 km	MPC · JPL
110219	2001 SV_{221}	—	September 19, 2001	Socorro	LINEAR	·	2.9 km	MPC · JPL
110220	2001 SX_{221}	—	September 19, 2001	Socorro	LINEAR	·	5.3 km	MPC · JPL
110221	2001 SB_{222}	—	September 19, 2001	Socorro	LINEAR	GEF ·	5.6 km	MPC · JPL
110222	2001 SK_{223}	—	September 19, 2001	Socorro	LINEAR	THM	3.4 km	MPC · JPL
110223	2001 SL_{224}	—	September 19, 2001	Socorro	LINEAR	·	2.7 km	MPC · JPL
110224	2001 SO_{224}	—	September 19, 2001	Socorro	LINEAR	·	6.6 km	MPC · JPL
110225	2001 SW_{224}	—	September 19, 2001	Socorro	LINEAR	(5)	1.7 km	MPC · JPL
110226	2001 SF_{225}	—	September 19, 2001	Socorro	LINEAR	·	2.3 km	MPC · JPL
110227	2001 SP_{225}	—	September 19, 2001	Socorro	LINEAR	·	3.6 km	MPC · JPL
110228	2001 SZ_{225}	—	September 19, 2001	Socorro	LINEAR	·	2.7 km	MPC · JPL
110229	2001 SW_{226}	—	September 19, 2001	Socorro	LINEAR	·	4.4 km	MPC · JPL
110230	2001 SW_{227}	—	September 19, 2001	Socorro	LINEAR	·	2.1 km	MPC · JPL
110231	2001 SJ_{228}	—	September 19, 2001	Socorro	LINEAR	·	3.1 km	MPC · JPL
110232	2001 SM_{228}	—	September 19, 2001	Socorro	LINEAR	·	7.6 km	MPC · JPL
110233	2001 SE_{229}	—	September 19, 2001	Socorro	LINEAR	·	4.8 km	MPC · JPL
110234	2001 SG_{230}	—	September 19, 2001	Socorro	LINEAR	·	5.9 km	MPC · JPL
110235	2001 SP_{230}	—	September 19, 2001	Socorro	LINEAR	(43176)	5.4 km	MPC · JPL
110236	2001 SQ_{230}	—	September 19, 2001	Socorro	LINEAR	·	5.0 km	MPC · JPL
110237	2001 SW_{230}	—	September 19, 2001	Socorro	LINEAR	·	2.4 km	MPC · JPL
110238	2001 SC_{232}	—	September 19, 2001	Socorro	LINEAR	·	2.1 km	MPC · JPL
110239	2001 SN_{232}	—	September 19, 2001	Socorro	LINEAR	MRX	1.5 km	MPC · JPL
110240	2001 ST_{232}	—	September 19, 2001	Socorro	LINEAR	·	2.5 km	MPC · JPL
110241	2001 SW_{232}	—	September 19, 2001	Socorro	LINEAR	EUN	2.6 km	MPC · JPL
110242	2001 SS_{233}	—	September 19, 2001	Socorro	LINEAR	KOR	2.3 km	MPC · JPL
110243	2001 SV_{233}	—	September 19, 2001	Socorro	LINEAR	·	3.8 km	MPC · JPL
110244	2001 SZ_{233}	—	September 19, 2001	Socorro	LINEAR	·	3.9 km	MPC · JPL
110245	2001 ST_{234}	—	September 19, 2001	Socorro	LINEAR	·	1.8 km	MPC · JPL
110246	2001 SJ_{235}	—	September 19, 2001	Socorro	LINEAR	·	3.3 km	MPC · JPL
110247	2001 SK_{235}	—	September 19, 2001	Socorro	LINEAR	·	1.9 km	MPC · JPL
110248	2001 SU_{235}	—	September 19, 2001	Socorro	LINEAR	THM	6.2 km	MPC · JPL
110249	2001 SG_{236}	—	September 19, 2001	Socorro	LINEAR	·	2.8 km	MPC · JPL
110250	2001 SX_{236}	—	September 19, 2001	Socorro	LINEAR	·	3.1 km	MPC · JPL
110251	2001 SB_{238}	—	September 19, 2001	Socorro	LINEAR	HYG	4.9 km	MPC · JPL
110252	2001 SZ_{238}	—	September 19, 2001	Socorro	LINEAR	·	2.0 km	MPC · JPL
110253	2001 SK_{239}	—	September 19, 2001	Socorro	LINEAR	·	2.0 km	MPC · JPL
110254	2001 ST_{239}	—	September 19, 2001	Socorro	LINEAR	VER	4.2 km	MPC · JPL
110255	2001 SY_{239}	—	September 19, 2001	Socorro	LINEAR	NEM	4.3 km	MPC · JPL
110256	2001 SM_{240}	—	September 19, 2001	Socorro	LINEAR	·	1.6 km	MPC · JPL
110257	2001 SS_{240}	—	September 19, 2001	Socorro	LINEAR	V	1.5 km	MPC · JPL
110258	2001 SW_{241}	—	September 19, 2001	Socorro	LINEAR	AST	3.9 km	MPC · JPL
110259	2001 SN_{243}	—	September 19, 2001	Socorro	LINEAR	·	1.5 km	MPC · JPL
110260	2001 SM_{245}	—	September 19, 2001	Socorro	LINEAR	(21344)	3.2 km	MPC · JPL
110261	2001 SD_{246}	—	September 19, 2001	Socorro	LINEAR	·	1.8 km	MPC · JPL
110262	2001 SH_{246}	—	September 19, 2001	Socorro	LINEAR	·	6.3 km	MPC · JPL
110263	2001 SQ_{247}	—	September 19, 2001	Socorro	LINEAR	·	3.2 km	MPC · JPL
110264	2001 SH_{248}	—	September 19, 2001	Socorro	LINEAR	·	2.3 km	MPC · JPL
110265	2001 SM_{248}	—	September 19, 2001	Socorro	LINEAR	·	4.8 km	MPC · JPL
110266	2001 SR_{248}	—	September 19, 2001	Socorro	LINEAR	THM	2.9 km	MPC · JPL
110267	2001 SU_{248}	—	September 19, 2001	Socorro	LINEAR	·	2.8 km	MPC · JPL
110268	2001 SZ_{248}	—	September 19, 2001	Socorro	LINEAR	slow	6.1 km	MPC · JPL
110269	2001 SD_{249}	—	September 19, 2001	Socorro	LINEAR	·	2.3 km	MPC · JPL
110270	2001 SQ_{249}	—	September 19, 2001	Socorro	LINEAR	·	3.0 km	MPC · JPL
110271	2001 SD_{250}	—	September 19, 2001	Socorro	LINEAR	·	3.7 km	MPC · JPL
110272	2001 SR_{251}	—	September 19, 2001	Socorro	LINEAR	·	3.0 km	MPC · JPL
110273	2001 SX_{251}	—	September 19, 2001	Socorro	LINEAR	GEF	2.3 km	MPC · JPL
110274	2001 SD_{252}	—	September 19, 2001	Socorro	LINEAR	NEM ·	2.9 km	MPC · JPL
110275	2001 SO_{252}	—	September 19, 2001	Socorro	LINEAR	·	2.5 km	MPC · JPL
110276	2001 SW_{252}	—	September 19, 2001	Socorro	LINEAR	(5)	3.4 km	MPC · JPL
110277	2001 SK_{253}	—	September 19, 2001	Socorro	LINEAR	·	3.7 km	MPC · JPL
110278	2001 SW_{253}	—	September 19, 2001	Socorro	LINEAR	·	3.4 km	MPC · JPL
110279	2001 SM_{254}	—	September 19, 2001	Socorro	LINEAR	·	2.7 km	MPC · JPL
110280	2001 SS_{254}	—	September 19, 2001	Socorro	LINEAR	·	2.4 km	MPC · JPL
110281	2001 SW_{254}	—	September 19, 2001	Socorro	LINEAR	·	3.6 km	MPC · JPL
110282	2001 SD_{257}	—	September 19, 2001	Socorro	LINEAR	·	2.9 km	MPC · JPL
110283	2001 SO_{257}	—	September 19, 2001	Socorro	LINEAR	·	4.2 km	MPC · JPL
110284	2001 SD_{259}	—	September 20, 2001	Socorro	LINEAR	·	1.3 km	MPC · JPL
110285	2001 SD_{260}	—	September 20, 2001	Socorro	LINEAR	·	5.3 km	MPC · JPL
110286	2001 SA_{261}	—	September 20, 2001	Socorro	LINEAR	·	2.4 km	MPC · JPL
110287	2001 SF_{261}	—	September 20, 2001	Socorro	LINEAR	·	6.2 km	MPC · JPL
110288 Libai	2001 SL_{262}	Libai	September 23, 2001	Desert Eagle	W. K. Y. Yeung	NYS	3.0 km	MPC · JPL
110289 Dufu	2001 SM_{262}	Dufu	September 23, 2001	Desert Eagle	W. K. Y. Yeung	·	8.1 km	MPC · JPL
110290	2001 SN_{262}	—	September 23, 2001	Desert Eagle	W. K. Y. Yeung	·	3.6 km	MPC · JPL
110291	2001 SB_{263}	—	September 25, 2001	Desert Eagle	W. K. Y. Yeung	·	6.2 km	MPC · JPL
110292	2001 SC_{265}	—	September 25, 2001	Desert Eagle	W. K. Y. Yeung	·	4.0 km	MPC · JPL
110293 Oia	2001 SE_{265}	Oia	September 25, 2001	Desert Eagle	W. K. Y. Yeung	·	3.0 km	MPC · JPL
110294 Victoriaharbour	2001 SK_{265}	Victoriaharbour	September 25, 2001	Desert Eagle	W. K. Y. Yeung	·	3.2 km	MPC · JPL
110295 Elcalafate	2001 SN_{265}	Elcalafate	September 25, 2001	Desert Eagle	W. K. Y. Yeung	·	3.8 km	MPC · JPL
110296 Luxor	2001 SR_{265}	Luxor	September 25, 2001	Desert Eagle	W. K. Y. Yeung	·	4.2 km	MPC · JPL
110297 Yellowriver	2001 SH_{266}	Yellowriver	September 25, 2001	Desert Eagle	W. K. Y. Yeung	THM	4.5 km	MPC · JPL
110298 Deceptionisland	2001 ST_{266}	Deceptionisland	September 25, 2001	Desert Eagle	W. K. Y. Yeung	·	1.1 km	MPC · JPL
110299 Iceland	2001 SW_{266}	Iceland	September 25, 2001	Desert Eagle	W. K. Y. Yeung	WIT	1.9 km	MPC · JPL
110300 Abusimbel	2001 SB_{267}	Abusimbel	September 25, 2001	Desert Eagle	W. K. Y. Yeung	·	4.5 km	MPC · JPL

== 110301–110400 ==
back to top

Designation			Discovery			Properties		Ref
Permanent	Provisional	Named after	Date	Site	Discoverer(s)	Category	Diam.	Ref
110301	2001 SC_{270}	—	September 18, 2001	Palomar	NEAT	·	3.6 km	MPC · JPL
110302	2001 SM_{270}	—	September 26, 2001	Fountain Hills	C. W. Juels, P. R. Holvorcem	·	2.5 km	MPC · JPL
110303	2001 SR_{270}	—	September 16, 2001	Palomar	NEAT	·	3.0 km	MPC · JPL
110304	2001 SV_{270}	—	September 16, 2001	Palomar	NEAT	GEF	2.5 km	MPC · JPL
110305	2001 SP_{272}	—	September 21, 2001	Socorro	LINEAR	·	4.4 km	MPC · JPL
110306	2001 SW_{272}	—	September 26, 2001	Anderson Mesa	LONEOS	H	1.2 km	MPC · JPL
110307	2001 SQ_{273}	—	September 19, 2001	Kitt Peak	Spacewatch	KOR	2.2 km	MPC · JPL
110308	2001 SW_{276}	—	September 21, 2001	Palomar	NEAT	·	4.8 km	MPC · JPL
110309	2001 SK_{277}	—	September 21, 2001	Anderson Mesa	LONEOS	·	4.2 km	MPC · JPL
110310	2001 SX_{277}	—	September 21, 2001	Anderson Mesa	LONEOS	·	7.2 km	MPC · JPL
110311	2001 SL_{278}	—	September 21, 2001	Anderson Mesa	LONEOS	·	3.6 km	MPC · JPL
110312	2001 SF_{279}	—	September 21, 2001	Anderson Mesa	LONEOS	·	5.0 km	MPC · JPL
110313	2001 SG_{279}	—	September 21, 2001	Anderson Mesa	LONEOS	WIT	2.0 km	MPC · JPL
110314	2001 SQ_{279}	—	September 21, 2001	Anderson Mesa	LONEOS	·	3.4 km	MPC · JPL
110315	2001 SR_{279}	—	September 21, 2001	Anderson Mesa	LONEOS	·	3.0 km	MPC · JPL
110316	2001 SZ_{279}	—	September 21, 2001	Anderson Mesa	LONEOS	AGN	2.7 km	MPC · JPL
110317	2001 SE_{280}	—	September 21, 2001	Anderson Mesa	LONEOS	·	3.4 km	MPC · JPL
110318	2001 SL_{280}	—	September 21, 2001	Anderson Mesa	LONEOS	·	5.7 km	MPC · JPL
110319	2001 SZ_{280}	—	September 21, 2001	Anderson Mesa	LONEOS	·	1.7 km	MPC · JPL
110320	2001 SD_{281}	—	September 21, 2001	Anderson Mesa	LONEOS	·	2.3 km	MPC · JPL
110321	2001 SH_{281}	—	September 21, 2001	Anderson Mesa	LONEOS	(5)	2.3 km	MPC · JPL
110322	2001 SR_{281}	—	September 21, 2001	Anderson Mesa	LONEOS	·	3.3 km	MPC · JPL
110323	2001 SH_{282}	—	September 27, 2001	Socorro	LINEAR	(14916)	6.7 km	MPC · JPL
110324	2001 SV_{282}	—	September 22, 2001	Socorro	LINEAR	EUN	4.0 km	MPC · JPL
110325	2001 SZ_{285}	—	September 28, 2001	Fountain Hills	C. W. Juels, P. R. Holvorcem	·	4.5 km	MPC · JPL
110326	2001 SN_{286}	—	September 21, 2001	Palomar	NEAT	·	2.0 km	MPC · JPL
110327	2001 SP_{286}	—	September 22, 2001	Palomar	NEAT	·	3.5 km	MPC · JPL
110328	2001 SQ_{286}	—	September 22, 2001	Palomar	NEAT	·	2.9 km	MPC · JPL
110329	2001 ST_{287}	—	September 22, 2001	Palomar	NEAT	·	9.3 km	MPC · JPL
110330	2001 SY_{287}	—	September 27, 2001	Palomar	NEAT	·	2.8 km	MPC · JPL
110331	2001 SE_{289}	—	September 23, 2001	Goodricke-Pigott	R. A. Tucker	·	3.7 km	MPC · JPL
110332	2001 SP_{289}	—	September 25, 2001	Goodricke-Pigott	R. A. Tucker	·	5.1 km	MPC · JPL
110333	2001 SS_{290}	—	September 25, 2001	Goodricke-Pigott	R. A. Tucker	WAT	4.8 km	MPC · JPL
110334	2001 SM_{291}	—	September 21, 2001	Anderson Mesa	LONEOS	·	3.8 km	MPC · JPL
110335	2001 SN_{291}	—	September 17, 2001	Anderson Mesa	LONEOS	EUN	3.8 km	MPC · JPL
110336	2001 SO_{291}	—	September 17, 2001	Anderson Mesa	LONEOS	·	3.6 km	MPC · JPL
110337	2001 SP_{291}	—	September 17, 2001	Anderson Mesa	LONEOS	·	7.0 km	MPC · JPL
110338	2001 SW_{291}	—	September 17, 2001	Anderson Mesa	LONEOS	·	7.7 km	MPC · JPL
110339	2001 SY_{291}	—	September 17, 2001	Anderson Mesa	LONEOS	MAR	2.4 km	MPC · JPL
110340	2001 SC_{292}	—	September 23, 2001	Anderson Mesa	LONEOS	·	3.0 km	MPC · JPL
110341	2001 SD_{292}	—	September 23, 2001	Anderson Mesa	LONEOS	EUN	1.5 km	MPC · JPL
110342	2001 SN_{292}	—	September 16, 2001	Socorro	LINEAR	·	2.3 km	MPC · JPL
110343	2001 SW_{292}	—	September 16, 2001	Socorro	LINEAR	·	5.0 km	MPC · JPL
110344	2001 SG_{294}	—	September 20, 2001	Socorro	LINEAR	·	5.7 km	MPC · JPL
110345	2001 SK_{295}	—	September 20, 2001	Socorro	LINEAR	·	1.5 km	MPC · JPL
110346	2001 SJ_{297}	—	September 20, 2001	Socorro	LINEAR	·	4.0 km	MPC · JPL
110347	2001 SK_{299}	—	September 20, 2001	Socorro	LINEAR	·	2.3 km	MPC · JPL
110348	2001 SK_{306}	—	September 20, 2001	Socorro	LINEAR	·	2.3 km	MPC · JPL
110349	2001 ST_{313}	—	September 21, 2001	Socorro	LINEAR	EOS	5.2 km	MPC · JPL
110350	2001 SO_{314}	—	September 23, 2001	Socorro	LINEAR	HYG	5.5 km	MPC · JPL
110351	2001 SR_{314}	—	September 23, 2001	Socorro	LINEAR	·	2.3 km	MPC · JPL
110352	2001 SY_{314}	—	September 25, 2001	Socorro	LINEAR	EOS	4.4 km	MPC · JPL
110353	2001 SZ_{314}	—	September 25, 2001	Socorro	LINEAR	HNS	2.3 km	MPC · JPL
110354	2001 SO_{315}	—	September 25, 2001	Socorro	LINEAR	ADE	4.8 km	MPC · JPL
110355	2001 SJ_{316}	—	September 25, 2001	Socorro	LINEAR	·	3.8 km	MPC · JPL
110356	2001 SM_{316}	—	September 25, 2001	Socorro	LINEAR	(194)	3.2 km	MPC · JPL
110357	2001 SZ_{316}	—	September 25, 2001	Anderson Mesa	LONEOS	·	7.5 km	MPC · JPL
110358	2001 SA_{317}	—	September 25, 2001	Palomar	NEAT	·	8.2 km	MPC · JPL
110359	2001 SA_{318}	—	September 19, 2001	Socorro	LINEAR	L5	10 km	MPC · JPL
110360	2001 SY_{322}	—	September 25, 2001	Socorro	LINEAR	·	2.7 km	MPC · JPL
110361	2001 SF_{324}	—	September 26, 2001	Socorro	LINEAR	·	3.9 km	MPC · JPL
110362	2001 SJ_{324}	—	September 16, 2001	Palomar	NEAT	·	4.4 km	MPC · JPL
110363	2001 SH_{325}	—	September 16, 2001	Socorro	LINEAR	·	4.1 km	MPC · JPL
110364	2001 SJ_{325}	—	September 16, 2001	Socorro	LINEAR	GEF	4.9 km	MPC · JPL
110365	2001 SR_{325}	—	September 17, 2001	Anderson Mesa	LONEOS	EOS	3.9 km	MPC · JPL
110366	2001 SX_{325}	—	September 17, 2001	Anderson Mesa	LONEOS	EUN	2.2 km	MPC · JPL
110367	2001 SE_{327}	—	September 18, 2001	Palomar	NEAT	·	2.4 km	MPC · JPL
110368	2001 SH_{327}	—	September 18, 2001	Anderson Mesa	LONEOS	EUN	2.2 km	MPC · JPL
110369	2001 SJ_{327}	—	September 18, 2001	Palomar	NEAT	ADE	6.1 km	MPC · JPL
110370	2001 SM_{327}	—	September 18, 2001	Palomar	NEAT	·	4.1 km	MPC · JPL
110371	2001 SR_{328}	—	September 19, 2001	Anderson Mesa	LONEOS	EUN	2.0 km	MPC · JPL
110372	2001 SX_{328}	—	September 19, 2001	Anderson Mesa	LONEOS	·	2.8 km	MPC · JPL
110373	2001 SM_{329}	—	September 19, 2001	Socorro	LINEAR	·	3.8 km	MPC · JPL
110374	2001 SF_{332}	—	September 19, 2001	Kitt Peak	Spacewatch	·	7.0 km	MPC · JPL
110375	2001 SR_{334}	—	September 20, 2001	Socorro	LINEAR	NYS	2.3 km	MPC · JPL
110376	2001 SS_{339}	—	September 21, 2001	Anderson Mesa	LONEOS	EUN	2.9 km	MPC · JPL
110377	2001 SU_{341}	—	September 21, 2001	Palomar	NEAT	·	2.1 km	MPC · JPL
110378	2001 SB_{343}	—	September 22, 2001	Palomar	NEAT	·	2.2 km	MPC · JPL
110379	2001 SC_{343}	—	September 22, 2001	Palomar	NEAT	·	3.5 km	MPC · JPL
110380	2001 SO_{343}	—	September 22, 2001	Palomar	NEAT	L5	16 km	MPC · JPL
110381	2001 SJ_{345}	—	September 23, 2001	Anderson Mesa	LONEOS	EUN	3.4 km	MPC · JPL
110382	2001 SJ_{348}	—	September 26, 2001	Socorro	LINEAR	·	3.5 km	MPC · JPL
110383	2001 SO_{350}	—	September 23, 2001	Anderson Mesa	LONEOS	·	3.4 km	MPC · JPL
110384	2001 TM_{1}	—	October 11, 2001	Farpoint	Farpoint	·	5.7 km	MPC · JPL
110385	2001 TL_{2}	—	October 6, 2001	Palomar	NEAT	GEF	2.2 km	MPC · JPL
110386	2001 TG_{3}	—	October 7, 2001	Palomar	NEAT	LEO	3.0 km	MPC · JPL
110387	2001 TQ_{3}	—	October 7, 2001	Palomar	NEAT	·	2.8 km	MPC · JPL
110388	2001 TN_{4}	—	October 7, 2001	Palomar	NEAT	·	2.6 km	MPC · JPL
110389	2001 TD_{6}	—	October 10, 2001	Palomar	NEAT	NEM · fast	3.4 km	MPC · JPL
110390	2001 TE_{6}	—	October 10, 2001	Palomar	NEAT	·	5.0 km	MPC · JPL
110391	2001 TS_{7}	—	October 11, 2001	Desert Eagle	W. K. Y. Yeung	(3025)	8.7 km	MPC · JPL
110392	2001 TA_{8}	—	October 11, 2001	Desert Eagle	W. K. Y. Yeung	MIS	4.2 km	MPC · JPL
110393 Rammstein	2001 TC_{8}	Rammstein	October 11, 2001	Le Creusot	J.-C. Merlin	·	4.5 km	MPC · JPL
110394	2001 TE_{8}	—	October 9, 2001	Socorro	LINEAR	·	7.8 km	MPC · JPL
110395	2001 TO_{8}	—	October 9, 2001	Socorro	LINEAR	EUN	2.9 km	MPC · JPL
110396	2001 TK_{9}	—	October 11, 2001	Socorro	LINEAR	·	2.3 km	MPC · JPL
110397	2001 TO_{9}	—	October 13, 2001	Socorro	LINEAR	·	3.8 km	MPC · JPL
110398	2001 TU_{9}	—	October 13, 2001	Socorro	LINEAR	·	4.2 km	MPC · JPL
110399	2001 TR_{10}	—	October 13, 2001	Socorro	LINEAR	·	2.9 km	MPC · JPL
110400	2001 TW_{10}	—	October 13, 2001	Socorro	LINEAR	·	3.0 km	MPC · JPL

== 110401–110500 ==
back to top

Designation			Discovery			Properties		Ref
Permanent	Provisional	Named after	Date	Site	Discoverer(s)	Category	Diam.	Ref
110401	2001 TW_{11}	—	October 13, 2001	Socorro	LINEAR	NEM	3.8 km	MPC · JPL
110402	2001 TL_{12}	—	October 13, 2001	Socorro	LINEAR	(5)	2.5 km	MPC · JPL
110403	2001 TX_{12}	—	October 11, 2001	Socorro	LINEAR	PHO	2.6 km	MPC · JPL
110404 Itoemi	2001 TR_{13}	Itoemi	October 11, 2001	Goodricke-Pigott	R. A. Tucker	·	6.4 km	MPC · JPL
110405 Itoyumi	2001 TS_{13}	Itoyumi	October 12, 2001	Goodricke-Pigott	R. A. Tucker	EUN	2.2 km	MPC · JPL
110406	2001 TJ_{14}	—	October 6, 2001	Palomar	NEAT	·	3.3 km	MPC · JPL
110407	2001 TU_{14}	—	October 7, 2001	Palomar	NEAT	PAD	3.8 km	MPC · JPL
110408 Nakajima	2001 TJ_{15}	Nakajima	October 13, 2001	Goodricke-Pigott	R. A. Tucker	·	3.1 km	MPC · JPL
110409	2001 TM_{15}	—	October 11, 2001	Socorro	LINEAR	·	2.8 km	MPC · JPL
110410	2001 TP_{15}	—	October 11, 2001	Socorro	LINEAR	slow	3.0 km	MPC · JPL
110411	2001 TQ_{15}	—	October 11, 2001	Socorro	LINEAR	MAR	2.5 km	MPC · JPL
110412	2001 TS_{15}	—	October 11, 2001	Socorro	LINEAR	EUN	2.5 km	MPC · JPL
110413	2001 TA_{16}	—	October 11, 2001	Socorro	LINEAR	·	2.9 km	MPC · JPL
110414	2001 TM_{16}	—	October 11, 2001	Socorro	LINEAR	TIR	5.8 km	MPC · JPL
110415	2001 TS_{17}	—	October 14, 2001	Desert Eagle	W. K. Y. Yeung	·	5.7 km	MPC · JPL
110416 Cardille	2001 TU_{18}	Cardille	October 11, 2001	Goodricke-Pigott	R. A. Tucker	·	6.9 km	MPC · JPL
110417	2001 TG_{19}	—	October 9, 2001	Socorro	LINEAR	·	3.5 km	MPC · JPL
110418	2001 TK_{19}	—	October 9, 2001	Socorro	LINEAR	·	4.0 km	MPC · JPL
110419	2001 TS_{19}	—	October 9, 2001	Socorro	LINEAR	GEF	2.6 km	MPC · JPL
110420	2001 TE_{20}	—	October 9, 2001	Socorro	LINEAR	·	4.4 km	MPC · JPL
110421	2001 TM_{20}	—	October 9, 2001	Socorro	LINEAR	·	3.3 km	MPC · JPL
110422	2001 TZ_{20}	—	October 9, 2001	Socorro	LINEAR	EUN	3.9 km	MPC · JPL
110423	2001 TJ_{21}	—	October 9, 2001	Socorro	LINEAR	·	4.5 km	MPC · JPL
110424	2001 TK_{21}	—	October 11, 2001	Socorro	LINEAR	·	2.2 km	MPC · JPL
110425	2001 TB_{24}	—	October 14, 2001	Socorro	LINEAR	·	2.9 km	MPC · JPL
110426	2001 TF_{24}	—	October 14, 2001	Socorro	LINEAR	HOF	4.5 km	MPC · JPL
110427	2001 TE_{25}	—	October 14, 2001	Socorro	LINEAR	·	5.1 km	MPC · JPL
110428	2001 TA_{26}	—	October 14, 2001	Socorro	LINEAR	·	2.6 km	MPC · JPL
110429	2001 TB_{26}	—	October 14, 2001	Socorro	LINEAR	·	4.5 km	MPC · JPL
110430	2001 TF_{26}	—	October 14, 2001	Socorro	LINEAR	·	2.7 km	MPC · JPL
110431	2001 TK_{26}	—	October 14, 2001	Socorro	LINEAR	HOF	5.5 km	MPC · JPL
110432	2001 TE_{27}	—	October 14, 2001	Socorro	LINEAR	·	4.0 km	MPC · JPL
110433	2001 TJ_{27}	—	October 14, 2001	Socorro	LINEAR	·	2.4 km	MPC · JPL
110434	2001 TK_{27}	—	October 14, 2001	Socorro	LINEAR	·	2.6 km	MPC · JPL
110435	2001 TD_{28}	—	October 14, 2001	Socorro	LINEAR	·	3.4 km	MPC · JPL
110436	2001 TR_{28}	—	October 14, 2001	Socorro	LINEAR	·	3.1 km	MPC · JPL
110437	2001 TD_{29}	—	October 14, 2001	Socorro	LINEAR	MAR	2.1 km	MPC · JPL
110438	2001 TG_{29}	—	October 14, 2001	Socorro	LINEAR	·	3.6 km	MPC · JPL
110439	2001 TW_{29}	—	October 14, 2001	Socorro	LINEAR	·	2.4 km	MPC · JPL
110440	2001 TA_{31}	—	October 14, 2001	Socorro	LINEAR	·	4.2 km	MPC · JPL
110441	2001 TP_{35}	—	October 14, 2001	Socorro	LINEAR	·	6.1 km	MPC · JPL
110442	2001 TQ_{36}	—	October 14, 2001	Socorro	LINEAR	·	3.2 km	MPC · JPL
110443	2001 TA_{37}	—	October 14, 2001	Socorro	LINEAR	RAF	2.0 km	MPC · JPL
110444	2001 TC_{37}	—	October 14, 2001	Socorro	LINEAR	·	2.9 km	MPC · JPL
110445	2001 TG_{37}	—	October 14, 2001	Socorro	LINEAR	(5)	2.6 km	MPC · JPL
110446	2001 TP_{37}	—	October 14, 2001	Socorro	LINEAR	ADE	6.2 km	MPC · JPL
110447	2001 TB_{38}	—	October 14, 2001	Socorro	LINEAR	·	4.0 km	MPC · JPL
110448	2001 TP_{38}	—	October 14, 2001	Socorro	LINEAR	·	3.7 km	MPC · JPL
110449	2001 TA_{39}	—	October 14, 2001	Socorro	LINEAR	·	3.2 km	MPC · JPL
110450	2001 TL_{41}	—	October 14, 2001	Socorro	LINEAR	·	2.9 km	MPC · JPL
110451	2001 TQ_{41}	—	October 14, 2001	Socorro	LINEAR	EUN	4.1 km	MPC · JPL
110452	2001 TA_{42}	—	October 14, 2001	Socorro	LINEAR	·	4.4 km	MPC · JPL
110453	2001 TF_{42}	—	October 14, 2001	Socorro	LINEAR	·	4.0 km	MPC · JPL
110454	2001 TL_{42}	—	October 14, 2001	Socorro	LINEAR	·	5.1 km	MPC · JPL
110455	2001 TO_{42}	—	October 14, 2001	Socorro	LINEAR	DOR	4.5 km	MPC · JPL
110456	2001 TO_{44}	—	October 14, 2001	Socorro	LINEAR	(18466)	5.2 km	MPC · JPL
110457	2001 TT_{45}	—	October 13, 2001	Socorro	LINEAR	·	1.8 km	MPC · JPL
110458	2001 TM_{46}	—	October 15, 2001	Socorro	LINEAR	·	3.0 km	MPC · JPL
110459	2001 TX_{46}	—	October 15, 2001	Desert Eagle	W. K. Y. Yeung	·	4.2 km	MPC · JPL
110460	2001 TZ_{46}	—	October 15, 2001	Desert Eagle	W. K. Y. Yeung	·	3.3 km	MPC · JPL
110461	2001 TD_{47}	—	October 15, 2001	Desert Eagle	W. K. Y. Yeung	·	2.1 km	MPC · JPL
110462	2001 TC_{49}	—	October 14, 2001	Desert Eagle	W. K. Y. Yeung	KOR	3.4 km	MPC · JPL
110463	2001 TE_{50}	—	October 13, 2001	Socorro	LINEAR	EUN	2.0 km	MPC · JPL
110464	2001 TH_{50}	—	October 13, 2001	Socorro	LINEAR	·	3.3 km	MPC · JPL
110465	2001 TT_{51}	—	October 13, 2001	Socorro	LINEAR	·	7.4 km	MPC · JPL
110466	2001 TZ_{51}	—	October 13, 2001	Socorro	LINEAR	(5)	2.4 km	MPC · JPL
110467	2001 TH_{52}	—	October 13, 2001	Socorro	LINEAR	·	1.7 km	MPC · JPL
110468	2001 TH_{53}	—	October 13, 2001	Socorro	LINEAR	·	2.5 km	MPC · JPL
110469	2001 TG_{54}	—	October 14, 2001	Socorro	LINEAR	HNS	2.7 km	MPC · JPL
110470	2001 TJ_{54}	—	October 14, 2001	Socorro	LINEAR	·	2.7 km	MPC · JPL
110471	2001 TH_{55}	—	October 14, 2001	Socorro	LINEAR	MRX	2.7 km	MPC · JPL
110472	2001 TK_{55}	—	October 14, 2001	Socorro	LINEAR	PAD ·	4.0 km	MPC · JPL
110473	2001 TY_{55}	—	October 15, 2001	Socorro	LINEAR	·	3.7 km	MPC · JPL
110474	2001 TA_{56}	—	October 15, 2001	Socorro	LINEAR	·	4.3 km	MPC · JPL
110475	2001 TD_{56}	—	October 15, 2001	Socorro	LINEAR	·	4.0 km	MPC · JPL
110476	2001 TJ_{56}	—	October 15, 2001	Socorro	LINEAR	CYB	6.3 km	MPC · JPL
110477	2001 TM_{56}	—	October 15, 2001	Socorro	LINEAR	·	2.6 km	MPC · JPL
110478	2001 TT_{57}	—	October 13, 2001	Socorro	LINEAR	·	2.2 km	MPC · JPL
110479	2001 TL_{58}	—	October 13, 2001	Socorro	LINEAR	PAD	5.0 km	MPC · JPL
110480	2001 TO_{58}	—	October 13, 2001	Socorro	LINEAR	·	4.8 km	MPC · JPL
110481	2001 TR_{58}	—	October 13, 2001	Socorro	LINEAR	·	3.2 km	MPC · JPL
110482	2001 TG_{59}	—	October 13, 2001	Socorro	LINEAR	·	3.7 km	MPC · JPL
110483	2001 TU_{59}	—	October 13, 2001	Socorro	LINEAR	(5)	2.9 km	MPC · JPL
110484	2001 TP_{60}	—	October 13, 2001	Socorro	LINEAR	·	2.7 km	MPC · JPL
110485	2001 TZ_{60}	—	October 13, 2001	Socorro	LINEAR	·	3.1 km	MPC · JPL
110486	2001 TC_{61}	—	October 13, 2001	Socorro	LINEAR	·	2.4 km	MPC · JPL
110487	2001 TW_{61}	—	October 13, 2001	Socorro	LINEAR	·	2.8 km	MPC · JPL
110488	2001 TX_{61}	—	October 13, 2001	Socorro	LINEAR	·	2.9 km	MPC · JPL
110489	2001 TO_{62}	—	October 13, 2001	Socorro	LINEAR	·	3.1 km	MPC · JPL
110490	2001 TZ_{62}	—	October 13, 2001	Socorro	LINEAR	·	1.5 km	MPC · JPL
110491	2001 TD_{63}	—	October 13, 2001	Socorro	LINEAR	·	4.1 km	MPC · JPL
110492	2001 TE_{63}	—	October 13, 2001	Socorro	LINEAR	·	5.3 km	MPC · JPL
110493	2001 TX_{63}	—	October 13, 2001	Socorro	LINEAR	·	3.2 km	MPC · JPL
110494	2001 TZ_{63}	—	October 13, 2001	Socorro	LINEAR	EUN	2.3 km	MPC · JPL
110495	2001 TB_{64}	—	October 13, 2001	Socorro	LINEAR	·	5.5 km	MPC · JPL
110496	2001 TL_{64}	—	October 13, 2001	Socorro	LINEAR	·	2.1 km	MPC · JPL
110497	2001 TP_{64}	—	October 13, 2001	Socorro	LINEAR	·	3.8 km	MPC · JPL
110498	2001 TG_{65}	—	October 13, 2001	Socorro	LINEAR	·	2.9 km	MPC · JPL
110499	2001 TN_{65}	—	October 13, 2001	Socorro	LINEAR	·	2.8 km	MPC · JPL
110500	2001 TT_{65}	—	October 13, 2001	Socorro	LINEAR	(5)	2.9 km	MPC · JPL

== 110501–110600 ==
back to top

Designation			Discovery			Properties		Ref
Permanent	Provisional	Named after	Date	Site	Discoverer(s)	Category	Diam.	Ref
110501	2001 TW_{68}	—	October 13, 2001	Socorro	LINEAR	·	2.6 km	MPC · JPL
110502	2001 TN_{70}	—	October 13, 2001	Socorro	LINEAR	·	2.9 km	MPC · JPL
110503	2001 TT_{70}	—	October 13, 2001	Socorro	LINEAR	·	2.5 km	MPC · JPL
110504	2001 TJ_{71}	—	October 13, 2001	Socorro	LINEAR	·	2.6 km	MPC · JPL
110505	2001 TP_{71}	—	October 13, 2001	Socorro	LINEAR	HYG	6.2 km	MPC · JPL
110506	2001 TZ_{71}	—	October 13, 2001	Socorro	LINEAR	·	3.1 km	MPC · JPL
110507	2001 TK_{72}	—	October 13, 2001	Socorro	LINEAR	·	3.6 km	MPC · JPL
110508	2001 TR_{73}	—	October 13, 2001	Socorro	LINEAR	·	4.9 km	MPC · JPL
110509	2001 TW_{74}	—	October 13, 2001	Socorro	LINEAR	·	5.2 km	MPC · JPL
110510	2001 TE_{75}	—	October 13, 2001	Socorro	LINEAR	·	3.2 km	MPC · JPL
110511	2001 TO_{75}	—	October 13, 2001	Socorro	LINEAR	·	7.1 km	MPC · JPL
110512	2001 TU_{75}	—	October 13, 2001	Socorro	LINEAR	·	2.6 km	MPC · JPL
110513	2001 TW_{75}	—	October 13, 2001	Socorro	LINEAR	·	2.2 km	MPC · JPL
110514	2001 TD_{77}	—	October 13, 2001	Socorro	LINEAR	HOF	6.2 km	MPC · JPL
110515	2001 TN_{77}	—	October 13, 2001	Socorro	LINEAR	(5)	2.9 km	MPC · JPL
110516	2001 TX_{77}	—	October 13, 2001	Socorro	LINEAR	·	2.3 km	MPC · JPL
110517	2001 TX_{78}	—	October 13, 2001	Socorro	LINEAR	MAR · slow	2.0 km	MPC · JPL
110518	2001 TY_{78}	—	October 13, 2001	Socorro	LINEAR	LIX	8.0 km	MPC · JPL
110519	2001 TJ_{79}	—	October 13, 2001	Socorro	LINEAR	EUN	3.8 km	MPC · JPL
110520	2001 TL_{79}	—	October 13, 2001	Socorro	LINEAR	·	3.4 km	MPC · JPL
110521	2001 TN_{80}	—	October 13, 2001	Socorro	LINEAR	(5)	3.1 km	MPC · JPL
110522	2001 TS_{80}	—	October 13, 2001	Socorro	LINEAR	·	2.3 km	MPC · JPL
110523	2001 TD_{82}	—	October 14, 2001	Socorro	LINEAR	·	3.0 km	MPC · JPL
110524	2001 TL_{83}	—	October 14, 2001	Socorro	LINEAR	·	5.9 km	MPC · JPL
110525	2001 TW_{83}	—	October 14, 2001	Socorro	LINEAR	·	3.0 km	MPC · JPL
110526	2001 TZ_{83}	—	October 14, 2001	Socorro	LINEAR	·	2.4 km	MPC · JPL
110527	2001 TE_{85}	—	October 14, 2001	Socorro	LINEAR	·	2.1 km	MPC · JPL
110528	2001 TE_{86}	—	October 14, 2001	Socorro	LINEAR	·	6.7 km	MPC · JPL
110529	2001 TY_{86}	—	October 14, 2001	Socorro	LINEAR	·	2.7 km	MPC · JPL
110530	2001 TA_{87}	—	October 14, 2001	Socorro	LINEAR	·	3.4 km	MPC · JPL
110531	2001 TK_{87}	—	October 14, 2001	Socorro	LINEAR	·	4.1 km	MPC · JPL
110532	2001 TU_{87}	—	October 14, 2001	Socorro	LINEAR	·	3.3 km	MPC · JPL
110533	2001 TW_{88}	—	October 14, 2001	Socorro	LINEAR	·	4.3 km	MPC · JPL
110534	2001 TK_{89}	—	October 14, 2001	Socorro	LINEAR	HOF	5.4 km	MPC · JPL
110535	2001 TW_{90}	—	October 14, 2001	Socorro	LINEAR	·	2.8 km	MPC · JPL
110536	2001 TB_{91}	—	October 14, 2001	Socorro	LINEAR	·	3.1 km	MPC · JPL
110537	2001 TT_{93}	—	October 14, 2001	Socorro	LINEAR	·	3.3 km	MPC · JPL
110538	2001 TW_{94}	—	October 14, 2001	Socorro	LINEAR	·	5.3 km	MPC · JPL
110539	2001 TE_{95}	—	October 14, 2001	Socorro	LINEAR	·	2.4 km	MPC · JPL
110540	2001 TO_{95}	—	October 14, 2001	Socorro	LINEAR	(5)	1.9 km	MPC · JPL
110541	2001 TE_{96}	—	October 14, 2001	Socorro	LINEAR	·	2.3 km	MPC · JPL
110542	2001 TH_{96}	—	October 14, 2001	Socorro	LINEAR	·	3.2 km	MPC · JPL
110543	2001 TT_{96}	—	October 14, 2001	Socorro	LINEAR	·	5.5 km	MPC · JPL
110544	2001 TX_{96}	—	October 14, 2001	Socorro	LINEAR	·	3.2 km	MPC · JPL
110545	2001 TH_{97}	—	October 14, 2001	Socorro	LINEAR	·	2.0 km	MPC · JPL
110546	2001 TG_{98}	—	October 14, 2001	Socorro	LINEAR	AGN	2.4 km	MPC · JPL
110547	2001 TX_{100}	—	October 14, 2001	Socorro	LINEAR	EUN	2.5 km	MPC · JPL
110548	2001 TZ_{100}	—	October 14, 2001	Socorro	LINEAR	·	3.1 km	MPC · JPL
110549	2001 TC_{101}	—	October 14, 2001	Socorro	LINEAR	·	4.1 km	MPC · JPL
110550	2001 TY_{102}	—	October 15, 2001	Socorro	LINEAR	MAR	2.9 km	MPC · JPL
110551	2001 TZ_{102}	—	October 15, 2001	Socorro	LINEAR	·	4.6 km	MPC · JPL
110552	2001 TE_{103}	—	October 15, 2001	Socorro	LINEAR	ADE ·	3.8 km	MPC · JPL
110553	2001 TU_{103}	—	October 14, 2001	Desert Eagle	W. K. Y. Yeung	·	3.1 km	MPC · JPL
110554	2001 TD_{104}	—	October 15, 2001	Desert Eagle	W. K. Y. Yeung	EUN	2.3 km	MPC · JPL
110555	2001 TX_{105}	—	October 13, 2001	Socorro	LINEAR	·	4.5 km	MPC · JPL
110556	2001 TU_{106}	—	October 13, 2001	Socorro	LINEAR	(5)	2.5 km	MPC · JPL
110557	2001 TV_{106}	—	October 13, 2001	Socorro	LINEAR	(5)	2.8 km	MPC · JPL
110558	2001 TX_{106}	—	October 13, 2001	Socorro	LINEAR	·	3.9 km	MPC · JPL
110559	2001 TC_{107}	—	October 13, 2001	Socorro	LINEAR	EUN	3.6 km	MPC · JPL
110560	2001 TT_{107}	—	October 13, 2001	Socorro	LINEAR	EUN	3.6 km	MPC · JPL
110561	2001 TA_{108}	—	October 13, 2001	Socorro	LINEAR	·	5.6 km	MPC · JPL
110562	2001 TH_{108}	—	October 14, 2001	Socorro	LINEAR	DOR	6.0 km	MPC · JPL
110563	2001 TQ_{109}	—	October 14, 2001	Socorro	LINEAR	L5	14 km	MPC · JPL
110564	2001 TY_{110}	—	October 14, 2001	Socorro	LINEAR	·	3.8 km	MPC · JPL
110565	2001 TH_{112}	—	October 14, 2001	Socorro	LINEAR	·	2.4 km	MPC · JPL
110566	2001 TQ_{112}	—	October 14, 2001	Socorro	LINEAR	·	2.8 km	MPC · JPL
110567	2001 TW_{112}	—	October 14, 2001	Socorro	LINEAR	MRX ·	5.0 km	MPC · JPL
110568	2001 TZ_{113}	—	October 14, 2001	Socorro	LINEAR	·	3.4 km	MPC · JPL
110569	2001 TS_{114}	—	October 14, 2001	Socorro	LINEAR	(5)	3.3 km	MPC · JPL
110570	2001 TV_{114}	—	October 14, 2001	Socorro	LINEAR	·	3.4 km	MPC · JPL
110571	2001 TF_{115}	—	October 14, 2001	Socorro	LINEAR	·	2.3 km	MPC · JPL
110572	2001 TH_{115}	—	October 14, 2001	Socorro	LINEAR	·	4.6 km	MPC · JPL
110573	2001 TQ_{115}	—	October 14, 2001	Socorro	LINEAR	·	6.8 km	MPC · JPL
110574	2001 TJ_{116}	—	October 14, 2001	Socorro	LINEAR	EOS	3.9 km	MPC · JPL
110575	2001 TS_{116}	—	October 14, 2001	Socorro	LINEAR	MAR	3.0 km	MPC · JPL
110576	2001 TX_{116}	—	October 14, 2001	Socorro	LINEAR	·	4.6 km	MPC · JPL
110577	2001 TB_{117}	—	October 14, 2001	Socorro	LINEAR	H	1.7 km	MPC · JPL
110578	2001 TJ_{117}	—	October 14, 2001	Socorro	LINEAR	·	2.3 km	MPC · JPL
110579	2001 TC_{119}	—	October 15, 2001	Socorro	LINEAR	EUN	2.9 km	MPC · JPL
110580	2001 TQ_{119}	—	October 15, 2001	Socorro	LINEAR	·	3.6 km	MPC · JPL
110581	2001 TS_{119}	—	October 15, 2001	Socorro	LINEAR	·	4.1 km	MPC · JPL
110582	2001 TX_{119}	—	October 15, 2001	Socorro	LINEAR	·	4.4 km	MPC · JPL
110583	2001 TY_{119}	—	October 15, 2001	Socorro	LINEAR	·	4.2 km	MPC · JPL
110584	2001 TC_{120}	—	October 15, 2001	Socorro	LINEAR	EUN ·	3.9 km	MPC · JPL
110585	2001 TZ_{121}	—	October 15, 2001	Socorro	LINEAR	·	3.0 km	MPC · JPL
110586	2001 TN_{122}	—	October 15, 2001	Socorro	LINEAR	slow	2.6 km	MPC · JPL
110587	2001 TT_{122}	—	October 15, 2001	Socorro	LINEAR	(5)	3.4 km	MPC · JPL
110588	2001 TW_{123}	—	October 12, 2001	Haleakala	NEAT	·	8.2 km	MPC · JPL
110589	2001 TG_{124}	—	October 12, 2001	Haleakala	NEAT	·	4.0 km	MPC · JPL
110590	2001 TF_{125}	—	October 12, 2001	Haleakala	NEAT	ADE	5.2 km	MPC · JPL
110591	2001 TN_{125}	—	October 12, 2001	Haleakala	NEAT	RAF	2.3 km	MPC · JPL
110592	2001 TU_{125}	—	October 12, 2001	Haleakala	NEAT	·	3.1 km	MPC · JPL
110593	2001 TD_{128}	—	October 10, 2001	Palomar	NEAT	PHO	2.2 km	MPC · JPL
110594	2001 TQ_{128}	—	October 13, 2001	Palomar	NEAT	EOS	5.1 km	MPC · JPL
110595	2001 TZ_{130}	—	October 10, 2001	Palomar	NEAT	·	6.5 km	MPC · JPL
110596	2001 TV_{131}	—	October 11, 2001	Palomar	NEAT	·	4.5 km	MPC · JPL
110597	2001 TD_{132}	—	October 11, 2001	Palomar	NEAT	·	2.2 km	MPC · JPL
110598	2001 TC_{133}	—	October 12, 2001	Haleakala	NEAT	·	3.0 km	MPC · JPL
110599	2001 TX_{133}	—	October 12, 2001	Haleakala	NEAT	·	4.1 km	MPC · JPL
110600	2001 TH_{134}	—	October 12, 2001	Haleakala	NEAT	·	6.3 km	MPC · JPL

== 110601–110700 ==
back to top

Designation			Discovery			Properties		Ref
Permanent	Provisional	Named after	Date	Site	Discoverer(s)	Category	Diam.	Ref
110601	2001 TJ_{134}	—	October 12, 2001	Haleakala	NEAT	GEF	2.4 km	MPC · JPL
110602	2001 TC_{135}	—	October 13, 2001	Palomar	NEAT	·	5.5 km	MPC · JPL
110603	2001 TN_{135}	—	October 13, 2001	Palomar	NEAT	·	3.7 km	MPC · JPL
110604	2001 TO_{136}	—	October 14, 2001	Palomar	NEAT	·	2.7 km	MPC · JPL
110605	2001 TV_{136}	—	October 14, 2001	Palomar	NEAT	·	7.6 km	MPC · JPL
110606	2001 TX_{136}	—	October 14, 2001	Palomar	NEAT	ADE	6.6 km	MPC · JPL
110607	2001 TT_{137}	—	October 14, 2001	Palomar	NEAT	·	7.1 km	MPC · JPL
110608	2001 TA_{138}	—	October 14, 2001	Haleakala	NEAT	·	3.3 km	MPC · JPL
110609	2001 TB_{138}	—	October 14, 2001	Haleakala	NEAT	·	2.5 km	MPC · JPL
110610	2001 TD_{138}	—	October 10, 2001	Palomar	NEAT	·	6.9 km	MPC · JPL
110611	2001 TH_{139}	—	October 10, 2001	Palomar	NEAT	·	2.7 km	MPC · JPL
110612	2001 TA_{142}	—	October 10, 2001	Palomar	NEAT	·	2.6 km	MPC · JPL
110613	2001 TN_{143}	—	October 10, 2001	Palomar	NEAT	·	3.6 km	MPC · JPL
110614	2001 TH_{144}	—	October 10, 2001	Palomar	NEAT	·	6.6 km	MPC · JPL
110615	2001 TQ_{144}	—	October 10, 2001	Palomar	NEAT	·	3.1 km	MPC · JPL
110616	2001 TF_{145}	—	October 10, 2001	Palomar	NEAT	·	3.7 km	MPC · JPL
110617	2001 TD_{147}	—	October 10, 2001	Palomar	NEAT	AGN	1.7 km	MPC · JPL
110618	2001 TC_{149}	—	October 10, 2001	Palomar	NEAT	·	3.9 km	MPC · JPL
110619	2001 TL_{149}	—	October 10, 2001	Palomar	NEAT	PAD	3.8 km	MPC · JPL
110620	2001 TA_{151}	—	October 10, 2001	Palomar	NEAT	·	3.3 km	MPC · JPL
110621	2001 TE_{151}	—	October 10, 2001	Palomar	NEAT	·	4.7 km	MPC · JPL
110622	2001 TJ_{151}	—	October 10, 2001	Palomar	NEAT	·	2.7 km	MPC · JPL
110623	2001 TY_{153}	—	October 14, 2001	Haleakala	NEAT	PAD	3.5 km	MPC · JPL
110624	2001 TH_{154}	—	October 15, 2001	Palomar	NEAT	·	3.3 km	MPC · JPL
110625 Feryalözel	2001 TL_{155}	Feryalözel	October 13, 2001	Kitt Peak	Spacewatch	AST	3.5 km	MPC · JPL
110626	2001 TX_{158}	—	October 11, 2001	Palomar	NEAT	(5)	2.0 km	MPC · JPL
110627 Psaltis	2001 TP_{160}	Psaltis	October 15, 2001	Kitt Peak	Spacewatch	·	4.1 km	MPC · JPL
110628	2001 TU_{163}	—	October 11, 2001	Palomar	NEAT	THM	4.8 km	MPC · JPL
110629	2001 TM_{164}	—	October 11, 2001	Palomar	NEAT	·	1.5 km	MPC · JPL
110630	2001 TJ_{165}	—	October 15, 2001	Palomar	NEAT	·	3.5 km	MPC · JPL
110631	2001 TK_{165}	—	October 15, 2001	Palomar	NEAT	RAF	2.5 km	MPC · JPL
110632	2001 TP_{165}	—	October 14, 2001	Socorro	LINEAR	·	2.3 km	MPC · JPL
110633	2001 TU_{165}	—	October 14, 2001	Socorro	LINEAR	·	3.5 km	MPC · JPL
110634	2001 TY_{165}	—	October 14, 2001	Socorro	LINEAR	ADE	4.9 km	MPC · JPL
110635	2001 TM_{166}	—	October 15, 2001	Socorro	LINEAR	·	3.0 km	MPC · JPL
110636	2001 TO_{166}	—	October 15, 2001	Socorro	LINEAR	·	2.8 km	MPC · JPL
110637	2001 TX_{166}	—	October 15, 2001	Socorro	LINEAR	·	3.9 km	MPC · JPL
110638	2001 TA_{167}	—	October 15, 2001	Socorro	LINEAR	·	5.2 km	MPC · JPL
110639	2001 TP_{167}	—	October 15, 2001	Socorro	LINEAR	·	4.5 km	MPC · JPL
110640	2001 TT_{167}	—	October 15, 2001	Socorro	LINEAR	ADE	4.9 km	MPC · JPL
110641	2001 TY_{167}	—	October 15, 2001	Socorro	LINEAR	·	2.6 km	MPC · JPL
110642	2001 TD_{168}	—	October 15, 2001	Socorro	LINEAR	·	4.8 km	MPC · JPL
110643	2001 TN_{168}	—	October 15, 2001	Socorro	LINEAR	·	4.8 km	MPC · JPL
110644	2001 TS_{168}	—	October 15, 2001	Socorro	LINEAR	GEF	2.8 km	MPC · JPL
110645	2001 TU_{168}	—	October 15, 2001	Socorro	LINEAR	·	3.5 km	MPC · JPL
110646	2001 TC_{169}	—	October 15, 2001	Socorro	LINEAR	·	3.6 km	MPC · JPL
110647	2001 TD_{169}	—	October 15, 2001	Socorro	LINEAR	·	4.3 km	MPC · JPL
110648	2001 TF_{169}	—	October 15, 2001	Socorro	LINEAR	·	3.6 km	MPC · JPL
110649	2001 TK_{169}	—	October 15, 2001	Socorro	LINEAR	·	4.7 km	MPC · JPL
110650	2001 TG_{170}	—	October 15, 2001	Kitt Peak	Spacewatch	·	2.9 km	MPC · JPL
110651	2001 TO_{170}	—	October 13, 2001	Palomar	NEAT	GEF	2.7 km	MPC · JPL
110652	2001 TO_{171}	—	October 15, 2001	Palomar	NEAT	·	3.1 km	MPC · JPL
110653	2001 TZ_{171}	—	October 14, 2001	Anderson Mesa	LONEOS	JUN	1.6 km	MPC · JPL
110654	2001 TL_{172}	—	October 13, 2001	Socorro	LINEAR	·	3.2 km	MPC · JPL
110655	2001 TB_{173}	—	October 13, 2001	Socorro	LINEAR	·	4.0 km	MPC · JPL
110656	2001 TG_{173}	—	October 13, 2001	Socorro	LINEAR	·	3.8 km	MPC · JPL
110657	2001 TC_{174}	—	October 14, 2001	Socorro	LINEAR	·	2.9 km	MPC · JPL
110658	2001 TH_{176}	—	October 14, 2001	Socorro	LINEAR	(7744)	1.9 km	MPC · JPL
110659	2001 TX_{176}	—	October 14, 2001	Socorro	LINEAR	HIL · 3:2	9.9 km	MPC · JPL
110660	2001 TB_{181}	—	October 14, 2001	Socorro	LINEAR	·	2.0 km	MPC · JPL
110661	2001 TH_{182}	—	October 14, 2001	Socorro	LINEAR	·	3.3 km	MPC · JPL
110662	2001 TW_{182}	—	October 14, 2001	Socorro	LINEAR	·	3.5 km	MPC · JPL
110663	2001 TZ_{182}	—	October 14, 2001	Socorro	LINEAR	·	7.7 km	MPC · JPL
110664	2001 TK_{183}	—	October 14, 2001	Socorro	LINEAR	·	3.7 km	MPC · JPL
110665	2001 TD_{187}	—	October 14, 2001	Socorro	LINEAR	ADE	4.3 km	MPC · JPL
110666	2001 TZ_{187}	—	October 14, 2001	Socorro	LINEAR	NEM	3.6 km	MPC · JPL
110667	2001 TT_{189}	—	October 14, 2001	Socorro	LINEAR	·	2.9 km	MPC · JPL
110668	2001 TV_{190}	—	October 14, 2001	Socorro	LINEAR	·	4.0 km	MPC · JPL
110669	2001 TP_{193}	—	October 15, 2001	Socorro	LINEAR	·	2.3 km	MPC · JPL
110670	2001 TQ_{193}	—	October 15, 2001	Socorro	LINEAR	(5)	1.8 km	MPC · JPL
110671	2001 TP_{194}	—	October 15, 2001	Socorro	LINEAR	·	2.5 km	MPC · JPL
110672	2001 TB_{195}	—	October 15, 2001	Palomar	NEAT	·	5.5 km	MPC · JPL
110673	2001 TC_{195}	—	October 15, 2001	Palomar	NEAT	·	5.0 km	MPC · JPL
110674	2001 TL_{195}	—	October 15, 2001	Palomar	NEAT	·	4.1 km	MPC · JPL
110675	2001 TR_{195}	—	October 15, 2001	Palomar	NEAT	JUN	2.4 km	MPC · JPL
110676	2001 TC_{196}	—	October 12, 2001	Haleakala	NEAT	MAR	1.9 km	MPC · JPL
110677	2001 TQ_{196}	—	October 14, 2001	Haleakala	NEAT	·	3.9 km	MPC · JPL
110678	2001 TY_{196}	—	October 15, 2001	Palomar	NEAT	·	6.2 km	MPC · JPL
110679	2001 TN_{198}	—	October 11, 2001	Socorro	LINEAR	·	2.9 km	MPC · JPL
110680	2001 TB_{199}	—	October 11, 2001	Socorro	LINEAR	GEF	2.4 km	MPC · JPL
110681	2001 TY_{200}	—	October 11, 2001	Socorro	LINEAR	EUP	9.6 km	MPC · JPL
110682	2001 TQ_{201}	—	October 11, 2001	Socorro	LINEAR	·	3.9 km	MPC · JPL
110683	2001 TD_{202}	—	October 11, 2001	Socorro	LINEAR	·	3.7 km	MPC · JPL
110684	2001 TM_{202}	—	October 11, 2001	Socorro	LINEAR	·	2.3 km	MPC · JPL
110685	2001 TC_{203}	—	October 11, 2001	Socorro	LINEAR	·	6.3 km	MPC · JPL
110686	2001 TM_{204}	—	October 11, 2001	Socorro	LINEAR	MAR	1.7 km	MPC · JPL
110687	2001 TX_{204}	—	October 11, 2001	Socorro	LINEAR	·	2.8 km	MPC · JPL
110688	2001 TA_{205}	—	October 11, 2001	Socorro	LINEAR	·	4.1 km	MPC · JPL
110689	2001 TV_{205}	—	October 11, 2001	Socorro	LINEAR	·	2.8 km	MPC · JPL
110690	2001 TD_{206}	—	October 11, 2001	Socorro	LINEAR	·	2.4 km	MPC · JPL
110691	2001 TH_{206}	—	October 11, 2001	Socorro	LINEAR	·	3.2 km	MPC · JPL
110692	2001 TN_{208}	—	October 11, 2001	Palomar	NEAT	·	2.8 km	MPC · JPL
110693	2001 TJ_{209}	—	October 12, 2001	Haleakala	NEAT	·	4.0 km	MPC · JPL
110694	2001 TD_{211}	—	October 13, 2001	Palomar	NEAT	·	5.3 km	MPC · JPL
110695	2001 TN_{211}	—	October 13, 2001	Palomar	NEAT	·	3.3 km	MPC · JPL
110696	2001 TP_{212}	—	October 13, 2001	Anderson Mesa	LONEOS	·	6.0 km	MPC · JPL
110697	2001 TO_{213}	—	October 13, 2001	Palomar	NEAT	·	4.1 km	MPC · JPL
110698	2001 TA_{214}	—	October 13, 2001	Anderson Mesa	LONEOS	·	3.2 km	MPC · JPL
110699	2001 TF_{214}	—	October 13, 2001	Anderson Mesa	LONEOS	·	3.2 km	MPC · JPL
110700	2001 TZ_{215}	—	October 13, 2001	Palomar	NEAT	·	2.7 km	MPC · JPL

== 110701–110800 ==
back to top

Designation			Discovery			Properties		Ref
Permanent	Provisional	Named after	Date	Site	Discoverer(s)	Category	Diam.	Ref
110701	2001 TQ_{216}	—	October 13, 2001	Palomar	NEAT	·	2.9 km	MPC · JPL
110702 Titostagno	2001 TR_{216}	Titostagno	October 13, 2001	Campo Imperatore	CINEOS	·	5.5 km	MPC · JPL
110703	2001 TF_{217}	—	October 13, 2001	Anderson Mesa	LONEOS	·	3.5 km	MPC · JPL
110704	2001 TM_{218}	—	October 14, 2001	Anderson Mesa	LONEOS	·	1.4 km	MPC · JPL
110705	2001 TP_{218}	—	October 14, 2001	Anderson Mesa	LONEOS	·	2.7 km	MPC · JPL
110706	2001 TF_{221}	—	October 14, 2001	Socorro	LINEAR	·	4.0 km	MPC · JPL
110707	2001 TV_{221}	—	October 14, 2001	Socorro	LINEAR	·	3.6 km	MPC · JPL
110708	2001 TG_{225}	—	October 14, 2001	Anderson Mesa	LONEOS	GEF	2.8 km	MPC · JPL
110709	2001 TK_{226}	—	October 14, 2001	Palomar	NEAT	·	3.1 km	MPC · JPL
110710	2001 TL_{227}	—	October 15, 2001	Socorro	LINEAR	·	2.1 km	MPC · JPL
110711	2001 TX_{227}	—	October 15, 2001	Socorro	LINEAR	·	3.3 km	MPC · JPL
110712	2001 TF_{229}	—	October 15, 2001	Socorro	LINEAR	·	3.8 km	MPC · JPL
110713	2001 TH_{229}	—	October 15, 2001	Palomar	NEAT	EOS	3.8 km	MPC · JPL
110714	2001 TQ_{229}	—	October 15, 2001	Socorro	LINEAR	·	4.2 km	MPC · JPL
110715	2001 TV_{229}	—	October 15, 2001	Palomar	NEAT	·	8.3 km	MPC · JPL
110716	2001 TW_{230}	—	October 15, 2001	Palomar	NEAT	·	3.2 km	MPC · JPL
110717	2001 TX_{230}	—	October 15, 2001	Palomar	NEAT	·	6.4 km	MPC · JPL
110718	2001 TA_{231}	—	October 15, 2001	Palomar	NEAT	·	3.7 km	MPC · JPL
110719	2001 TB_{231}	—	October 15, 2001	Palomar	NEAT	·	7.4 km	MPC · JPL
110720	2001 TK_{231}	—	October 15, 2001	Palomar	NEAT	·	2.5 km	MPC · JPL
110721	2001 TL_{231}	—	October 15, 2001	Palomar	NEAT	·	8.4 km	MPC · JPL
110722	2001 TG_{232}	—	October 15, 2001	Palomar	NEAT	EOS	3.9 km	MPC · JPL
110723	2001 TP_{232}	—	October 15, 2001	Palomar	NEAT	·	3.1 km	MPC · JPL
110724	2001 TN_{233}	—	October 15, 2001	Palomar	NEAT	·	2.8 km	MPC · JPL
110725	2001 TF_{234}	—	October 15, 2001	Palomar	NEAT	·	2.9 km	MPC · JPL
110726	2001 TM_{234}	—	October 15, 2001	Palomar	NEAT	·	2.2 km	MPC · JPL
110727	2001 TR_{235}	—	October 15, 2001	Palomar	NEAT	LIX	8.6 km	MPC · JPL
110728	2001 TF_{236}	—	October 15, 2001	Palomar	NEAT	·	2.4 km	MPC · JPL
110729	2001 TN_{236}	—	October 15, 2001	Haleakala	NEAT	·	3.2 km	MPC · JPL
110730	2001 TP_{236}	—	October 7, 2001	Palomar	NEAT	·	2.8 km	MPC · JPL
110731	2001 TY_{237}	—	October 11, 2001	Socorro	LINEAR	·	2.5 km	MPC · JPL
110732	2001 TF_{238}	—	October 15, 2001	Palomar	NEAT	EUN	2.3 km	MPC · JPL
110733	2001 TK_{238}	—	October 15, 2001	Palomar	NEAT	·	3.9 km	MPC · JPL
110734	2001 TY_{238}	—	October 15, 2001	Palomar	NEAT	·	3.0 km	MPC · JPL
110735	2001 TJ_{239}	—	October 15, 2001	Palomar	NEAT	·	7.3 km	MPC · JPL
110736	2001 TO_{239}	—	October 15, 2001	Palomar	NEAT	·	3.6 km	MPC · JPL
110737	2001 TM_{240}	—	October 14, 2001	Socorro	LINEAR	·	3.6 km	MPC · JPL
110738	2001 TV_{241}	—	October 13, 2001	Anderson Mesa	LONEOS	·	3.7 km	MPC · JPL
110739	2001 TX_{241}	—	October 14, 2001	Anderson Mesa	LONEOS	·	3.2 km	MPC · JPL
110740	2001 UF	—	October 17, 2001	Nashville	Clingan, R.	HYG	3.4 km	MPC · JPL
110741	2001 UA_{1}	—	October 16, 2001	Desert Eagle	W. K. Y. Yeung	·	5.5 km	MPC · JPL
110742 Tetuokudo	2001 UP_{1}	Tetuokudo	October 18, 2001	Kuma Kogen	A. Nakamura	·	7.0 km	MPC · JPL
110743 Hirobumi	2001 UQ_{1}	Hirobumi	October 18, 2001	Kuma Kogen	A. Nakamura	·	3.1 km	MPC · JPL
110744	2001 UB_{3}	—	October 16, 2001	Socorro	LINEAR	·	4.9 km	MPC · JPL
110745	2001 UQ_{5}	—	October 21, 2001	Desert Eagle	W. K. Y. Yeung	·	4.2 km	MPC · JPL
110746	2001 UL_{7}	—	October 17, 2001	Socorro	LINEAR	EUN	2.7 km	MPC · JPL
110747	2001 UX_{7}	—	October 17, 2001	Socorro	LINEAR	·	2.5 km	MPC · JPL
110748	2001 UJ_{8}	—	October 17, 2001	Socorro	LINEAR	·	4.1 km	MPC · JPL
110749	2001 UN_{8}	—	October 17, 2001	Socorro	LINEAR	·	3.2 km	MPC · JPL
110750	2001 UK_{9}	—	October 17, 2001	Socorro	LINEAR	·	4.4 km	MPC · JPL
110751	2001 UH_{12}	—	October 24, 2001	Desert Eagle	W. K. Y. Yeung	GEF	2.7 km	MPC · JPL
110752	2001 UT_{12}	—	October 24, 2001	Desert Eagle	W. K. Y. Yeung	·	3.2 km	MPC · JPL
110753	2001 UW_{12}	—	October 24, 2001	Desert Eagle	W. K. Y. Yeung	·	2.8 km	MPC · JPL
110754	2001 UB_{13}	—	October 24, 2001	Desert Eagle	W. K. Y. Yeung	·	1.5 km	MPC · JPL
110755	2001 UT_{13}	—	October 24, 2001	Desert Eagle	W. K. Y. Yeung	·	4.0 km	MPC · JPL
110756	2001 UN_{15}	—	October 25, 2001	Desert Eagle	W. K. Y. Yeung	·	4.1 km	MPC · JPL
110757	2001 UA_{16}	—	October 25, 2001	Desert Eagle	W. K. Y. Yeung	·	1.2 km	MPC · JPL
110758	2001 UF_{17}	—	October 23, 2001	Desert Eagle	W. K. Y. Yeung	H	1.6 km	MPC · JPL
110759	2001 UR_{18}	—	October 16, 2001	Palomar	NEAT	·	4.4 km	MPC · JPL
110760	2001 UH_{19}	—	October 16, 2001	Palomar	NEAT	EOS	5.8 km	MPC · JPL
110761	2001 UM_{19}	—	October 16, 2001	Palomar	NEAT	·	3.0 km	MPC · JPL
110762	2001 UP_{19}	—	October 16, 2001	Palomar	NEAT	·	2.4 km	MPC · JPL
110763	2001 UL_{22}	—	October 17, 2001	Socorro	LINEAR	·	3.1 km	MPC · JPL
110764	2001 UV_{22}	—	October 18, 2001	Socorro	LINEAR	EUN	3.0 km	MPC · JPL
110765	2001 UK_{23}	—	October 18, 2001	Socorro	LINEAR	·	2.9 km	MPC · JPL
110766	2001 UM_{23}	—	October 18, 2001	Socorro	LINEAR	·	6.7 km	MPC · JPL
110767	2001 UB_{25}	—	October 18, 2001	Socorro	LINEAR	EUN	2.7 km	MPC · JPL
110768	2001 UH_{26}	—	October 18, 2001	Socorro	LINEAR	·	4.0 km	MPC · JPL
110769	2001 UJ_{26}	—	October 18, 2001	Socorro	LINEAR	·	3.1 km	MPC · JPL
110770	2001 UC_{27}	—	October 16, 2001	Haleakala	NEAT	·	3.3 km	MPC · JPL
110771	2001 UQ_{27}	—	October 23, 2001	Socorro	LINEAR	BRU	8.9 km	MPC · JPL
110772	2001 UY_{27}	—	October 16, 2001	Socorro	LINEAR	·	2.1 km	MPC · JPL
110773	2001 UT_{28}	—	October 16, 2001	Socorro	LINEAR	·	3.0 km	MPC · JPL
110774	2001 UT_{29}	—	October 16, 2001	Socorro	LINEAR	·	3.2 km	MPC · JPL
110775	2001 UU_{29}	—	October 16, 2001	Socorro	LINEAR	·	2.3 km	MPC · JPL
110776	2001 UY_{29}	—	October 16, 2001	Socorro	LINEAR	·	4.4 km	MPC · JPL
110777	2001 UZ_{29}	—	October 16, 2001	Socorro	LINEAR	·	7.7 km	MPC · JPL
110778	2001 UE_{30}	—	October 16, 2001	Socorro	LINEAR	·	6.6 km	MPC · JPL
110779	2001 UG_{30}	—	October 16, 2001	Socorro	LINEAR	·	3.1 km	MPC · JPL
110780	2001 UZ_{30}	—	October 16, 2001	Socorro	LINEAR	·	5.0 km	MPC · JPL
110781	2001 UW_{31}	—	October 16, 2001	Socorro	LINEAR	·	4.6 km	MPC · JPL
110782	2001 UC_{32}	—	October 16, 2001	Socorro	LINEAR	·	4.1 km	MPC · JPL
110783	2001 UO_{32}	—	October 16, 2001	Socorro	LINEAR	·	5.2 km	MPC · JPL
110784	2001 UL_{33}	—	October 16, 2001	Socorro	LINEAR	·	4.4 km	MPC · JPL
110785	2001 UU_{33}	—	October 16, 2001	Socorro	LINEAR	·	2.7 km	MPC · JPL
110786	2001 UB_{34}	—	October 16, 2001	Socorro	LINEAR	·	2.6 km	MPC · JPL
110787	2001 UP_{34}	—	October 16, 2001	Socorro	LINEAR	·	6.0 km	MPC · JPL
110788	2001 UW_{34}	—	October 16, 2001	Socorro	LINEAR	·	5.2 km	MPC · JPL
110789	2001 UO_{35}	—	October 16, 2001	Socorro	LINEAR	ADE	5.6 km	MPC · JPL
110790	2001 UV_{35}	—	October 16, 2001	Socorro	LINEAR	·	3.2 km	MPC · JPL
110791	2001 UY_{35}	—	October 16, 2001	Socorro	LINEAR	ADE	5.7 km	MPC · JPL
110792	2001 UJ_{36}	—	October 16, 2001	Socorro	LINEAR	DOR	5.4 km	MPC · JPL
110793	2001 UZ_{36}	—	October 16, 2001	Socorro	LINEAR	·	2.9 km	MPC · JPL
110794	2001 UF_{37}	—	October 16, 2001	Socorro	LINEAR	·	4.3 km	MPC · JPL
110795	2001 UN_{37}	—	October 17, 2001	Socorro	LINEAR	EUN	2.0 km	MPC · JPL
110796	2001 UW_{37}	—	October 17, 2001	Socorro	LINEAR	WIT	2.4 km	MPC · JPL
110797	2001 UV_{38}	—	October 17, 2001	Socorro	LINEAR	HYG	6.0 km	MPC · JPL
110798	2001 UZ_{38}	—	October 17, 2001	Socorro	LINEAR	·	4.0 km	MPC · JPL
110799	2001 UF_{40}	—	October 17, 2001	Socorro	LINEAR	HOF	4.3 km	MPC · JPL
110800	2001 UZ_{40}	—	October 17, 2001	Socorro	LINEAR	·	2.6 km	MPC · JPL

== 110801–110900 ==
back to top

Designation			Discovery			Properties		Ref
Permanent	Provisional	Named after	Date	Site	Discoverer(s)	Category	Diam.	Ref
110801	2001 UK_{41}	—	October 17, 2001	Socorro	LINEAR	·	2.7 km	MPC · JPL
110802	2001 UQ_{41}	—	October 17, 2001	Socorro	LINEAR	·	6.2 km	MPC · JPL
110803	2001 UR_{41}	—	October 17, 2001	Socorro	LINEAR	·	3.1 km	MPC · JPL
110804	2001 US_{41}	—	October 17, 2001	Socorro	LINEAR	·	4.6 km	MPC · JPL
110805	2001 UC_{42}	—	October 17, 2001	Socorro	LINEAR	·	4.8 km	MPC · JPL
110806	2001 UY_{43}	—	October 17, 2001	Socorro	LINEAR	·	3.7 km	MPC · JPL
110807	2001 UC_{45}	—	October 17, 2001	Socorro	LINEAR	·	2.8 km	MPC · JPL
110808	2001 UE_{46}	—	October 17, 2001	Socorro	LINEAR	PAD	3.0 km	MPC · JPL
110809	2001 UL_{46}	—	October 17, 2001	Socorro	LINEAR	(12739)	3.5 km	MPC · JPL
110810	2001 UC_{47}	—	October 17, 2001	Socorro	LINEAR	KOR	2.4 km	MPC · JPL
110811	2001 UD_{47}	—	October 17, 2001	Socorro	LINEAR	·	5.8 km	MPC · JPL
110812	2001 UR_{47}	—	October 17, 2001	Socorro	LINEAR	·	2.4 km	MPC · JPL
110813	2001 UV_{47}	—	October 17, 2001	Socorro	LINEAR	PAD	3.8 km	MPC · JPL
110814	2001 UA_{48}	—	October 17, 2001	Socorro	LINEAR	·	4.0 km	MPC · JPL
110815	2001 UC_{48}	—	October 17, 2001	Socorro	LINEAR	·	3.1 km	MPC · JPL
110816	2001 UM_{48}	—	October 17, 2001	Socorro	LINEAR	·	3.7 km	MPC · JPL
110817	2001 UP_{48}	—	October 17, 2001	Socorro	LINEAR	·	3.8 km	MPC · JPL
110818	2001 UR_{48}	—	October 17, 2001	Socorro	LINEAR	EMA	7.3 km	MPC · JPL
110819	2001 UW_{49}	—	October 17, 2001	Socorro	LINEAR	LIX	8.0 km	MPC · JPL
110820	2001 UC_{50}	—	October 17, 2001	Socorro	LINEAR	·	4.5 km	MPC · JPL
110821	2001 UA_{51}	—	October 17, 2001	Socorro	LINEAR	·	3.5 km	MPC · JPL
110822	2001 UN_{51}	—	October 17, 2001	Socorro	LINEAR	·	7.5 km	MPC · JPL
110823	2001 UO_{51}	—	October 17, 2001	Socorro	LINEAR	·	3.2 km	MPC · JPL
110824	2001 UO_{52}	—	October 17, 2001	Socorro	LINEAR	·	3.4 km	MPC · JPL
110825	2001 UX_{53}	—	October 17, 2001	Socorro	LINEAR	·	3.7 km	MPC · JPL
110826	2001 UN_{54}	—	October 18, 2001	Socorro	LINEAR	·	2.0 km	MPC · JPL
110827	2001 UO_{54}	—	October 18, 2001	Socorro	LINEAR	·	4.2 km	MPC · JPL
110828	2001 US_{54}	—	October 18, 2001	Socorro	LINEAR	·	3.6 km	MPC · JPL
110829	2001 UT_{54}	—	October 20, 2001	Socorro	LINEAR	L5	11 km	MPC · JPL
110830	2001 UZ_{55}	—	October 17, 2001	Socorro	LINEAR	·	3.3 km	MPC · JPL
110831	2001 UO_{57}	—	October 17, 2001	Socorro	LINEAR	·	4.1 km	MPC · JPL
110832	2001 UA_{58}	—	October 17, 2001	Socorro	LINEAR	L5	14 km	MPC · JPL
110833	2001 UB_{59}	—	October 17, 2001	Socorro	LINEAR	·	2.8 km	MPC · JPL
110834	2001 UF_{60}	—	October 17, 2001	Socorro	LINEAR	·	2.7 km	MPC · JPL
110835	2001 UA_{65}	—	October 18, 2001	Socorro	LINEAR	·	4.4 km	MPC · JPL
110836	2001 UH_{65}	—	October 18, 2001	Socorro	LINEAR	·	4.6 km	MPC · JPL
110837	2001 UW_{65}	—	October 18, 2001	Socorro	LINEAR	(5)	4.0 km	MPC · JPL
110838	2001 UK_{68}	—	October 20, 2001	Socorro	LINEAR	·	2.4 km	MPC · JPL
110839	2001 UR_{68}	—	October 20, 2001	Socorro	LINEAR	·	3.4 km	MPC · JPL
110840	2001 UZ_{71}	—	October 17, 2001	Haleakala	NEAT	·	5.6 km	MPC · JPL
110841	2001 UG_{72}	—	October 20, 2001	Haleakala	NEAT	·	3.5 km	MPC · JPL
110842	2001 UD_{73}	—	October 17, 2001	Socorro	LINEAR	·	4.6 km	MPC · JPL
110843	2001 UK_{73}	—	October 17, 2001	Socorro	LINEAR	AGN	2.1 km	MPC · JPL
110844	2001 UC_{74}	—	October 17, 2001	Socorro	LINEAR	·	6.7 km	MPC · JPL
110845	2001 UE_{74}	—	October 17, 2001	Socorro	LINEAR	HYG	6.4 km	MPC · JPL
110846	2001 UJ_{74}	—	October 17, 2001	Socorro	LINEAR	·	3.5 km	MPC · JPL
110847	2001 UO_{74}	—	October 17, 2001	Socorro	LINEAR	·	2.5 km	MPC · JPL
110848	2001 UV_{74}	—	October 17, 2001	Socorro	LINEAR	·	3.0 km	MPC · JPL
110849	2001 UN_{75}	—	October 17, 2001	Socorro	LINEAR	·	4.5 km	MPC · JPL
110850	2001 UY_{75}	—	October 17, 2001	Socorro	LINEAR	·	3.6 km	MPC · JPL
110851	2001 UF_{76}	—	October 17, 2001	Socorro	LINEAR	·	2.2 km	MPC · JPL
110852	2001 US_{76}	—	October 17, 2001	Socorro	LINEAR	·	3.8 km	MPC · JPL
110853	2001 UT_{76}	—	October 17, 2001	Socorro	LINEAR	T_{j} (2.98) · 3:2	10 km	MPC · JPL
110854	2001 UL_{77}	—	October 17, 2001	Socorro	LINEAR	WIT	2.2 km	MPC · JPL
110855	2001 UO_{77}	—	October 17, 2001	Socorro	LINEAR	KOR	2.5 km	MPC · JPL
110856	2001 UT_{77}	—	October 17, 2001	Socorro	LINEAR	·	3.0 km	MPC · JPL
110857	2001 UQ_{79}	—	October 20, 2001	Socorro	LINEAR	·	3.9 km	MPC · JPL
110858	2001 UR_{79}	—	October 20, 2001	Socorro	LINEAR	·	1.9 km	MPC · JPL
110859	2001 UW_{79}	—	October 20, 2001	Socorro	LINEAR	L5	13 km	MPC · JPL
110860	2001 UE_{82}	—	October 20, 2001	Socorro	LINEAR	·	3.2 km	MPC · JPL
110861	2001 UH_{82}	—	October 20, 2001	Socorro	LINEAR	·	4.0 km	MPC · JPL
110862	2001 UM_{83}	—	October 20, 2001	Socorro	LINEAR	·	3.5 km	MPC · JPL
110863	2001 UN_{85}	—	October 16, 2001	Kitt Peak	Spacewatch	·	2.0 km	MPC · JPL
110864	2001 UG_{89}	—	October 22, 2001	Palomar	NEAT	EUN	3.6 km	MPC · JPL
110865	2001 UL_{89}	—	October 22, 2001	Palomar	NEAT	·	3.5 km	MPC · JPL
110866	2001 UH_{91}	—	October 23, 2001	Kitt Peak	Spacewatch	·	2.3 km	MPC · JPL
110867	2001 UE_{93}	—	October 19, 2001	Haleakala	NEAT	·	3.2 km	MPC · JPL
110868	2001 UP_{93}	—	October 19, 2001	Haleakala	NEAT	·	6.3 km	MPC · JPL
110869	2001 UA_{94}	—	October 19, 2001	Haleakala	NEAT	EUN	1.6 km	MPC · JPL
110870	2001 UE_{94}	—	October 19, 2001	Haleakala	NEAT	·	4.0 km	MPC · JPL
110871	2001 UH_{94}	—	October 19, 2001	Haleakala	NEAT	TIR	5.7 km	MPC · JPL
110872	2001 UJ_{94}	—	October 19, 2001	Haleakala	NEAT	·	4.2 km	MPC · JPL
110873	2001 US_{94}	—	October 19, 2001	Haleakala	NEAT	ADE	4.4 km	MPC · JPL
110874	2001 UQ_{96}	—	October 17, 2001	Socorro	LINEAR	·	3.5 km	MPC · JPL
110875	2001 UM_{97}	—	October 17, 2001	Socorro	LINEAR	·	2.4 km	MPC · JPL
110876	2001 UX_{98}	—	October 17, 2001	Socorro	LINEAR	·	4.2 km	MPC · JPL
110877	2001 UY_{98}	—	October 17, 2001	Socorro	LINEAR	·	2.4 km	MPC · JPL
110878	2001 UA_{99}	—	October 17, 2001	Socorro	LINEAR	·	3.6 km	MPC · JPL
110879	2001 UL_{99}	—	October 17, 2001	Socorro	LINEAR	·	1.8 km	MPC · JPL
110880	2001 UP_{101}	—	October 20, 2001	Socorro	LINEAR	·	2.0 km	MPC · JPL
110881	2001 US_{102}	—	October 20, 2001	Socorro	LINEAR	(7744)	2.6 km	MPC · JPL
110882	2001 UF_{104}	—	October 20, 2001	Socorro	LINEAR	KOR	2.2 km	MPC · JPL
110883	2001 UY_{107}	—	October 20, 2001	Socorro	LINEAR	·	3.5 km	MPC · JPL
110884	2001 UE_{109}	—	October 20, 2001	Socorro	LINEAR	·	5.2 km	MPC · JPL
110885	2001 UM_{109}	—	October 20, 2001	Socorro	LINEAR	·	3.7 km	MPC · JPL
110886	2001 UG_{111}	—	October 21, 2001	Socorro	LINEAR	·	2.3 km	MPC · JPL
110887	2001 UM_{111}	—	October 21, 2001	Socorro	LINEAR	AGN	2.1 km	MPC · JPL
110888	2001 UX_{111}	—	October 21, 2001	Socorro	LINEAR	·	3.8 km	MPC · JPL
110889	2001 UA_{112}	—	October 21, 2001	Socorro	LINEAR	·	1.3 km	MPC · JPL
110890	2001 UO_{112}	—	October 21, 2001	Socorro	LINEAR	·	3.2 km	MPC · JPL
110891	2001 UD_{113}	—	October 21, 2001	Socorro	LINEAR	·	3.5 km	MPC · JPL
110892	2001 UP_{113}	—	October 22, 2001	Socorro	LINEAR	·	2.9 km	MPC · JPL
110893	2001 UY_{113}	—	October 22, 2001	Socorro	LINEAR	KOR	2.6 km	MPC · JPL
110894	2001 UP_{114}	—	October 22, 2001	Socorro	LINEAR	·	3.6 km	MPC · JPL
110895	2001 US_{115}	—	October 22, 2001	Socorro	LINEAR	·	2.6 km	MPC · JPL
110896	2001 UT_{115}	—	October 22, 2001	Socorro	LINEAR	·	3.7 km	MPC · JPL
110897	2001 UG_{116}	—	October 22, 2001	Socorro	LINEAR	·	2.8 km	MPC · JPL
110898	2001 UK_{116}	—	October 22, 2001	Socorro	LINEAR	·	3.5 km	MPC · JPL
110899	2001 UE_{117}	—	October 22, 2001	Socorro	LINEAR	·	2.9 km	MPC · JPL
110900	2001 UJ_{117}	—	October 22, 2001	Socorro	LINEAR	·	3.5 km	MPC · JPL

== 110901–111000 ==
back to top

Designation			Discovery			Properties		Ref
Permanent	Provisional	Named after	Date	Site	Discoverer(s)	Category	Diam.	Ref
110901	2001 UB_{120}	—	October 22, 2001	Socorro	LINEAR	KOR	2.6 km	MPC · JPL
110902	2001 UN_{120}	—	October 22, 2001	Socorro	LINEAR	·	2.5 km	MPC · JPL
110903	2001 UE_{121}	—	October 22, 2001	Socorro	LINEAR	·	2.4 km	MPC · JPL
110904	2001 US_{121}	—	October 22, 2001	Socorro	LINEAR	·	4.6 km	MPC · JPL
110905	2001 UZ_{121}	—	October 22, 2001	Socorro	LINEAR	·	7.3 km	MPC · JPL
110906	2001 UO_{122}	—	October 22, 2001	Socorro	LINEAR	·	3.7 km	MPC · JPL
110907	2001 UX_{122}	—	October 22, 2001	Socorro	LINEAR	·	3.9 km	MPC · JPL
110908	2001 UR_{123}	—	October 22, 2001	Palomar	NEAT	·	2.6 km	MPC · JPL
110909	2001 UZ_{123}	—	October 22, 2001	Palomar	NEAT	ADE	4.4 km	MPC · JPL
110910	2001 UC_{125}	—	October 22, 2001	Palomar	NEAT	slow	3.3 km	MPC · JPL
110911	2001 UM_{125}	—	October 22, 2001	Palomar	NEAT	·	3.1 km	MPC · JPL
110912	2001 UB_{126}	—	October 23, 2001	Palomar	NEAT	EUN · slow	3.5 km	MPC · JPL
110913	2001 UF_{126}	—	October 23, 2001	Palomar	NEAT	·	4.0 km	MPC · JPL
110914	2001 UV_{127}	—	October 17, 2001	Socorro	LINEAR	EUN	3.5 km	MPC · JPL
110915	2001 UE_{131}	—	October 20, 2001	Socorro	LINEAR	PAD	4.0 km	MPC · JPL
110916	2001 UX_{133}	—	October 21, 2001	Socorro	LINEAR	EUN	2.5 km	MPC · JPL
110917	2001 UH_{135}	—	October 22, 2001	Socorro	LINEAR	LEO	4.0 km	MPC · JPL
110918	2001 UP_{135}	—	October 22, 2001	Socorro	LINEAR	·	6.3 km	MPC · JPL
110919	2001 UF_{140}	—	October 23, 2001	Socorro	LINEAR	·	3.0 km	MPC · JPL
110920	2001 UC_{141}	—	October 23, 2001	Socorro	LINEAR	·	3.1 km	MPC · JPL
110921	2001 UX_{141}	—	October 23, 2001	Socorro	LINEAR	HIL · 3:2 · (3561)	8.5 km	MPC · JPL
110922	2001 UZ_{142}	—	October 23, 2001	Socorro	LINEAR	·	3.1 km	MPC · JPL
110923	2001 UQ_{144}	—	October 23, 2001	Socorro	LINEAR	ADE	3.4 km	MPC · JPL
110924	2001 UV_{144}	—	October 23, 2001	Socorro	LINEAR	·	3.9 km	MPC · JPL
110925	2001 UN_{145}	—	October 23, 2001	Socorro	LINEAR	·	3.0 km	MPC · JPL
110926	2001 UY_{145}	—	October 23, 2001	Socorro	LINEAR	·	2.5 km	MPC · JPL
110927	2001 UB_{146}	—	October 23, 2001	Socorro	LINEAR	·	2.7 km	MPC · JPL
110928	2001 UE_{146}	—	October 23, 2001	Socorro	LINEAR	·	3.1 km	MPC · JPL
110929	2001 UC_{147}	—	October 23, 2001	Socorro	LINEAR	NYS ·	2.3 km	MPC · JPL
110930	2001 UQ_{147}	—	October 23, 2001	Socorro	LINEAR	·	2.7 km	MPC · JPL
110931	2001 UT_{149}	—	October 23, 2001	Socorro	LINEAR	NEM	4.2 km	MPC · JPL
110932	2001 UC_{151}	—	October 23, 2001	Socorro	LINEAR	·	3.6 km	MPC · JPL
110933	2001 UC_{152}	—	October 23, 2001	Socorro	LINEAR	·	3.1 km	MPC · JPL
110934	2001 UR_{152}	—	October 23, 2001	Socorro	LINEAR	·	3.5 km	MPC · JPL
110935	2001 UU_{152}	—	October 23, 2001	Socorro	LINEAR	·	3.7 km	MPC · JPL
110936	2001 UX_{152}	—	October 23, 2001	Socorro	LINEAR	·	3.5 km	MPC · JPL
110937	2001 UF_{153}	—	October 23, 2001	Socorro	LINEAR	·	3.7 km	MPC · JPL
110938	2001 UK_{153}	—	October 23, 2001	Socorro	LINEAR	·	2.2 km	MPC · JPL
110939	2001 UT_{153}	—	October 23, 2001	Socorro	LINEAR	·	4.8 km	MPC · JPL
110940	2001 UV_{153}	—	October 23, 2001	Socorro	LINEAR	·	5.3 km	MPC · JPL
110941	2001 UE_{154}	—	October 23, 2001	Socorro	LINEAR	·	2.7 km	MPC · JPL
110942	2001 UU_{154}	—	October 23, 2001	Socorro	LINEAR	AGN	2.1 km	MPC · JPL
110943	2001 UC_{155}	—	October 23, 2001	Socorro	LINEAR	·	4.1 km	MPC · JPL
110944	2001 UJ_{155}	—	October 23, 2001	Socorro	LINEAR	·	4.3 km	MPC · JPL
110945	2001 UQ_{155}	—	October 23, 2001	Socorro	LINEAR	GEF	2.2 km	MPC · JPL
110946	2001 UR_{155}	—	October 23, 2001	Socorro	LINEAR	·	3.1 km	MPC · JPL
110947	2001 UW_{155}	—	October 23, 2001	Socorro	LINEAR	·	3.6 km	MPC · JPL
110948	2001 UY_{155}	—	October 23, 2001	Socorro	LINEAR	·	2.7 km	MPC · JPL
110949	2001 UJ_{156}	—	October 23, 2001	Socorro	LINEAR	THM	4.7 km	MPC · JPL
110950	2001 US_{158}	—	October 23, 2001	Socorro	LINEAR	KOR	2.2 km	MPC · JPL
110951	2001 UE_{160}	—	October 23, 2001	Socorro	LINEAR	·	3.0 km	MPC · JPL
110952	2001 UV_{160}	—	October 23, 2001	Socorro	LINEAR	KOR	3.0 km	MPC · JPL
110953	2001 UA_{162}	—	October 23, 2001	Socorro	LINEAR	·	4.3 km	MPC · JPL
110954	2001 UT_{163}	—	October 17, 2001	Palomar	NEAT	·	7.7 km	MPC · JPL
110955	2001 UV_{164}	—	October 23, 2001	Palomar	NEAT	·	2.5 km	MPC · JPL
110956	2001 UW_{164}	—	October 23, 2001	Palomar	NEAT	·	2.7 km	MPC · JPL
110957	2001 UG_{165}	—	October 23, 2001	Palomar	NEAT	·	1.8 km	MPC · JPL
110958	2001 UH_{167}	—	October 19, 2001	Socorro	LINEAR	·	3.7 km	MPC · JPL
110959	2001 UT_{167}	—	October 19, 2001	Socorro	LINEAR	·	4.2 km	MPC · JPL
110960	2001 UC_{168}	—	October 19, 2001	Socorro	LINEAR	·	7.4 km	MPC · JPL
110961	2001 UW_{168}	—	October 19, 2001	Socorro	LINEAR	TIR	7.9 km	MPC · JPL
110962	2001 UH_{169}	—	October 19, 2001	Socorro	LINEAR	·	3.0 km	MPC · JPL
110963	2001 UK_{170}	—	October 21, 2001	Socorro	LINEAR	·	3.6 km	MPC · JPL
110964	2001 UW_{170}	—	October 21, 2001	Socorro	LINEAR	KOR	2.2 km	MPC · JPL
110965	2001 UX_{170}	—	October 21, 2001	Socorro	LINEAR	AGN	2.6 km	MPC · JPL
110966	2001 UO_{171}	—	October 23, 2001	Socorro	LINEAR	CYB	6.9 km	MPC · JPL
110967	2001 UZ_{171}	—	October 18, 2001	Palomar	NEAT	·	2.5 km	MPC · JPL
110968	2001 UZ_{172}	—	October 18, 2001	Palomar	NEAT	·	5.3 km	MPC · JPL
110969	2001 UE_{177}	—	October 21, 2001	Socorro	LINEAR	·	2.2 km	MPC · JPL
110970	2001 UK_{177}	—	October 21, 2001	Socorro	LINEAR	·	2.2 km	MPC · JPL
110971	2001 UM_{177}	—	October 21, 2001	Socorro	LINEAR	·	4.1 km	MPC · JPL
110972	2001 UF_{178}	—	October 23, 2001	Palomar	NEAT	·	7.1 km	MPC · JPL
110973	2001 UJ_{178}	—	October 23, 2001	Palomar	NEAT	·	6.4 km	MPC · JPL
110974	2001 UP_{179}	—	October 26, 2001	Haleakala	NEAT	·	4.8 km	MPC · JPL
110975	2001 UU_{179}	—	October 26, 2001	Haleakala	NEAT	·	3.5 km	MPC · JPL
110976	2001 UJ_{182}	—	October 16, 2001	Palomar	NEAT	·	5.6 km	MPC · JPL
110977	2001 UK_{183}	—	October 16, 2001	Palomar	NEAT	(5)	2.4 km	MPC · JPL
110978	2001 UB_{184}	—	October 16, 2001	Socorro	LINEAR	·	4.2 km	MPC · JPL
110979	2001 UL_{187}	—	October 17, 2001	Palomar	NEAT	·	2.1 km	MPC · JPL
110980	2001 UW_{187}	—	October 17, 2001	Socorro	LINEAR	·	4.7 km	MPC · JPL
110981	2001 UN_{188}	—	October 17, 2001	Socorro	LINEAR	·	3.2 km	MPC · JPL
110982	2001 UA_{189}	—	October 18, 2001	Socorro	LINEAR	·	7.7 km	MPC · JPL
110983	2001 UF_{189}	—	October 18, 2001	Socorro	LINEAR	·	7.9 km	MPC · JPL
110984	2001 UV_{189}	—	October 18, 2001	Palomar	NEAT	·	2.6 km	MPC · JPL
110985	2001 UV_{191}	—	October 18, 2001	Socorro	LINEAR	·	3.3 km	MPC · JPL
110986	2001 UE_{192}	—	October 18, 2001	Socorro	LINEAR	·	4.4 km	MPC · JPL
110987	2001 UT_{192}	—	October 18, 2001	Socorro	LINEAR	·	3.6 km	MPC · JPL
110988	2001 UJ_{193}	—	October 18, 2001	Socorro	LINEAR	EUN	1.7 km	MPC · JPL
110989	2001 US_{197}	—	October 19, 2001	Socorro	LINEAR	·	6.7 km	MPC · JPL
110990	2001 UH_{202}	—	October 19, 2001	Palomar	NEAT	·	2.9 km	MPC · JPL
110991	2001 UG_{204}	—	October 19, 2001	Palomar	NEAT	·	4.3 km	MPC · JPL
110992	2001 UJ_{204}	—	October 19, 2001	Palomar	NEAT	·	2.3 km	MPC · JPL
110993	2001 UO_{205}	—	October 19, 2001	Palomar	NEAT	·	3.2 km	MPC · JPL
110994	2001 UC_{213}	—	October 22, 2001	Palomar	NEAT	·	4.5 km	MPC · JPL
110995	2001 UD_{213}	—	October 22, 2001	Palomar	NEAT	·	3.1 km	MPC · JPL
110996	2001 UE_{213}	—	October 23, 2001	Anderson Mesa	LONEOS	·	2.8 km	MPC · JPL
110997	2001 UT_{216}	—	October 24, 2001	Kitt Peak	Spacewatch	·	2.5 km	MPC · JPL
110998	2001 UF_{219}	—	October 20, 2001	Haleakala	NEAT	·	4.1 km	MPC · JPL
110999	2001 UO_{219}	—	October 16, 2001	Socorro	LINEAR	·	4.5 km	MPC · JPL
111000	2001 UT_{219}	—	October 17, 2001	Socorro	LINEAR	·	5.4 km	MPC · JPL

back to top

== See also ==
- Meanings of minor-planet names: 110001–111000
