= 110393 Rammstein =

Main-belt asteroid

Discovery
- Discovered by: J.-C. Merlin
- Discovery site: Le Creusot Obs.
- Discovery date: 11 October 2001

Designations
- Named after: Rammstein (industrial metal band)
- Alternative designations: 2001 TC_{8}
- Minor planet category: main-belt · (middle) background

Orbital characteristics
- Epoch 4 September 2017 (JD 2458000.5)
- Uncertainty parameter 0
- Observation arc: 15.62 yr (5,704 days)
- Aphelion: 2.9427 AU
- Perihelion: 2.4774 AU
- Semi-major axis: 2.7101 AU
- Eccentricity: 0.0859
- Orbital period (sidereal): 4.46 yr (1,630 days)
- Mean anomaly: 167.18°
- Mean motion: 0° 13^{m} 15.24^{s} / day
- Inclination: 12.164°
- Longitude of ascending node: 217.13°
- Argument of perihelion: 222.53°

Physical characteristics
- Mean diameter: 3.0 km (est. at 0.20); 5.5 km (est. at 0.06)
- Absolute magnitude (H): 15.0

110393 Rammstein (provisional designation 2001 TC_{8}) is a background asteroid from the central region of the asteroid belt, approximately 4 kilometers in diameter. It was discovered on 11 October 2001, by French astronomer Jean-Claude Merlin at the Le Creusot Observatory in France. The asteroid was named after the German industrial metal band Rammstein.

== Orbit and classification ==
Rammstein is a non-family asteroid from the main belt's background population. It orbits the Sun in the central asteroid belt at a distance of 2.5–2.9 AU once every 4 years and 6 months (1,630 days; semi-major axis of 2.71 AU). Its orbit has an eccentricity of 0.09 and an inclination of 12° with respect to the ecliptic.

The body's observation arc begins with its first observation made by LONEOS at Lowell Observatory in September 2001, less than a month prior to its official discovery observation at Le Creusot. A telescope is required to see Rammstein, as its maximum brightness is 1/48193 of the brightness of the faintest objects that can be seen with the unaided eye.

== Physical characteristics ==
The asteroid's spectral type is unknown.

=== Diameter and albedo ===
Rammstein has not been observed by any of the space-based surveys such as the Infrared Astronomical Satellite IRAS, the Japanese Akari satellite or the NEOWISE mission of NASA's Wide-field Infrared Survey Explorer. Based on a generic magnitude-to-diameter conversion, the asteroid measures 3.0 and 5.5 kilometers in diameter based on an absolute magnitude of 15.0 and a geometric albedo of 0.20 and 0.06, which roughly correspond to a body of carbonaceous and stony composition, respectively (both types are common in the central asteroid belt). The Minor Planet Center (MPC) similarly estimates the object's mean diameter to be between 3 and 6 kilometers.

=== Rotation period ===
As of 2018, no rotational lightcurve of Rammstein has been obtained from photometric observations. The body's rotation period, shape and poles remain unknown.

== Naming ==
This minor planet was named after the German NDH-Metal band Rammstein, which in turn took its name from the city of Ramstein after the tragic 1988 air show disaster at Ramstein Air Base. The official naming citation was published by the MPC on 19 February 2006 (M.P.C. 55989).
