= Meanings of minor-planet names: 112001–113000 =

As minor planet discoveries are confirmed, they are given a permanent number by the IAU's Minor Planet Center (MPC), and the discoverers can then submit names for them, following the IAU's naming conventions. The list below concerns those minor planets in the specified number-range that have received names, and explains the meanings of those names.

Official naming citations of newly named small Solar System bodies are approved and published in a bulletin by IAU's Working Group for Small Bodies Nomenclature (WGSBN). Before May 2021, citations were published in MPC's Minor Planet Circulars for many decades. Recent citations can also be found on the JPL Small-Body Database (SBDB). Until his death in 2016, German astronomer Lutz D. Schmadel compiled these citations into the Dictionary of Minor Planet Names (DMP) and regularly updated the collection.

Based on Paul Herget's The Names of the Minor Planets, Schmadel also researched the unclear origin of numerous asteroids, most of which had been named prior to World War II. This article incorporates text from this source, which is in the public domain: SBDB New namings may only be added to this list below after official publication as the preannouncement of names is condemned. The WGSBN publishes a comprehensive guideline for the naming rules of non-cometary small Solar System bodies.

== 112001–112100 ==
Named minor planet	Provisional	This minor planet was named for...	Ref · Catalog
There are no named minor planets in this number range

== 112101–112200 ==
back to top

Named minor planet	Provisional	This minor planet was named for...	Ref · Catalog
There are no named minor planets in this number range

== 112201–112300 ==
back to top

Named minor planet	Provisional	This minor planet was named for...	Ref · Catalog
112233 Kammerer	2002 KC_{15}	Andreas Kammerer (born 1958), German physicist and amateur astronomer, who has made photometric light-curve observations of comets	JPL · 112233

== 112301–112400 ==
back to top

Named minor planet	Provisional	This minor planet was named for...	Ref · Catalog
112313 Larrylines	2002 LL_{55}	Larry Lines (1949–2019) was a Canadian exploration geophysicist. During his distinguished career he was a researcher at Amoco's Tulsa lab, a professor and industry consortium leader at Memorial University of Newfoundland and the University of Calgary, and president of the Society of Exploration Geophysicists.	IAU · 112313
112320 Danielegardiol	2002 MB_{1}	Daniele Gardiol (born 1968) is an astronomer at the Torino Astrophysical Observatory (Italy). He is the principal investigator of the PRISMA project, a network of all-sky cameras dedicated to the observation of bright meteors in order to determine the trajectory and orbit of the progenitor bodies and to delimit the area where possible meteorites fall.	IAU · 112320
112328 Klinkerfues	2002 MU_{4}	Wilhelm Klinkerfues (1827–1884), a German astronomer and meteorologist at Göttingen Observatory	JPL · 112328
112337 Francescaguerra	2002 NR_{4}	Francesca Guerra (born 1984), an Italian mathematician and software developer for the Near-Earth Object Coordination Centre (NEOCC) of the European Space Agency.	IAU · 112337
112338 Seneseconte	2002 NX_{5}	Senese Antonella (born 1960) and Conte Paolo (born 1961) are science communicators, working mainly in schools, explaining the sky with planetariums, telescopes and laboratories. Paolo is also editor and host of Radio3Scienza, the daily radio science broadcast of RAI, the national public broadcasting company of Italy.	IAU · 112338
112339 Pimpa	2002 NF_{6}	Pimpa (b. 2008) is the dog that discovered the Cavezzo meteorite just a few days after it fell near Cavezzo, Italy on 2020 Jan. 1.	IAU · 112339
112340 Davidegaddi	2002 NN_{6}	Davide Gaddi (b. 1971), the owner of the dog Pimpa who discovered the Cavezzo meteorite on 2020 Jan. 4, about three days after the fall.	IAU · 112340

== 112401–112500 ==
back to top

Named minor planet	Provisional	This minor planet was named for...	Ref · Catalog
112483 Missjudy	2002 PA	Judy Ball (born 1946), wife of American amateur astronomer Loren C. Ball, who discovered this minor planet, for her long-time support of her husband's astronomy projects.	IAU · 112483
112492 Annacipriani	2002 PA_{6}	Anna Cipriani (born 1973), an assistant professor of geochemistry and environmental geochemistry at University of Modena and Reggio Emilia.	IAU · 112492

== 112501–112600 ==
back to top

Named minor planet	Provisional	This minor planet was named for...	Ref · Catalog
112527 Panarese	2002 PJ_{33}	Rossella Panarese (1960–2021) was an Italian radio personality and science communicator, known for her Radio3 Scienza cultural programme, as well as a lecturer at SISSA and Sapienza University of Rome.	IAU · 112527

== 112601–112700 ==
back to top

Named minor planet	Provisional	This minor planet was named for...	Ref · Catalog
112656 Gines	2002 PM_{86}	Gines Lopez (1933–2008), friend and collaborator of Spanish astronomer Rafael Ferrando, who discovered this minor planet	JPL · 112656
112660 Artlucas	2002 PX_{86}	Arthur Lucas, US nuclear physicist.	IAU · 112660

== 112701–112800 ==
back to top

Named minor planet	Provisional	This minor planet was named for...	Ref · Catalog
112797 Grantjudy	2002 PH_{165}	Grant R. J. Harding (born 1967) and Judy L. Harding (born 1965), siblings-in-law of Canadian amateur astronomer Andrew Lowe, who discovered this minor planet	JPL · 112797
112798 Kelindsey	2002 PR_{165}	Kelsey Leanne Harding (born 2000) and Lindsey Annemarie Harding (born 1998), nieces of Canadian amateur astronomer Andrew Lowe, who discovered this minor planet	JPL · 112798

== 112801–112900 ==
back to top

Named minor planet	Provisional	This minor planet was named for...	Ref · Catalog
112900 Tonyhoffman	2002 QS_{50}	Tony Hoffman (born 1958), an American poet, writer, editor, and director of the Amateur Astronomers Association of New York. He also discovered several sungrazing comets and is an uncredited co-discoverer of asteroid 2005 JB_{22}.	JPL · 112900

== 112901–113000 ==
back to top

Named minor planet	Provisional	This minor planet was named for...	Ref · Catalog
112947 Marinascatena	2002 RQ_{8}	Marina Scatena, Italian lawyer.	IAU · 112947

back to top

Preceded by 111,001–112,000	Meanings of minor-planet names List of minor planets: 112,001–113,000	Succeeded by 113,001–114,000
