= List of minor planets: 112001–113000 =

The following is a partial list of minor planets, running from minor-planet number 112001 through 113000, inclusive. The primary data for this and other partial lists is based on JPL's "Small-Body Orbital Elements" and data available from the Minor Planet Center. Critical list information is also provided by the MPC, unless otherwise specified from Lowell Observatory. A detailed description of the table's columns and additional sources are given on the main page including a complete list of every page in this series, and a statistical break-up on the dynamical classification of minor planets.

Also see the summary list of all named bodies in numerical and alphabetical order, and the corresponding naming citations for the number range of this particular list. New namings may only be added to this list after official publication, as the preannouncement of names is condemned by the Working Group for Small Bodies Nomenclature of the International Astronomical Union.

Near-Earth obj.	MBA (inner)	MBA (outer)	Centaur
Mars-crosser	MBA (middle)	Jupiter trojan	Trans-Neptunian obj.
Unclassified

== 112001–112100 ==
Designation			Discovery			Properties		Ref
Permanent	Provisional	Named after	Date	Site	Discoverer(s)	Category	Diam.	Ref
112001	2002 GW_{137}	—	April 12, 2002	Palomar	NEAT	·	6.2 km	MPC · JPL
112002	2002 GH_{138}	—	April 12, 2002	Kitt Peak	Spacewatch	·	1.5 km	MPC · JPL
112003	2002 GB_{139}	—	April 13, 2002	Palomar	NEAT	PHO	2.2 km	MPC · JPL
112004	2002 GM_{144}	—	April 11, 2002	Palomar	NEAT	·	4.8 km	MPC · JPL
112005	2002 GL_{146}	—	April 13, 2002	Palomar	NEAT	·	1.9 km	MPC · JPL
112006	2002 GH_{151}	—	April 14, 2002	Socorro	LINEAR	·	1.6 km	MPC · JPL
112007	2002 GG_{153}	—	April 12, 2002	Palomar	NEAT	·	2.7 km	MPC · JPL
112008	2002 GA_{154}	—	April 12, 2002	Palomar	NEAT	·	10 km	MPC · JPL
112009	2002 GO_{154}	—	April 13, 2002	Palomar	NEAT	·	1.4 km	MPC · JPL
112010	2002 GR_{154}	—	April 13, 2002	Palomar	NEAT	·	2.1 km	MPC · JPL
112011	2002 GW_{158}	—	April 13, 2002	Palomar	NEAT	·	1.5 km	MPC · JPL
112012	2002 GL_{159}	—	April 14, 2002	Socorro	LINEAR	·	1.9 km	MPC · JPL
112013	2002 GP_{161}	—	April 14, 2002	Palomar	NEAT	·	3.6 km	MPC · JPL
112014	2002 GE_{163}	—	April 14, 2002	Palomar	NEAT	NYS	2.3 km	MPC · JPL
112015	2002 GX_{163}	—	April 14, 2002	Palomar	NEAT	·	1.2 km	MPC · JPL
112016	2002 GC_{164}	—	April 14, 2002	Palomar	NEAT	·	1.6 km	MPC · JPL
112017	2002 GA_{165}	—	April 14, 2002	Palomar	NEAT	·	1.4 km	MPC · JPL
112018	2002 GM_{165}	—	April 14, 2002	Palomar	NEAT	V	1.8 km	MPC · JPL
112019	2002 GL_{168}	—	April 9, 2002	Socorro	LINEAR	·	1.9 km	MPC · JPL
112020	2002 GW_{168}	—	April 9, 2002	Socorro	LINEAR	·	1.5 km	MPC · JPL
112021	2002 GY_{175}	—	April 11, 2002	Socorro	LINEAR	·	3.5 km	MPC · JPL
112022	2002 GG_{176}	—	April 12, 2002	Socorro	LINEAR	V	1.3 km	MPC · JPL
112023	2002 GO_{178}	—	April 10, 2002	Palomar	NEAT	(5)	2.2 km	MPC · JPL
112024	2002 HY_{1}	—	April 16, 2002	Socorro	LINEAR	V	1.6 km	MPC · JPL
112025	2002 HE_{3}	—	April 16, 2002	Socorro	LINEAR	·	1.9 km	MPC · JPL
112026	2002 HZ_{4}	—	April 16, 2002	Socorro	LINEAR	·	2.0 km	MPC · JPL
112027	2002 HL_{5}	—	April 16, 2002	Socorro	LINEAR	·	2.3 km	MPC · JPL
112028	2002 HZ_{6}	—	April 18, 2002	Haleakala	NEAT	·	1.4 km	MPC · JPL
112029	2002 HB_{7}	—	April 19, 2002	Palomar	NEAT	·	1.6 km	MPC · JPL
112030	2002 HF_{7}	—	April 18, 2002	Desert Eagle	W. K. Y. Yeung	·	1.9 km	MPC · JPL
112031	2002 HH_{7}	—	April 18, 2002	Desert Eagle	W. K. Y. Yeung	·	2.5 km	MPC · JPL
112032	2002 HJ_{8}	—	April 18, 2002	Socorro	LINEAR	NYS	2.1 km	MPC · JPL
112033	2002 HO_{9}	—	April 17, 2002	Socorro	LINEAR	·	1.2 km	MPC · JPL
112034	2002 HT_{9}	—	April 17, 2002	Socorro	LINEAR	·	2.6 km	MPC · JPL
112035	2002 HW_{10}	—	April 18, 2002	Palomar	NEAT	·	7.3 km	MPC · JPL
112036	2002 HZ_{11}	—	April 30, 2002	Palomar	NEAT	H	1.4 km	MPC · JPL
112037	2002 HH_{12}	—	April 30, 2002	Palomar	NEAT	·	1.3 km	MPC · JPL
112038	2002 HL_{12}	—	April 30, 2002	Palomar	NEAT	·	2.1 km	MPC · JPL
112039	2002 HU_{13}	—	April 21, 2002	Socorro	LINEAR	PHO	2.7 km	MPC · JPL
112040	2002 HU_{14}	—	April 17, 2002	Socorro	LINEAR	·	2.8 km	MPC · JPL
112041	2002 JG	—	May 3, 2002	Desert Eagle	W. K. Y. Yeung	(2076)	1.5 km	MPC · JPL
112042	2002 JR_{1}	—	May 4, 2002	Desert Eagle	W. K. Y. Yeung	(1338) (FLO)	1.2 km	MPC · JPL
112043	2002 JB_{2}	—	May 4, 2002	Desert Eagle	W. K. Y. Yeung	·	1.7 km	MPC · JPL
112044	2002 JO_{4}	—	May 5, 2002	Socorro	LINEAR	·	3.0 km	MPC · JPL
112045	2002 JP_{4}	—	May 5, 2002	Socorro	LINEAR	H	1.3 km	MPC · JPL
112046	2002 JR_{7}	—	May 4, 2002	Palomar	NEAT	·	5.8 km	MPC · JPL
112047	2002 JG_{8}	—	May 6, 2002	Palomar	NEAT	·	2.8 km	MPC · JPL
112048	2002 JL_{8}	—	May 6, 2002	Palomar	NEAT	·	2.7 km	MPC · JPL
112049	2002 JP_{8}	—	May 6, 2002	Palomar	NEAT	·	2.0 km	MPC · JPL
112050	2002 JF_{9}	—	May 7, 2002	Tebbutt	F. B. Zoltowski	·	1.3 km	MPC · JPL
112051	2002 JL_{9}	—	May 7, 2002	Kitt Peak	Spacewatch	HYG	5.8 km	MPC · JPL
112052	2002 JG_{10}	—	May 7, 2002	Socorro	LINEAR	H	1.3 km	MPC · JPL
112053	2002 JE_{13}	—	May 8, 2002	Desert Eagle	W. K. Y. Yeung	·	2.1 km	MPC · JPL
112054	2002 JF_{13}	—	May 8, 2002	Desert Eagle	W. K. Y. Yeung	·	1.7 km	MPC · JPL
112055	2002 JH_{13}	—	May 8, 2002	Desert Eagle	W. K. Y. Yeung	·	1.8 km	MPC · JPL
112056	2002 JK_{13}	—	May 8, 2002	Desert Eagle	W. K. Y. Yeung	·	3.0 km	MPC · JPL
112057	2002 JO_{13}	—	May 6, 2002	Kitt Peak	Spacewatch	V	1.3 km	MPC · JPL
112058	2002 JR_{13}	—	May 6, 2002	Socorro	LINEAR	H	1.1 km	MPC · JPL
112059	2002 JS_{13}	—	May 6, 2002	Socorro	LINEAR	H	1.2 km	MPC · JPL
112060	2002 JT_{13}	—	May 6, 2002	Socorro	LINEAR	PHO	2.3 km	MPC · JPL
112061	2002 JT_{14}	—	May 8, 2002	Socorro	LINEAR	·	5.3 km	MPC · JPL
112062	2002 JD_{15}	—	May 8, 2002	Socorro	LINEAR	·	1.2 km	MPC · JPL
112063	2002 JA_{16}	—	May 7, 2002	Kleť	Kleť	H	1.1 km	MPC · JPL
112064	2002 JL_{16}	—	May 8, 2002	Socorro	LINEAR	·	1.8 km	MPC · JPL
112065	2002 JM_{16}	—	May 8, 2002	Socorro	LINEAR	H	890 m	MPC · JPL
112066	2002 JC_{17}	—	May 7, 2002	Palomar	NEAT	·	2.7 km	MPC · JPL
112067	2002 JD_{17}	—	May 7, 2002	Palomar	NEAT	·	1.8 km	MPC · JPL
112068	2002 JN_{17}	—	May 7, 2002	Palomar	NEAT	·	1.2 km	MPC · JPL
112069	2002 JD_{18}	—	May 7, 2002	Palomar	NEAT	·	1.3 km	MPC · JPL
112070	2002 JR_{19}	—	May 7, 2002	Palomar	NEAT	·	1.5 km	MPC · JPL
112071	2002 JV_{20}	—	May 7, 2002	Palomar	NEAT	·	3.2 km	MPC · JPL
112072	2002 JF_{21}	—	May 8, 2002	Haleakala	NEAT	·	1.5 km	MPC · JPL
112073	2002 JP_{21}	—	May 9, 2002	Desert Eagle	W. K. Y. Yeung	·	2.8 km	MPC · JPL
112074	2002 JC_{22}	—	May 7, 2002	Socorro	LINEAR	·	2.7 km	MPC · JPL
112075	2002 JE_{22}	—	May 8, 2002	Socorro	LINEAR	·	1.6 km	MPC · JPL
112076	2002 JG_{22}	—	May 8, 2002	Socorro	LINEAR	·	1.6 km	MPC · JPL
112077	2002 JL_{22}	—	May 8, 2002	Socorro	LINEAR	·	1.4 km	MPC · JPL
112078	2002 JO_{23}	—	May 8, 2002	Socorro	LINEAR	·	1.0 km	MPC · JPL
112079	2002 JV_{24}	—	May 8, 2002	Socorro	LINEAR	NYS	1.8 km	MPC · JPL
112080	2002 JA_{25}	—	May 8, 2002	Socorro	LINEAR	·	1.7 km	MPC · JPL
112081	2002 JG_{25}	—	May 8, 2002	Socorro	LINEAR	·	2.2 km	MPC · JPL
112082	2002 JX_{25}	—	May 8, 2002	Socorro	LINEAR	·	2.0 km	MPC · JPL
112083	2002 JC_{26}	—	May 8, 2002	Socorro	LINEAR	·	1.4 km	MPC · JPL
112084	2002 JQ_{26}	—	May 8, 2002	Socorro	LINEAR	·	1.8 km	MPC · JPL
112085	2002 JK_{27}	—	May 8, 2002	Socorro	LINEAR	EOS	3.8 km	MPC · JPL
112086	2002 JO_{27}	—	May 8, 2002	Socorro	LINEAR	·	1.4 km	MPC · JPL
112087	2002 JY_{27}	—	May 9, 2002	Socorro	LINEAR	V	1.4 km	MPC · JPL
112088	2002 JZ_{27}	—	May 9, 2002	Socorro	LINEAR	·	1.7 km	MPC · JPL
112089	2002 JM_{28}	—	May 9, 2002	Socorro	LINEAR	·	2.2 km	MPC · JPL
112090	2002 JD_{30}	—	May 9, 2002	Socorro	LINEAR	WIT	1.9 km	MPC · JPL
112091	2002 JU_{30}	—	May 9, 2002	Socorro	LINEAR	·	1.5 km	MPC · JPL
112092	2002 JA_{31}	—	May 9, 2002	Socorro	LINEAR	V	1.4 km	MPC · JPL
112093	2002 JM_{31}	—	May 9, 2002	Socorro	LINEAR	·	1.2 km	MPC · JPL
112094	2002 JB_{32}	—	May 9, 2002	Socorro	LINEAR	·	2.5 km	MPC · JPL
112095	2002 JT_{32}	—	May 9, 2002	Socorro	LINEAR	·	1.2 km	MPC · JPL
112096	2002 JA_{33}	—	May 9, 2002	Socorro	LINEAR	·	1.5 km	MPC · JPL
112097	2002 JG_{33}	—	May 9, 2002	Socorro	LINEAR	·	1.7 km	MPC · JPL
112098	2002 JL_{33}	—	May 9, 2002	Socorro	LINEAR	·	1.8 km	MPC · JPL
112099	2002 JZ_{33}	—	May 9, 2002	Socorro	LINEAR	NYS	2.4 km	MPC · JPL
112100	2002 JZ_{34}	—	May 9, 2002	Socorro	LINEAR	·	3.0 km	MPC · JPL

== 112101–112200 ==
back to top

Designation			Discovery			Properties		Ref
Permanent	Provisional	Named after	Date	Site	Discoverer(s)	Category	Diam.	Ref
112101	2002 JB_{35}	—	May 9, 2002	Socorro	LINEAR	·	1.2 km	MPC · JPL
112102	2002 JL_{35}	—	May 9, 2002	Socorro	LINEAR	·	2.0 km	MPC · JPL
112103	2002 JF_{36}	—	May 9, 2002	Socorro	LINEAR	·	1.2 km	MPC · JPL
112104	2002 JV_{37}	—	May 8, 2002	Haleakala	NEAT	·	1.3 km	MPC · JPL
112105	2002 JX_{37}	—	May 8, 2002	Haleakala	NEAT	·	1.3 km	MPC · JPL
112106	2002 JF_{38}	—	May 9, 2002	Palomar	NEAT	H	1.2 km	MPC · JPL
112107	2002 JT_{38}	—	May 9, 2002	Palomar	NEAT	VER	5.4 km	MPC · JPL
112108	2002 JC_{39}	—	May 9, 2002	Palomar	NEAT	BAP	1.5 km	MPC · JPL
112109	2002 JD_{39}	—	May 9, 2002	Haleakala	NEAT	·	1.9 km	MPC · JPL
112110	2002 JP_{39}	—	May 10, 2002	Desert Eagle	W. K. Y. Yeung	·	1.5 km	MPC · JPL
112111	2002 JC_{40}	—	May 8, 2002	Socorro	LINEAR	·	9.2 km	MPC · JPL
112112	2002 JF_{41}	—	May 8, 2002	Socorro	LINEAR	·	2.0 km	MPC · JPL
112113	2002 JP_{43}	—	May 9, 2002	Socorro	LINEAR	·	1.5 km	MPC · JPL
112114	2002 JE_{44}	—	May 9, 2002	Socorro	LINEAR	·	1.6 km	MPC · JPL
112115	2002 JR_{44}	—	May 9, 2002	Socorro	LINEAR	·	1.5 km	MPC · JPL
112116	2002 JW_{44}	—	May 9, 2002	Socorro	LINEAR	V	1.2 km	MPC · JPL
112117	2002 JX_{44}	—	May 9, 2002	Socorro	LINEAR	V	1.4 km	MPC · JPL
112118	2002 JQ_{46}	—	May 9, 2002	Socorro	LINEAR	·	1.3 km	MPC · JPL
112119	2002 JR_{46}	—	May 9, 2002	Socorro	LINEAR	·	1.4 km	MPC · JPL
112120	2002 JS_{46}	—	May 9, 2002	Socorro	LINEAR	·	5.5 km	MPC · JPL
112121	2002 JT_{46}	—	May 9, 2002	Socorro	LINEAR	·	3.0 km	MPC · JPL
112122	2002 JY_{46}	—	May 9, 2002	Socorro	LINEAR	NYS	2.4 km	MPC · JPL
112123	2002 JZ_{46}	—	May 9, 2002	Socorro	LINEAR	·	3.2 km	MPC · JPL
112124	2002 JS_{47}	—	May 9, 2002	Socorro	LINEAR	·	1.5 km	MPC · JPL
112125	2002 JT_{47}	—	May 9, 2002	Socorro	LINEAR	·	6.2 km	MPC · JPL
112126	2002 JV_{47}	—	May 9, 2002	Socorro	LINEAR	·	1.4 km	MPC · JPL
112127	2002 JW_{47}	—	May 9, 2002	Socorro	LINEAR	·	1.1 km	MPC · JPL
112128	2002 JA_{48}	—	May 9, 2002	Socorro	LINEAR	·	1.4 km	MPC · JPL
112129	2002 JG_{48}	—	May 9, 2002	Socorro	LINEAR	·	1.5 km	MPC · JPL
112130	2002 JF_{49}	—	May 9, 2002	Socorro	LINEAR	·	3.2 km	MPC · JPL
112131	2002 JA_{50}	—	May 9, 2002	Socorro	LINEAR	MAS	1.3 km	MPC · JPL
112132	2002 JF_{50}	—	May 9, 2002	Socorro	LINEAR	·	1.4 km	MPC · JPL
112133	2002 JL_{52}	—	May 9, 2002	Socorro	LINEAR	·	1.3 km	MPC · JPL
112134	2002 JO_{52}	—	May 9, 2002	Socorro	LINEAR	·	1.1 km	MPC · JPL
112135	2002 JS_{52}	—	May 9, 2002	Socorro	LINEAR	MAS	1.3 km	MPC · JPL
112136	2002 JB_{53}	—	May 9, 2002	Socorro	LINEAR	V	1.1 km	MPC · JPL
112137	2002 JE_{56}	—	May 9, 2002	Socorro	LINEAR	MAS	1.3 km	MPC · JPL
112138	2002 JE_{58}	—	May 9, 2002	Socorro	LINEAR	·	2.1 km	MPC · JPL
112139	2002 JV_{58}	—	May 9, 2002	Socorro	LINEAR	·	1.5 km	MPC · JPL
112140	2002 JQ_{59}	—	May 9, 2002	Socorro	LINEAR	·	1.7 km	MPC · JPL
112141	2002 JT_{59}	—	May 9, 2002	Socorro	LINEAR	·	1.8 km	MPC · JPL
112142	2002 JV_{61}	—	May 8, 2002	Socorro	LINEAR	·	3.5 km	MPC · JPL
112143	2002 JY_{62}	—	May 8, 2002	Socorro	LINEAR	·	2.0 km	MPC · JPL
112144	2002 JS_{63}	—	May 9, 2002	Socorro	LINEAR	·	1.7 km	MPC · JPL
112145	2002 JL_{64}	—	May 9, 2002	Socorro	LINEAR	·	1.5 km	MPC · JPL
112146	2002 JZ_{64}	—	May 9, 2002	Socorro	LINEAR	·	1.4 km	MPC · JPL
112147	2002 JH_{65}	—	May 9, 2002	Socorro	LINEAR	·	2.0 km	MPC · JPL
112148	2002 JK_{65}	—	May 9, 2002	Socorro	LINEAR	·	1.9 km	MPC · JPL
112149	2002 JJ_{67}	—	May 10, 2002	Socorro	LINEAR	·	3.8 km	MPC · JPL
112150	2002 JK_{69}	—	May 7, 2002	Socorro	LINEAR	V	1.5 km	MPC · JPL
112151	2002 JF_{71}	—	May 8, 2002	Socorro	LINEAR	·	1.7 km	MPC · JPL
112152	2002 JO_{71}	—	May 8, 2002	Socorro	LINEAR	·	2.8 km	MPC · JPL
112153	2002 JP_{71}	—	May 8, 2002	Socorro	LINEAR	·	1.6 km	MPC · JPL
112154	2002 JA_{72}	—	May 8, 2002	Socorro	LINEAR	·	4.2 km	MPC · JPL
112155	2002 JC_{73}	—	May 8, 2002	Socorro	LINEAR	·	1.4 km	MPC · JPL
112156	2002 JX_{73}	—	May 8, 2002	Socorro	LINEAR	·	1.7 km	MPC · JPL
112157	2002 JK_{75}	—	May 9, 2002	Socorro	LINEAR	·	2.2 km	MPC · JPL
112158	2002 JL_{76}	—	May 11, 2002	Socorro	LINEAR	·	2.1 km	MPC · JPL
112159	2002 JD_{77}	—	May 11, 2002	Socorro	LINEAR	·	2.8 km	MPC · JPL
112160	2002 JG_{77}	—	May 11, 2002	Socorro	LINEAR	·	1.3 km	MPC · JPL
112161	2002 JH_{78}	—	May 11, 2002	Socorro	LINEAR	·	3.9 km	MPC · JPL
112162	2002 JS_{78}	—	May 11, 2002	Socorro	LINEAR	·	1.8 km	MPC · JPL
112163	2002 JZ_{79}	—	May 11, 2002	Socorro	LINEAR	·	2.9 km	MPC · JPL
112164	2002 JH_{80}	—	May 11, 2002	Socorro	LINEAR	·	1.7 km	MPC · JPL
112165	2002 JO_{80}	—	May 11, 2002	Socorro	LINEAR	·	2.4 km	MPC · JPL
112166	2002 JT_{80}	—	May 11, 2002	Socorro	LINEAR	·	1.8 km	MPC · JPL
112167	2002 JM_{81}	—	May 11, 2002	Socorro	LINEAR	·	1.6 km	MPC · JPL
112168	2002 JR_{81}	—	May 11, 2002	Socorro	LINEAR	·	1.6 km	MPC · JPL
112169	2002 JX_{81}	—	May 11, 2002	Socorro	LINEAR	·	1.6 km	MPC · JPL
112170	2002 JQ_{91}	—	May 11, 2002	Socorro	LINEAR	·	1.3 km	MPC · JPL
112171	2002 JQ_{93}	—	May 11, 2002	Socorro	LINEAR	·	1.3 km	MPC · JPL
112172	2002 JY_{93}	—	May 11, 2002	Socorro	LINEAR	·	1.7 km	MPC · JPL
112173	2002 JP_{94}	—	May 11, 2002	Socorro	LINEAR	·	1.5 km	MPC · JPL
112174	2002 JV_{94}	—	May 11, 2002	Socorro	LINEAR	·	2.0 km	MPC · JPL
112175	2002 JP_{95}	—	May 11, 2002	Socorro	LINEAR	·	1.5 km	MPC · JPL
112176	2002 JT_{95}	—	May 11, 2002	Socorro	LINEAR	·	2.1 km	MPC · JPL
112177	2002 JA_{96}	—	May 11, 2002	Socorro	LINEAR	·	1.1 km	MPC · JPL
112178	2002 JZ_{96}	—	May 11, 2002	Palomar	NEAT	·	2.1 km	MPC · JPL
112179	2002 JO_{97}	—	May 9, 2002	Socorro	LINEAR	H	1.3 km	MPC · JPL
112180	2002 JE_{98}	—	May 8, 2002	Socorro	LINEAR	·	2.5 km	MPC · JPL
112181	2002 JJ_{98}	—	May 9, 2002	Socorro	LINEAR	GEF	3.0 km	MPC · JPL
112182	2002 JV_{98}	—	May 8, 2002	Anderson Mesa	LONEOS	(2076)	1.5 km	MPC · JPL
112183	2002 JD_{100}	—	May 12, 2002	Socorro	LINEAR	·	2.6 km	MPC · JPL
112184	2002 JG_{100}	—	May 13, 2002	Socorro	LINEAR	·	1.3 km	MPC · JPL
112185	2002 JU_{101}	—	May 9, 2002	Socorro	LINEAR	·	2.6 km	MPC · JPL
112186	2002 JJ_{102}	—	May 9, 2002	Socorro	LINEAR	·	1.8 km	MPC · JPL
112187	2002 JP_{102}	—	May 9, 2002	Socorro	LINEAR	MAS	1.1 km	MPC · JPL
112188	2002 JL_{104}	—	May 10, 2002	Socorro	LINEAR	·	2.2 km	MPC · JPL
112189	2002 JO_{104}	—	May 11, 2002	Socorro	LINEAR	·	2.4 km	MPC · JPL
112190	2002 JF_{105}	—	May 12, 2002	Socorro	LINEAR	·	1.4 km	MPC · JPL
112191	2002 JU_{105}	—	May 12, 2002	Socorro	LINEAR	·	3.1 km	MPC · JPL
112192	2002 JR_{106}	—	May 11, 2002	Palomar	NEAT	V	1.1 km	MPC · JPL
112193	2002 JA_{109}	—	May 6, 2002	Socorro	LINEAR	PHO	2.2 km	MPC · JPL
112194	2002 JG_{110}	—	May 11, 2002	Socorro	LINEAR	·	1.2 km	MPC · JPL
112195	2002 JM_{110}	—	May 11, 2002	Socorro	LINEAR	·	2.5 km	MPC · JPL
112196	2002 JC_{111}	—	May 11, 2002	Socorro	LINEAR	·	1.9 km	MPC · JPL
112197	2002 JV_{111}	—	May 11, 2002	Socorro	LINEAR	·	1.8 km	MPC · JPL
112198	2002 JB_{112}	—	May 11, 2002	Socorro	LINEAR	·	1.9 km	MPC · JPL
112199	2002 JV_{113}	—	May 15, 2002	Palomar	NEAT	·	1.4 km	MPC · JPL
112200	2002 JG_{117}	—	May 4, 2002	Palomar	NEAT	·	1.5 km	MPC · JPL

== 112201–112300 ==
back to top

Designation			Discovery			Properties		Ref
Permanent	Provisional	Named after	Date	Site	Discoverer(s)	Category	Diam.	Ref
112201	2002 JJ_{118}	—	May 5, 2002	Palomar	NEAT	MAR	2.5 km	MPC · JPL
112202	2002 JK_{120}	—	May 5, 2002	Kitt Peak	Spacewatch	·	1.6 km	MPC · JPL
112203	2002 JG_{122}	—	May 6, 2002	Anderson Mesa	LONEOS	V	1.3 km	MPC · JPL
112204	2002 JT_{122}	—	May 6, 2002	Palomar	NEAT	EOS	4.9 km	MPC · JPL
112205	2002 JR_{123}	—	May 6, 2002	Kitt Peak	Spacewatch	·	2.5 km	MPC · JPL
112206	2002 JT_{123}	—	May 6, 2002	Kitt Peak	Spacewatch	·	1.5 km	MPC · JPL
112207	2002 JQ_{127}	—	May 7, 2002	Palomar	NEAT	·	3.8 km	MPC · JPL
112208	2002 JA_{132}	—	May 9, 2002	Palomar	NEAT	·	2.0 km	MPC · JPL
112209	2002 JX_{133}	—	May 9, 2002	Socorro	LINEAR	·	1.4 km	MPC · JPL
112210	2002 JZ_{133}	—	May 9, 2002	Socorro	LINEAR	·	1.1 km	MPC · JPL
112211	2002 JL_{135}	—	May 9, 2002	Socorro	LINEAR	MAS	1.1 km	MPC · JPL
112212	2002 JS_{135}	—	May 9, 2002	Socorro	LINEAR	·	1.1 km	MPC · JPL
112213	2002 JT_{135}	—	May 9, 2002	Socorro	LINEAR	·	1.3 km	MPC · JPL
112214	2002 JD_{136}	—	May 9, 2002	Socorro	LINEAR	·	1.3 km	MPC · JPL
112215	2002 JR_{139}	—	May 10, 2002	Palomar	NEAT	·	1.1 km	MPC · JPL
112216	2002 JH_{141}	—	May 10, 2002	Palomar	NEAT	·	1.6 km	MPC · JPL
112217	2002 JJ_{142}	—	May 11, 2002	Anderson Mesa	LONEOS	·	4.7 km	MPC · JPL
112218	2002 JF_{148}	—	May 2, 2002	Haleakala	White, M., M. Collins	·	2.0 km	MPC · JPL
112219	2002 KV	—	May 16, 2002	Haleakala	NEAT	·	1.8 km	MPC · JPL
112220	2002 KC_{4}	—	May 16, 2002	Haleakala	NEAT	·	4.1 km	MPC · JPL
112221	2002 KH_{4}	—	May 22, 2002	Socorro	LINEAR	T_{j} (2.91) · AMO +1km	2.8 km	MPC · JPL
112222	2002 KS_{4}	—	May 16, 2002	Socorro	LINEAR	·	1.7 km	MPC · JPL
112223	2002 KE_{6}	—	May 23, 2002	Palomar	NEAT	NYS	2.9 km	MPC · JPL
112224	2002 KD_{9}	—	May 29, 2002	Haleakala	NEAT	·	2.2 km	MPC · JPL
112225	2002 KX_{9}	—	May 16, 2002	Socorro	LINEAR	NYS	1.8 km	MPC · JPL
112226	2002 KO_{12}	—	May 17, 2002	Socorro	LINEAR	·	1.1 km	MPC · JPL
112227	2002 KS_{12}	—	May 17, 2002	Kitt Peak	Spacewatch	·	3.3 km	MPC · JPL
112228	2002 KX_{13}	—	May 21, 2002	Socorro	LINEAR	·	1.6 km	MPC · JPL
112229	2002 KZ_{13}	—	May 21, 2002	Socorro	LINEAR	·	1.6 km	MPC · JPL
112230	2002 KA_{14}	—	May 27, 2002	Haleakala	NEAT	LIX	9.4 km	MPC · JPL
112231	2002 KF_{14}	—	May 30, 2002	Palomar	NEAT	·	2.6 km	MPC · JPL
112232	2002 KK_{14}	—	May 30, 2002	Palomar	NEAT	·	3.1 km	MPC · JPL
112233 Kammerer	2002 KC_{15}	Kammerer	May 16, 2002	Palomar	M. Meyer	·	1.7 km	MPC · JPL
112234	2002 LB	—	June 1, 2002	Palomar	NEAT	·	2.4 km	MPC · JPL
112235	2002 LF	—	June 1, 2002	Palomar	NEAT	·	1.7 km	MPC · JPL
112236	2002 LU	—	June 2, 2002	Socorro	LINEAR	HNS	2.4 km	MPC · JPL
112237	2002 LK_{1}	—	June 2, 2002	Palomar	NEAT	·	1.3 km	MPC · JPL
112238	2002 LT_{1}	—	June 2, 2002	Palomar	NEAT	·	1.6 km	MPC · JPL
112239	2002 LX_{1}	—	June 2, 2002	Palomar	NEAT	·	1.2 km	MPC · JPL
112240	2002 LZ_{3}	—	June 5, 2002	Socorro	LINEAR	V	1.2 km	MPC · JPL
112241	2002 LL_{4}	—	June 5, 2002	Socorro	LINEAR	·	1.8 km	MPC · JPL
112242	2002 LP_{4}	—	June 5, 2002	Socorro	LINEAR	(2076)	1.6 km	MPC · JPL
112243	2002 LZ_{4}	—	June 5, 2002	Socorro	LINEAR	·	1.8 km	MPC · JPL
112244	2002 LD_{5}	—	June 4, 2002	Palomar	NEAT	·	1.8 km	MPC · JPL
112245	2002 LK_{5}	—	June 6, 2002	Fountain Hills	C. W. Juels, P. R. Holvorcem	·	2.9 km	MPC · JPL
112246	2002 LH_{7}	—	June 2, 2002	Palomar	NEAT	·	1.4 km	MPC · JPL
112247	2002 LY_{8}	—	June 5, 2002	Socorro	LINEAR	·	1.6 km	MPC · JPL
112248	2002 LG_{9}	—	June 5, 2002	Socorro	LINEAR	·	4.0 km	MPC · JPL
112249	2002 LM_{9}	—	June 5, 2002	Socorro	LINEAR	·	1.5 km	MPC · JPL
112250	2002 LG_{10}	—	June 5, 2002	Socorro	LINEAR	(2076)	1.5 km	MPC · JPL
112251	2002 LO_{10}	—	June 5, 2002	Socorro	LINEAR	·	1.5 km	MPC · JPL
112252	2002 LU_{10}	—	June 5, 2002	Socorro	LINEAR	·	1.6 km	MPC · JPL
112253	2002 LD_{11}	—	June 5, 2002	Socorro	LINEAR	·	2.3 km	MPC · JPL
112254	2002 LD_{12}	—	June 5, 2002	Socorro	LINEAR	·	2.1 km	MPC · JPL
112255	2002 LJ_{12}	—	June 5, 2002	Socorro	LINEAR	·	1.4 km	MPC · JPL
112256	2002 LR_{12}	—	June 5, 2002	Socorro	LINEAR	·	7.1 km	MPC · JPL
112257	2002 LC_{13}	—	June 5, 2002	Socorro	LINEAR	·	1.6 km	MPC · JPL
112258	2002 LR_{13}	—	June 6, 2002	Socorro	LINEAR	·	2.1 km	MPC · JPL
112259	2002 LY_{13}	—	June 6, 2002	Socorro	LINEAR	NYS	1.4 km	MPC · JPL
112260	2002 LG_{14}	—	June 6, 2002	Socorro	LINEAR	·	1.8 km	MPC · JPL
112261	2002 LT_{15}	—	June 6, 2002	Socorro	LINEAR	·	1.9 km	MPC · JPL
112262	2002 LV_{15}	—	June 6, 2002	Socorro	LINEAR	·	2.0 km	MPC · JPL
112263	2002 LN_{16}	—	June 6, 2002	Socorro	LINEAR	·	2.0 km	MPC · JPL
112264	2002 LW_{16}	—	June 6, 2002	Socorro	LINEAR	·	2.5 km	MPC · JPL
112265	2002 LM_{17}	—	June 6, 2002	Socorro	LINEAR	NYS	2.3 km	MPC · JPL
112266	2002 LP_{19}	—	June 6, 2002	Socorro	LINEAR	·	2.5 km	MPC · JPL
112267	2002 LA_{20}	—	June 6, 2002	Socorro	LINEAR	NYS	2.4 km	MPC · JPL
112268	2002 LX_{20}	—	June 6, 2002	Socorro	LINEAR	·	12 km	MPC · JPL
112269	2002 LM_{21}	—	June 6, 2002	Socorro	LINEAR	NYS	2.7 km	MPC · JPL
112270	2002 LP_{21}	—	June 6, 2002	Socorro	LINEAR	·	2.2 km	MPC · JPL
112271	2002 LQ_{21}	—	June 6, 2002	Socorro	LINEAR	·	2.7 km	MPC · JPL
112272	2002 LZ_{22}	—	June 8, 2002	Socorro	LINEAR	·	3.9 km	MPC · JPL
112273	2002 LL_{23}	—	June 8, 2002	Socorro	LINEAR	EOS	4.4 km	MPC · JPL
112274	2002 LR_{23}	—	June 8, 2002	Socorro	LINEAR	·	2.2 km	MPC · JPL
112275	2002 LG_{24}	—	June 9, 2002	Desert Eagle	W. K. Y. Yeung	·	2.5 km	MPC · JPL
112276	2002 LK_{24}	—	June 7, 2002	Fountain Hills	C. W. Juels, P. R. Holvorcem	PHO	1.8 km	MPC · JPL
112277	2002 LO_{25}	—	June 5, 2002	Socorro	LINEAR	·	1.8 km	MPC · JPL
112278	2002 LK_{26}	—	June 6, 2002	Socorro	LINEAR	·	1.2 km	MPC · JPL
112279	2002 LN_{26}	—	June 6, 2002	Socorro	LINEAR	·	1.5 km	MPC · JPL
112280	2002 LU_{27}	—	June 9, 2002	Socorro	LINEAR	·	1.3 km	MPC · JPL
112281	2002 LG_{28}	—	June 9, 2002	Socorro	LINEAR	·	1.9 km	MPC · JPL
112282	2002 LL_{28}	—	June 9, 2002	Socorro	LINEAR	·	2.0 km	MPC · JPL
112283	2002 LS_{28}	—	June 9, 2002	Socorro	LINEAR	·	1.8 km	MPC · JPL
112284	2002 LK_{29}	—	June 9, 2002	Socorro	LINEAR	EUN	2.5 km	MPC · JPL
112285	2002 LN_{30}	—	June 2, 2002	Palomar	NEAT	·	1.4 km	MPC · JPL
112286	2002 LP_{30}	—	June 2, 2002	Anderson Mesa	LONEOS	·	3.5 km	MPC · JPL
112287	2002 LZ_{30}	—	June 4, 2002	Palomar	NEAT	·	1.5 km	MPC · JPL
112288	2002 LK_{31}	—	June 10, 2002	Reedy Creek	J. Broughton	·	1.7 km	MPC · JPL
112289	2002 LL_{32}	—	June 9, 2002	Palomar	NEAT	·	5.0 km	MPC · JPL
112290	2002 LB_{33}	—	June 3, 2002	Socorro	LINEAR	TIR	5.4 km	MPC · JPL
112291	2002 LO_{33}	—	June 5, 2002	Palomar	NEAT	·	2.5 km	MPC · JPL
112292	2002 LJ_{35}	—	June 12, 2002	Fountain Hills	C. W. Juels, P. R. Holvorcem	(2076)	1.7 km	MPC · JPL
112293	2002 LD_{36}	—	June 9, 2002	Socorro	LINEAR	·	2.9 km	MPC · JPL
112294	2002 LU_{36}	—	June 9, 2002	Socorro	LINEAR	·	2.2 km	MPC · JPL
112295	2002 LA_{37}	—	June 9, 2002	Socorro	LINEAR	·	2.3 km	MPC · JPL
112296	2002 LO_{37}	—	June 12, 2002	Socorro	LINEAR	·	5.4 km	MPC · JPL
112297	2002 LC_{39}	—	June 9, 2002	Socorro	LINEAR	·	1.4 km	MPC · JPL
112298	2002 LF_{39}	—	June 10, 2002	Socorro	LINEAR	·	4.1 km	MPC · JPL
112299	2002 LK_{39}	—	June 10, 2002	Socorro	LINEAR	GEF	2.1 km	MPC · JPL
112300	2002 LC_{41}	—	June 10, 2002	Socorro	LINEAR	·	2.7 km	MPC · JPL

== 112301–112400 ==
back to top

Designation			Discovery			Properties		Ref
Permanent	Provisional	Named after	Date	Site	Discoverer(s)	Category	Diam.	Ref
112301	2002 LY_{42}	—	June 10, 2002	Socorro	LINEAR	·	1.7 km	MPC · JPL
112302	2002 LC_{44}	—	June 9, 2002	Haleakala	NEAT	·	1.2 km	MPC · JPL
112303	2002 LK_{44}	—	June 4, 2002	Palomar	NEAT	·	1.6 km	MPC · JPL
112304	2002 LJ_{46}	—	June 11, 2002	Socorro	LINEAR	·	5.7 km	MPC · JPL
112305	2002 LL_{46}	—	June 11, 2002	Socorro	LINEAR	·	5.2 km	MPC · JPL
112306	2002 LL_{47}	—	June 12, 2002	Socorro	LINEAR	·	3.8 km	MPC · JPL
112307	2002 LQ_{47}	—	June 12, 2002	Socorro	LINEAR	·	3.6 km	MPC · JPL
112308	2002 LR_{47}	—	June 12, 2002	Socorro	LINEAR	PHO	4.4 km	MPC · JPL
112309	2002 LQ_{48}	—	June 10, 2002	Palomar	NEAT	EOS	4.4 km	MPC · JPL
112310	2002 LV_{48}	—	June 12, 2002	Palomar	NEAT	NYS ·	3.4 km	MPC · JPL
112311	2002 LV_{54}	—	June 9, 2002	Socorro	LINEAR	·	1.6 km	MPC · JPL
112312	2002 LW_{54}	—	June 9, 2002	Socorro	LINEAR	·	1.4 km	MPC · JPL
112313 Larrylines	2002 LL_{55}	Larrylines	June 12, 2002	Needville	J. Dellinger, P. Garossino	RAF	1.8 km	MPC · JPL
112314	2002 LN_{56}	—	June 9, 2002	Anderson Mesa	LONEOS	·	3.7 km	MPC · JPL
112315	2002 LA_{59}	—	June 10, 2002	Socorro	LINEAR	·	2.8 km	MPC · JPL
112316	2002 LC_{59}	—	June 10, 2002	Socorro	LINEAR	·	4.3 km	MPC · JPL
112317	2002 LO_{59}	—	June 6, 2002	Socorro	LINEAR	·	1.5 km	MPC · JPL
112318	2002 LD_{60}	—	June 10, 2002	Socorro	LINEAR	·	1.7 km	MPC · JPL
112319	2002 MM	—	June 17, 2002	Needville	J. Dellinger	·	2.5 km	MPC · JPL
112320 Danielegardiol	2002 MB_{1}	Danielegardiol	June 19, 2002	Campo Imperatore	M. Di Martino, F. Bernardi	·	4.0 km	MPC · JPL
112321	2002 MY_{1}	—	June 16, 2002	Palomar	NEAT	NYS	1.6 km	MPC · JPL
112322	2002 MC_{2}	—	June 16, 2002	Palomar	NEAT	·	3.1 km	MPC · JPL
112323	2002 MF_{2}	—	June 16, 2002	Palomar	NEAT	·	1.7 km	MPC · JPL
112324	2002 MA_{3}	—	June 24, 2002	Haleakala	NEAT	slow	1.9 km	MPC · JPL
112325	2002 MD_{3}	—	June 17, 2002	Socorro	LINEAR	(1547)	2.6 km	MPC · JPL
112326	2002 MM_{4}	—	June 22, 2002	La Palma	La Palma	·	1.9 km	MPC · JPL
112327	2002 MR_{4}	—	June 26, 2002	Palomar	NEAT	H	1.2 km	MPC · JPL
112328 Klinkerfues	2002 MU_{4}	Klinkerfues	June 16, 2002	Palomar	M. Meyer	MAS	1.2 km	MPC · JPL
112329	2002 NY	—	July 5, 2002	Kitt Peak	Spacewatch	·	5.5 km	MPC · JPL
112330	2002 NC_{1}	—	July 5, 2002	Reedy Creek	J. Broughton	·	2.0 km	MPC · JPL
112331	2002 NM_{1}	—	July 4, 2002	Palomar	NEAT	·	2.8 km	MPC · JPL
112332	2002 NT_{1}	—	July 6, 2002	Reedy Creek	J. Broughton	·	2.1 km	MPC · JPL
112333	2002 NA_{2}	—	July 6, 2002	Needville	J. Dellinger, P. G. A. Garossino	·	1.3 km	MPC · JPL
112334	2002 ND_{4}	—	July 1, 2002	Palomar	NEAT	·	2.5 km	MPC · JPL
112335	2002 NE_{4}	—	July 1, 2002	Palomar	NEAT	NYS	1.9 km	MPC · JPL
112336	2002 NJ_{4}	—	July 3, 2002	Palomar	NEAT	·	2.3 km	MPC · JPL
112337 Francescaguerra	2002 NR_{4}	Francescaguerra	July 10, 2002	Campo Imperatore	F. Bernardi	NYS	1.7 km	MPC · JPL
112338 Seneseconte	2002 NX_{5}	Seneseconte	July 10, 2002	Campo Imperatore	CINEOS	·	2.2 km	MPC · JPL
112339 Pimpa	2002 NF_{6}	Pimpa	July 11, 2002	Campo Imperatore	F. Bernardi	·	3.7 km	MPC · JPL
112340 Davidegaddi	2002 NN_{6}	Davidegaddi	July 11, 2002	Campo Imperatore	F. Bernardi	·	3.3 km	MPC · JPL
112341	2002 NY_{6}	—	July 9, 2002	Palomar	NEAT	·	2.9 km	MPC · JPL
112342	2002 NB_{7}	—	July 9, 2002	Palomar	NEAT	·	3.4 km	MPC · JPL
112343	2002 NE_{7}	—	July 9, 2002	Palomar	NEAT	·	3.6 km	MPC · JPL
112344	2002 NW_{8}	—	July 1, 2002	Palomar	NEAT	·	2.2 km	MPC · JPL
112345	2002 ND_{9}	—	July 1, 2002	Palomar	NEAT	·	1.7 km	MPC · JPL
112346	2002 NC_{10}	—	July 4, 2002	Kitt Peak	Spacewatch	·	3.3 km	MPC · JPL
112347	2002 NS_{10}	—	July 4, 2002	Palomar	NEAT	·	6.9 km	MPC · JPL
112348	2002 NU_{10}	—	July 4, 2002	Palomar	NEAT	NYS	1.4 km	MPC · JPL
112349	2002 NA_{11}	—	July 4, 2002	Palomar	NEAT	MAS	1.4 km	MPC · JPL
112350	2002 NG_{11}	—	July 4, 2002	Palomar	NEAT	·	4.8 km	MPC · JPL
112351	2002 NO_{11}	—	July 4, 2002	Palomar	NEAT	MAS	1.3 km	MPC · JPL
112352	2002 NK_{12}	—	July 4, 2002	Palomar	NEAT	·	4.1 km	MPC · JPL
112353	2002 NB_{13}	—	July 4, 2002	Palomar	NEAT	NYS	1.9 km	MPC · JPL
112354	2002 NE_{13}	—	July 4, 2002	Palomar	NEAT	NYS ·	3.5 km	MPC · JPL
112355	2002 NU_{14}	—	July 5, 2002	Socorro	LINEAR	EOS	4.9 km	MPC · JPL
112356	2002 NY_{14}	—	July 5, 2002	Socorro	LINEAR	·	3.1 km	MPC · JPL
112357	2002 NV_{15}	—	July 5, 2002	Socorro	LINEAR	·	2.1 km	MPC · JPL
112358	2002 NH_{16}	—	July 5, 2002	Socorro	LINEAR	·	2.4 km	MPC · JPL
112359	2002 NJ_{16}	—	July 5, 2002	Kitt Peak	Spacewatch	·	3.7 km	MPC · JPL
112360	2002 NU_{17}	—	July 9, 2002	Socorro	LINEAR	·	4.1 km	MPC · JPL
112361	2002 NB_{18}	—	July 9, 2002	Socorro	LINEAR	V	1.2 km	MPC · JPL
112362	2002 ND_{18}	—	July 9, 2002	Socorro	LINEAR	·	790 m	MPC · JPL
112363	2002 NH_{18}	—	July 9, 2002	Socorro	LINEAR	·	1.2 km	MPC · JPL
112364	2002 NK_{18}	—	July 9, 2002	Socorro	LINEAR	·	2.2 km	MPC · JPL
112365	2002 NS_{18}	—	July 9, 2002	Socorro	LINEAR	·	2.2 km	MPC · JPL
112366	2002 NU_{18}	—	July 9, 2002	Socorro	LINEAR	·	2.6 km	MPC · JPL
112367	2002 NV_{18}	—	July 9, 2002	Socorro	LINEAR	·	2.2 km	MPC · JPL
112368	2002 NC_{19}	—	July 9, 2002	Socorro	LINEAR	·	3.6 km	MPC · JPL
112369	2002 NV_{19}	—	July 9, 2002	Socorro	LINEAR	·	4.5 km	MPC · JPL
112370	2002 NO_{20}	—	July 9, 2002	Socorro	LINEAR	·	1.5 km	MPC · JPL
112371	2002 NV_{20}	—	July 9, 2002	Socorro	LINEAR	fast	1.4 km	MPC · JPL
112372	2002 NW_{21}	—	July 9, 2002	Socorro	LINEAR	NYS	2.1 km	MPC · JPL
112373	2002 NM_{22}	—	July 9, 2002	Socorro	LINEAR	·	1.9 km	MPC · JPL
112374	2002 NC_{24}	—	July 9, 2002	Socorro	LINEAR	·	2.3 km	MPC · JPL
112375	2002 ND_{24}	—	July 9, 2002	Socorro	LINEAR	·	1.9 km	MPC · JPL
112376	2002 NF_{24}	—	July 9, 2002	Socorro	LINEAR	EUN	2.5 km	MPC · JPL
112377	2002 NP_{24}	—	July 9, 2002	Socorro	LINEAR	·	2.4 km	MPC · JPL
112378	2002 NV_{25}	—	July 9, 2002	Socorro	LINEAR	·	2.1 km	MPC · JPL
112379	2002 NW_{25}	—	July 9, 2002	Socorro	LINEAR	V	1.6 km	MPC · JPL
112380	2002 NN_{27}	—	July 9, 2002	Socorro	LINEAR	·	870 m	MPC · JPL
112381	2002 NR_{27}	—	July 9, 2002	Socorro	LINEAR	·	2.8 km	MPC · JPL
112382	2002 NV_{27}	—	July 9, 2002	Socorro	LINEAR	·	4.8 km	MPC · JPL
112383	2002 NL_{28}	—	July 12, 2002	Palomar	NEAT	·	1.5 km	MPC · JPL
112384	2002 NO_{28}	—	July 12, 2002	Palomar	NEAT	·	5.0 km	MPC · JPL
112385	2002 NY_{28}	—	July 13, 2002	Haleakala	NEAT	·	6.5 km	MPC · JPL
112386	2002 NL_{29}	—	July 14, 2002	Reedy Creek	J. Broughton	·	1.5 km	MPC · JPL
112387	2002 NM_{29}	—	July 14, 2002	Reedy Creek	J. Broughton	·	1.8 km	MPC · JPL
112388	2002 NU_{29}	—	July 9, 2002	Socorro	LINEAR	·	3.8 km	MPC · JPL
112389	2002 NC_{31}	—	July 15, 2002	Reedy Creek	J. Broughton	·	2.3 km	MPC · JPL
112390	2002 NN_{31}	—	July 8, 2002	Palomar	NEAT	·	2.3 km	MPC · JPL
112391	2002 NZ_{32}	—	July 13, 2002	Socorro	LINEAR	(8737)	7.6 km	MPC · JPL
112392	2002 NA_{33}	—	July 13, 2002	Socorro	LINEAR	·	3.2 km	MPC · JPL
112393	2002 ND_{33}	—	July 13, 2002	Socorro	LINEAR	·	9.7 km	MPC · JPL
112394	2002 NF_{33}	—	July 13, 2002	Socorro	LINEAR	EUN	2.7 km	MPC · JPL
112395	2002 NK_{33}	—	July 13, 2002	Socorro	LINEAR	GEF	3.6 km	MPC · JPL
112396	2002 NR_{33}	—	July 13, 2002	Palomar	NEAT	NYS	1.8 km	MPC · JPL
112397	2002 NP_{35}	—	July 9, 2002	Socorro	LINEAR	RAF	1.9 km	MPC · JPL
112398	2002 NU_{35}	—	July 9, 2002	Socorro	LINEAR	V	1.0 km	MPC · JPL
112399	2002 NF_{36}	—	July 9, 2002	Socorro	LINEAR	·	2.3 km	MPC · JPL
112400	2002 NG_{36}	—	July 9, 2002	Socorro	LINEAR	·	5.2 km	MPC · JPL

== 112401–112500 ==
back to top

Designation			Discovery			Properties		Ref
Permanent	Provisional	Named after	Date	Site	Discoverer(s)	Category	Diam.	Ref
112401	2002 NN_{37}	—	July 9, 2002	Socorro	LINEAR	·	1.3 km	MPC · JPL
112402	2002 NO_{37}	—	July 9, 2002	Socorro	LINEAR	·	4.9 km	MPC · JPL
112403	2002 NZ_{37}	—	July 9, 2002	Socorro	LINEAR	·	6.4 km	MPC · JPL
112404	2002 NC_{38}	—	July 9, 2002	Socorro	LINEAR	·	1.5 km	MPC · JPL
112405	2002 NS_{38}	—	July 13, 2002	Socorro	LINEAR	HNS	2.5 km	MPC · JPL
112406	2002 NJ_{39}	—	July 13, 2002	Socorro	LINEAR	·	3.5 km	MPC · JPL
112407	2002 NU_{39}	—	July 14, 2002	Palomar	NEAT	·	4.8 km	MPC · JPL
112408	2002 NE_{40}	—	July 14, 2002	Palomar	NEAT	·	3.2 km	MPC · JPL
112409	2002 NN_{40}	—	July 14, 2002	Palomar	NEAT	KOR	2.6 km	MPC · JPL
112410	2002 NT_{40}	—	July 14, 2002	Palomar	NEAT	·	2.9 km	MPC · JPL
112411	2002 NN_{41}	—	July 14, 2002	Palomar	NEAT	·	3.3 km	MPC · JPL
112412	2002 NH_{42}	—	July 14, 2002	Palomar	NEAT	·	4.3 km	MPC · JPL
112413	2002 NQ_{42}	—	July 15, 2002	Palomar	NEAT	V	1.3 km	MPC · JPL
112414	2002 NV_{42}	—	July 15, 2002	Palomar	NEAT	CLA	2.5 km	MPC · JPL
112415	2002 NW_{42}	—	July 15, 2002	Palomar	NEAT	·	6.2 km	MPC · JPL
112416	2002 NB_{43}	—	July 15, 2002	Palomar	NEAT	·	3.8 km	MPC · JPL
112417	2002 NJ_{43}	—	July 15, 2002	Palomar	NEAT	·	2.3 km	MPC · JPL
112418	2002 NY_{44}	—	July 12, 2002	Palomar	NEAT	·	2.6 km	MPC · JPL
112419	2002 NH_{45}	—	July 13, 2002	Palomar	NEAT	·	1.6 km	MPC · JPL
112420	2002 NF_{46}	—	July 13, 2002	Palomar	NEAT	·	1.7 km	MPC · JPL
112421	2002 NT_{46}	—	July 13, 2002	Haleakala	NEAT	·	1.3 km	MPC · JPL
112422	2002 NU_{46}	—	July 13, 2002	Haleakala	NEAT	·	3.1 km	MPC · JPL
112423	2002 NH_{47}	—	July 14, 2002	Palomar	NEAT	·	1.9 km	MPC · JPL
112424	2002 NU_{47}	—	July 14, 2002	Socorro	LINEAR	·	1.5 km	MPC · JPL
112425	2002 NX_{47}	—	July 14, 2002	Socorro	LINEAR	·	2.4 km	MPC · JPL
112426	2002 NO_{48}	—	July 13, 2002	Haleakala	NEAT	·	2.8 km	MPC · JPL
112427	2002 NC_{49}	—	July 15, 2002	Palomar	NEAT	·	3.2 km	MPC · JPL
112428	2002 NP_{50}	—	July 14, 2002	Socorro	LINEAR	·	1.5 km	MPC · JPL
112429	2002 NC_{51}	—	July 4, 2002	Palomar	NEAT	V	1.4 km	MPC · JPL
112430	2002 NJ_{51}	—	July 5, 2002	Socorro	LINEAR	·	4.4 km	MPC · JPL
112431	2002 NV_{52}	—	July 14, 2002	Palomar	NEAT	NYS	1.7 km	MPC · JPL
112432	2002 ND_{53}	—	July 14, 2002	Palomar	NEAT	T_{j} (2.97)	6.1 km	MPC · JPL
112433	2002 NC_{57}	—	July 14, 2002	Palomar	S. F. Hönig	EOS	3.3 km	MPC · JPL
112434	2002 OD	—	July 16, 2002	Reedy Creek	J. Broughton	·	2.7 km	MPC · JPL
112435	2002 OO	—	July 17, 2002	Socorro	LINEAR	·	2.4 km	MPC · JPL
112436	2002 OG_{1}	—	July 17, 2002	Socorro	LINEAR	·	4.8 km	MPC · JPL
112437	2002 OA_{2}	—	July 17, 2002	Socorro	LINEAR	·	2.8 km	MPC · JPL
112438	2002 OJ_{2}	—	July 17, 2002	Socorro	LINEAR	·	4.0 km	MPC · JPL
112439	2002 OB_{3}	—	July 17, 2002	Socorro	LINEAR	GEF	3.1 km	MPC · JPL
112440	2002 OG_{3}	—	July 17, 2002	Socorro	LINEAR	PHO	1.9 km	MPC · JPL
112441	2002 OL_{3}	—	July 17, 2002	Socorro	LINEAR	EOS	7.0 km	MPC · JPL
112442	2002 OM_{3}	—	July 17, 2002	Socorro	LINEAR	T_{j} (2.98) · HIL · 3:2 · (6124)	10 km	MPC · JPL
112443	2002 OF_{4}	—	July 17, 2002	Socorro	LINEAR	EOS	5.5 km	MPC · JPL
112444	2002 OR_{4}	—	July 16, 2002	Reedy Creek	J. Broughton	·	2.3 km	MPC · JPL
112445	2002 OS_{5}	—	July 20, 2002	Palomar	NEAT	·	5.9 km	MPC · JPL
112446	2002 OV_{6}	—	July 20, 2002	Palomar	NEAT	·	4.5 km	MPC · JPL
112447	2002 OB_{7}	—	July 20, 2002	Palomar	NEAT	·	3.2 km	MPC · JPL
112448	2002 OJ_{7}	—	July 20, 2002	Palomar	NEAT	·	5.5 km	MPC · JPL
112449	2002 OD_{8}	—	July 18, 2002	Palomar	NEAT	·	6.2 km	MPC · JPL
112450	2002 OF_{8}	—	July 18, 2002	Palomar	NEAT	·	1.9 km	MPC · JPL
112451	2002 OU_{8}	—	July 21, 2002	Palomar	NEAT	·	1.6 km	MPC · JPL
112452	2002 OY_{8}	—	July 21, 2002	Palomar	NEAT	CYB	6.0 km	MPC · JPL
112453	2002 OC_{9}	—	July 21, 2002	Palomar	NEAT	·	3.9 km	MPC · JPL
112454	2002 OQ_{9}	—	July 21, 2002	Palomar	NEAT	·	4.5 km	MPC · JPL
112455	2002 OQ_{10}	—	July 22, 2002	Palomar	NEAT	MAS	1.3 km	MPC · JPL
112456	2002 OR_{10}	—	July 22, 2002	Palomar	NEAT	·	2.2 km	MPC · JPL
112457	2002 OT_{10}	—	July 22, 2002	Palomar	NEAT	NYS	2.3 km	MPC · JPL
112458	2002 OX_{10}	—	July 22, 2002	Palomar	NEAT	·	1.3 km	MPC · JPL
112459	2002 OG_{11}	—	July 16, 2002	Haleakala	NEAT	DOR	4.1 km	MPC · JPL
112460	2002 OW_{12}	—	July 17, 2002	Socorro	LINEAR	·	4.7 km	MPC · JPL
112461	2002 OX_{12}	—	July 17, 2002	Socorro	LINEAR	·	6.8 km	MPC · JPL
112462	2002 OJ_{13}	—	July 18, 2002	Socorro	LINEAR	·	3.0 km	MPC · JPL
112463	2002 OO_{13}	—	July 18, 2002	Socorro	LINEAR	·	5.0 km	MPC · JPL
112464	2002 OQ_{13}	—	July 18, 2002	Socorro	LINEAR	·	1.2 km	MPC · JPL
112465	2002 OR_{13}	—	July 18, 2002	Socorro	LINEAR	·	4.8 km	MPC · JPL
112466	2002 OE_{14}	—	July 18, 2002	Socorro	LINEAR	EUN	2.1 km	MPC · JPL
112467	2002 OM_{14}	—	July 18, 2002	Socorro	LINEAR	·	2.7 km	MPC · JPL
112468	2002 OF_{15}	—	July 18, 2002	Socorro	LINEAR	·	1.5 km	MPC · JPL
112469	2002 OV_{17}	—	July 18, 2002	Socorro	LINEAR	V	1.1 km	MPC · JPL
112470	2002 OK_{18}	—	July 18, 2002	Socorro	LINEAR	·	3.5 km	MPC · JPL
112471	2002 OU_{18}	—	July 18, 2002	Socorro	LINEAR	·	6.0 km	MPC · JPL
112472	2002 OC_{19}	—	July 20, 2002	Palomar	NEAT	EUN	2.4 km	MPC · JPL
112473	2002 ON_{19}	—	July 21, 2002	Palomar	NEAT	·	4.9 km	MPC · JPL
112474	2002 OB_{21}	—	July 22, 2002	Palomar	NEAT	NYS	2.7 km	MPC · JPL
112475	2002 OE_{21}	—	July 22, 2002	Palomar	NEAT	·	1.4 km	MPC · JPL
112476	2002 OG_{23}	—	July 30, 2002	Haleakala	NEAT	EUN	2.3 km	MPC · JPL
112477	2002 OU_{23}	—	July 17, 2002	Socorro	LINEAR	·	5.2 km	MPC · JPL
112478	2002 OJ_{24}	—	July 30, 2002	Haleakala	NEAT	TIR	4.3 km	MPC · JPL
112479	2002 OE_{25}	—	July 29, 2002	Palomar	S. F. Hönig	·	4.4 km	MPC · JPL
112480	2002 OF_{25}	—	July 29, 2002	Palomar	S. F. Hönig	·	2.3 km	MPC · JPL
112481	2002 OZ_{25}	—	July 30, 2002	Haleakala	NEAT	·	3.7 km	MPC · JPL
112482	2002 OJ_{26}	—	July 24, 2002	Palomar	NEAT	·	4.2 km	MPC · JPL
112483 Missjudy	2002 PA	Missjudy	August 1, 2002	Emerald Lane	L. Ball	·	2.8 km	MPC · JPL
112484	2002 PB_{1}	—	August 4, 2002	Emerald Lane	L. Ball	EOS	4.3 km	MPC · JPL
112485	2002 PJ_{1}	—	August 4, 2002	Socorro	LINEAR	·	3.0 km	MPC · JPL
112486	2002 PT_{1}	—	August 2, 2002	El Centro	Centro, El	·	1.7 km	MPC · JPL
112487	2002 PO_{2}	—	August 3, 2002	Palomar	NEAT	·	3.2 km	MPC · JPL
112488	2002 PY_{2}	—	August 3, 2002	Palomar	NEAT	·	4.3 km	MPC · JPL
112489	2002 PG_{3}	—	August 3, 2002	Palomar	NEAT	·	3.8 km	MPC · JPL
112490	2002 PB_{5}	—	August 4, 2002	Palomar	NEAT	·	4.2 km	MPC · JPL
112491	2002 PH_{5}	—	August 4, 2002	Palomar	NEAT	·	3.6 km	MPC · JPL
112492 Annacipriani	2002 PA_{6}	Annacipriani	August 2, 2002	Campo Imperatore	F. Bernardi	·	2.7 km	MPC · JPL
112493	2002 PR_{6}	—	August 6, 2002	Palomar	NEAT	·	1.7 km	MPC · JPL
112494	2002 PJ_{8}	—	August 5, 2002	Palomar	NEAT	HOF	4.1 km	MPC · JPL
112495	2002 PQ_{10}	—	August 5, 2002	Palomar	NEAT	·	1.3 km	MPC · JPL
112496	2002 PR_{10}	—	August 5, 2002	Palomar	NEAT	EUN	2.1 km	MPC · JPL
112497	2002 PU_{10}	—	August 5, 2002	Palomar	NEAT	·	5.0 km	MPC · JPL
112498	2002 PU_{11}	—	August 8, 2002	Farpoint	G. Hug	·	3.1 km	MPC · JPL
112499	2002 PC_{14}	—	August 6, 2002	Palomar	NEAT	NYS	1.3 km	MPC · JPL
112500	2002 PP_{15}	—	August 6, 2002	Palomar	NEAT	·	6.4 km	MPC · JPL

== 112501–112600 ==
back to top

Designation			Discovery			Properties		Ref
Permanent	Provisional	Named after	Date	Site	Discoverer(s)	Category	Diam.	Ref
112501	2002 PT_{15}	—	August 6, 2002	Palomar	NEAT	·	1.3 km	MPC · JPL
112502	2002 PA_{18}	—	August 6, 2002	Palomar	NEAT	·	2.1 km	MPC · JPL
112503	2002 PU_{18}	—	August 6, 2002	Palomar	NEAT	·	2.9 km	MPC · JPL
112504	2002 PT_{19}	—	August 6, 2002	Palomar	NEAT	·	1.7 km	MPC · JPL
112505	2002 PM_{21}	—	August 6, 2002	Palomar	NEAT	·	2.3 km	MPC · JPL
112506	2002 PV_{21}	—	August 6, 2002	Palomar	NEAT	·	2.5 km	MPC · JPL
112507	2002 PE_{22}	—	August 6, 2002	Palomar	NEAT	EOS	5.8 km	MPC · JPL
112508	2002 PF_{22}	—	August 6, 2002	Palomar	NEAT	·	2.3 km	MPC · JPL
112509	2002 PV_{22}	—	August 6, 2002	Palomar	NEAT	·	6.0 km	MPC · JPL
112510	2002 PO_{23}	—	August 6, 2002	Palomar	NEAT	·	1.9 km	MPC · JPL
112511	2002 PP_{24}	—	August 6, 2002	Palomar	NEAT	·	2.6 km	MPC · JPL
112512	2002 PV_{24}	—	August 6, 2002	Palomar	NEAT	·	2.2 km	MPC · JPL
112513	2002 PA_{25}	—	August 6, 2002	Palomar	NEAT	·	1.7 km	MPC · JPL
112514	2002 PA_{26}	—	August 6, 2002	Palomar	NEAT	WIT	1.6 km	MPC · JPL
112515	2002 PC_{26}	—	August 6, 2002	Palomar	NEAT	·	1.4 km	MPC · JPL
112516	2002 PG_{26}	—	August 6, 2002	Palomar	NEAT	EOS · slow	4.5 km	MPC · JPL
112517	2002 PT_{27}	—	August 6, 2002	Palomar	NEAT	·	2.0 km	MPC · JPL
112518	2002 PG_{28}	—	August 6, 2002	Palomar	NEAT	·	2.0 km	MPC · JPL
112519	2002 PL_{28}	—	August 6, 2002	Palomar	NEAT	·	3.8 km	MPC · JPL
112520	2002 PD_{29}	—	August 6, 2002	Palomar	NEAT	·	4.1 km	MPC · JPL
112521	2002 PK_{29}	—	August 6, 2002	Palomar	NEAT	·	2.3 km	MPC · JPL
112522	2002 PA_{30}	—	August 6, 2002	Palomar	NEAT	·	5.2 km	MPC · JPL
112523	2002 PF_{30}	—	August 6, 2002	Palomar	NEAT	NYS	1.7 km	MPC · JPL
112524	2002 PS_{30}	—	August 6, 2002	Palomar	NEAT	V	1.4 km	MPC · JPL
112525	2002 PQ_{31}	—	August 6, 2002	Palomar	NEAT	·	5.1 km	MPC · JPL
112526	2002 PJ_{32}	—	August 6, 2002	Palomar	NEAT	·	4.1 km	MPC · JPL
112527 Panarese	2002 PJ_{33}	Panarese	August 5, 2002	Campo Imperatore	CINEOS	·	2.5 km	MPC · JPL
112528	2002 PF_{35}	—	August 6, 2002	Palomar	NEAT	THM	3.8 km	MPC · JPL
112529	2002 PR_{35}	—	August 6, 2002	Palomar	NEAT	·	2.6 km	MPC · JPL
112530	2002 PH_{36}	—	August 6, 2002	Palomar	NEAT	NEM	3.8 km	MPC · JPL
112531	2002 PK_{36}	—	August 6, 2002	Palomar	NEAT	·	3.1 km	MPC · JPL
112532	2002 PY_{37}	—	August 5, 2002	Palomar	NEAT	·	1.9 km	MPC · JPL
112533	2002 PC_{38}	—	August 6, 2002	Palomar	NEAT	NYS	1.2 km	MPC · JPL
112534	2002 PG_{38}	—	August 6, 2002	Palomar	NEAT	·	1.4 km	MPC · JPL
112535	2002 PQ_{38}	—	August 6, 2002	Palomar	NEAT	NYS	2.3 km	MPC · JPL
112536	2002 PS_{38}	—	August 6, 2002	Palomar	NEAT	·	5.0 km	MPC · JPL
112537	2002 PK_{39}	—	August 7, 2002	Palomar	NEAT	·	2.7 km	MPC · JPL
112538	2002 PU_{39}	—	August 7, 2002	Palomar	NEAT	·	5.7 km	MPC · JPL
112539	2002 PB_{40}	—	August 8, 2002	Emerald Lane	L. Ball	·	7.1 km	MPC · JPL
112540	2002 PE_{40}	—	August 10, 2002	Reedy Creek	J. Broughton	·	2.2 km	MPC · JPL
112541	2002 PL_{40}	—	August 8, 2002	Palomar	NEAT	PHO	2.3 km	MPC · JPL
112542	2002 PN_{40}	—	August 8, 2002	Palomar	NEAT	H	1.0 km	MPC · JPL
112543	2002 PP_{41}	—	August 5, 2002	Socorro	LINEAR	·	2.0 km	MPC · JPL
112544	2002 PY_{41}	—	August 5, 2002	Socorro	LINEAR	·	1.6 km	MPC · JPL
112545	2002 PD_{42}	—	August 5, 2002	Socorro	LINEAR	·	11 km	MPC · JPL
112546	2002 PF_{42}	—	August 5, 2002	Socorro	LINEAR	·	8.7 km	MPC · JPL
112547	2002 PK_{42}	—	August 5, 2002	Socorro	LINEAR	·	3.1 km	MPC · JPL
112548	2002 PL_{42}	—	August 5, 2002	Socorro	LINEAR	·	1.3 km	MPC · JPL
112549	2002 PZ_{42}	—	August 11, 2002	Ametlla de Mar	J. Nomen	·	1.7 km	MPC · JPL
112550	2002 PY_{43}	—	August 5, 2002	Socorro	LINEAR	MAS	1.6 km	MPC · JPL
112551	2002 PA_{44}	—	August 5, 2002	Socorro	LINEAR	NYS	2.6 km	MPC · JPL
112552	2002 PB_{44}	—	August 5, 2002	Socorro	LINEAR	·	2.0 km	MPC · JPL
112553	2002 PK_{44}	—	August 5, 2002	Socorro	LINEAR	3:2 · SHU	9.1 km	MPC · JPL
112554	2002 PP_{44}	—	August 5, 2002	Socorro	LINEAR	·	4.4 km	MPC · JPL
112555	2002 PF_{45}	—	August 5, 2002	Socorro	LINEAR	·	1.5 km	MPC · JPL
112556	2002 PD_{46}	—	August 9, 2002	Socorro	LINEAR	·	4.8 km	MPC · JPL
112557	2002 PE_{46}	—	August 9, 2002	Socorro	LINEAR	·	1.8 km	MPC · JPL
112558	2002 PS_{46}	—	August 9, 2002	Socorro	LINEAR	·	2.7 km	MPC · JPL
112559	2002 PB_{47}	—	August 10, 2002	Socorro	LINEAR	EOS	3.2 km	MPC · JPL
112560	2002 PD_{47}	—	August 10, 2002	Socorro	LINEAR	·	5.6 km	MPC · JPL
112561	2002 PM_{47}	—	August 10, 2002	Socorro	LINEAR	EOS	3.6 km	MPC · JPL
112562	2002 PA_{48}	—	August 10, 2002	Socorro	LINEAR	·	5.5 km	MPC · JPL
112563	2002 PC_{48}	—	August 10, 2002	Socorro	LINEAR	·	7.0 km	MPC · JPL
112564	2002 PZ_{49}	—	August 10, 2002	Socorro	LINEAR	·	2.3 km	MPC · JPL
112565	2002 PA_{50}	—	August 10, 2002	Socorro	LINEAR	·	1.6 km	MPC · JPL
112566	2002 PE_{50}	—	August 10, 2002	Socorro	LINEAR	·	2.4 km	MPC · JPL
112567	2002 PL_{50}	—	August 10, 2002	Socorro	LINEAR	PHO	1.4 km	MPC · JPL
112568	2002 PR_{50}	—	August 10, 2002	Socorro	LINEAR	·	1.6 km	MPC · JPL
112569	2002 PS_{50}	—	August 10, 2002	Socorro	LINEAR	·	3.5 km	MPC · JPL
112570	2002 PV_{50}	—	August 10, 2002	Socorro	LINEAR	(5)	2.3 km	MPC · JPL
112571	2002 PX_{50}	—	August 10, 2002	Socorro	LINEAR	·	3.1 km	MPC · JPL
112572	2002 PO_{51}	—	August 8, 2002	Palomar	NEAT	·	4.1 km	MPC · JPL
112573	2002 PU_{51}	—	August 8, 2002	Palomar	NEAT	HYG	4.1 km	MPC · JPL
112574	2002 PW_{51}	—	August 8, 2002	Palomar	NEAT	·	2.5 km	MPC · JPL
112575	2002 PH_{52}	—	August 8, 2002	Palomar	NEAT	MAS	1.3 km	MPC · JPL
112576	2002 PY_{52}	—	August 8, 2002	Palomar	NEAT	·	2.7 km	MPC · JPL
112577	2002 PA_{53}	—	August 8, 2002	Palomar	NEAT	·	4.7 km	MPC · JPL
112578	2002 PN_{54}	—	August 5, 2002	Socorro	LINEAR	·	9.7 km	MPC · JPL
112579	2002 PT_{54}	—	August 5, 2002	Socorro	LINEAR	·	2.3 km	MPC · JPL
112580	2002 PV_{54}	—	August 9, 2002	Socorro	LINEAR	·	2.2 km	MPC · JPL
112581	2002 PY_{54}	—	August 9, 2002	Socorro	LINEAR	NYS	2.2 km	MPC · JPL
112582	2002 PZ_{54}	—	August 9, 2002	Socorro	LINEAR	·	5.6 km	MPC · JPL
112583	2002 PT_{55}	—	August 9, 2002	Socorro	LINEAR	·	1.5 km	MPC · JPL
112584	2002 PY_{55}	—	August 9, 2002	Socorro	LINEAR	NAE	6.0 km	MPC · JPL
112585	2002 PD_{56}	—	August 9, 2002	Socorro	LINEAR	·	2.0 km	MPC · JPL
112586	2002 PS_{56}	—	August 9, 2002	Socorro	LINEAR	T_{j} (2.97) · 3:2	10 km	MPC · JPL
112587	2002 PU_{56}	—	August 9, 2002	Socorro	LINEAR	·	3.5 km	MPC · JPL
112588	2002 PB_{57}	—	August 9, 2002	Socorro	LINEAR	·	4.6 km	MPC · JPL
112589	2002 PD_{57}	—	August 9, 2002	Socorro	LINEAR	(5)	2.7 km	MPC · JPL
112590	2002 PJ_{57}	—	August 9, 2002	Socorro	LINEAR	EOS	4.7 km	MPC · JPL
112591	2002 PK_{57}	—	August 9, 2002	Socorro	LINEAR	·	4.9 km	MPC · JPL
112592	2002 PP_{57}	—	August 9, 2002	Socorro	LINEAR	·	2.1 km	MPC · JPL
112593	2002 PS_{57}	—	August 9, 2002	Socorro	LINEAR	·	2.0 km	MPC · JPL
112594	2002 PQ_{58}	—	August 10, 2002	Socorro	LINEAR	MAS	1.7 km	MPC · JPL
112595	2002 PR_{58}	—	August 10, 2002	Socorro	LINEAR	·	6.7 km	MPC · JPL
112596	2002 PZ_{58}	—	August 10, 2002	Socorro	LINEAR	·	3.7 km	MPC · JPL
112597	2002 PA_{59}	—	August 10, 2002	Socorro	LINEAR	·	2.0 km	MPC · JPL
112598	2002 PE_{59}	—	August 10, 2002	Socorro	LINEAR	·	1.5 km	MPC · JPL
112599	2002 PQ_{59}	—	August 10, 2002	Socorro	LINEAR	EUN	2.8 km	MPC · JPL
112600	2002 PJ_{60}	—	August 10, 2002	Socorro	LINEAR	·	3.0 km	MPC · JPL

== 112601–112700 ==
back to top

Designation			Discovery			Properties		Ref
Permanent	Provisional	Named after	Date	Site	Discoverer(s)	Category	Diam.	Ref
112601	2002 PN_{60}	—	August 10, 2002	Socorro	LINEAR	·	2.9 km	MPC · JPL
112602	2002 PP_{60}	—	August 10, 2002	Socorro	LINEAR	ADE	4.6 km	MPC · JPL
112603	2002 PW_{60}	—	August 10, 2002	Socorro	LINEAR	·	1.5 km	MPC · JPL
112604	2002 PX_{60}	—	August 10, 2002	Socorro	LINEAR	NYS	2.5 km	MPC · JPL
112605	2002 PZ_{60}	—	August 10, 2002	Socorro	LINEAR	·	2.6 km	MPC · JPL
112606	2002 PL_{61}	—	August 11, 2002	Socorro	LINEAR	·	2.0 km	MPC · JPL
112607	2002 PT_{62}	—	August 8, 2002	Palomar	NEAT	·	3.6 km	MPC · JPL
112608	2002 PC_{63}	—	August 8, 2002	Palomar	NEAT	·	3.1 km	MPC · JPL
112609	2002 PE_{63}	—	August 8, 2002	Palomar	NEAT	·	2.1 km	MPC · JPL
112610	2002 PE_{64}	—	August 3, 2002	Palomar	NEAT	·	2.1 km	MPC · JPL
112611	2002 PQ_{64}	—	August 3, 2002	Palomar	NEAT	·	1.1 km	MPC · JPL
112612	2002 PX_{64}	—	August 4, 2002	Palomar	NEAT	·	7.0 km	MPC · JPL
112613	2002 PL_{65}	—	August 4, 2002	Palomar	NEAT	MAR	2.0 km	MPC · JPL
112614	2002 PM_{67}	—	August 6, 2002	Palomar	NEAT	·	3.7 km	MPC · JPL
112615	2002 PW_{67}	—	August 6, 2002	Palomar	NEAT	·	2.0 km	MPC · JPL
112616	2002 PD_{68}	—	August 6, 2002	Palomar	NEAT	(5)	2.4 km	MPC · JPL
112617	2002 PW_{69}	—	August 11, 2002	Socorro	LINEAR	PHO	4.9 km	MPC · JPL
112618	2002 PZ_{69}	—	August 11, 2002	Socorro	LINEAR	slow	4.5 km	MPC · JPL
112619	2002 PR_{70}	—	August 11, 2002	Socorro	LINEAR	·	5.4 km	MPC · JPL
112620	2002 PT_{70}	—	August 11, 2002	Socorro	LINEAR	·	4.6 km	MPC · JPL
112621	2002 PV_{70}	—	August 11, 2002	Socorro	LINEAR	GEF	3.3 km	MPC · JPL
112622	2002 PY_{70}	—	August 11, 2002	Socorro	LINEAR	·	6.3 km	MPC · JPL
112623	2002 PB_{71}	—	August 11, 2002	Socorro	LINEAR	·	3.8 km	MPC · JPL
112624	2002 PM_{73}	—	August 12, 2002	Socorro	LINEAR	·	2.3 km	MPC · JPL
112625	2002 PO_{73}	—	August 12, 2002	Socorro	LINEAR	·	2.3 km	MPC · JPL
112626	2002 PV_{74}	—	August 12, 2002	Socorro	LINEAR	·	9.7 km	MPC · JPL
112627	2002 PX_{75}	—	August 8, 2002	Palomar	NEAT	·	2.7 km	MPC · JPL
112628	2002 PF_{76}	—	August 8, 2002	Palomar	NEAT	·	2.7 km	MPC · JPL
112629	2002 PY_{76}	—	August 11, 2002	Palomar	NEAT	·	3.4 km	MPC · JPL
112630	2002 PA_{77}	—	August 11, 2002	Palomar	NEAT	EOS	3.3 km	MPC · JPL
112631	2002 PT_{77}	—	August 11, 2002	Haleakala	NEAT	·	3.1 km	MPC · JPL
112632	2002 PM_{78}	—	August 11, 2002	Palomar	NEAT	·	2.1 km	MPC · JPL
112633	2002 PR_{78}	—	August 11, 2002	Palomar	NEAT	·	2.2 km	MPC · JPL
112634	2002 PV_{78}	—	August 11, 2002	Palomar	NEAT	·	2.8 km	MPC · JPL
112635	2002 PZ_{78}	—	August 11, 2002	Palomar	NEAT	·	2.8 km	MPC · JPL
112636	2002 PJ_{79}	—	August 11, 2002	Palomar	NEAT	V	1.3 km	MPC · JPL
112637	2002 PK_{80}	—	August 6, 2002	Kvistaberg	Uppsala-DLR Asteroid Survey	·	4.1 km	MPC · JPL
112638	2002 PQ_{81}	—	August 9, 2002	Socorro	LINEAR	·	2.6 km	MPC · JPL
112639	2002 PT_{81}	—	August 9, 2002	Socorro	LINEAR	NYS	1.5 km	MPC · JPL
112640	2002 PW_{81}	—	August 9, 2002	Socorro	LINEAR	NYS	2.0 km	MPC · JPL
112641	2002 PC_{82}	—	August 9, 2002	Socorro	LINEAR	NYS	2.4 km	MPC · JPL
112642	2002 PE_{82}	—	August 9, 2002	Socorro	LINEAR	EUN	2.4 km	MPC · JPL
112643	2002 PP_{82}	—	August 10, 2002	Socorro	LINEAR	(5)	1.7 km	MPC · JPL
112644	2002 PV_{82}	—	August 10, 2002	Socorro	LINEAR	MAS	1.0 km	MPC · JPL
112645	2002 PX_{82}	—	August 10, 2002	Socorro	LINEAR	·	1.8 km	MPC · JPL
112646	2002 PJ_{83}	—	August 10, 2002	Socorro	LINEAR	NYS	2.6 km	MPC · JPL
112647	2002 PQ_{83}	—	August 10, 2002	Socorro	LINEAR	KOR	3.5 km	MPC · JPL
112648	2002 PR_{83}	—	August 10, 2002	Socorro	LINEAR	NYS	2.4 km	MPC · JPL
112649	2002 PA_{84}	—	August 10, 2002	Socorro	LINEAR	·	4.3 km	MPC · JPL
112650	2002 PF_{84}	—	August 10, 2002	Socorro	LINEAR	·	2.7 km	MPC · JPL
112651	2002 PK_{84}	—	August 10, 2002	Socorro	LINEAR	·	6.3 km	MPC · JPL
112652	2002 PB_{85}	—	August 10, 2002	Socorro	LINEAR	(5)	2.3 km	MPC · JPL
112653	2002 PN_{85}	—	August 10, 2002	Socorro	LINEAR	EOS	3.8 km	MPC · JPL
112654	2002 PP_{85}	—	August 10, 2002	Socorro	LINEAR	NYS	1.4 km	MPC · JPL
112655	2002 PT_{85}	—	August 12, 2002	Socorro	LINEAR	MAS	1.4 km	MPC · JPL
112656 Gines	2002 PM_{86}	Gines	August 12, 2002	Pla D'Arguines	R. Ferrando	·	2.9 km	MPC · JPL
112657	2002 PO_{86}	—	August 13, 2002	El Centro	W. K. Y. Yeung	NYS	2.6 km	MPC · JPL
112658	2002 PQ_{86}	—	August 13, 2002	Fountain Hills	C. W. Juels, P. R. Holvorcem	NYS	1.7 km	MPC · JPL
112659	2002 PS_{86}	—	August 13, 2002	Tenagra	Tenagra	EUN	2.1 km	MPC · JPL
112660 Artlucas	2002 PX_{86}	Artlucas	August 14, 2002	Reedy Creek	J. Broughton	LIX	8.0 km	MPC · JPL
112661	2002 PR_{87}	—	August 14, 2002	Socorro	LINEAR	·	1.4 km	MPC · JPL
112662	2002 PE_{88}	—	August 12, 2002	Socorro	LINEAR	NYS	2.1 km	MPC · JPL
112663	2002 PK_{88}	—	August 12, 2002	Socorro	LINEAR	·	3.5 km	MPC · JPL
112664	2002 PN_{89}	—	August 11, 2002	Socorro	LINEAR	EUN	1.9 km	MPC · JPL
112665	2002 PY_{89}	—	August 11, 2002	Socorro	LINEAR	·	3.3 km	MPC · JPL
112666	2002 PK_{91}	—	August 13, 2002	Socorro	LINEAR	·	3.3 km	MPC · JPL
112667	2002 PR_{91}	—	August 14, 2002	Socorro	LINEAR	·	3.0 km	MPC · JPL
112668	2002 PH_{92}	—	August 14, 2002	Socorro	LINEAR	HNS	2.5 km	MPC · JPL
112669	2002 PM_{92}	—	August 14, 2002	Socorro	LINEAR	·	6.6 km	MPC · JPL
112670	2002 PT_{93}	—	August 11, 2002	Haleakala	NEAT	·	1.3 km	MPC · JPL
112671	2002 PV_{94}	—	August 12, 2002	Haleakala	NEAT	·	2.2 km	MPC · JPL
112672	2002 PW_{94}	—	August 12, 2002	Haleakala	NEAT	HYG	5.8 km	MPC · JPL
112673	2002 PA_{95}	—	August 12, 2002	Haleakala	NEAT	V	1.3 km	MPC · JPL
112674	2002 PJ_{95}	—	August 13, 2002	Palomar	NEAT	·	1.4 km	MPC · JPL
112675	2002 PK_{95}	—	August 14, 2002	Socorro	LINEAR	·	4.6 km	MPC · JPL
112676	2002 PQ_{95}	—	August 14, 2002	Socorro	LINEAR	·	2.5 km	MPC · JPL
112677	2002 PW_{95}	—	August 14, 2002	Socorro	LINEAR	·	2.0 km	MPC · JPL
112678	2002 PD_{96}	—	August 14, 2002	Socorro	LINEAR	·	3.8 km	MPC · JPL
112679	2002 PL_{96}	—	August 14, 2002	Socorro	LINEAR	MIS	4.3 km	MPC · JPL
112680	2002 PS_{96}	—	August 14, 2002	Socorro	LINEAR	NYS	1.6 km	MPC · JPL
112681	2002 PX_{96}	—	August 14, 2002	Socorro	LINEAR	HYG	5.6 km	MPC · JPL
112682	2002 PX_{97}	—	August 14, 2002	Socorro	LINEAR	·	1.8 km	MPC · JPL
112683	2002 PG_{98}	—	August 14, 2002	Socorro	LINEAR	·	2.2 km	MPC · JPL
112684	2002 PX_{98}	—	August 14, 2002	Socorro	LINEAR	·	4.6 km	MPC · JPL
112685	2002 PY_{98}	—	August 14, 2002	Socorro	LINEAR	·	2.5 km	MPC · JPL
112686	2002 PD_{99}	—	August 14, 2002	Socorro	LINEAR	·	1.8 km	MPC · JPL
112687	2002 PF_{99}	—	August 14, 2002	Socorro	LINEAR	·	2.4 km	MPC · JPL
112688	2002 PH_{99}	—	August 14, 2002	Socorro	LINEAR	·	2.1 km	MPC · JPL
112689	2002 PR_{99}	—	August 14, 2002	Socorro	LINEAR	·	2.6 km	MPC · JPL
112690	2002 PB_{100}	—	August 14, 2002	Socorro	LINEAR	·	7.8 km	MPC · JPL
112691	2002 PN_{100}	—	August 14, 2002	Socorro	LINEAR	·	5.9 km	MPC · JPL
112692	2002 PB_{101}	—	August 11, 2002	Palomar	NEAT	·	1.4 km	MPC · JPL
112693	2002 PF_{101}	—	August 12, 2002	Socorro	LINEAR	·	1.4 km	MPC · JPL
112694	2002 PO_{101}	—	August 12, 2002	Socorro	LINEAR	T_{j} (2.95) · 3:2	8.1 km	MPC · JPL
112695	2002 PY_{101}	—	August 12, 2002	Socorro	LINEAR	·	3.2 km	MPC · JPL
112696	2002 PJ_{102}	—	August 12, 2002	Socorro	LINEAR	·	2.1 km	MPC · JPL
112697	2002 PC_{103}	—	August 12, 2002	Socorro	LINEAR	·	1.7 km	MPC · JPL
112698	2002 PP_{103}	—	August 12, 2002	Socorro	LINEAR	EOS	3.8 km	MPC · JPL
112699	2002 PH_{104}	—	August 12, 2002	Socorro	LINEAR	·	5.2 km	MPC · JPL
112700	2002 PY_{104}	—	August 12, 2002	Socorro	LINEAR	·	3.8 km	MPC · JPL

== 112701–112800 ==
back to top

Designation			Discovery			Properties		Ref
Permanent	Provisional	Named after	Date	Site	Discoverer(s)	Category	Diam.	Ref
112701	2002 PX_{105}	—	August 12, 2002	Socorro	LINEAR	EOS	3.5 km	MPC · JPL
112702	2002 PJ_{106}	—	August 12, 2002	Socorro	LINEAR	·	1.0 km	MPC · JPL
112703	2002 PS_{106}	—	August 12, 2002	Socorro	LINEAR	EOS ·	6.2 km	MPC · JPL
112704	2002 PZ_{106}	—	August 12, 2002	Socorro	LINEAR	·	2.2 km	MPC · JPL
112705	2002 PX_{107}	—	August 13, 2002	Socorro	LINEAR	·	1.3 km	MPC · JPL
112706	2002 PM_{108}	—	August 13, 2002	Socorro	LINEAR	·	1.5 km	MPC · JPL
112707	2002 PD_{109}	—	August 13, 2002	Socorro	LINEAR	·	3.9 km	MPC · JPL
112708	2002 PG_{109}	—	August 13, 2002	Socorro	LINEAR	EOS	3.6 km	MPC · JPL
112709	2002 PW_{109}	—	August 13, 2002	Anderson Mesa	LONEOS	·	1.6 km	MPC · JPL
112710	2002 PS_{110}	—	August 13, 2002	Socorro	LINEAR	·	2.1 km	MPC · JPL
112711	2002 PT_{110}	—	August 13, 2002	Socorro	LINEAR	·	4.9 km	MPC · JPL
112712	2002 PO_{111}	—	August 14, 2002	Socorro	LINEAR	·	1.3 km	MPC · JPL
112713	2002 PU_{111}	—	August 14, 2002	Socorro	LINEAR	·	4.0 km	MPC · JPL
112714	2002 PX_{111}	—	August 14, 2002	Socorro	LINEAR	·	2.4 km	MPC · JPL
112715	2002 PW_{113}	—	August 12, 2002	Socorro	LINEAR	·	3.6 km	MPC · JPL
112716	2002 PN_{115}	—	August 12, 2002	Haleakala	NEAT	·	4.7 km	MPC · JPL
112717	2002 PX_{115}	—	August 13, 2002	Socorro	LINEAR	·	5.6 km	MPC · JPL
112718	2002 PK_{116}	—	August 14, 2002	Socorro	LINEAR	·	1.8 km	MPC · JPL
112719	2002 PO_{116}	—	August 14, 2002	Anderson Mesa	LONEOS	·	3.2 km	MPC · JPL
112720	2002 PY_{116}	—	August 14, 2002	Anderson Mesa	LONEOS	·	6.8 km	MPC · JPL
112721	2002 PA_{118}	—	August 13, 2002	Palomar	NEAT	·	2.5 km	MPC · JPL
112722	2002 PB_{118}	—	August 13, 2002	Anderson Mesa	LONEOS	·	3.7 km	MPC · JPL
112723	2002 PC_{119}	—	August 13, 2002	Anderson Mesa	LONEOS	·	1.7 km	MPC · JPL
112724	2002 PE_{119}	—	August 13, 2002	Anderson Mesa	LONEOS	·	5.2 km	MPC · JPL
112725	2002 PO_{119}	—	August 13, 2002	Anderson Mesa	LONEOS	·	6.8 km	MPC · JPL
112726	2002 PN_{120}	—	August 13, 2002	Anderson Mesa	LONEOS	HYG	6.2 km	MPC · JPL
112727	2002 PY_{120}	—	August 13, 2002	Anderson Mesa	LONEOS	(43176)	6.4 km	MPC · JPL
112728	2002 PQ_{121}	—	August 13, 2002	Anderson Mesa	LONEOS	·	4.6 km	MPC · JPL
112729	2002 PP_{122}	—	August 14, 2002	Socorro	LINEAR	(5)	2.0 km	MPC · JPL
112730	2002 PU_{124}	—	August 13, 2002	Anderson Mesa	LONEOS	EOS	5.5 km	MPC · JPL
112731	2002 PW_{125}	—	August 14, 2002	Socorro	LINEAR	·	2.2 km	MPC · JPL
112732	2002 PH_{126}	—	August 14, 2002	Socorro	LINEAR	·	4.6 km	MPC · JPL
112733	2002 PP_{126}	—	August 14, 2002	Socorro	LINEAR	·	1.9 km	MPC · JPL
112734	2002 PX_{126}	—	August 14, 2002	Socorro	LINEAR	MAS	1.4 km	MPC · JPL
112735	2002 PM_{127}	—	August 14, 2002	Socorro	LINEAR	DOR	4.8 km	MPC · JPL
112736	2002 PX_{127}	—	August 14, 2002	Socorro	LINEAR	·	1.5 km	MPC · JPL
112737	2002 PE_{128}	—	August 14, 2002	Socorro	LINEAR	·	2.9 km	MPC · JPL
112738	2002 PK_{128}	—	August 14, 2002	Socorro	LINEAR	·	3.1 km	MPC · JPL
112739	2002 PX_{128}	—	August 14, 2002	Socorro	LINEAR	·	6.5 km	MPC · JPL
112740	2002 PA_{129}	—	August 14, 2002	Socorro	LINEAR	·	9.2 km	MPC · JPL
112741	2002 PK_{129}	—	August 15, 2002	Palomar	NEAT	·	3.3 km	MPC · JPL
112742	2002 PM_{130}	—	August 13, 2002	Socorro	LINEAR	·	4.5 km	MPC · JPL
112743	2002 PR_{130}	—	August 13, 2002	Anderson Mesa	LONEOS	·	3.6 km	MPC · JPL
112744	2002 PG_{132}	—	August 14, 2002	Socorro	LINEAR	MAS	2.0 km	MPC · JPL
112745	2002 PK_{132}	—	August 14, 2002	Socorro	LINEAR	·	4.7 km	MPC · JPL
112746	2002 PR_{132}	—	August 14, 2002	Socorro	LINEAR	NYS	2.4 km	MPC · JPL
112747	2002 PU_{132}	—	August 14, 2002	Socorro	LINEAR	VER	7.2 km	MPC · JPL
112748	2002 PV_{132}	—	August 14, 2002	Socorro	LINEAR	·	5.9 km	MPC · JPL
112749	2002 PV_{133}	—	August 14, 2002	Socorro	LINEAR	EOS	3.8 km	MPC · JPL
112750	2002 PV_{134}	—	August 14, 2002	Socorro	LINEAR	·	2.2 km	MPC · JPL
112751	2002 PW_{134}	—	August 14, 2002	Socorro	LINEAR	·	1.8 km	MPC · JPL
112752	2002 PA_{135}	—	August 14, 2002	Socorro	LINEAR	·	2.4 km	MPC · JPL
112753	2002 PC_{135}	—	August 14, 2002	Socorro	LINEAR	·	1.2 km	MPC · JPL
112754	2002 PD_{135}	—	August 14, 2002	Socorro	LINEAR	NYS	1.8 km	MPC · JPL
112755	2002 PV_{135}	—	August 14, 2002	Socorro	LINEAR	·	3.7 km	MPC · JPL
112756	2002 PB_{136}	—	August 14, 2002	Socorro	LINEAR	KOR	2.4 km	MPC · JPL
112757	2002 PF_{136}	—	August 14, 2002	Socorro	LINEAR	EOS	3.9 km	MPC · JPL
112758	2002 PN_{136}	—	August 14, 2002	Socorro	LINEAR	(5)	2.0 km	MPC · JPL
112759	2002 PX_{137}	—	August 15, 2002	Socorro	LINEAR	·	2.3 km	MPC · JPL
112760	2002 PD_{140}	—	August 13, 2002	Bergisch Gladbach	W. Bickel	·	3.4 km	MPC · JPL
112761	2002 PF_{140}	—	August 14, 2002	Bergisch Gladbach	W. Bickel	·	1.5 km	MPC · JPL
112762	2002 PN_{140}	—	August 15, 2002	Bergisch Gladbach	W. Bickel	·	1.4 km	MPC · JPL
112763	2002 PE_{141}	—	August 1, 2002	Socorro	LINEAR	·	2.9 km	MPC · JPL
112764	2002 PA_{154}	—	August 8, 2002	Palomar	NEAT	EUP	6.4 km	MPC · JPL
112765	2002 PR_{155}	—	August 8, 2002	Palomar	S. F. Hönig	·	2.0 km	MPC · JPL
112766	2002 PJ_{156}	—	August 8, 2002	Palomar	S. F. Hönig	NEM	5.6 km	MPC · JPL
112767	2002 PO_{156}	—	August 8, 2002	Palomar	S. F. Hönig	MAS	1.2 km	MPC · JPL
112768	2002 PS_{156}	—	August 8, 2002	Palomar	S. F. Hönig	·	3.9 km	MPC · JPL
112769	2002 PU_{156}	—	August 8, 2002	Palomar	S. F. Hönig	·	3.1 km	MPC · JPL
112770	2002 PK_{157}	—	August 8, 2002	Palomar	S. F. Hönig	·	3.8 km	MPC · JPL
112771	2002 PU_{157}	—	August 8, 2002	Palomar	S. F. Hönig	·	4.0 km	MPC · JPL
112772	2002 PZ_{157}	—	August 8, 2002	Palomar	S. F. Hönig	·	1.5 km	MPC · JPL
112773	2002 PD_{158}	—	August 8, 2002	Palomar	S. F. Hönig	·	3.2 km	MPC · JPL
112774	2002 PQ_{158}	—	August 8, 2002	Palomar	S. F. Hönig	·	3.3 km	MPC · JPL
112775	2002 PR_{158}	—	August 8, 2002	Palomar	S. F. Hönig	·	1.2 km	MPC · JPL
112776	2002 PA_{159}	—	August 8, 2002	Palomar	S. F. Hönig	KOR	2.0 km	MPC · JPL
112777	2002 PD_{159}	—	August 8, 2002	Palomar	S. F. Hönig	PAD	4.6 km	MPC · JPL
112778	2002 PJ_{159}	—	August 8, 2002	Palomar	S. F. Hönig	·	2.7 km	MPC · JPL
112779	2002 PK_{160}	—	August 8, 2002	Palomar	S. F. Hönig	KOR	2.2 km	MPC · JPL
112780	2002 PO_{160}	—	August 8, 2002	Palomar	S. F. Hönig	·	2.2 km	MPC · JPL
112781	2002 PR_{160}	—	August 8, 2002	Palomar	S. F. Hönig	KOR	2.5 km	MPC · JPL
112782	2002 PU_{160}	—	August 8, 2002	Palomar	S. F. Hönig	NEM	4.1 km	MPC · JPL
112783	2002 PC_{161}	—	August 8, 2002	Palomar	S. F. Hönig	EOS	2.6 km	MPC · JPL
112784	2002 PD_{161}	—	August 8, 2002	Palomar	S. F. Hönig	·	2.5 km	MPC · JPL
112785	2002 PK_{161}	—	August 8, 2002	Palomar	S. F. Hönig	KOR	2.9 km	MPC · JPL
112786	2002 PM_{161}	—	August 8, 2002	Palomar	S. F. Hönig	(17392)	2.6 km	MPC · JPL
112787	2002 PH_{162}	—	August 8, 2002	Palomar	S. F. Hönig	·	5.4 km	MPC · JPL
112788	2002 PC_{163}	—	August 8, 2002	Palomar	S. F. Hönig	·	3.9 km	MPC · JPL
112789	2002 PR_{163}	—	August 8, 2002	Palomar	S. F. Hönig	MAS	1.5 km	MPC · JPL
112790	2002 PC_{164}	—	August 8, 2002	Palomar	S. F. Hönig	NYS	2.0 km	MPC · JPL
112791	2002 PE_{164}	—	August 8, 2002	Palomar	S. F. Hönig	·	3.6 km	MPC · JPL
112792	2002 PF_{164}	—	August 8, 2002	Palomar	S. F. Hönig	·	1.8 km	MPC · JPL
112793	2002 PH_{164}	—	August 8, 2002	Palomar	S. F. Hönig	·	3.0 km	MPC · JPL
112794	2002 PV_{164}	—	August 8, 2002	Palomar	S. F. Hönig	·	2.2 km	MPC · JPL
112795	2002 PC_{165}	—	August 8, 2002	Palomar	S. F. Hönig	HYG	3.5 km	MPC · JPL
112796	2002 PE_{165}	—	August 8, 2002	Palomar	S. F. Hönig	·	3.8 km	MPC · JPL
112797 Grantjudy	2002 PH_{165}	Grantjudy	August 9, 2002	Haleakala	Lowe, A.	·	1.1 km	MPC · JPL
112798 Kelindsey	2002 PR_{165}	Kelindsey	August 8, 2002	Palomar	Lowe, A.	·	2.5 km	MPC · JPL
112799	2002 PS_{165}	—	August 8, 2002	Palomar	Lowe, A.	·	2.6 km	MPC · JPL
112800	2002 PD_{168}	—	August 11, 2002	Palomar	NEAT	·	4.2 km	MPC · JPL

== 112801–112900 ==
back to top

Designation			Discovery			Properties		Ref
Permanent	Provisional	Named after	Date	Site	Discoverer(s)	Category	Diam.	Ref
112801	2002 PS_{168}	—	August 8, 2002	Palomar	NEAT	KOR	2.6 km	MPC · JPL
112802	2002 PU_{168}	—	August 8, 2002	Palomar	NEAT	·	1.7 km	MPC · JPL
112803	2002 QG	—	August 16, 2002	Socorro	LINEAR	·	1.2 km	MPC · JPL
112804	2002 QR	—	August 16, 2002	Anderson Mesa	LONEOS	·	9.6 km	MPC · JPL
112805	2002 QL_{2}	—	August 16, 2002	Haleakala	NEAT	MAR	2.1 km	MPC · JPL
112806	2002 QT_{2}	—	August 16, 2002	Haleakala	NEAT	·	1.9 km	MPC · JPL
112807	2002 QV_{2}	—	August 16, 2002	Haleakala	NEAT	·	6.5 km	MPC · JPL
112808	2002 QW_{2}	—	August 16, 2002	Haleakala	NEAT	HOF	6.2 km	MPC · JPL
112809	2002 QA_{3}	—	August 16, 2002	Palomar	NEAT	HOF	6.2 km	MPC · JPL
112810	2002 QB_{3}	—	August 16, 2002	Palomar	NEAT	EOS	3.6 km	MPC · JPL
112811	2002 QD_{3}	—	August 16, 2002	Palomar	NEAT	·	3.7 km	MPC · JPL
112812	2002 QG_{3}	—	August 16, 2002	Palomar	NEAT	·	3.9 km	MPC · JPL
112813	2002 QT_{3}	—	August 16, 2002	Palomar	NEAT	·	2.1 km	MPC · JPL
112814	2002 QC_{5}	—	August 16, 2002	Palomar	NEAT	·	7.4 km	MPC · JPL
112815	2002 QF_{5}	—	August 16, 2002	Palomar	NEAT	·	3.9 km	MPC · JPL
112816	2002 QO_{5}	—	August 16, 2002	Palomar	NEAT	·	4.8 km	MPC · JPL
112817	2002 QR_{5}	—	August 16, 2002	Bergisch Gladbach	W. Bickel	·	5.3 km	MPC · JPL
112818	2002 QT_{5}	—	August 16, 2002	Anderson Mesa	LONEOS	·	7.7 km	MPC · JPL
112819	2002 QM_{7}	—	August 16, 2002	Palomar	NEAT	HYG	8.4 km	MPC · JPL
112820	2002 QQ_{7}	—	August 16, 2002	Palomar	NEAT	·	3.7 km	MPC · JPL
112821	2002 QX_{7}	—	August 19, 2002	Palomar	NEAT	·	2.3 km	MPC · JPL
112822	2002 QG_{8}	—	August 19, 2002	Palomar	NEAT	3:2	10 km	MPC · JPL
112823	2002 QR_{8}	—	August 19, 2002	Palomar	NEAT	BRG	2.9 km	MPC · JPL
112824	2002 QA_{9}	—	August 19, 2002	Palomar	NEAT	V	1.2 km	MPC · JPL
112825	2002 QN_{9}	—	August 19, 2002	Palomar	NEAT	V	1.0 km	MPC · JPL
112826	2002 QQ_{9}	—	August 20, 2002	Palomar	NEAT	·	4.3 km	MPC · JPL
112827	2002 QS_{9}	—	August 20, 2002	Palomar	NEAT	·	4.3 km	MPC · JPL
112828	2002 QE_{10}	—	August 24, 2002	Palomar	NEAT	·	1.8 km	MPC · JPL
112829	2002 QF_{11}	—	August 26, 2002	Palomar	NEAT	·	1.8 km	MPC · JPL
112830	2002 QP_{12}	—	August 26, 2002	Palomar	NEAT	·	3.1 km	MPC · JPL
112831	2002 QJ_{14}	—	August 26, 2002	Palomar	NEAT	EUN	2.3 km	MPC · JPL
112832	2002 QX_{14}	—	August 26, 2002	Palomar	NEAT	·	2.2 km	MPC · JPL
112833	2002 QH_{15}	—	August 26, 2002	Palomar	NEAT	·	2.6 km	MPC · JPL
112834	2002 QQ_{16}	—	August 26, 2002	Palomar	NEAT	·	2.6 km	MPC · JPL
112835	2002 QL_{17}	—	August 28, 2002	Bagnall Beach	Crawford, G.	BRA	2.5 km	MPC · JPL
112836	2002 QM_{17}	—	August 27, 2002	Palomar	NEAT	·	2.6 km	MPC · JPL
112837	2002 QS_{17}	—	August 27, 2002	Palomar	NEAT	·	1.6 km	MPC · JPL
112838	2002 QZ_{17}	—	August 28, 2002	Palomar	NEAT	THM	4.4 km	MPC · JPL
112839	2002 QJ_{18}	—	August 28, 2002	Palomar	NEAT	·	4.7 km	MPC · JPL
112840	2002 QN_{18}	—	August 26, 2002	Palomar	NEAT	·	2.2 km	MPC · JPL
112841	2002 QQ_{19}	—	August 27, 2002	Palomar	NEAT	·	2.2 km	MPC · JPL
112842	2002 QU_{19}	—	August 28, 2002	Palomar	NEAT	LUT	6.6 km	MPC · JPL
112843	2002 QM_{20}	—	August 28, 2002	Palomar	NEAT	·	2.3 km	MPC · JPL
112844	2002 QW_{20}	—	August 28, 2002	Palomar	NEAT	·	4.9 km	MPC · JPL
112845	2002 QX_{20}	—	August 28, 2002	Palomar	NEAT	·	2.6 km	MPC · JPL
112846	2002 QZ_{20}	—	August 28, 2002	Palomar	NEAT	·	1.2 km	MPC · JPL
112847	2002 QA_{21}	—	August 28, 2002	Palomar	NEAT	·	3.2 km	MPC · JPL
112848	2002 QE_{21}	—	August 28, 2002	Palomar	NEAT	NYS	1.7 km	MPC · JPL
112849	2002 QH_{21}	—	August 28, 2002	Palomar	NEAT	·	2.1 km	MPC · JPL
112850	2002 QX_{22}	—	August 27, 2002	Palomar	NEAT	·	2.5 km	MPC · JPL
112851	2002 QM_{23}	—	August 27, 2002	Palomar	NEAT	·	1.8 km	MPC · JPL
112852	2002 QT_{24}	—	August 27, 2002	Socorro	LINEAR	PHO	2.5 km	MPC · JPL
112853	2002 QM_{25}	—	August 29, 2002	Kitt Peak	Spacewatch	KOR	2.4 km	MPC · JPL
112854	2002 QP_{27}	—	August 28, 2002	Palomar	NEAT	·	3.6 km	MPC · JPL
112855	2002 QJ_{28}	—	August 28, 2002	Palomar	NEAT	·	2.7 km	MPC · JPL
112856	2002 QS_{29}	—	August 29, 2002	Palomar	NEAT	·	1.7 km	MPC · JPL
112857	2002 QX_{29}	—	August 29, 2002	Palomar	NEAT	KOR	2.6 km	MPC · JPL
112858	2002 QY_{29}	—	August 29, 2002	Palomar	NEAT	·	5.0 km	MPC · JPL
112859	2002 QZ_{29}	—	August 29, 2002	Palomar	NEAT	·	3.8 km	MPC · JPL
112860	2002 QF_{30}	—	August 29, 2002	Palomar	NEAT	·	3.3 km	MPC · JPL
112861	2002 QE_{31}	—	August 29, 2002	Palomar	NEAT	·	2.3 km	MPC · JPL
112862	2002 QG_{31}	—	August 29, 2002	Palomar	NEAT	·	3.8 km	MPC · JPL
112863	2002 QM_{31}	—	August 29, 2002	Palomar	NEAT	EOS	3.3 km	MPC · JPL
112864	2002 QZ_{32}	—	August 29, 2002	Palomar	NEAT	·	2.1 km	MPC · JPL
112865	2002 QE_{33}	—	August 29, 2002	Palomar	NEAT	·	3.5 km	MPC · JPL
112866	2002 QM_{33}	—	August 29, 2002	Palomar	NEAT	·	4.2 km	MPC · JPL
112867	2002 QQ_{34}	—	August 29, 2002	Palomar	NEAT	·	1.8 km	MPC · JPL
112868	2002 QT_{34}	—	August 29, 2002	Palomar	NEAT	·	3.2 km	MPC · JPL
112869	2002 QH_{35}	—	August 29, 2002	Palomar	NEAT	·	3.6 km	MPC · JPL
112870	2002 QC_{36}	—	August 29, 2002	Palomar	NEAT	·	3.1 km	MPC · JPL
112871	2002 QT_{36}	—	August 29, 2002	Palomar	NEAT	·	6.3 km	MPC · JPL
112872	2002 QG_{37}	—	August 30, 2002	Kitt Peak	Spacewatch	·	3.9 km	MPC · JPL
112873	2002 QQ_{38}	—	August 30, 2002	Kitt Peak	Spacewatch	·	2.6 km	MPC · JPL
112874	2002 QX_{38}	—	August 30, 2002	Kitt Peak	Spacewatch	PAD	4.2 km	MPC · JPL
112875	2002 QM_{40}	—	August 30, 2002	Palomar	NEAT	·	1.5 km	MPC · JPL
112876	2002 QP_{40}	—	August 30, 2002	Socorro	LINEAR	(14916)	4.7 km	MPC · JPL
112877	2002 QR_{40}	—	August 28, 2002	Palomar	NEAT	·	2.0 km	MPC · JPL
112878	2002 QC_{41}	—	August 29, 2002	Palomar	NEAT	·	1.8 km	MPC · JPL
112879	2002 QG_{41}	—	August 29, 2002	Palomar	NEAT	·	1.9 km	MPC · JPL
112880	2002 QC_{42}	—	August 29, 2002	Palomar	NEAT	·	4.5 km	MPC · JPL
112881	2002 QV_{42}	—	August 30, 2002	Palomar	NEAT	·	4.6 km	MPC · JPL
112882	2002 QC_{43}	—	August 30, 2002	Palomar	NEAT	NYS	2.1 km	MPC · JPL
112883	2002 QJ_{43}	—	August 30, 2002	Palomar	NEAT	·	2.3 km	MPC · JPL
112884	2002 QL_{43}	—	August 30, 2002	Palomar	NEAT	·	3.9 km	MPC · JPL
112885	2002 QP_{43}	—	August 30, 2002	Palomar	NEAT	NYS	1.9 km	MPC · JPL
112886	2002 QU_{43}	—	August 30, 2002	Palomar	NEAT	URS	8.5 km	MPC · JPL
112887	2002 QQ_{44}	—	August 30, 2002	Kitt Peak	Spacewatch	EOS	4.0 km	MPC · JPL
112888	2002 QR_{44}	—	August 30, 2002	Kitt Peak	Spacewatch	KOR	3.3 km	MPC · JPL
112889	2002 QV_{45}	—	August 31, 2002	Kitt Peak	Spacewatch	·	1.9 km	MPC · JPL
112890	2002 QO_{46}	—	August 30, 2002	Palomar	NEAT	EOS	3.9 km	MPC · JPL
112891	2002 QG_{47}	—	August 30, 2002	Anderson Mesa	LONEOS	·	1.6 km	MPC · JPL
112892	2002 QS_{47}	—	August 30, 2002	Socorro	LINEAR	·	3.3 km	MPC · JPL
112893	2002 QF_{48}	—	August 17, 2002	Palomar	S. F. Hönig	·	2.4 km	MPC · JPL
112894	2002 QM_{48}	—	August 29, 2002	Palomar	S. F. Hönig	·	1.9 km	MPC · JPL
112895	2002 QQ_{48}	—	August 18, 2002	Palomar	S. F. Hönig	KOR	2.5 km	MPC · JPL
112896	2002 QS_{48}	—	August 18, 2002	Palomar	S. F. Hönig	·	1.5 km	MPC · JPL
112897	2002 QD_{49}	—	August 29, 2002	Palomar	R. Matson	·	5.7 km	MPC · JPL
112898	2002 QX_{49}	—	August 29, 2002	Palomar	R. Matson	·	3.7 km	MPC · JPL
112899	2002 QL_{50}	—	August 16, 2002	Palomar	Lowe, A.	(5)	1.6 km	MPC · JPL
112900 Tonyhoffman	2002 QS_{50}	Tonyhoffman	August 20, 2002	Palomar	R. Matson	·	2.3 km	MPC · JPL

== 112901–113000 ==
back to top

Designation			Discovery			Properties		Ref
Permanent	Provisional	Named after	Date	Site	Discoverer(s)	Category	Diam.	Ref
112901	2002 QK_{51}	—	August 16, 2002	Palomar	Lowe, A.	·	2.0 km	MPC · JPL
112902	2002 QO_{52}	—	August 29, 2002	Palomar	S. F. Hönig	·	2.6 km	MPC · JPL
112903	2002 QB_{53}	—	August 29, 2002	Palomar	S. F. Hönig	KOR	1.9 km	MPC · JPL
112904	2002 QS_{53}	—	August 29, 2002	Palomar	S. F. Hönig	·	2.0 km	MPC · JPL
112905	2002 QD_{54}	—	August 29, 2002	Palomar	S. F. Hönig	V	900 m	MPC · JPL
112906	2002 QP_{54}	—	August 29, 2002	Palomar	S. F. Hönig	·	2.1 km	MPC · JPL
112907	2002 QR_{54}	—	August 17, 2002	Palomar	Lowe, A.	·	2.2 km	MPC · JPL
112908	2002 QX_{54}	—	August 29, 2002	Palomar	S. F. Hönig	·	2.4 km	MPC · JPL
112909	2002 QL_{56}	—	August 29, 2002	Palomar	S. F. Hönig	·	1.9 km	MPC · JPL
112910	2002 QY_{56}	—	August 29, 2002	Palomar	S. F. Hönig	·	4.8 km	MPC · JPL
112911	2002 QB_{57}	—	August 17, 2002	Palomar	Lowe, A.	·	2.7 km	MPC · JPL
112912	2002 QF_{58}	—	August 29, 2002	Palomar	S. F. Hönig	·	2.4 km	MPC · JPL
112913	2002 QP_{58}	—	August 18, 2002	Palomar	S. F. Hönig	·	2.1 km	MPC · JPL
112914	2002 QA_{59}	—	August 17, 2002	Palomar	NEAT	·	4.9 km	MPC · JPL
112915	2002 QC_{60}	—	August 16, 2002	Palomar	NEAT	ADE	5.1 km	MPC · JPL
112916	2002 QM_{60}	—	August 17, 2002	Palomar	NEAT	AGN	2.1 km	MPC · JPL
112917	2002 QQ_{61}	—	August 27, 2002	Palomar	NEAT	·	2.9 km	MPC · JPL
112918	2002 QD_{62}	—	August 17, 2002	Palomar	NEAT	·	3.4 km	MPC · JPL
112919	2002 QQ_{62}	—	August 28, 2002	Palomar	NEAT	·	2.0 km	MPC · JPL
112920	2002 QR_{62}	—	August 28, 2002	Palomar	NEAT	·	1.3 km	MPC · JPL
112921	2002 QC_{63}	—	August 17, 2002	Palomar	NEAT	NYS	1.7 km	MPC · JPL
112922	2002 QN_{63}	—	August 30, 2002	Palomar	NEAT	KOR	2.1 km	MPC · JPL
112923	2002 QA_{65}	—	August 27, 2002	Palomar	NEAT	·	4.7 km	MPC · JPL
112924	2002 QD_{65}	—	August 30, 2002	Palomar	NEAT	·	3.3 km	MPC · JPL
112925	2002 QE_{65}	—	August 27, 2002	Palomar	NEAT	·	2.9 km	MPC · JPL
112926	2002 QJ_{66}	—	August 18, 2002	Palomar	NEAT	(12739)	2.4 km	MPC · JPL
112927	2002 QU_{66}	—	August 18, 2002	Palomar	NEAT	NYS	1.4 km	MPC · JPL
112928	2002 QZ_{66}	—	August 30, 2002	Palomar	NEAT	·	3.5 km	MPC · JPL
112929	2002 QN_{67}	—	August 16, 2002	Haleakala	NEAT	·	4.9 km	MPC · JPL
112930	2002 QW_{67}	—	August 17, 2002	Palomar	NEAT	·	3.6 km	MPC · JPL
112931	2002 QW_{68}	—	August 29, 2002	Palomar	NEAT	·	3.3 km	MPC · JPL
112932	2002 RQ_{2}	—	September 4, 2002	Anderson Mesa	LONEOS	THM	4.4 km	MPC · JPL
112933	2002 RT_{2}	—	September 4, 2002	Anderson Mesa	LONEOS	·	4.0 km	MPC · JPL
112934	2002 RG_{3}	—	September 4, 2002	Anderson Mesa	LONEOS	·	6.1 km	MPC · JPL
112935	2002 RH_{3}	—	September 4, 2002	Anderson Mesa	LONEOS	NYS	2.8 km	MPC · JPL
112936	2002 RO_{3}	—	September 1, 2002	Palomar	NEAT	·	1.8 km	MPC · JPL
112937	2002 RU_{3}	—	September 1, 2002	Haleakala	NEAT	·	2.2 km	MPC · JPL
112938	2002 RK_{4}	—	September 3, 2002	Palomar	NEAT	EUN	1.7 km	MPC · JPL
112939	2002 RP_{4}	—	September 3, 2002	Palomar	NEAT	·	2.8 km	MPC · JPL
112940	2002 RK_{5}	—	September 3, 2002	Palomar	NEAT	·	2.2 km	MPC · JPL
112941	2002 RD_{6}	—	September 1, 2002	Haleakala	NEAT	·	4.5 km	MPC · JPL
112942	2002 RN_{6}	—	September 1, 2002	Haleakala	NEAT	·	4.4 km	MPC · JPL
112943	2002 RU_{6}	—	September 1, 2002	Haleakala	NEAT	·	1.9 km	MPC · JPL
112944	2002 RV_{6}	—	September 1, 2002	Haleakala	NEAT	·	3.8 km	MPC · JPL
112945	2002 RA_{7}	—	September 2, 2002	Kitt Peak	Spacewatch	·	1.7 km	MPC · JPL
112946	2002 RZ_{7}	—	September 3, 2002	Haleakala	NEAT	·	2.6 km	MPC · JPL
112947 Marinascatena	2002 RQ_{8}	Marinascatena	September 3, 2002	Campo Imperatore	F. Bernardi	·	1.5 km	MPC · JPL
112948	2002 RX_{8}	—	September 4, 2002	Palomar	NEAT	·	2.4 km	MPC · JPL
112949	2002 RG_{9}	—	September 4, 2002	Palomar	NEAT	(5)	1.7 km	MPC · JPL
112950	2002 RK_{9}	—	September 4, 2002	Palomar	NEAT	·	7.2 km	MPC · JPL
112951	2002 RZ_{9}	—	September 4, 2002	Palomar	NEAT	·	2.2 km	MPC · JPL
112952	2002 RJ_{10}	—	September 4, 2002	Palomar	NEAT	·	1.7 km	MPC · JPL
112953	2002 RF_{11}	—	September 4, 2002	Palomar	NEAT	·	4.5 km	MPC · JPL
112954	2002 RM_{12}	—	September 4, 2002	Anderson Mesa	LONEOS	·	6.3 km	MPC · JPL
112955	2002 RS_{12}	—	September 4, 2002	Anderson Mesa	LONEOS	GEF	2.0 km	MPC · JPL
112956	2002 RH_{13}	—	September 4, 2002	Anderson Mesa	LONEOS	·	3.0 km	MPC · JPL
112957	2002 RP_{13}	—	September 4, 2002	Anderson Mesa	LONEOS	·	6.7 km	MPC · JPL
112958	2002 RX_{13}	—	September 4, 2002	Anderson Mesa	LONEOS	·	2.1 km	MPC · JPL
112959	2002 RZ_{13}	—	September 4, 2002	Anderson Mesa	LONEOS	EOS ·	6.4 km	MPC · JPL
112960	2002 RB_{14}	—	September 4, 2002	Anderson Mesa	LONEOS	·	3.1 km	MPC · JPL
112961	2002 RE_{14}	—	September 4, 2002	Anderson Mesa	LONEOS	·	2.8 km	MPC · JPL
112962	2002 RV_{14}	—	September 4, 2002	Anderson Mesa	LONEOS	NYS	2.4 km	MPC · JPL
112963	2002 RV_{15}	—	September 4, 2002	Anderson Mesa	LONEOS	·	2.1 km	MPC · JPL
112964	2002 RW_{15}	—	September 4, 2002	Anderson Mesa	LONEOS	·	1.3 km	MPC · JPL
112965	2002 RU_{16}	—	September 4, 2002	Anderson Mesa	LONEOS	·	1.7 km	MPC · JPL
112966	2002 RA_{19}	—	September 4, 2002	Anderson Mesa	LONEOS	·	6.0 km	MPC · JPL
112967	2002 RF_{19}	—	September 4, 2002	Anderson Mesa	LONEOS	·	4.7 km	MPC · JPL
112968	2002 RH_{19}	—	September 4, 2002	Anderson Mesa	LONEOS	KOR	3.1 km	MPC · JPL
112969	2002 RL_{19}	—	September 4, 2002	Anderson Mesa	LONEOS	·	5.1 km	MPC · JPL
112970	2002 RN_{19}	—	September 4, 2002	Anderson Mesa	LONEOS	·	5.6 km	MPC · JPL
112971	2002 RA_{20}	—	September 4, 2002	Anderson Mesa	LONEOS	·	8.6 km	MPC · JPL
112972	2002 RJ_{20}	—	September 4, 2002	Anderson Mesa	LONEOS	KOR	2.8 km	MPC · JPL
112973	2002 RK_{20}	—	September 4, 2002	Anderson Mesa	LONEOS	·	1.7 km	MPC · JPL
112974	2002 RP_{20}	—	September 4, 2002	Anderson Mesa	LONEOS	·	6.4 km	MPC · JPL
112975	2002 RX_{20}	—	September 4, 2002	Anderson Mesa	LONEOS	EOS	4.3 km	MPC · JPL
112976	2002 RF_{22}	—	September 4, 2002	Anderson Mesa	LONEOS	·	4.6 km	MPC · JPL
112977	2002 RE_{23}	—	September 4, 2002	Anderson Mesa	LONEOS	ERI	2.2 km	MPC · JPL
112978	2002 RY_{23}	—	September 4, 2002	Anderson Mesa	LONEOS	·	1.0 km	MPC · JPL
112979	2002 RK_{24}	—	September 4, 2002	Anderson Mesa	LONEOS	·	2.9 km	MPC · JPL
112980	2002 RT_{24}	—	September 4, 2002	Anderson Mesa	LONEOS	·	4.2 km	MPC · JPL
112981	2002 RK_{25}	—	September 4, 2002	Anderson Mesa	LONEOS	·	3.4 km	MPC · JPL
112982	2002 RA_{27}	—	September 5, 2002	Socorro	LINEAR	PHO	2.0 km	MPC · JPL
112983	2002 RV_{27}	—	September 4, 2002	Anderson Mesa	LONEOS	TIN	2.7 km	MPC · JPL
112984	2002 RF_{28}	—	September 5, 2002	Anderson Mesa	LONEOS	·	5.4 km	MPC · JPL
112985	2002 RS_{28}	—	September 6, 2002	Socorro	LINEAR	AMO +1km	3.6 km	MPC · JPL
112986	2002 RJ_{29}	—	September 3, 2002	Haleakala	NEAT	·	1.3 km	MPC · JPL
112987	2002 RK_{31}	—	September 4, 2002	Anderson Mesa	LONEOS	·	2.1 km	MPC · JPL
112988	2002 RO_{31}	—	September 4, 2002	Anderson Mesa	LONEOS	NEM	5.1 km	MPC · JPL
112989	2002 RB_{32}	—	September 4, 2002	Anderson Mesa	LONEOS	(5)	2.8 km	MPC · JPL
112990	2002 RN_{32}	—	September 4, 2002	Anderson Mesa	LONEOS	HYG ·	5.5 km	MPC · JPL
112991	2002 RG_{33}	—	September 4, 2002	Anderson Mesa	LONEOS	·	5.0 km	MPC · JPL
112992	2002 RX_{33}	—	September 4, 2002	Anderson Mesa	LONEOS	VER	6.2 km	MPC · JPL
112993	2002 RY_{33}	—	September 4, 2002	Anderson Mesa	LONEOS	·	2.8 km	MPC · JPL
112994	2002 RP_{34}	—	September 4, 2002	Anderson Mesa	LONEOS	·	7.6 km	MPC · JPL
112995	2002 RD_{35}	—	September 4, 2002	Anderson Mesa	LONEOS	MAR	3.1 km	MPC · JPL
112996	2002 RF_{37}	—	September 5, 2002	Anderson Mesa	LONEOS	V	1.2 km	MPC · JPL
112997	2002 RK_{37}	—	September 5, 2002	Socorro	LINEAR	THM	3.7 km	MPC · JPL
112998	2002 RN_{37}	—	September 5, 2002	Anderson Mesa	LONEOS	V	1.3 km	MPC · JPL
112999	2002 RG_{38}	—	September 5, 2002	Anderson Mesa	LONEOS	·	6.0 km	MPC · JPL
113000	2002 RL_{38}	—	September 5, 2002	Anderson Mesa	LONEOS	·	2.6 km	MPC · JPL

back to top

== See also ==
- Meanings of minor-planet names: 112001–113000
