= Meanings of minor-planet names: 111001–112000 =

As minor planet discoveries are confirmed, they are given a permanent number by the IAU's Minor Planet Center (MPC), and the discoverers can then submit names for them, following the IAU's naming conventions. The list below concerns those minor planets in the specified number-range that have received names, and explains the meanings of those names.

Official naming citations of newly named small Solar System bodies are approved and published in a bulletin by IAU's Working Group for Small Bodies Nomenclature (WGSBN). Before May 2021, citations were published in MPC's Minor Planet Circulars for many decades. Recent citations can also be found on the JPL Small-Body Database (SBDB). Until his death in 2016, German astronomer Lutz D. Schmadel compiled these citations into the Dictionary of Minor Planet Names (DMP) and regularly updated the collection.

Based on Paul Herget's The Names of the Minor Planets, Schmadel also researched the unclear origin of numerous asteroids, most of which had been named prior to World War II. This article incorporates text from this source, which is in the public domain: SBDB New namings may only be added to this list below after official publication as the preannouncement of names is condemned. The WGSBN publishes a comprehensive guideline for the naming rules of non-cometary small Solar System bodies.

== 111001–111100 ==
Named minor planet	Provisional	This minor planet was named for...	Ref · Catalog
There are no named minor planets in this number range

== 111101–111200 ==
back to top

Named minor planet	Provisional	This minor planet was named for...	Ref · Catalog
There are no named minor planets in this number range

== 111201–111300 ==
back to top

Named minor planet	Provisional	This minor planet was named for...	Ref · Catalog
There are no named minor planets in this number range

== 111301–111400 ==
back to top

Named minor planet	Provisional	This minor planet was named for...	Ref · Catalog
There are no named minor planets in this number range

== 111401–111500 ==
back to top

Named minor planet	Provisional	This minor planet was named for...	Ref · Catalog
111468 Alba Regia	2001 YD_{5}	Alba Regia, "White Region", the Roman name of the Hungarian town of Székesfehérvár, birthplace of the second discoverer	JPL · 111468

== 111501–111600 ==
back to top

Named minor planet	Provisional	This minor planet was named for...	Ref · Catalog
111558 Barrett	2002 AZ	Michael Barrett (born 1955), American amateur astronomer and eclipse chaser	JPL · 111558
111561 Giovanniallevi	2002 AH_{3}	Giovanni Allevi (born 1969) is an Italian piano soloist and composer of contemporary music.	JPL · 111561
111570 Ágasvár	2002 AG_{11}	Ágasvár, a 635 m peak in the Mátra Mountains, and its Ágasvár hostel, a mountain station of Hungarian amateur astronomers	JPL · 111570
111571 Bebevio	2002 AD_{13}	Beatrice Vio (born 1997), better known as "Bebe Vio", is an Italian wheelchair fencer who won the European championship (2014 and 2016), World championship (2015 and 2017), and Paralympic games (2016 and 2020) in the foil B category.	IAU · 111571
111594 Ráktanya	2002 AX_{66}	Ráktanya, a famed hostel in the Bakony Mountains in Hungary	JPL · 111594

== 111601–111700 ==
back to top

Named minor planet	Provisional	This minor planet was named for...	Ref · Catalog
111660 Jimgray	2002 AP_{205}	Jim Gray (1944–2007), an American computer scientist who received the Turing Award in 1998	JPL · 111660
111661 Mamiegeorge	2002 BP	Mamie George (1877–1971) and Albert George (1873–1955), husband and wife, founded the George Foundation in 1945 to promote the future of Fort Bend County, Texas	JPL · 111661
111696 Helenorman	2002 CU_{14}	Helen Belton Orman (1938–2004), American professor and artist	JPL · 111696

== 111701–111800 ==
back to top

Named minor planet	Provisional	This minor planet was named for...	Ref · Catalog
There are no named minor planets in this number range

== 111801–111900 ==
back to top

Named minor planet	Provisional	This minor planet was named for...	Ref · Catalog
111818 Deforest	2002 DT	Craig Edward DeForest (born 1968), an American solar physicist	JPL · 111818

== 111901–112000 ==
back to top

Named minor planet	Provisional	This minor planet was named for...	Ref · Catalog
111913 Davidgans	2002 GD	David Gans (1541–1613), a Jewish chronicler, mathematician, geographer and astronomer	JPL · 111913
111933 Alphonsetardif	2002 GK_{37}	Alphonse Tardif (1933–2022), a Canadian abbot, physics teacher and astronomy mentor at the Collège de Lévis	IAU · 111933

back to top

Preceded by 110,001–111,000	Meanings of minor-planet names List of minor planets: 111,001–112,000	Succeeded by 112,001–113,000
