= List of minor planets: 111001–112000 =

The following is a partial list of minor planets, running from minor-planet number 111001 through 112000, inclusive. The primary data for this and other partial lists is based on JPL's "Small-Body Orbital Elements" and data available from the Minor Planet Center. Critical list information is also provided by the MPC, unless otherwise specified from Lowell Observatory. A detailed description of the table's columns and additional sources are given on the main page including a complete list of every page in this series, and a statistical break-up on the dynamical classification of minor planets.

Also see the summary list of all named bodies in numerical and alphabetical order, and the corresponding naming citations for the number range of this particular list. New namings may only be added to this list after official publication, as the preannouncement of names is condemned by the Working Group for Small Bodies Nomenclature of the International Astronomical Union.

Near-Earth obj.	MBA (inner)	MBA (outer)	Centaur
Mars-crosser	MBA (middle)	Jupiter trojan	Trans-Neptunian obj.
Unclassified

== 111001–111100 ==
Designation			Discovery			Properties		Ref
Permanent	Provisional	Named after	Date	Site	Discoverer(s)	Category	Diam.	Ref
111001	2001 UG_{222}	—	October 16, 2001	Kitt Peak	Spacewatch	·	2.7 km	MPC · JPL
111002	2001 VN	—	November 6, 2001	Socorro	LINEAR	H	1.1 km	MPC · JPL
111003	2001 VU	—	November 6, 2001	Socorro	LINEAR	fast	3.2 km	MPC · JPL
111004	2001 VX	—	November 6, 2001	Socorro	LINEAR	BRA	3.3 km	MPC · JPL
111005	2001 VY	—	November 6, 2001	Socorro	LINEAR	EUN	2.5 km	MPC · JPL
111006	2001 VZ	—	November 6, 2001	Socorro	LINEAR	AEG	6.1 km	MPC · JPL
111007	2001 VG_{1}	—	November 7, 2001	Palomar	NEAT	GEF	3.6 km	MPC · JPL
111008	2001 VF_{3}	—	November 9, 2001	Kitt Peak	Spacewatch	·	3.5 km	MPC · JPL
111009	2001 VW_{3}	—	November 11, 2001	Kitt Peak	Spacewatch	·	3.1 km	MPC · JPL
111010	2001 VN_{5}	—	November 7, 2001	Socorro	LINEAR	·	7.7 km	MPC · JPL
111011	2001 VQ_{5}	—	November 9, 2001	Socorro	LINEAR	·	4.7 km	MPC · JPL
111012	2001 VE_{6}	—	November 9, 2001	Socorro	LINEAR	KOR	2.1 km	MPC · JPL
111013	2001 VB_{7}	—	November 9, 2001	Socorro	LINEAR	AGN	3.2 km	MPC · JPL
111014	2001 VN_{7}	—	November 9, 2001	Socorro	LINEAR	KOR	2.3 km	MPC · JPL
111015	2001 VW_{7}	—	November 9, 2001	Socorro	LINEAR	·	4.3 km	MPC · JPL
111016	2001 VZ_{7}	—	November 9, 2001	Socorro	LINEAR	·	3.2 km	MPC · JPL
111017	2001 VT_{8}	—	November 9, 2001	Socorro	LINEAR	·	4.0 km	MPC · JPL
111018	2001 VW_{9}	—	November 10, 2001	Socorro	LINEAR	MAR	2.7 km	MPC · JPL
111019	2001 VD_{10}	—	November 10, 2001	Socorro	LINEAR	·	3.7 km	MPC · JPL
111020	2001 VE_{11}	—	November 10, 2001	Socorro	LINEAR	·	2.9 km	MPC · JPL
111021	2001 VY_{11}	—	November 10, 2001	Socorro	LINEAR	EUN	3.1 km	MPC · JPL
111022	2001 VK_{12}	—	November 10, 2001	Socorro	LINEAR	·	4.5 km	MPC · JPL
111023	2001 VQ_{12}	—	November 10, 2001	Socorro	LINEAR	·	3.2 km	MPC · JPL
111024	2001 VQ_{14}	—	November 10, 2001	Socorro	LINEAR	EOS	4.3 km	MPC · JPL
111025	2001 VA_{16}	—	November 7, 2001	Palomar	NEAT	·	7.1 km	MPC · JPL
111026	2001 VR_{17}	—	November 9, 2001	Socorro	LINEAR	·	2.4 km	MPC · JPL
111027	2001 VG_{18}	—	November 9, 2001	Socorro	LINEAR	·	7.1 km	MPC · JPL
111028	2001 VV_{19}	—	November 9, 2001	Socorro	LINEAR	RAF	2.4 km	MPC · JPL
111029	2001 VW_{19}	—	November 9, 2001	Socorro	LINEAR	CYB	8.0 km	MPC · JPL
111030	2001 VA_{20}	—	November 9, 2001	Socorro	LINEAR	·	2.2 km	MPC · JPL
111031	2001 VF_{20}	—	November 9, 2001	Socorro	LINEAR	·	2.5 km	MPC · JPL
111032	2001 VJ_{20}	—	November 9, 2001	Socorro	LINEAR	KOR	2.8 km	MPC · JPL
111033	2001 VK_{20}	—	November 9, 2001	Socorro	LINEAR	·	1.8 km	MPC · JPL
111034	2001 VM_{21}	—	November 9, 2001	Socorro	LINEAR	·	4.6 km	MPC · JPL
111035	2001 VU_{21}	—	November 9, 2001	Socorro	LINEAR	·	3.1 km	MPC · JPL
111036	2001 VD_{22}	—	November 9, 2001	Socorro	LINEAR	·	3.9 km	MPC · JPL
111037	2001 VO_{22}	—	November 9, 2001	Socorro	LINEAR	·	3.9 km	MPC · JPL
111038	2001 VR_{22}	—	November 9, 2001	Socorro	LINEAR	KOR	2.9 km	MPC · JPL
111039	2001 VJ_{23}	—	November 9, 2001	Socorro	LINEAR	·	3.3 km	MPC · JPL
111040	2001 VK_{24}	—	November 9, 2001	Socorro	LINEAR	·	2.9 km	MPC · JPL
111041	2001 VO_{25}	—	November 9, 2001	Socorro	LINEAR	·	4.0 km	MPC · JPL
111042	2001 VN_{27}	—	November 9, 2001	Socorro	LINEAR	·	7.3 km	MPC · JPL
111043	2001 VQ_{27}	—	November 9, 2001	Socorro	LINEAR	·	3.2 km	MPC · JPL
111044	2001 VC_{33}	—	November 9, 2001	Socorro	LINEAR	·	5.1 km	MPC · JPL
111045	2001 VL_{33}	—	November 9, 2001	Socorro	LINEAR	·	4.3 km	MPC · JPL
111046	2001 VQ_{33}	—	November 9, 2001	Socorro	LINEAR	EOS	4.1 km	MPC · JPL
111047	2001 VK_{36}	—	November 9, 2001	Socorro	LINEAR	·	1.8 km	MPC · JPL
111048	2001 VM_{36}	—	November 9, 2001	Socorro	LINEAR	KOR	3.4 km	MPC · JPL
111049	2001 VC_{37}	—	November 9, 2001	Socorro	LINEAR	·	4.1 km	MPC · JPL
111050	2001 VK_{37}	—	November 9, 2001	Socorro	LINEAR	·	1.3 km	MPC · JPL
111051	2001 VM_{37}	—	November 9, 2001	Socorro	LINEAR	·	1.5 km	MPC · JPL
111052	2001 VP_{38}	—	November 9, 2001	Socorro	LINEAR	·	2.9 km	MPC · JPL
111053	2001 VF_{39}	—	November 9, 2001	Socorro	LINEAR	NEM	4.3 km	MPC · JPL
111054	2001 VG_{39}	—	November 9, 2001	Socorro	LINEAR	·	2.7 km	MPC · JPL
111055	2001 VK_{39}	—	November 9, 2001	Socorro	LINEAR	KOR	2.6 km	MPC · JPL
111056	2001 VA_{40}	—	November 9, 2001	Socorro	LINEAR	·	2.9 km	MPC · JPL
111057	2001 VD_{40}	—	November 9, 2001	Socorro	LINEAR	·	3.8 km	MPC · JPL
111058	2001 VN_{40}	—	November 9, 2001	Socorro	LINEAR	KOR	2.8 km	MPC · JPL
111059	2001 VB_{42}	—	November 9, 2001	Socorro	LINEAR	·	3.4 km	MPC · JPL
111060	2001 VK_{43}	—	November 9, 2001	Socorro	LINEAR	·	6.4 km	MPC · JPL
111061	2001 VZ_{43}	—	November 9, 2001	Socorro	LINEAR	TIR	6.2 km	MPC · JPL
111062	2001 VD_{45}	—	November 9, 2001	Socorro	LINEAR	·	5.0 km	MPC · JPL
111063	2001 VL_{45}	—	November 9, 2001	Socorro	LINEAR	·	4.0 km	MPC · JPL
111064	2001 VM_{45}	—	November 9, 2001	Socorro	LINEAR	·	8.4 km	MPC · JPL
111065	2001 VX_{45}	—	November 9, 2001	Socorro	LINEAR	·	2.7 km	MPC · JPL
111066	2001 VA_{47}	—	November 9, 2001	Socorro	LINEAR	·	7.0 km	MPC · JPL
111067	2001 VH_{48}	—	November 9, 2001	Socorro	LINEAR	EOS	5.3 km	MPC · JPL
111068	2001 VP_{48}	—	November 9, 2001	Socorro	LINEAR	ADE	6.3 km	MPC · JPL
111069	2001 VS_{48}	—	November 9, 2001	Socorro	LINEAR	·	5.9 km	MPC · JPL
111070	2001 VF_{49}	—	November 10, 2001	Socorro	LINEAR	EUN	3.0 km	MPC · JPL
111071	2001 VX_{49}	—	November 10, 2001	Socorro	LINEAR	MAR	2.1 km	MPC · JPL
111072	2001 VL_{51}	—	November 10, 2001	Socorro	LINEAR	·	3.1 km	MPC · JPL
111073	2001 VU_{51}	—	November 10, 2001	Socorro	LINEAR	·	4.9 km	MPC · JPL
111074	2001 VW_{51}	—	November 10, 2001	Socorro	LINEAR	PAD · slow	2.9 km	MPC · JPL
111075	2001 VD_{52}	—	November 10, 2001	Socorro	LINEAR	·	3.8 km	MPC · JPL
111076	2001 VH_{52}	—	November 10, 2001	Socorro	LINEAR	·	2.6 km	MPC · JPL
111077	2001 VS_{54}	—	November 10, 2001	Socorro	LINEAR	·	4.5 km	MPC · JPL
111078	2001 VG_{55}	—	November 10, 2001	Socorro	LINEAR	·	4.9 km	MPC · JPL
111079	2001 VJ_{56}	—	November 10, 2001	Socorro	LINEAR	·	3.4 km	MPC · JPL
111080	2001 VM_{56}	—	November 10, 2001	Socorro	LINEAR	·	3.8 km	MPC · JPL
111081	2001 VJ_{57}	—	November 10, 2001	Socorro	LINEAR	·	3.1 km	MPC · JPL
111082	2001 VF_{58}	—	November 10, 2001	Socorro	LINEAR	·	2.9 km	MPC · JPL
111083	2001 VJ_{58}	—	November 10, 2001	Socorro	LINEAR	·	2.3 km	MPC · JPL
111084	2001 VK_{58}	—	November 10, 2001	Socorro	LINEAR	MAR	2.2 km	MPC · JPL
111085	2001 VP_{60}	—	November 10, 2001	Socorro	LINEAR	·	4.1 km	MPC · JPL
111086	2001 VP_{61}	—	November 10, 2001	Socorro	LINEAR	·	4.3 km	MPC · JPL
111087	2001 VV_{61}	—	November 10, 2001	Socorro	LINEAR	·	3.6 km	MPC · JPL
111088	2001 VA_{62}	—	November 10, 2001	Socorro	LINEAR	·	3.8 km	MPC · JPL
111089	2001 VK_{62}	—	November 10, 2001	Socorro	LINEAR	ADE	5.3 km	MPC · JPL
111090	2001 VF_{63}	—	November 10, 2001	Socorro	LINEAR	·	3.8 km	MPC · JPL
111091	2001 VL_{63}	—	November 10, 2001	Socorro	LINEAR	·	3.0 km	MPC · JPL
111092	2001 VL_{64}	—	November 10, 2001	Socorro	LINEAR	·	4.8 km	MPC · JPL
111093	2001 VV_{65}	—	November 10, 2001	Socorro	LINEAR	·	2.8 km	MPC · JPL
111094	2001 VA_{66}	—	November 10, 2001	Socorro	LINEAR	(5)	3.0 km	MPC · JPL
111095	2001 VC_{67}	—	November 10, 2001	Socorro	LINEAR	·	3.7 km	MPC · JPL
111096	2001 VM_{67}	—	November 10, 2001	Socorro	LINEAR	V	1.2 km	MPC · JPL
111097	2001 VW_{68}	—	November 11, 2001	Socorro	LINEAR	·	2.6 km	MPC · JPL
111098	2001 VN_{69}	—	November 11, 2001	Socorro	LINEAR	·	3.5 km	MPC · JPL
111099	2001 VO_{69}	—	November 11, 2001	Socorro	LINEAR	·	7.2 km	MPC · JPL
111100	2001 VA_{71}	—	November 11, 2001	Socorro	LINEAR	·	3.6 km	MPC · JPL

== 111101–111200 ==
back to top

Designation			Discovery			Properties		Ref
Permanent	Provisional	Named after	Date	Site	Discoverer(s)	Category	Diam.	Ref
111101	2001 VC_{74}	—	November 11, 2001	Socorro	LINEAR	·	4.2 km	MPC · JPL
111102	2001 VF_{74}	—	November 12, 2001	Socorro	LINEAR	MAR	2.3 km	MPC · JPL
111103	2001 VX_{74}	—	November 14, 2001	Kitt Peak	Spacewatch	·	3.1 km	MPC · JPL
111104	2001 VE_{75}	—	November 11, 2001	Palomar	NEAT	·	2.7 km	MPC · JPL
111105	2001 VC_{78}	—	November 11, 2001	Kitt Peak	Spacewatch	·	4.4 km	MPC · JPL
111106	2001 VO_{78}	—	November 15, 2001	Socorro	LINEAR	H	1.0 km	MPC · JPL
111107	2001 VZ_{79}	—	November 9, 2001	Palomar	NEAT	·	3.5 km	MPC · JPL
111108	2001 VG_{80}	—	November 9, 2001	Palomar	NEAT	·	2.2 km	MPC · JPL
111109	2001 VB_{81}	—	November 10, 2001	Palomar	NEAT	·	5.8 km	MPC · JPL
111110	2001 VK_{82}	—	November 10, 2001	Socorro	LINEAR	·	3.5 km	MPC · JPL
111111	2001 VO_{84}	—	November 12, 2001	Socorro	LINEAR	·	3.2 km	MPC · JPL
111112	2001 VU_{84}	—	November 12, 2001	Socorro	LINEAR	·	4.2 km	MPC · JPL
111113	2001 VK_{85}	—	November 12, 2001	Socorro	LINEAR	L5	15 km	MPC · JPL
111114	2001 VR_{86}	—	November 13, 2001	Socorro	LINEAR	·	2.5 km	MPC · JPL
111115	2001 VW_{86}	—	November 15, 2001	Socorro	LINEAR	ADE	6.0 km	MPC · JPL
111116	2001 VA_{87}	—	November 15, 2001	Socorro	LINEAR	·	3.6 km	MPC · JPL
111117	2001 VJ_{87}	—	November 11, 2001	Kitt Peak	Spacewatch	·	2.2 km	MPC · JPL
111118	2001 VZ_{87}	—	November 12, 2001	Haleakala	NEAT	NEM	3.9 km	MPC · JPL
111119	2001 VO_{88}	—	November 15, 2001	Palomar	NEAT	·	3.9 km	MPC · JPL
111120	2001 VV_{88}	—	November 12, 2001	Anderson Mesa	LONEOS	MAR	3.0 km	MPC · JPL
111121	2001 VV_{89}	—	November 13, 2001	Socorro	LINEAR	·	4.9 km	MPC · JPL
111122	2001 VX_{89}	—	November 15, 2001	Socorro	LINEAR	·	4.2 km	MPC · JPL
111123	2001 VL_{90}	—	November 15, 2001	Socorro	LINEAR	·	5.3 km	MPC · JPL
111124	2001 VF_{91}	—	November 15, 2001	Socorro	LINEAR	·	2.9 km	MPC · JPL
111125	2001 VL_{91}	—	November 15, 2001	Socorro	LINEAR	AEG	6.3 km	MPC · JPL
111126	2001 VG_{92}	—	November 15, 2001	Socorro	LINEAR	EOS	3.8 km	MPC · JPL
111127	2001 VJ_{92}	—	November 15, 2001	Socorro	LINEAR	EUN	2.1 km	MPC · JPL
111128	2001 VN_{92}	—	November 15, 2001	Socorro	LINEAR	·	3.0 km	MPC · JPL
111129	2001 VQ_{92}	—	November 15, 2001	Socorro	LINEAR	·	5.0 km	MPC · JPL
111130	2001 VS_{92}	—	November 15, 2001	Socorro	LINEAR	·	3.4 km	MPC · JPL
111131	2001 VT_{92}	—	November 15, 2001	Socorro	LINEAR	·	4.1 km	MPC · JPL
111132	2001 VX_{92}	—	November 15, 2001	Socorro	LINEAR	·	4.0 km	MPC · JPL
111133	2001 VY_{92}	—	November 15, 2001	Socorro	LINEAR	·	3.9 km	MPC · JPL
111134	2001 VZ_{93}	—	November 15, 2001	Socorro	LINEAR	·	7.2 km	MPC · JPL
111135	2001 VE_{94}	—	November 15, 2001	Socorro	LINEAR	·	2.8 km	MPC · JPL
111136	2001 VJ_{94}	—	November 15, 2001	Socorro	LINEAR	ADE	3.5 km	MPC · JPL
111137	2001 VP_{94}	—	November 15, 2001	Socorro	LINEAR	·	3.5 km	MPC · JPL
111138	2001 VK_{95}	—	November 15, 2001	Socorro	LINEAR	EOS	3.3 km	MPC · JPL
111139	2001 VS_{95}	—	November 15, 2001	Socorro	LINEAR	EOS	3.7 km	MPC · JPL
111140	2001 VV_{96}	—	November 15, 2001	Socorro	LINEAR	EUN	2.5 km	MPC · JPL
111141	2001 VY_{97}	—	November 15, 2001	Socorro	LINEAR	·	2.6 km	MPC · JPL
111142	2001 VL_{98}	—	November 15, 2001	Socorro	LINEAR	·	4.5 km	MPC · JPL
111143	2001 VM_{98}	—	November 15, 2001	Socorro	LINEAR	H	1.2 km	MPC · JPL
111144	2001 VH_{99}	—	November 15, 2001	Socorro	LINEAR	·	3.8 km	MPC · JPL
111145	2001 VR_{99}	—	November 15, 2001	Socorro	LINEAR	·	6.4 km	MPC · JPL
111146	2001 VT_{99}	—	November 15, 2001	Socorro	LINEAR	·	3.9 km	MPC · JPL
111147	2001 VW_{99}	—	November 15, 2001	Socorro	LINEAR	·	4.4 km	MPC · JPL
111148	2001 VY_{99}	—	November 15, 2001	Socorro	LINEAR	·	2.6 km	MPC · JPL
111149	2001 VO_{101}	—	November 12, 2001	Socorro	LINEAR	PAD	4.2 km	MPC · JPL
111150	2001 VS_{101}	—	November 12, 2001	Socorro	LINEAR	·	3.9 km	MPC · JPL
111151	2001 VX_{101}	—	November 12, 2001	Socorro	LINEAR	·	3.8 km	MPC · JPL
111152	2001 VZ_{102}	—	November 12, 2001	Socorro	LINEAR	slow	3.0 km	MPC · JPL
111153	2001 VA_{104}	—	November 12, 2001	Socorro	LINEAR	·	3.3 km	MPC · JPL
111154	2001 VG_{104}	—	November 12, 2001	Socorro	LINEAR	·	2.3 km	MPC · JPL
111155	2001 VO_{104}	—	November 12, 2001	Socorro	LINEAR	·	3.5 km	MPC · JPL
111156	2001 VR_{104}	—	November 12, 2001	Socorro	LINEAR	·	3.5 km	MPC · JPL
111157	2001 VZ_{104}	—	November 12, 2001	Socorro	LINEAR	·	3.3 km	MPC · JPL
111158	2001 VJ_{107}	—	November 12, 2001	Socorro	LINEAR	·	3.1 km	MPC · JPL
111159	2001 VA_{108}	—	November 12, 2001	Socorro	LINEAR	·	2.9 km	MPC · JPL
111160	2001 VE_{108}	—	November 12, 2001	Socorro	LINEAR	THM	3.9 km	MPC · JPL
111161	2001 VT_{108}	—	November 12, 2001	Socorro	LINEAR	NEM	3.9 km	MPC · JPL
111162	2001 VY_{111}	—	November 12, 2001	Socorro	LINEAR	KOR	2.0 km	MPC · JPL
111163	2001 VW_{112}	—	November 12, 2001	Socorro	LINEAR	GEF	2.3 km	MPC · JPL
111164	2001 VM_{113}	—	November 12, 2001	Socorro	LINEAR	·	3.9 km	MPC · JPL
111165	2001 VJ_{114}	—	November 12, 2001	Socorro	LINEAR	NEM	4.9 km	MPC · JPL
111166	2001 VN_{115}	—	November 12, 2001	Socorro	LINEAR	KOR ·	2.5 km	MPC · JPL
111167	2001 VZ_{115}	—	November 12, 2001	Socorro	LINEAR	·	3.2 km	MPC · JPL
111168	2001 VQ_{116}	—	November 12, 2001	Socorro	LINEAR	·	2.7 km	MPC · JPL
111169	2001 VO_{117}	—	November 12, 2001	Socorro	LINEAR	·	4.2 km	MPC · JPL
111170	2001 VG_{120}	—	November 12, 2001	Socorro	LINEAR	·	3.2 km	MPC · JPL
111171	2001 VL_{120}	—	November 12, 2001	Socorro	LINEAR	·	3.4 km	MPC · JPL
111172	2001 VK_{121}	—	November 15, 2001	Palomar	NEAT	·	2.2 km	MPC · JPL
111173	2001 VX_{121}	—	November 13, 2001	Haleakala	NEAT	·	3.4 km	MPC · JPL
111174	2001 VZ_{121}	—	November 13, 2001	Haleakala	NEAT	·	4.1 km	MPC · JPL
111175	2001 VT_{122}	—	November 15, 2001	Palomar	NEAT	·	3.5 km	MPC · JPL
111176	2001 VU_{122}	—	November 15, 2001	Palomar	NEAT	·	4.8 km	MPC · JPL
111177	2001 VY_{122}	—	November 11, 2001	Anderson Mesa	LONEOS	·	4.5 km	MPC · JPL
111178	2001 VL_{125}	—	November 11, 2001	Kitt Peak	Spacewatch	DOR	4.4 km	MPC · JPL
111179	2001 WG	—	November 16, 2001	Bisei SG Center	BATTeRS	·	2.7 km	MPC · JPL
111180	2001 WV_{2}	—	November 16, 2001	Kitt Peak	Spacewatch	(12739)	2.7 km	MPC · JPL
111181	2001 WB_{4}	—	November 17, 2001	Kitt Peak	Spacewatch	·	4.7 km	MPC · JPL
111182	2001 WF_{4}	—	November 19, 2001	Oizumi	T. Kobayashi	·	4.0 km	MPC · JPL
111183	2001 WM_{5}	—	November 17, 2001	Haleakala	NEAT	MAR	1.9 km	MPC · JPL
111184	2001 WZ_{6}	—	November 17, 2001	Socorro	LINEAR	HYG	4.7 km	MPC · JPL
111185	2001 WH_{7}	—	November 17, 2001	Socorro	LINEAR	KOR	2.2 km	MPC · JPL
111186	2001 WA_{8}	—	November 17, 2001	Socorro	LINEAR	slow	3.4 km	MPC · JPL
111187	2001 WG_{8}	—	November 17, 2001	Socorro	LINEAR	·	2.4 km	MPC · JPL
111188	2001 WG_{9}	—	November 17, 2001	Socorro	LINEAR	AGN	2.6 km	MPC · JPL
111189	2001 WW_{9}	—	November 17, 2001	Socorro	LINEAR	AEO	2.3 km	MPC · JPL
111190	2001 WO_{13}	—	November 17, 2001	Socorro	LINEAR	·	2.8 km	MPC · JPL
111191	2001 WY_{15}	—	November 26, 2001	Socorro	LINEAR	·	4.8 km	MPC · JPL
111192	2001 WX_{16}	—	November 17, 2001	Socorro	LINEAR	·	3.2 km	MPC · JPL
111193	2001 WO_{17}	—	November 17, 2001	Socorro	LINEAR	·	2.8 km	MPC · JPL
111194	2001 WP_{18}	—	November 17, 2001	Socorro	LINEAR	·	3.0 km	MPC · JPL
111195	2001 WG_{19}	—	November 17, 2001	Socorro	LINEAR	(12739)	3.1 km	MPC · JPL
111196	2001 WO_{19}	—	November 17, 2001	Socorro	LINEAR	·	2.1 km	MPC · JPL
111197	2001 WF_{20}	—	November 17, 2001	Socorro	LINEAR	·	3.3 km	MPC · JPL
111198	2001 WX_{20}	—	November 18, 2001	Socorro	LINEAR	L5	10 km	MPC · JPL
111199	2001 WW_{21}	—	November 18, 2001	Socorro	LINEAR	·	4.7 km	MPC · JPL
111200	2001 WZ_{22}	—	November 27, 2001	Socorro	LINEAR	H	1.2 km	MPC · JPL

== 111201–111300 ==
back to top

Designation			Discovery			Properties		Ref
Permanent	Provisional	Named after	Date	Site	Discoverer(s)	Category	Diam.	Ref
111201	2001 WT_{24}	—	November 18, 2001	Kitt Peak	Spacewatch	KOR	2.4 km	MPC · JPL
111202	2001 WY_{24}	—	November 18, 2001	Kitt Peak	Spacewatch	·	3.6 km	MPC · JPL
111203	2001 WC_{27}	—	November 17, 2001	Socorro	LINEAR	·	2.4 km	MPC · JPL
111204	2001 WK_{27}	—	November 17, 2001	Socorro	LINEAR	·	3.5 km	MPC · JPL
111205	2001 WN_{27}	—	November 17, 2001	Socorro	LINEAR	·	2.5 km	MPC · JPL
111206	2001 WM_{29}	—	November 17, 2001	Socorro	LINEAR	·	1.4 km	MPC · JPL
111207	2001 WZ_{29}	—	November 17, 2001	Socorro	LINEAR	(5)	2.0 km	MPC · JPL
111208	2001 WW_{30}	—	November 17, 2001	Socorro	LINEAR	·	4.5 km	MPC · JPL
111209	2001 WB_{31}	—	November 17, 2001	Socorro	LINEAR	·	1.2 km	MPC · JPL
111210	2001 WF_{31}	—	November 17, 2001	Socorro	LINEAR	·	2.7 km	MPC · JPL
111211	2001 WW_{32}	—	November 17, 2001	Socorro	LINEAR	·	1.8 km	MPC · JPL
111212	2001 WB_{35}	—	November 17, 2001	Socorro	LINEAR	·	2.6 km	MPC · JPL
111213	2001 WD_{35}	—	November 17, 2001	Socorro	LINEAR	·	3.9 km	MPC · JPL
111214	2001 WV_{35}	—	November 17, 2001	Socorro	LINEAR	PAD	3.1 km	MPC · JPL
111215	2001 WL_{36}	—	November 17, 2001	Socorro	LINEAR	·	4.6 km	MPC · JPL
111216	2001 WM_{39}	—	November 17, 2001	Socorro	LINEAR	(5)	2.5 km	MPC · JPL
111217	2001 WU_{39}	—	November 17, 2001	Socorro	LINEAR	(5)	2.2 km	MPC · JPL
111218	2001 WF_{40}	—	November 17, 2001	Socorro	LINEAR	(5)	1.9 km	MPC · JPL
111219	2001 WJ_{40}	—	November 17, 2001	Socorro	LINEAR	·	6.2 km	MPC · JPL
111220	2001 WP_{40}	—	November 17, 2001	Socorro	LINEAR	·	4.4 km	MPC · JPL
111221	2001 WA_{41}	—	November 17, 2001	Socorro	LINEAR	·	5.0 km	MPC · JPL
111222	2001 WF_{41}	—	November 17, 2001	Socorro	LINEAR	·	6.6 km	MPC · JPL
111223	2001 WS_{41}	—	November 17, 2001	Socorro	LINEAR	·	6.9 km	MPC · JPL
111224	2001 WZ_{42}	—	November 18, 2001	Socorro	LINEAR	·	4.0 km	MPC · JPL
111225	2001 WE_{44}	—	November 18, 2001	Socorro	LINEAR	KOR	2.4 km	MPC · JPL
111226	2001 WO_{48}	—	November 19, 2001	Anderson Mesa	LONEOS	·	5.3 km	MPC · JPL
111227	2001 WW_{52}	—	November 19, 2001	Socorro	LINEAR	·	2.6 km	MPC · JPL
111228	2001 WY_{52}	—	November 19, 2001	Socorro	LINEAR	PAD	3.8 km	MPC · JPL
111229	2001 WO_{55}	—	November 19, 2001	Socorro	LINEAR	·	3.9 km	MPC · JPL
111230	2001 WR_{59}	—	November 19, 2001	Socorro	LINEAR	·	3.0 km	MPC · JPL
111231	2001 WM_{60}	—	November 19, 2001	Socorro	LINEAR	L5	10 km	MPC · JPL
111232	2001 WS_{62}	—	November 19, 2001	Socorro	LINEAR	·	2.5 km	MPC · JPL
111233	2001 WP_{70}	—	November 20, 2001	Socorro	LINEAR	·	4.8 km	MPC · JPL
111234	2001 WG_{90}	—	November 21, 2001	Socorro	LINEAR	·	2.9 km	MPC · JPL
111235	2001 WH_{90}	—	November 21, 2001	Socorro	LINEAR	·	3.6 km	MPC · JPL
111236	2001 WJ_{90}	—	November 21, 2001	Socorro	LINEAR	·	5.0 km	MPC · JPL
111237	2001 WN_{91}	—	November 21, 2001	Socorro	LINEAR	·	3.2 km	MPC · JPL
111238	2001 WO_{91}	—	November 21, 2001	Socorro	LINEAR	·	5.0 km	MPC · JPL
111239	2001 WZ_{97}	—	November 19, 2001	Anderson Mesa	LONEOS	HOF	4.9 km	MPC · JPL
111240	2001 WC_{101}	—	November 16, 2001	Kitt Peak	Spacewatch	·	3.0 km	MPC · JPL
111241	2001 XV	—	December 7, 2001	Bisei SG Center	BATTeRS	·	7.6 km	MPC · JPL
111242	2001 XG_{2}	—	December 8, 2001	Socorro	LINEAR	BRU	5.7 km	MPC · JPL
111243	2001 XS_{2}	—	December 8, 2001	Socorro	LINEAR	H	1.2 km	MPC · JPL
111244	2001 XV_{2}	—	December 8, 2001	Socorro	LINEAR	EUP	7.5 km	MPC · JPL
111245	2001 XE_{3}	—	December 9, 2001	Socorro	LINEAR	·	5.0 km	MPC · JPL
111246	2001 XD_{4}	—	December 9, 2001	Socorro	LINEAR	H	1.3 km	MPC · JPL
111247	2001 XF_{4}	—	December 10, 2001	Socorro	LINEAR	H	1.1 km	MPC · JPL
111248	2001 XT_{7}	—	December 8, 2001	Socorro	LINEAR	·	5.1 km	MPC · JPL
111249	2001 XE_{8}	—	December 8, 2001	Socorro	LINEAR	·	6.7 km	MPC · JPL
111250	2001 XE_{9}	—	December 9, 2001	Socorro	LINEAR	·	4.8 km	MPC · JPL
111251	2001 XX_{9}	—	December 9, 2001	Socorro	LINEAR	(5)	2.1 km	MPC · JPL
111252	2001 XA_{10}	—	December 9, 2001	Socorro	LINEAR	(5)	3.2 km	MPC · JPL
111253	2001 XU_{10}	—	December 9, 2001	Socorro	LINEAR	APO +1km · PHA	3.0 km	MPC · JPL
111254	2001 XJ_{15}	—	December 10, 2001	Socorro	LINEAR	·	3.2 km	MPC · JPL
111255	2001 XZ_{15}	—	December 10, 2001	Socorro	LINEAR	·	3.8 km	MPC · JPL
111256	2001 XX_{18}	—	December 9, 2001	Socorro	LINEAR	·	4.6 km	MPC · JPL
111257	2001 XY_{20}	—	December 9, 2001	Socorro	LINEAR	·	8.0 km	MPC · JPL
111258	2001 XO_{22}	—	December 9, 2001	Socorro	LINEAR	·	3.2 km	MPC · JPL
111259	2001 XY_{22}	—	December 9, 2001	Socorro	LINEAR	(5)	2.9 km	MPC · JPL
111260	2001 XR_{24}	—	December 10, 2001	Socorro	LINEAR	·	1.4 km	MPC · JPL
111261	2001 XC_{26}	—	December 10, 2001	Socorro	LINEAR	·	4.9 km	MPC · JPL
111262	2001 XE_{26}	—	December 10, 2001	Socorro	LINEAR	·	7.1 km	MPC · JPL
111263	2001 XK_{26}	—	December 10, 2001	Socorro	LINEAR	H	1.1 km	MPC · JPL
111264	2001 XN_{26}	—	December 10, 2001	Socorro	LINEAR	·	2.4 km	MPC · JPL
111265	2001 XC_{29}	—	December 11, 2001	Socorro	LINEAR	·	3.8 km	MPC · JPL
111266	2001 XK_{29}	—	December 11, 2001	Socorro	LINEAR	·	3.4 km	MPC · JPL
111267	2001 XN_{29}	—	December 11, 2001	Socorro	LINEAR	·	8.6 km	MPC · JPL
111268	2001 XN_{31}	—	December 11, 2001	Socorro	LINEAR	·	4.6 km	MPC · JPL
111269	2001 XC_{32}	—	December 7, 2001	Kitt Peak	Spacewatch	·	2.9 km	MPC · JPL
111270	2001 XE_{32}	—	December 7, 2001	Kitt Peak	Spacewatch	·	3.9 km	MPC · JPL
111271	2001 XM_{33}	—	December 11, 2001	Kitt Peak	Spacewatch	GEF	2.5 km	MPC · JPL
111272	2001 XN_{33}	—	December 11, 2001	Kitt Peak	Spacewatch	·	2.1 km	MPC · JPL
111273	2001 XW_{34}	—	December 9, 2001	Socorro	LINEAR	·	4.3 km	MPC · JPL
111274	2001 XA_{35}	—	December 13, 2001	Palomar	NEAT	·	3.9 km	MPC · JPL
111275	2001 XF_{36}	—	December 9, 2001	Socorro	LINEAR	EOS	3.8 km	MPC · JPL
111276	2001 XX_{36}	—	December 9, 2001	Socorro	LINEAR	LUT	9.5 km	MPC · JPL
111277	2001 XE_{38}	—	December 9, 2001	Socorro	LINEAR	EOS	3.6 km	MPC · JPL
111278	2001 XG_{38}	—	December 9, 2001	Socorro	LINEAR	·	3.9 km	MPC · JPL
111279	2001 XU_{38}	—	December 9, 2001	Socorro	LINEAR	EOS	4.4 km	MPC · JPL
111280	2001 XD_{39}	—	December 9, 2001	Socorro	LINEAR	GEF	2.2 km	MPC · JPL
111281	2001 XC_{41}	—	December 9, 2001	Socorro	LINEAR	·	4.3 km	MPC · JPL
111282	2001 XD_{41}	—	December 9, 2001	Socorro	LINEAR	·	3.7 km	MPC · JPL
111283	2001 XE_{41}	—	December 9, 2001	Socorro	LINEAR	LIX	8.4 km	MPC · JPL
111284	2001 XH_{42}	—	December 9, 2001	Socorro	LINEAR	H	1.2 km	MPC · JPL
111285	2001 XE_{43}	—	December 9, 2001	Socorro	LINEAR	·	2.4 km	MPC · JPL
111286	2001 XC_{46}	—	December 9, 2001	Socorro	LINEAR	·	3.6 km	MPC · JPL
111287	2001 XT_{47}	—	December 9, 2001	Socorro	LINEAR	·	5.6 km	MPC · JPL
111288	2001 XE_{48}	—	December 10, 2001	Socorro	LINEAR	EUN	3.3 km	MPC · JPL
111289	2001 XE_{50}	—	December 13, 2001	Socorro	LINEAR	·	4.3 km	MPC · JPL
111290	2001 XZ_{50}	—	December 10, 2001	Socorro	LINEAR	·	5.6 km	MPC · JPL
111291	2001 XB_{51}	—	December 10, 2001	Socorro	LINEAR	BRA	5.1 km	MPC · JPL
111292	2001 XN_{51}	—	December 10, 2001	Socorro	LINEAR	EOS	3.7 km	MPC · JPL
111293	2001 XA_{52}	—	December 10, 2001	Socorro	LINEAR	KOR	2.8 km	MPC · JPL
111294	2001 XO_{53}	—	December 10, 2001	Socorro	LINEAR	AEO	2.6 km	MPC · JPL
111295	2001 XR_{53}	—	December 10, 2001	Socorro	LINEAR	MAS	2.1 km	MPC · JPL
111296	2001 XG_{54}	—	December 10, 2001	Socorro	LINEAR	·	2.7 km	MPC · JPL
111297	2001 XH_{55}	—	December 10, 2001	Socorro	LINEAR	·	10 km	MPC · JPL
111298	2001 XZ_{55}	—	December 10, 2001	Socorro	LINEAR	NYS	2.4 km	MPC · JPL
111299	2001 XP_{56}	—	December 10, 2001	Socorro	LINEAR	·	3.1 km	MPC · JPL
111300	2001 XZ_{56}	—	December 11, 2001	Socorro	LINEAR	·	3.3 km	MPC · JPL

== 111301–111400 ==
back to top

Designation			Discovery			Properties		Ref
Permanent	Provisional	Named after	Date	Site	Discoverer(s)	Category	Diam.	Ref
111301	2001 XC_{57}	—	December 11, 2001	Socorro	LINEAR	·	4.3 km	MPC · JPL
111302	2001 XK_{58}	—	December 10, 2001	Socorro	LINEAR	·	4.7 km	MPC · JPL
111303	2001 XT_{58}	—	December 10, 2001	Socorro	LINEAR	·	5.3 km	MPC · JPL
111304	2001 XC_{60}	—	December 10, 2001	Socorro	LINEAR	·	5.6 km	MPC · JPL
111305	2001 XB_{61}	—	December 10, 2001	Socorro	LINEAR	LIX	7.6 km	MPC · JPL
111306	2001 XW_{61}	—	December 10, 2001	Socorro	LINEAR	·	2.7 km	MPC · JPL
111307	2001 XH_{63}	—	December 10, 2001	Socorro	LINEAR	·	5.8 km	MPC · JPL
111308	2001 XT_{64}	—	December 10, 2001	Socorro	LINEAR	·	8.0 km	MPC · JPL
111309	2001 XY_{65}	—	December 11, 2001	Socorro	LINEAR	·	5.2 km	MPC · JPL
111310	2001 XM_{67}	—	December 10, 2001	Socorro	LINEAR	·	5.0 km	MPC · JPL
111311	2001 XK_{68}	—	December 10, 2001	Socorro	LINEAR	·	3.1 km	MPC · JPL
111312	2001 XT_{68}	—	December 11, 2001	Socorro	LINEAR	EUN	3.5 km	MPC · JPL
111313	2001 XC_{69}	—	December 11, 2001	Socorro	LINEAR	·	3.4 km	MPC · JPL
111314	2001 XE_{73}	—	December 11, 2001	Socorro	LINEAR	·	3.6 km	MPC · JPL
111315	2001 XZ_{73}	—	December 11, 2001	Socorro	LINEAR	·	5.8 km	MPC · JPL
111316	2001 XJ_{74}	—	December 11, 2001	Socorro	LINEAR	EOS	4.9 km	MPC · JPL
111317	2001 XZ_{74}	—	December 11, 2001	Socorro	LINEAR	·	3.5 km	MPC · JPL
111318	2001 XH_{75}	—	December 11, 2001	Socorro	LINEAR	·	2.9 km	MPC · JPL
111319	2001 XQ_{75}	—	December 11, 2001	Socorro	LINEAR	·	3.7 km	MPC · JPL
111320	2001 XW_{75}	—	December 11, 2001	Socorro	LINEAR	·	2.5 km	MPC · JPL
111321	2001 XS_{76}	—	December 11, 2001	Socorro	LINEAR	KOR	2.2 km	MPC · JPL
111322	2001 XT_{76}	—	December 11, 2001	Socorro	LINEAR	·	2.8 km	MPC · JPL
111323	2001 XS_{77}	—	December 11, 2001	Socorro	LINEAR	HOF	4.2 km	MPC · JPL
111324	2001 XU_{79}	—	December 11, 2001	Socorro	LINEAR	·	4.1 km	MPC · JPL
111325	2001 XX_{79}	—	December 11, 2001	Socorro	LINEAR	·	1.3 km	MPC · JPL
111326	2001 XJ_{81}	—	December 11, 2001	Socorro	LINEAR	·	3.2 km	MPC · JPL
111327	2001 XP_{84}	—	December 11, 2001	Socorro	LINEAR	·	3.9 km	MPC · JPL
111328	2001 XZ_{85}	—	December 11, 2001	Socorro	LINEAR	(5)	1.9 km	MPC · JPL
111329	2001 XW_{87}	—	December 14, 2001	Desert Eagle	W. K. Y. Yeung	·	7.8 km	MPC · JPL
111330	2001 XX_{87}	—	December 14, 2001	Desert Eagle	W. K. Y. Yeung	·	3.8 km	MPC · JPL
111331	2001 XV_{88}	—	December 9, 2001	Socorro	LINEAR	·	4.2 km	MPC · JPL
111332	2001 XF_{89}	—	December 10, 2001	Socorro	LINEAR	·	4.7 km	MPC · JPL
111333	2001 XR_{90}	—	December 10, 2001	Socorro	LINEAR	HOF	4.8 km	MPC · JPL
111334	2001 XM_{93}	—	December 10, 2001	Socorro	LINEAR	PAD	3.2 km	MPC · JPL
111335	2001 XL_{94}	—	December 10, 2001	Socorro	LINEAR	KOR	2.2 km	MPC · JPL
111336	2001 XW_{94}	—	December 10, 2001	Socorro	LINEAR	·	2.1 km	MPC · JPL
111337	2001 XE_{95}	—	December 10, 2001	Socorro	LINEAR	·	3.2 km	MPC · JPL
111338	2001 XN_{95}	—	December 10, 2001	Socorro	LINEAR	·	2.9 km	MPC · JPL
111339	2001 XY_{95}	—	December 10, 2001	Socorro	LINEAR	·	3.1 km	MPC · JPL
111340	2001 XL_{96}	—	December 10, 2001	Socorro	LINEAR	·	4.9 km	MPC · JPL
111341	2001 XO_{96}	—	December 10, 2001	Socorro	LINEAR	EUN	2.4 km	MPC · JPL
111342	2001 XE_{97}	—	December 10, 2001	Socorro	LINEAR	·	6.0 km	MPC · JPL
111343	2001 XT_{98}	—	December 10, 2001	Socorro	LINEAR	·	4.4 km	MPC · JPL
111344	2001 XS_{99}	—	December 10, 2001	Socorro	LINEAR	(13314)	3.6 km	MPC · JPL
111345	2001 XC_{102}	—	December 11, 2001	Socorro	LINEAR	·	3.3 km	MPC · JPL
111346	2001 XS_{103}	—	December 14, 2001	Socorro	LINEAR	slow?	2.1 km	MPC · JPL
111347	2001 XL_{105}	—	December 7, 2001	Socorro	LINEAR	H	1.0 km	MPC · JPL
111348	2001 XD_{107}	—	December 10, 2001	Socorro	LINEAR	PAD	3.5 km	MPC · JPL
111349	2001 XF_{107}	—	December 10, 2001	Socorro	LINEAR	·	2.9 km	MPC · JPL
111350	2001 XW_{107}	—	December 10, 2001	Socorro	LINEAR	AGN	2.8 km	MPC · JPL
111351	2001 XZ_{107}	—	December 10, 2001	Socorro	LINEAR	·	7.5 km	MPC · JPL
111352	2001 XC_{109}	—	December 10, 2001	Socorro	LINEAR	·	7.3 km	MPC · JPL
111353	2001 XE_{109}	—	December 10, 2001	Socorro	LINEAR	·	2.4 km	MPC · JPL
111354	2001 XQ_{109}	—	December 11, 2001	Socorro	LINEAR	PAD	2.8 km	MPC · JPL
111355	2001 XF_{112}	—	December 11, 2001	Socorro	LINEAR	·	6.0 km	MPC · JPL
111356	2001 XY_{112}	—	December 11, 2001	Socorro	LINEAR	·	4.1 km	MPC · JPL
111357	2001 XB_{113}	—	December 11, 2001	Socorro	LINEAR	·	4.5 km	MPC · JPL
111358	2001 XQ_{114}	—	December 13, 2001	Socorro	LINEAR	·	3.5 km	MPC · JPL
111359	2001 XX_{114}	—	December 13, 2001	Socorro	LINEAR	(7605)	11 km	MPC · JPL
111360	2001 XO_{120}	—	December 14, 2001	Socorro	LINEAR	·	3.0 km	MPC · JPL
111361	2001 XP_{120}	—	December 14, 2001	Socorro	LINEAR	KOR	2.3 km	MPC · JPL
111362	2001 XA_{121}	—	December 14, 2001	Socorro	LINEAR	·	3.2 km	MPC · JPL
111363	2001 XC_{126}	—	December 14, 2001	Socorro	LINEAR	KOR	2.3 km	MPC · JPL
111364	2001 XL_{126}	—	December 14, 2001	Socorro	LINEAR	KOR	2.8 km	MPC · JPL
111365	2001 XQ_{126}	—	December 14, 2001	Socorro	LINEAR	·	2.9 km	MPC · JPL
111366	2001 XM_{127}	—	December 14, 2001	Socorro	LINEAR	·	2.8 km	MPC · JPL
111367	2001 XU_{127}	—	December 14, 2001	Socorro	LINEAR	KOR	2.9 km	MPC · JPL
111368	2001 XR_{131}	—	December 14, 2001	Socorro	LINEAR	·	2.9 km	MPC · JPL
111369	2001 XF_{132}	—	December 14, 2001	Socorro	LINEAR	·	5.7 km	MPC · JPL
111370	2001 XH_{133}	—	December 14, 2001	Socorro	LINEAR	·	4.0 km	MPC · JPL
111371	2001 XY_{136}	—	December 14, 2001	Socorro	LINEAR	·	7.8 km	MPC · JPL
111372	2001 XA_{137}	—	December 14, 2001	Socorro	LINEAR	NEM	4.5 km	MPC · JPL
111373	2001 XV_{137}	—	December 14, 2001	Socorro	LINEAR	·	4.6 km	MPC · JPL
111374	2001 XS_{145}	—	December 14, 2001	Socorro	LINEAR	AST	4.9 km	MPC · JPL
111375	2001 XQ_{147}	—	December 14, 2001	Socorro	LINEAR	KOR	2.5 km	MPC · JPL
111376	2001 XK_{148}	—	December 14, 2001	Socorro	LINEAR	·	7.2 km	MPC · JPL
111377	2001 XJ_{149}	—	December 14, 2001	Socorro	LINEAR	EOS	3.1 km	MPC · JPL
111378	2001 XT_{150}	—	December 14, 2001	Socorro	LINEAR	·	7.0 km	MPC · JPL
111379	2001 XX_{150}	—	December 14, 2001	Socorro	LINEAR	KOR	2.7 km	MPC · JPL
111380	2001 XB_{151}	—	December 14, 2001	Socorro	LINEAR	·	3.4 km	MPC · JPL
111381	2001 XP_{152}	—	December 14, 2001	Socorro	LINEAR	KOR	2.5 km	MPC · JPL
111382	2001 XN_{153}	—	December 14, 2001	Socorro	LINEAR	·	3.1 km	MPC · JPL
111383	2001 XN_{154}	—	December 14, 2001	Socorro	LINEAR	·	3.4 km	MPC · JPL
111384	2001 XA_{156}	—	December 14, 2001	Socorro	LINEAR	·	5.7 km	MPC · JPL
111385	2001 XW_{157}	—	December 14, 2001	Socorro	LINEAR	AGN	2.5 km	MPC · JPL
111386	2001 XM_{158}	—	December 14, 2001	Socorro	LINEAR	EOS	2.9 km	MPC · JPL
111387	2001 XY_{158}	—	December 14, 2001	Socorro	LINEAR	·	1.8 km	MPC · JPL
111388	2001 XF_{159}	—	December 14, 2001	Socorro	LINEAR	·	3.7 km	MPC · JPL
111389	2001 XM_{160}	—	December 14, 2001	Socorro	LINEAR	KOR	2.0 km	MPC · JPL
111390	2001 XS_{160}	—	December 14, 2001	Socorro	LINEAR	MAS	1.4 km	MPC · JPL
111391	2001 XW_{162}	—	December 14, 2001	Socorro	LINEAR	·	2.6 km	MPC · JPL
111392	2001 XL_{164}	—	December 14, 2001	Socorro	LINEAR	HOF	4.6 km	MPC · JPL
111393	2001 XY_{165}	—	December 14, 2001	Socorro	LINEAR	·	5.4 km	MPC · JPL
111394	2001 XQ_{167}	—	December 14, 2001	Socorro	LINEAR	·	5.7 km	MPC · JPL
111395	2001 XK_{168}	—	December 14, 2001	Socorro	LINEAR	·	3.5 km	MPC · JPL
111396	2001 XG_{169}	—	December 14, 2001	Socorro	LINEAR	WAT	4.8 km	MPC · JPL
111397	2001 XA_{171}	—	December 14, 2001	Socorro	LINEAR	EOS	3.4 km	MPC · JPL
111398	2001 XC_{171}	—	December 14, 2001	Socorro	LINEAR	·	3.5 km	MPC · JPL
111399	2001 XK_{173}	—	December 14, 2001	Socorro	LINEAR	·	5.5 km	MPC · JPL
111400	2001 XB_{175}	—	December 14, 2001	Socorro	LINEAR	THM	5.1 km	MPC · JPL

== 111401–111500 ==
back to top

Designation			Discovery			Properties		Ref
Permanent	Provisional	Named after	Date	Site	Discoverer(s)	Category	Diam.	Ref
111401	2001 XT_{175}	—	December 14, 2001	Socorro	LINEAR	TEL	3.0 km	MPC · JPL
111402	2001 XA_{176}	—	December 14, 2001	Socorro	LINEAR	·	1.5 km	MPC · JPL
111403	2001 XN_{176}	—	December 14, 2001	Socorro	LINEAR	·	5.1 km	MPC · JPL
111404	2001 XZ_{177}	—	December 14, 2001	Socorro	LINEAR	·	2.7 km	MPC · JPL
111405	2001 XC_{178}	—	December 14, 2001	Socorro	LINEAR	THM	4.0 km	MPC · JPL
111406	2001 XB_{180}	—	December 14, 2001	Socorro	LINEAR	HYG	5.7 km	MPC · JPL
111407	2001 XC_{183}	—	December 14, 2001	Socorro	LINEAR	EOS	3.4 km	MPC · JPL
111408	2001 XS_{183}	—	December 14, 2001	Socorro	LINEAR	NEM	4.7 km	MPC · JPL
111409	2001 XZ_{183}	—	December 14, 2001	Socorro	LINEAR	EOS	3.7 km	MPC · JPL
111410	2001 XK_{184}	—	December 14, 2001	Socorro	LINEAR	·	1.4 km	MPC · JPL
111411	2001 XR_{184}	—	December 14, 2001	Socorro	LINEAR	·	3.4 km	MPC · JPL
111412	2001 XQ_{187}	—	December 14, 2001	Socorro	LINEAR	·	3.6 km	MPC · JPL
111413	2001 XY_{187}	—	December 14, 2001	Socorro	LINEAR	·	3.5 km	MPC · JPL
111414	2001 XN_{189}	—	December 14, 2001	Socorro	LINEAR	·	4.7 km	MPC · JPL
111415	2001 XR_{190}	—	December 14, 2001	Socorro	LINEAR	·	3.6 km	MPC · JPL
111416	2001 XZ_{190}	—	December 14, 2001	Socorro	LINEAR	·	2.7 km	MPC · JPL
111417	2001 XS_{192}	—	December 14, 2001	Socorro	LINEAR	·	6.0 km	MPC · JPL
111418	2001 XY_{192}	—	December 14, 2001	Socorro	LINEAR	·	3.2 km	MPC · JPL
111419	2001 XA_{193}	—	December 14, 2001	Socorro	LINEAR	·	4.3 km	MPC · JPL
111420	2001 XK_{193}	—	December 14, 2001	Socorro	LINEAR	·	1.5 km	MPC · JPL
111421	2001 XD_{194}	—	December 14, 2001	Socorro	LINEAR	fast	5.9 km	MPC · JPL
111422	2001 XM_{196}	—	December 14, 2001	Socorro	LINEAR	·	7.7 km	MPC · JPL
111423	2001 XU_{196}	—	December 14, 2001	Socorro	LINEAR	·	1.5 km	MPC · JPL
111424	2001 XX_{198}	—	December 14, 2001	Socorro	LINEAR	·	2.3 km	MPC · JPL
111425	2001 XJ_{202}	—	December 11, 2001	Socorro	LINEAR	·	4.2 km	MPC · JPL
111426	2001 XC_{203}	—	December 11, 2001	Socorro	LINEAR	·	5.7 km	MPC · JPL
111427	2001 XH_{203}	—	December 11, 2001	Socorro	LINEAR	·	4.5 km	MPC · JPL
111428	2001 XM_{206}	—	December 11, 2001	Socorro	LINEAR	·	2.1 km	MPC · JPL
111429	2001 XN_{206}	—	December 11, 2001	Socorro	LINEAR	·	4.4 km	MPC · JPL
111430	2001 XQ_{207}	—	December 11, 2001	Socorro	LINEAR	·	3.6 km	MPC · JPL
111431	2001 XN_{208}	—	December 11, 2001	Socorro	LINEAR	EOS	4.2 km	MPC · JPL
111432	2001 XB_{209}	—	December 11, 2001	Socorro	LINEAR	EOS	3.6 km	MPC · JPL
111433	2001 XZ_{212}	—	December 11, 2001	Socorro	LINEAR	·	4.7 km	MPC · JPL
111434	2001 XQ_{215}	—	December 14, 2001	Socorro	LINEAR	·	5.3 km	MPC · JPL
111435	2001 XY_{217}	—	December 15, 2001	Socorro	LINEAR	GEF	3.5 km	MPC · JPL
111436	2001 XU_{218}	—	December 15, 2001	Socorro	LINEAR	KOR	2.5 km	MPC · JPL
111437	2001 XV_{222}	—	December 15, 2001	Socorro	LINEAR	·	3.5 km	MPC · JPL
111438	2001 XV_{223}	—	December 15, 2001	Socorro	LINEAR	·	3.5 km	MPC · JPL
111439	2001 XJ_{227}	—	December 15, 2001	Socorro	LINEAR	·	3.0 km	MPC · JPL
111440	2001 XK_{231}	—	December 15, 2001	Socorro	LINEAR	EOS	3.0 km	MPC · JPL
111441	2001 XM_{232}	—	December 15, 2001	Socorro	LINEAR	·	3.6 km	MPC · JPL
111442	2001 XX_{233}	—	December 15, 2001	Socorro	LINEAR	·	4.8 km	MPC · JPL
111443	2001 XU_{235}	—	December 15, 2001	Socorro	LINEAR	·	3.4 km	MPC · JPL
111444	2001 XZ_{235}	—	December 15, 2001	Socorro	LINEAR	·	5.4 km	MPC · JPL
111445	2001 XJ_{238}	—	December 15, 2001	Socorro	LINEAR	·	5.2 km	MPC · JPL
111446	2001 XS_{238}	—	December 15, 2001	Socorro	LINEAR	·	4.6 km	MPC · JPL
111447	2001 XL_{239}	—	December 15, 2001	Socorro	LINEAR	KOR	2.8 km	MPC · JPL
111448	2001 XA_{240}	—	December 15, 2001	Socorro	LINEAR	EOS	4.0 km	MPC · JPL
111449	2001 XG_{240}	—	December 15, 2001	Socorro	LINEAR	EOS	3.9 km	MPC · JPL
111450	2001 XH_{240}	—	December 15, 2001	Socorro	LINEAR	·	2.2 km	MPC · JPL
111451	2001 XM_{245}	—	December 15, 2001	Socorro	LINEAR	·	4.2 km	MPC · JPL
111452	2001 XJ_{246}	—	December 15, 2001	Socorro	LINEAR	·	3.8 km	MPC · JPL
111453	2001 XD_{248}	—	December 14, 2001	Palomar	NEAT	AGN	2.1 km	MPC · JPL
111454	2001 XA_{250}	—	December 14, 2001	Socorro	LINEAR	·	3.5 km	MPC · JPL
111455	2001 XL_{252}	—	December 14, 2001	Socorro	LINEAR	·	5.5 km	MPC · JPL
111456	2001 XJ_{254}	—	December 15, 2001	Socorro	LINEAR	·	4.5 km	MPC · JPL
111457	2001 XJ_{256}	—	December 7, 2001	Socorro	LINEAR	·	2.4 km	MPC · JPL
111458	2001 XP_{256}	—	December 7, 2001	Socorro	LINEAR	GEF	2.2 km	MPC · JPL
111459	2001 XQ_{256}	—	December 7, 2001	Socorro	LINEAR	·	4.1 km	MPC · JPL
111460	2001 XR_{258}	—	December 8, 2001	Anderson Mesa	LONEOS	·	3.1 km	MPC · JPL
111461	2001 XN_{259}	—	December 8, 2001	Socorro	LINEAR	SYL · CYB	7.2 km	MPC · JPL
111462	2001 XR_{259}	—	December 9, 2001	Anderson Mesa	LONEOS	HOF	4.9 km	MPC · JPL
111463	2001 XY_{259}	—	December 9, 2001	Palomar	NEAT	MRX ·	2.1 km	MPC · JPL
111464	2001 XC_{262}	—	December 12, 2001	Palomar	NEAT	KOR	2.8 km	MPC · JPL
111465	2001 XO_{263}	—	December 14, 2001	Anderson Mesa	LONEOS	·	4.8 km	MPC · JPL
111466	2001 YF_{2}	—	December 18, 2001	Needville	Needville	·	2.8 km	MPC · JPL
111467	2001 YQ_{2}	—	December 19, 2001	Fountain Hills	C. W. Juels, P. R. Holvorcem	MAR	3.5 km	MPC · JPL
111468 Alba Regia	2001 YD_{5}	Alba Regia	December 23, 2001	Piszkéstető	K. Sárneczky, Furesz, G.	·	4.1 km	MPC · JPL
111469	2001 YQ_{6}	—	December 17, 2001	Socorro	LINEAR	PAD	4.7 km	MPC · JPL
111470	2001 YE_{8}	—	December 17, 2001	Socorro	LINEAR	·	6.7 km	MPC · JPL
111471	2001 YG_{8}	—	December 17, 2001	Socorro	LINEAR	·	3.0 km	MPC · JPL
111472	2001 YO_{9}	—	December 17, 2001	Socorro	LINEAR	·	6.1 km	MPC · JPL
111473	2001 YM_{10}	—	December 17, 2001	Socorro	LINEAR	·	1.6 km	MPC · JPL
111474	2001 YH_{12}	—	December 17, 2001	Socorro	LINEAR	·	3.6 km	MPC · JPL
111475	2001 YC_{14}	—	December 17, 2001	Socorro	LINEAR	EOS	4.3 km	MPC · JPL
111476	2001 YL_{16}	—	December 17, 2001	Socorro	LINEAR	·	4.8 km	MPC · JPL
111477	2001 YX_{16}	—	December 17, 2001	Socorro	LINEAR	·	1.9 km	MPC · JPL
111478	2001 YN_{18}	—	December 17, 2001	Socorro	LINEAR	KOR	2.8 km	MPC · JPL
111479	2001 YT_{21}	—	December 18, 2001	Socorro	LINEAR	KOR	2.7 km	MPC · JPL
111480	2001 YU_{24}	—	December 18, 2001	Socorro	LINEAR	KOR	3.9 km	MPC · JPL
111481	2001 YU_{27}	—	December 18, 2001	Socorro	LINEAR	AGN	2.0 km	MPC · JPL
111482	2001 YN_{37}	—	December 18, 2001	Socorro	LINEAR	(13314)	4.7 km	MPC · JPL
111483	2001 YZ_{38}	—	December 18, 2001	Socorro	LINEAR	·	1.6 km	MPC · JPL
111484	2001 YD_{41}	—	December 18, 2001	Socorro	LINEAR	·	5.2 km	MPC · JPL
111485	2001 YF_{41}	—	December 18, 2001	Socorro	LINEAR	·	3.3 km	MPC · JPL
111486	2001 YY_{41}	—	December 18, 2001	Socorro	LINEAR	·	3.8 km	MPC · JPL
111487	2001 YV_{44}	—	December 18, 2001	Socorro	LINEAR	NYS	2.0 km	MPC · JPL
111488	2001 YT_{45}	—	December 18, 2001	Socorro	LINEAR	EOS	4.0 km	MPC · JPL
111489	2001 YH_{46}	—	December 18, 2001	Socorro	LINEAR	KOR	2.5 km	MPC · JPL
111490	2001 YO_{46}	—	December 18, 2001	Socorro	LINEAR	·	3.4 km	MPC · JPL
111491	2001 YZ_{46}	—	December 18, 2001	Socorro	LINEAR	·	4.3 km	MPC · JPL
111492	2001 YF_{51}	—	December 18, 2001	Socorro	LINEAR	·	3.6 km	MPC · JPL
111493	2001 YB_{53}	—	December 18, 2001	Socorro	LINEAR	·	3.4 km	MPC · JPL
111494	2001 YU_{53}	—	December 18, 2001	Socorro	LINEAR	·	2.8 km	MPC · JPL
111495	2001 YM_{58}	—	December 18, 2001	Socorro	LINEAR	·	4.6 km	MPC · JPL
111496	2001 YX_{58}	—	December 18, 2001	Socorro	LINEAR	·	7.2 km	MPC · JPL
111497	2001 YO_{59}	—	December 18, 2001	Socorro	LINEAR	KOR	3.0 km	MPC · JPL
111498	2001 YN_{60}	—	December 18, 2001	Socorro	LINEAR	·	2.8 km	MPC · JPL
111499	2001 YF_{61}	—	December 18, 2001	Socorro	LINEAR	·	6.5 km	MPC · JPL
111500	2001 YM_{62}	—	December 18, 2001	Socorro	LINEAR	·	3.0 km	MPC · JPL

== 111501–111600 ==
back to top

Designation			Discovery			Properties		Ref
Permanent	Provisional	Named after	Date	Site	Discoverer(s)	Category	Diam.	Ref
111501	2001 YX_{65}	—	December 18, 2001	Socorro	LINEAR	THM	7.5 km	MPC · JPL
111502	2001 YM_{69}	—	December 18, 2001	Socorro	LINEAR	·	4.8 km	MPC · JPL
111503	2001 YM_{72}	—	December 18, 2001	Socorro	LINEAR	·	8.1 km	MPC · JPL
111504	2001 YU_{72}	—	December 18, 2001	Socorro	LINEAR	·	6.9 km	MPC · JPL
111505	2001 YK_{73}	—	December 18, 2001	Socorro	LINEAR	·	3.2 km	MPC · JPL
111506	2001 YB_{74}	—	December 18, 2001	Socorro	LINEAR	·	3.2 km	MPC · JPL
111507	2001 YE_{79}	—	December 18, 2001	Socorro	LINEAR	·	5.4 km	MPC · JPL
111508	2001 YH_{79}	—	December 18, 2001	Socorro	LINEAR	·	3.9 km	MPC · JPL
111509	2001 YL_{79}	—	December 18, 2001	Socorro	LINEAR	·	5.6 km	MPC · JPL
111510	2001 YV_{80}	—	December 18, 2001	Socorro	LINEAR	·	4.0 km	MPC · JPL
111511	2001 YF_{84}	—	December 18, 2001	Socorro	LINEAR	·	4.7 km	MPC · JPL
111512	2001 YS_{85}	—	December 18, 2001	Socorro	LINEAR	·	6.0 km	MPC · JPL
111513	2001 YA_{86}	—	December 18, 2001	Socorro	LINEAR	·	4.2 km	MPC · JPL
111514	2001 YA_{87}	—	December 18, 2001	Socorro	LINEAR	EOS	3.4 km	MPC · JPL
111515	2001 YC_{91}	—	December 17, 2001	Palomar	NEAT	(22805)	7.3 km	MPC · JPL
111516	2001 YW_{91}	—	December 17, 2001	Palomar	NEAT	·	5.8 km	MPC · JPL
111517	2001 YC_{92}	—	December 18, 2001	Palomar	NEAT	·	4.0 km	MPC · JPL
111518	2001 YX_{95}	—	December 18, 2001	Palomar	NEAT	·	5.1 km	MPC · JPL
111519	2001 YJ_{98}	—	December 17, 2001	Socorro	LINEAR	·	2.8 km	MPC · JPL
111520	2001 YM_{98}	—	December 17, 2001	Socorro	LINEAR	CYB	8.4 km	MPC · JPL
111521	2001 YL_{99}	—	December 17, 2001	Socorro	LINEAR	KOR	2.8 km	MPC · JPL
111522	2001 YG_{100}	—	December 17, 2001	Socorro	LINEAR	·	3.2 km	MPC · JPL
111523	2001 YW_{100}	—	December 17, 2001	Socorro	LINEAR	slow	7.3 km	MPC · JPL
111524	2001 YT_{104}	—	December 17, 2001	Socorro	LINEAR	·	3.8 km	MPC · JPL
111525	2001 YX_{109}	—	December 18, 2001	Socorro	LINEAR	·	13 km	MPC · JPL
111526	2001 YC_{110}	—	December 18, 2001	Socorro	LINEAR	CYB	10 km	MPC · JPL
111527	2001 YR_{111}	—	December 18, 2001	Anderson Mesa	LONEOS	·	7.1 km	MPC · JPL
111528	2001 YT_{111}	—	December 19, 2001	Socorro	LINEAR	·	1.5 km	MPC · JPL
111529	2001 YH_{112}	—	December 19, 2001	Socorro	LINEAR	·	3.2 km	MPC · JPL
111530	2001 YY_{112}	—	December 19, 2001	Socorro	LINEAR	EOS	4.3 km	MPC · JPL
111531	2001 YH_{113}	—	December 19, 2001	Socorro	LINEAR	·	2.6 km	MPC · JPL
111532	2001 YL_{114}	—	December 19, 2001	Palomar	NEAT	·	3.8 km	MPC · JPL
111533	2001 YD_{116}	—	December 17, 2001	Socorro	LINEAR	·	3.3 km	MPC · JPL
111534	2001 YL_{116}	—	December 18, 2001	Socorro	LINEAR	·	4.6 km	MPC · JPL
111535	2001 YJ_{117}	—	December 18, 2001	Socorro	LINEAR	·	7.1 km	MPC · JPL
111536	2001 YW_{117}	—	December 18, 2001	Socorro	LINEAR	EUN	2.8 km	MPC · JPL
111537	2001 YD_{120}	—	December 19, 2001	Socorro	LINEAR	V	1.2 km	MPC · JPL
111538	2001 YH_{122}	—	December 17, 2001	Socorro	LINEAR	EOS	4.4 km	MPC · JPL
111539	2001 YO_{130}	—	December 17, 2001	Socorro	LINEAR	·	4.8 km	MPC · JPL
111540	2001 YL_{131}	—	December 18, 2001	Socorro	LINEAR	·	3.9 km	MPC · JPL
111541	2001 YJ_{132}	—	December 19, 2001	Socorro	LINEAR	·	6.0 km	MPC · JPL
111542	2001 YK_{133}	—	December 17, 2001	Kitt Peak	Spacewatch	·	3.1 km	MPC · JPL
111543	2001 YC_{134}	—	December 17, 2001	Socorro	LINEAR	·	5.0 km	MPC · JPL
111544	2001 YT_{134}	—	December 18, 2001	Socorro	LINEAR	·	3.2 km	MPC · JPL
111545	2001 YU_{134}	—	December 18, 2001	Socorro	LINEAR	NYS	2.3 km	MPC · JPL
111546	2001 YY_{135}	—	December 21, 2001	Socorro	LINEAR	·	4.2 km	MPC · JPL
111547	2001 YF_{136}	—	December 22, 2001	Socorro	LINEAR	·	3.7 km	MPC · JPL
111548	2001 YG_{136}	—	December 22, 2001	Socorro	LINEAR	MAR	3.3 km	MPC · JPL
111549	2001 YC_{137}	—	December 22, 2001	Socorro	LINEAR	·	3.2 km	MPC · JPL
111550	2001 YO_{137}	—	December 22, 2001	Socorro	LINEAR	·	6.1 km	MPC · JPL
111551	2001 YT_{137}	—	December 22, 2001	Socorro	LINEAR	·	5.4 km	MPC · JPL
111552	2001 YO_{140}	—	December 22, 2001	Socorro	LINEAR	·	3.5 km	MPC · JPL
111553	2001 YQ_{140}	—	December 22, 2001	Socorro	LINEAR	EOS	4.0 km	MPC · JPL
111554	2001 YA_{141}	—	December 17, 2001	Socorro	LINEAR	NEM	4.2 km	MPC · JPL
111555	2001 YR_{153}	—	December 19, 2001	Palomar	NEAT	·	8.5 km	MPC · JPL
111556	2001 YC_{155}	—	December 20, 2001	Palomar	NEAT	MAR	2.0 km	MPC · JPL
111557	2001 YN_{155}	—	December 20, 2001	Palomar	NEAT	·	8.6 km	MPC · JPL
111558 Barrett	2002 AZ	Barrett	January 6, 2002	Desert Moon	Stevens, B. L.	(43176)	5.9 km	MPC · JPL
111559	2002 AN_{2}	—	January 5, 2002	Socorro	LINEAR	·	9.7 km	MPC · JPL
111560	2002 AX_{2}	—	January 6, 2002	Socorro	LINEAR	H	1.8 km	MPC · JPL
111561 Giovanniallevi	2002 AH_{3}	Giovanniallevi	January 5, 2002	Cima Ekar	ADAS	GEF	2.2 km	MPC · JPL
111562	2002 AJ_{3}	—	January 5, 2002	Cima Ekar	ADAS	·	4.1 km	MPC · JPL
111563	2002 AC_{4}	—	January 5, 2002	Socorro	LINEAR	·	7.5 km	MPC · JPL
111564	2002 AN_{4}	—	January 8, 2002	Socorro	LINEAR	H	1.1 km	MPC · JPL
111565	2002 AP_{4}	—	January 8, 2002	Črni Vrh	Mikuž, H.	HYG	6.7 km	MPC · JPL
111566	2002 AL_{6}	—	January 6, 2002	Socorro	LINEAR	·	4.7 km	MPC · JPL
111567	2002 AT_{6}	—	January 5, 2002	Cima Ekar	ADAS	EOS	3.6 km	MPC · JPL
111568	2002 AS_{9}	—	January 11, 2002	Desert Eagle	W. K. Y. Yeung	·	1.7 km	MPC · JPL
111569	2002 AU_{10}	—	January 6, 2002	Haleakala	NEAT	·	2.0 km	MPC · JPL
111570 Ágasvár	2002 AG_{11}	Ágasvár	January 11, 2002	Piszkéstető	K. Sárneczky, Z. Heiner	·	4.7 km	MPC · JPL
111571 Bebevio	2002 AD_{13}	Bebevio	January 11, 2002	Campo Imperatore	F. Bernardi, M. Tombelli	L4	10 km	MPC · JPL
111572	2002 AQ_{13}	—	January 11, 2002	Desert Eagle	W. K. Y. Yeung	V	1.6 km	MPC · JPL
111573	2002 AV_{15}	—	January 4, 2002	Haleakala	NEAT	·	7.4 km	MPC · JPL
111574	2002 AV_{16}	—	January 5, 2002	Haleakala	NEAT	·	5.0 km	MPC · JPL
111575	2002 AK_{20}	—	January 5, 2002	Haleakala	NEAT	KOR	2.4 km	MPC · JPL
111576	2002 AQ_{20}	—	January 6, 2002	Haleakala	NEAT	·	5.4 km	MPC · JPL
111577	2002 AY_{24}	—	January 8, 2002	Palomar	NEAT	·	3.3 km	MPC · JPL
111578	2002 AP_{27}	—	January 7, 2002	Anderson Mesa	LONEOS	·	7.2 km	MPC · JPL
111579	2002 AT_{27}	—	January 7, 2002	Anderson Mesa	LONEOS	·	3.6 km	MPC · JPL
111580	2002 AY_{32}	—	January 12, 2002	Palomar	NEAT	·	2.0 km	MPC · JPL
111581	2002 AE_{37}	—	January 9, 2002	Socorro	LINEAR	·	7.6 km	MPC · JPL
111582	2002 AG_{38}	—	January 9, 2002	Socorro	LINEAR	EOS	5.4 km	MPC · JPL
111583	2002 AV_{40}	—	January 9, 2002	Socorro	LINEAR	·	1.4 km	MPC · JPL
111584	2002 AJ_{41}	—	January 9, 2002	Socorro	LINEAR	EOS	3.9 km	MPC · JPL
111585	2002 AO_{41}	—	January 9, 2002	Socorro	LINEAR	VER	8.4 km	MPC · JPL
111586	2002 AR_{42}	—	January 9, 2002	Socorro	LINEAR	URS	5.8 km	MPC · JPL
111587	2002 AL_{49}	—	January 9, 2002	Socorro	LINEAR	MAS	1.7 km	MPC · JPL
111588	2002 AO_{49}	—	January 9, 2002	Socorro	LINEAR	·	5.1 km	MPC · JPL
111589	2002 AX_{55}	—	January 9, 2002	Socorro	LINEAR	·	2.9 km	MPC · JPL
111590	2002 AX_{56}	—	January 9, 2002	Socorro	LINEAR	THM	3.6 km	MPC · JPL
111591	2002 AJ_{58}	—	January 9, 2002	Socorro	LINEAR	THM	4.7 km	MPC · JPL
111592	2002 AY_{63}	—	January 11, 2002	Socorro	LINEAR	·	7.2 km	MPC · JPL
111593	2002 AO_{65}	—	January 11, 2002	Socorro	LINEAR	·	7.2 km	MPC · JPL
111594 Ráktanya	2002 AX_{66}	Ráktanya	January 11, 2002	Piszkéstető	K. Sárneczky, Z. Heiner	NYS	1.7 km	MPC · JPL
111595	2002 AK_{69}	—	January 13, 2002	Needville	Needville	DOR	3.7 km	MPC · JPL
111596	2002 AN_{71}	—	January 8, 2002	Socorro	LINEAR	·	1.9 km	MPC · JPL
111597	2002 AA_{75}	—	January 8, 2002	Socorro	LINEAR	·	3.6 km	MPC · JPL
111598	2002 AC_{79}	—	January 8, 2002	Socorro	LINEAR	·	2.8 km	MPC · JPL
111599	2002 AH_{79}	—	January 8, 2002	Socorro	LINEAR	·	2.0 km	MPC · JPL
111600	2002 AC_{80}	—	January 8, 2002	Socorro	LINEAR	·	1.7 km	MPC · JPL

== 111601–111700 ==
back to top

Designation			Discovery			Properties		Ref
Permanent	Provisional	Named after	Date	Site	Discoverer(s)	Category	Diam.	Ref
111601	2002 AH_{80}	—	January 8, 2002	Socorro	LINEAR	·	3.3 km	MPC · JPL
111602	2002 AP_{81}	—	January 9, 2002	Socorro	LINEAR	·	3.7 km	MPC · JPL
111603	2002 AA_{86}	—	January 9, 2002	Socorro	LINEAR	·	5.6 km	MPC · JPL
111604	2002 AG_{86}	—	January 9, 2002	Socorro	LINEAR	EOS	4.0 km	MPC · JPL
111605	2002 AF_{88}	—	January 9, 2002	Socorro	LINEAR	·	3.4 km	MPC · JPL
111606	2002 AS_{88}	—	January 9, 2002	Socorro	LINEAR	·	6.1 km	MPC · JPL
111607	2002 AE_{89}	—	January 9, 2002	Socorro	LINEAR	·	8.4 km	MPC · JPL
111608	2002 AL_{93}	—	January 8, 2002	Socorro	LINEAR	·	5.8 km	MPC · JPL
111609	2002 AS_{94}	—	January 8, 2002	Socorro	LINEAR	THM	4.9 km	MPC · JPL
111610	2002 AV_{102}	—	January 8, 2002	Socorro	LINEAR	KOR	2.7 km	MPC · JPL
111611	2002 AD_{107}	—	January 9, 2002	Socorro	LINEAR	·	1.8 km	MPC · JPL
111612	2002 AG_{107}	—	January 9, 2002	Socorro	LINEAR	·	4.5 km	MPC · JPL
111613	2002 AJ_{107}	—	January 9, 2002	Socorro	LINEAR	V	1.2 km	MPC · JPL
111614	2002 AC_{109}	—	January 9, 2002	Socorro	LINEAR	(1118)	8.0 km	MPC · JPL
111615	2002 AN_{110}	—	January 9, 2002	Socorro	LINEAR	·	4.1 km	MPC · JPL
111616	2002 AV_{111}	—	January 9, 2002	Socorro	LINEAR	·	1.6 km	MPC · JPL
111617	2002 AV_{112}	—	January 9, 2002	Socorro	LINEAR	URS	8.0 km	MPC · JPL
111618	2002 AR_{114}	—	January 9, 2002	Socorro	LINEAR	fast	7.7 km	MPC · JPL
111619	2002 AV_{115}	—	January 9, 2002	Socorro	LINEAR	·	1.8 km	MPC · JPL
111620	2002 AQ_{116}	—	January 9, 2002	Socorro	LINEAR	RAF	2.3 km	MPC · JPL
111621	2002 AQ_{118}	—	January 9, 2002	Socorro	LINEAR	·	6.1 km	MPC · JPL
111622	2002 AV_{118}	—	January 9, 2002	Socorro	LINEAR	·	1.6 km	MPC · JPL
111623	2002 AK_{120}	—	January 9, 2002	Socorro	LINEAR	·	4.9 km	MPC · JPL
111624	2002 AL_{125}	—	January 11, 2002	Socorro	LINEAR	NYS	1.8 km	MPC · JPL
111625	2002 AX_{127}	—	January 13, 2002	Socorro	LINEAR	THM	4.5 km	MPC · JPL
111626	2002 AK_{128}	—	January 14, 2002	Desert Eagle	W. K. Y. Yeung	·	1.7 km	MPC · JPL
111627	2002 AF_{129}	—	January 14, 2002	Socorro	LINEAR	H	1.1 km	MPC · JPL
111628	2002 AQ_{131}	—	January 8, 2002	Socorro	LINEAR	H	1.6 km	MPC · JPL
111629	2002 AZ_{137}	—	January 9, 2002	Socorro	LINEAR	·	5.1 km	MPC · JPL
111630	2002 AL_{138}	—	January 9, 2002	Socorro	LINEAR	·	4.6 km	MPC · JPL
111631	2002 AT_{141}	—	January 13, 2002	Socorro	LINEAR	·	1.8 km	MPC · JPL
111632	2002 AB_{142}	—	January 13, 2002	Socorro	LINEAR	·	1.9 km	MPC · JPL
111633	2002 AQ_{147}	—	January 14, 2002	Socorro	LINEAR	·	6.1 km	MPC · JPL
111634	2002 AU_{147}	—	January 14, 2002	Socorro	LINEAR	·	4.1 km	MPC · JPL
111635	2002 AV_{149}	—	January 14, 2002	Socorro	LINEAR	EOS	4.0 km	MPC · JPL
111636	2002 AB_{151}	—	January 14, 2002	Socorro	LINEAR	·	4.4 km	MPC · JPL
111637	2002 AT_{151}	—	January 14, 2002	Socorro	LINEAR	·	4.1 km	MPC · JPL
111638	2002 AQ_{154}	—	January 14, 2002	Socorro	LINEAR	EOS	4.1 km	MPC · JPL
111639	2002 AZ_{157}	—	January 13, 2002	Socorro	LINEAR	EOS	3.8 km	MPC · JPL
111640	2002 AH_{158}	—	January 13, 2002	Socorro	LINEAR	·	4.2 km	MPC · JPL
111641	2002 AD_{167}	—	January 13, 2002	Socorro	LINEAR	·	1.4 km	MPC · JPL
111642	2002 AE_{167}	—	January 13, 2002	Socorro	LINEAR	DOR	4.3 km	MPC · JPL
111643	2002 AP_{169}	—	January 14, 2002	Socorro	LINEAR	·	6.5 km	MPC · JPL
111644	2002 AJ_{170}	—	January 14, 2002	Socorro	LINEAR	THM	4.1 km	MPC · JPL
111645	2002 AK_{170}	—	January 14, 2002	Socorro	LINEAR	THM	5.9 km	MPC · JPL
111646	2002 AH_{174}	—	January 14, 2002	Socorro	LINEAR	(7744)	2.2 km	MPC · JPL
111647	2002 AR_{179}	—	January 14, 2002	Socorro	LINEAR	·	5.2 km	MPC · JPL
111648	2002 AR_{180}	—	January 5, 2002	Palomar	NEAT	·	3.6 km	MPC · JPL
111649	2002 AS_{180}	—	January 5, 2002	Palomar	NEAT	·	4.9 km	MPC · JPL
111650	2002 AZ_{182}	—	January 5, 2002	Haleakala	NEAT	·	7.4 km	MPC · JPL
111651	2002 AM_{183}	—	January 6, 2002	Palomar	NEAT	MRX	1.8 km	MPC · JPL
111652	2002 AA_{184}	—	January 6, 2002	Kitt Peak	Spacewatch	·	3.4 km	MPC · JPL
111653	2002 AE_{184}	—	January 7, 2002	Anderson Mesa	LONEOS	·	3.6 km	MPC · JPL
111654	2002 AG_{184}	—	January 7, 2002	Anderson Mesa	LONEOS	·	7.0 km	MPC · JPL
111655	2002 AR_{185}	—	January 8, 2002	Socorro	LINEAR	·	1.4 km	MPC · JPL
111656	2002 AP_{186}	—	January 8, 2002	Socorro	LINEAR	·	3.5 km	MPC · JPL
111657	2002 AO_{187}	—	January 8, 2002	Socorro	LINEAR	·	7.2 km	MPC · JPL
111658	2002 AP_{192}	—	January 12, 2002	Kitt Peak	Spacewatch	·	5.0 km	MPC · JPL
111659	2002 AU_{201}	—	January 8, 2002	Socorro	LINEAR	V	1.2 km	MPC · JPL
111660 Jimgray	2002 AP_{205}	Jimgray	January 13, 2002	Apache Point	SDSS	·	5.5 km	MPC · JPL
111661 Mamiegeorge	2002 BP	Mamiegeorge	January 16, 2002	Needville	Dillon, W. G., J. Dellinger	H	1.2 km	MPC · JPL
111662	2002 BN_{3}	—	January 20, 2002	Anderson Mesa	LONEOS	·	4.5 km	MPC · JPL
111663	2002 BS_{4}	—	January 19, 2002	Anderson Mesa	LONEOS	·	6.6 km	MPC · JPL
111664	2002 BT_{4}	—	January 19, 2002	Anderson Mesa	LONEOS	H	1.3 km	MPC · JPL
111665	2002 BC_{5}	—	January 19, 2002	Anderson Mesa	LONEOS	·	7.5 km	MPC · JPL
111666	2002 BX_{5}	—	January 18, 2002	Socorro	LINEAR	·	6.2 km	MPC · JPL
111667	2002 BH_{7}	—	January 18, 2002	Socorro	LINEAR	·	4.0 km	MPC · JPL
111668	2002 BU_{9}	—	January 18, 2002	Socorro	LINEAR	NYS	2.5 km	MPC · JPL
111669	2002 BE_{11}	—	January 18, 2002	Socorro	LINEAR	·	6.8 km	MPC · JPL
111670	2002 BH_{13}	—	January 18, 2002	Socorro	LINEAR	EOS	3.5 km	MPC · JPL
111671	2002 BK_{13}	—	January 18, 2002	Socorro	LINEAR	V	1.3 km	MPC · JPL
111672	2002 BN_{13}	—	January 18, 2002	Socorro	LINEAR	VER	5.4 km	MPC · JPL
111673	2002 BV_{14}	—	January 19, 2002	Socorro	LINEAR	·	6.7 km	MPC · JPL
111674	2002 BS_{19}	—	January 21, 2002	Palomar	NEAT	HYG	5.2 km	MPC · JPL
111675	2002 BG_{21}	—	January 25, 2002	Socorro	LINEAR	H	1.6 km	MPC · JPL
111676	2002 BJ_{21}	—	January 25, 2002	Socorro	LINEAR	T_{j} (2.94)	5.0 km	MPC · JPL
111677	2002 BO_{21}	—	January 25, 2002	Socorro	LINEAR	·	7.8 km	MPC · JPL
111678	2002 BQ_{21}	—	January 25, 2002	Socorro	LINEAR	PHO	2.6 km	MPC · JPL
111679	2002 BS_{21}	—	January 25, 2002	Socorro	LINEAR	H	920 m	MPC · JPL
111680	2002 BW_{22}	—	January 23, 2002	Socorro	LINEAR	EUN	3.3 km	MPC · JPL
111681	2002 BC_{23}	—	January 23, 2002	Socorro	LINEAR	·	2.7 km	MPC · JPL
111682	2002 BJ_{23}	—	January 23, 2002	Socorro	LINEAR	·	7.0 km	MPC · JPL
111683	2002 BY_{23}	—	January 23, 2002	Socorro	LINEAR	EOS	5.5 km	MPC · JPL
111684	2002 BD_{24}	—	January 23, 2002	Socorro	LINEAR	·	4.9 km	MPC · JPL
111685	2002 BT_{27}	—	January 20, 2002	Anderson Mesa	LONEOS	·	2.3 km	MPC · JPL
111686	2002 BQ_{30}	—	January 21, 2002	Anderson Mesa	LONEOS	ARM	6.8 km	MPC · JPL
111687	2002 CA	—	February 1, 2002	Socorro	LINEAR	HNS	3.9 km	MPC · JPL
111688	2002 CY_{4}	—	February 3, 2002	Palomar	NEAT	·	2.6 km	MPC · JPL
111689	2002 CZ_{5}	—	February 4, 2002	Haleakala	NEAT	·	7.0 km	MPC · JPL
111690	2002 CO_{6}	—	February 1, 2002	Socorro	LINEAR	EUP	9.6 km	MPC · JPL
111691	2002 CV_{9}	—	February 6, 2002	Socorro	LINEAR	H	1.3 km	MPC · JPL
111692	2002 CW_{9}	—	February 6, 2002	Socorro	LINEAR	H	1.1 km	MPC · JPL
111693	2002 CD_{10}	—	February 6, 2002	Socorro	LINEAR	H	1.4 km	MPC · JPL
111694	2002 CP_{10}	—	February 6, 2002	Socorro	LINEAR	H	1.2 km	MPC · JPL
111695	2002 CZ_{13}	—	February 8, 2002	Desert Eagle	W. K. Y. Yeung	·	1.6 km	MPC · JPL
111696 Helenorman	2002 CU_{14}	Helenorman	February 8, 2002	Needville	Needville	·	4.2 km	MPC · JPL
111697	2002 CD_{15}	—	February 9, 2002	Desert Eagle	W. K. Y. Yeung	·	4.1 km	MPC · JPL
111698	2002 CE_{15}	—	February 9, 2002	Desert Eagle	W. K. Y. Yeung	·	4.7 km	MPC · JPL
111699	2002 CP_{15}	—	February 8, 2002	Fountain Hills	C. W. Juels, P. R. Holvorcem	·	4.6 km	MPC · JPL
111700	2002 CN_{18}	—	February 6, 2002	Socorro	LINEAR	EOS	4.3 km	MPC · JPL

== 111701–111800 ==
back to top

Designation			Discovery			Properties		Ref
Permanent	Provisional	Named after	Date	Site	Discoverer(s)	Category	Diam.	Ref
111701	2002 CE_{20}	—	February 4, 2002	Palomar	NEAT	·	5.0 km	MPC · JPL
111702	2002 CE_{22}	—	February 5, 2002	Palomar	NEAT	·	6.0 km	MPC · JPL
111703	2002 CZ_{22}	—	February 5, 2002	Palomar	NEAT	·	4.9 km	MPC · JPL
111704	2002 CQ_{24}	—	February 6, 2002	Haleakala	NEAT	·	8.0 km	MPC · JPL
111705	2002 CM_{25}	—	February 7, 2002	Socorro	LINEAR	·	1.5 km	MPC · JPL
111706	2002 CH_{26}	—	February 6, 2002	Socorro	LINEAR	EUN	4.1 km	MPC · JPL
111707	2002 CL_{26}	—	February 6, 2002	Socorro	LINEAR	BRA	3.5 km	MPC · JPL
111708	2002 CP_{26}	—	February 6, 2002	Socorro	LINEAR	EUN	3.4 km	MPC · JPL
111709	2002 CV_{26}	—	February 6, 2002	Socorro	LINEAR	·	8.2 km	MPC · JPL
111710	2002 CP_{27}	—	February 6, 2002	Socorro	LINEAR	(1338) (FLO)	980 m	MPC · JPL
111711	2002 CT_{27}	—	February 6, 2002	Socorro	LINEAR	·	1.9 km	MPC · JPL
111712	2002 CV_{29}	—	February 6, 2002	Socorro	LINEAR	V	1.1 km	MPC · JPL
111713	2002 CX_{33}	—	February 6, 2002	Socorro	LINEAR	VER	5.4 km	MPC · JPL
111714	2002 CM_{34}	—	February 6, 2002	Socorro	LINEAR	·	6.0 km	MPC · JPL
111715	2002 CO_{34}	—	February 6, 2002	Socorro	LINEAR	EOS	5.0 km	MPC · JPL
111716	2002 CG_{35}	—	February 6, 2002	Socorro	LINEAR	·	7.0 km	MPC · JPL
111717	2002 CE_{36}	—	February 7, 2002	Socorro	LINEAR	·	1.6 km	MPC · JPL
111718	2002 CJ_{38}	—	February 7, 2002	Socorro	LINEAR	·	3.4 km	MPC · JPL
111719	2002 CR_{38}	—	February 7, 2002	Socorro	LINEAR	·	5.3 km	MPC · JPL
111720	2002 CU_{41}	—	February 7, 2002	Haleakala	NEAT	·	3.8 km	MPC · JPL
111721	2002 CN_{42}	—	February 7, 2002	Haleakala	NEAT	EUN	2.3 km	MPC · JPL
111722	2002 CF_{43}	—	February 12, 2002	Fountain Hills	C. W. Juels, P. R. Holvorcem	·	2.7 km	MPC · JPL
111723	2002 CV_{45}	—	February 8, 2002	Palomar	NEAT	·	7.7 km	MPC · JPL
111724	2002 CC_{48}	—	February 3, 2002	Haleakala	NEAT	·	2.6 km	MPC · JPL
111725	2002 CE_{50}	—	February 3, 2002	Haleakala	NEAT	·	6.9 km	MPC · JPL
111726	2002 CH_{50}	—	February 11, 2002	Desert Eagle	W. K. Y. Yeung	·	1.8 km	MPC · JPL
111727	2002 CR_{50}	—	February 12, 2002	Desert Eagle	W. K. Y. Yeung	·	4.6 km	MPC · JPL
111728	2002 CZ_{51}	—	February 12, 2002	Desert Eagle	W. K. Y. Yeung	·	1.2 km	MPC · JPL
111729	2002 CX_{52}	—	February 7, 2002	Socorro	LINEAR	·	6.1 km	MPC · JPL
111730	2002 CR_{56}	—	February 7, 2002	Socorro	LINEAR	·	1.5 km	MPC · JPL
111731	2002 CY_{57}	—	February 8, 2002	Socorro	LINEAR	·	5.7 km	MPC · JPL
111732	2002 CW_{60}	—	February 6, 2002	Socorro	LINEAR	·	1.9 km	MPC · JPL
111733	2002 CB_{61}	—	February 6, 2002	Socorro	LINEAR	V	1.4 km	MPC · JPL
111734	2002 CB_{65}	—	February 6, 2002	Socorro	LINEAR	·	3.7 km	MPC · JPL
111735	2002 CT_{74}	—	February 7, 2002	Socorro	LINEAR	·	6.8 km	MPC · JPL
111736	2002 CH_{76}	—	February 7, 2002	Socorro	LINEAR	L4	12 km	MPC · JPL
111737	2002 CN_{77}	—	February 7, 2002	Socorro	LINEAR	·	1.4 km	MPC · JPL
111738	2002 CY_{78}	—	February 7, 2002	Socorro	LINEAR	URS	6.6 km	MPC · JPL
111739	2002 CB_{84}	—	February 7, 2002	Socorro	LINEAR	THM	4.9 km	MPC · JPL
111740	2002 CD_{85}	—	February 7, 2002	Socorro	LINEAR	·	7.0 km	MPC · JPL
111741	2002 CL_{85}	—	February 7, 2002	Socorro	LINEAR	·	1.3 km	MPC · JPL
111742	2002 CR_{86}	—	February 7, 2002	Socorro	LINEAR	HYG	6.0 km	MPC · JPL
111743	2002 CA_{94}	—	February 7, 2002	Socorro	LINEAR	HIL · 3:2	14 km	MPC · JPL
111744	2002 CY_{99}	—	February 7, 2002	Socorro	LINEAR	·	2.0 km	MPC · JPL
111745	2002 CA_{103}	—	February 7, 2002	Socorro	LINEAR	·	7.0 km	MPC · JPL
111746	2002 CE_{107}	—	February 7, 2002	Socorro	LINEAR	NYS ·	2.1 km	MPC · JPL
111747	2002 CZ_{108}	—	February 7, 2002	Socorro	LINEAR	·	7.4 km	MPC · JPL
111748	2002 CE_{112}	—	February 7, 2002	Socorro	LINEAR	·	1.5 km	MPC · JPL
111749	2002 CK_{113}	—	February 8, 2002	Socorro	LINEAR	·	4.7 km	MPC · JPL
111750	2002 CR_{113}	—	February 8, 2002	Socorro	LINEAR	·	1.5 km	MPC · JPL
111751	2002 CU_{114}	—	February 8, 2002	Socorro	LINEAR	·	980 m	MPC · JPL
111752	2002 CO_{115}	—	February 8, 2002	Needville	Needville	·	2.8 km	MPC · JPL
111753	2002 CE_{116}	—	February 13, 2002	Socorro	LINEAR	H	1.3 km	MPC · JPL
111754	2002 CJ_{119}	—	February 7, 2002	Socorro	LINEAR	·	4.2 km	MPC · JPL
111755	2002 CK_{119}	—	February 7, 2002	Socorro	LINEAR	·	3.0 km	MPC · JPL
111756	2002 CE_{121}	—	February 7, 2002	Socorro	LINEAR	·	6.6 km	MPC · JPL
111757	2002 CX_{121}	—	February 7, 2002	Socorro	LINEAR	·	4.2 km	MPC · JPL
111758	2002 CR_{125}	—	February 7, 2002	Socorro	LINEAR	·	2.4 km	MPC · JPL
111759	2002 CK_{126}	—	February 7, 2002	Socorro	LINEAR	DOR	5.2 km	MPC · JPL
111760	2002 CT_{127}	—	February 7, 2002	Socorro	LINEAR	·	3.2 km	MPC · JPL
111761	2002 CZ_{130}	—	February 7, 2002	Socorro	LINEAR	·	6.4 km	MPC · JPL
111762	2002 CL_{131}	—	February 7, 2002	Socorro	LINEAR	·	7.2 km	MPC · JPL
111763	2002 CR_{132}	—	February 7, 2002	Socorro	LINEAR	NYS	2.4 km	MPC · JPL
111764	2002 CO_{134}	—	February 7, 2002	Socorro	LINEAR	·	3.3 km	MPC · JPL
111765	2002 CF_{136}	—	February 8, 2002	Socorro	LINEAR	·	5.8 km	MPC · JPL
111766	2002 CO_{139}	—	February 8, 2002	Socorro	LINEAR	·	2.1 km	MPC · JPL
111767	2002 CB_{140}	—	February 8, 2002	Socorro	LINEAR	DOR	3.6 km	MPC · JPL
111768	2002 CY_{144}	—	February 9, 2002	Socorro	LINEAR	·	1.3 km	MPC · JPL
111769	2002 CQ_{152}	—	February 8, 2002	Socorro	LINEAR	H	1.1 km	MPC · JPL
111770	2002 CY_{152}	—	February 11, 2002	Socorro	LINEAR	L4	10 km	MPC · JPL
111771	2002 CZ_{152}	—	February 11, 2002	Socorro	LINEAR	L4	10 km	MPC · JPL
111772	2002 CB_{153}	—	February 6, 2002	Socorro	LINEAR	H	1.1 km	MPC · JPL
111773	2002 CX_{153}	—	February 9, 2002	Kitt Peak	Spacewatch	THM	3.8 km	MPC · JPL
111774	2002 CK_{159}	—	February 7, 2002	Socorro	LINEAR	·	1.2 km	MPC · JPL
111775	2002 CD_{161}	—	February 8, 2002	Socorro	LINEAR	HYG	6.2 km	MPC · JPL
111776	2002 CX_{164}	—	February 8, 2002	Socorro	LINEAR	·	6.3 km	MPC · JPL
111777	2002 CG_{166}	—	February 8, 2002	Socorro	LINEAR	·	2.8 km	MPC · JPL
111778	2002 CR_{166}	—	February 8, 2002	Socorro	LINEAR	HYG	5.4 km	MPC · JPL
111779	2002 CD_{168}	—	February 8, 2002	Socorro	LINEAR	·	1.6 km	MPC · JPL
111780	2002 CR_{174}	—	February 8, 2002	Socorro	LINEAR	·	2.4 km	MPC · JPL
111781	2002 CF_{175}	—	February 10, 2002	Socorro	LINEAR	DOR	4.1 km	MPC · JPL
111782	2002 CK_{176}	—	February 10, 2002	Socorro	LINEAR	·	3.6 km	MPC · JPL
111783	2002 CJ_{181}	—	February 10, 2002	Socorro	LINEAR	·	2.7 km	MPC · JPL
111784	2002 CO_{186}	—	February 10, 2002	Socorro	LINEAR	·	1.4 km	MPC · JPL
111785	2002 CQ_{186}	—	February 10, 2002	Socorro	LINEAR	L4	10 km	MPC · JPL
111786	2002 CZ_{213}	—	February 10, 2002	Socorro	LINEAR	·	1.1 km	MPC · JPL
111787	2002 CM_{216}	—	February 10, 2002	Socorro	LINEAR	·	4.2 km	MPC · JPL
111788	2002 CR_{235}	—	February 8, 2002	Socorro	LINEAR	·	1.9 km	MPC · JPL
111789	2002 CQ_{236}	—	February 8, 2002	Socorro	LINEAR	ERI	4.0 km	MPC · JPL
111790	2002 CQ_{238}	—	February 11, 2002	Socorro	LINEAR	·	2.2 km	MPC · JPL
111791	2002 CJ_{239}	—	February 11, 2002	Socorro	LINEAR	·	2.7 km	MPC · JPL
111792	2002 CR_{239}	—	February 11, 2002	Socorro	LINEAR	·	1.3 km	MPC · JPL
111793	2002 CG_{240}	—	February 11, 2002	Socorro	LINEAR	·	1.7 km	MPC · JPL
111794	2002 CK_{240}	—	February 11, 2002	Socorro	LINEAR	·	2.2 km	MPC · JPL
111795	2002 CX_{240}	—	February 11, 2002	Socorro	LINEAR	·	5.3 km	MPC · JPL
111796	2002 CS_{241}	—	February 11, 2002	Socorro	LINEAR	·	2.1 km	MPC · JPL
111797	2002 CK_{242}	—	February 11, 2002	Socorro	LINEAR	·	2.5 km	MPC · JPL
111798	2002 CW_{242}	—	February 11, 2002	Socorro	LINEAR	LUT	6.7 km	MPC · JPL
111799	2002 CB_{244}	—	February 11, 2002	Socorro	LINEAR	NYS	1.7 km	MPC · JPL
111800	2002 CT_{244}	—	February 11, 2002	Socorro	LINEAR	·	2.0 km	MPC · JPL

== 111801–111900 ==
back to top

Designation			Discovery			Properties		Ref
Permanent	Provisional	Named after	Date	Site	Discoverer(s)	Category	Diam.	Ref
111801	2002 CZ_{245}	—	February 15, 2002	Haleakala	NEAT	·	6.6 km	MPC · JPL
111802	2002 CA_{248}	—	February 15, 2002	Socorro	LINEAR	THM · fast	5.2 km	MPC · JPL
111803	2002 CH_{248}	—	February 15, 2002	Socorro	LINEAR	·	1.6 km	MPC · JPL
111804	2002 CE_{256}	—	February 4, 2002	Palomar	NEAT	·	5.2 km	MPC · JPL
111805	2002 CZ_{256}	—	February 4, 2002	Palomar	NEAT	L4 · ERY	20 km	MPC · JPL
111806	2002 CP_{270}	—	February 7, 2002	Kitt Peak	Spacewatch	L4	10 km	MPC · JPL
111807	2002 CC_{273}	—	February 8, 2002	Anderson Mesa	LONEOS	·	1.9 km	MPC · JPL
111808	2002 CE_{273}	—	February 8, 2002	Anderson Mesa	LONEOS	·	1.6 km	MPC · JPL
111809	2002 CF_{274}	—	February 8, 2002	Socorro	LINEAR	·	2.8 km	MPC · JPL
111810	2002 CT_{276}	—	February 7, 2002	Socorro	LINEAR	·	1.4 km	MPC · JPL
111811	2002 CN_{283}	—	February 8, 2002	Socorro	LINEAR	·	2.7 km	MPC · JPL
111812	2002 CW_{289}	—	February 10, 2002	Socorro	LINEAR	·	5.2 km	MPC · JPL
111813	2002 CF_{296}	—	February 10, 2002	Socorro	LINEAR	BRA	2.5 km	MPC · JPL
111814	2002 CW_{299}	—	February 10, 2002	Kvistaberg	Uppsala-DLR Asteroid Survey	KOR	2.2 km	MPC · JPL
111815	2002 CS_{303}	—	February 13, 2002	Kitt Peak	Spacewatch	·	4.6 km	MPC · JPL
111816	2002 CL_{304}	—	February 15, 2002	Socorro	LINEAR	·	3.7 km	MPC · JPL
111817	2002 DF	—	February 16, 2002	Farpoint	G. Hug	·	5.6 km	MPC · JPL
111818 Deforest	2002 DT	Deforest	February 17, 2002	Needville	J. Dellinger, Dillon, W. G.	·	5.6 km	MPC · JPL
111819	2002 DD_{1}	—	February 16, 2002	Uccle	T. Pauwels	L4	19 km	MPC · JPL
111820	2002 DK_{1}	—	February 18, 2002	Cima Ekar	ADAS	·	5.8 km	MPC · JPL
111821	2002 DS_{2}	—	February 19, 2002	Socorro	LINEAR	H	1.2 km	MPC · JPL
111822	2002 DW_{2}	—	February 17, 2002	Cordell-Lorenz	D. T. Durig	·	3.5 km	MPC · JPL
111823	2002 DE_{3}	—	February 19, 2002	Socorro	LINEAR	H	970 m	MPC · JPL
111824	2002 DS_{3}	—	February 22, 2002	Socorro	LINEAR	H	1.3 km	MPC · JPL
111825	2002 DJ_{15}	—	February 16, 2002	Palomar	NEAT	·	5.6 km	MPC · JPL
111826	2002 DB_{19}	—	February 22, 2002	Palomar	NEAT	V	1.3 km	MPC · JPL
111827	2002 ED_{1}	—	March 5, 2002	Socorro	LINEAR	GAL	3.3 km	MPC · JPL
111828	2002 EV_{1}	—	March 5, 2002	Socorro	LINEAR	H	1.1 km	MPC · JPL
111829	2002 EA_{6}	—	March 12, 2002	Črni Vrh	Mikuž, H.	V	1.0 km	MPC · JPL
111830	2002 EO_{9}	—	March 14, 2002	Prescott	P. G. Comba	·	1.2 km	MPC · JPL
111831	2002 EB_{10}	—	March 14, 2002	Socorro	LINEAR	H	2.3 km	MPC · JPL
111832	2002 EU_{10}	—	March 13, 2002	Socorro	LINEAR	H	1.2 km	MPC · JPL
111833	2002 EN_{12}	—	March 14, 2002	Desert Eagle	W. K. Y. Yeung	·	1.4 km	MPC · JPL
111834	2002 EK_{13}	—	March 5, 2002	Socorro	LINEAR	·	5.1 km	MPC · JPL
111835	2002 EL_{16}	—	March 6, 2002	Palomar	NEAT	H	830 m	MPC · JPL
111836	2002 ET_{20}	—	March 9, 2002	Socorro	LINEAR	·	1.6 km	MPC · JPL
111837	2002 EW_{20}	—	March 9, 2002	Socorro	LINEAR	·	1.5 km	MPC · JPL
111838	2002 EX_{20}	—	March 10, 2002	Palomar	NEAT	·	2.3 km	MPC · JPL
111839	2002 EU_{21}	—	March 10, 2002	Haleakala	NEAT	·	2.8 km	MPC · JPL
111840	2002 EA_{22}	—	March 10, 2002	Haleakala	NEAT	·	1.8 km	MPC · JPL
111841	2002 EU_{26}	—	March 10, 2002	Anderson Mesa	LONEOS	·	1.4 km	MPC · JPL
111842	2002 EA_{29}	—	March 9, 2002	Socorro	LINEAR	·	1.7 km	MPC · JPL
111843	2002 EH_{30}	—	March 9, 2002	Socorro	LINEAR	NYS	1.5 km	MPC · JPL
111844	2002 EX_{30}	—	March 9, 2002	Socorro	LINEAR	·	1.7 km	MPC · JPL
111845	2002 EA_{31}	—	March 9, 2002	Socorro	LINEAR	·	1.3 km	MPC · JPL
111846	2002 EX_{31}	—	March 9, 2002	Palomar	NEAT	MAS	1.2 km	MPC · JPL
111847	2002 EL_{35}	—	March 9, 2002	Kitt Peak	Spacewatch	·	2.2 km	MPC · JPL
111848	2002 EA_{40}	—	March 9, 2002	Socorro	LINEAR	·	1.5 km	MPC · JPL
111849	2002 EU_{40}	—	March 9, 2002	Socorro	LINEAR	·	4.3 km	MPC · JPL
111850	2002 EL_{41}	—	March 12, 2002	Socorro	LINEAR	·	7.0 km	MPC · JPL
111851	2002 EO_{49}	—	March 12, 2002	Palomar	NEAT	·	1.0 km	MPC · JPL
111852	2002 EJ_{55}	—	March 13, 2002	Socorro	LINEAR	·	6.9 km	MPC · JPL
111853	2002 EV_{62}	—	March 13, 2002	Socorro	LINEAR	·	1.2 km	MPC · JPL
111854	2002 EN_{65}	—	March 13, 2002	Socorro	LINEAR	NYS	1.2 km	MPC · JPL
111855	2002 EM_{67}	—	March 13, 2002	Socorro	LINEAR	·	5.3 km	MPC · JPL
111856	2002 EC_{69}	—	March 13, 2002	Socorro	LINEAR	·	1.9 km	MPC · JPL
111857	2002 EB_{71}	—	March 13, 2002	Socorro	LINEAR	V	2.0 km	MPC · JPL
111858	2002 EO_{72}	—	March 13, 2002	Socorro	LINEAR	·	4.0 km	MPC · JPL
111859	2002 EW_{73}	—	March 13, 2002	Socorro	LINEAR	·	3.7 km	MPC · JPL
111860	2002 EQ_{74}	—	March 13, 2002	Socorro	LINEAR	·	2.3 km	MPC · JPL
111861	2002 EJ_{83}	—	March 13, 2002	Palomar	NEAT	·	1.3 km	MPC · JPL
111862	2002 EO_{86}	—	March 9, 2002	Socorro	LINEAR	·	2.6 km	MPC · JPL
111863	2002 EW_{86}	—	March 9, 2002	Socorro	LINEAR	·	2.2 km	MPC · JPL
111864	2002 EZ_{86}	—	March 9, 2002	Socorro	LINEAR	·	2.1 km	MPC · JPL
111865	2002 EN_{87}	—	March 9, 2002	Socorro	LINEAR	·	2.9 km	MPC · JPL
111866	2002 EJ_{89}	—	March 12, 2002	Socorro	LINEAR	·	7.6 km	MPC · JPL
111867	2002 EN_{89}	—	March 12, 2002	Socorro	LINEAR	H	1.0 km	MPC · JPL
111868	2002 EB_{90}	—	March 12, 2002	Socorro	LINEAR	·	1.4 km	MPC · JPL
111869	2002 EN_{91}	—	March 12, 2002	Socorro	LINEAR	NYS	2.6 km	MPC · JPL
111870	2002 EL_{97}	—	March 12, 2002	Socorro	LINEAR	·	1.2 km	MPC · JPL
111871	2002 EH_{98}	—	March 11, 2002	Socorro	LINEAR	·	1.7 km	MPC · JPL
111872	2002 ED_{100}	—	March 5, 2002	Anderson Mesa	LONEOS	·	1.2 km	MPC · JPL
111873	2002 ED_{101}	—	March 6, 2002	Socorro	LINEAR	·	5.6 km	MPC · JPL
111874	2002 EO_{101}	—	March 6, 2002	Palomar	NEAT	·	1.2 km	MPC · JPL
111875	2002 EA_{102}	—	March 6, 2002	Socorro	LINEAR	·	4.5 km	MPC · JPL
111876	2002 ED_{111}	—	March 9, 2002	Anderson Mesa	LONEOS	AGN	2.5 km	MPC · JPL
111877	2002 EM_{111}	—	March 9, 2002	Anderson Mesa	LONEOS	·	1.4 km	MPC · JPL
111878	2002 EE_{112}	—	March 9, 2002	Socorro	LINEAR	·	2.2 km	MPC · JPL
111879	2002 EZ_{114}	—	March 10, 2002	Anderson Mesa	LONEOS	V	1.5 km	MPC · JPL
111880	2002 ER_{115}	—	March 10, 2002	Haleakala	NEAT	·	1.7 km	MPC · JPL
111881	2002 EM_{126}	—	March 12, 2002	Socorro	LINEAR	·	1.2 km	MPC · JPL
111882	2002 EC_{130}	—	March 12, 2002	Anderson Mesa	LONEOS	·	6.8 km	MPC · JPL
111883	2002 EU_{132}	—	March 13, 2002	Kitt Peak	Spacewatch	·	2.0 km	MPC · JPL
111884	2002 EU_{135}	—	March 14, 2002	Anderson Mesa	LONEOS	·	1.5 km	MPC · JPL
111885	2002 EO_{139}	—	March 12, 2002	Kitt Peak	Spacewatch	HIL · 3:2	10 km	MPC · JPL
111886	2002 ET_{142}	—	March 12, 2002	Palomar	NEAT	·	900 m	MPC · JPL
111887	2002 EC_{147}	—	March 14, 2002	Palomar	NEAT	·	2.9 km	MPC · JPL
111888	2002 EE_{151}	—	March 15, 2002	Palomar	NEAT	NYS	2.1 km	MPC · JPL
111889	2002 EC_{152}	—	March 13, 2002	Palomar	NEAT	·	1.4 km	MPC · JPL
111890	2002 EK_{153}	—	March 15, 2002	Palomar	NEAT	MAS	1.7 km	MPC · JPL
111891	2002 FV_{1}	—	March 19, 2002	Fountain Hills	Hills, Fountain	·	11 km	MPC · JPL
111892	2002 FU_{2}	—	March 19, 2002	Desert Eagle	W. K. Y. Yeung	·	1.3 km	MPC · JPL
111893	2002 FW_{2}	—	March 19, 2002	Desert Eagle	W. K. Y. Yeung	·	1.5 km	MPC · JPL
111894	2002 FD_{3}	—	March 16, 2002	Socorro	LINEAR	·	1.5 km	MPC · JPL
111895	2002 FH_{3}	—	March 17, 2002	Socorro	LINEAR	H	1.2 km	MPC · JPL
111896	2002 FL_{4}	—	March 20, 2002	Desert Eagle	W. K. Y. Yeung	·	1.9 km	MPC · JPL
111897	2002 FP_{4}	—	March 20, 2002	Desert Eagle	W. K. Y. Yeung	·	1.9 km	MPC · JPL
111898	2002 FF_{5}	—	March 20, 2002	Socorro	LINEAR	H	1.1 km	MPC · JPL
111899	2002 FD_{11}	—	March 16, 2002	Socorro	LINEAR	·	1.4 km	MPC · JPL
111900	2002 FS_{15}	—	March 16, 2002	Haleakala	NEAT	V	1.6 km	MPC · JPL

== 111901–112000 ==
back to top

Designation			Discovery			Properties		Ref
Permanent	Provisional	Named after	Date	Site	Discoverer(s)	Category	Diam.	Ref
111901	2002 FE_{17}	—	March 17, 2002	Haleakala	NEAT	·	1.9 km	MPC · JPL
111902	2002 FJ_{29}	—	March 20, 2002	Socorro	LINEAR	·	1.5 km	MPC · JPL
111903	2002 FV_{29}	—	March 20, 2002	Socorro	LINEAR	URS	7.5 km	MPC · JPL
111904	2002 FO_{31}	—	March 20, 2002	Palomar	NEAT	·	4.2 km	MPC · JPL
111905	2002 FQ_{31}	—	March 19, 2002	Anderson Mesa	LONEOS	·	1.3 km	MPC · JPL
111906	2002 FF_{33}	—	March 20, 2002	Socorro	LINEAR	·	4.3 km	MPC · JPL
111907	2002 FO_{33}	—	March 20, 2002	Socorro	LINEAR	·	1.6 km	MPC · JPL
111908	2002 FY_{33}	—	March 20, 2002	Socorro	LINEAR	NYS	1.4 km	MPC · JPL
111909	2002 FK_{34}	—	March 20, 2002	Anderson Mesa	LONEOS	NYS	2.1 km	MPC · JPL
111910	2002 FU_{34}	—	March 20, 2002	Anderson Mesa	LONEOS	·	1.5 km	MPC · JPL
111911	2002 FE_{36}	—	March 21, 2002	Desert Eagle	W. K. Y. Yeung	EOS	3.9 km	MPC · JPL
111912	2002 FV_{39}	—	March 16, 2002	Socorro	LINEAR	·	1.5 km	MPC · JPL
111913 Davidgans	2002 GD	Davidgans	April 1, 2002	Kleť	KLENOT	·	5.5 km	MPC · JPL
111914	2002 GS_{2}	—	April 4, 2002	Socorro	LINEAR	H	1.2 km	MPC · JPL
111915	2002 GN_{3}	—	April 8, 2002	Palomar	NEAT	·	3.0 km	MPC · JPL
111916	2002 GE_{5}	—	April 10, 2002	Socorro	LINEAR	·	1.2 km	MPC · JPL
111917	2002 GL_{9}	—	April 15, 2002	Desert Eagle	W. K. Y. Yeung	·	2.5 km	MPC · JPL
111918	2002 GS_{10}	—	April 10, 2002	Socorro	LINEAR	·	1.2 km	MPC · JPL
111919	2002 GH_{11}	—	April 14, 2002	Desert Eagle	W. K. Y. Yeung	·	1.6 km	MPC · JPL
111920	2002 GX_{11}	—	April 15, 2002	Desert Eagle	W. K. Y. Yeung	·	5.0 km	MPC · JPL
111921	2002 GH_{13}	—	April 14, 2002	Socorro	LINEAR	·	1.1 km	MPC · JPL
111922	2002 GU_{17}	—	April 15, 2002	Socorro	LINEAR	·	1.4 km	MPC · JPL
111923	2002 GW_{17}	—	April 15, 2002	Socorro	LINEAR	PHO	2.0 km	MPC · JPL
111924	2002 GS_{19}	—	April 14, 2002	Socorro	LINEAR	·	2.0 km	MPC · JPL
111925	2002 GD_{20}	—	April 14, 2002	Socorro	LINEAR	·	1.0 km	MPC · JPL
111926	2002 GJ_{20}	—	April 14, 2002	Socorro	LINEAR	·	2.1 km	MPC · JPL
111927	2002 GX_{20}	—	April 14, 2002	Socorro	LINEAR	·	1.7 km	MPC · JPL
111928	2002 GA_{22}	—	April 15, 2002	Socorro	LINEAR	3:2	12 km	MPC · JPL
111929	2002 GQ_{23}	—	April 15, 2002	Palomar	NEAT	(2076)	1.5 km	MPC · JPL
111930	2002 GP_{25}	—	April 12, 2002	Socorro	LINEAR	V	1.7 km	MPC · JPL
111931	2002 GU_{25}	—	April 14, 2002	Socorro	LINEAR	·	1.6 km	MPC · JPL
111932	2002 GG_{33}	—	April 1, 2002	Palomar	NEAT	L4	10 km	MPC · JPL
111933 Alphonsetardif	2002 GK_{37}	Alphonsetardif	April 3, 2002	Kitt Peak	Spacewatch	INA	5.0 km	MPC · JPL
111934	2002 GG_{38}	—	April 2, 2002	Palomar	NEAT	H	1.5 km	MPC · JPL
111935	2002 GB_{40}	—	April 4, 2002	Palomar	NEAT	·	2.5 km	MPC · JPL
111936	2002 GE_{40}	—	April 4, 2002	Palomar	NEAT	·	1.2 km	MPC · JPL
111937	2002 GG_{41}	—	April 4, 2002	Palomar	NEAT	·	2.0 km	MPC · JPL
111938	2002 GB_{44}	—	April 4, 2002	Palomar	NEAT	·	3.0 km	MPC · JPL
111939	2002 GJ_{45}	—	April 4, 2002	Palomar	NEAT	·	1.3 km	MPC · JPL
111940	2002 GT_{47}	—	April 4, 2002	Haleakala	NEAT	·	4.1 km	MPC · JPL
111941	2002 GF_{48}	—	April 4, 2002	Palomar	NEAT	·	2.5 km	MPC · JPL
111942	2002 GB_{51}	—	April 5, 2002	Anderson Mesa	LONEOS	·	2.5 km	MPC · JPL
111943	2002 GM_{51}	—	April 5, 2002	Palomar	NEAT	·	2.4 km	MPC · JPL
111944	2002 GS_{53}	—	April 5, 2002	Palomar	NEAT	·	2.0 km	MPC · JPL
111945	2002 GY_{55}	—	April 5, 2002	Anderson Mesa	LONEOS	·	1.3 km	MPC · JPL
111946	2002 GA_{56}	—	April 5, 2002	Anderson Mesa	LONEOS	·	9.1 km	MPC · JPL
111947	2002 GF_{56}	—	April 5, 2002	Palomar	NEAT	·	1.6 km	MPC · JPL
111948	2002 GG_{56}	—	April 5, 2002	Palomar	NEAT	·	2.3 km	MPC · JPL
111949	2002 GY_{56}	—	April 8, 2002	Palomar	NEAT	·	3.6 km	MPC · JPL
111950	2002 GM_{57}	—	April 8, 2002	Palomar	NEAT	·	6.1 km	MPC · JPL
111951	2002 GY_{57}	—	April 8, 2002	Kitt Peak	Spacewatch	MAS	1.5 km	MPC · JPL
111952	2002 GX_{61}	—	April 8, 2002	Palomar	NEAT	·	1.7 km	MPC · JPL
111953	2002 GD_{62}	—	April 8, 2002	Palomar	NEAT	·	1.8 km	MPC · JPL
111954	2002 GZ_{65}	—	April 8, 2002	Palomar	NEAT	·	1.5 km	MPC · JPL
111955	2002 GW_{66}	—	April 8, 2002	Palomar	NEAT	·	2.7 km	MPC · JPL
111956	2002 GX_{68}	—	April 8, 2002	Palomar	NEAT	·	1.0 km	MPC · JPL
111957	2002 GP_{70}	—	April 8, 2002	Palomar	NEAT	·	3.1 km	MPC · JPL
111958	2002 GH_{72}	—	April 9, 2002	Anderson Mesa	LONEOS	·	1.7 km	MPC · JPL
111959	2002 GP_{73}	—	April 9, 2002	Anderson Mesa	LONEOS	·	1.5 km	MPC · JPL
111960	2002 GT_{73}	—	April 9, 2002	Palomar	NEAT	MAS	1.3 km	MPC · JPL
111961	2002 GM_{75}	—	April 9, 2002	Socorro	LINEAR	·	1.9 km	MPC · JPL
111962	2002 GP_{75}	—	April 9, 2002	Socorro	LINEAR	·	1.4 km	MPC · JPL
111963	2002 GH_{78}	—	April 9, 2002	Socorro	LINEAR	·	1.7 km	MPC · JPL
111964	2002 GO_{78}	—	April 9, 2002	Socorro	LINEAR	·	2.0 km	MPC · JPL
111965	2002 GP_{78}	—	April 9, 2002	Socorro	LINEAR	·	1.6 km	MPC · JPL
111966	2002 GD_{79}	—	April 10, 2002	Socorro	LINEAR	·	2.2 km	MPC · JPL
111967	2002 GC_{81}	—	April 10, 2002	Socorro	LINEAR	·	2.5 km	MPC · JPL
111968	2002 GX_{81}	—	April 10, 2002	Socorro	LINEAR	V	1.2 km	MPC · JPL
111969	2002 GW_{82}	—	April 10, 2002	Socorro	LINEAR	V	1.2 km	MPC · JPL
111970	2002 GL_{83}	—	April 10, 2002	Socorro	LINEAR	PHO	1.9 km	MPC · JPL
111971	2002 GZ_{83}	—	April 10, 2002	Socorro	LINEAR	·	3.2 km	MPC · JPL
111972	2002 GR_{87}	—	April 10, 2002	Socorro	LINEAR	V	1.4 km	MPC · JPL
111973	2002 GX_{87}	—	April 10, 2002	Socorro	LINEAR	·	1.4 km	MPC · JPL
111974	2002 GN_{88}	—	April 10, 2002	Socorro	LINEAR	·	2.8 km	MPC · JPL
111975	2002 GA_{89}	—	April 10, 2002	Socorro	LINEAR	PHO	2.0 km	MPC · JPL
111976	2002 GX_{92}	—	April 9, 2002	Socorro	LINEAR	V	1.2 km	MPC · JPL
111977	2002 GB_{93}	—	April 9, 2002	Socorro	LINEAR	MAR	2.2 km	MPC · JPL
111978	2002 GM_{93}	—	April 9, 2002	Socorro	LINEAR	·	1.6 km	MPC · JPL
111979	2002 GP_{93}	—	April 9, 2002	Socorro	LINEAR	·	880 m	MPC · JPL
111980	2002 GU_{93}	—	April 9, 2002	Socorro	LINEAR	·	1.4 km	MPC · JPL
111981	2002 GW_{93}	—	April 9, 2002	Socorro	LINEAR	·	5.9 km	MPC · JPL
111982	2002 GA_{95}	—	April 9, 2002	Socorro	LINEAR	·	1.5 km	MPC · JPL
111983	2002 GE_{95}	—	April 9, 2002	Socorro	LINEAR	·	3.3 km	MPC · JPL
111984	2002 GJ_{95}	—	April 9, 2002	Socorro	LINEAR	·	1.6 km	MPC · JPL
111985	2002 GM_{95}	—	April 9, 2002	Socorro	LINEAR	(2076)	1.2 km	MPC · JPL
111986	2002 GC_{96}	—	April 9, 2002	Socorro	LINEAR	·	1.3 km	MPC · JPL
111987	2002 GT_{96}	—	April 9, 2002	Socorro	LINEAR	·	2.7 km	MPC · JPL
111988	2002 GU_{96}	—	April 9, 2002	Socorro	LINEAR	·	7.5 km	MPC · JPL
111989	2002 GV_{96}	—	April 9, 2002	Socorro	LINEAR	·	850 m	MPC · JPL
111990	2002 GY_{103}	—	April 10, 2002	Socorro	LINEAR	·	1.1 km	MPC · JPL
111991	2002 GL_{107}	—	April 11, 2002	Socorro	LINEAR	·	1.5 km	MPC · JPL
111992	2002 GX_{110}	—	April 10, 2002	Socorro	LINEAR	·	1.5 km	MPC · JPL
111993	2002 GA_{111}	—	April 10, 2002	Socorro	LINEAR	·	1.5 km	MPC · JPL
111994	2002 GW_{111}	—	April 10, 2002	Socorro	LINEAR	V	1.2 km	MPC · JPL
111995	2002 GG_{114}	—	April 11, 2002	Socorro	LINEAR	3:2	9.1 km	MPC · JPL
111996	2002 GV_{117}	—	April 11, 2002	Socorro	LINEAR	·	1.4 km	MPC · JPL
111997	2002 GX_{123}	—	April 12, 2002	Socorro	LINEAR	H	830 m	MPC · JPL
111998	2002 GN_{133}	—	April 12, 2002	Socorro	LINEAR	·	2.1 km	MPC · JPL
111999	2002 GB_{134}	—	April 12, 2002	Socorro	LINEAR	·	2.2 km	MPC · JPL
112000	2002 GO_{137}	—	April 12, 2002	Socorro	LINEAR	·	1.3 km	MPC · JPL

back to top

== See also ==
- Meanings of minor-planet names: 111001–112000
