= Meanings of minor-planet names: 23001–24000 =

As minor planet discoveries are confirmed, they are given a permanent number by the IAU's Minor Planet Center (MPC), and the discoverers can then submit names for them, following the IAU's naming conventions. The list below concerns those minor planets in the specified number-range that have received names, and explains the meanings of those names.

Official naming citations of newly named small Solar System bodies are approved and published in a bulletin by IAU's Working Group for Small Bodies Nomenclature (WGSBN). Before May 2021, citations were published in MPC's Minor Planet Circulars for many decades. Recent citations can also be found on the JPL Small-Body Database (SBDB). Until his death in 2016, German astronomer Lutz D. Schmadel compiled these citations into the Dictionary of Minor Planet Names (DMP) and regularly updated the collection.

Based on Paul Herget's The Names of the Minor Planets, Schmadel also researched the unclear origin of numerous asteroids, most of which had been named prior to World War II. This article incorporates text from this source, which is in the public domain: SBDB New namings may only be added to this list below after official publication as the preannouncement of names is condemned. The WGSBN publishes a comprehensive guideline for the naming rules of non-cometary small Solar System bodies.

== 23001–23100 ==
| Named minor planet | Provisional | This minor planet was named for... | Ref · Catalog |
|---|---|---|---|
| 23002 Jillhirsch | 1999 VX_{92} | Jill Hirsch, American mentor of a 2007 Intel Science Talent Search (ISTS) finalist | JPL · 23002 |
| 23003 Ziminski | 1999 VP_{106} | Mark Ziminski, American mentor of a 2007 Intel Science Talent Search (ISTS) finalist | JPL · 23003 |
| 23004 Triciatalbert | 1999 VH_{114} | Tricia Talbert (born 1964), supported NASA's Planetary Defense Coordination Office (PDCO). | JPL · 23004 |
| 23006 Pazden | 1999 VX_{137} | Stan Pazden, American mentor of a 2007 Intel Science Talent Search (ISTS) finalist | JPL · 23006 |
| 23008 Rebeccajohns | 1999 VA_{149} | Rebecca Johns, American mentor of a 2007 Intel Science Talent Search (ISTS) finalist | JPL · 23008 |
| 23010 Kathyfinch | 1999 VR_{158} | Kathy Finch, American mentor of a 2007 Intel Science Talent Search (ISTS) finalist | JPL · 23010 |
| 23011 Petach | 1999 VG_{163} | Helen Petach, American mentor of a 2007 Intel Science Talent Search (ISTS) finalist | JPL · 23011 |
| 23013 Carolsmyth | 1999 VP_{168} | Carol Smyth, American mentor of a 2007 Intel Science Talent Search (ISTS) finalist | JPL · 23013 |
| 23014 Walstein | 1999 VV_{173} | Eric Walstein, American mentor of a 2007 Intel Science Talent Search (ISTS) finalist | JPL · 23014 |
| 23016 Michaelroche | 1999 VZ_{184} | Michael Roche, American mentor of a 2007 Intel Science Talent Search (ISTS) finalist | JPL · 23016 |
| 23017 Advincula | 1999 VQ_{190} | Rigoberto Advincula, American mentor of a 2007 Intel Science Talent Search (ISTS) finalist | JPL · 23017 |
| 23018 Annmoriarty | 1999 VY_{190} | Ann Moriarty, American mentor of a 2007 Intel Science Talent Search (ISTS) finalist | JPL · 23018 |
| 23019 Thomgregory | 1999 VQ_{201} | Thomas Gregory, American mentor of a 2007 Intel Science Talent Search (ISTS) finalist | JPL · 23019 |
| 23030 Jimkennedy | 1999 XR_{7} | James R. Kennedy (born 1941), an American radio astronomer of the University of Florida and a researcher at the former Arecibo Observatory in Puerto Rico. | JPL · 23030 |
| 23032 Fossey | 1999 XB_{8} | Dian Fossey, American ethologist | JPL · 23032 |
| 23038 Jeffbaughman | 1999 XD_{19} | Jeffrey Baughman, American mentor of a 2007 Intel Science Talent Search (ISTS) finalist | JPL · 23038 |
| 23040 Latham | 1999 XK_{22} | Robert Latham, American mentor of a 2007 Intel Science Talent Search (ISTS) finalist | JPL · 23040 |
| 23041 Hunt | 1999 XL_{22} | Patricia Hunt, American mentor of a 2007 Intel Science Talent Search (ISTS) finalist | JPL · 23041 |
| 23042 Craigpeters | 1999 XR_{22} | Craig Peters, American mentor of a 2007 Intel Science Talent Search (ISTS) finalist | JPL · 23042 |
| 23044 Starodub | 1999 XS_{25} | Peter Starodub, American mentor of a 2007 Intel Science Talent Search (ISTS) finalist | JPL · 23044 |
| 23045 Sarahocken | 1999 XT_{27} | Sarah Hocken, American mentor of a 2007 Intel Science Talent Search (ISTS) finalist | JPL · 23045 |
| 23046 Stevengordon | 1999 XN_{28} | Steven Gordon, American mentor of a 2007 Intel Science Talent Search (ISTS) finalist | JPL · 23046 |
| 23047 Isseroff | 1999 XS_{28} | Rebecca Isseroff, American mentor of a 2007 Intel Science Talent Search (ISTS) finalist | JPL · 23047 |
| 23048 Davidnelson | 1999 XE_{29} | David Nelson, American mentor of a 2007 Intel Science Talent Search (ISTS) finalist | JPL · 23048 |
| 23054 Thomaslynch | 1999 XE_{42} | Thomas Lynch, American mentor of a 2007 Intel Science Talent Search (ISTS) finalist | JPL · 23054 |
| 23055 Barbjewett | 1999 XF_{43} | Barbara Jewett, American mentor of a 2006 Intel Science Talent Search (ISTS) finalist | JPL · 23055 |
| 23057 Angelawilson | 1999 XB_{45} | Angela Wilson, American mentor of a 2005 Intel Science Talent Search (ISTS) finalist | JPL · 23057 |
| 23059 Paulpaino | 1999 XT_{45} | Paul Paino, American mentor of a 2005 Intel Science Talent Search (ISTS) finalist | JPL · 23059 |
| 23060 Shepherd | 1999 XV_{46} | Karen Shepherd, American mentor of a 2005 Intel Science Talent Search (ISTS) finalist | JPL · 23060 |
| 23061 Blueglass | 1999 XW_{46} | Michael Blueglass, American mentor of a 2004 Intel Science Talent Search (ISTS) finalist | JPL · 23061 |
| 23062 Donnamooney | 1999 XN_{52} | Donna Mooney, American mentor of a 2004 Intel Science Talent Search (ISTS) finalist | JPL · 23062 |
| 23063 Lichtman | 1999 XH_{53} | Paul Lichtman, American mentor of a 2004 Intel Science Talent Search (ISTS) finalist | JPL · 23063 |
| 23064 Mattmiller | 1999 XE_{54} | Matthew Miller, American mentor of a 2004 Discovery Channel Young Scientist Challenge (DCYSC) finalist | JPL · 23064 |
| 23066 Yihedong | 1999 XN_{54} | Yihe Dong, American winner of the 2007 Intel International Science and Engineering Fair (ISEF) | JPL · 23066 |
| 23067 Ishajain | 1999 XX_{54} | Isha Himani Jain, American winner of the 2007 Intel International Science and Engineering Fair (ISEF) | JPL · 23067 |
| 23068 Tyagi | 1999 XY_{60} | Sonika Tyagi, American finalist in the 2007 Intel International Science and Engineering Fair (ISEF) | JPL · 23068 |
| 23069 Kapps | 1999 XR_{64} | Michael Kapps, Canadian finalist in the 2007 Intel International Science and Engineering Fair (ISEF) | JPL · 23069 |
| 23070 Koussa | 1999 XV_{64} | Mounir Ahmad Koussa, American winner of the 2007 Intel International Science and Engineering Fair (ISEF) | JPL · 23070 |
| 23071 Tinaliu | 1999 XH_{65} | Tina Liu, American finalist in the 2007 Intel International Science and Engineering Fair (ISEF) | JPL · 23071 |
| 23074 Sarakirsch | 1999 XJ_{78} | Sarah Kirsch, American finalist in the 2007 Intel International Science and Engineering Fair (ISEF) | JPL · 23074 |
| 23079 Munguia | 1999 XO_{97} | Scott Miguel Munguía, Mexican finalist in the 2007 Intel International Science and Engineering Fair (ISEF) | JPL · 23079 |
| 23091 Stansill | 1999 XP_{128} | Lacey Nicole Stansill, American finalist in the 2007 Intel International Science and Engineering Fair (ISEF) | JPL · 23091 |
| 23096 Mihika | 1999 XT_{156} | Mihika Pradhan, American winner of the 2007 Intel International Science and Engineering Fair (ISEF) | JPL · 23096 |
| 23098 Huanghuang | 1999 XH_{158} | Huang Huang, American finalist in the 2007 Intel International Science and Engineering Fair (ISEF) | JPL · 23098 |

== 23101–23200 ==
back to top

| Named minor planet | Provisional | This minor planet was named for... | Ref · Catalog |
|---|---|---|---|
| 23102 Dayanli | 1999 XA_{168} | Dayan Li (born 1989), American winner of the 2007 Intel International Science and Engineering Fair (ISEF) and Intel Foundation Young Scientist Award (IFYS) recipient | JPL · 23102 |
| 23109 Masayanagisawa | 1999 YD_{13} | Masahisa Yanagisawa (born 1955), planetary scientist at the University of Electro-Communications, Tokyo. | JPL · 23109 |
| 23110 Ericberne | 2000 AE | Eric Berne (1910–1970), Canadian physician and psychiatrist | JPL · 23110 |
| 23111 Fritzperls | 2000 AG | Fritz Perls (1893–1970), German psychologist and psychotherapist | JPL · 23111 |
| 23113 Aaronhakim | 2000 AE_{13} | Aaron Hakim (born 1991), Canadian finalist in the 2007 Intel International Science and Engineering Fair (ISEF) | JPL · 23113 |
| 23115 Valcourt | 2000 AS_{18} | James R. Valcourt (born 1989), American finalist in the 2007 Intel International Science and Engineering Fair (ISEF) | JPL · 23115 |
| 23116 Streich | 2000 AW_{22} | Philip Vidal Streich (born 1991), American winner of the 2007 Intel International Science and Engineering Fair (ISEF) and Intel Foundation Young Scientist Award (IFYS) recipient | JPL · 23116 |
| 23120 Paulallen | 2000 AP_{50} | Paul Allen (1953–2018), American computer industry executive and co-founded Microsoft, financial supporter of the Spacewatch program, of SpaceShipOne civilian suborbital space flight, and the radio-astronomy Allen Telescope Array (ATA) | JPL · 23120 |
| 23121 Michaelding | 2000 AP_{51} | Michael Ding (born 1990), American finalist in the 2007 Intel International Science and Engineering Fair (ISEF) | JPL · 23121 |
| 23122 Lorgat | 2000 AU_{52} | Raeez Lorgat (born 1990), South African winner of the 2007 Intel International Science and Engineering Fair (ISEF) | JPL · 23122 |
| 23128 Dorminy | 2000 AQ_{98} | John Wilson Dorminy (born 1991), American finalist in the 2007 Intel International Science and Engineering Fair (ISEF) | JPL · 23128 |
| 23131 Debenedictis | 2000 AS_{128} | Erika Alden DeBenedictis (born 1992), American finalist in the 2007 Intel International Science and Engineering Fair (ISEF) | JPL · 23131 |
| 23133 Rishinbehl | 2000 AO_{139} | Rishin Behl (born 1989), Indian finalist in the 2007 Intel International Science and Engineering Fair (ISEF) | JPL · 23133 |
| 23135 Pheidas | 2000 AN_{146} | Pheidas, from Greek mythology. He was an Athenian warrior who fought to prevent Hector from reaching the Greek ships. | IAU · 23135 |
| 23151 Georgehotz | 2000 BH_{27} | George Francis Hotz (born 1989), American winner of the 2007 Intel International Science and Engineering Fair (ISEF) and Seaborg SIYSS Award (Stockholm International Youth Science Seminar) Award recipient | JPL · 23151 |
| 23153 Andrewnowell | 2000 CH_{46} | Andrew John Nowell (born 1988), English winner of the 2007 Intel International Science and Engineering Fair (ISEF) | JPL · 23153 |
| 23155 Judithblack | 2000 CK_{86} | Judith Black (born 1988), Northern Irish finalist in the 2007 Intel International Science and Engineering Fair (ISEF) | JPL · 23155 |
| 23158 Bouligny | 2000 DN_{99} | Ian Michael Bouligny (born 1990), American finalist in the 2007 Intel International Science and Engineering Fair (ISEF) | JPL · 23158 |
| 23162 Alexcrook | 2000 FX_{48} | Alexandra Elizabeth Crook (born 1989), American finalist in the 2007 Intel International Science and Engineering Fair (ISEF) | JPL · 23162 |
| 23164 Badger | 2000 GR_{73} | David Charles Griffiths Badger (born 1988), English finalist in the 2007 Intel International Science and Engineering Fair (ISEF) | JPL · 23164 |
| 23165 Kakinchan | 2000 GO_{81} | Ka Kin Chan (born 1988), Chinese (Hong Kong) winner of the 2007 Intel International Science and Engineering Fair (ISEF) | JPL · 23165 |
| 23166 Bilal | 2000 GE_{104} | Kulsum Bilal (born 1993), Pakistani finalist in the 2007 Intel International Science and Engineering Fair (ISEF) | JPL · 23166 |
| 23168 Lauriefletch | 2000 GZ_{136} | Laurie Lea Fletcher (born 1989), American finalist in the 2007 Intel International Science and Engineering Fair (ISEF) | JPL · 23168 |
| 23169 Michikami | 2000 GK_{174} | Tatsuhiro Michikami (born 1971), a planetary scientist at Fukushima College of Technology, Japan. | JPL · 23169 |
| 23172 Williamartin | 2000 HU_{22} | William Campbell Martin (born 1989), American winner of the 2007 Intel International Science and Engineering Fair (ISEF) | JPL · 23172 |
| 23173 Hideaki | 2000 HF_{26} | Hideaki Miyamoto (born 1970), a planetary scientist at the University of Tokyo. | JPL · 23173 |
| 23176 Missacarvell | 2000 JK_{44} | Melissa Nicole Carvell (born 1990), American finalist in the 2007 Intel International Science and Engineering Fair (ISEF) | JPL · 23176 |
| 23178 Ghaben | 2000 KJ_{21} | Alexandra L. Ghaben (born 1992), American finalist in the 2007 Intel International Science and Engineering Fair (ISEF) | JPL · 23178 |
| 23179 Niedermeyer | 2000 KF_{28} | Harper-Grace Niedermeyer (born 1991), American finalist in the 2007 Intel International Science and Engineering Fair (ISEF) | JPL · 23179 |
| 23180 Ryosuke | 2000 KH_{57} | Ryosuke Nakamura (born 1968), a remote-sensing specialist of the National Institute of Advanced Industrial Science and Technology, Tsukuba, Japan | JPL · 23180 |
| 23182 Siyaxuza | 2000 OV_{12} | Siyabulela Xuza (born 1989), South African winner of the 2007 International Science and Engineering Fair (ISEF) | JPL · 23182 |
| 23186 Knauss | 2000 PO_{8} | Tracy Knauss, American amateur astronomer. | IAU · 23186 |
| 23190 Klages-Mundt | 2000 QP_{29} | Ariah Aram Klages-Mundt (born 1989), American finalist in the 2007 Intel International Science and Engineering Fair (ISEF) | JPL · 23190 |
| 23191 Sujaytyle | 2000 QD_{45} | Sujay Tyle (born 1993), American finalist in the 2007 Intel International Science and Engineering Fair (ISEF) | JPL · 23191 |
| 23192 Caysvesterby | 2000 QN_{122} | Ashiyah Melyne Cays Vesterby (born 1990), American finalist in the 2007 Intel International Science and Engineering Fair (ISEF) | JPL · 23192 |
| 23197 Danielcook | 2000 RA_{62} | Daniel Kenneth Cook (born 1989), American finalist in the 2007 Intel International Science and Engineering Fair (ISEF) | JPL · 23197 |
| 23198 Norvell | 2000 RL_{68} | Leighton Marie Norvell (born 1989), American finalist in the 2007 Intel International Science and Engineering Fair (ISEF) | JPL · 23198 |
| 23199 Bezdek | 2000 RB_{92} | Daniel Karoly Bezdek (born 1990), Canadian finalist in the 2007 Intel International Science and Engineering Fair (ISEF) | JPL · 23199 |

== 23201–23300 ==
back to top

| Named minor planet | Provisional | This minor planet was named for... | Ref · Catalog |
|---|---|---|---|
| 23204 Arditkroni | 2000 SN_{172} | Ardit Kroni, Irish finalist in the 2007 Intel International Science and Engineering Fair (ISEF) | JPL · 23204 |
| 23212 Arkajitdey | 2000 UR_{39} | Arkajit Dey, American finalist in the 2007 Intel International Science and Engineering Fair (ISEF) | JPL · 23212 |
| 23213 Ameliachang | 2000 US_{70} | Amelia Nong Shin Chang, Singaporean winner of the 2007 Intel International Science and Engineering Fair (ISEF) | JPL · 23213 |
| 23214 Patrickchen | 2000 UQ_{73} | Patrick Ming Chen, American winner of the 2007 Intel International Science and Engineering Fair (ISEF) | JPL · 23214 |
| 23216 Mikehagler | 2000 UX_{79} | Michael David Hagler, American winner in the 2007 Intel International Science and Engineering Fair (ISEF) | JPL · 23216 |
| 23217 Nayana | 2000 UV_{104} | Nayana Ghosh-Choudhury, American finalist in the 2007 Intel International Science and Engineering Fair (ISEF) | JPL · 23217 |
| 23218 Puttachi | 2000 VN_{23} | Arun Puttachi, American finalist in the 2007 Intel International Science and Engineering Fair (ISEF) | JPL · 23218 |
| 23220 Yalemichaels | 2000 VO_{28} | Yale Stern Michaels, Canadian finalist in the 2007 Intel International Science and Engineering Fair (ISEF) | JPL · 23220 |
| 23221 Delgado | 2000 VX_{35} | Eric Nelson Delgado, American winner of the 2007 Intel International Science and Engineering Fair (ISEF) | JPL · 23221 |
| 23228 Nandinisarma | 2000 WQ_{57} | Nandini Sarma, American winner of the 2007 Intel International Science and Engineering Fair (ISEF) | JPL · 23228 |
| 23232 Buschur | 2000 WU_{59} | Kristina Lynn Buschur, American finalist in the 2007 Intel International Science and Engineering Fair (ISEF) | JPL · 23232 |
| 23234 Lilliantsai | 2000 WO_{88} | Lillian Lee Tsai, American finalist in the 2007 Intel International Science and Engineering Fair (ISEF) | JPL · 23234 |
| 23235 Yingfan | 2000 WD_{98} | Ying Fan, American finalist in the 2007 Intel International Science and Engineering Fair (ISEF) | JPL · 23235 |
| 23238 Ocasio-Cortez | 2000 WU_{111} | Alexandria Ocasio-Cortez, American finalist in the 2007 Intel International Science and Engineering Fair (ISEF) where she came in second in the Microbiology category. 23061 Blueglass was named after her high school science teacher Michael Blueglass, American mentor of 2004 Intel Science Talent Search (ISTS) finalist Rohini Subhadra Rau-Murthy after which 20291 Raumurthy was named | JPL · 23238 |
| 23241 Yada | 2000 WV_{131} | Toru Yada (born 1971), a planetary scientist at the Institute of Space and Astronautical Science at JAXA. | JPL · 23241 |
| 23244 Lafayette | 2000 WP_{162} | Recognized as a symbolic figure of French-American friendship, Marie-Josephe Paul Yves Roch Gilbert du Motier, Marquis de La Fayette (1757–1834), on his own initiative served as a general in the Continental Army during the American Revolution and as commander-in-chief of the Garde Nationale during the French Revolution | JPL · 23244 |
| 23245 Fujimura | 2000 WP_{168} | Akio Fujimura (born 1947), a planetary scientist and former professor at the Institute of Space and Astronautical Science at JAXA. | JPL · 23245 |
| 23246 Terazono | 2000 WY_{168} | Junya Terazono (born 1967) is a planetary scientist and information technology specialist. | JPL · 23246 |
| 23248 Batchelor | 2000 WW_{178} | Holly Reid Batchelor, Scottish winner of the 2007 Intel International Science and Engineering Fair (ISEF) | JPL · 23248 |
| 23249 Liaoyenting | 2000 WJ_{179} | Liao Yen-Ting, Taiwanese finalist in the 2007 Intel International Science and Engineering Fair (ISEF) | JPL · 23249 |
| 23254 Chikatoshi | 2000 YZ_{15} | Chikatoshi Honda, Japanese planetary scientist. | JPL · 23254 |
| 23257 Denny | 2000 YW_{21} | Robert B. Denny (born 1946), a robotic telescope software developer known for his "Pin Point Astrometry Engine" and the "ACP telescope control". | MPC · 23257 |
| 23258 Tsuihark | 2000 YY_{21} | Hark Tsui, Chinese (Hong Kong) movie producer and director † | MPC · 23258 |
| 23259 Miwadagakuen | 2000 YX_{29} | Miwada Gakuen is a girls' school, established by a Confucian, Masako Miwada (1843–1927), in 1887 to provide an opportunity for the education of women. The organizational meeting of the Japan Spaceguard Association was held in the hall of this school on 1996 Oct. 20 | JPL · 23259 |
| 23262 Thiagoolson | 2000 YW_{44} | Thiago David Olson, American finalist in the 2007 Intel International Science and Engineering Fair (ISEF) | JPL · 23262 |
| 23265 von Wurden | 2000 YO_{50} | Caroline Julia von Wurden, American finalist in the 2007 Intel International Science and Engineering Fair (ISEF) | JPL · 23265 |
| 23270 Kellerman | 2000 YN_{62} | Tanja Kellerman, South African winner of the 2007 Intel International Science and Engineering Fair (ISEF) | JPL · 23270 |
| 23271 Kellychacon | 2000 YO_{67} | Kelly Michelle Chacon, American finalist in the 2007 Intel International Science and Engineering Fair (ISEF) | JPL · 23271 |
| 23274 Wuminchun | 2000 YK_{91} | Wu Min-Chun, Taiwanese finalist in the 2007 Intel International Science and Engineering Fair (ISEF) | JPL · 23274 |
| 23277 Benhughes | 2000 YC_{104} | Benjamin Fitzroy Hughes, Australian finalist in the 2007 Intel International Science and Engineering Fair (ISEF) | JPL · 23277 |
| 23279 Chenhungjen | 2000 YY_{115} | Chen Hung-Jen, Taiwanese winner of the 2007 Intel International Science and Engineering Fair (ISEF) | JPL · 23279 |
| 23280 Laitsaita | 2000 YT_{116} | Lai Tsai-Ta, Taiwanese winner of the 2007 Intel International Science and Engineering Fair (ISEF) | JPL · 23280 |
| 23281 Vijayjain | 2000 YY_{116} | Vijay Jain, American winner of the 2007 Intel International Science and Engineering Fair (ISEF) | JPL · 23281 |
| 23283 Jinjuyi | 2000 YP_{117} | JinJu Yi, American winner of the 2007 Intel International Science and Engineering Fair (ISEF) | JPL · 23283 |
| 23284 Celik | 2000 YD_{118} | Burak Çelik, Turkish winner of the 2007 Intel International Science and Engineering Fair (ISEF) | JPL · 23284 |
| 23286 Parlakgul | 2000 YH_{120} | Güneş Parlakgül, Turkish winner of the 2007 Intel International Science and Engineering Fair (ISEF) | JPL · 23286 |
| 23289 Naruhirata | 2000 YQ_{126} | Naru Hirata, Japanese planetary scientist. | JPL · 23289 |
| 23294 Sunao | 2000 YJ_{137} | Sunao Hasegawa (born 1969) manages the two-stage light-gas guns facility at the Institute of Space and Astronautical Science at JAXA. The facility is used to study high-velocity impact processes. Hasegawa contributes asteroid observations made by the Japanese infrared satellite AKARI. | JPL · 23294 |
| 23295 Brandoreavis | 2000 YK_{137} | Brandon Lee Reavis, American winner of the 2007 Intel International Science and Engineering Fair (ISEF) | JPL · 23295 |
| 23296 Brianreavis | 2001 AR_{3} | Brian Christopher Reavis, American winner of the 2007 Intel International Science and Engineering Fair (ISEF) | JPL · 23296 |
| 23298 Loewenstein | 2001 AA_{5} | Jacob Charles Loewenstein, American winner of the 2007 Intel International Science and Engineering Fair (ISEF) | JPL · 23298 |

== 23301–23400 ==
back to top

| Named minor planet | Provisional | This minor planet was named for... | Ref · Catalog |
|---|---|---|---|
| 23306 Adamfields | 2001 AC_{20} | Adam Chaplin Fields, American winner of the 2007 Intel International Science and Engineering Fair (ISEF), (unrelated to American executive, entrepreneur Adam Fields) | JPL · 23306 |
| 23307 Alexramek | 2001 AG_{20} | Alex Shlomo Ramek, American winner of the 2007 Intel International Science and Engineering Fair (ISEF) | JPL · 23307 |
| 23308 Niyomsatian | 2001 AS_{21} | Korawich Niyomsatian, Thai winner of the 2007 Intel International Science and Engineering Fair (ISEF) and European Union Contest for Young Scientists (EUCYS) Award recipient | JPL · 23308 |
| 23310 Siriwon | 2001 AA_{25} | Natnaree Siriwon, Thai winner of the 2007 Intel International Science and Engineering Fair (ISEF) and European Union Contest for Young Scientists (EUCYS) Award recipient | JPL · 23310 |
| 23313 Supokaivanich | 2001 AC_{42} | Nathaphon Supokaivanich, Thai winner of the 2007 Intel International Science and Engineering Fair (ISEF) and European Union Contest for Young Scientists (EUCYS) Award recipient | JPL · 23313 |
| 23315 Navinbrian | 2001 BN_{8} | Navin Brian Ramakrishna, Singaporean finalist in the 2007 Intel International Science and Engineering Fair (ISEF) | JPL · 23315 |
| 23318 Salvadorsanchez | 2001 BT_{13} | Salvador Sánchez Martínez, Spanish (Catalan) amateur astronomer, Director of the Observatori Astronòmic de Mallorca. | JPL · 23318 |
| 23322 Duyingsewa | 2001 BW_{24} | Du Ying Sewa, Singaporean finalist in the 2007 Intel International Science and Engineering Fair (ISEF) | JPL · 23322 |
| 23323 Anand | 2001 BJ_{25} | Vikas Anand, American finalist in the 2007 Intel International Science and Engineering Fair (ISEF) | JPL · 23323 |
| 23324 Kwak | 2001 BW_{25} | Esther Bora Kwak, American finalist in the 2007 Intel International Science and Engineering Fair (ISEF) | JPL · 23324 |
| 23325 Arroyo | 2001 BK_{30} | Alejandro Arroyo, Mexican finalist in the 2007 Intel International Science and Engineering Fair (ISEF) | JPL · 23325 |
| 23327 Luchernandez | 2001 BE_{31} | Lucero Hernández, Mexican finalist in the 2007 Intel International Science and Engineering Fair (ISEF) | JPL · 23327 |
| 23329 Josevega | 2001 BP_{42} | José Carlos Vega, Mexican finalist in the 2007 Intel International Science and Engineering Fair (ISEF) | JPL · 23329 |
| 23331 Halimzeidan | 2001 BY_{43} | Sana Abdul Halim Zeidan, Lebanese finalist in the 2007 Intel International Science and Engineering Fair (ISEF) | JPL · 23331 |
| 23355 Elephenor | 9602 P-L | Elephenor, son of Chalcodon, led the Euboean Abantians against Troy, where he was killed by Agenor. | JPL · 23355 |
| 23382 Epistrophos | 4536 T-2 | Skhedios and Epistrophos led the men of Phocis against Troy. | JPL · 23382 |
| 23383 Schedios | 5146 T-2 | Schedios and Epistrophos led the men of Phocis against Troy. | JPL · 23383 |

== 23401–23500 ==
back to top

| Named minor planet | Provisional | This minor planet was named for... | Ref · Catalog |
|---|---|---|---|
| 23401 Brodskaya | 1968 OE_{1} | Vera Yakovlevna Brodskaya (born 1923) worked at the Pulkovo Observatory for more than 30 years. As librarian and curator of the library fund she was the initiator and main compiler of The Catalogue of editions of astronomical observatories of the world available in the Pulkovo Observatory library | JPL · 23401 |
| 23402 Turchina | 1969 TO_{2} | Galina Petrovna Turchina (born 1937), a Russian writer and dramatist | MPC · 23402 |
| 23403 Boudewijnbüch | 1971 FB | Boudewijn Maria Ignatius Büch (1948–2002) was a Dutch writer, poet and television presenter. He is well known for his successful novel De kleine blonde dood ("Little blond death", 1985), on which a film was based in 1993. The name was suggested by C. E. Koppeschaar | JPL · 23403 |
| 23404 Bomans | 1972 RG | Godfried Jan Arnold Bomans (1913–1971) was a popular Dutch author known for his books of modern-day fairy tales and his short, humorous pieces full of parody and acerbic wit. His young-adult fantasy novel Eric in the Land of the Insects (1940) was turned into a film in 2004. The name was suggested by L. E. Timmerman | JPL · 23404 |
| 23405 Nisyros | 1973 SB_{1} | Nisyros is the easternmost volcano of the Aegean arc of Greece. | JPL · 23405 |
| 23406 Kozlov | 1977 QO_{3} | Dmitrij Il'ich Kozlov (1919–), Russian engineer and scientist, winner of the Lenin Prize, of the State Prize twice, and the gold medal of the Association of Assistance to the National Industry of France | JPL · 23406 |
| 23408 Beijingaoyun | 1977 TU_{3} | Chinese for the Beijing Olympic Games, after the 2008 Beijing Olympics | JPL · 23408 |
| 23409 Derzhavin | 1978 QF_{1} | Gavrila Romanovich Derzhavin (1743–1816) was a great Russian poet, the immediate predecessor of Pushkin. In his verses he glorified the Russian war victories of the eighteenth century. He was also the author of striking satirical verses, as well as lyrics about love and landscapes | JPL · 23409 |
| 23410 Vikuznetsov | 1978 QK_{2} | Victor Ivanovich Kuznetsov (1913–1991) a Russian space engineer | JPL · 23410 |
| 23411 Bayanova | 1978 ST_{7} | Alla Nikolaevna Bayanova (Levitskaya) (1914–2011) is a Romanian, Soviet and Russian singer, performer of Russian songs and romances, author of music for many romances. | JPL · 23411 |
| 23418 Malmbäck | 1979 QM_{3} | Malmbäck, a small village in southern Sweden and the birthplace of the discoverer. | IAU · 23418 |
| 23436 Alekfursenko | 1982 UF_{8} | Aleksandr Fursenko (1927–2008), Russian historian | JPL · 23436 |
| 23437 Šíma | 1984 SJ_{1} | Josef Šíma (1891–1971) was a Czech imaginative, abstract and surrealist painter, who lived in France from 1921. His sources of inspiration spanned nature, crystals, cosmic visions, landscape and female bodies, to fascination by stories of ancient mythology such as Falling Icarus or Leda and the Swan | JPL · 23437 |
| 23443 Kikwaya | 1986 TG_{1} | Jean Baptiste Kikwaya Eluo (born 1965), a native of the Democratic Republic of Congo and Staff Astronomer at the Vatican Observatory. | JPL · 23443 |
| 23444 Kukučín | 1986 TV_{6} | Martin Kukučín (pseudonym of Matej Bencur), Slovak writer. | JPL · 23444 |
| 23448 Yasudatakeshi | 1988 BG | Takeshi Yasuda (born 1986), Japanese astronomer, director of the Himeji City Science Museum in Hyōgo Prefecture, Japan | IAU · 23448 |
| 23450 Birkenstock | 1988 CB_{4} | Charles Birkenstock (c. 1860–1928) was the director of the Bureau Central Météorique (founded in 1910) and the Société astronomique d´Anvers (founded in 1905). | JPL · 23450 |
| 23452 Drew | 1988 QF | Drew Barringer (born 1946), president of the Barringer Crater Company in Arizona where the Meteor Crater is located | JPL · 23452 |
| 23455 Fumi | 1988 XY_{4} | Fumi Yoshida (born 1966), a Japanese astronomer. She studied the size distributions of sub-kilometer asteroids with the Subaru Telescope at the Mauna Kea Observatory on Hawaii in collaboration with Tsuko Nakamura, who discovered this minor planet. | JPL · 23455 |
| 23457 Beiderbecke | 1989 GV_{6} | Bix Beiderbecke, jazz musician. | JPL · 23457 |
| 23465 Yamashitakouhei | 1989 UA_{1} | Kouhei Yamashita (born 1953) was the project manager of the successfully launched STARS-II nanosatellite, built at Kagawa University in Japan. He is also an astrophotographer of nebulae and star clusters. | IAU · 23465 |
| 23468 Kannabe | 1990 SS_{3} | Kannabe, a plateau in Toyooka city, Hyogo prefecture. JPL | MPC · 23468 |
| 23469 Neilpeart | 1990 SY_{3} | Neil Elwood Peart, Canadian drummer and lyricist for the band Rush | JPL · 23469 |
| 23471 Kawatamasaaki | 1990 TH_{3} | Masaaki Kawata (born 1964) is the director of the Oita Sekizaki Kaiseikan (Observatory and Museum). He makes nightly contributions to his local community by operating the observatory's 0.6-m reflector telescope and contributes to public outreach of astronomy. | IAU · 23471 |
| 23472 Rolfriekher | 1990 TZ_{10} | Rolf Riekher (1922–2020), a German optician and historian, author of "Telescopes and their Masters" (Fernrohre und ihre Meister). (Src) | JPL · 23472 |
| 23473 Voss | 1990 TD_{12} | Johann Heinrich Voss (1751–1826), a German philologist and poet | MPC · 23473 |
| 23475 Nakazawa | 1990 VM_{2} | Satoru Nakazawa (born 1969), an aerospace system engineer at the Japan Aerospace Exploration Agency (JAXA), who contributed to the Selenological and Engineering Explorer, Mercury Magnetospheric Orbiter, and Hayabusa2, which took samples from asteroid 162173 Ryugu. | IAU · 23475 |
| 23477 Wallenstadt | 1990 WS_{1} | Lake Walen, also known as Walensee or Lake Walenstadt, is one of the greater lakes in Switzerland. | JPL · 23477 |
| 23478 Chikumagawa | 1991 BZ | The Chikumagawa River originates in Nagano prefecture and flows through Niigata prefecture with many historic sites lying along it. Chikumagawa Ryojo no Uta (A poem of a journey along the River Chikuma) is a widely-known poem written by the prominent Japanese novelist and poet Shimazaki Toson. | JPL · 23478 |
| 23490 Monikohl | 1991 RK_{3} | Monika Kohl, German secretary of the documentation department of the Astronomisches Rechen-Institut for more than four decades | JPL · 23490 |
| 23495 Nagaotoshiko | 1991 UQ_{1} | Toshiko Nagao (1939–2021), was a Japanese amateur astronomer and astronomy communicator. She also assisted Kazuro Watanabe, who co-discovered this minor planet. | IAU · 23495 |

== 23501–23600 ==
back to top

| Named minor planet | Provisional | This minor planet was named for... | Ref · Catalog |
|---|---|---|---|
| 23504 Haneda | 1992 EX | Toshio Haneda (1910–1992), a Japanese comet hunter, discoverer of D/1978 R1 (Haneda-Campos) | JPL · 23504 |
| 23514 Schneider | 1992 RU | Reinhold Schneider, a German writer and essayist. | JPL · 23514 |
| 23520 Ludwigbechstein | 1992 SM_{26} | Ludwig Bechstein, German writer and collector of folk fairy tales. | JPL · 23520 |
| 23524 Yuichitsuda | 1993 BF_{3} | Yuichi Tsuda (born 1975) is a Japanese space engineer, pioneer of solar-sail technology used in the IKAROS mission, and project manager on the Hayabusa2 asteroid sample-return mission. | IAU · 23524 |
| 23543 Saiki | 1993 UK | Takanao Saiki (born 1976) is a Japanese aerospace engineering at the Institute of Space and Astronautical Science, who developed the Hayabusa2 impactor, which created an artificial crater on the surface of asteroid 162173 Ryugu in 2019. | IAU · 23543 |
| 23547 Tognelli | 1994 DG | Emanuele Tognelli (born 1981), an Italian astrophysicist at the Pistoia Mountains Astronomical Observatory in San Marcello Piteglio, Tuscany | MPC · 23547 |
| 23549 Epicles | 1994 ES_{6} | Epicles, a Lycian warrior fighting for the Trojan forces, was killed by Ajax, who hit him on the head with a heavy stone | JPL · 23549 |
| 23562 Hyodokenichi | 1994 TR_{1} | Kenichi Hyodo (born 1967) is a well-known amateur astronomer in Ehime Prefecture and keen observer and photographer of comets, nebulae and star clusters. He is currently a member of the Oriental Astronomical Association and Astronomical Society of Oita. | IAU · 23562 |
| 23564 Ungaretti | 1994 VX_{1} | Giuseppe Ungaretti (1888–1970), a poet of Hermeticism | JPL · 23564 |
| 23571 Zuaboni | 1995 AB | 23571 Zuaboni Discovered 1995 Jan. 1 by M. Cavagna and E. Galliani at Sormano. Patrizia Zuaboni (born 1958), an affectionate friend of both discoverers, contributed to the idea that they should get married | JPL · 23571 |
| 23578 Baedeker | 1995 DR_{13} | Karl Baedeker, German publisher. | JPL · 23578 |
| 23583 Křivský | 1995 SJ_{1} | Ladislav Křivský (1925–2007), a Czech astronomer and meteorologist | JPL · 23583 |
| 23587 Abukumado | 1995 TE_{8} | Abukuma-do, a limestone cave in eastern Fukushima prefecture | JPL · 23587 |
| 23589 Silvmellini | 1995 UR_{6} | Silvestro Mellini, Italian merchant ship captain who sailed the seas and oceans of the world. He is a passionate and knowledgeable amateur astronomer. Since retiring from seafaring, Silvestro has devoted himself to popularizing astronomy in schools and village squares on Elba, where he lives. | IAU · 23589 |
| 23591 Yanagisawa | 1995 UP_{44} | Yasufumi Yanagisawa (b. 1955) is a retired Japanese physics teacher at a high school who used his own astrophotographs in his physics classes to spark his students' interest in the universe. | IAU · 23591 |

== 23601–23700 ==
back to top

| Named minor planet | Provisional | This minor planet was named for... | Ref · Catalog |
|---|---|---|---|
| 23608 Alpiapuane | 1996 AC_{4} | Alpi Apuane, the marble mountains, are one of the most original relief areas in Italy, known for the variety of its landscape and environment. Its precious Carrara marble is known worldwide. The presence of ancient human settlements has left important historical and cultural witness. The name was suggested by M. Di Martino. | JPL · 23608 |
| 23612 Ramzel | 1996 BJ_{4} | Allen Lee Ramzel, defunct (?) observer and systems engineer for the team that discovered this object | JPL · 23612 |
| 23617 Duna | 1996 HM_{13} | Ancient name of the Daugava river, upon which the Latvian capital of Riga is built. | JPL · 23617 |
| 23625 Gelfond | 1996 WX | Alexandr Osipovich Gelfond (1906–1968) studied and taught mathematics at the University of Moscow. His main contributions were in the theory of interpolation and approximation of functions of a complex variable, in number theory and the study of transcendental numbers and in the history of mathematics. | JPL · 23625 |
| 23628 Ichimura | 1996 XZ_{31} | Yoshimi Ichimura (born 1952) is an active Japanese amateur astronomer and high-school teacher. He discovered comet C/1987 W1 (Ichimura), as well as the supernovae 2005lx, 2007ss, 2008A and 2008hi | JPL · 23628 |
| 23638 Nagano | 1997 AV_{6} | Nagano Prefecture lies in the center of Honshu Island, Japan. It shares borders with eight prefectures, the most in Japan. In 1998 the 18th Winter Olympic Games were held there. | JPL · 23638 |
| 23644 Yamaneko | 1997 AW_{17} | Yamaneko Group of Comet Observers. | JPL · 23644 |
| 23648 Kolář | 1997 CB | Czech amateur astronomer and telecommunication engineer Jan Kolář (born 1936) served for decades as chairman of the Optical Group of the Czech Astronomical Society and was elected an honorary fellow of the Society in 2001. He constructed "Bikukr", a pair of telescopes for high-quality deep-sky visual observation. | JPL · 23648 |
| 23649 Tohoku | 1997 CJ_{5} | Tohoku is the name of the northeastern part of Honshu island, Japan. The Great East Japan Earthquake of 2011 March 11 occurred offshore. About 25000 lives were lost and many facilities were demolished | JPL · 23649 |
| 23650 Čvančara | 1997 CU_{5} | Jaroslav Čvančara (born 1948), a Czech writer, historian and musician. | JPL · 23650 |
| 23662 Jozankei | 1997 ES_{17} | Jōzankei Dam, a hot spring and geoelectric dam in Sapporo, Japan. | IAU · 23662 |
| 23663 Kalou | 1997 EG_{18} | Nickname of the discoverer's wife, Caroline Meunie. | JPL · 23663 |
| 23667 Savinakim | 1997 FM_{4} | Savina Dine Kim (born 1994) is a finalist in the 2012 Intel Science Talent Search, a science competition for high-school seniors, for her biochemistry project. | JPL · 23667 |
| 23668 Eunbekim | 1997 FR_{4} | EunBe Kim (born 1993) is a finalist in the 2012 Intel Science Talent Search, a science competition for high-school seniors, for her biochemistry project. | JPL · 23668 |
| 23669 Huihuifan | 1997 FB_{5} | Huihui Fan (born 1994) is a finalist in the 2012 Intel Science Talent Search, a science competition for high-school seniors, for her plant-science project. | JPL · 23669 |
| 23672 Swiggum | 1997 GR_{21} | Leslie Swiggum mentored a finalist in the 2012 Intel Science Talent Search, a science competition for high-school seniors. | JPL · 23672 |
| 23673 Neilmehta | 1997 GB_{23} | Neil Kamlesh Mehta (born 1994) is a finalist in the 2012 Intel Science Talent Search, a science competition for high-school seniors, for his biochemistry project. | JPL · 23673 |
| 23674 Juliebaker | 1997 GJ_{23} | Julie Baker mentored a finalist in the 2012 Intel Science Talent Search, a science competition for high-school seniors. | JPL · 23674 |
| 23675 Zabinski | 1997 GU_{23} | Urszula Zabinski mentored a finalist in the 2012 Intel Science Talent Search, a science competition for high-school seniors. | JPL · 23675 |
| 23676 Tomitayoshihiro | 1997 GR_{25} | Yoshihiro Tomita (b. 1948), a Japanese amateur astronomer. | IAU · 23676 |
| 23679 Andrewmoore | 1997 GM_{33} | Andrew Moore mentored a finalist in the 2012 Intel Science Talent Search, a science competition for high-school seniors. | JPL · 23679 |
| 23680 Kerryking | 1997 GL_{34} | Kerry King mentored a finalist in the 2012 Intel Science Talent Search, a science competition for high-school seniors. | JPL · 23680 |
| 23681 Prabhu | 1997 GC_{36} | Anirudh Prabhu (born 1994) is a finalist in the 2012 Intel Science Talent Search, a science competition for high-school seniors, for his mathematics project. | JPL · 23681 |
| 23685 Toaldo | 1997 JV | Giuseppe Toaldo (1719–1797), Italian Catholic priest, meteorologist, agronomist, astronomer and physicist | MPC · 23685 |
| 23686 Songyuan | 1997 JZ_{7} | Songyuan, Jilin province, China | JPL · 23686 |
| 23688 Josephjoachim | 1997 JJ_{11} | Joseph Joachim (1831–1907) was a Hungarian violist, conductor and composer, and a close friend of Mendelssohn and Brahms. He is known for his revival of Bach's sonatas for violin solo | JPL · 23688 |
| 23689 Jancuypers | 1997 JC_{13} | Jan Cuypers (1956–2017) was an astronomer working at the Royal Observatory at Uccle. Involved in several public and astronomical duties at the observatory, he was very much appreciated by all his colleagues. | JPL · 23689 |
| 23690 Jiangwenhan | 1997 JD_{14} | Jiang Wenhan (born 1936), optical scientist and an Academician of Chinese Academy of Engineering. | JPL · 23690 |
| 23691 Jefneve | 1997 JN_{16} | Jef Neve (born 1977) is a Belgian jazz and classical music pianist. A 2000 graduate of the Lemmens Institute in Leuven, he wrote the soundtrack for the 2012 VRT series "In Vlaamse Velden" ("In Flandern Fields"). | JPL · 23691 |
| 23692 Nandatianwenners | 1997 KA | The graduates and faculties of the Department of Astronomy of Nanjing University ("Nanda") on the occasion of its 120th anniversary for their contribution to astronomy ("Tianwen", from the I Ching). | IAU · 23692 |
| 23699 Paulgordan | 1997 ND_{3} | Paul Gordan (1837–1912), German mathematician | JPL · 23699 |
| 23700 Maríagalán | 1997 OZ | María Galán Sánchez, dedicated Spanish humanitarian and co-founder of the NGO Babies Uganda. | IAU · 23700 |

== 23701–23800 ==
back to top

| Named minor planet | Provisional | This minor planet was named for... | Ref · Catalog |
|---|---|---|---|
| 23701 Liqibin | 1997 PC_{1} | Li Qibin (1936–2003), the director of the Beijing Astronomical Observatory (1987–1998) and twice president of the Chinese Astronomical Society (1989–1992 and 1995–1998). | JPL · 23701 |
| 23707 Chambliss | 1997 TZ_{7} | Carlson R. Chambliss (born 1941) is an astronomer and Emeritus Professor at Kutztown University in Kutztown, Pennsylvania. He has written books on numismatics, philately, and blackjack, and created and sponsored numerous awards in his name honoring achievements in academia and science, especially astronomy. | JPL · 23707 |
| 23712 Willpatrick | 1998 AA | William Patrick Dillon (born 1992), son of the American discoverers Elizabeth and William G. Dillon. He was with them on the discovery night: "Daddy, I want to go home now. This place is cold and spooky." "Just one more image, son. Keep your eyes on the heavens!" | JPL · 23712 |
| 23717 Kaddoura | 1998 FW_{118} | Deena Wafic Kaddoura, Lebanese finalist in the 2007 Intel International Science and Engineering Fair (ISEF) | JPL · 23717 |
| 23718 Horgos | 1998 GO_{10} | Horgoš, a Serbian village near the border to Hungary, where the second discoverer, László L. Kiss grew up. The population is mainly Hungarian and numbers almost 8000. | JPL · 23718 |
| 23722 Gulak | 1998 HD_{32} | Benjamin Poss Gulak, Canadian finalist in the 2007 Intel International Science and Engineering Fair (ISEF) | JPL · 23722 |
| 23727 Akihasan | 1998 HO_{52} | Akihasan mountain is located north of Nanyo-city, Yamagata prefecture, Japan. The mountain is popular as a hiking course | JPL · 23727 |
| 23728 Jasonmorrow | 1998 HV_{63} | Jason Charles Morrow, Canadian finalist in the 2007 Intel International Science and Engineering Fair (ISEF) | JPL · 23728 |
| 23729 Kemeisha | 1998 HH_{80} | Kemeisha Latoya Nastasia Patterson, American finalist in the 2007 Intel International Science and Engineering Fair (ISEF) | JPL · 23729 |
| 23730 Suncar | 1998 HX_{89} | Jonathan Kelvin Suncar, American finalist in the 2007 Intel International Science and Engineering Fair (ISEF) | JPL · 23730 |
| 23732 Choiseungjae | 1998 HV_{95} | Choi Seung Jae, Chinese finalist in the 2007 Intel International Science and Engineering Fair (ISEF) | JPL · 23732 |
| 23733 Hyojiyun | 1998 HE_{123} | Hyo Ji Yun, Chinese finalist in the 2007 Intel International Science and Engineering Fair (ISEF) | JPL · 23733 |
| 23734 Kimgyehyun | 1998 HK_{124} | Kim Gye Hyun, Chinese finalist in the 2007 Intel International Science and Engineering Fair (ISEF) | JPL · 23734 |
| 23735 Cohen | 1998 HM_{134} | Julia Lynn Cohen, American finalist in the 2007 Intel International Science and Engineering Fair (ISEF) | JPL · 23735 |
| 23738 van Zyl | 1998 JZ_{1} | Jakob "Japie" van Zyl (1957–2020) was a pioneer in understanding the Earth system using remote sensing data. A prolific researcher, passionate mentor, and outstanding leader, Jakob rose throughout his 33-year JPL career to become Director of Solar System Exploration and associate director of JPL for Strategy. | IAU · 23738 |
| 23739 Kevin | 1998 KS_{1} | Kevin Schindler (born 1964) is outreach manager at Lowell Observatory. He oversees all aspects of Lowell's education and outreach programs, including personnel, programming, exhibits and gift shop | JPL · 23739 |
| 23741 Takaaki | 1998 KB_{4} | Takaaki Noguchi (born 1961), a professor at Ibaraki University, Bunkyo, Japan. | JPL · 23741 |
| 23742 Okadatatsuaki | 1998 KW_{4} | Tatsuaki Okada (born 1968), an associate professor at the Institute of Space and Astronautical Science, JAXA. | JPL · 23742 |
| 23743 Toshikasuga | 1998 KT_{6} | Toshihiro Kasuga (born 1977), an astronomer at the National Astronomical Observatory of Japan. | JPL · 23743 |
| 23744 Ootsubo | 1998 KX_{6} | Takafumi Ootsubo (born 1970), an associate professor at Tohoku University. | JPL · 23744 |
| 23745 Liadawley | 1998 KZ_{15} | Lia Elgia Dawley, American finalist in the 2007 Intel International Science and Engineering Fair (ISEF) | JPL · 23745 |
| 23747 Rahaelgupta | 1998 KW_{25} | Rahael Rohini Gupta, American finalist in the 2007 Intel International Science and Engineering Fair (ISEF) | JPL · 23747 |
| 23748 Kaarethode | 1998 KF_{28} | Kaare Thode Jørgensen, Danish finalist in the 2007 Intel International Science and Engineering Fair (ISEF) | JPL · 23748 |
| 23749 Thygesen | 1998 KL_{30} | Jakob Refer Thygesen, Danish finalist in the 2007 Intel International Science and Engineering Fair (ISEF) | JPL · 23749 |
| 23750 Stepciechan | 1998 KQ_{35} | Stephanie Fulane Chan, American finalist in the 2007 Intel International Science and Engineering Fair (ISEF) | JPL · 23750 |
| 23751 Davidprice | 1998 KL_{37} | David Michael Price, American finalist in the 2007 Intel International Science and Engineering Fair (ISEF) | JPL · 23751 |
| 23752 Jacobshapiro | 1998 KB_{41} | Jacob J. Shapiro, American finalist in the 2007 Intel International Science and Engineering Fair (ISEF) | JPL · 23752 |
| 23753 Busdicker | 1998 KP_{41} | Elizabeth Wells Busdicker, American finalist in the 2007 Intel International Science and Engineering Fair (ISEF) | JPL · 23753 |
| 23754 Rachnareddy | 1998 KV_{46} | Rachna Beeravolu Reddy, American finalist in the 2007 Intel International Science and Engineering Fair (ISEF) | JPL · 23754 |
| 23755 Sergiolozano | 1998 KY_{46} | Sergio Lozano, American finalist in the 2007 Intel International Science and Engineering Fair (ISEF) | JPL · 23755 |
| 23756 Daniellozano | 1998 KE_{47} | Daniel Lozano, American finalist in the 2007 Intel International Science and Engineering Fair (ISEF) | JPL · 23756 |
| 23757 Jonmunoz | 1998 KL_{48} | Jonathan Muñoz, American finalist in the 2007 Intel International Science and Engineering Fair (ISEF) | JPL · 23757 |
| 23758 Guyuzhou | 1998 KG_{51} | Gu Yuzhou, Chinese finalist in the 2007 Intel International Science and Engineering Fair (ISEF) | JPL · 23758 |
| 23759 Wangzhaoxin | 1998 KS_{56} | Wang Zhaoxin, Chinese finalist in the 2007 Intel International Science and Engineering Fair (ISEF) | JPL · 23759 |
| 23761 Yangliqing | 1998 KJ_{63} | Yang Liqing, Chinese finalist in the 2007 Intel International Science and Engineering Fair (ISEF) | JPL · 23761 |
| 23768 Abu-Rmaileh | 1998 MT_{32} | Muhammad Akef Abu-Rmaileh, American finalist in the 2007 Discovery Channel Young Scientist Challenge (DCYSC) | JPL · 23768 |
| 23769 Russellbabb | 1998 MP_{33} | Russell S. Babb, American finalist in the 2007 Discovery Channel Young Scientist Challenge (DCYSC) | JPL · 23769 |
| 23771 Emaitchar | 1998 MR_{37} | Martin H. Robinson (born 1952) is a clinical oncologist, based in Sheffield, U.K. An enthusiastic amateur astronomer, he was for many years clinical director of Weston Park Hospital. The name derives from transliteration of his initials (MHR), by which he is known to his colleagues. | JPL · 23771 |
| 23772 Masateru | 1998 MU_{37} | Masateru Ishiguro (born 1971), an assistant professor at Seoul National University. | JPL · 23772 |
| 23773 Sarugaku | 1998 MV_{37} | Yuki Sarugaku (born 1978), now at the Japan Aerospace Exploration Agency, Tokyo, recently completed his doctoral dissertation at the University of Tokyo on the dust trails of comets. | JPL · 23773 |
| 23774 Herbelliott | 1998 MZ_{41} | Herb Elliott (born 1938), Australian athlete who won gold by a wide margin in the 1500-m at the 1960 Olympics with a record that stood for seven years. At 22 he retired having never been beaten over the mile equivalent distance. He has been voted by his peers as history's greatest middle-distance runner. | JPL · 23774 |
| 23775 Okudaira | 1998 PE | Kyoko Okudaira (born 1973), a Japanese planetary scientist. | JPL · 23775 |
| 23776 Gosset | 1998 QE | William Sealy Gosset (1876–1937), British mathematician and chemist at Oxford. His most important contribution, published under the pseudonym "Student", was the derivation of a statistic, known as "t", that plays a central role in tests of hypotheses based on the analysis of small samples. | JPL · 23776 |
| 23777 Goursat | 1998 QT_{5} | Édouard Goursat (1858–1936), French mathematician who made contributions to many areas of mathematical analysis. He was associated with several French universities and was regarded as an outstanding teacher. His monumental Cours d´analyse mathématique (1900–1910) was used by generations of students. | JPL · 23777 |
| 23779 Cambier | 1998 QL_{10} | Colleen Siobahn Cambier, American finalist in the 2007 Discovery Channel Young Scientist Challenge (DCYSC) | JPL · 23779 |
| 23783 Alyssachan | 1998 QG_{12} | Alyssa Lauren Chan, American finalist in the 2007 Discovery Channel Young Scientist Challenge (DCYSC) | JPL · 23783 |
| 23788 Cofer | 1998 QT_{18} | Evan Mitchell Cofer, American finalist in the 2007 Discovery Channel Young Scientist Challenge (DCYSC) | JPL · 23788 |
| 23791 Kaysonconlin | 1998 QX_{21} | Kayson Levi Conlin, American finalist in the 2007 Discovery Channel Young Scientist Challenge (DCYSC) | JPL · 23791 |
| 23792 Alyssacook | 1998 QU_{24} | Alyssa Noel Cook, American finalist in the 2007 Discovery Channel Young Scientist Challenge (DCYSC) | JPL · 23792 |
| 23798 Samagonzalez | 1998 QL_{37} | Samantha Gonzalez, American finalist in the 2007 Discovery Channel Young Scientist Challenge (DCYSC) | JPL · 23798 |

== 23801–23900 ==
back to top

| Named minor planet | Provisional | This minor planet was named for... | Ref · Catalog |
|---|---|---|---|
| 23801 Erikgustafson | 1998 QQ_{38} | Erik Olaf Gustafson, a finalist in the 2007 Discovery Channel Young Scientist Challenge (DCYSC), a middle school science competition, for his environmental sciences project. | JPL · 23801 |
| 23804 Haber | 1998 QR_{39} | Catherine Michelle Haber, a finalist in the 2007 Discovery Channel Young Scientist Challenge (DCYSC), a middle school science competition, for her behavioral science project. | JPL · 23804 |
| 23808 Joshuahammer | 1998 QL_{42} | Joshua Wayne Hammer, a finalist in the 2007 Discovery Channel Young Scientist Challenge (DCYSC), a middle school science competition, for his biochem, medicine, health, and microbiology project. | JPL · 23808 |
| 23809 Haswell | 1998 QC_{44} | John Douglas Reiji Haswell, a finalist in the 2007 Discovery Channel Young Scientist Challenge (DCYSC), a middle school science competition, for his biochem, medicine, health, and microbiology project. | JPL · 23809 |
| 23811 Connorivens | 1998 QB_{46} | Connor Joseph Ivens, a finalist in the 2007 Discovery Channel Young Scientist Challenge (DCYSC), a middle school science competition, for his physical science project. | JPL · 23811 |
| 23812 Jannuzi | 1998 QR_{46} | Brigg Lowell Jannuzi, a finalist in the 2007 Discovery Channel Young Scientist Challenge (DCYSC), a middle school science competition, for his earth and space science project. | JPL · 23812 |
| 23814 Bethanylynne | 1998 QE_{49} | Bethany Lynne Johnson, a finalist in the 2007 Discovery Channel Young Scientist Challenge (DCYSC), a middle school science competition, for her biochem, medicine, health, and microbiology project. | JPL · 23814 |
| 23816 Rohitkamat | 1998 QF_{50} | Rohit G. Kamat, a finalist in the 2007 Discovery Channel Young Scientist Challenge (DCYSC), a middle school science competition, for his botany and zoology project. | JPL · 23816 |
| 23817 Gokulk | 1998 QX_{50} | Gokul Krishnan, a finalist in the 2007 Discovery Channel Young Scientist Challenge (DCYSC), a middle school science competition, for his biochem, medicine, health, and microbiology project. | JPL · 23817 |
| 23818 Matthewlepow | 1998 QZ_{50} | Matthew Brice Lepow, a finalist in the 2007 Discovery Channel Young Scientist Challenge (DCYSC), a middle school science competition, for his earth and space science project. | JPL · 23818 |
| 23819 Tsuyoshi | 1998 QK_{54} | Tsuyoshi Terai (born 1983), Japanese researcher, of the National Astronomical Observatory of Japan. | JPL · 23819 |
| 23821 Morganmonroe | 1998 QZ_{69} | Morgan McKay Monroe, a finalist in the 2007 Discovery Channel Young Scientist Challenge (DCYSC), a middle school science competition, for her physical science project. | JPL · 23821 |
| 23831 Mattmooney | 1998 QK_{86} | Matthew Michael Mooney, a finalist in the 2007 Discovery Channel Young Scientist Challenge (DCYSC), a middle school science competition, for his environmental sciences project. | JPL · 23831 |
| 23833 Mowers | 1998 QS_{90} | Christopher Scott Mowers, a finalist in the 2007 Discovery Channel Young Scientist Challenge (DCYSC), a middle school science competition, for his physical science project. | JPL · 23833 |
| 23834 Mukhopadhyay | 1998 QW_{90} | Prithwis Kumar Mukhopadhyay, a finalist in the 2007 Discovery Channel Young Scientist Challenge (DCYSC), a middle school science competition, for his environmental sciences project. | JPL · 23834 |
| 23837 Matthewnanni | 1998 QY_{93} | Matthew James Nanni, a finalist in the 2007 Discovery Channel Young Scientist Challenge (DCYSC), a middle school science competition, for his botany and zoology project. | JPL · 23837 |
| 23844 Raghvendra | 1998 QB_{109} | Shubha Srinivas Raghvendra, a finalist in the 2007 Discovery Channel Young Scientist Challenge (DCYSC), a middle school science competition, for her behavioral science project. | JPL · 23844 |
| 23850 Ramaswami | 1998 RJ_{34} | Keshav Ramaswami, a finalist in the 2007 Discovery Channel Young Scientist Challenge (DCYSC), a middle school science competition, for his biochem, medicine, health, and microbiology project. | JPL · 23850 |
| 23851 Rottman-Yang | 1998 RZ_{34} | Jaron Shalom Rottman-Yang, a finalist in the 2007 Discovery Channel Young Scientist Challenge (DCYSC), a middle school science competition, for his biochem, medicine, health, and microbiology project. | JPL · 23851 |
| 23852 Laurierumker | 1998 RN_{35} | Laurie Ann Rumker, a finalist in the 2007 Discovery Channel Young Scientist Challenge (DCYSC), a middle school science competition, for her biochem, medicine, health, and microbiology project. | JPL · 23852 |
| 23854 Rickschaffer | 1998 RD_{40} | Rick Schinco Schaffer, a finalist in the 2007 Discovery Channel Young Scientist Challenge (DCYSC), a middle school science competition, for his botany and zoology project. | JPL · 23854 |
| 23855 Brandonshih | 1998 RD_{44} | Brandon H. Shih, a finalist in the 2007 Discovery Channel Young Scientist Challenge (DCYSC), a middle school science competition, for his environmental sciences project. | JPL · 23855 |
| 23858 Ambrosesoehn | 1998 RG_{53} | Ambrose Geoffrey Soehn, a finalist in the 2007 Discovery Channel Young Scientist Challenge (DCYSC), a middle school science competition, for his physical science project. | JPL · 23858 |
| 23861 Benjaminsong | 1998 RM_{58} | Benjamin Paul Song, American finalist in the 2007 Discovery Channel Young Scientist Challenge (DCYSC), a middle school science competition, for his biochem, medicine, health, and microbiology project. | JPL · 23861 |
| 23865 Karlsorensen | 1998 RK_{65} | Karl Mikael Sorensen, American finalist in the 2007 Discovery Channel Young Scientist Challenge (DCYSC), a middle school science competition, for his botany and zoology project. | JPL · 23865 |
| 23867 Cathsoto | 1998 RG_{71} | Catherine Soto, American finalist in the 2007 Discovery Channel Young Scientist Challenge (DCYSC), a middle school science competition, for her biochem, medicine, health, and microbiology project. | JPL · 23867 |
| 23871 Ousha | 1998 RC_{76} | Ousha bint Khalifa Al Suwaidi, an Emirati poet, considered one of the finest poets of the Nabati tradition and a notable female poet in the Arab world. the UAE's MBR Explorer will fly by the asteroid in 2032. | JPL · 23871 |
| 23875 Strube | 1998 RC_{77} | Katherine Michaela Strube, American finalist in the 2007 Discovery Channel Young Scientist Challenge (DCYSC), a middle school science competition, for her physical science project. | JPL · 23875 |
| 23877 Gourmaud | 1998 SP | Jamy Gourmaud, French journalist, co-host of the television science program C'est pas sorcier (see also 23882, 23890) | JPL · 23877 |
| 23879 Demura | 1998 SX_{4} | Hirohide Demura, Japanese lunar and planetary scientist. | JPL · 23879 |
| 23880 Tongil | 1998 SG_{5} | Korean reunification (Tongil is the Korean word for reunification). The asteroid was named with the hope for an early reunification of the southern and northern parts of Korea, divided since 1945. It was the first minor-planet discovery by a Korean amateur astronomer. Src | MPC · 23880 |
| 23882 Fredcourant | 1998 SC_{12} | Frédéric "Fred" Courant, French journalist, co-host of the television science program C'est pas sorcier (see also 23877, 23890) | JPL · 23882 |
| 23884 Karenharvey | 1998 SY_{12} | Karen Lorraine Harvey (born 1942; née Angle), an American astrophysicist who has investigated extensively the relationship of solar magnetic fields to coronal heating, x-ray emission, large active regions, ephemeral active regions and the solar cycle. Her work has provided fundamental statistical data on the nature and evolution of the solar magnetic field. She is married to American astrophysicist John Warren Harvey. | JPL · 23884 |
| 23886 Toshihamane | 1998 SV_{23} | Toshihiko Hamane (born 1963), curator of the Gunma Astronomical Observatory (D80) in Japan. He assisted Yoshihide Kozai, director of GAO from 1997 to 2012, especially in the field of school education of astronomy and planetary science. He is also a popularizer of astronomy. | JPL · 23886 |
| 23887 Shinsukeabe | 1998 SA_{24} | Shinsuke Abe (born 1970), a pioneer in modern meteoroid and asteroid research. | JPL · 23887 |
| 23888 Daikinoshita | 1998 SZ_{24} | Kinoshita Daisuke (born 1974), of the Institute of Astronomy at the National Central University, Taiwan, studies asteroids and comets. He has also worked on instrumentation and operations at Lulin Observatory, and has contributed to the development of astronomy in Taiwan. | JPL · 23888 |
| 23889 Hermanngrassmann | 1998 SC_{28} | Hermann Grassmann (1809–1877), German mathematician, physicist, linguist, scholar, and neohumanist. His interests included Sanskrit, phonetics and theology. He was also a very inventive mathematician. His researches in noncommutative algebraic systems foreshadowed the development of the vector calculus and n-dimensional spaces. | JPL · 23889 |
| 23890 Quindou | 1998 SO_{35} | Sabine Quindou, French journalist, co-host of the television science program C'est pas sorcier (see also 23877, 23882) | JPL · 23890 |
| 23893 Lauman | 1998 SL_{54} | Stephen W. Lauman (born 1974), an instrument maker at Lowell Observatory. | JPL · 23893 |
| 23894 Arikahiguchi | 1998 SM_{56} | Arika Higuchi (born 1979), a Japanese theoretical astronomer. | JPL · 23894 |
| 23895 Akikonakamura | 1998 SH_{58} | Akiko Nakamura (born 1964), a Japanese experimentalist in the field of planetary science. | JPL · 23895 |
| 23896 Tatsuaki | 1998 SF_{59} | Tatsuaki Hashimoto (born 1963) works on spacecraft guidance and control at the Institute of Space and Astronautical Science, Tokyo. He was engaged in the attitude and orbit control systems of spacecraft such as the Hayabusa sample return mission to asteroid Itokawa. | JPL · 23896 |
| 23897 Daikuroda | 1998 SA_{60} | Kuroda Daisuke (born 1977), an astronomer at the National Astronomical Observatory of Japan. | JPL · 23897 |
| 23898 Takir | 1998 SG_{60} | Driss Takir (born 1973), a postdoctoral fellow in the Department of Physics and Astronomy at Ithaca College. | JPL · 23898 |
| 23899 Kornoš | 1998 SE_{61} | Leonard Kornoš (born 1956), a lecturer at the Comenius University in Bratislava. | JPL · 23899 |
| 23900 Urakawa | 1998 SO_{61} | Seitaro Urakawa (born 1975), an astronomer who works at the Bisei Spaceguard Center. | JPL · 23900 |

== 23901–24000 ==
back to top

| Named minor planet | Provisional | This minor planet was named for... | Ref · Catalog |
|---|---|---|---|
| 23904 Amytang | 1998 SE_{70} | Amy B. Tang, American finalist in the 2007 Discovery Channel Young Scientist Challenge (DCYSC) | JPL · 23904 |
| 23922 Tawadros | 1998 SR_{135} | Kyrillos Bahaa Tawadros, American finalist in the 2007 Discovery Channel Young Scientist Challenge (DCYSC) | JPL · 23922 |
| 23924 Premt | 1998 SX_{140} | Prem Poothatta Thottumkara, American finalist in the 2007 Discovery Channel Young Scientist Challenge (DCYSC) | JPL · 23924 |
| 23928 Darbywoodard | 1998 ST_{160} | Darby Elizabeth Woodard, American finalist in the 2007 Discovery Channel Young Scientist Challenge (DCYSC) | JPL · 23928 |
| 23931 Ibuki | 1998 SV_{164} | Ibuki Kawamoto (born 1979), an administrative associate at the Center for Computational Astrophysics. | JPL · 23931 |
| 23937 Delibes | 1998 TR_{15} | Léo Delibes, 19th-century French composer of ballets and operas, whose works accompanied many observing nights in the control room of the telescope with which this minor planet was discovered | JPL · 23937 |
| 23938 Kurosaki | 1998 TR_{33} | Hirohisa Kurosaki (born 1970), of the Japan Aerospace Explorarion Agency, works on asteroids, space debris and remote sensing. He has discovered many asteroids. | JPL · 23938 |
| 23944 Dusser | 1998 UR_{3} | Raymond Dusser (1933–2006), a French amateur astronomer and jazz music specialist | JPL · 23944 |
| 23946 Marcelleroux | 1998 UL_{6} | Marcel Le roux (born 1930), a Belgian amateur astronomer and astrophotographer | JPL · 23946 |
| 23949 Dazapata | 1998 UP_{21} | Danielle Zapata, American finalist in the 2007 Discovery Channel Young Scientist Challenge (DCYSC) | JPL · 23949 |
| 23950 Tsusakamoto | 1998 UM_{24} | Tsuyoshi Sakamoto (born 1975), a researcher at the Japan Spaceguard Association. | JPL · 23950 |
| 23955 Nishikota | 1998 UO_{44} | Kota Nishiyama (Nishiyama Kota, born 1965), an astronomer who works at the Bisei Spacegaurd Center of Japan | JPL · 23955 |
| 23958 Theronice | 1998 VD_{30} | Theronice, princess and daughter of King Dexamenus of Olenus, and mother of Achean leader Amphimachus. | JPL · 23958 |
| 23975 Akran | 1999 CU_{81} | Erkan Akran, American mentor of a 2007 Discovery Channel Young Scientist Challenge (DCYSC) finalist | JPL · 23975 |
| 23980 Ogden | 1999 JA_{124} | Kristen Ogden, American mentor of a 2007 Discovery Channel Young Scientist Challenge (DCYSC) finalist | JPL · 23980 |
| 23981 Patjohnson | 1999 LC_{4} | Patricia Johnson, American mentor of a 2007 Discovery Channel Young Scientist Challenge (DCYSC) finalist | JPL · 23981 |
| 23988 Maungakiekie | 1999 RB | Maungakiekie (One Tree Hill), volcanic cone which dominates the skyline of Auckland, New Zealand | JPL · 23988 |
| 23989 Farpoint | 1999 RF | Farpoint Observatory, Kansas | JPL · 23989 |
| 23990 Springsteen | 1999 RM_{1} | Bruce Springsteen, American singer and songwriter (whose music entertained the discoverers on the night of discovery) | JPL · 23990 |
| 23992 Markhobbs | 1999 RO_{11} | Mark Hobbs, American mentor of a 2007 Discovery Channel Young Scientist Challenge (DCYSC) finalist | JPL · 23992 |
| 23994 Mayhan | 1999 RA_{14} | Rosemarie Mayhan, American mentor of a 2007 Discovery Channel Young Scientist Challenge (DCYSC) finalist | JPL · 23994 |
| 23995 Oechsle | 1999 RX_{17} | Janet Oechsle, American mentor of a 2007 Discovery Channel Young Scientist Challenge (DCYSC) finalist | JPL · 23995 |
| 23999 Rinner | 1999 RA_{33} | Claudine Rinner (born 1965), a French amateur astronomer and a discoverer of minor planets at Ottmarsheim Observatory. She also obtains rotational light-curves from photometric observations. | JPL · 23999 |
| 24000 Patrickdufour | 1999 RB_{33} | Patrick Dufour (born 1968), a French amateur astronomer and developer of tools and software for astronomy. He is working on robotics in astronomy together with Laurent Bernasconi, who discovered this minor planet. | JPL · 24000 |

back to top

| Preceded by 22,001–23,000 | Meanings of minor-planet names List of minor planets: 23,001–24,000 | Succeeded by 24,001–25,000 |
