= Max Bird (comedian) =

French stand-up comedian

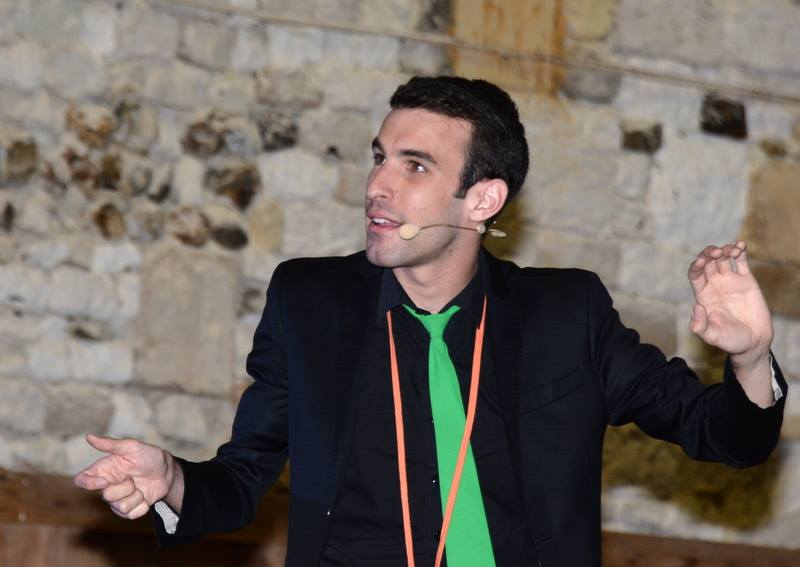
- Bird in 2016
- Born: Maxime Déchelle; 26 May 1990 (age 35); Tours, France

YouTube information
- Channel: Max Bird
- Subscribers: 725 thousand
- Views: 73.6 million
- Last updated: September 2, 2024

Maxime Déchelle (French pronunciation: [maksim deʃɛl]; born 26 May 1990) is a French comedian, populariser of science and YouTuber known by his stage name Max Bird. An amateur ornithologist, he started doing comedy before creating his YouTube channel in 2016, and thereafter quickly grew in popularity. He is also an environmental activist.

== Life ==
Born in Tours on 26 May 1990, Maxime Déchelle is the son of a French Air Force serviceman. In 2005, his father was transferred to Kourou in French Guiana, where Déchelle met William Van de Walle (future YouTuber known as Doc Seven) and obtained a baccalauréat in science. Passionate about biology and especially ornithology (hence his future stage name), the young man allowed himself a gap year to take pictures of the Amazonian rainforest wildlife.

In 2009, Maxime Déchelle moved to Paris to study biology. In the end, he decided to devote himself to show business: after training at the Cours Florent theatre school, he took the stage in some Paris theatres in 2012. He also took part in comedy competitions such as the TV show On n'demande qu'à en rire (in its third season).

With the support of French impressionist Gérald Dahan, Max Bird soon stood out among the other young stand-up comedians with his skits full of scientific knowledge, which he performed with a Jim Carrey-like exuberant behaviour. This led him to win top prize at the Tournon-sur-Rhône National Comedy Festival in 2014.

In 2015, he created a one-man show called L'Encyclo-spectacle (the Encyclopedic Show), produced by Pierre-Alexandre Vertadier. The following year, he launched a YouTube channel about science popularisation in order to demystify various common misconceptions with humour. Thanks to Doc Seven's publicity, he gathered 100,000 followers in one weekend; in June 2018, he had 470,000 followers. Jamy Gourmaud, former TV host of the French educational show C'est pas sorcier, was a guest in one of his videos. Max Bird's first book, Max Bird dézingue les idées reçues (Max Bird Shoots Down Common Misconceptions) came out in October 2017, published by First. The book, which sold 200,000 copies, was described by its author as being supplementary to his YouTube channel, For Christmas 2018, the YouTuber released 13,000 copies of a new board game, Max Bird, le jeu (Max Bird, the Game).

In addition to his career in comedy and video-making, Max Bird is an activist for ecology: in August 2018, he took part in a trip to Tanzania along with other YouTubers (among them Doc Seven) with the aim of promoting search engine Ecosia, which participates in reforestation. In September of the same year, he took a stand against the mining project in Montagne d'or, French Guiana, in one of his Common Misconceptions videos. Among other things, he condemned the ecological catastrophe, the faulty arguments in defence of mining and suggests using the money to create sustainable jobs instead. In December, he was one of many media personalities featured in a video, L'affaire du siècle (The scandal of the century), warning about the current climate catastrophe and associating with 4 non-governmental organisations to file a complaint against the State for inaction against global warming. He criticised the French State's irresponsibility and the influence of lobbyists, and lamented that no concrete measures were being taken.
