= Pheidas (mythology) =

In Greek mythology, Pheidas (Ancient Greek: Φείδας means 'sparing, thrifty') was an Athenian who participated in the Trojan War. During the battle, he supported their leader Menestheus against the Trojan hero Hector.

== See also ==
- Naming citation for Jovian asteroid 23135 Pheidas
