= France Channel =

Online digital video subscription service

- Website type: OTT platform
- Available in: English; French
- No. of locations: 1
- Area served: United Kingdom; United States
- Founder: Julien Verley
- Key people: Julien Verley (CEO for France Channel)
- Industry: Entertainment, Internet
- Products: Streaming media; Video on demand
- Services: Film distribution; Television distribution
- Parent: France Channels, SAS
- Website: francechannel.tv
- Registration: Required
- Launched: 21 August 2021; 5 years ago (United States)
- Current status: Active

France Channel is an online digital video subscription service, founded by Julien Verley (former executive of Canal+ Group and France Télévisions), operating in the United States and the United Kingdom but headquartered in France.

== History ==
=== Background ===
==== Rise of streaming and success of BritBox ====
Due to the rising popularity of Subscription Video on Demand services (SVODs), commonly known as streaming services, such as Netflix and Amazon Prime Video, around the world, especially among younger demographics, traditional TV has had to adapt in a changing market to appeal to younger generations in fear of being left in the dust by the SVOD services. In response to this, various European public service broadcasters (PSBs), have had to put many old rivalries aside in favor of collaborations in an attempt to compete against SVODs with their streaming services being launched often in their on countries. Most notable services are Joyn (joint-venture between ProSiebenSat.1 Media and Discovery, Inc. with ProSiebenSat.1 Media taking full ownership later on) launched for the domestic market in Germany, Salto (launched through the collaboration of TF1 Group, M6 Group, and France Télévisions before being closed in 2023) launched for the domestic market in France, and BritBox (originally a joint venture between BBC and ITV until ITV took complete control of the UK service in 2022 and the operations of the international service being completely transferred to BBC Studios, under BBC, in 2024) launched for both the domestic market in the United Kingdom and in various international markets starting with the United States, but later expanding to Canada, Australia, South Africa, and the Nordic countries. In 2020, it was announced that BritBox alone reached over 1 million subscribers in North America (US and Canada only).

=== Launch of France Channel ===
==== Initial launch ====
After the success of BritBox internationally, especially in the United States, Julien Verley (former executive of Canal+ Group and France Télévisions) founded France Channels, SAS with the intent of launching a "French version of BritBox" aimed at international markets, but with French media content being on the platform with English and French subtitles and with some content also being dubbed in English. This is an effort to promote French culture and media abroad, similar to how BritBox does the same with British media and culture. The company also struck a deal with NetGem to provide the technology for its distribution platform. Originally slated for Spring 2021, but later pushed back to August 2021, the service launched in the United States with content partnerships with Canal+ Group (now Canal+ S.A.), France Télévisions, TF1 Group, France Médias Monde, M6 Group, and Arte France. Under the partnership with France Médias Monde, subscribers are able to watch livestreams of both the English and the French versions of France 24. In October 2025, the Spanish version of France 24 was made available onto the France Channel platform, with the official launch/announcement occurring on 17 November 2025.

On 10 September 2026, France Channel was officially launched in the United Kingdom, with a launch on Amazon Prime Video Channels occurring earlier in the year on 25 June 2026.

==== Availability ====
In June 2023, the France Channel launched as a Subscription channel on Amazon Prime Video. France Channel is also available as a Subscription channel on The Roku Channel.

==== Partnerships ====
In November 2026, France Channel and the film-criticism website Cinema International announced a cross-promotion partnership: Cinema International publishes articles on France Channel's programming, and the Facebook page Sous le ciel de Paris shares its clips and news.

== Content and programming ==
Various French TV shows, movies, documentaries, and live TV networks appear on France Channel.

=== Live TV networks ===
- France 24 (English and French versions only at launch; Spanish version since October 2025)

=== Movies and documentaries ===
- A Year in My Life (Le Temps des Porte-Plumes)
- The Case (Villa Caprice)
- Cheating Love (On va s'aimer)
- Dr Knock (Knock)
- Palais Royal!
- A Parisienne (Une Parisienne)
- A Real Job (Un Métier Sérieux)
- They Came Back (Les Revenants)
- The Together Project (The Aquatic Effect/L'Effet Aquatique)
- War of the Buttons (La Guerre des boutons)

=== TV shows and docu-series ===
- The Accursed Kings (1972 miniseries) (Les Rois Maudits)
- Accused (French Version) (Accusé)
- Arrogant (Connasse)
- Barbapapa (Barbapapa)
- Bertrand (Il revient quand Bertrand ?)
- Blame it on Rousseau (La Faute à Rousseau)
- Chronicles Of The Sun (Un si Grand Soleil)
- Dates That Made History (Quand l'histoire fait dates)
- The Fragrance of Happiness (Le Parfum du bonheur)
- Joséphine, Guardian Angel (Joséphine, Ange Gardien)
- The Kings of France (Les Rois de France)
- Little Brown Bear (Petit Ours Brun)
- The Little Prince (Le Petit Prince)
- Mirette Investigates (Les Enquêtes de Mirette)
- Secrets of History (Secrets d'Histoire)
- Tomorrow Is Ours (Demain Nous Appartient)
- Where It All Begins (Ici Tout Commence)
- The Whizz Report (C'est pas sorcier)
- Zorro: The Chronicles (Les Chroniques de Zorro)
- 64 Zoo Lane (64, rue du Zoo)
