= Epicles =

Set of ancient Greek figures

Epicles (Epiklês) (Ancient Greek: Ἐπικλῆς) was the name of several prominent Ancient Greeks:

- Epicles, an Ancient Greek medical writer who lived after Bacchius, and therefore probably in the 2nd or 1st century BC. Epicles is quoted by Erotianus, who wrote a commentary on the obsolete words found in the writings of Hippocrates, which he arranged in alphabetical order.
- Epicles of Troy, a Lycian or Trojan prince killed by Ajax.
- Epicles of Hermione, a musician who played the lyre, mentioned by Plutarch.
- Epicles, the eponymous archon of Athens of 131–130 BC
- Epicles, the father of Proteas, an Athenian admiral in the Peloponnesian War, mentioned by Thucydides.
- Epicles of Thespiae, mentioned on a dedication at Delphi.
- Epicles, a Spartan admiral during the Peloponnesian War.
