= 23718 Horgos =

Stony background asteroid

Discovery
- Discovered by: K. Sárneczky; L. Kiss
- Discovery site: Piszkéstető Stn.
- Discovery date: 2 April 1998

Designations
- Named after: Horgoš (Serbian village)
- Alternative designations: 1998 GO_{10} · 1999 TY_{32}
- Minor planet category: main-belt · (middle) background

Orbital characteristics
- Epoch 4 September 2017 (JD 2458000.5)
- Uncertainty parameter 0
- Observation arc: 21.31 yr (7,783 days)
- Aphelion: 3.0553 AU
- Perihelion: 2.0758 AU
- Semi-major axis: 2.5655 AU
- Eccentricity: 0.1909
- Orbital period (sidereal): 4.11 yr (1,501 days)
- Mean anomaly: 196.30°
- Mean motion: 0° 14^{m} 23.28^{s} / day
- Inclination: 1.4380°
- Longitude of ascending node: 324.67°
- Argument of perihelion: 318.70°

Physical characteristics
- Mean diameter: 2.79 km (calculated); 2.944±0.821 km
- Synodic rotation period: 3.57±0.030 h
- Geometric albedo: 0.20 (assumed); 0.269±0.166
- Spectral type: S
- Absolute magnitude (H): 14.690±0.110 (R) · 14.7 · 14.8 · 15.10±0.59 · 15.14

23718 Horgos (provisional designation 1998 GO_{10}) is a stony background asteroid from the central regions of the asteroid belt, approximately 2.9 kilometers in diameter. It was discovered on 2 April 1998, by Hungarian astronomers Krisztián Sárneczky and László Kiss at Konkoly's Piszkéstető Station northeast of Budapest, Hungary. The asteroid was named after the Serbian town of Horgoš.

== Orbit and classification ==
Horgos is a non-family from the main belt's background population. It orbits the Sun in the central main belt at a distance of 2.1–3.1 AU once every 4 years and 1 month (1,501 days). Its orbit has an eccentricity of 0.19 and an inclination of 1° with respect to the ecliptic.

The body's observation arc begins with a precovery taken by Spacewatch at Kitt Peak Observatory in November 1995, or 29 months prior to its official discovery observation at Piszkéstető.

== Physical characteristics ==
Horgos has been characterized as a stony S-type asteroid by PanSTARRS photometric survey.

=== Rotation period ===
In January 2014, a rotational lightcurve of Horgos was obtained from photometric observations in the R-band by astronomers at the Palomar Transient Factory in California. Lightcurve analysis gave a rotation period of 3.57 hours with a brightness amplitude of 0.21 magnitude (U=2).

=== Diameter and albedo ===
According to the survey carried out by the NEOWISE mission of NASA's Wide-field Infrared Survey Explorer, Horgos measures 2.944 kilometers in diameter and its surface has an albedo of 0.269. The Collaborative Asteroid Lightcurve Link assumes a standard albedo for stony asteroids of 0.20 and calculates a diameter of 2.79 kilometers based on an absolute magnitude of 15.14.

== Naming ==
This minor planet was named after the village of Horgoš, now in northern Serbia. The village is located near the Hungarian border and has a large Hungarian population. It is also the place where the second discoverer László L. Kiss grew up. The official naming citation was published by the Minor Planet Center on 5 July 2001 (M.P.C. 43048).
