= Epicles (admiral) =

Spartan admiral during the Peloponnesian War

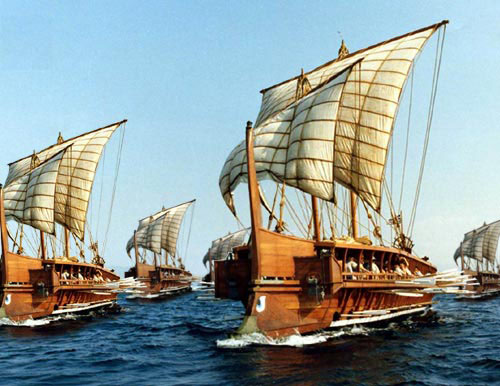
Fleet of triremes made up of photographs of the modern full-sized replica Olympias.

Epicles (Ancient Greek: Ἐπικλῆς) was an admiral from Sparta during the Peloponnesian War.

In 411 BC, the Spartans lost a fleet of 50 ships under the command of Epicleas. At the height of the Peloponnesian War, the Spartan fleet was caught in a violent storm while sailing past Mount Athos. Of the fifty ships only 12 men survived.
