= Jōzankei Dam =

Dam in Hokkaidō Prefecture, Japan

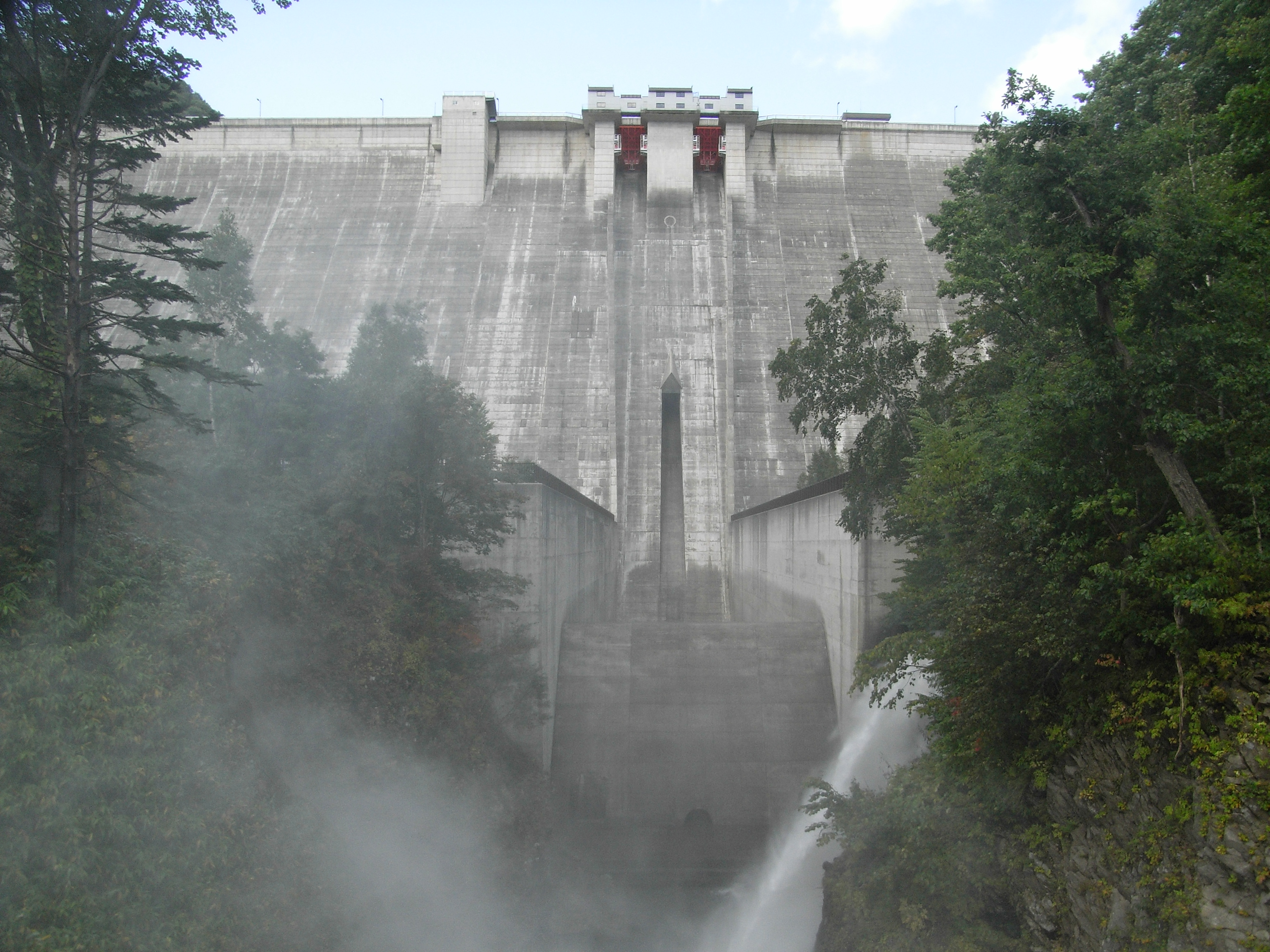
- Interactive map of Jōzankei Dam
- Location: Sapporo, Hokkaidō, Japan
- Coordinates: 42°59′05″N 141°09′27″E
- Construction began: 1974
- Opening date: 1989

Dam and spillways
- Impounds: Otarunai River
- Height: 118 m
- Length: 410 m

Reservoir
- Total capacity: 82,300,000 m^{3}
- Catchment area: 104 km^{2}
- Surface area: 230 hectares

Jōzankei Dam (定山渓ダム, Jōzan-kei Damu) is a concrete Gravity dam in Sapporo, Hokkaidō, Japan situated upon the Otaru River. It supports a 120 MW hydroelectric power station.
