= Frédéric Courant =

French journalist (born 1960)

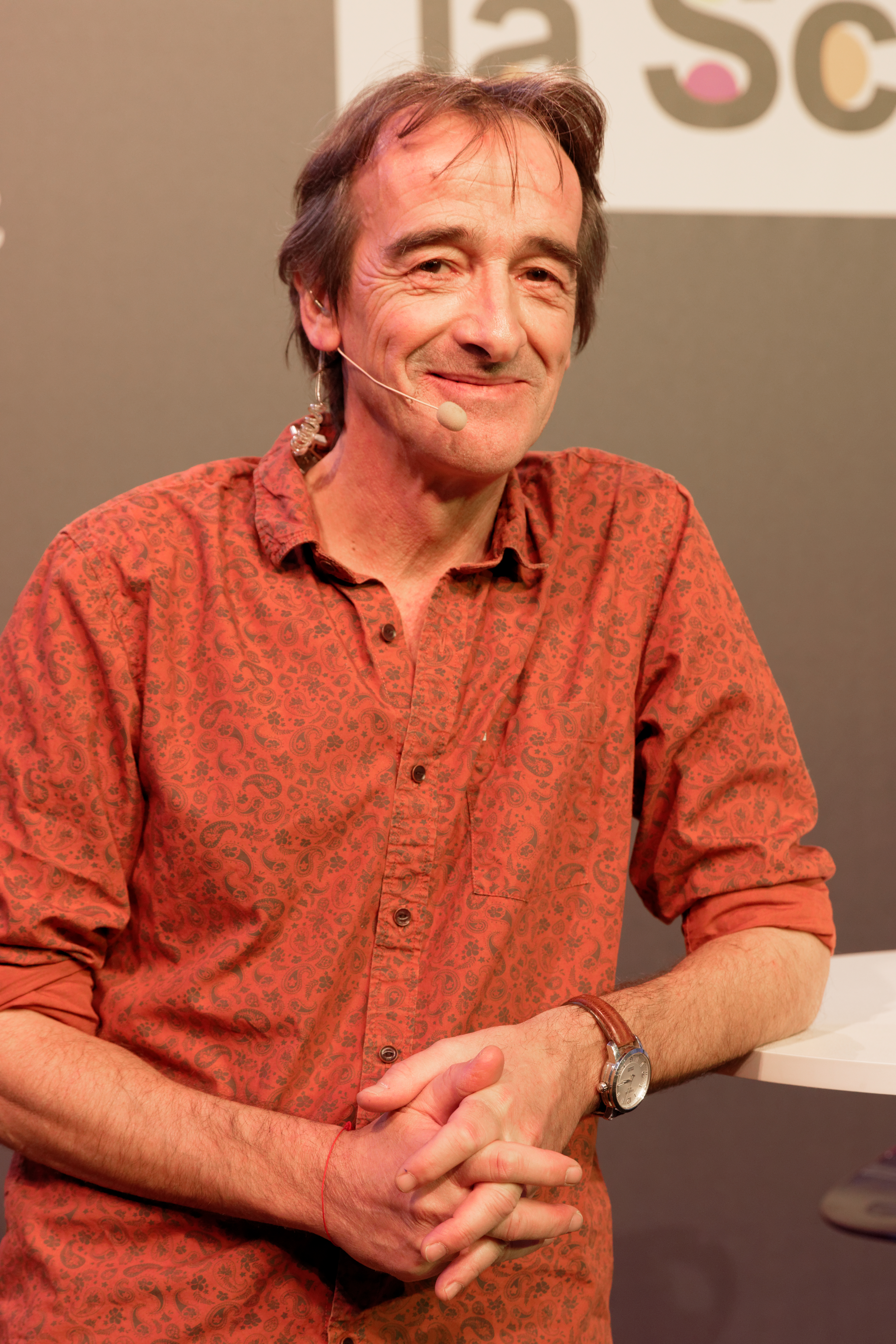
- Frédéric Courant in la fête de la science 2016 à la Cité des Sciences et de l'Industrie avec L'Esprit sorcier.
- Born: 14 April 1960 (age 66); Angers
- Occupation: Journalist
- Known for: C'est pas sorcier

Frédéric Courant (born 14 April 1960 in Angers) is a French journalist, well known from the educational TV show C'est pas sorcier that he presented with Jamy Gourmaud and Sabine Quindou and was produced from the channel France 3.

He attended the high school Lycée Chevrollier in Angers. He holds a postgraduate degree in international law. He was a journalist in the newspapers l'Evénement du jeudi and Quotidien de Paris from 1985 to 1989. His experience in television began in 1989 when he became editor of Canal Santé. In 1992, he joined France 3, where he is editor and presenter of "Fractales". In September 1994 he presented the program C'est Pas Sorcier a science magazine in which he is an author, editor and co-presenter. Since November 2001 he is author and presenter of the historical adventure magazine Quelle aventure! on the channel France 3. He participates with Renato Rinaldi and Caroline to the protection of cetaceans in the Caribbean since 1992.

Asteroid 23882 Fredcourant is named after him.

On May 11, 2011, he received with Jamy Gourmaud the insignia of doctor honoris causa at the University of Mons (Belgium).

On December 9, 2011, he received the "Prix du chef d'état-major de la Marine" with Jamy Gourmaud.
