= Sabine Quindou =

French journalist (born 1970)

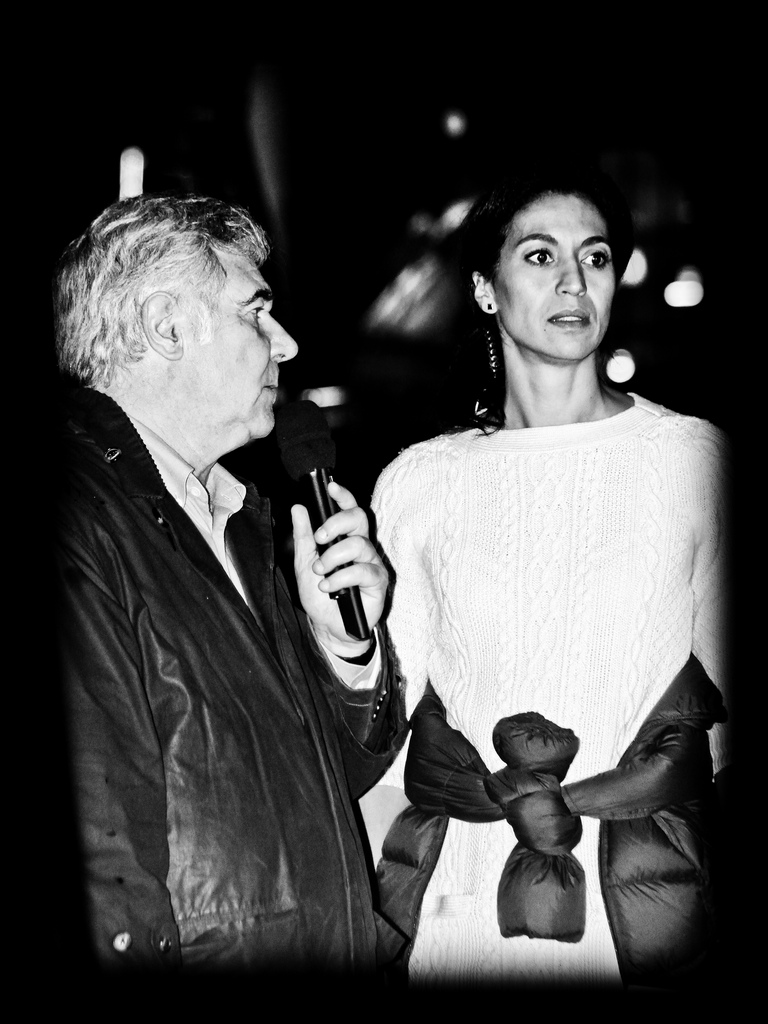
- Quindou (right) with Georges Pernoud in 2011
- Born: 23 November 1970 (age 55); France
- Education: CELSA Paris
- Occupations: TV presenter Journalist
- Employer: France Télévisions
- Notable credit(s): C'est pas sorcier Les Témoins d'Outre-mer

Sabine Quindou (Note: French pronunciation: [sabin kɛ̃du]) (born November 23, 1970) is a French journalist and presenter. She is best known for co-hosting the France 3 science TV show C'est pas sorcier (Note: English: It's Not Rocket Science) with Jamy Gourmaud and Frédéric Courant, presenting 188 episodes of the show from 1999 to 2013.

Quindou is also known for devising and staging shows popularising classical music. In 2020, she wrote, directed and performed in Les petits Secrets des instruments, (Note: English: The Little Secrets of Instruments) a weekly web series; each episode explores an item essential to a musician with the Orchestre National de Lyon, in partnership with Sabine Sorcières et Compagnie, her artistic company. From 2011 to 2022, she was also a presenter for Thalassa, a weekly docuseries about the world's seas and coastal places.

== Biography ==
Quindou gained her master's degree in contemporary history from CELSA Paris. She began her career as a reporter with France 2, Europe 1 and Agence France-Presse, before leaving to work in countries across Africa (Togo, Madagascar, Djibouti), reporting for RFO and TV5. In November 1998, she joined France 3 reporting for its magazine programme, C'est clair pour tout le monde (It's clear for all to see).

In 2007, she presented France 5's Attention fragile, a program about the environment. In 2008, she toured the world recording Thalassa, a magazine programme about the seas of the world. At the same time, she directed documentaries for France Télévisions.

She co-presented Thalassa with Georges Pernoud and Laurent Bignolas during the 2011–2012 season.

In January 2017, she performed "Souffler n'est pas jouer" in Lyon, an interactive and educational music show, exploring musical instruments of the wind family. The show was performed with the brass and percussion section of Orchestre national de Lyon. In March 2018, she reunited with her old colleague Frédéric Courant to present the show “I love digital” at the Country-Hall in Liège (Belgium).

In an interview looking back on her work with Georges Pernoud, she has mentioned that she sees her educational shows as part of her life's work:

La musique classique n’est pas réservée à une élite bourgeoise. Il arrive qu’un petit métis n’arrive pas à comprendre cela, parce qu’il se sent enfermé dans une catégorie. Je suis contre ça, mais je n’y arriverai pas seule. Je suis d’origine Martiniquaise, et je suis inspirée par le conte martiniquais du colibri qui ‘‘fait sa part’’ en essayant d’éteindre un incendie en puisant de l’eau avec un dé à coudre. Ce que je fais, c’est une goutte d’eau, mais c’est ma part.

Translation:

Classical music is not reserved for a bourgeois elite. Sometimes a small child of mixed race can't understand that, because he feels trapped in a particular category. I'm fighting against this, but I can't do it alone. I'm of Martinican origin, and I'm inspired by a tale from Martinique, of the hummingbird who "does his bit" by trying to put out a fire by drawing water with a thimble. What I'm doing is a drop in the ocean, but I'm doing my bit.

The asteroid (23890) Quindou, discovered 22 September 1998 by the OCA-DLR Asteroid Survey at Caussols, is named in her honour. It is about 2.9 kilometres (1.8 mi) in diameter, and orbits the sun beyond Mars.

== Career ==
=== Shows ===
- 2017 : Souffler n'est pas jouer
- 2018 : La Musique classique, c'est quoi ?
- 2019 : Le Petit Guide illustré de la grande musique
- 2019 : Au cœur de l'orgue
- 2021 : Sabine et Simon racontent...

=== Television ===
- 1998 : C'est clair pour tout le monde (France 3)
- 1999 : C'est pas la mer à boire (France 3)
- 1999–2012 : C'est pas sorcier (France 3)
- 2007 : Attention, fragile (France 5)
- 2011–2012 and since 2020 : Thalassa (France 3)
- 2012–2015 : Transportez-moi (La Chaîne parlementaire)
- 2016–2018 : Les Témoins d'Outre-mer (France Ô)
- 2018–2019 : Inspire (France 3 Auvergne-Rhône-Alpes)

=== Writing and directing documentaries ===
- 2002 : Outre-mer, terre de feu (à l'occasion du 100è anniversaire de l’éruption du Mont-Pelé à la Martinique).co-directed with Luc Beaudonnière (RFO)
- 2004 : Chambord : l’énigme de François Ier (France 5)
- 2006 : Patrimoine sans frontières, du cœur historique d’Oran au Sud-marocain (France 3)
- 2007 : Docteur Beligt, médecin des steppes (France 5)
- 2008 : Les grands Découvreurs, en Patagonie dans le sillage de Magellan (France 3)
- 2008 : Les grands Découvreurs, en Mélanésie dans le sillage de Bougainville (France 3)
- 2011 : Festin sous la mer, carnet de plongées en Australie (France 3, Planète+Thalassa)
- 2014 : Plongées en Pays Kanak co-written with Stéphane Jacques (Planète+Thalassa)
- 2014 : Cap sur des Paradis inexplorés co-written with Stéphane Jacques (Planète+Thalassa)
- 2015 : Une Semaine en Ballon, pour Faut Pas Rêver en Irlande (France 3)
- 2018 : Allez savoir : En Guadeloupe, comment souffle la vieille dame ? co-written with Eric Beauducel (France Ô)
- 2018 : Allez savoir : En Martinique, les tortues se cachent pour grandir co-written with Eric Beauducel (France Ô)
- 2018 : Songes et merveilles - La fête des lumières à Lyon (France 3)
- 2019 : Lumières sur Lyon (France 3)
- 2020 : Nice, le carnaval (France 3)

== Distinctions ==
- Mediterranéa Festival: Best TV film for Festin sous la mer, carnet de plongées en Australie
- Toiles de Mer Festival: Audience award for Festin sous la mer, carnet de plongées en Australie
- European Festival of Underwater Image and the Environment: Master Pro-Silver for Festin sous la mer, carnet de plongées en Australie
- Association of Social Information Journalists: First prize for "Hôpital : une école de santé ?"
- Roberval Prize 2005: Winner in the audiovisual work category.
