= Horgoš =

Horgoš Хоргош (Serbian) Horgos (Hungarian)
- Village (Selo)
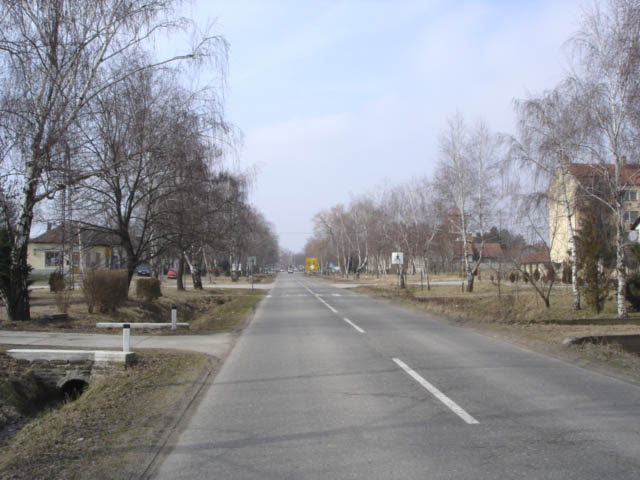
- Main street in Horgoš

- Location of Vojvoda Zimonić within Serbia Horgoš (Serbia) Horgoš (Europe)
- Coordinates: 46°09′12″N 19°58′13″E
- Country: Serbia
- Province: Vojvodina
- District: North Banat
- Municipalities: Kanjiža

Area
  - Total: 84.73 km^{2} (32.71 sq mi)
- Elevation: 75 m (246 ft)

Population (2011)
  - Total: 5,709
  - Density: 67.38/km^{2} (174.5/sq mi)
- Time zone: UTC+1 (CET)
  - Summer (DST): UTC+2 (CEST)
- Postal code: 24410, 24411
- Area code: +381(0)24
- Car plates: KA

Horgoš (Serbian: Хоргош, romanized: Horgoš; Hungarian: Horgos) is a village located in the municipality of Kanjiža, North Banat District, Vojvodina, Serbia. As of 2011 census, it has a population of 5,709 inhabitants. A border crossing between Serbia and Hungary is located in the village.

== History ==
The village is mentioned in documents already in the 11th century, as part of the Kingdom of Hungary. In the 13th century, the area was populated by Cumans, who were guaranteed a certain degree of autonomy by Béla VI of Hungary. In 1542 the region was conquered by the forces of Suleiman the Magnificent, Sultan of the Ottoman Empire.

After the Polish-Ottoman War (1683–1699), it was conquered by the Habsburg Empire and later became a part of Austro-Hungary. Between the two World Wars it was a part of Yugoslavia. In April 1941 German troops invaded Yugoslavia, and short later Germany handed the area to Hungary. In 1945 it was again a part of Yugoslavia. After the dismantling of Yugoslavia it was incorporated into the territory of Serbia.

== Jewish community ==
First documents on Jewish residents of Horgos date back to the 19th century. 87 Jews were counted in Horgos in 1877 and only 53 by the break of the Second World War. After the Hungarian occupation of the village in 1941, Jews were brutally persecuted, and after the German invasion in 1944 were deported to Nazi concentration camps. Only a few survived and returned to the village, but within several years emigrated to Israel.

== Famous residents ==
The village was the seat of the famous Hungarian noble family, the Kárász de Horgos et Szentpéter. The Serbian author Aleksandar Tišma was also born in Horgos to a Serbian father and Hungarian-Jewish mother. Among other noteworthy personalities who were born in Horgos are the astronomer László L. Kiss, the musician Albert Földi, the artists István Fujkin and Miklós Berényi, the actor Lehel Kovács and the computer scientist Josef H. Braun.

== Gallery ==
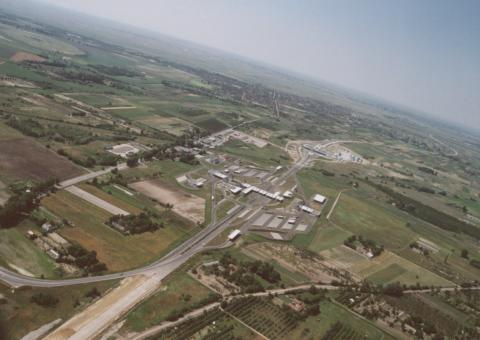
Aerial view of border crossing at Horgoš

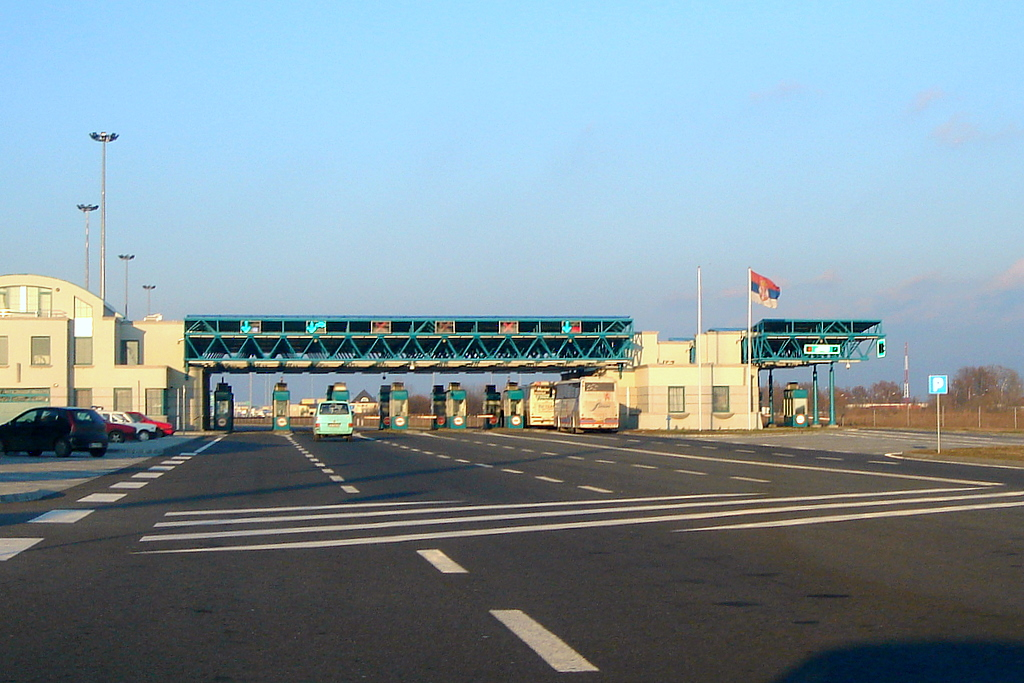
Border crossing at Horgoš

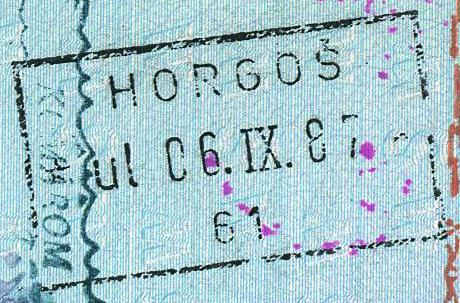
A 1987 passport stamp from Horgoš

== See also ==
- List of places in Serbia
- List of cities, towns and villages in Vojvodina
- 23718 Horgos, minor planet
