= C'est pas sorcier =

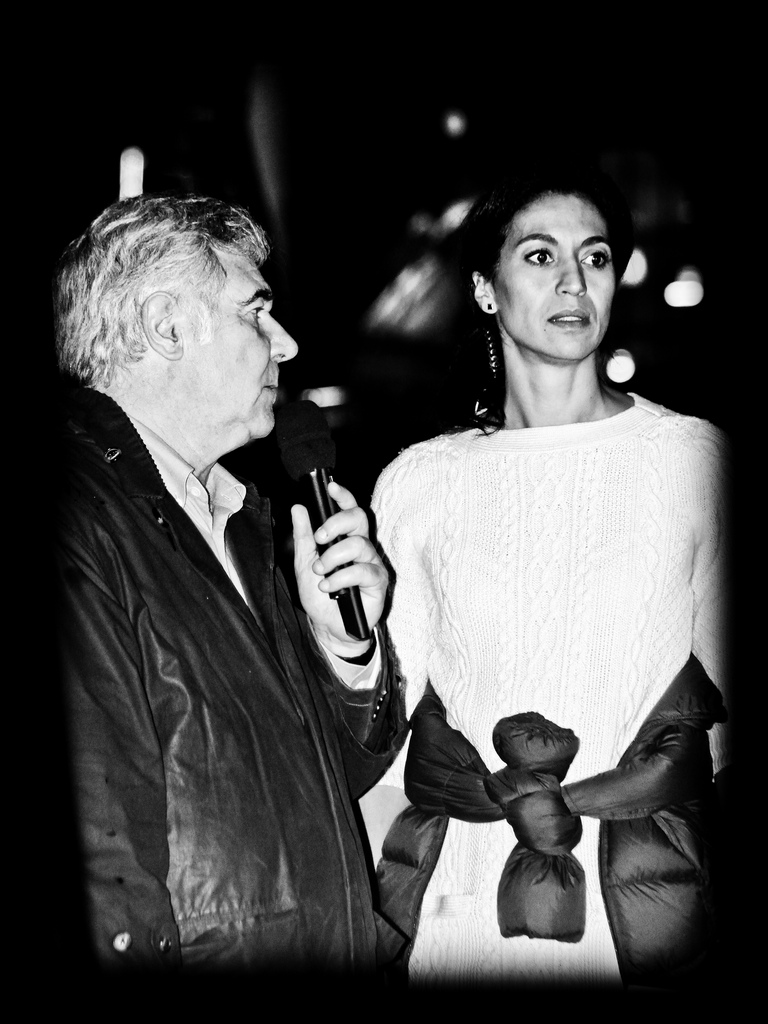
- Sabine Quindou, the tv presenter & journalist of the program
- Genre: Children's television series/Education
- Presented by: Jamy Gourmaud, Frédéric Courant, Sabine Quindou
- Narrated by: Valérie Guerlain
- Country of origin: France
- Original language: French
- No. of seasons: 20
- No. of episodes: 599

Production
- Executive producer: Elizabeth Cornali
- Producer: Philippe Molins (delegate)
- Production location: Variable
- Running time: 26 minutes
- Production company: Multimédia France Productions (France Télévisions)

Original release
- Network: France 3
- Release: September 19, 1993 – February 1, 2014

C'est pas sorcier (literally It's Not Sorcery, French for "it's not rocket science") is a popular French live-action, science education television program that originally aired from September 19, 1993, to February 1, 2014. In total, 559 episodes were produced. This program was popular culture, with an audience share of over 30% in France. The episodes continued to be rebroadcast, until at least 2021. Dubbed or subtitled, the program is or has been broadcast in many countries, in Europe (Italy, Finland, Greece via Ellinikí Radiofonía Tileórasi, Poland via Da Vinci Learning, and Portugal), in Asia (Cambodia, China, South Korea, Japan, Laos, Lebanon, Mongolia, Turkey, and Vietnam), in Africa (Morocco on the channel 2M, Tunisia via Tunisian television 2, Algeria via Canal Algérie and Berbère Télévision, and Mauritius by the national broadcaster), and in the United States on the streaming service France Channel (under the name The Whizz Report).

In 2015, a new show, l'Esprit Sorcier hosted by Frédéric Courant began airing online, presenting itself as a successor to C'est pas sorcier.

== The presenters ==
In the show, "Sabine" (Sabine Quindou) and "Fred" (Frédéric Courant) work together in the field. They travel around the world, interviewing specialists, and asking questions to "Jamy" (Jamy Gourmaud) who, in his laboratory in the trailer of a truck driven by "Marcel", would answer them using his iconic models and mock-ups. After 2011, he travels to symbolic locations relevant to the topic with a mobile laboratory equipped with touch screens, computer graphics and the models which originally garnered the show much success.

The show is narrated by La petite voix ("The Little Voice", played by Valérie Guerlain) who does not appear physically in the show, but offers off-screen commentary and narration.

== Topic ==
The programs can be classified into six categories:

- La Terre et l'Univers - (The earth and universe) (71 programmes) including: l'Espace et l'astronomie (space and astronomy) (18), la géologie (geology) (21), la géographie (geography), les découvertes (discovery) (32)
- La biodiversité, l'agronomie et l'environnement (biodiversity, agronomy and environment) (138) including la faune (fauna) (67), la botanique (botany) (14), l'alimentation et l'agronomie (food and agriculture) (25), l'écologie et le climat (ecology and climate) (32)
- Le sport et la santé (sport and health) (72) including le corps humain (human body) (26), la médecine (medicine) (27), le sport (sport) (19)
- Les technologies, la physique et la chimie (communication technology, physics and chemistry) (142) including physique et chimie (physics and chemistry) (13), énergie (energy) (16), les technologies et l'industrie (technology and industry) (23), les transports (transport) (44), la Défense (defence) (10), les grands travaux et l'architecture (big works and architecture) (14), la communication (communications) (23)
- L'histoire, la culture et la société (history, culture and society) (89) including l'histoire et l'archéologie (history and archeology) (44), Arts et spectacles (arts and shows) (18), économie et société (economy and society) (27)
- Les émissions spéciales (14) (special editions)
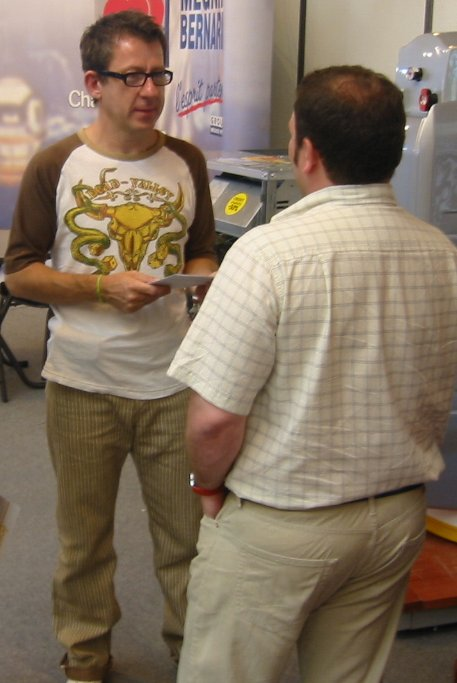
Jamy Gourmaud in 2006.

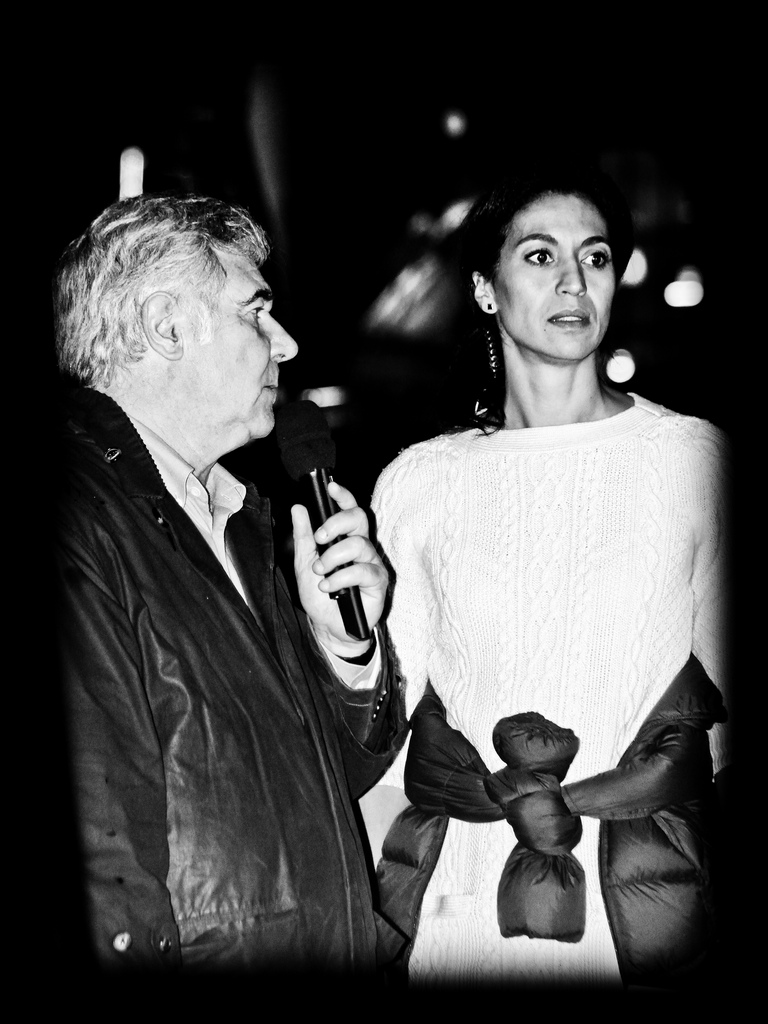
Sabine Quindou in 2011.

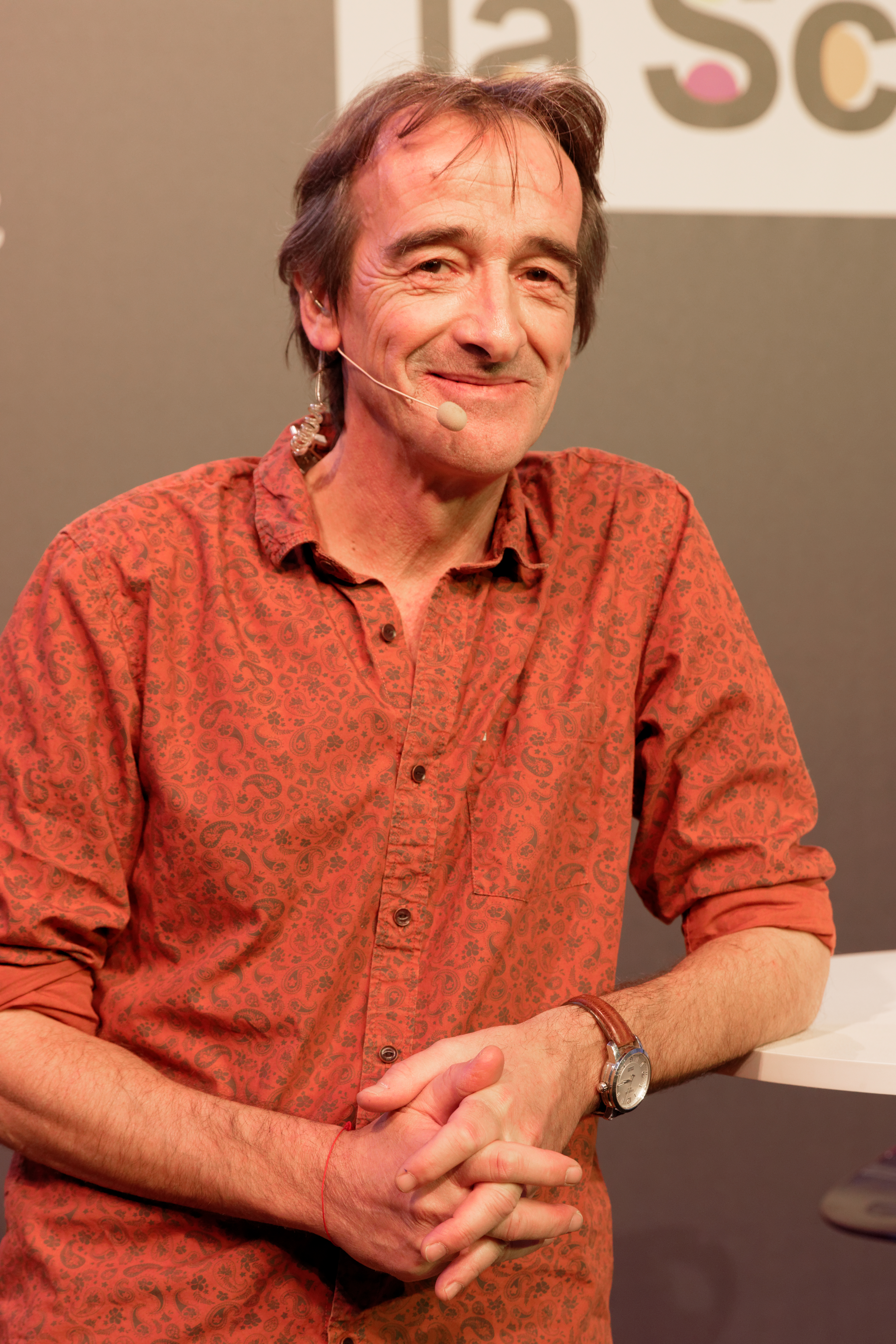
Frédéric Courant in 2016.
