= Jamy Gourmaud =

French journalist (born 1964)

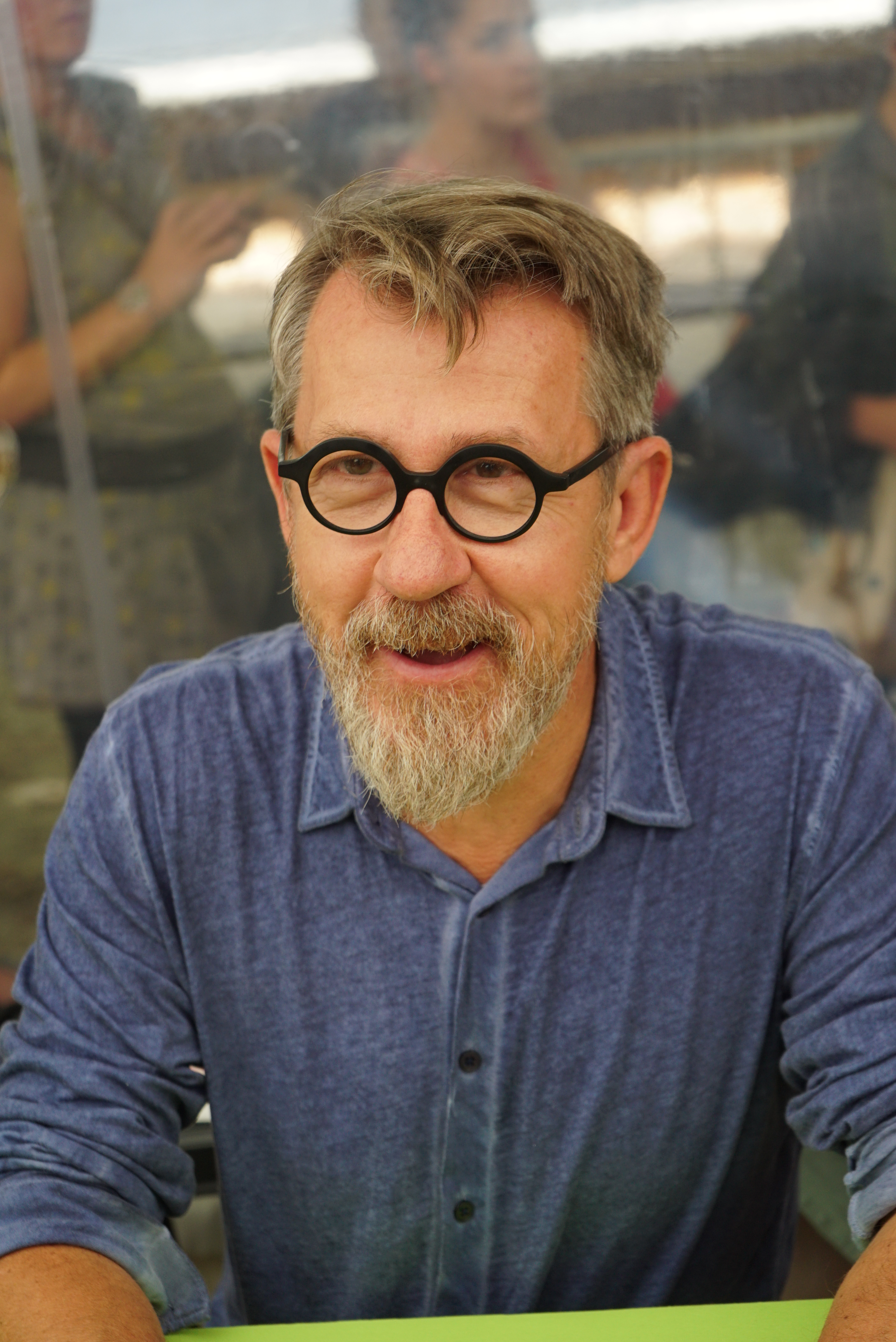
Gourmaud in 2019

Jamy Gourmaud (French pronunciation: [ʒami ɡuʁmo], born 17 January 1964) is a journalist well known from the educational TV show C'est pas sorcier that he presented with Frédéric Courant and Sabine Quindou and was produced by the channel France 3 from 1993 until 2014.

He was born in Fontenay-le-Comte and graduated from the Institut Pratique de Journalisme in 1988. A year later, he travelled the countries of Eastern Europe with his camera to shoot documentaries and news reports including one on maternity wards in Romania which, upon his return to France in 1989, earned him the prize of the Young Reporter Festival d'Angers. After working in print media and radio, he joined the team of "Fractales" on the channel France 3 in 1992. From September 1993 until 2014 he was author and presenter of the science magazine C'est Pas Sorcier. In 1998, he designed and presented the 26' d'arrêt.

Since September 2000 he has been a columnist on the scientific program "Pourquoi ? Comment ?" on France 3 and analyzes the news on the show Focus. In 2008 Jamy worked with specialists on topics such as memory or sleep and co-presented Le Lauréat de l’Histoire with Stéphane Bern on the channel France 3 and primetime Incroyables Expériences with Tania Young on France 2.

Asteroid 23877 Gourmaud was named after him.
