= List of minor planets: 23001–24000 =

The following is a partial list of minor planets, running from minor-planet number 23001 through 24000, inclusive. The primary data for this and other partial lists is based on JPL's "Small-Body Orbital Elements" and data available from the Minor Planet Center. Critical list information is also provided by the MPC, unless otherwise specified from Lowell Observatory. A detailed description of the table's columns and additional sources are given on the main page including a complete list of every page in this series, and a statistical break-up on the dynamical classification of minor planets.

Also see the summary list of all named bodies in numerical and alphabetical order, and the corresponding naming citations for the number range of this particular list. New namings may only be added to this list after official publication, as the preannouncement of names is condemned by the Working Group for Small Bodies Nomenclature of the International Astronomical Union.

Near-Earth obj.	MBA (inner)	MBA (outer)	Centaur
Mars-crosser	MBA (middle)	Jupiter trojan	Trans-Neptunian obj.
Unclassified

== 23001–23100 ==
Designation			Discovery			Properties		Ref
Permanent	Provisional	Named after	Date	Site	Discoverer(s)	Category	Diam.	Ref
23001	1999 VS_{89}	—	November 5, 1999	Socorro	LINEAR	HYG	10 km	MPC · JPL
23002 Jillhirsch	1999 VX_{92}	Jillhirsch	November 9, 1999	Socorro	LINEAR	·	2.3 km	MPC · JPL
23003 Ziminski	1999 VP_{106}	Ziminski	November 9, 1999	Socorro	LINEAR	NYS	3.3 km	MPC · JPL
23004 Triciatalbert	1999 VH_{114}	Triciatalbert	November 9, 1999	Catalina	CSS	WAT	6.6 km	MPC · JPL
23005	1999 VJ_{114}	—	November 9, 1999	Catalina	CSS	EUN	6.5 km	MPC · JPL
23006 Pazden	1999 VX_{137}	Pazden	November 13, 1999	Socorro	LINEAR	·	3.3 km	MPC · JPL
23007	1999 VC_{145}	—	November 13, 1999	Catalina	CSS	·	2.4 km	MPC · JPL
23008 Rebeccajohns	1999 VA_{149}	Rebeccajohns	November 14, 1999	Socorro	LINEAR	·	3.3 km	MPC · JPL
23009	1999 VL_{149}	—	November 14, 1999	Socorro	LINEAR	EOS	6.6 km	MPC · JPL
23010 Kathyfinch	1999 VR_{158}	Kathyfinch	November 14, 1999	Socorro	LINEAR	·	2.1 km	MPC · JPL
23011 Petach	1999 VG_{163}	Petach	November 14, 1999	Socorro	LINEAR	ERI	6.2 km	MPC · JPL
23012	1999 VM_{166}	—	November 14, 1999	Socorro	LINEAR	HYG ·	5.3 km	MPC · JPL
23013 Carolsmyth	1999 VP_{168}	Carolsmyth	November 14, 1999	Socorro	LINEAR	·	4.3 km	MPC · JPL
23014 Walstein	1999 VV_{173}	Walstein	November 15, 1999	Socorro	LINEAR	(5)	3.2 km	MPC · JPL
23015	1999 VQ_{179}	—	November 6, 1999	Socorro	LINEAR	·	6.0 km	MPC · JPL
23016 Michaelroche	1999 VZ_{184}	Michaelroche	November 15, 1999	Socorro	LINEAR	·	3.5 km	MPC · JPL
23017 Advincula	1999 VQ_{190}	Advincula	November 15, 1999	Socorro	LINEAR	·	4.1 km	MPC · JPL
23018 Annmoriarty	1999 VY_{190}	Annmoriarty	November 15, 1999	Socorro	LINEAR	NYS	4.3 km	MPC · JPL
23019 Thomgregory	1999 VQ_{201}	Thomgregory	November 3, 1999	Socorro	LINEAR	WIT	2.2 km	MPC · JPL
23020	1999 WY_{2}	—	November 27, 1999	Višnjan Observatory	K. Korlević	·	3.4 km	MPC · JPL
23021	1999 WR_{3}	—	November 28, 1999	Oizumi	T. Kobayashi	·	5.2 km	MPC · JPL
23022	1999 WJ_{4}	—	November 28, 1999	Oizumi	T. Kobayashi	KOR	4.4 km	MPC · JPL
23023	1999 WA_{7}	—	November 28, 1999	Višnjan Observatory	K. Korlević	KOR	5.6 km	MPC · JPL
23024	1999 WM_{7}	—	November 28, 1999	Višnjan Observatory	K. Korlević	·	4.1 km	MPC · JPL
23025	1999 WR_{9}	—	November 30, 1999	Oizumi	T. Kobayashi	CYB	20 km	MPC · JPL
23026	1999 WV_{9}	—	November 30, 1999	Oizumi	T. Kobayashi	EOS	12 km	MPC · JPL
23027	1999 WV_{17}	—	November 30, 1999	Kitt Peak	Spacewatch	·	5.2 km	MPC · JPL
23028	1999 XV_{3}	—	December 4, 1999	Catalina	CSS	CYB	11 km	MPC · JPL
23029	1999 XF_{4}	—	December 4, 1999	Catalina	CSS	·	6.7 km	MPC · JPL
23030 Jimkennedy	1999 XR_{7}	Jimkennedy	December 4, 1999	Fountain Hills	C. W. Juels	·	20 km	MPC · JPL
23031	1999 XX_{7}	—	December 3, 1999	Socorro	LINEAR	·	2.6 km	MPC · JPL
23032 Fossey	1999 XB_{8}	Fossey	December 3, 1999	Reedy Creek	J. Broughton	·	3.3 km	MPC · JPL
23033	1999 XU_{10}	—	December 5, 1999	Catalina	CSS	·	10 km	MPC · JPL
23034	1999 XJ_{15}	—	December 5, 1999	Višnjan Observatory	K. Korlević	NYS	3.2 km	MPC · JPL
23035	1999 XS_{17}	—	December 2, 1999	Socorro	LINEAR	·	3.9 km	MPC · JPL
23036	1999 XF_{18}	—	December 3, 1999	Socorro	LINEAR	·	3.5 km	MPC · JPL
23037	1999 XM_{18}	—	December 3, 1999	Socorro	LINEAR	NYS · slow	4.6 km	MPC · JPL
23038 Jeffbaughman	1999 XD_{19}	Jeffbaughman	December 3, 1999	Socorro	LINEAR	·	4.0 km	MPC · JPL
23039	1999 XP_{20}	—	December 5, 1999	Socorro	LINEAR	AGN	5.3 km	MPC · JPL
23040 Latham	1999 XK_{22}	Latham	December 6, 1999	Socorro	LINEAR	·	6.4 km	MPC · JPL
23041 Hunt	1999 XL_{22}	Hunt	December 6, 1999	Socorro	LINEAR	·	4.1 km	MPC · JPL
23042 Craigpeters	1999 XR_{22}	Craigpeters	December 6, 1999	Socorro	LINEAR	·	7.6 km	MPC · JPL
23043	1999 XN_{25}	—	December 6, 1999	Socorro	LINEAR	·	6.7 km	MPC · JPL
23044 Starodub	1999 XS_{25}	Starodub	December 6, 1999	Socorro	LINEAR	·	3.7 km	MPC · JPL
23045 Sarahocken	1999 XT_{27}	Sarahocken	December 6, 1999	Socorro	LINEAR	KOR	4.0 km	MPC · JPL
23046 Stevengordon	1999 XN_{28}	Stevengordon	December 6, 1999	Socorro	LINEAR	·	3.6 km	MPC · JPL
23047 Isseroff	1999 XS_{28}	Isseroff	December 6, 1999	Socorro	LINEAR	PAD	7.0 km	MPC · JPL
23048 Davidnelson	1999 XE_{29}	Davidnelson	December 6, 1999	Socorro	LINEAR	·	3.5 km	MPC · JPL
23049	1999 XT_{30}	—	December 6, 1999	Socorro	LINEAR	GEF	3.9 km	MPC · JPL
23050	1999 XJ_{36}	—	December 6, 1999	Višnjan Observatory	K. Korlević	KOR	3.5 km	MPC · JPL
23051	1999 XF_{37}	—	December 7, 1999	Fountain Hills	C. W. Juels	MAR	6.3 km	MPC · JPL
23052	1999 XK_{37}	—	December 7, 1999	Fountain Hills	C. W. Juels	·	8.6 km	MPC · JPL
23053	1999 XD_{42}	—	December 7, 1999	Socorro	LINEAR	·	9.2 km	MPC · JPL
23054 Thomaslynch	1999 XE_{42}	Thomaslynch	December 7, 1999	Socorro	LINEAR	KOR	3.3 km	MPC · JPL
23055 Barbjewett	1999 XF_{43}	Barbjewett	December 7, 1999	Socorro	LINEAR	·	5.7 km	MPC · JPL
23056	1999 XL_{44}	—	December 7, 1999	Socorro	LINEAR	KOR	4.3 km	MPC · JPL
23057 Angelawilson	1999 XB_{45}	Angelawilson	December 7, 1999	Socorro	LINEAR	RAF	3.1 km	MPC · JPL
23058	1999 XP_{45}	—	December 7, 1999	Socorro	LINEAR	·	12 km	MPC · JPL
23059 Paulpaino	1999 XT_{45}	Paulpaino	December 7, 1999	Socorro	LINEAR	NYS	12 km	MPC · JPL
23060 Shepherd	1999 XV_{46}	Shepherd	December 7, 1999	Socorro	LINEAR	·	3.7 km	MPC · JPL
23061 Blueglass	1999 XW_{46}	Blueglass	December 7, 1999	Socorro	LINEAR	THM · slow	7.6 km	MPC · JPL
23062 Donnamooney	1999 XN_{52}	Donnamooney	December 7, 1999	Socorro	LINEAR	MAS	2.3 km	MPC · JPL
23063 Lichtman	1999 XH_{53}	Lichtman	December 7, 1999	Socorro	LINEAR	·	3.5 km	MPC · JPL
23064 Mattmiller	1999 XE_{54}	Mattmiller	December 7, 1999	Socorro	LINEAR	·	5.5 km	MPC · JPL
23065	1999 XF_{54}	—	December 7, 1999	Socorro	LINEAR	THM	8.4 km	MPC · JPL
23066 Yihedong	1999 XN_{54}	Yihedong	December 7, 1999	Socorro	LINEAR	KOR	3.1 km	MPC · JPL
23067 Ishajain	1999 XX_{54}	Ishajain	December 7, 1999	Socorro	LINEAR	THM	7.2 km	MPC · JPL
23068 Tyagi	1999 XY_{60}	Tyagi	December 7, 1999	Socorro	LINEAR	·	3.6 km	MPC · JPL
23069 Kapps	1999 XR_{64}	Kapps	December 7, 1999	Socorro	LINEAR	·	7.5 km	MPC · JPL
23070 Koussa	1999 XV_{64}	Koussa	December 7, 1999	Socorro	LINEAR	HYG	8.3 km	MPC · JPL
23071 Tinaliu	1999 XH_{65}	Tinaliu	December 7, 1999	Socorro	LINEAR	KOR	3.5 km	MPC · JPL
23072	1999 XS_{71}	—	December 7, 1999	Socorro	LINEAR	HYG	9.2 km	MPC · JPL
23073	1999 XT_{75}	—	December 7, 1999	Socorro	LINEAR	·	8.4 km	MPC · JPL
23074 Sarakirsch	1999 XJ_{78}	Sarakirsch	December 7, 1999	Socorro	LINEAR	·	4.0 km	MPC · JPL
23075	1999 XV_{83}	—	December 7, 1999	Socorro	LINEAR	L4	34 km	MPC · JPL
23076	1999 XP_{93}	—	December 7, 1999	Socorro	LINEAR	·	20 km	MPC · JPL
23077	1999 XZ_{93}	—	December 7, 1999	Socorro	LINEAR	MAR	4.6 km	MPC · JPL
23078	1999 XB_{95}	—	December 7, 1999	Catalina	CSS	·	18 km	MPC · JPL
23079 Munguia	1999 XO_{97}	Munguia	December 7, 1999	Socorro	LINEAR	NYS ·	6.3 km	MPC · JPL
23080	1999 XH_{100}	—	December 7, 1999	Socorro	LINEAR	·	6.6 km	MPC · JPL
23081	1999 XQ_{105}	—	December 11, 1999	Oaxaca	Roe, J. M.	EUN	3.2 km	MPC · JPL
23082	1999 XK_{107}	—	December 4, 1999	Catalina	CSS	·	3.4 km	MPC · JPL
23083	1999 XU_{110}	—	December 5, 1999	Catalina	CSS	·	4.9 km	MPC · JPL
23084	1999 XU_{113}	—	December 11, 1999	Socorro	LINEAR	MAR	3.8 km	MPC · JPL
23085	1999 XM_{116}	—	December 5, 1999	Catalina	CSS	PAD	6.4 km	MPC · JPL
23086	1999 XB_{118}	—	December 5, 1999	Catalina	CSS	·	4.7 km	MPC · JPL
23087	1999 XL_{118}	—	December 5, 1999	Catalina	CSS	·	5.8 km	MPC · JPL
23088	1999 XR_{118}	—	December 5, 1999	Catalina	CSS	·	4.5 km	MPC · JPL
23089	1999 XC_{119}	—	December 5, 1999	Catalina	CSS	·	4.4 km	MPC · JPL
23090	1999 XX_{121}	—	December 7, 1999	Catalina	CSS	EUN	7.4 km	MPC · JPL
23091 Stansill	1999 XP_{128}	Stansill	December 7, 1999	Socorro	LINEAR	·	5.7 km	MPC · JPL
23092	1999 XT_{136}	—	December 14, 1999	Fountain Hills	C. W. Juels	·	4.2 km	MPC · JPL
23093	1999 XW_{136}	—	December 14, 1999	Fountain Hills	C. W. Juels	·	4.8 km	MPC · JPL
23094	1999 XF_{143}	—	December 15, 1999	Fountain Hills	C. W. Juels	·	8.1 km	MPC · JPL
23095	1999 XP_{144}	—	December 15, 1999	Oohira	T. Urata	HYG	10 km	MPC · JPL
23096 Mihika	1999 XT_{156}	Mihika	December 8, 1999	Socorro	LINEAR	·	3.4 km	MPC · JPL
23097	1999 XF_{157}	—	December 8, 1999	Socorro	LINEAR	(5)	4.9 km	MPC · JPL
23098 Huanghuang	1999 XH_{158}	Huanghuang	December 8, 1999	Socorro	LINEAR	AGN	3.4 km	MPC · JPL
23099	1999 XA_{160}	—	December 8, 1999	Socorro	LINEAR	·	29 km	MPC · JPL
23100	1999 XN_{164}	—	December 8, 1999	Socorro	LINEAR	GEF	6.3 km	MPC · JPL

== 23101–23200 ==
back to top

Designation			Discovery			Properties		Ref
Permanent	Provisional	Named after	Date	Site	Discoverer(s)	Category	Diam.	Ref
23101	1999 XP_{164}	—	December 8, 1999	Socorro	LINEAR	·	18 km	MPC · JPL
23102 Dayanli	1999 XA_{168}	Dayanli	December 10, 1999	Socorro	LINEAR	PAD	8.1 km	MPC · JPL
23103	1999 XK_{169}	—	December 10, 1999	Socorro	LINEAR	·	13 km	MPC · JPL
23104	1999 XK_{182}	—	December 12, 1999	Socorro	LINEAR	ADE	12 km	MPC · JPL
23105	1999 XN_{184}	—	December 12, 1999	Socorro	LINEAR	·	8.8 km	MPC · JPL
23106	1999 XM_{191}	—	December 12, 1999	Socorro	LINEAR	slow	17 km	MPC · JPL
23107	1999 XA_{242}	—	December 13, 1999	Catalina	CSS	·	9.1 km	MPC · JPL
23108	1999 YP_{9}	—	December 31, 1999	Oizumi	T. Kobayashi	·	4.9 km	MPC · JPL
23109 Masayanagisawa	1999 YD_{13}	Masayanagisawa	December 30, 1999	Anderson Mesa	LONEOS	·	9.4 km	MPC · JPL
23110 Ericberne	2000 AE	Ericberne	January 2, 2000	Fountain Hills	C. W. Juels	·	4.0 km	MPC · JPL
23111 Fritzperls	2000 AG	Fritzperls	January 2, 2000	Fountain Hills	C. W. Juels	V	3.2 km	MPC · JPL
23112	2000 AG_{3}	—	January 2, 2000	Socorro	LINEAR	·	3.9 km	MPC · JPL
23113 Aaronhakim	2000 AE_{13}	Aaronhakim	January 3, 2000	Socorro	LINEAR	AGN	3.8 km	MPC · JPL
23114	2000 AL_{16}	—	January 3, 2000	Socorro	LINEAR	L4	20 km	MPC · JPL
23115 Valcourt	2000 AS_{18}	Valcourt	January 3, 2000	Socorro	LINEAR	HYG	6.9 km	MPC · JPL
23116 Streich	2000 AW_{22}	Streich	January 3, 2000	Socorro	LINEAR	RAF	3.9 km	MPC · JPL
23117	2000 AC_{25}	—	January 3, 2000	Socorro	LINEAR	THM	7.9 km	MPC · JPL
23118	2000 AU_{27}	—	January 3, 2000	Socorro	LINEAR	L4	20 km	MPC · JPL
23119	2000 AP_{33}	—	January 3, 2000	Socorro	LINEAR	L4	33 km	MPC · JPL
23120 Paulallen	2000 AP_{50}	Paulallen	January 5, 2000	Fountain Hills	C. W. Juels	EUN	11 km	MPC · JPL
23121 Michaelding	2000 AP_{51}	Michaelding	January 4, 2000	Socorro	LINEAR	·	3.4 km	MPC · JPL
23122 Lorgat	2000 AU_{52}	Lorgat	January 4, 2000	Socorro	LINEAR	·	3.3 km	MPC · JPL
23123	2000 AU_{57}	—	January 4, 2000	Socorro	LINEAR	L4 · slow	26 km	MPC · JPL
23124	2000 AW_{82}	—	January 5, 2000	Socorro	LINEAR	·	3.9 km	MPC · JPL
23125	2000 AK_{94}	—	January 4, 2000	Socorro	LINEAR	EOS	8.0 km	MPC · JPL
23126	2000 AK_{95}	—	January 4, 2000	Socorro	LINEAR	L4	23 km	MPC · JPL
23127	2000 AV_{97}	—	January 4, 2000	Socorro	LINEAR	·	4.0 km	MPC · JPL
23128 Dorminy	2000 AQ_{98}	Dorminy	January 5, 2000	Socorro	LINEAR	·	3.3 km	MPC · JPL
23129	2000 AO_{100}	—	January 5, 2000	Socorro	LINEAR	·	20 km	MPC · JPL
23130	2000 AZ_{106}	—	January 5, 2000	Socorro	LINEAR	·	5.0 km	MPC · JPL
23131 Debenedictis	2000 AS_{128}	Debenedictis	January 5, 2000	Socorro	LINEAR	·	3.9 km	MPC · JPL
23132	2000 AT_{131}	—	January 3, 2000	Socorro	LINEAR	HYG	8.4 km	MPC · JPL
23133 Rishinbehl	2000 AO_{139}	Rishinbehl	January 5, 2000	Socorro	LINEAR	V	2.4 km	MPC · JPL
23134	2000 AU_{142}	—	January 5, 2000	Socorro	LINEAR	EOS	11 km	MPC · JPL
23135 Pheidas	2000 AN_{146}	Pheidas	January 7, 2000	Socorro	LINEAR	L4	66 km	MPC · JPL
23136	2000 AD_{148}	—	January 5, 2000	Socorro	LINEAR	·	8.1 km	MPC · JPL
23137	2000 AV_{148}	—	January 7, 2000	Socorro	LINEAR	·	10 km	MPC · JPL
23138	2000 AV_{150}	—	January 8, 2000	Socorro	LINEAR	·	7.7 km	MPC · JPL
23139	2000 AP_{151}	—	January 8, 2000	Socorro	LINEAR	·	3.3 km	MPC · JPL
23140	2000 AW_{154}	—	January 3, 2000	Socorro	LINEAR	·	13 km	MPC · JPL
23141	2000 AB_{163}	—	January 5, 2000	Socorro	LINEAR	EOS	8.7 km	MPC · JPL
23142	2000 AM_{165}	—	January 8, 2000	Socorro	LINEAR	·	13 km	MPC · JPL
23143	2000 AZ_{177}	—	January 7, 2000	Socorro	LINEAR	·	12 km	MPC · JPL
23144	2000 AY_{182}	—	January 7, 2000	Socorro	LINEAR	L4	19 km	MPC · JPL
23145	2000 AB_{187}	—	January 8, 2000	Socorro	LINEAR	·	5.5 km	MPC · JPL
23146	2000 AM_{200}	—	January 9, 2000	Socorro	LINEAR	INA	9.7 km	MPC · JPL
23147	2000 AQ_{228}	—	January 5, 2000	Socorro	LINEAR	·	5.6 km	MPC · JPL
23148	2000 AR_{242}	—	January 7, 2000	Socorro	LINEAR	·	6.1 km	MPC · JPL
23149	2000 AF_{244}	—	January 8, 2000	Socorro	LINEAR	·	7.4 km	MPC · JPL
23150	2000 AG_{244}	—	January 8, 2000	Socorro	LINEAR	·	11 km	MPC · JPL
23151 Georgehotz	2000 BH_{27}	Georgehotz	January 30, 2000	Socorro	LINEAR	KOR	3.5 km	MPC · JPL
23152	2000 CS_{8}	—	February 2, 2000	Socorro	LINEAR	L4	19 km	MPC · JPL
23153 Andrewnowell	2000 CH_{46}	Andrewnowell	February 2, 2000	Socorro	LINEAR	·	4.5 km	MPC · JPL
23154	2000 CL_{58}	—	February 5, 2000	Socorro	LINEAR	EUN	5.1 km	MPC · JPL
23155 Judithblack	2000 CK_{86}	Judithblack	February 4, 2000	Socorro	LINEAR	·	3.7 km	MPC · JPL
23156	2000 DM_{3}	—	February 28, 2000	Višnjan Observatory	K. Korlević, M. Jurić	·	2.2 km	MPC · JPL
23157	2000 DH_{19}	—	February 29, 2000	Socorro	LINEAR	THM	10 km	MPC · JPL
23158 Bouligny	2000 DN_{99}	Bouligny	February 29, 2000	Socorro	LINEAR	·	5.7 km	MPC · JPL
23159	2000 EB_{58}	—	March 8, 2000	Socorro	LINEAR	·	9.3 km	MPC · JPL
23160	2000 EN_{201}	—	March 13, 2000	Socorro	LINEAR	HNS	8.3 km	MPC · JPL
23161	2000 FS_{3}	—	March 28, 2000	Socorro	LINEAR	EOS	7.0 km	MPC · JPL
23162 Alexcrook	2000 FX_{48}	Alexcrook	March 30, 2000	Socorro	LINEAR	NYS	4.3 km	MPC · JPL
23163	2000 FG_{49}	—	March 30, 2000	Socorro	LINEAR	NYS	3.7 km	MPC · JPL
23164 Badger	2000 GR_{73}	Badger	April 5, 2000	Socorro	LINEAR	·	4.9 km	MPC · JPL
23165 Kakinchan	2000 GO_{81}	Kakinchan	April 6, 2000	Socorro	LINEAR	·	4.0 km	MPC · JPL
23166 Bilal	2000 GE_{104}	Bilal	April 7, 2000	Socorro	LINEAR	·	9.2 km	MPC · JPL
23167	2000 GL_{124}	—	April 7, 2000	Socorro	LINEAR	·	11 km	MPC · JPL
23168 Lauriefletch	2000 GZ_{136}	Lauriefletch	April 12, 2000	Socorro	LINEAR	·	3.1 km	MPC · JPL
23169 Michikami	2000 GK_{174}	Michikami	April 5, 2000	Anderson Mesa	LONEOS	·	4.0 km	MPC · JPL
23170	2000 GZ_{178}	—	April 4, 2000	Socorro	LINEAR	EUN	3.6 km	MPC · JPL
23171	2000 HF_{10}	—	April 27, 2000	Socorro	LINEAR	AGN	5.1 km	MPC · JPL
23172 Williamartin	2000 HU_{22}	Williamartin	April 29, 2000	Socorro	LINEAR	·	2.1 km	MPC · JPL
23173 Hideaki	2000 HF_{26}	Hideaki	April 24, 2000	Anderson Mesa	LONEOS	·	4.2 km	MPC · JPL
23174	2000 HM_{40}	—	April 30, 2000	Kitt Peak	Spacewatch	T_{j} (2.94) · 3:2	24 km	MPC · JPL
23175	2000 HL_{87}	—	April 27, 2000	Socorro	LINEAR	·	3.3 km	MPC · JPL
23176 Missacarvell	2000 JK_{44}	Missacarvell	May 7, 2000	Socorro	LINEAR	·	3.3 km	MPC · JPL
23177	2000 JD_{58}	—	May 6, 2000	Socorro	LINEAR	V	4.6 km	MPC · JPL
23178 Ghaben	2000 KJ_{21}	Ghaben	May 28, 2000	Socorro	LINEAR	·	1.7 km	MPC · JPL
23179 Niedermeyer	2000 KF_{28}	Niedermeyer	May 28, 2000	Socorro	LINEAR	·	4.1 km	MPC · JPL
23180 Ryosuke	2000 KH_{57}	Ryosuke	May 28, 2000	Anderson Mesa	LONEOS	·	7.6 km	MPC · JPL
23181	2000 LP_{20}	—	June 8, 2000	Socorro	LINEAR	slow	2.4 km	MPC · JPL
23182 Siyaxuza	2000 OV_{12}	Siyaxuza	July 23, 2000	Socorro	LINEAR	·	2.5 km	MPC · JPL
23183	2000 OY_{21}	—	July 28, 2000	Siding Spring	R. H. McNaught	AMO +1km	1.1 km	MPC · JPL
23184	2000 OD_{36}	—	July 23, 2000	Socorro	LINEAR	PHO	9.0 km	MPC · JPL
23185	2000 PQ_{7}	—	August 2, 2000	Socorro	LINEAR	fast	6.7 km	MPC · JPL
23186 Knauss	2000 PO_{8}	Knauss	August 6, 2000	Needville	W. G. Dillon, C. Gustava	3:2	28 km	MPC · JPL
23187	2000 PN_{9}	—	August 8, 2000	Socorro	LINEAR	APO +1km · PHA	2.2 km	MPC · JPL
23188	2000 PJ_{20}	—	August 1, 2000	Socorro	LINEAR	·	7.9 km	MPC · JPL
23189	2000 PT_{23}	—	August 2, 2000	Socorro	LINEAR	THM	7.4 km	MPC · JPL
23190 Klages-Mundt	2000 QP_{29}	Klages-Mundt	August 24, 2000	Socorro	LINEAR	·	2.8 km	MPC · JPL
23191 Sujaytyle	2000 QD_{45}	Sujaytyle	August 24, 2000	Socorro	LINEAR	·	6.3 km	MPC · JPL
23192 Caysvesterby	2000 QN_{122}	Caysvesterby	August 25, 2000	Socorro	LINEAR	EOS	6.5 km	MPC · JPL
23193	2000 QK_{181}	—	August 31, 2000	Socorro	LINEAR	·	5.7 km	MPC · JPL
23194	2000 RF_{1}	—	September 1, 2000	Socorro	LINEAR	·	3.1 km	MPC · JPL
23195	2000 RA_{58}	—	September 7, 2000	Kitt Peak	Spacewatch	slow	10 km	MPC · JPL
23196	2000 RY_{59}	—	September 5, 2000	Višnjan Observatory	K. Korlević	·	12 km	MPC · JPL
23197 Danielcook	2000 RA_{62}	Danielcook	September 1, 2000	Socorro	LINEAR	NYS	4.0 km	MPC · JPL
23198 Norvell	2000 RL_{68}	Norvell	September 2, 2000	Socorro	LINEAR	KOR	4.7 km	MPC · JPL
23199 Bezdek	2000 RB_{92}	Bezdek	September 3, 2000	Socorro	LINEAR	·	4.1 km	MPC · JPL
23200	2000 SH_{3}	—	September 20, 2000	Socorro	LINEAR	PHO	6.7 km	MPC · JPL

== 23201–23300 ==
back to top

Designation			Discovery			Properties		Ref
Permanent	Provisional	Named after	Date	Site	Discoverer(s)	Category	Diam.	Ref
23201	2000 SJ_{42}	—	September 27, 2000	Zeno	T. Stafford	·	3.7 km	MPC · JPL
23202	2000 SU_{49}	—	September 23, 2000	Socorro	LINEAR	·	9.4 km	MPC · JPL
23203	2000 SU_{161}	—	September 20, 2000	Haleakala	NEAT	·	5.2 km	MPC · JPL
23204 Arditkroni	2000 SN_{172}	Arditkroni	September 27, 2000	Socorro	LINEAR	V	3.7 km	MPC · JPL
23205	2000 SL_{222}	—	September 26, 2000	Socorro	LINEAR	EUN	4.6 km	MPC · JPL
23206	2000 SL_{225}	—	September 27, 2000	Socorro	LINEAR	·	4.8 km	MPC · JPL
23207	2000 SL_{279}	—	September 30, 2000	Socorro	LINEAR	·	6.6 km	MPC · JPL
23208	2000 SO_{279}	—	September 25, 2000	Socorro	LINEAR	EOS	5.3 km	MPC · JPL
23209	2000 SX_{279}	—	September 25, 2000	Socorro	LINEAR	·	9.4 km	MPC · JPL
23210	2000 SA_{293}	—	September 27, 2000	Socorro	LINEAR	·	9.2 km	MPC · JPL
23211	2000 SC_{311}	—	September 26, 2000	Socorro	LINEAR	·	5.0 km	MPC · JPL
23212 Arkajitdey	2000 UR_{39}	Arkajitdey	October 24, 2000	Socorro	LINEAR	·	5.1 km	MPC · JPL
23213 Ameliachang	2000 US_{70}	Ameliachang	October 25, 2000	Socorro	LINEAR	·	4.8 km	MPC · JPL
23214 Patrickchen	2000 UQ_{73}	Patrickchen	October 26, 2000	Socorro	LINEAR	·	3.5 km	MPC · JPL
23215	2000 UV_{75}	—	October 31, 2000	Socorro	LINEAR	PHO	5.0 km	MPC · JPL
23216 Mikehagler	2000 UX_{79}	Mikehagler	October 24, 2000	Socorro	LINEAR	·	3.7 km	MPC · JPL
23217 Nayana	2000 UV_{104}	Nayana	October 25, 2000	Socorro	LINEAR	(2076)	3.6 km	MPC · JPL
23218 Puttachi	2000 VN_{23}	Puttachi	November 1, 2000	Socorro	LINEAR	KOR	4.2 km	MPC · JPL
23219	2000 VW_{23}	—	November 1, 2000	Socorro	LINEAR	·	5.4 km	MPC · JPL
23220 Yalemichaels	2000 VO_{28}	Yalemichaels	November 1, 2000	Socorro	LINEAR	·	3.1 km	MPC · JPL
23221 Delgado	2000 VX_{35}	Delgado	November 1, 2000	Socorro	LINEAR	·	3.4 km	MPC · JPL
23222	2000 VZ_{53}	—	November 3, 2000	Socorro	LINEAR	·	7.1 km	MPC · JPL
23223	2000 WA	—	November 16, 2000	Kitt Peak	Spacewatch	·	7.3 km	MPC · JPL
23224	2000 WD_{10}	—	November 22, 2000	Kitt Peak	Spacewatch	·	6.1 km	MPC · JPL
23225	2000 WD_{25}	—	November 20, 2000	Socorro	LINEAR	·	6.8 km	MPC · JPL
23226	2000 WC_{49}	—	November 21, 2000	Socorro	LINEAR	NYS	3.7 km	MPC · JPL
23227	2000 WP_{55}	—	November 20, 2000	Socorro	LINEAR	·	10 km	MPC · JPL
23228 Nandinisarma	2000 WQ_{57}	Nandinisarma	November 21, 2000	Socorro	LINEAR	V	2.3 km	MPC · JPL
23229	2000 WX_{58}	—	November 21, 2000	Socorro	LINEAR	·	4.9 km	MPC · JPL
23230	2000 WM_{59}	—	November 21, 2000	Socorro	LINEAR	·	6.2 km	MPC · JPL
23231	2000 WT_{59}	—	November 21, 2000	Socorro	LINEAR	V	5.6 km	MPC · JPL
23232 Buschur	2000 WU_{59}	Buschur	November 21, 2000	Socorro	LINEAR	·	9.1 km	MPC · JPL
23233	2000 WM_{72}	—	November 19, 2000	Socorro	LINEAR	PHO	4.5 km	MPC · JPL
23234 Lilliantsai	2000 WO_{88}	Lilliantsai	November 20, 2000	Socorro	LINEAR	V	2.2 km	MPC · JPL
23235 Yingfan	2000 WD_{98}	Yingfan	November 21, 2000	Socorro	LINEAR	·	3.2 km	MPC · JPL
23236	2000 WX_{100}	—	November 21, 2000	Socorro	LINEAR	·	8.8 km	MPC · JPL
23237	2000 WV_{104}	—	November 24, 2000	Kitt Peak	Spacewatch	·	3.8 km	MPC · JPL
23238 Ocasio-Cortez	2000 WU_{111}	Ocasio-Cortez	November 20, 2000	Socorro	LINEAR	V	2.3 km	MPC · JPL
23239	2000 WR_{116}	—	November 20, 2000	Socorro	LINEAR	(5)	3.9 km	MPC · JPL
23240	2000 WG_{118}	—	November 20, 2000	Socorro	LINEAR	·	3.2 km	MPC · JPL
23241 Yada	2000 WV_{131}	Yada	November 20, 2000	Anderson Mesa	LONEOS	·	3.7 km	MPC · JPL
23242	2000 WY_{140}	—	November 21, 2000	Socorro	LINEAR	·	7.9 km	MPC · JPL
23243	2000 WT_{145}	—	November 22, 2000	Haleakala	NEAT	·	7.7 km	MPC · JPL
23244 Lafayette	2000 WP_{162}	Lafayette	November 20, 2000	Anderson Mesa	LONEOS	·	3.4 km	MPC · JPL
23245 Fujimura	2000 WP_{168}	Fujimura	November 25, 2000	Anderson Mesa	LONEOS	·	2.1 km	MPC · JPL
23246 Terazono	2000 WY_{168}	Terazono	November 25, 2000	Anderson Mesa	LONEOS	RAF	3.4 km	MPC · JPL
23247	2000 WG_{174}	—	November 26, 2000	Socorro	LINEAR	·	7.2 km	MPC · JPL
23248 Batchelor	2000 WW_{178}	Batchelor	November 25, 2000	Socorro	LINEAR	·	6.3 km	MPC · JPL
23249 Liaoyenting	2000 WJ_{179}	Liaoyenting	November 26, 2000	Socorro	LINEAR	V	1.9 km	MPC · JPL
23250	2000 WQ_{181}	—	November 22, 2000	Haleakala	NEAT	·	2.1 km	MPC · JPL
23251	2000 XL_{6}	—	December 1, 2000	Socorro	LINEAR	·	8.7 km	MPC · JPL
23252	2000 XO_{7}	—	December 1, 2000	Socorro	LINEAR	PHO	2.5 km	MPC · JPL
23253	2000 YY_{12}	—	December 19, 2000	Haleakala	NEAT	·	4.2 km	MPC · JPL
23254 Chikatoshi	2000 YZ_{15}	Chikatoshi	December 22, 2000	Anderson Mesa	LONEOS	·	9.0 km	MPC · JPL
23255	2000 YD_{17}	—	December 22, 2000	Socorro	LINEAR	(23255) ·	9.7 km	MPC · JPL
23256	2000 YK_{17}	—	December 28, 2000	Fountain Hills	C. W. Juels	MAS	2.5 km	MPC · JPL
23257 Denny	2000 YW_{21}	Denny	December 29, 2000	Desert Beaver	W. K. Y. Yeung	·	6.0 km	MPC · JPL
23258 Tsuihark	2000 YY_{21}	Tsuihark	December 29, 2000	Desert Beaver	W. K. Y. Yeung	·	3.4 km	MPC · JPL
23259 Miwadagakuen	2000 YX_{29}	Miwadagakuen	December 29, 2000	Bisei SG Center	BATTeRS	·	3.2 km	MPC · JPL
23260	2000 YA_{34}	—	December 28, 2000	Socorro	LINEAR	·	4.0 km	MPC · JPL
23261	2000 YQ_{44}	—	December 30, 2000	Socorro	LINEAR	·	4.0 km	MPC · JPL
23262 Thiagoolson	2000 YW_{44}	Thiagoolson	December 30, 2000	Socorro	LINEAR	·	3.0 km	MPC · JPL
23263	2000 YE_{46}	—	December 30, 2000	Socorro	LINEAR	MAR	3.9 km	MPC · JPL
23264	2000 YC_{50}	—	December 30, 2000	Socorro	LINEAR	(5)	3.8 km	MPC · JPL
23265 von Wurden	2000 YO_{50}	von Wurden	December 30, 2000	Socorro	LINEAR	·	2.9 km	MPC · JPL
23266	2000 YP_{50}	—	December 30, 2000	Socorro	LINEAR	NYS	4.7 km	MPC · JPL
23267	2000 YJ_{54}	—	December 30, 2000	Socorro	LINEAR	·	3.6 km	MPC · JPL
23268	2000 YD_{55}	—	December 30, 2000	Socorro	LINEAR	BAP	5.1 km	MPC · JPL
23269	2000 YH_{62}	—	December 30, 2000	Socorro	LINEAR	L4	24 km	MPC · JPL
23270 Kellerman	2000 YN_{62}	Kellerman	December 30, 2000	Socorro	LINEAR	NYS	5.5 km	MPC · JPL
23271 Kellychacon	2000 YO_{67}	Kellychacon	December 28, 2000	Socorro	LINEAR	·	1.8 km	MPC · JPL
23272	2000 YR_{67}	—	December 28, 2000	Socorro	LINEAR	·	3.2 km	MPC · JPL
23273	2000 YM_{75}	—	December 30, 2000	Socorro	LINEAR	·	10 km	MPC · JPL
23274 Wuminchun	2000 YK_{91}	Wuminchun	December 30, 2000	Socorro	LINEAR	EOS	4.5 km	MPC · JPL
23275	2000 YP_{101}	—	December 28, 2000	Socorro	LINEAR	·	11 km	MPC · JPL
23276	2000 YT_{101}	—	December 28, 2000	Socorro	LINEAR	·	6.0 km	MPC · JPL
23277 Benhughes	2000 YC_{104}	Benhughes	December 28, 2000	Socorro	LINEAR	·	2.2 km	MPC · JPL
23278	2000 YD_{105}	—	December 28, 2000	Socorro	LINEAR	·	7.1 km	MPC · JPL
23279 Chenhungjen	2000 YY_{115}	Chenhungjen	December 30, 2000	Socorro	LINEAR	·	2.4 km	MPC · JPL
23280 Laitsaita	2000 YT_{116}	Laitsaita	December 30, 2000	Socorro	LINEAR	·	3.6 km	MPC · JPL
23281 Vijayjain	2000 YY_{116}	Vijayjain	December 30, 2000	Socorro	LINEAR	·	2.1 km	MPC · JPL
23282	2000 YZ_{116}	—	December 30, 2000	Socorro	LINEAR	·	3.7 km	MPC · JPL
23283 Jinjuyi	2000 YP_{117}	Jinjuyi	December 30, 2000	Socorro	LINEAR	·	3.0 km	MPC · JPL
23284 Celik	2000 YD_{118}	Celik	December 30, 2000	Socorro	LINEAR	NYS	2.1 km	MPC · JPL
23285	2000 YH_{119}	—	December 29, 2000	Anderson Mesa	LONEOS	L4	30 km	MPC · JPL
23286 Parlakgul	2000 YH_{120}	Parlakgul	December 19, 2000	Socorro	LINEAR	·	4.5 km	MPC · JPL
23287	2000 YL_{120}	—	December 19, 2000	Socorro	LINEAR	GEF	4.0 km	MPC · JPL
23288	2000 YG_{123}	—	December 28, 2000	Socorro	LINEAR	·	3.8 km	MPC · JPL
23289 Naruhirata	2000 YQ_{126}	Naruhirata	December 29, 2000	Anderson Mesa	LONEOS	·	2.5 km	MPC · JPL
23290	2000 YQ_{127}	—	December 29, 2000	Haleakala	NEAT	(5)	4.2 km	MPC · JPL
23291	2000 YB_{128}	—	December 29, 2000	Haleakala	NEAT	·	1.9 km	MPC · JPL
23292	2000 YH_{128}	—	December 29, 2000	Haleakala	NEAT	·	3.7 km	MPC · JPL
23293	2000 YS_{131}	—	December 30, 2000	Socorro	LINEAR	·	2.8 km	MPC · JPL
23294 Sunao	2000 YJ_{137}	Sunao	December 23, 2000	Anderson Mesa	LONEOS	·	6.8 km	MPC · JPL
23295 Brandoreavis	2000 YK_{137}	Brandoreavis	December 23, 2000	Socorro	LINEAR	·	2.5 km	MPC · JPL
23296 Brianreavis	2001 AR_{3}	Brianreavis	January 2, 2001	Socorro	LINEAR	·	3.4 km	MPC · JPL
23297	2001 AX_{3}	—	January 2, 2001	Socorro	LINEAR	slow	4.1 km	MPC · JPL
23298 Loewenstein	2001 AA_{5}	Loewenstein	January 2, 2001	Socorro	LINEAR	(1338) (FLO)	2.7 km	MPC · JPL
23299	2001 AP_{9}	—	January 2, 2001	Socorro	LINEAR	·	3.4 km	MPC · JPL
23300	2001 AE_{16}	—	January 2, 2001	Socorro	LINEAR	PHO	3.8 km	MPC · JPL

== 23301–23400 ==
back to top

Designation			Discovery			Properties		Ref
Permanent	Provisional	Named after	Date	Site	Discoverer(s)	Category	Diam.	Ref
23301	2001 AO_{16}	—	January 2, 2001	Socorro	LINEAR	T_{j} (2.9)	30 km	MPC · JPL
23302	2001 AB_{17}	—	January 2, 2001	Socorro	LINEAR	EUN	4.7 km	MPC · JPL
23303	2001 AD_{17}	—	January 2, 2001	Socorro	LINEAR	EUN	6.9 km	MPC · JPL
23304	2001 AN_{17}	—	January 2, 2001	Socorro	LINEAR	·	7.4 km	MPC · JPL
23305	2001 AH_{18}	—	January 2, 2001	Socorro	LINEAR	EOS	11 km	MPC · JPL
23306 Adamfields	2001 AC_{20}	Adamfields	January 2, 2001	Socorro	LINEAR	V · slow	3.4 km	MPC · JPL
23307 Alexramek	2001 AG_{20}	Alexramek	January 2, 2001	Socorro	LINEAR	·	1.8 km	MPC · JPL
23308 Niyomsatian	2001 AS_{21}	Niyomsatian	January 3, 2001	Socorro	LINEAR	·	5.7 km	MPC · JPL
23309	2001 AX_{22}	—	January 3, 2001	Socorro	LINEAR	EOS	4.9 km	MPC · JPL
23310 Siriwon	2001 AA_{25}	Siriwon	January 4, 2001	Socorro	LINEAR	·	2.3 km	MPC · JPL
23311	2001 AM_{29}	—	January 4, 2001	Socorro	LINEAR	MAR	5.8 km	MPC · JPL
23312	2001 AV_{41}	—	January 3, 2001	Socorro	LINEAR	·	2.5 km	MPC · JPL
23313 Supokaivanich	2001 AC_{42}	Supokaivanich	January 3, 2001	Socorro	LINEAR	·	2.7 km	MPC · JPL
23314	2001 AU_{44}	—	January 15, 2001	Oizumi	T. Kobayashi	EUN	3.4 km	MPC · JPL
23315 Navinbrian	2001 BN_{8}	Navinbrian	January 19, 2001	Socorro	LINEAR	·	7.9 km	MPC · JPL
23316	2001 BZ_{8}	—	January 19, 2001	Socorro	LINEAR	·	7.9 km	MPC · JPL
23317	2001 BP_{13}	—	January 21, 2001	Socorro	LINEAR	·	2.5 km	MPC · JPL
23318 Salvadorsanchez	2001 BT_{13}	Salvadorsanchez	January 20, 2001	Ametlla de Mar	J. Nomen	·	20 km	MPC · JPL
23319	2001 BR_{14}	—	January 21, 2001	Oizumi	T. Kobayashi	·	5.4 km	MPC · JPL
23320	2001 BP_{15}	—	January 21, 2001	Oizumi	T. Kobayashi	·	1.8 km	MPC · JPL
23321	2001 BY_{16}	—	January 18, 2001	Socorro	LINEAR	·	4.2 km	MPC · JPL
23322 Duyingsewa	2001 BW_{24}	Duyingsewa	January 20, 2001	Socorro	LINEAR	·	2.7 km	MPC · JPL
23323 Anand	2001 BJ_{25}	Anand	January 20, 2001	Socorro	LINEAR	·	6.5 km	MPC · JPL
23324 Kwak	2001 BW_{25}	Kwak	January 20, 2001	Socorro	LINEAR	·	2.9 km	MPC · JPL
23325 Arroyo	2001 BK_{30}	Arroyo	January 20, 2001	Socorro	LINEAR	·	2.1 km	MPC · JPL
23326	2001 BL_{30}	—	January 20, 2001	Socorro	LINEAR	fast	9.6 km	MPC · JPL
23327 Luchernandez	2001 BE_{31}	Luchernandez	January 20, 2001	Socorro	LINEAR	·	2.5 km	MPC · JPL
23328	2001 BM_{34}	—	January 20, 2001	Socorro	LINEAR	·	13 km	MPC · JPL
23329 Josevega	2001 BP_{42}	Josevega	January 19, 2001	Socorro	LINEAR	V	1.5 km	MPC · JPL
23330	2001 BP_{43}	—	January 19, 2001	Socorro	LINEAR	·	1.9 km	MPC · JPL
23331 Halimzeidan	2001 BY_{43}	Halimzeidan	January 19, 2001	Socorro	LINEAR	·	3.7 km	MPC · JPL
23332	2001 BP_{54}	—	January 18, 2001	Kitt Peak	Spacewatch	·	1.8 km	MPC · JPL
23333	2059 P-L	—	September 24, 1960	Palomar	C. J. van Houten, I. van Houten-Groeneveld, T. Gehrels	·	2.7 km	MPC · JPL
23334	2508 P-L	—	September 24, 1960	Palomar	C. J. van Houten, I. van Houten-Groeneveld, T. Gehrels	·	2.1 km	MPC · JPL
23335	2542 P-L	—	September 24, 1960	Palomar	C. J. van Houten, I. van Houten-Groeneveld, T. Gehrels	·	3.5 km	MPC · JPL
23336	2579 P-L	—	September 24, 1960	Palomar	C. J. van Houten, I. van Houten-Groeneveld, T. Gehrels	·	3.5 km	MPC · JPL
23337	2613 P-L	—	September 24, 1960	Palomar	C. J. van Houten, I. van Houten-Groeneveld, T. Gehrels	·	6.1 km	MPC · JPL
23338	2809 P-L	—	September 24, 1960	Palomar	C. J. van Houten, I. van Houten-Groeneveld, T. Gehrels	KOR	3.3 km	MPC · JPL
23339	3025 P-L	—	September 24, 1960	Palomar	C. J. van Houten, I. van Houten-Groeneveld, T. Gehrels	EUN	7.1 km	MPC · JPL
23340	3092 P-L	—	September 24, 1960	Palomar	C. J. van Houten, I. van Houten-Groeneveld, T. Gehrels	slow	4.3 km	MPC · JPL
23341	3503 P-L	—	October 17, 1960	Palomar	C. J. van Houten, I. van Houten-Groeneveld, T. Gehrels	EUN	5.5 km	MPC · JPL
23342	4086 P-L	—	September 24, 1960	Palomar	C. J. van Houten, I. van Houten-Groeneveld, T. Gehrels	·	2.7 km	MPC · JPL
23343	4238 P-L	—	September 24, 1960	Palomar	C. J. van Houten, I. van Houten-Groeneveld, T. Gehrels	·	3.3 km	MPC · JPL
23344	4612 P-L	—	September 24, 1960	Palomar	C. J. van Houten, I. van Houten-Groeneveld, T. Gehrels	·	2.4 km	MPC · JPL
23345	4619 P-L	—	September 24, 1960	Palomar	C. J. van Houten, I. van Houten-Groeneveld, T. Gehrels	·	2.0 km	MPC · JPL
23346	4695 P-L	—	September 24, 1960	Palomar	C. J. van Houten, I. van Houten-Groeneveld, T. Gehrels	·	3.2 km	MPC · JPL
23347	5567 P-L	—	October 17, 1960	Palomar	C. J. van Houten, I. van Houten-Groeneveld, T. Gehrels	·	3.4 km	MPC · JPL
23348	6046 P-L	—	September 24, 1960	Palomar	C. J. van Houten, I. van Houten-Groeneveld, T. Gehrels	ADE	6.8 km	MPC · JPL
23349	6741 P-L	—	September 24, 1960	Palomar	C. J. van Houten, I. van Houten-Groeneveld, T. Gehrels	·	2.8 km	MPC · JPL
23350	6779 P-L	—	September 24, 1960	Palomar	C. J. van Houten, I. van Houten-Groeneveld, T. Gehrels	·	3.2 km	MPC · JPL
23351	6818 P-L	—	September 24, 1960	Palomar	C. J. van Houten, I. van Houten-Groeneveld, T. Gehrels	·	7.1 km	MPC · JPL
23352	7585 P-L	—	October 17, 1960	Palomar	C. J. van Houten, I. van Houten-Groeneveld, T. Gehrels	·	2.6 km	MPC · JPL
23353	9518 P-L	—	October 17, 1960	Palomar	C. J. van Houten, I. van Houten-Groeneveld, T. Gehrels	NYS	5.4 km	MPC · JPL
23354	9547 P-L	—	October 17, 1960	Palomar	C. J. van Houten, I. van Houten-Groeneveld, T. Gehrels	·	3.1 km	MPC · JPL
23355 Elephenor	9602 P-L	Elephenor	October 17, 1960	Palomar	C. J. van Houten, I. van Houten-Groeneveld, T. Gehrels	L4	20 km	MPC · JPL
23356	1194 T-1	—	March 25, 1971	Palomar	C. J. van Houten, I. van Houten-Groeneveld, T. Gehrels	·	6.1 km	MPC · JPL
23357	1285 T-1	—	March 25, 1971	Palomar	C. J. van Houten, I. van Houten-Groeneveld, T. Gehrels	·	3.0 km	MPC · JPL
23358	2194 T-1	—	March 25, 1971	Palomar	C. J. van Houten, I. van Houten-Groeneveld, T. Gehrels	MIS	4.1 km	MPC · JPL
23359	2301 T-1	—	March 25, 1971	Palomar	C. J. van Houten, I. van Houten-Groeneveld, T. Gehrels	(883)	2.9 km	MPC · JPL
23360	3101 T-1	—	March 26, 1971	Palomar	C. J. van Houten, I. van Houten-Groeneveld, T. Gehrels	NYS	4.9 km	MPC · JPL
23361	3243 T-1	—	March 26, 1971	Palomar	C. J. van Houten, I. van Houten-Groeneveld, T. Gehrels	·	2.4 km	MPC · JPL
23362	3248 T-1	—	March 26, 1971	Palomar	C. J. van Houten, I. van Houten-Groeneveld, T. Gehrels	·	1.2 km	MPC · JPL
23363	3770 T-1	—	May 13, 1971	Palomar	C. J. van Houten, I. van Houten-Groeneveld, T. Gehrels	·	2.4 km	MPC · JPL
23364	4060 T-1	—	March 26, 1971	Palomar	C. J. van Houten, I. van Houten-Groeneveld, T. Gehrels	·	1.6 km	MPC · JPL
23365	4217 T-1	—	March 26, 1971	Palomar	C. J. van Houten, I. van Houten-Groeneveld, T. Gehrels	NYS	3.2 km	MPC · JPL
23366	1043 T-2	—	September 29, 1973	Palomar	C. J. van Houten, I. van Houten-Groeneveld, T. Gehrels	·	3.1 km	MPC · JPL
23367	1173 T-2	—	September 29, 1973	Palomar	C. J. van Houten, I. van Houten-Groeneveld, T. Gehrels	EOS	4.6 km	MPC · JPL
23368	1196 T-2	—	September 29, 1973	Palomar	C. J. van Houten, I. van Houten-Groeneveld, T. Gehrels	·	4.1 km	MPC · JPL
23369	1295 T-2	—	September 29, 1973	Palomar	C. J. van Houten, I. van Houten-Groeneveld, T. Gehrels	·	4.2 km	MPC · JPL
23370	1329 T-2	—	September 29, 1973	Palomar	C. J. van Houten, I. van Houten-Groeneveld, T. Gehrels	·	5.6 km	MPC · JPL
23371	1364 T-2	—	September 29, 1973	Palomar	C. J. van Houten, I. van Houten-Groeneveld, T. Gehrels	slow ·	3.4 km	MPC · JPL
23372	1405 T-2	—	September 29, 1973	Palomar	C. J. van Houten, I. van Houten-Groeneveld, T. Gehrels	MAS	1.7 km	MPC · JPL
23373	2133 T-2	—	September 29, 1973	Palomar	C. J. van Houten, I. van Houten-Groeneveld, T. Gehrels	·	2.8 km	MPC · JPL
23374	2207 T-2	—	September 29, 1973	Palomar	C. J. van Houten, I. van Houten-Groeneveld, T. Gehrels	THM	7.7 km	MPC · JPL
23375	2234 T-2	—	September 29, 1973	Palomar	C. J. van Houten, I. van Houten-Groeneveld, T. Gehrels	·	7.5 km	MPC · JPL
23376	2239 T-2	—	September 29, 1973	Palomar	C. J. van Houten, I. van Houten-Groeneveld, T. Gehrels	THM	5.8 km	MPC · JPL
23377	3035 T-2	—	September 30, 1973	Palomar	C. J. van Houten, I. van Houten-Groeneveld, T. Gehrels	NYS	3.3 km	MPC · JPL
23378	3043 T-2	—	September 30, 1973	Palomar	C. J. van Houten, I. van Houten-Groeneveld, T. Gehrels	·	3.0 km	MPC · JPL
23379	3159 T-2	—	September 30, 1973	Palomar	C. J. van Houten, I. van Houten-Groeneveld, T. Gehrels	·	3.6 km	MPC · JPL
23380	3197 T-2	—	September 30, 1973	Palomar	C. J. van Houten, I. van Houten-Groeneveld, T. Gehrels	·	4.2 km	MPC · JPL
23381	3363 T-2	—	September 25, 1973	Palomar	C. J. van Houten, I. van Houten-Groeneveld, T. Gehrels	·	3.8 km	MPC · JPL
23382 Epistrophos	4536 T-2	Epistrophos	September 30, 1973	Palomar	C. J. van Houten, I. van Houten-Groeneveld, T. Gehrels	L4	24 km	MPC · JPL
23383 Schedios	5146 T-2	Schedios	September 25, 1973	Palomar	C. J. van Houten, I. van Houten-Groeneveld, T. Gehrels	L4	20 km	MPC · JPL
23384	5163 T-2	—	September 25, 1973	Palomar	C. J. van Houten, I. van Houten-Groeneveld, T. Gehrels	·	7.2 km	MPC · JPL
23385	5168 T-2	—	September 25, 1973	Palomar	C. J. van Houten, I. van Houten-Groeneveld, T. Gehrels	EOS	5.3 km	MPC · JPL
23386	5179 T-2	—	September 25, 1973	Palomar	C. J. van Houten, I. van Houten-Groeneveld, T. Gehrels	EOS	4.5 km	MPC · JPL
23387	1039 T-3	—	October 17, 1977	Palomar	C. J. van Houten, I. van Houten-Groeneveld, T. Gehrels	·	6.2 km	MPC · JPL
23388	1168 T-3	—	October 17, 1977	Palomar	C. J. van Houten, I. van Houten-Groeneveld, T. Gehrels	EUN	3.8 km	MPC · JPL
23389	1181 T-3	—	October 17, 1977	Palomar	C. J. van Houten, I. van Houten-Groeneveld, T. Gehrels	·	5.9 km	MPC · JPL
23390	1186 T-3	—	October 17, 1977	Palomar	C. J. van Houten, I. van Houten-Groeneveld, T. Gehrels	·	7.1 km	MPC · JPL
23391	2065 T-3	—	October 16, 1977	Palomar	C. J. van Houten, I. van Houten-Groeneveld, T. Gehrels	·	1.7 km	MPC · JPL
23392	2416 T-3	—	October 16, 1977	Palomar	C. J. van Houten, I. van Houten-Groeneveld, T. Gehrels	NYS	5.0 km	MPC · JPL
23393	3283 T-3	—	October 16, 1977	Palomar	C. J. van Houten, I. van Houten-Groeneveld, T. Gehrels	·	3.4 km	MPC · JPL
23394	4340 T-3	—	October 16, 1977	Palomar	C. J. van Houten, I. van Houten-Groeneveld, T. Gehrels	V	2.0 km	MPC · JPL
23395	5018 T-3	—	October 16, 1977	Palomar	C. J. van Houten, I. van Houten-Groeneveld, T. Gehrels	·	4.2 km	MPC · JPL
23396	5112 T-3	—	October 16, 1977	Palomar	C. J. van Houten, I. van Houten-Groeneveld, T. Gehrels	·	3.5 km	MPC · JPL
23397	5122 T-3	—	October 16, 1977	Palomar	C. J. van Houten, I. van Houten-Groeneveld, T. Gehrels	·	5.5 km	MPC · JPL
23398	5124 T-3	—	October 16, 1977	Palomar	C. J. van Houten, I. van Houten-Groeneveld, T. Gehrels	V	2.5 km	MPC · JPL
23399	5132 T-3	—	October 16, 1977	Palomar	C. J. van Houten, I. van Houten-Groeneveld, T. Gehrels	EOS	6.3 km	MPC · JPL
23400	A913 CF	—	February 11, 1913	Mount Hamilton	H. D. Curtis	EOS	4.2 km	MPC · JPL

== 23401–23500 ==
back to top

Designation			Discovery			Properties		Ref
Permanent	Provisional	Named after	Date	Site	Discoverer(s)	Category	Diam.	Ref
23401 Brodskaya	1968 OE_{1}	Brodskaya	July 25, 1968	Cerro El Roble	Plyugin, G. A., Yu. A. Belyaev	·	1.8 km	MPC · JPL
23402 Turchina	1969 TO_{2}	Turchina	October 8, 1969	Nauchnij	L. I. Chernykh	THM	10 km	MPC · JPL
23403 Boudewijnbüch	1971 FB	Boudewijnbüch	March 24, 1971	Palomar	T. Gehrels	PHO	4.4 km	MPC · JPL
23404 Bomans	1972 RG	Bomans	September 15, 1972	Palomar	T. Gehrels	PHO	3.6 km	MPC · JPL
23405 Nisyros	1973 SB_{1}	Nisyros	September 19, 1973	Palomar	C. J. van Houten, I. van Houten-Groeneveld, T. Gehrels	3:2	15 km	MPC · JPL
23406 Kozlov	1977 QO_{3}	Kozlov	August 23, 1977	Nauchnij	N. S. Chernykh	NYS	3.6 km	MPC · JPL
23407	1977 RG_{19}	—	September 9, 1977	Palomar	C. M. Olmstead	·	1.4 km	MPC · JPL
23408 Beijingaoyun	1977 TU_{3}	Beijingaoyun	October 12, 1977	Nanking	Purple Mountain	INA	17 km	MPC · JPL
23409 Derzhavin	1978 QF_{1}	Derzhavin	August 31, 1978	Nauchnij	N. S. Chernykh	·	3.4 km	MPC · JPL
23410 Vikuznetsov	1978 QK_{2}	Vikuznetsov	August 31, 1978	Nauchnij	N. S. Chernykh	·	3.0 km	MPC · JPL
23411 Bayanova	1978 ST_{7}	Bayanova	September 26, 1978	Nauchnij	L. V. Zhuravleva	·	3.6 km	MPC · JPL
23412	1978 UN_{5}	—	October 27, 1978	Palomar	C. M. Olmstead	·	3.5 km	MPC · JPL
23413	1978 VQ_{9}	—	November 7, 1978	Palomar	E. F. Helin, S. J. Bus	EUN	4.9 km	MPC · JPL
23414	1979 MP_{1}	—	June 25, 1979	Siding Spring	E. F. Helin, S. J. Bus	·	5.3 km	MPC · JPL
23415	1979 MQ_{3}	—	June 25, 1979	Siding Spring	E. F. Helin, S. J. Bus	·	5.1 km	MPC · JPL
23416	1979 MU_{4}	—	June 25, 1979	Siding Spring	E. F. Helin, S. J. Bus	·	4.0 km	MPC · JPL
23417	1979 MU_{6}	—	June 25, 1979	Siding Spring	E. F. Helin, S. J. Bus	·	3.4 km	MPC · JPL
23418 Malmbäck	1979 QM_{3}	Malmbäck	August 22, 1979	La Silla	C.-I. Lagerkvist	·	1.8 km	MPC · JPL
23419	1980 FQ_{1}	—	March 16, 1980	La Silla	C.-I. Lagerkvist	EOS	6.5 km	MPC · JPL
23420	1981 DO	—	February 28, 1981	Siding Spring	S. J. Bus	·	2.7 km	MPC · JPL
23421	1981 DR	—	February 28, 1981	Siding Spring	S. J. Bus	NAE	7.9 km	MPC · JPL
23422	1981 DF_{1}	—	February 28, 1981	Siding Spring	S. J. Bus	·	5.9 km	MPC · JPL
23423	1981 EA_{3}	—	March 2, 1981	Siding Spring	S. J. Bus	·	1.9 km	MPC · JPL
23424	1981 EU_{9}	—	March 1, 1981	Siding Spring	S. J. Bus	·	3.4 km	MPC · JPL
23425	1981 EL_{12}	—	March 1, 1981	Siding Spring	S. J. Bus	·	1.7 km	MPC · JPL
23426	1981 EB_{16}	—	March 1, 1981	Siding Spring	S. J. Bus	·	2.0 km	MPC · JPL
23427	1981 EF_{16}	—	March 1, 1981	Siding Spring	S. J. Bus	·	7.1 km	MPC · JPL
23428	1981 EL_{18}	—	March 2, 1981	Siding Spring	S. J. Bus	·	2.2 km	MPC · JPL
23429	1981 EO_{35}	—	March 2, 1981	Siding Spring	S. J. Bus	·	2.1 km	MPC · JPL
23430	1981 EO_{38}	—	March 1, 1981	Siding Spring	S. J. Bus	·	5.1 km	MPC · JPL
23431	1981 EA_{45}	—	March 7, 1981	Siding Spring	S. J. Bus	·	1.5 km	MPC · JPL
23432	1981 EF_{47}	—	March 2, 1981	Siding Spring	S. J. Bus	·	4.3 km	MPC · JPL
23433	1981 UU_{22}	—	October 24, 1981	Palomar	S. J. Bus	VER	13 km	MPC · JPL
23434	1981 UB_{23}	—	October 24, 1981	Palomar	S. J. Bus	·	4.6 km	MPC · JPL
23435	1981 UZ_{24}	—	October 25, 1981	Palomar	S. J. Bus	·	3.7 km	MPC · JPL
23436 Alekfursenko	1982 UF_{8}	Alekfursenko	October 21, 1982	Nauchnij	L. V. Zhuravleva	·	8.4 km	MPC · JPL
23437 Šíma	1984 SJ_{1}	Šíma	September 27, 1984	Kleť	A. Mrkos	·	2.7 km	MPC · JPL
23438	1984 SZ_{5}	—	September 21, 1984	La Silla	H. Debehogne	·	2.2 km	MPC · JPL
23439	1986 PP	—	August 1, 1986	Palomar	E. F. Helin	·	6.7 km	MPC · JPL
23440	1986 QH_{1}	—	August 27, 1986	La Silla	H. Debehogne	·	10 km	MPC · JPL
23441	1986 QW_{1}	—	August 27, 1986	La Silla	H. Debehogne	THM	7.9 km	MPC · JPL
23442	1986 QJ_{2}	—	August 28, 1986	La Silla	H. Debehogne	HYG	11 km	MPC · JPL
23443 Kikwaya	1986 TG_{1}	Kikwaya	October 4, 1986	Anderson Mesa	E. Bowell	MAR	8.0 km	MPC · JPL
23444 Kukučín	1986 TV_{6}	Kukučín	October 5, 1986	Piwnice	M. Antal	·	5.2 km	MPC · JPL
23445	1987 QY_{7}	—	August 21, 1987	La Silla	E. W. Elst	·	7.0 km	MPC · JPL
23446	1987 SJ_{2}	—	September 19, 1987	Smolyan	E. W. Elst	·	6.0 km	MPC · JPL
23447	1987 VG	—	November 15, 1987	Kushiro	S. Ueda, H. Kaneda	·	5.3 km	MPC · JPL
23448 Yasudatakeshi	1988 BG	Yasudatakeshi	January 18, 1988	Kushiro	Matsuyama, M., K. Watanabe	EUN	6.1 km	MPC · JPL
23449	1988 BG_{5}	—	January 28, 1988	Siding Spring	R. H. McNaught	EUN	4.0 km	MPC · JPL
23450 Birkenstock	1988 CB_{4}	Birkenstock	February 13, 1988	La Silla	E. W. Elst	·	2.9 km	MPC · JPL
23451	1988 CO_{7}	—	February 15, 1988	La Silla	E. W. Elst	·	2.2 km	MPC · JPL
23452 Drew	1988 QF	Drew	August 18, 1988	Palomar	C. S. Shoemaker, E. M. Shoemaker	H	1.9 km	MPC · JPL
23453	1988 QR	—	August 19, 1988	Siding Spring	R. H. McNaught	·	10 km	MPC · JPL
23454	1988 XU_{2}	—	December 1, 1988	Brorfelde	P. Jensen	·	5.5 km	MPC · JPL
23455 Fumi	1988 XY_{4}	Fumi	December 5, 1988	Kiso	Nakamura, T.	EOS	8.7 km	MPC · JPL
23456	1989 DB	—	February 26, 1989	Toyota	K. Suzuki, T. Furuta	·	3.9 km	MPC · JPL
23457 Beiderbecke	1989 GV_{6}	Beiderbecke	April 5, 1989	La Silla	Geffert, M.	·	4.4 km	MPC · JPL
23458	1989 RY_{1}	—	September 6, 1989	Palomar	E. F. Helin	·	7.2 km	MPC · JPL
23459	1989 ST_{4}	—	September 26, 1989	La Silla	E. W. Elst	·	9.0 km	MPC · JPL
23460	1989 SX_{9}	—	September 26, 1989	La Silla	H. Debehogne	·	2.4 km	MPC · JPL
23461	1989 TM_{4}	—	October 7, 1989	La Silla	E. W. Elst	·	5.2 km	MPC · JPL
23462	1989 TU_{4}	—	October 7, 1989	La Silla	E. W. Elst	·	3.1 km	MPC · JPL
23463	1989 TX_{11}	—	October 2, 1989	Cerro Tololo	S. J. Bus	L5	26 km	MPC · JPL
23464	1989 TN_{15}	—	October 3, 1989	La Silla	H. Debehogne	·	2.3 km	MPC · JPL
23465 Yamashitakouhei	1989 UA_{1}	Yamashitakouhei	October 24, 1989	Kitami	M. Yanai, K. Watanabe	·	2.9 km	MPC · JPL
23466	1990 DU_{4}	—	February 28, 1990	La Silla	H. Debehogne	·	6.1 km	MPC · JPL
23467	1990 QS_{3}	—	August 20, 1990	Palomar	E. F. Helin	·	2.8 km	MPC · JPL
23468 Kannabe	1990 SS_{3}	Kannabe	September 20, 1990	Geisei	T. Seki	·	7.4 km	MPC · JPL
23469 Neilpeart	1990 SY_{3}	Neilpeart	September 22, 1990	Palomar	B. Roman	EUN	6.3 km	MPC · JPL
23470	1990 SO_{8}	—	September 22, 1990	La Silla	E. W. Elst	·	4.3 km	MPC · JPL
23471 Kawatamasaaki	1990 TH_{3}	Kawatamasaaki	October 15, 1990	Kitami	K. Endate, K. Watanabe	·	8.6 km	MPC · JPL
23472 Rolfriekher	1990 TZ_{10}	Rolfriekher	October 10, 1990	Tautenburg Observatory	L. D. Schmadel, F. Börngen	·	4.1 km	MPC · JPL
23473 Voss	1990 TD_{12}	Voss	October 11, 1990	Tautenburg Observatory	F. Börngen, L. D. Schmadel	·	6.6 km	MPC · JPL
23474	1990 UX_{1}	—	October 20, 1990	Siding Spring	R. H. McNaught	·	4.9 km	MPC · JPL
23475 Nakazawa	1990 VM_{2}	Nakazawa	November 13, 1990	Kitami	K. Endate, K. Watanabe	·	6.2 km	MPC · JPL
23476	1990 VE_{4}	—	November 15, 1990	Ojima	T. Niijima, T. Urata	·	3.8 km	MPC · JPL
23477 Wallenstadt	1990 WS_{1}	Wallenstadt	November 18, 1990	La Silla	E. W. Elst	EUN	5.5 km	MPC · JPL
23478 Chikumagawa	1991 BZ	Chikumagawa	January 21, 1991	Geisei	T. Seki	slow	7.9 km	MPC · JPL
23479	1991 CG	—	February 5, 1991	Yorii	M. Arai, H. Mori	·	14 km	MPC · JPL
23480	1991 EL	—	March 10, 1991	Siding Spring	R. H. McNaught	L4	28 km	MPC · JPL
23481	1991 GT_{4}	—	April 8, 1991	La Silla	E. W. Elst	·	3.3 km	MPC · JPL
23482	1991 LV	—	June 14, 1991	Palomar	E. F. Helin	H	4.5 km	MPC · JPL
23483	1991 LV_{4}	—	June 6, 1991	La Silla	E. W. Elst	·	2.4 km	MPC · JPL
23484	1991 NC_{1}	—	July 12, 1991	Palomar	H. E. Holt	·	6.2 km	MPC · JPL
23485	1991 NV_{6}	—	July 12, 1991	La Silla	H. Debehogne	·	11 km	MPC · JPL
23486	1991 PE_{2}	—	August 2, 1991	La Silla	E. W. Elst	·	1.6 km	MPC · JPL
23487	1991 PX_{4}	—	August 3, 1991	La Silla	E. W. Elst	THM	9.5 km	MPC · JPL
23488	1991 PF_{12}	—	August 7, 1991	Palomar	H. E. Holt	·	4.2 km	MPC · JPL
23489	1991 PU_{16}	—	August 7, 1991	Palomar	H. E. Holt	·	6.8 km	MPC · JPL
23490 Monikohl	1991 RK_{3}	Monikohl	September 12, 1991	Tautenburg Observatory	L. D. Schmadel, F. Börngen	EUN	5.2 km	MPC · JPL
23491	1991 RX_{17}	—	September 13, 1991	Palomar	H. E. Holt	·	4.6 km	MPC · JPL
23492	1991 RA_{20}	—	September 14, 1991	Palomar	H. E. Holt	·	5.4 km	MPC · JPL
23493	1991 SO	—	September 30, 1991	Siding Spring	R. H. McNaught	·	3.3 km	MPC · JPL
23494	1991 SE_{2}	—	September 16, 1991	Palomar	H. E. Holt	NYS	4.7 km	MPC · JPL
23495 Nagaotoshiko	1991 UQ_{1}	Nagaotoshiko	October 29, 1991	Kitami	A. Takahashi, K. Watanabe	·	7.9 km	MPC · JPL
23496	1991 VN_{3}	—	November 3, 1991	Palomar	E. F. Helin	·	3.6 km	MPC · JPL
23497	1991 VG_{4}	—	November 5, 1991	Dynic	A. Sugie	·	3.8 km	MPC · JPL
23498	1991 VH_{6}	—	November 6, 1991	La Silla	E. W. Elst	·	4.0 km	MPC · JPL
23499	1991 VY_{12}	—	November 11, 1991	Kushiro	S. Ueda, H. Kaneda	MRX	4.1 km	MPC · JPL
23500	1992 AT_{2}	—	January 9, 1992	Kitt Peak	Spacewatch	·	4.0 km	MPC · JPL

== 23501–23600 ==
back to top

Designation			Discovery			Properties		Ref
Permanent	Provisional	Named after	Date	Site	Discoverer(s)	Category	Diam.	Ref
23501	1992 CK_{1}	—	February 12, 1992	Mérida	Naranjo, O. A., J. Stock	slow	4.6 km	MPC · JPL
23502	1992 DE_{3}	—	February 25, 1992	Kitt Peak	Spacewatch	·	3.1 km	MPC · JPL
23503	1992 DD_{4}	—	February 29, 1992	Kitt Peak	Spacewatch	·	4.6 km	MPC · JPL
23504 Haneda	1992 EX	Haneda	March 7, 1992	Geisei	T. Seki	·	4.7 km	MPC · JPL
23505	1992 EB_{4}	—	March 1, 1992	La Silla	UESAC	·	3.3 km	MPC · JPL
23506	1992 EC_{8}	—	March 2, 1992	La Silla	UESAC	·	3.8 km	MPC · JPL
23507	1992 EQ_{13}	—	March 2, 1992	La Silla	UESAC	PAD	7.7 km	MPC · JPL
23508	1992 ET_{14}	—	March 1, 1992	La Silla	UESAC	AGN	3.5 km	MPC · JPL
23509	1992 HQ_{3}	—	April 30, 1992	Kitt Peak	Spacewatch	·	3.6 km	MPC · JPL
23510	1992 PA_{2}	—	August 4, 1992	Palomar	H. E. Holt	·	2.2 km	MPC · JPL
23511	1992 PB_{2}	—	August 4, 1992	Palomar	H. E. Holt	(1298)	10 km	MPC · JPL
23512	1992 PC_{3}	—	August 6, 1992	Palomar	H. E. Holt	·	7.8 km	MPC · JPL
23513	1992 PZ_{3}	—	August 2, 1992	Palomar	H. E. Holt	·	3.6 km	MPC · JPL
23514 Schneider	1992 RU	Schneider	September 2, 1992	Tautenburg Observatory	F. Börngen, L. D. Schmadel	·	2.9 km	MPC · JPL
23515	1992 RF_{2}	—	September 2, 1992	La Silla	E. W. Elst	·	2.2 km	MPC · JPL
23516	1992 RK_{2}	—	September 2, 1992	La Silla	E. W. Elst	·	5.9 km	MPC · JPL
23517	1992 RO_{3}	—	September 2, 1992	La Silla	E. W. Elst	·	7.9 km	MPC · JPL
23518	1992 SP_{1}	—	September 20, 1992	Kushiro	S. Ueda, H. Kaneda	·	9.9 km	MPC · JPL
23519	1992 SG_{13}	—	September 23, 1992	Palomar	E. F. Helin	·	2.6 km	MPC · JPL
23520 Ludwigbechstein	1992 SM_{26}	Ludwigbechstein	September 23, 1992	Tautenburg Observatory	F. Börngen	V	1.7 km	MPC · JPL
23521	1992 US_{1}	—	October 21, 1992	Kiyosato	S. Otomo	V	2.8 km	MPC · JPL
23522	1992 WC_{9}	—	November 18, 1992	Kushiro	S. Ueda, H. Kaneda	·	5.1 km	MPC · JPL
23523	1993 AQ	—	January 13, 1993	Kushiro	S. Ueda, H. Kaneda	·	8.9 km	MPC · JPL
23524 Yuichitsuda	1993 BF_{3}	Yuichitsuda	January 23, 1993	Kitami	K. Endate, K. Watanabe	(5)	4.3 km	MPC · JPL
23525	1993 FS_{22}	—	March 21, 1993	La Silla	UESAC	(5)	3.2 km	MPC · JPL
23526	1993 FJ_{32}	—	March 21, 1993	La Silla	UESAC	(5)	2.9 km	MPC · JPL
23527	1993 FD_{37}	—	March 19, 1993	La Silla	UESAC	·	3.4 km	MPC · JPL
23528	1993 FQ_{38}	—	March 19, 1993	La Silla	UESAC	·	2.2 km	MPC · JPL
23529	1993 FR_{45}	—	March 19, 1993	La Silla	UESAC	·	3.5 km	MPC · JPL
23530	1993 FV_{45}	—	March 19, 1993	La Silla	UESAC	·	3.9 km	MPC · JPL
23531	1993 FN_{62}	—	March 19, 1993	La Silla	UESAC	·	3.6 km	MPC · JPL
23532	1993 JG_{1}	—	May 14, 1993	La Silla	E. W. Elst	·	2.7 km	MPC · JPL
23533	1993 PU_{5}	—	August 15, 1993	Caussols	E. W. Elst	AGN	3.4 km	MPC · JPL
23534	1993 QP_{3}	—	August 18, 1993	Caussols	E. W. Elst	·	4.4 km	MPC · JPL
23535	1993 QL_{7}	—	August 20, 1993	La Silla	E. W. Elst	KOR	3.3 km	MPC · JPL
23536	1993 QS_{9}	—	August 20, 1993	La Silla	E. W. Elst	·	4.9 km	MPC · JPL
23537	1993 SA_{6}	—	September 17, 1993	La Silla	E. W. Elst	·	6.5 km	MPC · JPL
23538	1993 TM_{15}	—	October 9, 1993	La Silla	E. W. Elst	·	6.1 km	MPC · JPL
23539	1993 TU_{15}	—	October 9, 1993	La Silla	E. W. Elst	·	6.3 km	MPC · JPL
23540	1993 TV_{19}	—	October 9, 1993	La Silla	E. W. Elst	KOR	5.6 km	MPC · JPL
23541	1993 TU_{29}	—	October 9, 1993	La Silla	E. W. Elst	·	5.4 km	MPC · JPL
23542	1993 TN_{30}	—	October 9, 1993	La Silla	E. W. Elst	·	5.7 km	MPC · JPL
23543 Saiki	1993 UK	Saiki	October 16, 1993	Kitami	K. Endate, K. Watanabe	KOR	7.2 km	MPC · JPL
23544	1993 XW	—	December 11, 1993	Oizumi	T. Kobayashi	·	19 km	MPC · JPL
23545	1994 AC	—	January 2, 1994	Oizumi	T. Kobayashi	·	3.2 km	MPC · JPL
23546	1994 AV_{10}	—	January 8, 1994	Kitt Peak	Spacewatch	·	2.2 km	MPC · JPL
23547 Tognelli	1994 DG	Tognelli	February 17, 1994	San Marcello	L. Tesi, G. Cattani	GEF	4.6 km	MPC · JPL
23548	1994 EF_{2}	—	March 11, 1994	Palomar	K. J. Lawrence	AMO +1km	1.2 km	MPC · JPL
23549 Epicles	1994 ES_{6}	Epicles	March 9, 1994	Caussols	E. W. Elst	L5	18 km	MPC · JPL
23550	1994 GK_{9}	—	April 11, 1994	Palomar	E. F. Helin	·	3.7 km	MPC · JPL
23551	1994 GO_{9}	—	April 11, 1994	Palomar	E. F. Helin	·	5.0 km	MPC · JPL
23552	1994 NB	—	July 3, 1994	Palomar	E. F. Helin	·	7.6 km	MPC · JPL
23553	1994 PL_{4}	—	August 10, 1994	La Silla	E. W. Elst	·	5.1 km	MPC · JPL
23554	1994 PJ_{11}	—	August 10, 1994	La Silla	E. W. Elst	NYS	4.9 km	MPC · JPL
23555	1994 PP_{15}	—	August 10, 1994	La Silla	E. W. Elst	·	2.7 km	MPC · JPL
23556	1994 PY_{25}	—	August 12, 1994	La Silla	E. W. Elst	·	3.5 km	MPC · JPL
23557	1994 PU_{26}	—	August 12, 1994	La Silla	E. W. Elst	·	2.1 km	MPC · JPL
23558	1994 PW_{26}	—	August 12, 1994	La Silla	E. W. Elst	·	5.5 km	MPC · JPL
23559	1994 PD_{32}	—	August 12, 1994	La Silla	E. W. Elst	·	3.0 km	MPC · JPL
23560	1994 RX_{8}	—	September 12, 1994	Kitt Peak	Spacewatch	·	7.6 km	MPC · JPL
23561	1994 RM_{12}	—	September 1, 1994	Palomar	E. F. Helin	EUN	3.5 km	MPC · JPL
23562 Hyodokenichi	1994 TR_{1}	Hyodokenichi	October 2, 1994	Kitami	K. Endate, K. Watanabe	·	7.4 km	MPC · JPL
23563	1994 UP_{8}	—	October 28, 1994	Kitt Peak	Spacewatch	·	5.5 km	MPC · JPL
23564 Ungaretti	1994 VX_{1}	Ungaretti	November 6, 1994	Colleverde	V. S. Casulli	·	5.6 km	MPC · JPL
23565	1994 WB	—	November 23, 1994	Sudbury	D. di Cicco	EUN	4.7 km	MPC · JPL
23566	1994 WS_{1}	—	November 27, 1994	Oizumi	T. Kobayashi	·	7.4 km	MPC · JPL
23567	1994 YG	—	December 21, 1994	Oizumi	T. Kobayashi	·	6.6 km	MPC · JPL
23568	1994 YU	—	December 28, 1994	Oizumi	T. Kobayashi	EOS	6.2 km	MPC · JPL
23569	1994 YF_{1}	—	December 28, 1994	Oizumi	T. Kobayashi	·	7.5 km	MPC · JPL
23570	1995 AA	—	January 1, 1995	Chiyoda	T. Kojima	·	6.8 km	MPC · JPL
23571 Zuaboni	1995 AB	Zuaboni	January 1, 1995	Sormano	M. Cavagna, Galliani, E.	·	5.9 km	MPC · JPL
23572	1995 AS_{2}	—	January 10, 1995	Chiyoda	T. Kojima	·	8.1 km	MPC · JPL
23573	1995 BG	—	January 23, 1995	Oizumi	T. Kobayashi	EOS	8.6 km	MPC · JPL
23574	1995 BX	—	January 25, 1995	Oizumi	T. Kobayashi	·	8.3 km	MPC · JPL
23575	1995 BE_{2}	—	January 30, 1995	Oizumi	T. Kobayashi	EOS	6.5 km	MPC · JPL
23576	1995 DZ_{3}	—	February 21, 1995	Kitt Peak	Spacewatch	·	6.9 km	MPC · JPL
23577	1995 DY_{8}	—	February 24, 1995	Kitt Peak	Spacewatch	CYB · 2:1J (unstable)	7.6 km	MPC · JPL
23578 Baedeker	1995 DR_{13}	Baedeker	February 22, 1995	Tautenburg Observatory	F. Börngen	THM	9.7 km	MPC · JPL
23579	1995 EN_{5}	—	March 2, 1995	Kitt Peak	Spacewatch	·	8.2 km	MPC · JPL
23580	1995 OZ_{2}	—	July 22, 1995	Kitt Peak	Spacewatch	V	1.2 km	MPC · JPL
23581	1995 OE_{5}	—	July 22, 1995	Kitt Peak	Spacewatch	·	3.3 km	MPC · JPL
23582	1995 QA_{3}	—	August 31, 1995	Oizumi	T. Kobayashi	·	3.8 km	MPC · JPL
23583 Křivský	1995 SJ_{1}	Křivský	September 22, 1995	Ondřejov	L. Kotková	·	5.2 km	MPC · JPL
23584	1995 SB_{31}	—	September 20, 1995	Kitt Peak	Spacewatch	·	2.5 km	MPC · JPL
23585	1995 SD_{53}	—	September 28, 1995	Xinglong	SCAP	·	2.0 km	MPC · JPL
23586	1995 TA_{1}	—	October 13, 1995	Chichibu	N. Satō, T. Urata	·	4.6 km	MPC · JPL
23587 Abukumado	1995 TE_{8}	Abukumado	October 2, 1995	Geisei	T. Seki	·	4.2 km	MPC · JPL
23588	1995 UX_{3}	—	October 20, 1995	Oizumi	T. Kobayashi	V	2.6 km	MPC · JPL
23589 Silvmellini	1995 UR_{6}	Silvmellini	October 23, 1995	San Marcello	L. Tesi, A. Boattini	·	3.1 km	MPC · JPL
23590	1995 UD_{34}	—	October 21, 1995	Kitt Peak	Spacewatch	·	2.6 km	MPC · JPL
23591 Yanagisawa	1995 UP_{44}	Yanagisawa	October 26, 1995	Nyukasa	M. Hirasawa, S. Suzuki	V	3.1 km	MPC · JPL
23592	1995 UB_{47}	—	October 27, 1995	Kushiro	S. Ueda, H. Kaneda	EOS	6.4 km	MPC · JPL
23593	1995 VJ	—	November 2, 1995	Oizumi	T. Kobayashi	·	3.5 km	MPC · JPL
23594	1995 VJ_{2}	—	November 13, 1995	Nachi-Katsuura	Y. Shimizu, T. Urata	PHO	3.5 km	MPC · JPL
23595	1995 VR_{11}	—	November 15, 1995	Kitt Peak	Spacewatch	·	4.7 km	MPC · JPL
23596	1995 WQ	—	November 17, 1995	Oizumi	T. Kobayashi	·	4.1 km	MPC · JPL
23597	1995 WY_{4}	—	November 24, 1995	Oizumi	T. Kobayashi	NYS	3.7 km	MPC · JPL
23598	1995 WL_{13}	—	November 16, 1995	Kitt Peak	Spacewatch	·	4.0 km	MPC · JPL
23599	1995 XV	—	December 12, 1995	Oizumi	T. Kobayashi	·	3.3 km	MPC · JPL
23600	1995 XC_{1}	—	December 15, 1995	Oizumi	T. Kobayashi	·	5.4 km	MPC · JPL

== 23601–23700 ==
back to top

Designation			Discovery			Properties		Ref
Permanent	Provisional	Named after	Date	Site	Discoverer(s)	Category	Diam.	Ref
23601	1995 YC_{5}	—	December 16, 1995	Kitt Peak	Spacewatch	·	3.4 km	MPC · JPL
23602	1995 YK_{20}	—	December 23, 1995	Kitt Peak	Spacewatch	slow	9.5 km	MPC · JPL
23603	1995 YM_{23}	—	December 21, 1995	Haleakala	NEAT	·	5.5 km	MPC · JPL
23604	1996 AL	—	January 11, 1996	Oizumi	T. Kobayashi	·	7.0 km	MPC · JPL
23605	1996 AP	—	January 11, 1996	Oizumi	T. Kobayashi	EUN	5.0 km	MPC · JPL
23606	1996 AS_{1}	—	January 13, 1996	Kitt Peak	Spacewatch	AMO	870 m	MPC · JPL
23607	1996 AR_{2}	—	January 13, 1996	Oizumi	T. Kobayashi	EUN	5.2 km	MPC · JPL
23608 Alpiapuane	1996 AC_{4}	Alpiapuane	January 15, 1996	Cima Ekar	M. Tombelli, U. Munari	EUN	4.6 km	MPC · JPL
23609	1996 AU_{6}	—	January 12, 1996	Kitt Peak	Spacewatch	·	3.4 km	MPC · JPL
23610	1996 AW_{7}	—	January 12, 1996	Kitt Peak	Spacewatch	·	7.2 km	MPC · JPL
23611	1996 BO_{3}	—	January 27, 1996	Oohira	T. Urata	·	3.2 km	MPC · JPL
23612 Ramzel	1996 BJ_{4}	Ramzel	January 22, 1996	Socorro	R. Weber	EUN	5.0 km	MPC · JPL
23613	1996 EK_{6}	—	March 11, 1996	Kitt Peak	Spacewatch	·	9.2 km	MPC · JPL
23614	1996 FX	—	March 18, 1996	Haleakala	NEAT	·	4.3 km	MPC · JPL
23615	1996 FK_{12}	—	March 28, 1996	Siding Spring	R. H. McNaught	H · slow	3.5 km	MPC · JPL
23616	1996 HY_{10}	—	April 17, 1996	La Silla	E. W. Elst	EOS	5.8 km	MPC · JPL
23617 Duna	1996 HM_{13}	Duna	April 17, 1996	La Silla	E. W. Elst	URS	16 km	MPC · JPL
23618	1996 JS_{5}	—	May 11, 1996	Kitt Peak	Spacewatch	·	8.2 km	MPC · JPL
23619	1996 JX_{7}	—	May 12, 1996	Kitt Peak	Spacewatch	·	5.8 km	MPC · JPL
23620	1996 LS_{2}	—	June 11, 1996	Kitt Peak	Spacewatch	·	11 km	MPC · JPL
23621	1996 PA	—	August 5, 1996	Siding Spring	G. J. Garradd	moon	1.8 km	MPC · JPL
23622	1996 RW_{29}	—	September 12, 1996	La Silla	Uppsala-DLR Trojan Survey	L4	21 km	MPC · JPL
23623	1996 TR_{29}	—	October 7, 1996	Kitt Peak	Spacewatch	·	1.8 km	MPC · JPL
23624	1996 UX_{3}	—	October 29, 1996	Xinglong	SCAP	L4	27 km	MPC · JPL
23625 Gelfond	1996 WX	Gelfond	November 19, 1996	Prescott	P. G. Comba	fast	1.7 km	MPC · JPL
23626	1996 XD_{3}	—	December 3, 1996	Oizumi	T. Kobayashi	·	2.7 km	MPC · JPL
23627	1996 XG_{19}	—	December 8, 1996	Oizumi	T. Kobayashi	·	2.7 km	MPC · JPL
23628 Ichimura	1996 XZ_{31}	Ichimura	December 8, 1996	Chichibu	N. Satō	·	2.4 km	MPC · JPL
23629	1996 YR	—	December 20, 1996	Oizumi	T. Kobayashi	·	2.9 km	MPC · JPL
23630	1996 YA_{3}	—	December 30, 1996	Chichibu	N. Satō	·	2.2 km	MPC · JPL
23631	1997 AG	—	January 2, 1997	Oizumi	T. Kobayashi	·	3.9 km	MPC · JPL
23632	1997 AQ	—	January 2, 1997	Oizumi	T. Kobayashi	·	2.7 km	MPC · JPL
23633	1997 AF_{3}	—	January 4, 1997	Oizumi	T. Kobayashi	·	5.2 km	MPC · JPL
23634	1997 AY_{3}	—	January 6, 1997	Oizumi	T. Kobayashi	·	3.7 km	MPC · JPL
23635	1997 AH_{4}	—	January 6, 1997	Oizumi	T. Kobayashi	NYS	2.4 km	MPC · JPL
23636	1997 AJ_{4}	—	January 6, 1997	Oizumi	T. Kobayashi	·	3.8 km	MPC · JPL
23637	1997 AM_{6}	—	January 4, 1997	Xinglong	SCAP	V	1.7 km	MPC · JPL
23638 Nagano	1997 AV_{6}	Nagano	January 6, 1997	Chichibu	N. Satō	·	2.6 km	MPC · JPL
23639	1997 AN_{7}	—	January 9, 1997	Oizumi	T. Kobayashi	·	3.6 km	MPC · JPL
23640	1997 AY_{7}	—	January 2, 1997	Kitt Peak	Spacewatch	V	2.9 km	MPC · JPL
23641	1997 AU_{10}	—	January 9, 1997	Kitt Peak	Spacewatch	V	2.4 km	MPC · JPL
23642	1997 AD_{15}	—	January 9, 1997	Oohira	T. Urata	·	4.6 km	MPC · JPL
23643	1997 AQ_{15}	—	January 12, 1997	Haleakala	NEAT	·	2.9 km	MPC · JPL
23644 Yamaneko	1997 AW_{17}	Yamaneko	January 13, 1997	Kuma Kogen	A. Nakamura	MAS	2.2 km	MPC · JPL
23645	1997 BJ_{2}	—	January 30, 1997	Oizumi	T. Kobayashi	·	2.5 km	MPC · JPL
23646	1997 BX_{2}	—	January 30, 1997	Oizumi	T. Kobayashi	·	2.3 km	MPC · JPL
23647	1997 BR_{3}	—	January 31, 1997	Oizumi	T. Kobayashi	PHO	3.2 km	MPC · JPL
23648 Kolář	1997 CB	Kolář	February 1, 1997	Ondřejov	L. Kotková	·	5.6 km	MPC · JPL
23649 Tohoku	1997 CJ_{5}	Tohoku	February 1, 1997	Chichibu	N. Satō	MAS	2.0 km	MPC · JPL
23650 Čvančara	1997 CU_{5}	Čvančara	February 7, 1997	Kleť	M. Tichý	·	2.4 km	MPC · JPL
23651	1997 CN_{12}	—	February 3, 1997	Kitt Peak	Spacewatch	·	2.4 km	MPC · JPL
23652	1997 CW_{19}	—	February 12, 1997	Oizumi	T. Kobayashi	NYS	3.2 km	MPC · JPL
23653	1997 CE_{21}	—	February 6, 1997	Kitt Peak	Spacewatch	·	2.7 km	MPC · JPL
23654	1997 CC_{26}	—	February 13, 1997	Oohira	T. Urata	·	3.3 km	MPC · JPL
23655	1997 CG_{26}	—	February 14, 1997	Oizumi	T. Kobayashi	·	4.0 km	MPC · JPL
23656	1997 CK_{26}	—	February 14, 1997	Oizumi	T. Kobayashi	·	4.0 km	MPC · JPL
23657	1997 CB_{28}	—	February 6, 1997	Xinglong	SCAP	·	3.5 km	MPC · JPL
23658	1997 CC_{28}	—	February 6, 1997	Xinglong	SCAP	MAS	1.8 km	MPC · JPL
23659	1997 EH	—	March 1, 1997	Oizumi	T. Kobayashi	NYS ·	6.7 km	MPC · JPL
23660	1997 ED_{5}	—	March 4, 1997	Kitt Peak	Spacewatch	(5)	2.7 km	MPC · JPL
23661	1997 EL_{16}	—	March 5, 1997	Kitt Peak	Spacewatch	·	2.1 km	MPC · JPL
23662 Jozankei	1997 ES_{17}	Jozankei	March 3, 1997	Kitami	K. Endate, K. Watanabe	·	5.6 km	MPC · JPL
23663 Kalou	1997 EG_{18}	Kalou	March 10, 1997	Arbonne-la-Forêt	Meunier, M.	V	2.1 km	MPC · JPL
23664	1997 EP_{25}	—	March 5, 1997	Oohira	T. Urata	·	3.2 km	MPC · JPL
23665	1997 EU_{46}	—	March 12, 1997	La Silla	E. W. Elst	NYS	4.8 km	MPC · JPL
23666	1997 FT_{1}	—	March 30, 1997	Kitt Peak	Spacewatch	fast	3.4 km	MPC · JPL
23667 Savinakim	1997 FM_{4}	Savinakim	March 31, 1997	Socorro	LINEAR	·	3.8 km	MPC · JPL
23668 Eunbekim	1997 FR_{4}	Eunbekim	March 31, 1997	Socorro	LINEAR	NYS	3.1 km	MPC · JPL
23669 Huihuifan	1997 FB_{5}	Huihuifan	March 31, 1997	Socorro	LINEAR	(5)	3.7 km	MPC · JPL
23670	1997 GX_{14}	—	April 3, 1997	Socorro	LINEAR	ADE	6.3 km	MPC · JPL
23671	1997 GX_{18}	—	April 3, 1997	Socorro	LINEAR	·	2.7 km	MPC · JPL
23672 Swiggum	1997 GR_{21}	Swiggum	April 6, 1997	Socorro	LINEAR	EUN	3.2 km	MPC · JPL
23673 Neilmehta	1997 GB_{23}	Neilmehta	April 6, 1997	Socorro	LINEAR	·	3.8 km	MPC · JPL
23674 Juliebaker	1997 GJ_{23}	Juliebaker	April 6, 1997	Socorro	LINEAR	EUN	3.5 km	MPC · JPL
23675 Zabinski	1997 GU_{23}	Zabinski	April 6, 1997	Socorro	LINEAR	MAR	3.5 km	MPC · JPL
23676 Tomitayoshihiro	1997 GR_{25}	Tomitayoshihiro	April 4, 1997	Kitami	K. Endate, K. Watanabe	NYS	4.8 km	MPC · JPL
23677	1997 GV_{32}	—	April 3, 1997	Socorro	LINEAR	EUN	4.1 km	MPC · JPL
23678	1997 GW_{32}	—	April 3, 1997	Socorro	LINEAR	·	2.7 km	MPC · JPL
23679 Andrewmoore	1997 GM_{33}	Andrewmoore	April 3, 1997	Socorro	LINEAR	MAR	4.0 km	MPC · JPL
23680 Kerryking	1997 GL_{34}	Kerryking	April 3, 1997	Socorro	LINEAR	NYS	5.0 km	MPC · JPL
23681 Prabhu	1997 GC_{36}	Prabhu	April 6, 1997	Socorro	LINEAR	·	3.4 km	MPC · JPL
23682	1997 GT_{40}	—	April 7, 1997	La Silla	E. W. Elst	KOR	3.7 km	MPC · JPL
23683	1997 HO_{1}	—	April 28, 1997	Kitt Peak	Spacewatch	·	3.8 km	MPC · JPL
23684	1997 HB_{10}	—	April 30, 1997	Socorro	LINEAR	·	3.9 km	MPC · JPL
23685 Toaldo	1997 JV	Toaldo	May 1, 1997	Bologna	San Vittore	·	4.6 km	MPC · JPL
23686 Songyuan	1997 JZ_{7}	Songyuan	May 8, 1997	Xinglong	SCAP	EUN	5.1 km	MPC · JPL
23687	1997 JA_{11}	—	May 8, 1997	Kitt Peak	Spacewatch	·	12 km	MPC · JPL
23688 Josephjoachim	1997 JJ_{11}	Josephjoachim	May 3, 1997	La Silla	E. W. Elst	·	4.9 km	MPC · JPL
23689 Jancuypers	1997 JC_{13}	Jancuypers	May 3, 1997	La Silla	E. W. Elst	·	5.7 km	MPC · JPL
23690 Jiangwenhan	1997 JD_{14}	Jiangwenhan	May 9, 1997	Xinglong	SCAP	·	7.3 km	MPC · JPL
23691 Jefneve	1997 JN_{16}	Jefneve	May 3, 1997	La Silla	E. W. Elst	(5)	10 km	MPC · JPL
23692 Nandatianwenners	1997 KA	Nandatianwenners	May 20, 1997	Xinglong	SCAP	·	7.1 km	MPC · JPL
23693	1997 KU_{2}	—	May 30, 1997	Kitt Peak	Spacewatch	EUN	4.5 km	MPC · JPL
23694	1997 KZ_{3}	—	May 29, 1997	Kitt Peak	Spacewatch	L5	32 km	MPC · JPL
23695	1997 MS_{4}	—	June 28, 1997	Socorro	LINEAR	·	10 km	MPC · JPL
23696	1997 MV_{4}	—	June 28, 1997	Socorro	LINEAR	·	7.4 km	MPC · JPL
23697	1997 MK_{9}	—	June 26, 1997	Kitt Peak	Spacewatch	·	2.8 km	MPC · JPL
23698	1997 NA_{3}	—	July 4, 1997	Xinglong	SCAP	ANF	4.6 km	MPC · JPL
23699 Paulgordan	1997 ND_{3}	Paulgordan	July 8, 1997	Prescott	P. G. Comba	·	3.9 km	MPC · JPL
23700 Maríagalán	1997 OZ	Maríagalán	July 25, 1997	Majorca	R. Pacheco, Á. López J.	THM	5.9 km	MPC · JPL

== 23701–23800 ==
back to top

Designation			Discovery			Properties		Ref
Permanent	Provisional	Named after	Date	Site	Discoverer(s)	Category	Diam.	Ref
23701 Liqibin	1997 PC_{1}	Liqibin	August 3, 1997	Xinglong	SCAP	THM	8.1 km	MPC · JPL
23702	1997 QE_{1}	—	August 28, 1997	Cloudcroft	W. Offutt	·	9.0 km	MPC · JPL
23703	1997 RJ_{1}	—	September 3, 1997	Oohira	T. Urata	HYG	9.7 km	MPC · JPL
23704	1997 SD_{10}	—	September 23, 1997	Xinglong	SCAP	·	3.7 km	MPC · JPL
23705	1997 SQ_{14}	—	September 28, 1997	Kitt Peak	Spacewatch	·	6.1 km	MPC · JPL
23706	1997 SY_{32}	—	September 29, 1997	Kitt Peak	Spacewatch	L4	14 km	MPC · JPL
23707 Chambliss	1997 TZ_{7}	Chambliss	October 4, 1997	Chinle	Bruton, J.	TIR	7.2 km	MPC · JPL
23708	1997 TR_{18}	—	October 5, 1997	Xinglong	SCAP	EOS	8.5 km	MPC · JPL
23709	1997 TA_{28}	—	October 1, 1997	La Silla	Uppsala-DLR Trojan Survey	L4	20 km	MPC · JPL
23710	1997 UJ	—	October 20, 1997	Ondřejov	L. Kotková	L4	17 km	MPC · JPL
23711	1997 UT_{2}	—	October 25, 1997	Oohira	T. Urata	·	13 km	MPC · JPL
23712 Willpatrick	1998 AA	Willpatrick	January 1, 1998	Needville	Dillon, W. G., Dillon, E. R.	PHO	7.7 km	MPC · JPL
23713	1998 EQ_{2}	—	March 2, 1998	Caussols	ODAS	·	1.5 km	MPC · JPL
23714	1998 EC_{3}	—	March 1, 1998	Oizumi	T. Kobayashi	AMO +1km	1.5 km	MPC · JPL
23715	1998 FK_{2}	—	March 20, 1998	Socorro	LINEAR	H	2.4 km	MPC · JPL
23716	1998 FA_{107}	—	March 31, 1998	Socorro	LINEAR	·	2.1 km	MPC · JPL
23717 Kaddoura	1998 FW_{118}	Kaddoura	March 31, 1998	Socorro	LINEAR	·	2.9 km	MPC · JPL
23718 Horgos	1998 GO_{10}	Horgos	April 2, 1998	Piszkéstető	K. Sárneczky, L. Kiss	·	2.9 km	MPC · JPL
23719	1998 HG_{23}	—	April 20, 1998	Socorro	LINEAR	·	1.7 km	MPC · JPL
23720	1998 HG_{26}	—	April 20, 1998	Kitt Peak	Spacewatch	·	3.8 km	MPC · JPL
23721	1998 HQ_{27}	—	April 22, 1998	Kitt Peak	Spacewatch	·	3.6 km	MPC · JPL
23722 Gulak	1998 HD_{32}	Gulak	April 20, 1998	Socorro	LINEAR	·	2.9 km	MPC · JPL
23723	1998 HG_{40}	—	April 20, 1998	Socorro	LINEAR	·	1.5 km	MPC · JPL
23724	1998 HW_{41}	—	April 24, 1998	Kitt Peak	Spacewatch	·	1.9 km	MPC · JPL
23725	1998 HH_{43}	—	April 23, 1998	Haleakala	NEAT	·	2.9 km	MPC · JPL
23726	1998 HG_{48}	—	April 20, 1998	Socorro	LINEAR	·	3.1 km	MPC · JPL
23727 Akihasan	1998 HO_{52}	Akihasan	April 30, 1998	Nanyo	T. Okuni	·	2.6 km	MPC · JPL
23728 Jasonmorrow	1998 HV_{63}	Jasonmorrow	April 21, 1998	Socorro	LINEAR	·	3.4 km	MPC · JPL
23729 Kemeisha	1998 HH_{80}	Kemeisha	April 21, 1998	Socorro	LINEAR	(2076)	3.6 km	MPC · JPL
23730 Suncar	1998 HX_{89}	Suncar	April 21, 1998	Socorro	LINEAR	·	3.0 km	MPC · JPL
23731	1998 HA_{93}	—	April 21, 1998	Socorro	LINEAR	NYS	2.7 km	MPC · JPL
23732 Choiseungjae	1998 HV_{95}	Choiseungjae	April 21, 1998	Socorro	LINEAR	·	3.0 km	MPC · JPL
23733 Hyojiyun	1998 HE_{123}	Hyojiyun	April 23, 1998	Socorro	LINEAR	·	3.1 km	MPC · JPL
23734 Kimgyehyun	1998 HK_{124}	Kimgyehyun	April 23, 1998	Socorro	LINEAR	·	3.3 km	MPC · JPL
23735 Cohen	1998 HM_{134}	Cohen	April 19, 1998	Socorro	LINEAR	(2076)	3.4 km	MPC · JPL
23736	1998 HO_{148}	—	April 25, 1998	La Silla	E. W. Elst	·	2.2 km	MPC · JPL
23737	1998 HW_{150}	—	April 21, 1998	Kitt Peak	Spacewatch	·	5.0 km	MPC · JPL
23738 van Zyl	1998 JZ_{1}	van Zyl	May 1, 1998	Haleakala	NEAT	·	3.7 km	MPC · JPL
23739 Kevin	1998 KS_{1}	Kevin	May 18, 1998	Anderson Mesa	LONEOS	·	2.6 km	MPC · JPL
23740	1998 KP_{3}	—	May 25, 1998	Woomera	F. B. Zoltowski	V	2.4 km	MPC · JPL
23741 Takaaki	1998 KB_{4}	Takaaki	May 22, 1998	Anderson Mesa	LONEOS	·	6.2 km	MPC · JPL
23742 Okadatatsuaki	1998 KW_{4}	Okadatatsuaki	May 22, 1998	Anderson Mesa	LONEOS	·	2.0 km	MPC · JPL
23743 Toshikasuga	1998 KT_{6}	Toshikasuga	May 22, 1998	Anderson Mesa	LONEOS	·	2.1 km	MPC · JPL
23744 Ootsubo	1998 KX_{6}	Ootsubo	May 22, 1998	Anderson Mesa	LONEOS	·	2.6 km	MPC · JPL
23745 Liadawley	1998 KZ_{15}	Liadawley	May 22, 1998	Socorro	LINEAR	·	2.0 km	MPC · JPL
23746	1998 KQ_{19}	—	May 22, 1998	Socorro	LINEAR	·	2.2 km	MPC · JPL
23747 Rahaelgupta	1998 KW_{25}	Rahaelgupta	May 22, 1998	Socorro	LINEAR	NYS ·	5.4 km	MPC · JPL
23748 Kaarethode	1998 KF_{28}	Kaarethode	May 22, 1998	Socorro	LINEAR	(2076)	3.4 km	MPC · JPL
23749 Thygesen	1998 KL_{30}	Thygesen	May 22, 1998	Socorro	LINEAR	·	3.2 km	MPC · JPL
23750 Stepciechan	1998 KQ_{35}	Stepciechan	May 22, 1998	Socorro	LINEAR	V	2.0 km	MPC · JPL
23751 Davidprice	1998 KL_{37}	Davidprice	May 22, 1998	Socorro	LINEAR	V	3.0 km	MPC · JPL
23752 Jacobshapiro	1998 KB_{41}	Jacobshapiro	May 22, 1998	Socorro	LINEAR	·	1.9 km	MPC · JPL
23753 Busdicker	1998 KP_{41}	Busdicker	May 22, 1998	Socorro	LINEAR	·	2.1 km	MPC · JPL
23754 Rachnareddy	1998 KV_{46}	Rachnareddy	May 22, 1998	Socorro	LINEAR	·	3.7 km	MPC · JPL
23755 Sergiolozano	1998 KY_{46}	Sergiolozano	May 22, 1998	Socorro	LINEAR	·	2.3 km	MPC · JPL
23756 Daniellozano	1998 KE_{47}	Daniellozano	May 22, 1998	Socorro	LINEAR	·	2.6 km	MPC · JPL
23757 Jonmunoz	1998 KL_{48}	Jonmunoz	May 22, 1998	Socorro	LINEAR	V	2.3 km	MPC · JPL
23758 Guyuzhou	1998 KG_{51}	Guyuzhou	May 23, 1998	Socorro	LINEAR	·	4.5 km	MPC · JPL
23759 Wangzhaoxin	1998 KS_{56}	Wangzhaoxin	May 22, 1998	Socorro	LINEAR	·	1.8 km	MPC · JPL
23760	1998 KM_{61}	—	May 23, 1998	Socorro	LINEAR	·	2.0 km	MPC · JPL
23761 Yangliqing	1998 KJ_{63}	Yangliqing	May 22, 1998	Socorro	LINEAR	·	3.0 km	MPC · JPL
23762	1998 KF_{64}	—	May 22, 1998	Socorro	LINEAR	·	2.9 km	MPC · JPL
23763	1998 MP_{7}	—	June 24, 1998	Lime Creek	R. Linderholm	·	6.4 km	MPC · JPL
23764	1998 MR_{15}	—	June 21, 1998	Kitt Peak	Spacewatch	EUN	2.9 km	MPC · JPL
23765	1998 MN_{16}	—	June 27, 1998	Kitt Peak	Spacewatch	EUN	5.3 km	MPC · JPL
23766	1998 MZ_{23}	—	June 25, 1998	Kitt Peak	Spacewatch	V	4.5 km	MPC · JPL
23767	1998 MG_{31}	—	June 24, 1998	Socorro	LINEAR	·	4.7 km	MPC · JPL
23768 Abu-Rmaileh	1998 MT_{32}	Abu-Rmaileh	June 24, 1998	Socorro	LINEAR	·	3.6 km	MPC · JPL
23769 Russellbabb	1998 MP_{33}	Russellbabb	June 24, 1998	Socorro	LINEAR	·	7.1 km	MPC · JPL
23770	1998 MQ_{35}	—	June 24, 1998	Socorro	LINEAR	·	1.8 km	MPC · JPL
23771 Emaitchar	1998 MR_{37}	Emaitchar	June 24, 1998	Anderson Mesa	LONEOS	·	4.1 km	MPC · JPL
23772 Masateru	1998 MU_{37}	Masateru	June 24, 1998	Anderson Mesa	LONEOS	·	3.7 km	MPC · JPL
23773 Sarugaku	1998 MV_{37}	Sarugaku	June 24, 1998	Anderson Mesa	LONEOS	PHO	5.3 km	MPC · JPL
23774 Herbelliott	1998 MZ_{41}	Herbelliott	June 26, 1998	Reedy Creek	J. Broughton	EUN	3.5 km	MPC · JPL
23775 Okudaira	1998 PE	Okudaira	August 2, 1998	Anderson Mesa	LONEOS	·	2.6 km	MPC · JPL
23776 Gosset	1998 QE	Gosset	August 17, 1998	Prescott	P. G. Comba	·	5.0 km	MPC · JPL
23777 Goursat	1998 QT_{5}	Goursat	August 23, 1998	Prescott	P. G. Comba	EOS	7.0 km	MPC · JPL
23778	1998 QO_{7}	—	August 17, 1998	Socorro	LINEAR	·	6.5 km	MPC · JPL
23779 Cambier	1998 QL_{10}	Cambier	August 17, 1998	Socorro	LINEAR	·	2.8 km	MPC · JPL
23780	1998 QT_{10}	—	August 17, 1998	Socorro	LINEAR	EUN	3.4 km	MPC · JPL
23781	1998 QT_{11}	—	August 17, 1998	Socorro	LINEAR	·	7.8 km	MPC · JPL
23782	1998 QE_{12}	—	August 17, 1998	Socorro	LINEAR	CYB	17 km	MPC · JPL
23783 Alyssachan	1998 QG_{12}	Alyssachan	August 17, 1998	Socorro	LINEAR	V	2.8 km	MPC · JPL
23784	1998 QW_{15}	—	August 22, 1998	Bédoin	P. Antonini	·	6.2 km	MPC · JPL
23785	1998 QJ_{16}	—	August 17, 1998	Socorro	LINEAR	DOR	12 km	MPC · JPL
23786	1998 QK_{16}	—	August 17, 1998	Socorro	LINEAR	EUN	4.4 km	MPC · JPL
23787	1998 QC_{17}	—	August 17, 1998	Socorro	LINEAR	V	3.6 km	MPC · JPL
23788 Cofer	1998 QT_{18}	Cofer	August 17, 1998	Socorro	LINEAR	·	3.6 km	MPC · JPL
23789	1998 QW_{18}	—	August 17, 1998	Socorro	LINEAR	·	3.2 km	MPC · JPL
23790	1998 QK_{19}	—	August 17, 1998	Socorro	LINEAR	·	6.7 km	MPC · JPL
23791 Kaysonconlin	1998 QX_{21}	Kaysonconlin	August 17, 1998	Socorro	LINEAR	·	6.7 km	MPC · JPL
23792 Alyssacook	1998 QU_{24}	Alyssacook	August 17, 1998	Socorro	LINEAR	V	2.7 km	MPC · JPL
23793	1998 QK_{26}	—	August 23, 1998	Woomera	F. B. Zoltowski	THM	6.8 km	MPC · JPL
23794	1998 QG_{29}	—	August 22, 1998	Xinglong	SCAP	·	3.9 km	MPC · JPL
23795	1998 QW_{32}	—	August 17, 1998	Socorro	LINEAR	·	10 km	MPC · JPL
23796	1998 QK_{34}	—	August 17, 1998	Socorro	LINEAR	MAR	5.9 km	MPC · JPL
23797	1998 QR_{36}	—	August 17, 1998	Socorro	LINEAR	·	3.7 km	MPC · JPL
23798 Samagonzalez	1998 QL_{37}	Samagonzalez	August 17, 1998	Socorro	LINEAR	·	3.0 km	MPC · JPL
23799	1998 QZ_{37}	—	August 17, 1998	Socorro	LINEAR	EUN	3.2 km	MPC · JPL
23800	1998 QD_{38}	—	August 17, 1998	Socorro	LINEAR	·	4.6 km	MPC · JPL

== 23801–23900 ==
back to top

Designation			Discovery			Properties		Ref
Permanent	Provisional	Named after	Date	Site	Discoverer(s)	Category	Diam.	Ref
23801 Erikgustafson	1998 QQ_{38}	Erikgustafson	August 17, 1998	Socorro	LINEAR	·	4.2 km	MPC · JPL
23802	1998 QA_{39}	—	August 17, 1998	Socorro	LINEAR	EUN	4.9 km	MPC · JPL
23803	1998 QE_{39}	—	August 17, 1998	Socorro	LINEAR	THM	7.3 km	MPC · JPL
23804 Haber	1998 QR_{39}	Haber	August 17, 1998	Socorro	LINEAR	V · slow	2.3 km	MPC · JPL
23805	1998 QB_{40}	—	August 17, 1998	Socorro	LINEAR	GEF	4.1 km	MPC · JPL
23806	1998 QD_{40}	—	August 17, 1998	Socorro	LINEAR	HOF	7.7 km	MPC · JPL
23807	1998 QM_{40}	—	August 17, 1998	Socorro	LINEAR	ADE	9.9 km	MPC · JPL
23808 Joshuahammer	1998 QL_{42}	Joshuahammer	August 17, 1998	Socorro	LINEAR	KOR	3.5 km	MPC · JPL
23809 Haswell	1998 QC_{44}	Haswell	August 17, 1998	Socorro	LINEAR	·	4.9 km	MPC · JPL
23810	1998 QO_{45}	—	August 17, 1998	Socorro	LINEAR	PHO	4.1 km	MPC · JPL
23811 Connorivens	1998 QB_{46}	Connorivens	August 17, 1998	Socorro	LINEAR	·	4.2 km	MPC · JPL
23812 Jannuzi	1998 QR_{46}	Jannuzi	August 17, 1998	Socorro	LINEAR	NEM	5.4 km	MPC · JPL
23813	1998 QT_{46}	—	August 17, 1998	Socorro	LINEAR	·	10 km	MPC · JPL
23814 Bethanylynne	1998 QE_{49}	Bethanylynne	August 17, 1998	Socorro	LINEAR	·	5.0 km	MPC · JPL
23815	1998 QF_{49}	—	August 17, 1998	Socorro	LINEAR	·	4.6 km	MPC · JPL
23816 Rohitkamat	1998 QF_{50}	Rohitkamat	August 17, 1998	Socorro	LINEAR	·	4.2 km	MPC · JPL
23817 Gokulk	1998 QX_{50}	Gokulk	August 17, 1998	Socorro	LINEAR	·	5.1 km	MPC · JPL
23818 Matthewlepow	1998 QZ_{50}	Matthewlepow	August 17, 1998	Socorro	LINEAR	MRX	3.9 km	MPC · JPL
23819 Tsuyoshi	1998 QK_{54}	Tsuyoshi	August 27, 1998	Anderson Mesa	LONEOS	HOF ·	5.1 km	MPC · JPL
23820	1998 QT_{69}	—	August 24, 1998	Socorro	LINEAR	ADE ·	3.4 km	MPC · JPL
23821 Morganmonroe	1998 QZ_{69}	Morganmonroe	August 24, 1998	Socorro	LINEAR	EOS	5.3 km	MPC · JPL
23822	1998 QC_{70}	—	August 24, 1998	Socorro	LINEAR	EOS	5.9 km	MPC · JPL
23823	1998 QJ_{70}	—	August 24, 1998	Socorro	LINEAR	·	13 km	MPC · JPL
23824	1998 QX_{72}	—	August 24, 1998	Socorro	LINEAR	·	15 km	MPC · JPL
23825	1998 QD_{73}	—	August 24, 1998	Socorro	LINEAR	·	6.2 km	MPC · JPL
23826	1998 QO_{73}	—	August 24, 1998	Socorro	LINEAR	·	8.4 km	MPC · JPL
23827	1998 QG_{74}	—	August 24, 1998	Socorro	LINEAR	·	13 km	MPC · JPL
23828	1998 QK_{76}	—	August 24, 1998	Socorro	LINEAR	·	4.4 km	MPC · JPL
23829	1998 QR_{77}	—	August 24, 1998	Socorro	LINEAR	EUN	5.0 km	MPC · JPL
23830	1998 QZ_{85}	—	August 24, 1998	Socorro	LINEAR	PAL	9.2 km	MPC · JPL
23831 Mattmooney	1998 QK_{86}	Mattmooney	August 24, 1998	Socorro	LINEAR	EOS	6.3 km	MPC · JPL
23832	1998 QW_{89}	—	August 24, 1998	Socorro	LINEAR	·	3.4 km	MPC · JPL
23833 Mowers	1998 QS_{90}	Mowers	August 28, 1998	Socorro	LINEAR	·	3.1 km	MPC · JPL
23834 Mukhopadhyay	1998 QW_{90}	Mukhopadhyay	August 28, 1998	Socorro	LINEAR	NYS	3.4 km	MPC · JPL
23835	1998 QF_{91}	—	August 28, 1998	Socorro	LINEAR	EUN	4.6 km	MPC · JPL
23836	1998 QS_{93}	—	August 17, 1998	Socorro	LINEAR	·	3.5 km	MPC · JPL
23837 Matthewnanni	1998 QY_{93}	Matthewnanni	August 17, 1998	Socorro	LINEAR	NYS	2.8 km	MPC · JPL
23838	1998 QB_{96}	—	August 19, 1998	Socorro	LINEAR	·	5.0 km	MPC · JPL
23839	1998 QO_{100}	—	August 26, 1998	La Silla	E. W. Elst	·	4.5 km	MPC · JPL
23840	1998 QP_{100}	—	August 26, 1998	La Silla	E. W. Elst	HOF	8.8 km	MPC · JPL
23841	1998 QG_{102}	—	August 26, 1998	La Silla	E. W. Elst	·	5.4 km	MPC · JPL
23842	1998 QM_{106}	—	August 25, 1998	La Silla	E. W. Elst	·	4.1 km	MPC · JPL
23843	1998 QU_{106}	—	August 25, 1998	La Silla	E. W. Elst	·	5.4 km	MPC · JPL
23844 Raghvendra	1998 QB_{109}	Raghvendra	August 17, 1998	Socorro	LINEAR	·	2.7 km	MPC · JPL
23845	1998 RB	—	September 2, 1998	Dynic	A. Sugie	·	4.0 km	MPC · JPL
23846	1998 RF	—	September 1, 1998	Woomera	F. B. Zoltowski	·	5.7 km	MPC · JPL
23847	1998 RC_{1}	—	September 12, 1998	Oizumi	T. Kobayashi	EOS	6.2 km	MPC · JPL
23848	1998 RJ_{1}	—	September 10, 1998	Višnjan Observatory	Višnjan	(3460)	10 km	MPC · JPL
23849	1998 RA_{19}	—	September 14, 1998	Socorro	LINEAR	·	6.9 km	MPC · JPL
23850 Ramaswami	1998 RJ_{34}	Ramaswami	September 14, 1998	Socorro	LINEAR	·	3.8 km	MPC · JPL
23851 Rottman-Yang	1998 RZ_{34}	Rottman-Yang	September 14, 1998	Socorro	LINEAR	NYS	4.2 km	MPC · JPL
23852 Laurierumker	1998 RN_{35}	Laurierumker	September 14, 1998	Socorro	LINEAR	KOR	4.6 km	MPC · JPL
23853	1998 RZ_{35}	—	September 14, 1998	Socorro	LINEAR	EUN	5.6 km	MPC · JPL
23854 Rickschaffer	1998 RD_{40}	Rickschaffer	September 14, 1998	Socorro	LINEAR	·	5.2 km	MPC · JPL
23855 Brandonshih	1998 RD_{44}	Brandonshih	September 14, 1998	Socorro	LINEAR	·	6.8 km	MPC · JPL
23856	1998 RU_{47}	—	September 14, 1998	Socorro	LINEAR	·	11 km	MPC · JPL
23857	1998 RT_{50}	—	September 14, 1998	Socorro	LINEAR	·	7.5 km	MPC · JPL
23858 Ambrosesoehn	1998 RG_{53}	Ambrosesoehn	September 14, 1998	Socorro	LINEAR	·	4.2 km	MPC · JPL
23859	1998 RX_{55}	—	September 14, 1998	Socorro	LINEAR	·	7.4 km	MPC · JPL
23860	1998 RU_{56}	—	September 14, 1998	Socorro	LINEAR	·	3.5 km	MPC · JPL
23861 Benjaminsong	1998 RM_{58}	Benjaminsong	September 14, 1998	Socorro	LINEAR	KOR	3.7 km	MPC · JPL
23862	1998 RU_{59}	—	September 14, 1998	Socorro	LINEAR	·	4.8 km	MPC · JPL
23863	1998 RB_{62}	—	September 14, 1998	Socorro	LINEAR	EOS	6.4 km	MPC · JPL
23864	1998 RP_{64}	—	September 14, 1998	Socorro	LINEAR	·	14 km	MPC · JPL
23865 Karlsorensen	1998 RK_{65}	Karlsorensen	September 14, 1998	Socorro	LINEAR	·	5.9 km	MPC · JPL
23866	1998 RC_{69}	—	September 14, 1998	Socorro	LINEAR	THM	8.8 km	MPC · JPL
23867 Cathsoto	1998 RG_{71}	Cathsoto	September 14, 1998	Socorro	LINEAR	·	7.5 km	MPC · JPL
23868	1998 RA_{73}	—	September 14, 1998	Socorro	LINEAR	KOR	4.2 km	MPC · JPL
23869	1998 RF_{74}	—	September 14, 1998	Socorro	LINEAR	·	5.7 km	MPC · JPL
23870	1998 RW_{75}	—	September 14, 1998	Socorro	LINEAR	·	11 km	MPC · JPL
23871 Ousha	1998 RC_{76}	Ousha	September 14, 1998	Socorro	LINEAR	·	6.7 km	MPC · JPL
23872	1998 RH_{76}	—	September 14, 1998	Socorro	LINEAR	KOR	5.2 km	MPC · JPL
23873	1998 RL_{76}	—	September 14, 1998	Socorro	LINEAR	KOR	5.7 km	MPC · JPL
23874	1998 RB_{77}	—	September 14, 1998	Socorro	LINEAR	AGN	6.0 km	MPC · JPL
23875 Strube	1998 RC_{77}	Strube	September 14, 1998	Socorro	LINEAR	·	7.1 km	MPC · JPL
23876	1998 RZ_{79}	—	September 14, 1998	Socorro	LINEAR	AGN	6.2 km	MPC · JPL
23877 Gourmaud	1998 SP	Gourmaud	September 16, 1998	Caussols	ODAS	HYG	8.0 km	MPC · JPL
23878	1998 SN_{2}	—	September 18, 1998	Caussols	ODAS	THM	7.1 km	MPC · JPL
23879 Demura	1998 SX_{4}	Demura	September 17, 1998	Anderson Mesa	LONEOS	·	10 km	MPC · JPL
23880 Tongil	1998 SG_{5}	Tongil	September 18, 1998	Younchun	Lee, T. H.	EUN	7.8 km	MPC · JPL
23881	1998 SP_{7}	—	September 20, 1998	Kitt Peak	Spacewatch	·	4.9 km	MPC · JPL
23882 Fredcourant	1998 SC_{12}	Fredcourant	September 22, 1998	Caussols	ODAS	·	7.2 km	MPC · JPL
23883	1998 SL_{12}	—	September 21, 1998	Višnjan Observatory	Višnjan	KOR	5.4 km	MPC · JPL
23884 Karenharvey	1998 SY_{12}	Karenharvey	September 20, 1998	Goodricke-Pigott	R. A. Tucker	EUN	4.0 km	MPC · JPL
23885	1998 SE_{13}	—	September 16, 1998	Caussols	ODAS	·	3.7 km	MPC · JPL
23886 Toshihamane	1998 SV_{23}	Toshihamane	September 17, 1998	Anderson Mesa	LONEOS	·	7.5 km	MPC · JPL
23887 Shinsukeabe	1998 SA_{24}	Shinsukeabe	September 17, 1998	Anderson Mesa	LONEOS	·	4.5 km	MPC · JPL
23888 Daikinoshita	1998 SZ_{24}	Daikinoshita	September 18, 1998	Anderson Mesa	LONEOS	·	4.0 km	MPC · JPL
23889 Hermanngrassmann	1998 SC_{28}	Hermanngrassmann	September 26, 1998	Prescott	P. G. Comba	THM	6.4 km	MPC · JPL
23890 Quindou	1998 SO_{35}	Quindou	September 22, 1998	Caussols	ODAS	·	2.9 km	MPC · JPL
23891	1998 SC_{49}	—	September 23, 1998	Višnjan Observatory	Višnjan	KOR	3.7 km	MPC · JPL
23892	1998 SH_{49}	—	September 23, 1998	Uccle	T. Pauwels	EUN	4.2 km	MPC · JPL
23893 Lauman	1998 SL_{54}	Lauman	September 16, 1998	Anderson Mesa	LONEOS	NYS	8.3 km	MPC · JPL
23894 Arikahiguchi	1998 SM_{56}	Arikahiguchi	September 16, 1998	Anderson Mesa	LONEOS	·	5.3 km	MPC · JPL
23895 Akikonakamura	1998 SH_{58}	Akikonakamura	September 17, 1998	Anderson Mesa	LONEOS	·	5.0 km	MPC · JPL
23896 Tatsuaki	1998 SF_{59}	Tatsuaki	September 17, 1998	Anderson Mesa	LONEOS	EOS	7.1 km	MPC · JPL
23897 Daikuroda	1998 SA_{60}	Daikuroda	September 17, 1998	Anderson Mesa	LONEOS	·	4.5 km	MPC · JPL
23898 Takir	1998 SG_{60}	Takir	September 17, 1998	Anderson Mesa	LONEOS	THM	14 km	MPC · JPL
23899 Kornoš	1998 SE_{61}	Kornoš	September 17, 1998	Anderson Mesa	LONEOS	·	5.7 km	MPC · JPL
23900 Urakawa	1998 SO_{61}	Urakawa	September 17, 1998	Anderson Mesa	LONEOS	HOF	11 km	MPC · JPL

== 23901–24000 ==
back to top

Designation			Discovery			Properties		Ref
Permanent	Provisional	Named after	Date	Site	Discoverer(s)	Category	Diam.	Ref
23901	1998 SU_{62}	—	September 25, 1998	Xinglong	SCAP	·	4.0 km	MPC · JPL
23902	1998 SN_{64}	—	September 20, 1998	La Silla	E. W. Elst	·	4.4 km	MPC · JPL
23903	1998 SK_{65}	—	September 20, 1998	La Silla	E. W. Elst	·	6.6 km	MPC · JPL
23904 Amytang	1998 SE_{70}	Amytang	September 21, 1998	Socorro	LINEAR	·	2.8 km	MPC · JPL
23905	1998 SQ_{70}	—	September 21, 1998	La Silla	E. W. Elst	·	4.1 km	MPC · JPL
23906	1998 SB_{72}	—	September 21, 1998	La Silla	E. W. Elst	THM	8.8 km	MPC · JPL
23907	1998 SH_{72}	—	September 21, 1998	La Silla	E. W. Elst	NYS	4.4 km	MPC · JPL
23908	1998 SL_{80}	—	September 26, 1998	Socorro	LINEAR	PHO	4.0 km	MPC · JPL
23909	1998 SZ_{96}	—	September 26, 1998	Socorro	LINEAR	MAR	4.4 km	MPC · JPL
23910	1998 SP_{115}	—	September 26, 1998	Socorro	LINEAR	·	8.3 km	MPC · JPL
23911	1998 SF_{128}	—	September 26, 1998	Socorro	LINEAR	·	10 km	MPC · JPL
23912	1998 SU_{128}	—	September 26, 1998	Socorro	LINEAR	KOR	4.9 km	MPC · JPL
23913	1998 SB_{129}	—	September 26, 1998	Socorro	LINEAR	V	2.9 km	MPC · JPL
23914	1998 SO_{129}	—	September 26, 1998	Socorro	LINEAR	KOR	6.3 km	MPC · JPL
23915	1998 SN_{130}	—	September 26, 1998	Socorro	LINEAR	·	8.9 km	MPC · JPL
23916	1998 SD_{131}	—	September 26, 1998	Socorro	LINEAR	HYG	10 km	MPC · JPL
23917	1998 SV_{132}	—	September 26, 1998	Socorro	LINEAR	·	6.6 km	MPC · JPL
23918	1998 SH_{133}	—	September 26, 1998	Socorro	LINEAR	·	16 km	MPC · JPL
23919	1998 SV_{134}	—	September 26, 1998	Socorro	LINEAR	·	8.9 km	MPC · JPL
23920	1998 SE_{135}	—	September 26, 1998	Socorro	LINEAR	·	9.9 km	MPC · JPL
23921	1998 SH_{135}	—	September 26, 1998	Socorro	LINEAR	(21885)	12 km	MPC · JPL
23922 Tawadros	1998 SR_{135}	Tawadros	September 26, 1998	Socorro	LINEAR	·	9.9 km	MPC · JPL
23923	1998 SA_{137}	—	September 26, 1998	Socorro	LINEAR	·	7.8 km	MPC · JPL
23924 Premt	1998 SX_{140}	Premt	September 26, 1998	Socorro	LINEAR	NYS	5.1 km	MPC · JPL
23925	1998 SZ_{140}	—	September 26, 1998	Socorro	LINEAR	KOR	5.0 km	MPC · JPL
23926	1998 SU_{141}	—	September 26, 1998	Socorro	LINEAR	·	4.2 km	MPC · JPL
23927	1998 SS_{144}	—	September 20, 1998	La Silla	E. W. Elst	·	5.9 km	MPC · JPL
23928 Darbywoodard	1998 ST_{160}	Darbywoodard	September 26, 1998	Socorro	LINEAR	·	4.8 km	MPC · JPL
23929	1998 SU_{163}	—	September 18, 1998	La Silla	E. W. Elst	·	5.9 km	MPC · JPL
23930	1998 SX_{163}	—	September 18, 1998	La Silla	E. W. Elst	EOS	7.5 km	MPC · JPL
23931 Ibuki	1998 SV_{164}	Ibuki	September 21, 1998	Anderson Mesa	LONEOS	·	8.0 km	MPC · JPL
23932	1998 TN_{2}	—	October 13, 1998	Caussols	ODAS	·	3.3 km	MPC · JPL
23933	1998 TD_{3}	—	October 14, 1998	Catalina	CSS	·	9.9 km	MPC · JPL
23934	1998 TN_{5}	—	October 13, 1998	Višnjan Observatory	K. Korlević	(5651)	15 km	MPC · JPL
23935	1998 TU_{6}	—	October 13, 1998	Višnjan Observatory	K. Korlević	·	4.4 km	MPC · JPL
23936	1998 TV_{6}	—	October 13, 1998	Višnjan Observatory	K. Korlević	URS	10 km	MPC · JPL
23937 Delibes	1998 TR_{15}	Delibes	October 15, 1998	Caussols	ODAS	·	1.9 km	MPC · JPL
23938 Kurosaki	1998 TR_{33}	Kurosaki	October 14, 1998	Anderson Mesa	LONEOS	·	6.5 km	MPC · JPL
23939	1998 TV_{33}	—	October 14, 1998	Anderson Mesa	LONEOS	L4	24 km	MPC · JPL
23940	1998 UE	—	October 16, 1998	Catalina	CSS	PHO	4.3 km	MPC · JPL
23941	1998 UW_{1}	—	October 16, 1998	Višnjan Observatory	K. Korlević	EUN	7.2 km	MPC · JPL
23942	1998 UX_{1}	—	October 16, 1998	Višnjan Observatory	K. Korlević	EOS	7.6 km	MPC · JPL
23943	1998 UO_{2}	—	October 20, 1998	Caussols	ODAS	·	3.7 km	MPC · JPL
23944 Dusser	1998 UR_{3}	Dusser	October 20, 1998	Caussols	ODAS	·	4.5 km	MPC · JPL
23945	1998 US_{4}	—	October 20, 1998	Caussols	ODAS	·	11 km	MPC · JPL
23946 Marcelleroux	1998 UL_{6}	Marcelleroux	October 22, 1998	Caussols	ODAS	EOS	9.0 km	MPC · JPL
23947	1998 UH_{16}	—	October 23, 1998	Caussols	ODAS	L4	19 km	MPC · JPL
23948	1998 UQ_{18}	—	October 25, 1998	Oizumi	T. Kobayashi	EOS	9.6 km	MPC · JPL
23949 Dazapata	1998 UP_{21}	Dazapata	October 28, 1998	Socorro	LINEAR	·	4.9 km	MPC · JPL
23950 Tsusakamoto	1998 UM_{24}	Tsusakamoto	October 18, 1998	Anderson Mesa	LONEOS	·	3.5 km	MPC · JPL
23951	1998 UX_{25}	—	October 18, 1998	La Silla	E. W. Elst	·	10 km	MPC · JPL
23952	1998 UU_{28}	—	October 18, 1998	La Silla	E. W. Elst	EOS	8.2 km	MPC · JPL
23953	1998 UV_{30}	—	October 18, 1998	La Silla	E. W. Elst	·	8.7 km	MPC · JPL
23954	1998 UT_{35}	—	October 28, 1998	Socorro	LINEAR	EOS	6.3 km	MPC · JPL
23955 Nishikota	1998 UO_{44}	Nishikota	October 18, 1998	Anderson Mesa	LONEOS	·	5.6 km	MPC · JPL
23956	1998 VD_{9}	—	November 10, 1998	Socorro	LINEAR	slow	13 km	MPC · JPL
23957	1998 VL_{16}	—	November 10, 1998	Socorro	LINEAR	·	5.5 km	MPC · JPL
23958 Theronice	1998 VD_{30}	Theronice	November 10, 1998	Socorro	LINEAR	L4 · slow	46 km	MPC · JPL
23959	1998 VZ_{36}	—	November 10, 1998	Socorro	LINEAR	EUN	6.7 km	MPC · JPL
23960	1998 VL_{37}	—	November 10, 1998	Socorro	LINEAR	EUN	4.7 km	MPC · JPL
23961	1998 VL_{39}	—	November 11, 1998	Socorro	LINEAR	·	10 km	MPC · JPL
23962	1998 WO_{1}	—	November 18, 1998	Oizumi	T. Kobayashi	THM	10 km	MPC · JPL
23963	1998 WY_{8}	—	November 18, 1998	Chichibu	N. Satō	L4	20 km	MPC · JPL
23964	1998 WR_{15}	—	November 21, 1998	Socorro	LINEAR	·	9.2 km	MPC · JPL
23965	1998 WP_{16}	—	November 21, 1998	Socorro	LINEAR	EOS	6.8 km	MPC · JPL
23966	1998 WO_{22}	—	November 18, 1998	Socorro	LINEAR	(5)	4.4 km	MPC · JPL
23967	1998 XQ_{12}	—	December 14, 1998	Višnjan Observatory	K. Korlević	·	10 km	MPC · JPL
23968	1998 XA_{13}	—	December 8, 1998	Caussols	ODAS	L4	31 km	MPC · JPL
23969	1998 XF_{78}	—	December 15, 1998	Socorro	LINEAR	·	12 km	MPC · JPL
23970	1998 YP_{6}	—	December 21, 1998	Caussols	ODAS	L4	32 km	MPC · JPL
23971	1998 YU_{9}	—	December 25, 1998	Višnjan Observatory	K. Korlević, M. Jurić	PHO	8.3 km	MPC · JPL
23972	1999 AA	—	January 3, 1999	Oizumi	T. Kobayashi	EOS	8.3 km	MPC · JPL
23973	1999 CA_{4}	—	February 5, 1999	Xinglong	SCAP	EOS	11 km	MPC · JPL
23974	1999 CK_{12}	—	February 12, 1999	Socorro	LINEAR	H	2.0 km	MPC · JPL
23975 Akran	1999 CU_{81}	Akran	February 12, 1999	Socorro	LINEAR	·	4.2 km	MPC · JPL
23976	1999 DZ_{6}	—	February 23, 1999	Socorro	LINEAR	EUN	3.7 km	MPC · JPL
23977	1999 GW_{6}	—	April 14, 1999	Socorro	LINEAR	·	16 km	MPC · JPL
23978	1999 JF_{21}	—	May 10, 1999	Socorro	LINEAR	·	6.3 km	MPC · JPL
23979	1999 JL_{82}	—	May 12, 1999	Socorro	LINEAR	EUN	4.9 km	MPC · JPL
23980 Ogden	1999 JA_{124}	Ogden	May 14, 1999	Socorro	LINEAR	V	3.2 km	MPC · JPL
23981 Patjohnson	1999 LC_{4}	Patjohnson	June 9, 1999	Socorro	LINEAR	slow	2.5 km	MPC · JPL
23982	1999 LM_{12}	—	June 9, 1999	Socorro	LINEAR	·	6.5 km	MPC · JPL
23983	1999 NS_{11}	—	July 13, 1999	Socorro	LINEAR	·	2.6 km	MPC · JPL
23984	1999 NC_{42}	—	July 14, 1999	Socorro	LINEAR	EUN	4.1 km	MPC · JPL
23985	1999 NB_{53}	—	July 12, 1999	Socorro	LINEAR	EUN	5.8 km	MPC · JPL
23986	1999 NZ_{53}	—	July 12, 1999	Socorro	LINEAR	TIR	5.2 km	MPC · JPL
23987	1999 NB_{63}	—	July 13, 1999	Socorro	LINEAR	L5	21 km	MPC · JPL
23988 Maungakiekie	1999 RB	Maungakiekie	September 2, 1999	Auckland	I. P. Griffin	·	8.5 km	MPC · JPL
23989 Farpoint	1999 RF	Farpoint	September 3, 1999	Farpoint	G. Hug, G. Bell	·	3.5 km	MPC · JPL
23990 Springsteen	1999 RM_{1}	Springsteen	September 4, 1999	Auckland	I. P. Griffin	·	1.6 km	MPC · JPL
23991	1999 RD_{3}	—	September 6, 1999	Višnjan Observatory	K. Korlević	·	4.1 km	MPC · JPL
23992 Markhobbs	1999 RO_{11}	Markhobbs	September 7, 1999	Socorro	LINEAR	·	2.6 km	MPC · JPL
23993	1999 RS_{13}	—	September 7, 1999	Socorro	LINEAR	EUN	4.2 km	MPC · JPL
23994 Mayhan	1999 RA_{14}	Mayhan	September 7, 1999	Socorro	LINEAR	NYS	3.1 km	MPC · JPL
23995 Oechsle	1999 RX_{17}	Oechsle	September 7, 1999	Socorro	LINEAR	NYS	1.8 km	MPC · JPL
23996	1999 RT_{27}	—	September 8, 1999	Višnjan Observatory	K. Korlević	·	2.7 km	MPC · JPL
23997	1999 RW_{27}	—	September 8, 1999	Višnjan Observatory	K. Korlević	·	7.0 km	MPC · JPL
23998	1999 RP_{29}	—	September 8, 1999	Socorro	LINEAR	H	1.6 km	MPC · JPL
23999 Rinner	1999 RA_{33}	Rinner	September 9, 1999	Saint-Michel-sur-Meurthe	L. Bernasconi	·	5.2 km	MPC · JPL
24000 Patrickdufour	1999 RB_{33}	Patrickdufour	September 10, 1999	Saint-Michel-sur-Meurthe	L. Bernasconi	·	2.2 km	MPC · JPL

back to top

== See also ==
- Meanings of minor-planet names: 23001–24000
