= 23712 Willpatrick =

Main-belt asteroid

Discovery
- Discovered by: W. G. Dillon; E. R. Dillon
- Discovery site: George Obs. (735)
- Discovery date: 1 January 1998

Designations
- Named after: William Patrick Dillon (discoverer's son)
- Alternative designations: 1998 AA
- Minor planet category: main-belt · Phocaea

Orbital characteristics
- Epoch 4 September 2017 (JD 2458000.5)
- Uncertainty parameter 0
- Observation arc: 63.21 yr (23,086 days)
- Aphelion: 2.9614 AU
- Perihelion: 1.7890 AU
- Semi-major axis: 2.3752 AU
- Eccentricity: 0.2468
- Orbital period (sidereal): 3.66 yr (1,337 days)
- Mean anomaly: 215.74°
- Mean motion: 0° 16^{m} 9.48^{s} / day
- Inclination: 23.493°
- Longitude of ascending node: 246.42°
- Argument of perihelion: 85.255°

Physical characteristics
- Dimensions: 3.47±0.45 km 5.28 km (calculated); 7.660±0.187 km
- Synodic rotation period: 3.902±0.005 h (Note: Lightcurve plot of 23712 Willpatrick, Palmer Divide Observatory, B. D. Warner (2004) rotation period of 3.902±0.005 hours with a brightness amplitude of 0.40±0.02 magnitude.)
- Geometric albedo: 0.1198±0.0272; 0.120±0.027; 0.23 (assumed); 0.44±0.13
- Spectral type: S
- Absolute magnitude (H): 13.6 · 13.5 · 13.85±0.23 · 13.97

23712 Willpatrick (provisional designation 1998 AA) is a stony Phocaea asteroid from the inner regions of the asteroid belt, approximately 5 kilometers in diameter.

The asteroid was discovered on 1 January 1998, by American astronomers Elizabeth and William G. Dillon at George Observatory in Needville, Texas, who later named it after their son William Patrick Dillon.

== Orbit and classification ==
Willpatrick is a member of the Phocaea family (701), a group of stony asteroids with similar orbital characteristics. It orbits the Sun in the inner main-belt at a distance of 1.8–3.0 AU once every 3 years and 8 months (1,337 days). Its orbit has an eccentricity of 0.25 and an inclination of 23° with respect to the ecliptic.

The first precovery was taken during the Digitized Sky Survey at Palomar Observatory in January 1954, extending the asteroid's observation arc by 44 years prior to its official discovery observation at Needville.

== Physical characteristics ==
=== Lightcurve ===
In September 2004, a rotational lightcurve of Willpatrick was obtained by American astronomer Brian Warner at his Palmer Divide Observatory (716) in Colorado. The photometric observations rendered a well-defined rotation period of 3.902 hours with a brightness variation of 0.40 magnitude (U=3).

=== Diameter and albedo ===
According to the survey carried out by the NEOWISE mission of NASA's Wide-field Infrared Survey Explorer, Willpatrick measures between 3.47 and 7.7 kilometers in diameter and its surface has an albedo between 0.12 and 0.44.

The Collaborative Asteroid Lightcurve Link assumes a family-specific albedo of 0.23 – derived from 25 Phocaea, the namesake of the Phocaea family – and calculates a diameter of 5.3 kilometers with an absolute magnitude of 13.6.

== Naming ==
This minor planet was named after the discoverer's son, William Patrick Dillon (born 1992), who was present on the night this minor planet was discovered. His words "Daddy, I want to go home now. This place is cold and spooky." made it into the naming citation of the Minor Planet Circulars (MPCs). The approved naming citation was published by the Minor Planet Center on 28 September 2004 (M.P.C. 52769).
