= 23131 Debenedictis =

Asteroid

Discovery
- Discovered by: LINEAR
- Discovery site: Lincoln Lab ETS
- Discovery date: 5 January 2000

Designations
- Named after: Erika Alden DeBenedictis (ISEF awardee)
- Alternative designations: 2000 AS_{128} · 1955 SF_{2} 1955 UE · 1997 EY_{49} 1998 MM_{31}
- Minor planet category: main-belt · (inner) background

Orbital characteristics
- Epoch 4 September 2017 (JD 2458000.5)
- Uncertainty parameter 0
- Observation arc: 61.52 yr (22,470 days)
- Aphelion: 2.6138 AU
- Perihelion: 1.8541 AU
- Semi-major axis: 2.2339 AU
- Eccentricity: 0.1700
- Orbital period (sidereal): 3.34 yr (1,220 days)
- Mean anomaly: 180.07°
- Mean motion: 0° 17^{m} 42.72^{s} / day
- Inclination: 2.1981°
- Longitude of ascending node: 285.53°
- Argument of perihelion: 111.40°

Physical characteristics
- Mean diameter: 3.853±0.093 km
- Geometric albedo: 0.249±0.041
- Absolute magnitude (H): 14.4

23131 Debenedictis (provisional designation 2000 AS_{128}) is a bright background asteroid from the inner region of the asteroid belt, approximately 4 kilometers in diameter. It was discovered on 5 January 2000, by astronomers of the LINEAR program at the Lincoln Laboratory's Experimental Test Site near Socorro, New Mexico, United States. The asteroid was named for 2007-ISEF awardee Erika Alden DeBenedictis.

== Orbit and classification ==
Debenedictis is a non-family from the main belt's background population. It orbits the Sun in the inner asteroid belt at a distance of 1.9–2.6 AU once every 3 years and 4 months (1,220 days; semi-major axis of 2.23 AU). Its orbit has an eccentricity of 0.17 and an inclination of 2° with respect to the ecliptic.

The body's observation arc begins with its first observations as 1955 SF_{2} at Heidelberg Observatory in September 1955, or more than 44 years prior to its official discovery observation at Socorro.

== Physical characteristics ==
Based on the asteroid's geometric albedo of 0.249, it is possibly a stony S-type asteroid.

=== Rotation period ===
As of 2018, no rotational lightcurve of Debenedictis has been obtained from photometric observations. The body's rotation period, pole and shape remain unknown.

=== Diameter and albedo ===
According to the survey carried out by the NEOWISE mission of NASA's Wide-field Infrared Survey Explorer, Debenedictis measures 3.853 kilometers in diameter and its surface has an albedo of 0.249.

== Naming ==
This minor planet was named after American 2007-ISEF awardee Erika Alden DeBenedictis (born 1992) for her computer science project. She attended the Saint Pius X High School, Albuquerque, New Mexico, United States. The official naming citation was published by the Minor Planet Center on 28 August 2007 (M.P.C. 60501).

In 2008, she further became connected to asteroids when she attended the Summer Science Program, which teaches astronomy through a curriculum based on asteroid observations and orbital calculations. At the program in Socorro, New Mexico, just a short distance from where the asteroid was discovered, she had the opportunity to observe her namesake.

She became a research assistant at MIT, where she contributed to a number of papers including Daisy-chain gene drives for the alteration of local populations. As of 2025 she runs the Biodesign Laboratory at the Francis Crick Institute.
