= 23327 Luchernandez =

Main-belt asteroid

Discovery
- Discovered by: LINEAR
- Discovery site: Lincoln Lab ETS
- Discovery date: 20 January 2001

Designations
- Named after: Lucero Hernandez (2007 ISEF awardee)
- Alternative designations: 2001 BE_{31} · 1992 SE_{27} 1999 RZ_{63}
- Minor planet category: main-belt · (inner); Flora

Orbital characteristics
- Epoch 4 September 2017 (JD 2458000.5)
- Uncertainty parameter 0
- Observation arc: 25.22 yr (9,213 days)
- Aphelion: 2.5960 AU
- Perihelion: 2.0771 AU
- Semi-major axis: 2.3366 AU
- Eccentricity: 0.1110
- Orbital period (sidereal): 3.57 yr (1,305 days)
- Mean anomaly: 256.53°
- Mean motion: 0° 16^{m} 33.6^{s} / day
- Inclination: 5.7545°
- Longitude of ascending node: 146.36°
- Argument of perihelion: 320.17°

Physical characteristics
- Dimensions: 2.26 km (calculated); 2.475±0.509 km
- Synodic rotation period: 4.933±0.007 h
- Geometric albedo: 0.2399±0.1204; 0.24 (assumed)
- Spectral type: S (assumed)
- Absolute magnitude (H): 15.2 · 15.4 · 15.57±0.28

23327 Luchernandez (provisional designation 2001 BE_{31}) is a Florian asteroid from the inner regions of the asteroid belt, approximately 2 kilometers in diameter. It was discovered on 20 January 2001, by astronomers of the LINEAR program at the Lincoln Laboratory's Experimental Test Site near Socorro, New Mexico, United States. The asteroid was named for ISEF awardee Lucero Hernandez.

== Orbit and classification ==
Luchernandez is a member of the Flora family (402), a giant asteroid family and the largest family of stony asteroids in the main-belt. It orbits the Sun in the inner asteroid belt at a distance of 2.1–2.6 AU once every 3 years and 7 months (1,305 days; semi-major axis of 2.34 AU). Its orbit has an eccentricity of 0.11 and an inclination of 6° for the ecliptic.

The body's observation arc begins with a precovery published by the Digitized Sky Survey that was taken at Palomar Observatory in August 1992, more than 18 years before its official discovery observation at Socorro.

== Physical characteristics ==
Luchernandez is an assumed S-type asteroid, which agrees with the overall spectral type for members of the Flora family.

=== Rotation period ===
In December 2007, a rotational lightcurve of Luchernandez was obtained from photometric observations by Slovak astronomers Adrián Galád and Leonard Kornoš at the Modra Observatory. Lightcurve analysis gave a rotation period of 4.933 hours with a brightness variation of 0.50 magnitude (U=2+). A high brightness amplitude is indicative of an elongated, non-spherical shape. Alternative period solutions that give 5.49 hours or longer are less likely.

=== Diameter and albedo ===
According to the survey carried out by the NEOWISE mission of NASA's Wide-field Infrared Survey Explorer, Luchernandez measures 2.475 kilometers in diameter and its surface has an albedo of 0.2399.

The Collaborative Asteroid Lightcurve Link assumes an identical albedo of 0.24 – derived from 8 Flora, the family's parent body – and calculates a diameter of 2.26 kilometers based on an absolute magnitude of 15.4.

== Naming ==
This minor planet was named after Mexican student Lucero Hernandez (born 1989), who won second place in the 2007 Intel International Science and Engineering Fair for her computer science team project. The official naming citation was published by the Minor Planet Center on 28 August 2007 (M.P.C. 60505).
