= Grande Médaille d'Or des Explorations =

French geography award

The Grande Médaille d'Or des Explorations et Voyages de Découverte (French pronunciation: [ɡʁɑ̃d medaj dɔʁ dez‿ɛksplɔʁasjɔ̃ e vwajaʒ də dekuvɛʁt], "Great Gold Medal of Exploration and Journeys of Discovery") has been awarded since 1829 by the Société de Géographie of France for journeys whose outcomes have enhanced geographical knowledge.

== Recipients ==
Year	Recipient	Reason
1829	Captain John Franklin	for his voyage to the North Polar region
1830	René Caillié and Major Alexander Gordon Laing	for their journey to Timbuktu
1832	Jean Baptiste Douville	for his journey to the Congo and in equatorial Africa
1834	Captain John Ross	for his voyages in the Polar seas
1835	Alcide d'Orbigny	for his journeys in southern America
1836	Captain Camille Callier	for his journeys in the Orient (Middle East)
1837	Captain George Back	for his voyages in the Arctic region
1838	Frédéric DuBois de Montperreux	for his journey in the Caucasus region
1841	Rear-admiral Dumont d'Urville	for his voyage to the South Pole and Oceania
1843	James Clark Ross	for his discoveries in the Antarctic seas
1844	Xavier Hommaire de Hell	for his voyage on the Caspian Sea
1844	Joseph-Pons d'Arnaud	for his journey towards the source of the White Nile
1845	Claude Gay	for his journey to Chile
1845	Pierre Victor Ferret and Joseph Galinier	for their journey in Abyssinia
1846	Charles Tilstone Beke and Théophile Lefebvre	for their journey in Abyssinia (medal returned by Beke)
1847	Ludwig Leichhardt	for his journey in Australia
1847	Rochet d'Héricourt	for his journey in Choa
1850	Antoine and Arnaud-Michel d'Abbadie	for their journey in Abyssinia
1855	Captain Robert McClure	for discovering the North-west Passage
1856	Henry Barth	for his journey to Timbuktu
1857	David Livingstone	for his journeys across southern Africa
1858	Elisha Kent Kane	for his journey to the Arctic regions
1859	Hermann, Robert and Adolf von Schlagintweit	for their explorations in Tibet and Turkestan
1860	Richard Francis Burton and John Hanning Speke	for their exploration of the great lakes of east Africa
1861	Nicolas de Khanikof	for his exploration of the Khorassan
1864	Henri Duveyrier	for his exploration of the Algerian Sahara and the country of the Touareg
1867	Sir Samuel White Baker	for his journey in equatorial Africa
1869	Ernest Doudart de Lagrée and Francis Garnier	for their exploration of Indo-China
1872	Alfred Grandidier	for his exploration of Madagascar
1876	Gustav Nachtigal	for his journey across central Africa
1877	Verney Lovett Cameron	for his journey across equatorial Africa
1878	Henry Morton Stanley	for his journey across equatorial Africa
1879	Pierre Savorgnan de Brazza	for his exploration of the Upper Ogoue
1880	Adolf Nordenskjold	the Northwest Passage
1881	Major Alexandre de Serpa Pinto	for his journey across Africa
1884	Alphonse Milne-Edwards	for underwater surveying and dredging from the ships Travailleur and Talisman
1886	Hermenegildo de Brito Capelo	for his journey across southern Africa
1890	Captain Louis Gustave Binger	for his journey of exploration from the Upper Niger to the Gulf of Guinea
1891	Gabriel Bonvalot	for his journey from Siberia to Tonkin via Tibet
1893	Parfait-Louis Monteil	for his journey from Senegal to Tripoli via Chad
1896	Prince Henri of Orléans	for his journey from the Gulf of Tonkin to the Gulf of Bombay, 1895
1897	Fridtjof Nansen	for his crossing of the Arctic Sea, 1893–1896
1898	Édouard Foà	for his crossing of equatorial Africa, 1894–1897
1899	Emile Gentil	for exploration in Africa, from the Congo to Chad, 1895–1898
1900	Jean-Baptiste Marchand	for the Congo-Nile expedition, 1896–1899
1901	Fernand Foureau	for the (Foureau-Lamy) trans-Sahara expedition, 1898–1900
1902	Captain Paul Joalland	for the (Joalland-Meynier) expedition to central Africa, 1899–1901
1903	Auguste Pavie	for his exploration of Indo-China, 1879–1895
1904	Sven Hedin	for his explorations in central Asia, 1894–1902
1907	Colonel Robert Emile Bourgeois	for his geodesic expedition at the Equator
1910	Sir Ernest Shackleton	for exploration of Antarctica
1912	Jean-Baptiste Charcot	for his Antarctic expeditions
1913	Raoul Amundsen	for the discovery of the South Pole
1914	Admiral Robert E. Peary	for the discovery of the North Pole
1918	Jean Tilho	for the expedition to central Africa
1922	Charles Howard-Bury	for the Everest Expedition of 1921
1922	Charles Granville Bruce	for the Everest Expedition of 1922
1923	Sir Aurel Stein	for explorations in central Asia
1923	Rosita Forbes	for her exploration of the Kufra oasis
1924	Ole Olufsen	for his journey to the French Sahara
1924	Bruneau de Laborie	for the journey from Cameroon to Cairo via Lake Tchad and the Libyan Desert
1925	Baron Adrien de Guerlache de Gomery	for the Belgian Antarctic Expedition 1897–1899 and 1905: 07–09
1927	Charles Lindbergh	for the first crossing of the Atlantic by aeroplane
1928	Jacques de Rohan-Chabot	for exploration in Angola
1929	Ahmed Hassanein and Prince Kamal el Dine Hussein	for their exploration of the eastern Sahara
1932	Wickliffe Preston Draper	for the Augiéras-Draper Expedition (Southern Sahara), 1927–1928
1933	Georges-Marie Haardt and Louis Audouin-Dubreuil	for the Citroën Expedition to Central Asia, 1931–1932
1939	Alexander Hamilton Rice	for his exploration of the Amazon Basin
1950	French expedition to the Himalayas and Maurice Herzog	for the first ascent of Annapurna
1952	Théodore Monod	for expeditions and studies in Africa
1953	Augustin Lombard	for his study trip up Mount Everest
1954	Georges Houot and Pierre Willm	for the first dive into the deep ocean in a Bathyscaphe
1955	John Hunt, Baron Hunt, Sir Edmund Hillary and Sherpa Tenzing Norgay	for the first ascent of Mount Everest
1957	Henri Lhote	for his travel and archaeological work in the Sahara
1958	Vivian Fuchs	for the first transantarctic expedition and complete crossing of the continent
1970	Neil Armstrong, Edwin Aldrin and Michael Collins	for the first landing on the Moon
1977	Germaine Dieterlen	for Ethnology, especially the black civilisations (Dogon, Molinké and Bambara)
1979	Norbert Casteret	for Speleology
1991	Jean-Louis Étienne	for his transantarctic expedition
1998	Patrice Franceschi	for his New Guinea expedition
1999	Georges Pernoud	for his television series Thalassa
2001	Yann Arthus-Bertrand	for the sum of his photographic work
2002	Jean-Yves Empereur	for his archaeological discoveries in Egypt, notably in the port of Alexandria (underwater archaeology)
2003	Nicolas Hulot	for his expeditions, his television programs and his works
2004	Gilles Elkaim	for his Arctic expedition of 2000–2004
2005	Jean-Marc Pineau	for having retraced on foot the journey of René Caillié and his account of the journey Sur les pas de René Caillié
2006	Érik Orsenna	for the sum of his work, Salut au Grand Sud and Voyages aux Pays du Coton
2007	Jean Raspail	for the sum of his work

== See also ==
- List of geography awards
