= Pernoud =

Pernoud is a French surname. Notable people with the surname include:

- Georges Pernoud (1947–2021), French journalist and television presenter;
- Régine Pernoud (1909–1998), French historian and medievalist.
