= Maynard Owen Williams =

American journalist and photographer (1888–1963)

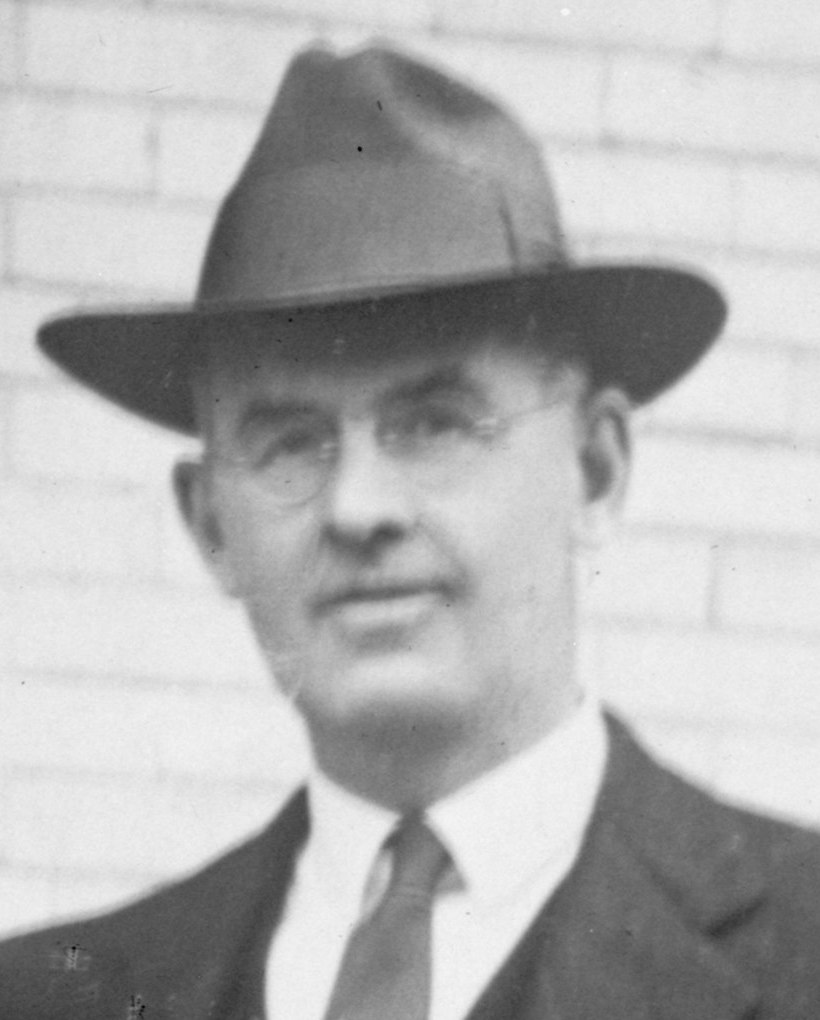
- Williams in 1930
- Born: September 12, 1888; Montour Falls, New York, U.S.
- Died: June 25, 1963 (aged 74); Antalya, Turkey
- Resting place: Feriköy Protestant Cemetery, Istanbul
- Education: Kalamazoo College (1910)
- Occupations: Journalist, photographer
- Employer: National Geographic Society (1919–1953)
- Known for: First foreign correspondent of National Geographic

Maynard Owen Williams (September 12, 1888 – June 25, 1963) was an American journalist and photographer. In 1919 he became the first foreign correspondent of the National Geographic Society, and he later headed its foreign editorial staff. Over a career of more than three decades he reported from Asia, the Middle East, Europe and the Arctic, witnessed the Russian Revolution and the opening of Tutankhamun's tomb, and served as photographer on the Croisière Jaune across Asia. He died in Antalya, Turkey, in 1963 and is buried in the American section of the Feriköy Protestant Cemetery in Istanbul.

== Early life and education ==
Williams was born in Montour Falls, New York, the son of George Abner Williams and Florence Owens Williams. He graduated from Kalamazoo College in Michigan in 1910.

== Teaching in Beirut and China ==
After graduating, Williams taught at the Syrian Protestant College in Beirut, which later became the American University of Beirut. He then went to China as a Baptist missionary teacher at Wayland Academy in Hangchow.

== Russia, 1917 ==
In the autumn of 1917, as the Russian Empire was collapsing, Williams travelled through its southern regions and across the Caucasus on his way to Central Asia. He described the peoples of the region in "Russia's Orphan Races", published in National Geographic in October 1918.

== National Geographic ==
The National Geographic Society hired Williams in 1919 as its first foreign correspondent. He later became the first chief of the magazine's foreign editorial staff, and over his career he wrote and photographed about a hundred stories for it. He called himself a "camera-coolie and a roughneck", and he is regarded as one of the pioneers of travel photography.

In 1923 he was present at the public opening of Tutankhamun's tomb in the Kingdom of Egypt. In 1925 he went to the Arctic with the Donald MacMillan expedition, on which Richard E. Byrd also served.

In 1931 and 1932 he was the National Geographic's representative and photographer on the Croisière Jaune (Yellow Expedition), the Citroën-sponsored motor journey led by Georges-Marie Haardt that set out from Beirut for Peking. He travelled with the eastbound group through Afghanistan and British India. The expedition ended after Haardt died of pneumonia in Hong Kong in 1932.

Williams retired from the National Geographic in 1953, at the age of 65.

== Death and burial ==
Williams died in Antalya, on Turkey's Mediterranean coast, in June 1963. A register of burials in the American section of the Feriköy Protestant Cemetery, compiled from gravestones and Istanbul and American records, gives his date of death as June 25 and records that he was buried in Istanbul. The Swedish museum authority KulturNav also lists the Feriköy Protestant Cemetery as his burial place.

== Legacy ==
Kalamazoo College holds his diaries, field notes, correspondence and articles in its archives. The college's Maynard Owen Williams Prize for creative nonfiction is named in his memory.

== Selected works ==
- Williams, Maynard Owen (October 1918). "Russia's Orphan Races". National Geographic. Vol. 34, no. 4.
