= Edward Hyams =

British gardener and historian

- Born: 30 September 1910; London, England
- Died: 25 November 1975 (aged 65); Besançon, France
- Occupations: Gardener, historian
- Spouse(s): Hilda Mary Aylett (m. 1933, div. 1967) Mary Patricia Bacon (m. 1973)
- Military career
- Allegiance: United Kingdom
- Branch: Royal Air Force; Royal Navy
- Service years: 1939–1946
- Rank: Lieutenant
- Conflicts: Second World War

Edward Solomon Hyams (30 September 1910 – 25 November 1975) was a British gardener and horticulturalist, historian, novelist and writer, and anarchist. He is known for his writings as a French scholar and socialist historian, and as a gardener.

== Biography ==
=== Early life ===
Edward Hyams was born in Stamford Hill, London, on 30 September 1910, to Arthur (Isaac) Hyams and Annie Dollie Leitson Hyams. Arthur Hyams (b. 19 June 1881) was a "well-known London advertising agent", "of the Borough Billposting Company, London" Annie was born April 1884.

Hyams attend the University College School in London as a child, then went to the Lycée Jaccard boarding school in Lausanne, Switzerland and Lausanne University.

Hyams spent his early adulthood (1929-1933) as a factory worker, among other jobs, including in newspapers. In 1933, Hyams and Hilda Mary Aylett, then 28, married. The two had met at work, served in World War II, and both identified as "Cockney".

=== Literary career and military service ===
Hyams published his first novel, The Wings of the Morning in 1939. Over the next two years he published two more novels, A Time to Cast Away in 1940 and To Sea in a Bowl in 1941. He continued to write novels and short fiction for the rest of his life.

In the 1930s, Hyams was a pacifist and a member of the Peace Pledge Union, but abandoned pacifism upon the outbreak of the Second World War. Hyams joined the Royal Air Force (1939-1941) but was disqualified from being a pilot because of his poor eyesight. Hyams then applied for a transfer to the Royal Navy, which was granted; he spent the rest of the war in the Navy, 1941-1946, promoted to lieutenant. Hyams and Hilda were demobilized in 1947, and settled in Molash, in Kent, England.

=== Gardening and viticulture ===
In Molash, the couple took up gardening, restoring a three-acre cottage garen property. He wrote about this time in his memoir, From the Waste Land, describing the transformation of his home, "Nut Tree Cottages", into a prosperous market garden. Hyams stayed in Molash until 1960, while becoming an increasingly avid horticulturalist.

During this time, Hyams also developed a serious interest in viticulture, and in 1960 moved to south Devon, to re-establish grape vineyards in England. He published The Grape Vine in England in 1949, and edited a volume on English viticulture in 1953, Vineyards in England. In 1965 Hyams published Dionysus: A Social History of the Wine Vine, combining his passions for social history and viticulture, and arguing for hybrid viticulture.

Hyams' most famous work was Soil and Civilisation (1952), a history of farming which advocated organic farming and came out against mechanised agriculture. Soil and Civilisation has been described as an early example of "environmental literature". It also included a favourable depiction of the Incas.

From 1959 to 1974 he penned the gardening column for the Illustrated London News.

He was consulted by the government of Iran when the National Botanic Garden in Tehran was being built.

One of Hyams' last works, published posthumously in 1979, was The Story of England's Flora.

=== Fiction, literary, and translation work ===
Hyams' fiction included science fiction, ghost stories, often satirical, and often with a clear political bent.

His novels included The Astrologer (1950) a satirical science fiction novel about an ecological disaster, and Gentian Violet (1953), a satire in which the hero managed to get elected to Parliament as both Conservative and Labour without being discovered.

Hyams began submitting short fiction to the BBC Third Programme and the New Statesman in the 1950s; after they were accepted, he became a regular contributor to both.

Hyams' literary output also encompassed literary essays, and numerous translations from French of many works of fiction and scholarship. (He won the Scott-Moncreiff Prize in 1964 for his translation of Joan of Arc By Herself and Her Witnesses by the French historian Régine Pernoud. His translations of work by Roger Peyrefitte and Zoé Oldenbourg were also notable, as were his translations of a history of the Marquis de Lafayette and Chopin.

Hyams' work was praised by both Anthony Burgess and Ronald Bryden, the latter describing Hyams as "the most exasperatingly gifted writer in England".

=== Politics and social/political writings ===
Hyams remained political his entire life. An anarchist, Hyams was concerned in particular with the politics of land and agriculture, including the effects of the enclosures of the commons); as such, he has been influential in eco-anarchist thought, and indeed, much of his scholarship anticipated later thinking about the influence of agriculture on civilization. He wrote a biography of anarchist Pierre-Joseph Proudhon.

In the 1950s and 1960s he broadened his travels, ultimately leading to publication of The Last of the Incas (1963) and a 1969 survey of botanic gardens worldwide (Great Botanical Gardens of the World).

Hyams was also interested in the role of violence, writing several studies on assassination, revolution, and the uses of terrorism and assassination for political ends. This included his 1974 book Terrorists and Terrorism, which included chapters on Sergey Nechayev and Avraham Stern.

He was involved with the New Statesman for many years, editing a history of the publication and an anthology of selected works from the journal. Hyams also edited a historical anthology of articles from the New Statesman magazine, New Statesmanship.

Hyams maintained active relations with the Campaign for Nuclear Disarmament.

=== Later personal life and death ===
In 1967, Edward and Hilda's marriage ended. Hyams moved to Brampton in Suffolk in 1970, establishing a third garden on the property of an old Victorian school (described in An Englishman's Garden (1967)) In 1973, Hyams married Mary Patricia Bacon, divorced from Edward Bacon, an editor at the Illustrated London News. He died only two years later, 25 November 1975, at the age of 65, in Besançon, Doubs, France. In his life he had written more than ninety books, broadly ranging across history, ecology, gardening, politics, and fiction, but interconnected by his radical politics and passions.

== Works ==
Fiction

- The Wings of the Morning (1939)
- A Time to Cast Away (1940)
- To Sea in a Bowl (1941, 1942)
- William Medium (1947) (see New York Public Library)
- Blood Money (1948)
- Not in Our Stars (1949)
- The Astrologer: A Satirical Novel (1950)
- Sylvester (1951) [republished as 998 (1952)]
- Gentian Violet (1953)
- Stories and Cream (1954)
- The Slaughter-House Informer (1954)
- Into the Dream (1957)
- Taking It Easy (1958) [republished as Tillotson (1961)]
- The Unpossessed (1960)
- All We Possess (1961)
- A Perfect Stranger (1964)
- The Last Poor Man (1966)
- The Irish Garden (1966)
- Cross Purposes: Four Stories of Love (1967)
- The Mischief Makers (1968)
- The Death Lottery (1971)
- The Final Agenda (1973)
- Prince Habib's Iceberg (1974)
- Morrow's Ants (1975)

short fiction, published in a number of venues

- "Exorcising Baldassare"

other works

- Metropolitan Verses (1934)
- You Know What Sailors Are (1954)
- Armchair Theatre (1956)
- The Man in the Wood (1973)

Social history and anarchism

- Soil and Civilization (1952)
- A Prophecy of Famine: A Warning and the Remedy (1953) with H.J. Massingham
- The Last of the Incas: The Rise and Fall of an American Empire with George Ordish (1963)
- Dionysus: A Social History of the Wine Vine (1965)
- Killing No Murder: A Study of Assassination as a Political Means (1969)
- A Dictionary of Modern Revolution (1973)
- The Millennium Postponed: Socialism from Sir Thomas More to Mao Tse-Tung (1974)
- The Changing Face of England (1974) (also published as The Changing Face of Britain) (1977)
- Terrorists and Terrorism (1974)
- Pierre-Joseph Proudhon: His Revolutionary Life, Mind and Works (1979)

Essays

- "Peyrefitte", The Kenyon Review v.24, n.3, pp. 484–500 (Summer 1962)
- "England" (short stories), The Kenyon Review, v.32, no.1, pp. 89–95 (1970)

Horticultural works

- The Grape Vine in England (1949)
- From the Waste Land (1950) (memoir of his first garden)
- Soil and Civilisation (1952)
- Grapes Under Cloches (1952)
- Melons Under Cloches (1952)
- Strawberry Cultivation (1953) [revised as Strawberry Growing Complete: A System of Procuring Fruit Throughout the Year (1962)]
- The Speaking Garden (1957)
- Vin: The Wine Country of France (1959)
- Odhams Fruit Growers' Encyclopaedia (1960)
- The English Garden, 'The World of Art Library' series (1964, 1966) with 200 photographs by Edwin Smith
- Ornamental Shrubs for Temperate Zone Gardens, Volumes 1-2 (1965)
- Ornamental Shrubs for Temperate Zone Gardens (6 volumes) (1965–67)
- Pleasure from Plants (1966)
- An Englishman's Garden (1967) (biographical description of his own garden at the Victorian school)
- Irish Gardens (1967)
- Lilies with Jan de Graaff and Hyams (1967)
- House Plants (1967, with George Elbert)
- The Gardener's Bedside Book (1968)
- Great Botanical Gardens of the World (1969)
- Of Gardens and Gardeners (1969)
- English Cottage Gardens (1970)
- Capability Brown and Humphry Repton (1971) (double biography of two landscape artists)
- A History of Gardens and Gardening (1971)
- Plants in the Service of Man: 10,000 Years of Domestication (1971)
- Animals in the Service of Man: 10,000 Years of Domestication (1972) [republished as Working for Man: Domestication of Animals (1975)]
- Survival Gardening: How to Grow Vegetables, Herbs, Fruit, Nuts, Wine and Tobacco in Garden or Allotment (1975)
- Growing Camellias with Neil Treseder (1975)
- The Story of England's Flora (1979)

Other contributions

- Gardening correspondent for Illustrated London News and The Spectator, and various horticultural journals
- Columns for New Statesman and Financial Times
- Contributor to Punch

Other works

- The Traveller's Bedside Book (1970, with Mary Bacon)

Editor

- Editor, Vineyards in England (1953)
- Editor, with A. A. Jackson,The Orchard and Fruit Garden: A New Pomona of Hardy and Sub-Tropical Fruits (1961)
- The "New Statesman": The History of the First Fifty Years, 1913-1963 (London, Longmans, 1963)
- New Statesmanship: An Anthology (1963) - anthology of writings from New Statesman)

Translations

- Special Friendships by Roger Peyrefitte (1943) [1958]
- The Exile of Capri by Roger Peyrefitte (1943)
- Family Jewels by Petru Dumitriu (1949)
- The Cornerstone by Zoé Oldenbourg (1954)
- Clochemerle - Babylon by Gabriel Chevallier (1954)
- Diplomatic Conclusions by Roger Peyrefitte (1955) (transl. 1954)
- Human Folly: To Disarm or Perish? by Jules Moch (transl. 1955)
- The Apostle of Liberty: A Life of LaFayette by Maurice de La Fuye and Emilie Babeau (transl. 1956)
- Wicked Village by Gabriel Chevallier (1956)
- Crossing by Jean Reverzy (1956)
- The Awakened by Zoé Oldenbourg (1957)
- Sponger by Jules Renard (1957)
- Taine's Notes on England by Hippolyte Taine (1872; trans. 1957)
- Keys of St. Peter Roger Peyrefitte (1957)
- Enemy by Tibor Meray (1958)
- Niki: The Story of a Dog by Tibor Déry (trans. 1958)
- Shouting Dies Away by Jean Denys (1958)
- Party Is Over by Roger Grenier (1959)
- Knights of Malta by Roger Peyrefitte (1959)
- Tempo di Roma by Alexis Curvers (1959)
- Pueblo by Michel Droit (1959)
- The Cactus Grove by Michel Landa (1960)
- Admiral Togo by Georges Blond (trans. 1960)
- Les Petits Enfants du siècle by Christiane Rochefort (1961)
- Joan of Arc: By Herself and Her Witnesses by Régine Pernoud (1962; Hyams translation, 1965)
- Chopin: A Pictorial Biography by André Boucourechliev (1963)
- To See the White Cliffs by Philippe Ceillier (1965)
- Margaret of Anjou: Queen of England by Philippe Erlanger (trans. 1970)
- China in Transition: A Moment in History by Henri Cartier-Bresson
- The Mask of Comedy by Henri-François Rey
- Josyane and the Welfare by Christiane Rochefort

== Cultivars and gardens ==
Hyams' grape variety cultivars included:

- Muller Thurgau (vinifera cross)
- Madeleine Sylvaner (vinifera cross)
- Seyval Blanc (grape hybrid)
- Baco No. 1 (grape hybrid)
- Tere Dore (grape hybrid)

Gardens

- "Nut Tree Cottages", Molash, Kent
- Hill House Nursery and Garden Landscove, near Ashburton, Devon
