= Joan of Arc by Herself and Her Witnesses =

1962 book

- Author: Régine Pernoud
- Translator: Edward Hyams
- Genre: Biography
- Publication date: 1962
- ISBN: 0-8128-1260-3

Joan of Arc By Herself and Her Witnesses (ISBN 0-8128-1260-3) is a translation of a 1962 book about Joan of Arc by Régine Pernoud. The translator, Edward Hyams, won the 1965 Scott Moncrieff Prize for his work on this book. Pernoud was the founder of the Centre Jeanne d'Arc at Orléans, France, and a noted historian.

Consisting largely of excerpts from the original historical accounts, the book has been noted for this unique style. Saturday Review's article gave the view that: "One feels closer to Joan in these pages than in any of the modern biographies where the author's mannerisms and prejudices often obscure her behind a mist of emotion and controversy."
