= Fanny Agostini =

French journalist and television presenter (born 1988)

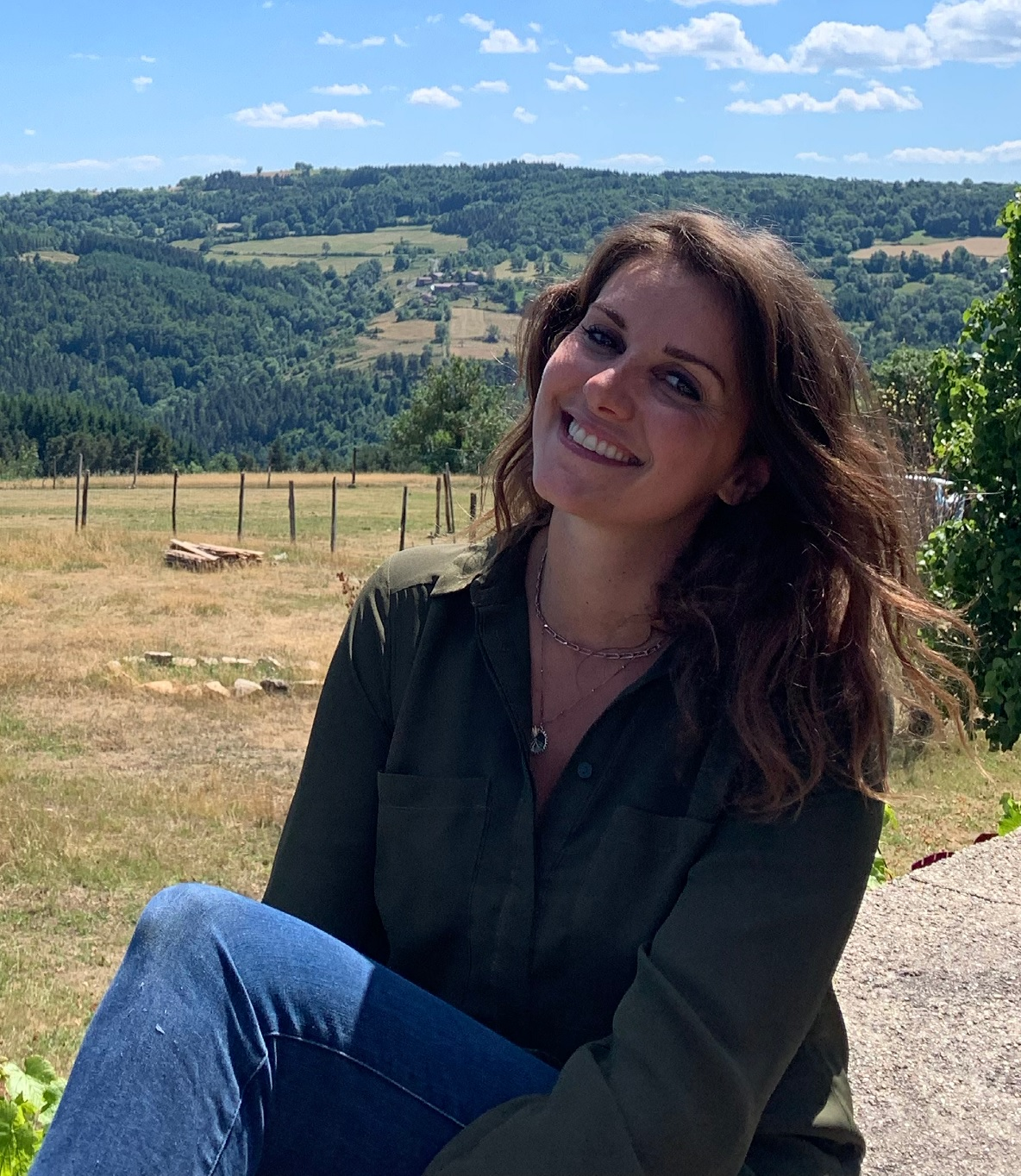
- Born: 8 July 1988 (age 37); La Bourboule, Puy-de-Dôme, France
- Occupation: Television presenter
- Years active: 2011–present
- Notable credit: Thalassa
- Television: France 3 (2017–present)
- Spouse: Henri Landes

Fanny Agostini (born 8 July 1988) is a French journalist and television presenter for France 3.

== Early life and education ==
Fanny Agostini was born in La Bourboule in the department of Puy-de-Dôme, the daughter of pizzeria owners. She was raised by her grandparents. After graduating in political science and literature in Clermont-Ferrand, she joined the radio station France Bleu. She then attended a two-year training course of radio presenter at the Studio École de France of Issy-les-Moulineaux where she graduated in 2009. During this training, she did an internship at RTL with journalist and presenter Julien Courbet and joined the group NextRadioTV to present the weather and the traffic information on RMC and BFM Radio.

== Television career ==
During summer 2011, Philippe Verdier left BFM TV for the weather on France 2, thus vacating his afternoon weather slot on the news channel. Agostini, who did a training course at Météo-France, replaced him in September 2011 for the weather programs between 12:30 and 22:00 from Monday to Friday, alternating the programs broadcast live in Midi-15h and the programs recorded in the afternoon. Since September 2014, she presented the weather programs in the morning while Christophe Person presented the ones in the afternoon. In October 2017, she succeeded to Georges Pernoud to present Thalassa on France 3.

== Personal life ==
Agostini is in a relationship since 2015 with Henri Landes, in charge of a class of sustainable development at Sciences Po. They married on 9 June 2018 at La Bourboule.

== See also ==
- BFM TV
- Thalassa (TV series)
