= Zoé Oldenbourg =

French historian and novelist (1916–2002)

- Born: 31 March 1916; Petrograd, Russia
- Died: 8 November 2002 (aged 86)
- Citizenship: French
- Occupations: Writer, historian
- Writing career
- Genres: Middle Ages, History of France, Crusades, Cathars

Zoé Oldenbourg (Russian: Зоя Сергеевна Ольденбург, romanized: Zoya Sergeyevna Oldenburg; 31 March 1916 – 8 November 2002) was a Russian-born French popular historian and novelist who specialized in medieval French history, in particular the Crusades and Cathars.

== Life ==
She was born in Petrograd, Russia into a family of scholars and historians. Her father Sergei was a journalist and historian, her mother Ada Starynkevich was a mathematician, and her grandfather Sergei was the permanent secretary of the Russian Academy of Sciences in Saint Petersburg. Her early childhood was spent among the privations of the Russian revolutionary period and the first years of communism. Her father fled the country and established himself as a journalist in Paris.

With her family, she emigrated to Paris in 1925 at the age of nine and graduated from the Lycée Molière in 1934 with her Baccalauréat diploma. She went on to study at the Sorbonne and then she studied painting at the Académie Ranson. In 1938 she spent a year in England and studied theology. During World War II she supported herself by hand-painting scarves.

She was encouraged by her father to write and she completed her first work, a novel, Argile et cendres in 1946. Although she wrote her first works in Russian, as an adult she wrote almost exclusively in French.

She married Heinric Idalovici in 1948 and had two children, Olaf and Marie-Agathe.

== Work ==
She combined a high level of scholarship with a deep feeling for the Middle Ages in her historical novels. Her first novel, The World is Not Enough, offered a panoramic view of the twelfth century. Her second, The Cornerstone, was a Book-of-the-Month Club selection in America. Other works include The Awakened, The Chains of Love, Massacre at Montsegur, Destiny of Fire, Cities of the Flesh, and Catherine the Great, a Literary Guild selection. In The Crusades, Zoe Oldenbourg returned to writing about the Middle Ages.

== Awards ==
She won the Prix Femina for her 1953 novel La Pierre angulaire.

== Works ==
=== Fiction ===
- Argile et cendres (1946), published in English as The World is Not Enough (translated by Willard A. Trask).
- La Pierre angulaire (1953), published in English as The Corner-stone (translated by Edward Hyams).
- Réveillés de la vie (1956), published in English as The Awakened (translated by Edward Hyams).
- Les Irréductibles (1958), published in English as The Chains of Love (translated by Michael Bullock).
- Les Brûlés (1960), published in English as Destiny of Fire (translated by Peter Green).
- Les Cités charnelles, ou L'Histoire de Roger de Montbrun (1961), published in English as Cities of the Flesh, or The Story of Roger de Montbrun (translated by Anne Carter).
- Catherine de Russie (1966), published in English as Catherine the Great (translated by Anne Carter).
- La Joie des pauvres (1970), published in English as The Heirs of the Kingdom (translated by Anne Carter).
- La Joie-souffrance (1980).
- Le Procès du rêve (1982).
- Les Amours égarées (1987).
- Déguisements (1989), short stories.

=== Non-fiction ===
- Le Bûcher de Montségur, 16 mars 1244 (1959), published in English as Massacre at Montségur: A History of the Albigensian Crusade (translated by Peter Green).
- Les Croisades (1965), published in English as The Crusades (translated by Anne Carter).
- Saint Bernard (1970), includes a selection of texts on Saint Bernard by Abélard, Pierre le Vénérable, Geoffroi de Clairvaux, Bérenger de Poitiers and Bossuet.
- L'Épopée des cathédrales (1972).
- Que vous a donc fait Israël ? (1974).
- Visages d'un autoportrait (1977), autobiography.
- Que nous est Hécube ?, ou Un plaidoyer pour l'humain (1984).

=== Plays ===
- L'Évêque et la vieille dame, ou La Belle-mère de Peytavi Borsier, pièce en dix tableaux et un prologue (1983).
- Aliénor, pièce en quatre tableaux (1992).
