= Alexandre Jacovleff =

Russian painter (1887–1938)

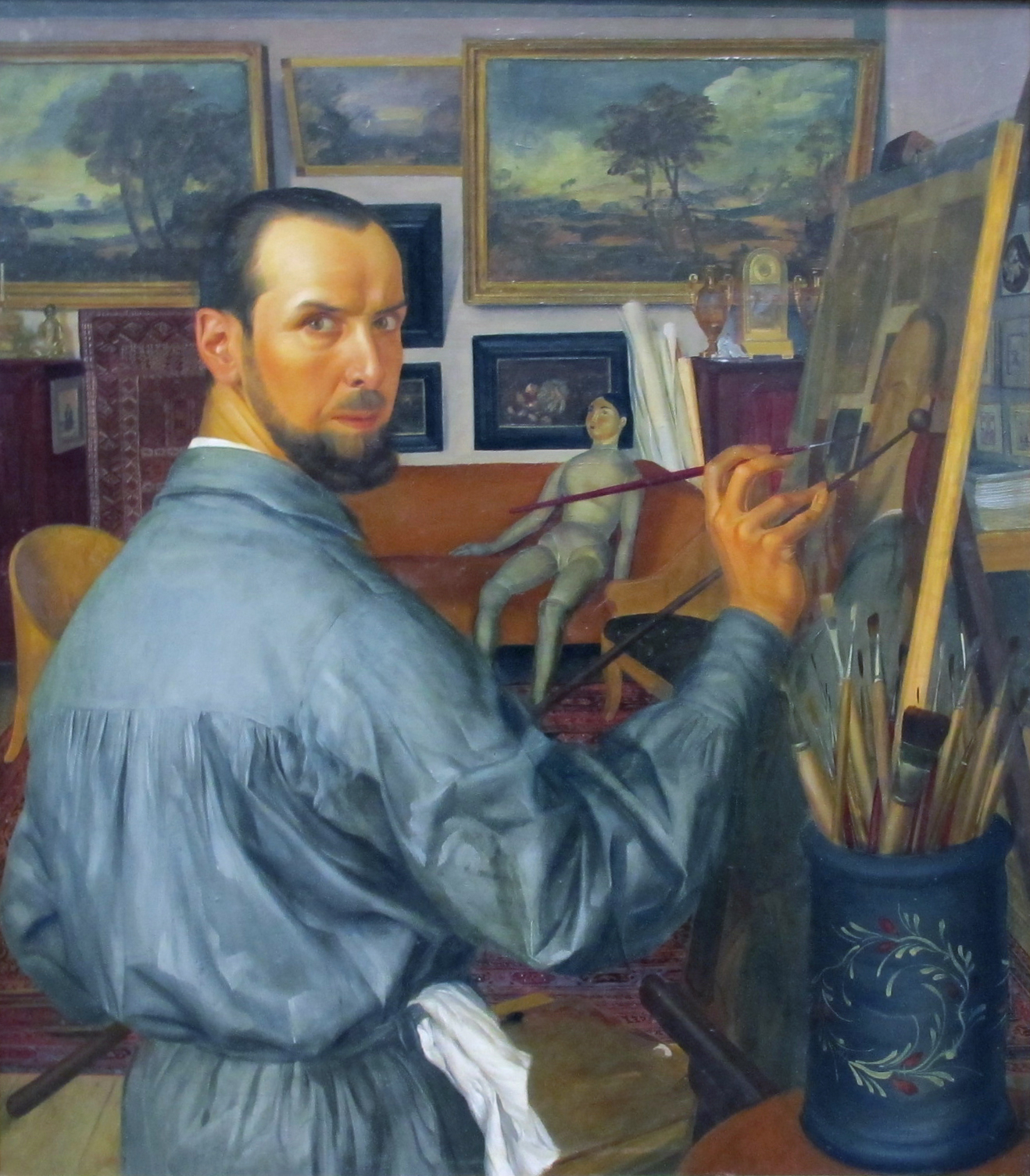
- Born: 1887; Saint Petersburg, Russia
- Died: 1938; Paris, France
- Education: Imperial Academy of Arts
- Known for: Painting; Etching
- Notable work: Belshazzar's Feast, (1983–84); Witness (2000)
- Movement: Neoclassicism

Alexandre Yevgenievich Jacovleff (also Iacovleff or Yakovleff; Russian: Александр Евгеньевич Яковлев, romanized: Aleksandr Yevgenyevich Yakovlev; 25 June [O.S. 13 June] 1887 – 12 May 1938) was a Russian neoclassicist painter, draughtsman, designer and etcher.

== Biography ==
Alexandre was the son of a naval officer from Saint Petersburg, where he was born. Between 1905 and 1913, he studied at the Imperial Academy of Arts under Kardovsky. While a student he enjoyed drawing and worked for the art magazines Apollon, Satiricon, Niva, Novyi Satirikon (New Satiricon). After 1912, Jacovleff was a member of Mir Iskusstva. Jacovleff's large group portrait On Academic Dacha was exhibited at the Baltic Exhibition in Malmö in 1912, and received praise from the critics, including Alexandre Benois.

During his student days he befriended another Academy student, Vasiliy Shukhaev. They were almost inseparable, and received the nickname of The Twins.

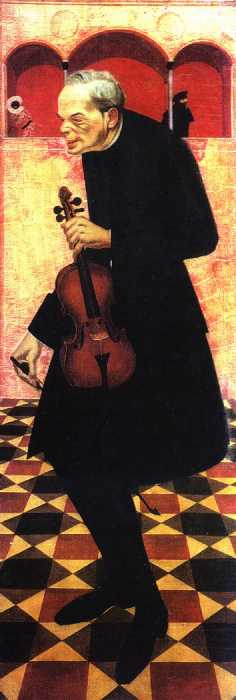
Violinist, 1915

In 1913, Jackovleff received the rank of an Artist and a scholarship to study abroad for his paintings Bathing (Купание) and In Banya. He also composed his famous In The Day Shining painting the same year. He later went to Italy and Spain together with Shukhaev. There they painted their double self-portrait as Harlequin and Pierrot. Another important work of that period was Violinist painted in 1915. At that time Jacovleff attempted to integrate Renaissance art with Primitivism, particularly the Russian lubok.

In 1915, Jacovleff returned to Petrograd. The same year his works were shown at a Mir Iskusstva exhibition and caused mixed reactions. While some critics praised them, the Academy of Arts rejected them. Jackovleff painted a lot of Sanguine drawings including the Shalyapin portrait. He frescoed Firsanov's mansion in Moscow, and the artistic cabaret Prival Komediantov in Petrograd. He also lectured on Women's Architect Courses and organized his own artistic movement (together with Shukhaev, Radlov and Kardovsky): St. Luke Guild of Painters (Цех Живописцев имени Святого Луки).

In the summer of 1917, Jacovleff received a scholarship to study in the Far East. He traveled to Mongolia, China and Japan (1917–1919). At the end of the First World War, he celebrated at the Italian legation in Beijing together with the Italian chargé d'affaires Daniele Varè. Subsequently he settled in Paris and obtained French citizenship. His work was part of the painting event in the art competition at the 1924 Summer Olympics.

Between 1924 and 1925 he took part in an expedition to the Sahara desert and Equatorial Africa organized by Citroën (Croisière Noire). His African paintings were a big success and as a result Jacovleff was awarded the Legion of Honor by the French government in 1926. In 1928, Jacovleff organized a large personal exhibition in Moscow.

Between 1931 and 1932, he was the Artistic Adviser of another Citroën expedition, this time across Asia: the Yellow Expedition. He travelled through Syria, Iran, Afghanistan, Mongolia and China, and created a number of orientalist paintings.

From 1934 to 1937, Jacovleff was the Director of the Painting Department of the School of the Museum of Fine Arts, Boston. He spent the last months of his life in Paris and Capri. He died in Paris in 1938, after an unsuccessful surgery.

== Family ==
- His father, Yevgeniy Iacovleff (1857–1898), was an engineer-inventor, creator of the internal combustion engine Russian, founder and owner of the first Russian factory of gas engines and oil
- His mother, Sofia Kuzmina (? 1939), was the first woman doctor of mathematical sciences in Russia
- His brother, Alexei (en: Alexis Jackson; ?, Russian Empire – 1964, United States) was an architect
- His niece Tatiana Yakovleva (Tatiana du Plessix Liberman; 1906—1991), the daughter of Alexei, is one of the beautiful women of Paris, the poet Vladimir Mayakovsky was in love with her and spent the poems
- His niece Ludmila Yakovleva (1908 — ?), the daughter of Alexei, is a French dancer, actress
- His sister, Alexandra (Sandra) (Alexandra Yakovleva; 1889–1979), was an opera singer whose husband, an officer of the Imperial Army, was killed by the revolutionary sailors, she and her mother fled revolutionary Russia and took refuge with his Alexander brother living in Paris. She has performed in the imperial troops in St. Petersburg (Russia), then in Paris, in troop of Alexey Tsereteli; during 1949–1979 Professor of Conservatoire Rachmaninoff
- His first wife is the actress Bella Shensheva (they were divorced; their child died), who committed suicide in 1929 in Berlin.

== Gallery ==
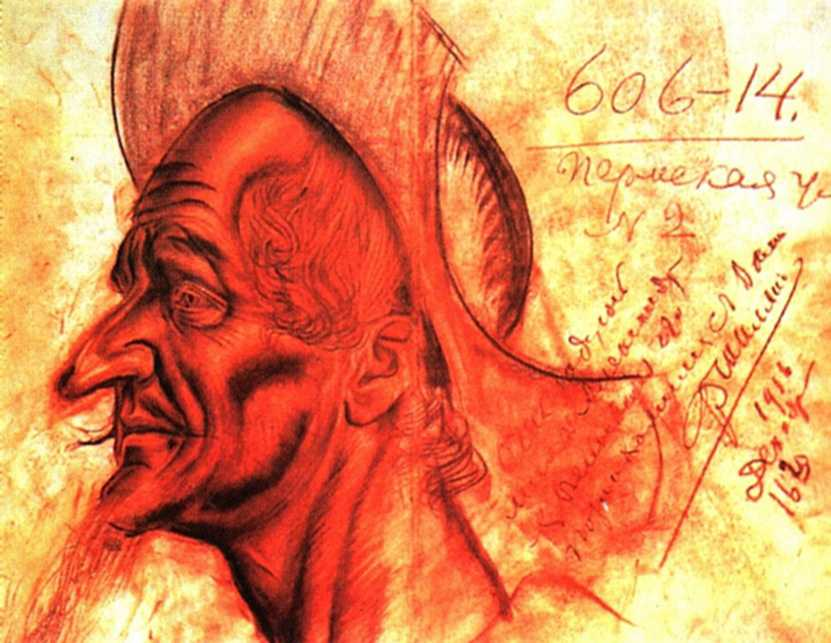
Feodor Chaliapin as Don Quichotte, 1916

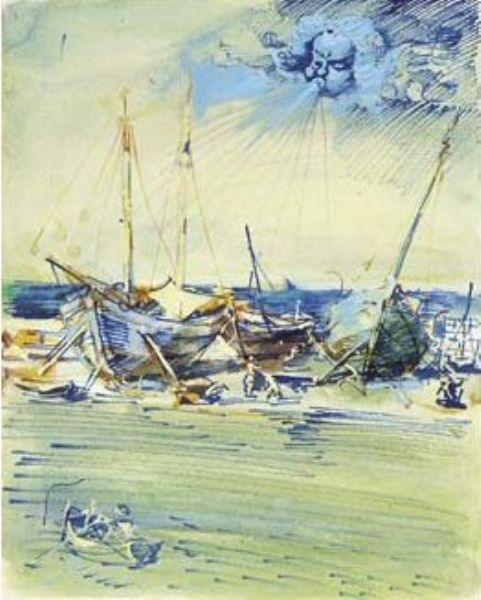
Aeolus

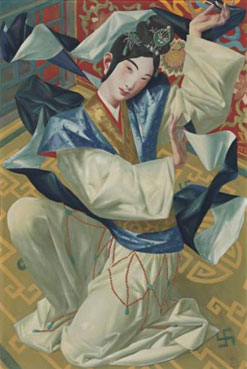
Kabuki dancer

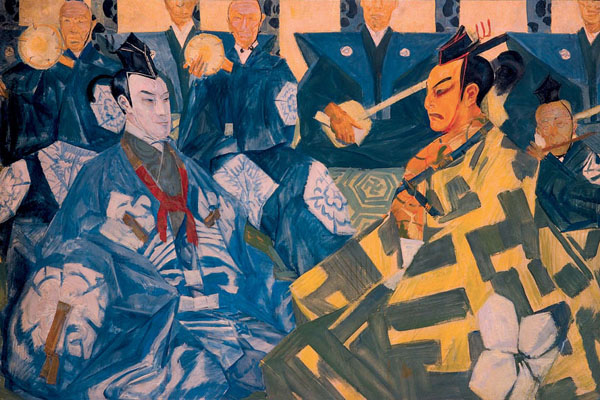
Kabuki

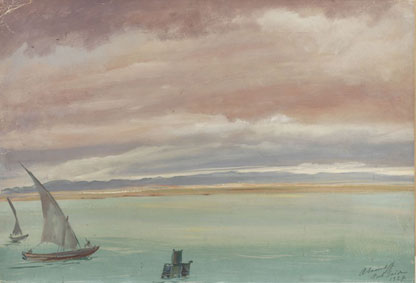
Port Said

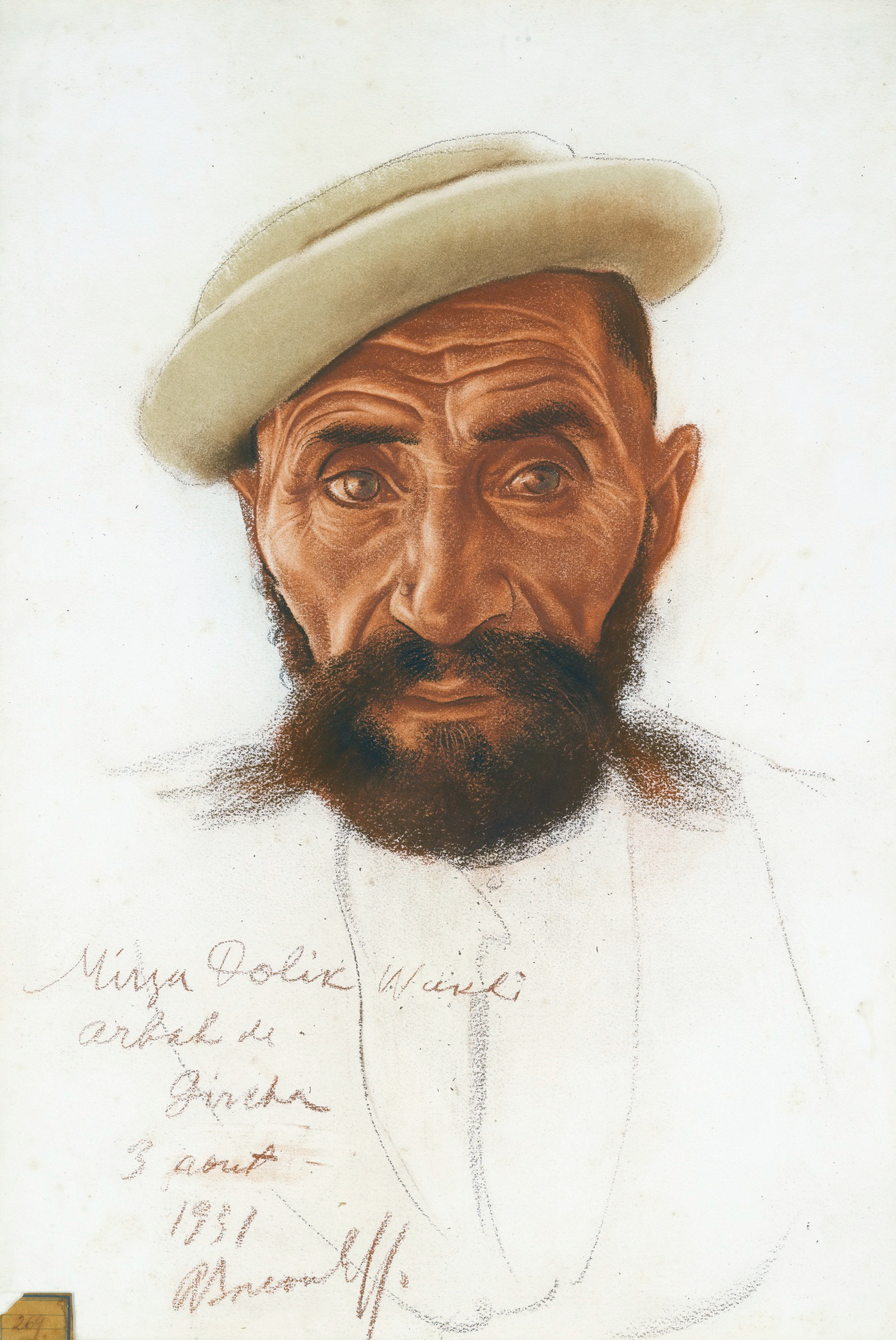
Portrait of Chief Afghan Mirza Dolik Wakhi from Gircha village (a chief of a clan of Wakhi people)

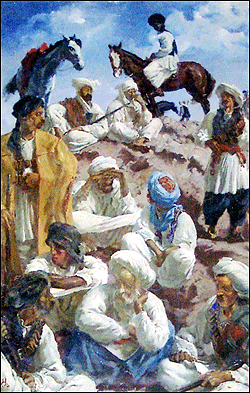
Painting entitled Afghans

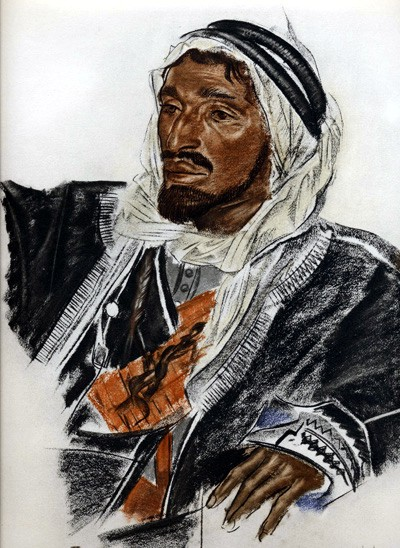
Sheikh Sattam de Haddadin of Palmyra

== See also ==
- List of Russian artists
- List of Orientalist artists
- Orientalism

== Sources ==
- Milner, John (1993). "YAKOVLEV, Aleksandr Evgen'evich". A Dictionary of Russian and Soviet Artists, 1420-1970. Antique Collectors' Club. p. 643. ISBN 978-1-85149-182-7.
- Jackovleff in Krugosvet encyclopedia (in Russian)
- Jackovleff in the Staratel library (in Russian)
- Jacovleff on the site of Tate Gallery
