= Jean Baptiste Douville =

Jean Baptiste Douville (1794–1837), French traveller, was born at Hambye, in the department of Manche. Having at an early age inherited a fortune, he decided to gratify his taste for foreign travel. According to his own profession he visited India, Kashmir, Khorasan, Persia, Asia Minor and many parts of Europe. In 1826 he went to South America, and in 1827 left Brazil for the Portuguese possessions on the West Coast of Africa, where his presence in March 1828 is proved by the mention made of him in letters of Castello Branco, the governor-general of Luanda.

In May 1831 he reappeared in France, claiming to have pushed his explorations into the very heart of central Africa. His story was readily accepted by the Société de Géographie of Paris, which hastened to recognize his services by assigning him the great gold medal, and appointing him their secretary for the year 1832. On the publication of his narrative, Voyage au Congo et dans l'interieur de l'Afrique Equinoxiale, which occupied three volumes and was accompanied by an elaborate atlas, public enthusiasm ran high.

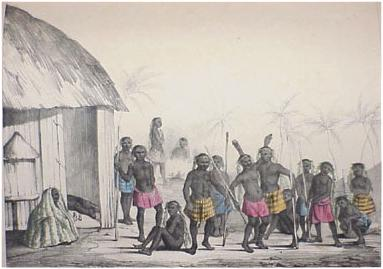
Illustration from Douville's "Atlas du Voyage au Congo"

Before the year 1832 was out, however, it was established that Douville's voyage was romance and not verity. He had probably been inspired by the appearance of René Caillié's account of his journey to Timbuktu, and wished to obtain a share of the fame attaching to African explorers. Douville tried vainly to establish the truth of his story in Ma Defense (1832), and Trente Mois de ma Vie, ou Quinze Mois avant et Quinze Mois aprés ma Voyage au Congo (1833).

Mile Audrun, a lady to whom he was about to be married, committed suicide from grief at the disgrace; and the adventurer withdrew in 1833 to Brazil, and proceeded to make explorations in the Amazon Basin. According to Dr G. Gardner, in his Travels in the Interior of Brazil (1846), he was murdered in 1837 on the banks of the São Francisco River for charging too high for his medical assistance. Douville may well have explored part of the province of Angola, and Sir Richard Burton maintained that the Frenchman's descriptions of the country of the Congo were lifelike; that his observations on the anthropology, ceremonies, customs and maladies of the people were remarkably accurate; and that even the native words used in his narrative were "for the most part given with unusual correctness." It has been shown, however, that the chief source of Douville's inspiration was a number of unpublished Portuguese manuscripts to which he had access.

== Bibliography ==
His published journals include:

- Un voyage au Congo, 1827-1828: les tribulations d’un aventurier en Afrique équinoxiale. édition établie et présentée par Chantal Edel. Paris: La Table ronde, c1991. (ISBN 2-7103-0463-5)
- Voyage au Congo et dans l’intérieur de l’Afrique équinoxiale, fait dans les années 1828, 1829 et 1830. Paris: Chez J. Renouard, 1832. (3 volumes)
