= Sasha Chorny =

Russian poet and satirist

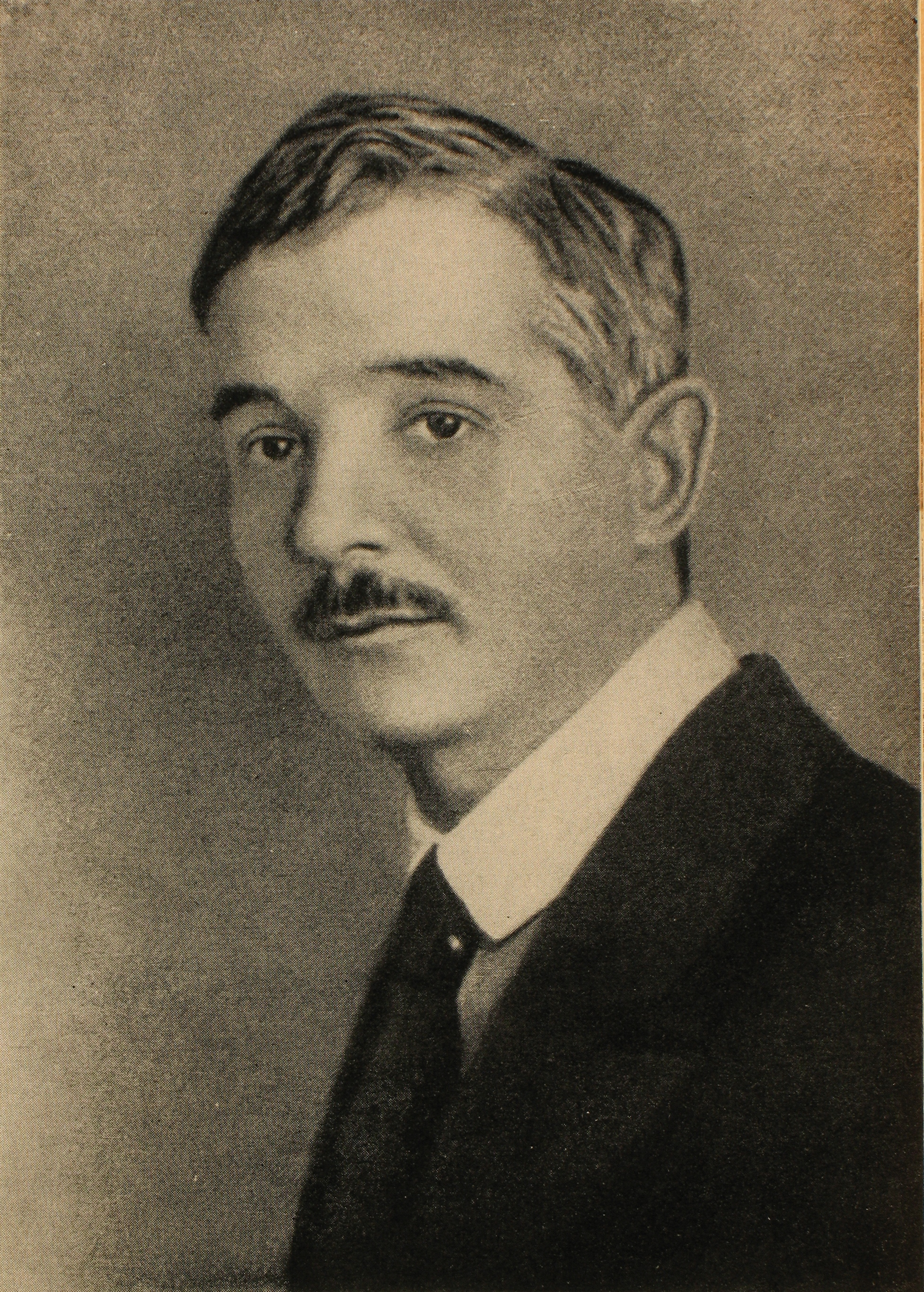

Alexander Mikhailovich Glikberg (Russian: Алекса́ндр Миха́йлович Гли́кберг, IPA: [ɐlʲɪkˈsandr mʲɪˈxajləvʲɪdʑ ˈɡlʲiɡbʲɪrk]; 13 October [O.S. 1 October] 1880 – 5 July 1932), better known as Sasha Chorny or Cherny (Russian: Са́ша Чёрный, IPA: [ˈsaʂə ˈtɕɵrnɨj]), was a Russian poet, satirist and children's writer.

== Early years ==
Alexander Glikberg was born into a Jewish family of pharmacists in Odessa, Russian Empire (currently in Ukraine) on October 13 N.S. 1880. The Glikberg family was not a happy one: his mother suffered from hysteria and children were bad for her nerves; his father often became violent and severely punished his children. It so happened that among the five Glikberg children there were two Alexanders (or Sashas for short), the blond Sasha was usually called White Sasha (Белый Саша in Russian) and the brunet Black Sasha (Чёрный Саша in Russian).

The Glikberg children could not enter a gymnasium because of the quota restriction for enrollment of Jews in schools in Imperial Russia. Eventually, the Glikbergs solved the problem by baptizing themselves and their children. After this, in 1889, the children entered the Odessa gymnasium. Alexander found studying in the gymnasium akin to boring bureaucratic service. At the age of fifteen, he ran away from home. For some time he lived with his aunt in Saint Petersburg, but after being expelled from a Saint Petersburg gymnasium for failing algebra, he was left homeless and without money. Neither his parents nor other relatives responded to his letters and pleas for help.

Fortunately for Alexander, one of his stories was published by the journalist Alexander Yablonovsky in the popular newspaper Syn Otechestva. The article was read by K. K. Rochet, a French-Russian living in Zhitomir, who decided to adopt the boy. Alexander entered a Zhitomir gymnasium, from which he was also eventually expelled after a conflict with the principal. Alexander served two years in the Army and then got a job as a customs officer in the village of Novoselytsia on the border with Austria-Hungary. In 1904, he returned to his adoptive family in Zhitomir and worked as a journalist for the magazine Volynsky Vestnik. The magazine went bankrupt within two months, and Alexander decided to continue his journalistic career in Saint Petersburg.

== Poet ==
On moving to Saint Petersburg, he worked an administrative job for the Warsaw – Saint Petersburg Railway. There he met his wife, Maria Ivanovna Vasilieva, who was his manager at the railroad. She was a few years older than him, better educated, and richer. In Chorny's verse, marriage to a co-worker was often noted as the worst fate for a person. Despite this, their marriage seemed to have been a happy one and lasted their whole lives.

They spent their honeymoon in Italy, in 1905. After returning to Saint Petersburg, Alexander published a collection of verse titled Nonsense (Чепуха) in the magazine Zritel using the pen name Sasha Chorny. The magazine was closed by the government as a result of these verses, but their effect on the readers was huge. The verses were distributed throughout the country, rewritten by hand, and Chorny soon became a popular and sought after author.

Between 1906 and 1907, Sasha Chorny lived in Germany and studied at the Ruprecht Karl University of Heidelberg. In 1908, he returned to Saint Petersburg and wrote for the popular magazine Novyi Satirikon to wide popular acclaim. "When somebody gets an issue of the magazine, the first things he looks for are the Sasha Chorny poems. There isn't a student, physician, or lawyer that does not know Chorny's verses by heart," wrote Korney Chukovsky, who was also a Satirikon contributor. Among the admirers of his verses was Vladimir Mayakovsky, who knew many of his poems by heart and often recited them. In 1910, Sasha Chorny published his book of verses, Satires, followed in 1911 by another one, Satires and Lyrics. He also published the children's books Tuk-Tuk (Knock-Knock) in 1913 and Live ABC (1914).

== War and emigration ==
During World War I, Sasha Chorny served as a private at a field hospital. After the October Revolution, he immigrated to Vilnius, then to Germany, where he worked for the Berlin magazine Fire-bird, then to France, where he worked for the Parisian Russian newspaper. In 1923, he published his third book of verses, Thirst. In 1927, he was a founder of a Russian colony in the village La Favière in Provence.

In emigration, he wrote the poem Who lives well in emigration (Кому в эмиграции жить хорошо, 1931-1932) and prose Non-serious stories (Несерьезные рассказы, 1928) Soldiers' tales (Солдатские сказки, published in 1933). After his death his fourth book of verse Children's Island (Детский остров) was published.

He died of a heart attack while helping to put out a fire in the town of Lavandou in the South of France on July 5, 1932. Legend has it that Chorny's dog Micky, the 'author' of the Chorny story Micky the Fox Terrier's Diary, lay on the chest of Sasha Chorny and died with his owner.

Vladimir Nabokov, in his eulogy, said, "He left only a few books and a quiet, beauteous shadow."

Dmitri Shostakovich set five of Chorny's poems to music for his song cycle Satires (Pictures of the Past), op. 109.
