= Georges-Marie Haardt =

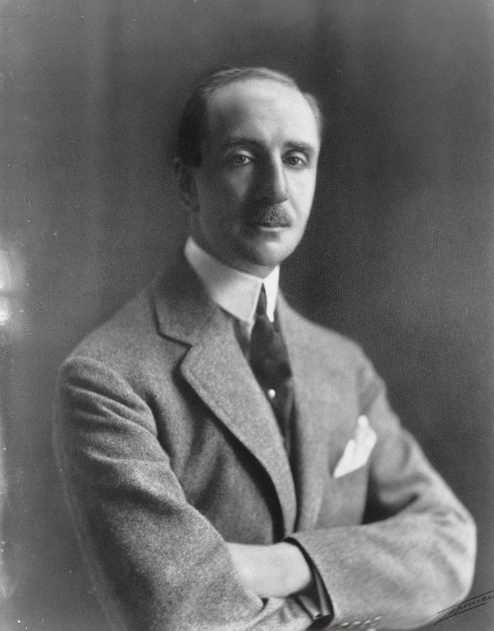
- Haardt c. 1925 – c. 1930
- Born: July 12, 1884; Naples, Kingdom of Italy
- Died: March 16, 1932 (aged 47); British Hong Kong
- Resting place: Passy Cemetery
- Occupations: Engineer; explorer; industrialist

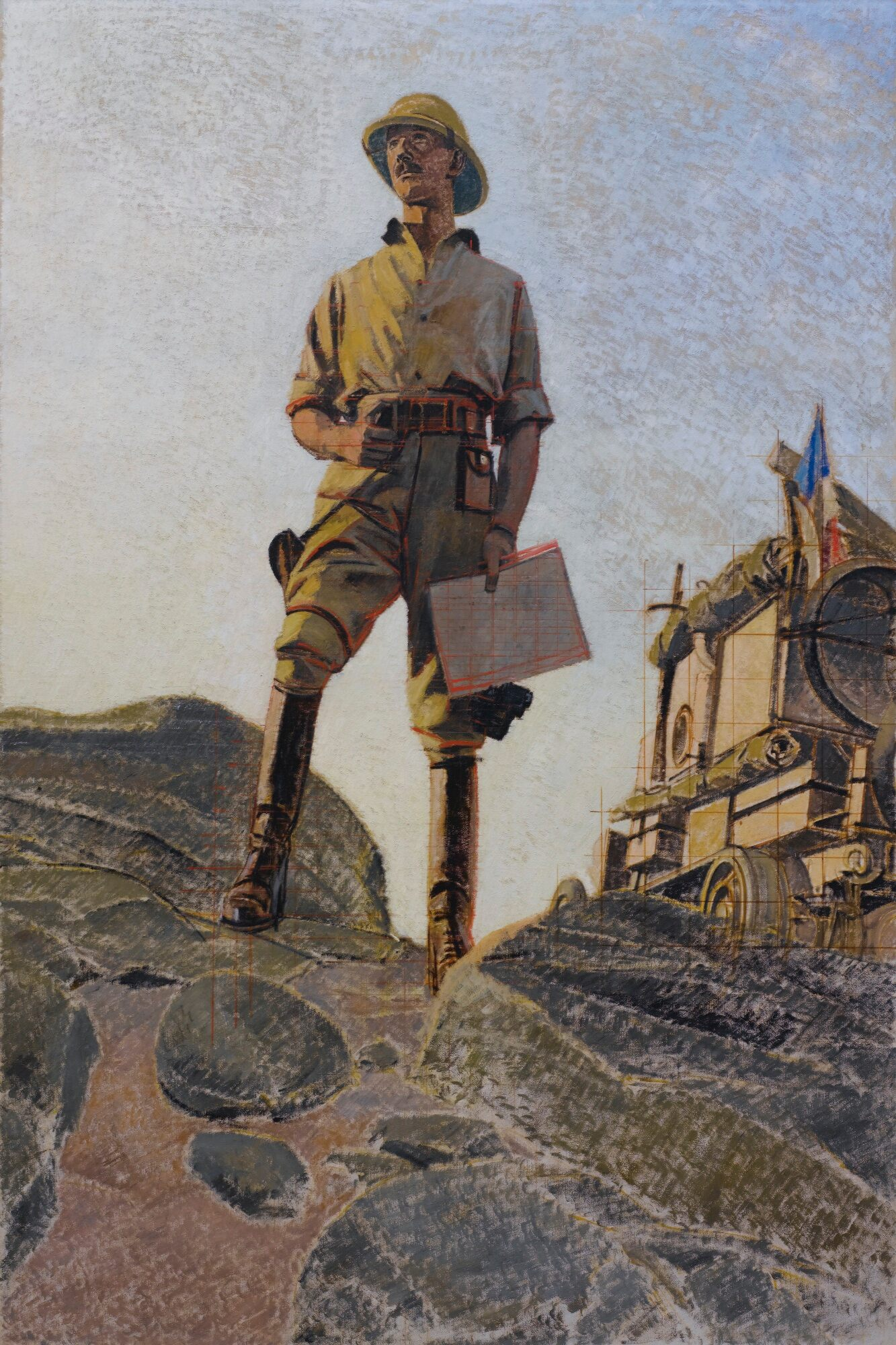
Bernard Boutet de Monvel, Portrait of Georges-Marie Haardt, 1925.

Georges-Marie Haardt (12 July 1884 – 16 March 1932) was an engineer, explorer and industrialist, working in Automobiles Citroën for its first twenty years. He was also a close friend of André Citroën.

== Life ==
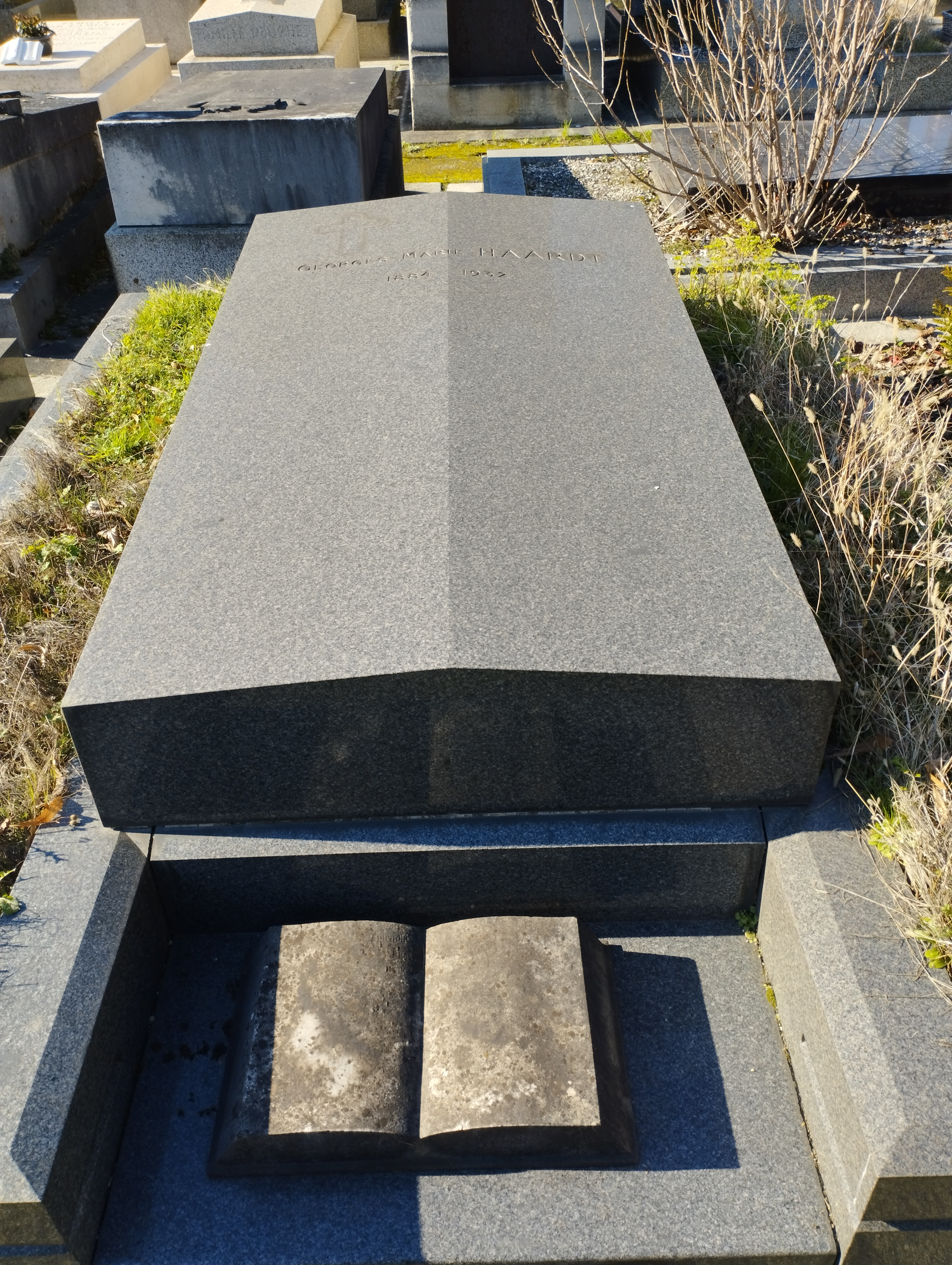
His tomb.

He was born to Belgian parents in Naples. He first joined the Citroën firm as a sales manager, before becoming its director general from 1905 to 1923. He was also vice-president of the Société anonyme André Citroën and director general of Mors from 1908 to 1914. He was a member of the Automobile Club de France.

He served in France's tank corps in the First World War and was made a Knight of the Legion of Honour in 1923, rising to Officer in 1925 and Commander in 1932. In 1929 he was naturalised as a French citizen. Little is known of his private life besides the fact that he was married, was a Protestant, and lived in an apartment on rue de Rivoli in Paris. An apartment which in 1927 he had decorated in an Art Déco style by Jacques-Émile Ruhlmann.

The apartment also acted as a showcase for portraits by Alexandre Jacovleff, who went on the Black Expedition and Yellow Expedition, both led by Haardt. Haardt's motto, inscribed on the side of his command vehicles on those expeditions, was "Res, non verba" (deeds not words). Before the Black and Yellow Expeditions he also led the first motorised crossing of the Sahara. Flu complicated by double pneumonia contracted on the return journey on the Yellow Expedition led to his death on March 16, 1932. He was buried in the 12th division of the cimetière de Passy.

== Recognition ==
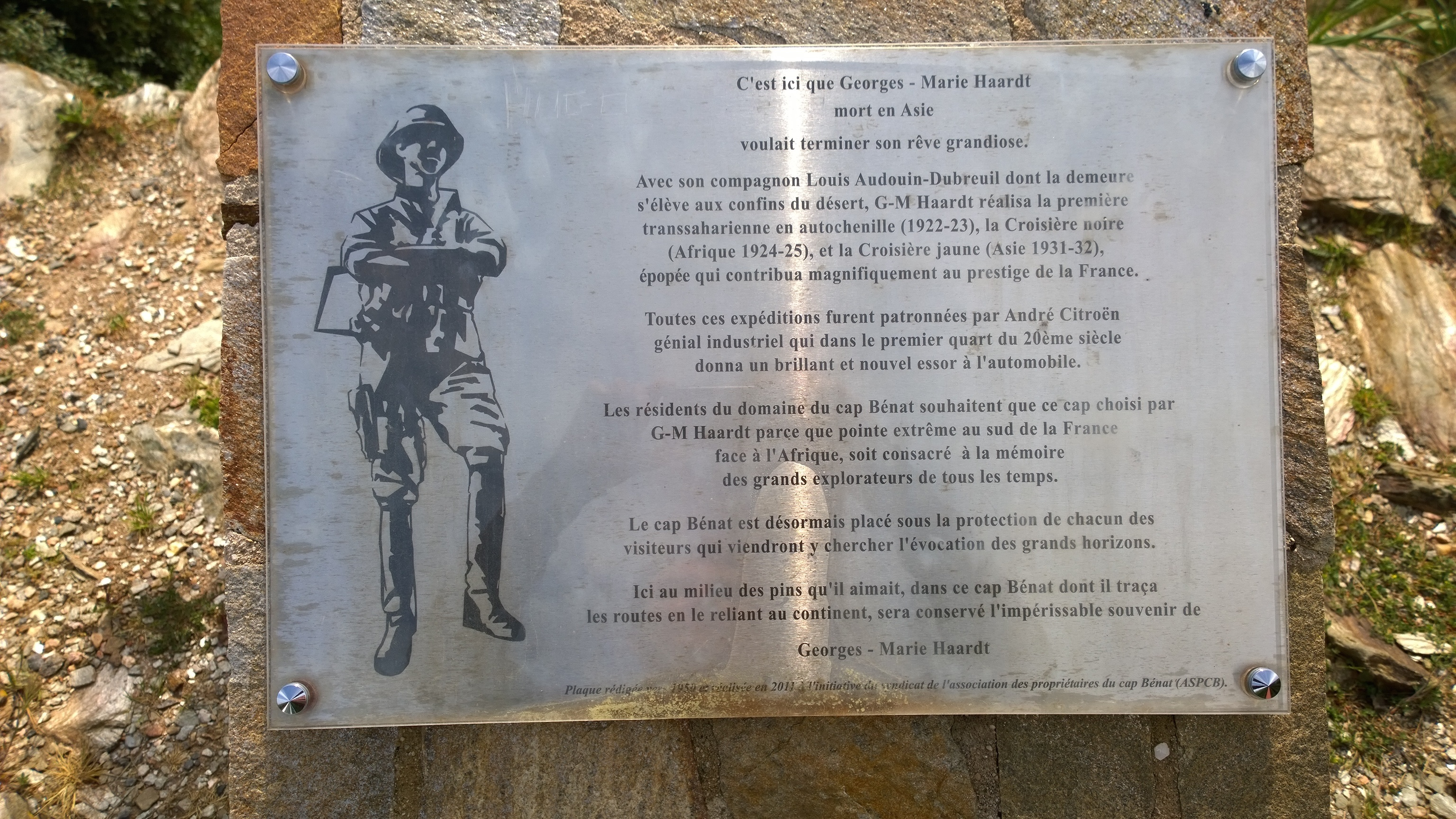
Plaque set up by the residents' association at Cap Bénat, identified as the closest point in southern France to north Africa.

In January 2015 the 2016 class at the ENSTA Bretagne was named after Haardt by its sponsor Yann Vincent, industrial and supply chain director of PSA Peugeot Citroën.

== Bibliography (in French) ==
- Georges-Marie Haardt; Louis Audouin-Dubreuil (1923). Le Raid Citroën. La Première traversée du Sahara en automobile. De Touggourt à Tombouctou par l'Atlantide. Bernard Boutet de Monvel. Paris: Plon. p. 5-24.. ASIN: B001D4XDL0.
- Georges-Marie Haardt; Louis Audouin-Dubreuil (1926). Les nuits du Hoggar: Poèmes touareg recueillis par Georges-Marie Haardt et Louis Audouin-Dubreuil ; ornés de bois gravés par Galanis ; d'après les dessins de Robert-Raphaël Haardt. Paris: Editions d'Art Devambez. BnF FRBNF45853733.
- Georges-Marie Haardt and Louis Audouin-Dubreuil, 'La Croisière noire. Récit des explorateurs : [Documents concernant le film "la Croisière noire", 1926'], La Revue de France, 1 April 1926, p. 504-530 (BNF 38740976)
- Georges-Marie Haardt; Louis Audouin-Dubreuil (1927). La croisière noire. Expédition Citroën Centre-Afrique. Paris: Plon.
- Alexandre Iacovleff (1927). Dessins et peintures d'Afrique : exécutés au cours de l'Expédition Citroën Centre Afrique, deuxième mission Haardt, Audouin-Dubreuil. Paris: Jules Meynial.
- Georges Le Fèvre (1933). La Croisière jaune : expédition Citroën Centre-Asie. Troisième mission Haardt - Audouin-Dubreuil. Paris: Plon.
- Georges Le Fèvre (prefaces by Vadime Elisseeff, André Citroën and Louis Audouin-Dubreuil, illustrations by Alexandre Jacovleff), La Croisière jaune : expédition Citroen Centre-Asie, Haardt - Audouin-Dubreuil, Paris, L'Asiathèque, coll. « Routes de la Soie », 1991, 343 p. (ISBN 2-901795-39-0, ISSN 1158-5595)
- Alison Murray, 'Le tourisme Citroën au Sahara (1924-1925)', Vingtième Siècle. Revue d'histoire, no 68, 2000, p. 95-108
- Ariane Audouin-Dubreuil (2004). La Croisière Noire. Sur la trace des explorateurs du XIXe siècle. La Société de géographie - La Société des explorateurs. Glénat. EAN 9782723448581.
- Ariane Audouin-Dubreuil (2014). La Croisière Noire : les documents inédits. Sur la trace des expéditions Citroën en Centre-Afrique. La Société de Géographie. Glénat. EAN 9782344003763.
- Ariane Audouin-Dubreuil (2019). La Croisière Jaune. La grande expédition Citroën 1931-1932. La Société de géographie. Glénat. EAN 9782344039458.
