= Régine Pernoud =

French historian and archivist

- Born: June 17, 1909; Château-Chinon, Nièvre, France
- Died: April 22, 1998 (aged 88)

Academic background
- Education: BA, PhD
- Alma mater: Sorbonne

Academic work
- Discipline: Historian
- Sub-discipline: Medieval studies

Régine Pernoud (17 June 1909 in Château-Chinon, Nièvre – 22 April 1998 in Paris) was a French historian and archivist. Pernoud was one of the most prolific medievalists in 20th century France; more than any other single scholar of her time, her work advanced and expanded the study of Joan of Arc.

== Career ==
In 1929, she obtained a baccalauréat universitaire ès lettres (BA) at the University of Aix-en-Provence. She moved to Paris where she entered the École nationale des chartes which she left in 1933 with a diploma as an archivist-paleographer. In 1935, she was awarded a doctorate in medieval history from the Sorbonne. Having grown up in an impoverished family, she worked in various professions (including as a teacher, a coach, and an archivist) while completing her university studies and while waiting for a post in a museum. She later became curator at the Museum of Fine Arts, Reims, in 1947, at the Museum of the History of France in 1949, at the National Archives, and at the Centre of Joan of Arc (which she had founded in 1974 at the request of André Malraux).

She is known for writing extensively about Joan of Arc and the social standing of women in the Middle Ages (500 - 1500), e.g., on Robert of Arbrissel who in 1099 founded the double monastery - one with nuns, and one with monks - of Fontevraud, where he put a nun, Petronille de Chemillé, who was 22 years of age, in charge. She primarily did the work of a medieval historian, though she also published several popular works. She was a founding member of the learned society, the Académie du Morvan, in 1967.

She is the aunt of Georges Pernoud, the presenter of the TV series Thalassa.

== Awards ==
She received the Grand Prize of the City of Paris in 1978 and in 1997 the Académie Française awarded her for her lifetime's work.

== Bibliography ==
- Essai sur l'histoire du port de Marseille des origines à la fin du XIII^{e}, doctoral thesis presented to the Faculté des lettres de l'Université de Paris, 1935
- L'Unité française, PUF, 1944
- Lumière du Moyen Âge, Grasset, 1944
- Les villes marchandes aux XIVe et XVe siècles, impérialisme et capitalisme au Moyen-âge, La Table Ronde, 1948
- Vie et mort de Jeanne d'Arc; les témoignages du procès de réhabilitation 1450-1456, Hachette, 1953
- Les grandes époques de l'art en Occident, Ed. du Chêne, 1954
- Les Gaulois, Seuil, 1957
- Les Croisés, Hachette, 1959
- Un Chef d'État, Saint Louis de France, Gabalda et cie, 1960
- Histoire de la bourgeoisie en France; I. Des origines aux temps modernes; II. Les temps modernes, Seuil, 1960–1962
- Les Croisades, Julliard, 1960
- Histoire du peuple français ; I. Des origines au moyen âge; , Nouvelle Librairie de France, 1961 (Other volumes :II. De Jeanne d'Arc à Louis XIV; III. De la régence à 1848; IV. De 1848 à nos jours are by three other authors)
- Croyants et incroyants d'aujourd'hui, Cerf, 1962
- Jeanne d'Arc par elle-même et par ses témoins, Seuil, 1962
- Notre Dame de Paris, La Documentation française, 1963
- L'histoire des rois mages : selon l'Évangile de saint Matthieu, Trianon, 1964
- La Formation de la France, PUF, 1966
- Aliénor d'Aquitaine, Albin Michel, 1966
- Héloïse et Abélard, Albin Michel, 1967
- 8 mai 1429, la libération d'Orléans, Gallimard, 1969
- L'histoire racontée à mes neveux, Stock, 1969 illustrated by René Follet
- Jeanne devant les Cauchons, Seuil, 1970
- Beauté du Moyen Âge, Gautier Languereau, 1971
- La Reine Blanche, Albin Michel, 1972
- Les Templiers, PUF, col. Que sais-je?, 1974
- Pour en finir avec le Moyen Âge, Seuil, 1977
- Les Hommes de la Croisade, Tallandier, 1977
- La Femme au temps des cathédrales, Stock, 1980
- Sources de l'art roman (avec Madeleine Pernoud), Berg international, 1980
- Jeanne d'Arc (avec Madeleine Pernoud), Seuil, 1981
- Christine de Pisan, Calmann-Lévy, 1982
- Le Tour de France médiéval : l'histoire buissonnière (avec Georges Pernoud), Stock, 1982
- La Plume et le parchemin, Denoël, 1983
- Jeanne et Thérèse, Seuil, 1984
- Les Saints au Moyen Âge : la sainteté d'hier est-elle pour aujourd'hui ?, Plon, 1984
- Saint Louis et le crépuscule de la féodalité, A. Michel, coll. L'homme et l'événement, 1985
- Le Moyen Âge pour quoi faire ? (with Raymond Delatouche and Jean Gimpel). Stock, 1986.
- Isambour : la reine captive, Stock, 1987
- Richard Cœur de Lion, Fayard (1988), republished by Le Grand Livre du Mois, 1995
- Jeanne d'Arc et la guerre de Cent ans, Denoël, 1990
- La Femme au temps des croisades, Stock, 1990
- La Vierge et les saints au Moyen âge, C. de Bartillat, coll. Esprits, 1991
- La spiritualité de Jeanne d'Arc, Mame, 1992
- Villa Paradis : souvenirs, Stock, 1992
- Hildegarde de Bingen : conscience inspirée du XII^{e}, le Grand livre du mois, 1994
- J'ai nom Jeanne la Pucelle, coll. Découvertes Gallimard (no. 198), Paris: Gallimard, 1994
- Réhabilitation de Jeanne d'Arc, reconquête de la France, Éd. du Rocher-J.-P. Bertrand, 1995
- Les Templiers, chevaliers du Christ, coll. Découvertes Gallimard (no. 260), Paris: Gallimard, 1995, reprint 2009
- Celui par qui la Gaule devint chrétienne, Gallimard jeunesse, 1996
- Jardins de monastères, Actes Sud, 1996
- Martin de Tours, Bayard-Centurion, 1996
- Saint Jérôme : père de la Bible (with Madeleine Pernoud), Éd. du Rocher, 1996
- Jeanne d'Arc, Napoléon : le paradoxe du biographe, Éd. du Rocher, 1997
- Histoire et lumière, Éd. du Cerf, 1998
- Visages de femmes au Moyen Âge, Zodiaque, 1998
