= Novyi Satirikon =

Weekly satirical magazine in the Russian Empire (1908–1918)

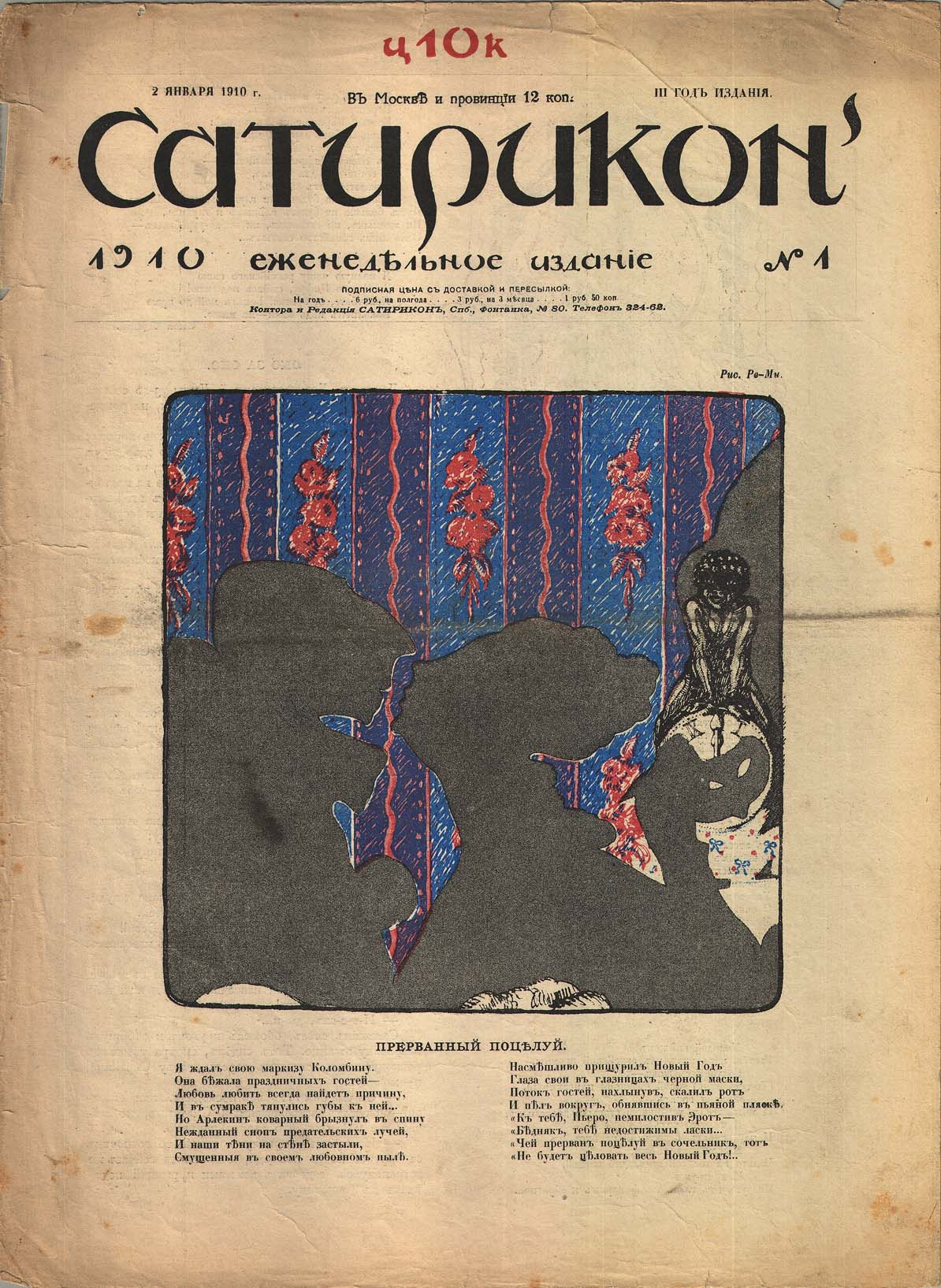
- Cover page dated January 1910
- Categories: Satirical magazine
- Frequency: Weekly
- Founded: 1908
- Final issue: August 1918
- Country: Russian Empire; Russian Republic; Soviet Russia
- Based in: Saint Petersburg
- Language: Russian

Novyi Satirikon was a Russian language weekly humor and satirical magazine that was published in Saint Petersburg in the period 1908–1914. During the 1917 Revolution, the magazine held an anti-Bolshevik political stance, and most of its contributors had to flee Russia after the magazine was closed in 1918.

== History and profile ==
The magazine was started with the title Satirikon in 1908. It was published on a weekly basis. Due to financial problems between the publisher and the editors some editors left the magazine and started a new magazine in 1913 which was named Novyi Satirikon (New Satirikon). Other editors continued Satirikon until spring 1914 when it folded.

Novyi Satirikon targeted the liberal democratic intelligentsia and were read by high school and university students, deputies in the State Duma, ministers and senators in the State Council. During World War I Novyi Satirikon of which editor-in-chief was Arkady Averchenko published nationalist and patriotic materials and adopted an anti-German political stance. The magazine welcomed the February Revolution as "freedom" and published cartoons on the Tsar Nicholas II.

From 1913 Vladimir Lebedev began to work as a caricaturist for the magazine. Writers Teffi, Vladimir Mayakovsky and Sasha Chorny were among the major contributors of the magazine. At the beginning of the Communist revolution in 1917 the magazine advocated a radical anti-Bolshevik approach which became much more intense following the Bolshevik rule. The satire adopted by Novyi Satirikon was extensively ironic and sarcastic during that period.

Novyi Satirikon survived the press decree issued by the Communist government led by Vladimir Lenin and was published until August 1918 (issue 24) when it was censored and then, shut down by the government because of its anti-Bolshevik views.

== Legacy ==
Exiled contributors of the magazine revived the satirical magazine in Paris in 1931. In 1951, a group of Soviet dissidents started a new satirical magazine also named Satirikon in Frankfurt-am-Main. Another magazine with the same name was also launched in Moscow in 1997. All these publications existed for a short period.

== Gallery ==
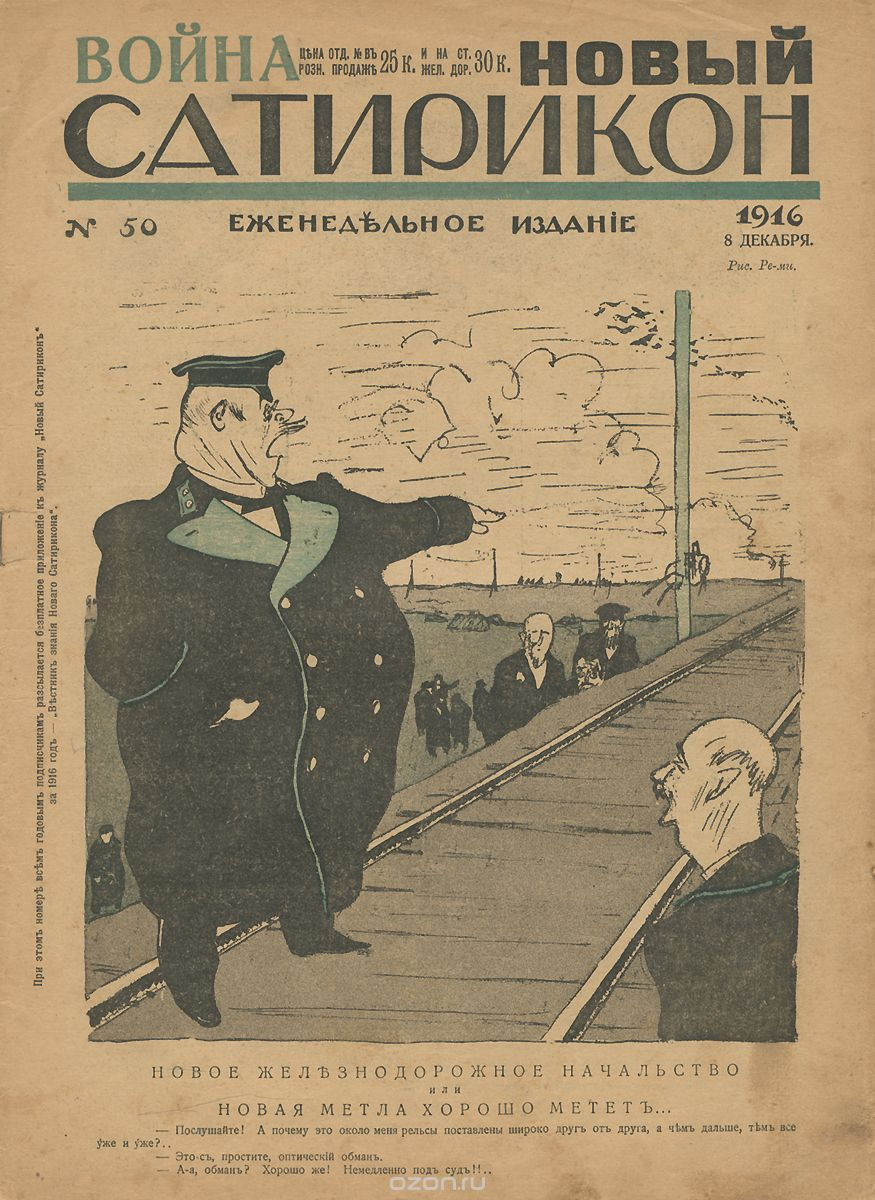
Cover from 1916

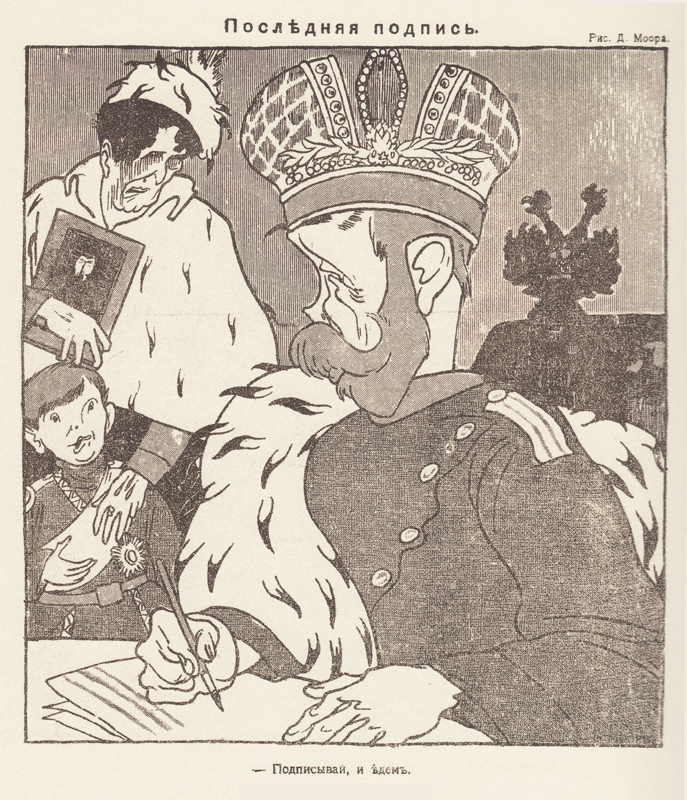
A cartoon on Nicholas II (1917) by Dmitry Moor

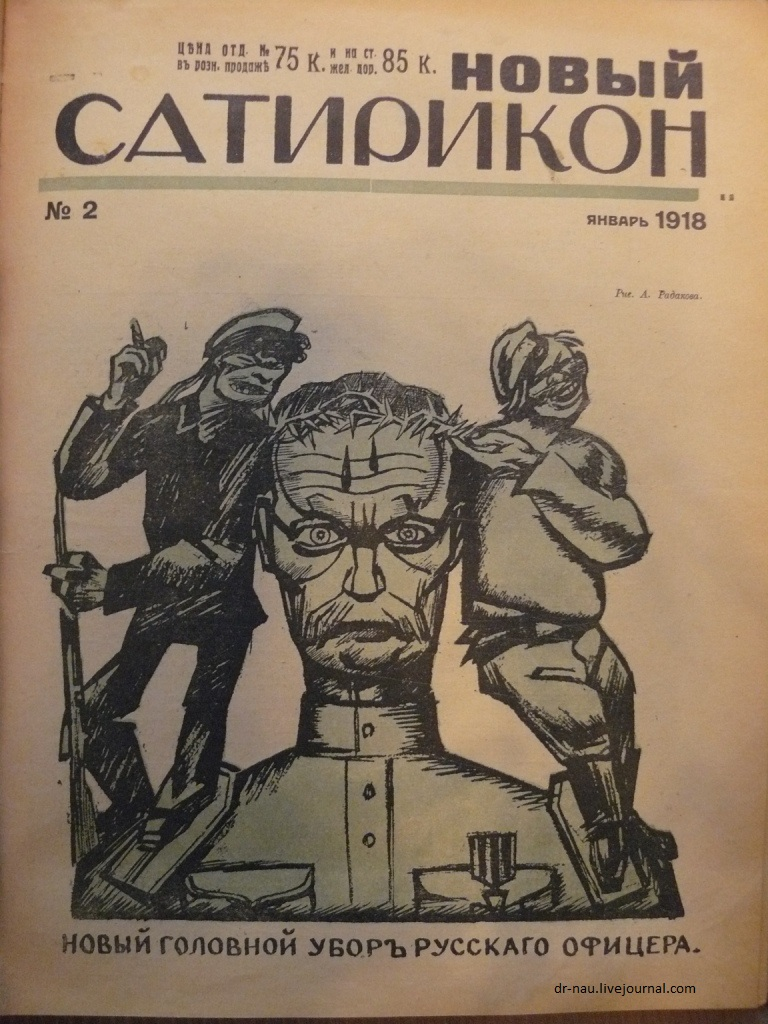
Cover from 1918

Cover from 1918 with a cartoon on Leon Trotsky

== See also ==
- Zhupel
