= Raymond Delatouche =

French farmer and historian (1906–2002)

Raymond Delatouche (1906–2002) was a French farmer and historian.
