= Yellow Expedition =

French trans-Asian expedition

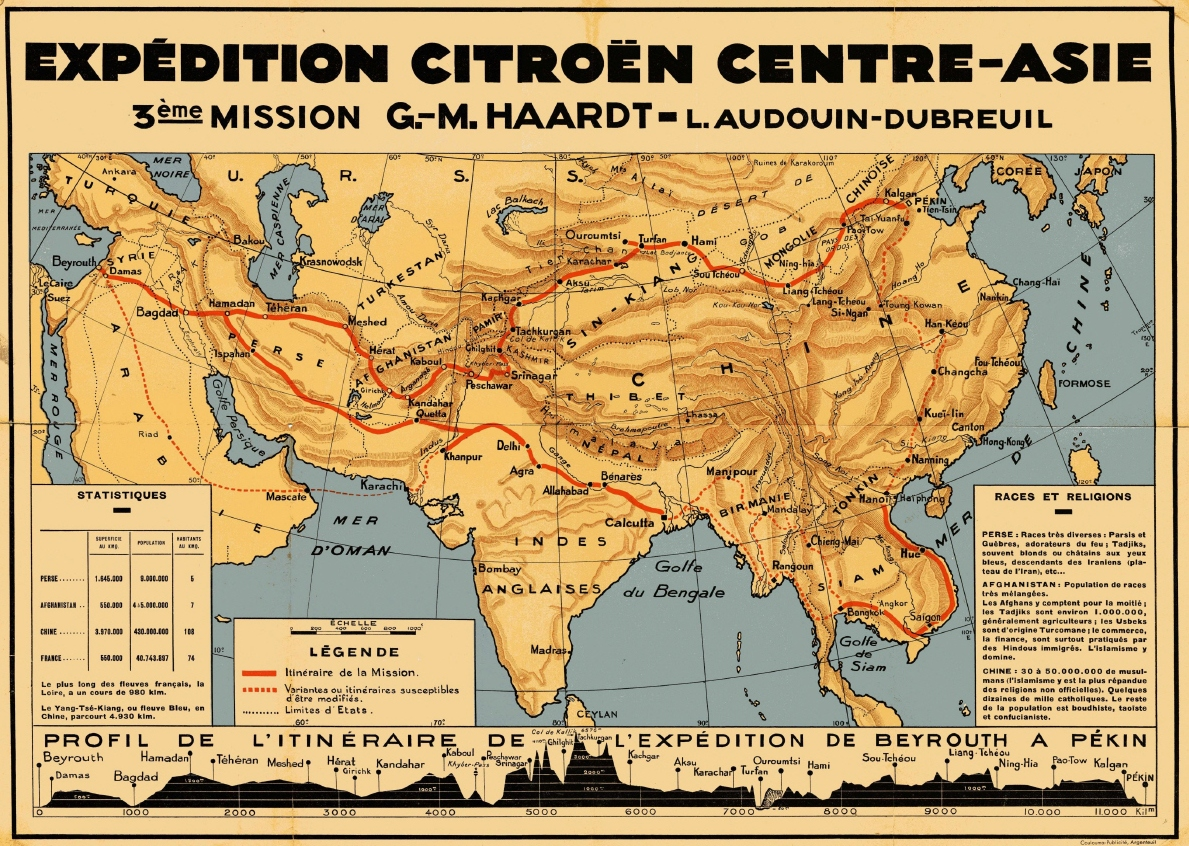
Originally planned routes of the expedition

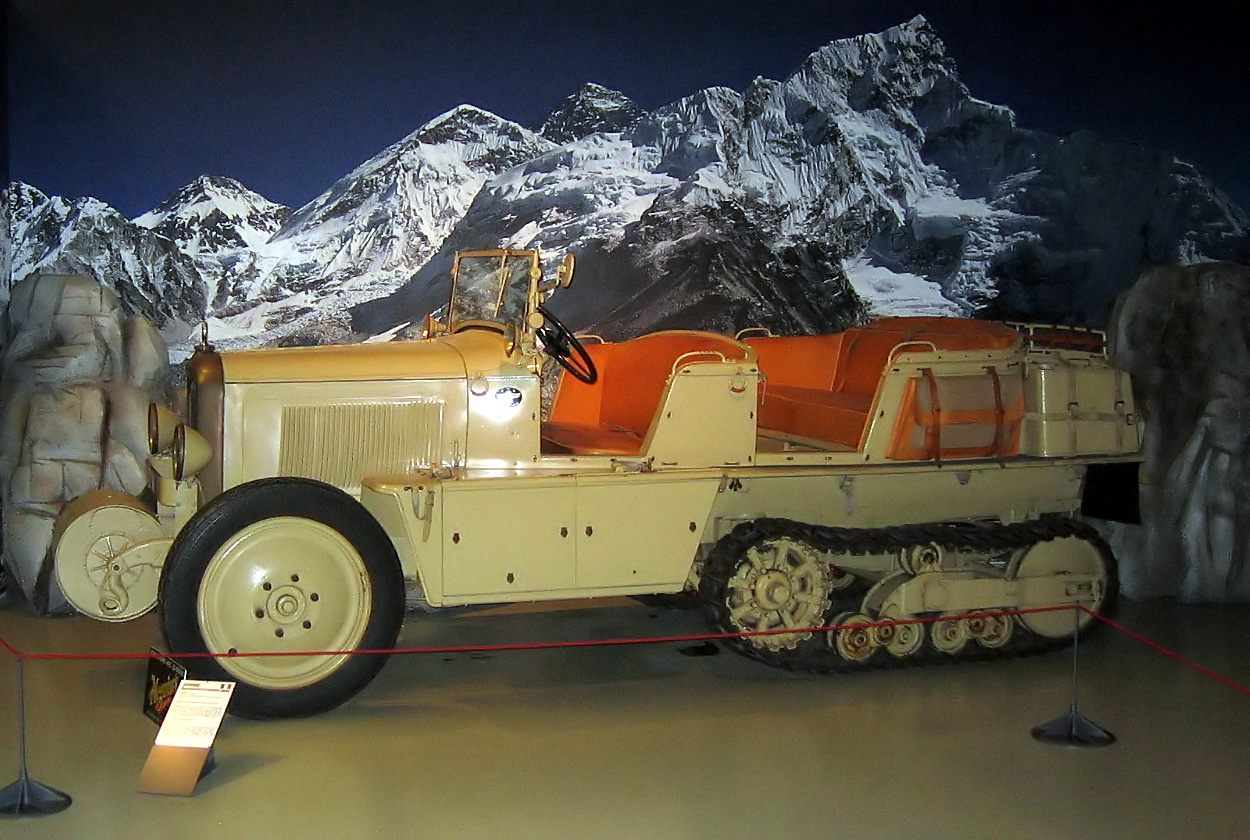
Kégresse track vehicles of the expedition

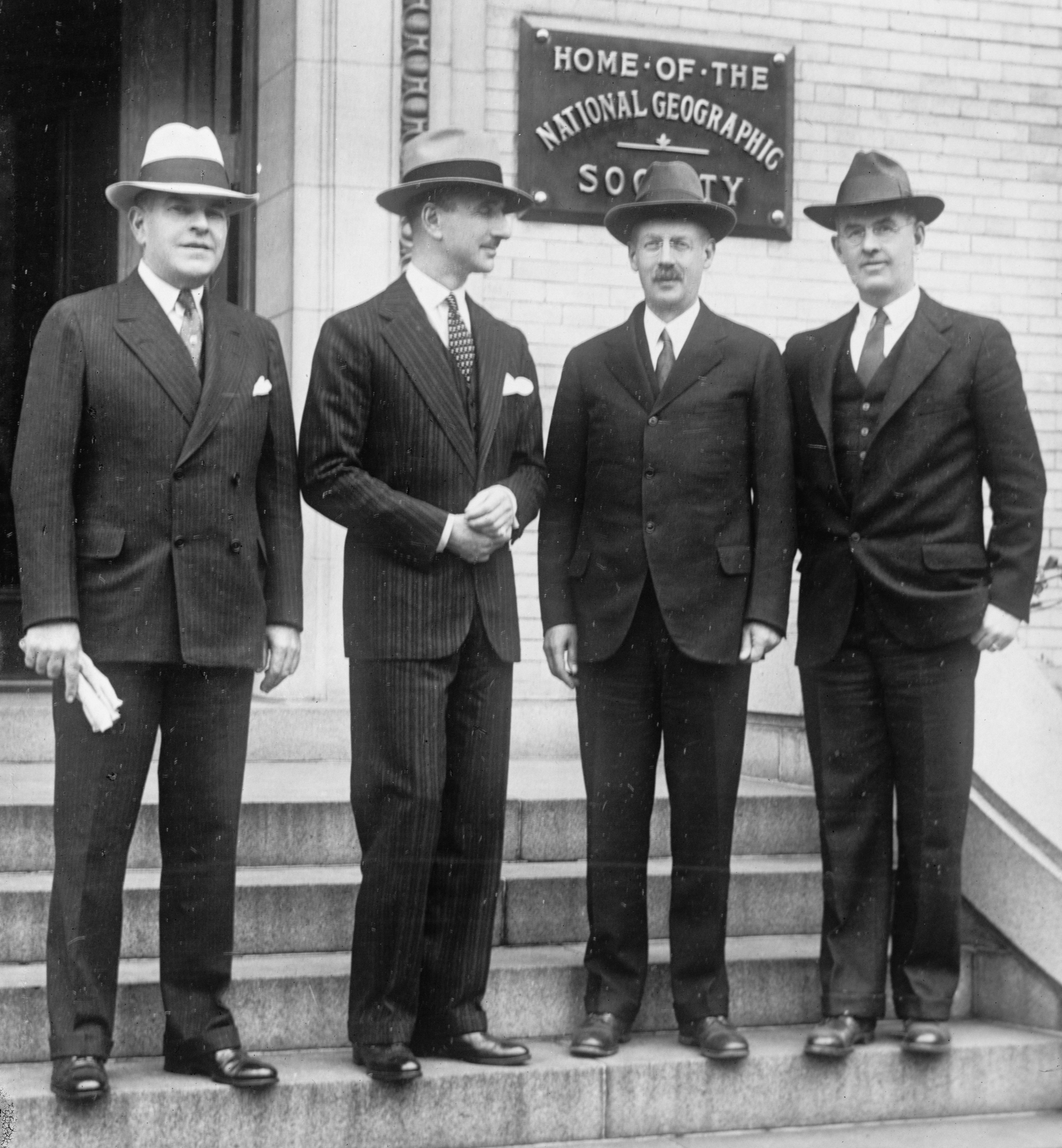
Discussing the planned expedition in December 1930: John Oliver La Gorce (vice-president of the National Geographic Society), Georges-Marie Haardt (organizer and participant in the expedition), Gilbert Hovey Grosvenor (President of the National Geographic Society) and Maynard Owen Williams (American journalist and part-time participant in the expedition).

The Yellow Expedition (French: Croisière Jaune) was a French trans-Asian expedition in 1931 and 1932. It was organised by Citroën in order to promote its P17 Kégresse track vehicles. The expedition started in Beirut, the capital of French Lebanon, and Beijing, the capital of China. One group travelled westward, the other eastward and both met along the route, where the eastbound group turned back allowing both groups to travel to Beijing along a different route. Georges-Marie Haardt and Louis Audouin-Dubreuil led the cruise. Haardt had already made the first motorised crossing of the Sahara and led the Black Expedition right across Africa.

One group of the expedition travelled eastwards through the French Lebanon, French Syria, Kingdom of Iraq under British administration, Persia, Afghanistan, British India until the border of Xinjiang, then a de facto independent region of China under control of the warlord Jin Shuren. Another group travelled westwards across China from Beijing to Urumchi, where they were held hostage by Jin Shuren's troops for several weeks.

The French archeologist Joseph Hackin, the Russian-French painter Alexandre Jacovleff (as an "artistic adviser"), the French philosopher Pierre Teilhard de Chardin and the American photographer Maynard Owen Williams participated in the expedition.

Early 1932, the expedition reached the East China Sea. In British Hong Kong, Haardt died of pneumonia and the expedition was aborted.

In 1934, a feature-length documentary of the expedition, "La Croisière jaune" (English title "An Eastern Odyssey") was released, directed by André Sauvage then Léon Poirier and with cinematography by Georges Specht, all three of whom had gone on the Expedition. Claude Delvincourt composed the music for this film.

In the early 1970s, a French-West German co-produced drama depicting the expedition was filmed. During shoots in Turkey, British actor Roger Delgado died. Nevertheless, filming continued. The series aired in France in 1974 and in West Germany in 1975.

== Literature ==
- Ariane Audouin-Dubreuil: La Croisière jaune: Sur la route de la soie, Grenoble 2013. ISBN 2-7234-3955-0.
- M.-P. Bossard: Quer durch Asien über die alte Seidenstraße, Stuttgart/Zürich 1967. ISBN 2-901795-39-0.
- André Citroën/Fabien Sabates/Camille Cravan/Eric Baschet (eds.): Die Gelbe Expedition Beirut-Peking 1931–1932: Eine historische Foto-Reportage, Kehl am Rhein 1979. ISBN 3-88230-201-1.
- Georges Le Fèvre: La croisière jaune : expédition Citroën Centre-Asie Haardt, Paris 1991. ISBN 2-901795-39-0.
- Georges Le Fèvre: An Eastern Odyssey: The Third Expedition of Haardt and Audouin-Dubreuil, London, 1935. Translated by Major-General Ernest Swinton with a preface by André Citroën.
