= Georges Pernoud =

French journalist (1947–2021)

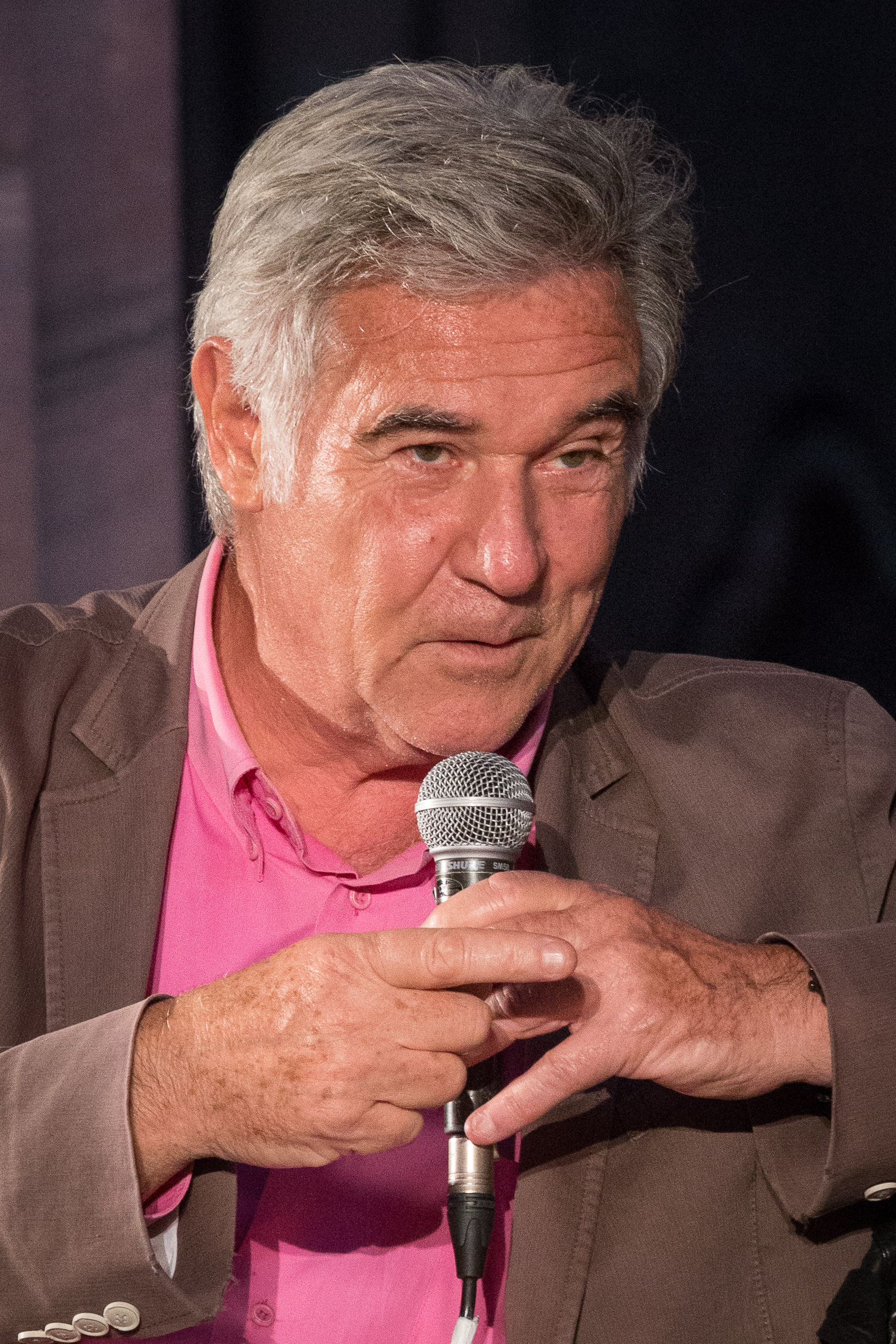
- Born: Georges Alexis Denis Marie Pernoud; 11 August 1947; Rabat, Morocco
- Died: 10 January 2021 (aged 73); Plaisir, France
- Occupations: Journalist, television presenter, television producer
- Years active: 1968–2021
- Notable credit: Thalassa (1980–2017)
- Television: FR3 (1975–1992); France 3 (1992–2017)
- Relatives: Régine Pernoud (aunt)

Georges Alexis Denis Marie Pernoud (Note: French pronunciation: [ʒɔʁʒ pɛʁnu]) (11 August 1947 – 10 January 2021) was a French journalist, television presenter and television producer. He is best known for presenting the docuseries Thalassa from 1980 to 2017.

== Life and career ==
=== Family and personal life ===
Georges Pernoud was born on 11 April 1947 in Rabat, during the second French colonial empire, and more precisely in the French Protectorate in Morocco. His full name is Georges Alexis Denis Marie Pernoud, and he signed his first publications under the name of "Georges Alexis Pernoud".

He was from a journalist's family, by his father René and his uncle Georges. His aunts are the historian Régine Pernoud and the literature director Laurence Pernoud.

He married Monique in 1973, with whom he had two daughters, Fanny (born in 1975) and Julie (born in 1978).

=== Early career ===
Georges Pernoud began his career as a camera operator at the ORTF in 1968. He participated at two expeditions of Haroun Tazieff in Congo at the volcanic crater of Nyiragongo and in Ethiopia on the plain of Dallol. In 1973, his participation at the nautic race of Whitbread between Portsmouth and Cape Town revealed his passion for the sea and later the publication of his first book. It was during this race that Dominique Guillet, a young sailor from Angers, disappeared in the sea during the second step, taken by a breaker. Georges Pernoud made his very first appearance on television on 25 November 1973 in the daily news on the second channel of the ORTF titled 24 heures sur la Une.

=== Thalassa ===
Georges Pernoud proposed on 4 June 1975 the project for Thalassa, a weekly documentary dedicated to the sea, which was accepted two days later. The first episode of thirty minutes was recorded in Marseille and broadcast on 27 September 1975 on FR3, first on voice-over. He then became the presenter of Thalassa on 4 January 1980. The program was a success and was broadcast since 1989 on prime time every week, after having started every month.

Since February 1990, he created and produced the documentary program Faut pas rêver dedicated to discovery of the world, as well as other documentaries for France 3. From 1999 to 2015, he was the president of the thematic channel Planète+ Thalassa. With Thalassa, he is the French presenter having had the longest period at the head of a television program from 1980 to 2017 having presented 1,704 episodes.

Unsatisfied of the more and more erratic broadcast of Thalassa and weakened by health problems, he announced his departure of the program on 21 April 2017 and made his last appearance on 30 June 2017 in an episode that was entirely dedicated to him. Fanny Agostini succeeded him.

=== Death ===
Georges Pernoud died on 10 January 2021 of Alzheimer's disease in a hospital of the Parisian region.

== Honours ==
=== Decorations ===
- Chevalier of the Legion of Honour (2012)
- Chevalier of the Ordre du Mérite Maritime
- Officier of the Ordre des Arts et des Lettres (2011)

=== Medals ===
- Grande Médaille d'Or des Explorations of the Société de Géographie (1999)
- Medal from the town of Saint-Malo (2017)

=== Prizes ===
- Prize Roland-Dorgelès (2005)
- 7 d'Or for the program Thalassa (1986, 1990, 1991, 1997)

== Publications ==
- Georges Alexis Pernoud (1974). Fernand Nathan (ed.). Une équipe, un bateau : 13 000 kilomètres dans la course autour du monde à bord du "33 export" (in French). p. 170.
- Julia Ferloni; Georges Pernoud (2005). Éditions de Conti (ed.). Lapérouse : Voyage autour du monde (in French). Ed. de Conti. p. 127. ISBN 978-2351030004.
- Georges Pernoud; Erik Orsenna (2015). Carnets Nord (ed.). Bon vent ! (in French). Carnets Nord. p. 304. ISBN 978-2355361760.
- Chantal Loiselet; Patrick Deschamps; Georges Pernoud (2015). Glénat Editions (ed.). Démerdez-vous pour être heureux ! (in French). Glénat. p. 240. ISBN 978-2723483001.

== See also ==
- Thalassa (TV series)
- France 3
