= Equatorial Africa =

Ambiguous term for part of Africa near the equator

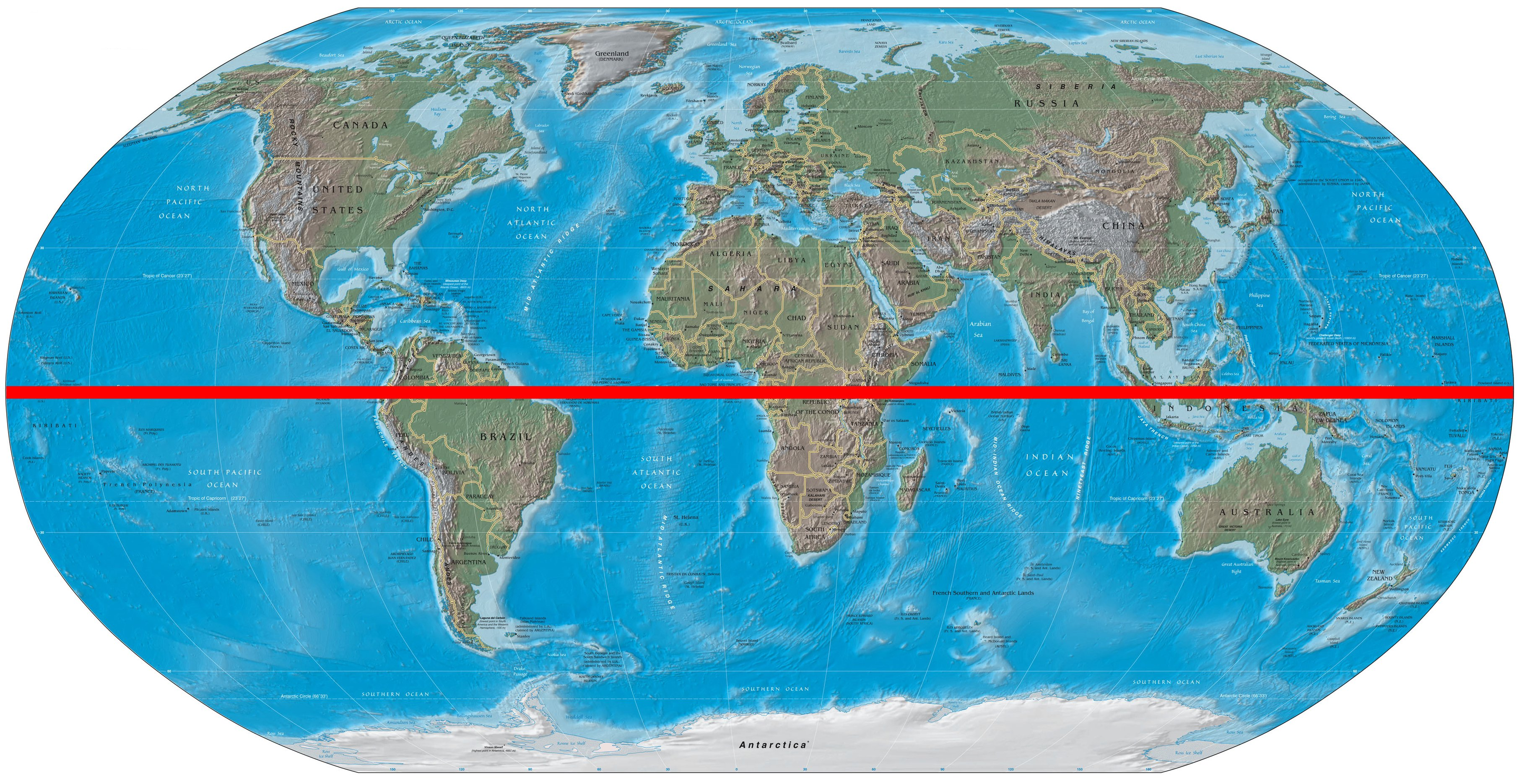
Global map showing location of the Equator

Equatorial Africa is an ambiguous term that is sometimes used to refer to the equatorial region of sub-Saharan Africa traversed by the Equator, more broadly to tropical Africa, or in a biological and geo-environmental sense to the intra-tropical African rainforest region.

== See also ==
- Central Africa
- French Equatorial Africa
- Sahara
- Sahel
- Sudan (region)
- Tropics
