= Thalassa (TV series) =

France 3 documentary TV series

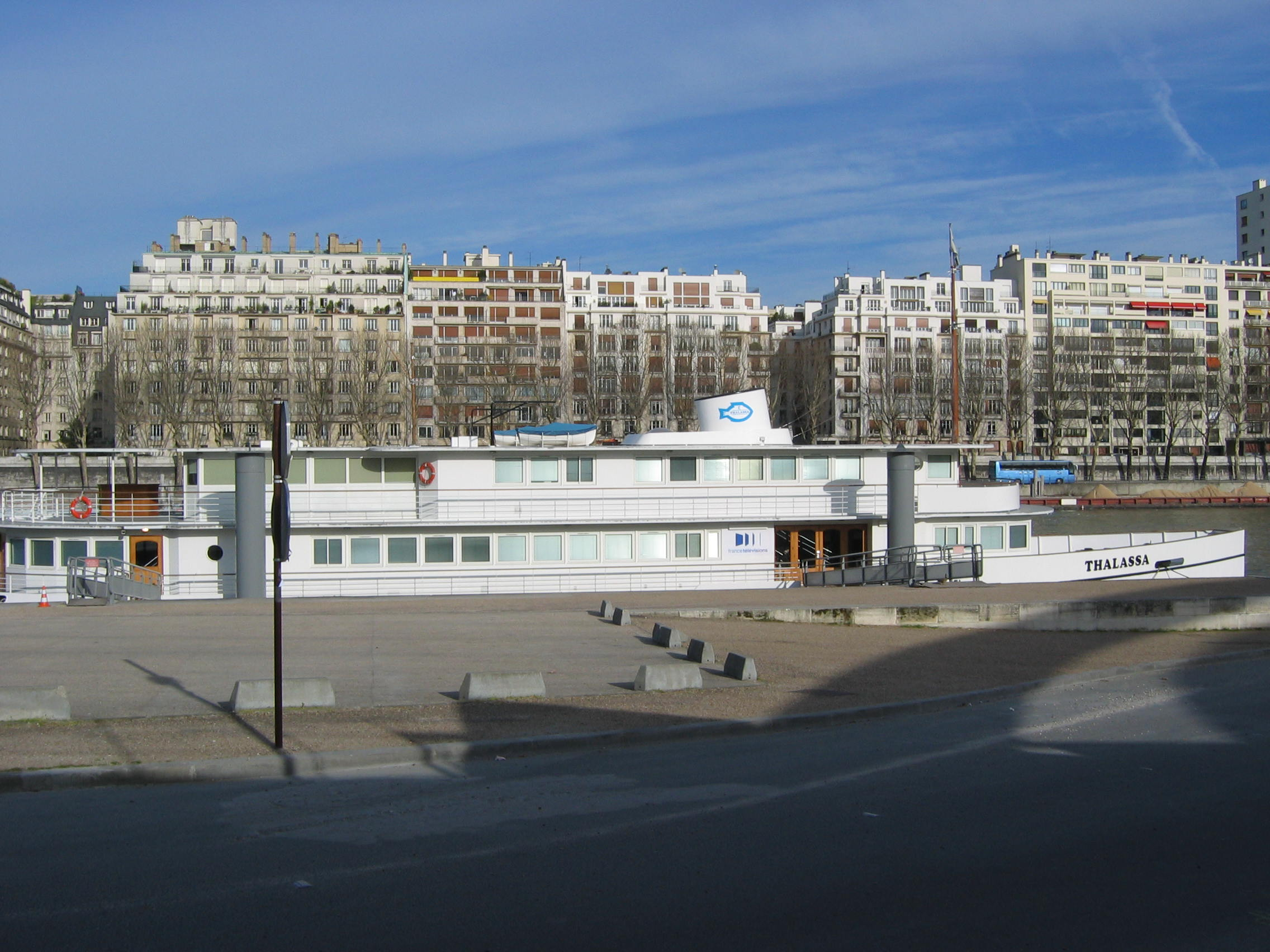
- The show's boat-studio on the quays in Paris
- Genre: Documentary
- Presented by: Fanny Agostini (2017-); Georges Pernoud (1980-2017)
- Country of origin: France
- Original language: French

Production
- Running time: 90 minutes

Original release
- Network: France 3
- Release: 27 September 1975 – present

Thalassa is a French documentary television series, broadcast for many years on Friday at 8:50 pm on France 3 and presented by Georges Pernoud.

In 2017, Pernoud announced his departure from Thalassa. From 2 October 2017, Fanny Agostini presented the show, once a month on a Monday at 8:55 pm, alternating with other discovery programs, including Faut pas rêver, another show created by Pernoud.

Thalassa is produced by France Télévisions. The show is also broadcast on TV5 Monde and is subtitled in six languages, including English.

It is entirely focused on the sea (θάλασσα, thálassa in Ancient and Modern Greek) – geography, ecology, fishing, transportation, and yachting.

It is one of the oldest French TV series still running (together with Des chiffres et des lettres). It started on 27 September 1975 and is still one of the most prominent TV programs in France.

== See also ==
- Thalassa (mythology), Greek sea goddess which means "sea"
