= List of minor planets: 28001–29000 =

The following is a partial list of minor planets, running from minor-planet number 28001 through 29000, inclusive. The primary data for this and other partial lists is based on JPL's "Small-Body Orbital Elements" and data available from the Minor Planet Center. Critical list information is also provided by the MPC, unless otherwise specified from Lowell Observatory. A detailed description of the table's columns and additional sources are given on the main page including a complete list of every page in this series, and a statistical break-up on the dynamical classification of minor planets.

Also see the summary list of all named bodies in numerical and alphabetical order, and the corresponding naming citations for the number range of this particular list. New namings may only be added to this list after official publication, as the preannouncement of names is condemned by the Working Group for Small Bodies Nomenclature of the International Astronomical Union.

Near-Earth obj.	MBA (inner)	MBA (outer)	Centaur
Mars-crosser	MBA (middle)	Jupiter trojan	Trans-Neptunian obj.
Unclassified

== 28001–28100 ==
Designation			Discovery			Properties		Ref
Permanent	Provisional	Named after	Date	Site	Discoverer(s)	Category	Diam.	Ref
28001	1997 WD_{41}	—	November 29, 1997	Socorro	LINEAR	EOS	6.7 km	MPC · JPL
28002	1997 WO_{51}	—	November 29, 1997	Socorro	LINEAR	HYG · slow	9.3 km	MPC · JPL
28003	1997 WT_{52}	—	November 29, 1997	Socorro	LINEAR	EOS	7.8 km	MPC · JPL
28004 Terakawa	1997 XA	Terakawa	December 2, 1997	Mishima	M. Akiyama	·	6.0 km	MPC · JPL
28005	1997 XC	—	December 1, 1997	Lime Creek	R. Linderholm	·	15 km	MPC · JPL
28006	1997 XM_{5}	—	December 3, 1997	Gekko	T. Kagawa, T. Urata	·	5.8 km	MPC · JPL
28007 Galhassin	1997 XO_{10}	Galhassin	December 7, 1997	Cima Ekar	A. Boattini, M. Tombelli	·	7.1 km	MPC · JPL
28008	1997 XR_{11}	—	December 5, 1997	Nachi-Katsuura	Y. Shimizu, T. Urata	·	6.8 km	MPC · JPL
28009	1997 YY_{1}	—	December 21, 1997	Oizumi	T. Kobayashi	·	5.9 km	MPC · JPL
28010	1997 YE_{3}	—	December 24, 1997	Oizumi	T. Kobayashi	slow	6.4 km	MPC · JPL
28011	1997 YW_{3}	—	December 22, 1997	Xinglong	SCAP	·	5.0 km	MPC · JPL
28012	1997 YH_{4}	—	December 23, 1997	Xinglong	SCAP	KOR	4.1 km	MPC · JPL
28013	1997 YL_{4}	—	December 24, 1997	Xinglong	SCAP	(5)	4.7 km	MPC · JPL
28014	1997 YS_{5}	—	December 25, 1997	Oizumi	T. Kobayashi	·	9.1 km	MPC · JPL
28015	1997 YG_{9}	—	December 26, 1997	Church Stretton	S. P. Laurie	KOR	4.5 km	MPC · JPL
28016	1997 YV_{11}	—	December 30, 1997	Oizumi	T. Kobayashi	URS · slow ·	17 km	MPC · JPL
28017	1997 YV_{13}	—	December 31, 1997	Oizumi	T. Kobayashi	·	6.0 km	MPC · JPL
28018	1998 AG	—	January 4, 1998	Xinglong	SCAP	EOS	8.3 km	MPC · JPL
28019 Warchal	1998 AW_{8}	Warchal	January 14, 1998	Ondřejov	L. Kotková	·	2.2 km	MPC · JPL
28020	1998 BP_{5}	—	January 22, 1998	Kitt Peak	Spacewatch	V	2.4 km	MPC · JPL
28021	1998 BP_{6}	—	January 22, 1998	Bédoin	P. Antonini	·	9.7 km	MPC · JPL
28022	1998 BA_{9}	—	January 25, 1998	Haleakala	NEAT	VER	14 km	MPC · JPL
28023	1998 BF_{11}	—	January 23, 1998	Socorro	LINEAR	EOS · slow	5.9 km	MPC · JPL
28024	1998 BT_{14}	—	January 25, 1998	Nachi-Katsuura	Y. Shimizu, T. Urata	EOS	11 km	MPC · JPL
28025	1998 BD_{41}	—	January 25, 1998	Haleakala	NEAT	·	3.8 km	MPC · JPL
28026	1998 CN_{1}	—	February 6, 1998	Xinglong	SCAP	NEM	9.5 km	MPC · JPL
28027	1998 CC_{5}	—	February 6, 1998	La Silla	E. W. Elst	·	4.3 km	MPC · JPL
28028	1998 DS_{8}	—	February 22, 1998	Xinglong	SCAP	KOR	5.7 km	MPC · JPL
28029	1998 DW_{9}	—	February 20, 1998	Woomera	F. B. Zoltowski	CYB	16 km	MPC · JPL
28030	1998 DW_{12}	—	February 26, 1998	Kleť	Kleť	·	8.4 km	MPC · JPL
28031	1998 DX_{17}	—	February 23, 1998	Kitt Peak	Spacewatch	·	3.7 km	MPC · JPL
28032	1998 DZ_{23}	—	February 17, 1998	Nachi-Katsuura	Y. Shimizu, T. Urata	·	8.5 km	MPC · JPL
28033	1998 EE_{9}	—	March 5, 1998	Xinglong	SCAP	EOS	5.8 km	MPC · JPL
28034	1998 EU_{13}	—	March 1, 1998	La Silla	E. W. Elst	MRX	4.1 km	MPC · JPL
28035	1998 FY_{1}	—	March 21, 1998	Kitt Peak	Spacewatch	·	2.0 km	MPC · JPL
28036	1998 FZ_{26}	—	March 20, 1998	Socorro	LINEAR	EOS	9.6 km	MPC · JPL
28037 Williammonts	1998 FS_{33}	Williammonts	March 20, 1998	Socorro	LINEAR	·	4.8 km	MPC · JPL
28038 Nicoleodzer	1998 FK_{35}	Nicoleodzer	March 20, 1998	Socorro	LINEAR	NYS	2.3 km	MPC · JPL
28039 Mauraoei	1998 FV_{78}	Mauraoei	March 24, 1998	Socorro	LINEAR	·	3.8 km	MPC · JPL
28040	1998 FF_{80}	—	March 24, 1998	Socorro	LINEAR	HYG	7.5 km	MPC · JPL
28041	1998 FQ_{87}	—	March 24, 1998	Socorro	LINEAR	·	16 km	MPC · JPL
28042 Mayapatel	1998 FB_{90}	Mayapatel	March 24, 1998	Socorro	LINEAR	·	2.3 km	MPC · JPL
28043 Mabelwheeler	1998 FX_{90}	Mabelwheeler	March 24, 1998	Socorro	LINEAR	·	3.0 km	MPC · JPL
28044	1998 FD_{116}	—	March 31, 1998	Socorro	LINEAR	V	3.6 km	MPC · JPL
28045 Johnwilkins	1998 FB_{118}	Johnwilkins	March 31, 1998	Socorro	LINEAR	·	2.7 km	MPC · JPL
28046	1998 HB_{14}	—	April 24, 1998	Haleakala	NEAT	·	5.5 km	MPC · JPL
28047	1998 HU_{90}	—	April 21, 1998	Socorro	LINEAR	·	2.7 km	MPC · JPL
28048 Camilleyoke	1998 HH_{91}	Camilleyoke	April 21, 1998	Socorro	LINEAR	·	2.5 km	MPC · JPL
28049 Yvonnealex	1998 HM_{94}	Yvonnealex	April 21, 1998	Socorro	LINEAR	·	3.4 km	MPC · JPL
28050 Asekomeh	1998 HC_{99}	Asekomeh	April 21, 1998	Socorro	LINEAR	·	2.9 km	MPC · JPL
28051 Bruzzone	1998 HS_{153}	Bruzzone	April 25, 1998	Anderson Mesa	LONEOS	KOR	3.9 km	MPC · JPL
28052 Lowellputnam	1998 KP_{1}	Lowellputnam	May 18, 1998	Anderson Mesa	LONEOS	·	3.0 km	MPC · JPL
28053 Kimberlyputnam	1998 KE_{4}	Kimberlyputnam	May 22, 1998	Anderson Mesa	LONEOS	·	7.9 km	MPC · JPL
28054	1998 KE_{50}	—	May 23, 1998	Socorro	LINEAR	·	6.0 km	MPC · JPL
28055	1998 MX	—	June 16, 1998	Socorro	LINEAR	EUN	4.3 km	MPC · JPL
28056	1998 MK_{5}	—	June 20, 1998	Kitt Peak	Spacewatch	EUN	7.7 km	MPC · JPL
28057 Hollars	1998 MM_{37}	Hollars	June 24, 1998	Anderson Mesa	LONEOS	EOS	7.1 km	MPC · JPL
28058	1998 NF	—	July 1, 1998	Reedy Creek	J. Broughton	NYS	2.8 km	MPC · JPL
28059 Kiliaan	1998 OZ_{7}	Kiliaan	July 26, 1998	La Silla	E. W. Elst	·	8.6 km	MPC · JPL
28060	1998 OL_{8}	—	July 26, 1998	La Silla	E. W. Elst	·	13 km	MPC · JPL
28061	1998 ON_{11}	—	July 26, 1998	La Silla	E. W. Elst	KOR	5.8 km	MPC · JPL
28062	1998 OZ_{11}	—	July 22, 1998	Reedy Creek	J. Broughton	·	2.1 km	MPC · JPL
28063	1998 OR_{14}	—	July 26, 1998	La Silla	E. W. Elst	·	3.7 km	MPC · JPL
28064	1998 QX_{10}	—	August 17, 1998	Socorro	LINEAR	EOS	10 km	MPC · JPL
28065	1998 QZ_{10}	—	August 17, 1998	Socorro	LINEAR	NYS	6.1 km	MPC · JPL
28066	1998 QA_{11}	—	August 17, 1998	Socorro	LINEAR	·	3.6 km	MPC · JPL
28067	1998 QA_{14}	—	August 17, 1998	Socorro	LINEAR	EUN	5.4 km	MPC · JPL
28068 Stephbillings	1998 QO_{21}	Stephbillings	August 17, 1998	Socorro	LINEAR	·	2.3 km	MPC · JPL
28069	1998 QQ_{22}	—	August 17, 1998	Socorro	LINEAR	·	3.8 km	MPC · JPL
28070	1998 QS_{25}	—	August 17, 1998	Socorro	LINEAR	·	4.8 km	MPC · JPL
28071	1998 QC_{26}	—	August 25, 1998	Višnjan Observatory	Višnjan	·	4.7 km	MPC · JPL
28072 Lindbowerman	1998 QT_{31}	Lindbowerman	August 17, 1998	Socorro	LINEAR	NYS	4.3 km	MPC · JPL
28073 Fohner	1998 QT_{40}	Fohner	August 17, 1998	Socorro	LINEAR	slow	3.7 km	MPC · JPL
28074 Matgallagher	1998 QM_{41}	Matgallagher	August 17, 1998	Socorro	LINEAR	·	4.2 km	MPC · JPL
28075 Emilyhoffman	1998 QU_{44}	Emilyhoffman	August 17, 1998	Socorro	LINEAR	·	4.2 km	MPC · JPL
28076	1998 QS_{48}	—	August 17, 1998	Socorro	LINEAR	·	2.3 km	MPC · JPL
28077 Hard	1998 QH_{55}	Hard	August 27, 1998	Anderson Mesa	LONEOS	·	2.2 km	MPC · JPL
28078 Mauricehilleman	1998 QM_{55}	Mauricehilleman	August 26, 1998	Caussols	ODAS	·	2.5 km	MPC · JPL
28079	1998 QY_{63}	—	August 24, 1998	Socorro	LINEAR	·	17 km	MPC · JPL
28080	1998 QS_{72}	—	August 24, 1998	Socorro	LINEAR	·	3.1 km	MPC · JPL
28081 Carriehudson	1998 QN_{80}	Carriehudson	August 24, 1998	Socorro	LINEAR	·	2.4 km	MPC · JPL
28082	1998 QF_{88}	—	August 24, 1998	Socorro	LINEAR	EUN	5.3 km	MPC · JPL
28083	1998 QP_{90}	—	August 28, 1998	Socorro	LINEAR	·	3.6 km	MPC · JPL
28084	1998 QH_{92}	—	August 28, 1998	Socorro	LINEAR	·	2.4 km	MPC · JPL
28085	1998 QO_{98}	—	August 28, 1998	Socorro	LINEAR	·	3.4 km	MPC · JPL
28086	1998 QW_{100}	—	August 26, 1998	La Silla	E. W. Elst	·	6.7 km	MPC · JPL
28087	1998 QH_{101}	—	August 26, 1998	La Silla	E. W. Elst	·	2.5 km	MPC · JPL
28088	1998 RQ_{2}	—	September 14, 1998	Socorro	LINEAR	·	2.8 km	MPC · JPL
28089	1998 RD_{17}	—	September 14, 1998	Socorro	LINEAR	·	6.7 km	MPC · JPL
28090	1998 RW_{32}	—	September 14, 1998	Socorro	LINEAR	·	1.4 km	MPC · JPL
28091 Mikekane	1998 RQ_{49}	Mikekane	September 14, 1998	Socorro	LINEAR	·	2.5 km	MPC · JPL
28092 Joannekear	1998 RT_{53}	Joannekear	September 14, 1998	Socorro	LINEAR	·	2.0 km	MPC · JPL
28093 Staceylevoit	1998 RG_{54}	Staceylevoit	September 14, 1998	Socorro	LINEAR	·	3.4 km	MPC · JPL
28094 Michellewis	1998 RE_{56}	Michellewis	September 14, 1998	Socorro	LINEAR	·	2.9 km	MPC · JPL
28095 Seanmahoney	1998 RA_{57}	Seanmahoney	September 14, 1998	Socorro	LINEAR	·	2.3 km	MPC · JPL
28096 Kathrynmarsh	1998 RS_{59}	Kathrynmarsh	September 14, 1998	Socorro	LINEAR	·	2.1 km	MPC · JPL
28097	1998 RZ_{63}	—	September 14, 1998	Socorro	LINEAR	KOR	3.5 km	MPC · JPL
28098	1998 RJ_{64}	—	September 14, 1998	Socorro	LINEAR	NYS	3.8 km	MPC · JPL
28099	1998 RZ_{66}	—	September 14, 1998	Socorro	LINEAR	·	9.8 km	MPC · JPL
28100	1998 RG_{69}	—	September 14, 1998	Socorro	LINEAR	·	4.3 km	MPC · JPL

== 28101–28200 ==
back to top

Designation			Discovery			Properties		Ref
Permanent	Provisional	Named after	Date	Site	Discoverer(s)	Category	Diam.	Ref
28101	1998 RP_{71}	—	September 14, 1998	Socorro	LINEAR	·	2.2 km	MPC · JPL
28102	1998 RM_{79}	—	September 14, 1998	Socorro	LINEAR	·	1.8 km	MPC · JPL
28103 Benmcpheron	1998 RK_{80}	Benmcpheron	September 14, 1998	Socorro	LINEAR	·	2.4 km	MPC · JPL
28104	1998 SL_{1}	—	September 16, 1998	Caussols	ODAS	·	1.7 km	MPC · JPL
28105 Santallo	1998 SC_{4}	Santallo	September 18, 1998	Caussols	ODAS	ADE	6.7 km	MPC · JPL
28106	1998 SE_{10}	—	September 16, 1998	Caussols	ODAS	·	2.5 km	MPC · JPL
28107 Sapar	1998 SA_{13}	Sapar	September 22, 1998	Ondřejov	L. Kotková	·	4.5 km	MPC · JPL
28108 Sydneybarnes	1998 SB_{24}	Sydneybarnes	September 17, 1998	Anderson Mesa	LONEOS	·	1.7 km	MPC · JPL
28109	1998 SA_{29}	—	September 18, 1998	Kitt Peak	Spacewatch	THM	8.1 km	MPC · JPL
28110	1998 SG_{30}	—	September 19, 1998	Kitt Peak	Spacewatch	·	3.9 km	MPC · JPL
28111	1998 SY_{31}	—	September 20, 1998	Kitt Peak	Spacewatch	·	2.0 km	MPC · JPL
28112	1998 SN_{37}	—	September 21, 1998	Kitt Peak	Spacewatch	NYS	2.1 km	MPC · JPL
28113	1998 SD_{43}	—	September 23, 1998	Xinglong	SCAP	·	2.7 km	MPC · JPL
28114	1998 SE_{43}	—	September 23, 1998	Xinglong	SCAP	V	3.0 km	MPC · JPL
28115	1998 SN_{50}	—	September 26, 1998	Kitt Peak	Spacewatch	NYS	2.1 km	MPC · JPL
28116 Kunovac	1998 SP_{56}	Kunovac	September 17, 1998	Anderson Mesa	LONEOS	·	11 km	MPC · JPL
28117 Mort	1998 SK_{57}	Mort	September 17, 1998	Anderson Mesa	LONEOS	·	2.7 km	MPC · JPL
28118 Vaux	1998 SR_{57}	Vaux	September 17, 1998	Anderson Mesa	LONEOS	·	2.7 km	MPC · JPL
28119	1998 SX_{71}	—	September 21, 1998	La Silla	E. W. Elst	·	2.4 km	MPC · JPL
28120	1998 SX_{72}	—	September 21, 1998	La Silla	E. W. Elst	(883)	2.2 km	MPC · JPL
28121	1998 SY_{72}	—	September 21, 1998	La Silla	E. W. Elst	·	2.3 km	MPC · JPL
28122	1998 SJ_{74}	—	September 21, 1998	La Silla	E. W. Elst	·	5.6 km	MPC · JPL
28123	1998 SM_{74}	—	September 21, 1998	La Silla	E. W. Elst	NYS	4.9 km	MPC · JPL
28124	1998 SD_{79}	—	September 26, 1998	Socorro	LINEAR	·	4.0 km	MPC · JPL
28125 Juliomiguez	1998 SR_{107}	Juliomiguez	September 26, 1998	Socorro	LINEAR	·	2.7 km	MPC · JPL
28126 Nydegger	1998 SF_{109}	Nydegger	September 26, 1998	Socorro	LINEAR	·	3.1 km	MPC · JPL
28127 Ogden-Stenerson	1998 SL_{110}	Ogden-Stenerson	September 26, 1998	Socorro	LINEAR	·	1.9 km	MPC · JPL
28128 Cynthrossman	1998 ST_{118}	Cynthrossman	September 26, 1998	Socorro	LINEAR	·	2.0 km	MPC · JPL
28129 Teresummers	1998 SF_{121}	Teresummers	September 26, 1998	Socorro	LINEAR	·	3.5 km	MPC · JPL
28130 Troemper	1998 SK_{124}	Troemper	September 26, 1998	Socorro	LINEAR	·	2.5 km	MPC · JPL
28131 Dougwelch	1998 SX_{127}	Dougwelch	September 26, 1998	Socorro	LINEAR	·	2.2 km	MPC · JPL
28132 Karenzobel	1998 SY_{128}	Karenzobel	September 26, 1998	Socorro	LINEAR	·	3.2 km	MPC · JPL
28133 Kylebardwell	1998 SS_{130}	Kylebardwell	September 26, 1998	Socorro	LINEAR	·	3.4 km	MPC · JPL
28134	1998 SB_{131}	—	September 26, 1998	Socorro	LINEAR	·	4.8 km	MPC · JPL
28135	1998 ST_{131}	—	September 26, 1998	Socorro	LINEAR	·	3.2 km	MPC · JPL
28136 Chasegross	1998 SB_{134}	Chasegross	September 26, 1998	Socorro	LINEAR	·	1.9 km	MPC · JPL
28137 Helenyao	1998 SY_{138}	Helenyao	September 26, 1998	Socorro	LINEAR	·	4.7 km	MPC · JPL
28138	1998 SD_{141}	—	September 26, 1998	Socorro	LINEAR	EOS	7.7 km	MPC · JPL
28139	1998 SN_{141}	—	September 26, 1998	Socorro	LINEAR	EOS	5.5 km	MPC · JPL
28140	1998 SR_{144}	—	September 20, 1998	La Silla	E. W. Elst	·	3.3 km	MPC · JPL
28141 ten Brummelaar	1998 TC	ten Brummelaar	October 2, 1998	Anderson Mesa	LONEOS	·	8.0 km	MPC · JPL
28142	1998 TU	—	October 12, 1998	Kitt Peak	Spacewatch	·	1.9 km	MPC · JPL
28143	1998 TK_{5}	—	October 13, 1998	Višnjan Observatory	K. Korlević	V	3.0 km	MPC · JPL
28144	1998 TN_{13}	—	October 13, 1998	Kitt Peak	Spacewatch	·	4.0 km	MPC · JPL
28145	1998 TY_{18}	—	October 14, 1998	Xinglong	SCAP	·	3.2 km	MPC · JPL
28146 Nackard	1998 TC_{32}	Nackard	October 11, 1998	Anderson Mesa	LONEOS	(2076)	4.7 km	MPC · JPL
28147 Colbath	1998 TD_{32}	Colbath	October 11, 1998	Anderson Mesa	LONEOS	·	3.8 km	MPC · JPL
28148 Fuentes	1998 TL_{34}	Fuentes	October 14, 1998	Anderson Mesa	LONEOS	·	2.1 km	MPC · JPL
28149 Arieldaniel	1998 TX_{34}	Arieldaniel	October 14, 1998	Anderson Mesa	LONEOS	·	2.1 km	MPC · JPL
28150	1998 UC_{1}	—	October 17, 1998	Ondřejov	P. Pravec	·	2.8 km	MPC · JPL
28151 Markknopfler	1998 UG_{6}	Markknopfler	October 22, 1998	Caussols	ODAS	·	4.9 km	MPC · JPL
28152	1998 UK_{8}	—	October 24, 1998	Oizumi	T. Kobayashi	·	4.3 km	MPC · JPL
28153	1998 UU_{20}	—	October 29, 1998	Višnjan Observatory	K. Korlević	·	2.2 km	MPC · JPL
28154	1998 UQ_{26}	—	October 18, 1998	La Silla	E. W. Elst	·	10 km	MPC · JPL
28155 Chengzhendai	1998 UB_{40}	Chengzhendai	October 28, 1998	Socorro	LINEAR	·	2.3 km	MPC · JPL
28156 McColl	1998 UF_{41}	McColl	October 28, 1998	Socorro	LINEAR	·	6.4 km	MPC · JPL
28157	1998 VY_{3}	—	November 11, 1998	Caussols	ODAS	·	3.4 km	MPC · JPL
28158	1998 VT_{6}	—	November 12, 1998	Oizumi	T. Kobayashi	·	2.7 km	MPC · JPL
28159 Giuricich	1998 VM_{7}	Giuricich	November 10, 1998	Socorro	LINEAR	·	2.4 km	MPC · JPL
28160	1998 VC_{11}	—	November 10, 1998	Socorro	LINEAR	·	2.6 km	MPC · JPL
28161 Neelpatel	1998 VB_{13}	Neelpatel	November 10, 1998	Socorro	LINEAR	·	1.7 km	MPC · JPL
28162	1998 VD_{14}	—	November 10, 1998	Socorro	LINEAR	·	7.2 km	MPC · JPL
28163 Lorikim	1998 VP_{15}	Lorikim	November 10, 1998	Socorro	LINEAR	·	5.7 km	MPC · JPL
28164	1998 VY_{21}	—	November 10, 1998	Socorro	LINEAR	·	1.9 km	MPC · JPL
28165 Bayanmashat	1998 VC_{25}	Bayanmashat	November 10, 1998	Socorro	LINEAR	·	3.4 km	MPC · JPL
28166	1998 VP_{25}	—	November 10, 1998	Socorro	LINEAR	·	1.5 km	MPC · JPL
28167 Andrewkim	1998 VQ_{25}	Andrewkim	November 10, 1998	Socorro	LINEAR	·	3.6 km	MPC · JPL
28168 Evanolin	1998 VY_{25}	Evanolin	November 10, 1998	Socorro	LINEAR	·	3.7 km	MPC · JPL
28169 Cathconte	1998 VZ_{29}	Cathconte	November 10, 1998	Socorro	LINEAR	·	6.2 km	MPC · JPL
28170	1998 VC_{30}	—	November 10, 1998	Socorro	LINEAR	·	2.1 km	MPC · JPL
28171 Diannahu	1998 VV_{30}	Diannahu	November 10, 1998	Socorro	LINEAR	NYS	3.9 km	MPC · JPL
28172	1998 VZ_{30}	—	November 10, 1998	Socorro	LINEAR	EUN	6.8 km	MPC · JPL
28173 Hisakichi	1998 VY_{32}	Hisakichi	November 11, 1998	Chichibu	N. Satō	NYS	3.8 km	MPC · JPL
28174 Harue	1998 VC_{33}	Harue	November 12, 1998	Chichibu	N. Satō	·	5.3 km	MPC · JPL
28175	1998 VM_{33}	—	November 15, 1998	Oizumi	T. Kobayashi	·	2.7 km	MPC · JPL
28176	1998 VV_{43}	—	November 15, 1998	Kitt Peak	Spacewatch	·	1.5 km	MPC · JPL
28177	1998 VO_{53}	—	November 14, 1998	Socorro	LINEAR	·	5.8 km	MPC · JPL
28178	1998 WL_{1}	—	November 18, 1998	Oizumi	T. Kobayashi	·	3.0 km	MPC · JPL
28179	1998 WR_{1}	—	November 18, 1998	Oizumi	T. Kobayashi	·	3.2 km	MPC · JPL
28180	1998 WU_{1}	—	November 18, 1998	Oizumi	T. Kobayashi	·	4.7 km	MPC · JPL
28181	1998 WW_{5}	—	November 19, 1998	Nachi-Katsuura	Y. Shimizu, T. Urata	·	3.0 km	MPC · JPL
28182 Chadharris	1998 WB_{10}	Chadharris	November 21, 1998	Socorro	LINEAR	NYS	3.9 km	MPC · JPL
28183 Naidu	1998 WM_{16}	Naidu	November 21, 1998	Socorro	LINEAR	·	4.6 km	MPC · JPL
28184 Vaishnavirao	1998 WP_{17}	Vaishnavirao	November 21, 1998	Socorro	LINEAR	·	2.0 km	MPC · JPL
28185	1998 WJ_{18}	—	November 21, 1998	Socorro	LINEAR	·	3.8 km	MPC · JPL
28186	1998 WK_{18}	—	November 21, 1998	Socorro	LINEAR	·	2.6 km	MPC · JPL
28187	1998 WP_{19}	—	November 23, 1998	Socorro	LINEAR	MAR	5.0 km	MPC · JPL
28188	1998 WV_{19}	—	November 25, 1998	Socorro	LINEAR	EUN	8.2 km	MPC · JPL
28189	1998 WP_{22}	—	November 18, 1998	Socorro	LINEAR	·	4.9 km	MPC · JPL
28190	1998 WU_{23}	—	November 25, 1998	Socorro	LINEAR	·	10 km	MPC · JPL
28191	1998 WV_{23}	—	November 25, 1998	Socorro	LINEAR	EUN	5.7 km	MPC · JPL
28192	1998 WE_{24}	—	November 25, 1998	Socorro	LINEAR	·	9.3 km	MPC · JPL
28193 Italosvevo	1998 WY_{30}	Italosvevo	November 29, 1998	Farra d'Isonzo	Farra d'Isonzo	·	2.2 km	MPC · JPL
28194	1998 WX_{37}	—	November 21, 1998	Kitt Peak	Spacewatch	·	2.9 km	MPC · JPL
28195	1998 XW_{4}	—	December 12, 1998	Oizumi	T. Kobayashi	·	3.7 km	MPC · JPL
28196 Szeged	1998 XY_{12}	Szeged	December 15, 1998	Piszkéstető	K. Sárneczky, L. Kiss	V	3.1 km	MPC · JPL
28197	1998 XZ_{12}	—	December 15, 1998	High Point	D. K. Chesney	V	2.2 km	MPC · JPL
28198	1998 XU_{16}	—	December 15, 1998	Višnjan Observatory	K. Korlević	·	5.7 km	MPC · JPL
28199	1998 XA_{42}	—	December 14, 1998	Socorro	LINEAR	·	9.9 km	MPC · JPL
28200	1998 XF_{44}	—	December 14, 1998	Socorro	LINEAR	V	3.4 km	MPC · JPL

== 28201–28300 ==
back to top

Designation			Discovery			Properties		Ref
Permanent	Provisional	Named after	Date	Site	Discoverer(s)	Category	Diam.	Ref
28201 Lifubin	1998 XV_{44}	Lifubin	December 14, 1998	Socorro	LINEAR	·	3.7 km	MPC · JPL
28202	1998 XC_{47}	—	December 14, 1998	Socorro	LINEAR	NYS	2.4 km	MPC · JPL
28203	1998 XL_{48}	—	December 14, 1998	Socorro	LINEAR	·	1.8 km	MPC · JPL
28204 Liyakang	1998 XX_{50}	Liyakang	December 14, 1998	Socorro	LINEAR	NYS	2.3 km	MPC · JPL
28205	1998 XL_{51}	—	December 14, 1998	Socorro	LINEAR	·	1.7 km	MPC · JPL
28206 Haozhongning	1998 XO_{52}	Haozhongning	December 14, 1998	Socorro	LINEAR	·	4.0 km	MPC · JPL
28207 Blakesmith	1998 XH_{53}	Blakesmith	December 14, 1998	Socorro	LINEAR	·	3.0 km	MPC · JPL
28208 Timtrippel	1998 XE_{54}	Timtrippel	December 14, 1998	Socorro	LINEAR	·	4.9 km	MPC · JPL
28209 Chatterjee	1998 XC_{63}	Chatterjee	December 14, 1998	Socorro	LINEAR	·	5.2 km	MPC · JPL
28210 Howardfeng	1998 XF_{63}	Howardfeng	December 14, 1998	Socorro	LINEAR	slow	2.2 km	MPC · JPL
28211	1998 XJ_{64}	—	December 14, 1998	Socorro	LINEAR	·	2.9 km	MPC · JPL
28212	1998 XJ_{78}	—	December 15, 1998	Socorro	LINEAR	·	2.8 km	MPC · JPL
28213	1998 XS_{92}	—	December 15, 1998	Socorro	LINEAR	·	4.3 km	MPC · JPL
28214	1998 YW	—	December 16, 1998	Oizumi	T. Kobayashi	·	1.7 km	MPC · JPL
28215	1998 YE_{1}	—	December 16, 1998	Gekko	T. Kagawa	V	3.2 km	MPC · JPL
28216	1998 YU_{1}	—	December 17, 1998	Višnjan Observatory	K. Korlević	NYS	3.3 km	MPC · JPL
28217	1998 YO_{3}	—	December 18, 1998	Kleť	Kleť	V	2.6 km	MPC · JPL
28218	1998 YA_{6}	—	December 17, 1998	Višnjan Observatory	K. Korlević	·	2.4 km	MPC · JPL
28219	1998 YP_{8}	—	December 23, 1998	Višnjan Observatory	K. Korlević	·	3.9 km	MPC · JPL
28220 York	1998 YN_{12}	York	December 28, 1998	Kleť	J. Tichá, M. Tichý	·	2.8 km	MPC · JPL
28221	1998 YG_{17}	—	December 22, 1998	Kitt Peak	Spacewatch	KOR	4.5 km	MPC · JPL
28222 Neilpathak	1998 YF_{23}	Neilpathak	December 16, 1998	Socorro	LINEAR	·	3.5 km	MPC · JPL
28223	1998 YR_{27}	—	December 27, 1998	Nyukasa	M. Hirasawa, S. Suzuki	·	6.4 km	MPC · JPL
28224	1999 AJ	—	January 5, 1999	Višnjan Observatory	K. Korlević	NYS	2.2 km	MPC · JPL
28225	1999 AS	—	January 7, 1999	Oizumi	T. Kobayashi	·	4.1 km	MPC · JPL
28226	1999 AE_{2}	—	January 9, 1999	Oizumi	T. Kobayashi	·	4.7 km	MPC · JPL
28227	1999 AN_{2}	—	January 9, 1999	Oizumi	T. Kobayashi	·	3.6 km	MPC · JPL
28228	1999 AU_{2}	—	January 9, 1999	Oizumi	T. Kobayashi	·	5.0 km	MPC · JPL
28229	1999 AK_{4}	—	January 9, 1999	Višnjan Observatory	K. Korlević	·	2.5 km	MPC · JPL
28230	1999 AH_{5}	—	January 10, 1999	Nachi-Katsuura	Y. Shimizu, T. Urata	PHO	7.1 km	MPC · JPL
28231	1999 AL_{5}	—	January 10, 1999	Nachi-Katsuura	Y. Shimizu, T. Urata	HNS	4.3 km	MPC · JPL
28232	1999 AS_{5}	—	January 12, 1999	Oizumi	T. Kobayashi	·	4.6 km	MPC · JPL
28233	1999 AV_{5}	—	January 12, 1999	Oizumi	T. Kobayashi	·	4.9 km	MPC · JPL
28234	1999 AB_{8}	—	January 13, 1999	Oizumi	T. Kobayashi	·	11 km	MPC · JPL
28235 Kasparvonbraun	1999 AL_{8}	Kasparvonbraun	January 7, 1999	Anderson Mesa	LONEOS	·	2.9 km	MPC · JPL
28236	1999 AH_{10}	—	January 14, 1999	Višnjan Observatory	K. Korlević	KOR	4.8 km	MPC · JPL
28237	1999 AR_{16}	—	January 10, 1999	Kitt Peak	Spacewatch	·	3.0 km	MPC · JPL
28238	1999 AB_{18}	—	January 11, 1999	Kitt Peak	Spacewatch	KOR	3.9 km	MPC · JPL
28239	1999 AQ_{19}	—	January 13, 1999	Kitt Peak	Spacewatch	EOS	5.6 km	MPC · JPL
28240	1999 AP_{21}	—	January 14, 1999	Višnjan Observatory	K. Korlević	·	6.6 km	MPC · JPL
28241	1999 AC_{22}	—	January 10, 1999	Xinglong	SCAP	(5)	4.5 km	MPC · JPL
28242 Mingantu	1999 AT_{22}	Mingantu	January 6, 1999	Xinglong	SCAP	·	3.6 km	MPC · JPL
28243	1999 AA_{23}	—	January 15, 1999	Oizumi	T. Kobayashi	·	3.1 km	MPC · JPL
28244	1999 AL_{31}	—	January 14, 1999	Kitt Peak	Spacewatch	·	3.5 km	MPC · JPL
28245 Cruise	1999 AV_{37}	Cruise	January 14, 1999	Anderson Mesa	LONEOS	·	3.9 km	MPC · JPL
28246	1999 BW_{1}	—	January 18, 1999	Višnjan Observatory	K. Korlević	·	9.5 km	MPC · JPL
28247	1999 BP_{3}	—	January 19, 1999	Višnjan Observatory	K. Korlević	·	3.6 km	MPC · JPL
28248 Barthélémy	1999 BQ_{4}	Barthélémy	January 19, 1999	Caussols	ODAS	(5)	5.5 km	MPC · JPL
28249	1999 BX_{6}	—	January 21, 1999	Caussols	ODAS	(1118)	13 km	MPC · JPL
28250	1999 BC_{8}	—	January 22, 1999	Višnjan Observatory	K. Korlević	·	6.1 km	MPC · JPL
28251 Gerbaldi	1999 BW_{13}	Gerbaldi	January 20, 1999	Caussols	ODAS	KOR	4.2 km	MPC · JPL
28252	1999 BK_{15}	—	January 26, 1999	Višnjan Observatory	K. Korlević	ADE	7.7 km	MPC · JPL
28253	1999 BA_{19}	—	January 16, 1999	Socorro	LINEAR	MAR	5.0 km	MPC · JPL
28254 Raghrama	1999 BC_{21}	Raghrama	January 16, 1999	Socorro	LINEAR	·	7.0 km	MPC · JPL
28255	1999 BB_{24}	—	January 18, 1999	Socorro	LINEAR	·	2.5 km	MPC · JPL
28256	1999 BL_{24}	—	January 18, 1999	Socorro	LINEAR	V	3.9 km	MPC · JPL
28257	1999 BT_{24}	—	January 18, 1999	Socorro	LINEAR	·	14 km	MPC · JPL
28258	1999 BM_{25}	—	January 18, 1999	Socorro	LINEAR	·	3.4 km	MPC · JPL
28259	1999 BY_{27}	—	January 17, 1999	Kitt Peak	Spacewatch	·	4.6 km	MPC · JPL
28260	1999 BK_{29}	—	January 18, 1999	Kitt Peak	Spacewatch	·	8.4 km	MPC · JPL
28261	1999 CJ	—	February 4, 1999	Oizumi	T. Kobayashi	EOS	9.5 km	MPC · JPL
28262	1999 CQ_{4}	—	February 8, 1999	Višnjan Observatory	K. Korlević	·	9.1 km	MPC · JPL
28263	1999 CR_{4}	—	February 8, 1999	Višnjan Observatory	K. Korlević	·	8.4 km	MPC · JPL
28264	1999 CJ_{5}	—	February 12, 1999	Oizumi	T. Kobayashi	EOS	6.4 km	MPC · JPL
28265	1999 CL_{5}	—	February 12, 1999	Oizumi	T. Kobayashi	·	7.7 km	MPC · JPL
28266	1999 CP_{5}	—	February 12, 1999	Oizumi	T. Kobayashi	·	5.7 km	MPC · JPL
28267	1999 CH_{10}	—	February 15, 1999	Oizumi	T. Kobayashi	·	8.8 km	MPC · JPL
28268	1999 CA_{14}	—	February 8, 1999	Uenohara	N. Kawasato	·	2.9 km	MPC · JPL
28269	1999 CQ_{14}	—	February 15, 1999	Višnjan Observatory	K. Korlević	EUN	5.2 km	MPC · JPL
28270	1999 CS_{14}	—	February 15, 1999	Višnjan Observatory	K. Korlević	KOR	4.8 km	MPC · JPL
28271	1999 CK_{16}	—	February 6, 1999	Višnjan Observatory	K. Korlević	KOR	4.0 km	MPC · JPL
28272 Mikejanner	1999 CY_{17}	Mikejanner	February 10, 1999	Socorro	LINEAR	·	3.2 km	MPC · JPL
28273 Maianhvu	1999 CD_{21}	Maianhvu	February 10, 1999	Socorro	LINEAR	·	3.4 km	MPC · JPL
28274	1999 CF_{21}	—	February 10, 1999	Socorro	LINEAR	EUN	3.7 km	MPC · JPL
28275 Quoc-Bao	1999 CM_{23}	Quoc-Bao	February 10, 1999	Socorro	LINEAR	·	7.9 km	MPC · JPL
28276 Filipnaiser	1999 CN_{25}	Filipnaiser	February 10, 1999	Socorro	LINEAR	NYS	2.1 km	MPC · JPL
28277 Chengherngyi	1999 CN_{27}	Chengherngyi	February 10, 1999	Socorro	LINEAR	V	2.9 km	MPC · JPL
28278	1999 CQ_{27}	—	February 10, 1999	Socorro	LINEAR	EOS	6.6 km	MPC · JPL
28279	1999 CD_{28}	—	February 10, 1999	Socorro	LINEAR	·	15 km	MPC · JPL
28280	1999 CG_{28}	—	February 10, 1999	Socorro	LINEAR	·	3.1 km	MPC · JPL
28281	1999 CT_{29}	—	February 10, 1999	Socorro	LINEAR	EUN	10 km	MPC · JPL
28282	1999 CJ_{35}	—	February 10, 1999	Socorro	LINEAR	EOS	9.1 km	MPC · JPL
28283	1999 CR_{35}	—	February 10, 1999	Socorro	LINEAR	EOS	7.5 km	MPC · JPL
28284	1999 CG_{37}	—	February 10, 1999	Socorro	LINEAR	·	7.5 km	MPC · JPL
28285	1999 CP_{39}	—	February 10, 1999	Socorro	LINEAR	·	4.9 km	MPC · JPL
28286	1999 CJ_{40}	—	February 10, 1999	Socorro	LINEAR	·	10 km	MPC · JPL
28287 Osmanov	1999 CT_{42}	Osmanov	February 10, 1999	Socorro	LINEAR	KOR	4.5 km	MPC · JPL
28288	1999 CL_{49}	—	February 10, 1999	Socorro	LINEAR	TEL	4.4 km	MPC · JPL
28289	1999 CT_{50}	—	February 10, 1999	Socorro	LINEAR	THM	10 km	MPC · JPL
28290	1999 CY_{51}	—	February 10, 1999	Socorro	LINEAR	GEF	5.6 km	MPC · JPL
28291	1999 CX_{52}	—	February 10, 1999	Socorro	LINEAR	V	5.7 km	MPC · JPL
28292	1999 CX_{54}	—	February 10, 1999	Socorro	LINEAR	·	7.4 km	MPC · JPL
28293	1999 CN_{57}	—	February 10, 1999	Socorro	LINEAR	·	4.1 km	MPC · JPL
28294	1999 CS_{59}	—	February 12, 1999	Socorro	LINEAR	NAE · slow	10 km	MPC · JPL
28295 Heyizheng	1999 CE_{61}	Heyizheng	February 12, 1999	Socorro	LINEAR	·	6.4 km	MPC · JPL
28296	1999 CQ_{63}	—	February 12, 1999	Socorro	LINEAR	·	5.2 km	MPC · JPL
28297	1999 CR_{63}	—	February 12, 1999	Socorro	LINEAR	·	9.4 km	MPC · JPL
28298	1999 CM_{64}	—	February 12, 1999	Socorro	LINEAR	·	6.9 km	MPC · JPL
28299 Kanghaoyan	1999 CH_{66}	Kanghaoyan	February 12, 1999	Socorro	LINEAR	·	3.7 km	MPC · JPL
28300	1999 CS_{67}	—	February 12, 1999	Socorro	LINEAR	EOS	6.4 km	MPC · JPL

== 28301–28400 ==
back to top

Designation			Discovery			Properties		Ref
Permanent	Provisional	Named after	Date	Site	Discoverer(s)	Category	Diam.	Ref
28301	1999 CW_{67}	—	February 12, 1999	Socorro	LINEAR	DOR	11 km	MPC · JPL
28302	1999 CK_{71}	—	February 12, 1999	Socorro	LINEAR	·	11 km	MPC · JPL
28303	1999 CY_{72}	—	February 12, 1999	Socorro	LINEAR	·	8.5 km	MPC · JPL
28304	1999 CC_{75}	—	February 12, 1999	Socorro	LINEAR	EUN	6.3 km	MPC · JPL
28305 Wangjiayi	1999 CH_{79}	Wangjiayi	February 12, 1999	Socorro	LINEAR	·	4.5 km	MPC · JPL
28306	1999 CV_{79}	—	February 12, 1999	Socorro	LINEAR	VER	11 km	MPC · JPL
28307	1999 CN_{80}	—	February 12, 1999	Socorro	LINEAR	EUN	6.7 km	MPC · JPL
28308	1999 CA_{81}	—	February 12, 1999	Socorro	LINEAR	·	5.2 km	MPC · JPL
28309 Ericfein	1999 CB_{81}	Ericfein	February 12, 1999	Socorro	LINEAR	·	8.3 km	MPC · JPL
28310	1999 CT_{81}	—	February 12, 1999	Socorro	LINEAR	·	7.8 km	MPC · JPL
28311	1999 CY_{90}	—	February 10, 1999	Socorro	LINEAR	·	3.7 km	MPC · JPL
28312	1999 CH_{94}	—	February 10, 1999	Socorro	LINEAR	TEL	4.4 km	MPC · JPL
28313	1999 CU_{99}	—	February 10, 1999	Socorro	LINEAR	·	7.1 km	MPC · JPL
28314	1999 CG_{100}	—	February 10, 1999	Socorro	LINEAR	KOR	5.2 km	MPC · JPL
28315	1999 CD_{101}	—	February 10, 1999	Socorro	LINEAR	·	6.4 km	MPC · JPL
28316	1999 CK_{101}	—	February 10, 1999	Socorro	LINEAR	·	6.0 km	MPC · JPL
28317 Aislinndeely	1999 CA_{106}	Aislinndeely	February 12, 1999	Socorro	LINEAR	·	2.7 km	MPC · JPL
28318 Janecox	1999 CE_{106}	Janecox	February 12, 1999	Socorro	LINEAR	·	3.0 km	MPC · JPL
28319	1999 CR_{107}	—	February 12, 1999	Socorro	LINEAR	EUN	3.9 km	MPC · JPL
28320	1999 CG_{110}	—	February 12, 1999	Socorro	LINEAR	·	6.1 km	MPC · JPL
28321 Arnabdey	1999 CV_{110}	Arnabdey	February 12, 1999	Socorro	LINEAR	·	3.4 km	MPC · JPL
28322 Kaeberich	1999 CK_{111}	Kaeberich	February 12, 1999	Socorro	LINEAR	·	5.2 km	MPC · JPL
28323	1999 CP_{112}	—	February 12, 1999	Socorro	LINEAR	EOS	3.9 km	MPC · JPL
28324 Davidcampeau	1999 CN_{114}	Davidcampeau	February 12, 1999	Socorro	LINEAR	·	3.3 km	MPC · JPL
28325	1999 CK_{118}	—	February 12, 1999	Socorro	LINEAR	EUN	4.9 km	MPC · JPL
28326	1999 CY_{120}	—	February 11, 1999	Socorro	LINEAR	EUN	6.3 km	MPC · JPL
28327	1999 CT_{123}	—	February 11, 1999	Socorro	LINEAR	·	3.6 km	MPC · JPL
28328	1999 CN_{125}	—	February 11, 1999	Socorro	LINEAR	ADE	9.2 km	MPC · JPL
28329	1999 CD_{150}	—	February 13, 1999	Kitt Peak	Spacewatch	NYS	2.8 km	MPC · JPL
28330	1999 CG_{152}	—	February 12, 1999	Kitt Peak	Spacewatch	THM	6.7 km	MPC · JPL
28331 Dianebérard	1999 CD_{156}	Dianebérard	February 14, 1999	Anderson Mesa	LONEOS	EMA	11 km	MPC · JPL
28332	1999 DU_{1}	—	February 18, 1999	Haleakala	NEAT	·	3.3 km	MPC · JPL
28333	1999 DW_{1}	—	February 18, 1999	Haleakala	NEAT	EOS	6.3 km	MPC · JPL
28334	1999 DJ_{2}	—	February 19, 1999	Oizumi	T. Kobayashi	slow	6.3 km	MPC · JPL
28335	1999 DN_{2}	—	February 19, 1999	Oizumi	T. Kobayashi	(1118)	13 km	MPC · JPL
28336	1999 DZ_{4}	—	February 17, 1999	Socorro	LINEAR	·	13 km	MPC · JPL
28337	1999 EA_{2}	—	March 9, 1999	Kitt Peak	Spacewatch	(5)	3.1 km	MPC · JPL
28338	1999 EL_{2}	—	March 10, 1999	Kitt Peak	Spacewatch	·	11 km	MPC · JPL
28339	1999 EC_{3}	—	March 10, 1999	Reedy Creek	J. Broughton	EOS	6.3 km	MPC · JPL
28340 Yukihiro	1999 EG_{5}	Yukihiro	March 13, 1999	Yatsuka	H. Abe	EOS	11 km	MPC · JPL
28341 Bingaman	1999 EU_{5}	Bingaman	March 13, 1999	Goodricke-Pigott	R. A. Tucker	KOR	5.2 km	MPC · JPL
28342 Haverhals	1999 FB_{9}	Haverhals	March 19, 1999	Anderson Mesa	LONEOS	KOR	5.7 km	MPC · JPL
28343 Florcalandra	1999 FG_{9}	Florcalandra	March 20, 1999	Anderson Mesa	LONEOS	TIR	9.3 km	MPC · JPL
28344 Tallsalt	1999 FE_{19}	Tallsalt	March 22, 1999	Anderson Mesa	LONEOS	·	5.1 km	MPC · JPL
28345 Akivabarnun	1999 FL_{19}	Akivabarnun	March 22, 1999	Anderson Mesa	LONEOS	·	11 km	MPC · JPL
28346 Kent	1999 FV_{19}	Kent	March 19, 1999	Fountain Hills	C. W. Juels	·	5.8 km	MPC · JPL
28347	1999 FD_{22}	—	March 19, 1999	Socorro	LINEAR	EOS	7.9 km	MPC · JPL
28348	1999 FO_{23}	—	March 19, 1999	Socorro	LINEAR	EOS	10 km	MPC · JPL
28349	1999 FB_{26}	—	March 19, 1999	Socorro	LINEAR	·	5.7 km	MPC · JPL
28350	1999 FC_{26}	—	March 19, 1999	Socorro	LINEAR	EOS	8.5 km	MPC · JPL
28351 Andrewfeldman	1999 FP_{29}	Andrewfeldman	March 19, 1999	Socorro	LINEAR	·	2.3 km	MPC · JPL
28352	1999 FF_{31}	—	March 19, 1999	Socorro	LINEAR	EOS	11 km	MPC · JPL
28353 Chrisnielsen	1999 FH_{32}	Chrisnielsen	March 19, 1999	Socorro	LINEAR	·	3.3 km	MPC · JPL
28354	1999 FV_{33}	—	March 19, 1999	Socorro	LINEAR	·	11 km	MPC · JPL
28355	1999 FW_{33}	—	March 19, 1999	Socorro	LINEAR	·	10 km	MPC · JPL
28356	1999 FF_{38}	—	March 20, 1999	Socorro	LINEAR	·	4.1 km	MPC · JPL
28357	1999 FB_{40}	—	March 20, 1999	Socorro	LINEAR	MAR	4.6 km	MPC · JPL
28358	1999 FW_{48}	—	March 20, 1999	Socorro	LINEAR	·	10 km	MPC · JPL
28359	1999 FP_{52}	—	March 20, 1999	Socorro	LINEAR	·	8.0 km	MPC · JPL
28360	1999 FU_{55}	—	March 20, 1999	Socorro	LINEAR	KOR	7.6 km	MPC · JPL
28361	1999 FF_{59}	—	March 20, 1999	Socorro	LINEAR	·	3.3 km	MPC · JPL
28362	1999 GP_{5}	—	April 7, 1999	Nachi-Katsuura	Y. Shimizu, T. Urata	NAE	12 km	MPC · JPL
28363	1999 GN_{6}	—	April 14, 1999	Woomera	F. B. Zoltowski	KOR	3.7 km	MPC · JPL
28364 Bruceelmegreen	1999 GN_{7}	Bruceelmegreen	April 7, 1999	Anderson Mesa	LONEOS	·	4.8 km	MPC · JPL
28365	1999 GF_{14}	—	April 15, 1999	Socorro	LINEAR	·	9.6 km	MPC · JPL
28366 Verkuil	1999 GA_{16}	Verkuil	April 9, 1999	Socorro	LINEAR	·	7.2 km	MPC · JPL
28367	1999 GO_{16}	—	April 15, 1999	Socorro	LINEAR	·	9.8 km	MPC · JPL
28368	1999 GW_{18}	—	April 15, 1999	Socorro	LINEAR	·	11 km	MPC · JPL
28369	1999 GA_{21}	—	April 15, 1999	Socorro	LINEAR	·	12 km	MPC · JPL
28370	1999 GK_{34}	—	April 6, 1999	Socorro	LINEAR	·	7.6 km	MPC · JPL
28371	1999 GG_{39}	—	April 12, 1999	Socorro	LINEAR	EOS	9.9 km	MPC · JPL
28372	1999 HU	—	April 18, 1999	Woomera	F. B. Zoltowski	EOS · slow	9.8 km	MPC · JPL
28373	1999 HL_{3}	—	April 18, 1999	Catalina	CSS	·	17 km	MPC · JPL
28374	1999 HL_{11}	—	April 17, 1999	Socorro	LINEAR	THM	9.4 km	MPC · JPL
28375	1999 JC	—	May 2, 1999	Višnjan Observatory	K. Korlević	THM	12 km	MPC · JPL
28376 Atifjaved	1999 JX_{19}	Atifjaved	May 10, 1999	Socorro	LINEAR	·	2.2 km	MPC · JPL
28377	1999 JC_{24}	—	May 10, 1999	Socorro	LINEAR	EUN	7.4 km	MPC · JPL
28378	1999 JN_{24}	—	May 10, 1999	Socorro	LINEAR	EOS	8.8 km	MPC · JPL
28379	1999 JK_{37}	—	May 10, 1999	Socorro	LINEAR	·	2.8 km	MPC · JPL
28380	1999 JO_{38}	—	May 10, 1999	Socorro	LINEAR	GEF	6.2 km	MPC · JPL
28381	1999 JQ_{39}	—	May 10, 1999	Socorro	LINEAR	EOS	10 km	MPC · JPL
28382 Stevengillen	1999 JZ_{48}	Stevengillen	May 10, 1999	Socorro	LINEAR	MAS	2.3 km	MPC · JPL
28383	1999 JX_{68}	—	May 12, 1999	Socorro	LINEAR	·	5.9 km	MPC · JPL
28384	1999 JT_{76}	—	May 10, 1999	Socorro	LINEAR	V	4.4 km	MPC · JPL
28385	1999 JX_{76}	—	May 12, 1999	Socorro	LINEAR	(1118)	19 km	MPC · JPL
28386	1999 JD_{79}	—	May 13, 1999	Socorro	LINEAR	·	8.3 km	MPC · JPL
28387	1999 JE_{79}	—	May 13, 1999	Socorro	LINEAR	·	14 km	MPC · JPL
28388	1999 JM_{86}	—	May 12, 1999	Socorro	LINEAR	EOS	8.5 km	MPC · JPL
28389	1999 JN_{95}	—	May 12, 1999	Socorro	LINEAR	EOS	7.4 km	MPC · JPL
28390 Demjohopkins	1999 JW_{131}	Demjohopkins	May 13, 1999	Socorro	LINEAR	·	2.8 km	MPC · JPL
28391	1999 LV_{11}	—	June 9, 1999	Socorro	LINEAR	TIR	14 km	MPC · JPL
28392	1999 NQ_{11}	—	July 13, 1999	Socorro	LINEAR	·	4.5 km	MPC · JPL
28393	1999 RB_{12}	—	September 7, 1999	Socorro	LINEAR	·	8.4 km	MPC · JPL
28394 Mittag-Leffler	1999 RY_{36}	Mittag-Leffler	September 13, 1999	Prescott	P. G. Comba	·	4.8 km	MPC · JPL
28395	1999 RZ_{42}	—	September 3, 1999	Siding Spring	R. H. McNaught	·	7.1 km	MPC · JPL
28396 Eymann	1999 RY_{44}	Eymann	September 13, 1999	Guitalens	Klotz, A.	·	1.9 km	MPC · JPL
28397 Forrestbetton	1999 RK_{53}	Forrestbetton	September 7, 1999	Socorro	LINEAR	V	2.0 km	MPC · JPL
28398 Ericthomas	1999 RE_{55}	Ericthomas	September 7, 1999	Socorro	LINEAR	·	3.0 km	MPC · JPL
28399	1999 RY_{136}	—	September 9, 1999	Socorro	LINEAR	EOS	5.3 km	MPC · JPL
28400 Morgansinko	1999 RW_{160}	Morgansinko	September 9, 1999	Socorro	LINEAR	·	3.4 km	MPC · JPL

== 28401–28500 ==
back to top

Designation			Discovery			Properties		Ref
Permanent	Provisional	Named after	Date	Site	Discoverer(s)	Category	Diam.	Ref
28401	1999 RT_{165}	—	September 9, 1999	Socorro	LINEAR	·	11 km	MPC · JPL
28402 Matthewkim	1999 RV_{211}	Matthewkim	September 8, 1999	Socorro	LINEAR	V	2.2 km	MPC · JPL
28403	1999 TY	—	October 1, 1999	Višnjan Observatory	K. Korlević	(194) · slow	5.7 km	MPC · JPL
28404	1999 TQ_{5}	—	October 1, 1999	Višnjan Observatory	K. Korlević, M. Jurić	(5)	6.2 km	MPC · JPL
28405	1999 TG_{13}	—	October 10, 1999	Oohira	T. Urata	·	2.6 km	MPC · JPL
28406	1999 TB_{100}	—	October 2, 1999	Socorro	LINEAR	slow	11 km	MPC · JPL
28407 Meghanarao	1999 TH_{135}	Meghanarao	October 6, 1999	Socorro	LINEAR	·	6.8 km	MPC · JPL
28408 van Baalen	1999 TS_{222}	van Baalen	October 2, 1999	Anderson Mesa	LONEOS	·	5.3 km	MPC · JPL
28409	1999 TQ_{226}	—	October 3, 1999	Kitt Peak	Spacewatch	·	5.3 km	MPC · JPL
28410	1999 TE_{246}	—	October 8, 1999	Catalina	CSS	·	7.4 km	MPC · JPL
28411 Xiuqicao	1999 TQ_{284}	Xiuqicao	October 9, 1999	Socorro	LINEAR	·	2.4 km	MPC · JPL
28412	1999 UY_{13}	—	October 29, 1999	Catalina	CSS	·	3.6 km	MPC · JPL
28413	1999 UT_{26}	—	October 30, 1999	Catalina	CSS	·	3.0 km	MPC · JPL
28414	1999 UH_{46}	—	October 31, 1999	Catalina	CSS	·	3.8 km	MPC · JPL
28415 Yingxiong	1999 VE_{27}	Yingxiong	November 3, 1999	Socorro	LINEAR	·	3.6 km	MPC · JPL
28416 Ngqin	1999 VW_{31}	Ngqin	November 3, 1999	Socorro	LINEAR	·	1.7 km	MPC · JPL
28417 Leewei	1999 VA_{50}	Leewei	November 3, 1999	Socorro	LINEAR	·	6.6 km	MPC · JPL
28418 Pornwasu	1999 VQ_{54}	Pornwasu	November 4, 1999	Socorro	LINEAR	·	1.5 km	MPC · JPL
28419 Tanpitcha	1999 VA_{67}	Tanpitcha	November 4, 1999	Socorro	LINEAR	·	2.1 km	MPC · JPL
28420	1999 VC_{78}	—	November 4, 1999	Socorro	LINEAR	·	4.3 km	MPC · JPL
28421	1999 VH_{87}	—	November 6, 1999	Catalina	CSS	H	2.0 km	MPC · JPL
28422	1999 VA_{154}	—	November 13, 1999	Catalina	CSS	GEF	3.9 km	MPC · JPL
28423	1999 WN_{3}	—	November 28, 1999	Oizumi	T. Kobayashi	·	8.6 km	MPC · JPL
28424	1999 XA	—	December 1, 1999	Socorro	LINEAR	·	6.5 km	MPC · JPL
28425 Sungkanit	1999 XL_{24}	Sungkanit	December 6, 1999	Socorro	LINEAR	·	4.0 km	MPC · JPL
28426 Sangani	1999 XV_{28}	Sangani	December 6, 1999	Socorro	LINEAR	·	3.0 km	MPC · JPL
28427 Gidwani	1999 XP_{42}	Gidwani	December 7, 1999	Socorro	LINEAR	·	2.8 km	MPC · JPL
28428 Ankurvaishnav	1999 XQ_{43}	Ankurvaishnav	December 7, 1999	Socorro	LINEAR	·	2.4 km	MPC · JPL
28429	1999 XF_{75}	—	December 7, 1999	Socorro	LINEAR	·	2.3 km	MPC · JPL
28430	1999 XP_{124}	—	December 7, 1999	Catalina	CSS	·	2.3 km	MPC · JPL
28431	1999 XO_{136}	—	December 13, 1999	Fountain Hills	C. W. Juels	·	2.0 km	MPC · JPL
28432	1999 XY_{168}	—	December 10, 1999	Socorro	LINEAR	EUN	5.6 km	MPC · JPL
28433 Samarquez	1999 XP_{175}	Samarquez	December 10, 1999	Socorro	LINEAR	(5)	3.6 km	MPC · JPL
28434	1999 XL_{176}	—	December 10, 1999	Socorro	LINEAR	·	8.2 km	MPC · JPL
28435	1999 XW_{209}	—	December 13, 1999	Socorro	LINEAR	EOS	5.4 km	MPC · JPL
28436 Davesawyer	1999 XJ_{230}	Davesawyer	December 7, 1999	Anderson Mesa	LONEOS	·	2.2 km	MPC · JPL
28437 Belényu	1999 YJ_{16}	Belényu	December 31, 1999	Kitt Peak	Spacewatch	·	3.1 km	MPC · JPL
28438 Venkateswaran	2000 AG_{30}	Venkateswaran	January 3, 2000	Socorro	LINEAR	NYS	2.6 km	MPC · JPL
28439 Miguelreyes	2000 AM_{30}	Miguelreyes	January 3, 2000	Socorro	LINEAR	·	3.9 km	MPC · JPL
28440	2000 AN_{40}	—	January 3, 2000	Socorro	LINEAR	·	2.2 km	MPC · JPL
28441	2000 AE_{43}	—	January 5, 2000	Socorro	LINEAR	H	1.4 km	MPC · JPL
28442 Nicholashuey	2000 AN_{61}	Nicholashuey	January 4, 2000	Socorro	LINEAR	NYS	3.7 km	MPC · JPL
28443 Crisara	2000 AP_{86}	Crisara	January 5, 2000	Socorro	LINEAR	·	1.8 km	MPC · JPL
28444 Alexrabii	2000 AP_{91}	Alexrabii	January 5, 2000	Socorro	LINEAR	·	2.3 km	MPC · JPL
28445	2000 AQ_{95}	—	January 4, 2000	Socorro	LINEAR	·	4.8 km	MPC · JPL
28446 Davlantes	2000 AQ_{96}	Davlantes	January 4, 2000	Socorro	LINEAR	·	2.3 km	MPC · JPL
28447 Arjunmathur	2000 AW_{96}	Arjunmathur	January 4, 2000	Socorro	LINEAR	·	2.1 km	MPC · JPL
28448	2000 AN_{97}	—	January 4, 2000	Socorro	LINEAR	·	6.2 km	MPC · JPL
28449 Ericlau	2000 AK_{117}	Ericlau	January 5, 2000	Socorro	LINEAR	·	5.0 km	MPC · JPL
28450 Saravolz	2000 AB_{119}	Saravolz	January 5, 2000	Socorro	LINEAR	·	2.4 km	MPC · JPL
28451 Tylerhoward	2000 AD_{129}	Tylerhoward	January 5, 2000	Socorro	LINEAR	NYS	3.4 km	MPC · JPL
28452 Natkondamuri	2000 AD_{130}	Natkondamuri	January 5, 2000	Socorro	LINEAR	·	5.4 km	MPC · JPL
28453 Alexcecil	2000 AE_{131}	Alexcecil	January 6, 2000	Socorro	LINEAR	·	4.4 km	MPC · JPL
28454	2000 AF_{137}	—	January 4, 2000	Socorro	LINEAR	·	8.9 km	MPC · JPL
28455	2000 AV_{137}	—	January 4, 2000	Socorro	LINEAR	·	5.4 km	MPC · JPL
28456	2000 AY_{137}	—	January 4, 2000	Socorro	LINEAR	·	5.4 km	MPC · JPL
28457 Chloeanassis	2000 AX_{143}	Chloeanassis	January 5, 2000	Socorro	LINEAR	V	2.7 km	MPC · JPL
28458	2000 AL_{144}	—	January 5, 2000	Socorro	LINEAR	·	5.5 km	MPC · JPL
28459	2000 AW_{144}	—	January 5, 2000	Socorro	LINEAR	2:1J	7.0 km	MPC · JPL
28460 Ariannepapa	2000 AY_{163}	Ariannepapa	January 5, 2000	Socorro	LINEAR	·	6.7 km	MPC · JPL
28461	2000 AL_{164}	—	January 5, 2000	Socorro	LINEAR	·	7.9 km	MPC · JPL
28462	2000 AO_{164}	—	January 5, 2000	Socorro	LINEAR	·	3.7 km	MPC · JPL
28463	2000 AG_{168}	—	January 7, 2000	Farpoint	Farpoint	V	1.9 km	MPC · JPL
28464	2000 AZ_{185}	—	January 8, 2000	Socorro	LINEAR	MAR	3.4 km	MPC · JPL
28465 Janesmyth	2000 AQ_{237}	Janesmyth	January 5, 2000	Socorro	LINEAR	NYS	3.3 km	MPC · JPL
28466	2000 AV_{243}	—	January 7, 2000	Socorro	LINEAR	·	7.8 km	MPC · JPL
28467 Maurentejamie	2000 AA_{244}	Maurentejamie	January 7, 2000	Socorro	LINEAR	·	2.4 km	MPC · JPL
28468 Shichangxu	2000 AG_{246}	Shichangxu	January 12, 2000	Xinglong	SCAP	·	4.6 km	MPC · JPL
28469	2000 BU_{8}	—	January 29, 2000	Socorro	LINEAR	·	8.3 km	MPC · JPL
28470	2000 BJ_{12}	—	January 28, 2000	Kitt Peak	Spacewatch	·	3.3 km	MPC · JPL
28471	2000 BZ_{13}	—	January 27, 2000	Oizumi	T. Kobayashi	NYS	3.5 km	MPC · JPL
28472	2000 BE_{14}	—	January 28, 2000	Oizumi	T. Kobayashi	EUN	4.6 km	MPC · JPL
28473	2000 BF_{15}	—	January 31, 2000	Oizumi	T. Kobayashi	EOS	6.4 km	MPC · JPL
28474 Bustamante	2000 BB_{30}	Bustamante	January 30, 2000	Socorro	LINEAR	(883)	3.0 km	MPC · JPL
28475 Garrett	2000 CU	Garrett	February 1, 2000	Catalina	CSS	·	2.3 km	MPC · JPL
28476	2000 CK_{2}	—	February 2, 2000	Oizumi	T. Kobayashi	·	2.9 km	MPC · JPL
28477	2000 CB_{4}	—	February 5, 2000	Socorro	LINEAR	BRA	5.1 km	MPC · JPL
28478	2000 CR_{24}	—	February 2, 2000	Socorro	LINEAR	·	2.3 km	MPC · JPL
28479 Varlotta	2000 CF_{26}	Varlotta	February 2, 2000	Socorro	LINEAR	(1338) (FLO)	2.5 km	MPC · JPL
28480 Seojinyoung	2000 CL_{26}	Seojinyoung	February 2, 2000	Socorro	LINEAR	·	3.2 km	MPC · JPL
28481 Shindongju	2000 CO_{26}	Shindongju	February 2, 2000	Socorro	LINEAR	MAS	2.0 km	MPC · JPL
28482 Bauerle	2000 CK_{29}	Bauerle	February 2, 2000	Socorro	LINEAR	·	5.5 km	MPC · JPL
28483 Allenyuan	2000 CJ_{39}	Allenyuan	February 4, 2000	Socorro	LINEAR	·	2.4 km	MPC · JPL
28484 Aishwarya	2000 CO_{43}	Aishwarya	February 2, 2000	Socorro	LINEAR	·	2.0 km	MPC · JPL
28485 Dastidar	2000 CK_{49}	Dastidar	February 2, 2000	Socorro	LINEAR	fast	3.8 km	MPC · JPL
28486	2000 CZ_{51}	—	February 2, 2000	Socorro	LINEAR	·	2.5 km	MPC · JPL
28487	2000 CB_{58}	—	February 5, 2000	Socorro	LINEAR	·	3.2 km	MPC · JPL
28488 Gautam	2000 CF_{58}	Gautam	February 5, 2000	Socorro	LINEAR	·	5.0 km	MPC · JPL
28489	2000 CN_{58}	—	February 5, 2000	Socorro	LINEAR	·	17 km	MPC · JPL
28490	2000 CQ_{58}	—	February 5, 2000	Socorro	LINEAR	·	15 km	MPC · JPL
28491	2000 CC_{59}	—	February 5, 2000	Farpoint	Farpoint	·	8.5 km	MPC · JPL
28492 Marik	2000 CM_{59}	Marik	February 1, 2000	Piszkéstető	JATE Asteroid Survey	·	3.0 km	MPC · JPL
28493 Duncan-Lewis	2000 CC_{63}	Duncan-Lewis	February 2, 2000	Socorro	LINEAR	·	2.5 km	MPC · JPL
28494 Jasmine	2000 CW_{63}	Jasmine	February 2, 2000	Socorro	LINEAR	·	2.3 km	MPC · JPL
28495	2000 CA_{64}	—	February 2, 2000	Socorro	LINEAR	·	3.6 km	MPC · JPL
28496	2000 CR_{68}	—	February 1, 2000	Kitt Peak	Spacewatch	·	5.6 km	MPC · JPL
28497	2000 CJ_{69}	—	February 1, 2000	Kitt Peak	Spacewatch	slow	2.7 km	MPC · JPL
28498	2000 CL_{70}	—	February 7, 2000	Socorro	LINEAR	slow	6.3 km	MPC · JPL
28499	2000 CG_{75}	—	February 4, 2000	Socorro	LINEAR	·	2.8 km	MPC · JPL
28500	2000 CW_{76}	—	February 10, 2000	Višnjan Observatory	K. Korlević	V	1.8 km	MPC · JPL

== 28501–28600 ==
back to top

Designation			Discovery			Properties		Ref
Permanent	Provisional	Named after	Date	Site	Discoverer(s)	Category	Diam.	Ref
28501	2000 CO_{79}	—	February 8, 2000	Kitt Peak	Spacewatch	MAS	1.2 km	MPC · JPL
28502	2000 CV_{79}	—	February 8, 2000	Kitt Peak	Spacewatch	ADE	9.3 km	MPC · JPL
28503 Angelazhang	2000 CZ_{82}	Angelazhang	February 4, 2000	Socorro	LINEAR	NYS	4.5 km	MPC · JPL
28504 Rebeccafaye	2000 CD_{83}	Rebeccafaye	February 4, 2000	Socorro	LINEAR	V	2.1 km	MPC · JPL
28505 Sagarrambhia	2000 CP_{83}	Sagarrambhia	February 4, 2000	Socorro	LINEAR	·	3.0 km	MPC · JPL
28506	2000 CR_{83}	—	February 4, 2000	Socorro	LINEAR	·	2.7 km	MPC · JPL
28507	2000 CD_{87}	—	February 4, 2000	Socorro	LINEAR	·	2.6 km	MPC · JPL
28508 Kishore	2000 CD_{89}	Kishore	February 4, 2000	Socorro	LINEAR	·	4.5 km	MPC · JPL
28509 Feddersen	2000 CB_{92}	Feddersen	February 6, 2000	Socorro	LINEAR	·	2.2 km	MPC · JPL
28510	2000 CC_{95}	—	February 8, 2000	Socorro	LINEAR	MAR	4.7 km	MPC · JPL
28511 Marggraff	2000 CW_{102}	Marggraff	February 2, 2000	Socorro	LINEAR	NYS	3.4 km	MPC · JPL
28512 Tanyuan	2000 CG_{103}	Tanyuan	February 6, 2000	Socorro	LINEAR	·	6.6 km	MPC · JPL
28513 Guo	2000 CM_{126}	Guo	February 5, 2000	Kitt Peak	M. W. Buie	NYS	2.2 km	MPC · JPL
28514	2000 DQ_{2}	—	February 26, 2000	Oaxaca	Roe, J. M.	·	5.6 km	MPC · JPL
28515	2000 DK_{3}	—	February 27, 2000	Višnjan Observatory	K. Korlević, M. Jurić	·	3.9 km	MPC · JPL
28516 Möbius	2000 DQ_{3}	Möbius	February 27, 2000	Prescott	P. G. Comba	·	3.3 km	MPC · JPL
28517	2000 DD_{7}	—	February 29, 2000	Oizumi	T. Kobayashi	·	3.1 km	MPC · JPL
28518	2000 DE_{7}	—	February 29, 2000	Oizumi	T. Kobayashi	V	3.8 km	MPC · JPL
28519 Sweetman	2000 DP_{15}	Sweetman	February 26, 2000	Catalina	CSS	(1338) (FLO)	3.4 km	MPC · JPL
28520	2000 DH_{16}	—	February 29, 2000	Višnjan Observatory	K. Korlević	·	3.0 km	MPC · JPL
28521 Mattmcintyre	2000 DK_{27}	Mattmcintyre	February 29, 2000	Socorro	LINEAR	·	3.2 km	MPC · JPL
28522	2000 DP_{34}	—	February 29, 2000	Socorro	LINEAR	·	1.8 km	MPC · JPL
28523	2000 DH_{50}	—	February 29, 2000	Socorro	LINEAR	THM	8.5 km	MPC · JPL
28524 Ebright	2000 DA_{52}	Ebright	February 29, 2000	Socorro	LINEAR	·	3.0 km	MPC · JPL
28525 Andrewabboud	2000 DY_{57}	Andrewabboud	February 29, 2000	Socorro	LINEAR	·	2.2 km	MPC · JPL
28526	2000 DV_{65}	—	February 29, 2000	Socorro	LINEAR	·	2.4 km	MPC · JPL
28527 Kathleenrose	2000 DW_{68}	Kathleenrose	February 29, 2000	Socorro	LINEAR	·	2.8 km	MPC · JPL
28528	2000 DC_{70}	—	February 29, 2000	Socorro	LINEAR	·	3.9 km	MPC · JPL
28529	2000 DQ_{70}	—	February 29, 2000	Socorro	LINEAR	·	6.1 km	MPC · JPL
28530 Shiyimeng	2000 DR_{71}	Shiyimeng	February 29, 2000	Socorro	LINEAR	·	4.4 km	MPC · JPL
28531 Nikbogdanov	2000 DW_{71}	Nikbogdanov	February 29, 2000	Socorro	LINEAR	·	4.6 km	MPC · JPL
28532	2000 DE_{78}	—	February 29, 2000	Socorro	LINEAR	·	3.9 km	MPC · JPL
28533 Iansohl	2000 DL_{78}	Iansohl	February 29, 2000	Socorro	LINEAR	NYS	2.8 km	MPC · JPL
28534 Taylorwilson	2000 DO_{82}	Taylorwilson	February 28, 2000	Socorro	LINEAR	·	1.9 km	MPC · JPL
28535 Sungjanet	2000 DE_{85}	Sungjanet	February 29, 2000	Socorro	LINEAR	·	2.3 km	MPC · JPL
28536 Hunaiwen	2000 DX_{97}	Hunaiwen	February 29, 2000	Socorro	LINEAR	·	3.7 km	MPC · JPL
28537 Kirapowell	2000 DJ_{106}	Kirapowell	February 29, 2000	Socorro	LINEAR	·	2.9 km	MPC · JPL
28538 Ruisong	2000 DY_{106}	Ruisong	February 29, 2000	Socorro	LINEAR	·	3.6 km	MPC · JPL
28539	2000 EO_{3}	—	March 3, 2000	Socorro	LINEAR	·	3.5 km	MPC · JPL
28540	2000 EC_{4}	—	March 4, 2000	Reedy Creek	J. Broughton	·	6.2 km	MPC · JPL
28541	2000 ED_{6}	—	March 2, 2000	Kitt Peak	Spacewatch	·	3.8 km	MPC · JPL
28542 Cespedes-Nano	2000 EE_{10}	Cespedes-Nano	March 3, 2000	Socorro	LINEAR	·	3.1 km	MPC · JPL
28543 Solis-Gozar	2000 EF_{17}	Solis-Gozar	March 3, 2000	Socorro	LINEAR	V	2.0 km	MPC · JPL
28544	2000 EM_{19}	—	March 5, 2000	Socorro	LINEAR	·	1.9 km	MPC · JPL
28545	2000 ED_{20}	—	March 7, 2000	Višnjan Observatory	K. Korlević	PHO	2.7 km	MPC · JPL
28546	2000 EE_{20}	—	March 7, 2000	Višnjan Observatory	K. Korlević	VER	17 km	MPC · JPL
28547 Johannschröter	2000 EB_{21}	Johannschröter	March 3, 2000	Catalina	CSS	·	2.0 km	MPC · JPL
28548	2000 EY_{25}	—	March 8, 2000	Kitt Peak	Spacewatch	·	2.7 km	MPC · JPL
28549	2000 EZ_{25}	—	March 8, 2000	Kitt Peak	Spacewatch	·	5.0 km	MPC · JPL
28550	2000 EC_{26}	—	March 8, 2000	Kitt Peak	Spacewatch	·	3.3 km	MPC · JPL
28551 Paulomi	2000 EO_{36}	Paulomi	March 8, 2000	Socorro	LINEAR	NYS	4.2 km	MPC · JPL
28552	2000 EY_{38}	—	March 8, 2000	Socorro	LINEAR	slow	8.5 km	MPC · JPL
28553 Bhupatiraju	2000 ED_{39}	Bhupatiraju	March 8, 2000	Socorro	LINEAR	·	1.9 km	MPC · JPL
28554 Adambowman	2000 EB_{41}	Adambowman	March 8, 2000	Socorro	LINEAR	·	3.3 km	MPC · JPL
28555 Jenniferchan	2000 EM_{41}	Jenniferchan	March 8, 2000	Socorro	LINEAR	·	2.2 km	MPC · JPL
28556 Kevinchen	2000 EP_{41}	Kevinchen	March 8, 2000	Socorro	LINEAR	·	4.5 km	MPC · JPL
28557 Lillianchin	2000 EY_{43}	Lillianchin	March 8, 2000	Socorro	LINEAR	·	2.9 km	MPC · JPL
28558 Kathcordwell	2000 EV_{44}	Kathcordwell	March 9, 2000	Socorro	LINEAR	·	4.5 km	MPC · JPL
28559 Anniedai	2000 ET_{46}	Anniedai	March 9, 2000	Socorro	LINEAR	V	2.8 km	MPC · JPL
28560	2000 EO_{48}	—	March 9, 2000	Socorro	LINEAR	slow	4.6 km	MPC · JPL
28561	2000 EP_{48}	—	March 9, 2000	Socorro	LINEAR	THM	8.6 km	MPC · JPL
28562	2000 ET_{48}	—	March 9, 2000	Socorro	LINEAR	·	5.8 km	MPC · JPL
28563 Dantzler	2000 EF_{57}	Dantzler	March 8, 2000	Socorro	LINEAR	·	2.1 km	MPC · JPL
28564 Gunderman	2000 EV_{57}	Gunderman	March 8, 2000	Socorro	LINEAR	·	2.9 km	MPC · JPL
28565	2000 EO_{58}	—	March 8, 2000	Socorro	LINEAR	·	2.7 km	MPC · JPL
28566	2000 EV_{59}	—	March 10, 2000	Socorro	LINEAR	·	1.9 km	MPC · JPL
28567	2000 EA_{61}	—	March 10, 2000	Socorro	LINEAR	·	3.3 km	MPC · JPL
28568 Jacobjohnson	2000 EU_{64}	Jacobjohnson	March 10, 2000	Socorro	LINEAR	·	2.6 km	MPC · JPL
28569 Kallenbach	2000 ES_{67}	Kallenbach	March 10, 2000	Socorro	LINEAR	·	1.9 km	MPC · JPL
28570 Peterkraft	2000 EW_{75}	Peterkraft	March 5, 2000	Socorro	LINEAR	(2076)	2.0 km	MPC · JPL
28571 Hannahlarson	2000 EZ_{76}	Hannahlarson	March 5, 2000	Socorro	LINEAR	·	2.4 km	MPC · JPL
28572 Salebreton	2000 EH_{79}	Salebreton	March 5, 2000	Socorro	LINEAR	·	4.4 km	MPC · JPL
28573	2000 EG_{81}	—	March 5, 2000	Socorro	LINEAR	·	3.5 km	MPC · JPL
28574	2000 EV_{88}	—	March 9, 2000	Socorro	LINEAR	·	2.8 km	MPC · JPL
28575 McQuaid	2000 ES_{95}	McQuaid	March 10, 2000	Socorro	LINEAR	·	4.5 km	MPC · JPL
28576	2000 EP_{96}	—	March 12, 2000	Socorro	LINEAR	·	6.2 km	MPC · JPL
28577	2000 EW_{96}	—	March 10, 2000	Socorro	LINEAR	EUN	5.2 km	MPC · JPL
28578	2000 EE_{97}	—	March 10, 2000	Socorro	LINEAR	V	2.9 km	MPC · JPL
28579	2000 EQ_{97}	—	March 10, 2000	Socorro	LINEAR	·	3.7 km	MPC · JPL
28580	2000 EJ_{104}	—	March 14, 2000	Višnjan Observatory	K. Korlević	·	3.3 km	MPC · JPL
28581 Dyerlytle	2000 ER_{105}	Dyerlytle	March 11, 2000	Anderson Mesa	LONEOS	slow	2.1 km	MPC · JPL
28582 Haileyosborn	2000 EB_{106}	Haileyosborn	March 11, 2000	Anderson Mesa	LONEOS	·	4.4 km	MPC · JPL
28583 Mehrotra	2000 EJ_{108}	Mehrotra	March 8, 2000	Socorro	LINEAR	·	3.1 km	MPC · JPL
28584	2000 ER_{110}	—	March 8, 2000	Haleakala	NEAT	NYS	3.4 km	MPC · JPL
28585	2000 EY_{110}	—	March 8, 2000	Haleakala	NEAT	·	3.3 km	MPC · JPL
28586	2000 EB_{113}	—	March 9, 2000	Socorro	LINEAR	THM	8.0 km	MPC · JPL
28587 Mundkur	2000 EG_{114}	Mundkur	March 9, 2000	Socorro	LINEAR	V	2.7 km	MPC · JPL
28588	2000 EL_{114}	—	March 9, 2000	Socorro	LINEAR	·	10 km	MPC · JPL
28589 Nisley	2000 EL_{126}	Nisley	March 11, 2000	Anderson Mesa	LONEOS	·	2.1 km	MPC · JPL
28590 Kyledilger	2000 EX_{126}	Kyledilger	March 11, 2000	Anderson Mesa	LONEOS	·	2.6 km	MPC · JPL
28591 Racheldilger	2000 EC_{130}	Racheldilger	March 11, 2000	Anderson Mesa	LONEOS	·	4.1 km	MPC · JPL
28592 O'Leary	2000 EP_{131}	O'Leary	March 11, 2000	Socorro	LINEAR	·	3.6 km	MPC · JPL
28593 Ryanhamilton	2000 EZ_{133}	Ryanhamilton	March 11, 2000	Anderson Mesa	LONEOS	EOS	5.2 km	MPC · JPL
28594 Ronaldballouz	2000 EF_{134}	Ronaldballouz	March 11, 2000	Anderson Mesa	LONEOS	DOR	11 km	MPC · JPL
28595	2000 EP_{136}	—	March 12, 2000	Socorro	LINEAR	EOS	6.0 km	MPC · JPL
28596	2000 EK_{137}	—	March 7, 2000	Socorro	LINEAR	·	3.4 km	MPC · JPL
28597	2000 ER_{137}	—	March 9, 2000	Socorro	LINEAR	·	5.5 km	MPC · JPL
28598 Apadmanabha	2000 EU_{137}	Apadmanabha	March 9, 2000	Socorro	LINEAR	·	3.5 km	MPC · JPL
28599 Terenzoni	2000 EQ_{138}	Terenzoni	March 11, 2000	Catalina	CSS	EUN · slow	4.0 km	MPC · JPL
28600 Georgelucas	2000 EO_{141}	Georgelucas	March 2, 2000	Catalina	CSS	V	2.2 km	MPC · JPL

== 28601–28700 ==
back to top

Designation			Discovery			Properties		Ref
Permanent	Provisional	Named after	Date	Site	Discoverer(s)	Category	Diam.	Ref
28601 Benton	2000 EK_{147}	Benton	March 4, 2000	Catalina	CSS	·	2.9 km	MPC · JPL
28602 Westfall	2000 EL_{147}	Westfall	March 4, 2000	Catalina	CSS	·	3.6 km	MPC · JPL
28603 Jenkins	2000 EW_{148}	Jenkins	March 4, 2000	Catalina	CSS	·	4.0 km	MPC · JPL
28604	2000 EB_{151}	—	March 5, 2000	Haleakala	NEAT	·	9.1 km	MPC · JPL
28605	2000 ER_{152}	—	March 6, 2000	Haleakala	NEAT	·	3.0 km	MPC · JPL
28606	2000 ES_{154}	—	March 6, 2000	Haleakala	NEAT	V	2.2 km	MPC · JPL
28607 Jiayipeng	2000 EG_{156}	Jiayipeng	March 9, 2000	Socorro	LINEAR	·	3.1 km	MPC · JPL
28608 Sblomquist	2000 EU_{157}	Sblomquist	March 12, 2000	Anderson Mesa	LONEOS	·	4.6 km	MPC · JPL
28609 Tsirvoulis	2000 EL_{158}	Tsirvoulis	March 12, 2000	Anderson Mesa	LONEOS	·	6.4 km	MPC · JPL
28610 Stephenriggs	2000 EM_{158}	Stephenriggs	March 12, 2000	Anderson Mesa	LONEOS	·	14 km	MPC · JPL
28611 Liliapopova	2000 EW_{169}	Liliapopova	March 5, 2000	Socorro	LINEAR	·	2.4 km	MPC · JPL
28612	2000 FE_{2}	—	March 25, 2000	Kitt Peak	Spacewatch	·	6.7 km	MPC · JPL
28613	2000 FG_{5}	—	March 29, 2000	Oizumi	T. Kobayashi	·	7.4 km	MPC · JPL
28614 Vejvoda	2000 FO_{8}	Vejvoda	March 25, 2000	Kleť	Kleť	·	3.4 km	MPC · JPL
28615	2000 FS_{10}	—	March 31, 2000	Reedy Creek	J. Broughton	·	5.0 km	MPC · JPL
28616	2000 FD_{11}	—	March 28, 2000	Socorro	LINEAR	·	5.0 km	MPC · JPL
28617	2000 FB_{13}	—	March 29, 2000	Socorro	LINEAR	(1118)	12 km	MPC · JPL
28618 Scibelli	2000 FK_{17}	Scibelli	March 29, 2000	Socorro	LINEAR	·	3.0 km	MPC · JPL
28619	2000 FP_{24}	—	March 29, 2000	Socorro	LINEAR	·	12 km	MPC · JPL
28620 Anicia	2000 FE_{26}	Anicia	March 27, 2000	Anderson Mesa	LONEOS	slow	8.1 km	MPC · JPL
28621 Marcfries	2000 FZ_{28}	Marcfries	March 27, 2000	Anderson Mesa	LONEOS	·	3.2 km	MPC · JPL
28622 Gabadirwe	2000 FJ_{29}	Gabadirwe	March 27, 2000	Anderson Mesa	LONEOS	·	3.6 km	MPC · JPL
28623 Olivermoses	2000 FX_{29}	Olivermoses	March 27, 2000	Anderson Mesa	LONEOS	·	3.3 km	MPC · JPL
28624	2000 FM_{31}	—	March 28, 2000	Socorro	LINEAR	·	2.9 km	MPC · JPL
28625 Selvakumar	2000 FQ_{32}	Selvakumar	March 29, 2000	Socorro	LINEAR	·	3.5 km	MPC · JPL
28626 Meghanshea	2000 FR_{32}	Meghanshea	March 29, 2000	Socorro	LINEAR	·	4.1 km	MPC · JPL
28627	2000 FH_{33}	—	March 29, 2000	Socorro	LINEAR	·	7.5 km	MPC · JPL
28628 Kensenshi	2000 FF_{34}	Kensenshi	March 29, 2000	Socorro	LINEAR	·	8.2 km	MPC · JPL
28629 Solimano	2000 FT_{34}	Solimano	March 29, 2000	Socorro	LINEAR	·	2.3 km	MPC · JPL
28630 Mayuri	2000 FK_{35}	Mayuri	March 29, 2000	Socorro	LINEAR	·	1.7 km	MPC · JPL
28631 Jacktakahashi	2000 FX_{36}	Jacktakahashi	March 29, 2000	Socorro	LINEAR	THM	8.0 km	MPC · JPL
28632 Christraver	2000 FF_{37}	Christraver	March 29, 2000	Socorro	LINEAR	(5)	3.5 km	MPC · JPL
28633 Ratripathi	2000 FK_{37}	Ratripathi	March 29, 2000	Socorro	LINEAR	·	2.1 km	MPC · JPL
28634	2000 FR_{39}	—	March 29, 2000	Socorro	LINEAR	·	4.8 km	MPC · JPL
28635	2000 FV_{42}	—	March 28, 2000	Socorro	LINEAR	·	4.2 km	MPC · JPL
28636 Vasudevan	2000 FK_{45}	Vasudevan	March 29, 2000	Socorro	LINEAR	·	3.3 km	MPC · JPL
28637	2000 FB_{48}	—	March 29, 2000	Socorro	LINEAR	·	5.8 km	MPC · JPL
28638 Joywang	2000 FE_{49}	Joywang	March 30, 2000	Socorro	LINEAR	MIS	6.1 km	MPC · JPL
28639	2000 FK_{49}	—	March 30, 2000	Socorro	LINEAR	EOS	6.0 km	MPC · JPL
28640 Cathywong	2000 FQ_{49}	Cathywong	March 30, 2000	Socorro	LINEAR	·	4.8 km	MPC · JPL
28641	2000 FS_{49}	—	March 30, 2000	Socorro	LINEAR	DOR	8.5 km	MPC · JPL
28642 Zbarsky	2000 FZ_{49}	Zbarsky	March 30, 2000	Socorro	LINEAR	·	1.9 km	MPC · JPL
28643 Kellyzhang	2000 FB_{50}	Kellyzhang	March 30, 2000	Socorro	LINEAR	·	6.2 km	MPC · JPL
28644 Michaelzhang	2000 FD_{56}	Michaelzhang	March 29, 2000	Socorro	LINEAR	·	2.0 km	MPC · JPL
28645	2000 FP_{56}	—	March 29, 2000	Socorro	LINEAR	·	5.5 km	MPC · JPL
28646 Alemran	2000 FO_{62}	Alemran	March 26, 2000	Anderson Mesa	LONEOS	·	3.0 km	MPC · JPL
28647	2000 GW	—	April 2, 2000	Kitt Peak	Spacewatch	(5)	3.5 km	MPC · JPL
28648	2000 GY	—	April 2, 2000	Kitt Peak	Spacewatch	·	3.1 km	MPC · JPL
28649	2000 GZ_{1}	—	April 4, 2000	Fountain Hills	C. W. Juels	·	4.5 km	MPC · JPL
28650	2000 GE_{8}	—	April 5, 2000	Socorro	LINEAR	EOS	7.5 km	MPC · JPL
28651	2000 GP_{8}	—	April 5, 2000	Socorro	LINEAR	·	5.2 km	MPC · JPL
28652 Andybramante	2000 GM_{15}	Andybramante	April 5, 2000	Socorro	LINEAR	·	1.6 km	MPC · JPL
28653 Charliebrucker	2000 GC_{16}	Charliebrucker	April 5, 2000	Socorro	LINEAR	·	2.6 km	MPC · JPL
28654 Davidcaine	2000 GY_{20}	Davidcaine	April 5, 2000	Socorro	LINEAR	·	2.9 km	MPC · JPL
28655 Erincolfax	2000 GY_{25}	Erincolfax	April 5, 2000	Socorro	LINEAR	·	2.2 km	MPC · JPL
28656 Doreencurtin	2000 GH_{28}	Doreencurtin	April 5, 2000	Socorro	LINEAR	·	3.0 km	MPC · JPL
28657 Briandempsey	2000 GM_{28}	Briandempsey	April 5, 2000	Socorro	LINEAR	·	2.1 km	MPC · JPL
28658	2000 GC_{30}	—	April 5, 2000	Socorro	LINEAR	·	7.7 km	MPC · JPL
28659	2000 GB_{36}	—	April 5, 2000	Socorro	LINEAR	KOR	5.2 km	MPC · JPL
28660 Derbes	2000 GP_{38}	Derbes	April 5, 2000	Socorro	LINEAR	(5)	4.0 km	MPC · JPL
28661 Jimdickens	2000 GE_{39}	Jimdickens	April 5, 2000	Socorro	LINEAR	KOR	3.8 km	MPC · JPL
28662 Ericduran	2000 GL_{39}	Ericduran	April 5, 2000	Socorro	LINEAR	·	4.3 km	MPC · JPL
28663	2000 GH_{43}	—	April 5, 2000	Socorro	LINEAR	(3460)	10 km	MPC · JPL
28664 Maryellenfay	2000 GV_{48}	Maryellenfay	April 5, 2000	Socorro	LINEAR	·	1.8 km	MPC · JPL
28665 Theresafultz	2000 GN_{51}	Theresafultz	April 5, 2000	Socorro	LINEAR	KOR	3.4 km	MPC · JPL
28666 Trudygessler	2000 GO_{51}	Trudygessler	April 5, 2000	Socorro	LINEAR	·	1.9 km	MPC · JPL
28667 Whithagins	2000 GW_{53}	Whithagins	April 5, 2000	Socorro	LINEAR	·	4.5 km	MPC · JPL
28668	2000 GF_{54}	—	April 5, 2000	Socorro	LINEAR	·	2.9 km	MPC · JPL
28669 Bradhelsel	2000 GG_{55}	Bradhelsel	April 5, 2000	Socorro	LINEAR	·	1.6 km	MPC · JPL
28670	2000 GO_{55}	—	April 5, 2000	Socorro	LINEAR	·	9.1 km	MPC · JPL
28671	2000 GW_{55}	—	April 5, 2000	Socorro	LINEAR	THM	7.9 km	MPC · JPL
28672 Karolhiggins	2000 GH_{56}	Karolhiggins	April 5, 2000	Socorro	LINEAR	·	3.0 km	MPC · JPL
28673 Valholmes	2000 GT_{56}	Valholmes	April 5, 2000	Socorro	LINEAR	·	2.5 km	MPC · JPL
28674	2000 GZ_{59}	—	April 5, 2000	Socorro	LINEAR	·	2.0 km	MPC · JPL
28675 Suejohnston	2000 GB_{60}	Suejohnston	April 5, 2000	Socorro	LINEAR	·	7.0 km	MPC · JPL
28676 Bethkoester	2000 GK_{66}	Bethkoester	April 5, 2000	Socorro	LINEAR	·	2.8 km	MPC · JPL
28677 Laurakowalski	2000 GO_{66}	Laurakowalski	April 5, 2000	Socorro	LINEAR	·	2.6 km	MPC · JPL
28678 Lindquester	2000 GN_{67}	Lindquester	April 5, 2000	Socorro	LINEAR	·	3.8 km	MPC · JPL
28679	2000 GY_{68}	—	April 5, 2000	Socorro	LINEAR	·	5.0 km	MPC · JPL
28680 Sandralitvin	2000 GA_{69}	Sandralitvin	April 5, 2000	Socorro	LINEAR	NYS · slow	2.5 km	MPC · JPL
28681 Loseke	2000 GH_{70}	Loseke	April 5, 2000	Socorro	LINEAR	·	2.8 km	MPC · JPL
28682 Newhams	2000 GQ_{70}	Newhams	April 5, 2000	Socorro	LINEAR	·	3.1 km	MPC · JPL
28683 Victorostrik	2000 GV_{70}	Victorostrik	April 5, 2000	Socorro	LINEAR	·	3.5 km	MPC · JPL
28684	2000 GK_{72}	—	April 5, 2000	Socorro	LINEAR	·	6.7 km	MPC · JPL
28685	2000 GU_{72}	—	April 5, 2000	Socorro	LINEAR	·	8.5 km	MPC · JPL
28686 Tamsenprofit	2000 GK_{74}	Tamsenprofit	April 5, 2000	Socorro	LINEAR	·	3.8 km	MPC · JPL
28687 Reginareals	2000 GP_{74}	Reginareals	April 5, 2000	Socorro	LINEAR	KOR	3.5 km	MPC · JPL
28688 Diannerister	2000 GQ_{74}	Diannerister	April 5, 2000	Socorro	LINEAR	·	7.2 km	MPC · JPL
28689 Rohrback	2000 GA_{75}	Rohrback	April 5, 2000	Socorro	LINEAR	AGN	2.6 km	MPC · JPL
28690 Beshellem	2000 GT_{75}	Beshellem	April 5, 2000	Socorro	LINEAR	MAS	2.8 km	MPC · JPL
28691	2000 GC_{76}	—	April 5, 2000	Socorro	LINEAR	·	8.7 km	MPC · JPL
28692 Chanleysmall	2000 GA_{78}	Chanleysmall	April 5, 2000	Socorro	LINEAR	KOR	4.0 km	MPC · JPL
28693	2000 GS_{79}	—	April 5, 2000	Socorro	LINEAR	V	2.1 km	MPC · JPL
28694	2000 GJ_{85}	—	April 3, 2000	Socorro	LINEAR	·	8.8 km	MPC · JPL
28695 Zwanzig	2000 GP_{86}	Zwanzig	April 4, 2000	Socorro	LINEAR	·	2.0 km	MPC · JPL
28696	2000 GU_{87}	—	April 4, 2000	Socorro	LINEAR	·	12 km	MPC · JPL
28697 Eitanacks	2000 GZ_{88}	Eitanacks	April 4, 2000	Socorro	LINEAR	AGN	3.8 km	MPC · JPL
28698 Aakshi	2000 GF_{89}	Aakshi	April 4, 2000	Socorro	LINEAR	·	2.3 km	MPC · JPL
28699	2000 GN_{89}	—	April 4, 2000	Socorro	LINEAR	DOR	9.1 km	MPC · JPL
28700 Balachandar	2000 GB_{90}	Balachandar	April 4, 2000	Socorro	LINEAR	·	2.9 km	MPC · JPL

== 28701–28800 ==
back to top

Designation			Discovery			Properties		Ref
Permanent	Provisional	Named after	Date	Site	Discoverer(s)	Category	Diam.	Ref
28701	2000 GK_{90}	—	April 4, 2000	Socorro	LINEAR	·	8.2 km	MPC · JPL
28702	2000 GH_{91}	—	April 4, 2000	Socorro	LINEAR	·	6.3 km	MPC · JPL
28703	2000 GM_{91}	—	April 4, 2000	Socorro	LINEAR	EOS	5.8 km	MPC · JPL
28704	2000 GU_{91}	—	April 4, 2000	Socorro	LINEAR	·	5.2 km	MPC · JPL
28705 Michaelbecker	2000 GW_{91}	Michaelbecker	April 4, 2000	Socorro	LINEAR	·	3.5 km	MPC · JPL
28706	2000 GC_{93}	—	April 5, 2000	Socorro	LINEAR	·	3.3 km	MPC · JPL
28707 Drewbecker	2000 GZ_{94}	Drewbecker	April 6, 2000	Socorro	LINEAR	KOR	3.0 km	MPC · JPL
28708	2000 GR_{95}	—	April 6, 2000	Socorro	LINEAR	VER	10 km	MPC · JPL
28709	2000 GY_{96}	—	April 6, 2000	Socorro	LINEAR	·	10 km	MPC · JPL
28710 Rebeccab	2000 GY_{100}	Rebeccab	April 7, 2000	Socorro	LINEAR	V	2.2 km	MPC · JPL
28711 Oliverburnett	2000 GE_{101}	Oliverburnett	April 7, 2000	Socorro	LINEAR	·	3.2 km	MPC · JPL
28712 Elizabethcorn	2000 GT_{102}	Elizabethcorn	April 7, 2000	Socorro	LINEAR	·	5.1 km	MPC · JPL
28713	2000 GW_{102}	—	April 7, 2000	Socorro	LINEAR	·	3.6 km	MPC · JPL
28714 Gandall	2000 GY_{102}	Gandall	April 7, 2000	Socorro	LINEAR	·	2.6 km	MPC · JPL
28715 Garimella	2000 GW_{103}	Garimella	April 7, 2000	Socorro	LINEAR	·	4.7 km	MPC · JPL
28716 Calebgonser	2000 GP_{104}	Calebgonser	April 7, 2000	Socorro	LINEAR	·	3.0 km	MPC · JPL
28717	2000 GT_{106}	—	April 7, 2000	Socorro	LINEAR	MAR ·	3.5 km	MPC · JPL
28718 Rivergrace	2000 GH_{107}	Rivergrace	April 7, 2000	Socorro	LINEAR	·	2.4 km	MPC · JPL
28719 Sahoolahan	2000 GN_{107}	Sahoolahan	April 7, 2000	Socorro	LINEAR	MAS	2.5 km	MPC · JPL
28720 Krystalrose	2000 GV_{107}	Krystalrose	April 7, 2000	Socorro	LINEAR	·	3.6 km	MPC · JPL
28721	2000 GW_{107}	—	April 7, 2000	Socorro	LINEAR	·	7.1 km	MPC · JPL
28722 Dhruviyer	2000 GN_{108}	Dhruviyer	April 7, 2000	Socorro	LINEAR	·	4.3 km	MPC · JPL
28723 Cameronjones	2000 GX_{108}	Cameronjones	April 7, 2000	Socorro	LINEAR	·	2.4 km	MPC · JPL
28724 Stott	2000 GG_{111}	Stott	April 2, 2000	Anderson Mesa	LONEOS	·	2.4 km	MPC · JPL
28725	2000 GB_{113}	—	April 5, 2000	Socorro	LINEAR	·	4.6 km	MPC · JPL
28726 Kailey-Steiner	2000 GM_{113}	Kailey-Steiner	April 6, 2000	Socorro	LINEAR	·	3.2 km	MPC · JPL
28727	2000 GO_{113}	—	April 6, 2000	Socorro	LINEAR	·	4.2 km	MPC · JPL
28728	2000 GX_{121}	—	April 6, 2000	Kitt Peak	Spacewatch	·	5.1 km	MPC · JPL
28729 Moivre	2000 GF_{123}	Moivre	April 11, 2000	Prescott	P. G. Comba	·	3.7 km	MPC · JPL
28730	2000 GU_{123}	—	April 7, 2000	Socorro	LINEAR	EMA	9.4 km	MPC · JPL
28731	2000 GX_{123}	—	April 7, 2000	Socorro	LINEAR	EUN	4.2 km	MPC · JPL
28732 Rheakamat	2000 GF_{124}	Rheakamat	April 7, 2000	Socorro	LINEAR	·	4.9 km	MPC · JPL
28733	2000 GY_{124}	—	April 7, 2000	Socorro	LINEAR	·	4.6 km	MPC · JPL
28734 Austinmccoy	2000 GK_{125}	Austinmccoy	April 7, 2000	Socorro	LINEAR	·	2.8 km	MPC · JPL
28735	2000 GX_{125}	—	April 7, 2000	Socorro	LINEAR	V	3.5 km	MPC · JPL
28736	2000 GE_{133}	—	April 12, 2000	Haleakala	NEAT	·	6.4 km	MPC · JPL
28737 Mohindra	2000 GR_{133}	Mohindra	April 7, 2000	Socorro	LINEAR	V	3.0 km	MPC · JPL
28738 Carolinolan	2000 GQ_{135}	Carolinolan	April 8, 2000	Socorro	LINEAR	·	3.0 km	MPC · JPL
28739 Julisauer	2000 GW_{135}	Julisauer	April 8, 2000	Socorro	LINEAR	·	7.0 km	MPC · JPL
28740 Nathansperry	2000 GZ_{135}	Nathansperry	April 12, 2000	Socorro	LINEAR	PAD	6.6 km	MPC · JPL
28741	2000 GJ_{136}	—	April 12, 2000	Socorro	LINEAR	·	6.6 km	MPC · JPL
28742 Hannahsteele	2000 GA_{137}	Hannahsteele	April 12, 2000	Socorro	LINEAR	V	2.4 km	MPC · JPL
28743 Schuitemaker	2000 GO_{142}	Schuitemaker	April 7, 2000	Anderson Mesa	LONEOS	GEF	5.8 km	MPC · JPL
28744 Annikagustafsson	2000 GK_{143}	Annikagustafsson	April 7, 2000	Anderson Mesa	LONEOS	·	3.6 km	MPC · JPL
28745	2000 GV_{144}	—	April 7, 2000	Kitt Peak	Spacewatch	·	1.8 km	MPC · JPL
28746	2000 GB_{148}	—	April 5, 2000	Socorro	LINEAR	NYS	2.8 km	MPC · JPL
28747 Swintosky	2000 GF_{151}	Swintosky	April 5, 2000	Socorro	LINEAR	KOR	2.8 km	MPC · JPL
28748	2000 GH_{161}	—	April 7, 2000	Socorro	LINEAR	·	5.0 km	MPC · JPL
28749	2000 GP_{161}	—	April 7, 2000	Socorro	LINEAR	V	3.0 km	MPC · JPL
28750 Brennawallin	2000 GN_{165}	Brennawallin	April 5, 2000	Socorro	LINEAR	·	2.8 km	MPC · JPL
28751 Eggl	2000 GT_{167}	Eggl	April 4, 2000	Anderson Mesa	LONEOS	·	2.4 km	MPC · JPL
28752	2000 GZ_{176}	—	April 3, 2000	Kitt Peak	Spacewatch	·	1.9 km	MPC · JPL
28753	2000 HA	—	April 18, 2000	Modra	L. Kornoš, Š. Gajdoš	PHO	4.9 km	MPC · JPL
28754	2000 HV_{1}	—	April 25, 2000	Višnjan Observatory	K. Korlević	·	15 km	MPC · JPL
28755	2000 HK_{4}	—	April 27, 2000	Kitt Peak	Spacewatch	KOR	3.7 km	MPC · JPL
28756	2000 HA_{6}	—	April 24, 2000	Kitt Peak	Spacewatch	·	7.3 km	MPC · JPL
28757 Seanweber	2000 HQ_{9}	Seanweber	April 27, 2000	Socorro	LINEAR	·	7.6 km	MPC · JPL
28758	2000 HE_{10}	—	April 27, 2000	Socorro	LINEAR	THM	11 km	MPC · JPL
28759 Joshwentzel	2000 HD_{11}	Joshwentzel	April 27, 2000	Socorro	LINEAR	·	3.3 km	MPC · JPL
28760 Grantwomble	2000 HN_{12}	Grantwomble	April 28, 2000	Socorro	LINEAR	·	3.3 km	MPC · JPL
28761	2000 HU_{12}	—	April 28, 2000	Socorro	LINEAR	·	3.8 km	MPC · JPL
28762	2000 HG_{13}	—	April 28, 2000	Socorro	LINEAR	·	6.4 km	MPC · JPL
28763	2000 HK_{13}	—	April 28, 2000	Socorro	LINEAR	THM	9.6 km	MPC · JPL
28764	2000 HS_{13}	—	April 28, 2000	Socorro	LINEAR	·	7.2 km	MPC · JPL
28765 Katherinewu	2000 HY_{13}	Katherinewu	April 28, 2000	Socorro	LINEAR	·	3.1 km	MPC · JPL
28766 Monge	2000 HP_{14}	Monge	April 29, 2000	Prescott	P. G. Comba	·	10 km	MPC · JPL
28767	2000 HA_{17}	—	April 24, 2000	Kitt Peak	Spacewatch	MAS	1.8 km	MPC · JPL
28768	2000 HP_{21}	—	April 28, 2000	Socorro	LINEAR	·	4.7 km	MPC · JPL
28769 Elisabethadams	2000 HC_{26}	Elisabethadams	April 24, 2000	Anderson Mesa	LONEOS	·	3.0 km	MPC · JPL
28770 Sarahrines	2000 HC_{27}	Sarahrines	April 27, 2000	Socorro	LINEAR	·	3.1 km	MPC · JPL
28771	2000 HF_{32}	—	April 29, 2000	Socorro	LINEAR	·	2.2 km	MPC · JPL
28772 Bonamico	2000 HE_{34}	Bonamico	April 25, 2000	Anderson Mesa	LONEOS	·	6.1 km	MPC · JPL
28773	2000 HU_{35}	—	April 28, 2000	Socorro	LINEAR	EOS	10 km	MPC · JPL
28774	2000 HO_{36}	—	April 28, 2000	Socorro	LINEAR	EUN	3.6 km	MPC · JPL
28775	2000 HE_{37}	—	April 28, 2000	Socorro	LINEAR	·	13 km	MPC · JPL
28776	2000 HC_{41}	—	April 28, 2000	Socorro	LINEAR	EUN	4.9 km	MPC · JPL
28777	2000 HK_{41}	—	April 28, 2000	Socorro	LINEAR	·	4.0 km	MPC · JPL
28778 Michdelucia	2000 HG_{46}	Michdelucia	April 29, 2000	Socorro	LINEAR	AGN	3.2 km	MPC · JPL
28779 Acthieke	2000 HV_{46}	Acthieke	April 29, 2000	Socorro	LINEAR	·	2.6 km	MPC · JPL
28780 Lisadeaver	2000 HD_{47}	Lisadeaver	April 29, 2000	Socorro	LINEAR	·	2.3 km	MPC · JPL
28781 Timothylohr	2000 HS_{48}	Timothylohr	April 29, 2000	Socorro	LINEAR	·	5.1 km	MPC · JPL
28782 Mechling	2000 HE_{49}	Mechling	April 29, 2000	Socorro	LINEAR	·	1.9 km	MPC · JPL
28783	2000 HH_{49}	—	April 29, 2000	Socorro	LINEAR	NYS	4.0 km	MPC · JPL
28784 Deringer	2000 HT_{51}	Deringer	April 29, 2000	Socorro	LINEAR	KOR	4.7 km	MPC · JPL
28785 Woodjohn	2000 HN_{52}	Woodjohn	April 29, 2000	Socorro	LINEAR	·	4.8 km	MPC · JPL
28786	2000 HA_{54}	—	April 29, 2000	Socorro	LINEAR	·	4.9 km	MPC · JPL
28787 Peterpinko	2000 HR_{54}	Peterpinko	April 29, 2000	Socorro	LINEAR	·	4.1 km	MPC · JPL
28788 Hayes-Gehrke	2000 HW_{57}	Hayes-Gehrke	April 24, 2000	Anderson Mesa	LONEOS	NYS	3.8 km	MPC · JPL
28789	2000 HE_{58}	—	April 24, 2000	Kitt Peak	Spacewatch	THM	5.8 km	MPC · JPL
28790	2000 HK_{58}	—	April 24, 2000	Kitt Peak	Spacewatch	·	3.6 km	MPC · JPL
28791 Edithsykeslowell	2000 HW_{59}	Edithsykeslowell	April 25, 2000	Anderson Mesa	LONEOS	·	5.7 km	MPC · JPL
28792 Davidlowell	2000 HE_{61}	Davidlowell	April 25, 2000	Anderson Mesa	LONEOS	·	3.3 km	MPC · JPL
28793 Donaldpaul	2000 HM_{61}	Donaldpaul	April 25, 2000	Anderson Mesa	LONEOS	·	5.3 km	MPC · JPL
28794 Crowley	2000 HG_{64}	Crowley	April 26, 2000	Anderson Mesa	LONEOS	·	2.6 km	MPC · JPL
28795 Alexelbert	2000 HO_{64}	Alexelbert	April 26, 2000	Anderson Mesa	LONEOS	·	2.9 km	MPC · JPL
28796 Ragozzine	2000 HW_{65}	Ragozzine	April 26, 2000	Anderson Mesa	LONEOS	·	6.2 km	MPC · JPL
28797	2000 HH_{68}	—	April 27, 2000	Socorro	LINEAR	EOS	5.2 km	MPC · JPL
28798 Audreymartin	2000 HJ_{69}	Audreymartin	April 25, 2000	Anderson Mesa	LONEOS	·	7.9 km	MPC · JPL
28799 Christopherford	2000 HB_{72}	Christopherford	April 25, 2000	Anderson Mesa	LONEOS	·	2.7 km	MPC · JPL
28800 Speth	2000 HV_{75}	Speth	April 27, 2000	Socorro	LINEAR	·	3.6 km	MPC · JPL

== 28801–28900 ==
back to top

Designation			Discovery			Properties		Ref
Permanent	Provisional	Named after	Date	Site	Discoverer(s)	Category	Diam.	Ref
28801 Maryanderson	2000 HJ_{76}	Maryanderson	April 27, 2000	Socorro	LINEAR	·	2.9 km	MPC · JPL
28802 Boborino	2000 HX_{77}	Boborino	April 28, 2000	Socorro	LINEAR	·	3.7 km	MPC · JPL
28803 Roe	2000 HR_{79}	Roe	April 28, 2000	Anderson Mesa	LONEOS	MAR	2.8 km	MPC · JPL
28804	2000 HC_{81}	—	April 28, 2000	Socorro	LINEAR	(5)	4.3 km	MPC · JPL
28805 Föhring	2000 HY_{85}	Föhring	April 30, 2000	Anderson Mesa	LONEOS	·	3.5 km	MPC · JPL
28806	2000 HH_{87}	—	April 30, 2000	Haleakala	NEAT	EUN	3.7 km	MPC · JPL
28807 Lisawaller	2000 HC_{90}	Lisawaller	April 29, 2000	Socorro	LINEAR	·	2.5 km	MPC · JPL
28808 Ananthnarayan	2000 HO_{96}	Ananthnarayan	April 28, 2000	Socorro	LINEAR	·	5.4 km	MPC · JPL
28809 Pierrebeck	2000 HY_{102}	Pierrebeck	April 27, 2000	Anderson Mesa	LONEOS	·	3.4 km	MPC · JPL
28810 Suchandler	2000 JS_{5}	Suchandler	May 1, 2000	Socorro	LINEAR	·	6.3 km	MPC · JPL
28811	2000 JX_{9}	—	May 4, 2000	Socorro	LINEAR	·	11 km	MPC · JPL
28812	2000 JS_{11}	—	May 3, 2000	Socorro	LINEAR	·	3.0 km	MPC · JPL
28813 Jeffreykurtz	2000 JV_{14}	Jeffreykurtz	May 6, 2000	Socorro	LINEAR	·	7.3 km	MPC · JPL
28814	2000 JA_{17}	—	May 5, 2000	Socorro	LINEAR	DOR	8.6 km	MPC · JPL
28815	2000 JS_{17}	—	May 6, 2000	Socorro	LINEAR	·	8.5 km	MPC · JPL
28816 Kimneville	2000 JC_{18}	Kimneville	May 6, 2000	Socorro	LINEAR	NYS	2.3 km	MPC · JPL
28817 Simoneflood	2000 JJ_{20}	Simoneflood	May 6, 2000	Socorro	LINEAR	·	3.0 km	MPC · JPL
28818 Kellyryan	2000 JQ_{20}	Kellyryan	May 6, 2000	Socorro	LINEAR	·	2.8 km	MPC · JPL
28819 Karinritchey	2000 JX_{20}	Karinritchey	May 6, 2000	Socorro	LINEAR	V	3.2 km	MPC · JPL
28820 Sylrobertson	2000 JJ_{24}	Sylrobertson	May 7, 2000	Socorro	LINEAR	·	3.7 km	MPC · JPL
28821 Harryanselmo	2000 JV_{24}	Harryanselmo	May 7, 2000	Socorro	LINEAR	·	2.6 km	MPC · JPL
28822 Angelabarker	2000 JW_{25}	Angelabarker	May 7, 2000	Socorro	LINEAR	·	2.9 km	MPC · JPL
28823 Archibald	2000 JM_{26}	Archibald	May 7, 2000	Socorro	LINEAR	·	4.3 km	MPC · JPL
28824 Marlablair	2000 JY_{26}	Marlablair	May 7, 2000	Socorro	LINEAR	·	4.7 km	MPC · JPL
28825 Bryangoehring	2000 JG_{28}	Bryangoehring	May 7, 2000	Socorro	LINEAR	·	6.6 km	MPC · JPL
28826	2000 JQ_{28}	—	May 7, 2000	Socorro	LINEAR	PAD	7.6 km	MPC · JPL
28827	2000 JK_{29}	—	May 7, 2000	Socorro	LINEAR	·	5.8 km	MPC · JPL
28828 Aalamiharandi	2000 JT_{29}	Aalamiharandi	May 7, 2000	Socorro	LINEAR	·	5.5 km	MPC · JPL
28829 Abelsky	2000 JO_{30}	Abelsky	May 7, 2000	Socorro	LINEAR	·	2.7 km	MPC · JPL
28830	2000 JY_{30}	—	May 7, 2000	Socorro	LINEAR	·	6.4 km	MPC · JPL
28831 Abu-Alshaikh	2000 JL_{32}	Abu-Alshaikh	May 7, 2000	Socorro	LINEAR	·	3.4 km	MPC · JPL
28832 Akana	2000 JW_{32}	Akana	May 7, 2000	Socorro	LINEAR	·	3.7 km	MPC · JPL
28833 Arunachalam	2000 JB_{35}	Arunachalam	May 7, 2000	Socorro	LINEAR	KOR	3.1 km	MPC · JPL
28834	2000 JD_{37}	—	May 7, 2000	Socorro	LINEAR	KOR	4.9 km	MPC · JPL
28835	2000 JX_{37}	—	May 7, 2000	Socorro	LINEAR	·	9.6 km	MPC · JPL
28836 Ashmore	2000 JH_{38}	Ashmore	May 7, 2000	Socorro	LINEAR	·	3.0 km	MPC · JPL
28837 Nibalachandar	2000 JN_{38}	Nibalachandar	May 7, 2000	Socorro	LINEAR	·	6.1 km	MPC · JPL
28838	2000 JA_{41}	—	May 6, 2000	Socorro	LINEAR	MAR ·	4.0 km	MPC · JPL
28839	2000 JG_{41}	—	May 6, 2000	Socorro	LINEAR	·	5.3 km	MPC · JPL
28840	2000 JB_{44}	—	May 7, 2000	Socorro	LINEAR	·	4.6 km	MPC · JPL
28841 Kelseybarter	2000 JK_{45}	Kelseybarter	May 7, 2000	Socorro	LINEAR	·	3.1 km	MPC · JPL
28842 Bhowmik	2000 JO_{45}	Bhowmik	May 7, 2000	Socorro	LINEAR	KOR	3.6 km	MPC · JPL
28843	2000 JZ_{45}	—	May 7, 2000	Socorro	LINEAR	THM	7.6 km	MPC · JPL
28844	2000 JS_{47}	—	May 9, 2000	Socorro	LINEAR	·	4.2 km	MPC · JPL
28845	2000 JP_{49}	—	May 9, 2000	Socorro	LINEAR	·	5.7 km	MPC · JPL
28846	2000 JQ_{50}	—	May 9, 2000	Socorro	LINEAR	·	5.7 km	MPC · JPL
28847	2000 JT_{50}	—	May 9, 2000	Socorro	LINEAR	·	5.2 km	MPC · JPL
28848 Nicolemarie	2000 JH_{53}	Nicolemarie	May 9, 2000	Socorro	LINEAR	KOR	4.8 km	MPC · JPL
28849	2000 JC_{54}	—	May 6, 2000	Socorro	LINEAR	EUN	4.4 km	MPC · JPL
28850	2000 JS_{54}	—	May 6, 2000	Socorro	LINEAR	·	9.5 km	MPC · JPL
28851 Londonbolsius	2000 JE_{55}	Londonbolsius	May 6, 2000	Socorro	LINEAR	·	5.9 km	MPC · JPL
28852 Westonbraun	2000 JH_{55}	Westonbraun	May 6, 2000	Socorro	LINEAR	·	4.4 km	MPC · JPL
28853 Bukhamsin	2000 JX_{55}	Bukhamsin	May 6, 2000	Socorro	LINEAR	KOR	4.1 km	MPC · JPL
28854 Budisteanu	2000 JP_{56}	Budisteanu	May 6, 2000	Socorro	LINEAR	·	3.0 km	MPC · JPL
28855 Burchell	2000 JN_{57}	Burchell	May 6, 2000	Socorro	LINEAR	·	3.4 km	MPC · JPL
28856	2000 JZ_{58}	—	May 6, 2000	Socorro	LINEAR	·	5.2 km	MPC · JPL
28857	2000 JE_{59}	—	May 7, 2000	Socorro	LINEAR	slow	8.3 km	MPC · JPL
28858	2000 JK_{59}	—	May 7, 2000	Socorro	LINEAR	·	4.5 km	MPC · JPL
28859	2000 JC_{60}	—	May 7, 2000	Socorro	LINEAR	ADE	9.3 km	MPC · JPL
28860 Cappelletto	2000 JQ_{60}	Cappelletto	May 7, 2000	Socorro	LINEAR	·	3.0 km	MPC · JPL
28861	2000 JF_{62}	—	May 7, 2000	Socorro	LINEAR	·	20 km	MPC · JPL
28862	2000 JF_{65}	—	May 5, 2000	Socorro	LINEAR	·	7.4 km	MPC · JPL
28863	2000 JW_{65}	—	May 6, 2000	Socorro	LINEAR	·	9.6 km	MPC · JPL
28864 Franciscocordova	2000 JG_{70}	Franciscocordova	May 1, 2000	Anderson Mesa	LONEOS	MAR	5.3 km	MPC · JPL
28865	2000 JX_{74}	—	May 4, 2000	Kitt Peak	Spacewatch	V	2.6 km	MPC · JPL
28866 Chakraborty	2000 JX_{75}	Chakraborty	May 6, 2000	Socorro	LINEAR	·	3.3 km	MPC · JPL
28867	2000 JU_{76}	—	May 7, 2000	Socorro	LINEAR	·	3.2 km	MPC · JPL
28868 Rianchandra	2000 JN_{77}	Rianchandra	May 7, 2000	Socorro	LINEAR	·	7.6 km	MPC · JPL
28869 Chaubal	2000 JA_{84}	Chaubal	May 5, 2000	Socorro	LINEAR	·	3.0 km	MPC · JPL
28870	2000 JO_{85}	—	May 2, 2000	Socorro	LINEAR	WAT	5.7 km	MPC · JPL
28871	2000 KA_{6}	—	May 27, 2000	Socorro	LINEAR	KOR	5.1 km	MPC · JPL
28872	2000 KF_{6}	—	May 27, 2000	Socorro	LINEAR	slow	7.3 km	MPC · JPL
28873	2000 KM_{7}	—	May 27, 2000	Socorro	LINEAR	·	9.2 km	MPC · JPL
28874 Michaelchen	2000 KC_{15}	Michaelchen	May 28, 2000	Socorro	LINEAR	NYS	3.0 km	MPC · JPL
28875	2000 KH_{18}	—	May 28, 2000	Socorro	LINEAR	HYG	12 km	MPC · JPL
28876	2000 KL_{31}	—	May 28, 2000	Socorro	LINEAR	slow	16 km	MPC · JPL
28877	2000 KC_{41}	—	May 28, 2000	Socorro	LINEAR	·	5.4 km	MPC · JPL
28878 Segner	2000 KL_{41}	Segner	May 26, 2000	Ondřejov	P. Kušnirák	·	4.0 km	MPC · JPL
28879	2000 KK_{42}	—	May 28, 2000	Socorro	LINEAR	·	10 km	MPC · JPL
28880	2000 KN_{46}	—	May 27, 2000	Socorro	LINEAR	EOS	7.3 km	MPC · JPL
28881	2000 KG_{48}	—	May 27, 2000	Socorro	LINEAR	·	8.1 km	MPC · JPL
28882	2000 KO_{48}	—	May 27, 2000	Socorro	LINEAR	·	12 km	MPC · JPL
28883 Kouveliotou	2000 KS_{52}	Kouveliotou	May 24, 2000	Anderson Mesa	LONEOS	·	4.4 km	MPC · JPL
28884 Youngjunchoi	2000 KA_{54}	Youngjunchoi	May 27, 2000	Anderson Mesa	LONEOS	·	11 km	MPC · JPL
28885	2000 KH_{56}	—	May 27, 2000	Socorro	LINEAR	GEF	6.4 km	MPC · JPL
28886 Ericajawin	2000 KX_{57}	Ericajawin	May 24, 2000	Anderson Mesa	LONEOS	MAR	3.5 km	MPC · JPL
28887 Sabina	2000 KQ_{58}	Sabina	May 24, 2000	Anderson Mesa	LONEOS	·	4.4 km	MPC · JPL
28888 Agrusa	2000 KS_{60}	Agrusa	May 25, 2000	Anderson Mesa	LONEOS	·	4.0 km	MPC · JPL
28889 Turrentine	2000 KQ_{63}	Turrentine	May 26, 2000	Anderson Mesa	LONEOS	EOS	6.1 km	MPC · JPL
28890 Gabaldon	2000 KY_{65}	Gabaldon	May 27, 2000	Anderson Mesa	LONEOS	·	2.9 km	MPC · JPL
28891	2000 KK_{75}	—	May 27, 2000	Socorro	LINEAR	·	3.6 km	MPC · JPL
28892	2000 LZ_{2}	—	June 4, 2000	Socorro	LINEAR	PHO	4.8 km	MPC · JPL
28893	2000 LL_{7}	—	June 6, 2000	Kitt Peak	Spacewatch	·	3.3 km	MPC · JPL
28894 Ryanchung	2000 LT_{8}	Ryanchung	June 5, 2000	Socorro	LINEAR	SUL	8.4 km	MPC · JPL
28895	2000 LS_{9}	—	June 6, 2000	Socorro	LINEAR	THM	11 km	MPC · JPL
28896	2000 LN_{10}	—	June 1, 2000	Socorro	LINEAR	·	5.6 km	MPC · JPL
28897	2000 LP_{10}	—	June 1, 2000	Socorro	LINEAR	EUN	6.3 km	MPC · JPL
28898	2000 LX_{10}	—	June 4, 2000	Socorro	LINEAR	MAR	4.4 km	MPC · JPL
28899	2000 LV_{11}	—	June 4, 2000	Socorro	LINEAR	·	10 km	MPC · JPL
28900	2000 LH_{12}	—	June 4, 2000	Socorro	LINEAR	EUN	5.6 km	MPC · JPL

== 28901–29000 ==
back to top

Designation			Discovery			Properties		Ref
Permanent	Provisional	Named after	Date	Site	Discoverer(s)	Category	Diam.	Ref
28901	2000 LJ_{14}	—	June 6, 2000	Socorro	LINEAR	·	6.2 km	MPC · JPL
28902	2000 LZ_{33}	—	June 4, 2000	Haleakala	NEAT	V	2.6 km	MPC · JPL
28903	2000 LD_{35}	—	June 1, 2000	Haleakala	NEAT	·	5.1 km	MPC · JPL
28904	2000 ML	—	June 20, 2000	Haleakala	NEAT	URS	16 km	MPC · JPL
28905	2000 MQ	—	June 24, 2000	Haleakala	NEAT	GEF	4.7 km	MPC · JPL
28906	2000 MP_{2}	—	June 24, 2000	Haleakala	NEAT	·	6.2 km	MPC · JPL
28907	2000 MH_{3}	—	June 25, 2000	Kitt Peak	Spacewatch	·	2.6 km	MPC · JPL
28908	2000 NY_{6}	—	July 4, 2000	Kitt Peak	Spacewatch	VER	11 km	MPC · JPL
28909	2000 NC_{10}	—	July 7, 2000	Socorro	LINEAR	·	8.1 km	MPC · JPL
28910	2000 NH_{11}	—	July 10, 2000	Valinhos	P. R. Holvorcem	·	4.7 km	MPC · JPL
28911 Mishacollins	2000 NB_{16}	Mishacollins	July 5, 2000	Anderson Mesa	LONEOS	GEF	5.6 km	MPC · JPL
28912 Sonahosseini	2000 NL_{26}	Sonahosseini	July 4, 2000	Anderson Mesa	LONEOS	SYL · CYB	10 km	MPC · JPL
28913	2000 OT	—	July 23, 2000	Reedy Creek	J. Broughton	·	6.5 km	MPC · JPL
28914	2000 OC_{12}	—	July 23, 2000	Socorro	LINEAR	EOS · slow	7.4 km	MPC · JPL
28915	2000 OU_{13}	—	July 23, 2000	Socorro	LINEAR	THM	7.7 km	MPC · JPL
28916 Logancollins	2000 OL_{35}	Logancollins	July 31, 2000	Socorro	LINEAR	·	1.7 km	MPC · JPL
28917 Zacollins	2000 QR_{17}	Zacollins	August 24, 2000	Socorro	LINEAR	·	6.4 km	MPC · JPL
28918	2000 QF_{21}	—	August 24, 2000	Socorro	LINEAR	3:2	18 km	MPC · JPL
28919	2000 QP_{27}	—	August 24, 2000	Socorro	LINEAR	NYS	2.9 km	MPC · JPL
28920	2000 QC_{91}	—	August 25, 2000	Socorro	LINEAR	·	5.0 km	MPC · JPL
28921	2000 QZ_{122}	—	August 25, 2000	Socorro	LINEAR	·	4.9 km	MPC · JPL
28922	2000 QK_{132}	—	August 26, 2000	Socorro	LINEAR	·	19 km	MPC · JPL
28923	2000 QJ_{161}	—	August 31, 2000	Socorro	LINEAR	EOS	6.2 km	MPC · JPL
28924 Jennanncsele	2000 QD_{205}	Jennanncsele	August 31, 2000	Socorro	LINEAR	·	2.7 km	MPC · JPL
28925	2000 QY_{205}	—	August 31, 2000	Socorro	LINEAR	·	9.7 km	MPC · JPL
28926 Adamnimoy	2000 QE_{231}	Adamnimoy	August 20, 2000	Anderson Mesa	LONEOS	EOS	7.6 km	MPC · JPL
28927	2000 RA_{6}	—	September 1, 2000	Socorro	LINEAR	·	3.3 km	MPC · JPL
28928	2000 RY_{12}	—	September 1, 2000	Socorro	LINEAR	(1118) · slow	11 km	MPC · JPL
28929	2000 RU_{13}	—	September 1, 2000	Socorro	LINEAR	·	11 km	MPC · JPL
28930	2000 RA_{31}	—	September 1, 2000	Socorro	LINEAR	·	5.4 km	MPC · JPL
28931	2000 RU_{54}	—	September 3, 2000	Socorro	LINEAR	EOS	7.9 km	MPC · JPL
28932 Izidoro	2000 RY_{102}	Izidoro	September 5, 2000	Anderson Mesa	LONEOS	·	14 km	MPC · JPL
28933	2000 SZ_{22}	—	September 25, 2000	Višnjan Observatory	K. Korlević	·	10 km	MPC · JPL
28934 Meagancurrie	2000 SB_{113}	Meagancurrie	September 24, 2000	Socorro	LINEAR	·	5.6 km	MPC · JPL
28935 Kevincyr	2000 SH_{123}	Kevincyr	September 24, 2000	Socorro	LINEAR	·	3.1 km	MPC · JPL
28936 Dalapati	2000 SF_{139}	Dalapati	September 23, 2000	Socorro	LINEAR	·	8.9 km	MPC · JPL
28937	2000 SM_{162}	—	September 21, 2000	Haleakala	NEAT	EOS	5.8 km	MPC · JPL
28938	2000 SR_{311}	—	September 27, 2000	Socorro	LINEAR	·	18 km	MPC · JPL
28939	2000 TO_{33}	—	October 4, 2000	Socorro	LINEAR	HNS	3.9 km	MPC · JPL
28940	2000 UD_{1}	—	October 22, 2000	Višnjan Observatory	K. Korlević	·	7.3 km	MPC · JPL
28941	2000 UH_{8}	—	October 24, 2000	Socorro	LINEAR	·	4.6 km	MPC · JPL
28942 Yennydieguez	2000 UJ_{14}	Yennydieguez	October 24, 2000	Socorro	LINEAR	·	7.5 km	MPC · JPL
28943	2000 UF_{51}	—	October 24, 2000	Socorro	LINEAR	AGN	3.8 km	MPC · JPL
28944	2000 UA_{70}	—	October 25, 2000	Socorro	LINEAR	·	3.6 km	MPC · JPL
28945 Taideding	2000 UA_{79}	Taideding	October 24, 2000	Socorro	LINEAR	·	3.7 km	MPC · JPL
28946	2000 VW_{56}	—	November 3, 2000	Socorro	LINEAR	·	2.4 km	MPC · JPL
28947	2000 WH_{12}	—	November 22, 2000	Haleakala	NEAT	MAR	4.6 km	MPC · JPL
28948 Disalvo	2000 WJ_{34}	Disalvo	November 20, 2000	Socorro	LINEAR	fast	3.6 km	MPC · JPL
28949	2000 WV_{100}	—	November 21, 2000	Socorro	LINEAR	URS	15 km	MPC · JPL
28950 Ailisdooner	2000 WF_{133}	Ailisdooner	November 19, 2000	Socorro	LINEAR	EOS	4.2 km	MPC · JPL
28951	2000 WA_{149}	—	November 29, 2000	Haleakala	NEAT	BRA	8.8 km	MPC · JPL
28952 Ericepstein	2000 YG_{35}	Ericepstein	December 30, 2000	Socorro	LINEAR	NYS	4.1 km	MPC · JPL
28953 Hollyerickson	2000 YL_{37}	Hollyerickson	December 30, 2000	Socorro	LINEAR	·	3.6 km	MPC · JPL
28954 Feiyiou	2000 YA_{41}	Feiyiou	December 30, 2000	Socorro	LINEAR	·	7.4 km	MPC · JPL
28955 Kaliadeborah	2000 YZ_{58}	Kaliadeborah	December 30, 2000	Socorro	LINEAR	·	3.9 km	MPC · JPL
28956	2001 AA_{45}	—	January 15, 2001	Oizumi	T. Kobayashi	·	8.9 km	MPC · JPL
28957 Danielfulop	2001 BE_{50}	Danielfulop	January 21, 2001	Socorro	LINEAR	·	2.9 km	MPC · JPL
28958 Binns	2001 CQ_{42}	Binns	February 13, 2001	Socorro	LINEAR	L4 · ERY	22 km	MPC · JPL
28959	2001 DL_{74}	—	February 19, 2001	Socorro	LINEAR	EUP	18 km	MPC · JPL
28960	2001 DZ_{81}	—	February 22, 2001	Kitt Peak	Spacewatch	L4	17 km	MPC · JPL
28961	2001 FO_{64}	—	March 19, 2001	Socorro	LINEAR	·	2.7 km	MPC · JPL
28962	2001 FL_{117}	—	March 19, 2001	Socorro	LINEAR	·	17 km	MPC · JPL
28963 Tamyiu	2001 FY_{121}	Tamyiu	March 29, 2001	Desert Beaver	W. K. Y. Yeung	NYS	3.4 km	MPC · JPL
28964 Ashokverma	2001 FG_{122}	Ashokverma	March 23, 2001	Anderson Mesa	LONEOS	·	9.6 km	MPC · JPL
28965	2001 FF_{162}	—	March 30, 2001	Haleakala	NEAT	KOR	3.3 km	MPC · JPL
28966 Yuyingshih	2001 HS_{24}	Yuyingshih	April 26, 2001	Desert Beaver	W. K. Y. Yeung	slow	13 km	MPC · JPL
28967 Gerhardter	2001 HK_{34}	Gerhardter	April 27, 2001	Socorro	LINEAR	·	2.6 km	MPC · JPL
28968 Gongmiaoxin	2001 HT_{36}	Gongmiaoxin	April 29, 2001	Socorro	LINEAR	·	3.2 km	MPC · JPL
28969 Youngminjeongahn	2001 HM_{57}	Youngminjeongahn	April 25, 2001	Anderson Mesa	LONEOS	·	7.8 km	MPC · JPL
28970	2001 JJ_{4}	—	May 15, 2001	Haleakala	NEAT	EOS	6.9 km	MPC · JPL
28971	2001 KM_{28}	—	May 18, 2001	Socorro	LINEAR	·	4.8 km	MPC · JPL
28972	2001 KV_{38}	—	May 22, 2001	Socorro	LINEAR	EUN	3.5 km	MPC · JPL
28973	2001 KN_{42}	—	May 21, 2001	Socorro	LINEAR	EUN	4.9 km	MPC · JPL
28974	2001 KW_{59}	—	May 26, 2001	Socorro	LINEAR	·	4.5 km	MPC · JPL
28975 Galinborisov	2001 KR_{69}	Galinborisov	May 22, 2001	Anderson Mesa	LONEOS	·	2.8 km	MPC · JPL
28976 Sevigny	2001 KN_{73}	Sevigny	May 24, 2001	Anderson Mesa	LONEOS	·	3.8 km	MPC · JPL
28977	2001 KP_{73}	—	May 24, 2001	Socorro	LINEAR	ADE	9.4 km	MPC · JPL
28978 Ixion	2001 KX_{76}	Ixion	May 22, 2001	Cerro Tololo	Deep Ecliptic Survey	plutino	697 km	MPC · JPL
28979	2001 LW	—	June 13, 2001	Socorro	LINEAR	·	13 km	MPC · JPL
28980 Chowyunfat	2001 LS_{1}	Chowyunfat	June 15, 2001	Desert Beaver	W. K. Y. Yeung	·	2.9 km	MPC · JPL
28981	2001 LY_{3}	—	June 13, 2001	Socorro	LINEAR	·	6.2 km	MPC · JPL
28982	2001 LJ_{17}	—	June 15, 2001	Socorro	LINEAR	·	3.1 km	MPC · JPL
28983 Omergranek	2001 LK_{19}	Omergranek	June 15, 2001	Socorro	LINEAR	·	2.1 km	MPC · JPL
28984	2001 MS_{2}	—	June 16, 2001	Palomar	NEAT	EOS	5.3 km	MPC · JPL
28985	2001 MP_{5}	—	June 17, 2001	Palomar	NEAT	·	2.7 km	MPC · JPL
28986	2001 MG_{13}	—	June 23, 2001	Palomar	NEAT	V	2.1 km	MPC · JPL
28987 Assafin	2001 MP_{14}	Assafin	June 28, 2001	Anderson Mesa	LONEOS	·	1.6 km	MPC · JPL
28988	2001 MS_{23}	—	June 27, 2001	Haleakala	NEAT	·	1.3 km	MPC · JPL
28989 Lenaadams	2001 MZ_{24}	Lenaadams	June 16, 2001	Anderson Mesa	LONEOS	·	7.5 km	MPC · JPL
28990 Ariheinze	2001 ML_{27}	Ariheinze	June 20, 2001	Anderson Mesa	LONEOS	URS	12 km	MPC · JPL
28991	2001 MU_{27}	—	June 21, 2001	Socorro	LINEAR	EOS	10 km	MPC · JPL
28992 Timbrothers	2001 MW_{28}	Timbrothers	June 27, 2001	Anderson Mesa	LONEOS	MAS	1.7 km	MPC · JPL
28993	2001 NA_{6}	—	July 13, 2001	Haleakala	NEAT	NYS	2.6 km	MPC · JPL
28994 Helenabates	2001 OO_{8}	Helenabates	July 17, 2001	Anderson Mesa	LONEOS	·	5.7 km	MPC · JPL
28995 Marquess	2001 OF_{46}	Marquess	July 16, 2001	Anderson Mesa	LONEOS	·	3.6 km	MPC · JPL
28996	2001 OL_{51}	—	July 21, 2001	Palomar	NEAT	·	5.2 km	MPC · JPL
28997	2020 P-L	—	September 24, 1960	Palomar	C. J. van Houten, I. van Houten-Groeneveld, T. Gehrels	(5)	3.7 km	MPC · JPL
28998	2184 P-L	—	September 24, 1960	Palomar	C. J. van Houten, I. van Houten-Groeneveld, T. Gehrels	·	4.4 km	MPC · JPL
28999	2505 P-L	—	September 24, 1960	Palomar	C. J. van Houten, I. van Houten-Groeneveld, T. Gehrels	·	2.4 km	MPC · JPL
29000	2607 P-L	—	September 24, 1960	Palomar	C. J. van Houten, I. van Houten-Groeneveld, T. Gehrels	·	4.5 km	MPC · JPL

back to top

== See also ==
- Meanings of minor-planet names: 28001–29000
