= 28439 Miguelreyes =

Main-belt asteroid

Discovery
- Discovered by: LINEAR
- Discovery site: Lincoln Lab's ETS
- Discovery date: 3 January 2000

Designations
- Named after: Miguel Reyes (2011 ISEF awardee)
- Alternative designations: 2000 AM_{30} · 1998 UH_{41}
- Minor planet category: main-belt · (middle) background

Orbital characteristics
- Epoch 4 September 2017 (JD 2458000.5)
- Uncertainty parameter 0
- Observation arc: 20.64 yr (7,537 days)
- Aphelion: 3.0242 AU
- Perihelion: 2.5050 AU
- Semi-major axis: 2.7646 AU
- Eccentricity: 0.0939
- Orbital period (sidereal): 4.60 yr (1,679 days)
- Mean anomaly: 222.06°
- Mean motion: 0° 12^{m} 51.84^{s} / day
- Inclination: 4.3355°
- Longitude of ascending node: 87.853°
- Argument of perihelion: 118.95°

Physical characteristics
- Mean diameter: 3.851±0.145 km
- Geometric albedo: 0.249±0.071
- Absolute magnitude (H): 14.4

28439 Miguelreyes (provisional designation 2000 AM_{30}) is a background asteroid from the central region of the asteroid belt, approximately 3.9 kilometers in diameter. The asteroid was discovered on 3 January 2000, by the LINEAR team at Lincoln Lab's ETS in Socorro, New Mexico, United States. It was named for Filipino student Miguel Reyes, a 2011 ISEF awardee.

== Orbit and classification ==
Miguelreyes is a non-family from the main belt's background population. It orbits the Sun in the central asteroid belt at a distance of 2.5–3.0 AU once every 4 years and 7 months (1,679 days). Its orbit has an eccentricity of 0.09 and an inclination of 4° with respect to the ecliptic.

The asteroid's observation arc begins almost 4 years prior to its official discovery observation, with a precovery taken by the Steward Observatory's Spacewatch survey at Kitt Peakt in April 1996.

== Physical characteristics ==
According to the survey carried out by the NEOWISE mission of NASA's Wide-field Infrared Survey Explorer, Miguelreyes measures 3.851 kilometers in diameter and its surface has an albedo of 0.249.

=== Lightcurves ===
As of 2018, Miguelreyes's spectral type, as well as its rotation period and shape remain unknown.

== Naming ==
This minor planet was named in honor of Miguel Arnold Silverio Reyes, a Philippine high-school student from Manila, who was awarded second place in the 2011 Intel International Science and Engineering Fair for his materials and bioengineering project entitled "Synthesis and Characterization of Composite Plastics from Thermoplastic Starch and Nano-sized Calcium Phosphate for Film Packaging". His project sought alternatives, such as cornstarch, in making biodegradable plastic for film packaging. He attended the Philippine Science High School in Quezon City, Philippines.
