= Meanings of minor-planet names: 28001–29000 =

As minor planet discoveries are confirmed, they are given a permanent number by the IAU's Minor Planet Center (MPC), and the discoverers can then submit names for them, following the IAU's naming conventions. The list below concerns those minor planets in the specified number-range that have received names, and explains the meanings of those names.

Official naming citations of newly named small Solar System bodies are approved and published in a bulletin by IAU's Working Group for Small Bodies Nomenclature (WGSBN). Before May 2021, citations were published in MPC's Minor Planet Circulars for many decades. Recent citations can also be found on the JPL Small-Body Database (SBDB). Until his death in 2016, German astronomer Lutz D. Schmadel compiled these citations into the Dictionary of Minor Planet Names (DMP) and regularly updated the collection.

Based on Paul Herget's The Names of the Minor Planets, Schmadel also researched the unclear origin of numerous asteroids, most of which had been named prior to World War II. This article incorporates text from this source, which is in the public domain: SBDB New namings may only be added to this list below after official publication as the preannouncement of names is condemned. The WGSBN publishes a comprehensive guideline for the naming rules of non-cometary small Solar System bodies.

== 28001–28100 ==
Named minor planet	Provisional	This minor planet was named for...	Ref · Catalog
28004 Terakawa	1997 XA	Syoji Terakawa, expert mirror polisher.	JPL · 28004
28007 Galhassin	1997 XO_{10}	GAL Hassin is an International Center for Astronomy in Isnello (Sicily, Italy) undertaking science education and outreach activities, along with advanced astronomical research. The latter will be implemented with the upcoming 1-meter Wide-field Mufara Telescope (WMT). This facility will be mostly devoted to NEO observations.	JPL · 28007
28019 Warchal	1998 AW_{8}	Bohdan Warchal (1930–2000), Slovak violinist, conductor and educator, member of the Slovak Philharmonic Orchestra and chief conductor and soloist of the Slovak Chamber Orchestra	MPC · 28019
28037 Williammonts	1998 FS_{33}	William Lowell Monts (born 1997) is a finalist in the 2012 Broadcom MASTERS, a math and science competition for middle-school students, for his physical sciences project.	JPL · 28037
28038 Nicoleodzer	1998 FK_{35}	Nicole Brooke Odzer (born 1998) is a finalist in the 2012 Broadcom MASTERS, a math and science competition for middle-school students, for her environmental sciences project.	JPL · 28038
28039 Mauraoei	1998 FV_{78}	Maura Clare Oei (born 1998) is a finalist in the 2012 Broadcom MASTERS, a math and science competition for middle-school students, for her engineering project.	JPL · 28039
28042 Mayapatel	1998 FB_{90}	Maya Mona Patel (born 1998) is a finalist in the 2012 Broadcom MASTERS, a math and science competition for middle-school students, for her earth and space sciences project.	JPL · 28042
28043 Mabelwheeler	1998 FX_{90}	Mabel Elizabeth Wheeler (born 2000) is a finalist in the 2012 Broadcom MASTERS, a math and science competition for middle-school students, for her physical sciences project. She attends the Cherry Hill Elementary School, Orem, Utah	JPL · 28043
28045 Johnwilkins	1998 FB_{118}	John C. Wilkins (born 2000) is a finalist in the 2012 Broadcom MASTERS, a math and science competition for middle-school students, for his earth and space sciences project.	JPL · 28045
28048 Camilleyoke	1998 HH_{91}	Camille Virginia Yoke (born 1998) is a finalist in the 2012 Broadcom MASTERS, a math and science competition for middle-school students, for her physical sciences project.	JPL · 28048
28049 Yvonnealex	1998 HM_{94}	Yvonne Alexander mentored a finalist in the 2012 Broadcom MASTERS, a math and science competition for middle-school students.	JPL · 28049
28050 Asekomeh	1998 HC_{99}	Demetrius Asekomeh mentored a finalist in the 2012 Broadcom MASTERS, a math and science competition for middle-school students.	JPL · 28050
28051 Bruzzone	1998 HS_{153}	Juan Sebastian Bruzzone (born 1981) is a Uruguayan Postdoctoral Researcher at the NASA Goddard Space Flight Center. He specializes in the study of meteors, meteoroids, debris disks and planetary systems, including developments in processing of radar, polarimetric and optical observations of meteors.	IAU · 28051
28052 Lowellputnam	1998 KP_{1}	W. Lowell Putnam IV (b. 1954), the 5th Sole Trustee of Lowell Observatory.	IAU · 28052
28053 Kimberlyputnam	1998 KE_{4}	Kimberly Putnam (b. 1969), the wife and partner of W. Lowell Putnam IV, Sole Trustee of Lowell Observatory.	IAU · 28053
28057 Hollars	1998 MM_{37}	Dennis R. Hollars (b. 1942), a long-time supporter of Lowell Observatory and its mission	IAU · 28057
28059 Kiliaan	1998 OZ_{7}	Cornelis Kiliaan, 16th-century Flemish linguist	JPL · 28059
28068 Stephbillings	1998 QO_{21}	Stephanie Billings mentored a finalist in the 2012 Broadcom MASTERS, a math and science competition for middle-school students.	JPL · 28068
28072 Lindbowerman	1998 QT_{31}	Lindsay Bowerman mentored a finalist in the 2012 Broadcom MASTERS, a math and science competition for middle-school students.	JPL · 28072
28073 Fohner	1998 QT_{40}	Nancy Fohner mentored a finalist in the 2012 Broadcom MASTERS, a math and science competition for middle-school students.	JPL · 28073
28074 Matgallagher	1998 QM_{41}	Matthew Gallagher mentored a finalist in the 2012 Broadcom MASTERS, a math and science competition for middle-school students.	JPL · 28074
28075 Emilyhoffman	1998 QU_{44}	Emily Hoffman mentored a finalist in the 2012 Broadcom MASTERS, a math and science competition for middle-school students.	JPL · 28075
28077 Hard	1998 QH_{55}	Michael W. Hard (born 1937) is a long-time friend of Lowell Observatory who has championed the Observatory in many ways. He had a 39-year senior executive career in banking in Arizona and served as a trustee on two foundation boards of directors. Michael was also very active in the community after retirement.	JPL · 28077
28078 Mauricehilleman	1998 QM_{55}	Maurice Hilleman, American microbiologist who developed 8 of the 14 most common vaccines in use today.	JPL · 28078
28081 Carriehudson	1998 QN_{80}	Carrie Hudson mentored a finalist in the 2012 Broadcom MASTERS, a math and science competition for middle-school students.	JPL · 28081
28091 Mikekane	1998 RQ_{49}	Michael Kane mentored a finalist in the 2012 Broadcom MASTERS, a math and science competition for middle-school students.	JPL · 28091
28092 Joannekear	1998 RT_{53}	Joanne Kear mentored a finalist in the 2012 Broadcom MASTERS, a math and science competition for middle-school students.	JPL · 28092
28093 Staceylevoit	1998 RG_{54}	Stacey Levoit mentored a finalist in the 2012 Broadcom MASTERS, a math and science competition for middle-school students.	JPL · 28093
28094 Michellewis	1998 RE_{56}	Michelle Lewis mentored a finalist in the 2012 Broadcom MASTERS, a math and science competition for middle-school students.	JPL · 28094
28095 Seanmahoney	1998 RA_{57}	Sean Mahoney mentored a finalist in the 2012 Broadcom MASTERS, a math and science competition for middle-school students.	JPL · 28095
28096 Kathrynmarsh	1998 RS_{59}	Kathryn Marsh mentored a finalist in the 2012 Broadcom MASTERS, a math and science competition for middle-school students.	JPL · 28096

== 28101–28200 ==
back to top

Named minor planet	Provisional	This minor planet was named for...	Ref · Catalog
28103 Benmcpheron	1998 RK_{80}	Ben McPheron mentored a finalist in the 2012 Broadcom MASTERS, a math and science competition for middle-school students.	JPL · 28103
28105 Santallo	1998 SC_{4}	Roland Santallo (born 1943), an amateur astronomer observing from Tahiti.	JPL · 28105
28107 Sapar	1998 SA_{13}	Arved-Ervin Sapar (born 1933) carried out pioneering studies of cosmology in Tartu, Estonia. He took into account the photon and neutrino background in cosmological equations. His contribution to modelling of stellar atmospheres has found acknowledgement among the astronomical community	JPL · 28107
28108 Sydneybarnes	1998 SB_{24}	Sydney Barnes (born 1967), an assistant astronomer at Lowell Observatory, enjoys working at the interface between theory and observations, particularly on topics related to the global properties of stars, and their changes with stellar age	JPL · 28108
28116 Kunovac	1998 SP_{56}	Vedad Kunovac (b. 1992), a Bosnian-born exoplanet astronomer.	IAU · 28116
28117 Mort	1998 SK_{57}	Greg Mort (born 1952) is a long-time supporter of Lowell Observatory's mission. Greg is an accomplished artist whose artwork has been displayed in the National Air and Space Museum, Corcoran Gallery of Art, and the White House.	IAU · 28117
28118 Vaux	1998 SR_{57}	Henry Vaux (b. 1940), former Associate Vice President at the University of California System.	IAU · 28118
28125 Juliomiguez	1998 SR_{107}	Julio Miguez mentored a finalist in the 2012 Broadcom MASTERS, a math and science competition for middle-school students.	JPL · 28125
28126 Nydegger	1998 SF_{109}	Jason Nydegger mentored a finalist in the 2012 Broadcom MASTERS, a math and science competition for middle-school students.	JPL · 28126
28127 Ogden-Stenerson	1998 SL_{110}	Carolyn Ogden-Stenerson mentored a finalist in the 2012 Broadcom MASTERS, a math and science competition for middle-school students.	JPL · 28127
28128 Cynthrossman	1998 ST_{118}	Cynthia Rossman mentored a finalist in the 2012 Broadcom MASTERS, a math and science competition for middle-school students	JPL · 28128
28129 Teresummers	1998 SF_{121}	Teresa Summers mentored a finalist in the 2012 Broadcom MASTERS, a math and science competition for middle-school students	JPL · 28129
28130 Troemper	1998 SK_{124}	Brett Troemper mentored a finalist in the 2012 Broadcom MASTERS, a math and science competition for middle-school students.	JPL · 28130
28131 Dougwelch	1998 SX_{127}	Doug Welch mentored a finalist in the 2012 Broadcom MASTERS, a math and science competition for middle-school students.	JPL · 28131
28132 Karenzobel	1998 SY_{128}	Karen Zobel mentored a finalist in the 2012 Broadcom MASTERS, a math and science competition for middle-school students.	JPL · 28132
28133 Kylebardwell	1998 SS_{130}	Kyle Thomas Bardwell (born 1993) was awarded first place in the 2011 Intel International Science and Engineering Fair for his animal sciences project.	JPL · 28133
28136 Chasegross	1998 SB_{134}	Chase Carter Gross (born 1995) was awarded second place in the 2011 Intel International Science and Engineering Fair for his animal sciences project.	JPL · 28136
28137 Helenyao	1998 SY_{138}	Helen Yao (born 1993) was awarded second place in the 2011 Intel International Science and Engineering Fair for her animal sciences project.	JPL · 28137
28141 ten Brummelaar	1998 TC	Theo ten Brummelaar (born 1962) is an Australian-American astronomer at the Georgia State University. He is the Director of the CHARA Array and a leader in the development of the use of optical interferometry throughout the astronomical community.	IAU · 28141
28146 Nackard	1998 TC_{32}	Palmer Nackard (b. 1988) and his family donate their time and talent to Lowell Observatory and other entities in the Flagstaff area. Palmer is a member of Lowell Observatory's Advisory Board and Executive Committee.	IAU · 28146
28147 Colbath	1998 TD_{32}	G. Kent Colbath (b. 1953) and his late wife Jill have been longtime supporters of Lowell Observatory for the past twenty years.	IAU · 28147
28148 Fuentes	1998 TL_{34}	Angel Fuentes (born 1983) is Dean of Academic and Student Affairs for the Math and Sciences Division at Laney College in California. Angel supports Lowell Observatory's mission, serves on Lowell Observatory's Advisory Board and is the Co-Chair of Lowell's Education and Outreach Committee.	IAU · 28148
28149 Arieldaniel	1998 TX_{34}	Ariel Daniel (b. 1998), a Senior Educator at Lowell Observatory.	IAU · 28149
28151 Markknopfler	1998 UG_{6}	Mark Knopfler (born 1949), a Scottish composer, guitarist and singer, who founded Dire Straits in 1977.	JPL · 28151
28155 Chengzhendai	1998 UB_{40}	Chengzhen Li Dai (born 1994) was awarded second place in the 2011 Intel International Science and Engineering Fair for his animal sciences project.	JPL · 28155
28156 McColl	1998 UF_{41}	Adrienne Brooke McColl (born 1993) was awarded best of category and first place in the 2011 Intel International Science and Engineering Fair for her animal sciences project.	JPL · 28156
28159 Giuricich	1998 VM_{7}	Alessio Pio Giuricich (born 1994) was awarded second place in the 2011 Intel International Science and Engineering Fair for his behavioral and social sciences project. He attends the Bishops Diocesan College, Cape Town, Western Cape, South Africa	JPL · 28159
28161 Neelpatel	1998 VB_{13}	Neel Sanjay Patel (born 1994) was awarded second place in the 2011 Intel International Science and Engineering Fair for his behavioral and social sciences project.	JPL · 28161
28163 Lorikim	1998 VP_{15}	Lori Kim (born 1993) was awarded second place in the 2011 Intel International Science and Engineering Fair for her behavioral and social sciences project.	JPL · 28163
28165 Bayanmashat	1998 VC_{25}	Bayan Mohammed Mashat (born 1995) was awarded first place in the 2011 Intel International Science and Engineering Fair for her behavioral and social sciences project.	JPL · 28165
28167 Andrewkim	1998 VQ_{25}	Andrew Wooyoung Kim (born 1993) was awarded best of category and first place in the 2011 Intel International Science and Engineering Fair for his behavioral and social sciences project.	JPL · 28167
28168 Evanolin	1998 VY_{25}	Evan Daniel Olin (born 1994) was awarded second place in the 2011 Intel International Science and Engineering Fair for his behavioral and social sciences team project.	JPL · 28168
28169 Cathconte	1998 VZ_{29}	Catherine Marie Conte (born 1995) was awarded second place in the 2011 Intel International Science and Engineering Fair for her behavioral and social sciences team project.	JPL · 28169
28171 Diannahu	1998 VV_{30}	Dianna Hu (born 1993) was awarded best of category and first place in the 2011 Intel International Science and Engineering Fair for her biochemistry project.	JPL · 28171
28173 Hisakichi	1998 VY_{32}	Hisakichi Sato (1902–1989), the discoverer's father	JPL · 28173
28174 Harue	1998 VC_{33}	Harue Sato (1909–2001), the discoverer's mother	JPL · 28174
28182 Chadharris	1998 WB_{10}	Chad Lawrence Harris (born 1992) was awarded second place in the 2011 Intel International Science and Engineering Fair for his biochemistry project.	JPL · 28182
28183 Naidu	1998 WM_{16}	Yamini T. Naidu (born 1995) was awarded first place in the 2011 Intel International Science and Engineering Fair for her biochemistry project.	JPL · 28183
28184 Vaishnavirao	1998 WP_{17}	Vaishnavi Lakshminarasimha Rao (born 1995) was awarded second place in the 2011 Intel International Science and Engineering Fair for her biochemistry project.	JPL · 28184
28193 Italosvevo	1998 WY_{30}	Italo Svevo was the pseudonym of Aron Hector Schmitz (1861–1928), an Italian writer and playwright. He is best known for the psychological novel La coscienza di Zeno.	IAU · 28193
28196 Szeged	1998 XY_{12}	Szeged, Hungary †	MPC · 28196

== 28201–28300 ==
back to top

Named minor planet	Provisional	This minor planet was named for...	Ref · Catalog
28201 Lifubin	1998 XV_{44}	Li Fubin (born 1993) was awarded second place in the 2011 Intel International Science and Engineering Fair for his biochemistry team project.	JPL · 28201
28204 Liyakang	1998 XX_{50}	Li Yakang (born 1992) was awarded second place in the 2011 Intel International Science and Engineering Fair for his biochemistry team project.	JPL · 28204
28206 Haozhongning	1998 XO_{52}	Hao Zhongning (born 1995) was awarded second place in the 2011 Intel International Science and Engineering Fair for his biochemistry team project.	JPL · 28206
28207 Blakesmith	1998 XH_{53}	Blake Edward Smith (born 1994) was awarded first place in the 2011 Intel International Science and Engineering Fair for his cellular and molecular biology project.	JPL · 28207
28208 Timtrippel	1998 XE_{54}	Timothy D. Trippel (born 1993) was awarded second place in the 2011 Intel International Science and Engineering Fair for his cellular and molecular biology project.	JPL · 28208
28209 Chatterjee	1998 XC_{63}	Ishan Chatterjee (born 1994) was awarded second place in the 2011 Intel International Science and Engineering Fair for his cellular and molecular biology project.	JPL · 28209
28210 Howardfeng	1998 XF_{63}	Howard Feng (born 1995) was awarded second place in the 2011 Intel International Science and Engineering Fair for his cellular and molecular biology project.	JPL · 28210
28220 York	1998 YN_{12}	York, UK †	MPC · 28220
28222 Neilpathak	1998 YF_{23}	Neil Pathak (born 1992) was awarded second place in the 2011 Intel International Science and Engineering Fair for his chemistry project.	JPL · 28222
28235 Kasparvonbraun	1999 AL_{8}	Kaspar von Braun (born 1971) is a German astronomer at the Lowell Observatory. His research interests in optical interferometry, stellar fundamental properties, and precision photometry guide his work in characterizing extrasolar planets.	IAU · 28235
28242 Mingantu	1999 AT_{22}	Ming Antu (1692–c. 1765), a Chinese astronomer and mathematician of the Qing Dynasty.	JPL · 28242
28245 Cruise	1999 AV_{37}	Sallie Cruise (born 1958) is a singer, musician and philanthropist from Hobart, Australia. Her stalwart support of the arts and literature have improved the communities around her.	IAU · 28245
28248 Barthélémy	1999 BQ_{4}	Pierre Barthélémy (born 1967), a French scientific journalist working mainly for Le Monde.	JPL · 28248
28251 Gerbaldi	1999 BW_{13}	Michele Gerbaldi (born 1944), a French astronomer specializing in stellar astrophysics.	JPL · 28251
28254 Raghrama	1999 BC_{21}	Raghavendra Ramachanderan (born 1994) was awarded best of category and first place in the 2011 Intel International Science and Engineering Fair for his chemistry project.	JPL · 28254
28272 Mikejanner	1999 CY_{17}	Michael Leonard Janner (born 1996) was awarded second place in the 2011 Intel International Science and Engineering Fair for his chemistry project.	JPL · 28272
28273 Maianhvu	1999 CD_{21}	Mai-Anh N. Vu (born 1995) was awarded first place in the 2011 Intel International Science and Engineering Fair for her chemistry team project.	JPL · 28273
28275 Quoc-Bao	1999 CM_{23}	Quoc-Bao Duy Nguyen (born 1994) was awarded first place in the 2011 Intel International Science and Engineering Fair for his chemistry team project.	JPL · 28275
28276 Filipnaiser	1999 CN_{25}	Filip Naiser (born 1992) was awarded second place in the 2011 Intel International Science and Engineering Fair for his computer science project.	JPL · 28276
28277 Chengherngyi	1999 CN_{27}	Cheng Yi Herng (born 1993) was awarded first place in the 2011 Intel International Science and Engineering Fair for his computer science project.	JPL · 28277
28287 Osmanov	1999 CT_{42}	Gadzhi Shamil'evich Osmanov (born 1994) was awarded second place in the 2011 Intel International Science and Engineering Fair for his computer science project.	JPL · 28287
28295 Heyizheng	1999 CE_{61}	Gadzhi Shamil'evich Osmanov (born 1994) was awarded second place in the 2011 Intel International Science and Engineering Fair for his computer science project.	JPL · 28295
28299 Kanghaoyan	1999 CH_{66}	Kang Haoyan (born 1993) was awarded second place in the 2011 Intel International Science and Engineering Fair for his computer science team project.	JPL · 28299

== 28301–28400 ==
back to top

Named minor planet	Provisional	This minor planet was named for...	Ref · Catalog
28305 Wangjiayi	1999 CH_{79}	Wang Jiayi (born 1993) was awarded second place in the 2011 Intel International Science and Engineering Fair for her computer science team project.	JPL · 28305
28309 Ericfein	1999 CB_{81}	Eric E. Fein (born 1993) was awarded second place in the 2011 Intel International Science and Engineering Fair for his earth and planetary science project.	JPL · 28309
28317 Aislinndeely	1999 CA_{106}	Aislinn Deely (born 1993) was awarded second place in the 2011 Intel International Science and Engineering Fair for her earth and planetary science project.	JPL · 28317
28318 Janecox	1999 CE_{106}	Jane M. Cox (born 1994) was awarded best of category and first place in the 2011 Intel International Science and Engineering Fair for her earth and planetary science project.	JPL · 28318
28321 Arnabdey	1999 CV_{110}	Arnab Dey (born 1994) was awarded second place in the 2011 Intel International Science and Engineering Fair for his electrical and mechanical engineering project.	JPL · 28321
28322 Kaeberich	1999 CK_{111}	Jan Kaeberich (born 1992) was awarded second place in the 2011 Intel International Science and Engineering Fair for his electrical and mechanical engineering project.	JPL · 28322
28324 Davidcampeau	1999 CN_{114}	David Alexandre Joseph Campeau (born 1995) was awarded second place in the 2011 Intel International Science and Engineering Fair for his electrical and mechanical engineering project.	JPL · 28324
28331 Dianebérard	1999 CD_{156}	Diane Bérard (born 1990) is a research engineer at the Paris Observatory (Meudon, France). Her work includes observing stellar occultations to study small-body ring systems (Chariklo and Haumea) and astronomy outreach.	IAU · 28331
28340 Yukihiro	1999 EG_{5}	Yukihiro Adachi, Japanese member of the Matsue Astronomy Club and an observing partner of the discoverer	JPL · 28340
28341 Bingaman	1999 EU_{5}	Missouri-born Kory Bingaman (born 1984) is a talented artist and graphic novelist	JPL · 28341
28342 Haverhals	1999 FB_{9}	Peter Haverhals (born 1950) is a retired teacher, formerly of Watson Groen Christian School. He taught junior and senior high school students for almost two decades, inspiring students in math, literature, and the fundamentals of good judgment.	IAU · 28342
28343 Florcalandra	1999 FG_{9}	Maria Florencia Calandra (born 1990) is a member of the Planetary Science Group of the Universidad Nacional de San Juan (Argentina). She studies the formation and evolution of Oort clouds in the Solar and exoplanetary systems.	IAU · 28343
28344 Tallsalt	1999 FE_{19}	Verna Tallsalt (born 1963) is an elementary school teacher on the Navajo Nation. She participates in STEM educational programs with NAU, Diné College, and NASA. Verna serves on Lowell Observatory's Advisory Board and is active as an indigenous cultural advisor.	IAU · 28344
28345 Akivabarnun	1999 FL_{19}	Akiva Bar-Nun (1940–2017) studied the thermal evolution of comets, planetary atmospheres of Jupiter, Saturn and Titan, and chemical processes on Mars, the Moon, and other bodies. Bar-Nun was a contributor to the Rosetta mission as head of Israel's space agency.	IAU · 28345
28346 Kent	1999 FV_{19}	Kent Hodgson, teacher and author	JPL · 28346
28351 Andrewfeldman	1999 FP_{29}	Andrew Beekman Feldman (born 1994) was awarded second place in the 2011 Intel International Science and Engineering Fair for his electrical and mechanical engineering project.	JPL · 28351
28353 Chrisnielsen	1999 FH_{32}	Christopher Stephen Nielsen (born 1993) was awarded first place in the 2011 Intel International Science and Engineering Fair for his electrical and mechanical engineering project.	JPL · 28353
28364 Bruceelmegreen	1999 GN_{7}	Bruce Elmegreen (born 1950), is an American astronomer who experimented on devices and materials at IBM Research, the research and development division for IBM. His research included the interstellar medium, galaxy formation and evolution, and the formation of stars.	IAU · 28364
28366 Verkuil	1999 GA_{16}	Robert Huntington Verkuil (born 1994) was awarded second place in the 2011 Intel International Science and Engineering Fair for his electrical and mechanical engineering project.	JPL · 28366
28376 Atifjaved	1999 JX_{19}	Atif Javed (born 1992) was awarded second place in the 2011 Intel International Science and Engineering Fair for his electrical and mechanical engineering team project.	JPL · 28376
28382 Stevengillen	1999 JZ_{48}	Steven Donald Gillen (born 1993) was awarded second place in the 2011 Intel International Science and Engineering Fair for his electrical and mechanical engineering team project.	JPL · 28382
28390 Demjohopkins	1999 JW_{131}	Demitri Joseph Hopkins (born 1993) was awarded best of category and first place in the 2011 Intel International Science and Engineering Fair for his electrical and mechanical engineering team project. He attends the Merlo Station High School, Beaverton, Oregon, U.S.A	JPL · 28390
28394 Mittag-Leffler	1999 RY36	Magnus Gustav Mittag-Leffler (1848–1927), a professor in Helsinki and Stockholm.	JPL · 28394
28396 Eymann	1999 RY_{44}	Raymond Eymann, a French amateur astronomer.	JPL · 28396
28397 Forrestbetton	1999 RK_{53}	Forrest Evan Betton (born 1993) was awarded best of category and first place in the 2011 Intel International Science and Engineering Fair for his electrical and mechanical engineering team project.	JPL · 28397
28398 Ericthomas	1999 RE_{55}	Eric Michael Thomas (born 1992) was awarded best of category and first place in the 2011 Intel International Science and Engineering Fair for his electrical and mechanical engineering team project.	JPL · 28398
28400 Morgansinko	1999 RW_{160}	Morgan Walker Sinko (born 1994) was awarded second place in the 2011 Intel International Science and Engineering Fair for his environmental management project.	JPL · 28400

== 28401–28500 ==
back to top

Named minor planet	Provisional	This minor planet was named for...	Ref · Catalog
28402 Matthewkim	1999 RV_{211}	Matthew Jaebol Kim (born 1993) was awarded second place in the 2011 Intel International Science and Engineering Fair for his environmental management project.	JPL · 28402
28407 Meghanarao	1999 TH_{135}	Meghana Vijay Rao (born 1995) was awarded second place in the 2011 Intel International Science and Engineering Fair for her environmental management project.	JPL · 28407
28408 van Baalen	1999 TS_{222}	Mark van Baalen (b. 1945) has served on the Lowell Observatory Advisory Board since its founding in 1987. His career in geological sciences and astronomy at Harvard University spanned over five decades.	IAU · 28408
28411 Xiuqicao	1999 TQ_{284}	Xiuqi Cao (born 1994) was awarded first place in the 2011 Intel International Science and Engineering Fair for his environmental management team project.	JPL · 28411
28415 Yingxiong	1999 VE_{27}	Ying Xiong (born 1995) was awarded first place in the 2011 Intel International Science and Engineering Fair for his environmental management team project.	JPL · 28415
28416 Ngqin	1999 VW_{31}	Ng Qin Xiang (born 1993) was awarded second place in the 2011 Intel International Science and Engineering Fair for his environmental management team project.	JPL · 28416
28417 Leewei	1999 VA_{50}	Lee Liang Matthew Wei (born 1993) was awarded second place in the 2011 Intel International Science and Engineering Fair for his environmental management team project.	JPL · 28417
28418 Pornwasu	1999 VQ_{54}	Pornwasu Pongtheerawan (born 1994) was awarded best of category and first place in the 2011 Intel International Science and Engineering Fair for his environmental management team project.	JPL · 28418
28419 Tanpitcha	1999 VA_{67}	Tanpitcha Phongchaipaiboon (born 1993) was awarded best of category and first place in the 2011 Intel International Science and Engineering Fair for her environmental management team project.	JPL · 28419
28425 Sungkanit	1999 XL_{24}	Arada Sungkanit (born 1994) was awarded best of category and first place in the 2011 Intel International Science and Engineering Fair for her environmental management team project.	JPL · 28425
28426 Sangani	1999 XV_{28}	Kunal Ashok Sangani (born 1994) was awarded first place in the 2011 Intel International Science and Engineering Fair for his environmental management team project.	JPL · 28426
28427 Gidwani	1999 XP_{42}	Mishka Gidwani (born 1993) was awarded first place in the 2011 Intel International Science and Engineering Fair for her environmental management team project.	JPL · 28427
28428 Ankurvaishnav	1999 XQ_{43}	Ankur Kanjibhai Vaishnav (born 1994) was awarded second place in the 2011 Intel International Science and Engineering Fair for his environmental management team project.	JPL · 28428
28433 Samarquez	1999 XP_{175}	Samantha Marie Marquez (born 1995) was awarded best of category and first place in the 2011 Intel International Science and Engineering Fair for her materials and bioengineering project.	JPL · 28433
28436 Davesawyer	1999 XJ_{230}	David Sawyer (b. 1959) has been the Technical Project Manager at Lowell Observatory since 2017, managing projects such as the Astronomy Discovery Center and the Yale EXPRES (EXtreme PREcision Spectrometer) at the Lowell Discovery Telescope.	IAU · 28436
28437 Belényu	1999 YJ_{16}	Belén Yu Irureta-Goyena Chang, Spanish astronomer.	IAU · 28437
28438 Venkateswaran	2000 AG_{30}	Shyam Venkateswaran (born 1993) was awarded second place in the 2011 Intel International Science and Engineering Fair for his materials and bioengineering project.	JPL · 28438
28439 Miguelreyes	2000 AM_{30}	Miguel Arnold Silverio Reyes (born 1995) was awarded second place in the 2011 Intel International Science and Engineering Fair for his materials and bioengineering project.	JPL · 28439
28442 Nicholashuey	2000 AN_{61}	Nicholas Michael Huey (born 1992) was awarded second place in the 2011 Intel International Science and Engineering Fair for his materials and bioengineering project.	JPL · 28442
28443 Crisara	2000 AP_{86}	Alexander Raymond Crisara (born 1994) was awarded first place in the 2011 Intel International Science and Engineering Fair for his materials and bioengineering team project.	JPL · 28443
28444 Alexrabii	2000 AP_{91}	Alexander Jahan Rabii (born 1996) was awarded first place in the 2011 Intel International Science and Engineering Fair for his materials and bioengineering team project.	JPL · 28444
28446 Davlantes	2000 AQ_{96}	Christopher Joseph Davlantes (born 1993) was awarded second place in the 2011 Intel International Science and Engineering Fair for his energy and transportation project.	JPL · 28446
28447 Arjunmathur	2000 AW_{96}	Arjun Mathur (born 1993) was awarded second place in the 2011 Intel International Science and Engineering Fair for his energy and transportation project.	JPL · 28447
28449 Ericlau	2000 AK_{117}	Eric Lau (born 1994) was awarded second place in the 2011 Intel International Science and Engineering Fair for his energy and transportation project.	JPL · 28449
28450 Saravolz	2000 AB_{119}	Sara Ellen Volz (born 1995) was awarded first place in the 2011 Intel International Science and Engineering Fair for her energy and transportation project.	JPL · 28450
28451 Tylerhoward	2000 AD_{129}	Tyler Trettel Howard (born 1993) was awarded second place in the 2011 Intel International Science and Engineering Fair for his energy and transportation project.	JPL · 28451
28452 Natkondamuri	2000 AD_{130}	Nathan Sai Kondamuri (born 1994) was awarded best of category and first place in the 2011 Intel International Science and Engineering Fair for his energy and transportation project.	JPL · 28452
28453 Alexcecil	2000 AE_{131}	Alexander Michael Cecil (born 1993) was awarded second place in the 2011 Intel International Science and Engineering Fair for his environmental sciences project.	JPL · 28453
28457 Chloeanassis	2000 AX_{143}	Chloe Anassis (born 1995) was awarded second place in the 2011 Intel International Science and Engineering Fair for her environmental sciences project.	JPL · 28457
28460 Ariannepapa	2000 AY_{163}	Arianne Elizabeth Papa (born 1994) was awarded second place in the 2011 Intel International Science and Engineering Fair for her environmental sciences team project.	JPL · 28460
28465 Janesmyth	2000 AQ_{237}	Jane Elizabeth Smyth (born 1993) was awarded second place in the 2011 Intel International Science and Engineering Fair for her environmental sciences team project.	JPL · 28465
28467 Maurentejamie	2000 AA_{244}	Ruth Maurente Jamie (born 1993) was awarded second place in the 2011 Intel International Science and Engineering Fair for her environmental sciences team project.	JPL · 28467
28468 Shichangxu	2000 AG_{246}	Shi Changxu, material-scientist-academician of the Chinese Academy of Sciences and the Chinese Academy of Engineering.	JPL · 28468
28474 Bustamante	2000 BB_{30}	Elisa Bustamante (born 1990) was awarded second place in the 2011 Intel International Science and Engineering Fair for her environmental sciences team project.	JPL · 28474
28475 Garrett	2000 CU	Lawrence Garrett (born 1959) has been the Assistant Coordinator for the Minor Planets Section of the Association of Lunar and Planetary Observers since 1999. He also has several asteroid discoveries to his credit.	JPL · 28475
28479 Varlotta	2000 CF_{26}	David Varlotta (born 1992) was awarded second place in the 2011 Intel International Science and Engineering Fair for his environmental sciences team project.	JPL · 28479
28480 Seojinyoung	2000 CL_{26}	Seo Jinyoung (born 1993) was awarded best of category and first place in the 2011 Intel International Science and Engineering Fair for his environmental sciences team project.	JPL · 28480
28481 Shindongju	2000 CO_{26}	Shin Dongju (born 1993) was awarded best of category and first place in the 2011 Intel International Science and Engineering Fair for his environmental sciences team project.	JPL · 28481
28482 Bauerle	2000 CK_{29}	Matthew Russel Bauerle (born 1994) was awarded best of category and first place in the 2011 Intel International Science and Engineering Fair for his mathematical sciences project.	JPL · 28482
28483 Allenyuan	2000 CJ_{39}	Allen Yuan (born 1993) was awarded first place in the 2011 Intel International Science and Engineering Fair for his mathematical sciences project.	JPL · 28483
28484 Aishwarya	2000 CO_{43}	Aishwarya Ananda Vardhana (born 1994) was awarded second place in the 2011 Intel International Science and Engineering Fair for her mathematical sciences project.	JPL · 28484
28485 Dastidar	2000 CK_{49}	Manosij G. Dastidar (born 1992) was awarded second place in the 2011 Intel International Science and Engineering Fair for his mathematical sciences project.	JPL · 28485
28488 Gautam	2000 CF_{58}	Simanta Gautam (born 1995) was awarded second place in the 2011 Intel International Science and Engineering Fair for his mathematical sciences project.	JPL · 28488
28492 Marik	2000 CM_{59}	Miklós Marik, Hungarian astronomer †	MPC · 28492
28493 Duncan-Lewis	2000 CC_{63}	Christopher Anthony Duncan-Lewis (born 1992) was awarded second place in the 2011 Intel International Science and Engineering Fair for his medicine and health sciences project.	JPL · 28493
28494 Jasmine	2000 CW_{63}	Jasmine Samaiya Roberts (born 1993) was awarded second place in the 2011 Intel International Science and Engineering Fair for her medicine and health sciences project.	JPL · 28494

== 28501–28600 ==
back to top

Named minor planet	Provisional	This minor planet was named for...	Ref · Catalog
28503 Angelazhang	2000 CZ_{82}	Angela Zhang (born 1994) was awarded first place in the 2011 Intel International Science and Engineering Fair for her medicine and health sciences project.	JPL · 28503
28504 Rebeccafaye	2000 CD_{83}	Rebecca Faye Alford (born 1994) was awarded second place in the 2011 Intel International Science and Engineering Fair for her medicine and health sciences project.	JPL · 28504
28505 Sagarrambhia	2000 CP_{83}	Sagar Hitendra Rambhia (born 1994) was awarded first place in the 2011 Intel International Science and Engineering Fair for his medicine and health sciences project.	JPL · 28505
28508 Kishore	2000 CD_{89}	Kishore Balasubramanian (born 1996) was awarded second place in the 2011 Intel International Science and Engineering Fair for his medicine and health sciences project.	JPL · 28508
28509 Feddersen	2000 CB_{92}	Matthew Troy Feddersen (born 1993) was awarded best of category and first place in the 2011 Intel International Science and Engineering Fair for his medicine and health sciences team project.	JPL · 28509
28511 Marggraff	2000 CW_{102}	Blake Marggraff (born 1992) was awarded best in show (the Gordon E. Moore award), best of category, and first place in the 2011 Intel International Science and Engineering Fair for his medicine and health sciences team project.	JPL · 28511
28512 Tanyuan	2000 CG_{103}	Tan Jin Yuan (born 1993) was awarded second place in the 2011 Intel International Science and Engineering Fair for his microbiology project.	JPL · 28512
28513 Guo	2000 CM_{126}	Yanping Guo (born 1960) is the mission trajectory designer of the New Horizons Pluto Kuiper Belt mission.	JPL · 28513
28516 Möbius	2000 DQ_{3}	August Ferdinand Möbius, German mathematician and astronomer.	JPL · 28516
28519 Sweetman	2000 DP_{15}	Michael Sweetman (born 1952) has been an amateur astronomer since the early 1960s, becoming an accomplished artist with his lunar and planetary observations. In recent years he has also been engaged in high-quality imaging of the Moon.	JPL · 28519
28521 Mattmcintyre	2000 DK_{27}	Matthew Karmen McIntyre (born 1992) was awarded second place in the 2011 Intel International Science and Engineering Fair for his microbiology project.	JPL · 28521
28524 Ebright	2000 DA_{52}	Katherine Yon Ebright (born 1993) was awarded second place in the 2011 Intel International Science and Engineering Fair for her microbiology project.	JPL · 28524
28525 Andrewabboud	2000 DY_{57}	Andrew Nickolas Abboud (born 1993) was awarded first place in the 2011 Intel International Science and Engineering Fair for his microbiology project.	JPL · 28525
28527 Kathleenrose	2000 DW_{68}	Kathleen Rose Maguire (born 1993) was awarded second place in the 2011 Intel International Science and Engineering Fair for her microbiology project.	JPL · 28527
28530 Shiyimeng	2000 DR_{71}	Shi Yimeng (born 1992) was awarded first place in the 2011 Intel International Science and Engineering Fair for her physics and astronomy project.	JPL · 28530
28531 Nikbogdanov	2000 DW_{71}	Nikita Michael Bogdanov (born 1993) was awarded second place in the 2011 Intel International Science and Engineering Fair for his physics and astronomy project.	JPL · 28531
28533 Iansohl	2000 DL_{78}	Ian Alexander Sohl (born 1994) was awarded second place in the 2011 Intel International Science and Engineering Fair for his physics and astronomy project. JPL	MPC · 28533
28534 Taylorwilson	2000 DO_{82}	Taylor Ramon Wilson (born 1994) was awarded best of category and first place in the 2011 Intel International Science and Engineering Fair for his physics and astronomy project.	JPL · 28534
28535 Sungjanet	2000 DE_{85}	Sung Janet Yun-Chen (born 1993) was awarded second place in the 2011 Intel International Science and Engineering Fair for her physics and astronomy team project.	JPL · 28535
28536 Hunaiwen	2000 DX_{97}	Hu Nai-Wen (born 1994) was awarded second place in the 2011 Intel International Science and Engineering Fair for her physics and astronomy team project.	JPL · 28536
28537 Kirapowell	2000 DJ_{106}	Kira Elizabeth Powell (born 1994) was awarded best of category and first place in the 2011 Intel International Science and Engineering Fair for her plant sciences project.	JPL · 28537
28538 Ruisong	2000 DY_{106}	Rui Song (born 1995) was awarded second place in the 2011 Intel International Science and Engineering Fair for her plant sciences project.	JPL · 28538
28542 Cespedes-Nano	2000 EE_{10}	Kelvin Russell Cespedes Nano (born 1995) was awarded second place in the 2011 Intel International Science and Engineering Fair for his plant sciences team project.	JPL · 28542
28543 Solis-Gozar	2000 EF_{17}	Angel Francisco Solis Gozar (born 1995) was awarded second place in the 2011 Intel International Science and Engineering Fair for his plant sciences team project.	JPL · 28543
28547 Johannschröter	2000 EB_{21}	Johann Hieronymus Schröter (1745–1816) was a lunar astronomer influenced by William Herschel and who later influenced Karl Ludwig Harding and Fredrich Wilhelm Bessel	JPL · 28547
28551 Paulomi	2000 EO_{36}	Paulomi Bhattacharya (born 1994) is a finalist in the 2013 Intel Science Talent Search, a science competition for high-school seniors, for her chemistry project	JPL · 28551
28553 Bhupatiraju	2000 ED_{39}	Surya Narayanaraju Bhupatiraju (born 1995) is a finalist in the 2013 Intel Science Talent Search, a science competition for high-school seniors, for his mathematics project	JPL · 28553
28554 Adambowman	2000 EB_{41}	Adam Joseph Bowman (born 1995) is a finalist in the 2013 Intel Science Talent Search, a science competition for high-school seniors, for his engineering project.	JPL · 28554
28555 Jenniferchan	2000 EM_{41}	Jennifer Chan (born 1994) is a finalist in the 2013 Intel Science Talent Search, a science competition for high-school seniors, for her biochemistry project	JPL · 28555
28556 Kevinchen	2000 EP_{41}	Kevin Chen (born 1995) is a finalist in the 2013 Intel Science Talent Search, a science competition for high-school seniors, for his engineering project	JPL · 28556
28557 Lillianchin	2000 EY_{43}	Lillian Tiffany Chin (born 1995) is a finalist in the 2013 Intel Science Talent Search, a science competition for high-school seniors, for her bioengineering project	JPL · 28557
28558 Kathcordwell	2000 EV_{44}	Katherine Leigh Cordwell (born 1995) is a finalist in the 2013 Intel Science Talent Search, a science competition for high-school seniors, for her mathematics project	JPL · 28558
28559 Anniedai	2000 ET_{46}	Annie Dai (born 1995) is a finalist in the 2013 Intel Science Talent Search, a science competition for high-school seniors, for her materials science project	JPL · 28559
28563 Dantzler	2000 EF_{57}	Alexa Victoria Dantzler (born 1995) is a finalist in the 2013 Intel Science Talent Search, a science competition for high-school seniors, for her chemistry project	JPL · 28563
28564 Gunderman	2000 EV_{57}	Lane Gunderman (born 1994) is a finalist in the 2013 Intel Science Talent Search, a science competition for high-school seniors, for his chemistry project	JPL · 28564
28568 Jacobjohnson	2000 EU_{64}	Jacob Paul Smullin Johnson (born 1995) is a finalist in the 2013 Intel Science Talent Search, a science competition for high-school seniors, for his bioinformatics and genomics project	JPL · 28568
28569 Kallenbach	2000 ES_{67}	Jonah Kallenbach (born 1995) is a finalist in the 2013 Intel Science Talent Search, a science competition for high-school seniors, for his bioinformatics and genomics project	JPL · 28569
28570 Peterkraft	2000 EW_{75}	Peter Kraft (born 1995) is a finalist in the 2013 Intel Science Talent Search, a science competition for high-school seniors, for his chemistry project	JPL · 28570
28571 Hannahlarson	2000 EZ_{76}	Hannah Kerner Larson (born 1994) is a finalist in the 2013 Intel Science Talent Search, a science competition for high-school seniors, for her mathematics project	JPL · 28571
28572 Salebreton	2000 EH_{79}	Stephen Adam Le Breton (born 1995) is a finalist in the 2013 Intel Science Talent Search, a science competition for high-school seniors, for his medicine and health project	JPL · 28572
28575 McQuaid	2000 ES_{95}	Daniel Conor McQuaid (born 1995) is a finalist in the 2013 Intel Science Talent Search, a science competition for high-school seniors, for his biochemistry project	JPL · 28575
28581 Dyerlytle	2000 ER_{105}	Dyer Lytle (b. 1956), a Software Engineer at Lowell Observatory,	IAU · 28581
28582 Haileyosborn	2000 EB_{106}	Hailey Osborn (b. 1998), a Senior Educator at Lowell Observatory.	IAU · 28582
28583 Mehrotra	2000 EJ_{108}	Pavan N. Mehrotra (born 1995) is a finalist in the 2013 Intel Science Talent Search, a science competition for high-school seniors, for his engineering project	JPL · 28583
28587 Mundkur	2000 EG_{114}	Naethan Sid Mundkur (born 1995) is a finalist in the 2013 Intel Science Talent Search, a science competition for high-school seniors, for his materials science project	JPL · 28587
28589 Nisley	2000 EL_{126}	Ishara Nisley (b. 1995) received her S.B. degree from MIT in planetary science in 2017, then joined Lowell Observatory in 2017 as an Observer Technician for the Navy Precision Optical Interferometer. She has been working as an Observer/Operator at the Lowell Discovery Telescope since 2019.	IAU · 28589
28590 Kyledilger	2000 EX_{126}	Kyle Dilger (b. 1986) shares his time and talent with Lowell Observatory, serving on the Observatory's Advisory Board and its Marketing Committee	IAU · 28590
28591 Racheldilger	2000 EC_{130}	Rachel Dilger (b. 1985) dreamed of joining a space program since childhood. Rachel's involvement with Lowell Observatory's programs has been a way to make that dream come true. Rachel serves on Lowell Observatory's Advisory Board and has volunteered with the Observatory's marketing and technical efforts.	IAU · 28591
28592 O'Leary	2000 EP_{131}	Vincent Jacob O'Leary (born 1995) is a finalist in the 2013 Intel Science Talent Search, a science competition for high-school seniors, for his animal sciences project	JPL · 28592
28593 Ryanhamilton	2000 EZ_{133}	Ryan Hamilton (b. 1983), Lowell Observatory's Head of Instrumentation.	IAU · 28593
28594 Ronaldballouz	2000 EF_{134}	Ronald Ballouz (born 1989) is a postdoctoral scholar at the Lunar and Planetary Laboratory (Tucson, AZ) focusing on computer simulations of grain interactions throughout the Solar System, including the surfaces of small bodies relevant for missions.	IAU · 28594
28598 Apadmanabha	2000 EU_{137}	Akshay Padmanabha (born 1996) is a finalist in the 2013 Intel Science Talent Search, a science competition for high-school seniors, for his bioengineering project	JPL · 28598
28599 Terenzoni	2000 EQ_{138}	Michael Terenzoni (born 1964) served as the Astronomy Coordinator at Flandrau Science Center. He later worked as an Observatory Specialist with Steward Observatory at the University of Arizona. This has made him well known and liked among both the professional and amateur astronomical communities in southern Arizona.	JPL · 28599
28600 Georgelucas	2000 EO_{141}	George Lucas (born 1944) is best known as the director of the films American Graffiti and Star Wars.	JPL · 28600

== 28601–28700 ==
back to top

Named minor planet	Provisional	This minor planet was named for...	Ref · Catalog
28601 Benton	2000 EK_{147}	Julius Benton (born 1949) has been a key member of the Association of Lunar and Planetary Observers (ALPO) serving as Saturn & Venus Coordinators since 1971.	JPL · 28601
28602 Westfall	2000 EL_{147}	John Westfall (born 1938), a Professor Emeritus at San Francisco State University and the former executive director of the Association of Lunar & Planetary Observers (1985–1995)	JPL · 28602
28603 Jenkins	2000 EW_{148}	Jamey Jenkins (born 1955), an American amateur astronomer who served as Assistant Coordinator-Archivist for the Association of Lunar and Planetary Observers from 2003 to 2014 and is author of The Sun and How to Observe It.	JPL · 28603
28607 Jiayipeng	2000 EG_{156}	Jiayi Peng (born 1995) is a finalist in the 2013 Intel Science Talent Search, a science competition for high-school seniors, for her physics and space science project	JPL · 28607
28608 Sblomquist	2000 EU_{157}	Solvay Blomquist (b. 1998) received her B.S. degree from Northern Arizona University in Astronomy and Mathematics in 2020. Solvay joined Lowell Observatory in 2020 where she continues to work as an Observer Technician for the Navy Precision Optical Interferometer and Research Assistant for Lowell Observatory.	IAU · 28608
28609 Tsirvoulis	2000 EL_{158}	Georgios Tsirvoulis (born 1987) is a postdoctoral researcher at the Luleå University of Technology (Sweden) whose studies include the identification and long-term dynamical evolution of collisional asteroid families.	IAU · 28609
28610 Stephenriggs	2000 EM_{158}	Stephen Riggs (b. 1956), Lowell Observatory's Senior Philanthropy Manager.	IAU · 28610
28611 Liliapopova	2000 EW_{169}	Lilia Popova (born 1995) is a finalist in the 2013 Intel Science Talent Search, a science competition for high-school seniors, for her plant science project	JPL · 28611
28614 Vejvoda	2000 FO_{8}	Jaromír Vejvoda, Czech musician, bandmaster and composer †	MPC · 28614
28618 Scibelli	2000 FK_{17}	Samantha Marie Scibelli (born 1995) is a finalist in the 2013 Intel Science Talent Search, a science competition for high-school seniors, for her physics and space science project	JPL · 28618
28620 Anicia	2000 FE_{26}	Anicia Arredondo (b. 1994) is an American astronomer.	IAU · 28620
28621 Marcfries	2000 FZ_{28}	Marc Douglas Fries (b. 1972) is an American planetary scientist and the cosmic dust collection curator at NASA Johnson Space Center.	IAU · 28621
28622 Gabadirwe	2000 FJ_{29}	Mohutsiwa Gabadirwe (b. 1968), a senior geologist from Botswana at the Botswana Geoscience Institute in Lobatse.	IAU · 28622
28623 Olivermoses	2000 FX_{29}	Oliver Moses (b. 1972), a Botswanese senior research scholar in climate change science at the Okavango Research Institute of the University of Botswana in Maun, Botswana.	IAU · 28623
28625 Selvakumar	2000 FQ_{32}	Raja Selvakumar (born 1995) is a finalist in the 2013 Intel Science Talent Search, a science competition for high-school seniors, for his biochemistry project	JPL · 28625
28626 Meghanshea	2000 FR_{32}	Meghan Marjorie Shea (born 1994) is a finalist in the 2013 Intel Science Talent Search, a science competition for high-school seniors, for her environmental science project	JPL · 28626
28628 Kensenshi	2000 FF_{34}	Kensen Shi (born 1995) is a finalist in the 2013 Intel Science Talent Search, a science competition for high-school seniors, for his computer science project	JPL · 28628
28629 Solimano	2000 FT_{34}	Jamie Lee Solimano (born 1995) is a finalist in the 2013 Intel Science Talent Search, a science competition for high-school seniors, for her microbiology project	JPL · 28629
28630 Mayuri	2000 FK_{35}	Mayuri Sridhar (born 1995) is a finalist in the 2013 Intel Science Talent Search, a science competition for high-school seniors, for her biochemistry project	JPL · 28630
28631 Jacktakahashi	2000 FX_{36}	Jack Ryan Takahashi (born 1995) is a finalist in the 2013 Intel Science Talent Search, a science competition for high-school seniors, for his medicine and health project	JPL · 28631
28632 Christraver	2000 FF_{37}	Chris Traver (born 1995) is a finalist in the 2013 Intel Science Talent Search, a science competition for high-school seniors, for his behavioral and social sciences project	JPL · 28632
28633 Ratripathi	2000 FK_{37}	Raghav Tripathi (born 1995) is a finalist in the 2013 Intel Science Talent Search, a science competition for high-school seniors, for his biochemistry project	JPL · 28633
28636 Vasudevan	2000 FK_{45}	Sahana Vasudevan (born 1997) is a finalist in the 2013 Intel Science Talent Search, a science competition for high-school seniors, for her mathematics project	JPL · 28636
28638 Joywang	2000 FE_{49}	Joy Yiran Wang (born 1995) is a finalist in the 2013 Intel Science Talent Search, a science competition for high-school seniors, for her chemistry project	JPL · 28638
28640 Cathywong	2000 FQ_{49}	Catherine Wong (born 1995) is a finalist in the 2013 Intel Science Talent Search, a science competition for high-school seniors, for her bioengineering project	JPL · 28640
28642 Zbarsky	2000 FZ_{49}	Samuel Zbarsky (born 1995) is a finalist in the 2013 Intel Science Talent Search, a science competition for high-school seniors, for his mathematics project	JPL · 28642
28643 Kellyzhang	2000 FB_{50}	Kelly Zhang (born 1995) is a finalist in the 2013 Intel Science Talent Search, a science competition for high-school seniors, for her bioengineering project	JPL · 28643
28644 Michaelzhang	2000 FD_{56}	Michael Zhang (born 1994) is a finalist in the 2013 Intel Science Talent Search, a science competition for high-school seniors, for his behavioral and social sciences project. He attends the Smithtown High School East, Saint James, New York	JPL · 28644
28646 Alemran	2000 FO_{62}	Al Emran (b. 1989) is a Bangladeshi planetary scientist at NASA's Jet Propulsion Laboratory. He has applied advanced statistical techniques to spectral images of Pluto.	IAU · 28646
28652 Andybramante	2000 GM_{15}	Andrew Bramante mentored a finalist in the 2013 Intel Science Talent Search, a science competition for high-school seniors	JPL · 28652
28653 Charliebrucker	2000 GC_{16}	Charles F. Brucker mentored a finalist in the 2013 Intel Science Talent Search, a science competition for high-school seniors	JPL · 28653
28654 Davidcaine	2000 GY_{20}	David Caine mentored a finalist in the 2013 Intel Science Talent Search, a science competition for high-school seniors	JPL · 28654
28655 Erincolfax	2000 GY_{25}	Erin Colfax mentored a finalist in the 2013 Intel Science Talent Search, a science competition for high-school seniors	JPL · 28655
28656 Doreencurtin	2000 GH_{28}	Doreen Curtin mentored a finalist in the 2013 Intel Science Talent Search, a science competition for high-school seniors	JPL · 28656
28657 Briandempsey	2000 GM_{28}	Brian Dempsey mentored a finalist in the 2013 Intel Science Talent Search, a science competition for high-school seniors	JPL · 28657
28660 Derbes	2000 GP_{38}	David Derbes mentored a finalist in the 2013 Intel Science Talent Search, a science competition for high-school seniors	JPL · 28660
28661 Jimdickens	2000 GE_{39}	James Dickens mentored a finalist in the 2013 Intel Science Talent Search, a science competition for high-school seniors	JPL · 28661
28662 Ericduran	2000 GL_{39}	Eric Duran mentored a finalist in the 2013 Intel Science Talent Search, a science competition for high-school seniors	JPL · 28662
28664 Maryellenfay	2000 GV_{48}	Mary Ellen Fay mentored a finalist in the 2013 Intel Science Talent Search, a science competition for high-school seniors	JPL · 28664
28665 Theresafultz	2000 GN_{51}	Theresa Fultz mentored a finalist in the 2013 Intel Science Talent Search, a science competition for high-school seniors	JPL · 28665
28666 Trudygessler	2000 GO_{51}	Trudy Gessler mentored a finalist in the 2013 Intel Science Talent Search, a science competition for high-school seniors	JPL · 28666
28667 Whithagins	2000 GW_{53}	Whitney Hagins mentored a finalist in the 2013 Intel Science Talent Search, a science competition for high-school seniors	JPL · 28667
28669 Bradhelsel	2000 GG_{55}	Bradley Helsel mentored a finalist in the 2013 Intel Science Talent Search, a science competition for high-school seniors	JPL · 28669
28672 Karolhiggins	2000 GH_{56}	Karol Higgins mentored a finalist in the 2013 Intel Science Talent Search, a science competition for high-school seniors	JPL · 28672
28673 Valholmes	2000 GT_{56}	Valerie M. Holmes mentored a finalist in the 2013 Intel Science Talent Search, a science competition for high-school seniors	JPL · 28673
28675 Suejohnston	2000 GB_{60}	Susanne C. Johnston mentored a finalist in the 2013 Intel Science Talent Search, a science competition for high-school seniors	JPL · 28675
28676 Bethkoester	2000 GK_{66}	Beth Koester mentored a finalist in the 2013 Intel Science Talent Search, a science competition for high-school seniors	JPL · 28676
28677 Laurakowalski	2000 GO_{66}	Laura Kowalski mentored a finalist in the 2013 Intel Science Talent Search, a science competition for high-school seniors	JPL · 28677
28678 Lindquester	2000 GN_{67}	Terri E. Lindquester mentored a finalist in the 2013 Intel Science Talent Search, a science competition for high-school seniors	JPL · 28678
28680 Sandralitvin	2000 GA_{69}	Sandra Litvin mentored a finalist in the 2013 Intel Science Talent Search, a science competition for high-school seniors	JPL · 28680
28681 Loseke	2000 GH_{70}	Meghann Loseke mentored a finalist in the 2013 Intel Science Talent Search, a science competition for high-school seniors	JPL · 28681
28682 Newhams	2000 GQ_{70}	Mike Newhams mentored a finalist in the 2013 Intel Science Talent Search, a science competition for high-school seniors	JPL · 28682
28683 Victorostrik	2000 GV_{70}	Victor Ostrik mentored a finalist in the 2013 Intel Science Talent Search, a science competition for high-school seniors	JPL · 28683
28686 Tamsenprofit	2000 GK_{74}	Tamsen Profit mentored a finalist in the 2013 Intel Science Talent Search, a science competition for high-school seniors	JPL · 28686
28687 Reginareals	2000 GP_{74}	Regina A. Reals mentored a finalist in the 2013 Intel Science Talent Search, a science competition for high-school seniors	JPL · 28687
28688 Diannerister	2000 GQ_{74}	Dianne E. Rister mentored a finalist in the 2013 Intel Science Talent Search, a science competition for high-school seniors	JPL · 28688
28689 Rohrback	2000 GA_{75}	Joan Rohrback mentored a finalist in the 2013 Intel Science Talent Search, a science competition for high-school seniors	JPL · 28689
28690 Beshellem	2000 GT_{75}	Bernie Shellem mentored a finalist in the 2013 Intel Science Talent Search, a science competition for high-school seniors	JPL · 28690
28692 Chanleysmall	2000 GA_{78}	Chanley M. Small mentored a finalist in the 2013 Intel Science Talent Search, a science competition for high-school seniors	JPL · 28692
28695 Zwanzig	(2000 GP_{86)}	Glenn "Skip" Zwanzig mentored a finalist in the 2013 Intel Science Talent Search, a science competition for high-school seniors	JPL · 28695
28697 Eitanacks	2000 GZ_{88}	Eitan Samuel Acks (born 1999) is a finalist in the 2013 Broadcom MASTERS, a math and science competition for middle school students, for his engineering project.	JPL · 28697
28698 Aakshi	2000 GF_{89}	Aakshi Agarwal (born 1999) is a finalist in the 2013 Broadcom MASTERS, a math and science competition for middle school students, for her biochemistry, medicine, health science, and microbiology project.	JPL · 28698
28700 Balachandar	2000 GB_{90}	Sidhika Balachandar (born 1999) is a finalist in the 2013 Broadcom MASTERS, a math and science competition for middle school students, for her physical sciences project.	JPL · 28700

== 28701–28800 ==
back to top

Named minor planet	Provisional	This minor planet was named for...	Ref · Catalog
28705 Michaelbecker	2000 GW_{91}	Michael David Becker (born 1999) is a finalist in the 2013 Broadcom MASTERS, a math and science competition for middle school students, for his physical sciences project.	JPL · 28705
28707 Drewbecker	2000 GZ_{94}	Drew William Becker (born 2000) is a finalist in the 2013 Broadcom MASTERS, a math and science competition for middle school students, for his environmental sciences project.	JPL · 28707
28710 Rebeccab	2000 GY_{100}	Rebecca Ann Bloomfield (born 1999) is a finalist in the 2013 Broadcom MASTERS, a math and science competition for middle school students, for her earth and space sciences project.	JPL · 28710
28711 Oliverburnett	2000 GE_{101}	Oliver Burnett (born 2000) is a finalist in the 2013 Broadcom MASTERS, a math and science competition for middle school students, for his earth and space sciences project. He attends the Ellis School, Pittsburgh, Pennsylvania.	IAU · 28711
28712 Elizabethcorn	2000 GT_{102}	Elizabeth Alyn Corn (born 1999) is a finalist in the 2013 Broadcom MASTERS, a math and science competition for middle school students, for her biochemistry, medicine, health science, and microbiology project.	JPL · 28712
28714 Gandall	2000 GY_{102}	Keoni K. Gandall (born 1999) is a finalist in the 2013 Broadcom MASTERS, a math and science competition for middle school students, for his biochemistry, medicine, health science, and microbiology project.	JPL · 28714
28715 Garimella	2000 GW_{103}	Mihir Tejas Garimella (born 1999) is a finalist in the 2013 Broadcom MASTERS, a math and science competition for middle school students, for his engineering project.	JPL · 28715
28716 Calebgonser	2000 GP_{104}	Caleb Allen Tuttle Gonser (born 2000) is a finalist in the 2013 Broadcom MASTERS, a math and science competition for middle school students, for his animal & plant sciences project.	JPL · 28716
28718 Rivergrace	2000 GH_{107}	River Connell Grace (born 1999) is a finalist in the 2013 Broadcom MASTERS, a math and science competition for middle school students, for his animal & plant sciences project.	JPL · 28718
28719 Sahoolahan	2000 GN_{107}	Seamus Andrew Hoolahan (born 2000) is a finalist in the 2013 Broadcom MASTERS, a math and science competition for middle school students, for his physical sciences project.	JPL · 28719
28720 Krystalrose	2000 GV_{107}	Krystal Rose Horton (born 2001) is a finalist in the 2013 Broadcom MASTERS, a math and science competition for middle school students, for her animal & plant sciences project.	JPL · 28720
28722 Dhruviyer	2000 GN_{108}	Dhruv Iyer (born 1999) is a finalist in the 2013 Broadcom MASTERS, a math and science competition for middle school students, for his mathematics and computer science project.	JPL · 28722
28723 Cameronjones	2000 GX_{108}	Cameron Cole Jones (born 2001) is a finalist in the 2013 Broadcom MASTERS, a math and science competition for middle school students, for his engineering project.	JPL · 28723
28724 Stott	2000 GG_{111}	Nicole Stott (b. 1962), an American retired astronaut, aquanaut, engineer, and artist.	IAU · 28724
28726 Kailey-Steiner	2000 GM_{113}	Johann Rod Kailey-Steiner (born 1999) is a finalist in the 2013 Broadcom MASTERS, a math and science competition for middle school students, for his engineering project.	JPL · 28726
28729 Moivre	2000 GF_{123}	Abraham de Moivre (1667–1754), French mathematician.	JPL · 28729
28732 Rheakamat	2000 GF_{124}	Rhea G. Kamat (born 1998) is a finalist in the 2013 Broadcom MASTERS, a math and science competition for middle school students, for her animal & plant sciences project.	JPL · 28732
28734 Austinmccoy	2000 GK_{125}	Austin Sagan McCoy (born 2000) is a finalist in the 2013 Broadcom MASTERS, a math and science competition for middle school students, for his biochemistry, medicine, health science, and microbiology project.	JPL · 28734
28737 Mohindra	2000 GR_{133}	Smita Mohindra (born 2000) is a finalist in the 2013 Broadcom MASTERS, a math and science competition for middle school students, for her engineering project..	JPL · 28737
28738 Carolinolan	2000 GQ_{135}	Caroline Grace Nolan (born 2000) is a finalist in the 2013 Broadcom MASTERS, a math and science competition for middle school students, for her animal & plant sciences project.	JPL · 28738
28739 Julisauer	2000 GW_{135}	Julienne Isabelle Sauer (born 1999) is a finalist in the 2013 Broadcom MASTERS, a math and science competition for middle school students, for her physical sciences project.	JPL · 28739
28740 Nathansperry	2000 GZ_{135}	Nathaniel Poort Sperry (born 1999) is a finalist in the 2013 Broadcom MASTERS, a math and science competition for middle school students, for his physical sciences project.	JPL · 28740
28742 Hannahsteele	2000 GA_{137}	Hannah Mae Steele (born 2000) is a finalist in the 2013 Broadcom MASTERS, a math and science competition for middle school students, for her earth and space sciences project.	JPL · 28742
28743 Schuitemaker	2000 GO_{142}	Michiel Schuitemaker (b. 1964) is an American businessman and served as a member of the Advisory Board of Lowell Observatory since 2023.	IAU · 28743
28744 Annikagustafsson	2000 GK_{143}	Annika L. Gustafsson (b. 1992), an American astronomer.	IAU · 28744
28747 Swintosky	2000 GF_{151}	Megan Christine Swintosky (born 1999) is a finalist in the 2013 Broadcom MASTERS, a math and science competition for middle school students, for her biochemistry, medicine, health science, and microbiology project.	JPL · 28747
28750 Brennawallin	2000 GN_{165}	Brenna Caroline Wallin (born 2001) is a finalist in the 2013 Broadcom MASTERS, a math and science competition for middle school students, for her environmental sciences project.	JPL · 28750
28751 Eggl	2000 GT_{167}	Siegfried Eggl (b. 1981), an Austrian professor at the University of Illinois Urbana-Champaign.	IAU · 28751
28757 Seanweber	2000 HQ_{9}	Sean Austin Weber (born 2000) is a finalist in the 2013 Broadcom MASTERS, a math and science competition for middle school students, for his animal & plant sciences project.	JPL · 28757
28759 Joshwentzel	2000 HD_{11}	Joshua Wentzel (born 1999) is a finalist in the 2013 Broadcom MASTERS, a math and science competition for middle school students, for his physical sciences project.	JPL · 28759
28760 Grantwomble	2000 HN_{12}	Grant Donovan Womble (born 2000) is a finalist in the 2013 Broadcom MASTERS, a math and science competition for middle school students, for his engineering project. JPL	MPC · 28760
28765 Katherinewu	2000 HY_{13}	Katherine Jean Wu (born 2000) is a finalist in the 2013 Broadcom MASTERS, a math and science competition for middle school students, for her behavioral and social sciences project.	JPL · 28765
28766 Monge	2000 HP_{14}	Gaspard Monge, French mathematician.	JPL · 28766
28769 Elisabethadams	2000 HC_{26}	Elisabeth R. Adams (b. 1981) is an American senior scientist at the Planetary Science Institute (based in Somerville, MA).	IAU · 28769
28770 Sarahrines	2000 HC_{27}	Sarah Rines mentored a finalist in the 2013 Broadcom MASTERS, a math and science competition for middle school students.	JPL · 28770
28772 Bonamico	2000 HE_{34}	Roberto Bonamico (b. 1955), an Italian amateur astronomer.	IAU · 28772
28778 Michdelucia	2000 HG_{46}	Michelle DeLucia mentored a finalist in the 2013 Broadcom MASTERS, a math and science competition for middle school students.	JPL · 28778
28779 Acthieke	2000 HV_{46}	Adrienne C. Thieke mentored a finalist in the 2013 Broadcom MASTERS, a math and science competition for middle school students.	JPL · 28779
28780 Lisadeaver	2000 HD_{47}	Lisa Deaver mentored a finalist in the 2013 Broadcom MASTERS, a math and science competition for middle school students	JPL · 28780
28781 Timothylohr	2000 HS_{48}	Timothy Lohr mentored a finalist in the 2013 Broadcom MASTERS, a math and science competition for middle school students.	JPL · 28781
28782 Mechling	2000 HE_{49}	Kim Mechling mentored a finalist in the 2013 Broadcom MASTERS, a math and science competition for middle school students.	JPL · 28782
28784 Deringer	2000 HT_{51}	Nancy Deringer mentored a finalist in the 2013 Broadcom MASTERS, a math and science competition for middle school students.	JPL · 28784
28785 Woodjohn	2000 HN_{52}	John Wood mentored a finalist in the 2013 Broadcom MASTERS, a math and science competition for middle school students.	JPL · 28785
28787 Peterpinko	2000 HR_{54}	Peter Pinko mentored a finalist in the 2013 Broadcom MASTERS, a math and science competition for middle school students.	JPL · 28787
28788 Hayes-Gehrke	2000 HW_{57}	Melissa Hayes-Gehrke (born 1973) is an astronomy instructor at the University of Maryland who introduces the techniques of asteroid light curve photometry as a method of teaching observational astronomy, with students often producing publishable results.	IAU · 28788
28791 Edithsykeslowell	2000 HW_{59}	Edith Sykes Lowell (born 1927), with her husband David, have been supporters of Lowell Observatory. Edith is the granddaughter of Godfrey Sykes. The Sykes brothers (Stanley and Godfrey) built the dome which houses Lowell's 24-inch historic refractor telescope.	IAU · 28791
28792 Davidlowell	2000 HE_{61}	James David Lowell (1928–2020) was a long-time supporter of Lowell Observatory. He was a descendant of Percival Lowell, who brought the family to the U.S. from England in the 1600s. James had a degree in geology and located a large copper mine in Chile and a major gold mine in Peru.	IAU · 28792
28793 Donaldpaul	2000 HM_{61}	Donald Paul (born 1946) is a long-time member of Lowell Observatory's advisory board. Don supported the Giovale Open Deck Observatory with a TEC telescope which enhances visitors views of the Solar System.	IAU · 28793
28794 Crowley	2000 HG_{64}	Leo Crowley (born 1942) is a long-time member of Lowell Observatory's advisory board. Leo serves on Lowell's executive committee and as Chair of Lowell's Audit Committee.	IAU · 28794
28795 Alexelbert	2000 HO_{64}	Alex Elbert (born 1996), Communication Designer at Lowell Observatory.	IAU · 28795
28796 Ragozzine	2000 HW_{65}	Darin Ragozzine (b. 1981), an American planetary scientist at Brigham Young University (USA).	IAU · 28796
28798 Audreymartin	2000 HJ_{69}	Audrey Martin (b. 1991), an American planetary spectroscopist.	IAU · 28798
28799 Christopherford	2000 HB_{72}	Christopher Ford (b. 1959) is a leading American authority in computer graphics and media development in film visual effects, game and video production, and astronomical visualization.	IAU · 28799
28800 Speth	2000 HV_{75}	Dustin Speth mentored a finalist in the 2013 Broadcom MASTERS, a math and science competition for middle school students.	JPL · 28800

== 28801–28900 ==
back to top

Named minor planet	Provisional	This minor planet was named for...	Ref · Catalog
28801 Maryanderson	2000 HJ_{76}	Mary Anderson mentored a finalist in the 2013 Broadcom MASTERS, a math and science competition for middle school students.	JPL · 28801
28802 Boborino	2000 HX_{77}	Bob Orino mentored a finalist in the 2013 Broadcom MASTERS, a math and science competition for middle school students.	JPL · 28802
28803 Roe	2000 HR_{79}	Henry G. Roe (born 1975), is an assistant astronomer at Lowell Observatory	JPL · 28803
28805 Föhring	2000 HY_{85}	Dora Föhring (b. 1987), a Hungarian astronomer.	IAU · 28805
28807 Lisawaller	2000 HC_{90}	Lisa Waller mentored a finalist in the 2013 Broadcom MASTERS, a math and science competition for middle school students.	JPL · 28807
28808 Ananthnarayan	2000 HO_{96}	Vidya Ananthnarayan mentored a finalist in the 2013 Broadcom MASTERS, a math and science competition for middle school students.	JPL · 28808
28809 Pierrebeck	2000 HY_{102}	Pierre Beck (b. 1980), a French geologist.	IAU · 28809
28810 Suchandler	2000 JS_{5}	Suzanne Chandler mentored a finalist in the 2013 Broadcom MASTERS, a math and science competition for middle school students.	JPL · 28810
28813 Jeffreykurtz	2000 JV_{14}	Jeffrey Kurtz mentored a finalist in the 2013 Broadcom MASTERS, a math and science competition for middle school students.	JPL · 28813
28816 Kimneville	2000 JC_{18}	Kim Neville mentored a finalist in the 2013 Broadcom MASTERS, a math and science competition for middle school students.	JPL · 28816
28817 Simoneflood	2000 JJ_{20}	Simone Flood mentored a finalist in the 2013 Broadcom MASTERS, a math and science competition for middle school students.	JPL · 28817
28818 Kellyryan	2000 JQ_{20}	Kelly Ryan mentored a finalist in the 2013 Broadcom MASTERS, a math and science competition for middle school students.	JPL · 28818
28819 Karinritchey	2000 JX_{20}	Karin Ritchey mentored a finalist in the 2013 Broadcom MASTERS, a math and science competition for middle school students.	JPL · 28819
28820 Sylrobertson	2000 JJ_{24}	Sylvia Robertson mentored a finalist in the 2013 Broadcom MASTERS, a math and science competition for middle school students.	JPL · 28820
28821 Harryanselmo	2000 JV_{24}	Sylvia Robertson mentored a finalist in the 2013 Broadcom MASTERS, a math and science competition for middle school students.	JPL · 28821
28822 Angelabarker	2000 JW_{25}	Angela Barker mentored a finalist in the 2013 Broadcom MASTERS, a math and science competition for middle school students.	JPL · 28822
28823 Archibald	2000 JM_{26}	Angela Barker mentored a finalist in the 2013 Broadcom MASTERS, a math and science competition for middle school students.	JPL · 28823
28824 Marlablair	2000 JY_{26}	Marla Blair mentored a finalist in the 2013 Broadcom MASTERS, a math and science competition for middle school students.	JPL · 28824
28825 Bryangoehring	2000 JG_{28}	Bryan S. Goehring mentored a finalist in the 2013 Broadcom MASTERS, a math and science competition for middle school students.	JPL · 28825
28828 Aalamiharandi	2000 JT_{29}	Arshia Aalami Harandi (born 1995) was awarded second place in the 2013 Intel International Science and Engineering Fair for his behavioral and social sciences project.	JPL · 28828
28829 Abelsky	2000 JO_{30}	Julia Beth Abelsky (born 1994) was awarded second place in the 2013 Intel International Science and Engineering Fair for her materials and bioengineering project.	JPL · 28829
28831 Abu-Alshaikh	2000 JL_{32}	Salahaldeen Ibrahim Abu-Alshaikh (born 1997) was awarded second place in the 2013 Intel International Science and Engineering Fair for his mathematical sciences project.	JPL · 28831
28832 Akana	2000 JW_{32}	Reid Toshio Kealii Akana (born 1996) was awarded second place in the 2013 Intel International Science and Engineering Fair for his plant sciences project.	JPL · 28832
28833 Arunachalam	2000 JB_{35}	Easun Piraichoody Arunachalam (born 1996) was awarded second place in the 2013 Intel International Science and Engineering Fair for his medicine and health sciences project.	JPL · 28833
28836 Ashmore	2000 JH_{38}	Elisabeth Anne Ashmore (born 1996) was awarded second place in the 2013 Intel International Science and Engineering Fair for her computer science project.	JPL · 28836
28837 Nibalachandar	2000 JN_{38}	Niranjan Balachandar (born 1997) was awarded second place in the 2013 Intel International Science and Engineering Fair for his mathematical sciences team project.	JPL · 28837
28841 Kelseybarter	2000 JK_{45}	Kelsey Mackenzie Barter (born 1996) was awarded second place in the 2013 Intel International Science and Engineering Fair for her biochemistry project.	JPL · 28841
28842 Bhowmik	2000 JO_{45}	Aprotim Cory Bhowmik (born 1996) was awarded second place in the 2013 Intel International Science and Engineering Fair for his medicine and health sciences project.	JPL · 28842
28848 Nicolemarie	2000 JH_{53}	Nicole Marie Biddinger (born 1995) was awarded first place in the 2013 Intel International Science and Engineering Fair for her animal sciences project.	JPL · 28848
28851 Londonbolsius	2000 JE_{55}	London Reeve Bolsius (born 1997) was awarded second place in the 2013 Intel International Science and Engineering Fair for his computer science project.	JPL · 28851
28852 Westonbraun	2000 JH_{55}	Weston Daniel Braun (born 1995) was awarded second place in the 2013 Intel International Science and Engineering Fair for his electrical and mechanical engineering project.	JPL · 28852
28853 Bukhamsin	2000 JX_{55}	Abdullah Hassan Bu Khamsin (born 1995) was awarded second place in the 2013 Intel International Science and Engineering Fair for his plant sciences project.	JPL · 28853
28854 Budisteanu	2000 JP_{56}	Ionut Alexandru Budisteanu (born 1993) was awarded best of category and first place in the 2013 Intel International Science and Engineering Fair for his computer science project.	JPL · 28854
28855 Burchell	2000 JN_{57}	Sydney Veronica Burchell (born 1996) was awarded first place in the 2013 Intel International Science and Engineering Fair for her environmental management team project.	JPL · 28855
28860 Cappelletto	2000 JQ_{60}	Massimo Cappelletto (born 1993) was awarded second place in the 2013 Intel International Science and Engineering Fair for his energy and transportation team project.	JPL · 28860
28864 Franciscocordova	2000 JG_{70}	Francisco Cordova (b. 1984), a Puerto Rican engineer and former director of the Arecibo Observatory (2016–2022)	IAU · 28864
28866 Chakraborty	2000 JX_{75}	Uttara Chakraborty (born 1995) was awarded second place in the 2013 Intel International Science and Engineering Fair for her computer science project.	JPL · 28866
28868 Rianchandra	2000 JN_{77}	Rian Naveen Chandra (born 1995) was awarded second place in the 2013 Intel International Science and Engineering Fair for his physics and astronomy team project.	JPL · 28868
28869 Chaubal	2000 JA_{84}	Manotri Chaubal (born 1996) was awarded second place in the 2013 Intel International Science and Engineering Fair for her cellular and molecular biology project.	JPL · 28869
28874 Michaelchen	2000 KC_{15}	Michael Zhu Chen (born 1996) was awarded first place in the 2013 Intel International Science and Engineering Fair for his chemistry project.	JPL · 28874
28878 Segner	2000 KL_{41}	Ján Andrej Segner (Johan Andreas von Segner), Carpatho-German mathematician, physicist, doctor †	MPC · 28878
28883 Kouveliotou	2000 KS_{52}	Chryssa Kouveliotou (b. 1953) has been a leader in high energy astrophysics. Starting as a professor in her native Greece, she spent most of her career in the USA, working for NASA and, later, George Washington University.	IAU · 28883
28884 Youngjunchoi	2000 KA_{54}	Young-Jun Choi (born 1969) is a planetary scientist at Korea Astronomy and Space Science Institute (Daejeon, South Korea). He studies photometry and thermal models of Kuiper belt objects and is Co-I of DEEP-South, a project to observe asteroids and comets in the southern sky.	IAU · 28884
28886 Ericajawin	2000 KX_{57}	Erica R. Jawin (born 1989) is a postdoctoral researcher at the Smithsonian National Museum of Natural History (Washington, DC) working on the OSIRIS-REx mission sample site selection. Her wide range of research expertise spans studies of Mars, the Moon, and asteroids.	IAU · 28886
28887 Sabina	2000 KQ_{58}	Sabina Raducan (b. 1993), a Romanian researcher at the University of Bern.	IAU · 28887
28888 Agrusa	2000 KS_{60}	Harrison Agrusa (b. 1995), an American astronomer.	IAU · 28888
28889 Turrentine	2000 KQ_{63}	Kathryn Turrentine (born 1998), Educator at Lowell Observatory.	IAU · 28889
28890 Gabaldon	2000 KY_{65}	Diana J. Gabaldon (b. 1952), an American author.	IAU · 28890
28894 Ryanchung	2000 LT_{8}	Ryan Kyong-Doc Chung (born 1996) was awarded first place in the 2013 Intel International Science and Engineering Fair for his computer science project.	JPL · 28894

== 28901–29000 ==
back to top

Named minor planet	Provisional	This minor planet was named for...	Ref · Catalog
28911 Mishacollins	2000 NB_{16}	Misha Collins (b. 1974), an American actor and artist.	IAU · 28911
28912 Sonahosseini	2000 NL_{26}	Sona Hosseini (born 1982) is a research and instrument scientist at the Jet Propulsion Laboratory. She has led numerous studies to simulate and study low-density gas environments in the Solar System and conceptualized innovative technology to enable such measurements in future NASA missions.	IAU · 28912
28916 Logancollins	2000 OL_{35}	Logan Thrasher Collins (born 1996) was awarded second place in the 2013 Intel International Science and Engineering Fair for his microbiology project.	JPL · 28916
28917 Zacollins	2000 QR_{17}	Zachary White Collins (born 1996) was awarded second place in the 2013 Intel International Science and Engineering Fair for his physics and astronomy team project.	JPL · 28917
28924 Jennanncsele	2000 QD_{205}	Jennifer Ann Csele (born 1996) was awarded first place in the 2013 Intel International Science and Engineering Fair for her physics and astronomy project.	JPL · 28924
28926 Adamnimoy	2000 QE_{231}	Adam Nimoy (born 1956), son of Leonard Nimoy and American television director, filmmaking instructor and one-time attorney specialising in music and music publishing.	JPL · 28926
28932 Izidoro	2000 RY_{102}	André Izidoro (b. 1984), a Brazilian scientist at Rice University in Houston, Texas	IAU · 28932
28934 Meagancurrie	2000 SB_{113}	Meagan Elizabeth Currie (born 1996) was awarded second place in the 2013 Intel International Science and Engineering Fair for her animal sciences project.	JPL · 28934
28935 Kevincyr	2000 SH_{123}	Kevin James Cyr (born 1994) was awarded second place in the 2013 Intel InternationalScience and Engineering Fair for his microbiology project.	JPL · 28935
28936 Dalapati	2000 SF_{139}	Trisha Dalapati (born 1997) was awarded second place in the 2013 Intel International Science and Engineering Fair for her energy and transportation project.	JPL · 28936
28942 Yennydieguez	2000 UJ_{14}	Yenny Dieguez (born 1997) was awarded second place in the 2013 Intel International Science and Engineering Fair for her electrical and mechanical engineering project.	JPL · 28942
28945 Taideding	2000 UA_{79}	Taide Ding (b. 1994) was awarded second place in the 2013 Intel International Science and Engineering Fair for his earth science project.	JPL · 28945
28948 Disalvo	2000 WJ_{34}	Samantha Hayley DiSalvo (born 1996) was awarded best of category and first place in the 2013 Intel International Science and Engineering Fair for her plant sciences team project.	JPL · 28948
28950 Ailisdooner	2000 WF_{133}	Ailis Clare Dooner (born 1996) was awarded second place in the 2013 Intel International Science and Engineering Fair for her biochemistry project.	JPL · 28950
28952 Ericepstein	2000 YG_{35}	Eric Samuel Epstein (born 1995) was awarded second place in the 2013 Intel International Science and Engineering Fair for his animal sciences project.	JPL · 28952
28953 Hollyerickson	2000 YL_{37}	Holly Catherine Erickson (born 1995) was awarded second place in the 2013 Intel International Science and Engineering Fair for her materials and bioengineering project.	JPL · 28953
28954 Feiyiou	2000 YA_{41}	Fei Yiou (born 1995) was awarded second place in the 2013 Intel International Science and Engineering Fair for her electrical and mechanical engineering team project.	JPL · 28954
28955 Kaliadeborah	2000 YZ_{58}	Kalia Deborah Firester (born 1997) was awarded second place in the 2013 Intel International Science and Engineering Fair for her plant sciences project.	JPL · 28955
28957 Danielfulop	2001 BE_{50}	Daniel Jeremy Fulop (born 1995) was awarded first place in the 2013 Intel International Science and Engineering Fair for his cellular and molecular biology project.	JPL · 28957
28958 Binns	2001 CQ_{42}	Hilda Binns (born 1945) is a retired multi-sport athlete who won Canada's first Paralympic gold medal in Tel Aviv in 1968. She won a total of six medals in two Paralympics and many medals and honors in other national and international competitions.	IAU · 28958
28963 Tamyiu	2001 FY_{121}	Tam Yiu (born 1928), a driving instructor by profession, had inspired thousands of followers who study his teachings in Tai Chi philosophy.	JPL · 28963
28964 Ashokverma	2001 FG_{122}	Ashok Kumar Verma (b. 1984), an Indian astrophysicist.	IAU · 28964
28966 Yuyingshih	2001 HS_{24}	Yu Ying-shih (1930–2021) is a renowned Chinese-American historian and Sinologist. He was a tenured professor at Harvard University, Yale University and Princeton University. He won the Tang Prize and used the NT\$10 million prize money to establish the Yu Ying-shih Fellowship for the Humanities.	JPL · 28966
28967 Gerhardter	2001 HK_{34}	Herbert Gerhardter (born 1993) was awarded second place in the 2013 Intel International Science and Engineering Fair for his energy and transportation team project.	JPL · 28967
28968 Gongmiaoxin	2001 HT_{36}	Gong Miaoxin (born 1995) was awarded second place in the 2013 Intel International Science and Engineering Fair for her electrical and mechanical engineering team project.	JPL · 28968
28969 Youngminjeongahn	2001 HM_{57}	Youngmin JeongAhn (born 1980) is a postdoctoral researcher at Korea Astronomy and Space Science Institute (Daejeon, South Korea) who works on dynamics of small Solar System bodies. He has discovered more than one hundred asteroids including four near-Earth objects and twenty Jupiter trojans.	IAU · 28969
28975 Galinborisov	2001 KR_{69}	Galin Borisov (b. 1978), a Bulgarian astronomer.	IAU · 28975
28976 Sevigny	2001 KN_{73}	Melissa Sevigny (born 1986), American science journalist and science reporter at KNAU in Flagstaff, Arizona.	IAU · 28976
28978 Ixion	2001 KX_{76}	Ixion tried to win the love of Hera, but Zeus thwarted this by creating the cloud Nephele, which resembled Hera and by whom Ixion fathered the Centaurs. For his crimes Ixion was bound to a wheel that turns forever in the underworld.	JPL · 28978
28980 Chowyunfat	2001 LS_{1}	Chow Yun-fat (born 1955) is an actor born in Hong Kong. He is best known for his roles as Sao Feng in Pirates of the Caribbean: At World's End. He has won three Hong Kong Film Awards for Best Actor. His simple daily life style has won him the nickname "Son of Hong Kong".	JPL · 28980
28983 Omergranek	2001 LK_{19}	Omer Granek (born 1995) was awarded second place in the 2013 Intel International Science and Engineering Fair for his electrical and mechanical engineering team project.	JPL · 28983
28987 Assafin	2001 MP_{14}	Marcelo Assafin (b. 1964), a Brazilian astronomer.	IAU · 28987
28989 Lenaadams	2001 MZ_{24}	Elena Adams (b. 1979) is an American engineer.	IAU · 28989
28990 Ariheinze	2001 ML_{27}	Aren (Ari) Heinze (born 1979) is a postdoctoral fellow working on ATLAS at the University of Hawai'i (Manoa). His areas of study include Pluto and other dwarf planets, brown dwarfs, and asteroid discoveries.	IAU · 28990
28992 Timbrothers	2001 MW_{28}	Timothy Brothers (b. 1980), an American astronomer.	IAU · 28992
28994 Helenabates	2001 OO_{8}	Helena Bates (b. 1993), a British researcher.	IAU · 28994
28995 Marquess	2001 OF_{46}	Michael Marquess (born 1974), co-founder and CEO of a brewing company in Flagstaff, Arizona.	IAU · 28995

back to top

Preceded by 27,001–28,000	Meanings of minor-planet names List of minor planets: 28,001–29,000	Succeeded by 29,001–30,000
