= Melissa Sevigny =

American science journalist

Melissa L. Sevigny is an American science journalist and author. She works as a science writer for Arizona Public Radio. A native of Tucson, Arizona, she was heavily interested in science as a child, participating in multiple science fairs which led to a love of astronomy. This resulted in her working at the Lunar and Planetary Laboratory (LPL) and being involved with the Phoenix space probe during its Mars landing. Following her graduation with a Master's writing degree, she went into science journalism and published multiple books on the history of science and ecology in the Arizona area. Her books have won a number of awards and nominations.

== Childhood and education ==
Having grown up in Tucson, Arizona, Sevigny gained an interest in science and ecology while observing the Sonoran Desert. She wanted to become a geologist, but after entering a science fair at 14, she won both an asteroid and a trip to a Hawaiian astronomy camp. Her subsequent astrological interests saw her enter annual science fairs with her projects aimed at subjects involving Mars. During her junior year at Pueblo Magnet High School, one of the judges for the fair was Pat Woida from the Phoenix Mars Lander team, who invited her to be a part of the project.

She joined as a volunteer at the Lunar and Planetary Laboratory before obtaining degrees in creative writing and environmental science at the University of Arizona. During this period, she continued to work as an undergraduate intern at LPL and acted as a science outreach correspondent during the Phoenix launch and landing over the course of five months. Her research on conservation had her work at the university's Water Resources Research Center, before taking a summer abroad creative writing course in her final year in Galway, Ireland. For her honors thesis, which was completed in 2010, she conducted several dozen interviews with scientists as a part of her literary work. She went on to graduate school at Iowa State University and continued expanding on her prior thesis publication before acquiring a Master of Fine Arts degree in 2013 on the same fields as her bachelor's. At Iowa State, she spent her time working at the Leopold Center for Sustainable Agriculture.

== Career ==
Sevigny went on to work as a science reporter after graduation, first at the Tucson Citizen before it closed in 2009, and then at Arizona Public Radio. She reported on science and technology stories while continuing other science communication work and becoming an author of scientific histories. The first book she published was titled Mythical River and investigated the history of river conservation in Arizona from the earliest Spanish explorers to now. The mythical Buenaventura River is heavily discussed in relation to the Colorado River and the overuse of river water that has slowly been dwindling the natural resource.

Her second book also in 2016 was titled Under Desert Skies and discussed the history of the early moon missions from Tucson where Gerard Kuiper established the LPL with NASA funding. The book covered the beginning years of the LPL and was created by Sevigny after a request by Mike Drake, former director of the lab, to help preserve the "memories of LPL scientists who worked with Kuiper to establish the lab." Because of this, she ensured her focus was on the real characters themselves, wanting to contain their "personalities" within her work.

Released in 2023, Sevigny's book Brave the Wild River was first conceived when she was looking through the Northern Arizona University archives for research in 2018 and found an exhibit on women botanists Elzada Clover and Lois Jotter. The archive curator was able to procure additional boxes of letters and other items from Jotter, which formed the basis of the book that was written over the following four years. She first used the research material to publish a long-form article in Atavist Magazine before getting a full book signed for publication. In addition to the journal and letters that Jotter kept, and to a lesser extent the sensationalist media coverage from the two botanists' contemporary time period, Sevigny also decided she needed first hand experience on their journey. Thus, she joined a botany research group in 2021 that took a rafting trip along the Colorado through the Grand Canyon to help clear invasive Ravenna grass.

== Awards and honors ==
In 2005, Sevigny was given The Flinn Scholarship by the Flinn Foundation to support her undergraduate work. Her book Mythical River was, prior to its release, given the 2015 Ellen Meloy Desert Writers Award, which included a $3,000 grant to fund further work on the book, and was later a nominee for the 2017 Flagstaff Viola Awards.

Her third book, Brave the Wild River, was given a National Outdoor Book Award in History, was named one of the Best Books of 2023 by the New Yorker, was placed on the 2024 longlist in nonfiction for the Andrew Carnegie Medals for Excellence in Fiction and Nonfiction, was bestowed the Reading the West Award in memoir and biography, was chosen by the Arizona State Library as a 2024 Southwest Books of the Year Top Pick, was selected as a 2023 Top of the List winner by Booklist, and was conferred an honorable mention in the 2024 Rachel Carson Environment Book Awards from the Society of Environmental Journalists.

== Bibliography ==
- — (2016). Mythical River: Chasing the Mirage of New Water in the American Southwest. University of Iowa Press. p. 272. ISBN 9781609383930.
- — (2016). Under Desert Skies: How Tucson Mapped the Way to the Moon and Planets. University of Arizona Press. p. 184. ISBN 9780816533817.
- — (2023). Brave the Wild River: The Untold Story of Two Women Who Mapped the Botany of the Grand Canyon. W. W. Norton. p. 304. ISBN 9780393868241.
