= Bruce Elmegreen =

American astronomer

Bruce Gordon Elmegreen
- Born: February 24, 1950 (age 76); Milwaukee, Wisconsin
- Citizenship: United States
- Education: University of Wisconsin–Madison (1971, BS); Princeton University (1975, PhD)
- Spouse: Debra Elmegreen
- Awards: Dannie Heineman Prize for Astrophysics (2001); Catherine Wolfe Bruce Medal of the Astronomical Society of the Pacific (2021)
- Scientific career
- Fields: Astrophysics
- Institutions: Harvard University (1975-1978); Columbia University (1978-1984); IBM (1984-2023)
- Academic advisors: Lyman Spitzer

Bruce Gordon Elmegreen (born 24 February 1950) is an American astronomer.

== Life ==
Elmegreen was born in Milwaukee, and received his bachelor's degree in 1971 from the University of Wisconsin–Madison and his PhD in 1975 from Princeton University in astrophysics under Lyman Spitzer. From 1975 to 1978 he was a Junior Fellow at Harvard University. From 1978 to 1984 he was an assistant professor at Columbia University. Beginning in 1984 he has been employed at IBM doing research at the Thomas J. Watson Research Center.

His research deals with interstellar gas with a focus on star formation in gaseous nebulae and large-scale structure of spiral galaxies. Using computer model simulations, he proved the existence of standing waves in spiral galaxies.

Since 1976 he has been married to the astronomer Debra Meloy Elmegreen (born 1952), who is a professor at Vassar College. In 2014, they authored a paper together, "The Onset of Spiral Structure in the Universe", published in the Astrophysical Journal.

== Honors and awards ==
- In 2001 Elmegreen received the Dannie Heineman Prize for Astrophysics.
- In 2020 he was elected a Legacy Fellow of the American Astronomical Society.
- In 2021 he received the Catherine Wolfe Bruce Gold Medal of the Astronomical Society of the Pacific.
- Asteroid 28364 Bruceelmegreen, discovered by astronomers with the LONEOS project in 1999, was named in his honor. The official naming citation was published by IAU's Working Group for Small Bodies Nomenclature on 15 October 2021.
