= Debra Elmegreen =

American astronomer (born 1952)

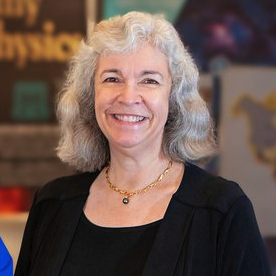
- Elmegreen in October 2018
- Born: November 23, 1952 (age 73); South Bend, Indiana
- Education: Princeton University (AB); Harvard University (MA, PhD)
- Spouse: Bruce Elmegreen
- Scientific career
- Fields: Astronomy
- Workplaces: Kitt Peak Observatory; Arecibo Observatory; Hale Observatory; Vassar College (1985–present)
- Thesis: An Optical Analysis of Dust Complexes in Spiral Galaxies (1979)
- Doctoral advisor: William Liller

Debra Meloy Elmegreen (born November 23, 1952 in South Bend, Indiana) is an American astronomer. She was the first woman to graduate from Princeton University with a degree in astrophysics, and she was the first female post-doctoral researcher at the Carnegie Observatories.

Since 1985, Elmegreen has been a professor of astronomy at Vassar College, currently on the endowed Maria Mitchell Chair. She wrote an astronomy textbook published by Prentice Hall in 1997. She served as president of the American Astronomical Society from 2010 to 2012. On August 30, 2018, she was named President-elect of the International Astronomical Union (IAU) at the group's 30th triennial General Assembly in Vienna, Austria and was IAU President from 2021 to 2024.

== Early life and education ==
Elmegreen was born in South Bend, Indiana in 1952. She became interested in astronomy at a young age. She received her bachelor's degree in astrophysics from the Princeton University in 1975, where she was the first woman to graduate with an astrophysics major. She earned both her Masters and Ph.D. from Harvard University in astronomy. In 1976 she married Bruce Elmegreen, an astronomer.

== Career ==
Elmegreen did post-doctoral research at the Hale Observatory (now Mount Wilson Observatory) beginning in 1979, where she was the first female post-doctoral researcher at any of the Carnegie Observatories. Starting in 1985, she began teaching astronomy at Vassar College. In 1990, she became an associate professor and then department chair in 1993.

Elmegreen is particularly interested in star formation and star forming galaxies. In 1997, Elmegreen published an astronomy textbook for undergraduates titled, Galaxies and Galactic Structure, through Prentice Hall. Elmegreen has also published over 200 academic papers.

She was president of the American Astronomical Society from 2010 to 2012, and was appointed as a board member of the 2010 Astronomy and Astrophysics Decadal Survey through the National Academies of Sciences, Engineering, and Medicine.

In 2013, she and her husband authored a paper, "The Onset of Spiral Structure in the Universe", published in the Astrophysical Journal.

She was the President of the International Astronomical Union, (2021–2024, President-Elect 2018–21; VP 2015–18).

== Recognition ==
She was elected to the American Academy of Arts and Sciences in 2019. In 2018, Elmegreen won the George Van Biesbroeck Prize for her unselfish service to astronomy on regional, national, and international scales.

She was elected a Legacy Fellow of the American Astronomical Society in 2020

She was elected a Fellow of the American Association for the Advancement of Science in 2011

== Works ==
- Galaxies and Galactic Structure, Prentice Hall, 1997, ISBN 0137792328

Elmegreen has also published over 200 academic papers including:

- Elmegreen, D. M., S4 G team, 2011, “Grand Design and Flocculent Spirals in the Spitzer Survey of Stellar Structure in Galaxies,” Astrophysical Journal, 737, 32
- Elmegreen, D.M., et al. 2009, “Clumpy Galaxies in GEMS and GOODS: Massive Analogs of Local Dwarf Irregulars,” Astrophysical Journal, 701, 306
- Elmegreen, D., et al. 2007, “Resolved Galaxies in the Hubble Ultra Deep Field: Star Formation in Disks at High Redshift,” Astrophysical Journal, 658, 763
