= Sona Hosseini =

Iranian-American planetary scientist

S. Sona Hosseini
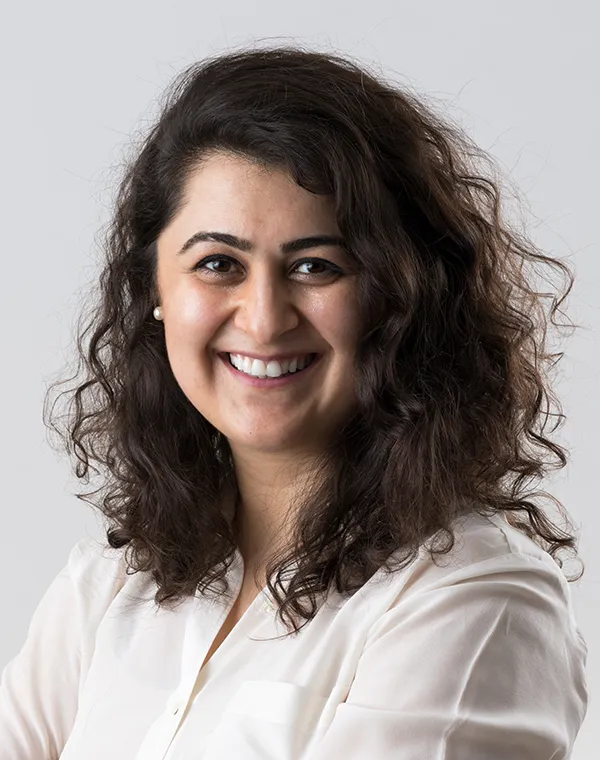
- Hosseini official portrait, 2024
- Born: Seyedeh Sona Hosseini; 1982 (age 43–44)
- Education: University of Isfahan; University of Zanjan; University of California, Davis
- Scientific career
- Institutions: Jet Propulsion Laboratory
- Thesis: Tunable all reflective spatial heterodyne spectroscopy, a technique for high resolving power observation ol defused emission line sources (2013)

Seyedeh Sona Hosseini (born 1982) is an Iranian-American planetary scientist and researcher at the Jet Propulsion Laboratory. She develops lightweight, compact and highly sensitive spectrometers for space missions.

== Early life and education ==
Hosseini grew up in Iran, and moved to San Antonio at the age of 2. She became interested in astronomy during a school trip to Johnson Space Center at the age of 7. At the age of 11, she moved back to Iran, where her parents encouraged her to explore astronomy through the Institute for Advanced Studies in Basic Sciences. She built her first telescope in junior high school, and started building cameras and spectrometers during college. She made astrophysical observations of dark skies in Iran using her own equipment, which formed the basis of her undergraduate research.

Hosseini studied physics at the University of Isfahan, where she was involved in building a 16-inch telescope and dome for the physics department's observatory. She moved to the University of Zanjan for her graduate research, where she specialized in physics and astronomy. Her graduate research involved working with New Mexico Institute of Mining and Technology on astrophysical observations from candidate sites for the Iran National Observatory. She moved to the University of California, Davis as a graduate student in engineering science. Her doctorate developed tunable, all reflective spatial heterodyne spectroscopy, a spectroscopic approach that combines dispersive and interferometric techniques. Her PhD included the mathematical framework and experimental protocol for constructing a spatial heterodyne spectrometer. She developed a visible spatial heterodyne spectrometer for detecting Sodium D-lines. A minor planet (28912 Sonahosseini), discovered in 2000, was named after her.

== Research and career ==
In 2015, Hosseini joined the Jet Propulsion Laboratory, where she has studied low-density gas environments (e.g. exospheres, cometary tails). At JPL, she leads the development of next generation, miniaturized, high resolution spectrometers. In 2022, she was supported by the Nancy Grace Roman fellowship to work on far UV science investigations.

== Awards and honors ==
- 2014 University of California, Los Angeles Young Scholar Award
- 2020 SPIE Early Career Achievement Award
- 2022 NASA Nancy Grace Roman Technology Fellowship
- 2025 Fellow of SPIE
