= Churches of Busto Arsizio =

Churches of Busto Arsizio, Italy

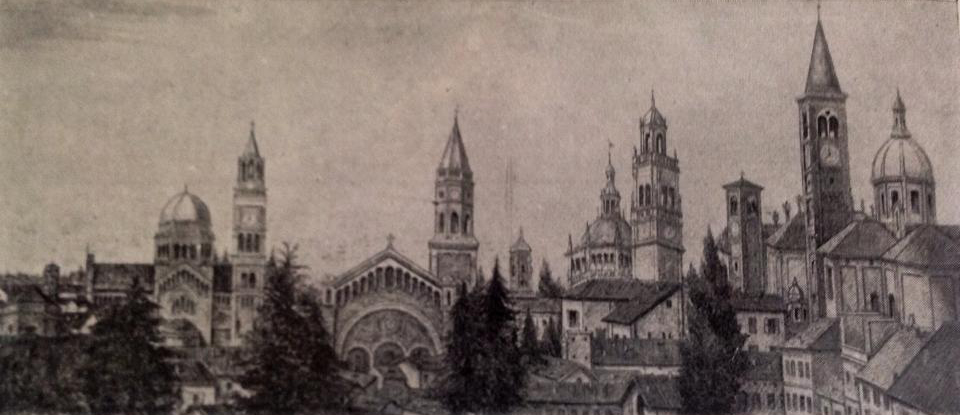
An overview of Busto Arsizio's main churches in a 1930s postcard

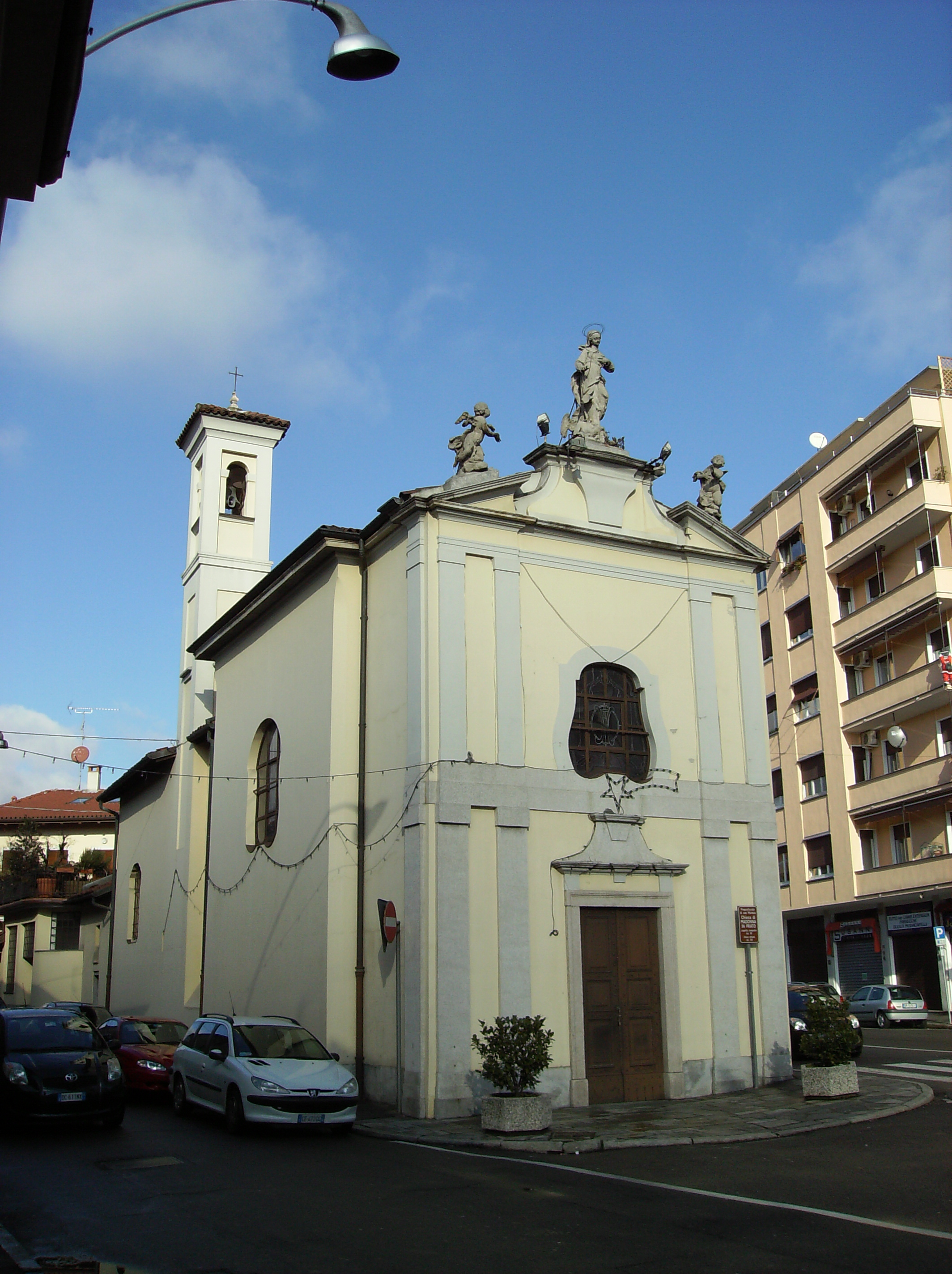
Church of Madonna in Prato

There are currently twenty-five churches in Busto Arsizio, including parish and auxiliary churches and a baptistery.

Some of these churches, notably St. Mary of Piazza, St. John the Baptist, and St. Michael the Archangel, were built before the year one thousand. In the communal period the first rectories, later called parishes, were established. They involved the presence of a priest to whom the care of souls was entrusted and who generally resided at a pre-existing church. Busto Arsizio was subject to the parish of Olgiate Olona, but the community, on the basis of its growing economic resources, formed five "curate benefices" between the 13th and 16th centuries: three at the church of St. John the Baptist and two at the church of St. Michael the Archangel, while the church of St. Mary, located in the central square of the village, was configured as a sanctuary, without parish duties.

St. Charles Borromeo in 1583 transferred the ecclesiastical dignities of the parish (i.e., district) to Busto Arsizio, and the curates of St. John and St. Michael were elevated to the rank of canons, as coadjutors of the provost in the care of souls (Busto Arsizio was therefore formally considered a single parish).

In the seventeenth century a new religious fervor led to the construction of new churches, such as St. Gregory in Camposanto (1632), Madonna in Veroncora (1639) and St. Bernardino (1665), as well as the rebuilding of the churches of St. John the Baptist (1609) and St. Michael the Archangel (1652). The eighteenth century saw the construction of Madonna in Campagna (1702), San Rocco (1706), the old church of Sacconago (1708), the church of St. Anne (1710, later the Civic Temple), and the church of St. Anthony of Padua (1717, in the territory of Borsano).

Busto remained de facto a single parish until 1906, when San Michele was also given that function. Later, in 1928, Borsano and Sacconago were annexed to the municipality, bringing the number of parishes to four. Over the course of the twentieth century the other parishes were then formed until the present number of thirteen was reached. This was the century in which the most churches were built (as many as eleven, to which can be added that of the Friars Minor, which actually was built beginning in 1898, but finished during that century).

Throughout history, many churches have been demolished to be later rebuilt with greater capacity. Other churches, however, were demolished permanently: these include the church of Santa Croce, dating back to 1564 and formerly the seat of the confraternity of the Disciplini, which was deconsecrated in 1948 and demolished in 1972; the Borsano church of Santa Maria dei Restagni; the Sacconago church of San Donato; that of St. Eurosia in Cascina Brughetto (built in the years 1719-1722, dedicated to the young martyr of Jaca and demolished in 1952); the chapel of St. Ambrose in Canton Santo, not far from the church of Santa Maria di Piazza.

In the case of Sacconago, the construction of the new church (1928) did not involve the demolition of the 18th-century church since land belonging to the old cemetery was used for this purpose.

The other churches currently existing in the territory of Busto Arsizio are described below: first, the Shrine of St. Mary, which constitutes the most important church in the city; second, the thirteen that are parish seats; third, the eleven that constitute subsidiary churches; and finally, the baptistery.

The parish churches were all built in the twentieth century, with the exception of the Basilica of St. John, the Provostal Church of St. Michael and Church of the Friars Minor, which was begun in 1898. These are very often places of worship built in areas of expansion of the city, or at other times modern and more spacious churches that take the place of older ones, as in the cases of the new parish churches of Sacconago and Borsano, both dedicated to the holy apostles Peter and Paul. The subsidiary churches, on the other hand, are all older: the only exception is St. Charles Borromeo, one of the three subsidiary churches of the provostry of St. Michael the Archangel. That building represents the last Catholic Christian place of worship built in the city. It was in fact consecrated in September 2000 by Cardinal Carlo Maria Martini, then archbishop of Milan.

== Shrine of Santa Maria di Piazza ==
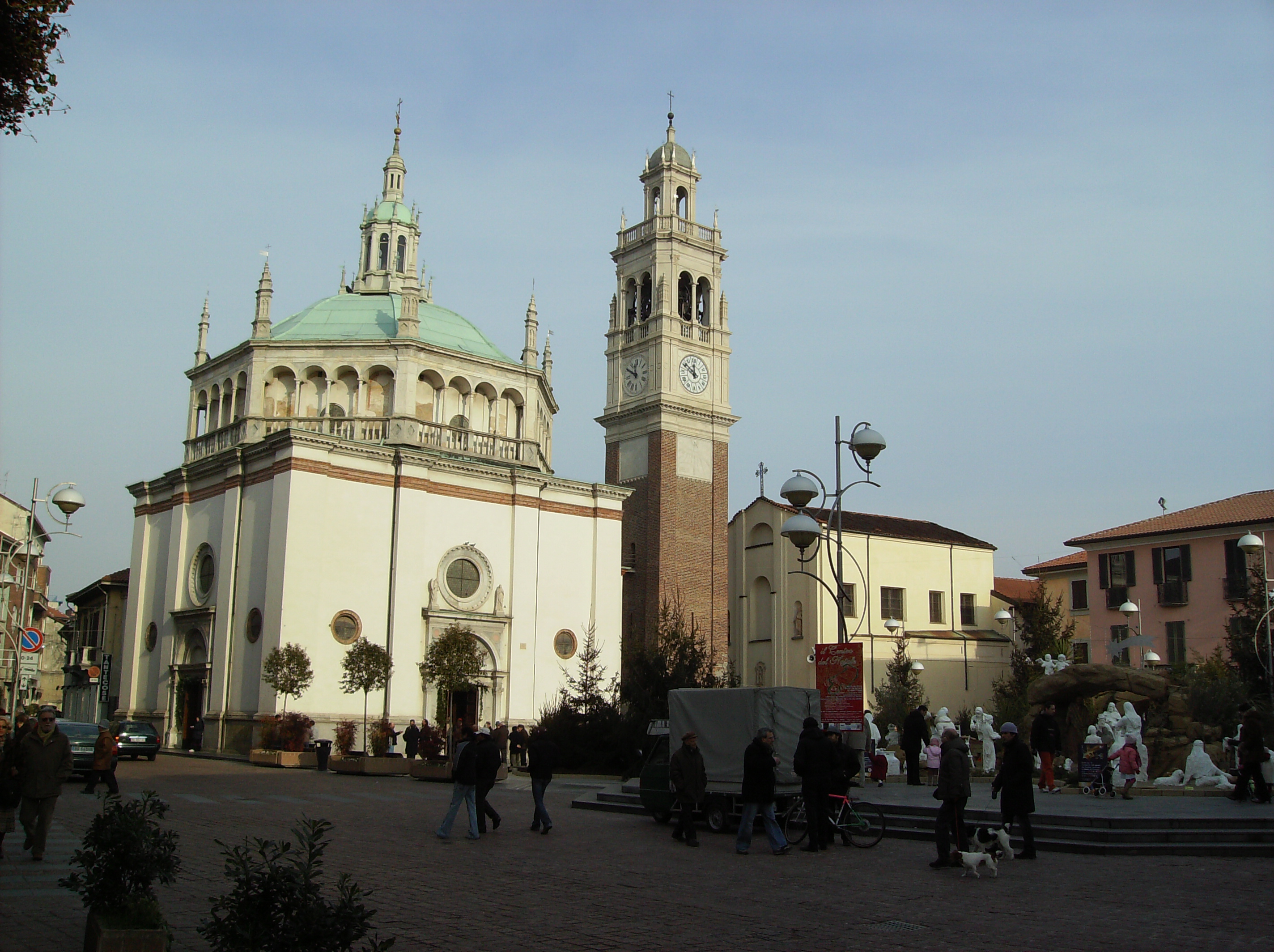
Shrine of Santa Maria di Piazza

Erected in the city's historic center on a pre-existing church dedicated to the Virgin Mary, which in turn had replaced a chapel dating back to the time of Christianization, the sanctuary of Santa Maria di Piazza (also known as the Sanctuary of the Blessed Virgin of Help) is an example of Renaissance architecture.

It was built in a few years between 1515 and 1522 under the guidance of Antonio da Lonate, who is said to have set the central plan, and "magistro Tomaxio ingeniero," probably Tommaso Rodari, author of the west and south portals, and perhaps of the loggia in the drum under the dome.

The central plan of the building, for which a Bramantesque design has been hypothesized, consists of a rigorous cubic volume punctuated by pilasters and surmounted by an octagonal tiburium with spires and a lantern that interprets in lighter forms the typology of the Lombard tradition.

Internally the lower square part is cut in the corners forming diagonal arches. niches and pendentives, harks back to Leonardo's studies of centrally planned churches, while the drum with archivolt niches (the crown of the twelve saints) echoes the examples of Santa Maria Incoronata di Canepanova in Pavia, Incoronata in Lodi, and the basilica of Santa Maria della Croce in Crema).

The interior decoration includes works of sculpture and paintings by Gaudenzio Ferrari (including the Last Supper, in the right altar) and Giovan Battista della Cerva and a copy of the lost Madonna delle Vittorie by Giovan Paolo Lomazzo.

An exact copy of the shrine, in reduced size, was built in the late 19th century in Crespi d'Adda.

== Basilica of St. John the Baptist ==
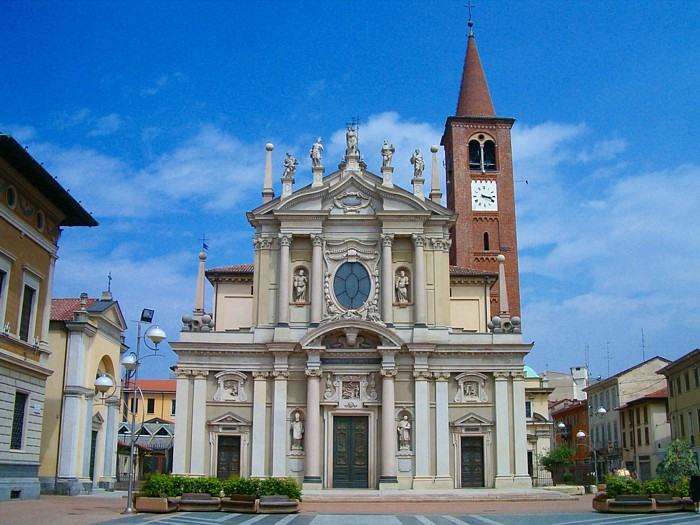
Basilica of St. John the Baptist

The Basilica of San Giovanni Battista (one of the two patron saints of the city, along with St. Michael the Archangel) has the title of minor Roman basilica.

The present building was built between 1609 and 1635 on the site of a primitive three-aisled chapel dedicated by the Lombards to one of their patron saints. The bell tower was built between 1400 and 1418, so it appears to be older than the present church.

The facade, completed between 1699 and 1701 by Domenico Valmagini, features a lower order of Ionic double pilasters, a short prothyrum with arched pediment, copper and bronze doors, statues and bas-reliefs.

The interior, designed by architect Francesco Maria Richini, has several paintings by Busto painter Daniele Crespi, including Dead Christ with St. Dominic.

On the right side of the church is the "mortuary," a small temple whose author is unknown, built between 1689 and 1692. On the left side is a statue of Blessed Giuliana Puricelli from Busto.

The square in front of the church was created by demolishing some pre-existing buildings and using the area of the old cemetery, predating the one that was later built just outside the village, in what is now Ugo Foscolo Park. Two other fine buildings overlook the same square: the recently restored Volonterio palace and the Varese credit.

== Provostal Church of St. Michael Archangel ==
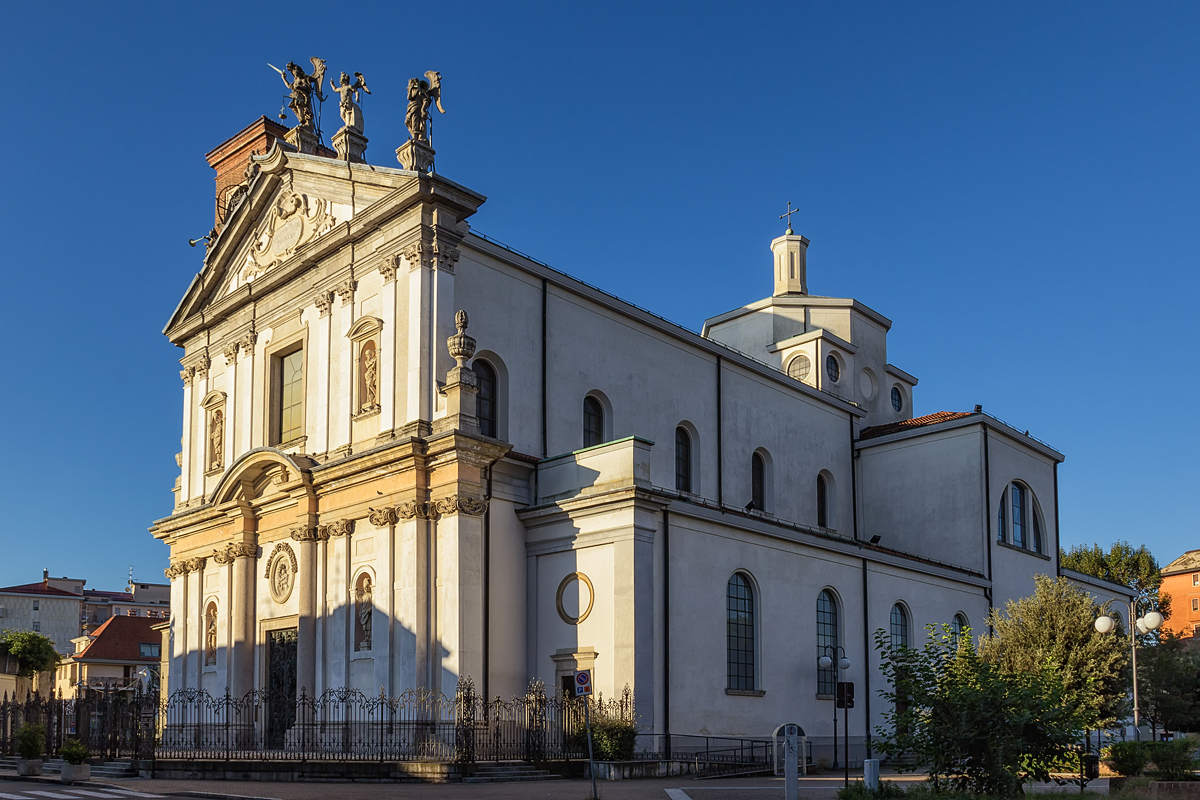
Provostal Church of St. Michael Archangel

One of the city's main churches is that of San Michele Arcangelo, the city's patron saint, which is also the seat of the provostry. With its bell tower dating back to the 10th century, which constitutes the oldest architectural element of the town, it is located on the northern edge of the ancient village, in an area slightly higher than the rest of the settlement existing at that time. For this reason, it is very likely that the base of the bell tower itself was one of the towers of a pre-existing fortification, within which there was probably a chapel dedicated to the saint (St. Michael the Archangel is the patron saint of the Lombards).

The first mention of the church of St. Michael dates from around 1300. Between 1652 and 1679 it was rebuilt by architect Francesco Maria Ricchino, who decided to reverse its orientation. In 1796 the facade was completed and restored between 1924 and 1925. The side walls and vault were restored in 1834. Due to the project initiated by the then provost Don Luigi Brambillasca and funding from the province of Varese chaired by Marco Reguzzoni, in 2004 the church of San Michele saw a profound restoration of the load-bearing structures, some works of art and the exterior facade. In 2007, restoration work began on the bell tower, which was completed the following year.

Various relics are kept in the church, including the entire body of the martyr St. Felix. In the winter chapel, built in 1991, is a wooden crucifix from the mid-14th century, which is used in the Good Friday service to commemorate Jesus' passion and death on the cross.

== Church of St. Edward ==
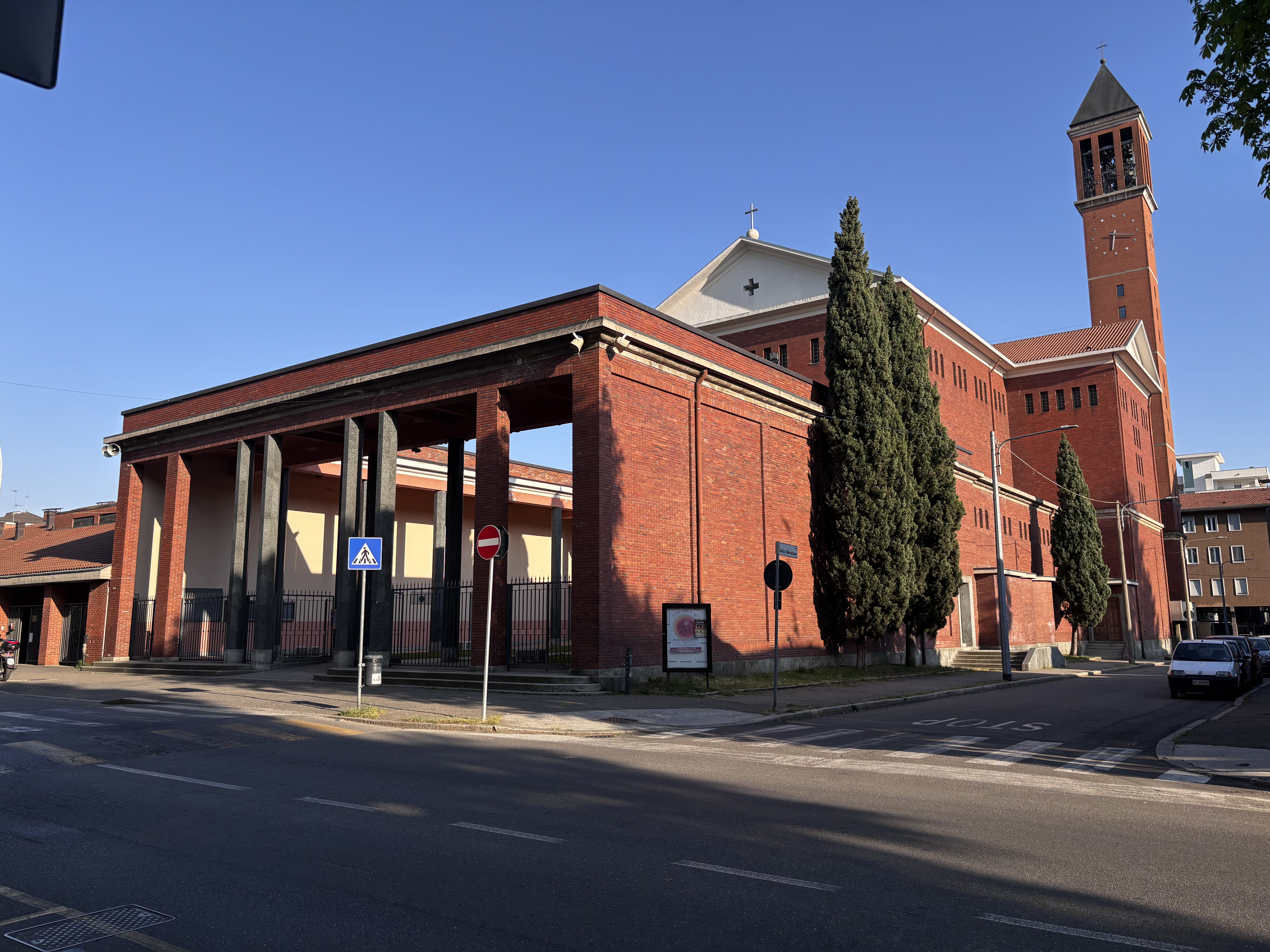
The Church of Saint Edward

The foundation stone was laid on June 24, 1938, and the temple was consecrated on October 12 of the following year by Cardinal Ildefonso Schuster. Designed by two architect priests, Giuseppe Polvara and Giacomo Bettoli, the church was frescoed by Ernesto Bergagna between 1943 and 1947, the year it was made a parish church. The organ belonged to the church of Santa Maria di Piazza It has a single nave with light-colored walls and coffered ceiling and its interior contains paintings depicting seventeenth-century passion scenes from the demolished church of Santa Croce. The exterior is covered with exposed brick.

The church was consecrated in honor of the Holy Three Kings (Magi) and St. Edward the Confessor in memory of the main donor for the construction of the temple, knight of labor Edoardo Gabardi.

Despite the fact that its construction was largely financed by a Fascist, this parish played a key role during the Italian Resistance. In Busto Arsizio, as in the whole of the Altomilanese, the main promoter of the Resistance was not the Italian Communist Party, as it was in the rest of northern Italy. Here it was the formations linked to the future Christian Democracy, supported by the parishes, that carried out the clandestine activities. In particular, the warehouse of the parish of S. Edoardo was transformed into a warehouse of materials, and it was from here that, on the morning of 25 April 1945 at 6.30 a.m., the parish priest Don Ambrogio Gianotti sent out the order for the insurrection that would lead to the liberation of northern Italy.

== Church of San Luigi and Blessed Giuliana ==
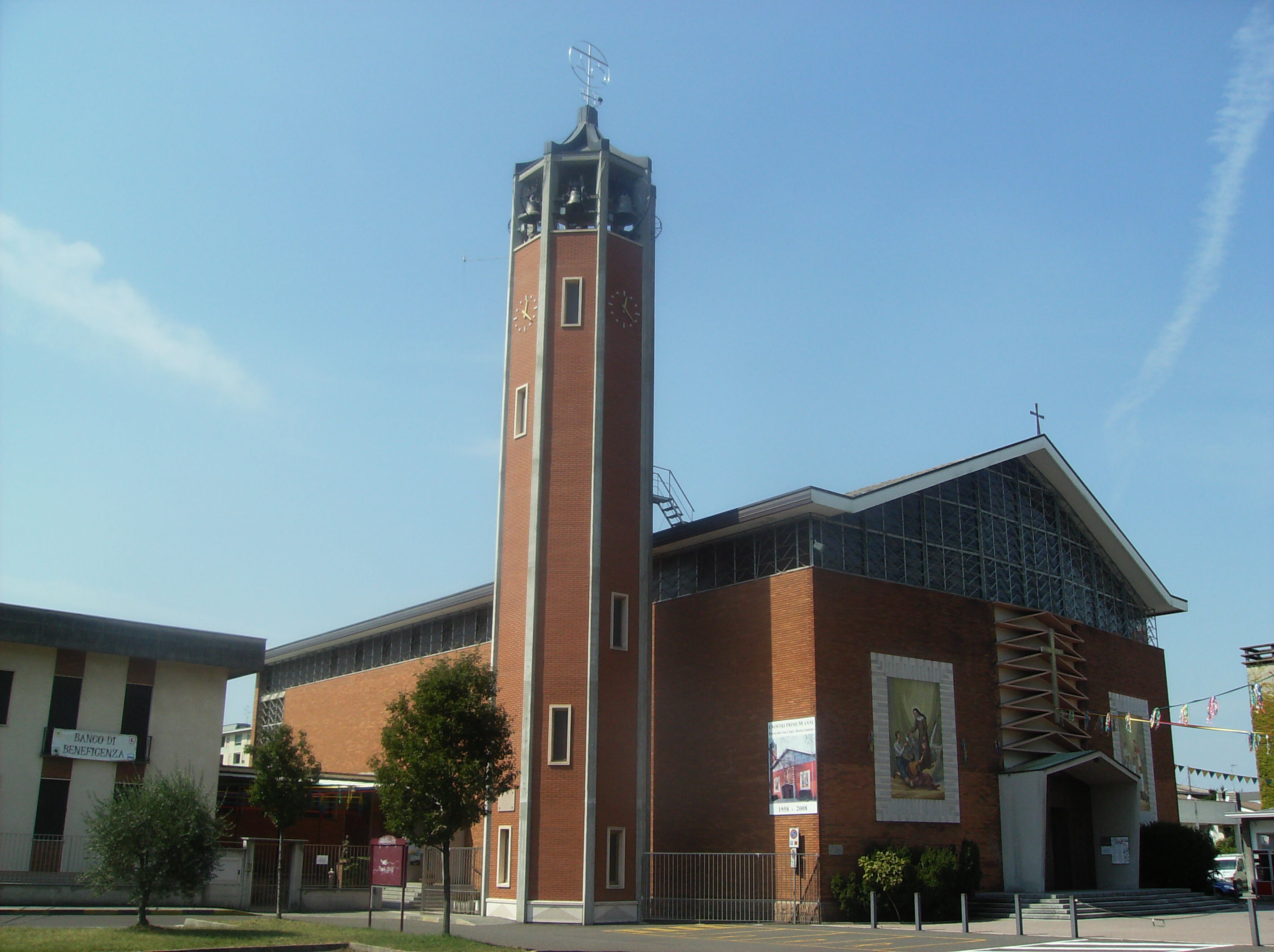
Church of San Luigi and Blessed Giuliana

Erected in the early 1950s at the behest of the provost of St. Michael the Archangel Fr. Luigi Scola, it stands in the new neighborhood named after Blessed Giuliana Puricelli. It was opened for worship on Sept. 15, 1957, and became a parish church the following year. The church has a rectangular plan and was built of reinforced concrete. Erected in an area that was predominantly agricultural at the time, it is dedicated to the Blessed of Busto, who was born in the nearby Cascina dei Poveri and to the Jesuit saint Aloysius Gonzaga, protector of students.

The exterior of the church has exposed brick walls, a gabled façade and a concrete portal surmounted by a glazed triangular tympanum. On the façade are depictions of the two saints. The one of Blessed Giuliana is a mosaic by Torildo Conconi, who in 1984 reproduced a painting by Biagio Bellotti preserved in the Museum of Sacred Art of St. Michael the Archangel and dating from 1782.

The bell tower has an octagonal plan and is located next to the southeast side of the building.

The hall presents a single nave. Among the most important works inside the church is a 17th-century painting of Blessed Giuliana, later repainted.

The celebration organized for the fiftieth anniversary of the church's elevation to parish status was also attended by the then Archbishop of Milan, Cardinal Dionigi Tettamanzi.

== Church of the Most Holy Redeemer ==
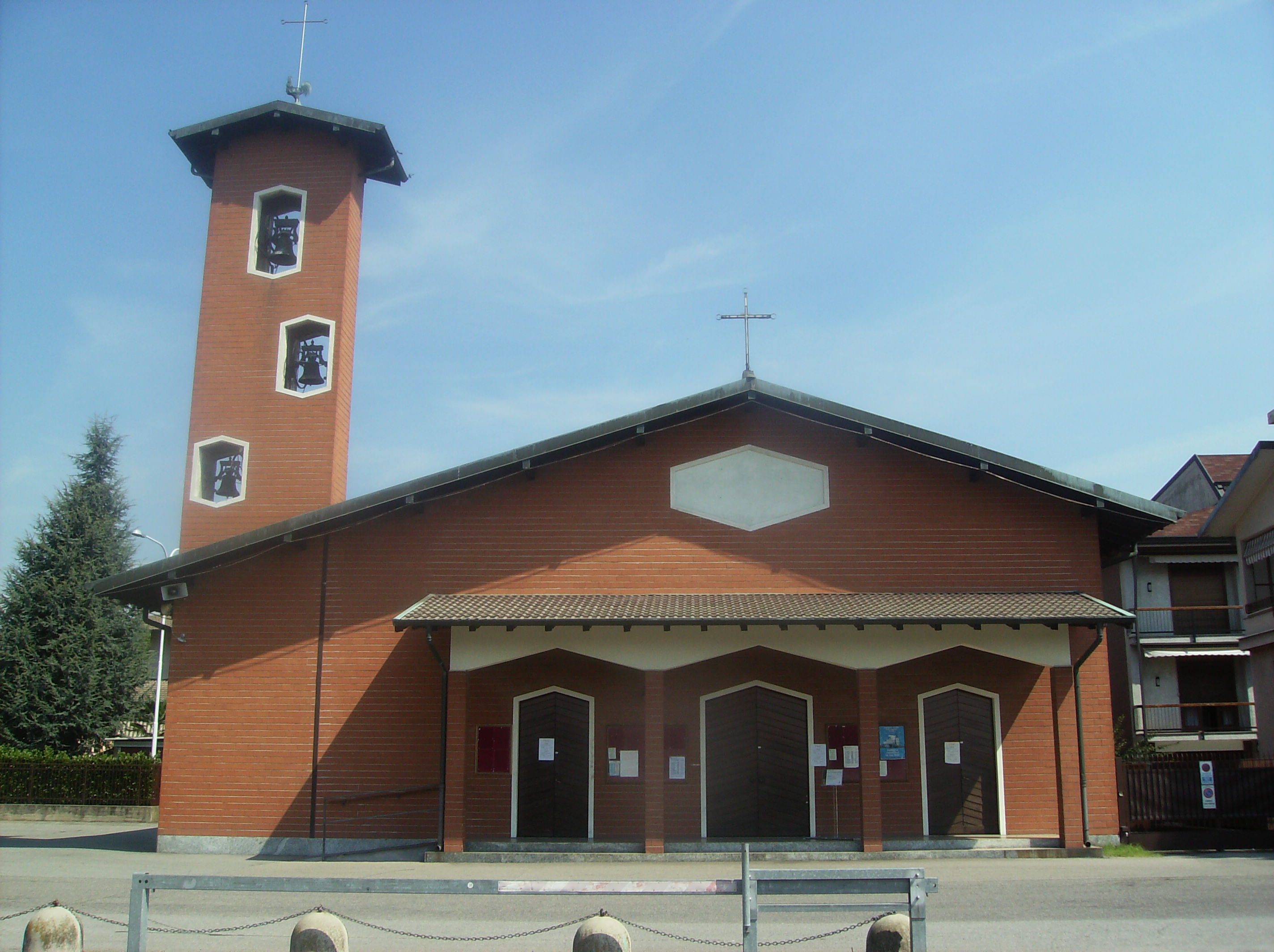
Church of the Most Holy Redeemer

The temple was built to a design by Antonio Garavaglia in the territory that lay between that of the young parish of Beata Giuliana and what five years later would become the territory of the parish of Madonna Regina. The church was consecrated in 1962 and remained subsidiary to the parish of St. Michael the Archangel until 1973.

From that year onward it assumed that role itself in order to cope with the large population increase in the neighborhood that had sprung up around the church in the meantime. Today about 7400 people live in the parish territory.

In 1976, through the work of architect and priest Fr. Gaetano Banfi, the side aisle with hexagonal windows, the pronaos and the bell gable, which has a rectangular plan and three hexagonal openings designed for the purpose of each accommodating one of the three bells, were added. The marble altar and stained glass windows with depictions of the Trinity, the Theological Virtues, the Cardinal Virtues, Suffering and Glory were also added.

On the afternoon of April 16, 2010, during a violent thunderstorm, lightning struck the church's bell tower, causing some concrete blocks to fall.

== Church of St. Joseph ==
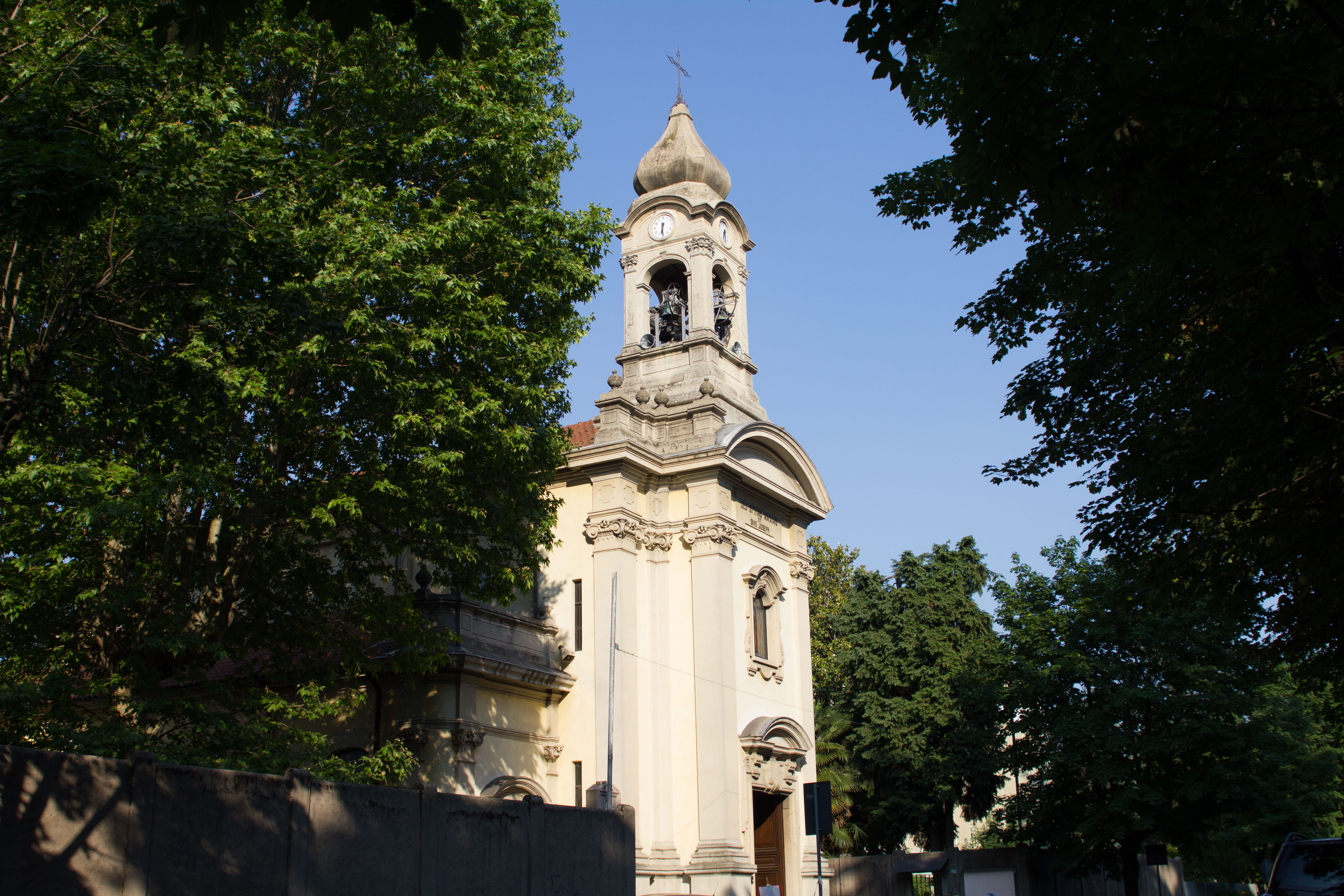
Church of St. Joseph

Built to a design by architect Camillo Crespi Balbi between 1912 and 1914 as the chapel of the Busto Arsizio hospital, it was dedicated to St. Joseph, the husband of Mary, the putative father of Jesus and the patron saint of workers. The church that existed in the old hospital building in Palazzo Gilardoni, now the town hall, was also dedicated to him. It was consecrated in 1915 as a hospital chapel open to the public.

The bell tower does not rest on the ground but rises from the center of the tripartite façade. Originally the façade was made of exposed brick: its present appearance dates from 1933. Inside it has three naves and a square chancel. Some 18th-century paintings are also preserved there.

With the 1988 renovation, the two side altars dedicated to the Sacred Heart and Our Lady of Caravaggio were removed, making more space for the faithful. In fact, the church, formerly the auxiliary of St. John the Baptist, became a parish in 1990. Further restoration work on the exterior of the church was carried out in 1997. Cardinal Angelo Scola in 2015 presided at Holy Mass there on the occasion of the 25th anniversary of its erection as a parish.

== Shrine of the Sacred Heart of Jesus (or of the Friars Minor) ==
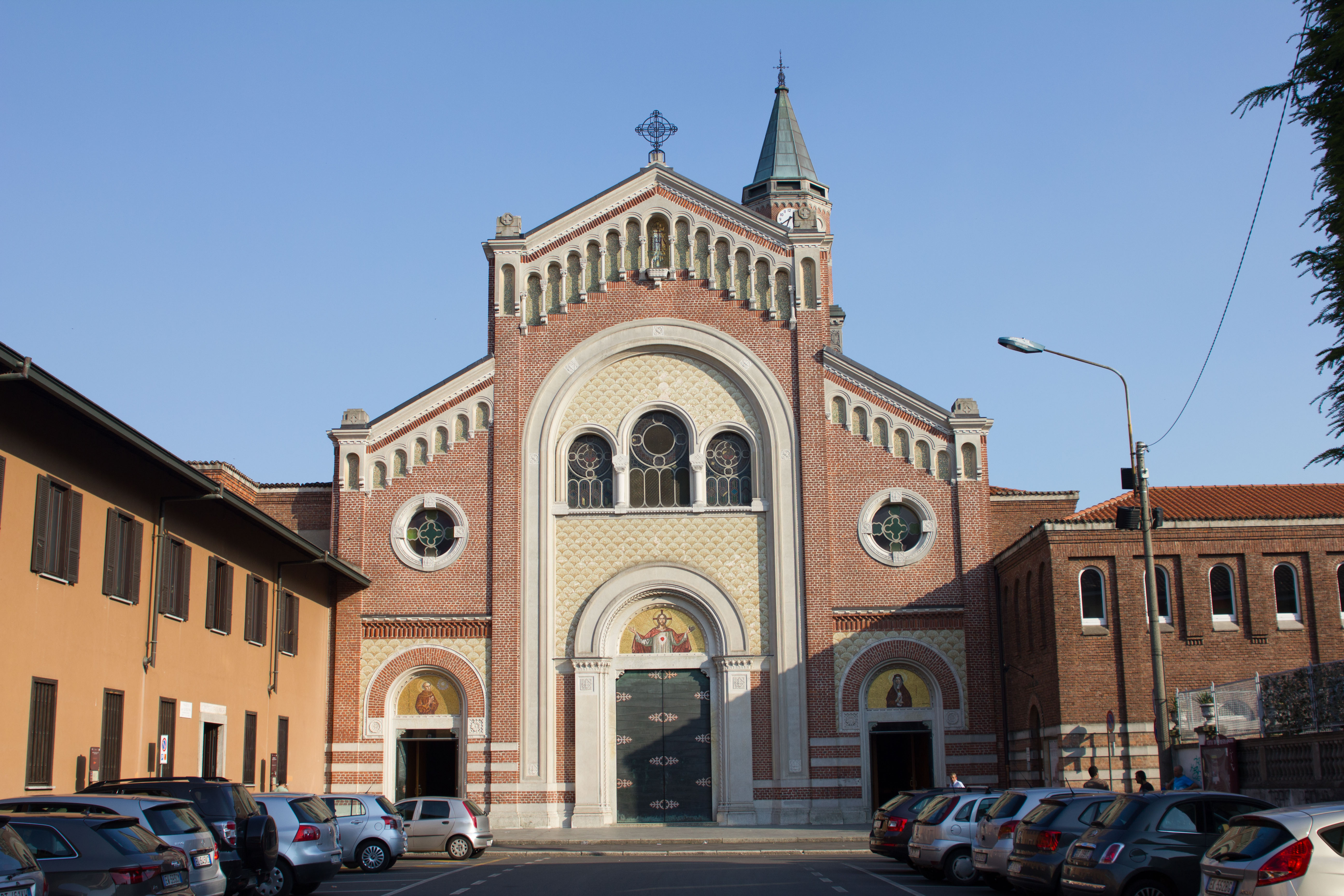
Shrine of the Sacred Heart of Jesus

Started in 1898 (the year the foundation stone was laid) based on a design by engineer Luigi Cesa Bianchi, it stood on an area purchased two years earlier from the Bottigelli brothers. At first a chapel (the present sacristy) was built, and beginning in 1906, work continued on the project by engineer Luigi Carlo Cornelli. Bustocco born Cardinal Eugenio Tosi, then bishop of Squillace, blessed the church, bell tower and consecrated the high altar on June 23, 1911. Architect Silvio Gambini designed the interior ornamentation and facade, which were executed between 1919 and 1920.

After another pause in work due to World War I, the shrine was consecrated by Monsignor Lodovico Antomelli on April 30, 1921, and became the parish seat in 1983.

The eclectic-style sanctuary has three naves. The interior was frescoed by Alessandro Pandolfi with scenes from the life of St. Francis of Assisi. The high altar with the white staircase behind is the work of Busto architect Richino Castiglioni, who also designed the back wall and the Blessed Sacrament chapel.

== Church of Santa Maria Regina (or of the Madonna Regina) ==
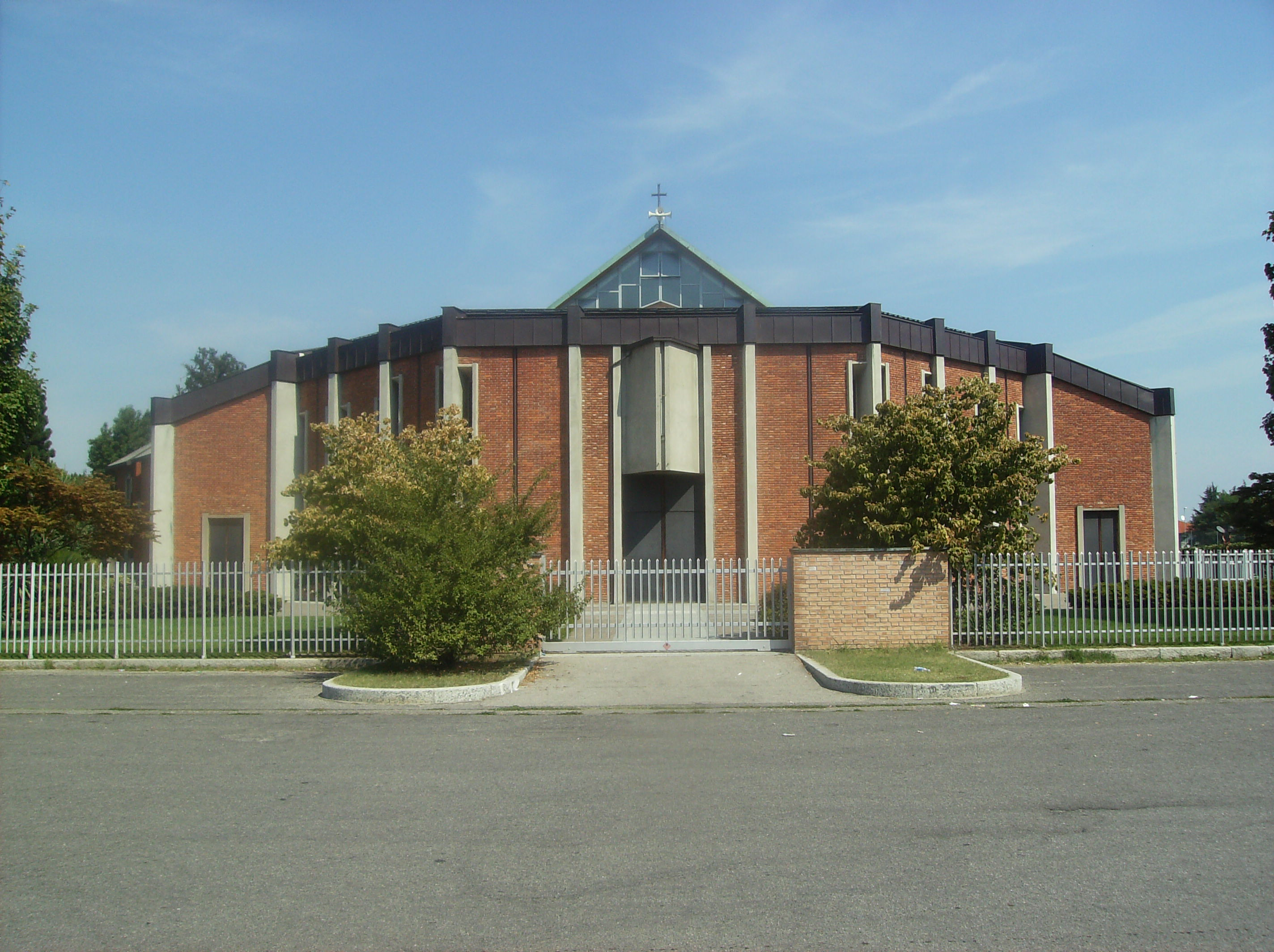
Church of Madonna Regina

This place of worship was built beginning in 1961 at the behest of the then provost of St. Michael the Archangel Fr. Piero Pini and named after the Queen of Heaven. The project was drawn up by Carlo Bortoli, Anna Sarian and Antonio Garavaglia. The church was built along Favana Street, on an area that was still sparsely urbanized and located in the western part of Busto Arsizio, beyond the monumental cemetery. In the neighboring areas, until a few decades before the church was built, there were only a few farmsteads.

The building has an octagonal plan and rests on reinforced concrete pillars. The exterior is made of exposed brick. The shape of the church resembles that of a tent.

The church was consecrated in the presence of Cardinal Giovanni Colombo on June 24, 1964, and became a parish three years later, on May 31, 1967. The first parish priest was Don Marco Brivio, to whom the square in front of the church, recently redeveloped and partially pedestrianized, and the parish counseling center were dedicated.

Today about 5,000 people live in the territory of the parish.

== Church of Santa Croce di Brughetto ==
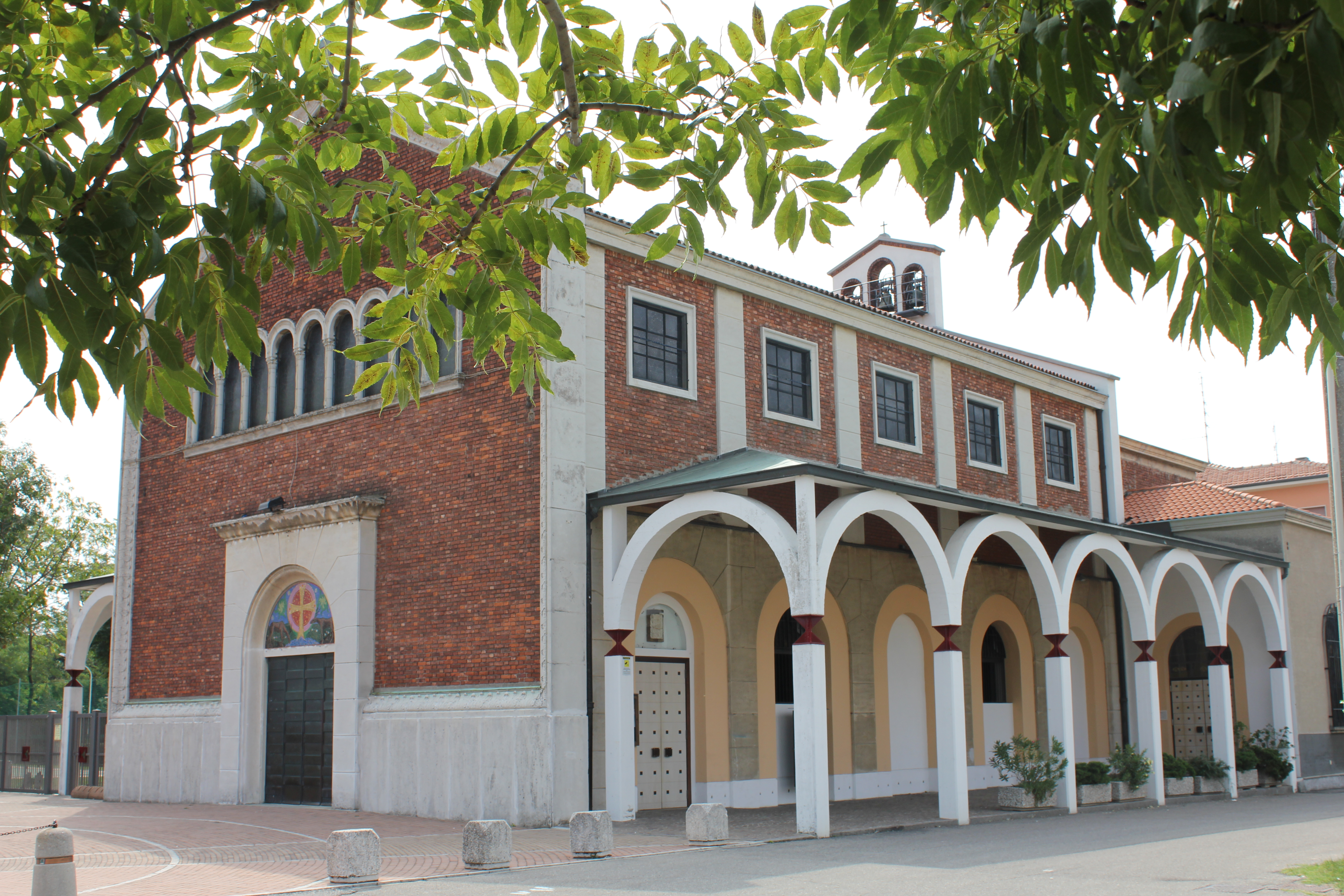
Church of Santa Croce

The church was built in the southern part of what was the territory of St. Edward's, a Busto district that developed after World War II. It was opened for worship in 1951, a year before the nearby church of St. Eurosia was demolished. It became the thirteenth and last parish in Busto Arsizio in 1991, one year after St. Joseph.

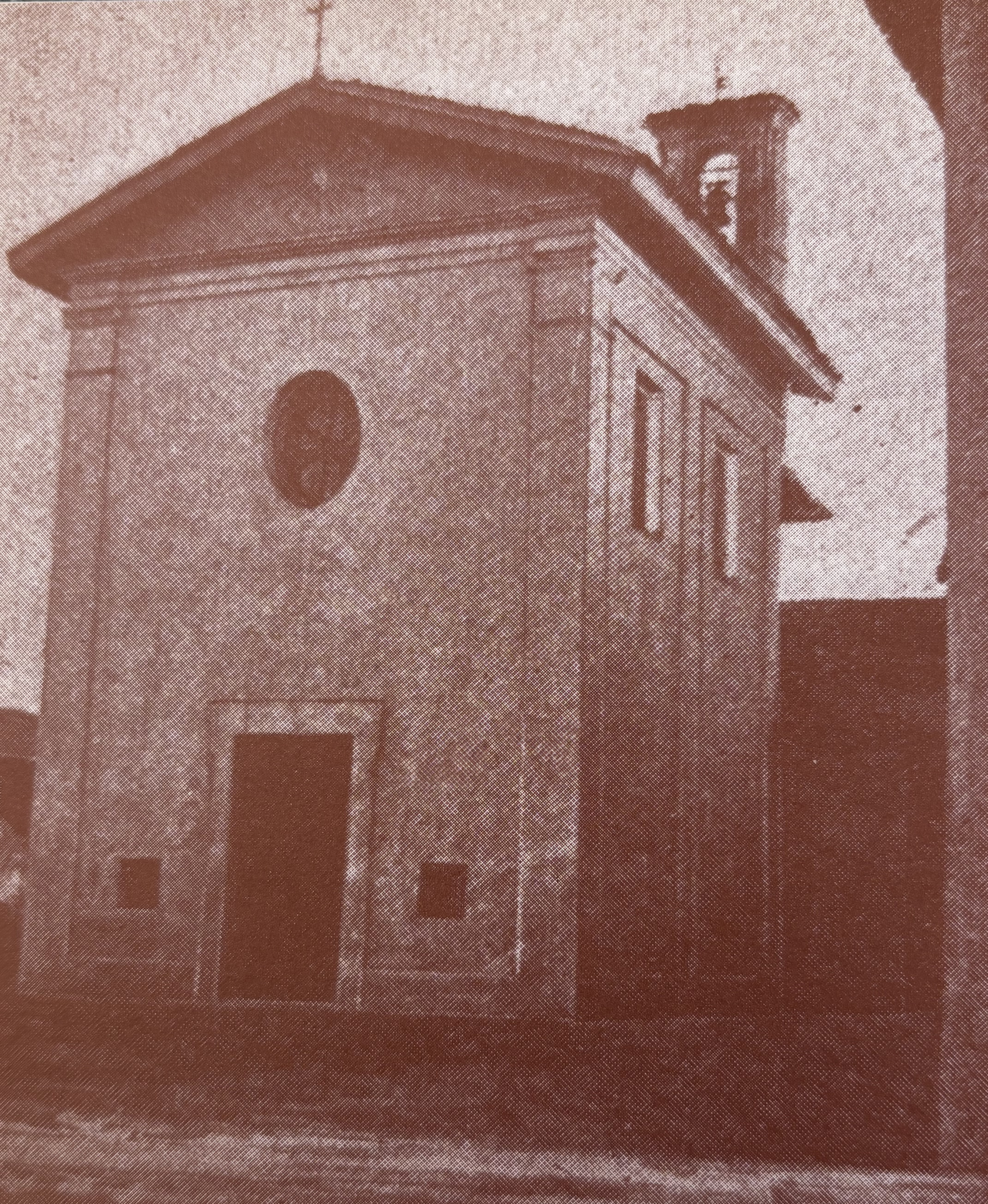
The old Church of Saint Eurosia

It is located in the vicinity of Cascina Brughetto and takes the name of a 16th-century church located in the center of Busto Arsizio, along the street of the same name, in the area that the basilica of St. John the Baptist and the church of St. Anthony Abbot are located. The old church was deconsecrated in 1948 and demolished in 1972.

The stained glass windows, Stations of the Cross, crucifix, and altar of the new church were completed between 1952 and 1975, while it was not until 1982 that the side porches, which were already present in the original design, were built. The building has no bell tower and therefore the bell is placed inside an archway that rises above the chancel.

== Church of the Holy Apostles Peter and Paul of Borsano ==
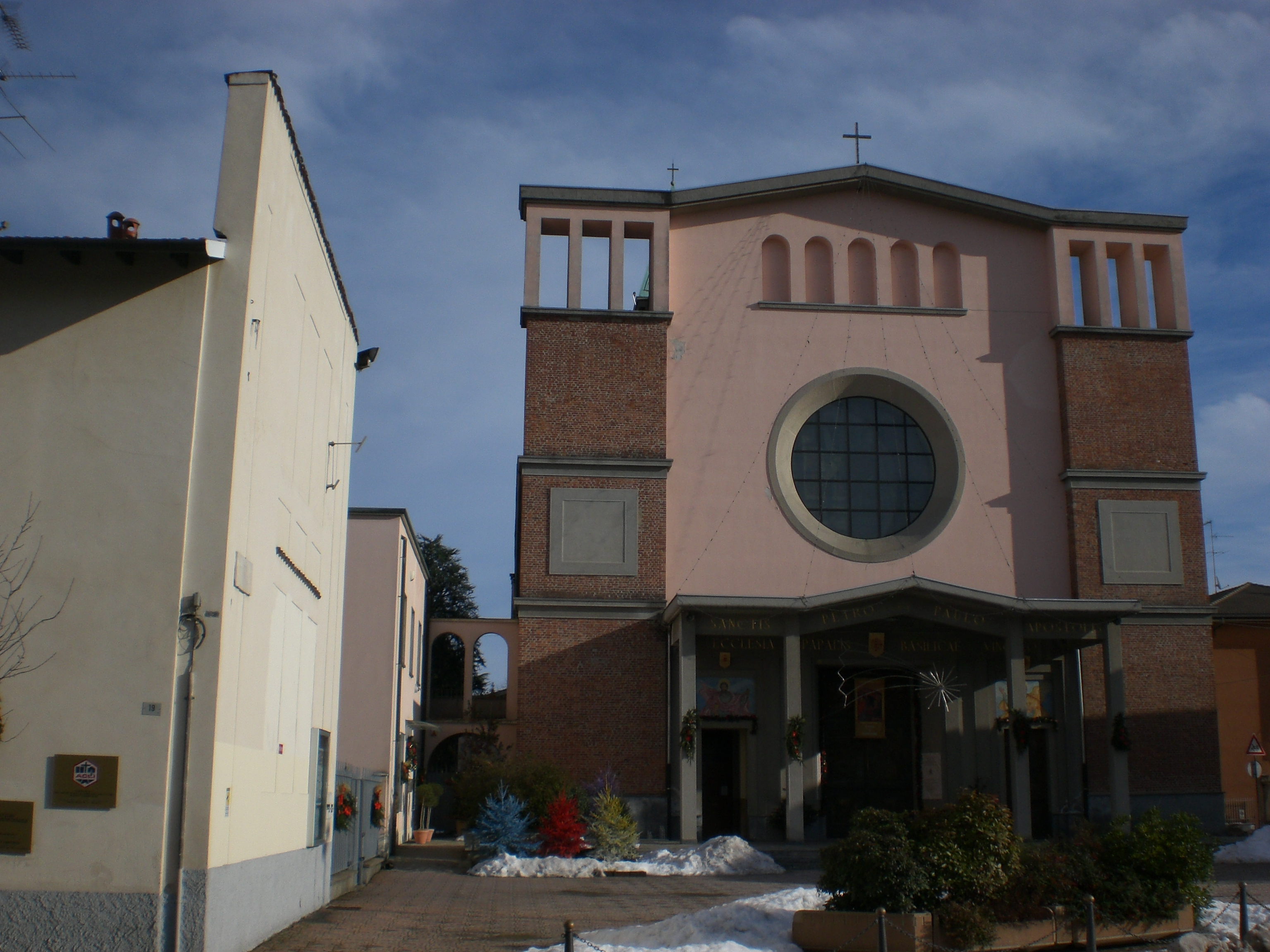
Parish Church of Borsano

The parish church of Borsano is located in Don Antonio Gallarini Square and was built beginning in 1939 on land adjacent to where the 19th-century building, blessed in 1825 and demolished in 1943, stood. The latter, replaced the old 16th-century church, demolished in 1817. The new church was consecrated on October 17, 1942, by Cardinal Ildefonso Schuster, at the height of World War II.

It was designed by engineer Garavaglia and architect Ascani. The tripartite facade heralds the three interior naves. The main altar is the work of architect Ascani. The organ, from the demolished 19th-century church, was built by Antonio De Simoni Carrera in 1885 and restored in 1992 by the V. Mascioni family of Cuvio.

The Stations of the Cross and the counter-façade, dated 1987 and 1993 respectively, are works by local artist Serena Moroni. The new stained glass windows in the nave are by Don Gaetano Banfi, while those in the chancel and the façade rose window are by Paolo Rivetta.

The three bronze portals are the work of sculptor Alberto Ceppi, who also created the mosaics on the facade and the mosaics in the apse.

The imposing square bell tower at the rear of the church was erected in 1958 to a design by architect Ascani to replace that of the 19th-century church, which was demolished only in 1953. It has nine bells; this is the Ambrosian record for a manual concert.

== Church of the Holy Apostles Peter and Paul (or of the Holy Apostles) ==
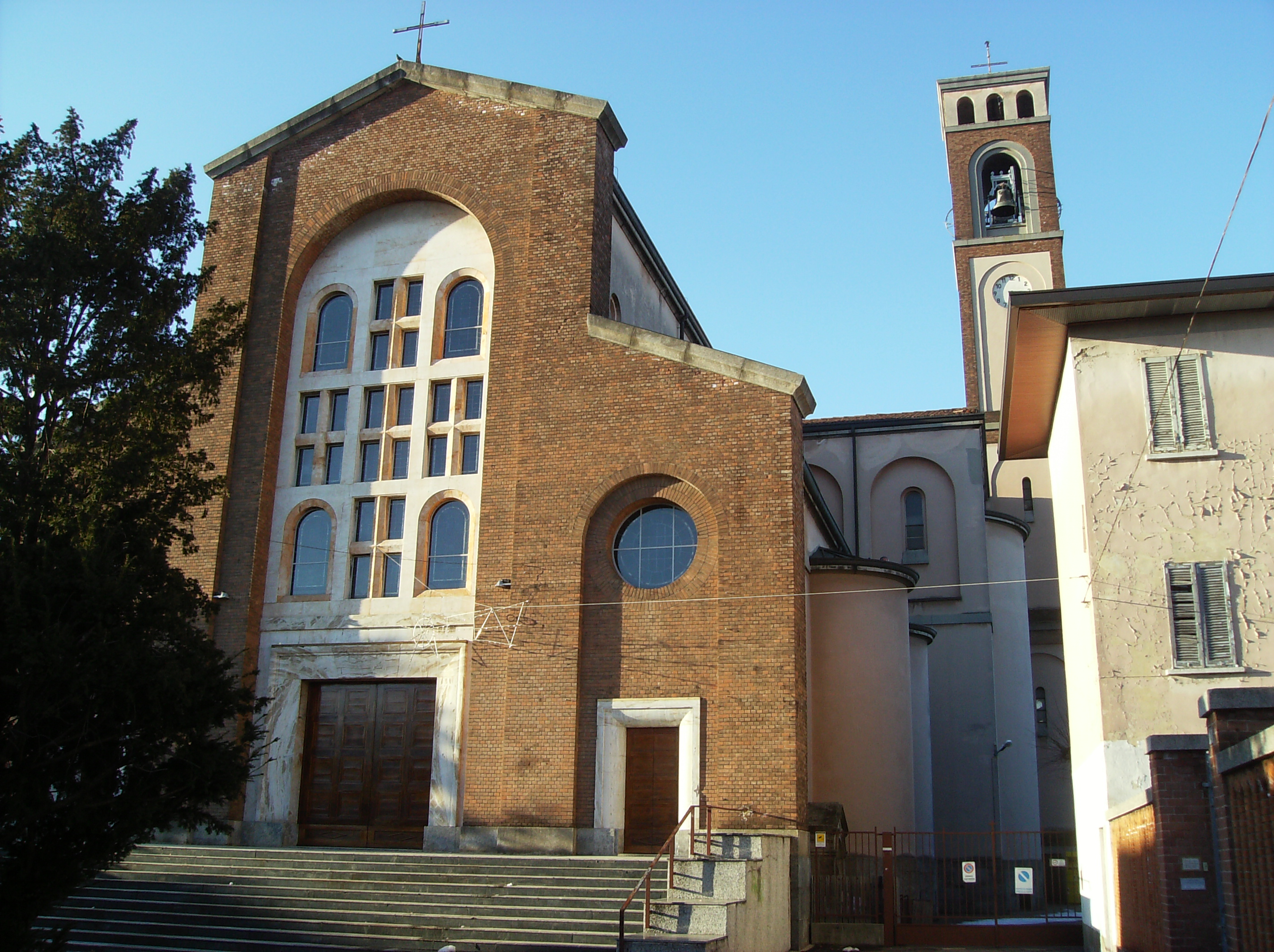
Church of the Holy Apostles

It was built on the land on Via Genova donated by Andrea Tosi starting in 1923 (laying of the foundation stone on October 15). The design was made by architects Gabriele Rechichi and Italo Azzimonti. The first Holy Mass was celebrated in 1924 in a temporary wooden church. The actual church was built starting in 1925 and was consecrated ten years later.

In 1930 the church became the seat of the fifth parish of Busto Arsizio: in addition to the two historic parishes (St. John the Baptist and St. Michael the Archangel), the two parishes, both dedicated to the Holy Apostles Peter and Paul, of the districts of Borsano and Sacconago, the former autonomous municipalities aggregated to the municipality of Busto Arsizio in 1928, had been added.

The first parish priest was Don Paolo Cairoli, a former chaplain of the bersaglieri and very active during the resistance. The neighborhood of Santi Apostoli is often called "don Paolo" by the people of Busto.

The church hall has three aisles and semicircular side chapels with some old paintings. The church is elevated and accessed by a wide staircase. Below is located the crypt. The bell tower has a square plan. The square in front is dedicated to Don Paolo Cairoli.

== Church of Saint Anne ==
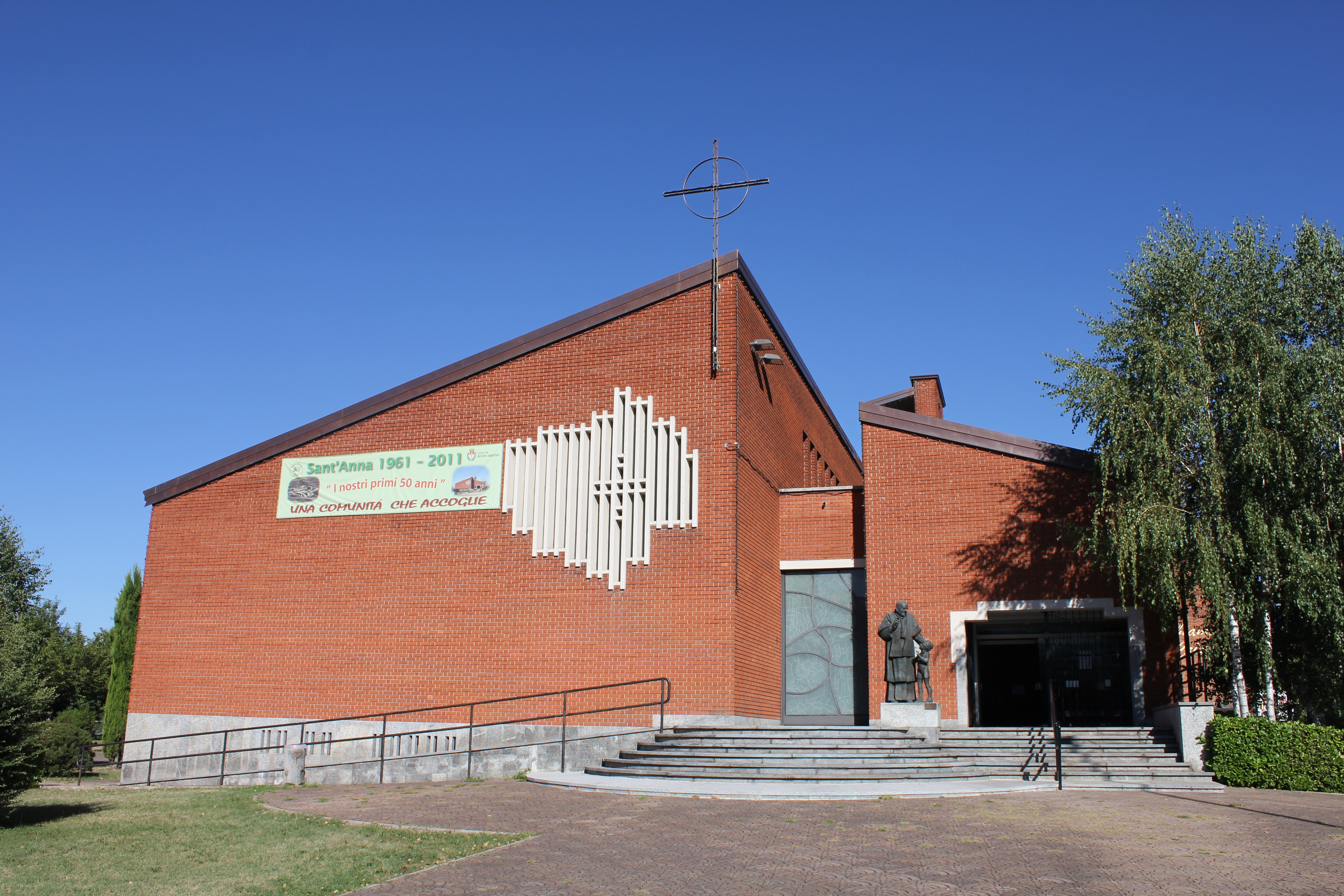
Church of Saint Anne

The first church in the village of the same name, built from scratch starting in 1959, was constructed of wood in 1961 and became a parish in the same year. The provost of St. John the Baptist Monsignor Galimberti had a statue of St. Anne placed there from a minor altar in the Shrine of St. Mary of Piazza.

After an unfinished design by the Busto architect Enrico Castiglioni, the church was built starting in 1973 according to the design of the model churches. It has two naves of different sizes covered by a single-pitch roof. The bell tower is covered by a single-pitch roof. The church was blessed in 1975 and consecrated the following year.

On the wall behind the altar is a painting of the risen Christ. On the wall at the back of the church a Stations of the Cross was placed in 1977.

Below the church is a hall-theater, which was rearranged in 1981. Two wooden statues representing St. Anthony of Padua and Christ Crucified were placed between 1985 and 1986.

== Church of the Holy Apostles Peter and Paul of Sacconago ("new church") ==
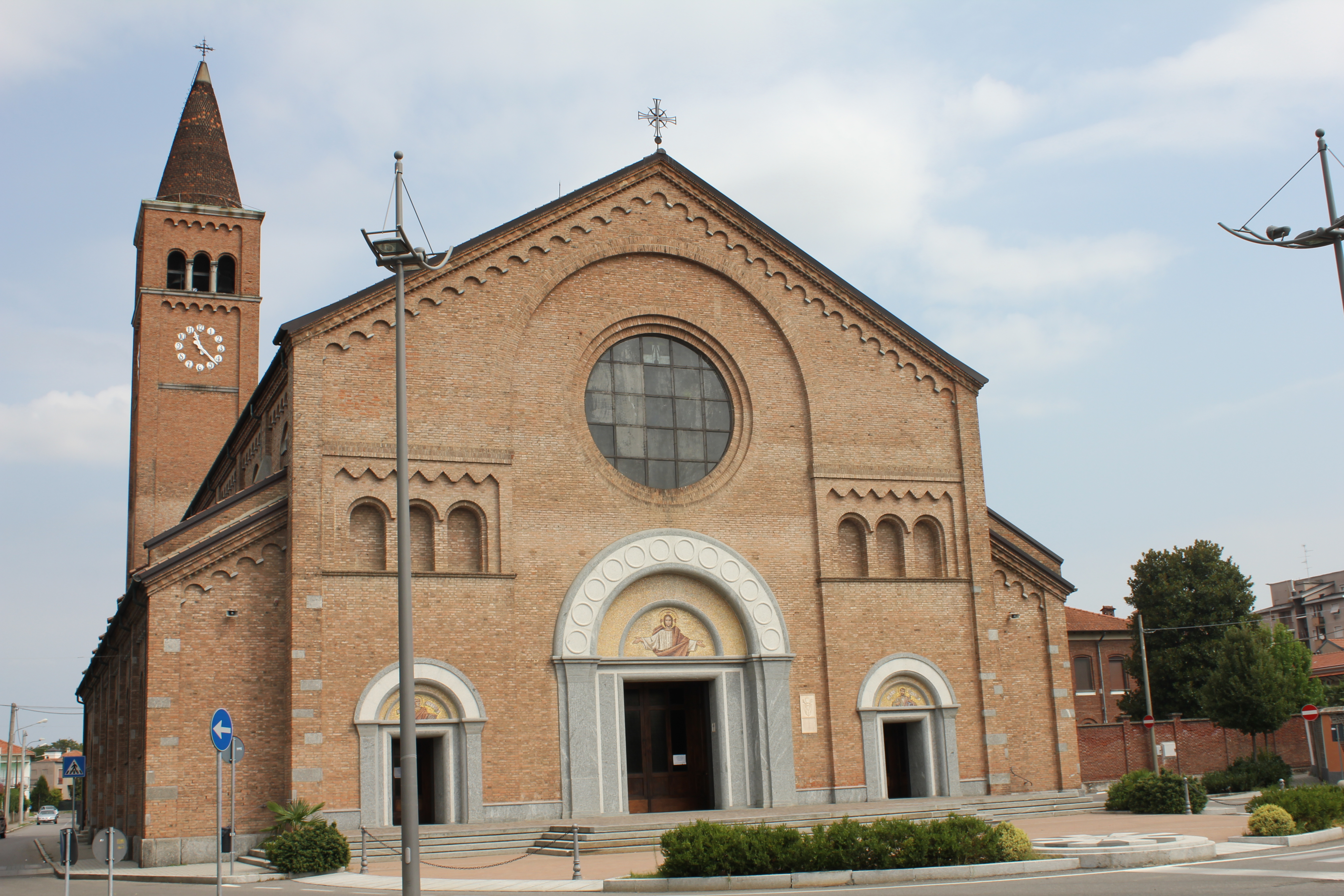
New Church of Saints Peter and Paul in Sacconago

When the idea of enlarging the eighteenth-century church to make it more spacious fell through for economic reasons, it was decided to build a new church on the area of the old cemetery. On August 13, 1928, at the end of a long procession to the old cemetery, the foundation stone was laid in the presence of Monsignor De Giorgi. The new church was also dedicated to the Holy Apostles Peter and Paul.

The first Holy Mass was celebrated in 1932 by Don Antonio Marelli, who had already addressed the Archbishop of Milan, Cardinal Ferrari, in 1904, pointing out to him the problem of the small capacity of the 18th-century church.

The church was consecrated by Cardinal Ildefonso Schuster on September 24, 1933, and the relics and bells from the old church were brought there in solemn processions. The design of the building, with exposed brick walls and irregularly arranged stone blocks, is the work of engineer Azzimonti.

The interior has three naves and a semicircular apse. A 17th-century oil painting of the martyrdom of St. Ursula is preserved there. The high altar, made of white marble, dates from 1937.

The church's bell tower, a 50-meter-high tower, was not completed until 1946.

== Church of the Holy Apostles Peter and Paul of Sacconago ("old church") ==
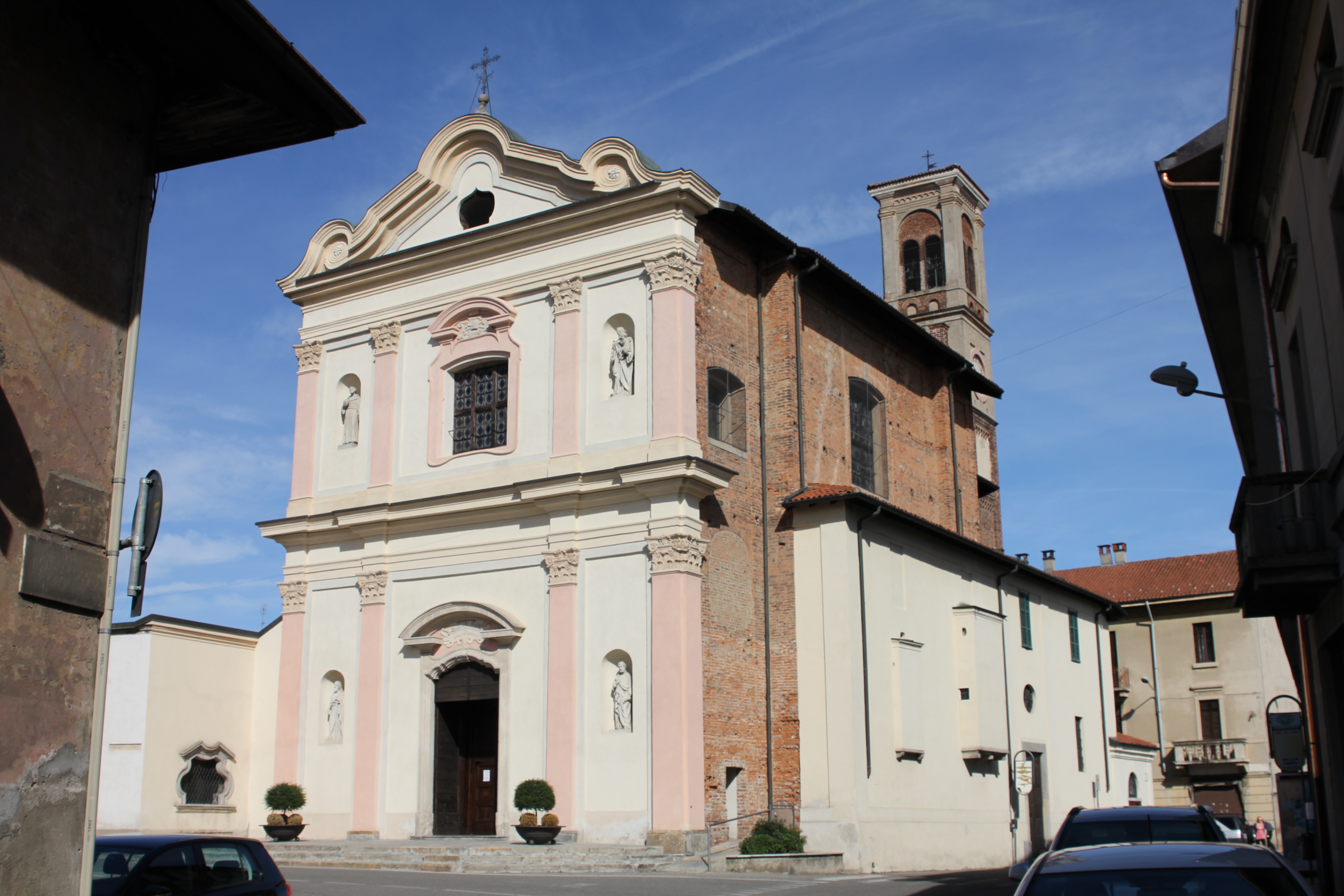
Old Church of the Holy Apostles Peter and Paul

One of the prominent landmarks of the area is the old parish church (a Gésa Vègia), dedicated to the Holy Apostles Peter and Paul, and commonly called the "old church." The present building was constructed between 1708 and 1724 in the area on which stood the old medieval church with a single hall and the cemetery located next to it.

Of the old church, which was smaller and built around the 10th century, some remnants remain, such as the northern outside wall. The medieval building was enlarged in the 15th century, with the construction of a new square presbytery (present-day sacristy) and a new sacristy (present-day storeroom). The consecration took place on November 26, 1549.

In 1580 two chapels were added: one for the baptistery and one dedicated to the Virgin Mary. In 1611, the bell tower was built, the lower part of which is still preserved in its pre-Renaissance style. In the last years of the 18th century, the belfry was in fact closed to turn it into the clock segment, and the new belfry is built above it.

The present building consists of a central nave opening onto four side chapels. The organ dates from 1923 and replaced the old one, donated five years later to the parish of Grantola. Recently, the building has undergone extensive and thorough restoration, which has brought out the antiquity of the place of worship, as well as frescoes of some value.

== Church of San Rocco ==
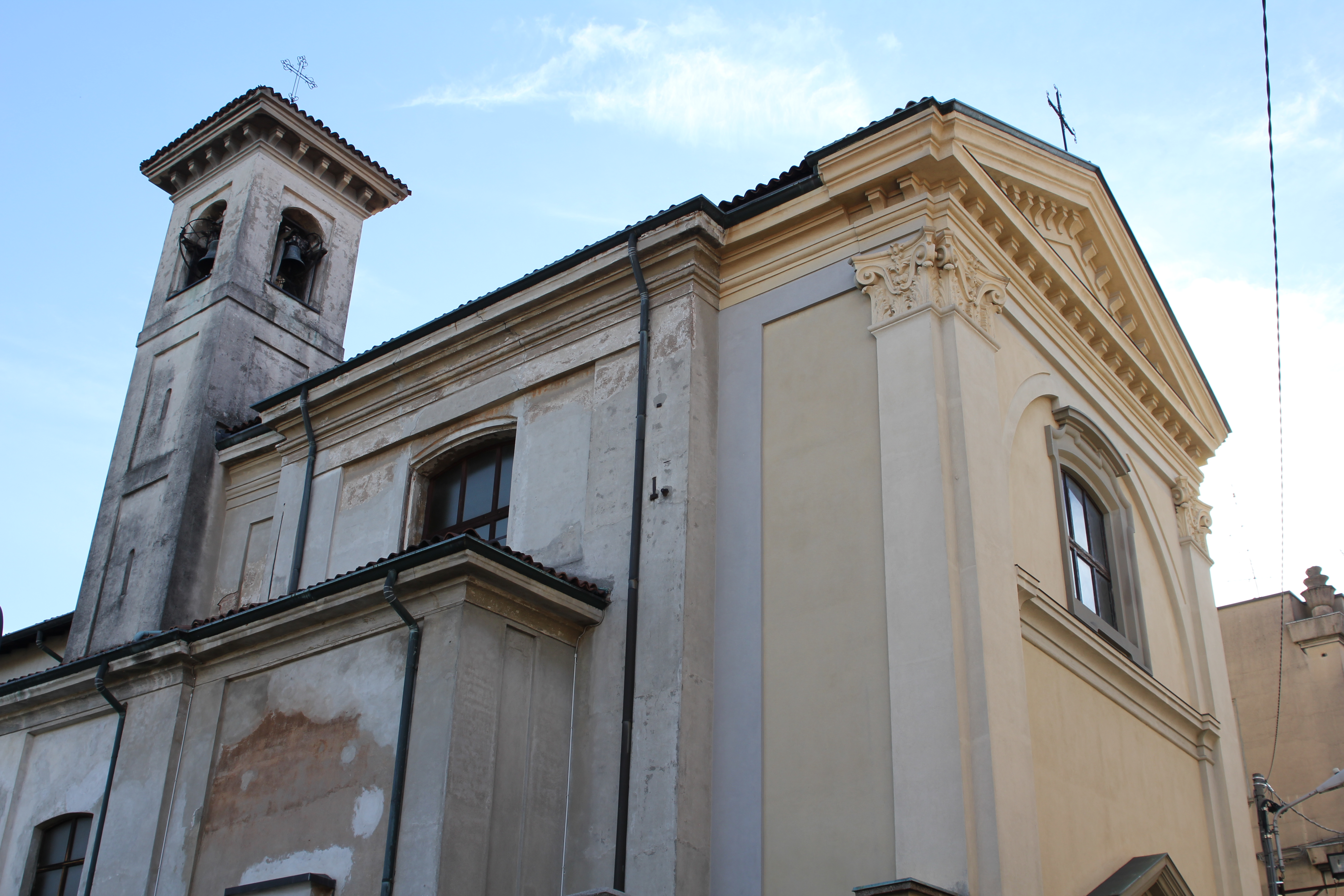
Church of San Rocco

It was erected in the years 1706-1713 near a pre-existing chapel, also dedicated to the patron saint against plagues, which dated back to the late 15th century. It is located a few meters from Piazza Manzoni, once the site of the market.

A few meters from the church was a secondary gate of the village of Busto Arsizio: Porta Novara. In 1909 the church was lengthened and the altar set back a few meters.

On the facade, completed in 1895, are statues of St. Roch and St. Joseph. The interior, on the other hand, preserves frescoes by Salvatore and his son Francesco Maria Bianchi. Once on the minor altars were two canvases by Pietro Antonio Magatti now preserved in the parish of San Michele.

Once linked to the peasant cult of the blessing of animals, in recent years during the month of September the festival of Saint Roch is celebrated there. Today it constitutes one of the subsidiary churches of the provostal parish of St. Michael the Archangel, together with those of Madonna in Prato and St. Charles.

== Church of Madonna in Prato ==
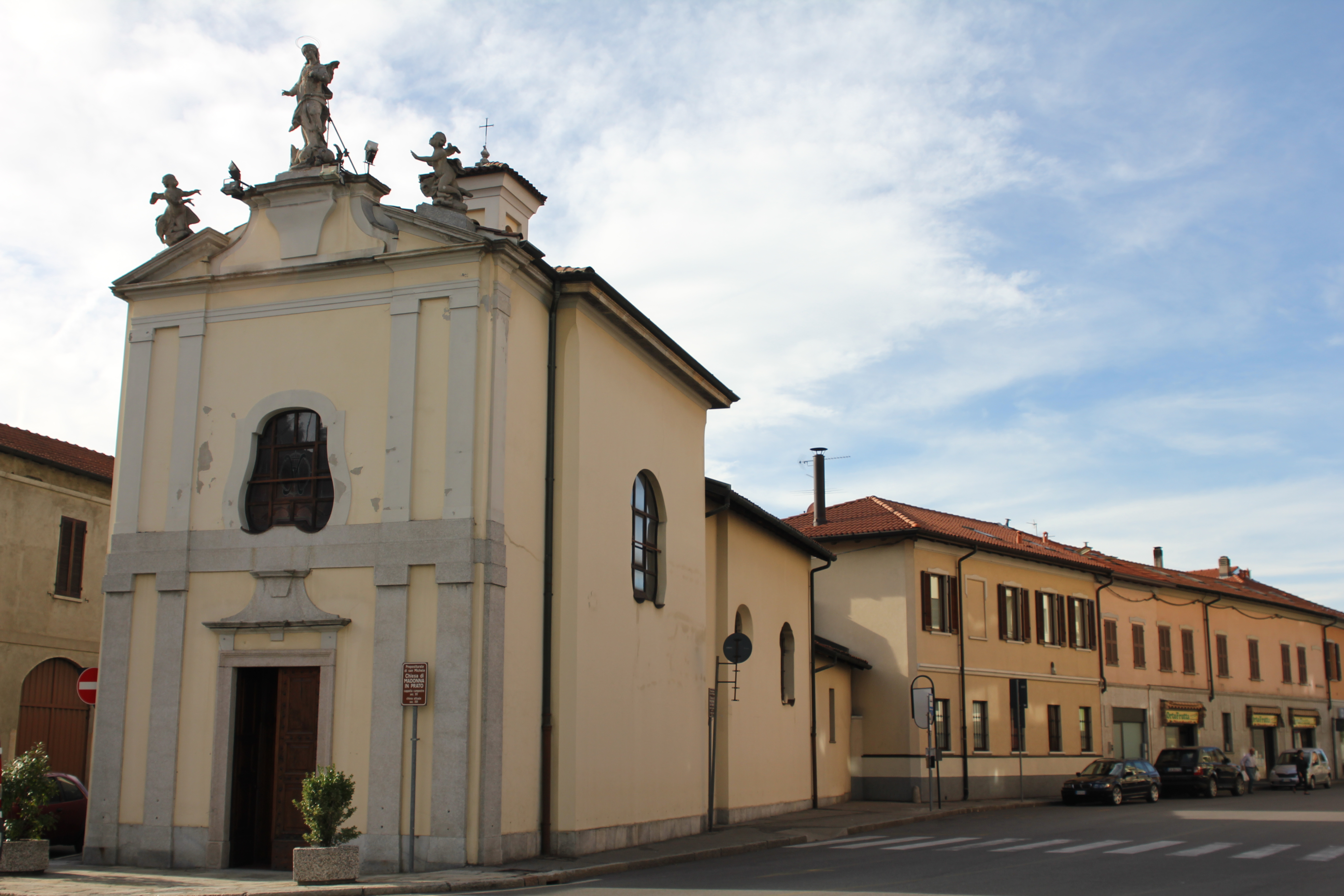
Church of Madonna in Prato

Erected in the existing meadow near the bifurcation between the roads that led to Gallarate (on the right when looking at the church façade), and to Verghera and Arnate (on the left), its current layout is the work of Canon Biagio Bellotti who, between 1773 and the following year, modified the 16th-century church. The church, which had already been enlarged in 1584, was built to replace a 14th-century shrine that featured a painting of the Virgin Mary suckling Baby Jesus. Bellotti repainted the fresco above the original, later found during recent restoration work. Also his are the three statues placed at the top of the church's facade.

The original shrine, which featured a small open portico, stood on what was the meadow of Piscina (one of the four districts of the village of Busto Arsizio in medieval times). The church was deconsecrated in Napoleonic times and later reconsecrated.

The present church was restored several times, in 1893, in 1921 and between 1976 and 1978. Today the Madonna in Prato (or Church of the Immaculate Conception) is one of the three auxiliary churches of the parish of San Michele Arcangelo, along with San Rocco and San Carlo Borromeo.

== Church of St. Charles Borromeo ==
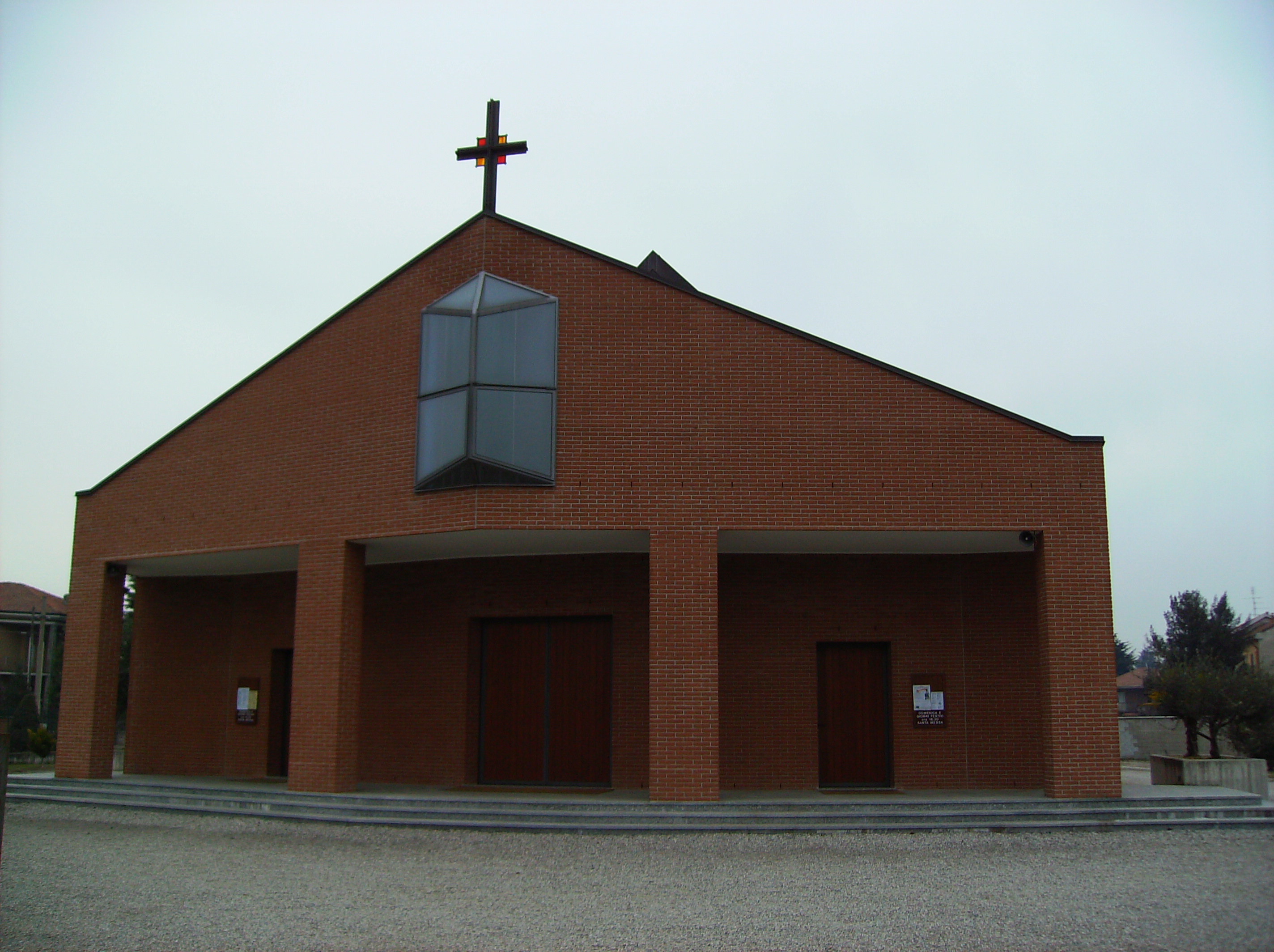
Church of St. Charles

Built starting in 1998 on land bought three years earlier, it was consecrated on September 24, 2000 by Cardinal Carlo Maria Martini and dedicated to one of the most important bishops in the history of the archdiocese. It is located in the area of the parish of St. Michael the Archangel closest to the Madonna Regina area, a densely populated area because of the social housing on Viale Sicilia. It constitutes the last Catholic church built on the territory of Busto Arsizio.

The building has a gabled facade and the exterior cladding is of exposed brick.

The church has a rectangular plan and a single nave. The counter façade is interrupted by a large and spacious raised choir, lit by the only stained-glass window in the façade, and accessed through a stairwell. On the chancel is a painting of the risen Christ and a crucifixion by Carlo Farioli.

In the large hall below the church, the Orthodox Church of St. John Chrysostom, belonging to the Exarchate of the Ecumenical Patriarchate of Constantinople for the Russian Orthodox Churches in Western Europe, was inaugurated on November 26, 2010. It is one of six Russian Orthodox churches in Italy.

== Church of St. Anthony Abbot ==
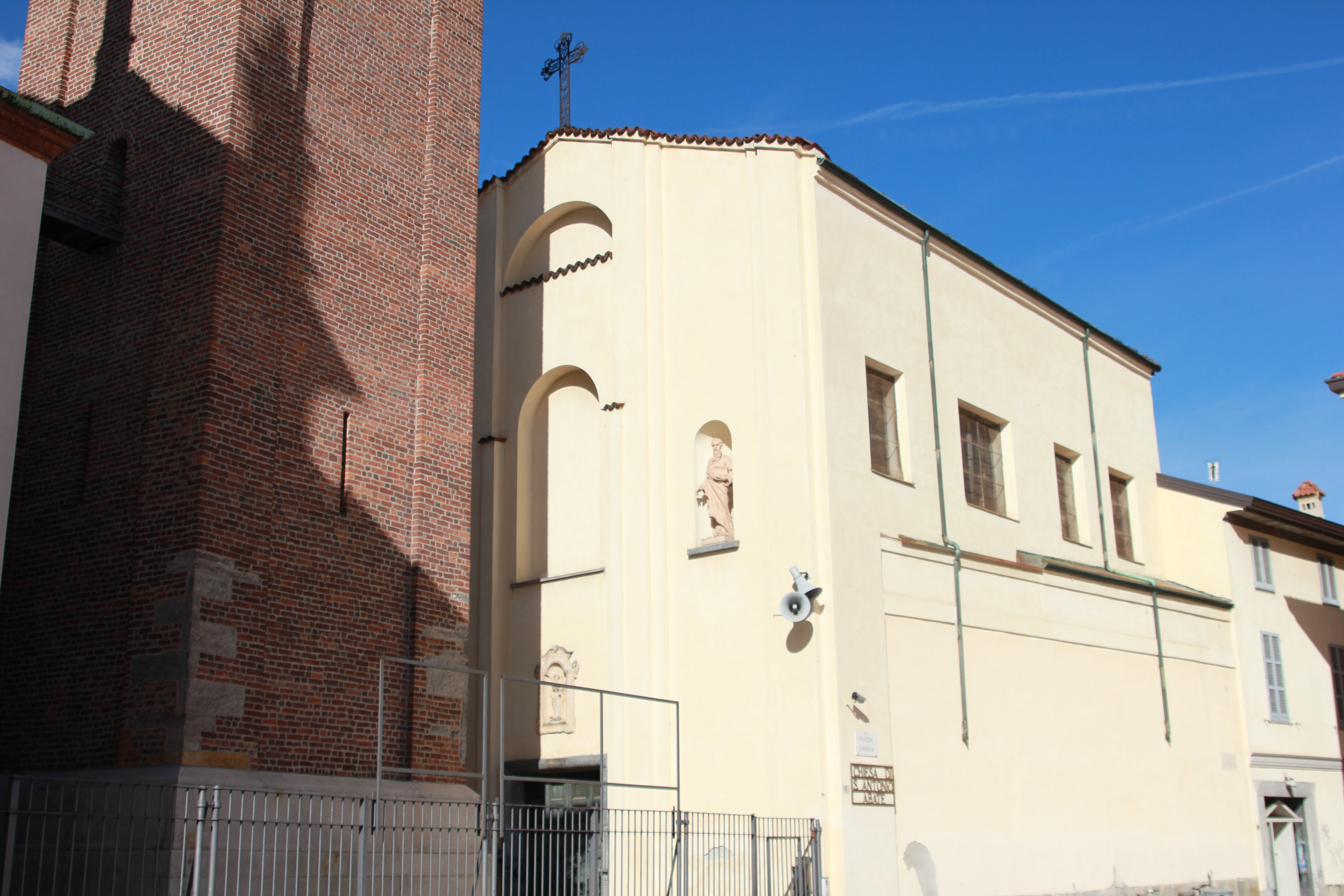
Church of Saint Anthony Abbot

A subsidiary of St. John the Baptist, its foundation stone was laid in 1363 at the behest of Cristoforo de Medicis and dedicated to a saint to whom the village was devoted, as a protector against fires. It overlooks Piazza Santa Maria and shares a bell tower with the basilica.

It was the seat of St. Anthony's school of preaching and, beginning in 1572, of the school of the Blessed Sacrament. The brethren of that school enlarged and modified the building inspired by the norms of Cardinal St. Charles Borromeo, the richness of the interior (metaphor of the soul) contrasted with the poverty of the exterior (metaphor of the body).

The church was further expanded in the years between 1669 and 1672 until it assumed its present configuration. In 1875 a restoration was carried out at the behest of the provost of St. John's, Don Giuseppe Tettamanti. In 1889 the portico that stood in front of the church was removed, and the facade was renovated by Carlo Maciachini, who divided it with pilasters. The facade decoration was then removed in 1939, and in 1975 a statue of St. Anthony was placed over the door of the facade.

Inside the church is the late 16th-century altarpiece depicting the Madonna and Child between St. Anthony Abbot and St. Charles Borromeo. There are also two paintings by Antonio Crespi Castoldi on the counterfaçade. An organ from 1727, recently restored, is also present.

The church is currently used for art exhibitions and to host the annual Barlafusi market, organized by the city's Centro di Aiuto alla Vita (Help for Life Center) with the aim of financially helping mothers who do not wish to have an abortion.

== Church of San Gregorio Magno in Camposanto ==
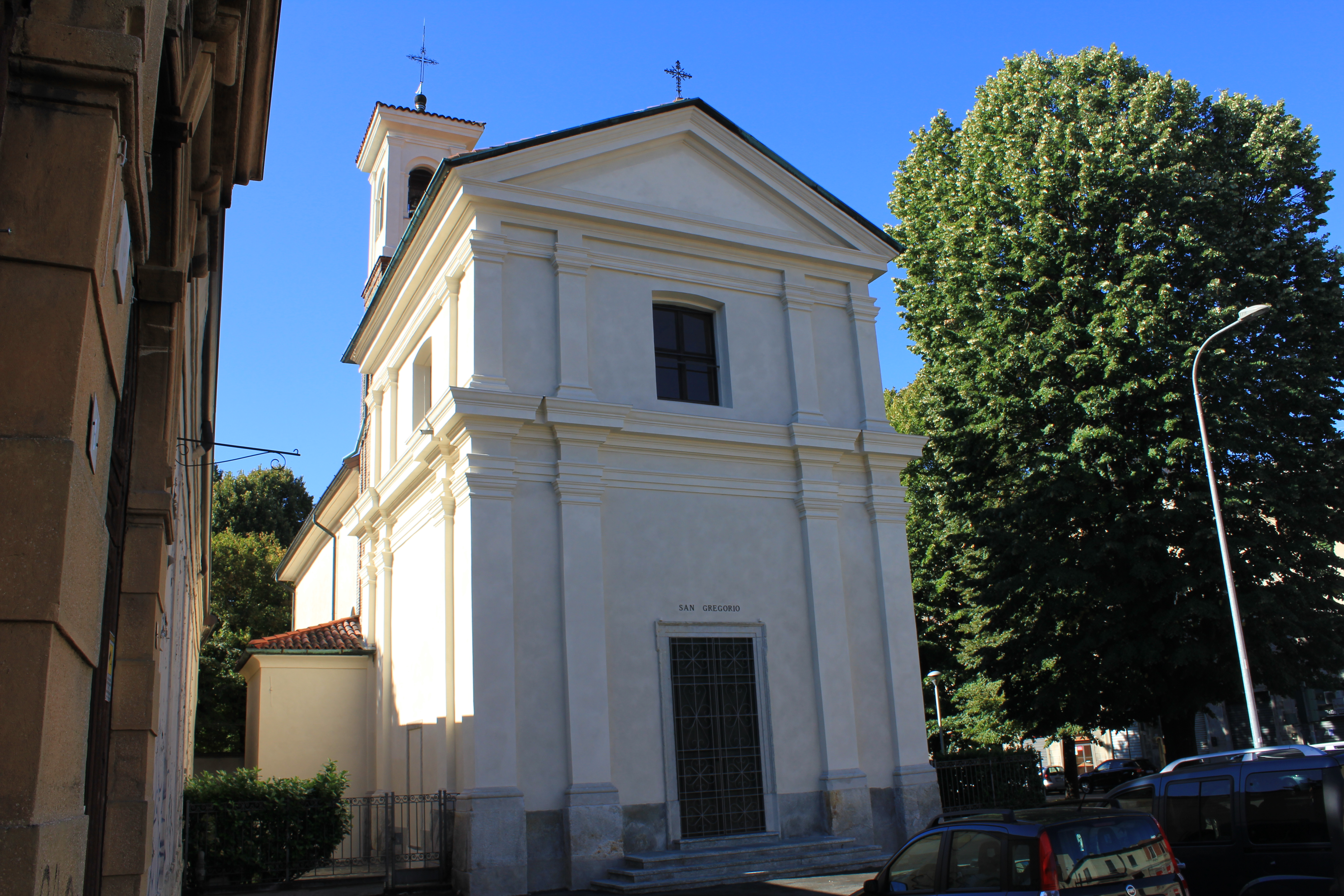
Church of Saint Gregory

Erected beginning in 1632, at the end of a plague epidemic, in the area of the lazaret adjacent to the cemetery of the plague victims. Work, which was immediately interrupted, continued between 1656 and 1659. The style of the church, belonging to the parish of St. John the Baptist, is Baroque and corresponds to the norms of St. Charles Borromeo and the poverty of the exterior.

In 1719 the bell tower and new sacristy were built. The marble altar replaced the brick one in 1736. The church was substantially enlarged in 1743. The vault was painted by Biagio Bellotti around 1745.

Between 1924 and 1926, a new sacristy was added at the back of the church and renovations were carried out, including the relocation of the altar to the back of the church, where the altarpiece commemorates the miracle of St Gregory the Great, who, in 590, after a solemn procession, managed to stop the plague. Outside, near the western wall of the church, a copy of the votive column was placed in 1941.

In 2012, when restoration work was completed, St. Gregory's became the first religious building in Lombardy equipped with district heating.

== Civic Temple of the Blessed Virgin of Graces ==
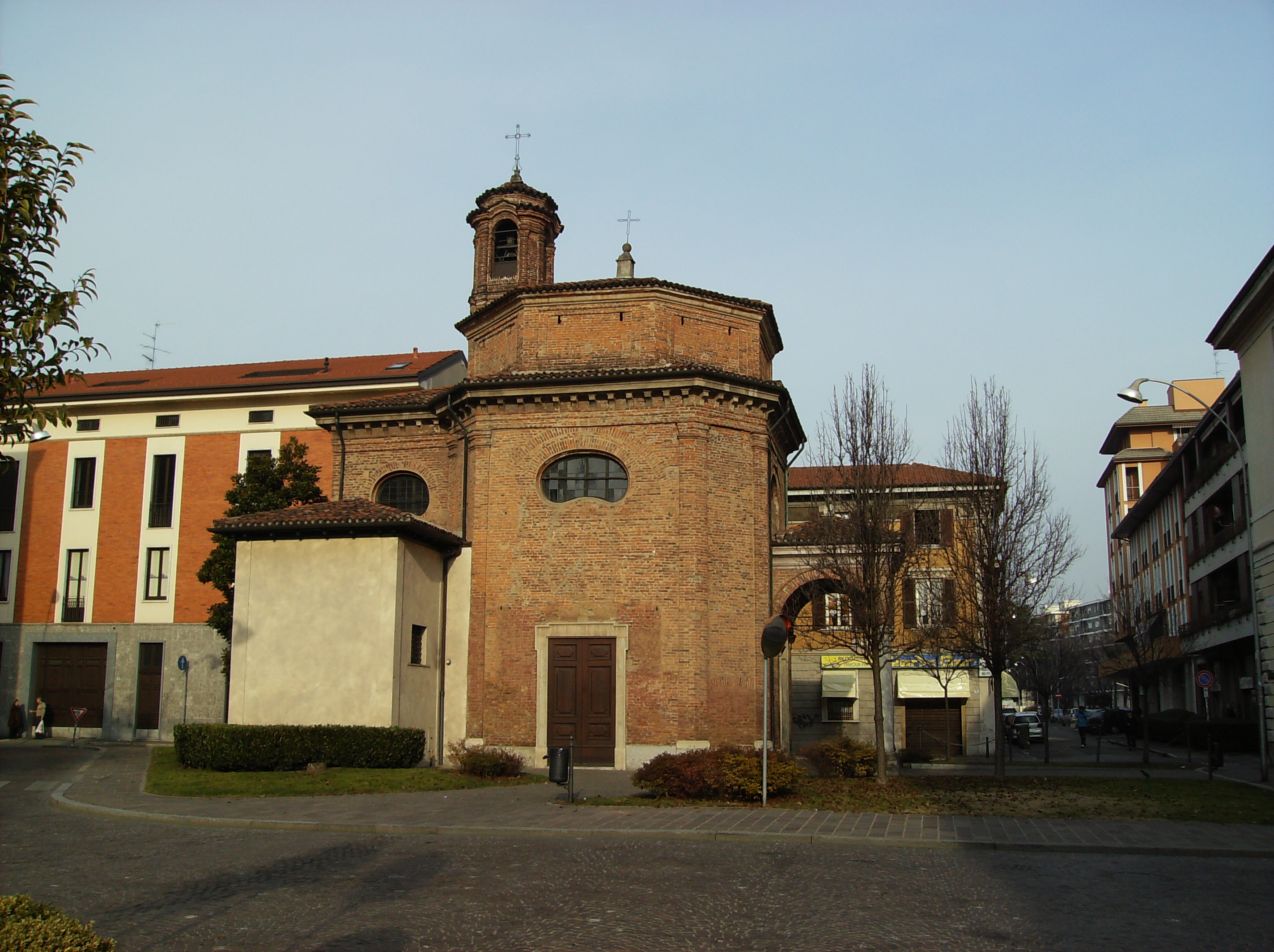
Blessed Virgin of Graces

Also known as the church of St. Anne (not to be confused with the church of the Busto parish of the same name) because of a fresco depicting the Pietà with the saint in the company of St. Joseph, the temple was built between 1710 and 1714, thanks to Canon Benedetto Landriani in the place where this image was venerated. Later, the building that currently houses the municipal house, namely Palazzo Gilardoni, was built opposite the church.

The building has an almost octagonal plan, while the exterior is made of exposed brick.

Inside are plaques in memory of the fallen from all wars and Nazi concentration camps. The frescoes, created by Salvatore Bianchi and his son Francesco Maria, were completed between 1712 and 1714.

The church was first restored in 1880 and later in 1957, when it was separated from a series of buildings that had been built at the back. It became a civic temple on June 7, 1959.

The square in front of the church is named after Angelo Castiglioni, a Busto partisan deported to Germany.

== Church of Madonna in Veroncora ==
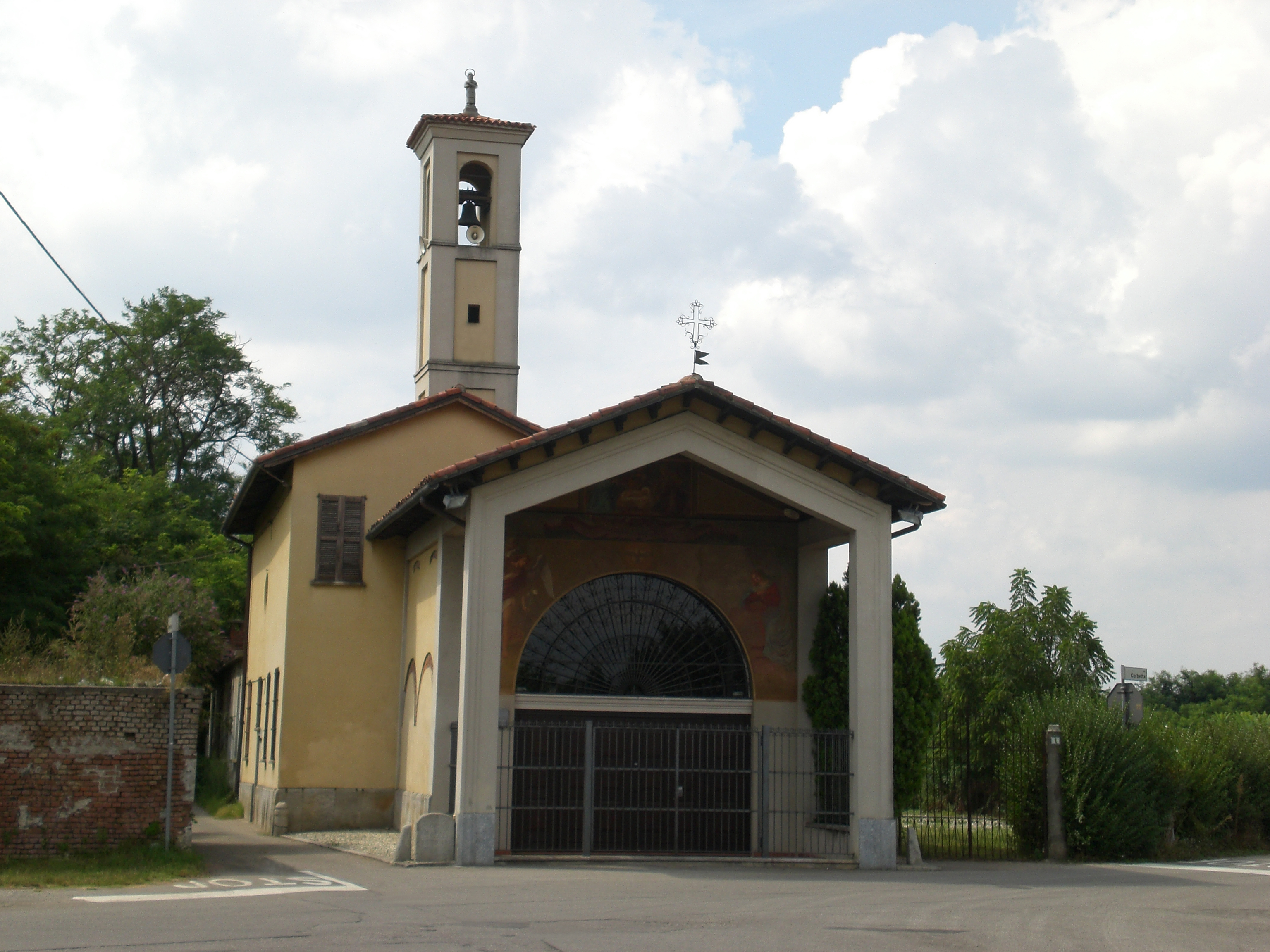
Church of Madonna in Veroncora

Mentioned in documents starting in 1639, it stood in the countryside of Busto Arsizio, at the crossroads of important roads in medieval times. It was blessed in 1656 by the provost of St. John the Baptist, Don Armiraglio. It is a small church with a square plan and covered with a cross vault.

It faces St. Gratus Square, bishop of Aosta and protector of crops from storms. Atop the square-plan 19th-century bell tower is a statue named after the saint.

In the eighteenth century, a Holy Mass was celebrated there on Sundays at dawn. It was once one of the auxiliary churches of St. Michael the Archangel, while it is currently located on the territory of the parish of the Most Holy Redeemer. The parish organises the annual Angel Festival in the church, which has its history in the groove of Busto traditions, between faith and work.

Inside the church is a 17th-century fresco depicting the deposition of Jesus in the arms of the Virgin Mary. The building underwent restoration in 1853 and subsequently in the years between 1982 and 1985. Through this restoration the paintings depicting the meeting of the Virgin Mary with Elizabeth, the crowning of the Madonna, and the Assumption were recovered.

== Church of San Bernardino ==
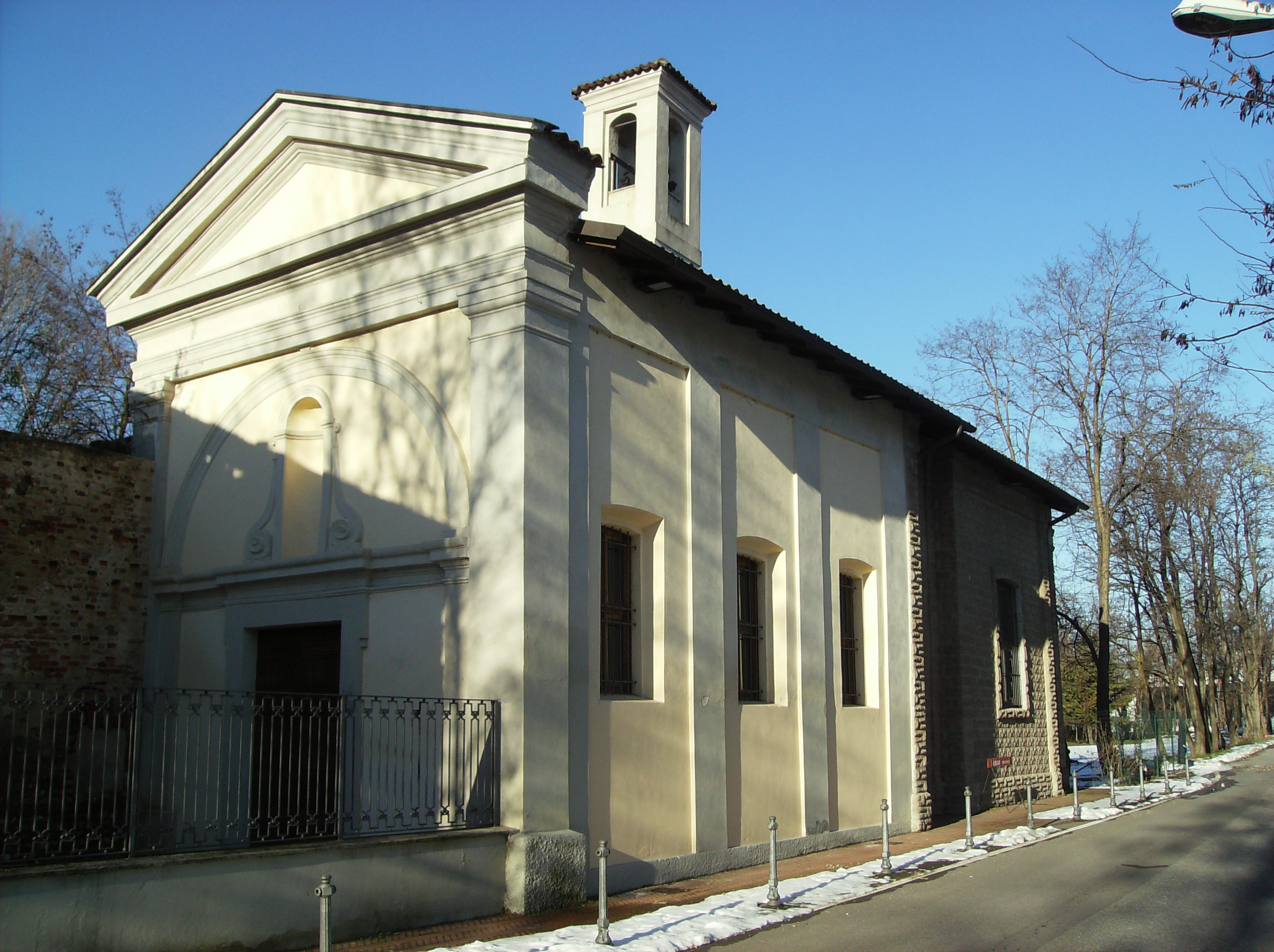
Church of San Bernardino

Dedicated to Saint Bernardino of Siena, it stands on the area of the "farmstead of the Poor," where Blessed Giuliana was born in the Middle Ages. The building was built between 1663 and 1667 and blessed in 1668. The sacristy was added in 1684, and the bell tower is from the next century.

In 1913, based on a design by Teramo architect and adopted Busto native Silvio Gambini, the sacristy and back wall were demolished to add a new presbytery, a new hall and a new sacristy. The building was declared unsafe in 1967 and was closed to worship. During those years the Cascina dei Poveri itself became depopulated and the whole area fell into neglect.

In September 2000, the deep restoration of this ancient oratory, which lasted about a year and a half, was completed. During this restoration, designed and directed by architect Alfredo Castiglioni, the roof of the building was restored and the old lime and sand floor, visible under a glass plate, was brought back to light.

The stone stoup, the statue of St. Bernardino and the plaque with dedicatory inscription to the Blessed Giuliana, all works of art from the 17th century, are currently on display at the Civic Art Collections of Palazzo Marliani-Cicogna.

== Church of St. Anthony of Padua ==
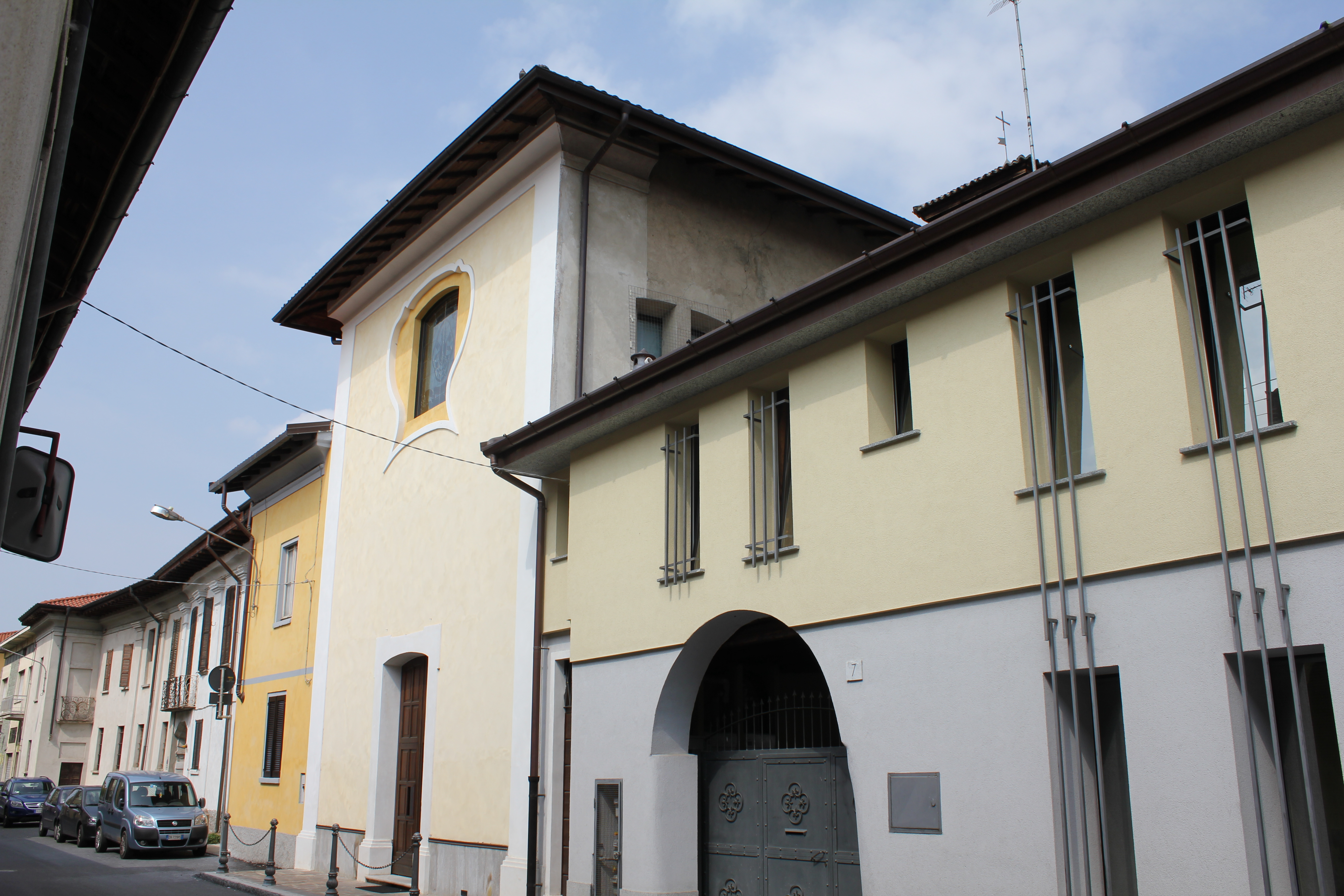
Church of St. Anthony of Padua

Belonging to the parish territory of Borsano, it was built at the behest of Count Carlo Rasini between 1717 and 1719, adjacent to his residence. The small church has a sacristy on the left while the bell tower is on the right.

Through restoration in 2007, some valuable frescoes have been revealed on the walls. The paintings can be assigned to the painter Giovanni Stefano Doneda Montalti Jr. The oil on canvas behind the altar depicts St. Anthony, the Guardian Angel with the Child Jesus and, higher up, the Virgin Mary. The subject of the fresco on the left wall behind the altar is the miracle of the mule. The fresco on the right wall behind the altar depicts the miracle of the healed foot.

On the facade of the church was a panel dedicated to the saint. As early as the 1960s, the colors had almost disappeared, and in 1985 the Folklore and Sports Club decided to commission the Busto painter Gigi Magugliani to create a new painting, which was then installed in place of the previous one. The panel was removed during subsequent restorations, and it became impossible to return it to the same position.

In 2012, after the restoration commissioned by the Borsanese Club from Giulia Lucarelli and Silvio Combi, the painting was placed inside an exposed steel and glass structure, designed by architects Elena Colombo and Davide Candiani and placed at the intersection of Via Novara and Via 24 Maggio, in a flowerbed granted by Agesp, the former Busto municipal utility.

== Church of Madonna in Campagna ==
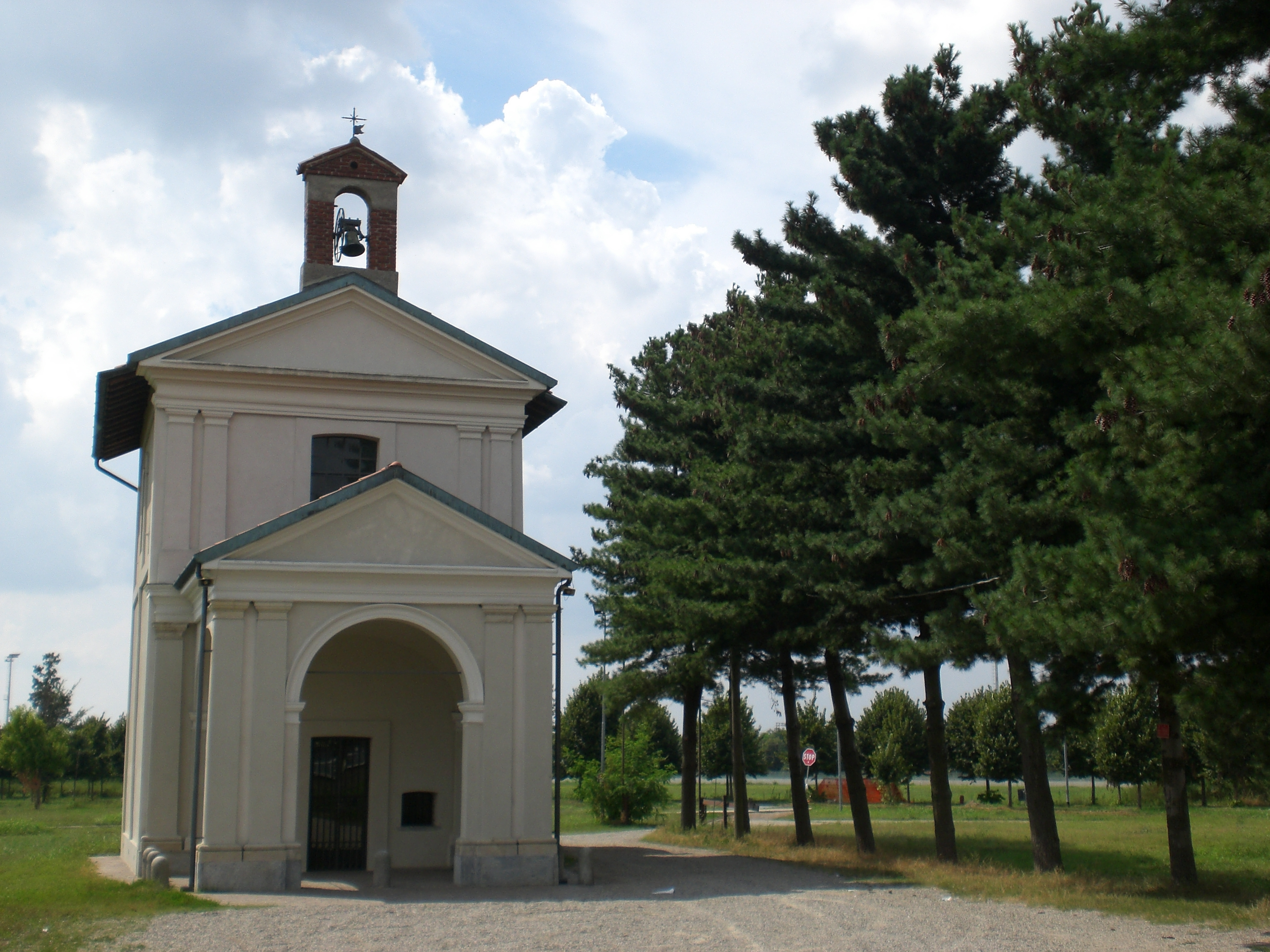
Church of Madonna in Campagna

Dedicated to the Blessed Virgin of the Seven Sorrows, it stands on the road called In Longù, which connected Sacconago with Ferno. It was built starting in 1702 on the site where an image of the Pietà was venerated on a section of wall.

Shortly after the work was completed, on March 13, 1704, Cardinal Alberico Archinto sent the vicar forane Monsignor Curioni to Sacconago to bless the church. The blessing took place on March 23 of that same year.

The church was equipped with a sacristy in the second half of the 18th century.

The interior features white walls, a barrel vault and a tile floor. On the back wall is a painting of the Pietà, with Our Lady holding the body of her dead son and Golgotha in the background. During recent restorations it was discovered that below this fresco was another one, dating from the 15th century that was simpler and without a background. Such a fresco was therefore venerated there even before the church was built.

Due to the recent road renovations connecting the Busto district with the southwest industrial area, part of the old road lined with locust trees has been lost.

== Baptistery of Saint Philip Neri ==
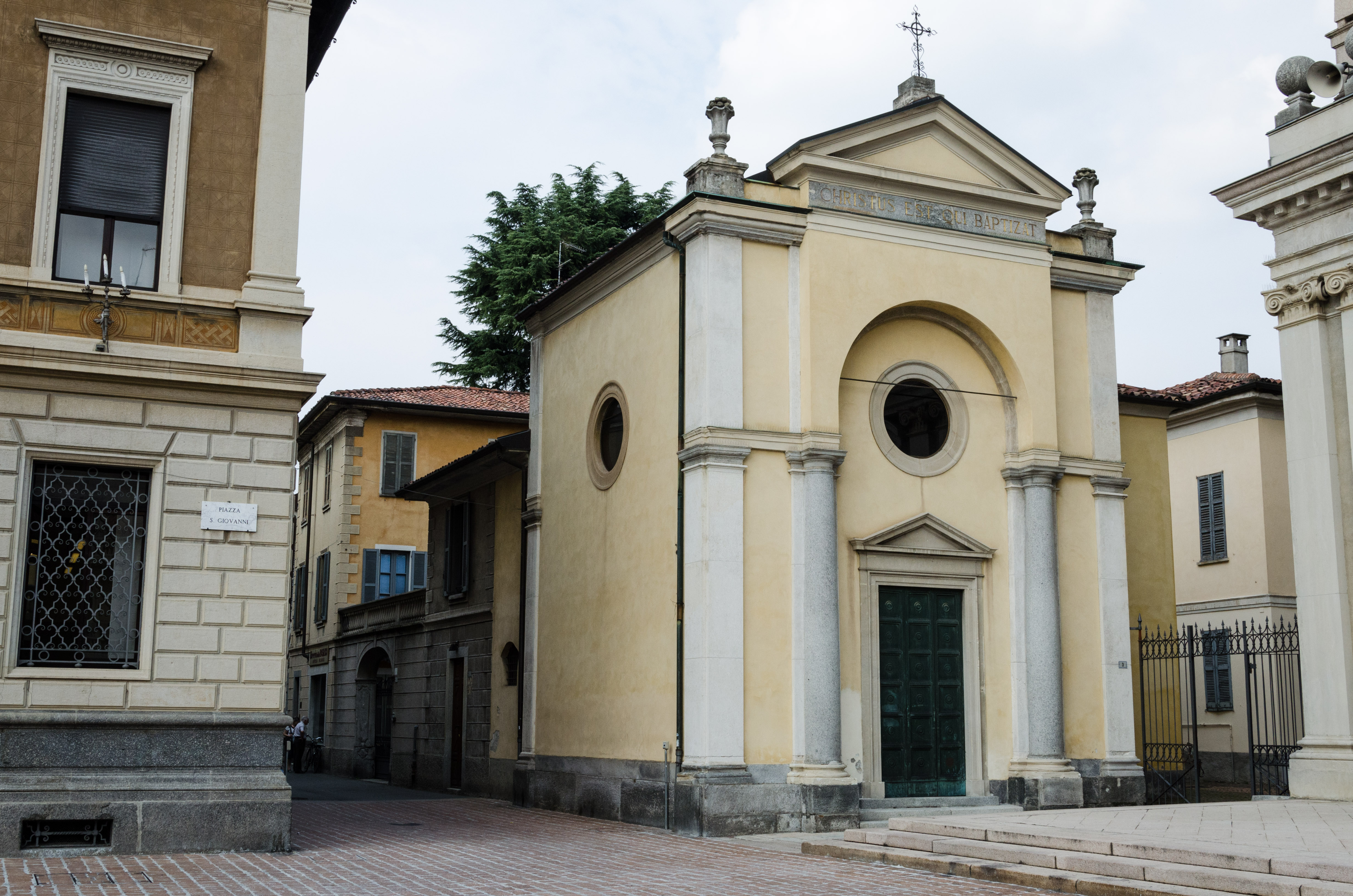
Baptistery of Saint Philip Neri

Named after the priest, the baptistery is a square baptismal church designed by Biagio Bellotti next to the Basilica of St. John the Baptist and built between 1749 and 1751.

It has two entrances: one from Piazza San Giovanni, next to the churchyard, and the other from an area belonging to the basilica itself.

Under the floor of the church are five tombs and an ossuary about 24 meters deep.

In the 19th century it underwent some modifications, both inside and outside. Between 1992 and 1995 the original interior layout was restored with the relocation of the baptismal font.

== Image gallery ==
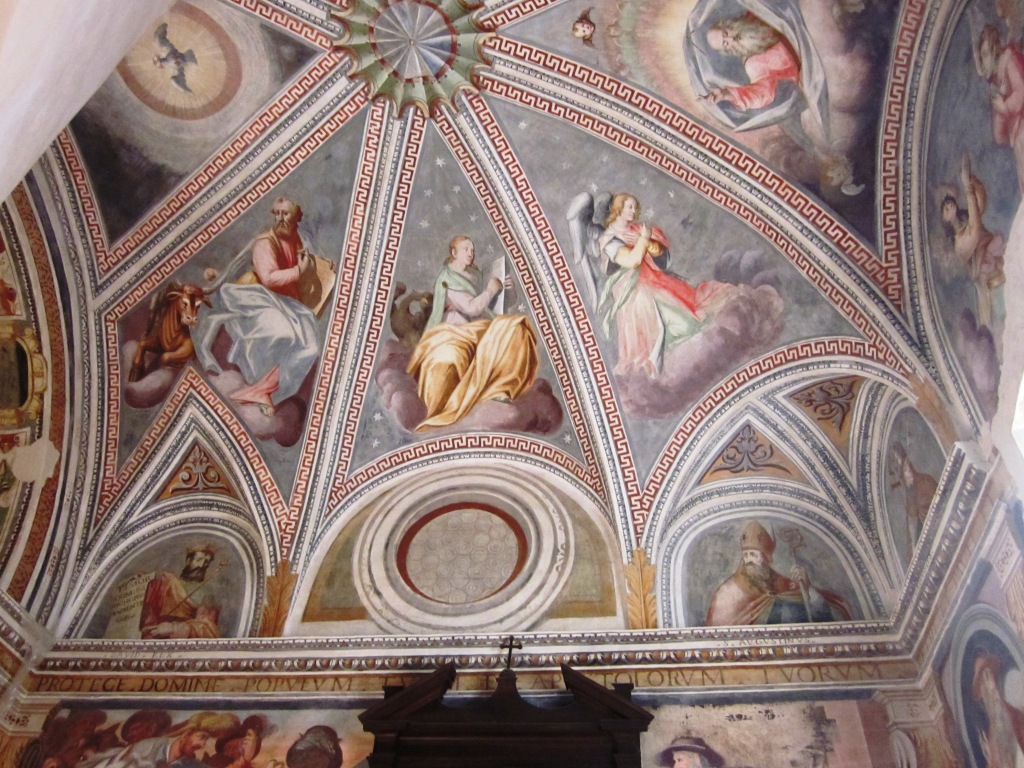
Main vault of the old church of Sacconago

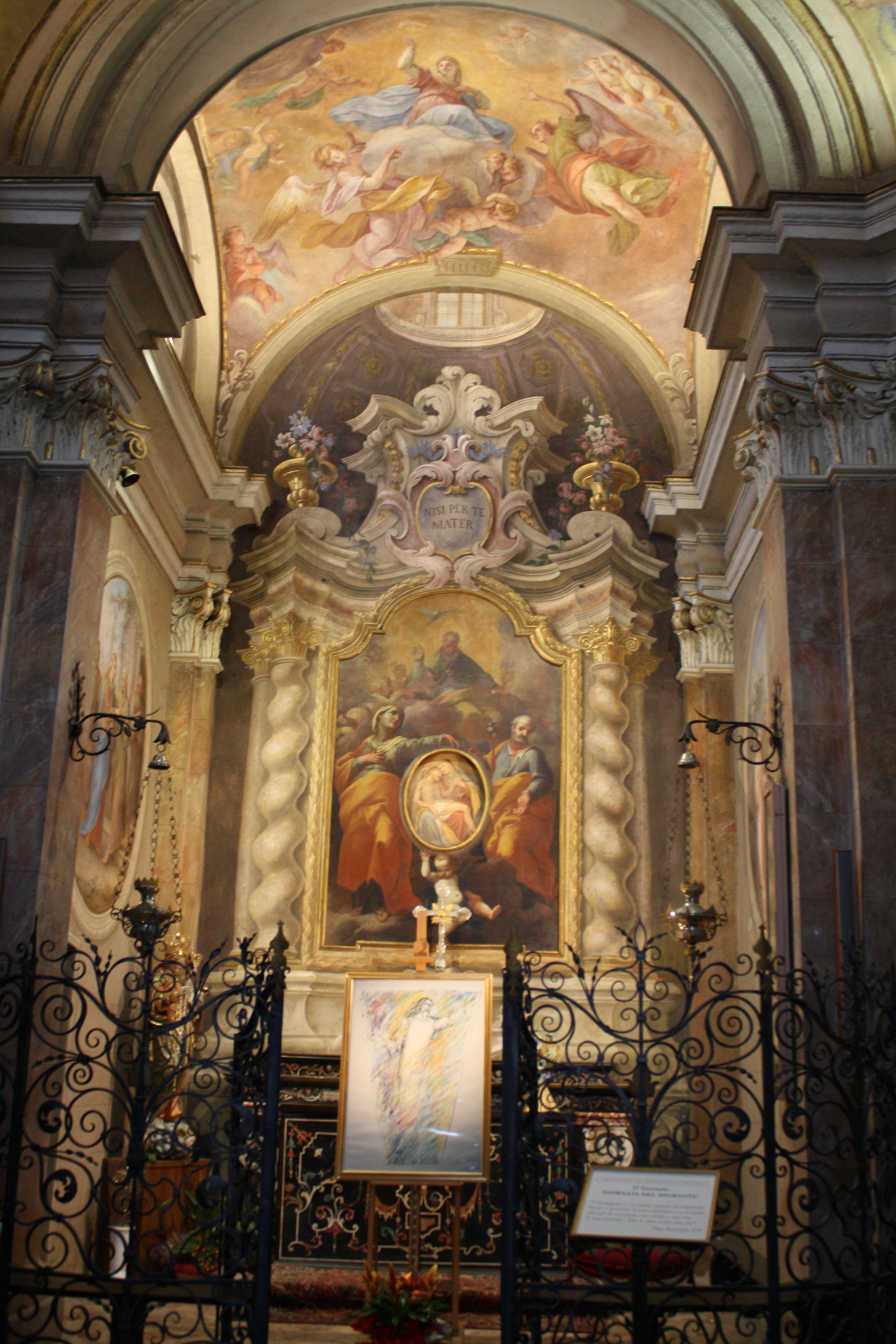
Altar of the church of Beata Vergine delle Grazie (civic temple)

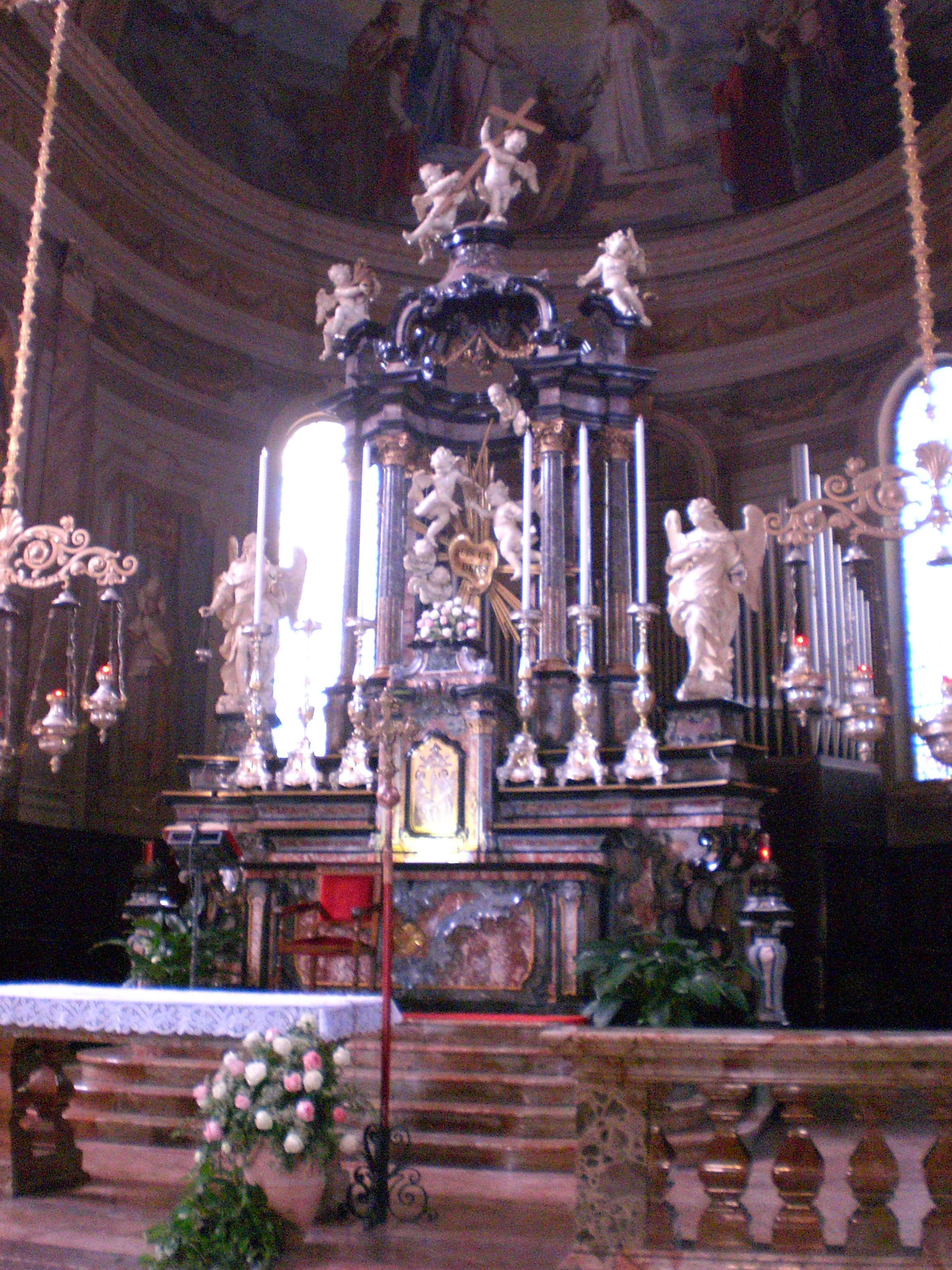
Altar of the Provostal Church of St. Michael the Archangel

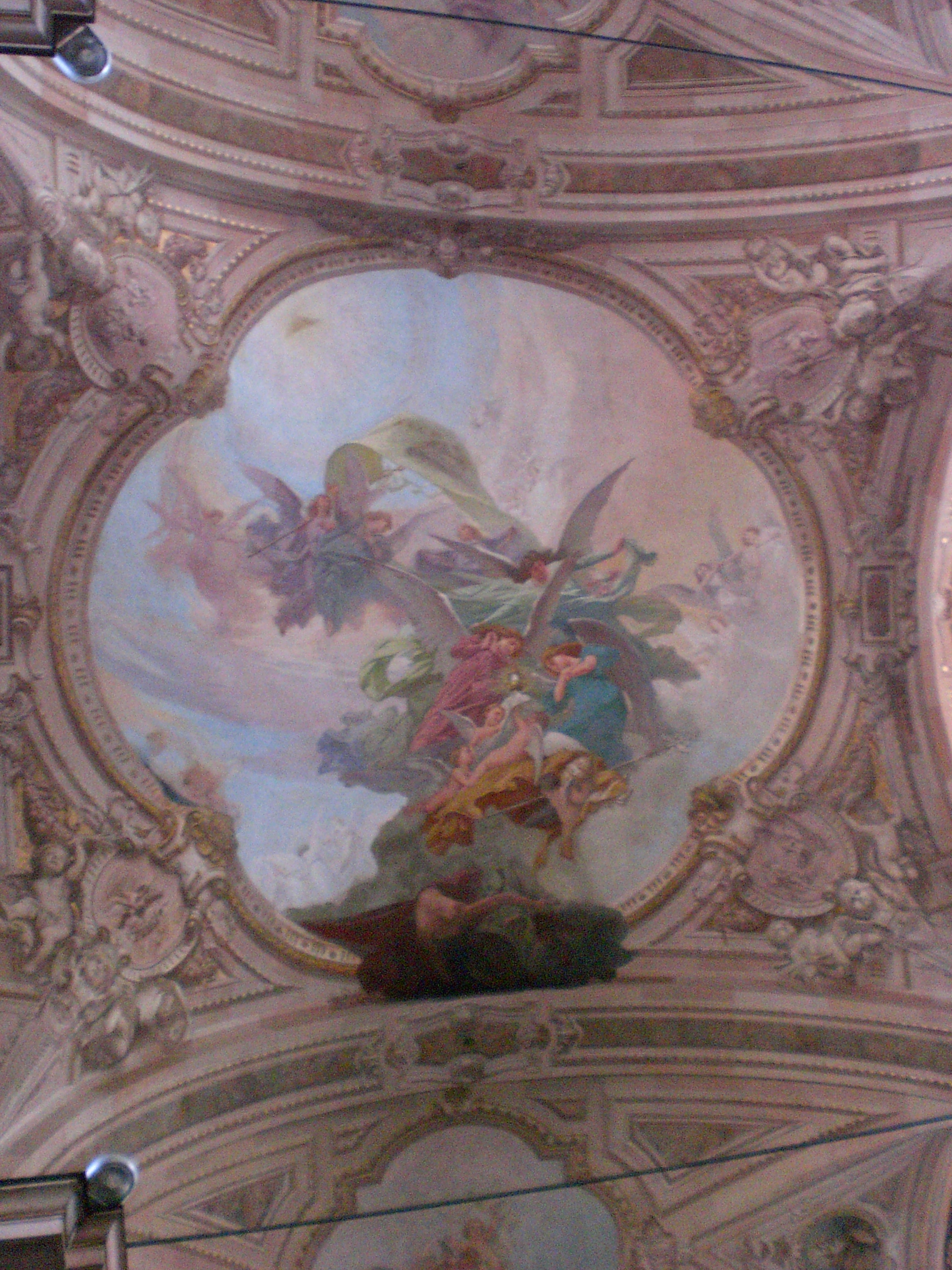
Frescoes of the Basilica of St. John the Baptist

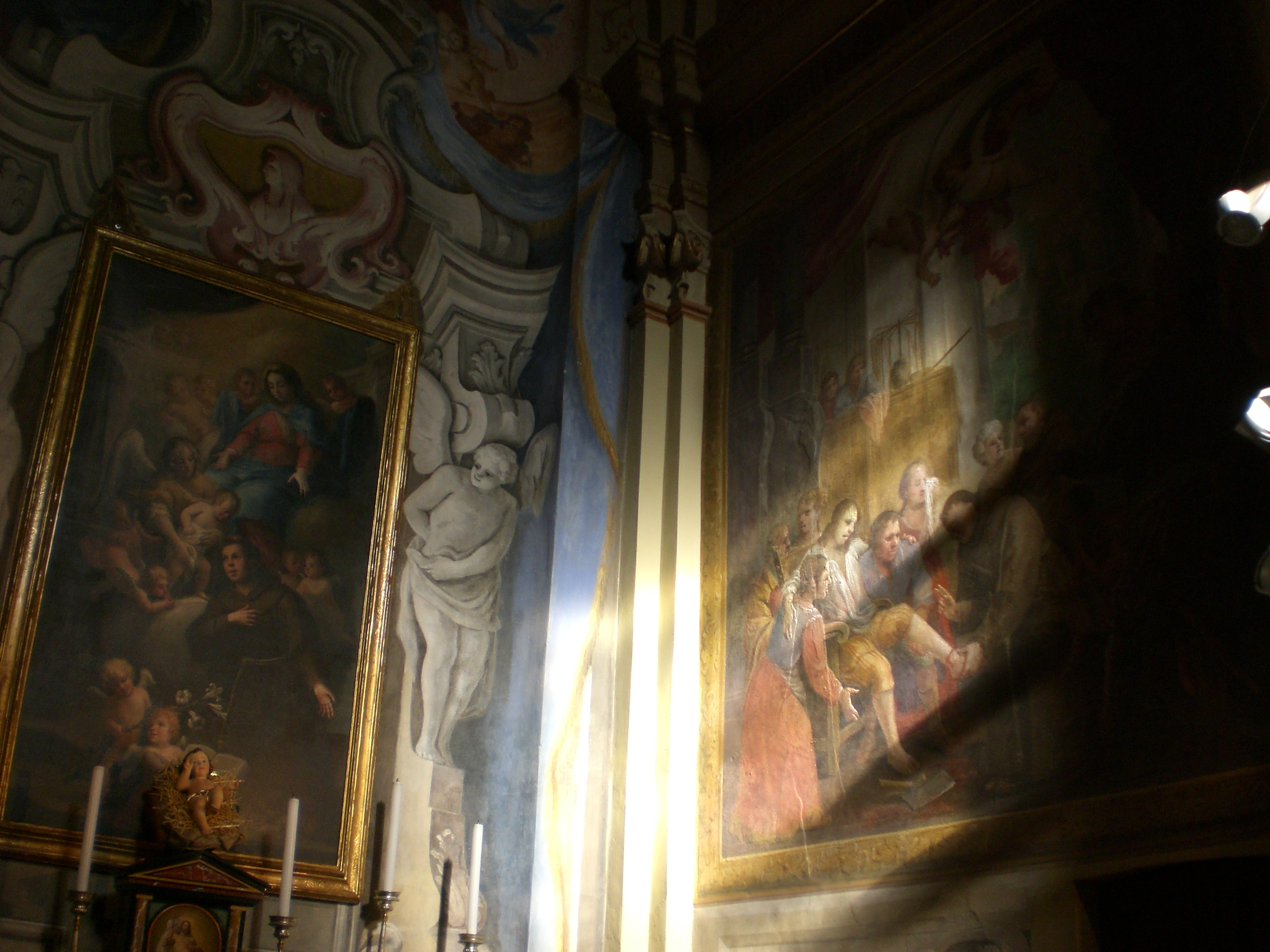
Frescoes of the church of St. Anthony of Padua (Borsano)

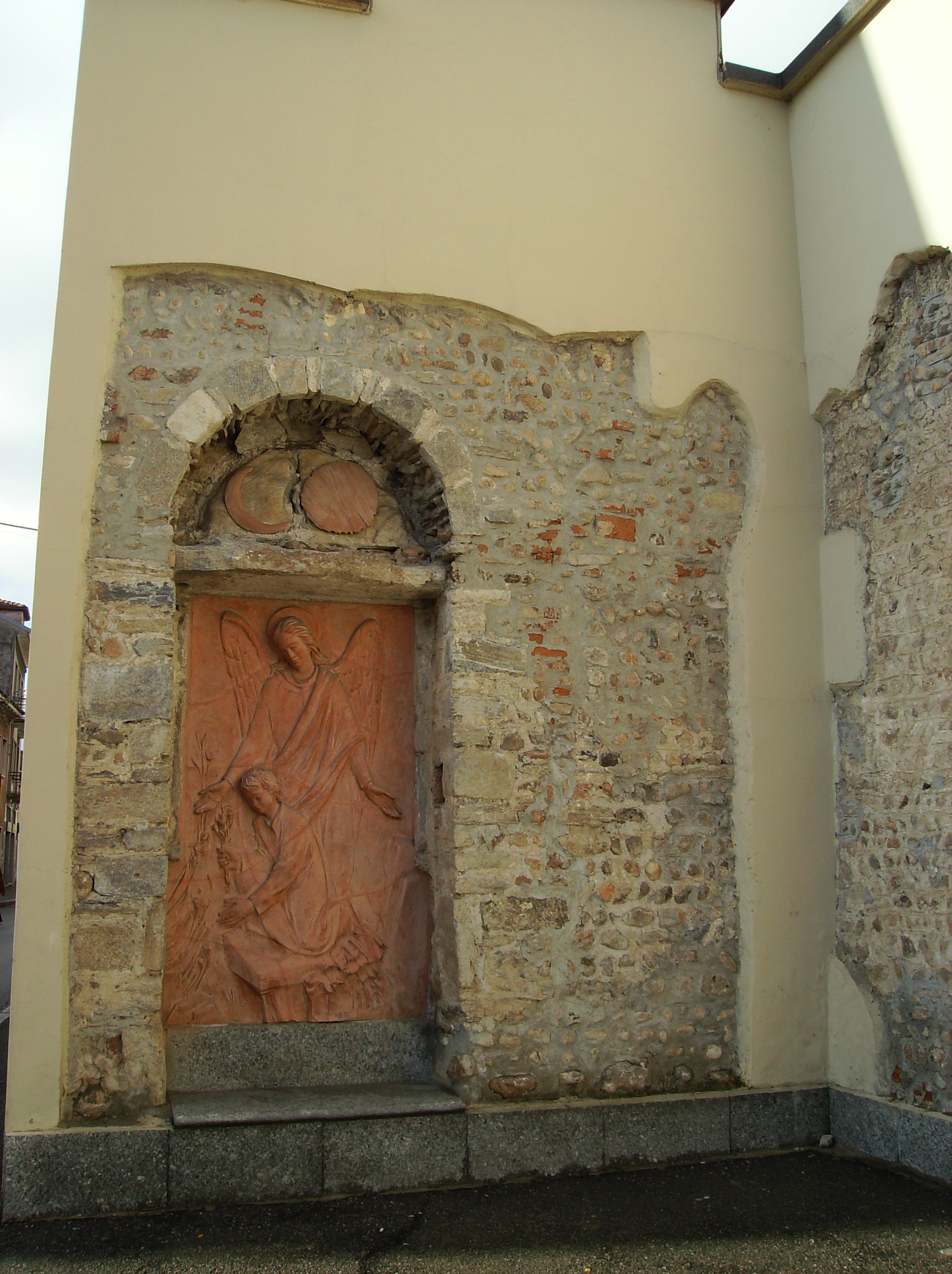
Remains of the demolished church of San Donato (Sacconago)

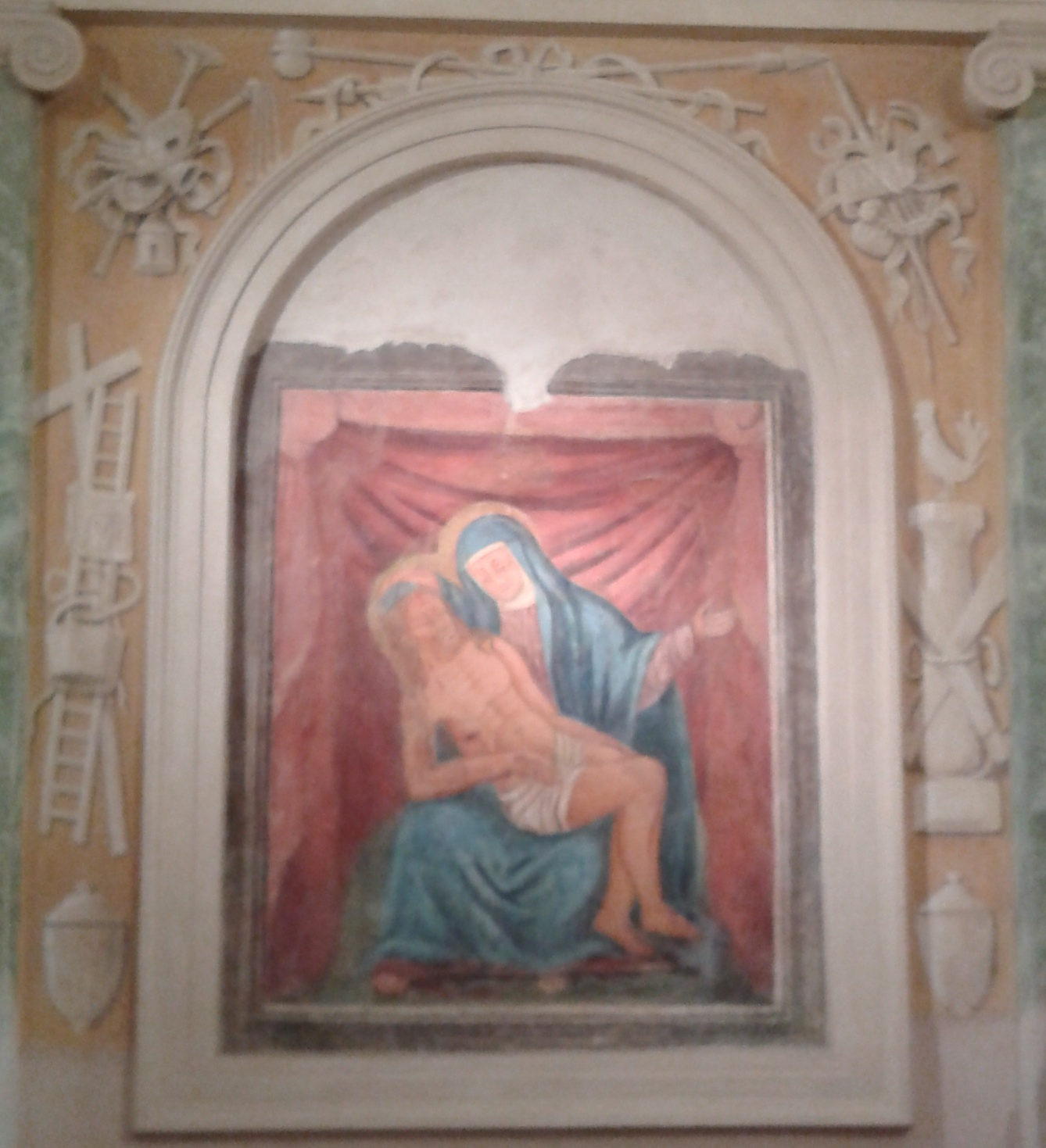
Pietà, church of Madonna in Campagna

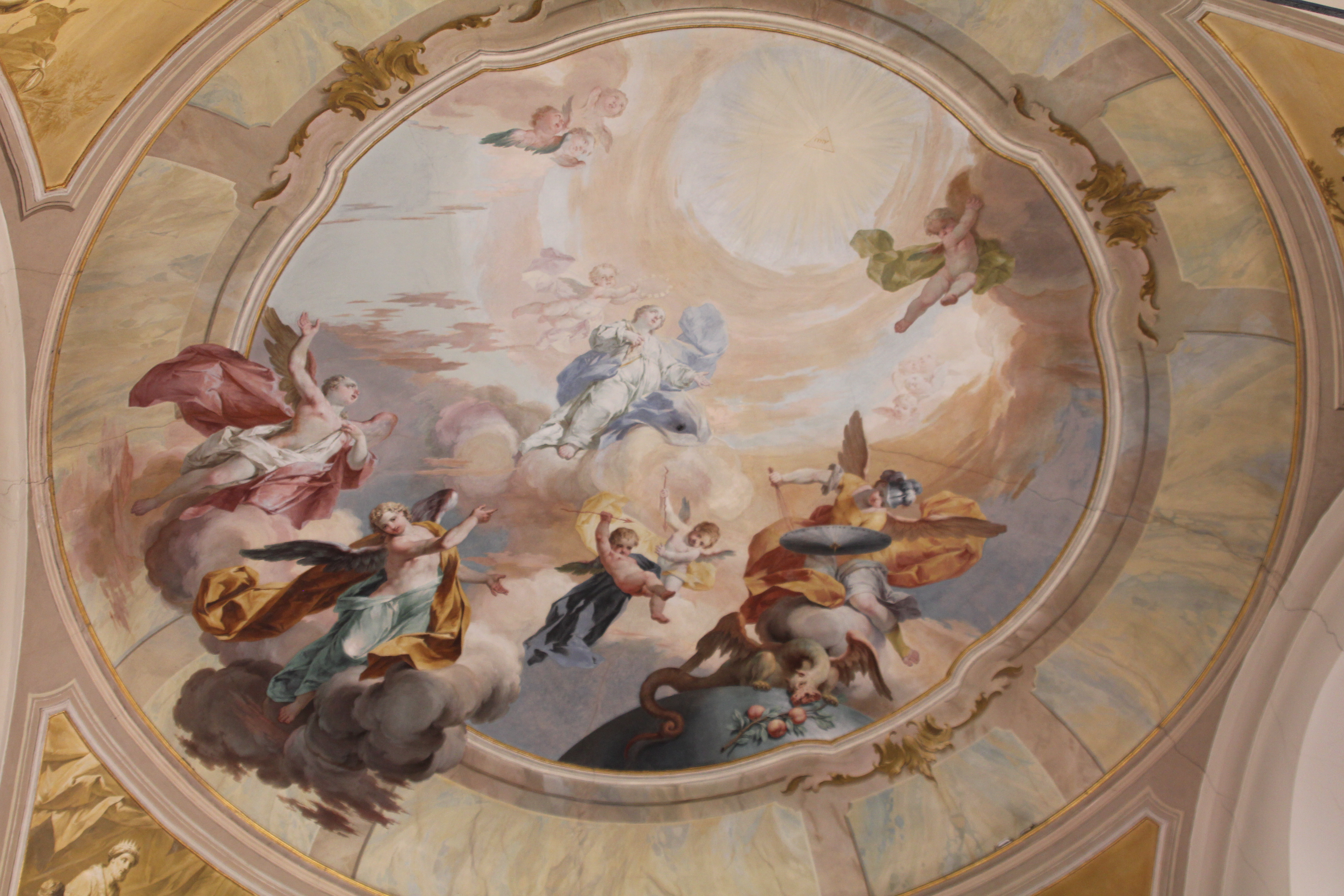
Fresco on the ceiling of the nave of Madonna in prato

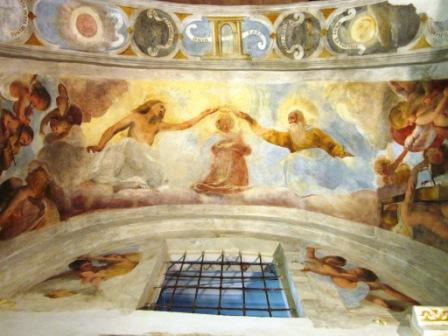
Vault of the chapel of the Madonna of the old church of Sacconago

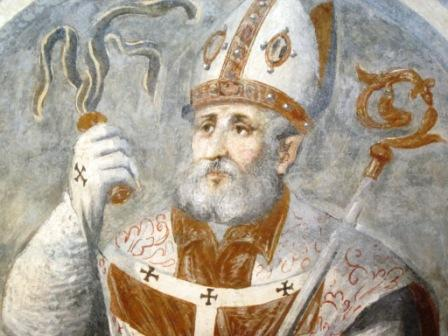
Fresco depicting St. Ambrose in the old church of Sacconago

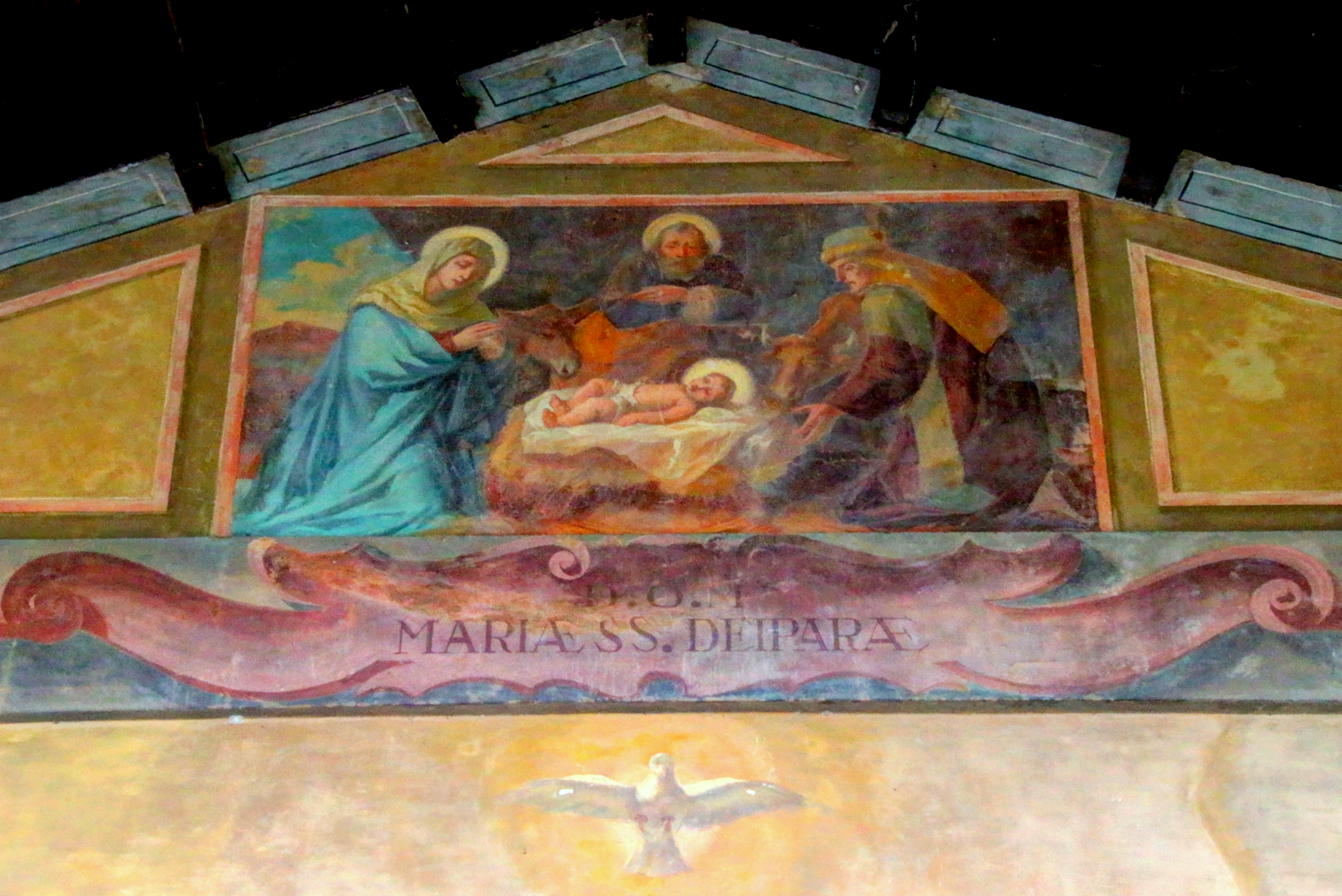
Fresco in the church of Madonna in Veroncora

== See also ==
- Borsano
- Monuments of Busto Arsizio
- Sacconago
- History of Busto Arsizio

== Bibliography ==
- Cantù., C. (1857–61). Grande illustrazione del Regno Lombardo-Veneto. Ossia storia delle città, dei borghi, comuni, castelli, ecc. fino ai tempi moderni. Milano.
- Magni, C.; G. Pacciarotti (1977). Busto Arsizio - Ambiente storia società. Busto Arsizio: Freeman editrice.
- AA.VV. (1981). Sommario di vita bustese dalle origini ai tempi nostri. Azzate: L.V.G. editrice.
- Amici del Liceo (1989). Vita bustese. Rassegna di vita bustese, documenti ed immagini 1920-1940. Busto Arsizio: Bramante editrice.
- AA.VV (1989). Sant'Edoardo, la chiesa, la comunità, il quartiere.
- Bertolli-Pacciarotti-Spada (1991). Chiese minori a Busto Arsizio: San Gregorio e Beata Vergine delle Grazie (Sant'Anna). Busto Arsizio: Libreria della Basilica.
- Ferrario Mezzadri-Langè-Spiriti (1992). Il Palazzo Marliani Cicogna in Busto Arsizio. Busto Arsizio: Arti Grafiche Baratelli.
- Paredi, Angelo (1992). La Beata Giuliana da Busto Arsizio. Libreria della Basilica. Busto Arsizio.
- AA.VV. (2001). La Basilica di San Giovanni Battista a Busto nell'opera di Francesco Maria Ricchino. Busto Arsizio: Freeman editrice.
- Gian Franco Ferrario (2002). Busto Arsizio. Emozioni Liberty. Busto Arsizio: Macchione editore.
- AA.VV. (2002). Molini Marzoli Massari. Un recupero di eccellenza. La Tecnocity di Busto Arsizio. Busto Arsizio: Macchione editore.
- Luigi Giavini (2002). Le origini di Busto Arsizio dai Liguri ai Longobardi. Nomos edizioni.
- AA.VV. (2004). Busto Arsizio, anno 1604 e dintorni. Busto Arsizio: Edizioni de "la Provvidenza".
- Augusto Spada (2004). Conoscere la città di/Getting to know the city of Busto Arsizio. Busto Arsizio: Freeman editrice.
- AA.VV. (2006). La chiesa di San Michele. Origine e storia, 2 voll. Busto Arsizio: Arti Grafiche Baratelli s.n.c.
