= Busto Arsizio =

Busto Arsizio Büsti Grandi (Lombard)
- Comune
- Comune di Busto Arsizio
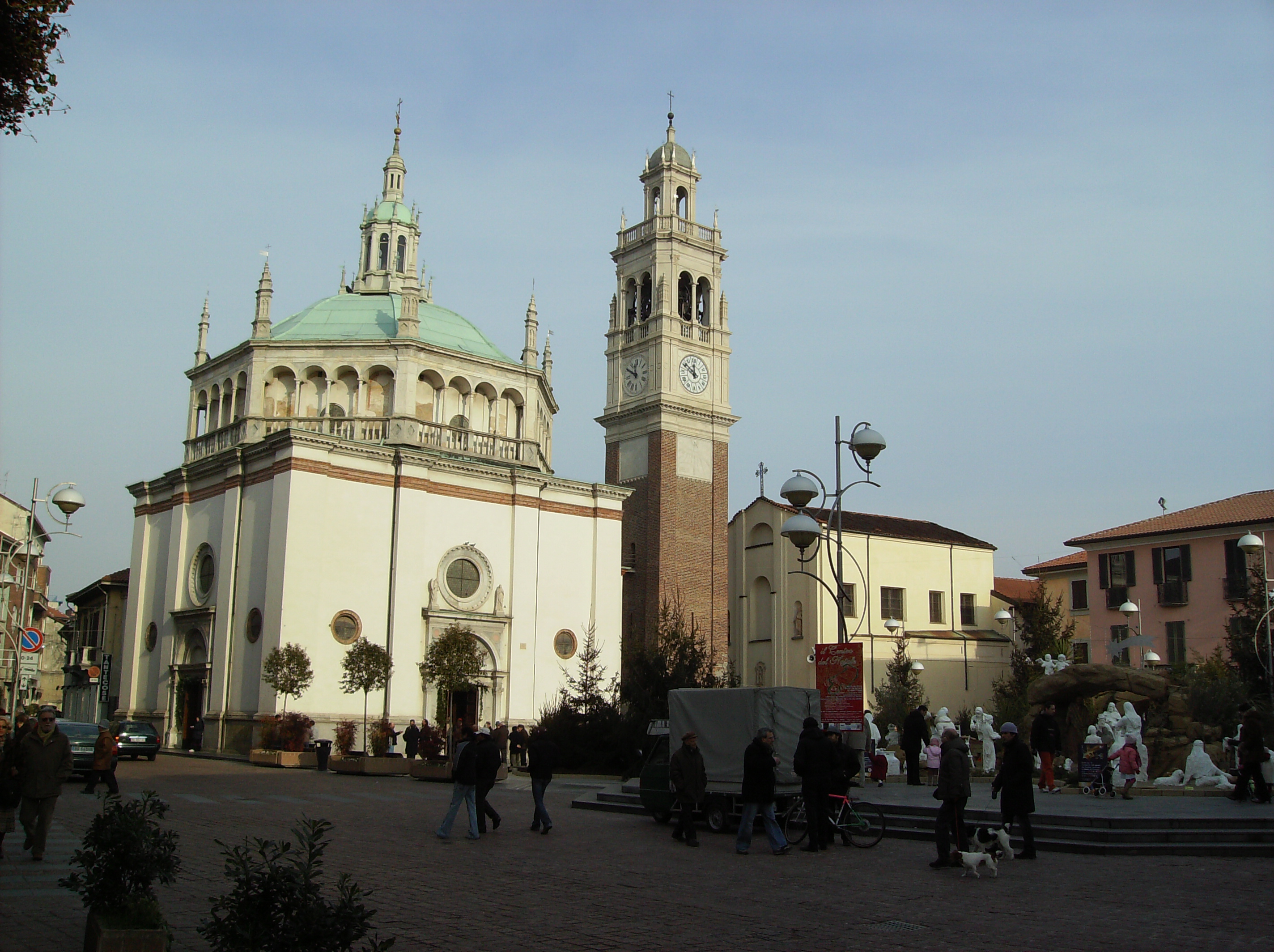
- Shrine of Santa Maria di Piazza

- Flag Coat of arms

- Busto Arsizio within the province of Varese

- Location within Italy Location within Lombardy
- Coordinates: 45°36′43″N 08°51′00″E
- Country: Italy
- Region: Lombardy
- Province: Varese (VA)
- Frazioni: Borsano, Sacconago

Government
  - Mayor: Emanuele Antonelli (Forza Italia)

Area
  - Total: 30.66 km^{2} (11.84 sq mi)
- Elevation: 226 m (741 ft)

Population (2026)
  - Total: 84,595
  - Density: 2,759/km^{2} (7,146/sq mi)
- Demonym(s): Bustocchi (for the people born in the city); Bustesi (for the people not born in the city)
- Time zone: UTC+1 (CET)
  - Summer (DST): UTC+2 (CEST)
- Postal code: 21052
- Dialing code: 0331
- Patron saint: Saint John the Baptist and Saint Michael the Archangel
- Saint day: June 24 and September 29
- Website: Official website

Busto Arsizio (Italian: [ˈbusto arˈsittsjo]; Bustocco: Büsti Grandi) is a city and comune (municipality) in the south-easternmost part of the province of Varese in the region of Lombardy in northern Italy, 35 kilometres (22 mi) north of Milan. It has 84,595 inhabitants.

The economy of Busto Arsizio is mainly based on industry and commerce. It is the fifth municipality in the region by population and the first in the province.

Busto Arsizio borders the municipalities of Marnate, Castellanza, Olgiate Olona, Gorla Maggiore, Gorla Minore, Solbiate Olona, and Fagnano Olona.

== Historical etymology ==
The historical toponymy of Busto Arsizio includes the names of streets, squares and places in the municipal territory of Busto Arsizio and their history, both those officially present in the street directories and those that no longer exist or are used only by custom. Not all place names are present, but only those with particular links to the history and events of the town and surrounding area. Also listed are some streets with recent odonyms, but nevertheless of great interest because of the transformations they have undergone over time that have changed the urban context, even though these are relatively recent events.

=== Toponyms that have disappeared ===
This section contains the names of streets and squares that have disappeared due to demolitions or urban transformations or due to simple redefinition of the municipal toponymy.

=== Ancient districts ===
Each of the following contrade (districts) corresponded to streets and gates of the town:

==== Contrada Basilica (Cuntràa Basega) ====
The Contrada Basilica was one of the four contrade comprising the territory around the basilica of St John the Baptist, from which it takes its name (basega literally means basilica). In the second half of the 19th century, the chronicler Luigi Ferrario reported the name Porta Milano as the new toponym of the district, since the gate (renamed Porta Milano) led to the Simplon road and thus to the city of Milan.

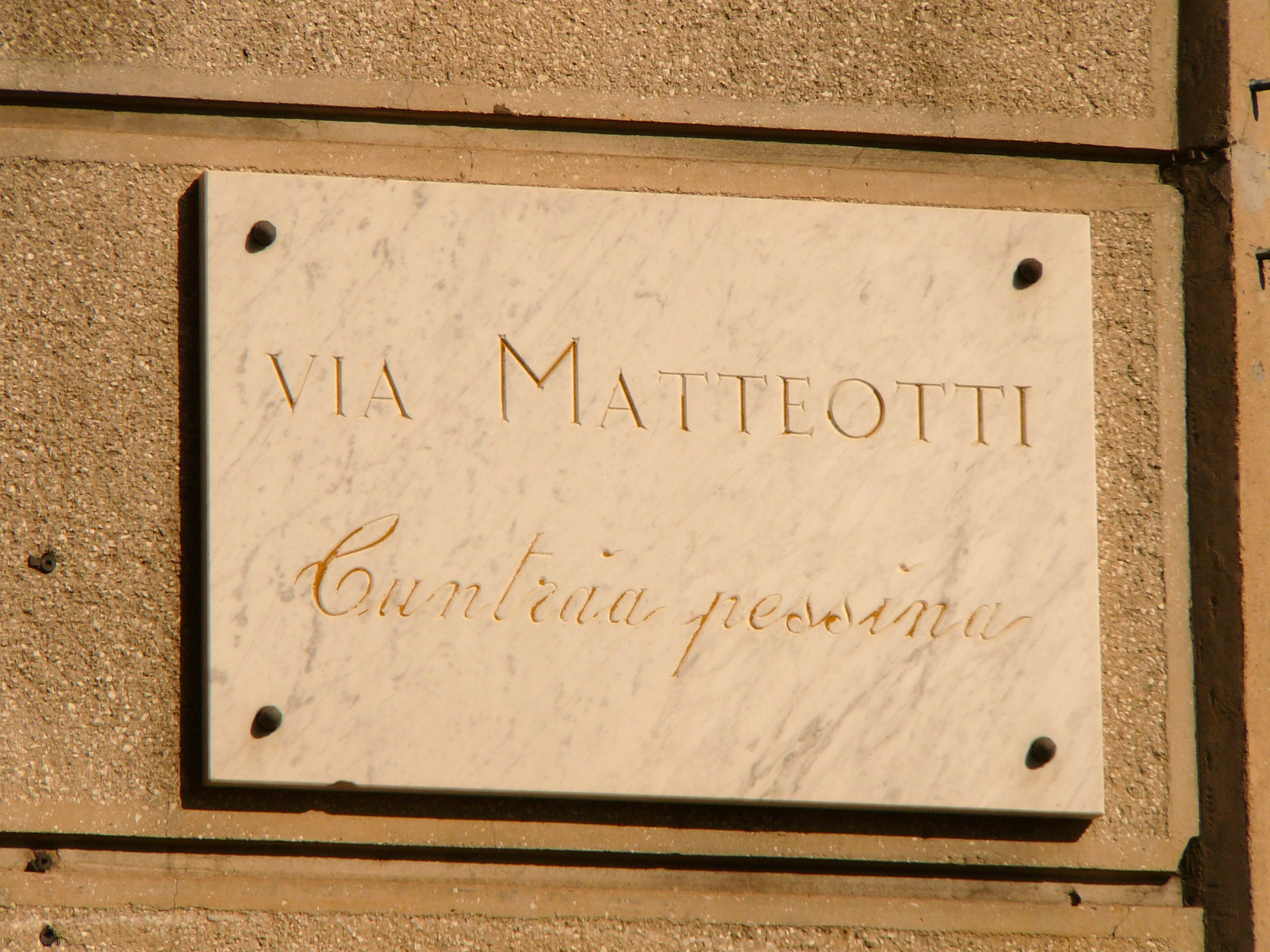
Plate bearing the name of Via Matteotti and its historical odonym (Cuntràa Pessina).

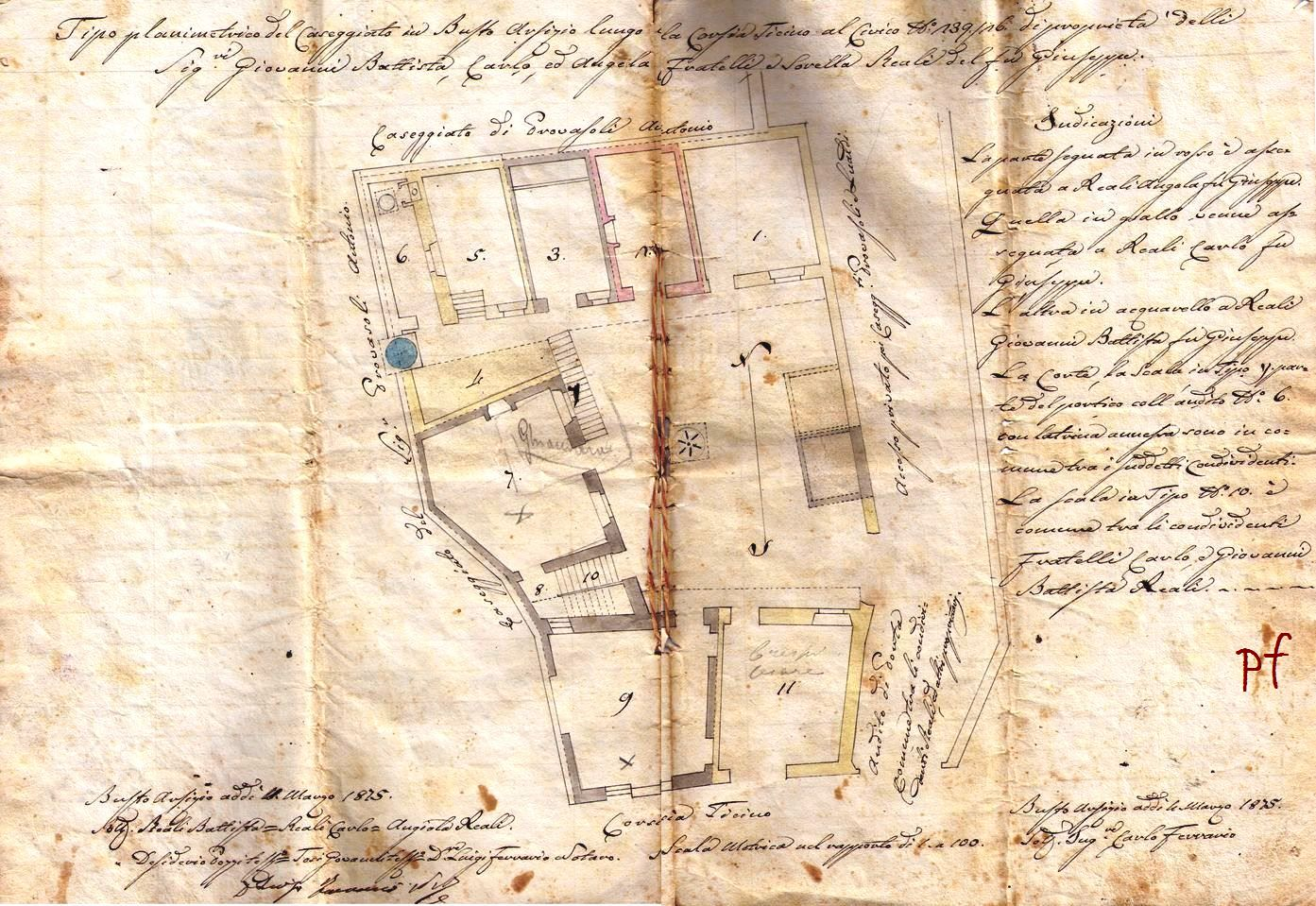
Survey document of a real estate division in the Ticino lane (the street name is visible below, under the plan).

==== Contrada Piscina (Cuntràa Pessina) ====
It was the western quarter of the town. The name derives from the basin used as a drinking trough for animals.

==== Contrada San Vico (Cuntràa Savìgu, or Savico, or Suico) ====
It was the northernmost contrada and owes its name to the fact that during the plague epidemic of 1524 it was the district least affected by the disease.

==== Contrada Sciornago (Cuntràa Sciornágu) ====
This was the southern contrada and the richest one.

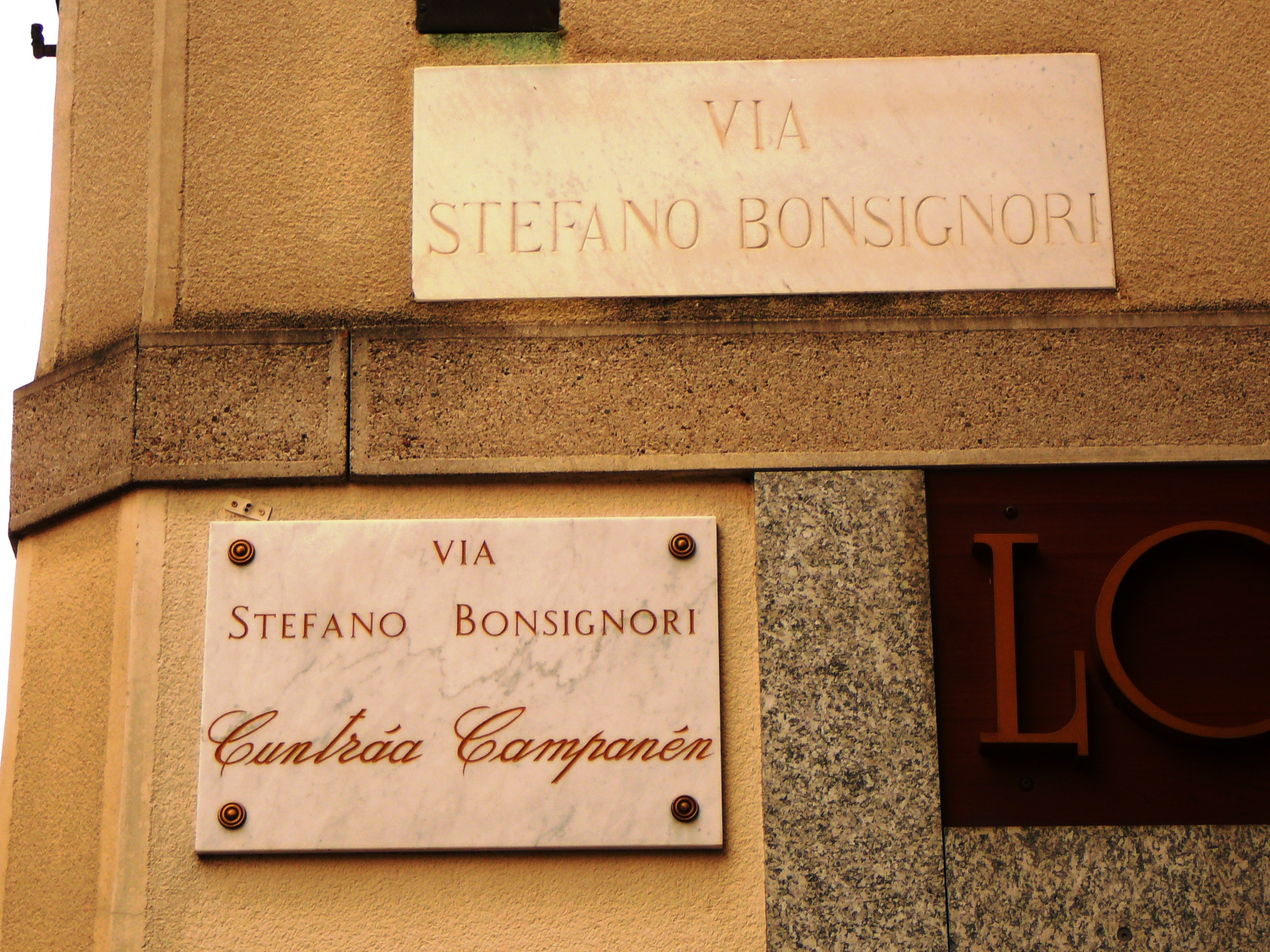
Plaque bearing the name of the street Stefano Bosnignori and its historical odonym (Cuntràa Campanén).

=== Streets and squares ===
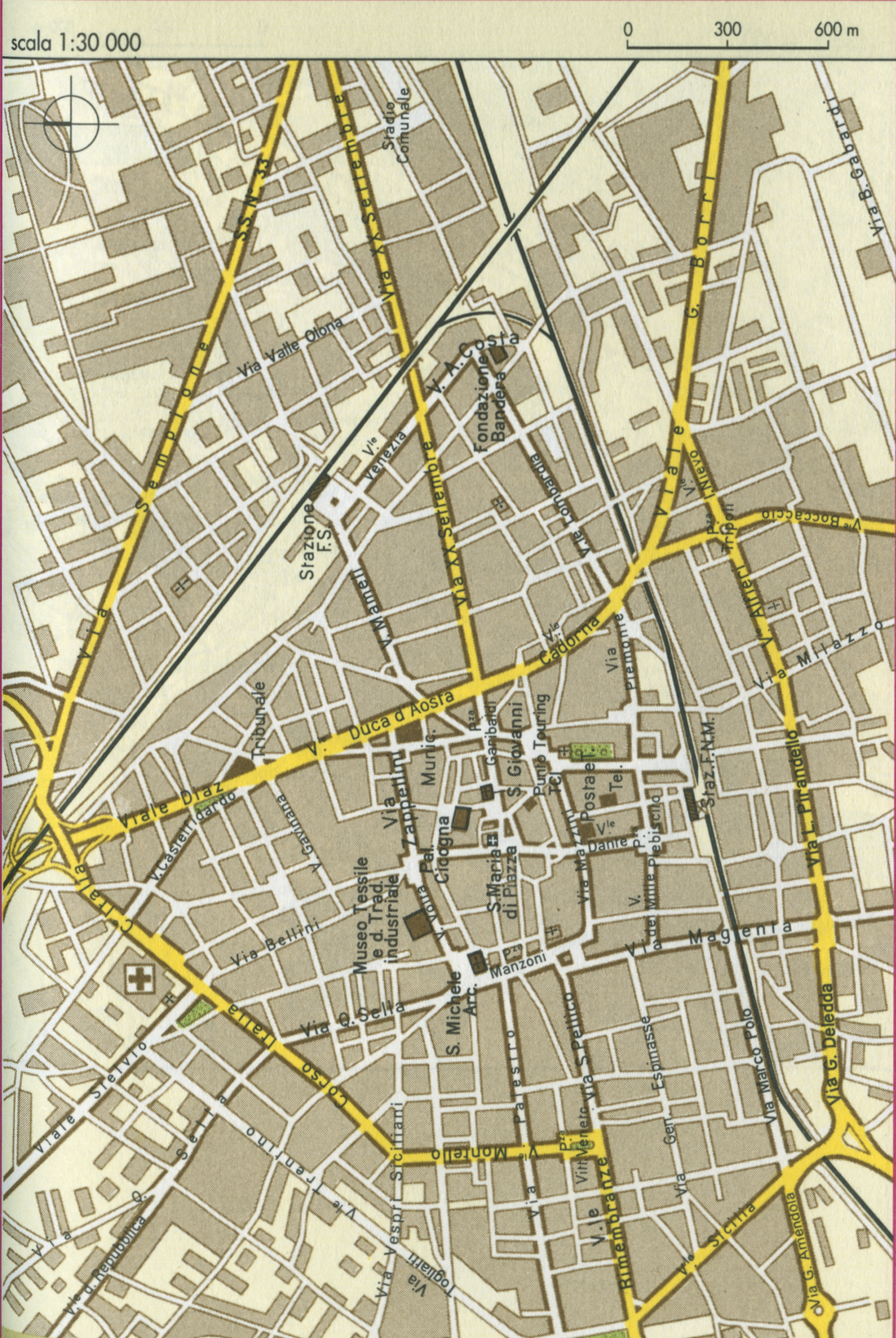
Map of Busto Arsizio

==== Strada di Sant'Alò ====
The name of the municipal road known as Strada di S. Alò is found in the 1857 Land Register and corresponds to the current Via Federico Confalonieri, which runs westwards from Piazza Alessandro Manzoni. Previously, in the Teresian Cadastre, the street was called Via Vernaschela because of the crossroads, later removed, with Strada Vernasca, while the name of Sant'Alò is due to the presence of a chapel dedicated to the patron saint of goldsmiths, blacksmiths and farriers, demolished in 1914. The current name of Via Federico Confalonieri dates back to 1906.

==== Piazza dell'Asilo ====
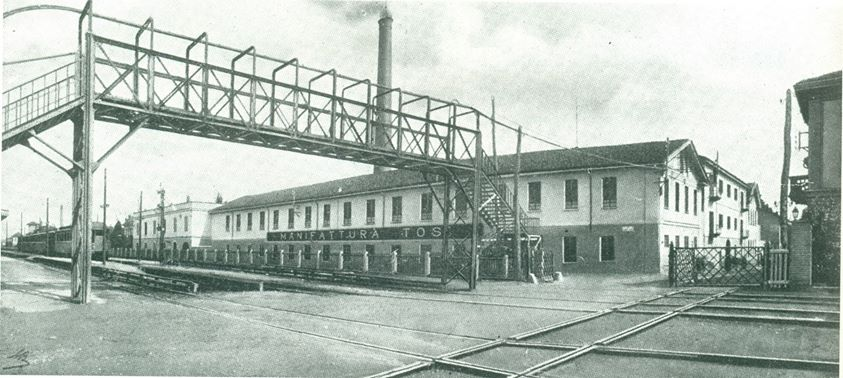
The level crossing along 20 September street: here the Strà Balòn, the Domodossola-Milan railway and the Milan-Gallarate tramway crossed.

==== Strà Balòn ====
As early as the 13th century, there is evidence of the existence of a Via de Bollono that ran from the Porta Basilica meadow to the Cairora farmstead, in the direction of today's Corso Sempione. The toponym does not appear in the Libro della decima (Book of the tithe) of 1399, probably because, as Pietro Antonio Crespi Castoldi reports, not all the houses in the village were subject to the tithe, particularly those located along this road axis. The name Via Bollono was retained until the 17th century and continued as far as Buon Gesù. The route of the road is delineated both in the Teresian Cadastre, where it appears with the name Via Ballone, and in that of 1857, where it takes the name of municipal road from Busto to Buon Gesù. In dialect, however, the road was called Strà Balòn, taking up the older name. The road continued to be called Strada Ballona until the early 20th century. With the first layout of the Ferrovia Mediterranea (Mediterranean Railway) the road was affected by the crossing of the tracks with its level crossing where it now crosses Viale della Gloria; from 1881 the Milan-Gallarate tramway also ran along the road. From the first decade of the 21st century, the street assumed its current name of Corso XX Settembre.

==== Contrada di San Barnaba ====
This name is found in the land register of 1857 to indicate the current Via Roma, which runs from east to west south of the historic centre of Busto Arsizio, and Via San Gregorio, which runs north from the eastern end of Via Roma to Via Milano. The route of this road is found in the Teresian Cadastre and traced the inner course of the southern moat of the town (which was located along today's Via Giuseppe Mazzini). The historian Pietro Antonio Crespi Castoldi, speaking of the minor quarters of the Basilica district, reports that one of these is the Contrada Palearia, which probably coincided with the present Via Roma - Via San Gregorio route. The name Palearia can be traced back to straw (perhaps to houses with straw roofs) or to a Cascina Paleata (straw farmstead), but it could also take its name from the De Palaris family, present in Busto in the 14th century. In the 18th century, Canon Petazzi reported a district called Paiè, which was travelled by processions to reach the church of San Gregorio, probably due to the dialectal contraction of Palearia into Paiè. In the Land Register of 1857, the street, limited to the section corresponding to today's Via Roma, is given the odonym of Contrada di San Barnaba, and the name, according to Enrico Crespi, is due to a chapel demolished in 1862 that featured a depiction of St Barnabas. The current name of Via Roma dates back to the time when the Capitoline city became capital of the Kingdom of Italy (20 September 1870).

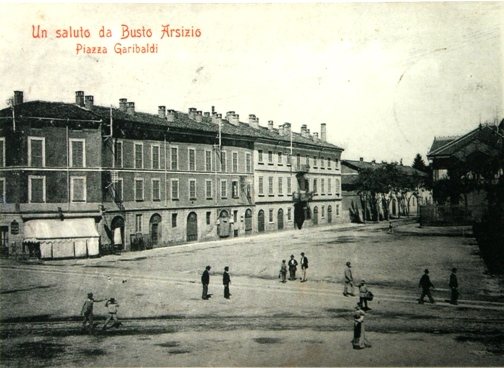
Piazza Giuseppe Garibaldi in 1910.

==== Prato di Basilica (Pratum de Baxilica) or Prato di Porta Milano ====
Located outside the ancient town, it partially corresponded to today's Piazza Giuseppe Garibaldi. It owes its name to the district of the same name that led here. Already mentioned in the Libro della Decima of 1399, this meadow was overlooked by the Porta Basilica, the eastern entrance to the village, restored in 1613 by Count Luigi Marliani, then again in 1727 by Carlo Marliani and finally demolished in 1861. In the 1857 cadastre, the name of the area is Prato di Porta Milano (in fact, the road leading to Simplon and then to Milan was accessed through this gate). At the end of 1860, for the celebrations of the feat of the Thousand, the square was named after Giuseppe Garibaldi.

==== Cuntràa di beché ====
This was the street, still in existence, that ran westwards from Piazza Santa Maria. It owes its name to the presence, in the square, of the ‘beccaria’, a porticoed building used for butchering meat. Its name changed several times over time: first to Contrada del Mercato, from 1876 to Via Alessandro Manzoni and from 1905 to Via Felice Cavallotti, the name it still has today. From 1939 until the end of World War II it took the name Via Addis Ababa.

==== Strà Brüghetu ====
This is the name that once identified the present-day via Luciano Manara, which runs southwards from Piazza Trento e Trieste, south-east of the city centre, to Via Ludovico Ariosto. Present in the Teresian Cadastre and in the Cadastre of 1857 (where the road is called the municipal road of Brughetto), the road connected (and still connects through today's Via Milazzo) the centre of Busto to the Brughetto farmstead.

==== Strada di circonvallazione ====
It coincides with today's Via Giuseppe Mazzini and is the road that runs south along the historic centre of Busto Arsizio, following the southern development of the embankment and moat that defended the town. Clearly delineated in the Teresian Cadastre, in that of 1857 it assumed the name of ring road, which later became the San Gregorio ring road due to the presence, to the east, of the church of San Gregorio Magno in Camposanto. The current naming after Giuseppe Mazzini dates back to 1906.

Among the former ring roads was also the present Via Andrea Zappellini, located in the north-eastern part of the ancient village. In the Teresian Cadastre, the layout of this street is very irregular and it connected Prato Savico to the Church of the Beata Vergine delle Grazie. The layout of the street is preserved in the 1857 Land Register, where it appears as a ring road, which also included today's Via Alessandro Volta. In 1876 it was called the Re Magi ring road (a name derived from the one popularly attributed to the Porta Savico, a name it retained until the early 20th century. From 1910 the street took its current name of Andrea Zappellini.

==== Contrada della colombaia ====
On today's Via Carlo Tosi, in the district of San Michele, a turret still stands, which gave its name to the street, belonging to Casa Tosi, where pigeons were bred in the past, as in similar structures in the area. The name of Via della Colombaia was preserved until the early 20th century, but the current name of Via Carlo Tosi can be found in the 1910 toponymy.

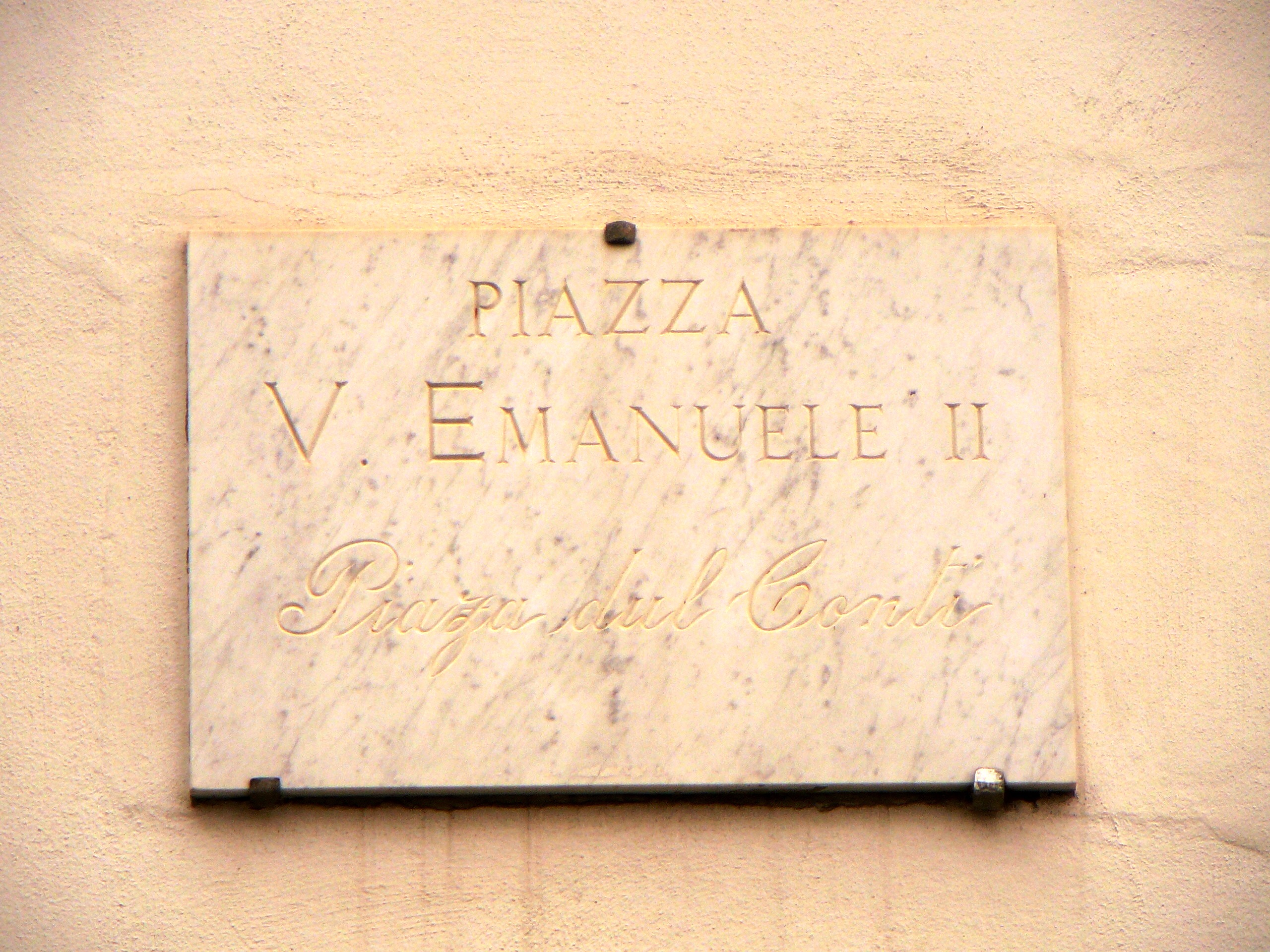
Plaque bearing the name of Piazza Vittorio Emanuele II and its historical odonym (Piaza dul Conti).

==== Piazza del Conte (Piaza dul Conti) ====
This is today's Piazza Vittorio Emanuele II. It owes its name to the presence of the still existing Marliani-Cicogna Palace, once the residence of the Counts of Busto Arsizio of the Marliani family.

==== Vicolo della costa ====
This was an alley that opened southwards at the south-western corner of Piazza San Giovanni Battista, present in the Teresian Cadastre and referred to as Vicolo della costa in the 1857 Cadastre. Luigi Ferrario in 1864 also mentions this name. The name remained unchanged until the beginning of the 20th century, but in the toponymy of 1910 the name Vicolo Rauli (Rauli Alley) can be found, from the name of an ancient Bustese family. The 1930 partial town-planning scheme provided for the opening of a street between Piazza San Giovanni and Via Ugo Foscolo, opening up Vicolo Rauli, implemented in 1932 with the odonym of Via Cardinale Eugenio Tosi.

==== Contrada dietro le case ====
It corresponds to today's Via Antonio Pozzi and is found in the 1857 Cadastre as the result of the levelling of the moat and the defensive embankment of the village. It runs parallel to the Contrada dei Ratti and in the second half of the 19th century was known as Via dei Giardini and connected to Via dell'Ospedale. The current dedication to the priest Antonio Pozzi dates back to the early 20th century.

==== Vicolo Fassi ====
This is the current Vicolo Purificazione (Purification Alley), which runs southwards for about 30 metres from Via San Michele in the centre. Its route can be found in the Teresian Cadastre, then in the one of 1857 under the name Vicolo Fassi, the surname of a Bustese family that, as noted by Luigi Ferrario in 1864, had properties in the town, probably some near this alley.

==== Piazza della Fiera ====
It corresponds to today's Piazza Alessandro Manzoni and its origin dates back to the 17th century following the levelling of the embankment that surrounded the village of Busto Arsizio to the west. It rises in correspondence with the town gates of Sciornago and Pessina and until 1876 was indicated on maps as Prato Pessina (in the Book of Tithing of 1399 it was Pratum de Pessina), in continuity with the ancient name of the adjoining Piazza San Michele. The name Piazza della Fiera (Fair Square), documented since 1876, derives from the presence in this square of the cattle market, a veritable fair especially on the occasion of the feast of St Roch, which was celebrated with the blessing of the cattle at the nearby church of St Roch. The current dedication of the square to Alessandro Manzoni dates back to 1906.

==== Contrada di San Filippo ====
The toponym is found in the 1857 Land Registry to indicate the route of the present-day Via Giuseppe Tettamanti, which runs northwards from Piazza San Giovanni Battista, already present in the Teresian Cadastre. Between 1749 and 1751, the rectory of San Giovanni was demolished and the baptistery of San Filippo Neri, which gave the district its name, was built in its place. In the early 20th century, the street was given the odonym of Via Prepositurale, but already in 1910 the current name of Via Monsignor Giuseppe Tettamanti appeared.

==== Contrada della Finanza (Cuntràa daa Finanza) ====
Corresponding to today's Via Camillo Benso Conte di Cavour, joining the southern sides of Piazza Santa Maria and Piazza San Giovanni, it was so called because of the presence of the tax and revenue office during the Austrian rule. The current name appeared at the beginning of the 20th century.

==== Strà Garlasca (or Galarasca) ====
It was the road that connected Busto Arsizio to Arnate (today a district of Gallarate), corresponding to today's Via Gioacchino Rossini and its continuation of Via Gaetano Donizetti, which leads into Piazza Alessandro Manzoni, together with Via Quintino Sella, at the church of the Madonna in Prato. The name Garlasca is already found in 1399 in the Libro della Decima (Book of the Tithe) and also appears again in the Cadastre of 1857. In the topography of the late 19th century, it is found with the name of Galarasca local road, while from the beginning of the 20th century the current names of Via Gaetano Donizetti, for the first short stretch near the town centre, and Via Gioaccino Rossini appear.

==== Strà Garotola ====
This is the ancient odonym of today's Via Goffredo Mameli, which today connects Piazza Giuseppe Garibaldi with Busto Arsizio station. The name Strà Garotola can be traced back to the 1920s and derives from the word garro, meaning ‘stony river bed’. It was the road that led from the meadow of Porta Basilica to the banks of the Olona river, precisely to the mill of the same name (where during the plague the clothes of the sick were washed).

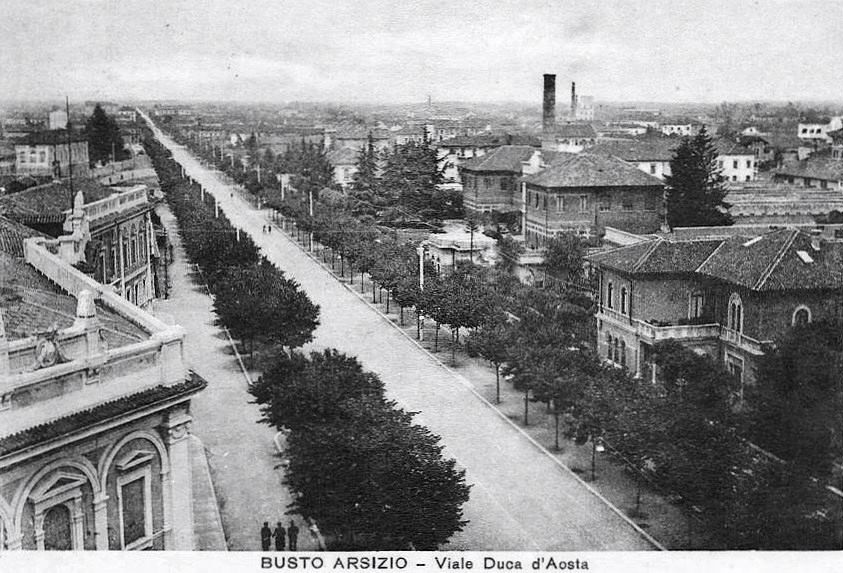
Viale della Gloria in the 1940s.

==== Viale della Gloria ====
This was the name of the avenue that today connects the Cinque Ponti area to the north-western part of the municipality of Castellanza. Since 1860, the layout of Viale della Gloria was occupied by the tracks of the Domodossola-Milan railway and the old station, now demolished.

==== Piazza Grande ====
This is today's Piazza Carlo Noè, overlooked by the south side of the old church of Santi Apostoli Pietro e Paolo of Sacconago. The name Piazza Grande dates back to 1857, when Sacconago was an autonomous municipality and this square was the largest in the town (the new church was inaugurated in 1932). In the first decade of the 20th century, the square was named after Victor Emmanuel II, but in 1931, three years after the annexation of Sacconago to Busto Arsizio, to avoid homonymy with the old Piazza del Conte in the centre of Busto, the odonym became Piazza Umberto Biancamano, founder of the Savoy family. In 1944 it assumed its current name of Piazza Carlo Noè.

Piazza Grande was also the ancient toponym in the 1857 cadastre of the current Piazza Pietro Toselli in the centre of Borsano, now a district of Busto Arsizio, but an autonomous municipality until 1928. Like the square of the same name in Sacconago, in 1931 the square, previously named after Vittorio Emanuele II, was dedicated to Emanuele Filiberto. The current name dates from 1944.

==== Prato di San Gregorio ====
This was the name given to the open space in front of the church of San Gregorio Magno in Camposanto, which occupied the south-western part of what is now Piazza Trento e Trieste, outside the south-eastern end of the ancient fortifications. This clearing was present in the Teresian Cadastre, while the remaining part of Piazza Trento e Trieste was occupied by fields. In the 1857 Cadastre, the current layout is outlined, with the entire square already fronted by real estate; Luigi Ferrario named it Piazza di San Gregorio. In the meantime, the vestry board of San Giovanni had purchased a piece of land in the Cassina Scerina near the church of San Gregorio and began the construction of an oratory and the opening of a kindergarten named after Saint Anne with the entrance facing the meadow of San Gregorio, which began its activity in 1860. Between 1859 and 1861, today's Piazza Trento e Trieste was named after Camillo Benso, Count of Cavour, a name that remained until 1896, when a street in the historic centre was named after Cavour. Regardless of the official toponymy, at least since 1860 the square was commonly referred to as Piazza dell'Asilo, and this name persisted until the early 20th century. In 1909, the square assumed its current name of Piazza Trento e Trieste. Carlo Azimonti reports another popular denomination of the square, namely Prà Furnè, which is explained by the presence on the square of the Cantoni bakery in Prà Asìli.

==== Strada in Longù ====
This was a road located west of Sacconago and connected this village to Ferno and Lonate Pozzolo. It owes its name to the Latin word longorius, meaning ‘long pole’, as it probably crossed woods whose trees were used to make poles.

==== Vicolo Lupi ====
This alley owes its name to the De Lupis family, whose presence is attested in Busto Arsizio from the 13th century. Later, some branches of the family vulgarised the surname to Lualdi. The street took its current name of Vicolo Clerici after the 19th century (it is still cited as Vicolo Lupi in the 1857 Land Register).

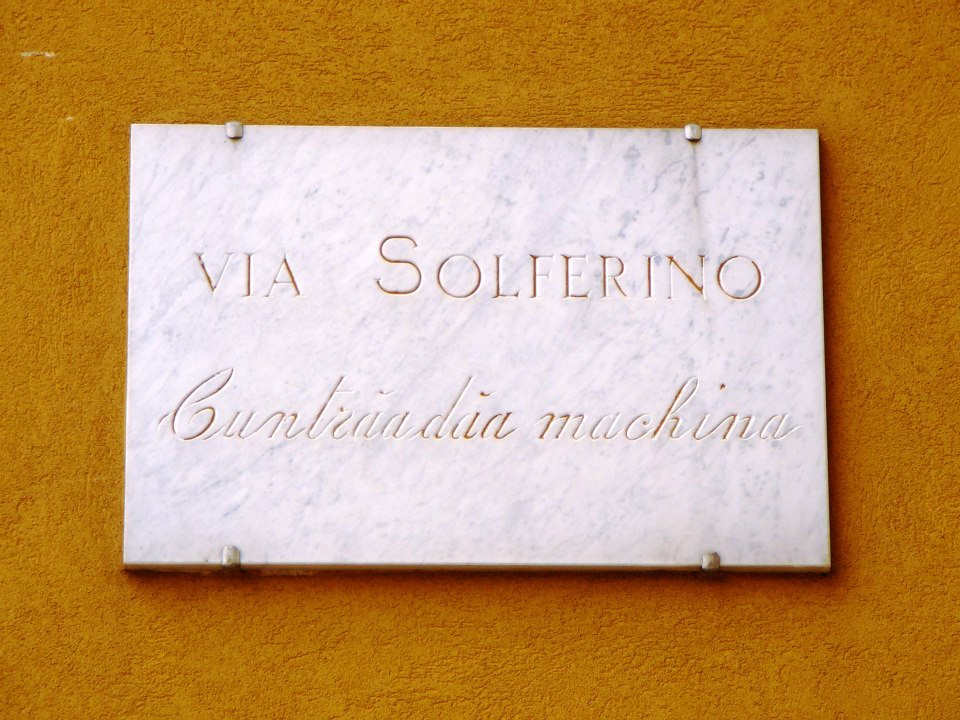
Plaque bearing the name of Via Solferino and its historical odonym (Cuntràa dàa machina).

==== Contrada della macchina (Cuntràa dàa machina) ====
Corresponding to today's Via Solferino, which connects Via Montebello and Piazza San Giovanni, it was so named in 1857 by the surveyors in charge of surveying the centre of Busto Arsizio for the creation of the new Cadastre. The choice of this name derives from the presence of a hydraulic machine, commissioned by the municipal administration around 1750 to combat the risk of fires (which were particularly frequent due to the large number of wooden buildings and flammable materials such as cotton and grain, and were difficult to extinguish due to the dryness of the ground and the great depth of the wells). This machine, operated by hand and possibly later by steam, which was located in one of the buildings overlooking this street, lost its usefulness in 1897, when the new municipal aqueduct designed by Eugenio Villoresi was inaugurated.

==== Contrada del mangano (Cuntràa dul màngan) ====
This was the street corresponding to today's Via Paolo Camillo Marliani, connecting Piazza Vittorio Emanuele II to Via Montebello. The mangle, from which it takes its name, was the machine used to roll and press fabrics.

==== Vicolo Marchesi ====
This is today's Vicolo Gambarana, in the south-western part of the historical centre. The route is present in the Teresian Cadastre and the name Vicolo Marchesi is found in the 1857 Cadastre: it derives from the Marchesi, who held municipal and ecclesiastical offices in Busto Arsizio in the 18th century. The current dedication to Giuseppe Gambarana of Pavia, the last feudal lord of Busto who succeeded Camillo Marliani in 1780, is found in the 1910 topographic maps. Today, the original route has disappeared, replaced by car parks, but the odonym has been preserved in the road bordering the parking area to the south and east.

==== Prato Pessina (later Prato di San Michele) ====
An uncultivated piece of land outside the ancient hamlet, where today the Piazza San Michele is located. Like the Contrada Pessina, the name derives from the basin used as a drinking trough for animals that stood in Piazza Santa Maria. Traces of this toponym remain in the name of the church of the Madonna in Prato, a religious building that was built near the said meadow.

==== Strada comunale detta Pobbia ====
It roughly coincided with today's Via Arnaldo da Brescia, built following the 1911 Master Plan that provided for the construction of the new hospital in the northern area of Busto Arsizio. The ancient odonym is found in the Land Registry of 1857 and owes its origin to the toponym Pobega, already present in the Libro della Decima of 1399, which derives from the Lombard word pobia, meaning ‘poplar’. In the 1930s, it was given its current name.

==== Contrada dei Prandoni ====
The route of this road, already present in the Teresian Cadastre, corresponds to today's Via XXII Marzo, between Via Giacomo Matteotti and Corso Europa, in the old town centre. In the 1857 Land Register there is the odonym Contrada dei Prandoni, confirmed by Luigi Ferrario in 1864 and preserved until the beginning of the 20th century. The name derives from the Prandoni (De Prandonis) family, of Milanese origin and traceable in Busto Arsizio around the 16th century. From this street, which assumed its current name of Via XXII Marzo in 1906, originated Vicolo Provasoli, which became the private property of Cinema Oscar in 1955.

==== Stradone Tosi ====
This is a short street that runs alongside the Villa Ottolini-Tovaglieri, on the north-western edge of the ancient village. The street is recorded in the Teresian Cadastre and in the 1857 Cadastre it is called Stradone Tosi as it joins Via San Michele at Casa Tosi. From 1906 its name changed to Via Madonna del Monte as a reference to the Sacro Monte of Varese, and with a resolution of the City Council on 26 June 1964 the name became Via Emilio Parona.

==== Piazza Pretura Vecchia ====
It corresponds to the current intersection of Via Roma and Via Bramante and kept the name of Piazza della Pretura Vecchia until 1910, when the offices of the Magistrate's Court moved to Palazzo Marliani-Cicogna, and the square became Piazza Bramante, the name that remains of the street that goes from Piazza Santa Maria to Via Roma.

==== Strada alla cascina Provasoli ====
It corresponds to today's Via Goito, which runs westwards from the north side of Piazza Alessandro Manzoni, just outside the city centre. With the route already present in the Teresian Cadastre, this country road appears with the name of consortium road to the Provasoli farmstead in the 1857 Cadastre. It later assumed the name of Strada della Marchesina, from the farmstead of the same name, listed by Luigi Ferrario in 1864. In 1906, the current odonym of Via Goito was given.

==== Contrada dei Ratti ====
Its route is now traced by Via Giosuè Carducci and Via Giovanni Battista Bossi, north-east of the basilica of San Giovanni Battista. Contrada dei Ratti is mentioned in the 17th century by Pietro Antonio Crespi Castoldi and is found in the Teresian Cadastre. Its development as a road is also recorded in the 1857 Cadastre. With the building of the Carducci schools (1899-1907), the street was named Via delle scuole, becoming Via Gaudenzio Ferrari before 1910. In the 1920s the street took its current names of Via Giosuè Carducci and Via Giovanni Battista Bossi. The ancient name probably derives from the fact that the area was located to the north of the village and perhaps because at this point the defensive embankment, located about 50 metres to the north, was higher than in other areas of the perimeter of the built-up area (from ‘ratto’, an adjective that in archaic Italian means steep).

==== Vicolo Reguzzoni ====
Corresponding to today's Vicolo Crocefisso, and present as a route in the Teresian Cadastre, the name Vicolo Reguzzoni can be found in the 1857 Cadastre. It can be entered from Via San Michele in the historic centre of Busto Arsizio and today leads to a car park at the other end of which is Vicolo San Carlo Borromeo. The name derives from that of the Regizonus (Reguzzoni) family, a wealthy family in Busto Arsizio since the 14th century. Throughout the 19th century, the street retained its ancient name, but in 1906 it was given its current name of Via Crocefisso, probably derived from a fresco depicting the Crucifixion of Jesus placed in the short stretch and now disappeared.

==== Contrada del Riale (or Reale or delle Monache) ====
Today's Via Bambaia, located a few metres south of Piazza Santa Maria, corresponds to part of the route of the ancient Contrada del Riale, as visible in the 1857 Cadastre. The name Riale is mentioned in 1864 by the chronicler Luigi Ferrario, while in the cadastre it appears as Reale, which may be a mistranscription. The name derives from the dialect word Riáa (brook, as also shown by the variant of the name of the stream Rile that flows north of Busto Arsizio) because the overflowing waters of the pool located in Piazza Santa Maria flowed through this street before it was covered in 1631. The popular name of the street was instead Contrada delle Monache because of the presence of a monastery of Augustinian nuns. In 1910 the street was given its current name and after 1930, following the opening of Via Bramante, it was reduced to just the final stretch joining Via Bramante and Via Roma.

==== Contrada San Rocco (later corsia di Porta Novara, then via Novara) ====
Its route corresponds to today's Via Giuseppe Lualdi, which from Piazza Alessandro Manzoni connects with Via Carlo Porta and Via Felice Cavallotti and then enters Piazza Santa Maria. These three streets previously constituted the Contrada Sciornago. The name Contrada San Rocco appears in the 17th century due to the presence of the church of San Rocco. This name is found in the 1857 Land Registry, while Luigi Ferrario in 1864 called it Porta Novara lane known as Sciornago (the Novara gate, formerly known as Sciornago gate, was located where the street crosses Piazza Manzoni today). At the beginning of the 20th century, it changed its name to Via Novara, but in the 1903 topography it already has the current name of Via Giuseppe Lualdi. In addition to the church of San Rocco, the Bossi house stands here.

==== Via Roncora ====
This street faithfully corresponds to today's route of Via Vespri Siciliani, which runs west from the centre of Busto to Veroncora. The road is already mentioned in the Libro della decima of 1399 and is found in the Teresian Cadastre and in the one of 1857 with the name of consortium road known as alla Madonna in Veroncora, from the church of Madonna in Veroncora located on the western edge of the road's route. Around 1920 the current name of Via Vespri Siciliani appeared.

==== Via Sachonasca (later via de Saconago and via Sainasca) ====
Corresponding to today's Via Magenta, it is the street that connects the centre of Busto Arsizio to the districts of Sacconago (from which it derives its name) and Borsano, formerly autonomous municipalities, and was the continuation of Strà Garlasca (today's Via Donizetti and Via Rossini). The road is documented as early as the 14th century and retained its name until the 17th century. The route is found in the Teresian Cadastre and in the 1857 Cadastre it has the name of municipal road known as the road to Sacconago. The current name of Via Magenta appeared as early as the end of the 19th century, limited to the first section up to the level crossing at the intersection with the Novara-Seregno railway, but before 1930 it was extended to the entire route. The odonym of Via Magenta is given by the fact that travelling south along the road it is possible to reach Dairago, Arconate, Inveruno and then Magenta.

==== Via Samariti (or Via Sammarita) ====
Its route corresponds to present-day Via Mentana and Via Luigi Maino, which run northward from Piazza Cristoforo Colombo (Prato Savico) to Corso Italia, in front of the hospital. The term sammariti, which appears as the name of the street in the Book of Tithing of 1399, is a dialect contraction of “Santa Maria”: it is therefore likely that the street was named after the shrine of Santa Maria di Piazza, which can be reached from Prato Savico by taking the present-day Via Montebello, a natural continuation of Via Samariti. In the Land Register of 1857 is found the name Strada detta Sammarita, but already at the end of the 19th century the street assumed its present name of Via Mentana (later, in 1927, the part of the street that goes from the hospital to Piazza 25 Aprile assumed its present name of Via Luigi Maino).

==== Via dei sassi ====
This street was located outside the ancient village and led, going north, to the Simplon road. The odonym still survives in the northernmost section of the street, which runs from Simplon to today's Viale Stelvio, while the southernmost section coincides with today's Via Marmolada and Via Luigi Galvani. The name is due to the fact that where the road used to stand ran the detour, laid out in the 16th century, of the Tenore stream, which, once it dried up due to lack of water, left a stony ground that was used as a road.

==== Strada ad senterium ====
The route of this road, already mentioned under the name ad senterium in the Book of the Tithing of 1399, corresponds for its southern part to today's Salvator Rosa Street, which from Vespri Siciliani Street (then Roncora Street), runs northwest, holding a median route between it and Strà Garlasca. In the 17th century it retained the toponym of sentiero and was mentioned by Pietro Antonio Crespi Castoldi. Present in the Teresian Cadastre, in that of 1857 it has the denomination of municipal road known as the pathway that from Busto Arsizio leads to Verghera, popularly called santé d'á Verghera (Verghera is today a district of the municipality of Samarate). From 1920 the southern section of the road assumed its current name of Via Salvator Rosa, while later the northern section, which goes all the way to the border in the woods of Verghera, was named Via Tommaso Rodari.

==== Strada Strapera ====
Its route, corresponding to today's Via Luigi Settembrini south of Sacconago, was already outlined in the Teresian Cadastre, and in the 1857 cadastre it has the name of strada comunale della strapera. This term indicates poorly fertile moorland, and south of this road there was also a Strapera farmstead in the 19th century; the term is derived from sterpera, meaning “site of brushwood.” In 1910 the first section (the northern one) of the street was named Via Alessandro Manzoni, and the next section became the local road known as strapera gesiolo because of the presence of a religious landmark near the route, but also to distinguish it from another Via Strapera, located a little further north and which retains the toponym to this day. The designation of Via Luigi Settembrini for both stretches dates back to a resolution of the prefectural commissioner in 1931.

==== Strada Polenta ====
Its route corresponds to that of today's Via Spluga, which connects Via Quintino Sella and Viale Stelvio between the neighborhoods of San Giuseppe and Beata Giuliana, north of the city center, and then bends west to today's Via Aprica. This route can be found in the Teresian Cadastre and the 1857 cadastre. Until the first decades of the 20th century, the street was called a local road known as polenta, a term that, given the antiquity of the country road, is to be considered an assonance of the toponym present since the 12th century in the Bustese territory porenca or polenca, widespread in the Lombard area and derived from the proper name Pollencus.

==== Via Vernasca ====
This is the road that from Prato Pessina went westward in the direction of Samarate. Its first section corresponds to present-day Via Silvio Pellico and Via Rimembranze, which connect the center to the monumental cemetery of Busto Arsizio, and then continued along present-day Via Lonate Pozzolo. In the Book of Tithing of 1399 it was mentioned as the Raconasca, probably due to the fact that to the west, outside the territory of Busto, it incorporates the road leading from Gallarate to Arconate and then to Inveruno and Magenta (Arconate by metathesis becomes Raconate). In the 17th century the name Via Vernasca appears, probably due to the prevalence of the toponym of Inveruno instead of Arconate (from the Latin toponym Everunum → Everuno and the adjective Everunasca, later contracted into Vernasca). In the Land Register of 1857 the road has the name Via Lonate Pozzolo (which it still retains for the stretch from the cemetery to the eastern border of Busto Arsizio). The current naming of the first section after Silvio Pellico dates back to the beginning of the 20th century, and since 1927 this designation has been limited to the western section only, while the eastern section up to the cemetery has become Viale Rimembranze.

==== Strada vicinale del Viazzone ====
Corresponds to present-day Via Bizzozzero and Via Forlanini, which, near the hospital, connect Via Quintino Sella and Via Arnaldo da Brescia. It is found in the cadastre of 1857.

==== Prato San Vico (or Prato Savico or Prà dei Remagi, later Prà d'a pesa) ====
It corresponds to today's Piazza Cristoforo Colombo and is located just outside the ancient defensive embankment north of the historic center of Busto Arsizio, where the city gate of the same name once stood. It was also popularly known as Prà dei Remagi, because of a legend related precisely to the gate that stood there, remembered in a high relief, placed there in 1997, depicting the Magi. The name then changed to Prà d'a pesa (meadow of the weighbridge) until 1901, when it assumed its current name of Christopher Columbus Square.

=== Other vanished toponyms ===
==== Selva lunga (Selva longa) ====
This was a wooded area located between Busto Arsizio and nearby Gallarate crossed by today's Corso Sempione. Luigi Ferrario reports of a trial held on November 5, 1620 brought by the vicar of Seprio against the owners of these lands, who had not complied with the order imposed by the secret council of the village to clean up the area to limit the frequent murders and robberies.

=== Streets and squares ===
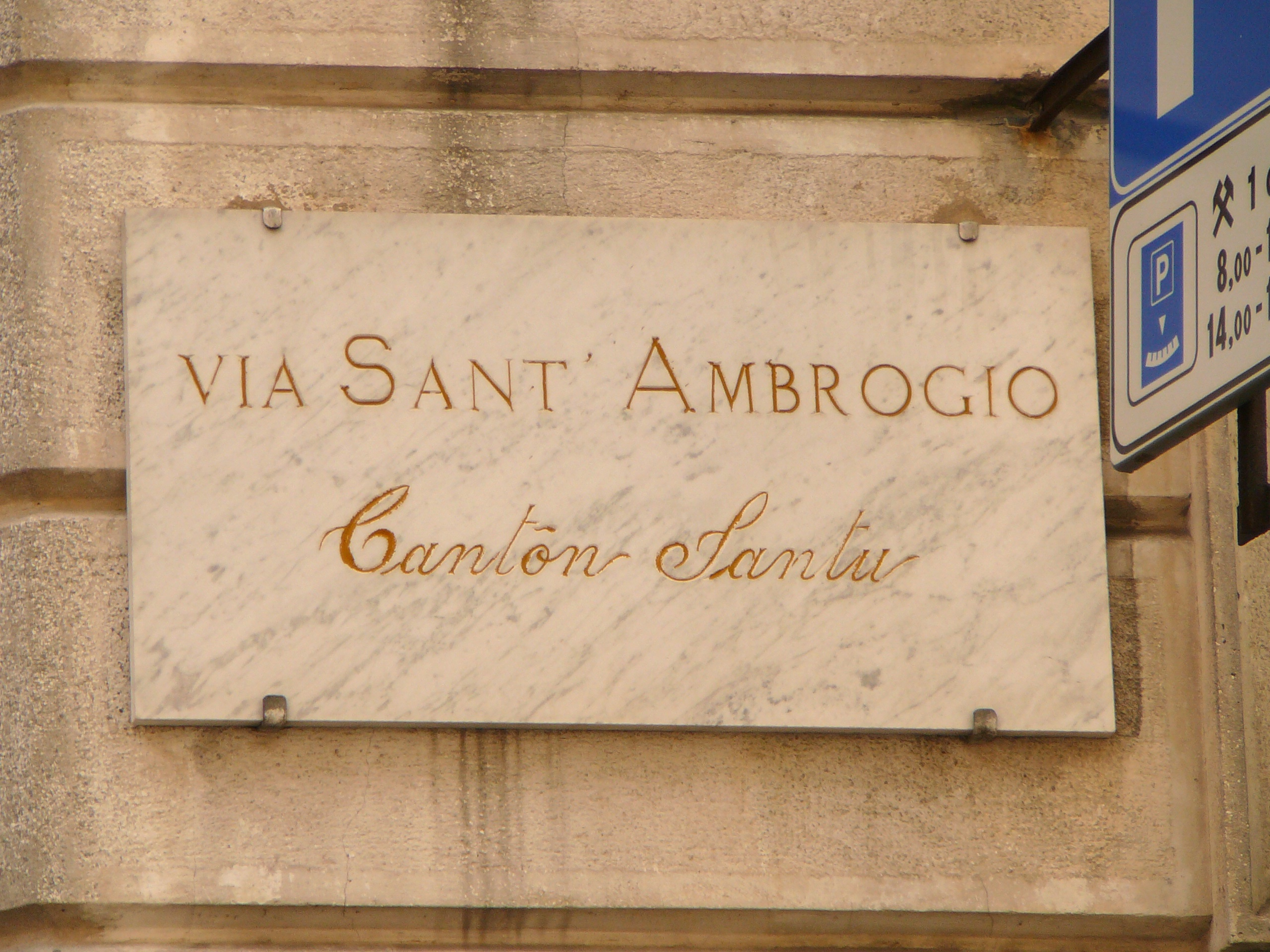
Plaque bearing the name of Sant'Ambrogio Street and its historical odonym (Cantòn Santu).

==== Via Sant'Ambrogio (formerly Cantòn Santu) ====
It is located in the historic center, a few steps from the central Piazza Santa Maria. It is a side street of Via Bramante that takes its name from the chapel of Sant'Ambrogio in Canton Santo, a building that stood there until the 1930s, when it was demolished to rectify Via Bramante.

==== Via Baraggioli ====
The street is located in the southern part of the district of Sacconago, once an autonomous municipality. It is part of the ancient municipal road known as the old one to Borsano, already present in the Teresian Cadastre. It owes its name to the dialect word baragia meaning “barren land.”

==== Via Bellingera ====
Located east, just outside the historic center, this street owes its name to the Bellingeri family, owners of the Bellingera Marinoni farmstead located, until the early 20th century, along this street.

==== Via Bonsignora ====
This street is already found in the Teresian Cadastre, while in the one of 1857 it is called a consortium road known as alla Bonsignora. It owes its name to the Bonsignori family, present in Busto Arsizio as early as the 14th century, and this was probably originally a farm road, given the presence along its route of the Bonsignori and Bonsciora farmsteads, which have now disappeared.

==== Vicolo San Carlo Borromeo (formerly vicolo Provasoli) ====
This is an enclosed alley (which today leads via a walkway to a parking lot) that opens from Via Giacomo Matteotti. The layout of the alley was present in the Teresian Cadastre and is also found in the 1857 Cadastre as Vicolo San Carlo. The chronicler Luigi Ferrario in 1864 mentions it as Via Provasoli. With a toponymic reordering in 1910 in a religious direction after the erection of the church of San Michele as a parish, it again assumed the name of San Carlo. In 1941, to avoid problems of homonymy with San Carlo street in Sacconago, the street became Vicolo San Carlo Borromeo.

==== Vicolo Borsa (formerly vicolo del colonnello) ====
This alley, which starts from Via Montebello just north of Piazza Santa Maria, is found in the Teresian Cadastre, while in the 1857 Cadastre it took the name Vicolo del Colonnello, probably due to the presence of an officer's residence. In 1910 it assumed its current name of Vicolo Borsa derived from the Borsa family, one of the oldest in Busto Arsizio, present in the village since the 13th century.

==== Via del Bosco ====
Located southeast of the historic center, it ends at the boundary with the municipality of Castellanza and the current route reflects the one visible in the Teresian Cadastre. The odonym dates back to 1931, but probably traces the previous popular name Boschessa, which also gives its name to the district. This name derives from the wooded area it passed through: in 1883 the presence of a farmstead, no longer extant, called the cascina del bosco on the extension of the road in the municipality of Castellanza is ascertained.

==== Via Ca' Bianca ====
This is the road from Castellanza, passing in front of the Carlo Speroni stadium, to the Domodossola-Milan railway detour, built in 1924, which split its route into two parts (of which the one towards the center of Busto Arsizio, after the level crossing was decommissioned, is now a private road). Its name derives from the presence along the street of a farmstead, visible in the land register of 1857 and now disappeared, with its exterior walls whitewashed in lime.

==== Vicolo Carlinetti ====
This is an unpaved alley that opens, in the middle of the historic center, from Via Giacomo Mattetotti. Its name comes from the nickname given to a branch of the Tosi family of Busto Arsizio. In the 1857 Land Register the name of the small street was Vicolo Tosi, but in 1941, to avoid homonyms with Carlo Tosi and Cardinal Eugenio Tosi streets, the odonym was changed to Vicolo Carlinetti.

==== Via delle Caserme ====
It runs from Via Giacomo Matteotti to Corso Europa in the historic center. The route is present in the Teresian Cadastre and in the 1857 Cadastre it appears with the name Vicolo delle Caserme, a name it kept until 1959 when, following a gutting, the alley became Via delle Caserme. In History of the plague that occurred in the village of Busto Arsizio 1630 the author states that, at the beginning of the plague wave that hit Busto Arsizio in 1630, the infected were sent to the case herme, lodgings for soldiers passing through the village that probably stood near this street.

==== Via del Chisso ====
The toponym is already found in the Book of Tithing of 1399 in the Latin form in clauxo, and this denomination was maintained until the 17th century. In the Land Register of 1857 the name changes to the consortium road known as in Chiosso. The name is a vulgarization of the late medieval hortus clausus, which indicated a small cultivated area for family use enclosed by a hedge or palisade. The street is located southwest of the historic center, near the monumental cemetery of Busto Arsizio.

==== Via Comalone ====
This odonym is found today in the northeast of Busto Arsizio, in an area of fields, but in the past this name was also given to today's Fratelli Cervi and Varese streets, which lead westward from the historic center. Comalone Street is already recorded in the Book of Tithing of 1399, where it is referred to as in Capite Maloni, probably derived from the name of the owner or tenant of the surrounding land. In 1929 the easternmost section of the street, from the center to the intersection with Via Corbetta, was named Via Varese, but in 1975 the westernmost section of Via Varese assumed the name Via Fratelli Cervi.

==== Via Daniele Crespi ====
This street, named after the Busto painter Daniele Crespi, connects Piazza Garibaldi and Piazza Trento e Trieste. Already present in the Teresian Cadastre, it was the southward extension of the Prato Basilica (today Piazza Garibaldi) outside the fortifications of the ancient village. It runs parallel to what used to be the Contrada San Gregorio and until 1860 had no documented name (it is not found in either the 1857 Cadastre or the writings of Luigi Ferrario). When in 1860 the charity kindergarten “Sant'Anna” was opened in today's Piazza Trento e Trieste, the street assumed the name of Via all'asilo infantile, which it maintained until the early 20th century (in 1907 the street already had its current name). After the construction of the kindergarten, a votive shrine named after Our Lady was demolished in 1862 to make room for the street, which after two years was rebuilt as the shrine of Santa Maria Nascente at the entrance to Via Daniele Crespi from Piazza Trento e Trieste.

==== Via Santa Croce ====
Located in the heart of the historic center, perpendicular to Via Sant'Antonio that connects Piazza Santa Maria and Piazza San Giovanni, the route of this street was already present in the Teresian Cadastre and is found in the 1857 Cadastre under the name of Via Santa Croce. The odonym is derived from the existence of a church dedicated precisely to the Cross erected in the second half of the 15th century, next to which was the headquarters of the Confraternity of the Disciplines. In the 18th century the confraternity was suppressed, and in the 20th century the decline of the church began. Reduced first to barracks and then acquired by private individuals, its demolition began in 1971, and in 1973 the remaining part of the religious building finally collapsed.

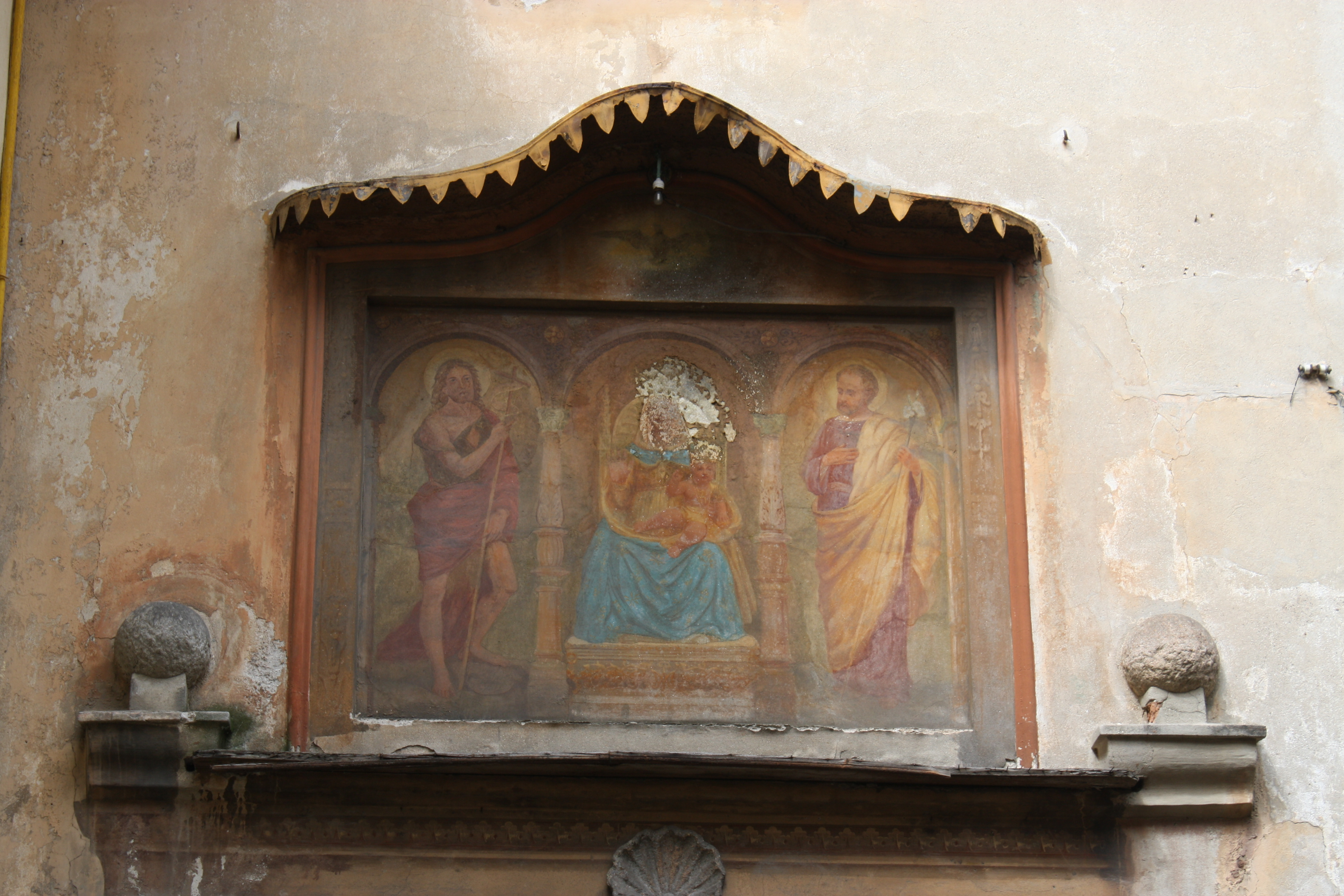
The fresco at the end of Custodi Alley depicting Our Lady of Help with two saints.

==== Vicolo Custodi ====
This is a side street of Montebello Street, about 50 m from the shrine of Santa Maria di Piazza. It is a cul-de-sac named after the historic owners of the buildings facing this street: the Custodi family. This family appears to have been present in the village since the beginning of the 17th century with some representatives who made a significant contribution to the social and religious life of the village. Characteristic of this street is the fresco by Carlo Grossi located at its end, above the portal of an old private chapel of the Custodi House and depicting Our Lady of Help with two saints.

==== Via Dante Alighieri ====
At the end of the 19th century, the Novara-Seregno railway was built, and in 1887 the Busto Arsizio Nord station was opened and a freight yard was built further west, between the towns of Busto Arsizio and Sacconago (the latter is now a district of the former). Thus the need arose to build a road connection between the center of the suburb and the new freight yard on the railway line (now buried). The construction of the Teatro Sociale in 1891 accelerated the construction of the road that from Via Giuseppe Mazzini, which marked the southern boundary of the ancient village, leads to today's Via Vincenzo Monti passing by Piazza Plebiscito, where the aforementioned theater stands. The current name of the street, which begins at the intersection with Via Roma, appears from the early 20th century.

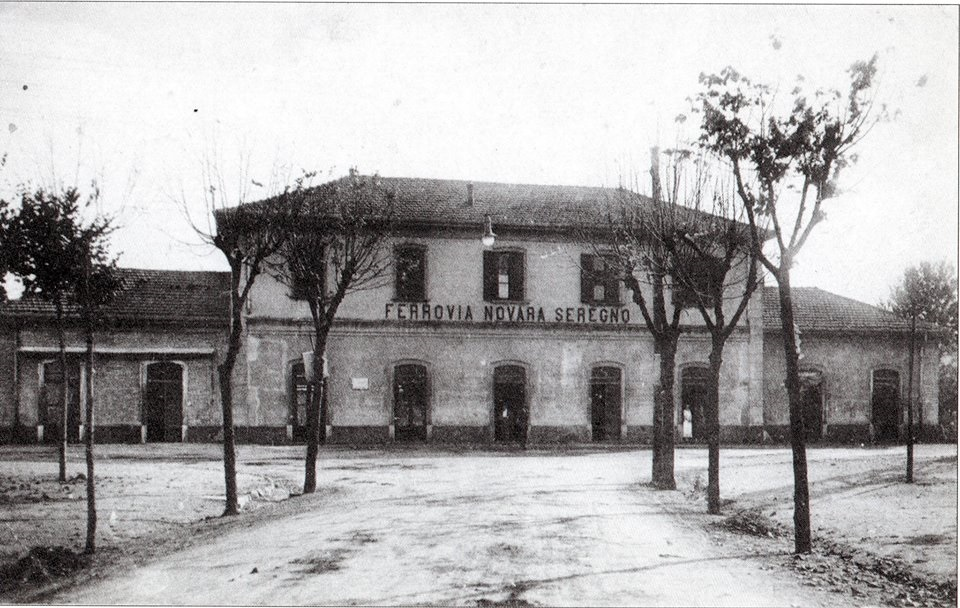
The old Busto Arsizio Nord station, at the end of Ugo Foscolo Street, before its demolition resulting from the burying of the railway.

==== Corso Europa ====
This is the street that goes westward from Piazza Santa Maria to Piazza Alessandro Manzoni and was built to execute the detailed plan for the opening of a connecting street between the two squares. The name Corso Europa was assigned by resolution of the City Council on July 20, 1959, which was later renewed in 1964.

==== Via Ugo Foscolo ====
The first part of the current route, the one furthest north, already appears in the Teresian Cadastre and in that of 1857 corresponds to the beginning of the old municipal road to Borsano. With the entry into service of the Novara-Seregno railway in 1883 and the opening of the Busto Arsizio Nord station, the road was extended to the station building, connecting it to the city center. The current name dates back to the early 20th century and also gives its name to Ugo Foscolo Park.

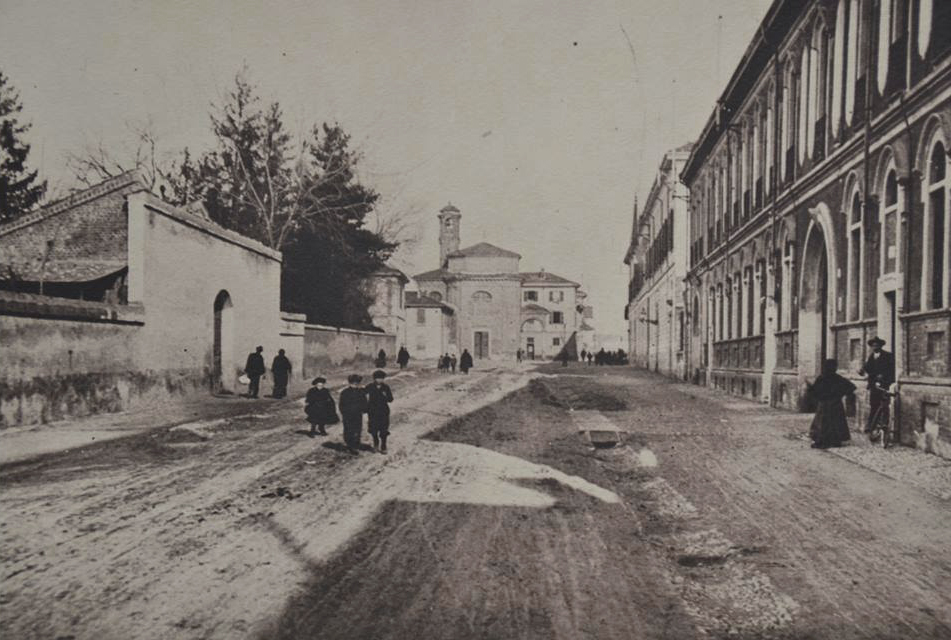
La via Fratelli d'Italia in una foto d'epoca, con il Tempio Civico, Palazzo Gilardoni e, sulla destra più vicino al fotografo, la casa Candiani, oggi demolita.

==== Via Fratelli d'Italia ====
This is the street that runs behind Palazzo Gilardoni, home of the town hall. The southern section, from today's Piazza Giuseppe Garibaldi and Via Antonio Pozzi, traces the area of the moat and embankment, which in the Teresian Cadastre were already leveled. At the end of the street is the civic temple of the Blessed Virgin of Grace, built beginning in 1710: in 1812 the street was reported to be called the street of the Blessed Virgin of Grace. In 1852, in front of the little church, where there was an oratory named after St. Joseph, the building of the hospital was begun, completed in 1859, now the town hall: the street thus assumed the odonym of Via dell'Ospedale. After the assassination of King Umberto I in Monza in 1900, the street was named after him, while during the period of the Republic of Salò (1944–45) it became Via Aldo Bormida. After the Liberation it was given the name Fratelli d'Italia street.

==== Piazza San Giovanni Battista ====
It is one of the two central squares of Busto Arsizio, along with the older Piazza Santa Maria, and is named after the basilica of St. John the Baptist. It does not appear in the Book of the Tithing of 1399, where the only square listed was Platea (Piazza Santa Maria). The present area belonged to the Contrada Basilica, today's Via Milano, which ran from there to today's Piazza Giuseppe Garibaldi (Prato Basilica), while another road ran in front of the cemetery in front of the basilica. In 1609 the architect Francesco Maria Richini was entrusted with the construction of the new basilica on an earlier church: the cemetery was relocated and in the first decades of the 18th century the layout of the new square was being shaped by the demolition of some buildings in front of the church. The northern side of the square was expanded in 1906.

==== Via vicinale del Lazzaretto ====
This street is located in the eastern area of the Borsano district, an autonomous municipality until 1928, and runs alongside its cemetery. The name is due to the establishment along this street of a lazaretto, a structure used to receive the terminally ill during the plague of 1630. Another lazaretto existed in the village of Busto Arsizio, where Ugo Foscolo Park stands today.

==== Vicolo Livello (or vicolo Trivello) ====
It opens along Montebello Street, which runs northward from Santa Maria Square. Its route is already present in the Teresian Cadastre, and in the 1857 Cadastre it is found with the name of Vicolo del Trivello. It assumed its present name at the beginning of the 20th century. The name is of uncertain attribution, but it probably derives, both for livello and trivello, from woodworking tools: artisan workshops probably stood there.

==== Via Maestrona ====
Located west of Busto Arsizio, perpendicular to Via Giovanni Amendola, which connects Busto to Lonate Pozzolo, it owes its name to the presence of the Maestrona farmstead, shown in the 1857 Land Register and located near the border with Magnago. The toponym probably derived from the nickname of the family of the owners of the farmstead.

==== Vicolo Mangano ====
Located between Piazza San Giovanni and Via Solferino, like Contrada del Mangano (today Via Paolo Camillo Marliani) it is named after a textile machine associated with local industry. Such machinery was probably located in a building overlooking this alley and came into operation in the early 19th century. The alley was already present in the Teresian Cadastre, and its present name is found in the 1857 cadastre. Evidence of it can be found until the early 20th century, but then it lost its name. By a resolution of May 15, 1953, the odonym that still exists today was restored.

==== Piazza Santa Maria ====
This is the oldest square in Busto Arsizio, the first nucleus of the ancient village. In the Book of Tithing of 1399 it was the only square in the village and was called in notarial Latin Platea. It was overlooked in the past by the dwellings of the wealthiest families in the village, the town hall, the monastery of the Humiliati, as well as the church named after Our Lady and the civic tower. As described by Luigi Ferrario in 1864, there was a rustic portico adjoining the square for the slaughter of livestock called Beccaria, which was demolished in 1810 and replaced with a new porticoed building with stores on the ground floor and a theater on the second floor, inaugurated in 1811. This building was torn down around 1930 and its columns were reused for the building of the Crespi house on Andrea Zappellini Street. In the center of the square was the so-called pool, a square basin 24 meters on each side and 6.5 meters deep for watering animals, which received water from a detour of the Tenore stream and whose runoff water was used for the discharge of Beccaria's waste. This pool was closed in 1631. This pool is credited with the name of the Contrada Piscina and the town gate of the same name. The name of the square derives from the dedication of the church, whose foundation stone was laid in 1517, to Mary, and the church itself is called the sanctuary of Santa Maria di Piazza to emphasize the importance of the church's topographical location.

==== Vicolo Mariotti ====
Located in the historic center, it connects Montebello Street to the complex called the Count's Residence, located between Vittorio Emanuele II Square and Santa Maria and San Giovanni Squares and completed in 2018. The alley already appears in the Teresian Cadastre, but the current name appears only from 1857. It is named after the nickname Mariotti given to one of several branches of the Crespi family as early as the 18th century. This branch of the family was composed of wealthy landowners and influential clergymen; in fact, a document from 1773, the so-called Ruolo del Personale, lists the Cassina del Mariotto alla Madonna and the Cassina del Mariotto, both located near the church of the Madonna in Prato. From one of the now-destroyed farmsteads owned by this family comes the 16th-17th century fresco of the Deposition, now preserved in the Civic Art Collections of Palazzo Marliani-Cicogna.

==== Via Giuseppe Massari ====
Going along Via Giacomo Matteotti from Piazza Santa Maria westward, it is the second street one encounters on the left. Already present in the Teresian Cadastre, in the 1857 Cadastre this route has the name of Vicolo dei Massari and retains the route to the present day, although shifted by a few meters, turning, however, from an alley into a street following some gutting that opened a double outlet and assuming the new name of Via Giuseppe Massari Industriale. Although the ancient surname Massari exists in Busto Arsizio, the old street's naming derives from the noun “massaro,” or the person who, in central and northern Italy, worked in a farm without paying rent and shared the harvest with the landowner. From the 1757 Summary it is known that there were four complete dwellings and three portions of a house “da massaro” at that time.

==== Via San Michele ====
This is the street that runs from the entrance of the church of San Michele Arcangelo to Montebello Street and traces the course of the northern embankment and moat defending the ancient village of Busto. In the first half of the seventeenth century, the moat and embankment were flattened and the straight course of the street was delineated, clearly evident in the Teresian Cadastre and remaining almost unchanged in that of 1857, where the name Corsia di San Michele known as Contrada di Sopra is found. From 1876 the naming became Via San Michele, but from 1940 it was named after Italo Balbo, and then retook its present name after World War II.

==== Via Ponzella ====
This is a road located southeast of Busto Arsizio, near the border with Castellanza. In the Land Register of 1857 it is called a municipal road known as the old one to Legnano and led to Legnano, and then to Milan, through the Mazzafame and Ponzella farmsteads, in Legnano territory. The Ponzella farmstead, which gives its name to the road, is mentioned in a bequest made by the nobleman Agostino Lambugnano to the church of San Magno.

==== Vicolo Re Magi ====
This is the last alley one encounters on the left when walking down Montebello Street from Santa Maria Square to Cristoforo Colombo Square. Its layout already appears in the Teresian Cadastre and takes the name of Via dell'aia grande in the 1857 Cadastre, due to the presence of a large threshing floor for grain preparation. In the 1910 toponymy, the current name of Vicolo Re Magi is found, a name given to recall the city gate of the same name that stood nearby and was demolished in 1880.

==== Vicolo Rovello ====
This is the blind alley that roughly from the middle of Montebello Street runs westward for 30 meters. The layout of the alley is already present in the Teresian Cadastre and is preserved in that of 1857 under the name of vicolo dei rovi (alley of brambles), popularly called vicolo rovè, later transforming in the 1910 topography into the present name of Vicolo Rovello.

==== Via Scisciana ====
In the 1857 Land Registry there is a street called local road known as Scisciana, which ran northward from the road to Fagnano (present-day Volturno and Gaudenzio Ferrari streets) cutting across Simplon and connecting with the Gerbone road (a toponym still existing on the border with Olgiate Olona). The street was named after the Scisciana farmstead that was located near its route.

==== Corso Sempione ====
It is the road that roughly corresponds to the ancient Roman Mediolanum-Verbannus road that connected, already in a period between the end of the Republican era and the first decades of the Imperial age, Mediolanum to Verbannus Lacus. In the Busto Arsizio area it entered the Selva longa, which extended from Gallarate to Legnano. The present Busto route underwent two slight modifications for the construction of the Novara-Seregno railway.

==== Via della Vite ====
The name of this road, located north of Busto Arsizio near the border with Samarate, is reminiscent of the cultivation of Vitis vinifera, which was once widespread in Busto territory as well. As noted in the Teresian Cadastre, vineyards in the surrounding area were concentrated in the fields surrounding the villages, which were more populated with farmsteads and therefore better maintained.

=== Other toponyms ===
==== Cascina Brughetto ====
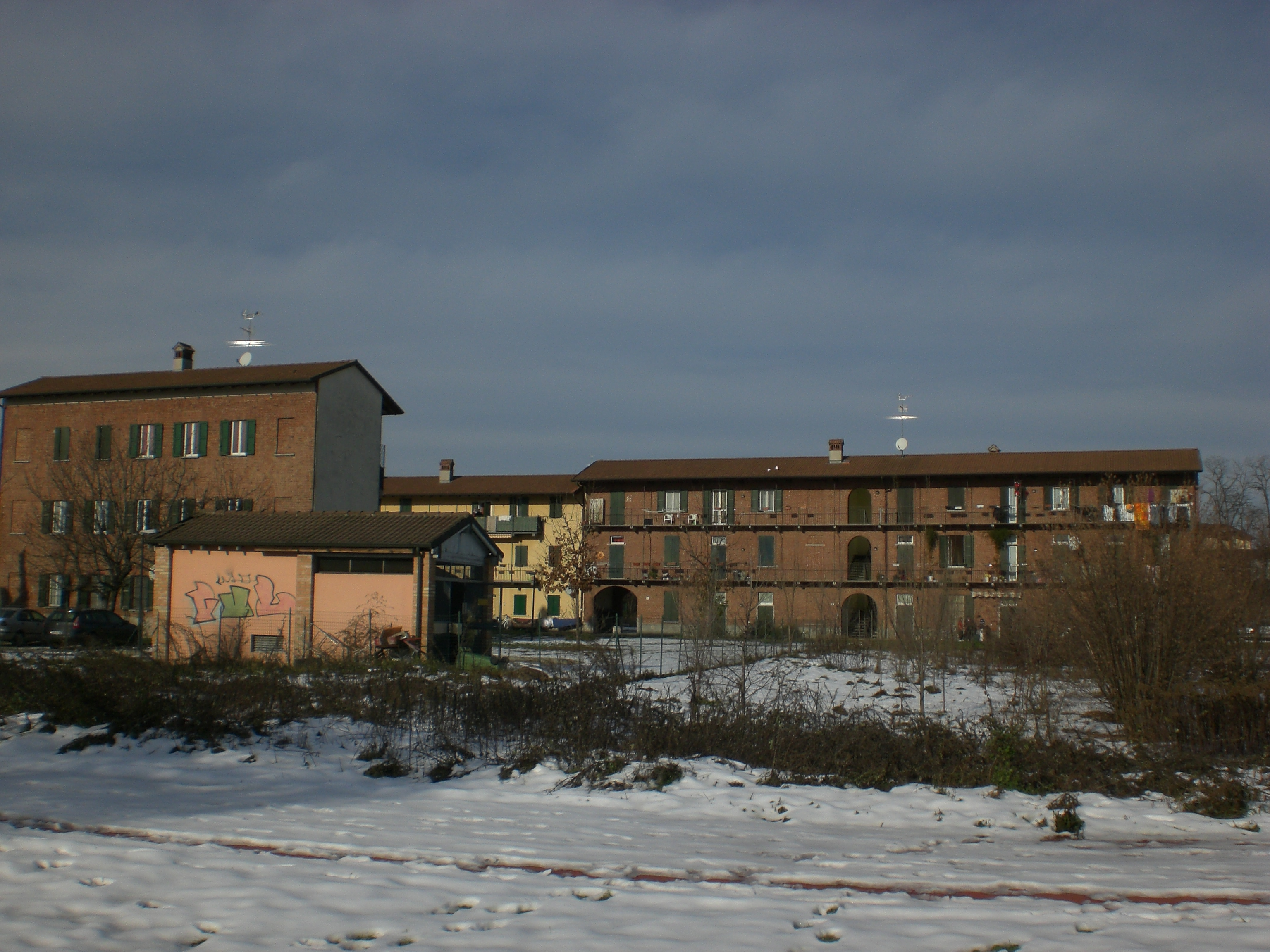
Cascina Brughetto

This area takes its name from a farmstead, still in existence, located south of Busto Arsizio and east of Sacconago. The toponym Brughetum has been documented since the 16th century; its name was probably derived from brugo (heather), a typical heath plant. It was connected to the center of Busto by the Strà Brüghetu. Now Cascina Brughetto corresponds to the southern area of the neighbourhood of Sant'Edoardo.

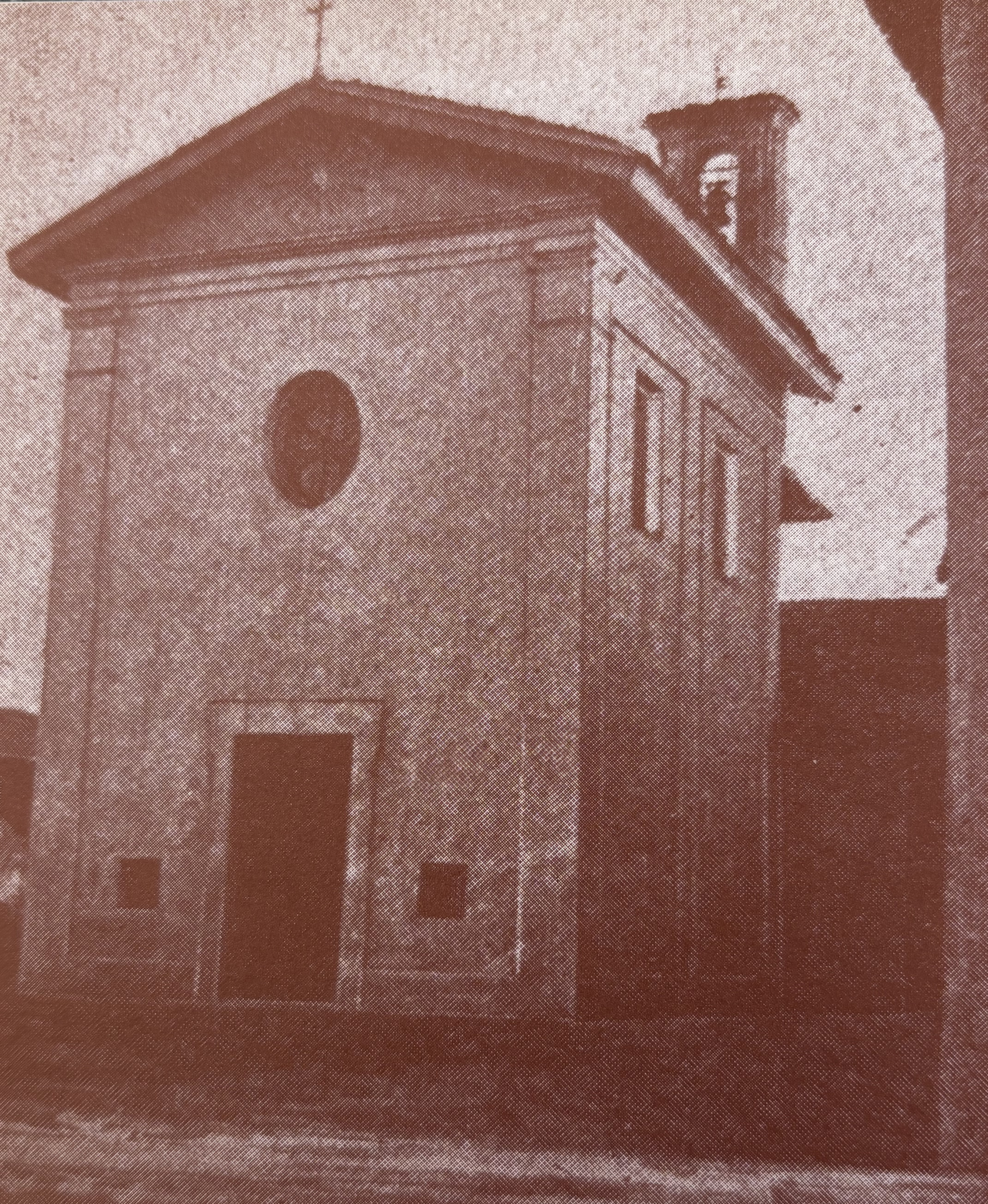
The Church of Saint Eurosia

The first church here, a small chapel dedicated to Saint Eurosia, was demolished in the 1950s, having been replaced by the church of Sant’Edoardo, consecrated in 1939, which gave its name to the neighbourhood as it expanded. Additionally, the church of Santa Croce began construction in 1948 (it was named after a much older church in central Busto Arsizio, deconsecrated in 1948 and eventually demolished in 1972) and became an independent parish in 1991.

==== Cinque Ponti ====
Due to the eastward expansion of the city, which entailed heavy costs for the management of the new level crossings that had come into being, a project was initiated between 1906 and 1907 to move the Busto Arsizio station so as to bring it outside the built-up area, and the present station came into operation in 1924. For the intersection of the railroad and the (then provincial) Simplon road, a massive five-arch overpass was designed, which gave its name to the surrounding area. In 1910 the first contract was started for the construction of the new railway station and underpass structures to the Simplon road as well as overpasses to the other roads affected by the passage of the new rail route. Due to problems with the state budget caused by the Italo-Turkish War and World War I, work was halted, only to slowly resume in 1914. With the outbreak of war, work was again interrupted and resumed in 1919, uninterrupted until its completion.

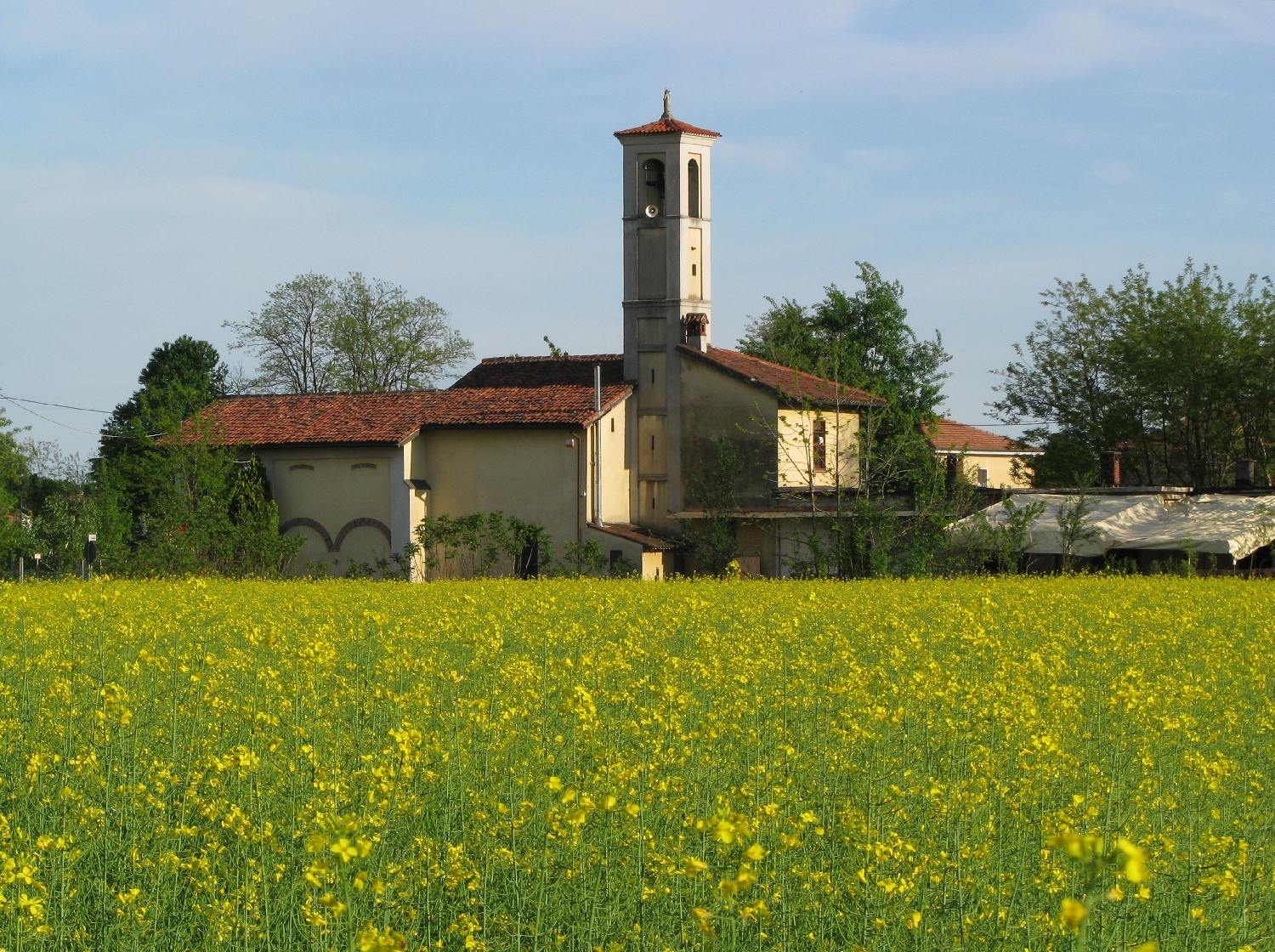
The church of the Madonna in Veroncora as seen from the north.

==== Veroncora ====
Veroncora (or Veroncola) is the name of a locality on the northeastern outskirts of Busto Arsizio, not far from the border with Sacconago. According to some local historians, the name Verònca was already in use in the 14th century, and is said to derive from an adaptation of the dialectal phrase ves'ai ronchi, meaning “toward the woods.” In 1639, documents attest to the presence of the church of the Madonna in Veroncora, which still exists today, at the junction of the two roads.

== History ==
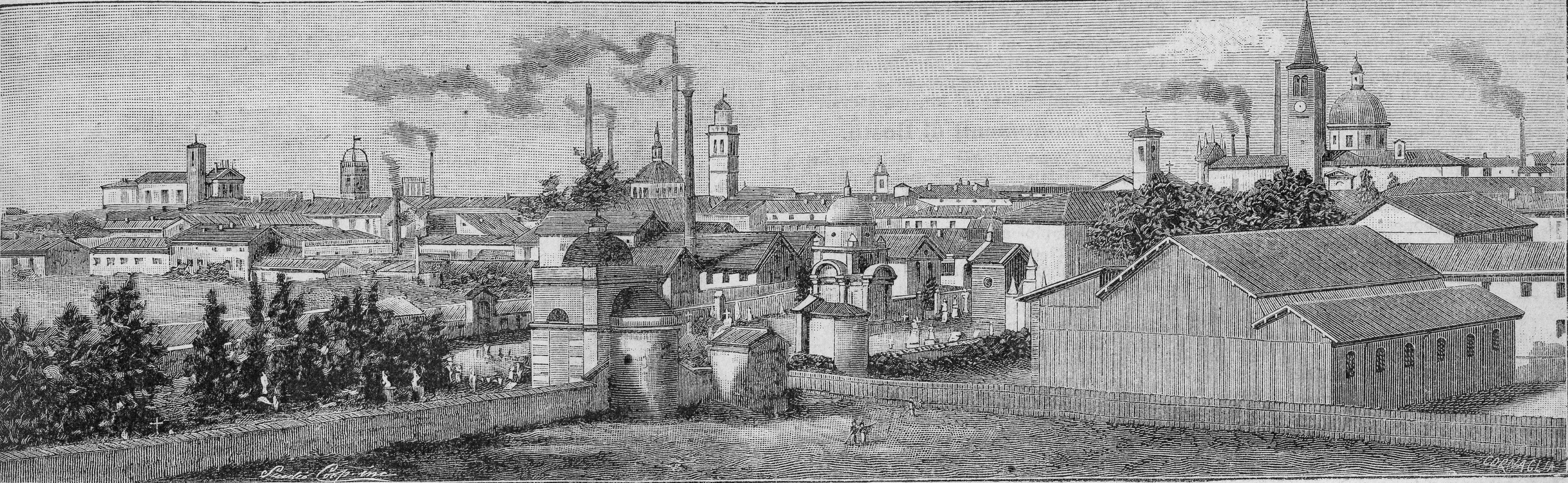
Panorama of Busto Arsizio in 1894, viewed from behind the present day Via Ugo Foscolo

Despite some claims about a Celtic heritage, recent studies suggest that the "Bustocchi"'s ancestors were Ligurians, called "wild" by Pliny, "marauders and robbers" by Livy and "unshaven and hairy" by Pompeius Tragus. They were skilled ironworkers and much sought after as mercenary soldiers. A remote Ligurian influence is perceptible in the local dialect, Büstócu, slightly different from other Western Lombard varieties, according to a local expert and historian Luigi Giavini.

Traditionally these first inhabitants used to set fire to woods made of old and young oaks and black hornbeams, which at that time, covered the whole Padan Plain. This slash-and-burn practice, known as "debbio" in Italian, aimed to create fields where grapevines or cereals such as foxtail, millet and rye were grown, or just to create open spaces where stone huts with thatched roofs were built. By doing this, they created a bustum (burnt, in Latin), that is a new settlement which, in order to be distinguished from the other nearby settlements, was assigned a name: arsicium (again "burnt", or better "arid") for Busto Arsizio, whose name is actually a tautology; carulfì for nearby Busto Garolfo, cava for Busto Cava, later Buscate.

The slow increase in population was helped by the Insubres, a Gaulish tribe who arrived in successive waves by crossing the Alps c. 500 BCE. It is said that they defeated the Etruscans, who by then controlled the area, leaving some geographical names behind (Arno creek (not to be confused with Florence's river), Castronno, Caronno, Biandronno, etc.).

Busto Arsizio was created on the route between Milan and Lake Maggiore (called "Milan’s road", an alternative route to the existent Sempione), part of which, before the creation of the Naviglio Grande, made use of the navigational water of the Ticino river.

However, nothing is clearly known about Busto Arsizio's history before the 10th century, when the city's name was first discovered in documents, already with its present name: loco Busti qui dicitur Arsizio. A part of the powerful Contado of the Seprio, in 1176, its citizens likely participated (on both sides) in the famous Battle of Legnano, actually fought between Busto Arsizio's frazione of Borsano and nearby Legnano, when Frederick Barbarossa was defeated by the communal militia of the Lombard League. From the 13th century, the city became renowned for its production of textiles. Even its feudalization in later centuries under several lords, vassals of the masters of Milan, did not stop its slow but constant growth; nor did the plague, which hit hard in 1630, traditionally being stopped by the Virgin Mary after the Bustocchi, always a pious Catholic flock, prayed for respite from the deadly epidemic.

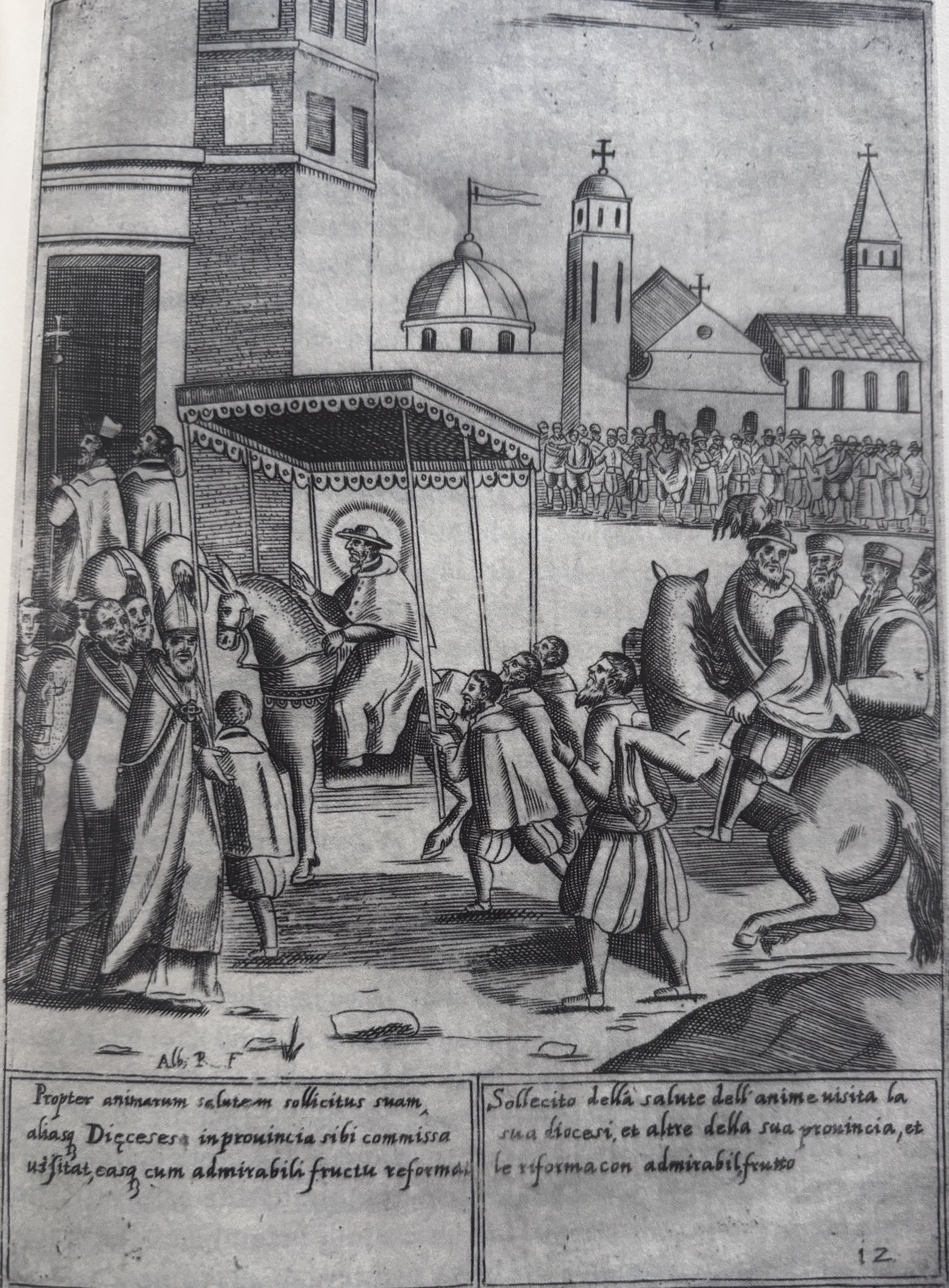
San Carlo Borromeo’s visit to Busto Arsizio in 1583. In the background the churches of San Michele, San Giovanni, and Santa Maria are shown.

By the mid-19th century, modern industry began to take over strongly; in a few decades, Busto Arsizio became the so-called "Manchester of Italy". In 1864, it was granted privileges by king Victor Emmanuel II of Italy.

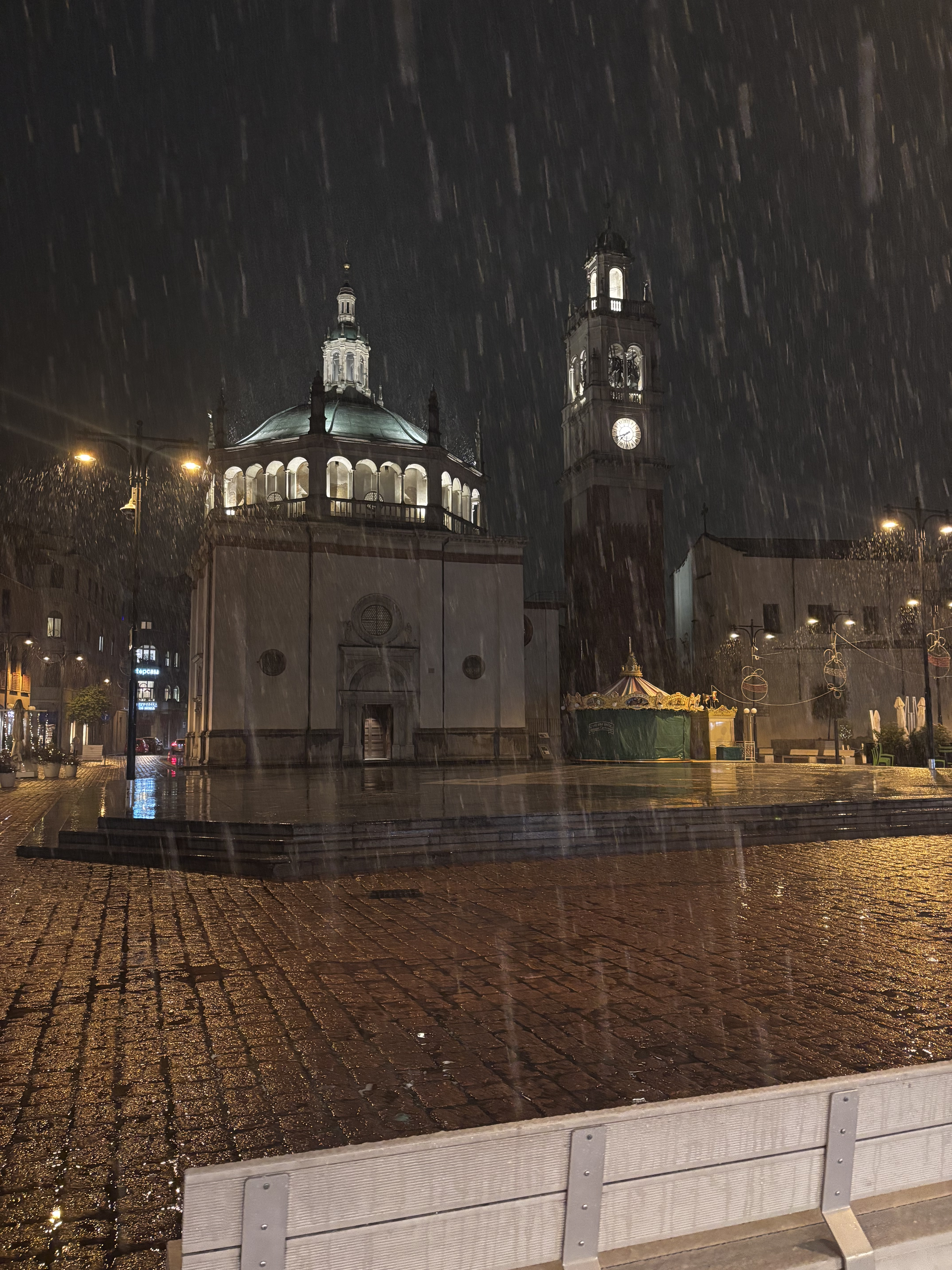
The Santuario di Santa Maria di Piazza during a snowstorm, 2024

Busto Arsizio continued to grow over the next century, absorbing the nearby communities of Borsano and Sacconago in 1927 in a major administrative reform implemented by the Fascist regime and was only marginally damaged even by World War II (a single Allied airdropped bomb is said to have hit the train station). This respite was given, actually, by the fact that the city hosted the important Allied liaison mission with the partisans, the Mission Chrysler, led by Lt. Aldo Icardi, later famous for his involvement in the Holohan murder case. During the conflict, Busto Arsizio was a major industrial centre for war production, and the occupying Germans moved the Italian national radio there. The Italian resistance movement resorted preferably to strikes and sabotage than to overt guerrilla warfare, since those willing to fight mostly took to the Ossola mountains, but strengthened in time, suffering grievous losses to arrests, tortures and deportation to the Nazi lager system. The names of Mauthausen-Gusen and Flossenbürg concentration and extermination camps are sadly known to the Bustocchi, as dozens of their fellow citizens died there. On 25 April 1945, when the partisans took over, Busto Arsizio gave voice to the first free radio channel in northern Italy since the advent of Fascism, at the Church of St. Edward, thanks to Don Ambrogio Gianotti.

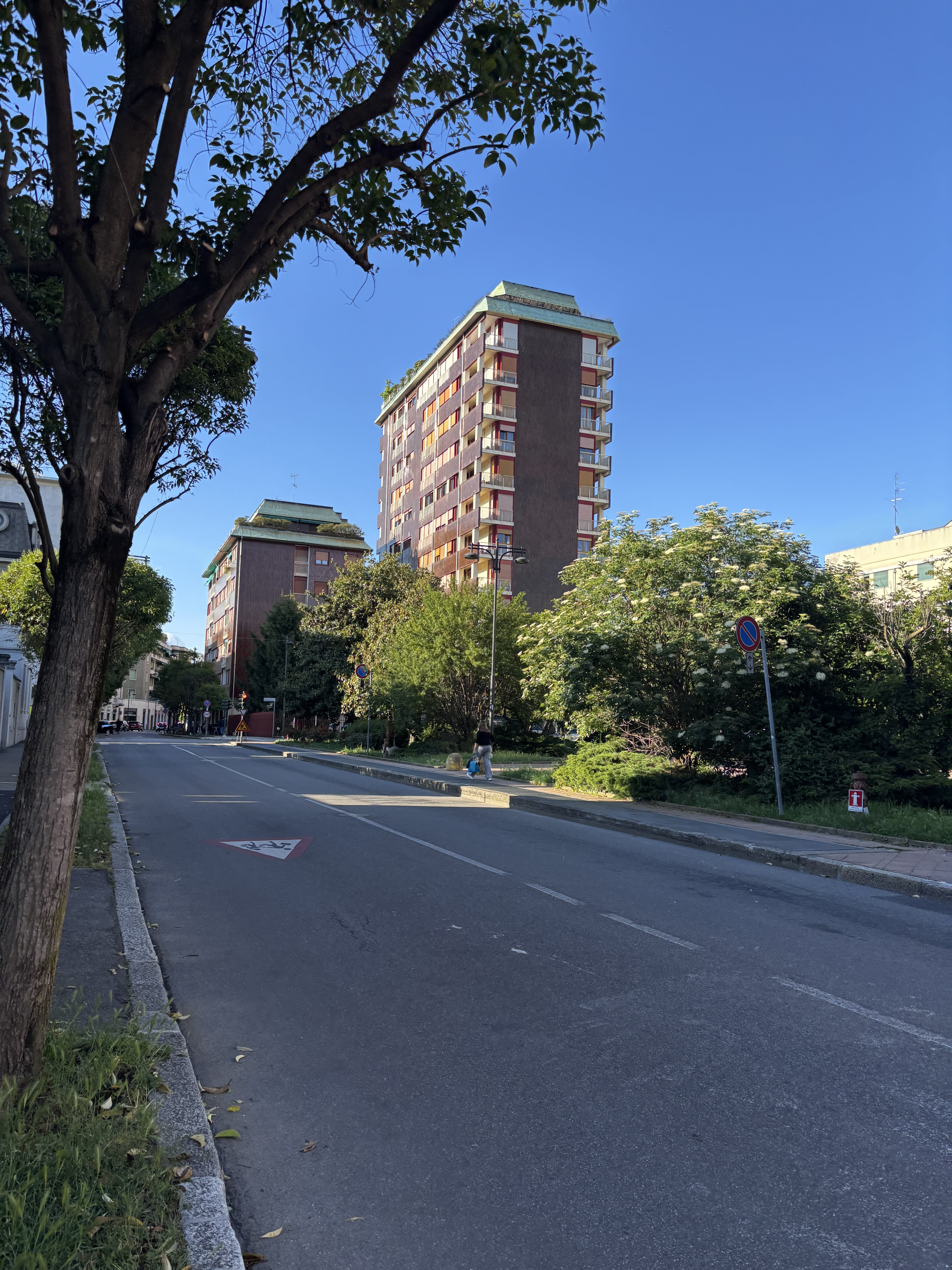
The condominium Castore e Polluce is one of several highrise apartment buildings built following Busto Arsizio’s post war economic boom and its population growth

After the war, Busto Arsizio turned increasingly on the right of the political spectrum as its bigger industries in the 1960s and 1970s decayed, to be replaced by many familiar small enterprises and a new service-based economy. Today, the city represents a major stronghold for both Forza Italia and Lega Nord right-wing political parties. In 2026 the Olympic flame of the 2026 Winter Olympics passed through the streets of Busto Arsizio.

Busto Arsizio's districts

There are nine districts in Busto Arsizio, these are: Sant'Anna, San Michele, San Giovanni, Sant'Edoardo, Madonna Regina, Beata Giuliana, Santi Apostoli, Borsano and Sacconago.

== Demographics ==
As of 2026, the population is 84,595, of which 48.4% are males, and 51.6% are females. Minors make up 14.8% of the population, and seniors make up 25.3%.

Historical population

Year	Pop.	±%
1861	15,720	—
1871	16,598	+5.6%
1881	17,113	+3.1%
1901	24,291	+41.9%
1911	31,358	+29.1%
1921	33,742	+7.6%
1931	39,841	+18.1%
1936	42,995	+7.9%

Year	Pop.	±%
1951	52,607	+22.4%
1961	64,367	+22.4%
1971	78,601	+22.1%
1981	79,728	+1.4%
1991	77,094	−3.3%
2001	75,916	−1.5%
2011	79,692	+5.0%
2021	82,754	+3.8%

ISTAT

=== Immigration ===
As of 2025, immigrants make up 14.0% of the population. The 5 largest foreign countries of birth are Albania, Peru, Morocco, Ecuador, and Romania.

== Sights ==
The most important buildings of the city are the churches. There are several built in the last millennium, many of which are reconstructions of former churches.

=== The shrine of Santa Maria di Piazza ===
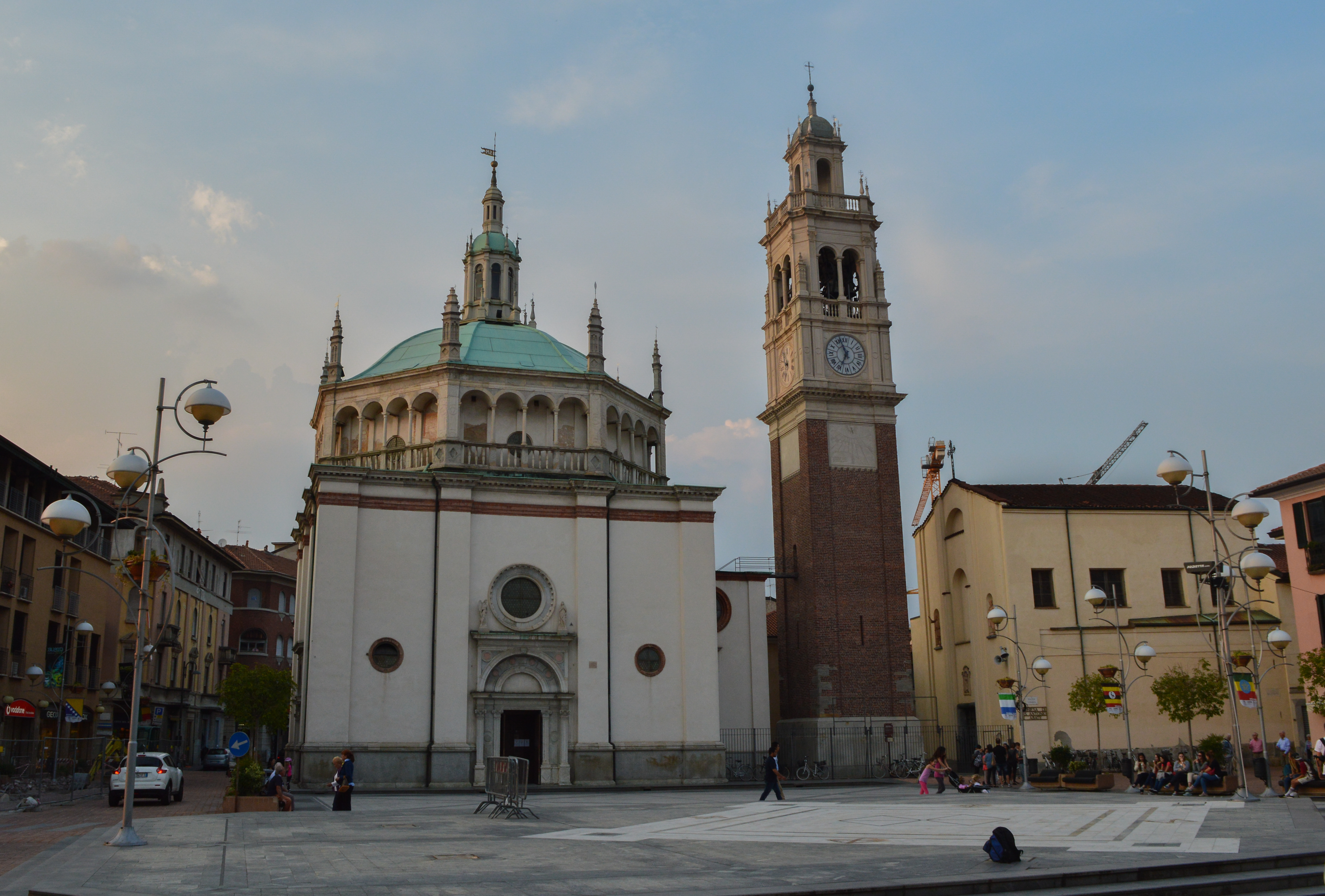
Santa Maria di Piazza

The most remarkable building of the Renaissance period – indeed the only remaining – is the shrine of Santa Maria di Piazza ("Saint Mary of the Square"), also called shrine of the Beata Vergine dell'Aiuto ("Blessed Virgin of the Help"). The building stands in the city centre. It was built between 1515 and 1522. The village of Crespi d'Adda, built up for Cristoforo Benigno Crespi, is home to a smaller version of the shrine.

=== The Basilica of Saint John the Baptist ===
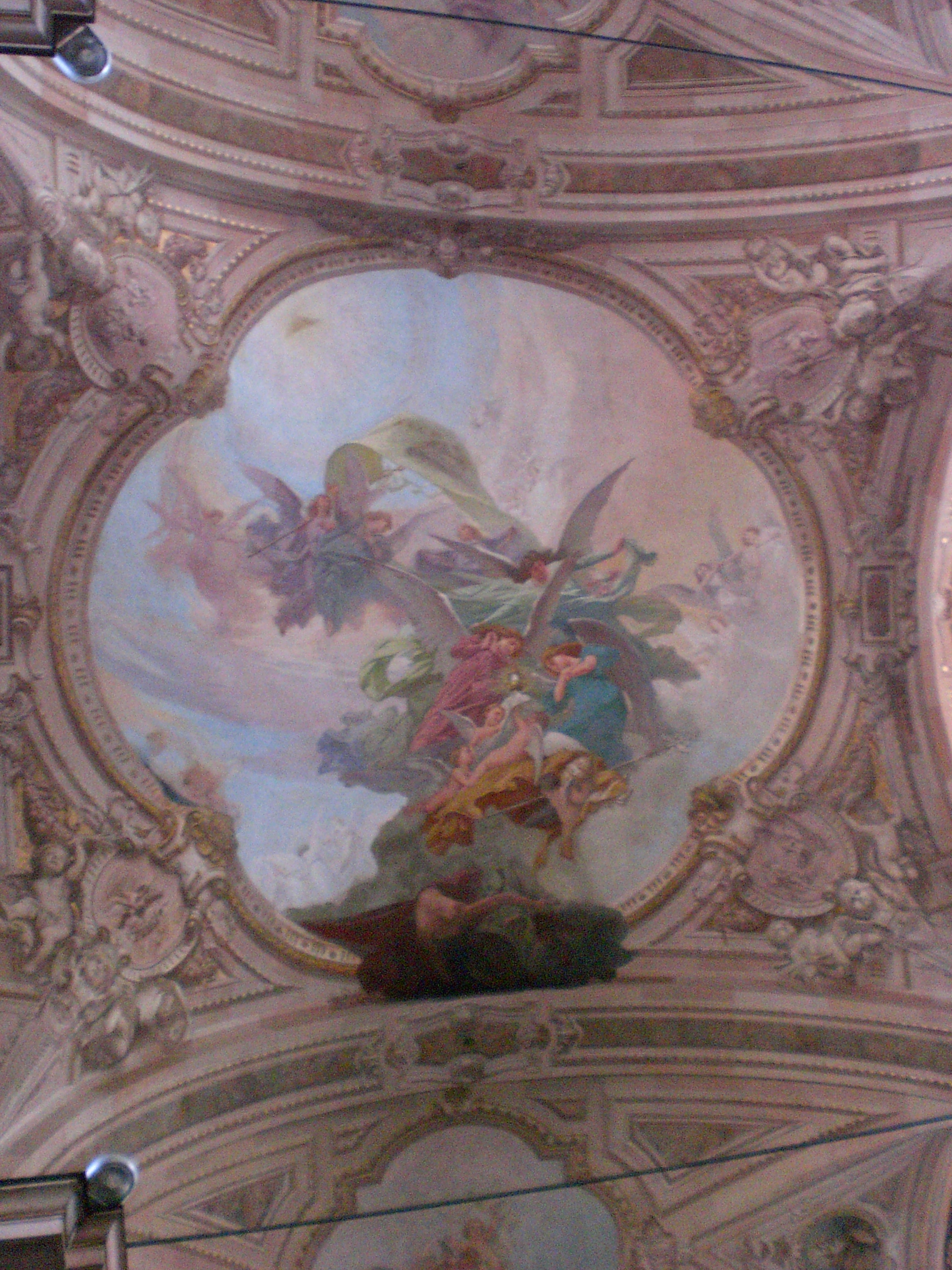
Paintings in Saint John the Baptist church

The Basilica of Saint John the Baptist, in the city centre, was built between 1609 and 1635 by Francesco Maria Ricchini, but the bell tower is older (between 1400 and 1418). The façade, finished in 1701 by Domenico Valmagini, has many statues and decorations. In the interior are numerous paintings by Daniele Crespi, a celebrated painter born at Busto Arsizio, such as Cristo morto con San Domenico and Biagio Bellotti. The square in front of this church was built over the ancient cemetery.

=== The church of Saint Michael the Archangel ===
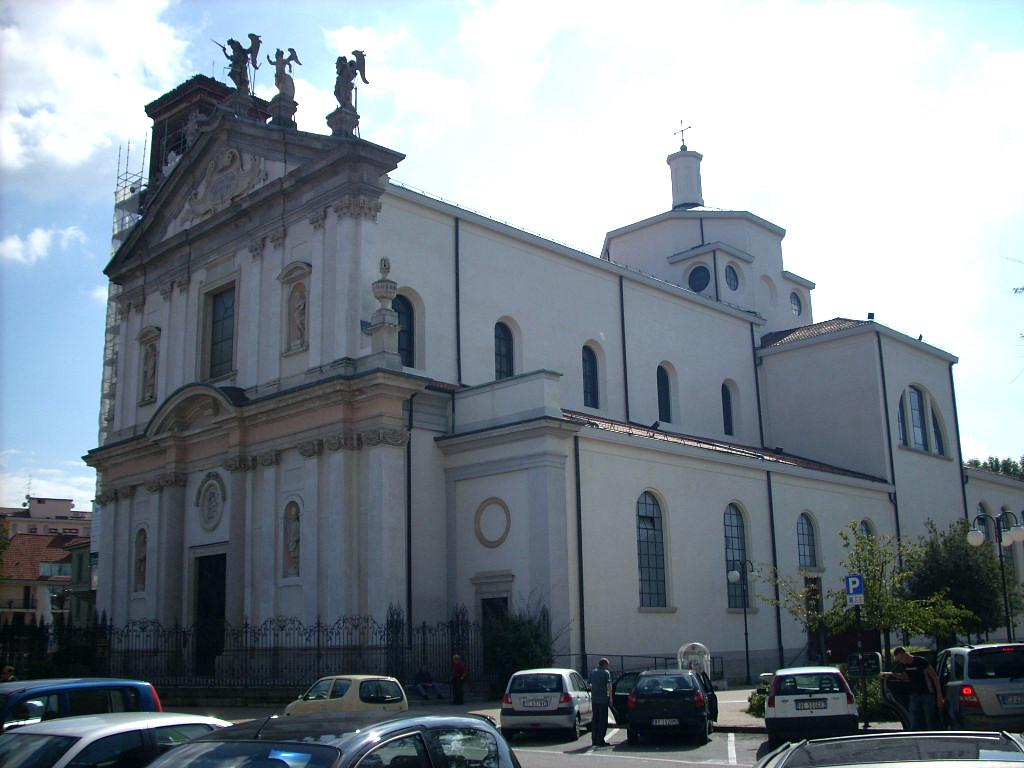
Church of Saint Michael Archangel

The third biggest church in the city is the Church of Saint Michael Archangel (San Michele Arcangelo). Its bell tower, built in the 10th century, is the oldest building in Busto Arsizio; originally it was part of a Lombard fortification. The present church was built by the architect Francesco Maria Richini. In the church there are some relics, the most important of which is the body of San Felice Martire.

=== The church of Saint Roch ===
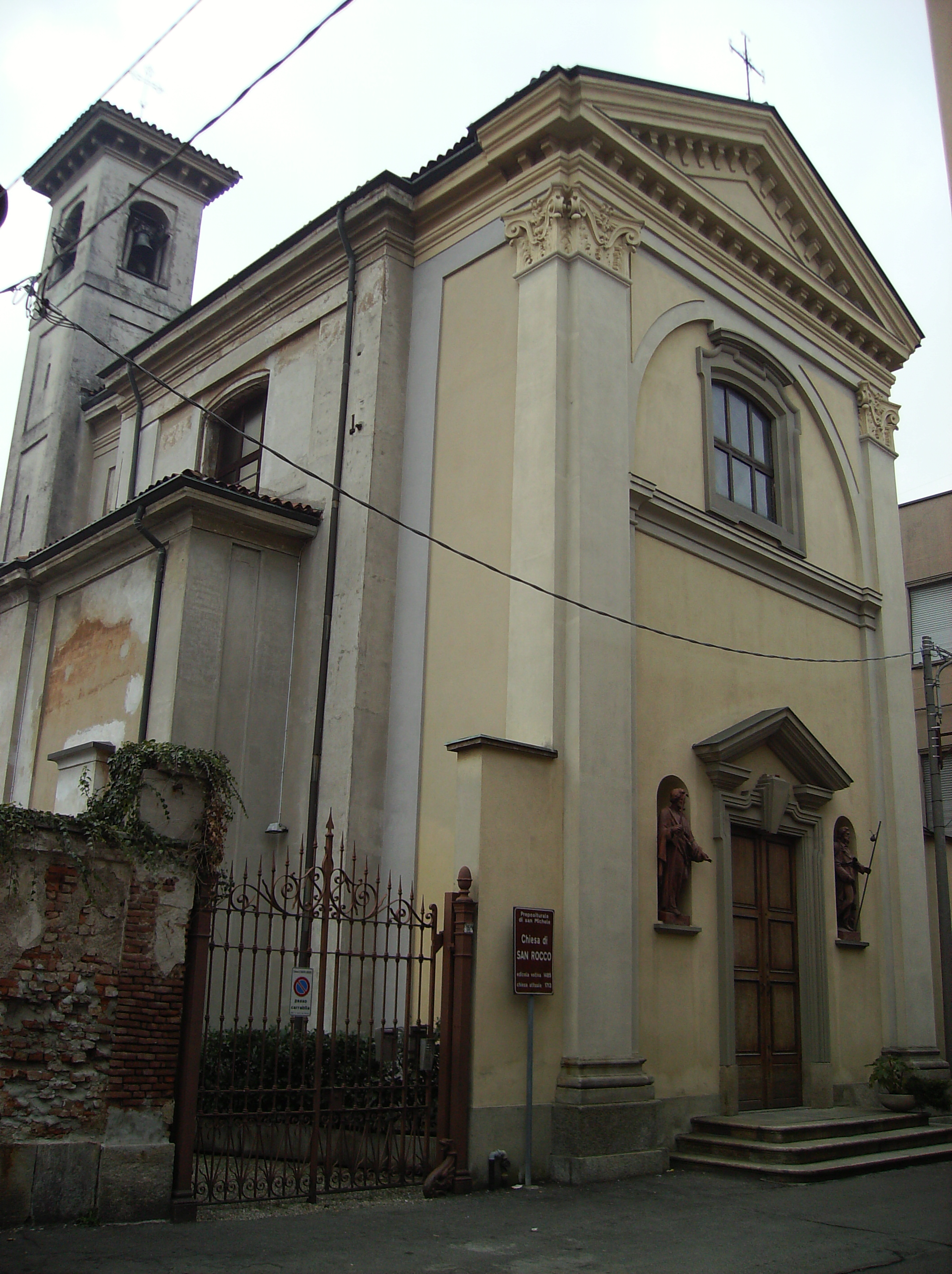
Church of San Rocco

Built after the 1485 bubonic plague and dedicated to Saint Roch, invoked against the plague, it was rebuilt from 1706 to 1713 thanks to donations by the lawyer Carlo Visconti. Inside the church, there are frescos by Salvatore and Francesco Maria Bianchi (1731) and Biagio Bellotti.

=== Museum of Textiles and Industry ===
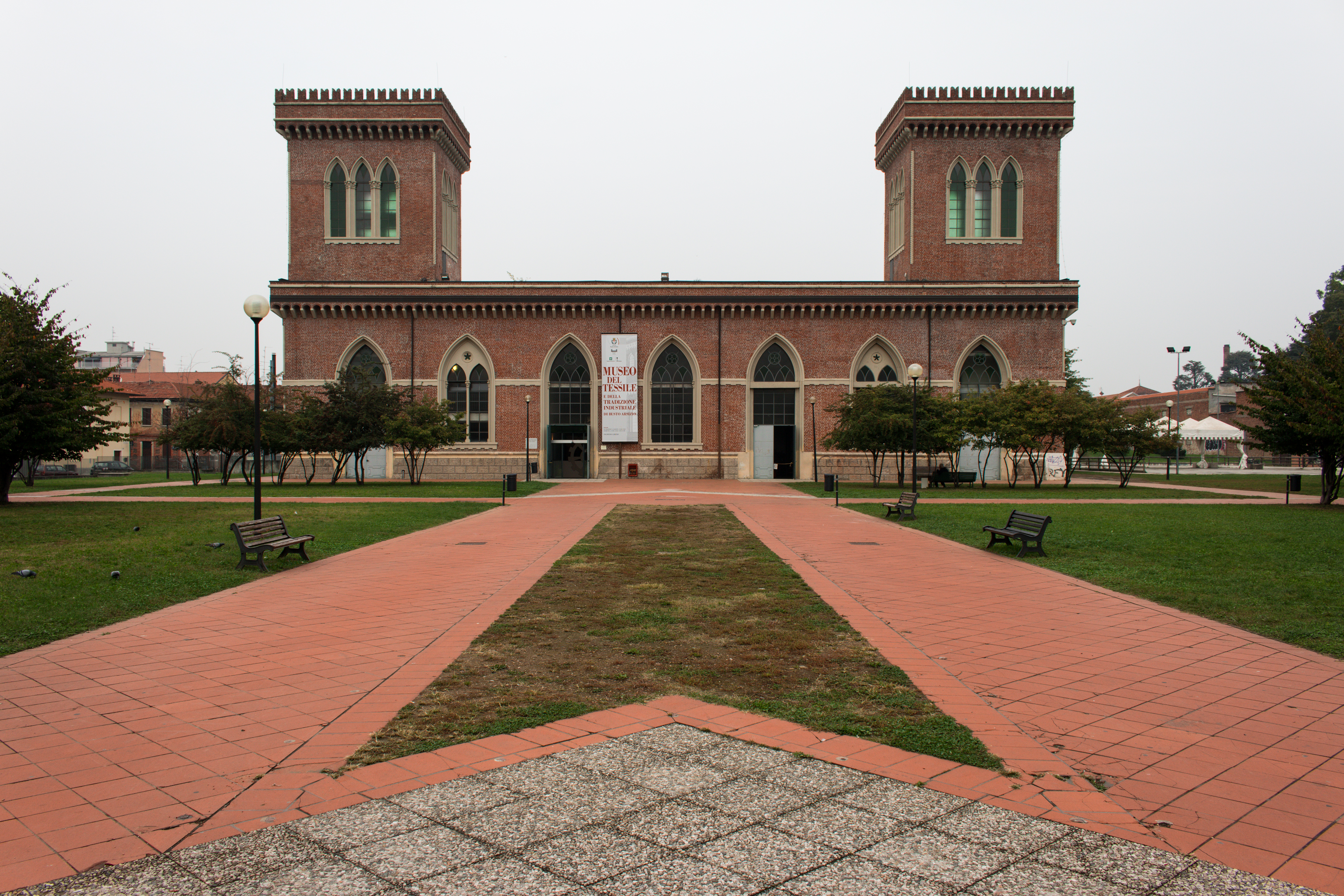
The façade of the museum

The Museum of Textiles and Industry was officially inaugurated in 1997 after years of restoration, and its collections are representative of Busto's economical history. They explain how the city developed from a small agricultural village to a thriving, industrial centre of manufacturing and commerce in a few decades.

== Cascine ==
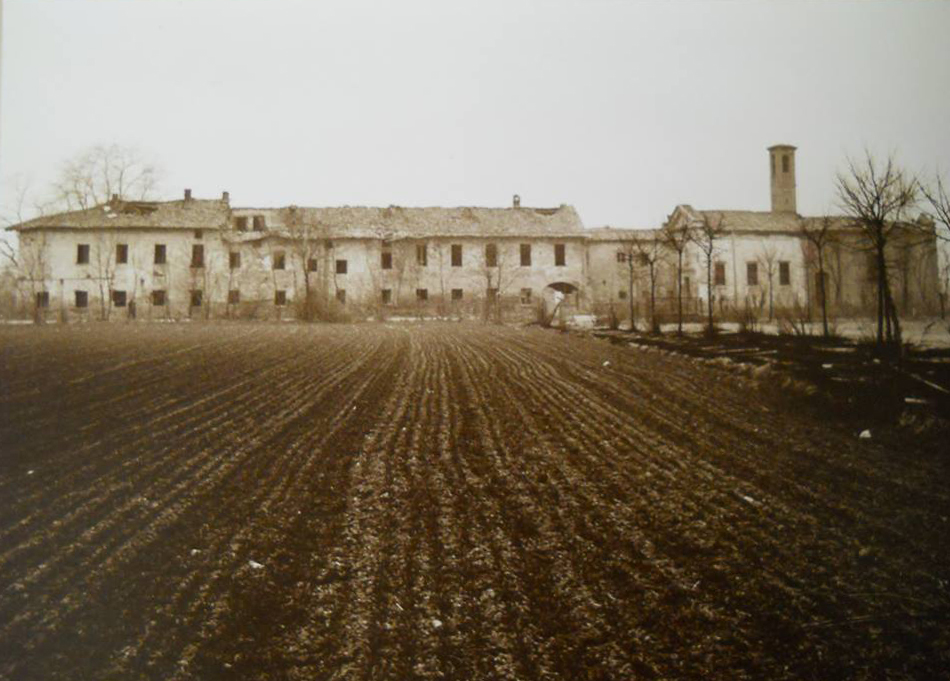
The Cascina dei Poveri, one of Busto Arsizio’s oldest, in the 1980s

The comune of Busto Arsizio has 80 cascine, along with 36 now demolished cascine.

The first Cascine in Busto Arsizio were constructed near the urban centres of Borsano, Sacconago, and Busto Arsizio. The ones in the countryside were constructed along a main road. Between the 18th and 19th centuries, more farmers arrived in the area of Busto Arsizio, and farms began to replace the moorland, and thus new Cascine were constructed, mainly in the northwest area of Busto Arsizio. Several cascine were listed in the Catasto Teresiano between 1718 and 1760, the most important of which were the Cascina dei Poveri, Cascina Selvascia and Cascina Malavita (all in Busto Arsizio), and the Cascina Burattana and Cascina del Sole (in Borsano).

In another Catasto, which took place in the 19th century, we find 23 new cascine in Busto Arsizio, including Cascina Pozzi, Cascina Favana, and Cascina Malpensa, and 4 new cascine in Sacconago, including the Cascina Brughetto. Between the late 19th century and early 20th century, hundreds of cascine were constructed near the old city border, but have now since been incorporated into the city of Busto Arsizio, due to the expansion of the city.

== Culture ==
=== Traditions and festivals ===
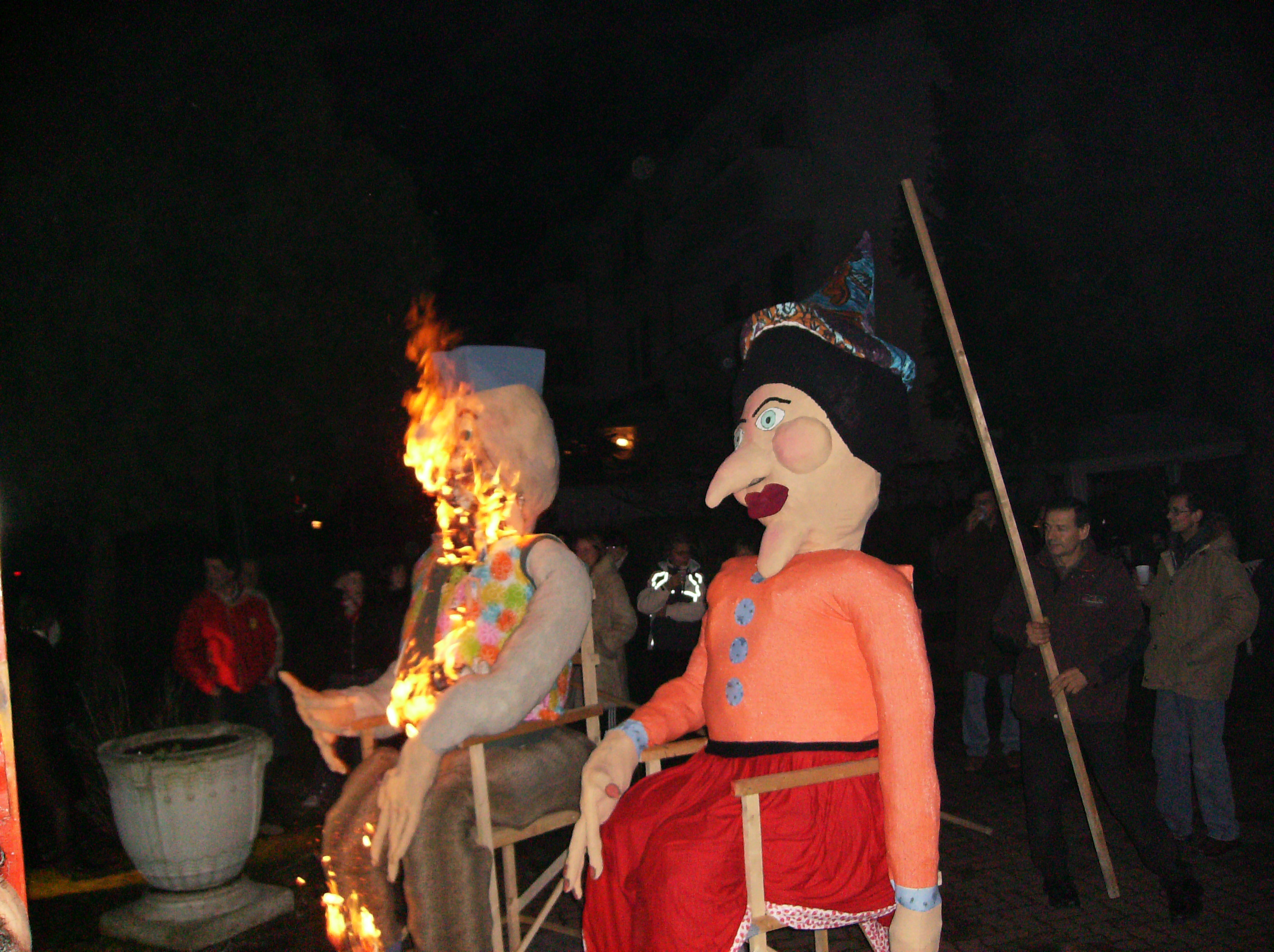
An example of the Giöbia

The patron saints of the city are Saint John the Baptist and Saint Michael the Archangel, whose feasts are traditionally celebrated on 24 June and 29 September.

In recent times the city council has given also civic relevance to celebrations that up to now were almost completely of a religious kind. In winter, the burning of the Giöbia (historical spelling: Gioeubia) a (usually) female puppet, symbolizing the "chasing" out of winter and its troubles, and on a more sinister note, the change from a matriarchal to a patriarchal society in ancient times, is an established tradition since time immemorial. In the past each family prepared its simple puppet to be burnt, and then its ashes were dispersed to fertilize the fields as a good omen. Now the celebration is more organized and publicly supported but still heartily felt by the populace. Busto Arsizio has two carnival masks, called Tarlisu and Bumbasina from the name of typical textiles.

=== Cuisine ===
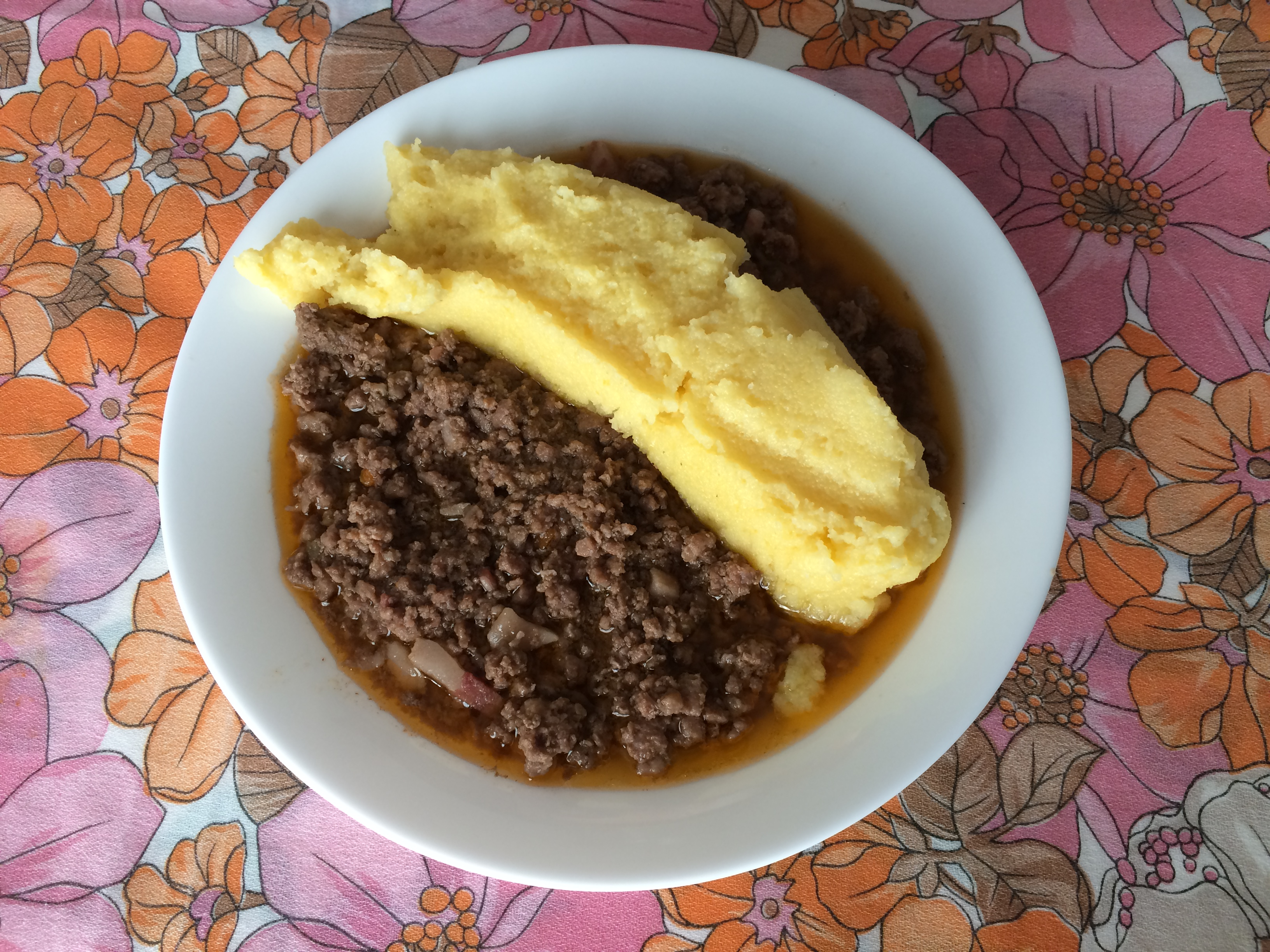
Bruscitti served with polenta porridge

Originating from Busto Arsizio are bruscitti, which consist in a braised meat dish cut very thin and cooked in wine and fennel seeds, historically obtained by stripping leftover meat. Based on finely chopped beef and cooked for a long time, the other ingredients of the dish are butter, lard, garlic and fennel seeds. At the end of cooking they are blended with well-structured red wines such as Barbera or Barolo.

In 1975 in Busto Arsizio the Magistero dei Bruscitti ("Bruscitti Magisterium") was founded, an association with the aim of spreading knowledge of local rustic cuisine. On 16 December 2012 the mayor of Busto Arsizio established "the day of bruscitti" (Ul dí di bruscitt in Lombard), which occurs every second Thursday in November. In 2014 the municipality of Busto Arsizio recognized the denominazione comunale d'origine for bruscitti.

=== Music ===
Mina, an Italian pop star, was born in Busto Arsizio. Italian violinist and conductor Uto Ughi was also born and is currently living in the city.

== Economy ==
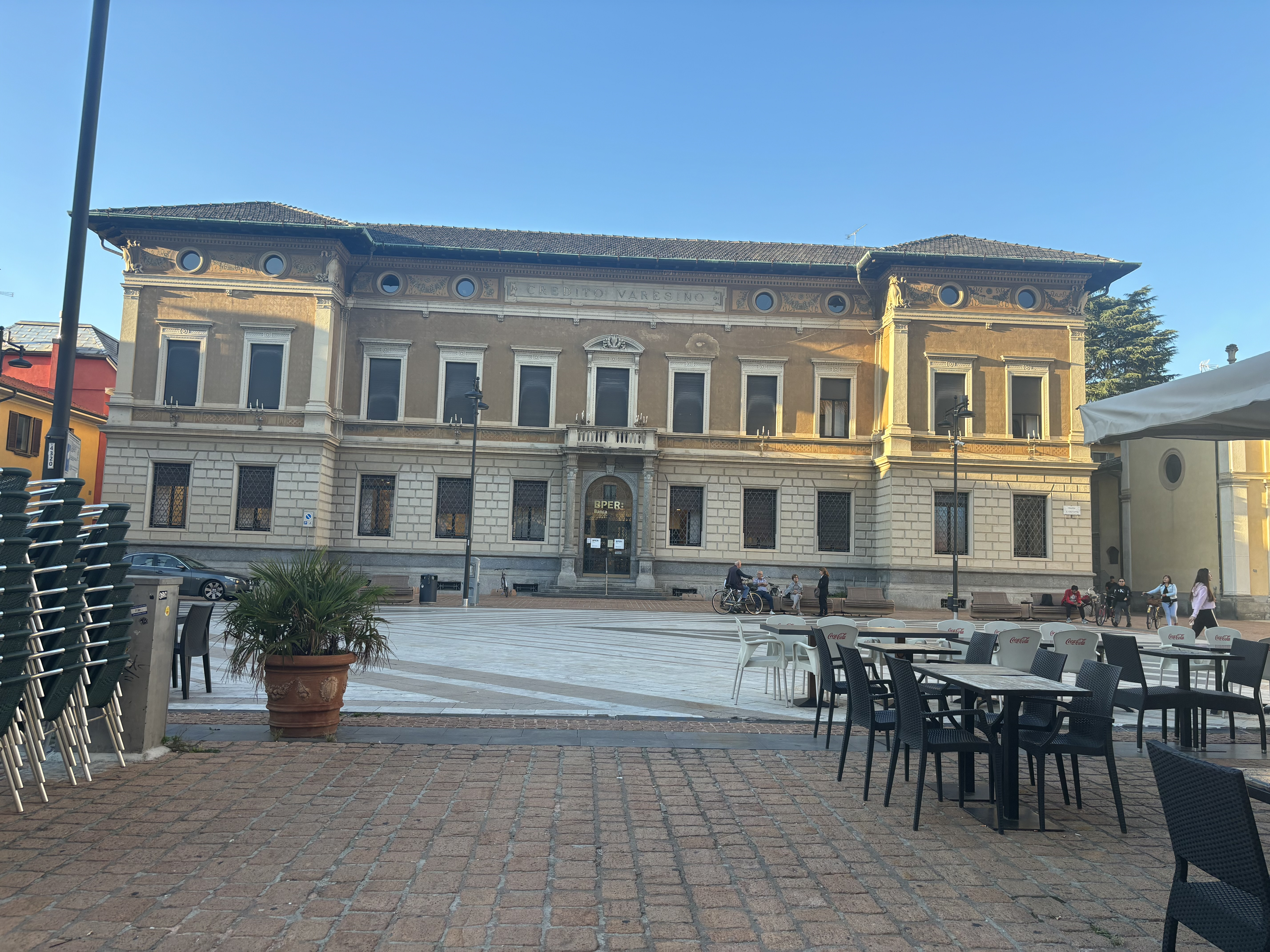
Credito Varesino Bank in Busto Arsizio

Busto Arsizio's economic model has changed over the years: at the beginning, the most developed sectors were the primary and secondary sectors, but in the last decades also the tertiary sector has grown. According to Fitch, in 2009 GDP was 20% higher than the European average, while unemployment was at 4%.

Agriculture

The terrain of Busto Arsizio has never been particularly favourable for agriculture, for this reason from the very beginning the inhabitants of the city added to it other activities, such as leather tanning. Despite this, the primary sector remained the predominant one until the 16th century. The most important crop was that of cereals. Silkworm breeding was also practised for a long time.

Craftsmanship

In the 16th century, Busto Arsizio was known for the production of moleskin. Pewter processing is also widespread in the city, aimed at the production of trophies, trays and plates.

Industry

Busto Arsizio has been one of the major textile centres of Italy for many years and well known abroad. The city birthed a new class of entrepreneurs who started the first textile factors. Also, a new role in society was created: the worker-peasant, who found employment in these factories without completely neglecting agricultural activities. The city began to be called 'the Manchester of Italy' or 'the city of 100 chimneys'.

Services

In 1873 Eugenio Cantoni, Pasquale Pozzi and other entrepreneurs linked to the cotton industry founded the Banca of Busto Arsizio, which was transformed in 1911 into the Italian Provincial Credit Society, a forerunner of Italian Discount Bank, one of the main Italian credit institutions in the years of the First World War.

== Transport ==
Busto Arsizio is served by two railway stations: Busto Arsizio railway station, managed by Rete Ferroviaria Italiana, and Busto Arsizio Nord railway station, managed by Ferrovienord.

Initially, the Busto Arsizio area was selected for one specific reason: ease of transport – the city is located exactly in the middle between Varese and Milan. Travel from Busto Arsizio to either city is approximately 30 minutes.

== Sport ==
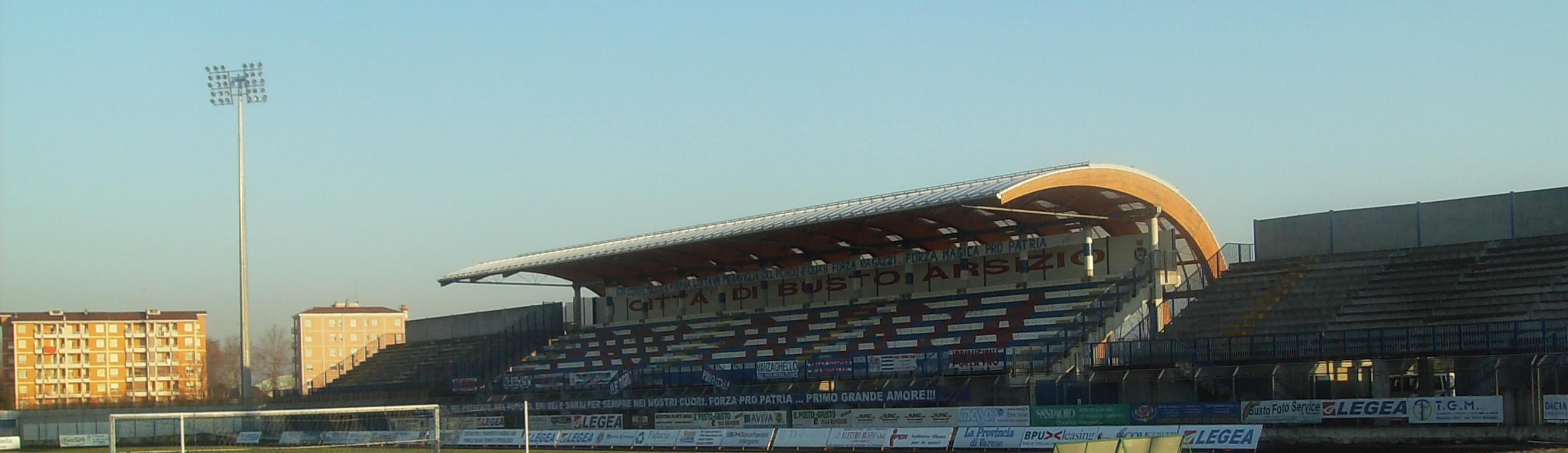
Stadio Carlo Speroni, the home ground of Pro Patria

Busto Arsizio is the host for the Federazione Italiana Sport Croquet, the lawns being located at the Cascina del Lupo Sporting Centre just outside the city.

Pro Patria football club plays in Busto Arsizio at the Stadio Carlo Speroni.

The football team has qualified for access to the Serie B National Championship many times, but the team has not been part of the division since 1965–1966.

Pro Patria A.R.C. Busto Arsizio is the athletic society.

Yamamay Busto Arsizio is the main volleyball society of the city and plays in the first national division.

One of the most important athletes of Busto Arsizio is Umberto Pelizzari, born on August 28, 1965, widely considered among the best freedivers of all time. Other important athletes are the former twirling world champion Chiara Stefanazzi and the former footballers Carlo Reguzzoni, Antonio Azimonti, Aldo Marelli, Egidio Calloni, Natale Masera and Michele Ferri.

Busto Arsizio is also the city where the Italian volleyball player Caterina Bosetti was born.

== Notable people ==
- Biagio Bellotti (1714–1786), Italian painter and artist
- Edoardo Gabardi (1871–1962), Italian businessman and philanthropist
- Mario Caccia (1920), Italian footballer
- Edoardo Lualdi Gabardi (1931–2026), Italian racing driver
- Ercole Spada (1937–2025), Italian automobile designer
- Mina (1940), Italian singer
- Manuela Maffioli (1971), Italian politician; Member of the Chamber of Deputies
- Massimiliano Gioni (1973), Italian art curator, art critic, and artistic director

== International relations ==
=== Twin towns – sister cities ===
Busto Arsizio is twinned with:

- Domodossola, Italy
- Épinay-sur-Seine, France
- Nacfa, Eritrea
- Cixi, China

== See also ==
- La Famiglia Bustocca
- Churches of Busto Arsizio

== Bibliography ==
- Bellotti, Adelio; Bernocchi, Achille; Riccardi, Luigi (1997). Busto Arsizio in cartolina: I luoghi cari, 1895-1950. Azzate: Macchione.
- Luigi Ferrario (1864). Busto Arsizio. Notizie storico-statistiche. Busto Arsizio: Tipografia Sociale.
- Franco Bertolli, Umberto Colombo (1990). La peste del 1630 a Busto Arsizio. Busto Arsizio: Bramante.
- J. W. S. Johnsson (1924). Storia della peste avvenuta nel Borgo di Busto Arsizio 1630. Copenaghen: H. Koppel.
- Giampiero Magugliani, ed. (1985). Busto Arsizio. Storia di una città attraverso le sue vie e le sue piazze. Busto Arsizio: Comune di Busto Arsizio.
