= Church of San Gregorio, Busto Arsizio =

Roman Catholic Church in Busto Arsizio, Italy

Coordinates: 45.6099°N 8.8537°E

Church of San Gregorio
- Church of San Gregorio Magno in Camposanto
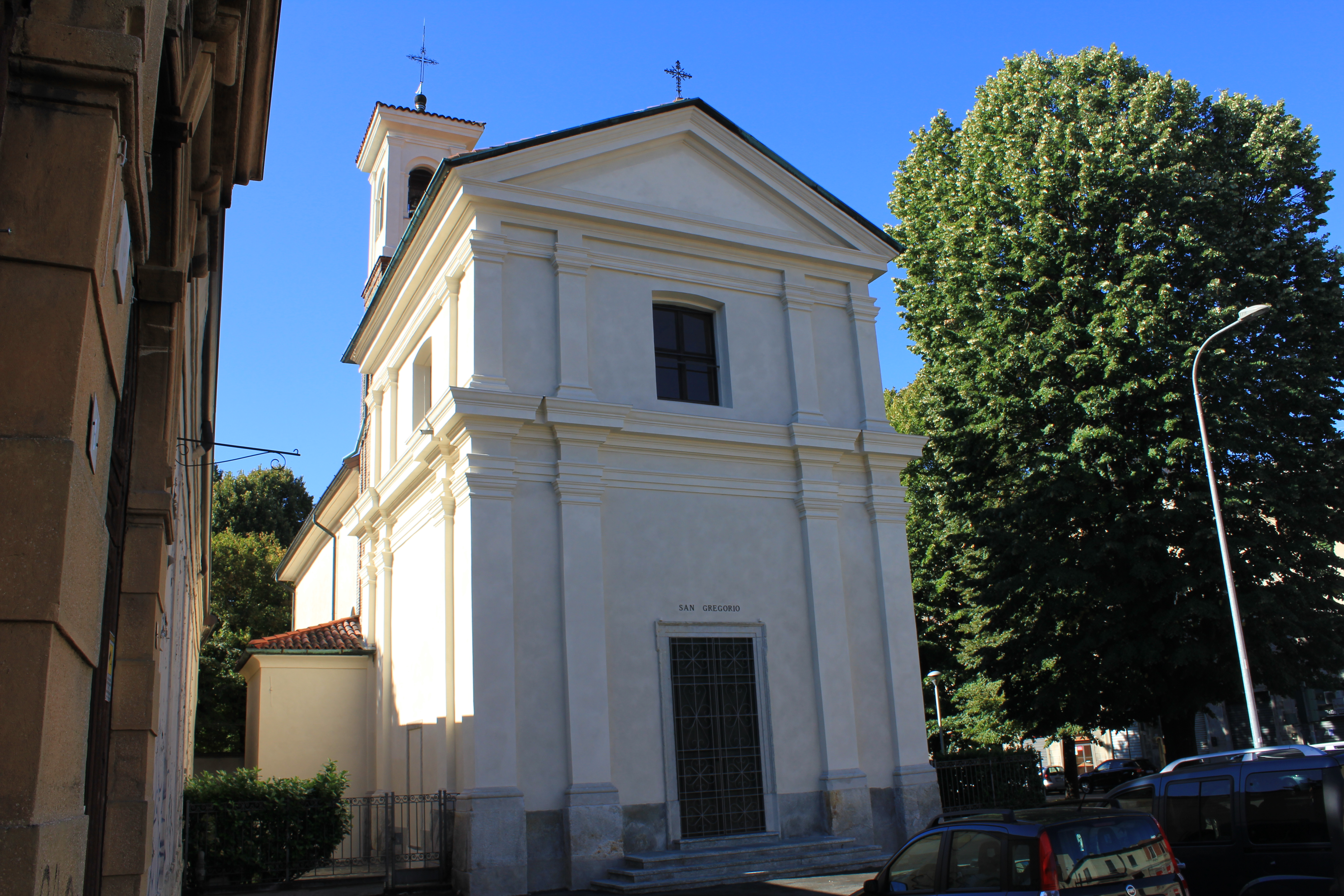
- Church of San Gregorio
- Location: Busto Arsizio, Lombardy
- Country: Italy
- Denomination: Roman Catholic

History
- Founded: 10 May 1632
- Dedication: Saint Gregory
- Dedicated: 1659
- Consecrated: 1659

Administration
- Diocese: Diocese of Milan
- Parish: San Giovanni Battista

The Church of San Gregorio Magno in Camposanto, more commonly known as the Church of San Gregorio, is a Roman Catholic Church in Busto Arsizio, located near the Piazza Trento Trieste. The church was constructed between 1632 and 1659.

== History ==
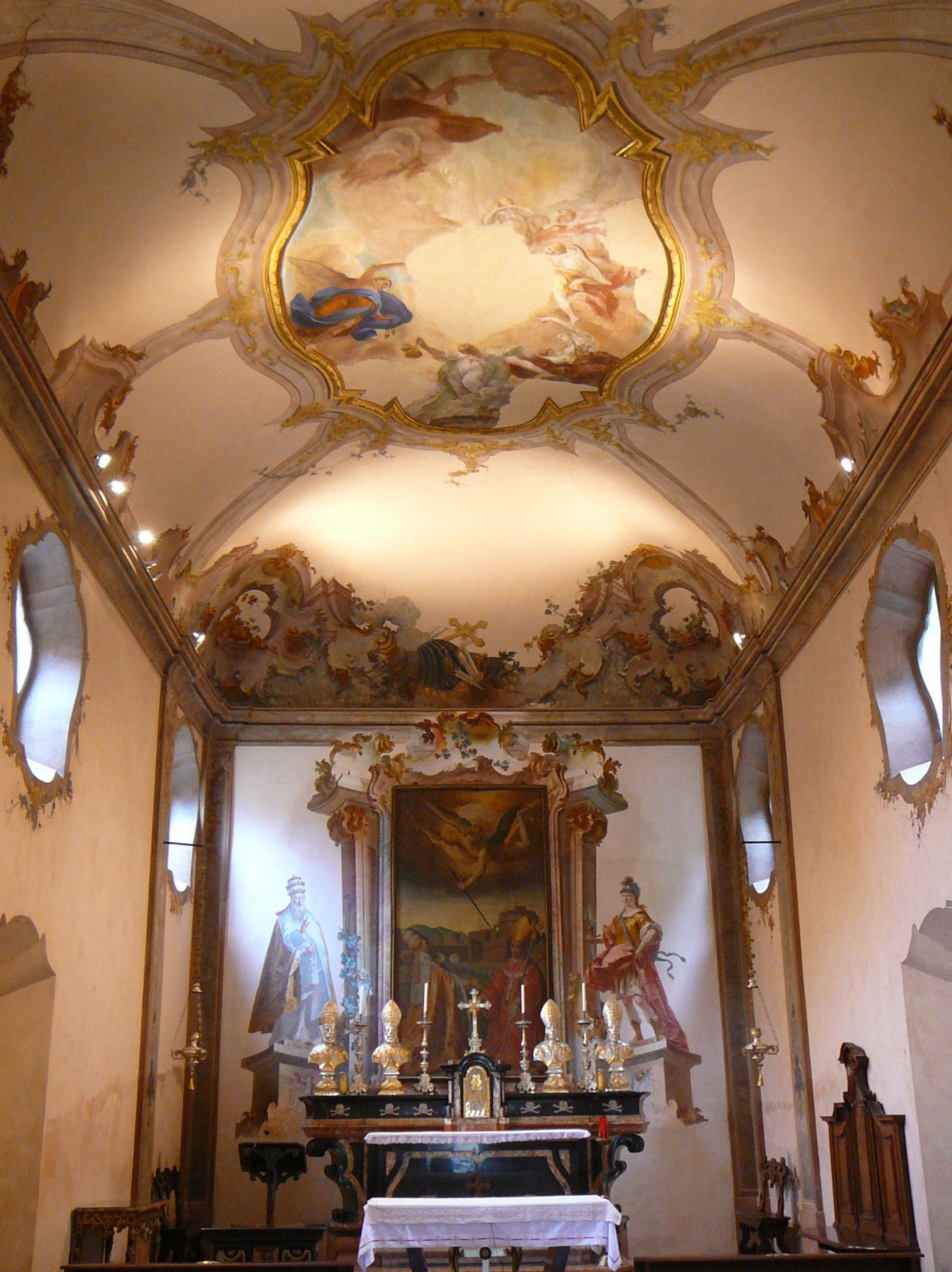
The church's interior

Construction of the church began after the 1630 plague epidemic. Busto Arsizio built a cemetery and a lazaretto due to the large number of people infected. This lazaretto and cemetery were located in the current Parco Ugo Foscolo. On 10 May 1632 construction began.

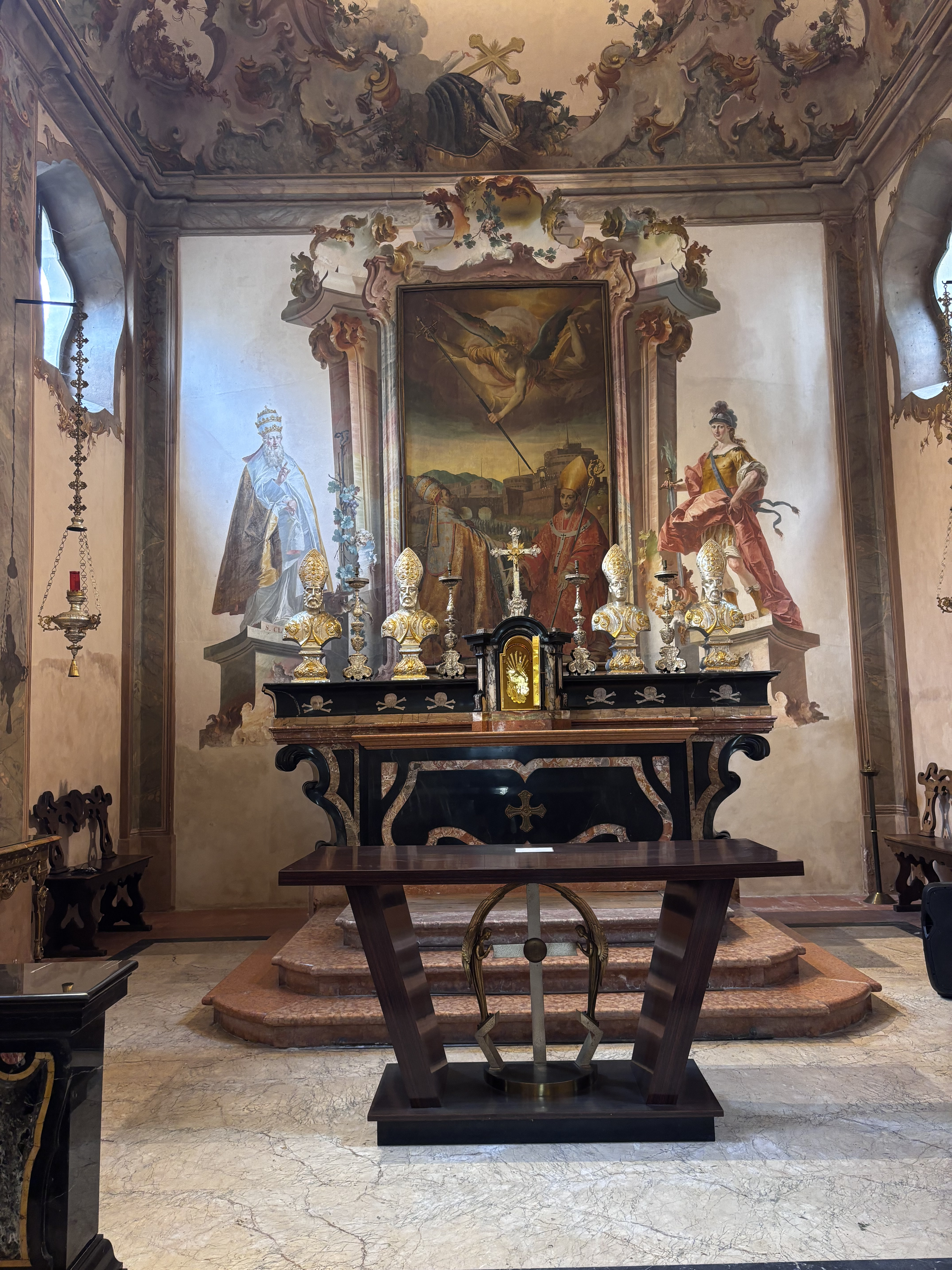
Altar of San Gregorio

Construction though was quickly halted and abandoned for 15 years, commencing once again in the late 1640s. Between 1657 and 1659 the main central part of the church was constructed, along with a sacristy and a bell tower. The presbytery was the last part of the church to be constructed, with construction concluding in 1711. It was designed by Giovanni Comino. In 1719 a new sacristy was constructed, followed by the construction of a new bell tower. In 1736 a new marble altar was constructed and consecrated.

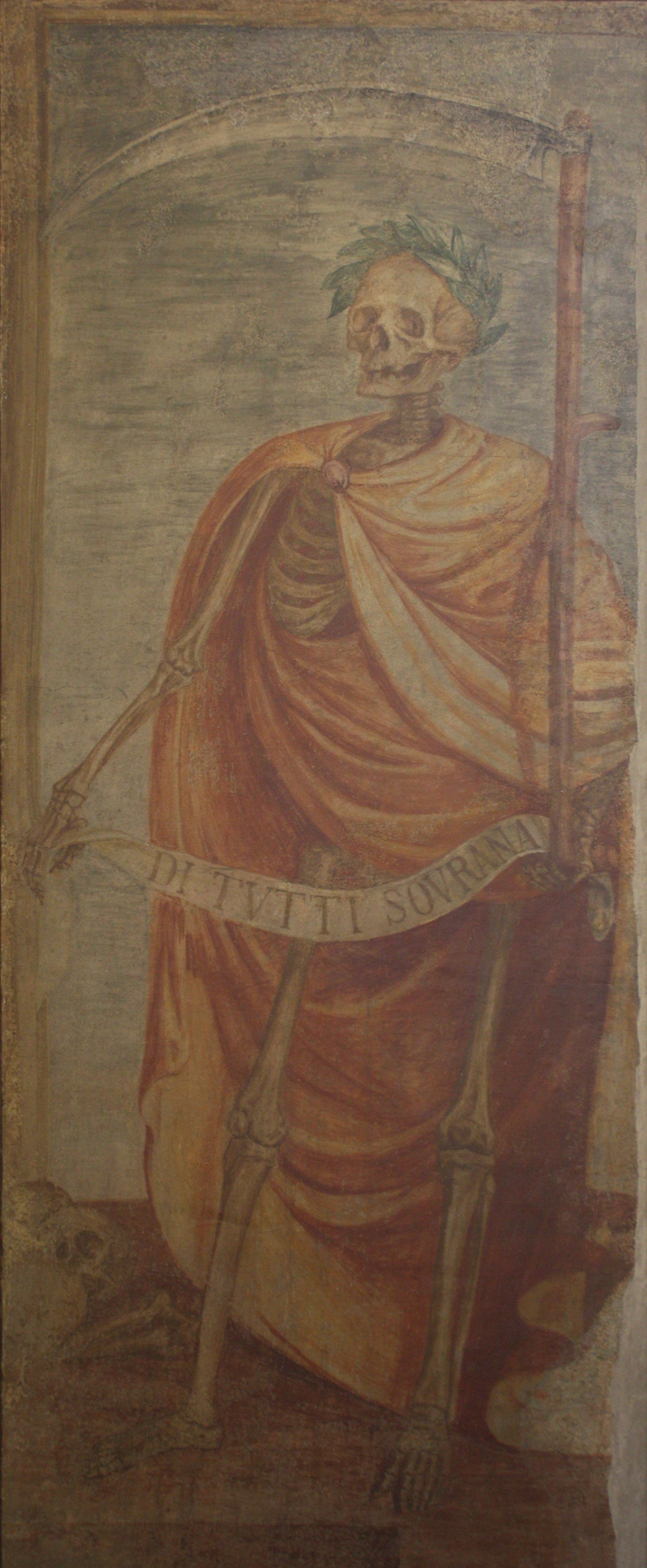
Fresco by Bellotti depicting 'death', which once was located on the Mortuary of the Basilica of San Giovanni Battista

The church’s interior was decorated in 1745 by Biagio Bellotti. In 1790 a connection between the church and the cemetery was made. In 1831 the church’s bell tower received the bell from the church of Sant’Antonio Abate. In 1859, an oratorio was opened.

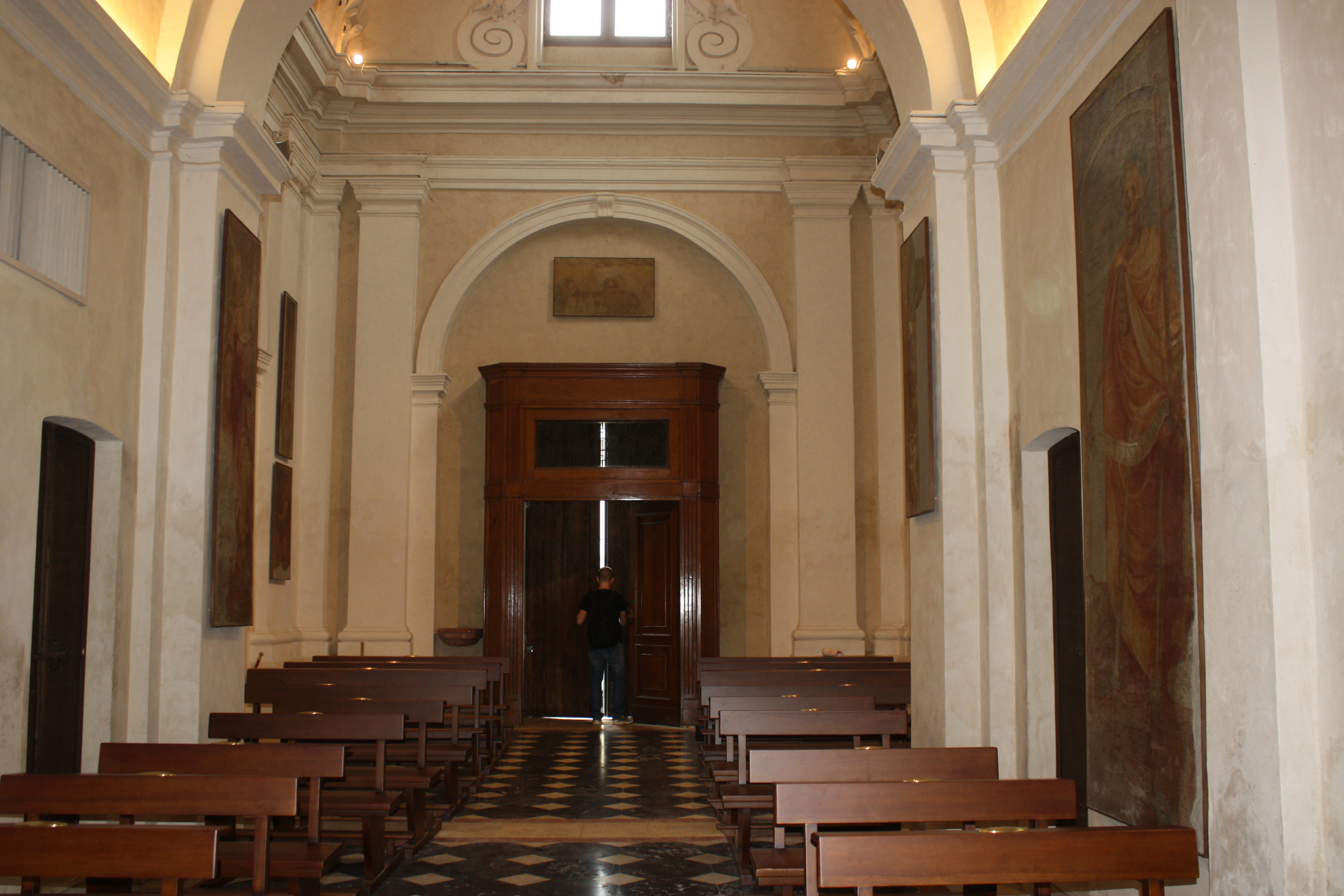
View of the interior of the church

Between 1924 and 1926, a new sacristy was added at the back of the church and renovations were carried out, including the relocation of the altar to the back of the church, where the altarpiece commemorates the miracle of St Gregory the Great, who, in 590, after a solemn procession, managed to stop the plague. Outside, near the western wall of the church, a copy of the votive column was placed in 1941.

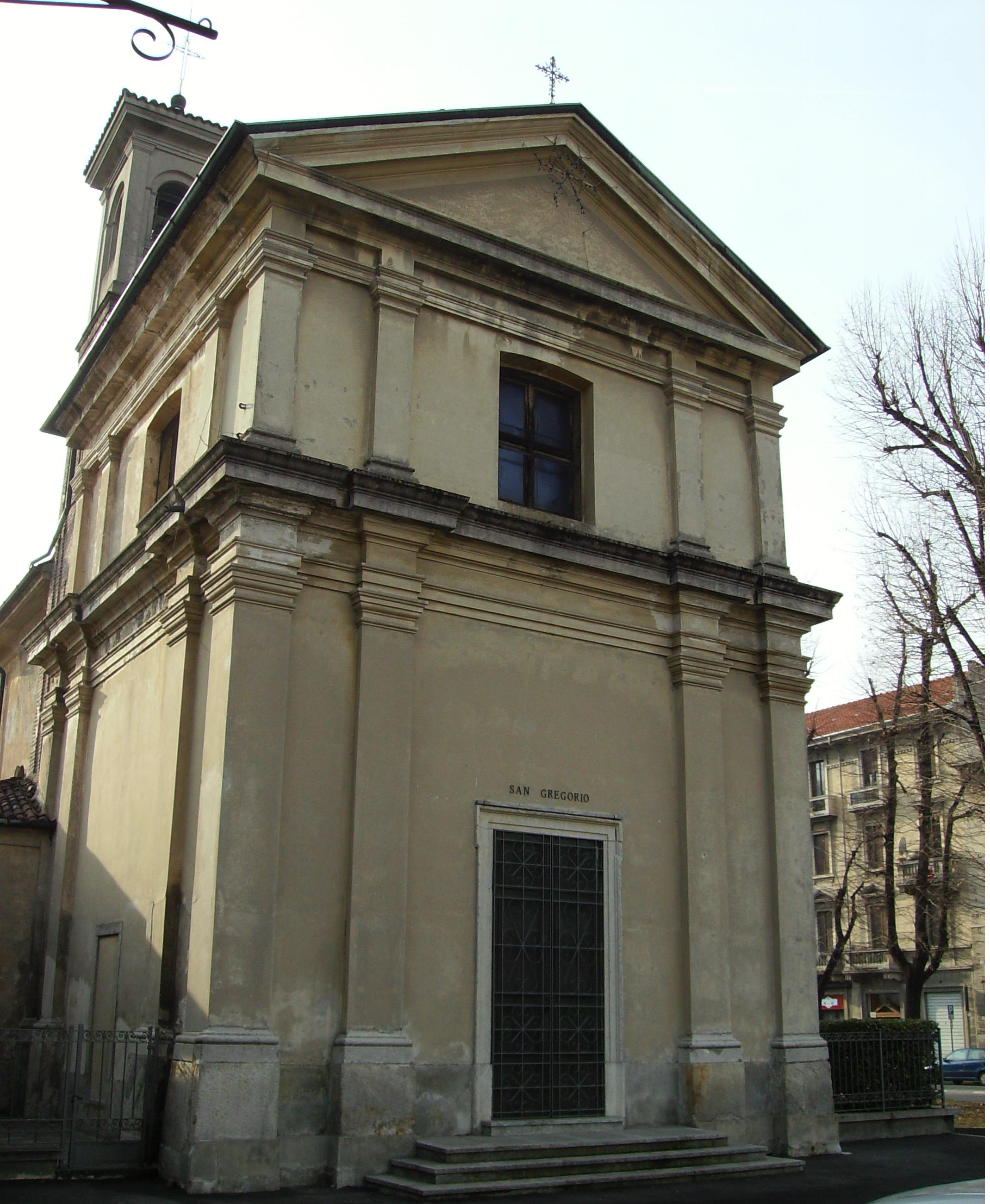
The church in 2007, before the exterior renovations.

In the 20th century, Bellotti’s frescos were restored by Tito Poloni, and were once again restored in 1969, 1983, and 1991. The church’s exterior was restored between 2010 and 2012 by Augusto Spada, on the orders of Monsignor Franco Agnesi. In 2012, when restoration work was completed, St. Gregory's became the first religious building in Lombardy equipped with district heating.
