= Basilica of San Giovanni Battista, Busto Arsizio =

Basilica in Busto Arsizio, Italy

Coordinates: 45.6121°N 8.8525°E

Basilica of San Giovanni Battista
- The Prepositural Collegiate Basilica of San Giovanni Battista
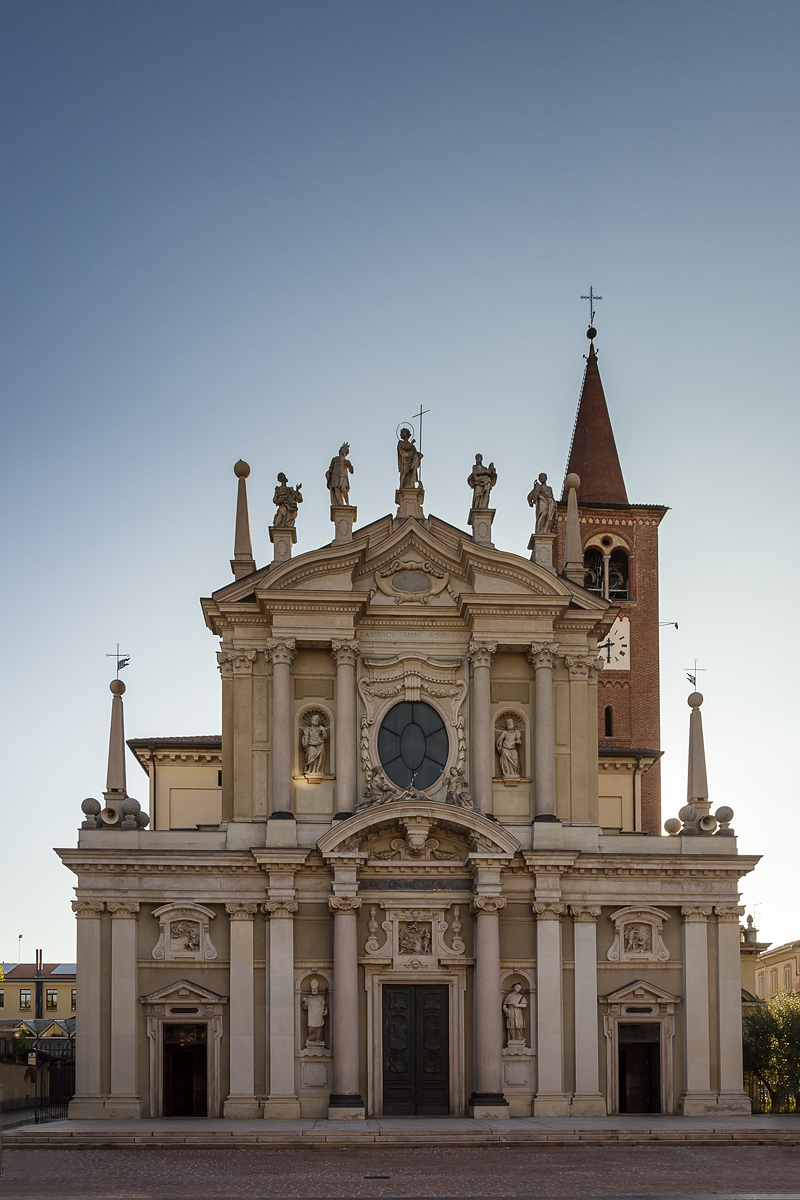
- Basilica of San Giovanni Battista
- Location: Busto Arsizio, Lombardy
- Country: Italy
- Denomination: Roman Catholic

History
- Founded: 1233

Architecture
- Architect: Francesco Maria Richini
- Style: Baroque
- Years built: 1609–1635

Administration
- Diocese: Diocese of Milan
- Parish: San Giovanni Battista

Clergy
- Priest: Mons. Severino Pagani

The Prepositural Collegiate Basilica of San Giovanni Battista is a Catholic church in Busto Arsizio, dedicated to one of the patron saints of the city. Like the Church of San Michele Arcangelo, this building also stands on the remains of a small Lombard chapel about eight metres wide.

In 1948 the church was elevated to the dignity of minor basilica. The bell tower was constructed from 1400 to 1418, and is the oldest part of the church.

== History ==
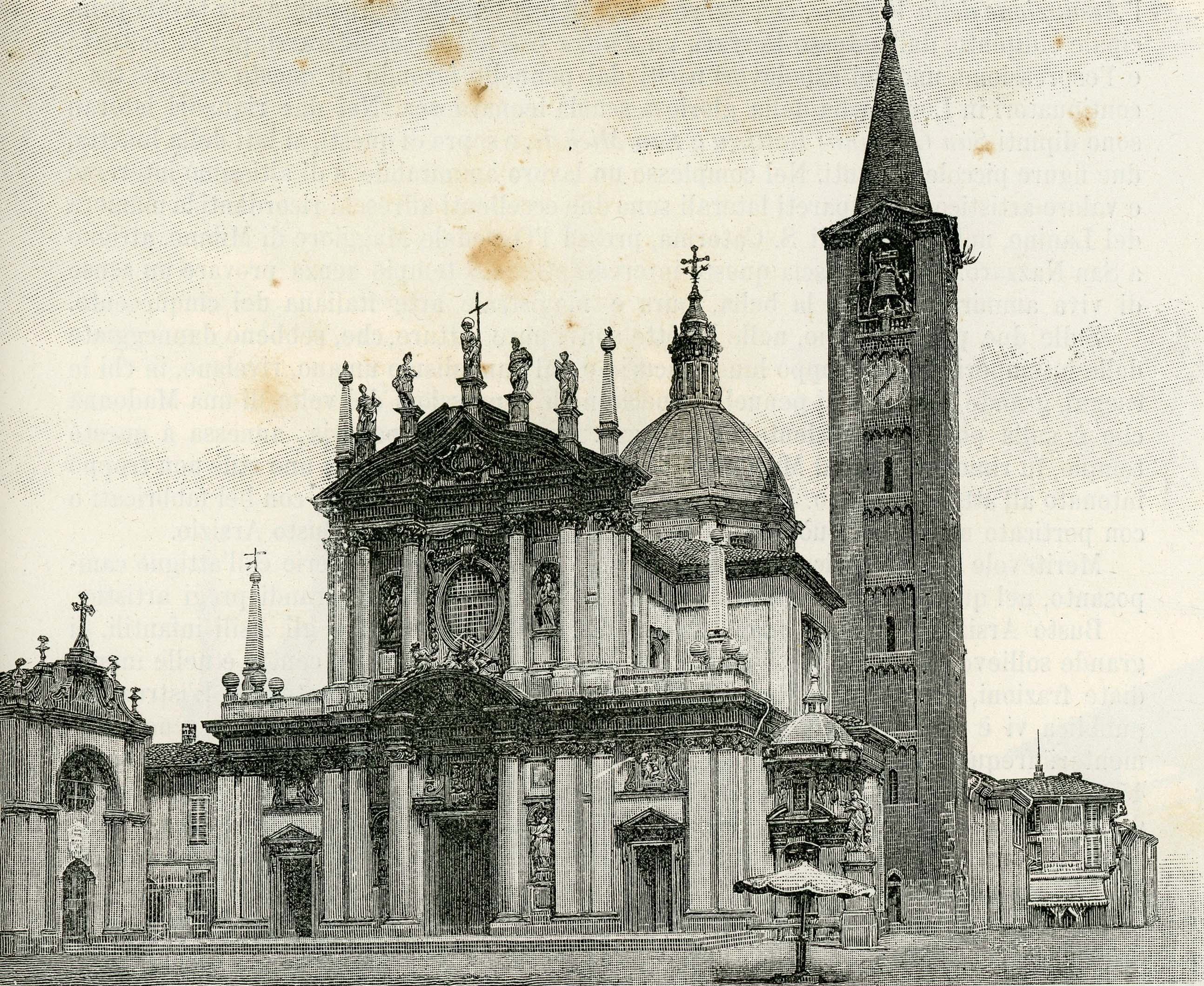
The Basilica in 1894

=== The Medieval Church ===
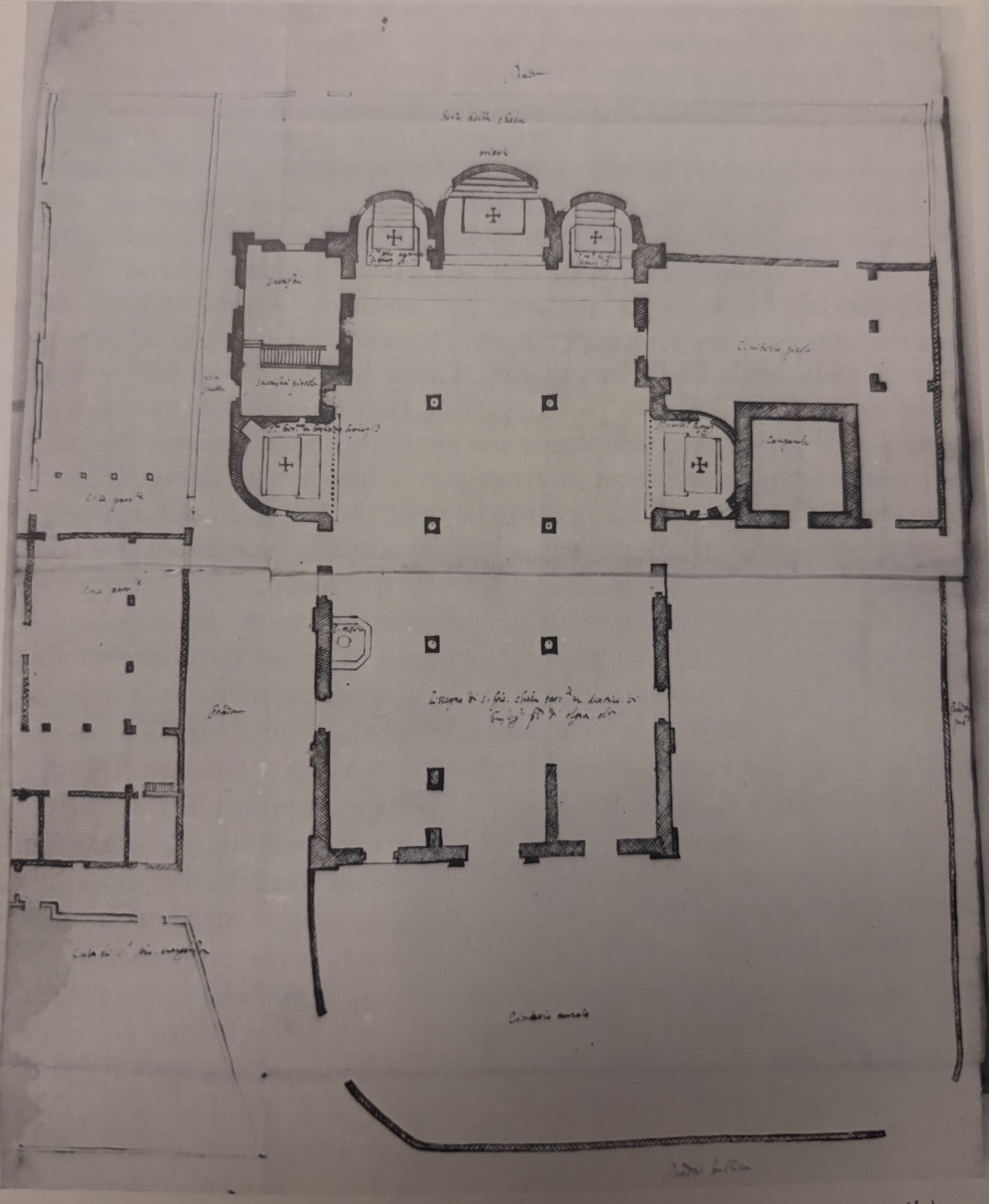
The plan of the medieval church, demolished in 1609.

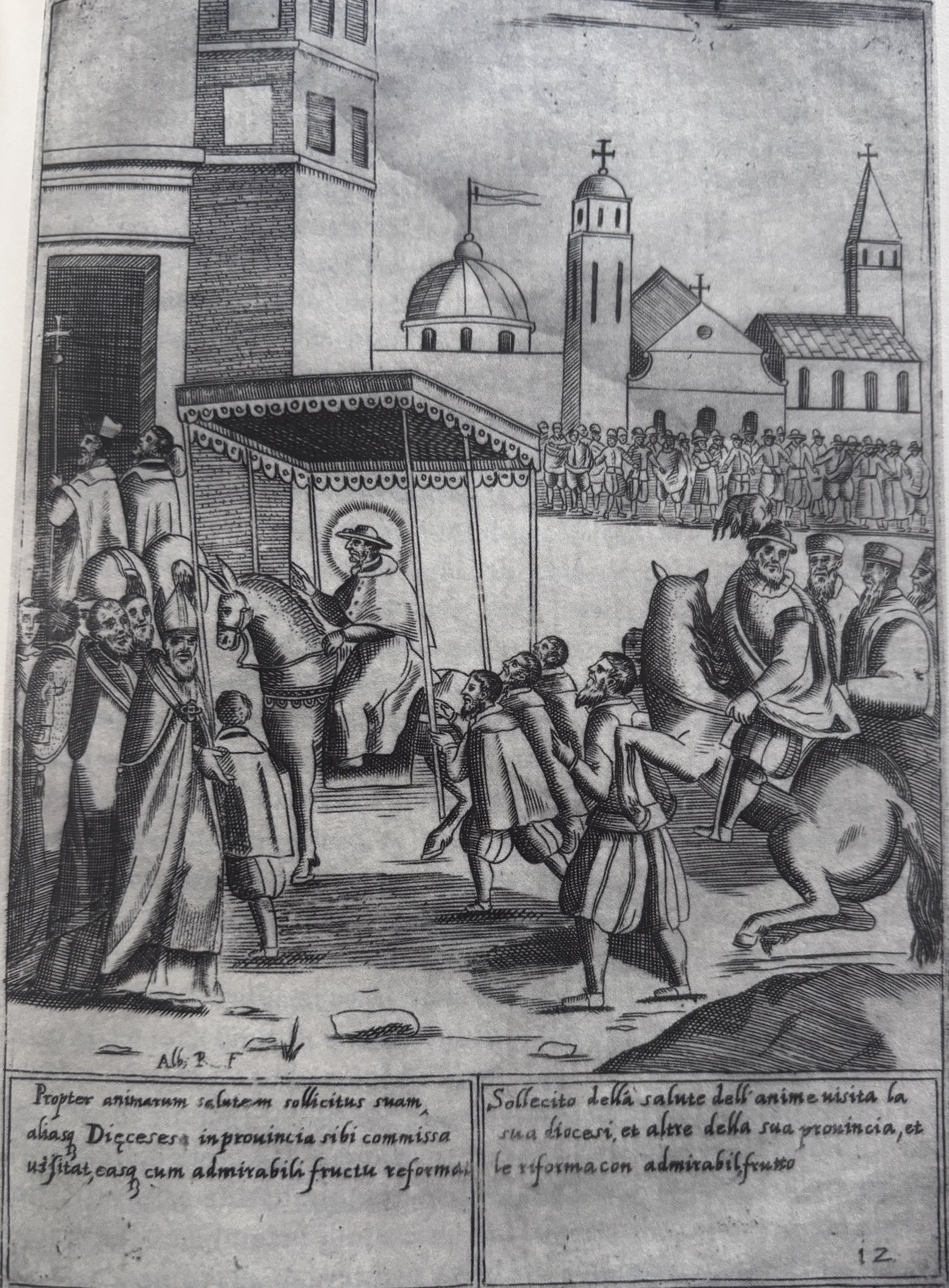
San Carlo Borromeo's visit to Busto Arsizio in 1583. In the background the church in the centre is probably the church of San Giovanni Battista before its reconstruction.

The first mention of the church dates back to 1233, and was under the leadership of a priest named Domenico. Another document, dated 1243, states that the church housed the Confraternity of Sant'Orsola, as well as the burials of the Bonsignori, Crespi, Ferrario, Pozzi, and Rauli families (all still present in Busto Arsizio to this day). The church was expanded at the end of the 13th century. On 29 January 1346, the main altar of the church was consecrated by Brother Francesco, Bishop of Pistoia. A few days later, Don Giovanni de Restagnis, priest of Borsano, consecrated a small chapel adjacent to the church, dedicated to the Holy Virgin Mary. The church was decorated in the 16th century. In February 1582, the church was visited by Charles Borromeo, and just one year later, the church became its own pieve, breaking away from the Pieve of Olgiate Olona. Charles Borromeo also appointed Busto Arsizio's first Provost, Ippolito Seta. The church was constructed in a romanesque style, and had three Apses. The church was expanded once more, and the last pastoral visit occurred in 1603, six years before the old church was demolished, when the pieve was visited by Alessandro Mazenta, sent by Federico Borromeo. Plans to demolish and reconstruct the church were approved in 1609.

=== The Current Church ===
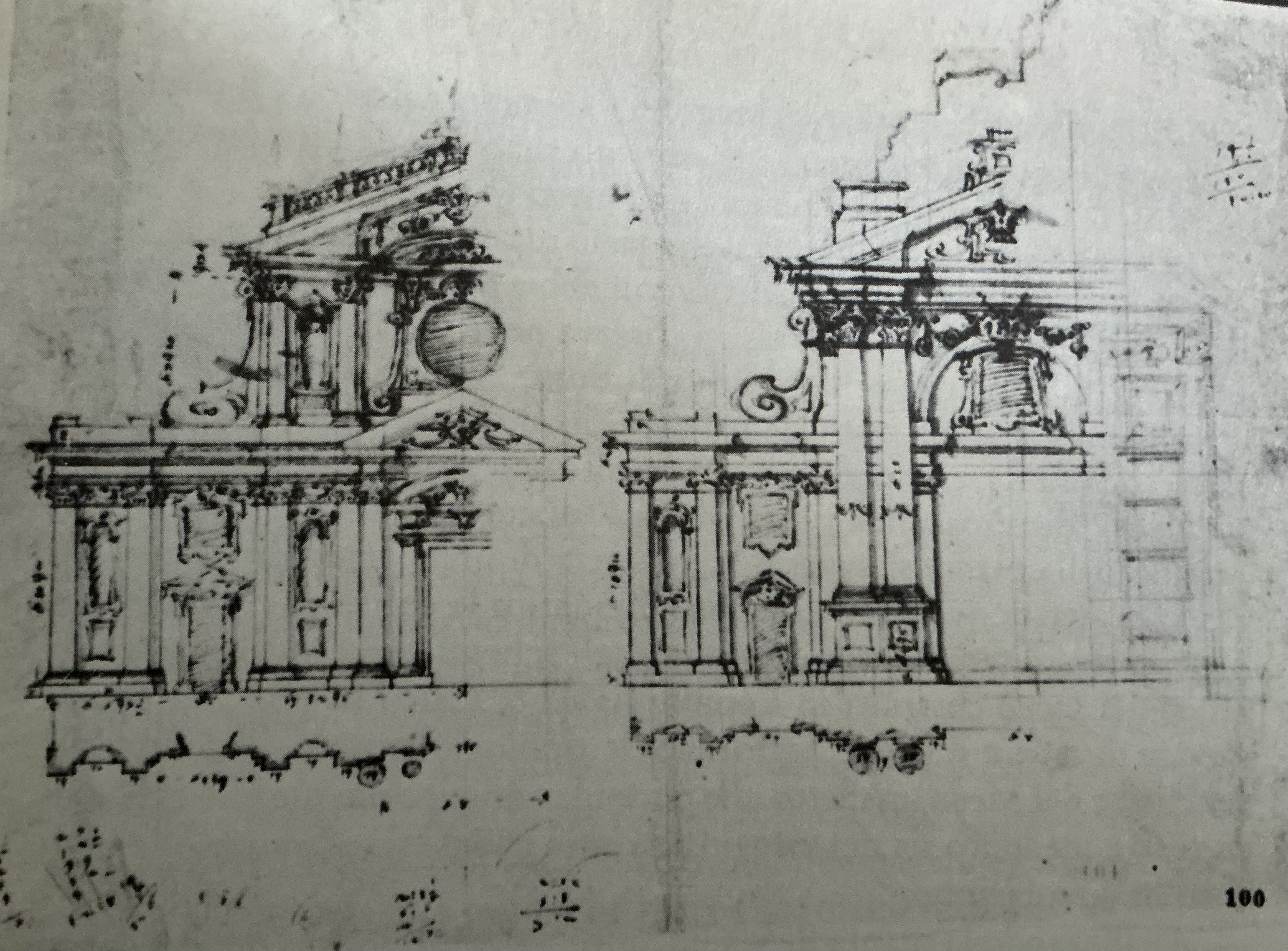
Richini's plans for the façade of the Church

The current church was designed by Francesco Maria Richini, who would later design the nearby church of San Michele Arcangelo. The first stone was placed on 26 May 1609 by the Provost of Busto Arsizio, Paolo Gerolamo Candiani. Subsequently the bones of the old cemetery (located at the base of the bell tower) were moved to construct the perimeter and the foundations of the new church. Construction began that year, with the construction of the new sacristy and the chapel dedicated to Sant'Ambrogio. In 1610 the apse of the old church was demolished. In October 1612 the construction of the transept had begun, and by 1615 the foundations of the new façade had been laid. On 24 June 1614, in occasion of the Feast of San Giovanni Battista, the Provost, Giovanni Antonio Armiraglio, celebrated the first mass in the new church. Construction of the church continued in March 1622, with the commencement of the construction of the roof. The organ was constructed in 1617, with the previous organ sold to the church of Inveruno. In 1628 construction of the dome began but was abandoned just a year later due to the plague. It was in 1634 that construction resumed, with the construction of the dome concluding probably after 1635. The construction of the church concluded in the 1640s, and was consecrated by the Bishop of Bobbio, Francesco Maria Abbiati, on 29 July 1646. In 1948 the church was elevated to the status of Minor Basilica by Pope Pius XII. Some renovations were conducted in 1950. The piazza of the church was one of the sites were the Olympic flame of the 2026 Winter Olympics passed.

== Architectural Design ==
=== Exterior ===
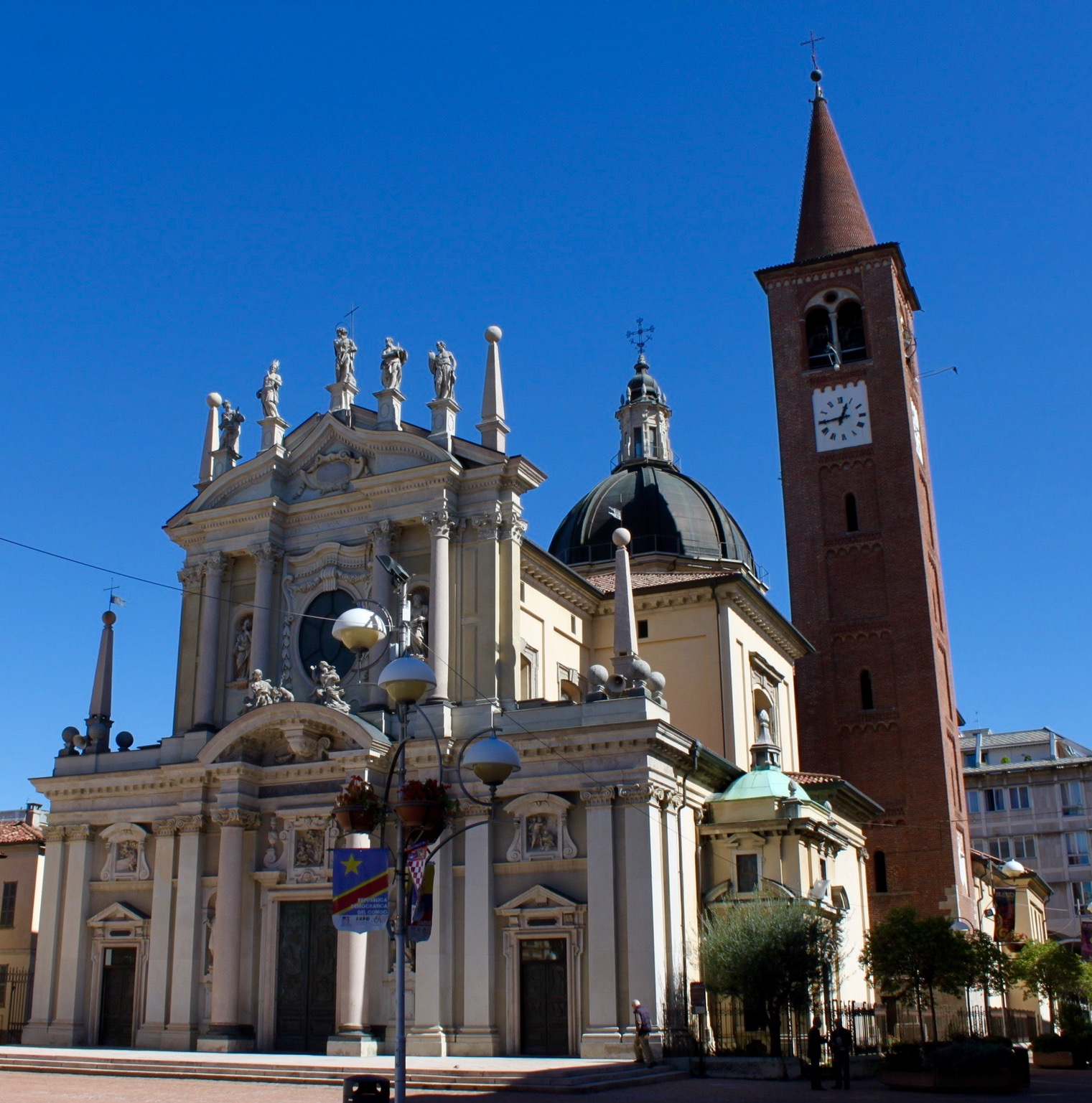
Façade of the church

==== Façade ====
The imposing façade consists of a lower order of coupled Ionic style pilasters, a prothyrum with an arched pediment, doors made of copper and bronze with bas-reliefs depicting the life of St. John the Baptist (work of Enrico Astorri from 1908), statues of St. Ambrose, St. Charles Borromeo, Faith and Charity and countless other works from various eras. However, the façade was still incomplete: the upper part was completed between 1699 and 1701 by Domenico Valmagini, who inserted a large oval window, a double-curved broken pediment, the statues of St. Peter St. Paul and four prophets (all works by Giovanni Pozzi), and the central statue of St. John the Baptist (by Siro Zanelli), which represents the highest point of the façade.

==== Bell Tower ====
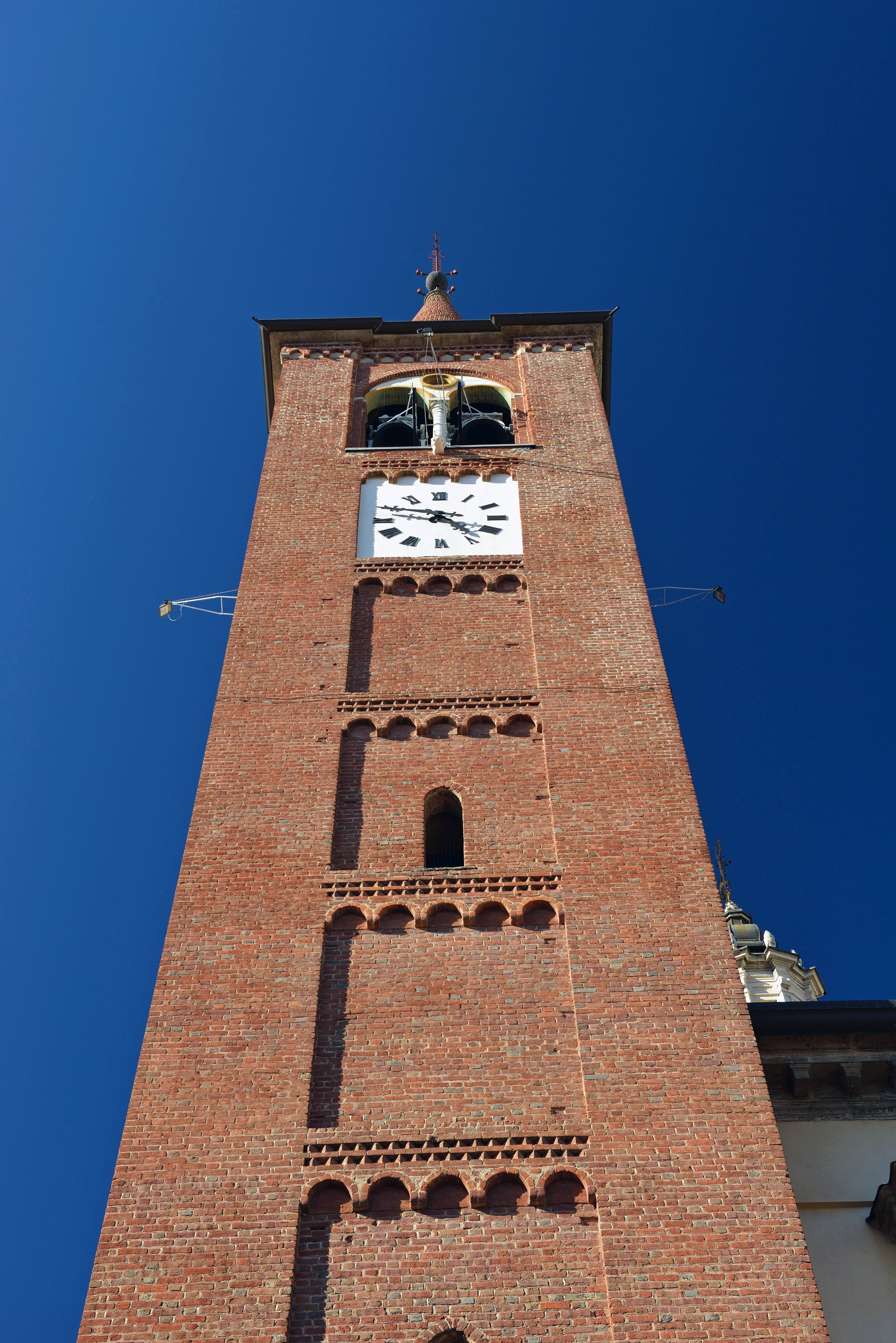

Built in the early years of the 15th century, the basilica's bell tower was built for two reasons: one was obviously religious since in 1400 the town of Busto Arsizio was experiencing a period of plague that increased religious commotion to the point of building a concrete work that symbolised the devotion of the people of Busto Arsizio. The second was military: the construction of the bell tower was, in fact, partly financed by the municipality, as it could have been used as a watchtower for defensive purposes since the church was located not far from the centre of the rectangle of fortifications. In 1409, the main bell was cast and placed on the bell tower, while the construction was completed in 1418, the year Pope Martin V came to Milan for the consecration of the high altar of the Duomo.

=== Interior ===
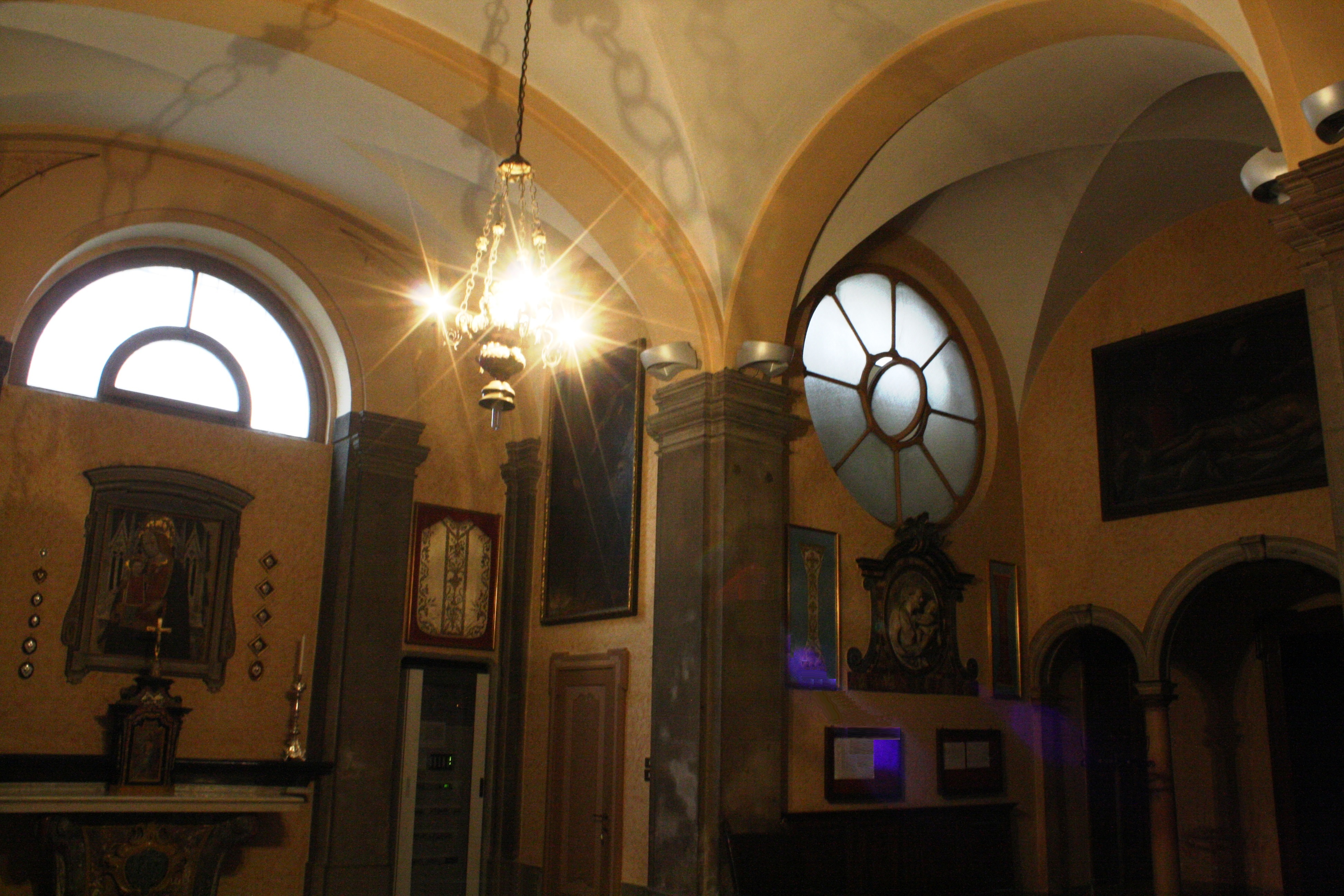
The Sacristy

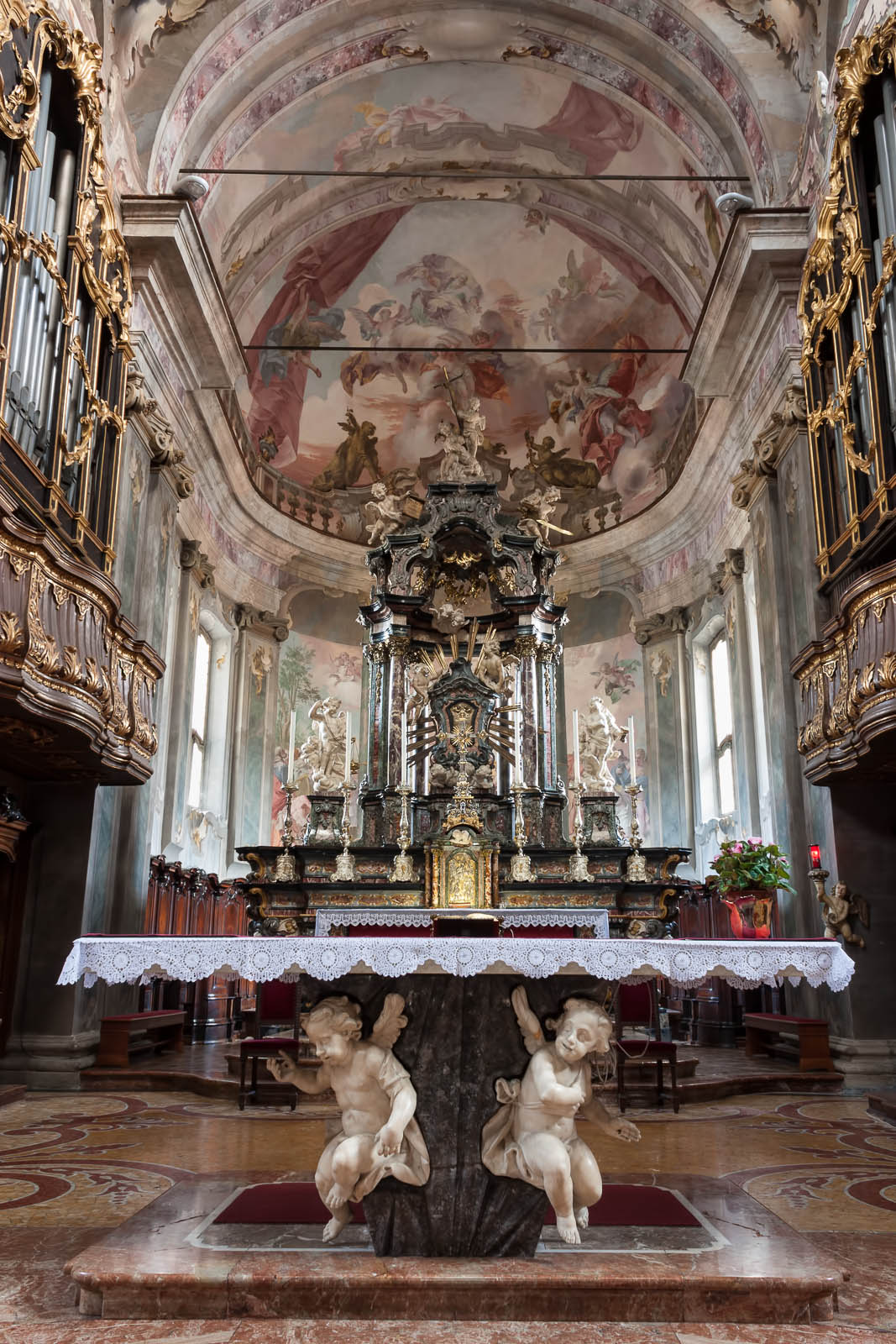

Inside, the church is covered with barrel vaults and ribbed vaults, the three naves are separated by rows of Ionic style piers and columns. Under the arches hang large canvases depicting the life of St. John the Baptist, painted between the end of the 17th century and the beginning of the 18th century by unknown artists, with the exception of Jesus with the disciples of the Baptist and Herodias and Salome with the head of the Baptist, attributed to Carlo Preda. The left transept hosts, instead, two frescoes of the 17th century (Rest during the Flight into Egypt and Nativity), attributed to Antonio Crespi Castoldi. More recent (between 1904 and 1923) are the decorations with pinkish grit and variegated marble (by Giuseppe Cerami and Pirro Bottaro) and the frescoes of the dome (Glorification of the Baptist), the pendentives (Evangelists) and the vaults (Blessed Juliana and Blessed Bernardino, Immaculate Conception, The Eucharist and The Pope) and the minor transept (Four Prophets) all works by Carlo Grossi, as well as the Way of the Cross in bronze and the portals by Enrico Astorri (1908). On the other hand, carved wooden works such as the pulpit, the choir and the compass date back to the 18th century. Over a period of eight years, between 1757 and 1765, Biagio Bellotti realised the frescoes of the apsidal area of the church. On the vault of the chancel is depicted the Glory of St. Sabinus, in the apse basin Paradise and on the wall of the apse The Baptism of Jesus Christ in the waters of the Jordan.

=== "Mortuary" ===
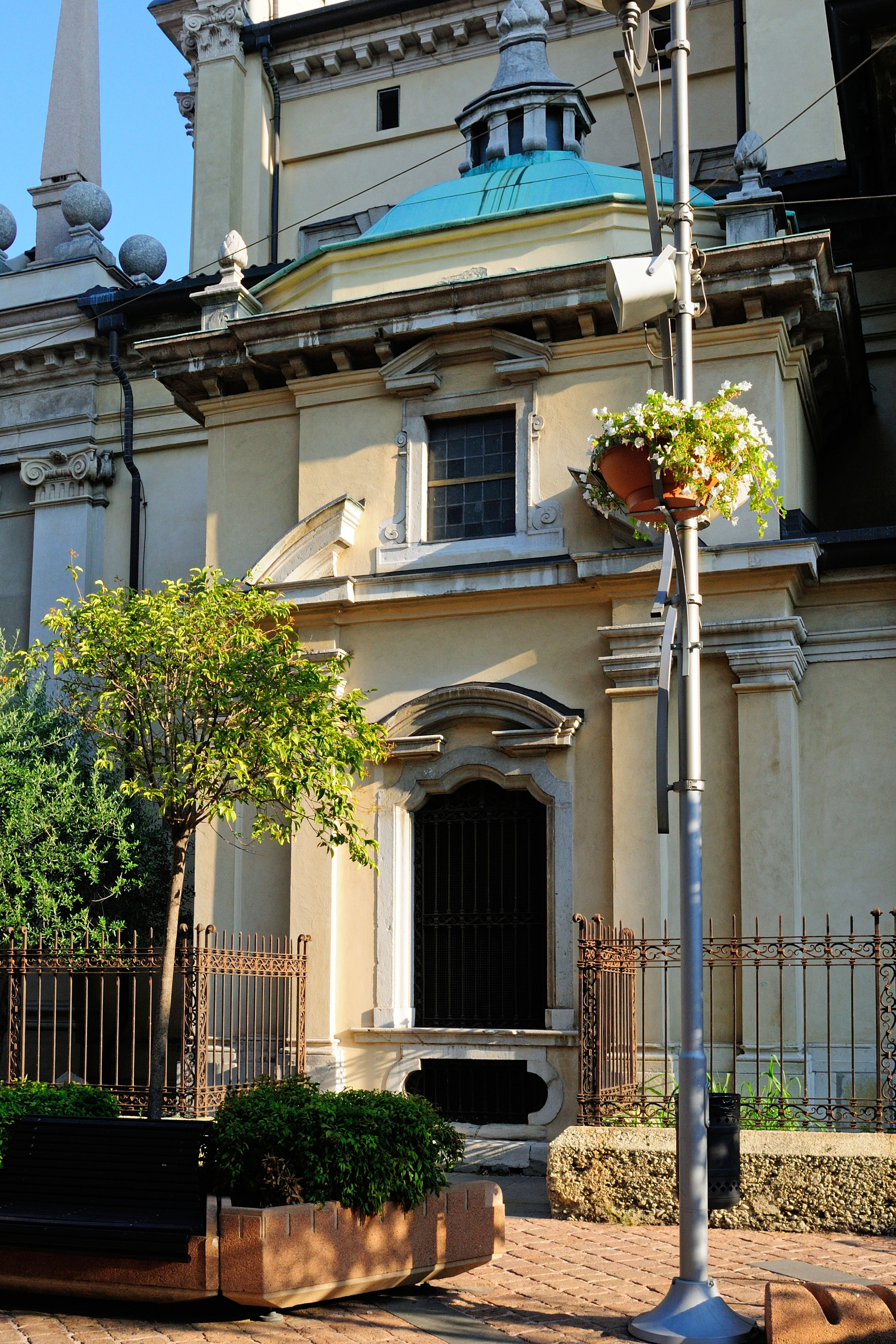
The mortuary

Outside the church, on the right-hand side, is the "mortorio", a small temple by an unknown author, painted between 6 September 1689 and 2 November 1692, which was meant to remind passers-by of the mystery of death by displaying skulls, still visible today from Via Milano. Inside, there are paintings of angels and symbolism on the Passion. Paintings were also visible outside, works by the brothers Ambrogio Gelli, Francesco and Biagio Bellotti (the latter grandfather of the Bustocco painter of the same name), depicting the ages of man, the various aspects of death, virtues, purgatory and weeping angels, removed in 1975 and transferred to the Church of San Gregorio Magno in Camposanto.

== Baptistery of San Filippo Neri ==
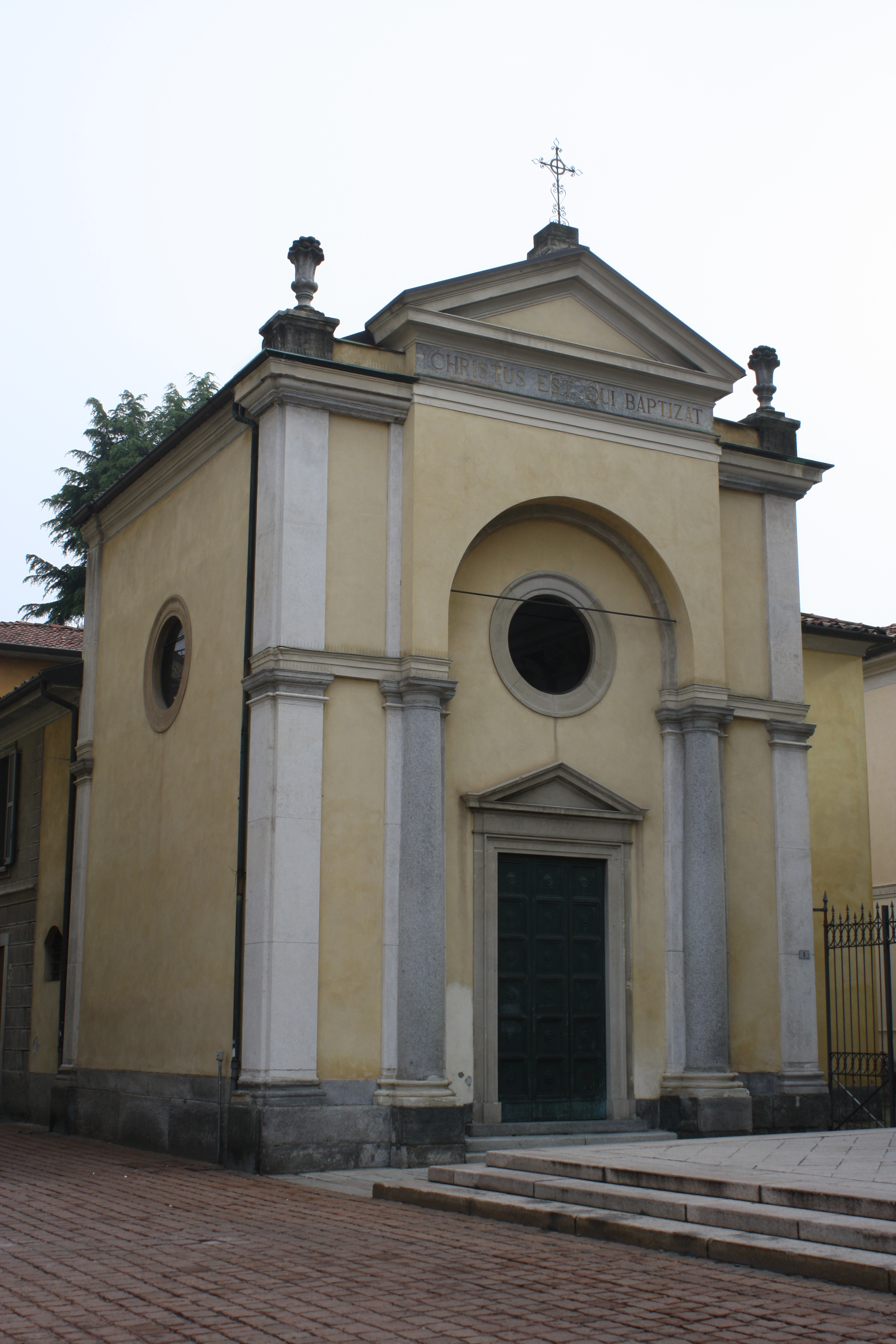
The baptistery

Adjacent to the Basilica is a baptistery dedicated to Saint Filippo Neri. It was designed by local architect and artist Biagio Bellotti and built between 1744 and 1751. The church not only houses a baptistery, but also 5 tombs and several bones, located underneath it. It was renovated in the 1990s, and in 1992 it became the Baptistery of the basilica. Nowadays it is used as a baptistery, but also hosts exhibitions.

== Provosts of Busto Arsizio ==
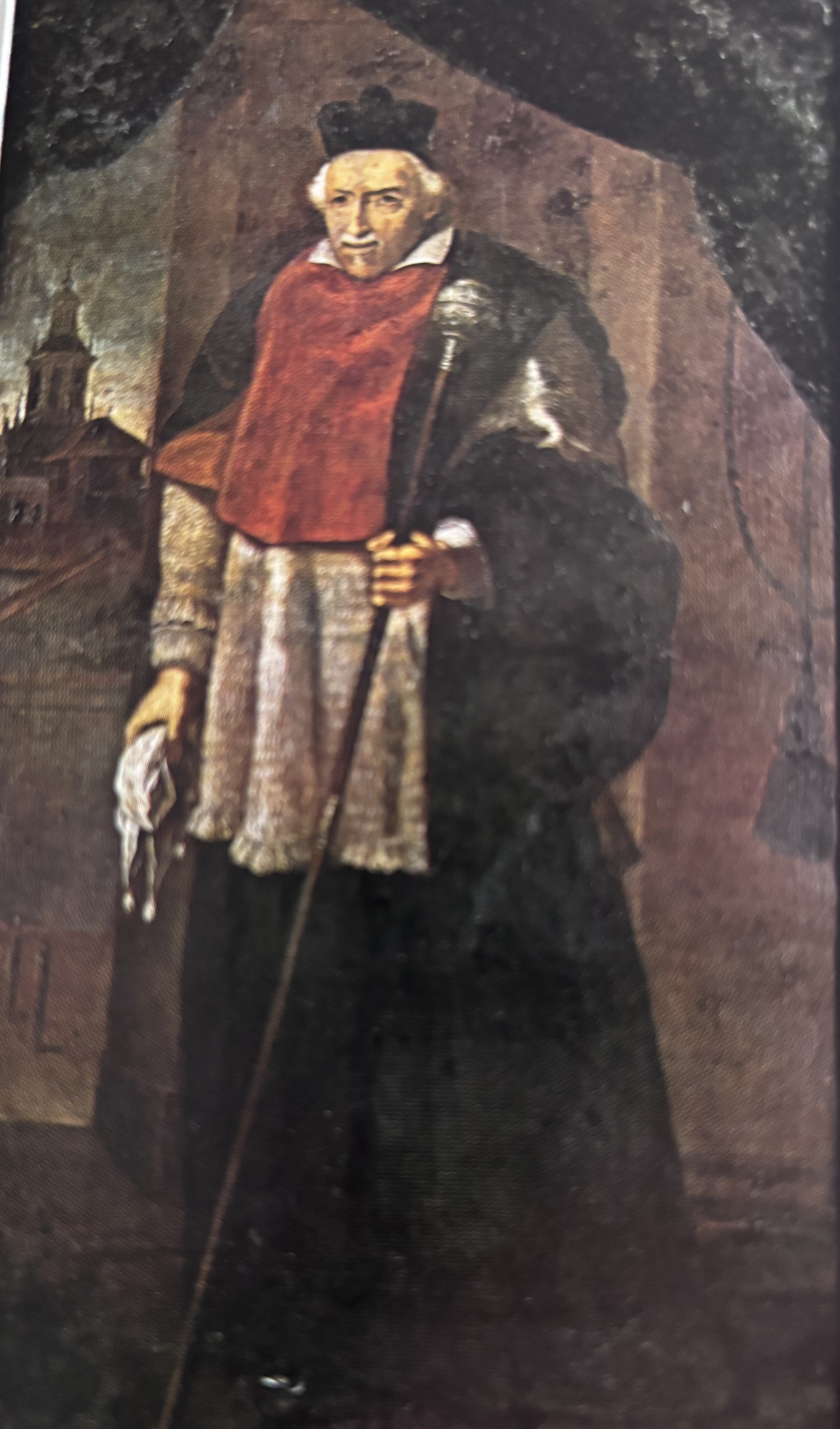
Giovanni Antonio Armiraglio, Provost from 1611 to 1658

Since 1583, by order of the archbishop of Milan, the priest of San Giovanni is also the Provost of Busto Arsizio. The current Provost is Mons. Severino Pagani, who has served as Provost since 2012. Below is a chronological list of all Provosts:

=== 16th century ===
- Ippolito Seta (1583–1589)
- Camillo Frigo (1589–1593)
- Paolo Gerolamo Candiani (1593–1611)

=== 17th century ===
- Giovanni Antonio Armiraglio (1611–1658)
- Francesco Bossi (1658–1684)
- Girolamo Pozzi (1684–1693)
- Felice Curioni (1693–1716)

=== 18th century ===
- Alessio Custodi (1716–1728)
- Carl'Antonio Ranzani (1728–1735)
- Pietro Borroni (1735–1779)
- Giovanni Francesco Rossi (1779–1787)
- Antonio Giani (1787–1807)

=== 19th century ===
- Giovanni Maggi (1804–1832)
- Bartolomeo Piazza (1832–1872)
- Giuseppe Tettamanti (1872–1901)

=== 20th century ===
- Carlo Castelli (1901–1906)
- Paolo Borroni (1906–1935)
- Norberto Perini (1935–1942)
- Giovanni Galimberti (1942–1966)
- Marino Colombo (1967–1986)
- Claudio Livetti (1986–2008)

=== 21st century ===
- Franco Agnesi (2008–2012)
- Severino Pagani (2012–)

== See also ==
- Churches of Busto Arsizio

== Sources ==
- Bertolli, Franco; Pacciarotti, Giuseppe (1981), La Basilica di s.Giovanni battista in Busto Arsizio, Busto Arsizio: Libreria della Basilica
