= Church of St. Michael Archangel, Busto Arsizio =

Church in Busto Arsizio, Italy

Coordinates: 45.612702°N 8.845845°E

Church of Saint Michael Archangel
- Provostal Church of Saint Michael Archangel
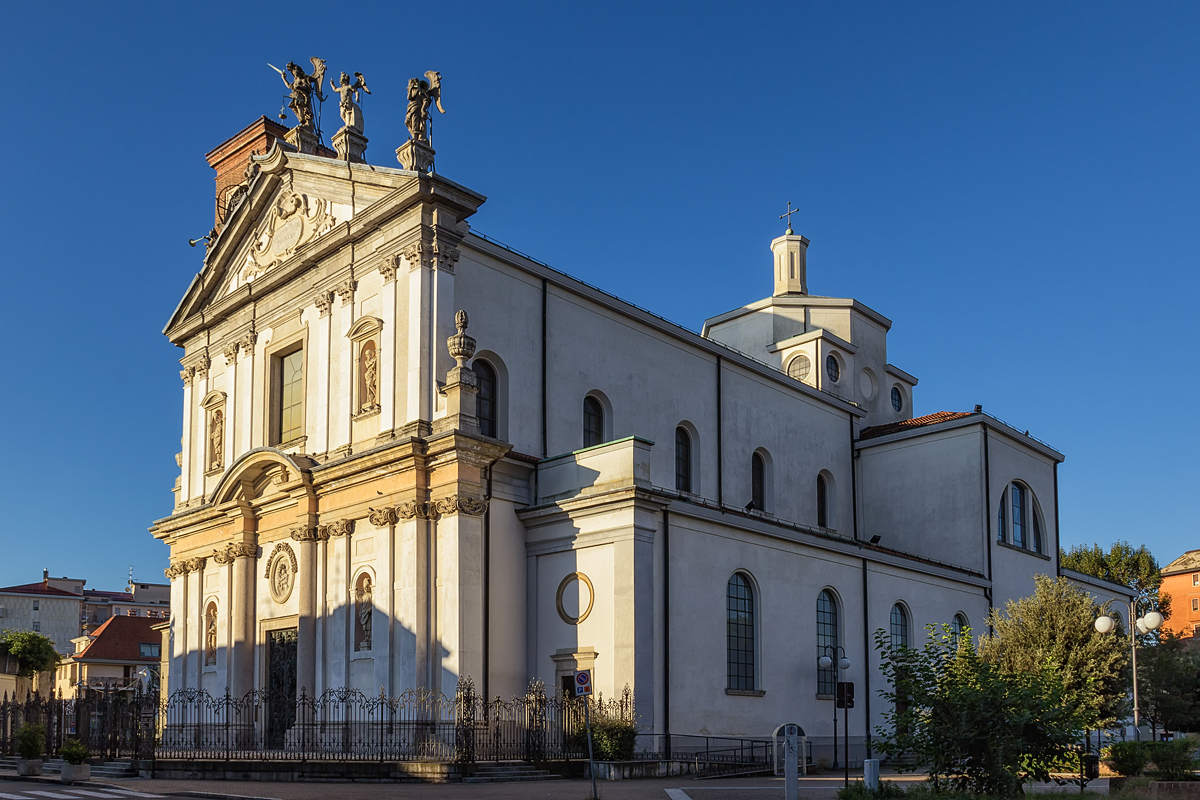
- Church of St. Michael Archangel
- Church of Saint Michael Archangel
- Location: Busto Arsizio, Lombardy
- Country: Italy
- Denomination: Roman Catholic

History
- Founded: 1000 (old church) 1652 (current church)
- Dedication: Saint Michael Archangel
- Consecrated: 1753

Architecture
- Architect: Francesco Maria Richini
- Style: Baroque (church) Romanesque (bell tower)
- Years built: 1652–1796, expanded in 1937

Specifications
- Capacity: 500

Administration
- Diocese: Diocese of Milan
- Parish: San Michele Arcangelo

Clergy
- Priest: Don Giorgio Fantoni Don Fabio Ercoli Don Adriano Colombo

The Church of St. Michael Archangel is one of the most important Catholic churches of Busto Arsizio. The church was constructed above an ancient Lombardic fortification, demolished at the beginning of the 12th century.

== History ==
=== The medieval church ===
A small chapel was present in the Lombardic Fortifications. This was demolished during the 12th century, and replaced with a much larger church, shaped like a basilica, with various altars.

=== The current church ===
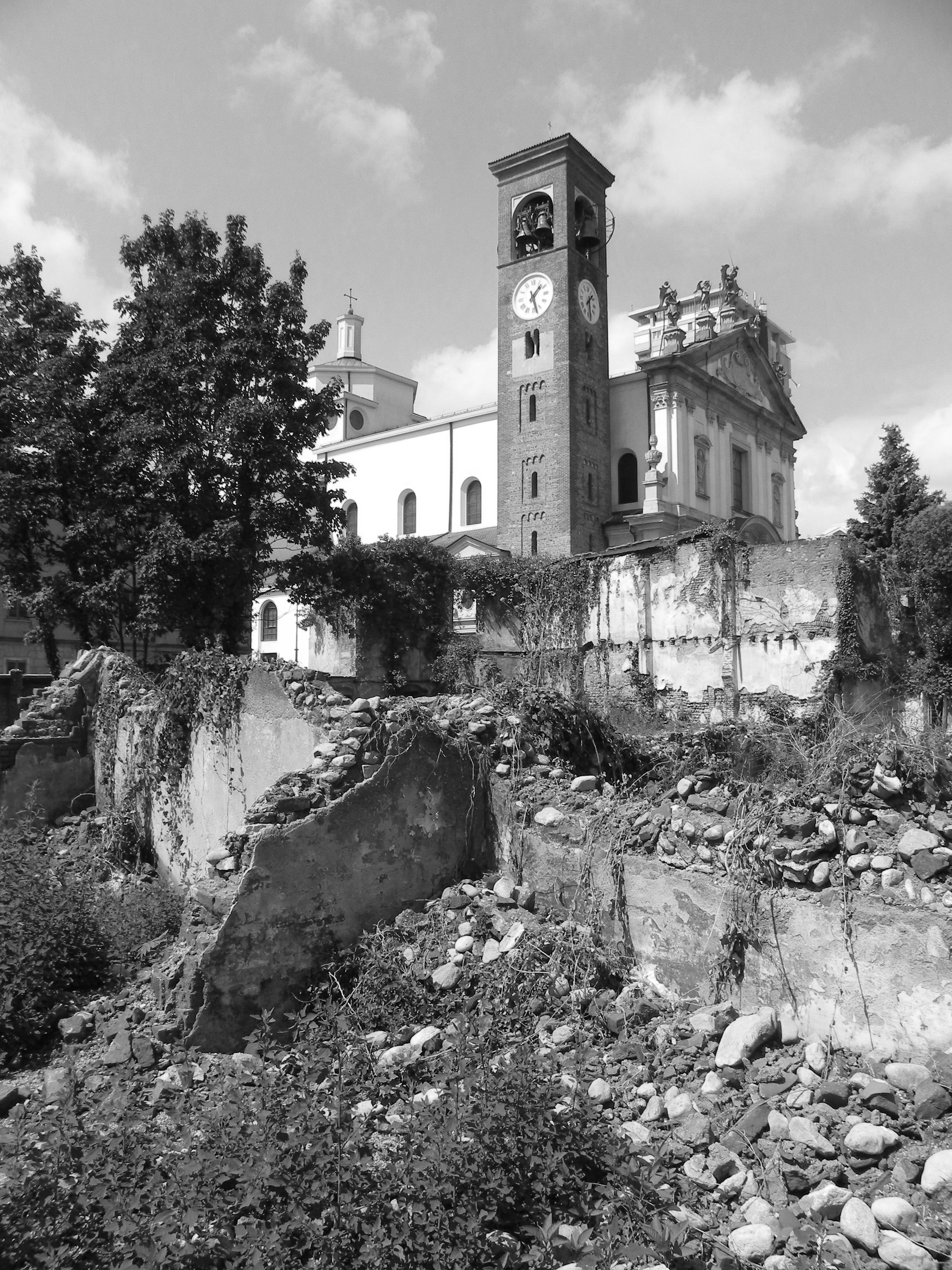
The church photographed from Via Matteotti

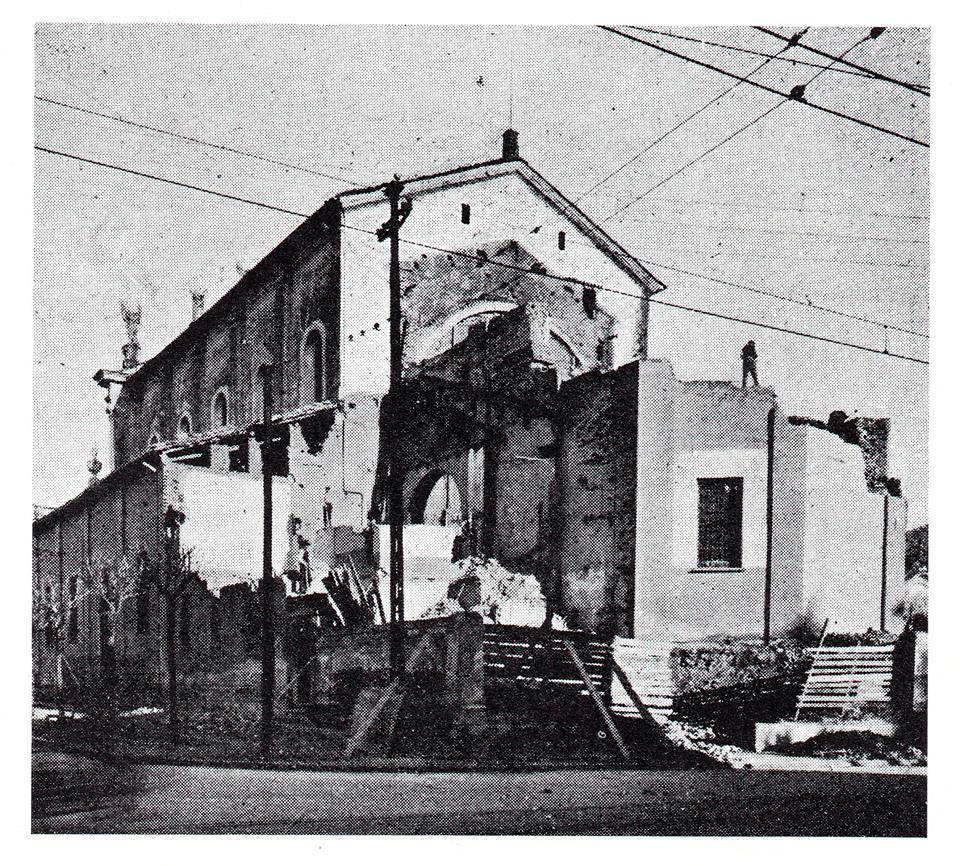
The church during its expansion in 1937

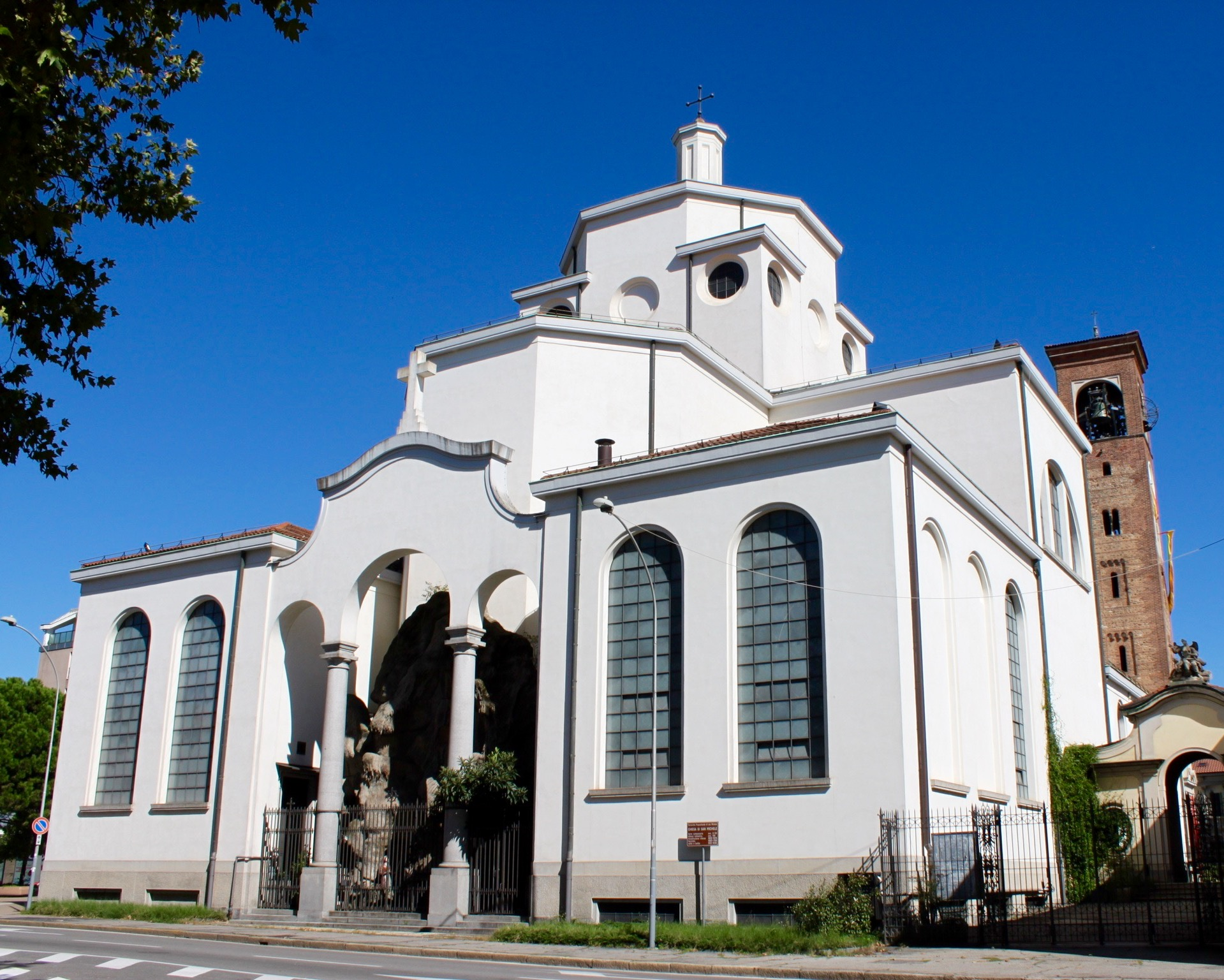
The church after its expansion

Construction of the current church began on 25 March 1653, and finished in 1679 (the façade would be finished nearly 120 years later, in 1796). The church was designed by Francesco Maria Richini. The church's construction was orientated around the bell tower. The bell tower was facing the apse of the old church, so the new church was rotated so that the bell tower faced the left side of the building.

The marble altar was completed in 1753, and was designed by Bustocco Biagio Bellotti. In 1796 the façade was completed. It was then restored in 1924.

The baptistery was constructed in 1884, and in 1937, the church was expanded.

== Architectural design ==
=== Exterior ===
The church has a large Baroque façade. On the left of the building there is the bell tower. The bell tower is one of Busto Arsizio's oldest buildings, with its construction commencing in c. 10th century. Before being a bell tower, it served as a tower for the lombardic Fortification.

The clock of the bell tower was made in 1559. The church initially had 3 bells, but in 1889 another 9 bells were added.

=== Interior ===
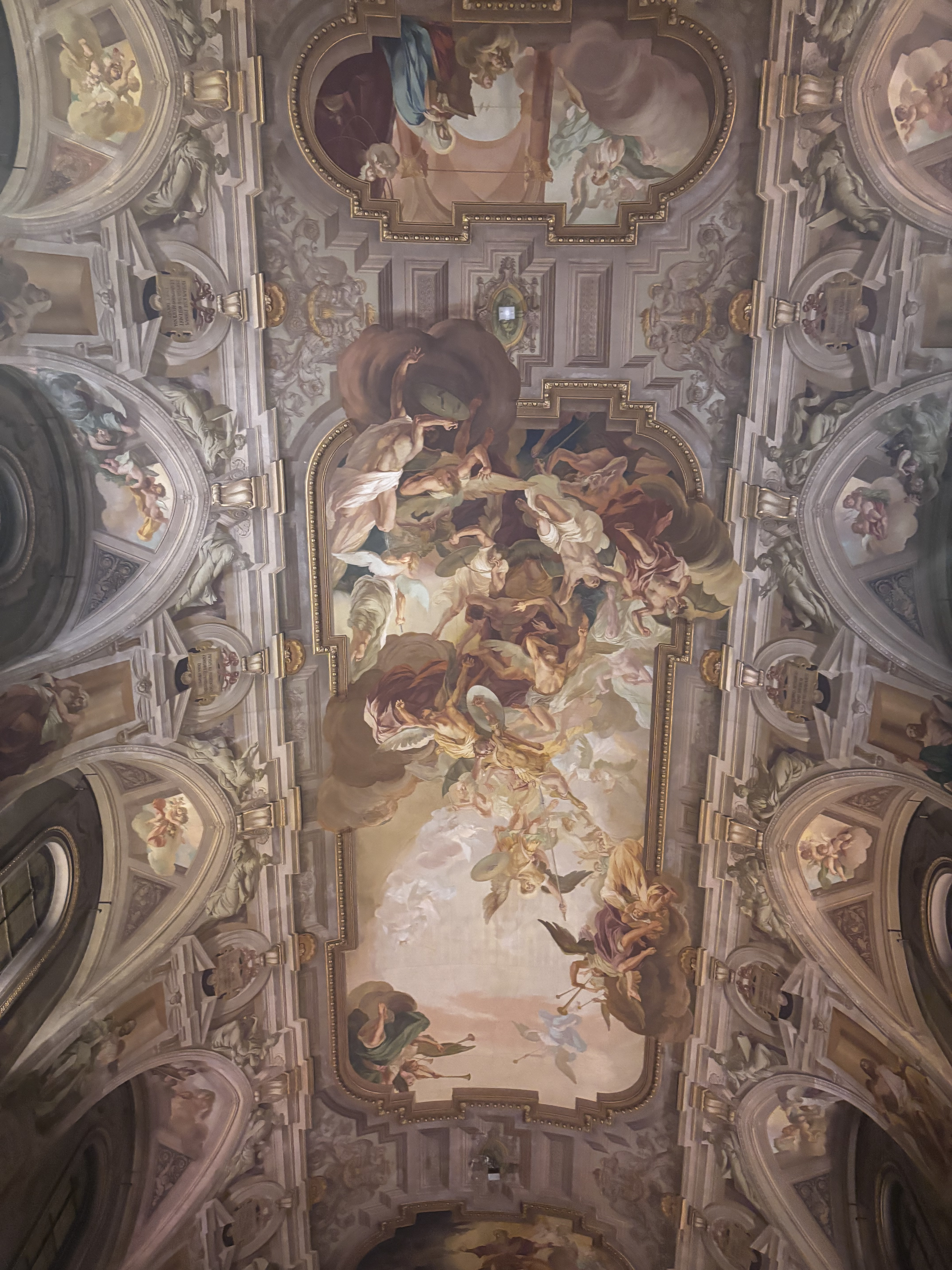
The frescos

The church has the shape of the Latin Cross, with a single nave covered with a barrel vault along which there are ten side chapels, five on each side.

On the right side of the nave are:

- ‘’Chapel of the Crucifix‘’: it is located near the third arch. In it there is a wooden crucifix dating back to the 16th century and a canvas from the end of the 15th century attributable to the school of Ambrogio da Fossano known as il Bergognone (1481–1522) depicting the Virgin with the deposed Christ and angels. Inside the chapel there is also a chiselled silver cross attributed to Biagio Bellotti that holds a relic of the Holy Cross. At the sides of the altar are frescoes of Mary Magdalene and Veronica.
- ‘’Chapel of St. Felix and the relics‘’: located near the fourth arch. It contains the urn of St. Felix and, kept in a niche above the altar, reliquaries dating back to the XVI and XVII centuries. One is in the shape of a cross, two in the shape of busts of saints and others of different workmanship. There is also a painting by Giovan Mauro della Rovere known as il Fiammenghino (1575–1640) depicting St. Charles in adoration of the Holy Nail. On the sides of the altar are frescoes of the early Christian martyrs and the catacombs.
- ‘’Chapel of St. Francis of Paola‘’: built in 1738, it is located near the fifth arch. In it are two paintings, both by an unknown author: one, rectangular in shape, depicts the apparition of St. Michael the Archangel to St. Francis of Paola, the other, oval, shows a miracle by the latter. On the sides of the altar are frescoes of St. Augustine and St. John the Baptist.

On the left side of the nave are:

- ‘’Chapel of St. Joseph‘’: it is located near the third arch. In it there is a wooden group that was ordered in 1903 from the firm Mayer of Munich. On the vault of the chapel, the glory of Saints Cosmas and Damian is depicted. On the sides of the altar, two frescoes show Joseph the Jew and David.
- ‘’Chapel of the Sacred Heart‘’: is located near the fourth archway. Until 1882 it was dedicated to the Holy Innocent Martyrs, whose memory remains in the cartouche on the vault of the chapel. The statue of the Sacred Heart is by the firm Mayer of Munich and was placed in the niche in 1882. On the sides of the altar are St. Thomas Aquinas and St. Margaret Mary Alacoque.
- ‘’Chapel of Madonna‘’: it is located near the fifth archway. In addition to the statue of the Immaculate, the lunette above the altar depicts an angel with the words taken from the Tota pulcra hallelujah verse: ‘’et macula originalis non est in te‘’.
