= Biagio Bellotti =

Italian painter and architect (1714–1789)

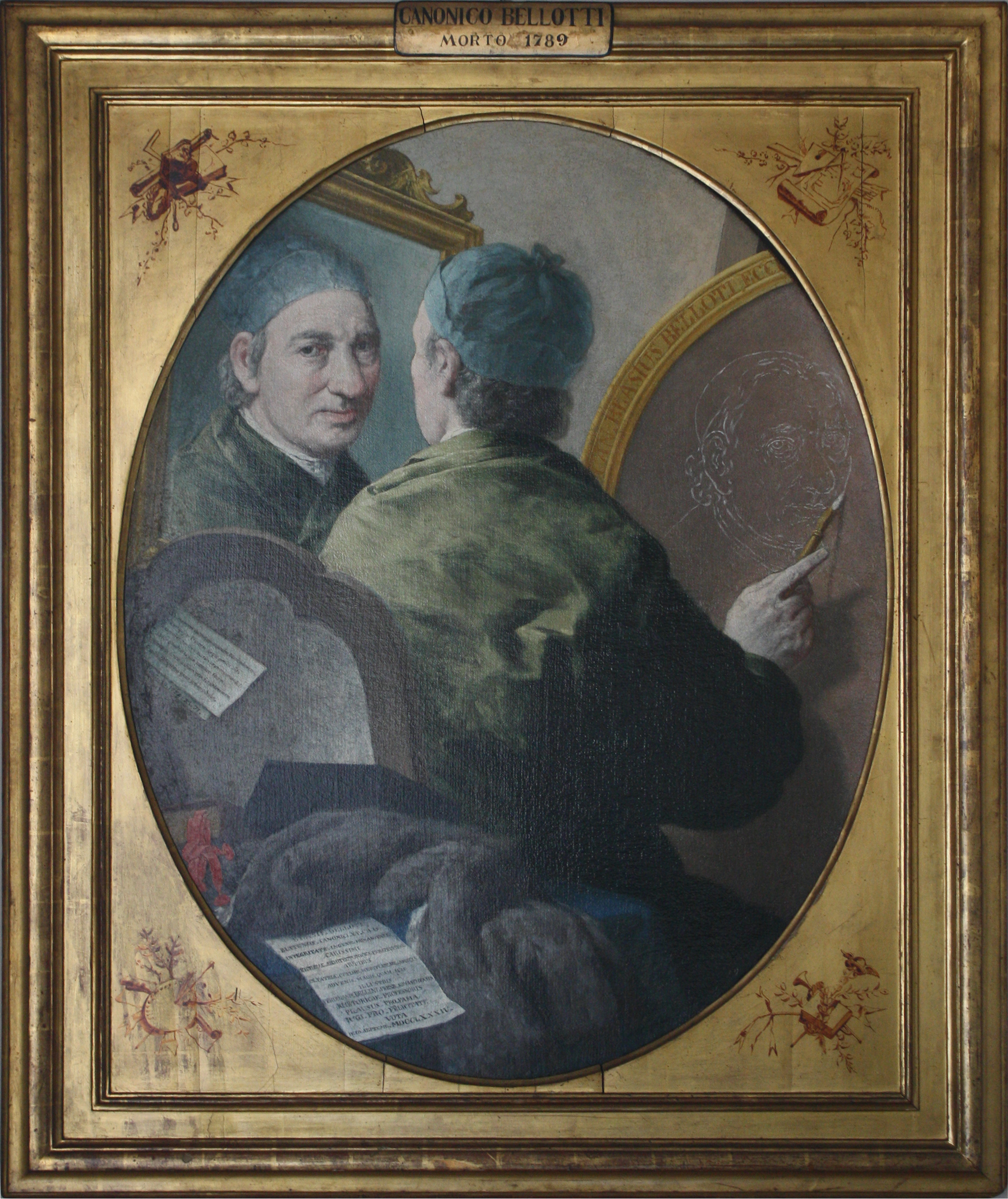
- Born: Biagio Giuseppe Maria Bellotti; 26 February 1714; Busto Arsizio
- Died: 5 August 1789 (aged 75); Busto Arsizio
- Known for: Landscape art, etching

Biagio Giuseppe Maria Bellotti (26 February 1714 in Busto Arsizio – 5 August 1789 in Busto Arsizio) was an Italian painter, architect, sculptor, musician and canon.

== Early life ==
Biagio Giuseppe Maria Bellotti was born on 26 February 1714 in Busto Arsizio, the son of Leopoldo Bellotti (1683–1758) and Aurelia Ballarati, of Gallarate, both from Bourgeoisie families. He was taught by Padre Paolo Gallazzi, and by his grandfather Biagio Bellotti (1656–1713) and by his uncles, Matteo and Paolo Bellotti, both painters, and by Giuseppe Tosi, an organist. Between 1732 and 1742 he studied to become a priest.

== Career ==
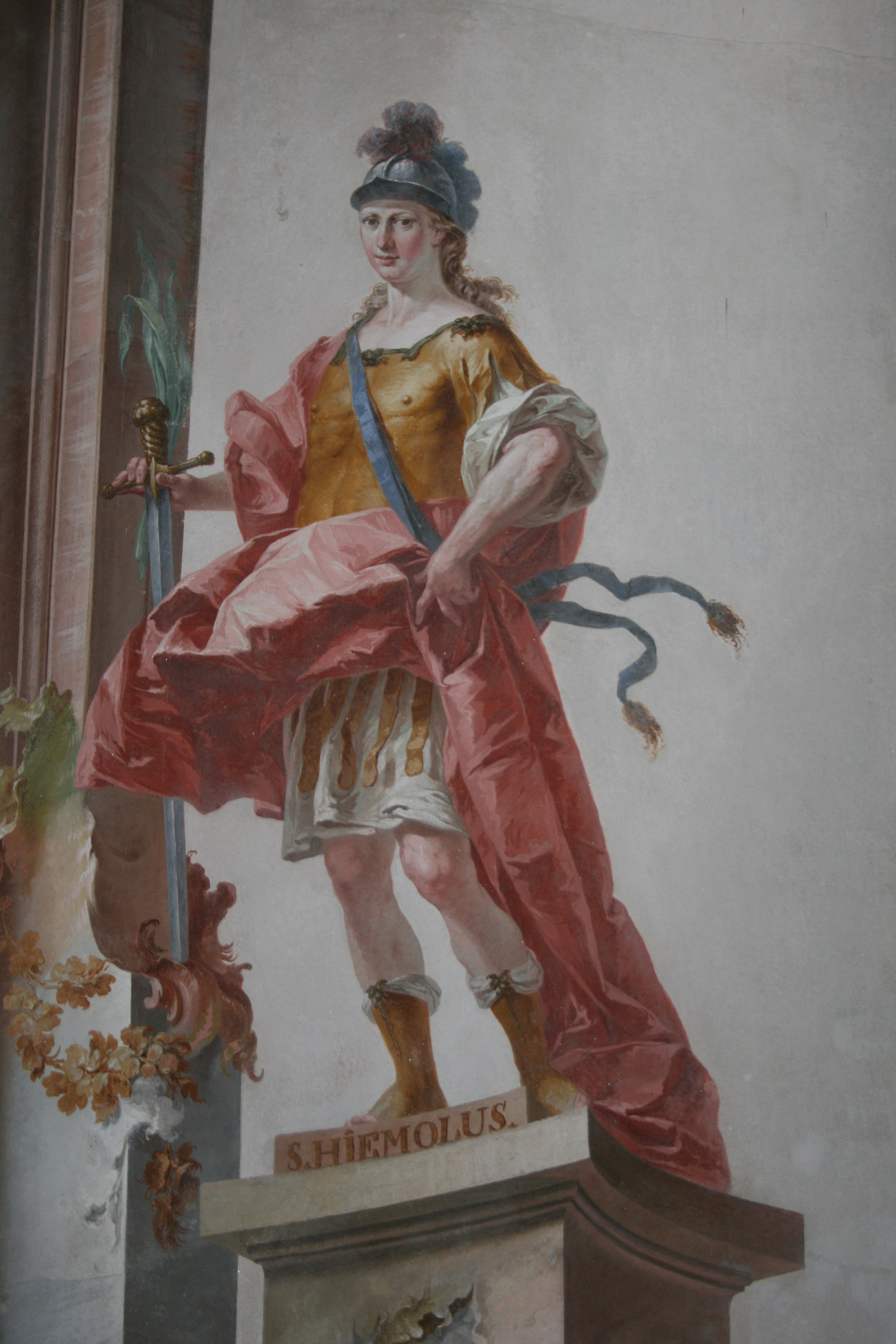
San Jemolo by Biagio Bellotti in the Church of San Gregorio

In 1744, at age 30, he became the Provost of Church of St. John the Baptist. In 1745 he expanded and decorated the Church of San Gregorio in Camposanto, his first artistic project.

In the mid-1750s, he met the engraver Giacomo Marcori from Cremona, with whom he began a ten-year collaboration, focusing mainly on the figure of the blessed Giuliana Puricelli. On September 6, 1756, he was among the judges of the Veneranda Fabbrica del Duomo di Milano (the foundation responsible for the maintenance of Milan Cathedral) to examine the model presented for the statue of St. Giovanni.

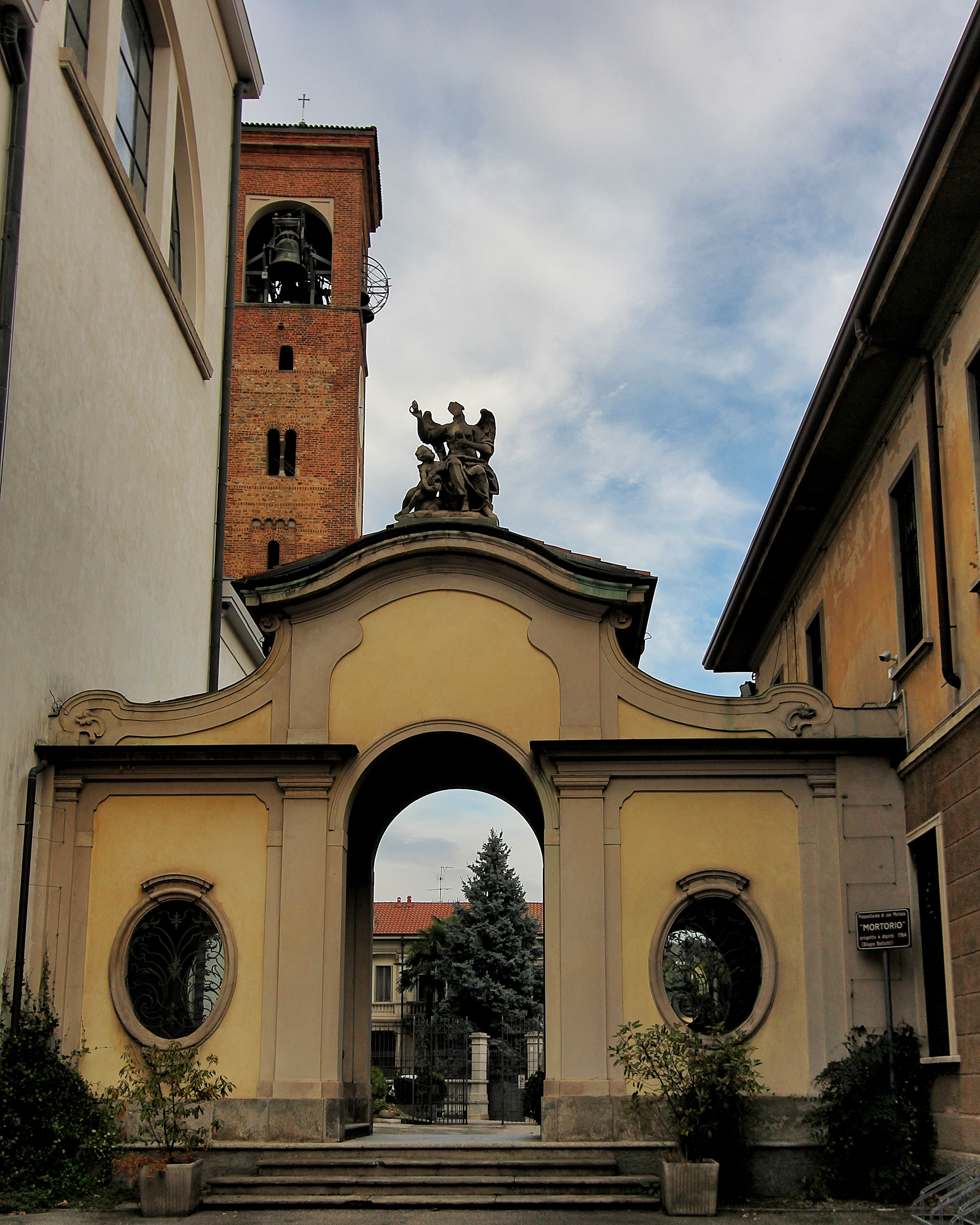
The mortuary of San Michele, designed by Bellotti

On January 15, 1757, he was commissioned to rebuild the new altar and pews for the Basilica of St. John the Baptist. A few years later, in 1761, Bellotti presented a design for the mortuary chapel of the Church of St. Michael the Archangel, which was accepted on May 12 of the same year. Work on the mortuary began in 1764 and, after several interruptions and resumptions, was completed in 1769. During these same years, he was responsible for the decorations of the presbytery of the Basilica of St. John the Baptist and continued to serve as organist.

Around 1770, he created the fifteen mysteries of the Rosary in the Chapel of the Assumption inside the Certosa di Garegnano in Milan. In 1773-1774, he made significant changes to the architectural layout of the church of Madonna in Prato in Busto Arsizio, where he frescoed the vault and repainted the fresco of the Madonna and Child over the existing one.

In 1775, he was commissioned to create the compasses for the Basilica of St. John the Baptist. During this period, he lived only occasionally in his native land and renounced his canonry: his nephew Leopoldo Candiani (son of his sister Francesca) took his place.

In this period he created the choreography for the Entierro (burial) ceremony, a procession through the streets of Busto commemorating the passion and death of Christ. The ceremony originated in Spain and was adopted in Piedmont in the second half of the 18th century. For the occasion, Bellotti created numerous panels to be carried in the procession and gave more than 100 extras instructions on how to dress and what to bring for the town's dramatization, which was probably held in Piazza Santa Maria and Piazza San Giovanni.

At the end of the 1770s, he returned to live in Busto Arsizio, where he painted his Self-Portrait on canvas, later donated by his nephew to the hospital in Busto Arsizio, of which he was an important benefactor, to start the Quadreria dei Benefattori (where it is still preserved).

At the age of 71, he painted the frescoes in the Chapel of the Holy Rosary in the Church of Saints Stephen and Lawrence in Olgiate Olona. Among the works on display in the Museo delle Civiche Raccolte d'Arte (Museum of Civic Art Collections) in Palazzo Marliani-Cicogna in Busto Arsizio are two detached frescoes: the Deposition and the Virgin with the Sleeping Child, and the Project for the base of an altarpiece, an ink drawing.

Bellotti’s will

He died in Busto Arsizio on 5 August 1789, aged 75.

== Legacy ==
The middle school in the neighbourhood of Sant'Edoardo, Busto Arsizio, was named after him.

A road in Sacconago, frazione of Busto Arsizio was dedicated to the painter.

== Family ==
Biagio Bellotti came from a family of painters, which included his father, two uncles, his grandfather, and two grand-uncles.

Ancestors of Biagio Bellotti

Ambrogio Bellotti
8. Matteo Bellotti (1605–1689)
4. Biagio Bellotti (1656–1713)
Giovanni Battista Crespi Guzzo (1573–1635)
9. Paola Crespi Guzzo (1610–?)
Caterina Armiraglio Laffranchi (1579–?)
2. Leopoldo Bellotti (1683–1758)
5. Anna Maria Tosi (1656–1713)
1. Biagio Bellotti (1714–1789)
3. Aurelia Ballarati
