= Franco Agnesi =

Italian catholic bishop

Franco Maria Giuseppe Agnesi (Milan, 4 December 1950) is an Italian Catholic bishop, Auxiliary Bishop of Milan since 24 May 2014.

== Biography ==
He was born in Milan on 4 December 1950. He grew up in Legnano, in the parish of San Domenico.

=== Priestly formation and ministry ===
He completed his studies in the Archbishop's Seminary of Milan.

On 8 June 1974 he was ordained a priest in the cathedral of Milan by Cardinal Giovanni Colombo.

After ordination he was appointed vice-rector of the theological seminary of Saronno, a position he held until 1980, when he became diocesan assistant of the youth sector of Azione Cattolica. Since 1989 he has been the general diocesan assistant of the same lay association and head of the diocesan youth pastoral office.

In 1995 he was appointed by Cardinal Carlo Maria Martini as pro-vicar general of the archdiocese and moderator curiæ of the archbishopric Curia of Milan.

On 15 July of the same year he received the honorary title of prelate of honor of His Holiness from Pope John Paul II. From 1994 to 1995 he was also director of the Milanese Oratori Foundation (FOM), of which he became president in 1995, a position he held until 2002.

From 1995 to 2003 he also covered the significant role of president of Caritas Ambrosiana. In 2003 he became parish priest of San Giovanni Battista in Cesano Boscone and in 2005 he assumed the position of dean of the deanery of Cesano Boscone.

In 2008 he was appointed provost of San Giovanni Battista in Busto Arsizio and in 2009 he became dean of the deanery of Busto Arsizio.

On 5 April 2012, during the Chrism Mass, Cardinal Angelo Scola announced his appointment as episcopal vicar for the pastoral area II of Varese, the largest in the entire diocese: the appointment became effective on the following 29 June.

=== Episcopal ministry ===
On 24 May 2014 Pope Francis appointed him auxiliary bishop of Milan and titular bishop of Dusa. The following 28 June, he received episcopal ordination in the cathedral of Milan with the bishops Pierantonio Tremolada and Paolo Martinelli, from cardinal Angelo Scola, co-consecrating cardinal Dionigi Tettamanzi and bishop Mario Delpini (later archbishop).

In the afternoon of the same day he presided over his first mass as bishop in the sanctuary of the Sacro Monte di Varese. He is also the first original bishop of the city of Legnano.

He holds the position of delegate of the Lombard Episcopal Conference for the pastoral care of migrants and is a member of the Episcopal Commission for migration within the Italian Episcopal Conference.

On 29 March 2018, during the Chrism Mass, Archbishop Mario Delpini announced his appointment as vicar general of the archdiocese, effective from the following 29 June; he succeeds the same mons. Delpini.
