= Sacconago =

Frazione of Busto Arsizio, Italy

Coordinates: 45°35′55″N 8°50′28″E

Sacconago Sinågu
- Frazione
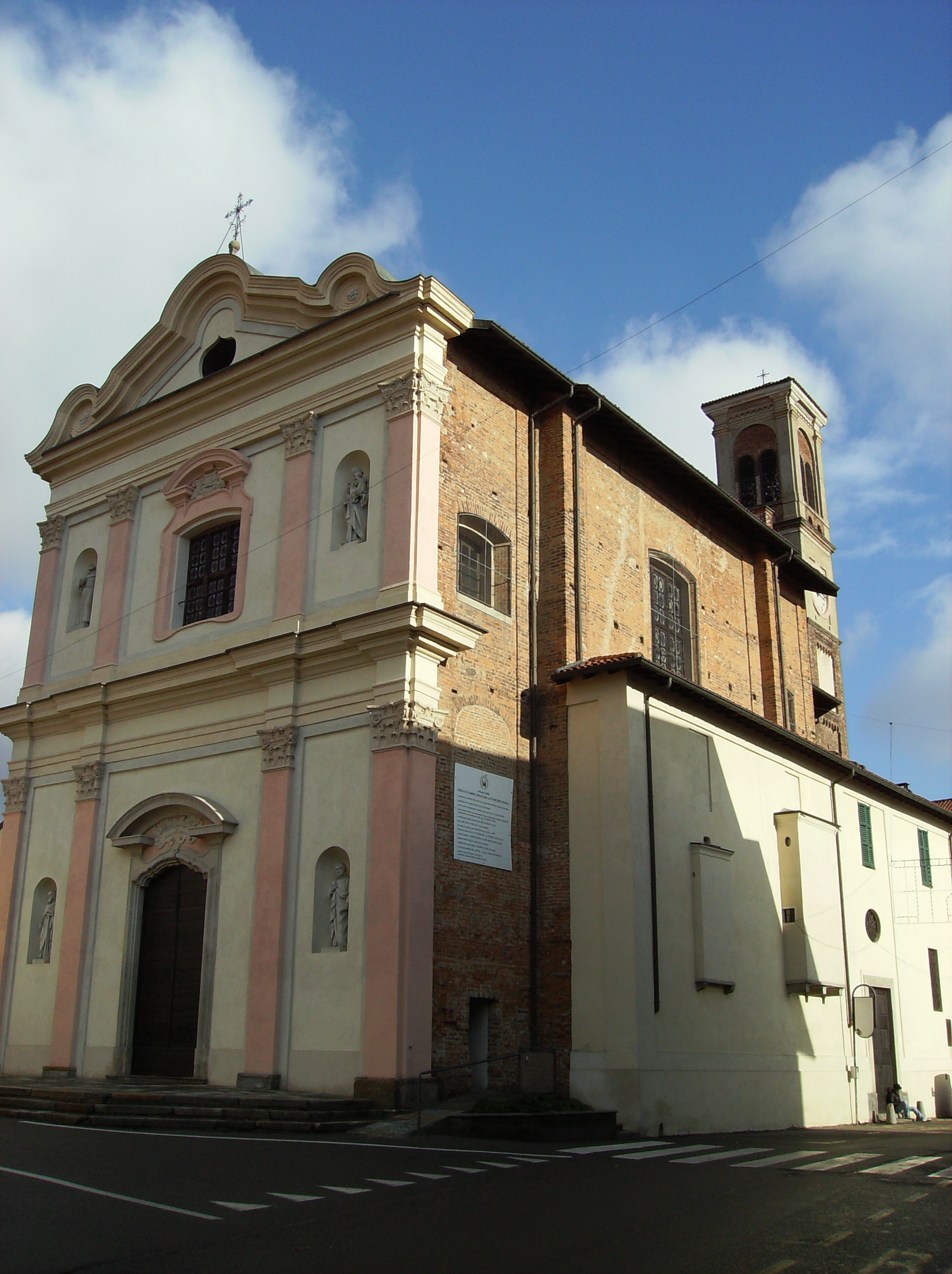
- Old church of Sacconago.
- Interactive map of Sacconago

Population (2011)
  - Total: 8,637
- Demonym(s): Sinaghino (masculine), Sinaghina (femminine), Sinaghini (plural)

Sacconago (Sinågu in Bustocco) is a frazione of 8,639 inhabitants of the comune of Busto Arsizio. It was an autonomous municipality from the Middle Ages until 1928, and a parish since the Renaissance.

== History ==
The village of Sacconago likely dates back to the period between the 2nd century BC and the 2nd century AD. It is believed that the suffix "-ago" originated in the Celto-Roman era, from a Celtic population that was Romanized.

The first archaeological remains were found in the old church of Sacconago, where construction work uncovered not only the remains of the church preceding the current one, including the entire left side and the apse with magnificent frescoes, now excellently restored, but also those of an older building, whose foundations are now visible through a glass floor.

In the Middle Ages, it was part of the pieve of Olgiate Olona, which was transferred in 1583 by Saint Charles Borromeo to Busto Arsizio. In 1649, the nobleman Giuseppe Corio purchased the fief of the village from Philip IV of Spain. In 1730, Sacconago incorporated the then-autonomous municipality of Cascina Brughetto.

Sacconago was united with Busto Arsizio for the first time from 8 November 1811 to 12 February 1816, and thereafter remained an autonomous municipality for over a century. In 1853, it had 1,658 inhabitants. In 1869, the municipality of Borsano was annexed to it, remaining united until 1912. The previous year, the San Cirillo kindergarten was founded. In 1928, it was definitively annexed to Busto Arsizio, along with Borsano.

The then-parish priest Don Angelo Volontè was active during the Resistance. Behind the cemetery, in February 1945, executions of partisans took place.

== Monuments and places of interest ==
=== Parish Church of Saints Peter and Paul ===
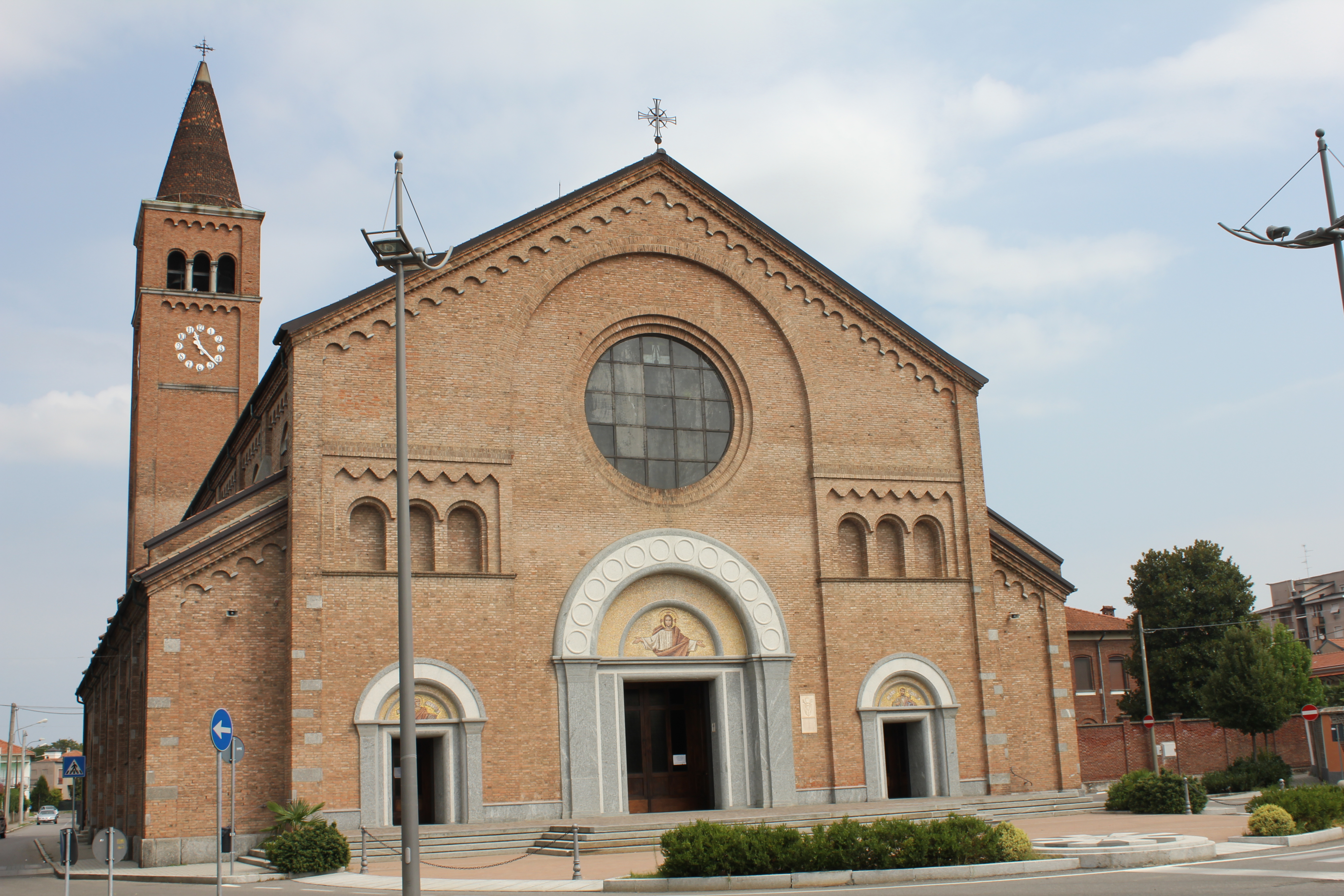
Parish Church of Sacconago

The idea of further enlarging the 18th-century church to make it more spacious was abandoned, and the foundation stone for the new church, also dedicated to the holy Apostles Peter and Paul, was laid in 1928 in the area of the old cemetery, the year in which the former autonomous municipality of Sacconago was annexed, along with Borsano, to the city of Busto Arsizio.

The first Holy Mass was celebrated in 1932 by Don Antonio Marelli, who, as early as 1904, had brought the issue of the limited capacity of the 18th-century church to the attention of the Archbishop of Milan, Cardinal Ferrari.

The church was consecrated by Cardinal Ildefonso Schuster on 24 September 1933, and the relics and bells from the old church were brought there in solemn processions. The building’s design, with exposed brick walls and irregularly arranged stone blocks, is by Engineer Azzimonti.

The interior features three naves and a semicircular apse. It houses a 17th-century oil painting depicting the martyrdom of Saint Ursula. The main altar, made of white marble, dates back to 1937.

=== Old Church of Saints Peter and Paul ===
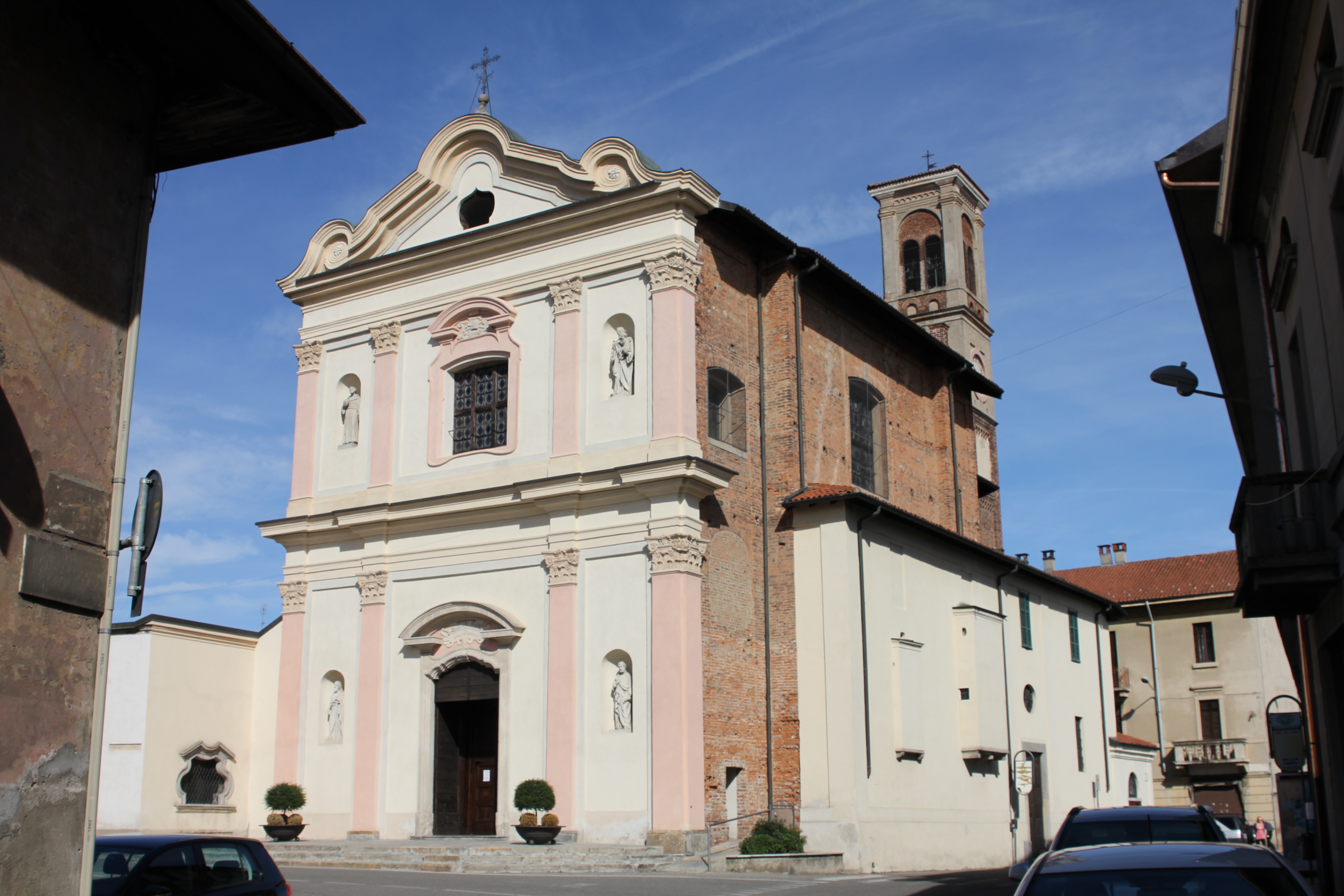
The old church of Sacconago

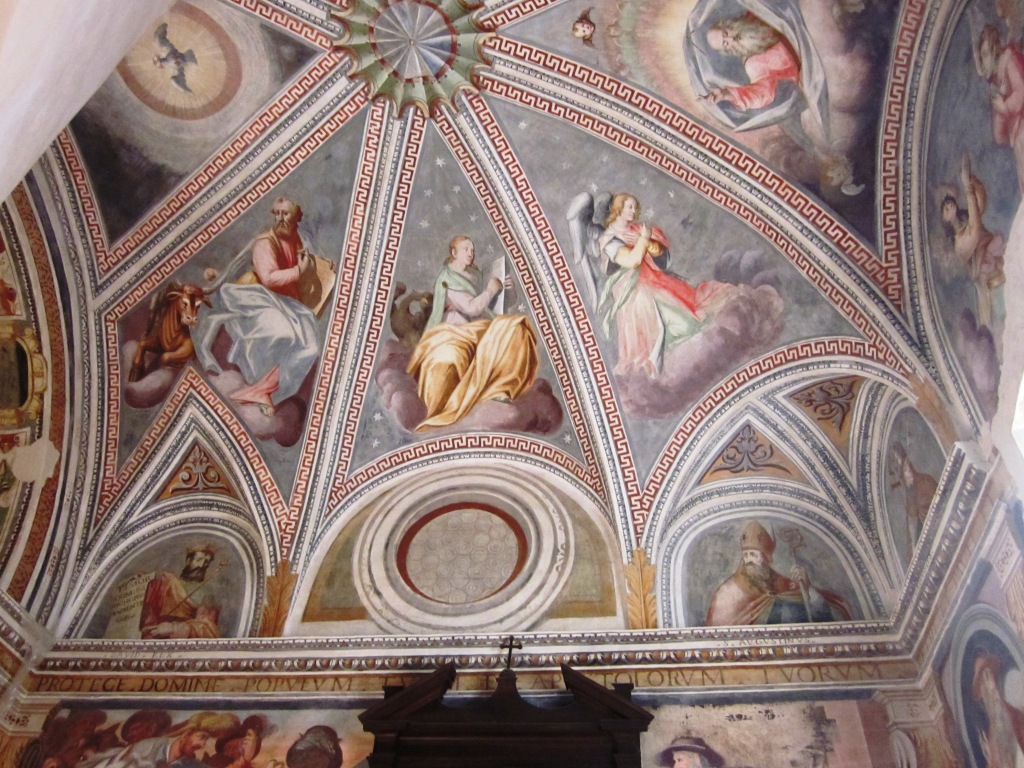
Apse vault

One of the notable monuments of the district is the old parish church (a Gésa Vègia), dedicated to the holy apostles Peter and Paul, commonly called the "old church." The current building was constructed between 1708 and 1724 in the area where the ancient medieval church with a single hall and the adjacent cemetery once stood.

Some remains of the ancient church, smaller and built around the 10th century, remain, such as the northern perimeter wall. The medieval building was expanded in the 15th century, with the construction of a new square presbytery (now the sacristy) and a new sacristy (now a storage room). The consecration took place on 26 November 1549.

In 1580, two chapels were added: one for the baptistery and one dedicated to the Virgin Mary. In 1611, the bell tower, which still survives in its lower pre-Renaissance-style part, was built. In the late 18th century, the bell chamber was closed to transform it into the clock segment, and a new bell chamber was built above it.

The current building consists of a central nave opening onto four side chapels. The organ dates back to 1923 and replaced the old one, which was donated five years later to the parish of Grantola. Recently, the building underwent extensive and thorough restorations, revealing the antiquity of the place of worship and uncovering valuable frescoes.

=== Church of Saint Donato (demolished) ===
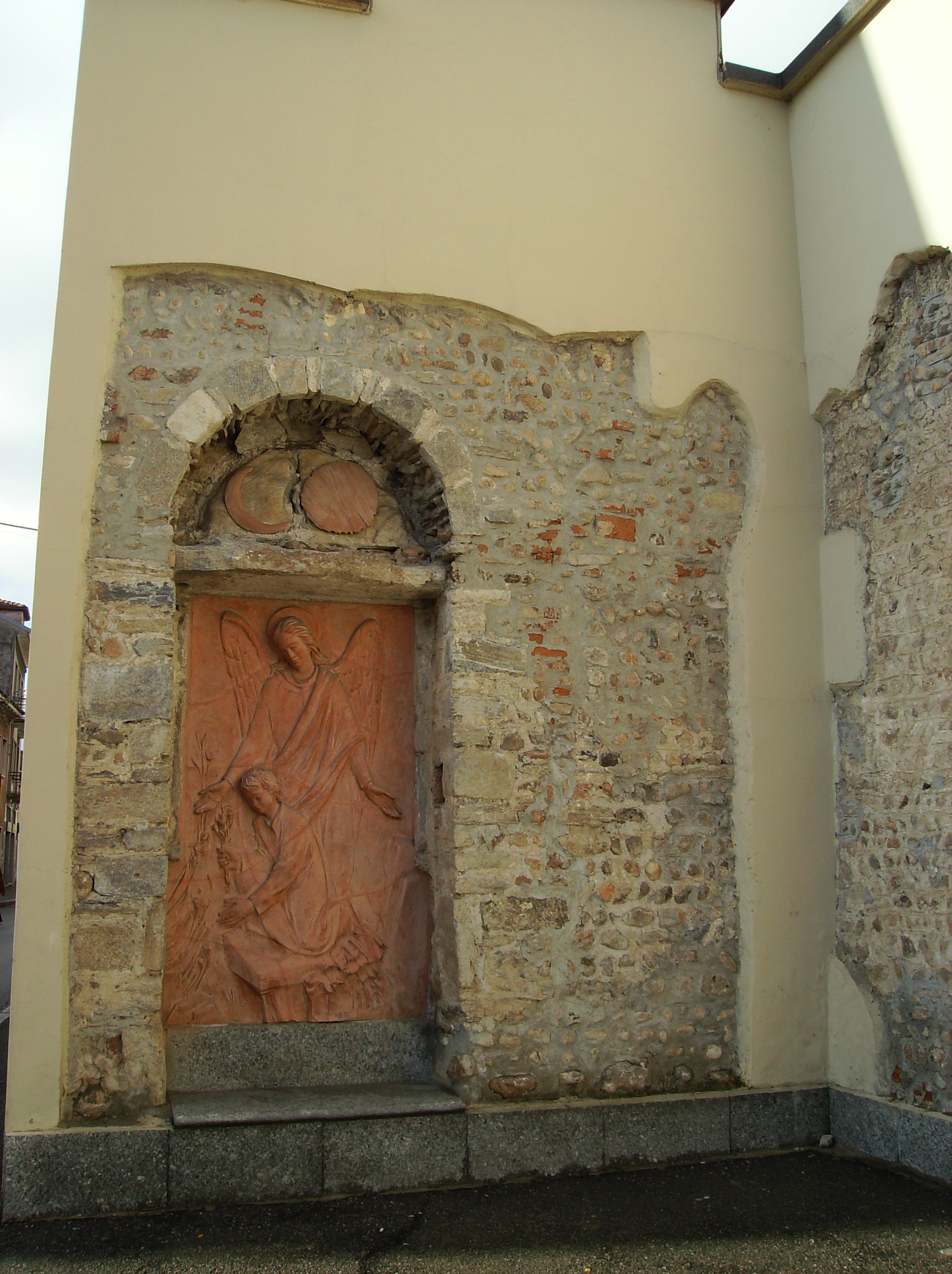
The remains of the Church of San Donato

Outside the small inhabited center stood the oratory of Saint Donato, a small church already mentioned in the repertoire of Milanese churches at the end of the 13th century but likely dating back to the village’s origins. Over the centuries, the inhabited area of Sacconago grew until it encompassed the church. It was demolished in 1954 to build a cinema.

=== Church of Madonna in Campagna ===
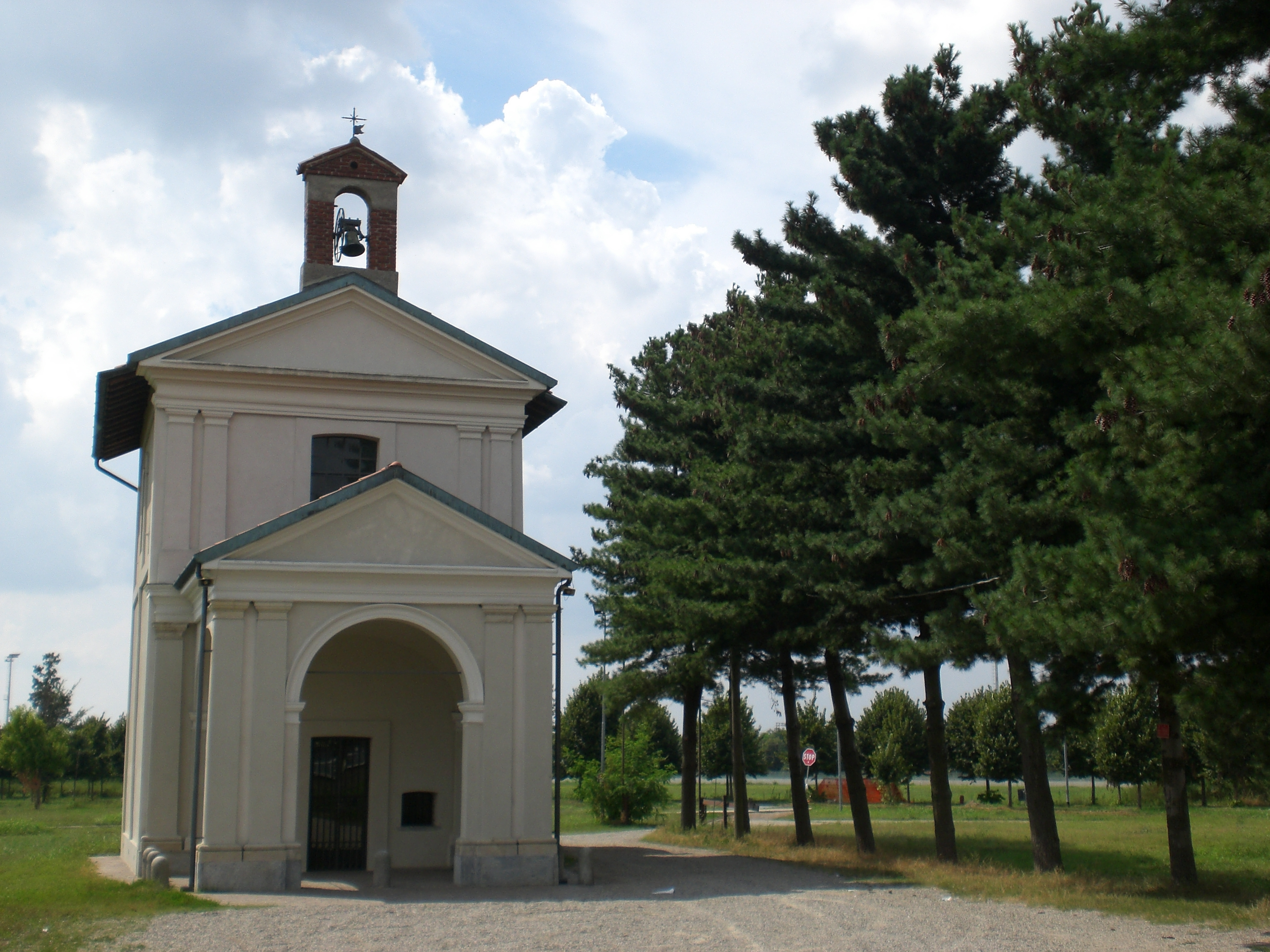
Church of Madonna in Campagna

In the place where the church now stands, a small votive chapel existed at least since 1561. In 1702, it was decided to build a proper church dedicated to the Blessed Virgin of the Seven Sorrows in the place where, on a simple piece of masonry, an image of the Deposition was venerated. The building was originally not consecrated but only blessed. It also lacked the portico in front of the facade that can be seen today.

The church’s interior was decorated with a valuable painting of the Pietà, depicting the Virgin holding the body of the dead Jesus Christ. The church was equipped with a sacristy in the second half of the 18th century. Due to recent road improvements that connected the industrial area, the waste collection center, and the new athletics stadium (and will allow access to the new Sacconago intermodal freight terminal) to the city, part of the ancient country lane that ran alongside the church has been lost.

=== Cemetery ===
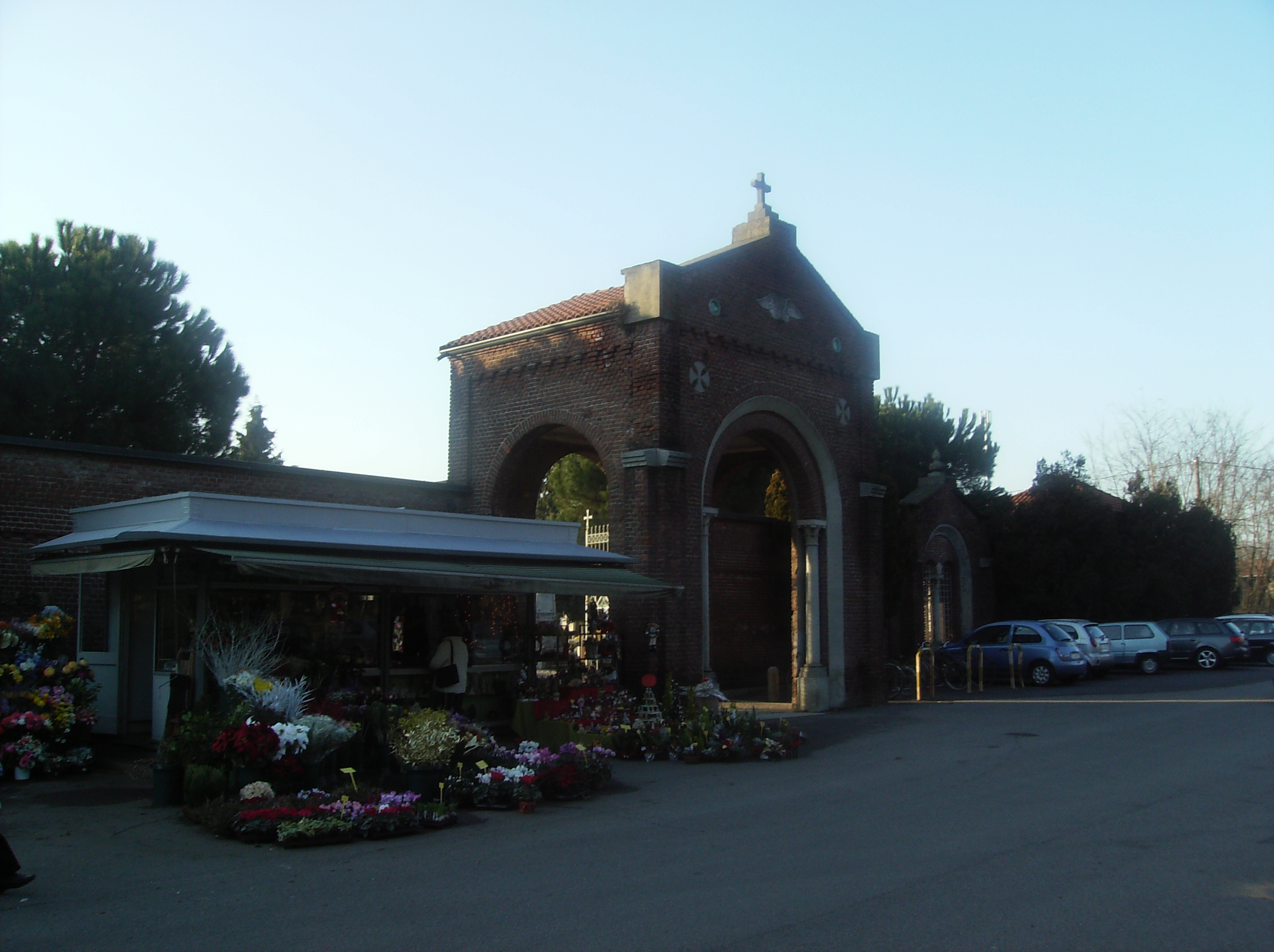
Cemetery of Sacconago

In the mid-18th century, when the old cemetery next to the old parish church of Saints Peter and Paul became inadequate, a new cemetery was built outside the historic core of the former Sacconago municipality, in the area where, since 1928, the new parish church stands.

At the end of the 19th century, it was decided to move the cemetery again to an area southwest of the urban center, on Via Bienate, which connects Sacconago with the former autonomous municipality of Bienate. The new cemetery was designed by Engineer Ercole Seves in 1898, who had previously designed the Monumental Cemetery of Busto Arsizio. The first burial took place in 1908.

Among the notable monuments is the Gagliardi chapel, designed by architect Silvio Gambini.

=== Calcaterra Villa ===
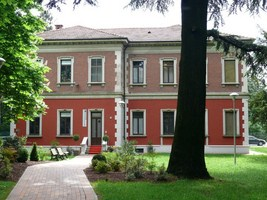
Calcaterra Villa

The villa was built in the 1920s by the Calcaterra family, who also owned a spinning mill in Sacconago and a weaving mill in Valcuvia. During World War II, it was requisitioned by the Germans and became notorious for the torture inflicted on local partisans inside.

It remained in the family’s ownership until 1968 and was purchased in 1972 by the Municipality of Busto Arsizio, which designated it as a branch location for the "Ada Negri" elementary schools and later the "Arturo Tosi" scientific high school. The villa, whose main facade is on Via Magenta, has an H-shaped plan developed over three floors. The villa’s exterior features numerous decorations.

In the large park surrounding the villa, between Via Magenta and Via XI Febbraio, stands the monument to the Sacconago municipality.

After being long abandoned and subject to vandalism, on 31 October 2009, following appropriate restoration, it was handed over to the Istituto cinematografico Michelangelo Antonioni.

== Human geography ==
Its territory includes, in addition to the ancient village of Sacconago proper, the former municipality of Cascina Brughetto (or Cascina di Borghetto). The two municipalities were united in 1730.

It was a marquisate from 1647 under the Corio family, which had to request a dispensation due to the small number of "hearths" (family units) that made up the community.

== Culture ==
=== Traditions and folklore ===
Regarding religious traditions, the district celebrates the feast of Saint Cyril: after the Holy Mass, the sinaghini celebrate through the district’s streets with knights and mule-drawn carts.

== Infrastructure and transport ==
The Sacconago freight terminal, already planned in the 1975 urban plan, and built between 2007 and 2010 on an area of 38,000 square meters, was designed to remove approximately 40,000 trucks per year from the roads (just under a sixth of those removed by the Hupac Terminal in Busto Arsizio). After two years of disuse, and following the completion of the new Via Piombina road infrastructure, the newly established logistics company Carcolog leased the area from the Swiss company Hupac (which had managed it from Trenord) to use it during the renovation of the Arese terminal to distribute FIAT cars to dealerships in Lombardy, Piedmont, and Veneto.

== Gallery ==
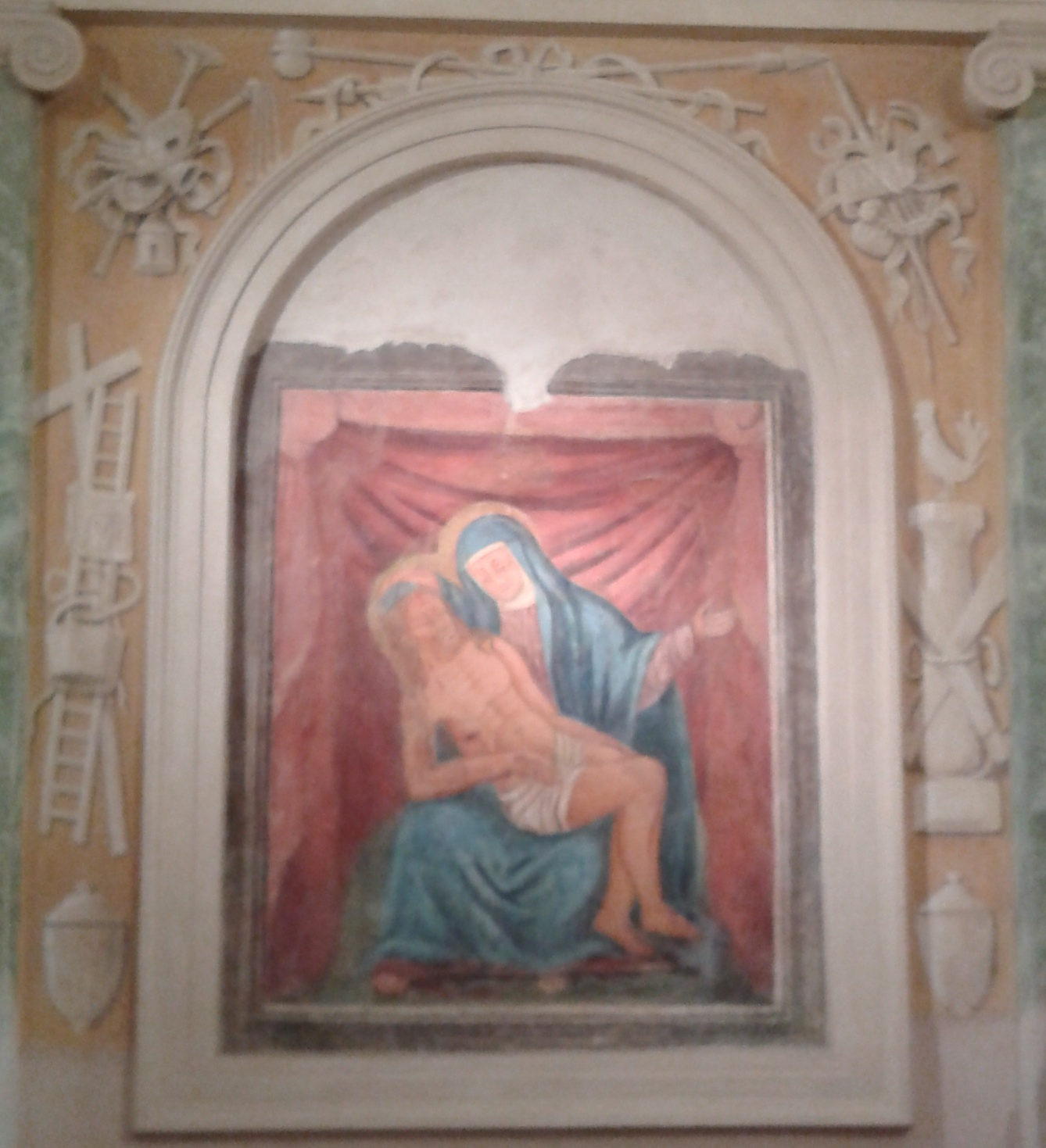
Pietà, Church of Madonna in Campagna

== Bibliography ==
- Spada, Augusto (2004). Conoscere la città di/Getting to know the city of Busto Arsizio [Getting to Know the City of Busto Arsizio] (in Italian). Busto Arsizio: Freeman Publications.
