= San Nazaro in Brolo =

Basilica in Milan, Lombardy, Italy

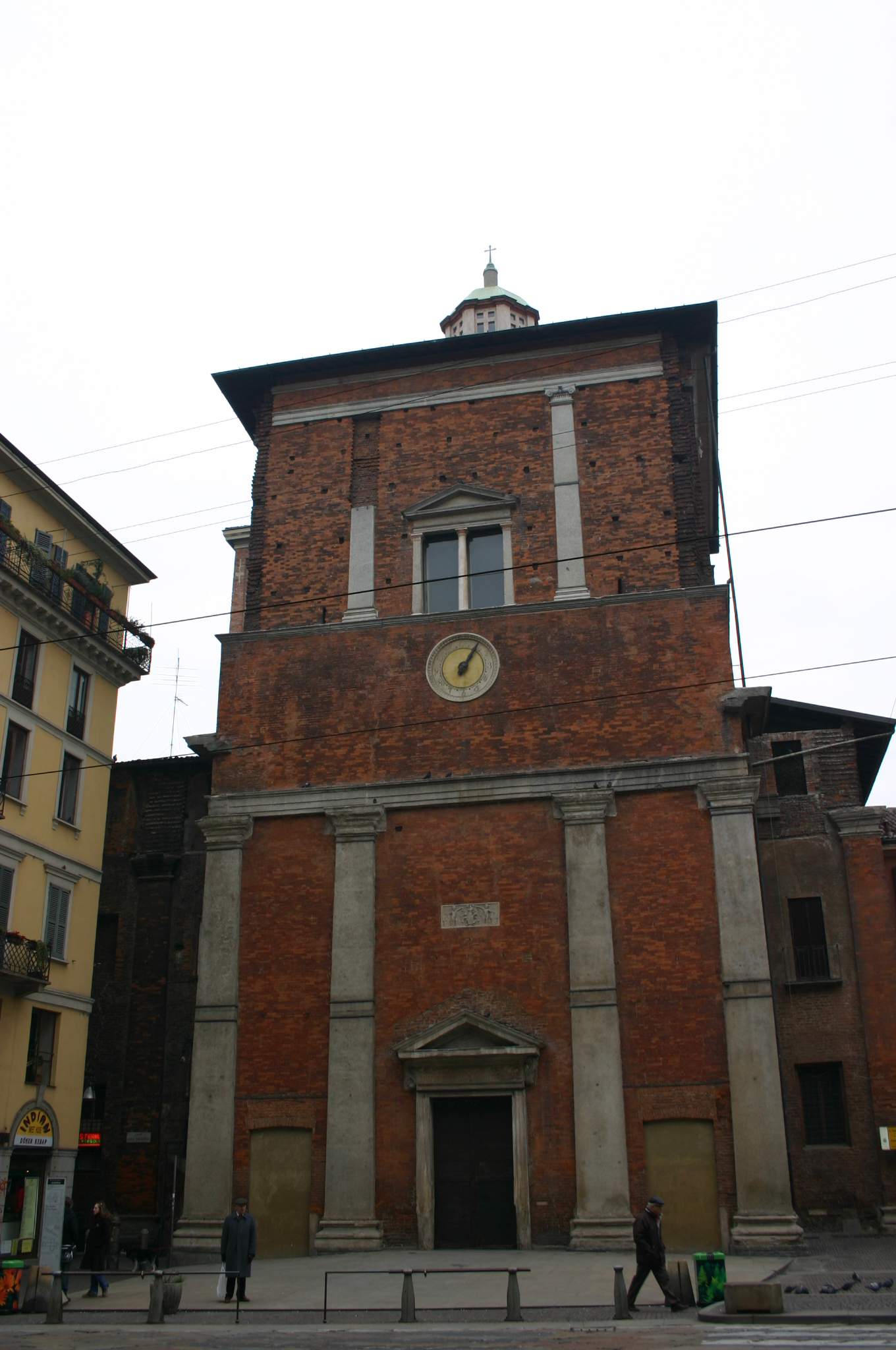
- Façade with the Trivulzio Mausoleum.

Religion
- Affiliation: Roman Catholic
- Ecclesiastical or organisational status: Basilica
- Status: Active

Location
- Location: Milan
- Interactive map of San Nazaro in Brolo
- Coordinates: 45°27′31″N 9°11′33″E

Architecture
- Type: Basilica
- Style: Romanesque
- Groundbreaking: 382

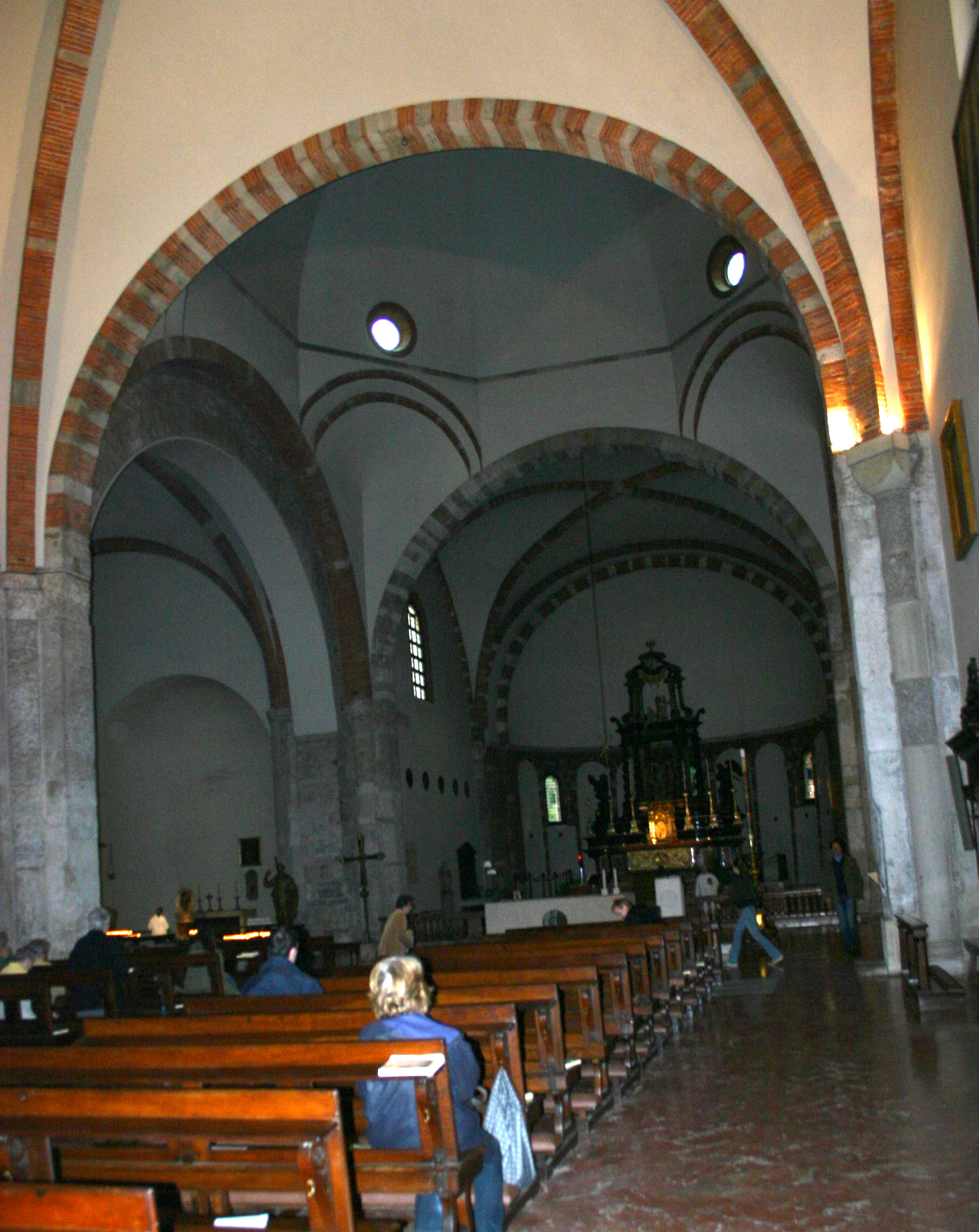
View of the interior of the church

The basilica of San Nazaro in Brolo or San Nazaro Maggiore is a 4th-century Roman Catholic church located in Piazza San Nazzaro in Brolo in Milan, region of Lombardy, Italy.

== History and description ==
Putatively the church was commissioned in 382 by St Ambrose, to be built along the road that connected Milan (then Mediolanum) to Rome. Originally dedicated to the Apostles, and the church was known as the Basilica Apostolorum. As explained by an inscription in the church written by Ambrose himself, the church's plan was on the Greek Cross with apses on the arms, a feature present only in the Church of the Holy Apostles in Constantinople. In front of the basilica was a porticoed atrium. Under the basilica's altar were housed relics of the Apostles, which are still present. In 397, when the body of St. Nazarus was discovered, a new apse was created. Serena, niece of emperor Theodosius I, donated the marbles for the sacellum housing the relics and also embellished the rest of the church.

The apse of the right arm has a portal with a false porch. The ceiling of the nave, originally consisting of wooden spans, was replaced by a groin vault during the Middle Ages. The walls are original. Also in this age the Romanesque-style octagonal tambour, featuring a circular loggia with small columns, was added over the arms' crossing.

Starting in 1512, Bramantino built the Trivulzio Mausoleum, an octagonal chapel. Commissioned by the Condottiero Giangiacomo Trivulzio, he awkwardly constructed this chapel to be placed before the facade, instead of as a side chapel.

From the left transept, one enters the Chapel of St. Catherine of Alexandria, designed and built circa 1540 by Antonio da Lonate. In this chapel is a large frescoed arch depicting the Martyrdom of St. Catherine (1548–1549) by Bernardino Lanino and Giovan Battista della Cerva.

== Gallery ==
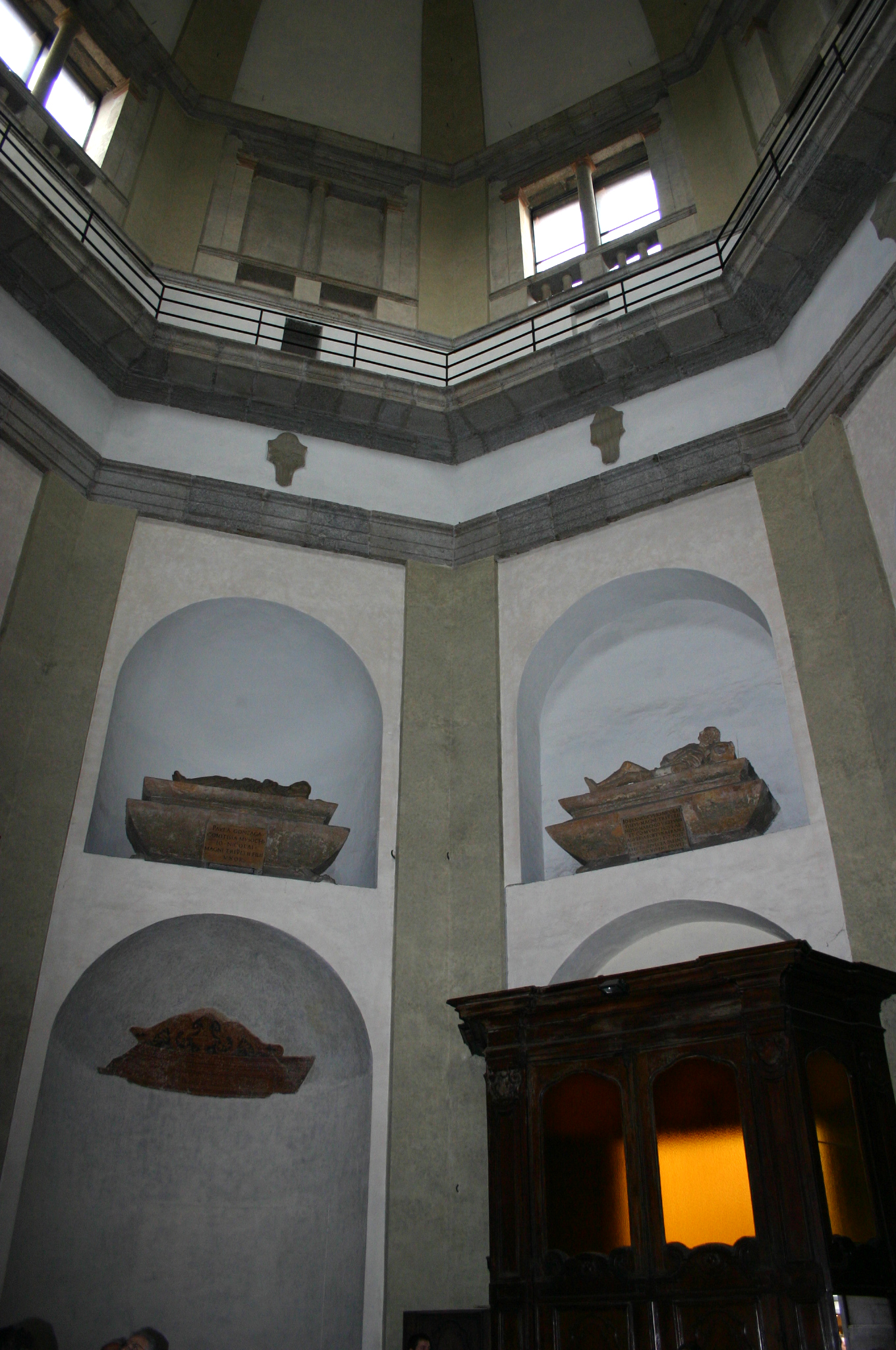
Trivulzio Chapel.

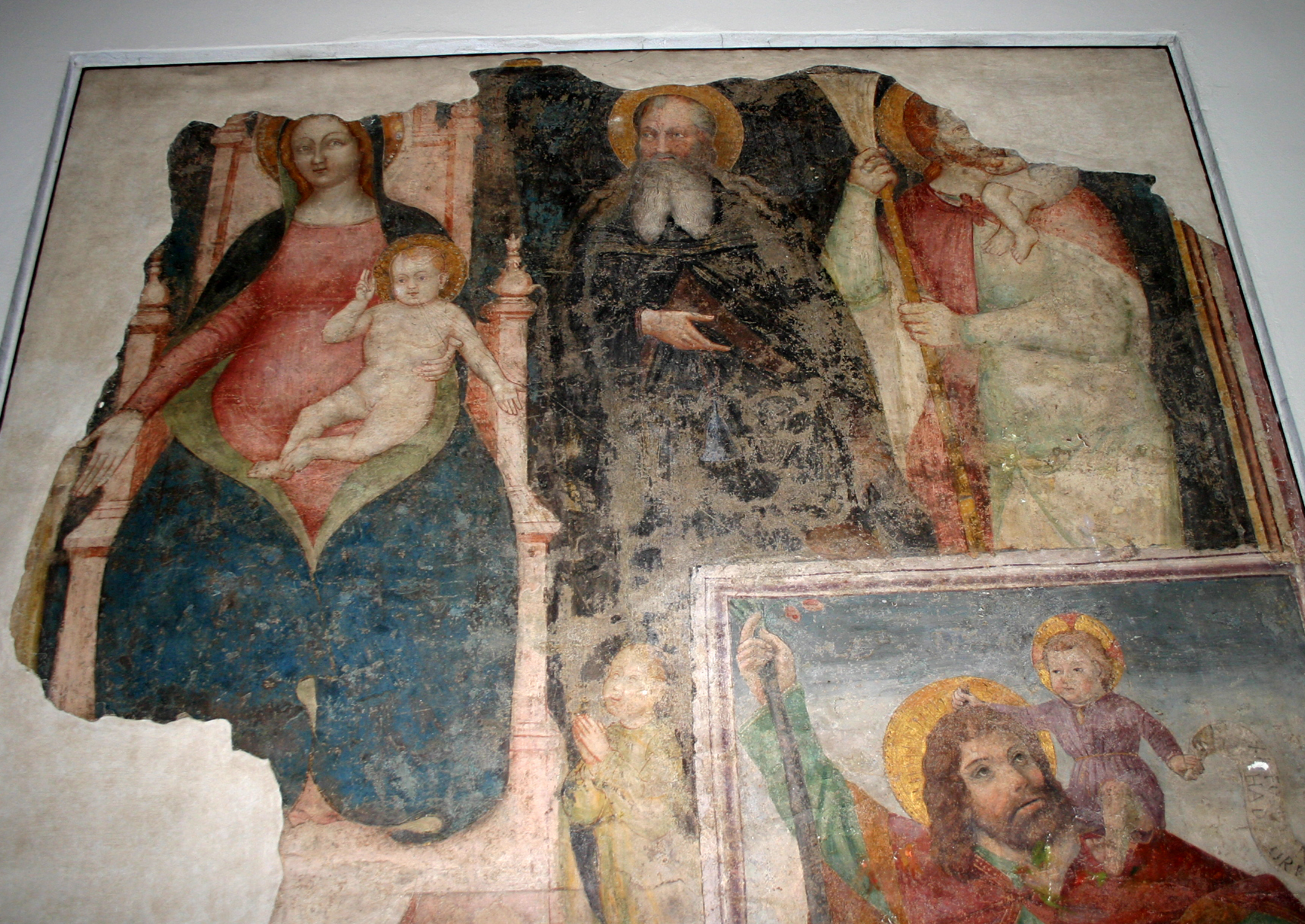
15th-century frescoes.

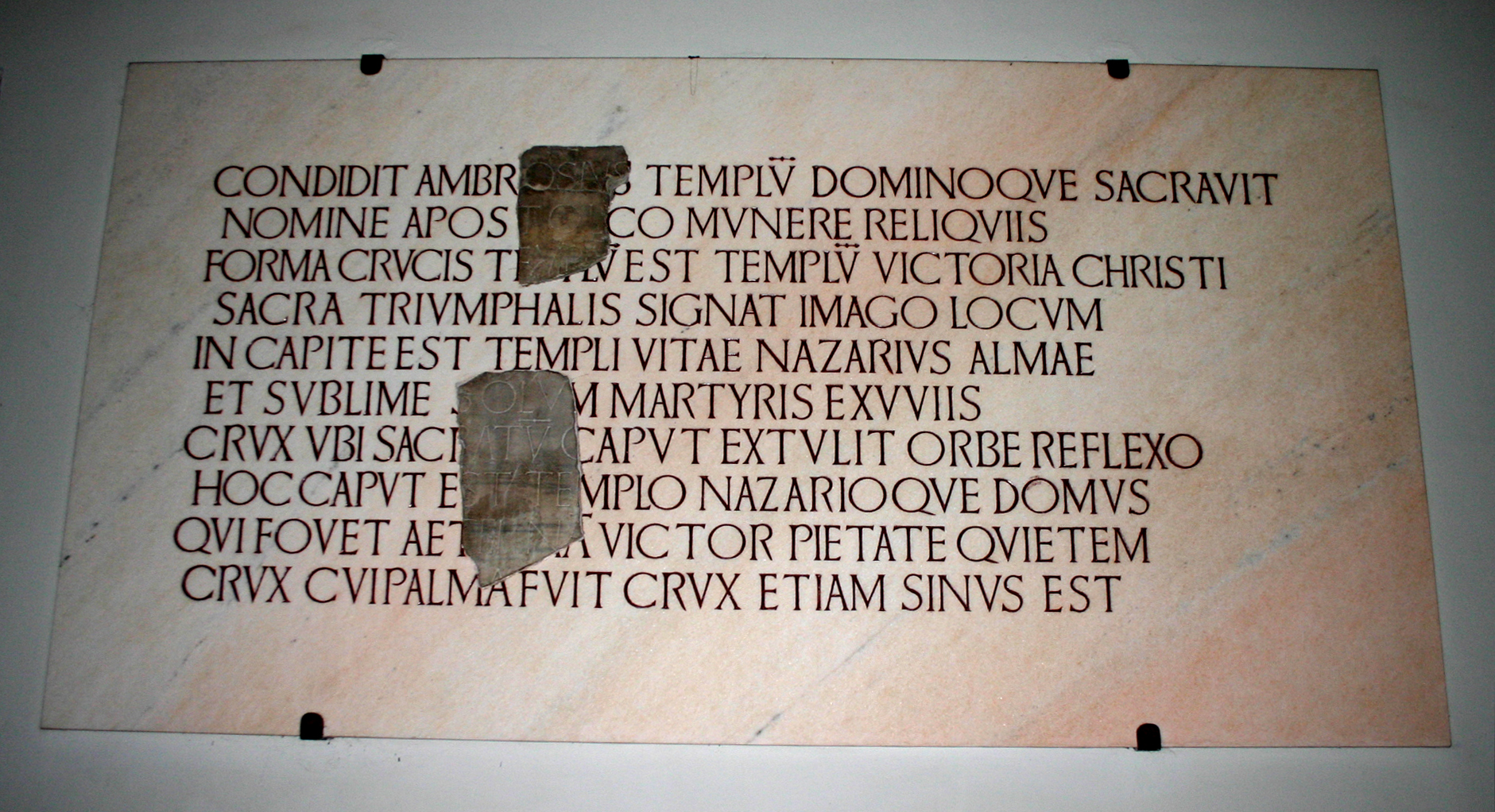
Remains of St Ambrose's inscription.

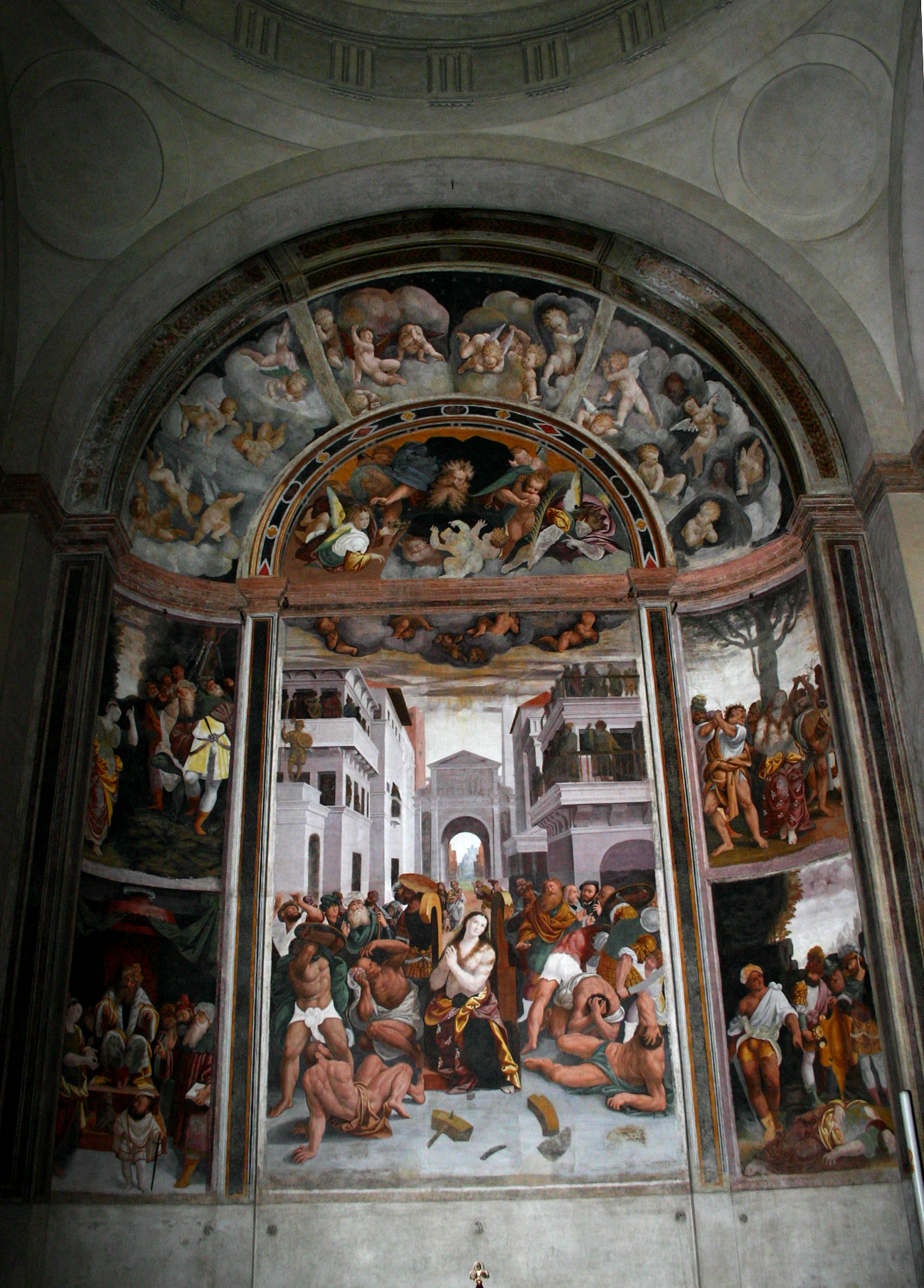
Lanino's fresco of the Martyrdom of St Catherine

== See also ==
- High medieval domes
- 16th-century Western domes
- Early Christian churches in Milan
