= De Magistris =

De Magistris is a surname. Notable people with the surname include:

- Fabrizio De Magistris (fl. 1595–1602), Italian sculptor
- Gianni De Magistris (born 1950), retired Italian water polo player
- Luigi De Magistris (cardinal) (1926–2022), Italian Roman Catholic archbishop
- Luigi de Magistris (politician) (born 1967), Italian politician and magistrate
- Pomponio de Magistris (died 1640), Italian Roman Catholic Bishop
- Simone de Magistris (died 1613), Italian painter and sculptor
