= Our Lady of Help (Busto Arsizio) =

Statue in Busto Arsizio, Italy

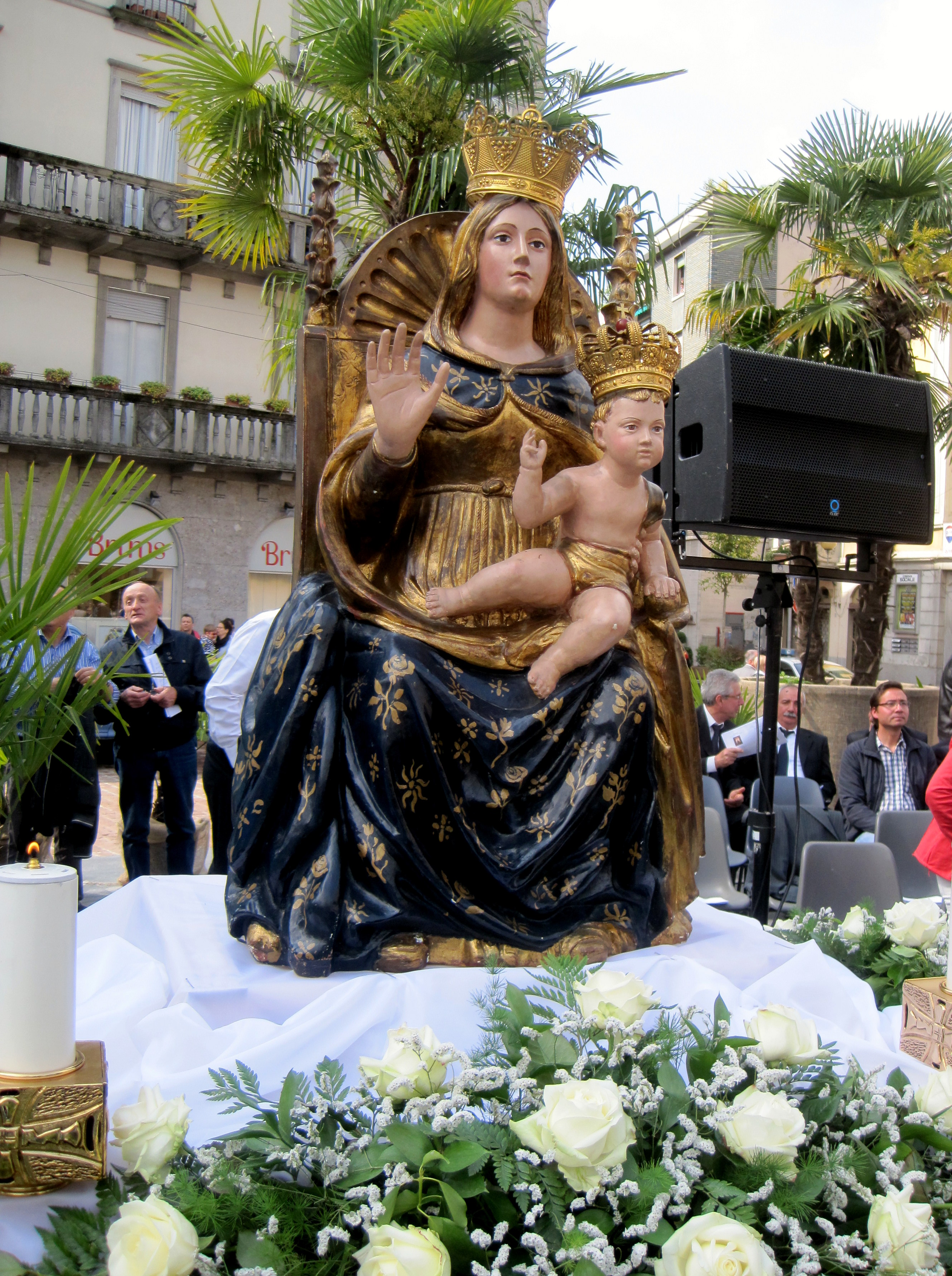

The Our Lady of Help is a statue located in Busto Arsizio. It is in the church of Santa Maria di Piazza, Busto Arsizio and it is attributed to Fabrizio De Magistris, designed in 1602, after the Madonna appeared during a plague outbreak in 1576.

== The statue of Our Lady of Help, Busto Arsizio ==
During the plague, a procession was organized to carry the statue of the Madonna venerated in the church of Santa Maria di Piazza through all the streets of the village.

According to tradition, the depiction of the Madonna, which until then was represented with her right hand on her lap and her left hand holding the Child Jesus, changed its appearance after the unceasing prayers of the Bustocchi. It is said that one morning the image of Our Lady would raise her right arm, showing the palm of her hand, as if she wanted to stop the plague epidemic. It is since then that the Madonna venerated in Busto Arsizio is referred to as Our Lady of Help and is depicted with her left hand engaged in holding the baby Jesus and her right hand raised to stop the plague. As a result, the church of Santa Maria di Piazza became the Sanctuary of Santa Maria di Piazza, as this miracle is said to have occurred inside it.

The devotion to the Blessed Virgin and to the saints resulted in the vow of the entire community, religious and civil, to go on an annual pilgrimage to the Madonna del Monte on St. George's Day, April 24, and to pay homage together to the body of the Beata Giuliana di Busto. February 15 1631 was the day of the cessation of restrictions on the freedom of territory, while on February 26 a procession was organized to give thanks to Our Lady of Help.

== The ‘Santa Maria de la Ayuda’ in Montevideo ==
In Montevideo, Uruguay, in the neighborhood of Villa del Cerro, a statue of Our Lady of Help quite similar to the one in Busto Arsizio is venerated under the name of Santa Maria de la Ayuda.

According to research done by Luigi Giavini, in 1893 a certain Marco Stoppa, a native of Canton Ticino who had emigrated to Uruguay had a statuette depicting Our Lady of Help sent to him with a copy of Leo XIII's papal document pertaining to the coronation of Our Lady of Help of Busto Arsizio and countersigned by Monsignor Giuseppe Tettamanti to attest to the authenticity of the title attributed to the Madonna. When Stoppa returned to Italy, he entrusted the statuette, which had already entered popular devotion in Montevideo, to Guido Branda and his wife Teodora Monnero Gandolfi, originally from Acqui Terme and emigrated to South America around 1910, who in 1913, during a brief stay in Italy, passed through Busto Arsizio to retrieve a larger statue of the Madonna. This statue was placed in a small chapel built by Branda themselves, which received visits from pilgrims from all over Uruguay and even Argentina, as rumors had spread that Stoppa's little statue had performed several miracles.

The church authorities in Montevideo, after several pressures on the Branda family, decided to introduce an image of Our Lady of Help into the pre-existing parish of Our Lady of Arantzazu. When, in the 1920s, the parish passed from the secular clergy to the monks Capuchin, they decided to place a lavish statue of Our Lady of Help in the church. The rector of the sanctuary of Busto Arsizio was then asked for a copy of the statue present in that church. This copy was made in the form of a painting by Friar Augustine of Pavia and was exhibited for some time in the church of St. Anthony in Montevideo, and then transported to the Cerro where on February 10 it was blessed by John Francis Aragon, Archbishop of Montevideo.

On May 11, 1930, a wooden statue of Our Lady of Help, made by Tyrolean sculptor Stuffeser, was crowned, also placed in the parish of Santa María de la Ayuda in Montevideo's Cerro neighborhood.

Devotion to Our Lady of Help spread and many other chapels sprang up in Uruguay, including a shrine in Santa Rosa, in the Department of Canelones.

== The Statue in local depictions ==
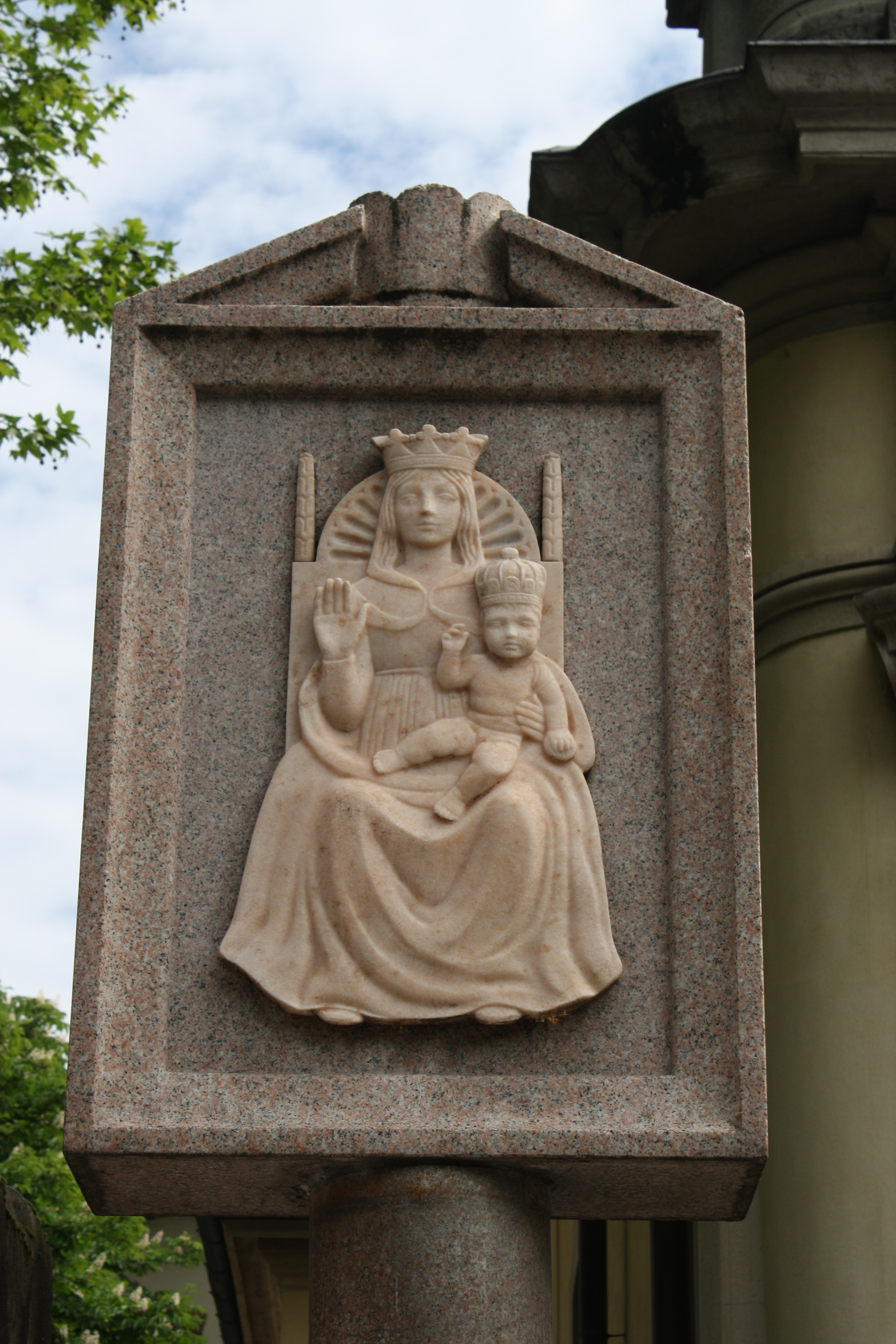
Depiction of the statue

Our Lady of Help is much depicted in Busto Arsizio. The most important of these depictions is the wooden polychrome statue made by the sculptor Fabrizio De Magistris that is located inside the Santa Maria di Piazza; it is the statue that was carried in procession through the village on April 28, 1630 to invoke the end of the plague and that, according to tradition, raised her right hand to stop the disease.

This depiction has since been reproduced in numerous statues and paintings.

At the main entry points of Busto Arsizio are pink granite columns surmounted by a bas-relief of Our Lady of Help, patroness of the city. In the early 2000s a small votive capital dedicated to Our Lady of Help was built in the San Giuseppe neighborhood, near the Ospedale di Circolo di Busto Arsizio, at the intersection of Sassi, Savona, Vipiteno, Giulio Bizzozero and Arnaldo da Brescia streets.

Our Lady of Help is also used as the logo of Azienda Ospedaliera Ospedale di Circolo di Busto Arsizio.

== See also ==
- Monuments of Busto Arsizio

== Bibliography ==
- Giavini, Luigi (1997). Sui sentieri dell'emigrazione da Busto Arsizio al Sud-America. Olgiate Olona: Rotary Club Busto-Gallarate-Legnano "Ticino".
