= Santa Maria di Piazza, Busto Arsizio =

Church in Lombardy, Italy

Coordinates: 45°36′43″N 8°51′01″E

Santuario di Santa Maria di Piazza
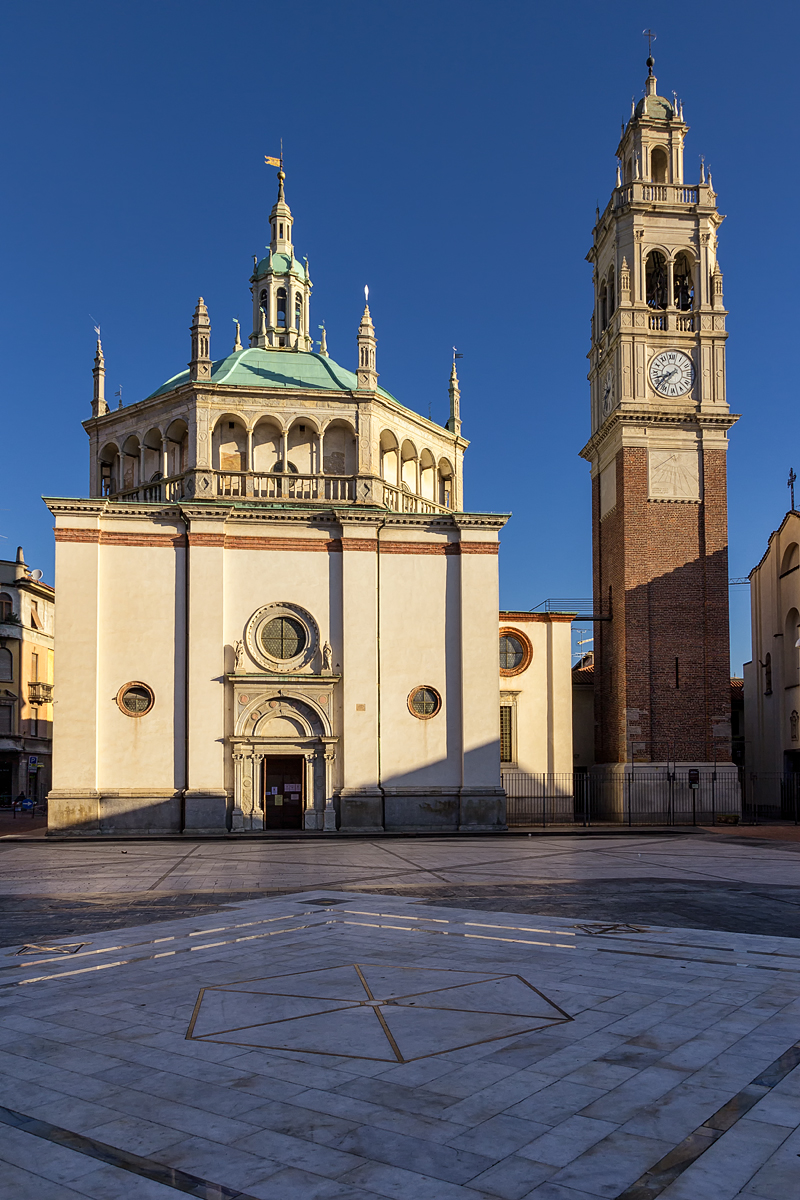
- Santuario di Santa Maria di Piazza
- Location: Busto Arsizio, Lombardy
- Country: Italy
- Denomination: Roman Catholic

History
- Founded: 1300

Architecture
- Architect: Antonio da Lonate
- Style: Renaissance
- Years built: 1515-1522

Administration
- Diocese: Diocese of Milan
- Parish: San Giovanni Battista

The Santuario di Santa Maria di Piazza (also known as the shrine of the Blessed Virgin of Help) is located in the historic center of Busto Arsizio, Italy, where an earlier church dedicated to the Virgin Mary stood, which in turn had replaced a chapel dating back to the time of Christianization. This Marian shrine was quickly built between 1515 and 1522. It is adjacent to the church of Sant'Antonio Abate

Two names appear in the documents dealing with the construction of the temple: that of Antonio da Lonate (author of the model for the Vigevano Duomo) and that of "magistro Tomaxio ingeniero", probably Tommaso Rodari, the well-known sculptor and architect active in the Como cathedral, a pupil of Giovanni Antonio Amadeo. Antonio da Lonate set the central plan, for which a Bramantesque design, "Bramanti secutus exemplar" has been speculated; the latter would have executed the two portals to the west and south, and perhaps the elegant loggia in the tambour under the dome similar to the tiburium of the sanctuary of the Beata Vergine dei Miracoli at Saronno, which is attributed to Amadeo.

== History ==
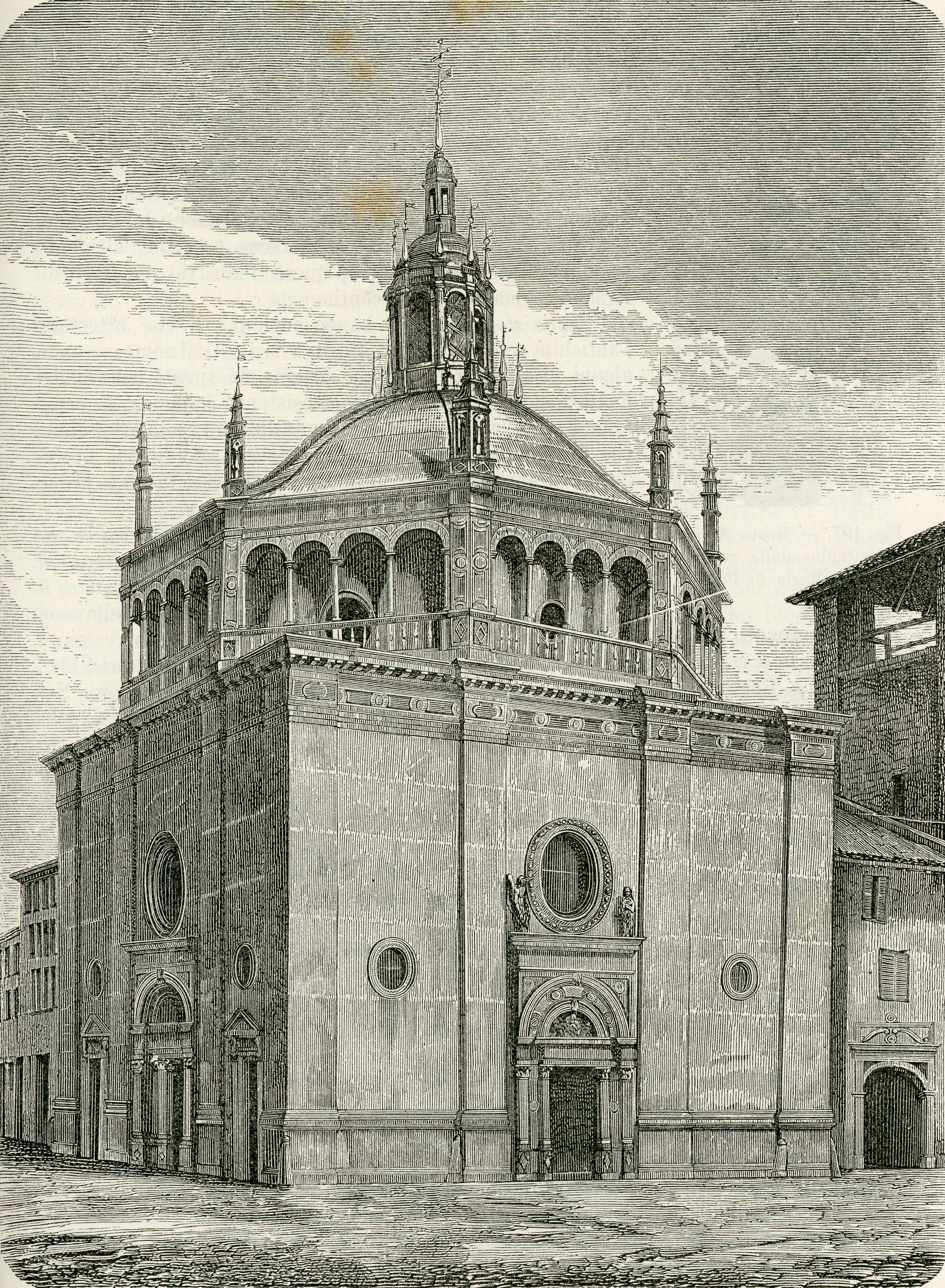
The Church in the 19th century

The ancient building, according to seventeenth-century testimonies, had a square plan of 5 m on each side, but it was already probably a fourteenth-century remake of the original building. The church, in its typical forms of Romanesque architecture, was consecrated in 1346 by a bishop named Francesco, delegate of the archbishop Giovanni Visconti. All that remains today of this ancient building is the stone rondel placed at the top of the present presbytery and depicting in a relief the Madonna and Child.

Here in 1358 a chaplaincy was established by Antonio Crespi: thus masses were celebrated every day by a priest chosen by the Crespi family. This chaplaincy took the name of Saint Catherine, and an altar was named after the saint. Another chaplaincy, named Santa Maria, was established in 1485 by Donato Crespi. To this second chaplaincy in 1504 the curia of Milan assigned the priest Francesco Crespi Roberti (or de Robertis), who later became rector of the basilica di San Giovanni Battista.

In the Libro della Decima (a text that listed private entities that owned real estate subject to taxation) of 1399, the Consorzio di Santa Maria di Piazza appears for the first time. This, like the other eight consortiums in Busto Arsizio, had its headquarters in a church (in this case that of Santa Maria) and members met periodically bringing an offering; these offerings would then be given to members in need, to charity for the poor or to aid churches.

Between the 14th century and the 16th century, the town of Busto Arsizio grew in wealth, size and influence within the Duchy of Milan. This led to the desire to erect a new religious building to match this rise. The first stone of this new church, which replaced the Romanesque one of Santa Maria, on laid in 1517 and is still visible embedded in the eastern facade. A number of people, mainly from the more educated part of the Bustoccan population, promoted this rebuilding: among them, the rectors of the basilica and founders of the capitular library of St. John the Baptist Francesco and Bernardino Crespi, the former of whom was also chaplain of St. Mary's; the Scuola dei Poveri; and the municipality. It is likely, though not established, that Galeazzo Visconti, feudatory of Busto since 1488, supported the initiative. There were also many bequests from the clergy and civilian population, particularly dating back to 1524, the year in which the village was hit by an epidemic of plague.

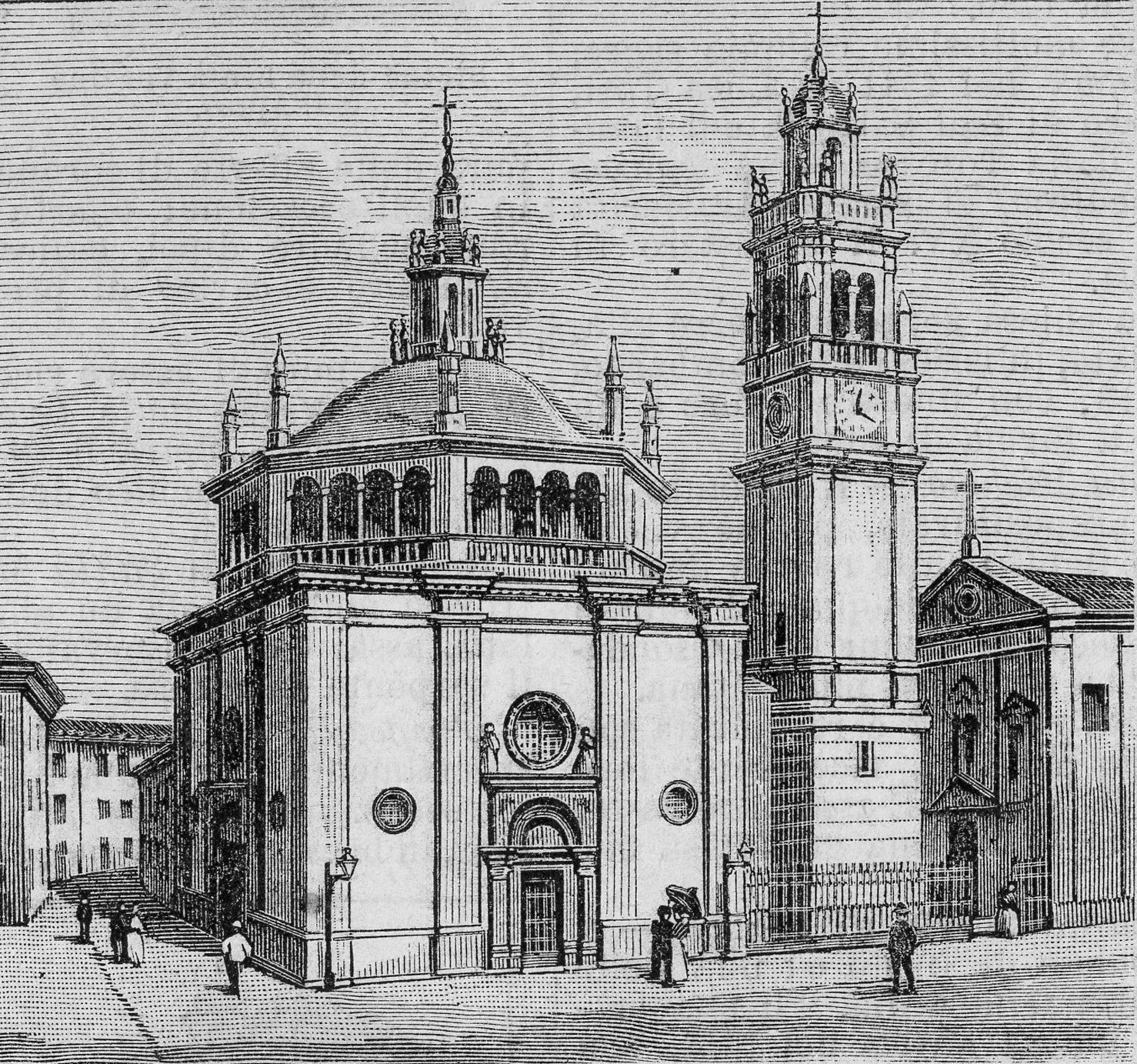
The Church in the early 20th century

The reconstruction of the church was entrusted to Antonio da Lonate who, as reported by the chronicler Antonio Crespi Castoldi, followed a bramantesco design. I following subsequent studies and research carried out by Pio Bondioli, it can be said that Antonio da Lonate was responsible for the design of the basic wall structure, while the completion and embellishments were the work of Tommaso Rodari. Presenting typical features of Rodari's work are the portals of the south and west facades.

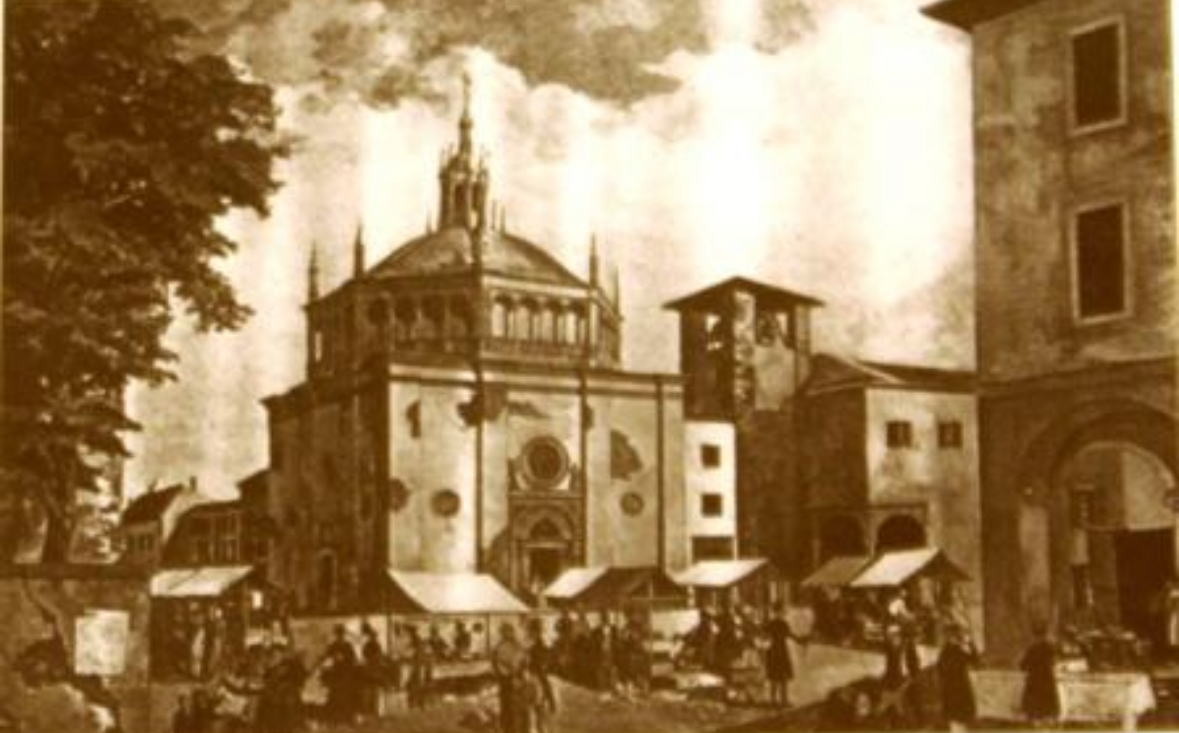
Santa Maria di Piazza before the construction of the bell tower

In 1873, the comprehensive restoration work entrusted to Carlo Maciachini of the building began and involved the tiburium's loggias, the plasterwork of the exterior walls, the dome and architecture, and the copper roofing; the side doors of the western facade, opened in 1605, were bricked up, while the one on the southern facade was reopened. The loggia of the tiburium, the plinths at the base of the interior and exterior walls, the door knockers, the rainwater drainage, and the side altars, which were demolished and replaced (the one on the left would later be removed with the 1939-43 restorations, while the one on the right, with the statue of the statue of the Madonna dell'Aiuto, was moved to the sanctuary of the Sacred Heart in Busto Arsizio in 1912 and replaced). The compasses were replaced, and other interventions affected the windows, the balustrade, the floor, the wooden statues in the niches, and the organ, which was made later and then transferred to the church of Sant'Edoardo in Busto Arsizio, where it is still located today. For the statue of the Madonn, Maciachini designed a small throne for exhibitions and processions. During these works the painter Luigi Cavenaghi was responsible for the pictorial restoration of the entire interior surface.

The piazza of the church was one of the sites were the Olympic flame of the 2026 Winter Olympics passed.

== Architectural design ==
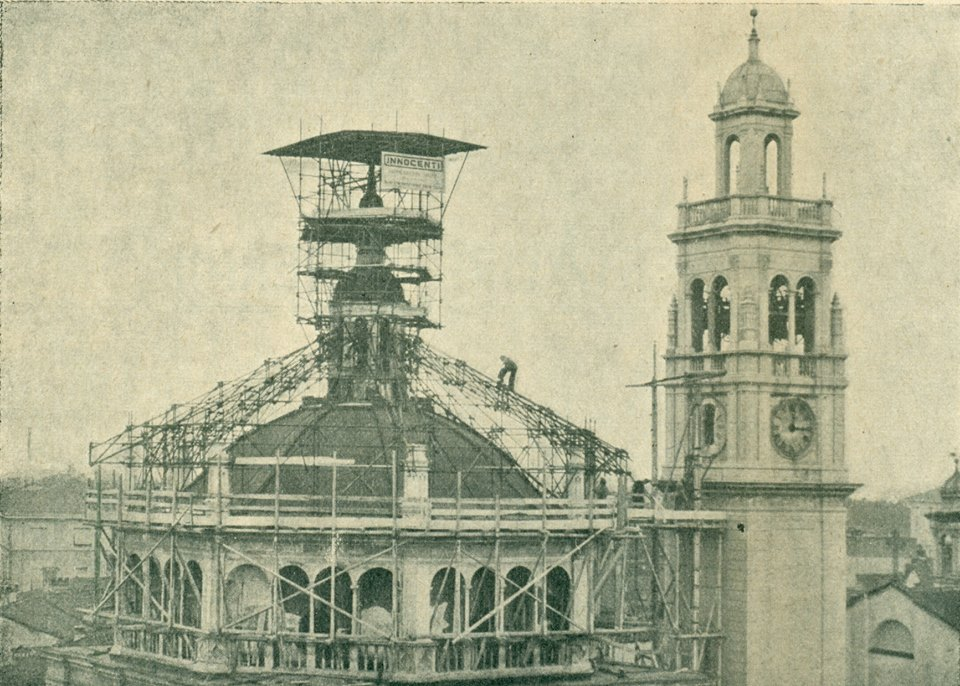
The dome of the church during restoration, 1939-1943

Internally, the lower, square part, which is cut at the corners by diagonal arches forming niches and bonnets, refers back to Leonardo da Vinci's numerous studies of centrally planned churches, while the octagonal drum with a ring of niches (the crown of the 12 saints) and the eight nails of the covering vault echo the examples of the Church of Santa Maria di Canepanova in Pavia and of the Civic Temple of the Blessed Virgin Incoronata in Lodi and Santa Maria della Croce in Crema.

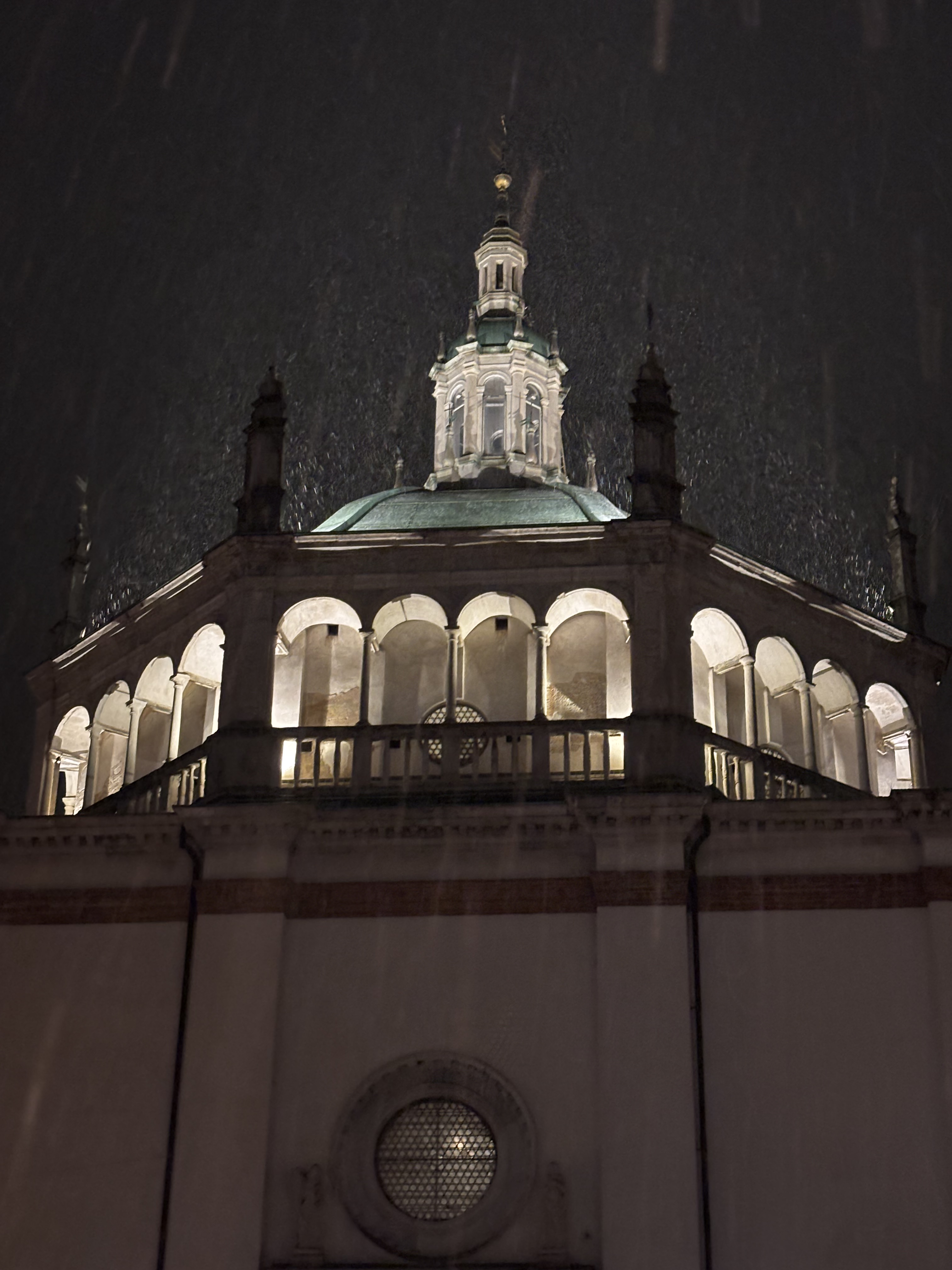
The dome during a snowstorm, November 2024

The rigorous cubic volume punctuated by pilasters is surmounted by a tiburium with gugliotti and lantern that interprets in lighter and more elegant forms the typology of the Lombard tradition.

The two portals of the south and west facades, the work of Tommaso Rodari, are composed of two parts: the lower one has pilasters and geometric ornaments of Renaissance character; in the upper part two arches, inscribed in each other, are interspersed with patere, rectangles and broken out. Above the major arch a beam surmounts two triangular spaces ornamented with red stone roundels like those found in the doors of the Cathedral of Como.

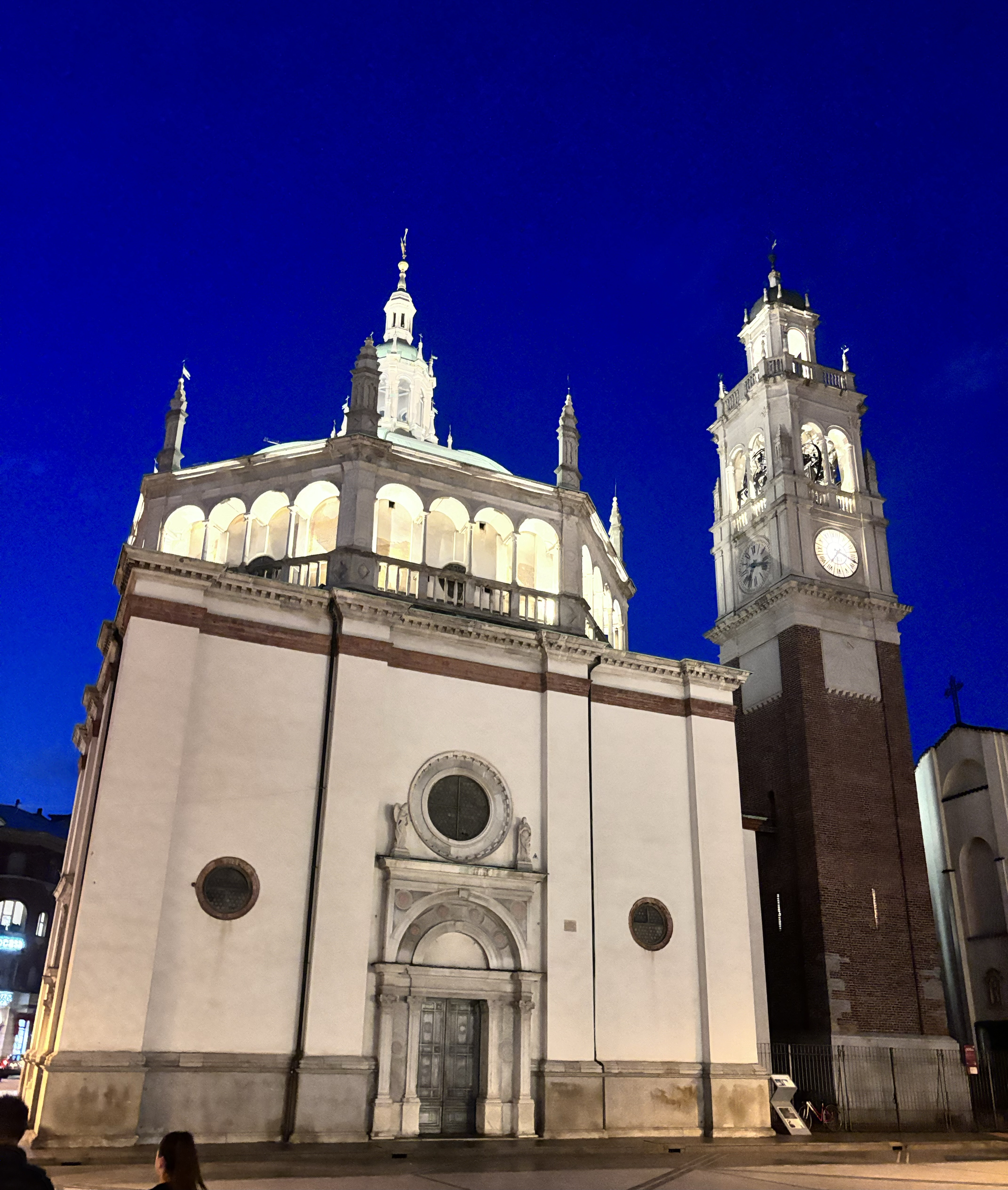
The church at night

Of the shrine of Santa Maria there is an exact copy, but smaller, in Crespi d'Adda, a town listed as a World Heritage Site by UNESCO. Of the statue of Our Lady there is an exact copy in Uruguay in Montevideo, in the church of the popular neighborhood of Cerro.

=== Interior ===
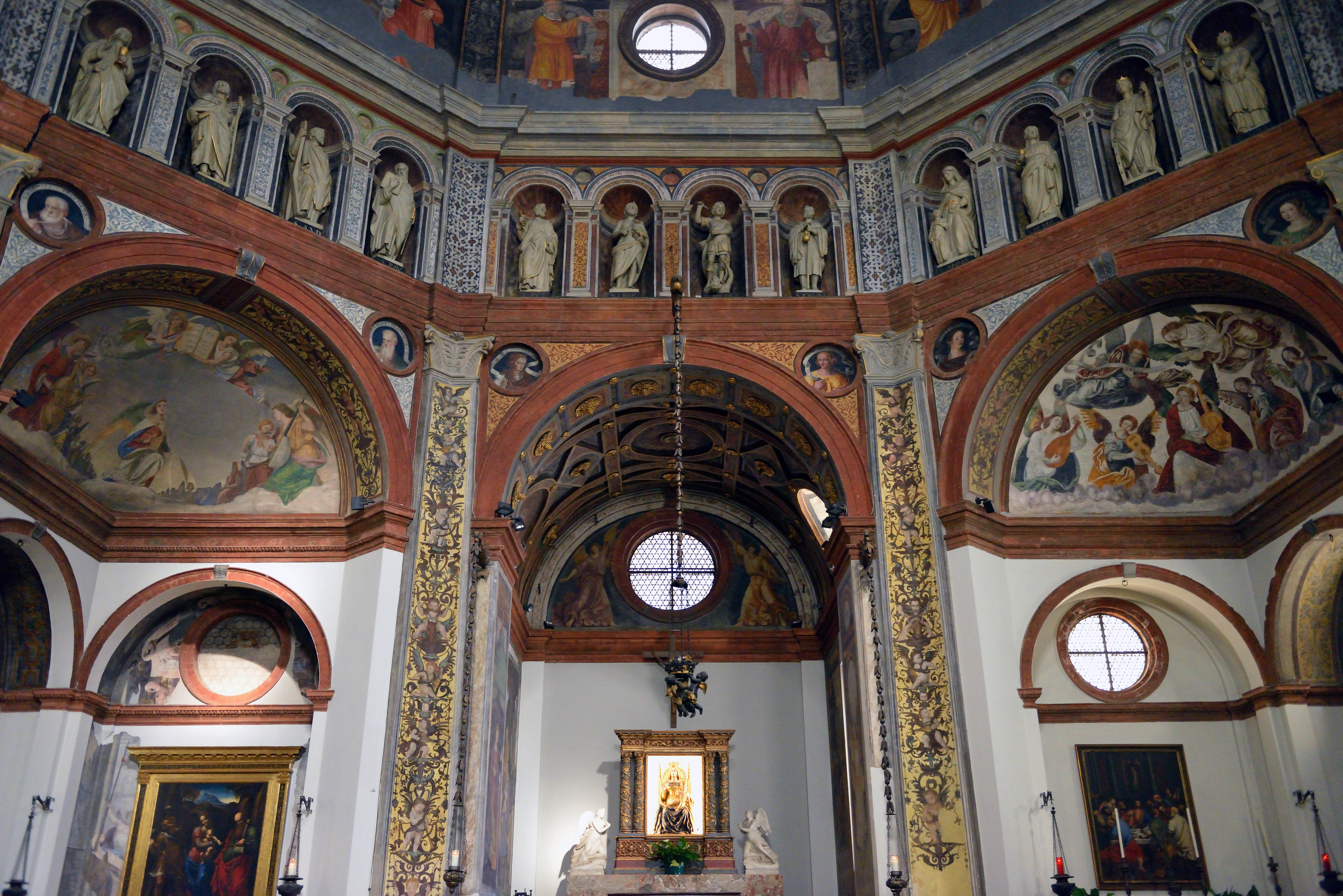
The interior of the church

The dome was frescoed by Giovanni Crespi, grandfather of Giovan Battista Crespi known as Il Cerano, in 1531. At the same time Francesco Tatti executed decorations in the lower order. The segments of the dome were decorated with dozens of golden stars, while the pillars were decorated with grotesques. In the lower band of the tiburium, the prophets and the sibyls were painted: these figures are illuminated by oculi, on the sides of which two figures are depicted, while two others are placed on the sides of the eight arches below, for a total of sixteen male and as many female figures. Among the male figures, in addition to the eleven scriptural prophets, are Moses, Aaron, David, Solomon and Jonah, while in addition to the sibyls, the other female figures are those of Eve, Rachel, Ester and Judith.

The frescoes in the chancel 1542 are by Giovan Battista della Cerva a pupil of Gaudenzio Ferrari and depict respectively: The Annunciation on the pillars; Adoration of the Magi on the left wall; and Adoration of the Shepherds on the right wall. To della Cerva are also attributed the Musician Angels in the sail of the corner arch, to the right of the chancel, as well as the angels and pilasters of the decoration.

The Last Supper, in the altar to the right of the high altar is by Gaudenzio Ferrari and Giovan Battista della Cerva, while the paintings in the lunettes of the portals, depicting the Madonna with Child, St. John and Musician Angels (west) and the Madonna of the Rosary with Child and Putti (south) are attributed to Raffaele Crespi. These two frescoes were detached in 1939 because of their critical state of preservation and were never relocated.

On the altar to the left of the chancel is a copy of the lost Madonna of Victories by Giovan Paolo Lomazzo.

On the right wall, there is a triptych depicting the Madonna and Child with Saints previously attributed to Francesco Melzi, on deposit from the Pinacoteca di Brera

On the left wall The Madonna and Child, Saint Gervasius and Protase, Saint Catherine and Justina (1544) is by Giacomo Francia, while the magnificent Polyptych of the Assumption is by Gaudenzio Ferrari.

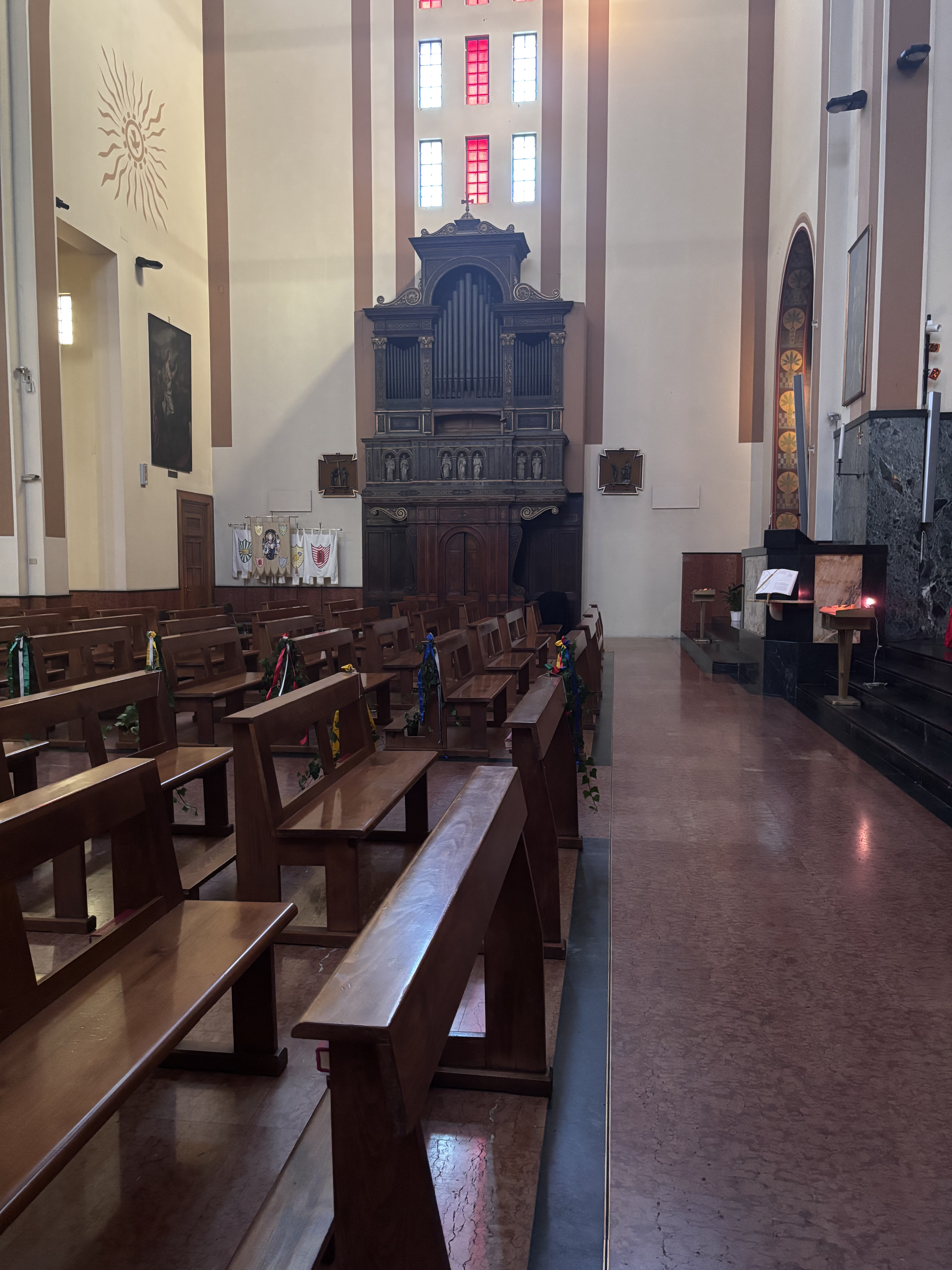
The organ of the church of Saint Edward, it used to belong to the Sanctuary of Santa Maria di Piazza

The church's organ was donated to the Church of Saint Edward.

=== Bell Tower ===
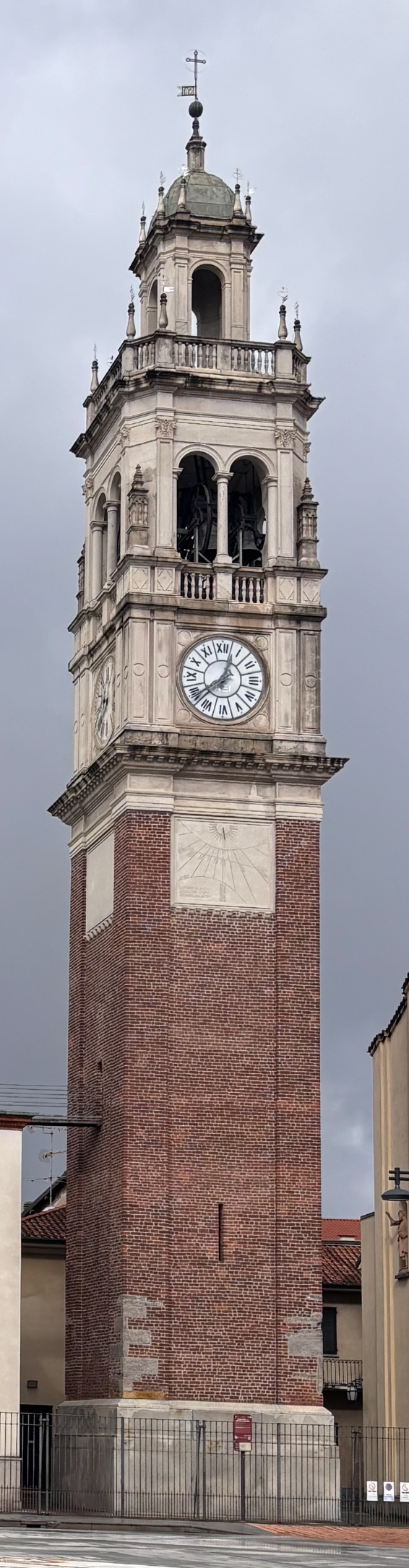
Bell tower of Santa Maria di Piazza

The brick bell tower dates back to 1584. In 1874 Giuseppe Tettamanti, provost of Busto Arsizio, commissioned Carlo Maciachini to design an elevation of the bell tower. The project was meant to be completed the same year, but due to disputes with the State Property Authority, work could not begin until March 23, 1886. At first, the ancient 16th-century tower was clad with a high zoccolo of granite and a plaster to simulate a rusticated ashlar (removed with the 1939-43 restorations). The top body of the belfry was then added, consisting of a square prism for the clock, echoing the shape of the church plan, the belfry cell, echoing the loggia and jetties of the church, on which an aedicule was built, echoing the church's dome and lantern. These works were completed in 1887 and tested by Maciachini himself on January 15 of that year.

== Statue of Our Lady of Help ==
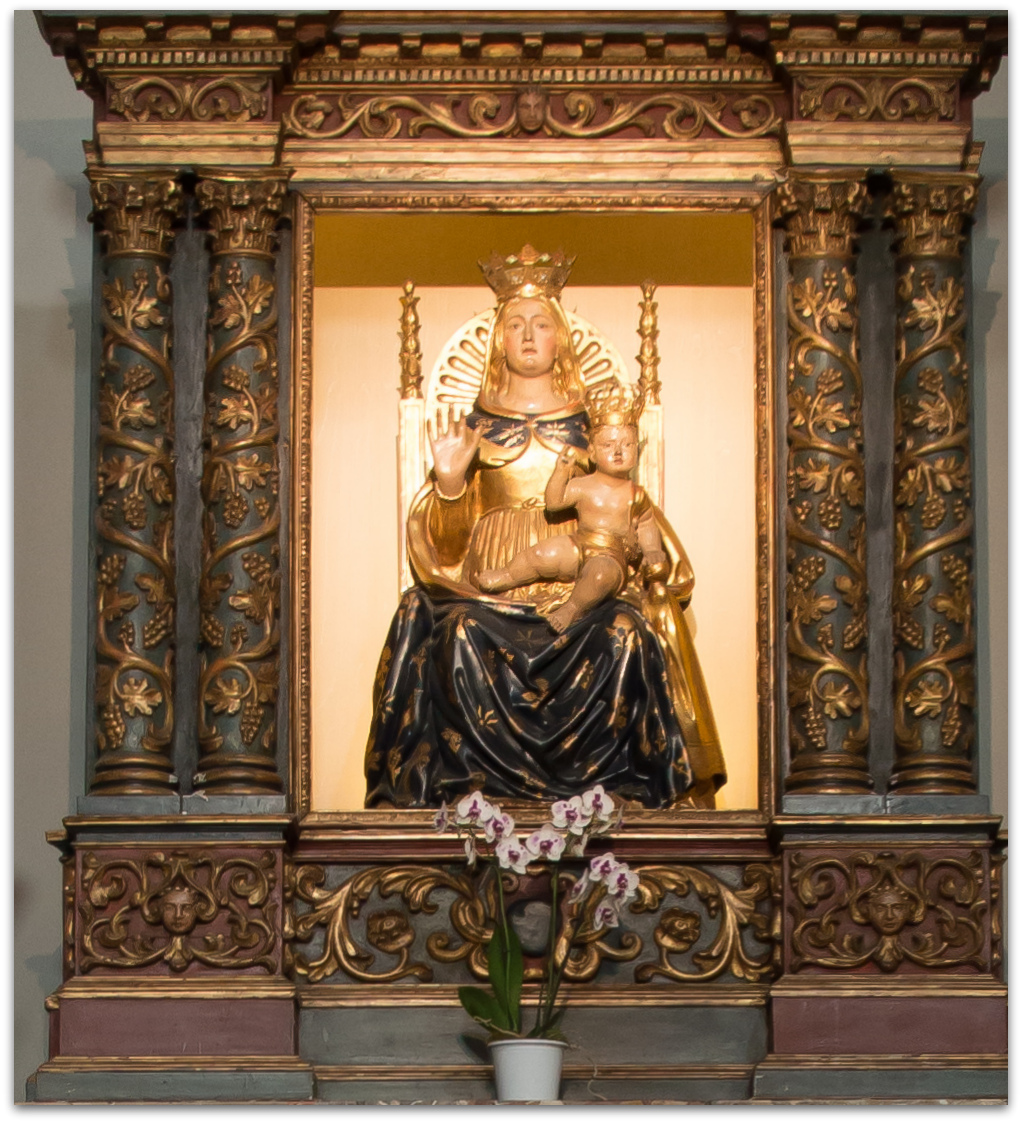
The statue of the Madonna dell'Aiuto

The polychrome wooden statue of the Madonna dell'Aiuto is placed above the altar in the center of the apse space. The simulacrum, dating from 1602, is a work attributed to Fabrizio De Magistris. The statue, which was crowned in 1895 by beatus Cardinal Andrea Ferrari, is protected by a shrine flanked by two 16th-century marble angels. The symmetry and centrality of the figure of Mary (underscored by the twists of the cathedra) highlight the asymmetrical dynamism of the Child, who is placed sideways, as if sliding on the Mother's knee. Thus, the break between the hieraticity of the image of the Madonna and that of the Child, who seems to be coming towards the onlooker, is evident. In this particularity, De Magistris's work constitutes an innovation from traditional iconicity.

The statues in the niches are also by Fabrizio De Magistris.

== See also ==
- History of Busto Arsizio
- Monuments of Busto Arsizio
- Churches of Busto Arsizio

== Sources ==
- Magini, Giuseppe (1997). Santa Maria di Piazza, un simbolo per Busto Arsizio (in Italian). Busto Arsizio: Mariani Artigrafiche.
- Bertolli, Franco (2017). "Santa Maria di Piazza. Il monumento, l'arredo artistico, il culto". Almanacco della Famiglia Bustocca per l'anno 2017 (in Italian). Busto Arsizio: La Famiglia Bustocca. pp. 4–39.
- Spada, Augusto (2002). "Interventi di Carlo Maciachini a Busto Arsizio". In Luca Rinaldi (ed.). Machiachini: architetto e restauratore. Atti del Convegno di Induno Olona (in Italian). Induno Olona: Comune di Induno Olona.
