= Fabrizio De Magistris =

Italian Sculptor

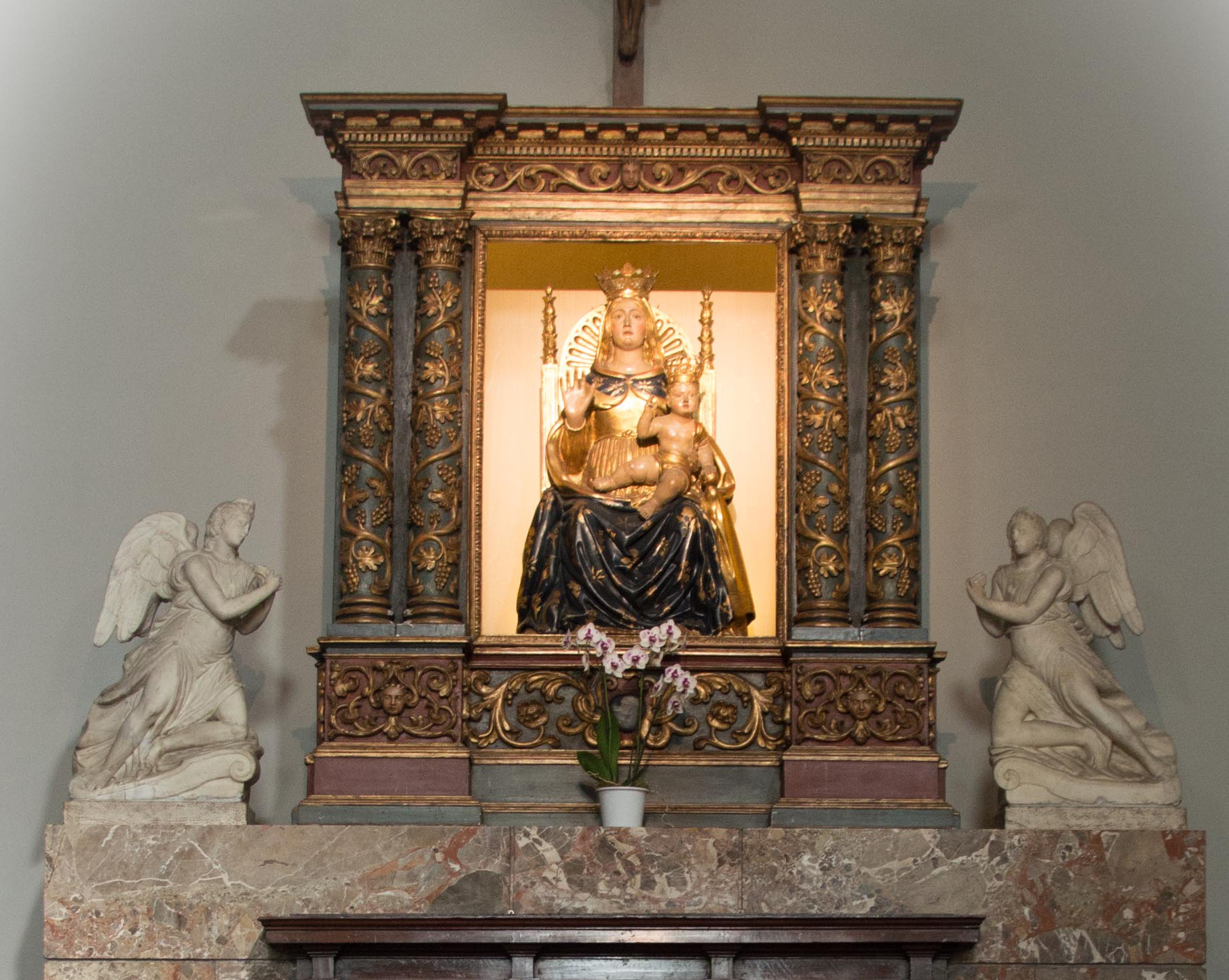
One of De Magistris' most famous works, the Statue of La Madonna dell’aiuto

Fabrizio De Magistris (fl. 1595-1602) was an Italian sculptor active in Lombardy between 1595 and 1602.

== Biography ==
The artist remains almost unknown, and the only certain period of his activity is from 1595 to 1602.

The few surviving works are the thirty-two wooden statues of pioppo in the Sanctuary of Santa Maria di Piazza and a gilded wooden Assumption in Gorla Maggiore, although it was originally located in Busto Arsizio.

We also know that the artist worked with Giovanni Ambrogio Santagostino (author of the wooden choir of Church of San Vittore al Corpo), to make the tabernacle of the Basilica of San Giovanni Battista, Busto Arsizio, now lost in the reconstruction of the church.

De Magistris showed stylistic similarities with artists active in the Milan Cathedral such as Cristoforo Prestinari, Andrea Rinaldi, Pietro Antonio Daverio and Francesco Brambilla.

De Magistris had at least one child, whose death was recorded in the Parish of San Giovanni, Busto Arsizio, on 14 August 1602.
