= Pietro Antonio Daverio =

17th-century Italian sculptor

- Bust of Francesco Sforza
- Born: 1564; Milan, Duchy of Milan
- Died: 1621 or 1622; Milan, Duchy of Milan
- Known for: Sculptor
- Movement: Mannerism
- Spouse: Margherita Brambilla

Pietro Antonio Daverio (Milan, 1564 – Milan, 1621/1622) was an Italian Mannerist sculptor.

== Biography ==
Very little is known about Daverio's early life. He may have been born near the Basilica of San Babila in Milan in 1564. He was a pupil of Francesco Brambilla whose daughter Margherita he married and by whom he had several children. His sister Vittoria married the painter Enea Salmeggia.

The earliest documented information about his activity as a sculptor is a payment dated 28 July 1588 from the Veneranda Fabbrica del Duomo di Milano to Maestro Pietro Antonio Daverio "for completing the statue of St. Gervasius began by Antonio Padoano, who died before its completion" (magistro Pietro Antonio Daverio, qual ha finito la statua di s. Gervasio incominciata dal Padoano, qual è morto avanti il finimento di essa). In the absence of information about his apprenticeship, it is assumed that he trained at the major construction site of Milan Cathedral, where he is reported to have worked until 1619, producing numerous sculptures.

His ability to complete and interpret the works of more renowned sculptors, including Francesco Brambilla, meant that he always played a minor role in the workshop of Milan Cathedral. In 1595, he was commissioned to create a bust of St. Charles Borromeo for the Ospedale Maggiore in Milan. Completed in 1603, the bust is sober and well executed. As the subject had been depicted several times before, it was essential to create a portrait that captured his likeness. However, Daverio knew how to make it original by animating the bishop's cope and mitre with decorative details.

A few years later, he was commissioned to make a bust of Francesco Sforza, for which there is evidence of a payment of 180 lire in 1606. The subject was identifiable only on iconographic documentation and not from a direct source, but Daverio managed to give a correct image of him, enclosed in his embroidered armor enclosed within a cloak knotted on his shoulders, his face with a sweet expression is furrowed by the wrinkles of age that weigh down his features. The bust was saved from the bombing during World War II.

He always remained faithful to his late Mannerist training by Brambilla, and although he collaborated with Gian Andrea Biffi's to the creation of the statue of the Pietà to be placed on the funeral monument of Pellegrino Tibaldi, he never allowed himself to be influenced by the more restless style of the young Milanese.

The last commissions appear to be two statues depicting St. Cantianilla and a St. Pelagia. From the Annals it appears that payment for this last work was delivered to his son Carlo after his death at the turn of 1621–1622.

== Bibliography ==
- Guarnaschelli, Alda (1987). "Daverio, Pietro Antonio". Dizionario Biografico degli Italiani (in Italian). Vol. 33: D'Asaro–De Foresta. Rome: Institute of the Italian Encyclopaedia. ISBN 978-88-12-00032-6.
