= Tommaso Rodari =

Swiss-Italian sculptor and architect

- Born: 1460; Maroggia, Commune of Como
- Died: 1525 (aged 64–65); Como, Commune of Como
- Occupation: Architect
- Years active: 1484–1525

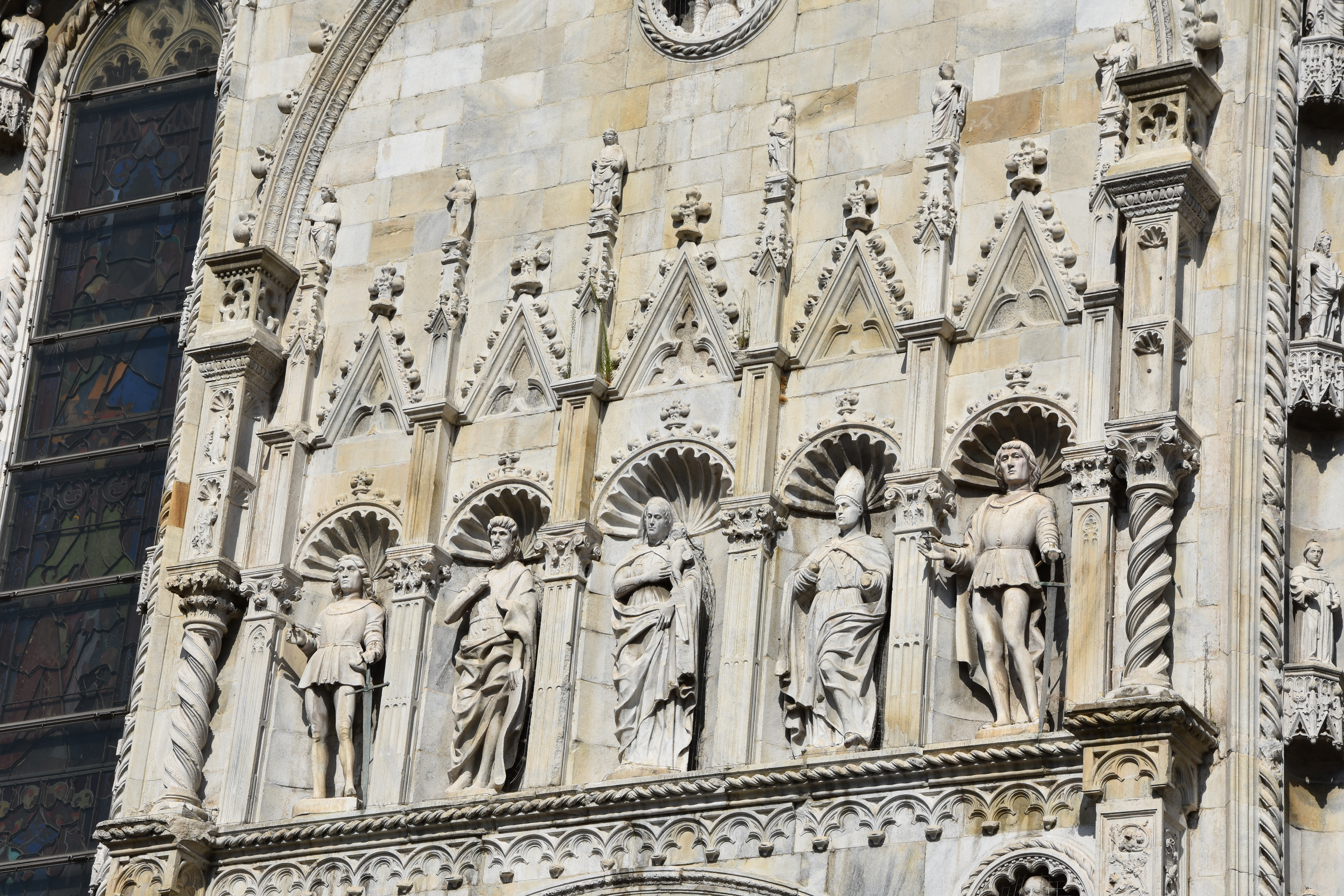
Statues of main portal in the Como Cathedral

Tommaso Rodari (Lombard: Tomas Rodee; 1460–1525) was a Swiss-Italian sculptor and architect.

== Biography ==
He was the son of sculptor Giovanni Rodari and the brother of Donato, Giacomo, and Bernardino, all sculptors. As a young man he worked at the Certosa di Pavia in the school of Giovanni Antonio Amadeo.

From 1484 to 1509 he worked at the Como Cathedral, where on 20 July 1487 he was appointed engineer of the factory. At the same time he enlarged the tribune of the church of San Maurizio in Ponte in Valtellina.

Also he designed the Sanctuary of the Madonna of Tirano dedicated to the Madonna who appeared in Tirano on 29 September 1504.

He also built the Sanctuary of Santa Maria di Piazza in Busto Arsizio and the Collegiate Church of Santi Pietro e Stefano in Bellinzona, as well as being active at the Sanctuary of the Assunta di Morbegno in Morbegno. Several of his works can be found in the Church of San Zenone in Campione d'Italia.
