= Church of Sant'Antonio Abate, Busto Arsizio =

Church in Busto Arsizio, Italy

Coordinates: 45.6118°N 8.8507°E

Church of Sant’Antonio Abate
- Church of Sant’Antonio Abate in Santa Maria di Piazza
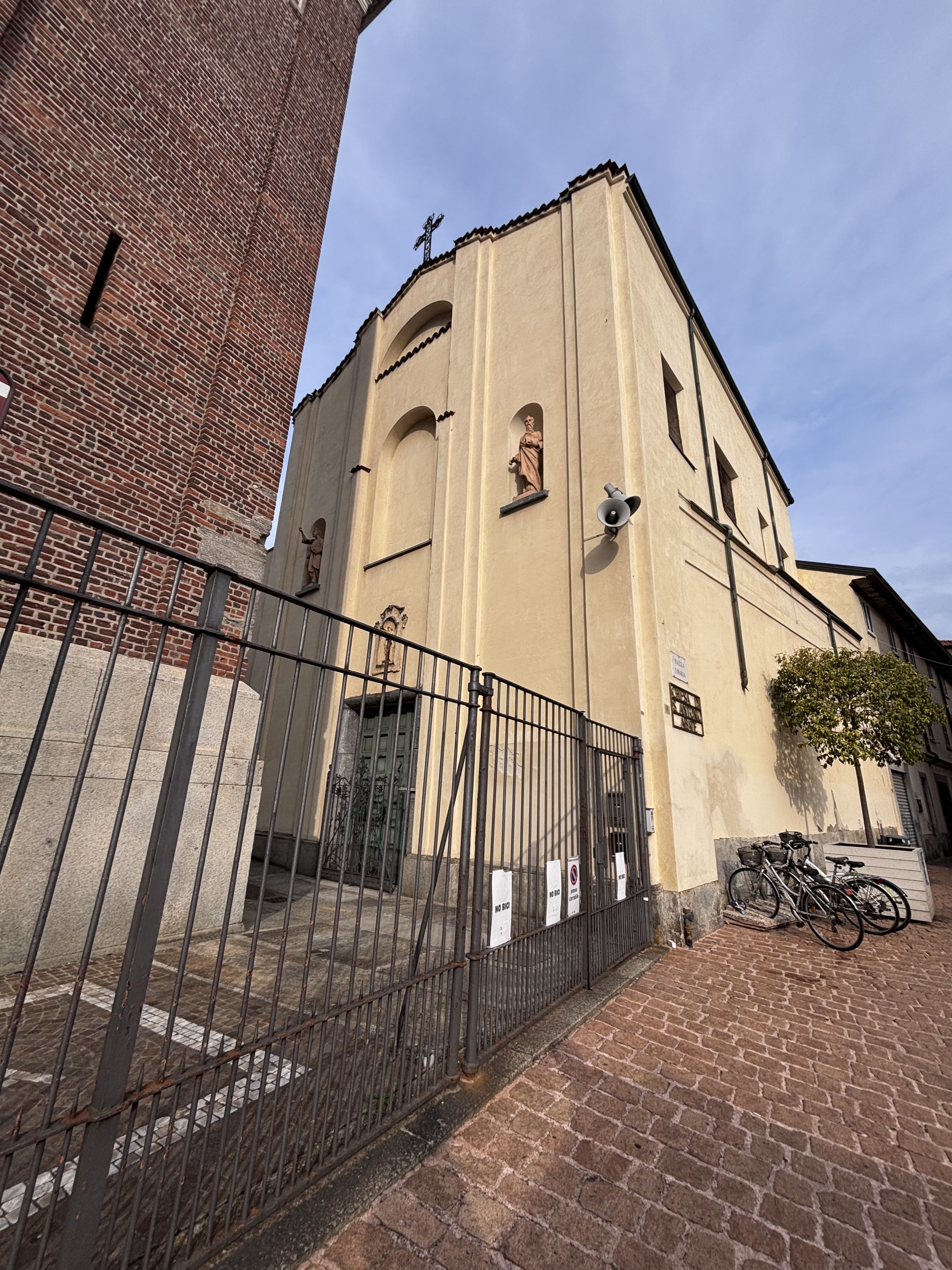
- Church of Sant’Antonio Abate
- Location: Busto Arsizio, Lombardy
- Country: Italy
- Denomination: Roman Catholic

History
- Founded: 1363
- Dedication: Saint Anthony Abbot
- Dedicated: 1363
- Consecrated: 1360s

Administration
- Diocese: Diocese of Milan
- Parish: Santa Maria di Piazza

The Church of Sant’Antonio Abate is a church located in Piazza Santa Maria, Busto Arsizio. It is adjacent to the bell tower of Santa Maria di Piazza.

== History ==
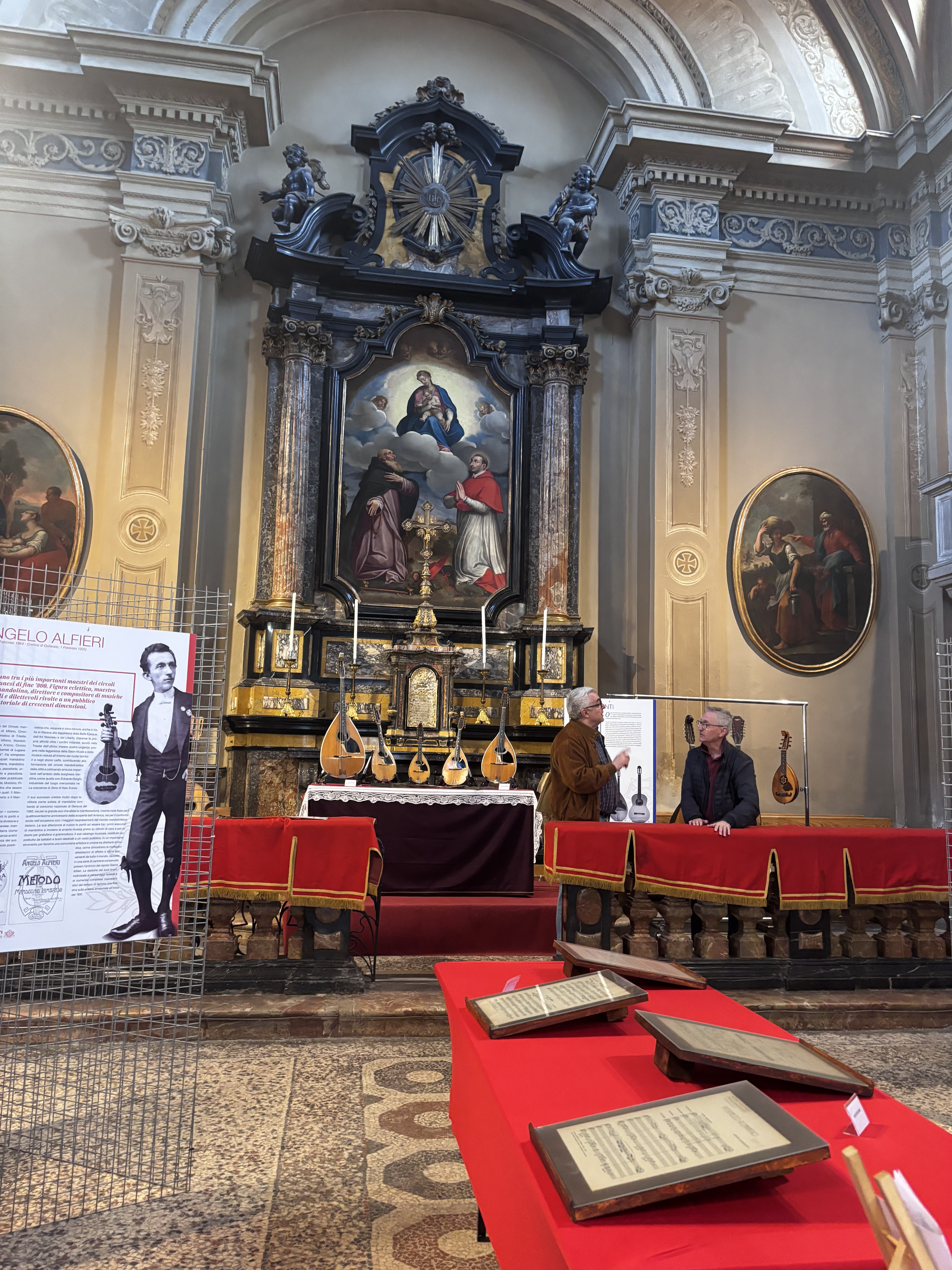
The church’s interior

The construction of the church was ordered by Cristoforo de Medicis, and the first stone was placed in 1363. It was dedicated to Saint Anthony Abbot, to whom the Bustocchi were devoted to.

In the 15th and 16th century the church housed the School of Sant’Antonio, and in 1572 the building was expanded by orders of Pietro Antonio Crespi Castoldi, following directions from Carlo Borromeo. The structure had two floors and a rectangular shape. The church was decorated in the 16th century by Paolo Gnocchi. It was once again expanded between 1669 and 1672, and became adjacent to the bell tower of Santa Maria di Piazza.

In 1889 the portico of the church was removed to free up space and the façade was renovated by Carlo Maciachini. The façade’s decorations were removed just 50 years later, in 1939. In 1975, a statue of Saint Anthony was placed above the entrance. Nowadays the church does not host Mass, and is rarely open. The church is the site of various art exhibitions.
