= Giovan Battista della Cerva =

Italian painter

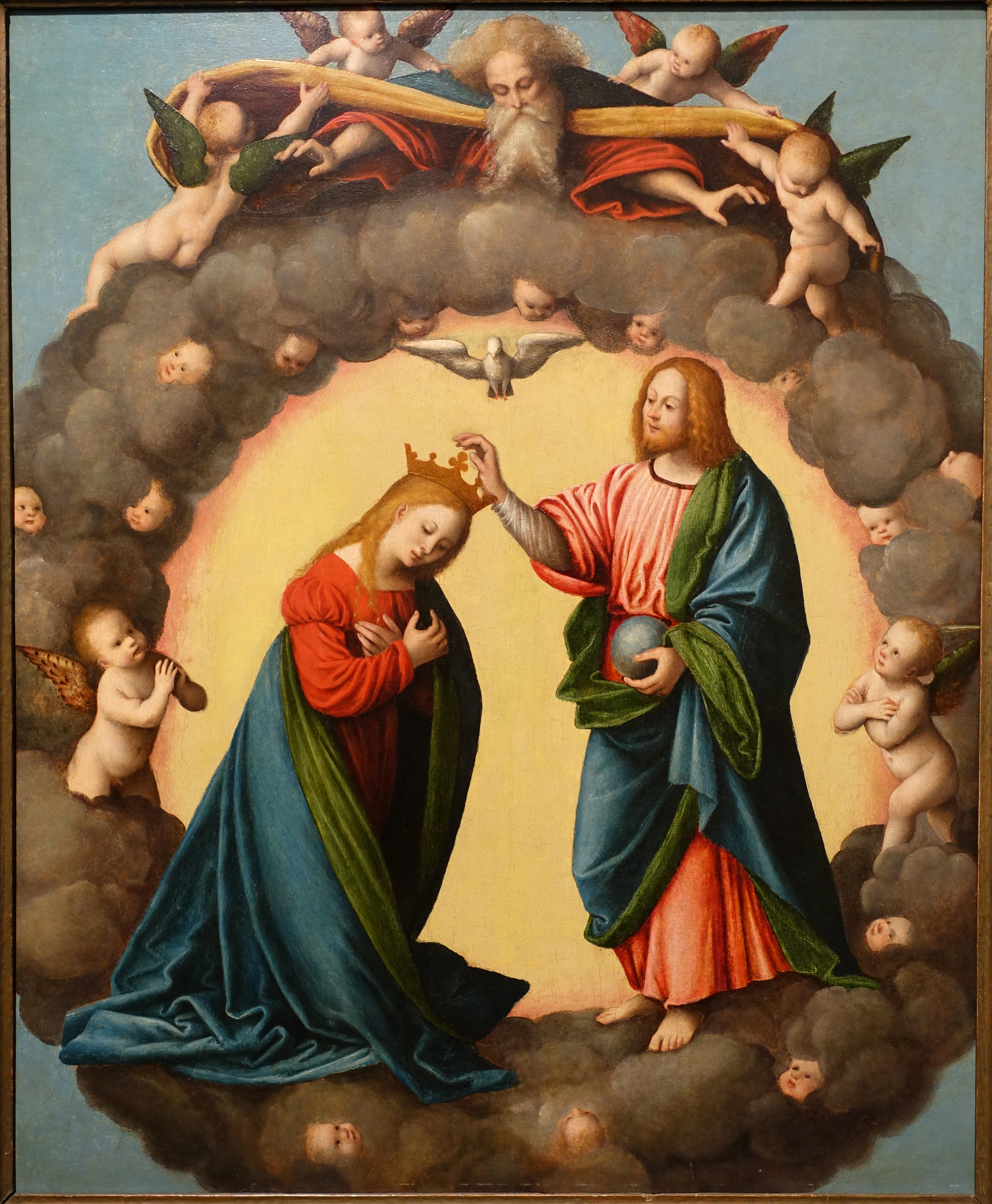
The Coronation of the Virgin, c. 1541

Giovan Battista della Cerva (c. 1515–1580) was an Italian painter.

Born in Novara, Italy, he was a pupil of Gaudenzio Ferrari, of whom he became the main assistant and collaborator during the last stage of his career. Works entirely by della Cerva include a Polyptych in Santa Maria di Piazza at Busto Arsizio, two altarpieces in San Nazaro in Brolo at Milan and the frescoes (together with Bernardino Lanino) in the St. Catherine chapel near the latter.

He was also the master of Gian Paolo Lomazzo. Della Cerva died in Milan in 1580.
