= Antonio da Lonate =

Italian architect

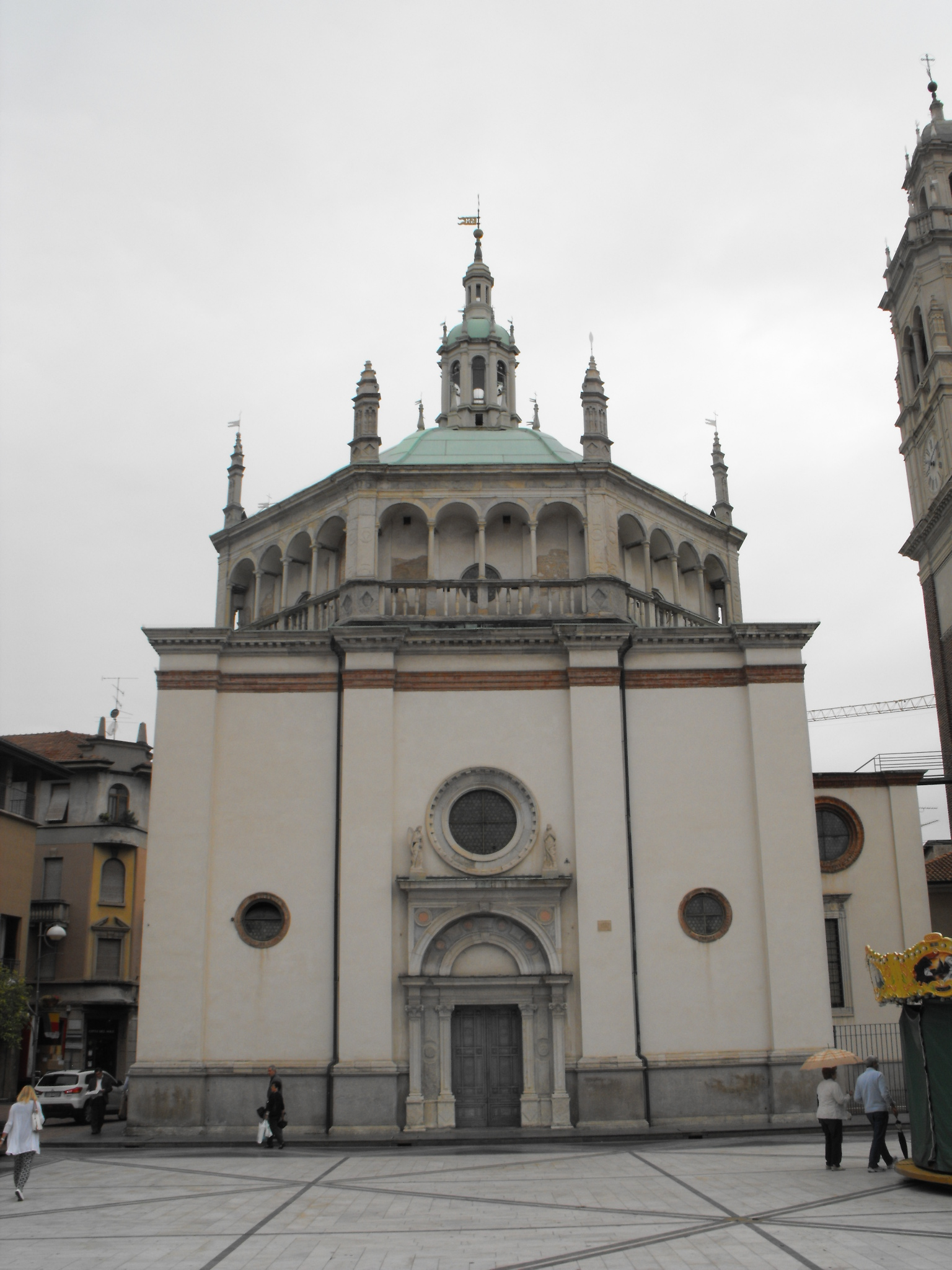
The church of Santa Maria di Piazza, designed by Da Lonate in c. 1517

Antonio da Lonate (born 1456–1457, Lonate Pozzolo - died after 1541, Milan) was an Italian architect who is known for his Renaissance architecture. A follower of Donato Bramante, his works were designed in the High Renaissance style. Among the works attributed to him are the altar at the Basilica of San Magno in Legnano, the Vigevano Cathedral, and the Sanctuary of Santa Maria di Piazza in Busto Arsizio.
