= Francesco Brambilla =

Italian sculptor

Francesco Brambilla (16th century) was an Italian sculptor of the Renaissance period, active in Milan, in the decoration of its massive gothic Cathedral.

His daughter, Margherita, was married to Pietro Antonio Daverio, one of his pupils.
