= Gian Andrea Biffi =

Italian sculptor (c.1560 –c.1631)

- Young Mary presented to the Temple, Royal Palace of Milan
- Born: c. 1581; Romagnano Sesia, Duchy of Milan
- Died: c. 1630; Milan, Duchy of Milan
- Known for: Painting
- Movement: Mannerism

Gian Andrea Biffi (c. 1581 – c. 1630) was an Italian Mannerist sculptor. He spent a large portion of his life decorating Milan Cathedral, where he also carried out a great variety of other works, such as sculptures and ornamentation in bronze for the throne, the high altar, and the tomb of Charles Borromeo, stone statues of the Prophets, marble low reliefs for the choir screen, and part of the façade above the front porch (the latter in collaboration with his son Carlo).

== Biography ==
Gian Andrea Biffi was born in Milan around 1581. His first documented works are an Abraham (1595) and David (1596) executed for Milan Cathedral; their dates cast doubt on the evidence for his date of birth.

Apart from some minor works for Santa Maria presso San Celso (1601, 1603) in Milan and for the Certosa di Pavia (1605), his activity was concentrated on Milan Cathedral, where his work is richly documented, although it is not always easy to identify. For the exterior he produced a series of documented statues of Joshua (1605), David and Moses (all 1606), Tobias and the Angel (both 1608). Between 1612 and 1629 he executed eight of the relief sculptures of the scenes from the Life of Christ together with figures of prophets for the external wall of the cathedral. In 1616 he was asked to provide 40 red wax models of angels for the altar of the Madonna dell’Albero, and from 1617 he worked on modelli for the ceiling of the crypt of San Carlo. Under the direction of Giovanni Battista Crespi, who provided the drawings (Milan, Museo del Duomo), he prepared modelli for trophies and for the scene of Esther and Ahasuerus for one of the cathedral portals (1629).

In 1621, Biffi's importance as a sculptor was officially recognized by his appointment as the first professor of sculpture in the Accademia Ambrosiana, which was founded that year. In 1626, he became chief sculptor (protostatuario) of the cathedral. His art was rooted in the traditions of late Mannerism, and he never entirely freed himself from the resulting academicism. He was reluctant to indulge in the drama of the new art of the Baroque and maintained a rigorous classicism and a sense of balance and symmetry that was only superficially affected by the stimuli of such painters as Crespi and Giulio Cesare Procaccini, with whom he was in contact on various occasions. Biffi died between 23 July 1630 and 8 February 1631; it is reasonable to assume that he was a victim of the 1629–1631 Italian plague. According to some sources, Biffi was the author of the marble statue of Philip II of Spain that stood beneath the tower of the Palazzo dei Giureconsulti and was torn down during the French occupation in 1799.

== Bibliography ==
- Bossaglia, Rossana (1968). "BIFFI, Gianandrea, il Vecchio". Dizionario Biografico degli Italiani (in Italian). Vol. 10: Biagio–Boccaccio. Rome: Institute of the Italian Encyclopaedia. ISBN 978-88-12-00032-6.
- (in German) Susanna Partsch: Biffi, Gian Andrea (1580). In: Allgemeines Künstlerlexikon. Die Bildenden Künstler aller Zeiten und Völker (AKL). Band 10, Saur, München u. a. 1994, ISBN 3-598-22750-7, S. 594 f.
- Bossaglia, Rossana (1973). Il Duomo di Milano. Vol. II. Milan: Amilcare Pizzi. pp. 109–18.
- Bossaglia, Rossana; Cinotti, Mia (1978). Tesoro e Museo del Duomo. Vol. 2. Milan: Electa. pp. 8, 13, 27–8.
- Anedi, Gabriella (1986). "Biffi, Gian Andrea". Il Duomo di Milano: Dizionario storico artistico e religioso. Milan: NED. ISBN 978-8870231137.
- Grigioni, G. (1987). "Biffi, Gianandrea". Dizionario della chiesa ambrosiana. Vol. 1. Milan: NED. ISBN 978-8870231137.
