= Antonio Azimonti =

Italian footballer (1925-1997)

Personal information
- Full name: Antonio Azimonti
- Date of birth: 2 January 1925
- Place of birth: Busto Arsizio, Italy
- Date of death: 10 August 1997 (aged 72)
- Position: Defender

Senior career*
Years	Team	Apps	(Gls)
1943–1951	Pro Patria		
1951–1952	Genoa	38	(3)
1952–1954	Roma	47	(1)
1954–1957	Udinese	72	(1)
1957–1958	Pro Patria	11	(0)
- * Club domestic league appearances and goals

Antonio Azimonti (or Azzimonti) (2 January 1925 – 10 August 1997) was an Italian footballer He was born in Busto Arsizio.

He played for 8 seasons (211 games, 1 goal) in the Serie A for Aurora Pro Patria 1919, A.S. Roma and Udinese Calcio.

His older brother Carlo Azimonti also played football professionally. To distinguish them, Carlo was referred to as Azimonti I and Antonio as Azimonti II.
