= Sanctuary of Santa Maria del Monte =

Sanctuary in Santa Maria del Monte, Frazione of Varese, Italy

Coordinates: 45.8603°N 8.7927°E

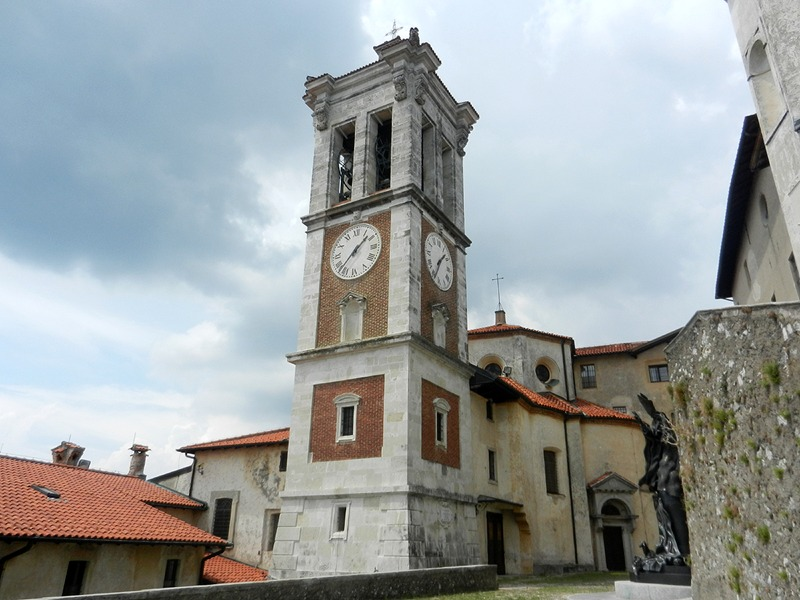
- The Sanctuary
- Sanctuary of Santa Maria del Monte
- Location: Varese, Lombardy
- Country: Italy
- Denomination: Roman Catholic

History
- Founded: 4th century
- Founder: Ambrose

Architecture
- Years built: 4th century (first church) 14/15th century (second church) 15th/16th century (current church)

Administration
- Diocese: Archdiocese of Milan

The Sanctuary of Santa Maria del Monte is a Roman Catholic Church located in Santa Maria del Monte, frazione of Varese, Italy. The church was founded in the 4th century and was rebuilt multiple times. In 2003 it became a UNESCO World heritage site.

== History ==
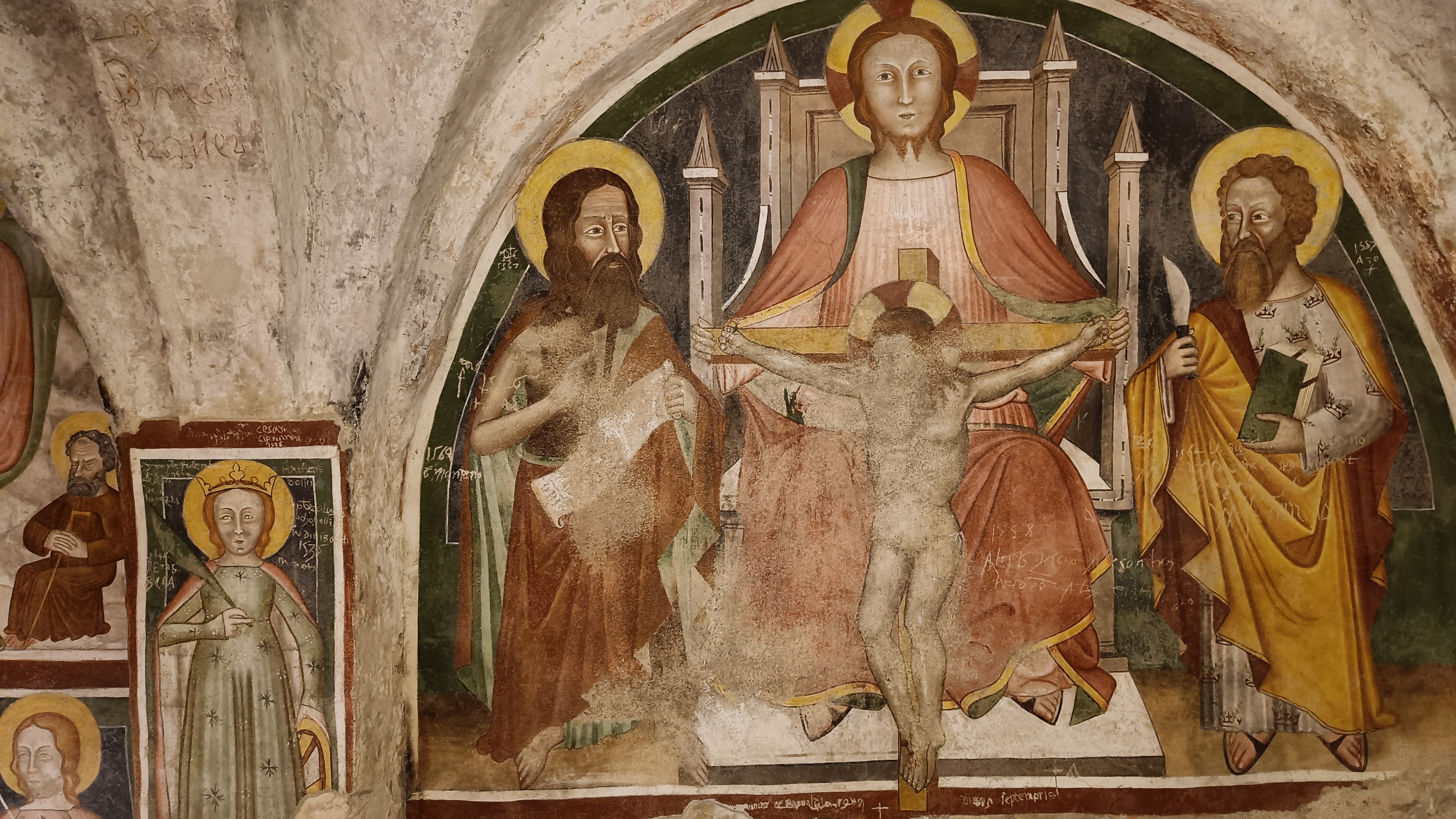
The Romanesque crypt.

The church was supposedly founded by Saint Ambrose in the 4th century following a victory against the Arians which supposedly occurred on the site of the current church. Various archeological finds, conducted in 2013, revealed the presence of a chapel dating back to the early 5th century. The church’s first mention dates back to 8 June 922, with a document discovered in the State Archives of Milan mentioning the church of ‘Santa Maria sopra Vellate’. There is no doubt that a sanctuary dating from the Carolingian-Ottonian period once stood here; its apsidal presbytery has survived to the present day and forms the current crypt, which is now adorned with late Gothic frescoes. During the Romanesque period, the building was expanded to the west and constructed above the pre-existing church in order to use its presbytery as a crypt, complete with a descending staircase. A village gradually grew up around the sanctuary, featuring houses for the priests and laypeople who worked there, as well as shelters for pilgrims. The 14th-century statue of the Madonna del Monte, a work of the Campione school, also dates from this period. Today it is draped in a precious robe, and has appeared this way since at least the 17th century, in accordance with a widespread custom. Beneath that drapery, however, lies a statue depicting Mary enthroned with the Infant Jesus. Following the construction of the new church, the sanctuary had become a popular site for pilgrims and needed to be rebuilt. In 1472, the Duke of Milan, Galeazzo Maria Sforza, ordered the church’s reconstruction, and tasked the architect Gerolamo Bartolomeo Gadio with redesigning the structure. A sculptural example of the Renaissance reconstruction is the entrance portal from the apse, featuring the so-called “Sforza Gate,” which bears the ducal coat of arms (the quartered serpent with the eagle) and the initials of Duke Francesco II (FR~º. IIº SFR~ª. DV~e. ME~. NI, Francesco II Sforza, Duke of Milan).

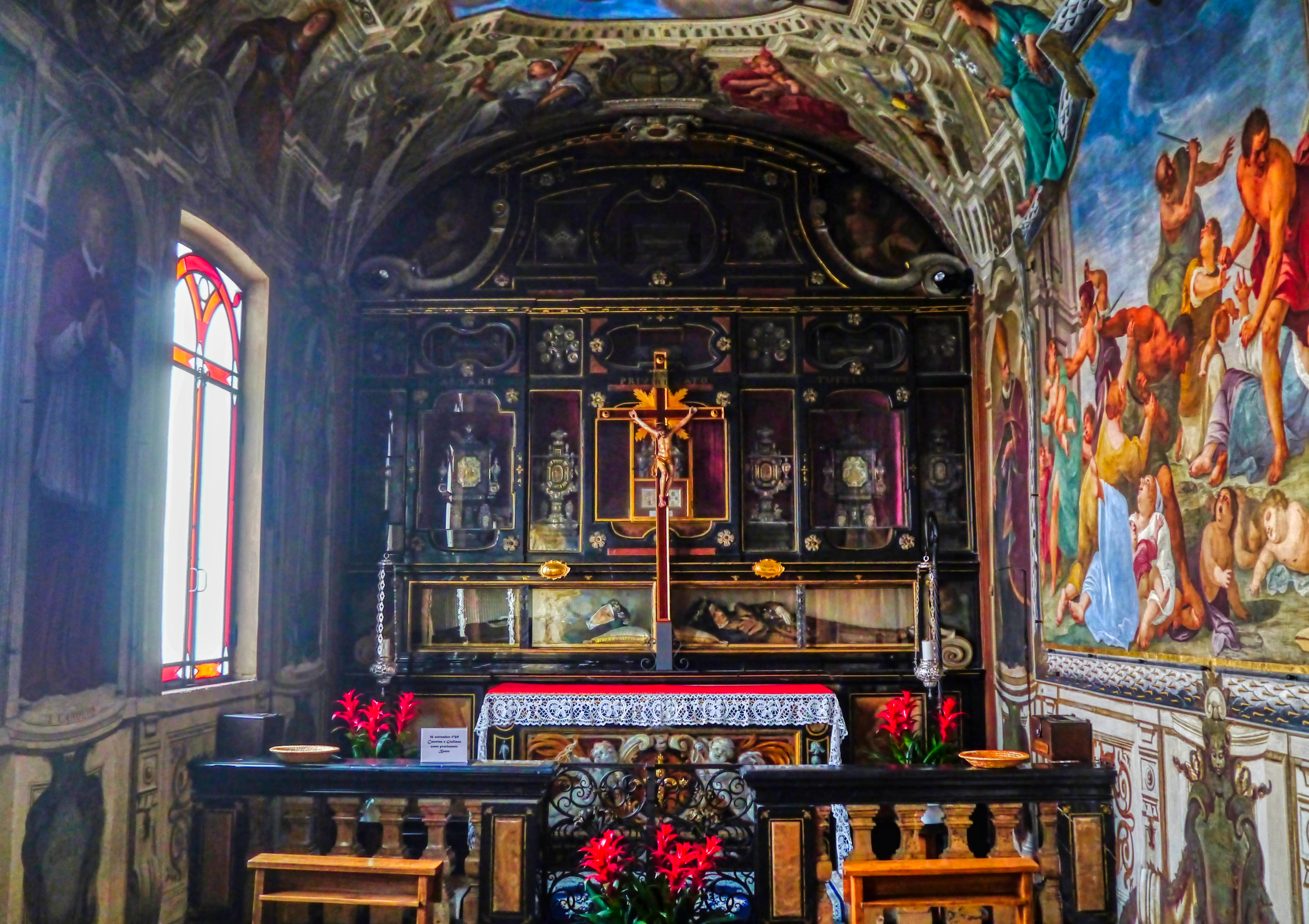
Chapel of the Blessed Caterina and Giuliana

Still in the second half of the 15th century, the Blessed Caterina Moriggi and Giuliana Puricelli, who later became the founders of the Order of the Ambrosian Hermits, retired to a hermitage adjacent to the sanctuary to lead a life of prayer; their example was followed by other young women. In 1474, Pope Sixtus IV granted the community permission to establish a monastery, and on August 10, 1476, the nuns opened the monastery, which still exists today. Shortly after the sanctuary’s reconstruction in the 15th century, there was a significant influx of artists from the Milanese area to create its decorative elements. Among these – representing the distinguished workshops of woodcarvers active in the Milanese area between the second half of the 15th and the first half of the 16th century – special mention must be made of the Master of Trognano, creator of the wooden panels that adorned the high altar, and Andrea da Milano, creator of the sculptural group depicting the Adoration of the Magi, which is still present in the sanctuary. Other works and liturgical furnishings, formerly belonging to the sanctuary, are preserved in the Sanctuary Museum, also known as the Baroffio Museum. The bell tower was constructed and designed by Giuseppe Bernascone between 1598 and 1600. Bernascone would later design the bell tower of the Basilica of San Vittore, Varese. Several chapels were added by nuns during the 16th century. At the beginning of the 17th century, the idea of a route that would provide easy access between the Varese plain and the sanctuary inspired the Capuchin friar Giovanni Battista Aguggiari, who enlisted the support of several noble families from Milan and extended the fundraising campaign to the communities of the faithful in numerous villages across a wide surrounding area. In 1604, the Fabbrica del Ss. Rosario was founded under the auspices of Cardinal Federico Borromeo and his delegate for the Sacro Monte, Archpriest Alessandro Mazenta, to oversee the construction and decoration of the chapels and the sanctuary, which were completed in 1698. The church still serves as the parish church of Santa Maria del Monte.

== Description ==
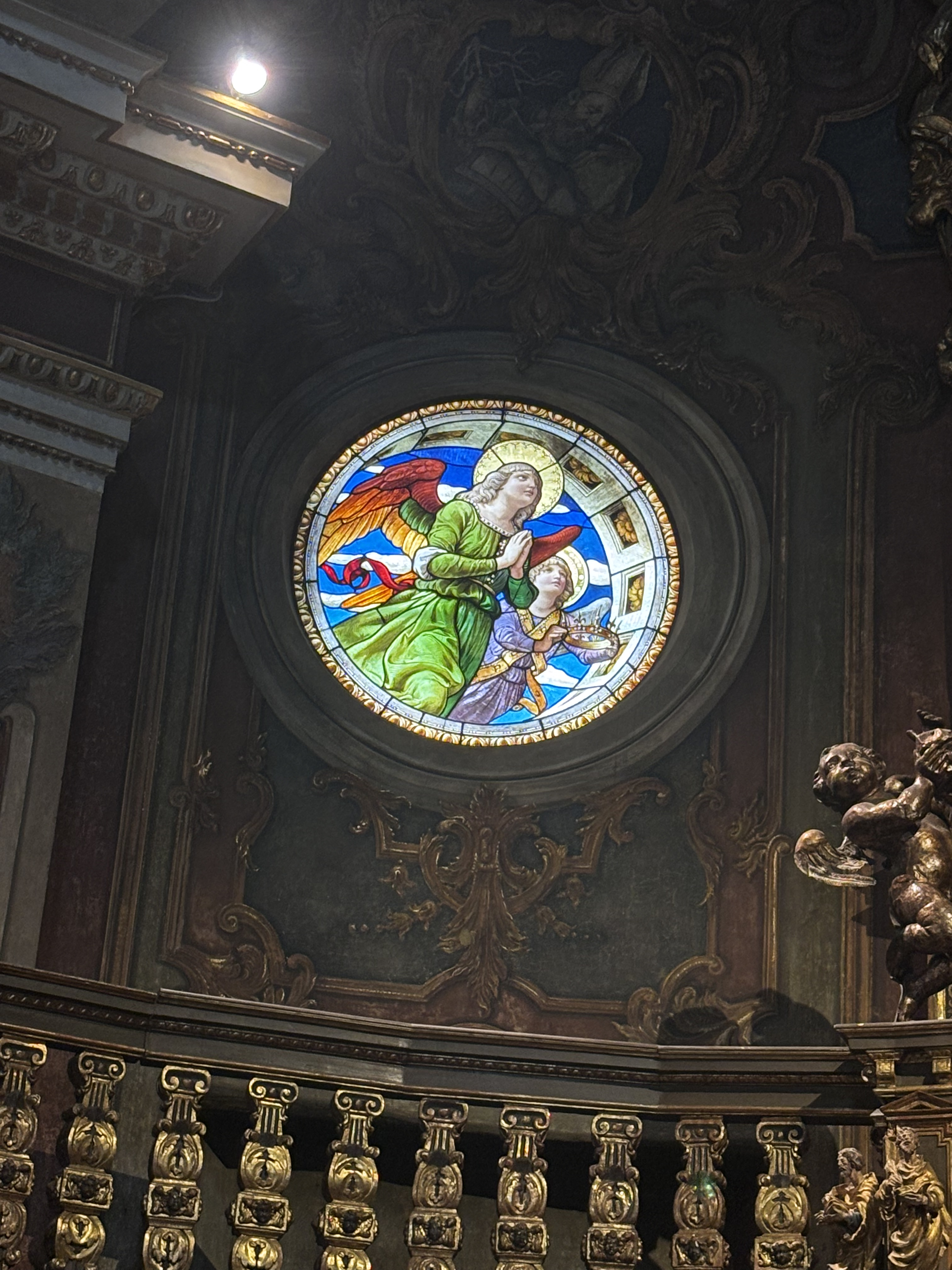
One of the stained glass windows

Of the original Renaissance decoration, a late 15th-century fresco by Vincenzo Civerchio da Crema, depicting Christ carrying the Cross amidst the Virgins, survives today; it can be seen halfway up the vault of the main nave, behind the grille from which the Romite nuns follow the services. Inside, the Renaissance architecture now appears in the Baroque style it was given in the 17th century. Artists who had also worked on other Sacri Monti were commissioned for the sanctuary, such as Giovanni Mauro della Rovere, known as il Fiammenghino (creator of the frescoes in the side aisles), and the Prestinari brothers (probably the creators of the wooden group depicting the ‘Presentation of Jesus in the Temple’). The central nave was decorated at the end of the 17th century by Salvatore Bianchi da Velate, who painted the Stories of Saint Ambrose on the walls and, on the vault, medallions depicting Esther and Ahasuerus, Judith and Holofernes, Jael and Sisera, and pairs of putti. The High Altar depicts the fifteenth mystery of the Rosary, the Coronation of the Virgin. It was created in 1662 with statues by Giuseppe Rusnati of Gallarate, thanks to the generosity of Count Giacomo Simonetta; the altar frontal, dating from 1894, is the work of Pogliaghi. The central dome is frescoed by Francesco Bianchi and Giuseppe Baroffio. In the left aisle stands the Baroque Chapel of Our Lady of Sorrows, commissioned by Abbot Martignoni (1681). On the altar, the altarpiece by Legnanino depicts ‘Christ blessed by the Virgin before Calvary’. Adjacent to the sanctuary is the oratory housing the remains of the Blessed Giuliana and Caterina, decorated with a complex cycle of frescoes by Antonio Busca. The sanctuary houses a neoclassical organ dating from 1831, the work of Luigi Maroni Biroldi, restored by Pietro Talamona in 1871 and by Vincenzo Mascioni in 1989.
