= Bernardino Castelli (sculptor) =

Italian sculptor (1646–1725)

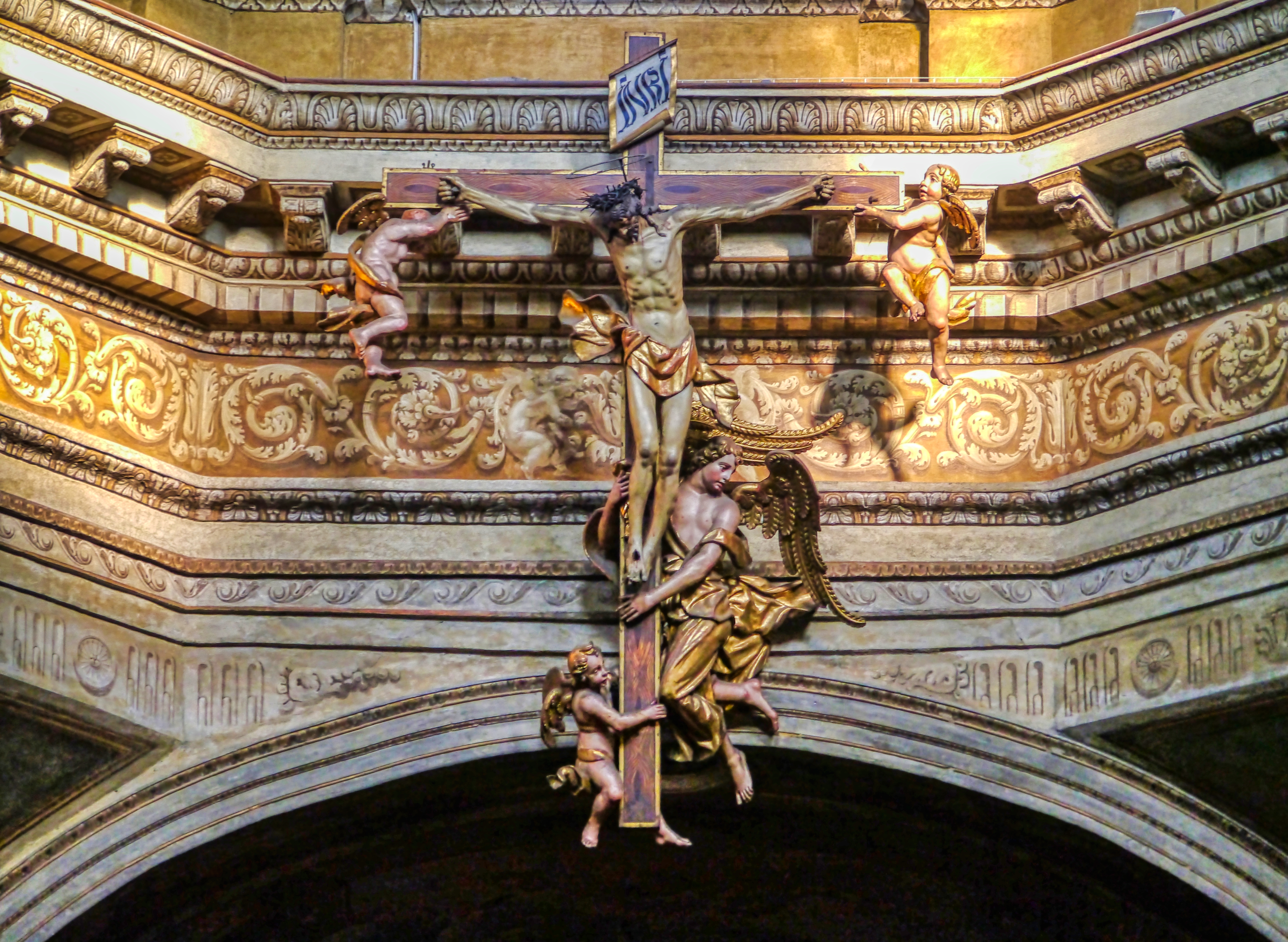
- The Crucifix of San Vittore by Castelli
- Born: 30 March 1646; Velate, Varese, Duchy of Milan
- Died: 22 May 1725 (aged 79); Varese, Duchy of Milan
- Known for: Sculpture
- Notable work: Basilica of San Vittore, Varese, Church of Sant'Antonio alla Motta, Sacro Monte di Varese

Bernardino Castelli (30 March 1646 – 22 May 1725) was an Italian woodworker, sculptor, and carver. He is best known for the pulpits of the Basilica of San Vittore, Varese.

== Biography ==
Bernardino Castelli was born on 30 March 1646 in Velate (then a comune, now a frazione of Varese), son of Bernardino and Laura Bianchi. He was named after his father who died on 18 March 1646, aged 24. Not much is known about his early life; Castelli probably worked in the construction of the Sacro Monte di Varese, thanks to his uncle, Don Antonio Castelli, Parish Priest of the Sacro Monte. During this period he met Antonio Pino da Bellagio, a Swiss sculptor who influenced Castelli's technique. He also was an apprentice of Paolo Glusiano (or Giussano) of Angera. He died in Varese on 22 May 1725, aged 79.

== Works ==
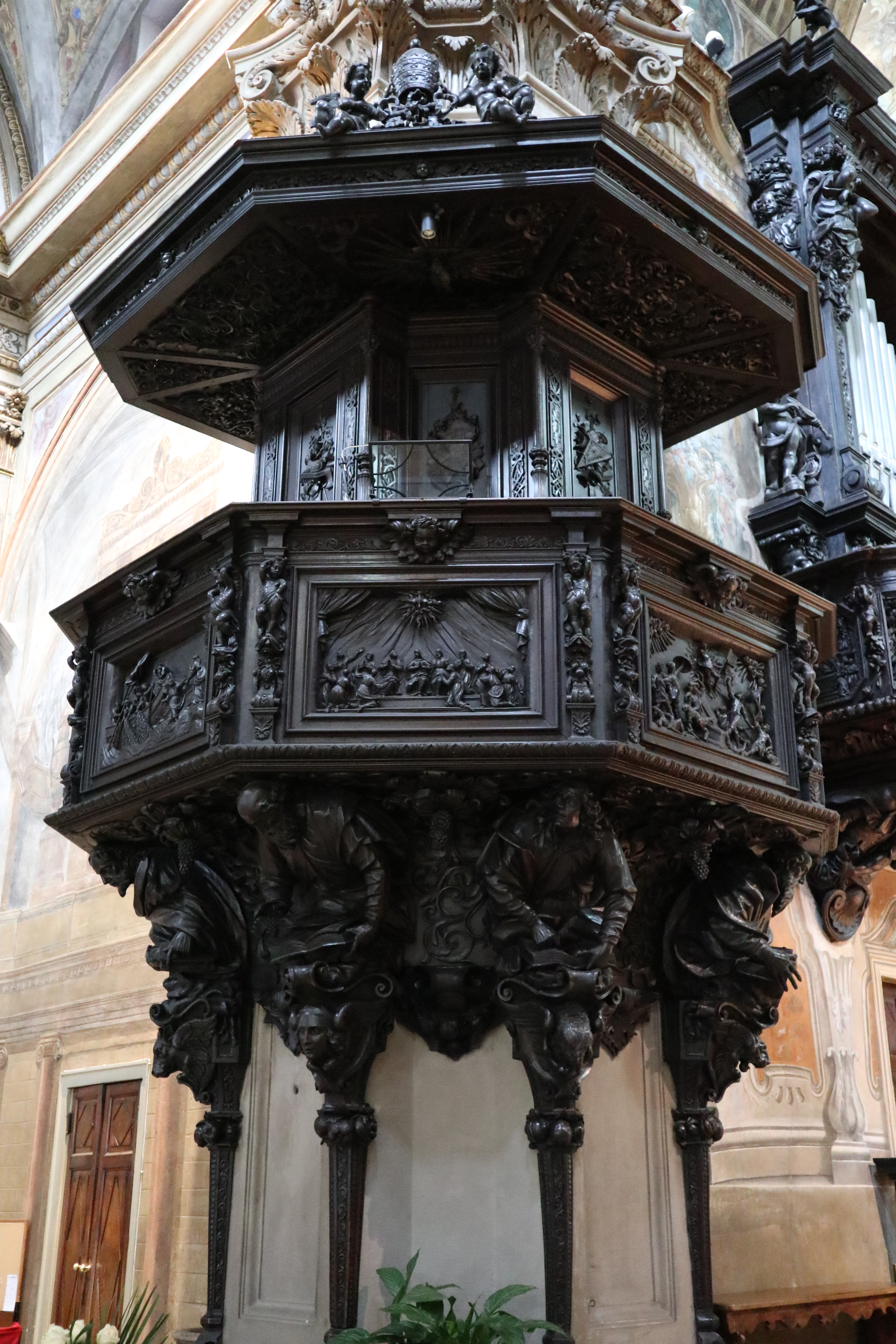
The pulpit of San Vittore

Castelli worked predominantly in churches and is known for his baroque style. Among his most important works are the pulpits of the Basilica of San Vittore in Varese, built between 1675 and 1690, the altar of that church (now housed in the church of San Giorgio in Biumo Superiore).Other notable works include the wooden altars of the churches of Caronno Varesino, sculpted in 1684, Daverio, sculpted in 1687, and Vergiate, sculpted in 1691. He also sculpted the crucifx for the church of Santo Stefano in Mezzana (1693), and the pulpits of the church of San Giulio in Cittiglio (1702), and the grand crucifix for the Basilica of San Vittore in Varese, which hangs from the base of the dome (1712).
