= Church of Sant'Antonio alla Motta =

Church in Varese, Italy

Coordinates: 45.8156°N 8.8249°E

Church of Sant’Antonio alla Motta
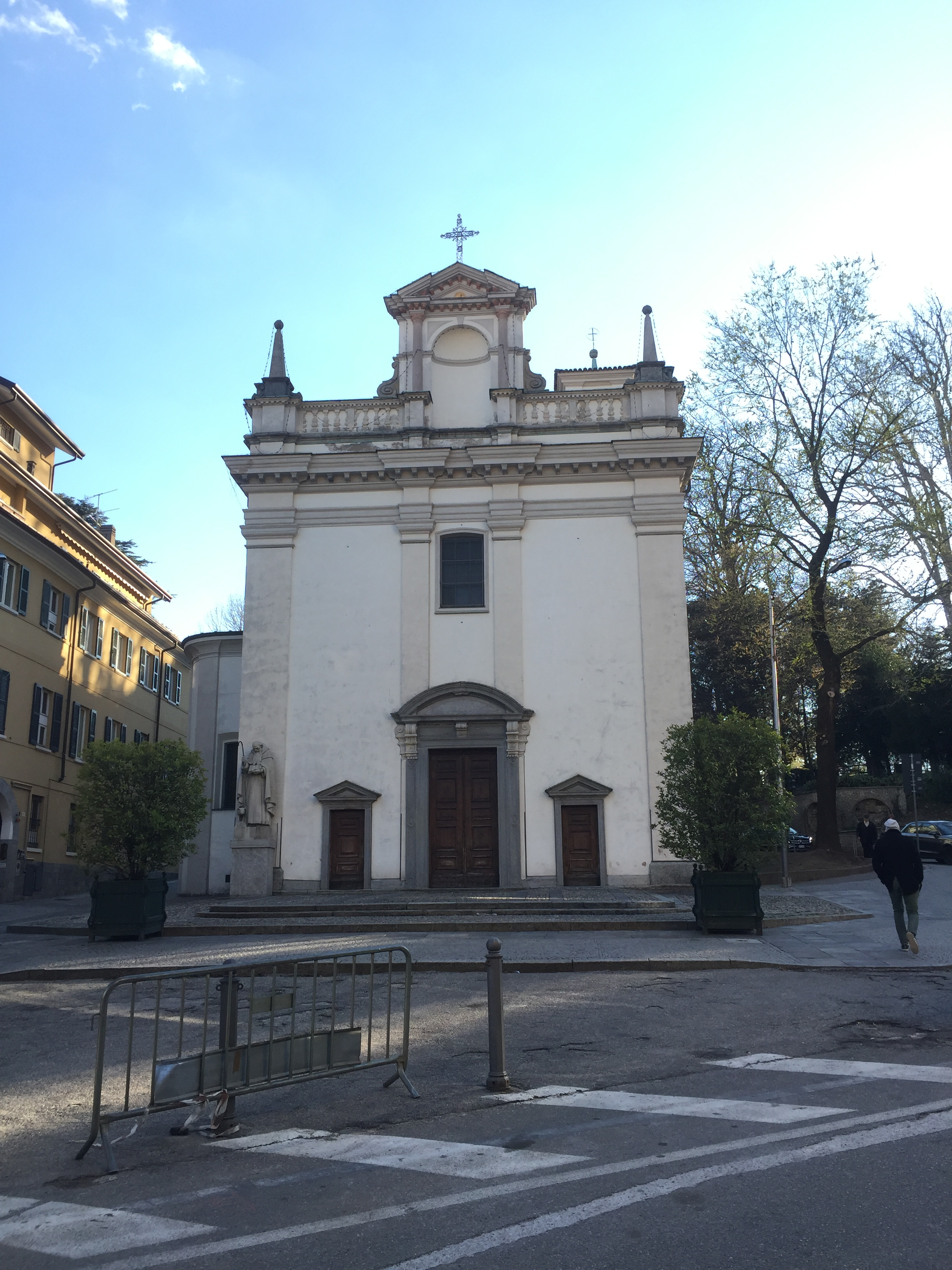
- The façade of the church
- Church of Sant’Antonio alla Motta
- Location: Varese
- Country: Italy
- Denomination: Roman Catholic

History
- Founded: 1000
- Dedication: Saint Anthony the Great

Architecture
- Architect: Giuseppe Bernascone
- Style: Baroque
- Years built: 1593–1619

Administration
- Diocese: Diocese of Milan
- Parish: Comunità Pastorale Sant'Antonio Abate

The Church of Sant’Antonio alla Motta is a Roman Catholic Church located in Piazza della Motta, in Varese, Italy. It is known for hosting the annual ‘Falò di Sant’Antonio’, which is held on the night of 16 January every year.

== History ==
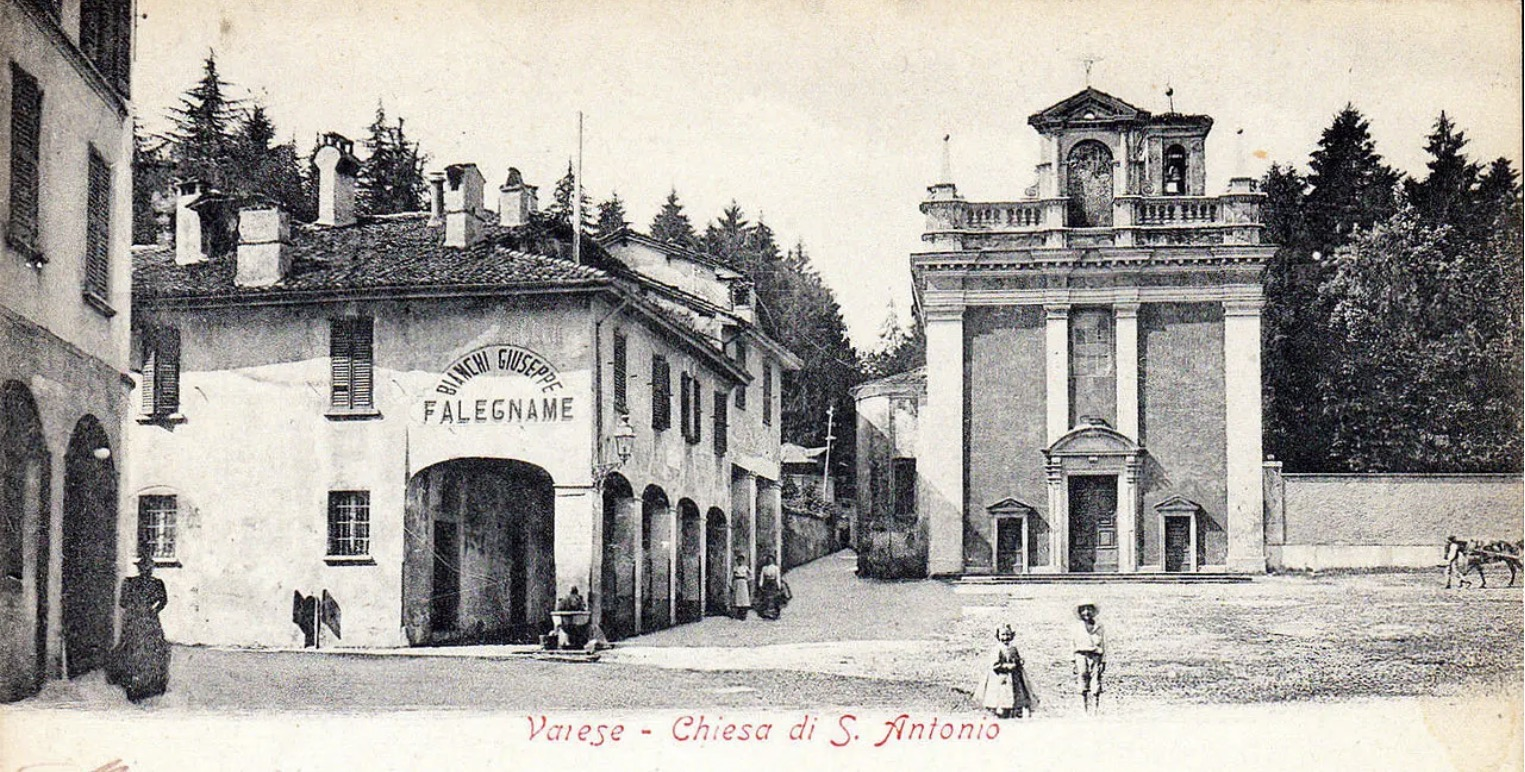
The church in 1900

The church was constructed in c. 1000, on land used as a market and as the tribunal for the seprio county, not far from Villa Mirabello. It was here that, during the medieval period, the Confraternita di Sant’Antonio was established. A chapel was then built.

In 1593, Giuseppe Bernascone, an architect from Varese who had recently been entrusted with the construction of the nearby Basilica of San Vittore, was called upon to design and build a new church dedicated to Sant’Antonio, demolishing the previous one. Remnants of the previous chapel can be seen today.

Construction began that same year, but due to the hilly terrain, the church could not be built facing east–west. Instead, Bernascone opted to construct it north–south. Due to the terrain, the flooring is slightly inclined from the apse to the portal. Construction of the dome began in 1606, and of the bell tower in 1619. Various sculptures and interior features were added in 1604 by Marco Antonio Bernasconi and the sculptor Sessa of Velate. The church is shaped like the letter ‘T’.

== Architecture ==
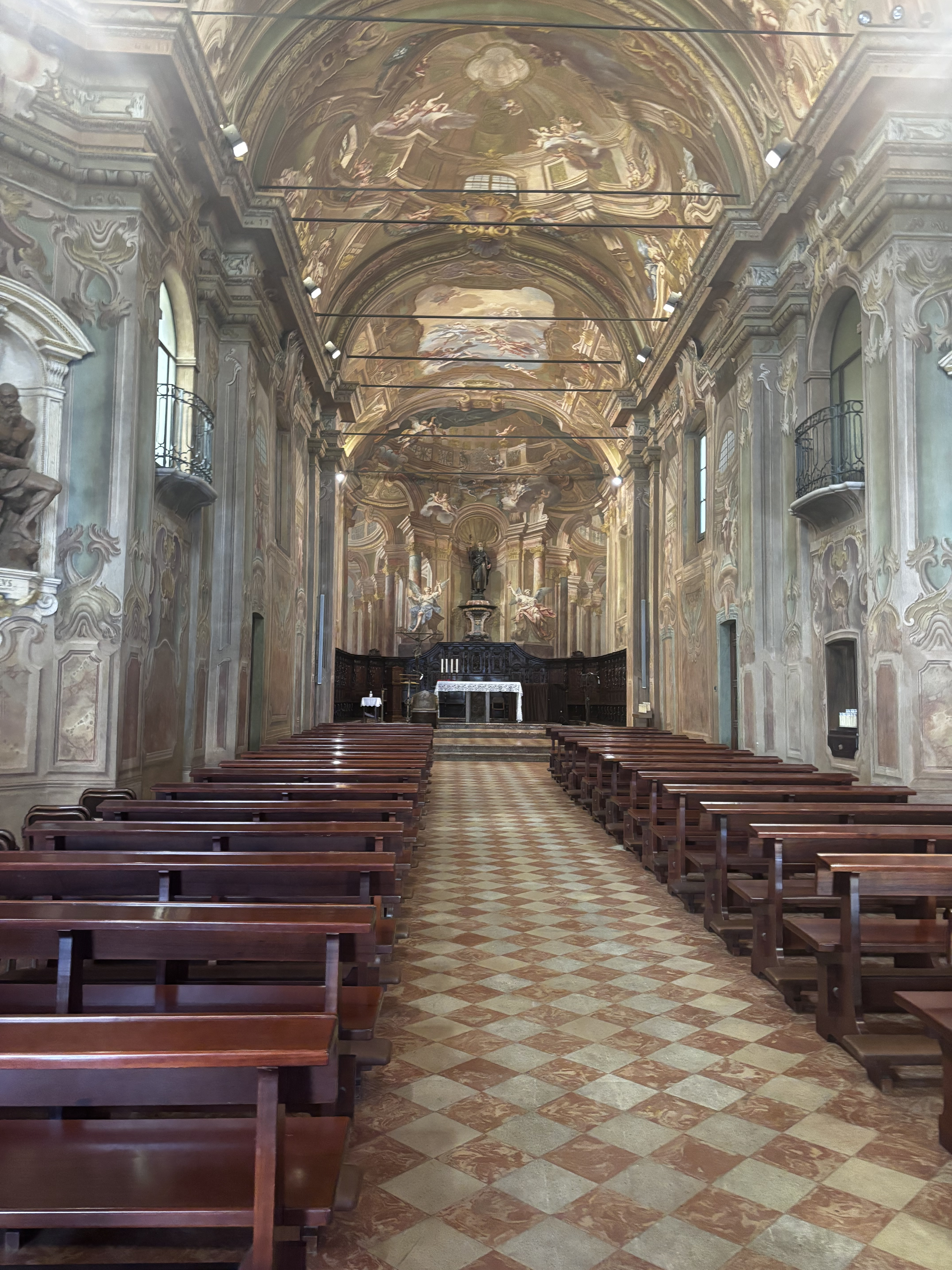
The church’s interior

The majority of the frescos of the church were painted by Giuseppe Baroffio, painted in a baroque style. Baroffio used the trompe-l’œil effect to provide depth in his frescos. Baroffio, though, was not seen as an important artist, and thus the church originally called upon Pietro Antonio Magatti to paint the interior. But due to illness, Magatti refused. Baroffio began to execute his work in 1750, and concluded in 1756. He was helped by Giovanni Battista Ronchelli, apprentice of Magatti and a member of the Confraternita di Sant’Antonio, who maintained Barrofio's technique while painting the frescos. Various other sculptures were made by Bernardino Castelli. Four sculptures of San Paolo, San Macario, Sant’Illario, and Sant’Onofrio were erected between 1613 and 1623, and sculpted by Francesco Selva and Dionigi Bussola.

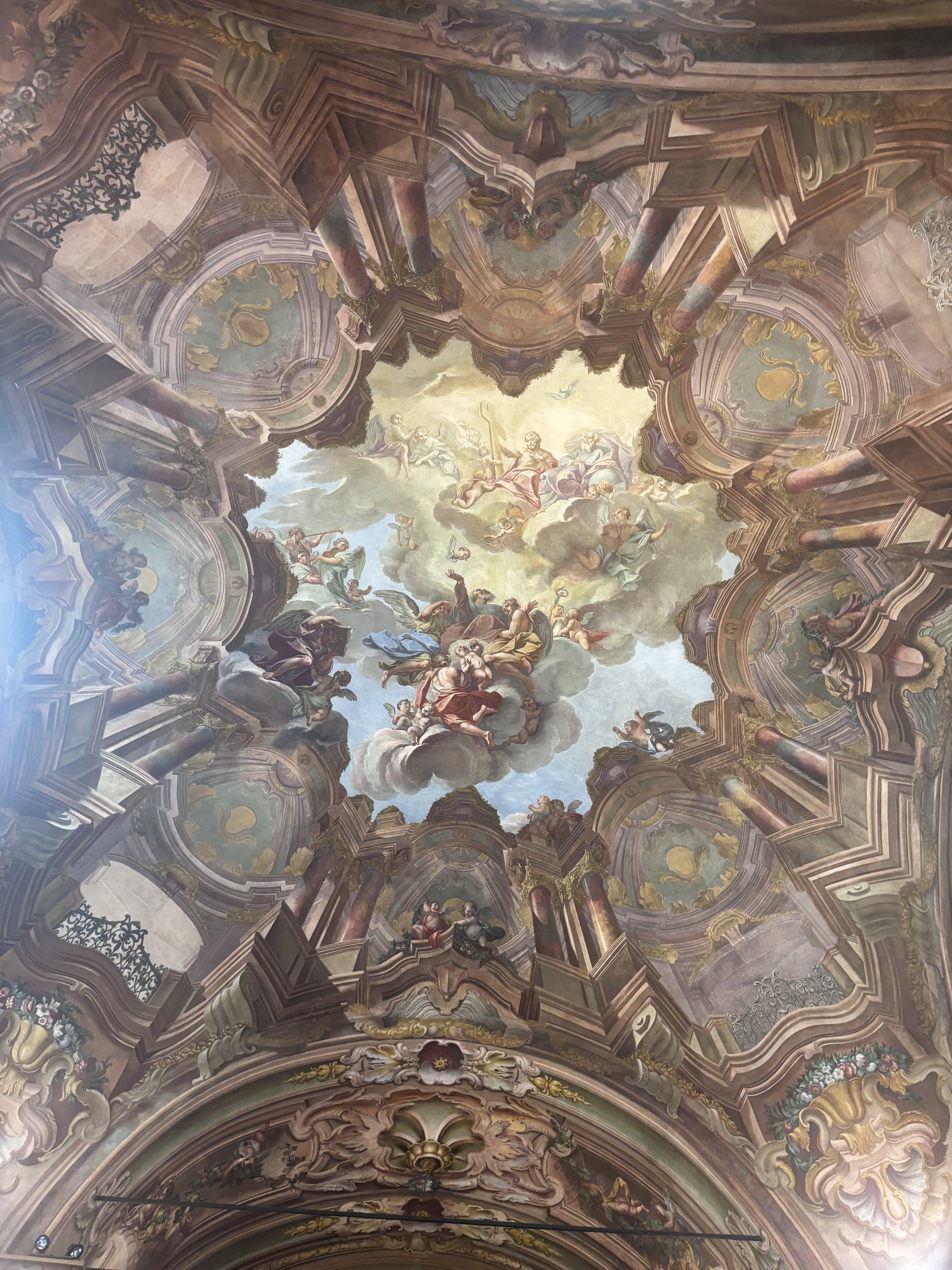
The frescos on the dome

The church was completely restored in 2007, with its restoration concluding in 2008.

== Falò di Sant'Antonio ==
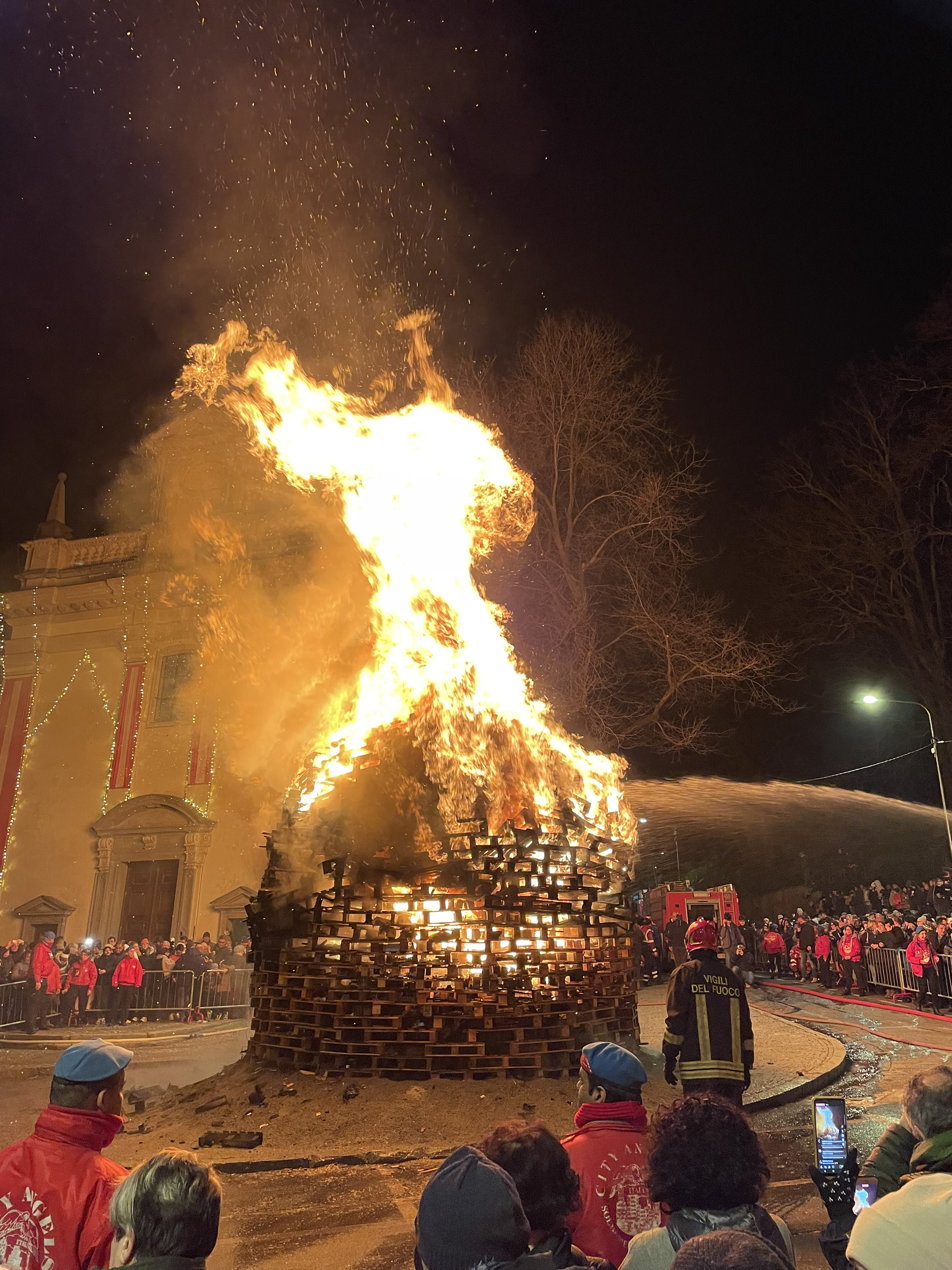
The 2024 Falò

The church is known for hosting the popular ‘Falò di Sant’Antonio’ every year on 16 January. The falò has been documented since 1572 and has always been held in Piazza della Motta, in front of the church. It has never been interrupted, and has run continuously for over 450 years, even during the COVID-19 pandemic and the 1629-1631 Italian plague. The event is organised by the ‘Monelli della Motta’.
