= Vellone–Sacro Monte funicular =

Funicular railway Lombardy, Italy

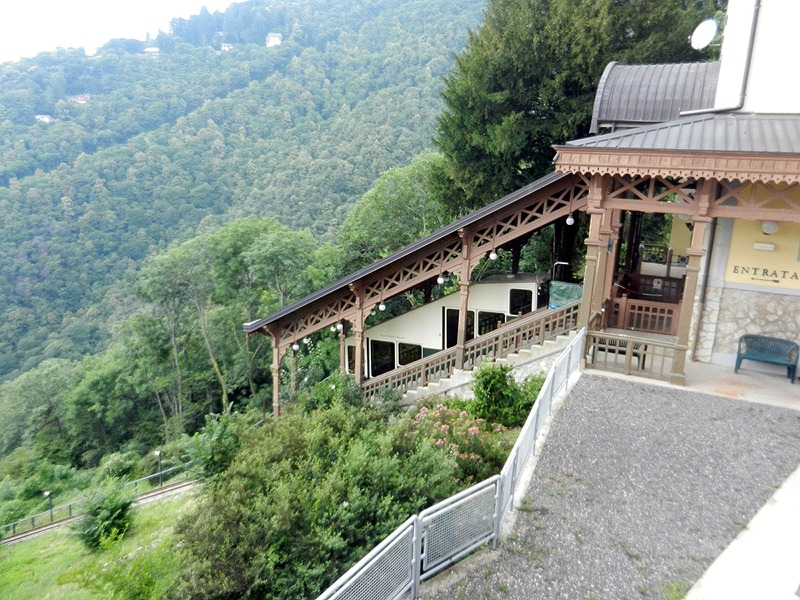
- Summit station

Overview
- Status: Open
- Locale: Varese, Lombardy, Italy
- Coordinates: 45.860361°N 8.793222°E

Service
- Type: Funicular
- Operator(s): Azienda Varesina Trasporti

History
- Opened: 1909

Technical
- Line length: 371 m (1,217 ft)
- Track gauge: 1,000 mm (3 ft 3 3/8 in)
- Maximum incline: 56.5%

The Vellone–Sacro Monte funicular (Italian: Funicolare Vellone-Sacro Monte) is a funicular railway in the town of Varese in the Italian region of Lombardy. It connects the valley of the Vellone river with the village and sanctuary of Sacro Monte di Varese.

The line first opened in May 1909, and remained in service until August 1953. Service was first reinstated in July 2000, before being suspended in 2003 and reinstated in 2005. It shared its lower station with the Vellone–Campo dei Fiori funicular until both lines closed in 1953. The Campo dei Fiori line never reopened.

The funicular is operated by the Azienda Varesina Trasporti, and has the following technical parameters:

Configuration	single track with passing loop
Length	371 m (1,217 ft)
Height	168 m (551 ft)
Maximum steepness	56.5%
Track gauge	1,000 mm (3 ft 3 3/8 in)
Number of cars	2
Capacity	55 passengers per car
Trip time	3 minutes

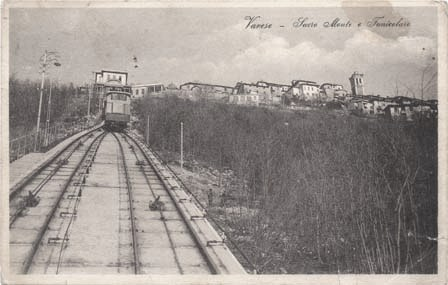
Varese - Sacro Monte funicular circa 1930

== See also ==
- List of funicular railways
