= Caterina Moriggi =

Italian nun

Blessed Caterina Moriggi
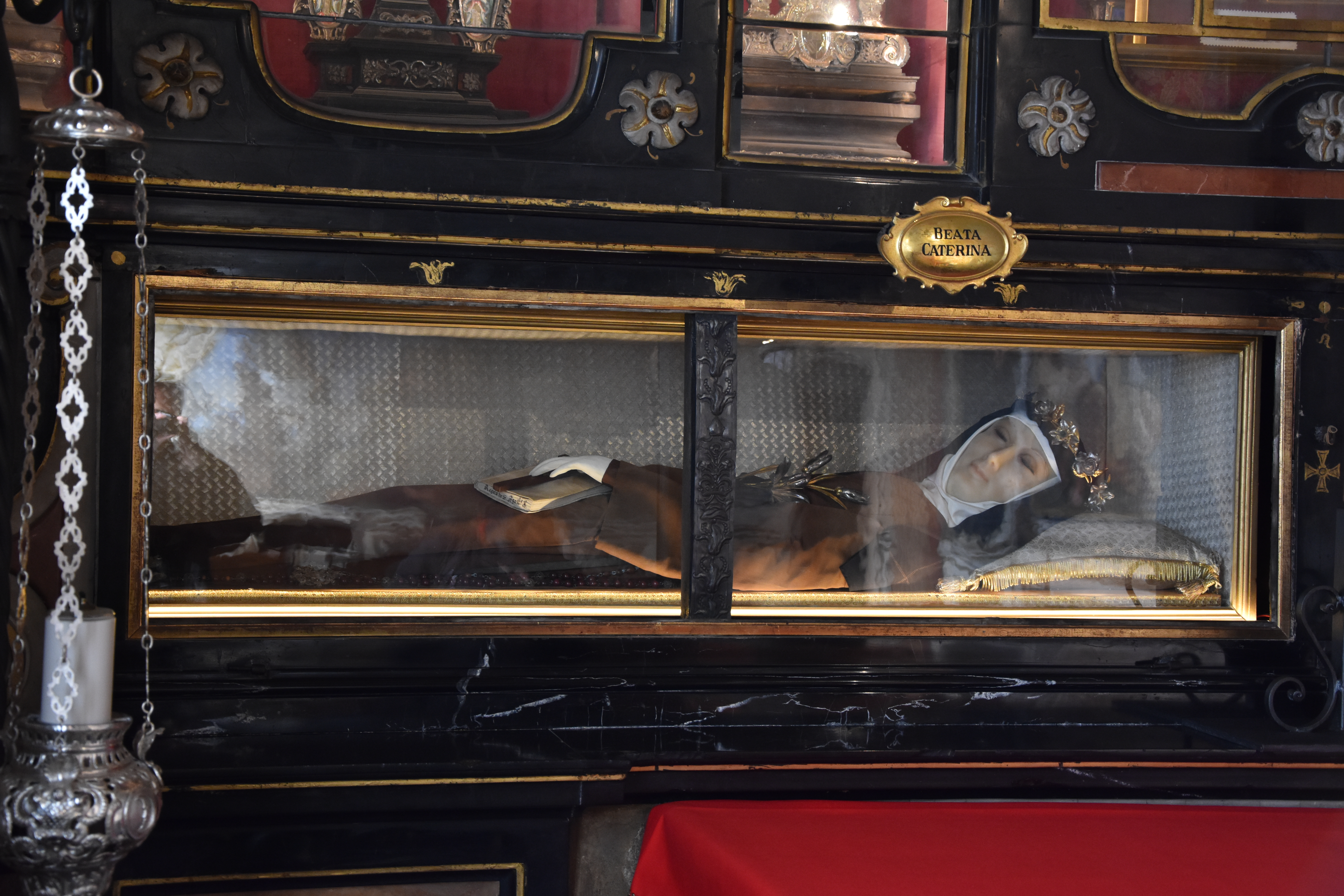
- Reliquary of Cateria Moriggi in Santa Maria del Monte

Virgin
- Born: c. 1437; Pallanza, Duchy of Milan
- Died: 6 April 1478 (aged 51); Convent of Sacro Monte, Varese, Duchy of Milan
- Venerated in: Roman Catholic Church
- Beatified: 16 September 1769, Saint Peter's Basilica by Pope Clement XIV
- Feast: 6 April; 27 April (Ambrosian Rite)

Caterina Moriggi (1437 - 6 April 1478) was an Italian Roman Catholic who became a professed religious and adhered to the teachings and traditions of Augustine of Hippo. She lived in contemplation in the Italian mountains before establishing a new order, dubbed Order of Saint Ambrose ad Nemus which followed the Augustinian rule. Moriggi became known as Catherine of Pallanza when she became a religious and was noted for her austere model of living and for her deep personal holiness.

Moriggi was beatified on 16 September 1769 after Pope Clement XIV recognized her long-standing cult in the northern Italian cities. Moriggi is also commemorated in the Ambrosian Rite that is celebrated in north Italian dioceses.

== Life ==
Caterina Moriggi was born around 1437 in Pallanza; her parents and siblings all perished of the plague when she was a child. As a result, a woman from Milan adopted her as her own.

At the age of fourteen she felt called to devote herself to the service of God; her willingness to live the life of an ascetic came from the well-known preacher and Franciscan Alberto de Sarteano. At the age of 20 she was emotionally moved after hearing a sermon on the Passion of Christ, prostrated herself before the Cross in the church and consecrated her virginity to God. It was not long after this that she had a vision of the crucified Jesus Christ who said to her: "Beloved daughter Catherine ... I have selected for you the place called Saint Mary on the Mountain".

Acting on this, she lived - for a period of fifteen years starting in 1450 - with a group of fellow women as hermits in the mountains near Varese under the guidance of the archpriest of the Marian shrine near their location. Moriggi read each day the account from the Gospel of John on the Passion of Christ. She was noted for her personal holiness as well as for the austere model of which she led her life and was known to survive on the irregular gifts of food that spiritual students of hers brought to her. She recited a thousand Hail Mary prayers each Saturday. She attracted dozens of would-be students that she agreed to lead a group of five under the Augustinian rule - this also included Giuliana Puricelli.

In 1473 the Duke of Milan - Galeazzo Maria Sforza requested, on her behalf, permission of Pope Sixtus IV for approval of Moriggi's following. The pontiff approved the small group in a papal bull on 10 November 1474. The territorial limits of their hermitage were established on 28 September 1475 and approval was also granted for their members to wear the black veil; the members made their solemn vows and received the habit on 10 August 1476. Moriggi was made the first Abbess of the group and held the position until her death.

Moriggi died on 6 April 1478 in a convent in Varese. On her deathbed she was given a crucifix and she kissed it and said: "I see my beloved Crucified One". Her confessor then said to her: "Behold your Crucified One" and she replied: "I have Him engraved on my heart". Her relics were transferred in 1730 into a chapel that was built in her honour.

== Beatification ==
On Pentecost in 1729 the Bishop of Bobbio Giorgio Barni - in the name of the Cardinal Archbishop of Milan Benedetto Erba Odescalchi - confirmed the cult of Moriggi in Milan and the surrounding cities. On 12 September 1769 the Congregation of Rites approved the cultus and passed it to the pope for his approval.

On 16 September 1769 she was beatified after Pope Clement XIV recognized her cultus.
