= Giuliana Puricelli =

Italian nun

Blessed Giuliana Puricelli O.S.A.
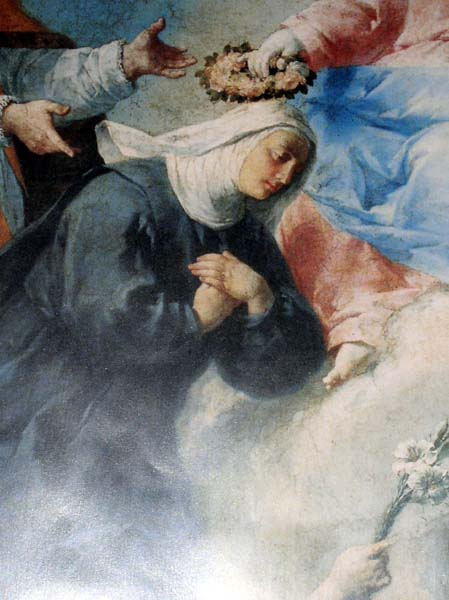

Religious
- Born: 1427; Busto Arsizio, Varese, Duchy of Milan
- Died: 15 August 1501 (aged 74); Convent of Sacro Monte, Varese, Duchy of Milan
- Venerated in: Roman Catholic Church
- Beatified: 16 September 1769, Saint Peter's Basilica, Rome, Papal States by Pope Clement XIV
- Feast: 27 April (Milan); 23 October (former); 14 August
- Attributes: Religious habit

Giuliana Puricelli (1427 - 15 August 1501) was an Italian Roman Catholic professed religious from the Order of Saint Augustine. Puricelli left her home after her father wanted to have her married and so fled to a hermitage where she placed herself under the spiritual direction of Caterina Moriggi. The two became close friends and their hermitage grew over the following decades. Her reputation was noted throughout the area for her contemplation and penitential practices as well as for her desire to live a cloistered life meditating on God.

The devotion to Puricelli led to her beatification on 16 September 1769 after Pope Clement XIV confirmed her local cultus (or longstanding veneration).

== Life ==
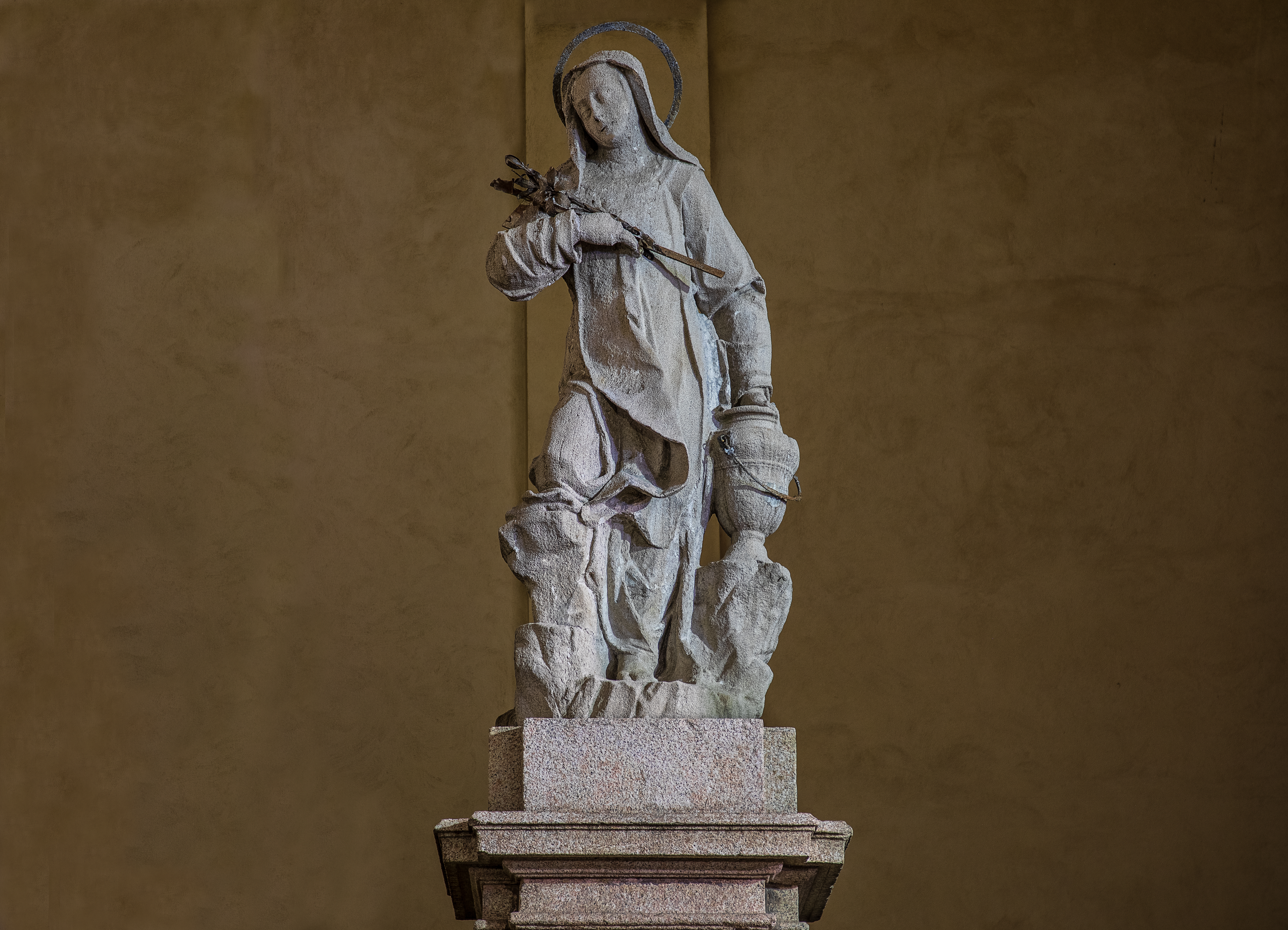
Statue of Beata Giuliana

Giuliana Puricelli was born in Busto Arsizio in 1427 to peasants. Her father was a crude and violent man who detested the fact that his daughter was attracted to the spiritual life and so made plans to have her married. To that end she fled her home in secret on 14 October 1454 and encountered Caterina Moriggi at her hermitage.

Puricelli became close friends with Moriggi (who served as her spiritual director when she entered the hermitage) over time and the two grew their hermitage to attract additional members. Pope Sixtus IV granted her permission on 10 August 1476 to live the monastic life and she assumed the religious habit following this. Puricelli became noted for her strength of spirit and her patience in addition to her assiduous contemplation of God. The nun - who was illiterate - often fetched fresh water for pilgrims who visited the hermitage.

Puricelli died at the convent on 15 August 1501 after having served as its abbess since Moriggi's death in 1478. Her remains were relocated on 23 October 1650 and moved again near those of Moriggi in 1729.

== Beatification ==
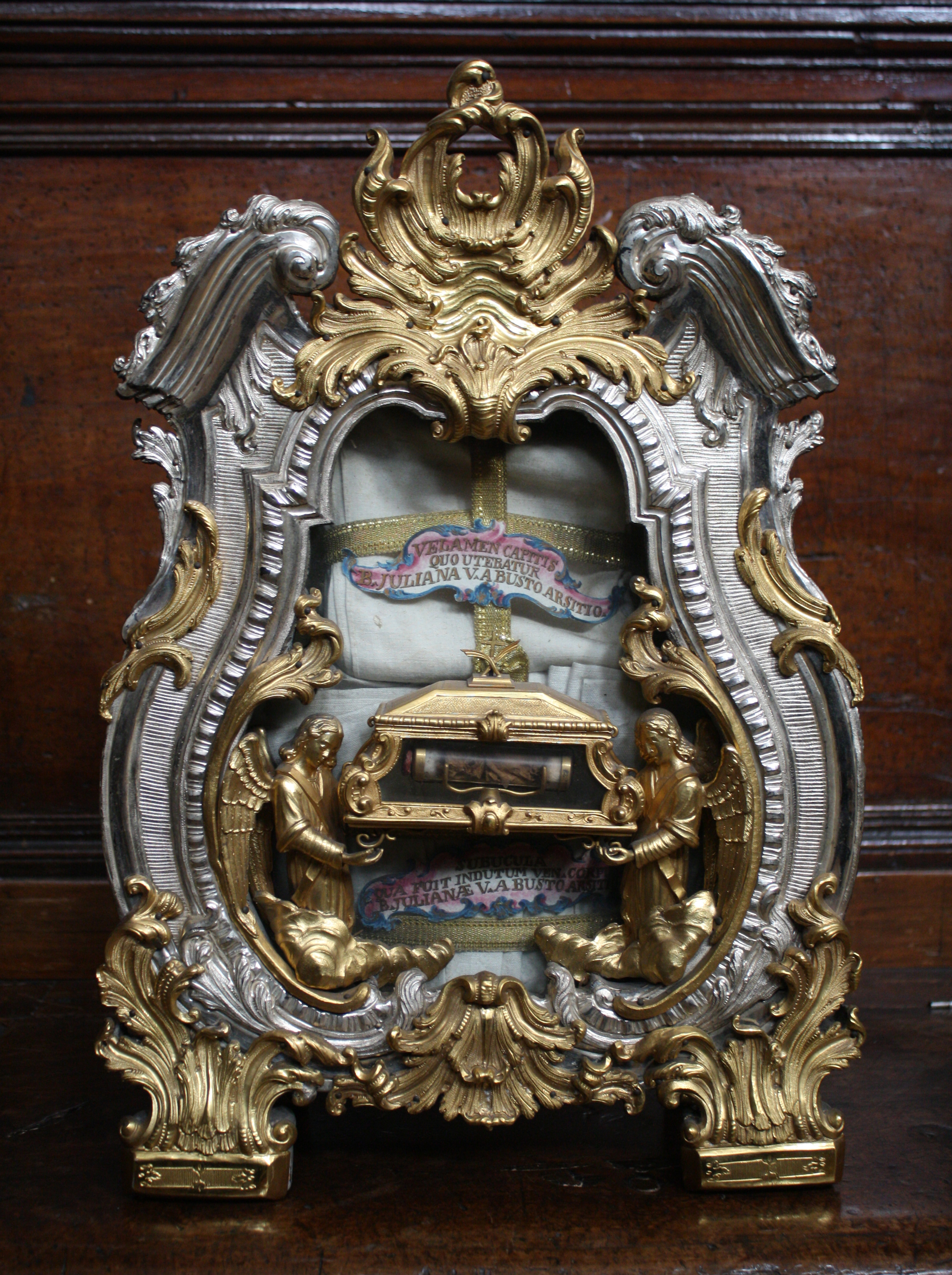
Relic of Beata Giuliana in the Basilica of St. John the Baptist, Busto Arsizio

Both Puricelli and Moriggi were beatified on 16 September 1769 after Pope Clement XIV confirmed their local cultus (or longstanding veneration).
