= Cristoforo Prestinari =

Italian artist

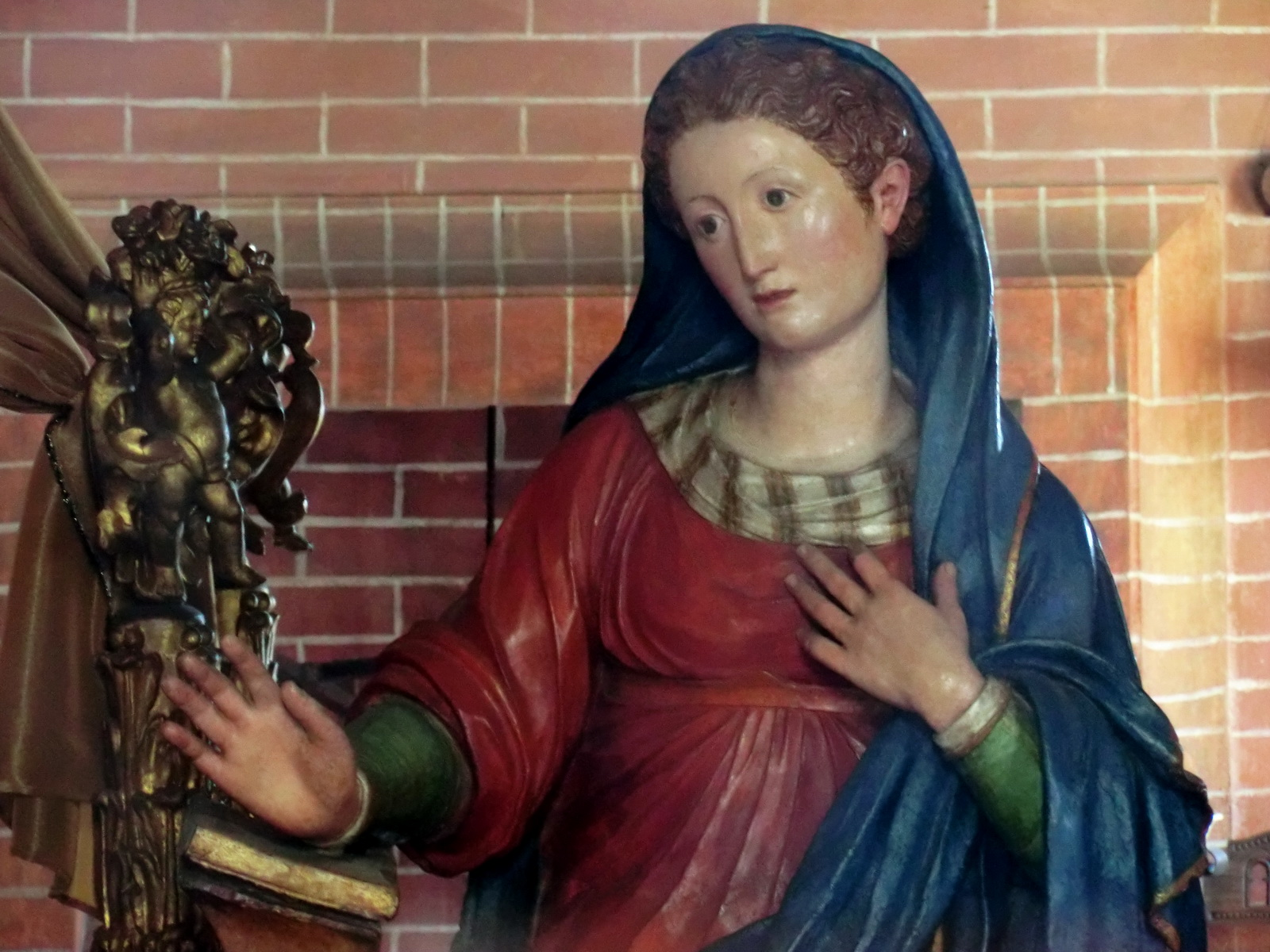
The Holy Mary by Prestinari

Cristoforo Prestinari (Claino, c. 1570 - Milan, 1623) was an Italian artist of the Baroque period who worked mainly in the field of sculpture, brother of the artist Marco Antonio Prestinari. Trained in the workshop that his father Michele kept open in Val d'Intelvi, he later reached Milan, where he became appreciated, so much so that the Fabbrica del Duomo assigned him important works.

== Sacro Monte work ==
Prestinari's work is mainly concentrated within the Piedmont and Lombard circuit of the Sacri Monti, where numerous testimonies attributed to him are preserved: examples are the 26 statues that adorn chapel III of the Sacro Monte di Varese, or the statues depicting the archangel Gabriel and Maria present in the chapel of the annunciation, sculpted by the author on commission from the municipality of Orta and donated in 1610 to the Mount.

Prestinari was not chosen by chance by the Orta community; in fact, notable on the part of the artist had been his contribution to the creation of the statuary installation of numerous chapels at Sacro Monte di Orta from 1600 onward.

The scenic installations left at Sacro Monte di Orta by the Prestinari differ from those of his successor at the Monte factory, Dionigi Bussola, because unlike the latter's dynamic and vibrant works, those of Prestinari appear symmetrical and orderly. Chapel XII still preserves the "audition" made by the artist who, upon arriving at the Mount, made a group of statues to submit to the patron to demonstrate his skill.
