= Giuseppe Bernascone =

Italian architect

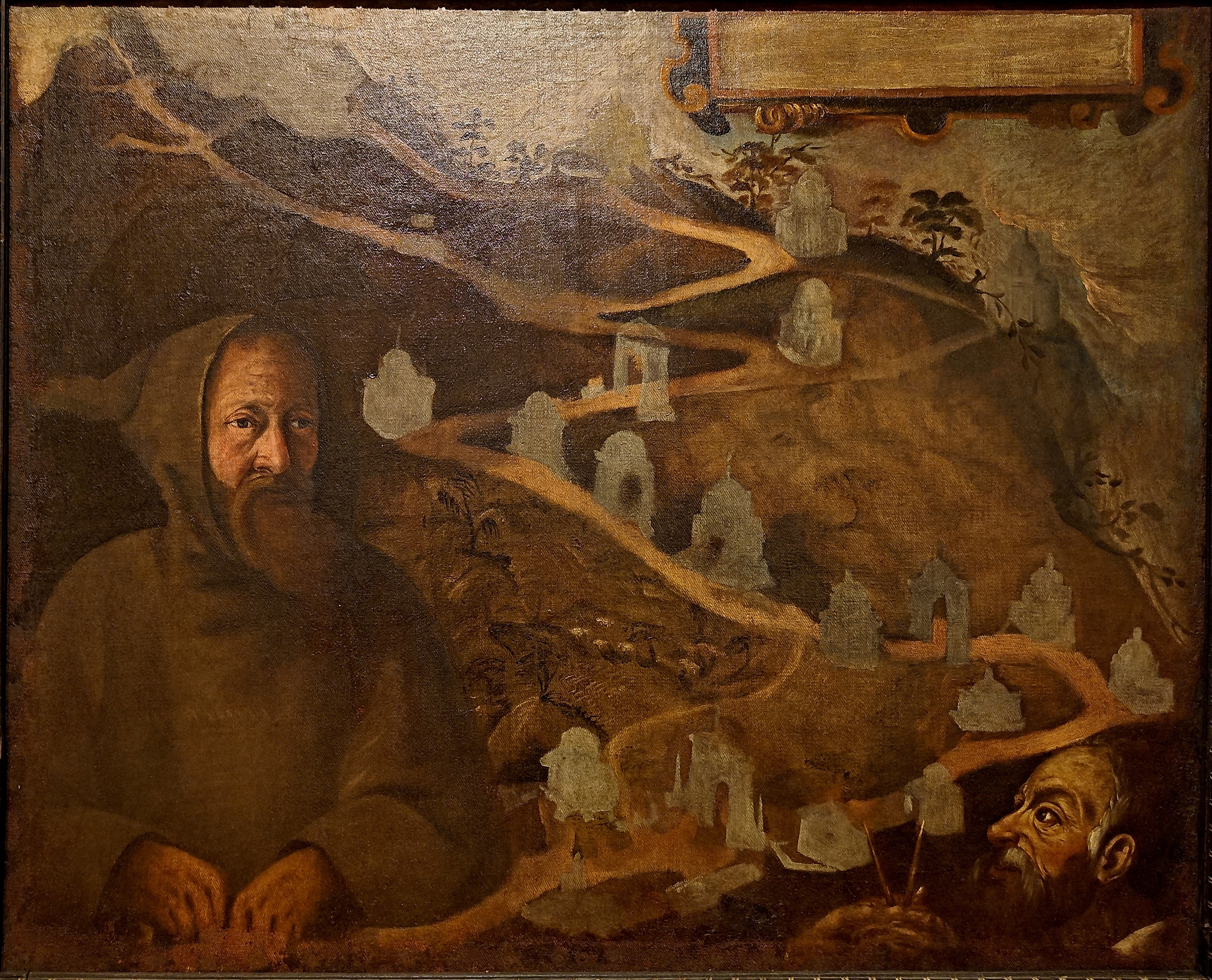
- Bernascone (bottom right) designing the Sacro Monte of Varese
- Born: 1560; Varese, Duchy of Milan
- Died: 1625 (aged 64–65); Varese, Duchy of Milan
- Occupation: Architect
- Buildings: Basilica of San Vittore, Varese; Sacro Monte di Varese

Giuseppe Bernascone, also known as Il Mancino (the left handed), was an Italian architect known for being the architect of the Sacro Monte di Varese, and the Basilica of San Vittore, Varese, along with Pellegrino Tibaldi.

== Life and Career ==
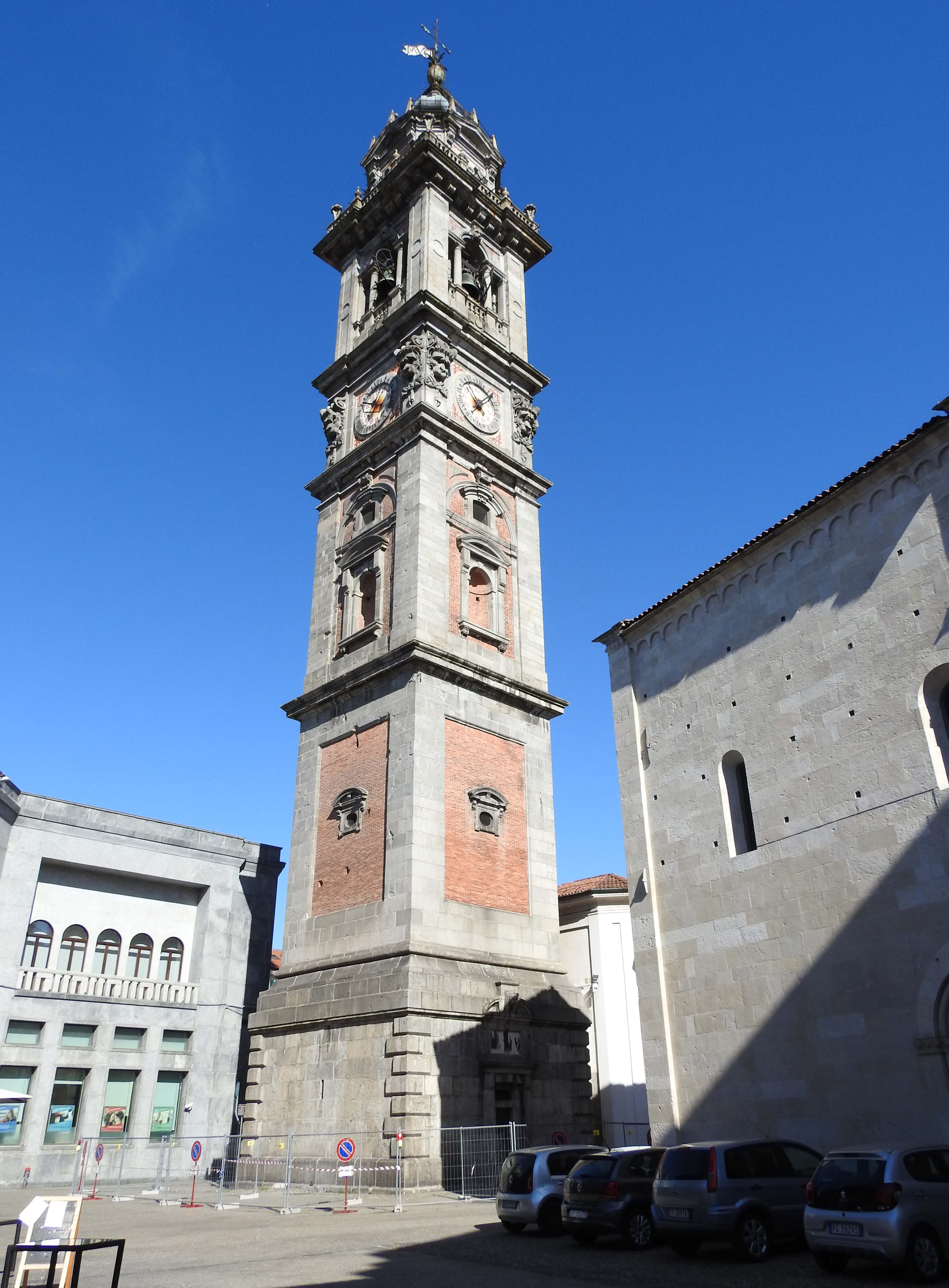
The bell tower of San Vittore, designed by Bernascone

Information on his early life is rather scarce; it is said he was born in Varese between 1560 and 1565, and died there between 1625 and 1627, or 1630. He was taught by Pellegrino Tibaldi, a renowned Milanese architect employed by Federico Borromeo.

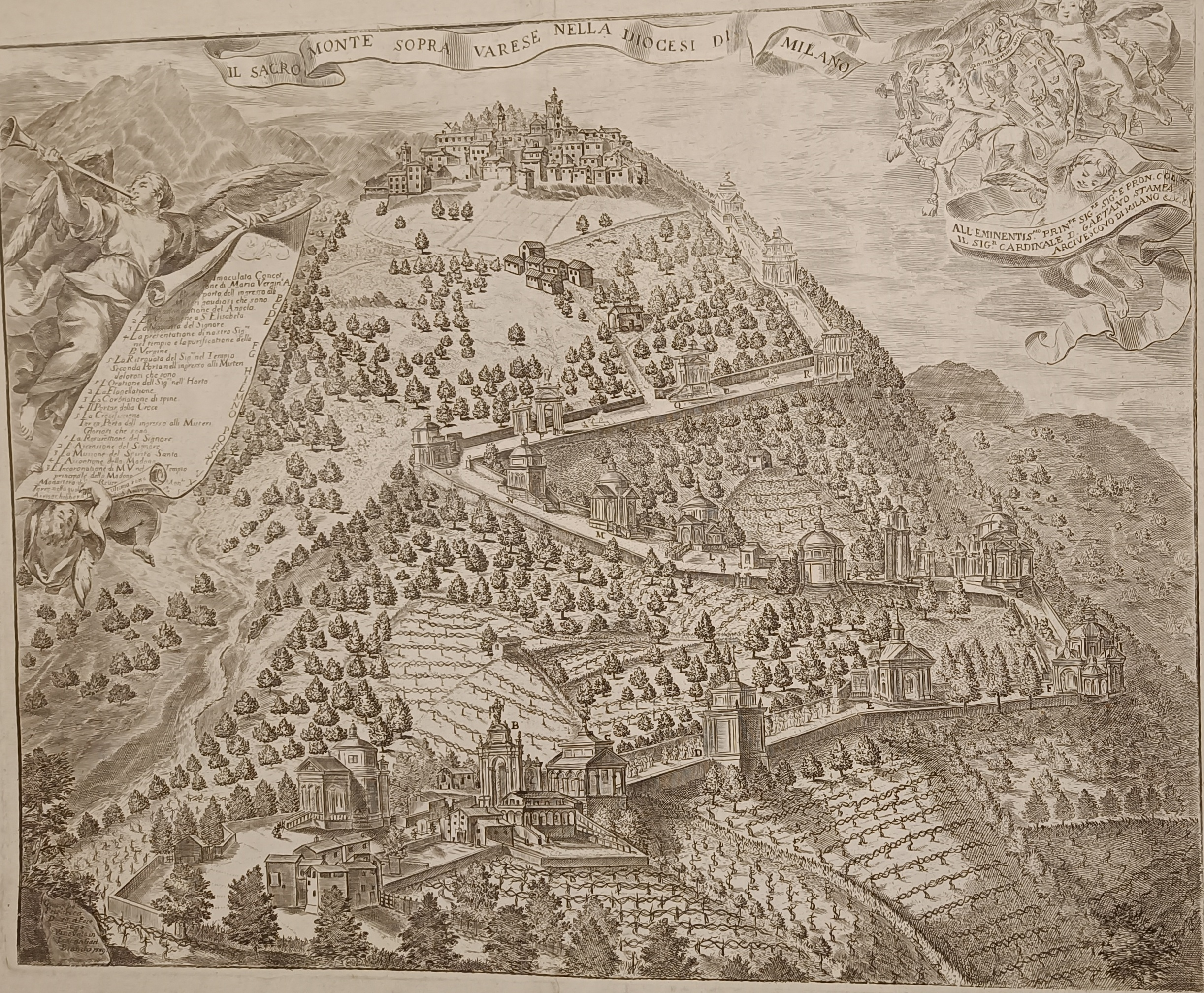
View of the Sacro Monte in 1739

Between 1598 and 1630, he and Tibaldi designed the Basilica of San Vittore in Varese. He worked mostly on the presbytery, the Lantern tower, and the bell tower, which was concluded 140 years after his death in 1773. He also designed the bell tower of the Sanctuary of Santa Maria del Monte between 1598 and 1600, and the façade of the Church of Sant'Antonio alla Motta between 1592 and 1606, and the church of San Giuseppe.

He is mostly known for his design of the Sacro Monte di Varese, its Chapels, and its church. Construction of the chapels began in 1604 and concluded in 1627. He also contributed to the design and construction of the Sanctuary of Madonna del Sasso, Switzerland.
