= Sacro Monte di Varese =

One of the nine sacri monti in the Italian regions of Lombardy and Piedmont

Coordinates: 45.860361°N 8.793222°E

Sacred Mountain of Varese Sacro Monte di Varese Santuario di Santa Maria del Monte
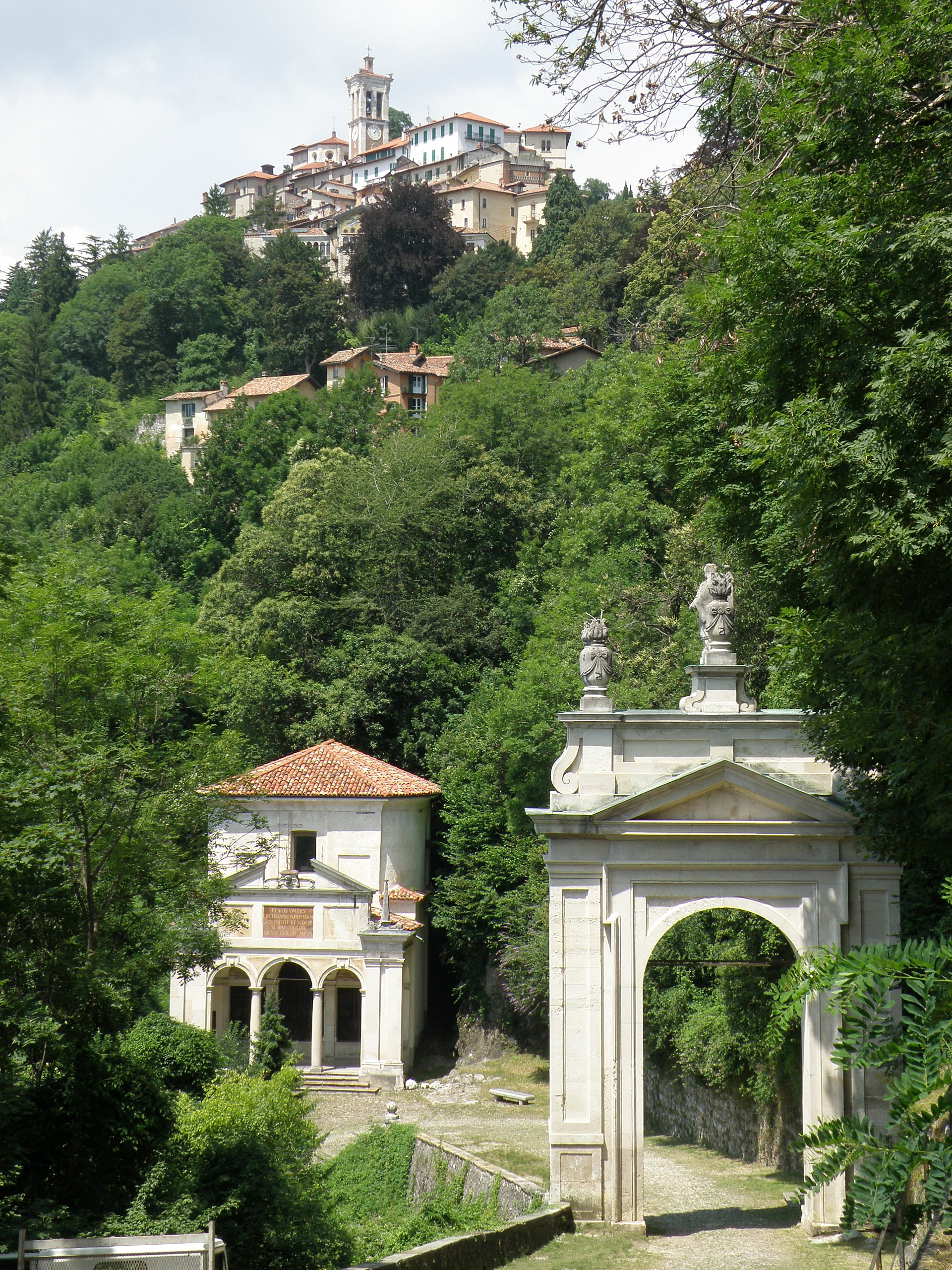
- The 10th chapel, beyond the St Ambrose arch, and Santa Maria del Monte atop the mountain

Religion
- Affiliation: Roman Catholic
- Province: Varese
- Ecclesiastical or organisational status: National monument
- Status: Active

Location
- Location: Varese, Italy
- Interactive map of Sacred Mountain of Varese; Sacro Monte di Varese; Santuario di Santa Maria del Monte

Architecture
- Type: Church
- Groundbreaking: 1596
- Completed: 1604

Website
- www.sacromontevarese.net/it/info-turistiche

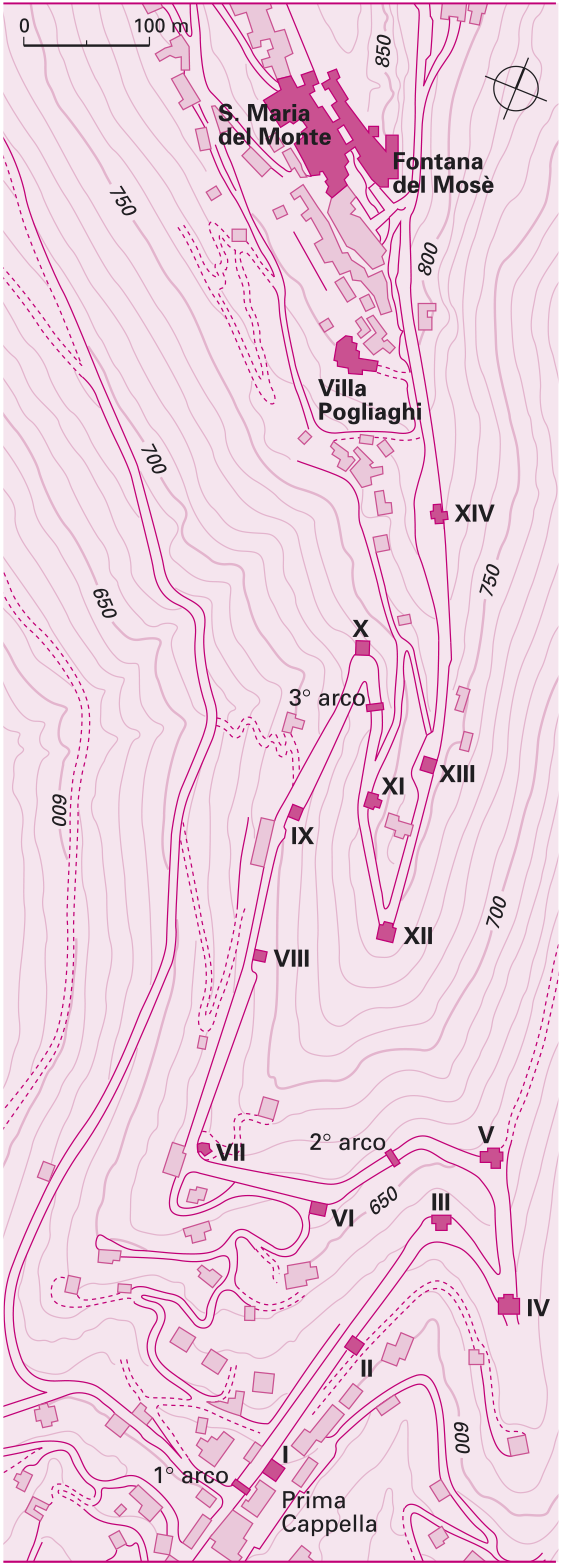
Map of the Sacro Monte (Rosary Sanctuary) of Varese. Scale 0:100 m. I Chapel of the Annunciation, II Chapel of the Visitation, III Chapel of the Nativity, IV Chapel of the Presentation in the Temple, V Chapel of the Disputation in the Temple, VI Chapel of the Agony in the Garden, VII Chapel of the Flagellation, VIII Chapel of the Crowning with Thorns, IX Chapel of the Ascent to Calvary, X Chapel of the Mystery of the Crucifixion, XI Chapel of the Resurrection, XII Chapel of the Ascension, XIII Chapel of the Descent of the Holy Spirit, XIV Chapel of the Assumption of the Virgin.

The Sacro Monte di Varese (literally 'Sacred Mountain of Varese') is one of the nine sacri monti in the Italian regions of Lombardy and Piedmont which were inscribed on the UNESCO list of World Heritage Sites in 2003. It has an altitude of 807 metres above sea level.

== Description ==
The Sacro Monte of Varese is located a few kilometres from the city of Varese in the frazione Santa Maria del Monte. It is nestled in the Campo dei Fiori Regional Park which literally translates to "Field of Flowers". It is accessed by a Holy Road and includes the Sanctuary, as well as a small medieval village surrounding the Sanctuary. The Holy Road with its 14 chapels, rises up the mountain to the little village of Santa Maria del Monte and ends at the Sanctuary (15th chapel) dedicated to the Virgin Mary. The rise is 2 kilometres along a cobblestone path, and every chapel represents one of the Joyful, Sorrowful, and Glorious Mysteries of the Rosary. Located at the mountaintop are the Sanctuary, the Cloister of Monache Romite Ambrosiane, the Museo Baroffio e del Santuario, the Casa Museo Lodovico Pogliaghi, a permanent nativity scene, and several restaurants, bars, a pizzeria, three hotels and a bed & breakfast.

The recently restored Vellone-Sacro Monte funicular operates between a parking lot at the first chapel "Prima Cappella" and the top of Sacro Monte on Saturdays and Sundays throughout most of the year.

On 14 May 2021, asteroid 113671 Sacromonte, discovered by amateur astronomer Luca Buzzi at the Schiaparelli Observatory in 2002, was named by the Working Group for Small Bodies Nomenclature after the Sacro Monte of Varese.

== History ==
The Santuario di Santa Maria del Monte

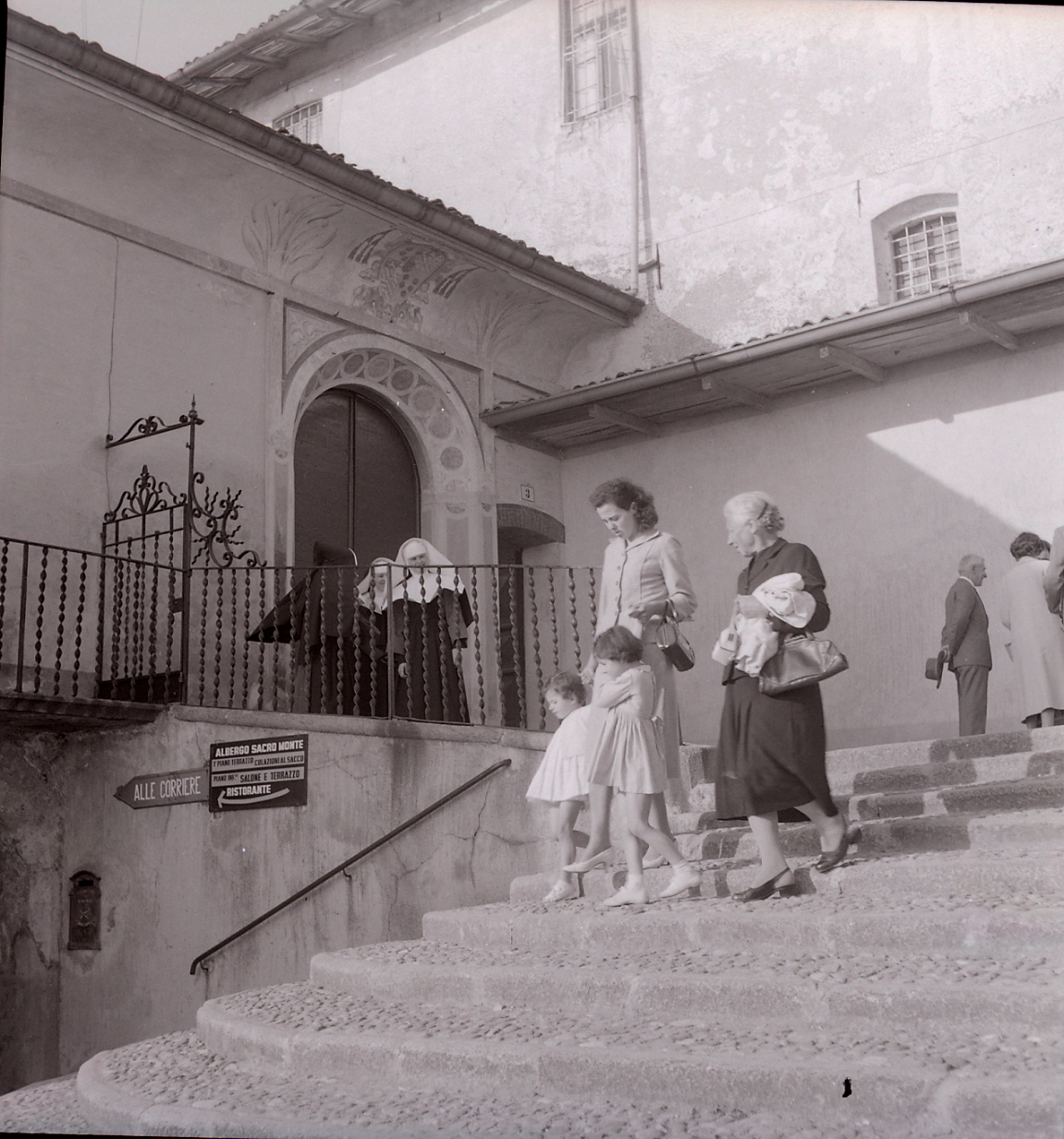
The monastery square in 1980: in the background the so-called "water gate", which gives access to the courtyard dedicated to visitors.

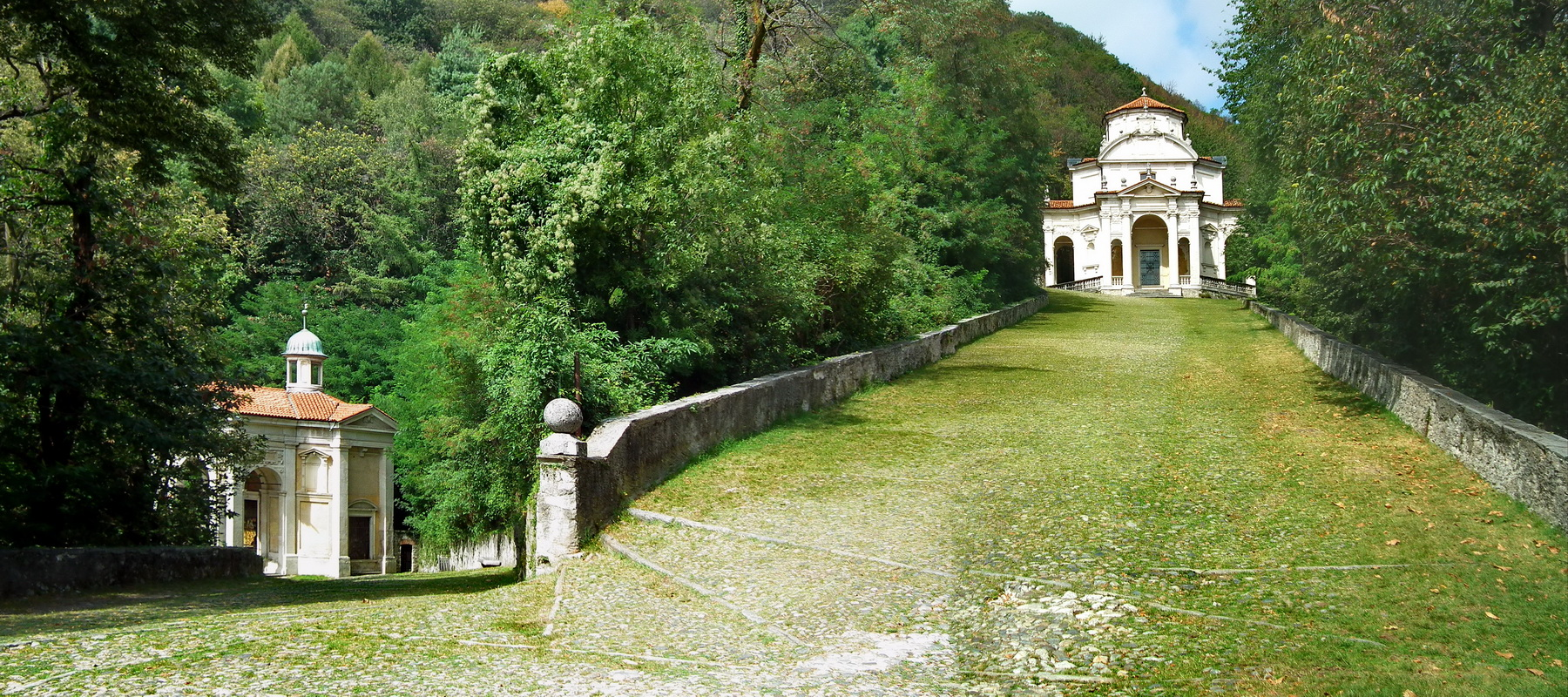
Third and Fifth Chapel

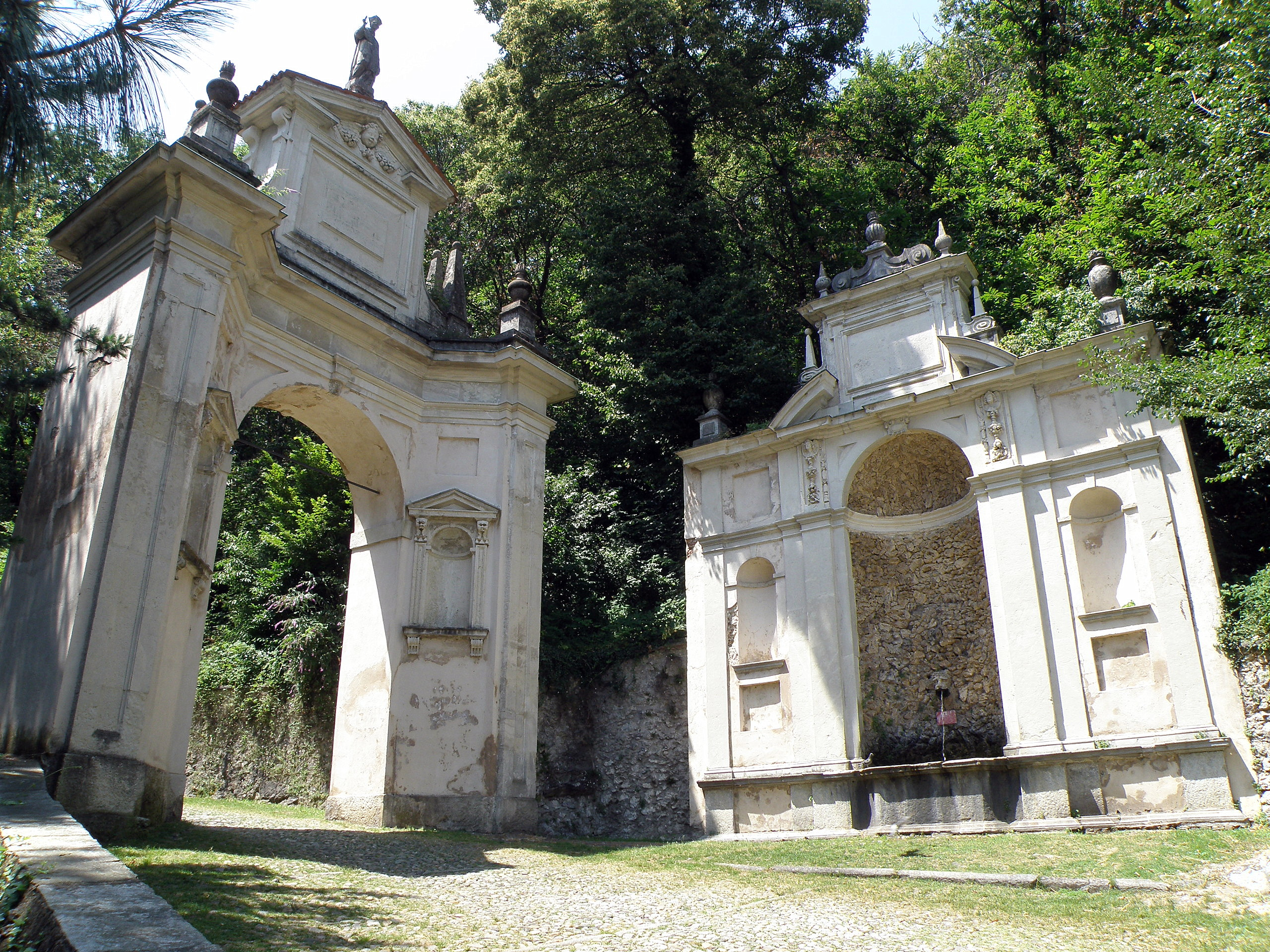
St Charles arch with fountain

The Sacro Monte di Varese reflects completely the idea that a Sacred Mountain shall be collocated in a natural environment of relevant landscape interest, on an upland where there's already a pre-existing secular tradition of pilgrimage and testimonies of faith. Monte Orona's landscape, situated inside the Parco regionale Campo dei Fiori, along the slopes of which descend the cobbled road over two kilometres long that touches the 14 chapels, is typical of the Varese Prealps, with vast beech, chestnut and hazel woods. The hill has witnessed significant manifestations of faith, the origin of which digresses in the legend. It is believed, in fact, that in the place where the sanctuary dedicated to the Madonna is located (point of arrival of the devotional path) in the fourth century there was already a modest chapel built by Sant'Ambrogio as thanks for the victory over the Arians.

An 11th-century Romanesque sanctuary (of which the crypt has been preserved), possibly built on a previous early medieval building, was previously located on this site. It was equipped on the outside with an endonarthex to accommodate the faithful, because even then people from all over the world flocked to the sanctuary on Mount Orona, from Milan and the Canton of Ticino. Around the sanctuary, a village gradually aggregated with houses for priests and lay people who worked there and with shelters for pilgrims.

The sanctuary, now insufficient to accommodate pilgrims, was almost entirely rebuilt in 1472 based on a design by the architect Bartolomeo Gadio, assuming a layout with three naves and three apses, arranged in a triconch. A subsequent extension is due to the extension of the central nave towards the entrance. Still in the second half of the 15th century the blessed Caterina da Pallanza and Giuliana da Busto Arsizio, who later became founders of the Order of the Ambrosian hermits, retired to a hermitage adjacent to the sanctuary to lead a life of prayer; their example was followed by other young women. In 1474 Pope Sixtus IV granted the community to erect a monastery, and on 10 August 1476 the nuns took the veil.

Shortly after the fifteenth century reconstruction of the sanctuary, supported by Gian Galeazzo Maria Sforza, there was a large flow of artists from the Milanese area to create the decorative apparatus. Among these - as representatives of the illustrious workshops of carvers who worked between the second half of the fifteenth and the first half of the sixteenth century in the Milan area - we must remember the Master of Trognano, author of the wooden panels that adorned the high altar, and Andrea from Milan, author of the sculptural group depicting the Adoration of the Magi still present in the sanctuary. Other liturgical works and furnishings, formerly belonging to the sanctuary, are kept in the Sanctuary Museum, also known as the Baroffio Museum.

It should also be remembered that at the end of the 16th century the Romite Ambrosiane had promoted the construction, in the cloistered perimeter, of some chapels dedicated to the Passion of Christ populated with polychrome statues.

During the seventeenth century, parallel to the works in the Fabbrica del Santissimo Rosario, artists who were also active in other Sacred Mountains were called to the sanctuary, such as Giovanni Mauro della Rovere known as Fiammenghino (author of the frescoes in the side aisles) and the Prestinari brothers (probable authors of the wooden group of the "Presentation of Jesus in the Temple").

The foundation of the Sacro Monte

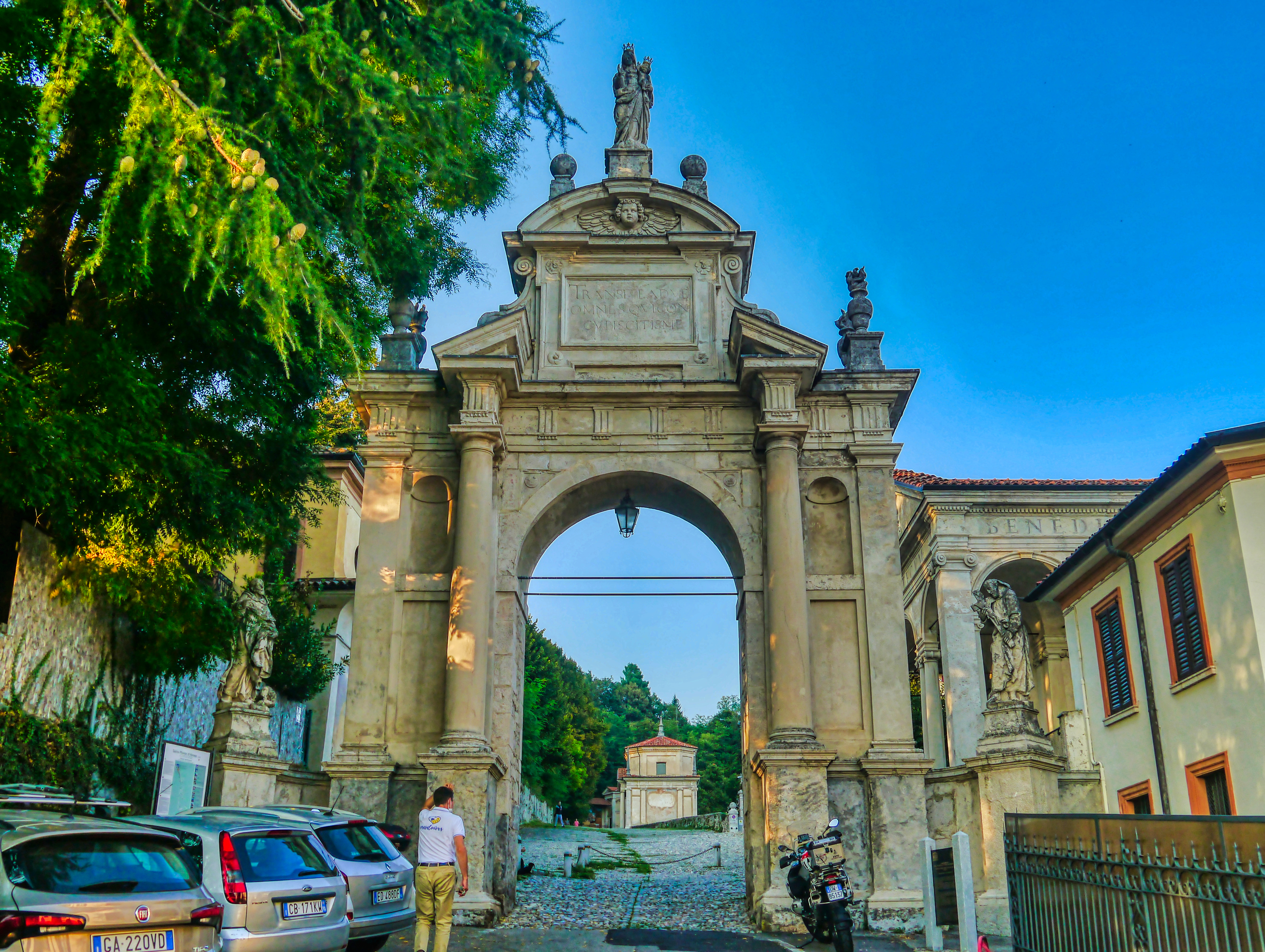
Arch of the Rosary, the entrance of Sacro Monte

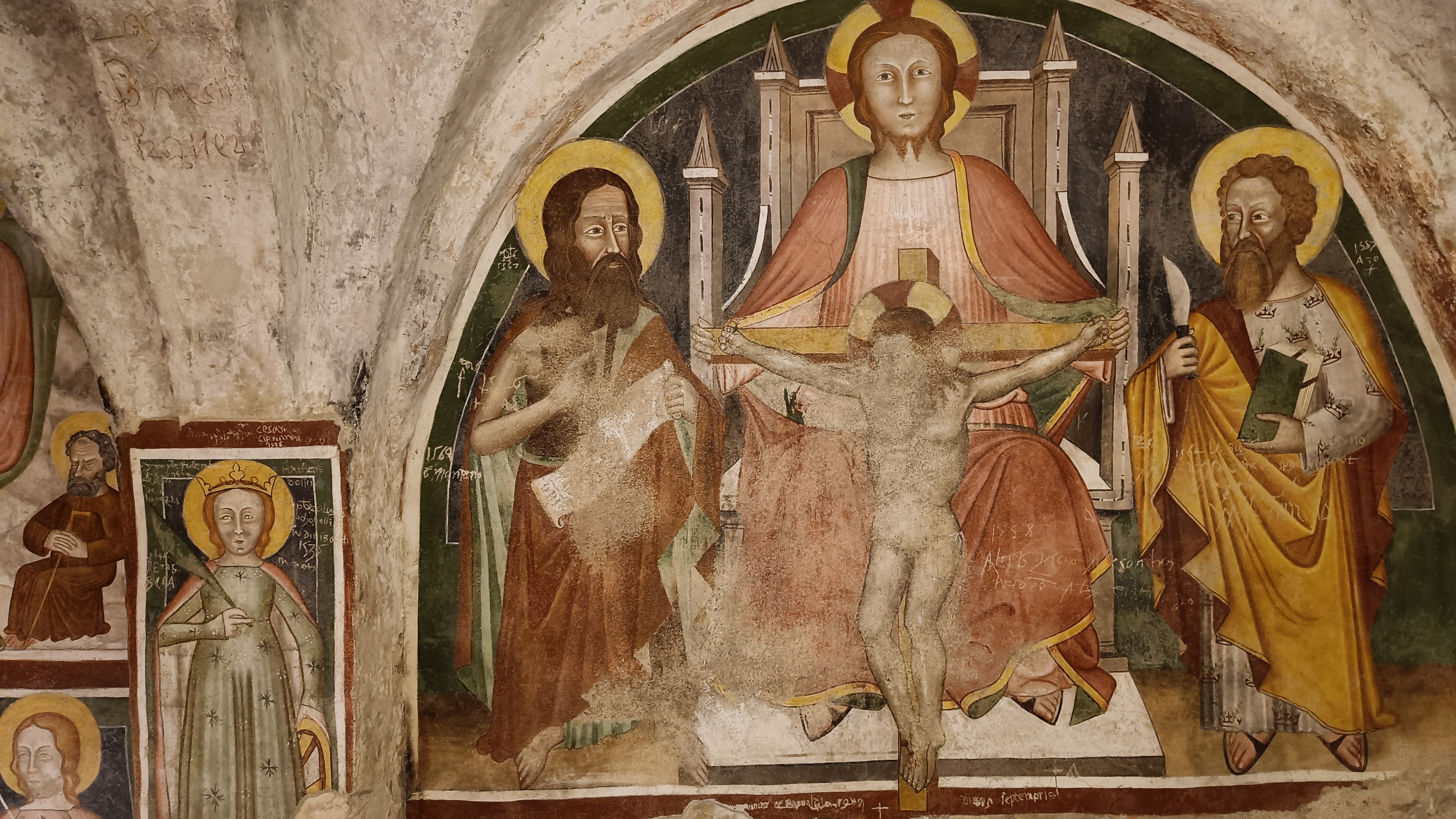
14th century frescoes in the sanctuary crypt

It was one of the hermits of the monastery, Sister Maria Tecla Cid, who conceived at the beginning of the seventeenth century the idea of a route capable of easily connecting the Varese plain with the sanctuary and the village on the mountain of Santa Maria, offering the comfort of stops and the opportunity to meditate on the Mysteries of the Rosary. Previously the only access to the Sanctuary followed the steep path that still today connects the Velate district to the Sacro Monte and Campo dei Fiori, passing through a place, Monte San Francesco in Pertica, which for centuries had housed a tower of Roman sighting first and then one of the oldest Franciscan communities.

The idea found enthusiastic support and tireless organizational support from the Capuchin father Giovanni Battista Aguggiari who took steps to involve some noble Milanese families in the enterprise and to extend the collection of funds to the communities of the faithful of numerous countries over a large surrounding area.

In 1604 the architect Giuseppe Bernascone, known as "il Mancino", was summoned to design the various chapels and the scenic route along the slopes of the mountain: he was the true artistic director of the construction of the entire devotional complex. In this way, in 1604, the Fabbrica del Ss. Rosario began. In this regard, it must be remembered that the recitation of the rosary had been codified in its present form by Pope Pius V in 1569 and had become popular after the battle of Lepanto (1571). Since then, it had had a formidable expansion as a collective recitation even in processional rites. It is thus understood how desirable and urgent it should appear that the numerous processions to the sanctuary of Santa Maria could take place in the theatrical setting of an ascent marked by the rhythmic succession of prayers with moments of pause in which to meditate in front of the Mysteries represented plastically and vividly in the chapels.

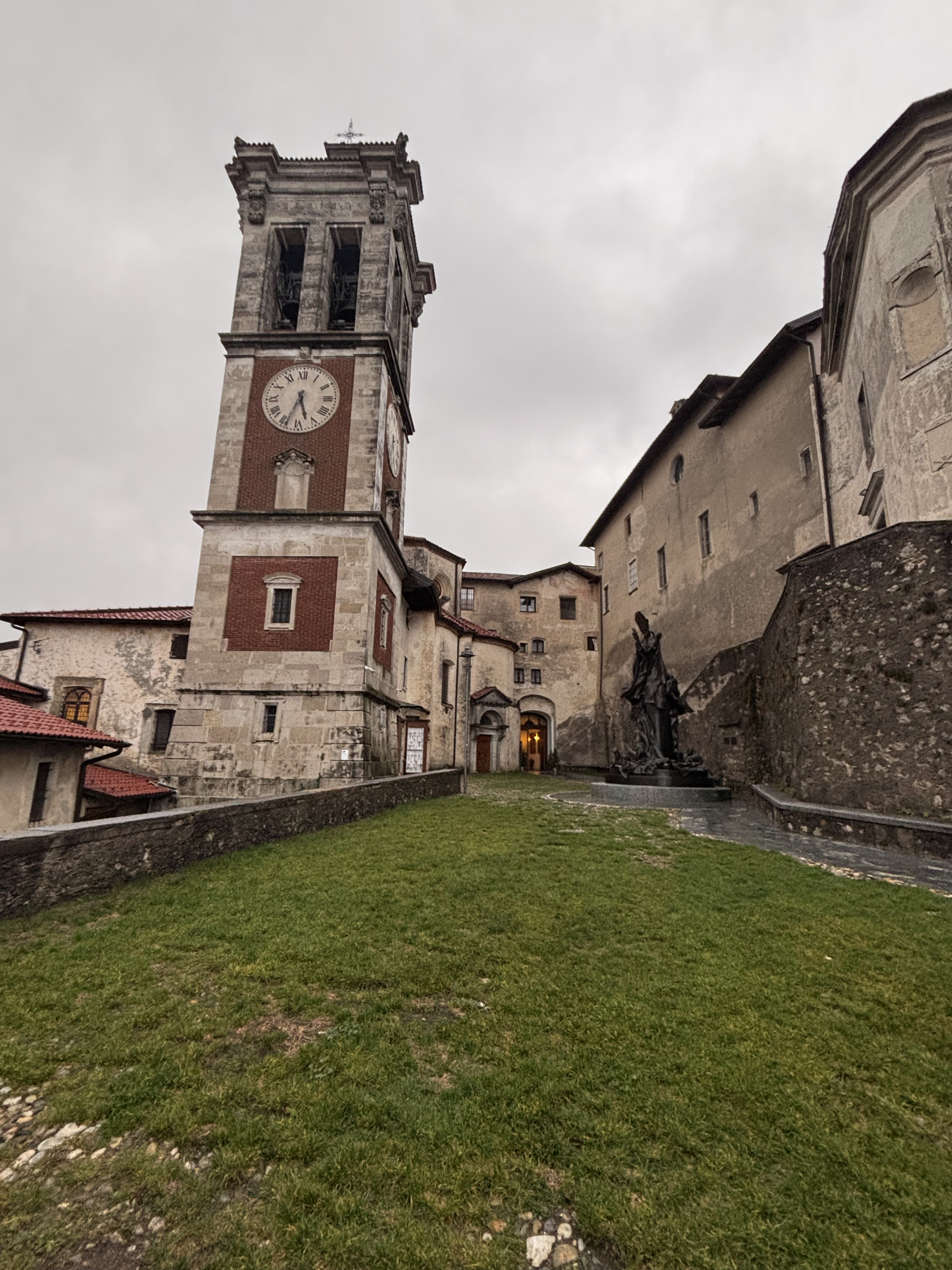
The Church of Santa Maria del Monte

The construction of the Sacro Monte di Varese was much faster than that of other Sacred Mountains, and thirteen of the fourteen planned chapels were completed by 1623. In 1698 the works were completed in their present form, including the painted terracotta statues and the frescoes that have the task of illusively enlarging the scene of the various Mysteries.

The speed of the works in the first twenty years of the Fabbrica del Ss. Rosario (which appeared to be a miraculous thing at that time) was the result not only of the financial resources, but also of the undoubted organizational skills of Father Aguggiari and the other "deputies of the Fabbrica": the many types of different manpower needed (bricklayers, carpenters, plasterers, etc.) were recruited with coupons displayed in the markets of Como, Lugano and Varese.

Until 1610 the works were coordinated by the "deputies" of the Fabbrica; subsequently, there was a direct and constant interest on the part of Federico Borromeo. In 1612, after a pastoral visit, he wrote the Decrees that governed, at times even in detail, the plan for the realization of the Sacro Monte, especially for the iconographic program which was to be inspired by the post-Tridentine artistic canons. In the same period, the Milanese cardinal also supervised the construction of the Sacro Monte di Orta and that of Arona.

After the interruption due to the plague of 1630–32, the works of decoration of the chapels continued above all, which in 1698 were, as mentioned, completed.

From 1859 to 1927 the village was an independent comune. In 1927 it became a frazione of Varese.

== Description of the Chapels ==
The Sacro Monte di Varese, for the quality of the artists who participated in its construction, is a testimony of great importance to the artistic culture developed in the Duchy of Milan.

=== Architecture of the Chapels ===
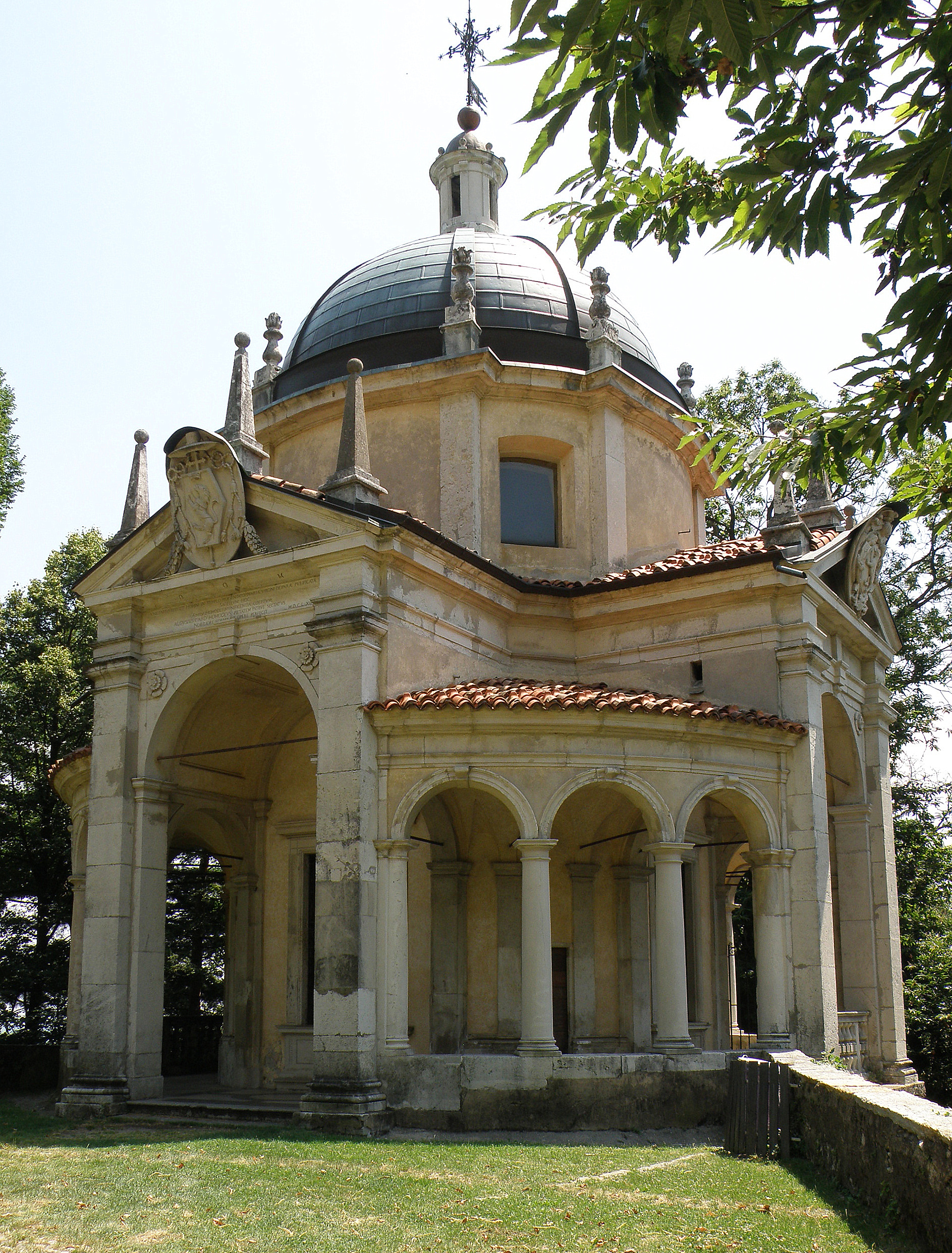
Fourth Chapel

The greatest fervour of activity, during the seventeenth century, was recorded around the chapels of the Sacro Monte. Here the artistic quality of Giuseppe Bernascone, known as "il Mancino" is appreciated first of all in his ability to represent the prayer of the Rosary "in the form of a monument" by harmoniously blending architectural structures and landscape together. This "scenographic" attitude - which also earned him his involvement in the construction site of the Sacro Monte di Locarno - is revealed in the double attention to how the spectator should perceive from a distance the unfolding of the chapels and triumphal arches along the layout of the wide cobbled road, and how the pilgrim should enjoy, from some chapels, the view towards the plain and the lake of Varese. It is not by chance the presence of some chapels, around which runs a portico that invites the visitor to admire the landscape all around.

It was hypothesized, given the singularly unitary conception of the Sacro Monte di Varese, that Bernascone, at least until 1627, assumed the role of "director-scenographer" discussing the solutions to be adopted for each "mystery chapel" with the artists called to populate them with statues and frescoes. He also had to receive ideas and advice from some of these artists; first of all by Pier Francesco Mazzucchelli known as Morazzone, called to fresco the VII chapel (The flagellation) when he had acquired the reputation of a painter able to interpret with great skill that figurative realism and those mystical impulses, capable of instilling in the faithful feelings of piety and of devotion, in accordance with the pedagogical program that Cardinal Federico Borromeo entrusted to sacred art.

=== Decoration of the Chapels ===
A large group of artists were called to create the chapels, united by the sharing of Frederick's conception of art and the experience of works in the Piedmontese and Lombard Sacred Mountains made in a language that goes, without stylistic contrasts, from Mannerism to Baroque. Among them, the presence of modellers such as the brothers Marco Aurelio and Cristoforo Prestinari, Dionigi Bussola, Giovanni Ghisolfi, Martino Retti and Francesco Silva, and painters such as the aforementioned Morazzone, Carlo Francesco Nuvolone, Antonio Busca, the brothers Giovan Battista and Giovanni Francesco Lampugnani, Francesco Maria Bianchi and others. Together with Bernascone, they gave the Sacro Monte di Varese the appearance of a sort of open-air museum of that high season of the Lombard seventeenth century that revolves around the figure of Federico Borromeo.

The chapels, like the Mysteries of the Rosary, are divided into groups of five, separated from each other by triumphal arches and fountains for the refreshment of pilgrims. There are fourteen chapels created by Bernascone, one less than the Mysteries of the Rosary, since the sanctuary - the destination of the itinerary - assumes the function of the fifteenth and last chapel, thanks to the construction, in those years, of a new marble altar dedicated to the Coronation of the Virgin, which contains a fourteenth-century wooden statue, an icon object of special veneration.

n.	Architecture	Subject of the chapel	Description	Image
1st		Annunciation	Statues by Cristoforo Prestinari	
2nd		Visitation	Frescoes by Giovanni Paolo Ghianda, sculptures by Francesco Silva	
3rd		Nativity of Jesus	Exterior and interiors frescoes by Carlo Francesco Nuvolone; his Flight into Egypt, painted on the outside wall, deteriorated over the centuries and in 1983 was replaced with a same subject fresco by Renato Guttuso. The statues of the internal scene are probably the work of Martino Rezzi.	centro
4th		Presentation of Jesus	Built thanks to the funding of Cardinal Luigi Alessandro Omodei (whose coat of arms appears on the pediment), with frescoes by Giovanni Ghisolfi and sculptures by Francesco Silva	
5th		Disputation	Contains 22 statues by Francesco Silva, colored by Carlo Francesco Nuvolone.	
6th		Agony in the Garden	The interiors statues are by Francesco Silva, frescoes by Bartolomeo Ghiandone (restored by Girolamo Poloni in the 1920s).	
7th		Flagellation of Christ	Made on commission of the brothers Girolamo and Francesco Litta, it is considered among the best productions. The frescoes of the pronaos and interiors are the work of Morazzone; the terracotta statues (among which stand out the Pietà, Saint Jerome and Saint Francis) are by Martino Rezzi.	
8th		Crown of thorns	With statues by Francesco Silva and frescoes by Giovan Battista Recchi (1587–1668) and Giovan Paolo Recchi (1606–1686), pupils of Morazzone	
9th		Procession to Calvary	Contains twenty statues created by Francesco Silva and frescoes by Giovan Paolo Recchi. On the wall facing the valley there is a Ecce homo fresco (almost completely faded) by Stefano Maria Legnani, also known as Legnanino.	
10th		Crucifixion of Jesus	It houses fifty terracotta statues by Dionigi Bussola, made in the third quarter of the 17th century; coeval are the frescoes, work of Antonio Busca.	centro
11th		Resurrection of Jesus	It hosts nine statues by Francesco Silva (1622) and frescoes (with scenes from Paradise and the Apparitions of Jesus to Mary, Mary Magdalene and the Apostles) by Isidoro Bianchi.	centro
12th	centro	Ascension of Jesus	It was built thanks to the funding of the Milanese noblemen Pietro and Antonio Carcano, whose family coat of arms appears on the pediment. All the sculptural decoration was made in 1632 by Francesco Silva. The frescoes were redone in the 1920s.	
13th	centro	Pentecost	Francesco Silva made the fifteen terracotta statues; the frescoes are by Federico Bianchi.	
14th		Assumption of Mary	Stautes by Francesco Silva, while the cycle of frescoes was begun by Stefano Legnani in 1717 and completed by Pietro Gilardi.	centro
15th		Coronation of Mary (Santa Maria del Monte sanctuary)	The last chapel is the sanctuary, with his imposing baroque high altar, erected by Giuseppe Rusnati in 1660, that represents the coronation of the Virgin and houses the ancient effigy of the "Black Madonna".	centro

== Sources ==
- Samuel Butler (1881). Alps and Sanctuaries of Piedmont and the Canton Ticino.
- Carlo Alberto Lotti, ed. (1987). La decima cappella del Sacro Monte di Varese (in Italian). Edizione Amilcare Pizzi.
- Luigi Zanzi; Paolo Zanzi, eds. (2002). Atlante dei Sacri Monti prealpini (in Italian). Milano: Skira.
- Franco Restelli; Paola Viotto (2005). Sacro Monte di Varese (in Italian). Varese: Macchione Editore.
- Lombardia (in Italian). Milano: Touring Club Italiano. p. 205.
