= Basilica of San Vittore, Varese =

Basilica in Varese, Italy

Coordinates: 45.8186°N 8.8270°E

Basilica of San Vittore
- The Prepositural Collegiate Basilica of San Vittore
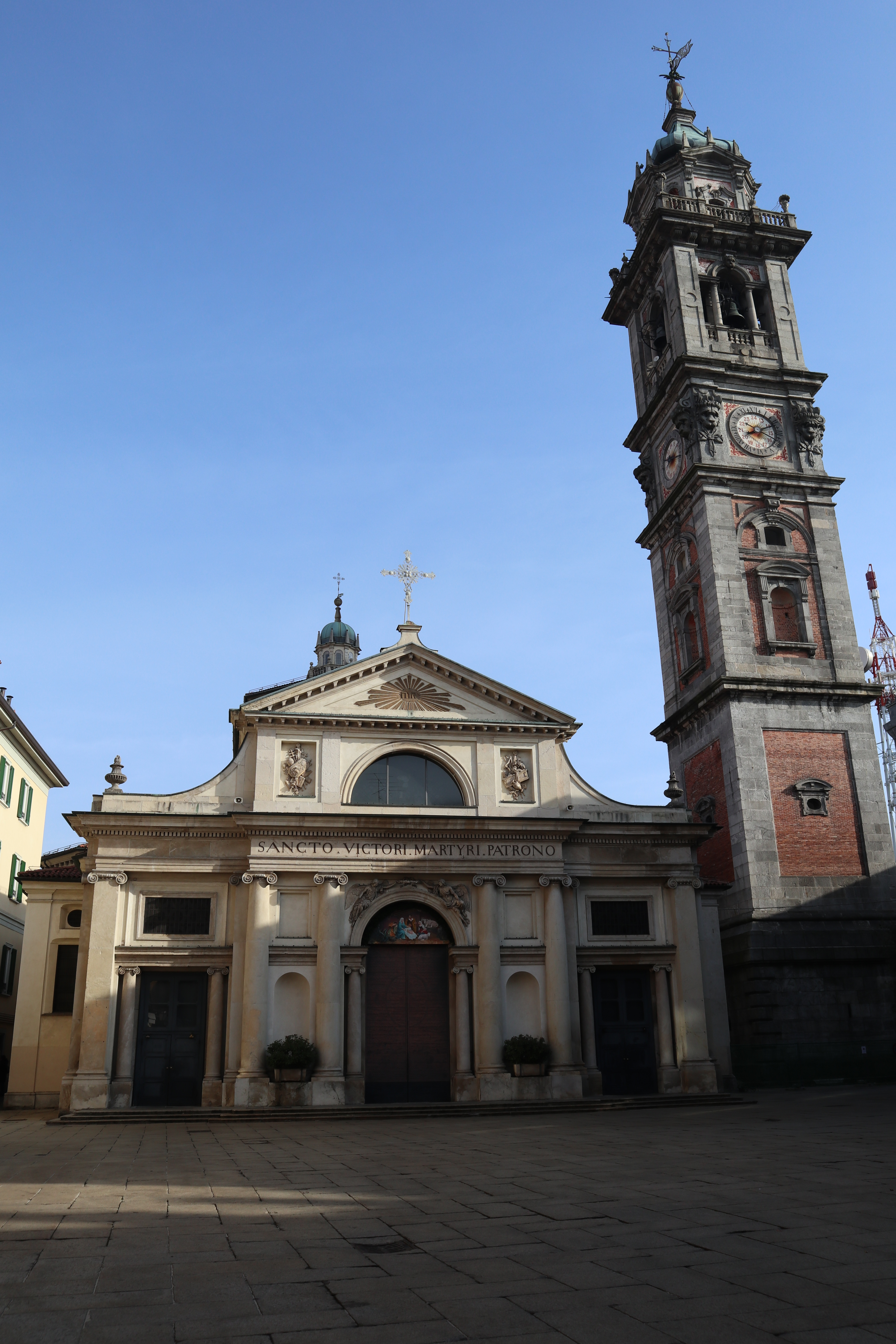
- The façade of the Basilica
- Basilica of San Vittore
- Location: Varese
- Country: Italy
- Denomination: Roman Catholic

History
- Founded: 16th century

Architecture
- Architect(s): Pellegrino Tibaldi, Leopoldo Pollack, Giuseppe Bernascone
- Style: Baroque
- Years built: 1500–1791

Administration
- Diocese: Diocese of Milan

Clergy
- Priest: Mons. Gabriele Gioia

The Basilica of San Vittore is a Catholic Basilica located in the centre of Varese, Italy. Built between 1500 and 1791, it is adjacent to the Baptistery of San Giovanni, erected in the 12th century. The Basilica is dedicated to San Vittore.

== History ==
=== Construction ===
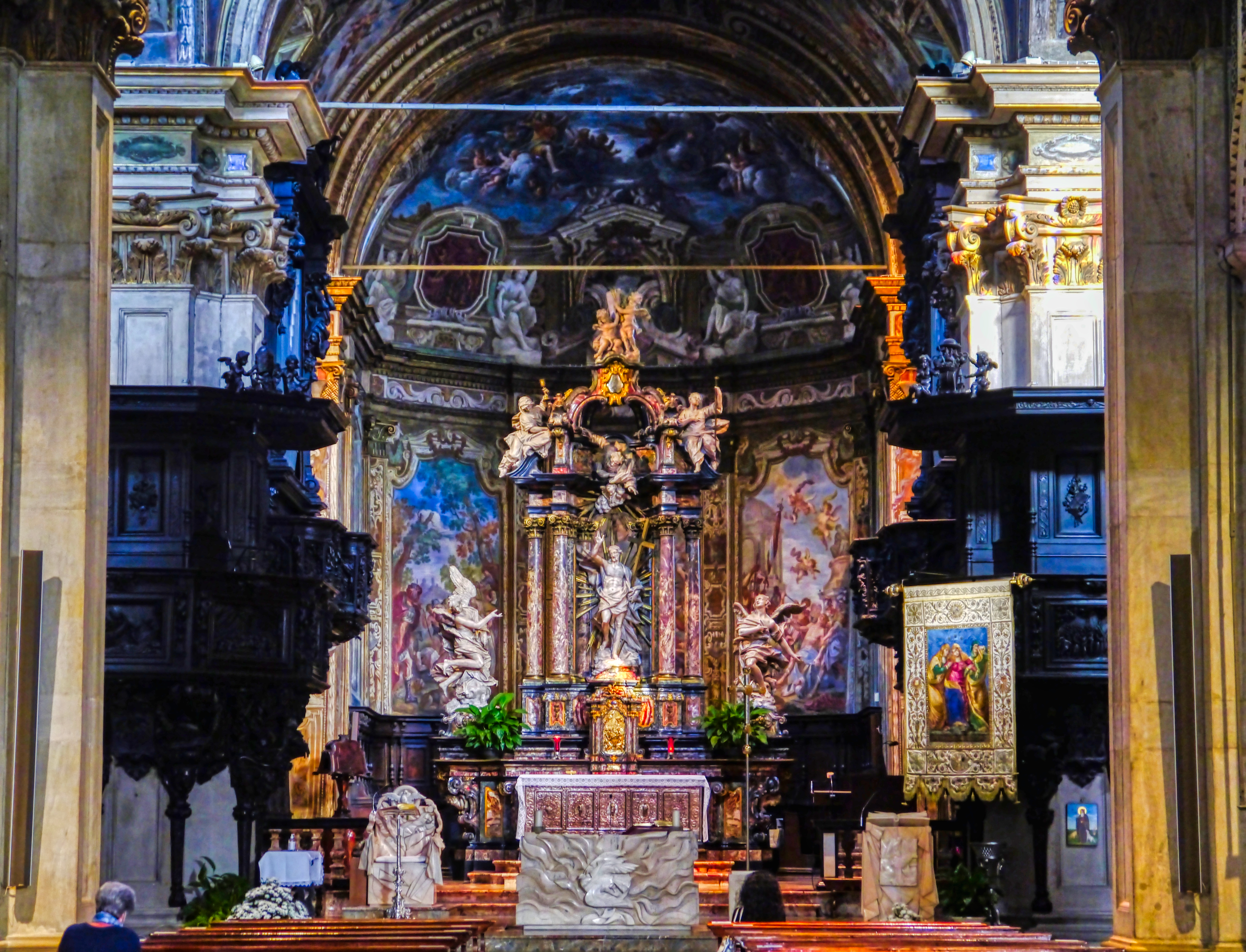
The altar

Construction began in the early/mid 16th century, probably replacing a previous Basilica built in the 13th century. The presbytery was the first part of the building to be constructed, with its construction commencing in 1500 and concluding before 1542. It was consecrated in 1542. The transept was built and designed by Pellegrino Tibaldi and Giuseppe Bernascone between 1580 and 1625. The façade was constructed between 1788 and 1791 by Leopoldo Pollack and was renovated in the 20th century by Lodovico Pogliaghi. The pulpits were designed by Bernardino Castelli of Velate.

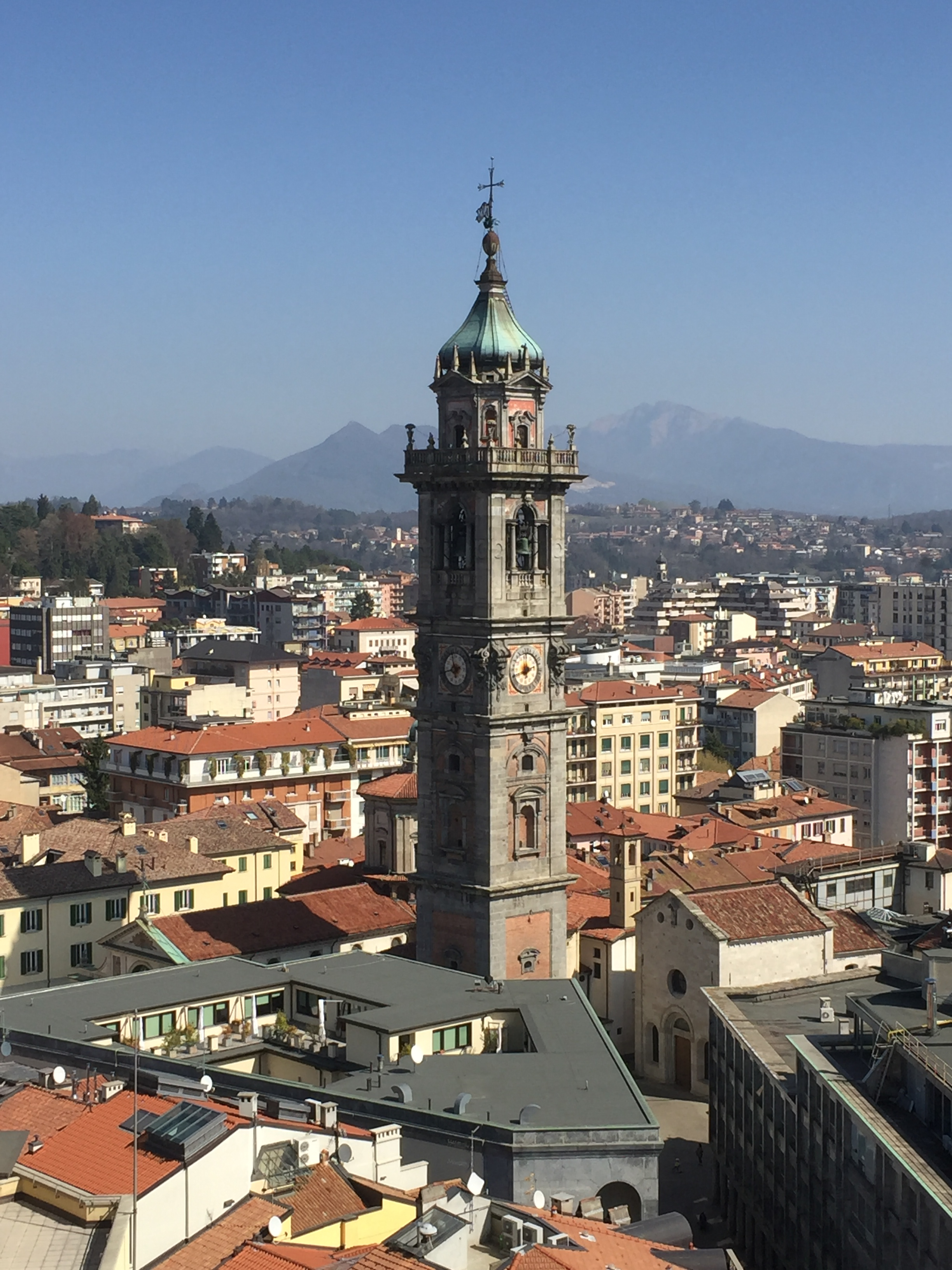
The bell tower viewed from the Torre Civica in Piazza Monte Grappa

The bell tower, built in a baroque style and designed by Bernascone, was constructed over a period of over 150 years, with its construction commencing in 1617 and concluding in 1773. It is 77 meters tall.

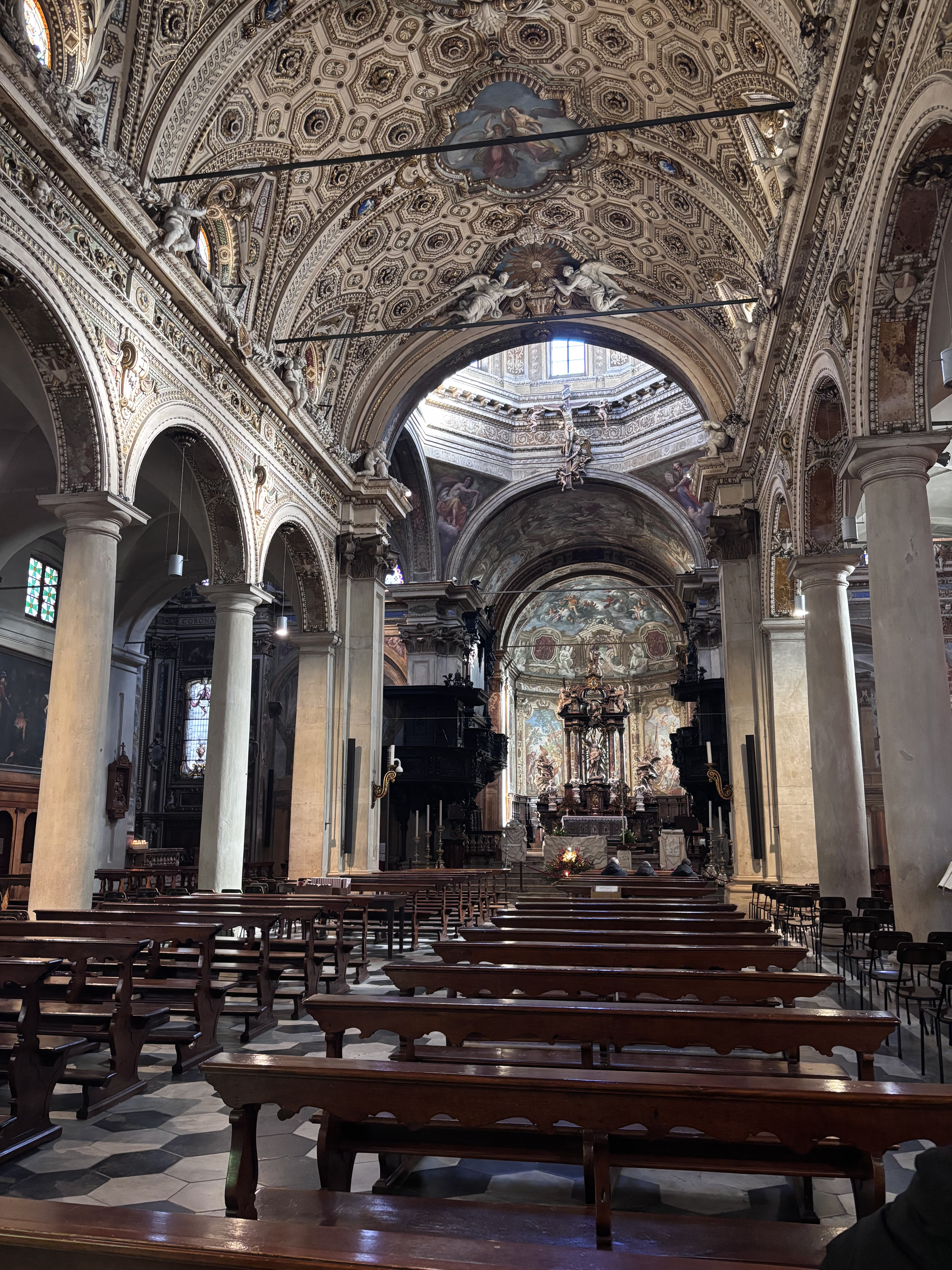
The interior of the basilica

The interior was decorated in a baroque design, and its construction began in the 16th century. It was decorated by many of the most important artists of Varese, including Pier Francesco Mazzucchelli, Salvatore Bianchi, Federico Bianchi, Pietro Antonio Magatti, Giovanni Battista Ronchelli, and by the sculptors Bernardino Castelli and Elia Buzzi. The interior was completed in the 18th century with the conclusion of the decorations on the dome.

On 30 May 1859, the Basilica and the bell tower were hit by a series of cannonballs fired by the Austro-Hungarian Army, commanded by Karl von Urban, due to Varese refusing to pay money during the Battle of Varese. The damage caused by the attack is still visible on the walls of the church. A plaque was erected to commemorate the event.

In 1925 Pope Pius XI elevated it to the status of Minor basilica.

In 2025, the basilica was digitally virtualized in honour of the 100th anniversary since its elevation to Basilica.
