= Tammy (given name) =

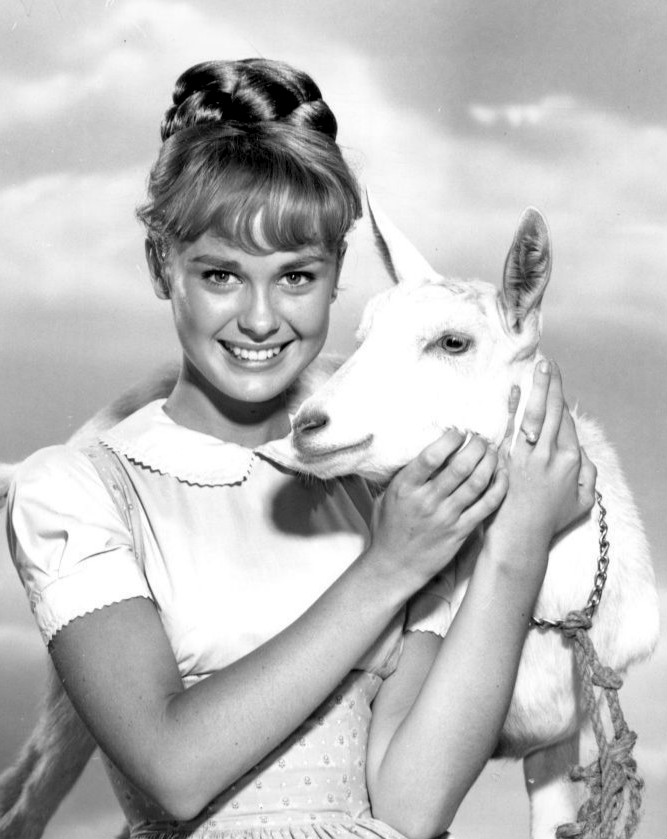
- Actress Debbie Watson portrayed Tammy in the 1965 American television series.

Origin
- Origin: Hebrew or Greek via Aramaic
- Meaning: "palm tree" or "twin"

Other names
- Related names: Tamar, Tamara, Tambrey, Tami, Tamie, Tammi, Tammie, Tamora, Tamsin, Thomas, Thomasin, Thomasina

Tammy is a feminine given name. It can be a short form of the names Tamsin, Thomasina, Thomasin, Tamar, Tamara, Tamora or other names starting with Tam. Tamsin, Thomasina, and Thomasin are feminine versions of the name Thomas, a Greek form of the Aramaic name Te'oma, meaning twin. Tamara is a Russian form of the Hebrew name Tamar, which means "palm tree". In Israel "Tami" (תמי) is commonly used as an abbreviation of the original Hebrew name.

Tammy originated as a Scottish nickname for boys named Tàmhas, the Scottish Gaelic version of Thomas. The name was also used in England as a nickname for girls named Tamsin, a shortened version of Thomasina or Thomasin, all feminine versions of Thomas. Tammy was in greatest use in the 19th century in the southwestern English counties of Devon and Cornwall. United States census records show the name was also in rare use for American girls in the 19th century, either as an independent name or as a nickname for Tamsin or for Tamar and its phonetic variants Tama and Tamma. Tamara began to be used in greater numbers in the United States in the 1930s. Tammy as an independent name remained rare in the Anglosphere until the mid-20th century when it gained popularity due to Tammy Tyree, the main character of Cid Ricketts Sumner's 1948 novel Tammy Out of Time about a lovable backwoods girl who falls in love with a plane crash survivor. There were 39 times more American girls named Tammy born in 1958 than there were in 1956. The increase in popularity was due to the 1957 romantic comedy film Tammy and the Bachelor, which was based on Sumner's novel, and the hit song from the film, Tammy. The full name of the book and film character was Tambrey, an invention by Sumner inspired by Ambry, from the 1852 book Lexicon of Ladies' Names With Their Floral Emblems by American Sarah Carter, in which Ambry is said to be derived from the name of the amaranth plant, symbolizing eternal life. The 1957 film was followed by three loosely related films on the same theme in 1961, 1963, and 1967. There was also a 1965 American television series based on the book and movies.

The name peaked in usage in the United States in 1968, when it was the eighth most popular name for newborn American girls. If spelling variants Tami, Tamie, Tammi and Tammie were combined with Tammy, the name would have been the fifth most popular name for American girls in 1968. The name remained well-used throughout the 1970s, 1980s and into the mid-1990s in the United States but has since declined in use. It has not been ranked among the top 1,000 names for girls born in the United States since 1998. It was also the 959th most popular name for boys born between 1960 and 1969 in the United States, but has not appeared among the top 1,000 names for boys there since the 1960s. Tammy was most well used in Australia from 1969 to 1981, in Canada from 1969 to 1982, and in England and Wales from 1996 to 2006.

== People ==
- Tammy Abraham (born 1997), English footballer
- Tammy Ader, American television writer, director and producer
- Tammy Alexander (1963–1979), American homicide victim found in the town of Caledonia, New York
- Tammy Armstrong (born 1974), Canadian poet and novelist
- Tammy Baldwin (born 1962), American politician serving as the junior United States senator from Wisconsin
- Tammy Barker, Canadian retired Paralympic swimmer
- Tammy Barr, American actress, model and voice over artist
- Tammy Barton (born 1978), Australian entrepreneur and the founder of MyBudget
- Tammy Beauchamp (1878–1947), born Thomas Beacham, Australian rules footballer
- Tammy Beaumont (born 1991), English cricketer
- Tammy Beauvais, Indigenous fashion designer from Kahnawake Mohawk Territory, Quebec, Canada
- Tammy Blanchard (born 1976), American actress
- Tammy Caputi, American politician
- Tammy Clarkson, Australian television actress
- Tammy Cleland (born 1975), American athlete in synchronized swimming
- Tammy Cole (born 1973), Australian female field hockey defender
- Tammy Daybell (died 2019), American murder victim
- Tammy Duckworth (born 1968), American politician and former U.S. Army lieutenant colonel who has served as the junior United States senator for Illinois
- Tammy Franks (born 1968), Australian politician, member of the South Australian Legislative Council
- Tammy Graham (born 1968), American country music artist
- Tammy Grimes (1934–2016), American actress and singer
- Tammy Homolka (1975–1990), the younger sister and homicide victim of Karla Homolka and her partner, Paul Bernardo
- Tammy Jackson (born 1962), American former college and professional basketball player
- Tammy Jones, stage name of Debbie D'Amato, professional wrestler from the Gorgeous Ladies of Wrestling
- Tammy Lau Nga-wun (born 1992), Hong Kong rugby union player
- Tammy Leitner (born 1972), American investigative TV reporter and reality television contestant
- Tammy Lynn Sytch, (born 1972), American professional wrestling valet, known for her time in the WWF during the mid 1990s as "Sunny"
- Tammy MacIntosh (born 1970), Australian actress
- Tammy McLeod (born 1977), Canadian boccia player
- Tammy Faye Bakker (1942–2007), American Christian singer, evangelist, author, talk show hostess, and television personality
- Tammy Ogston (born 1970), Australian football referee
- Tammy Pescatelli (born 1969), American stand-up comedian
- Tammy Schmersal-Burgess, American politician from Maine
- Tammy Sutton-Brown (born 1978), Canadian basketball player
- Tammy Tibbetts (born c. 1985), American non-profit organization founder
- Tammy Wynette (1942–1998), American country music singer-songwriter

== Fictional characters ==
- Tammy, in the animated series Rick and Morty
- Tammy, in the animated series The Ridonculous Race
- Reverend Tammy in the comedy show The Middle
- Tammy, a character in the film 1978 pornographic movie Debbie Does Dallas
- Tammy Banks, in the film Tammy
- Tammy Swanson (differentiated as Tammy I, Tammy II, and Tammy Zero), three characters in the American television series Parks and Recreation
- Tammy Tarleton, in the television series Tammy
- Tammy Larsen, in the animated series Bob's Burgers
- Tammy Taylor, a character in the 1981 American satirical black comedy movie S.O.B.
- Tambrey "Tammy" Tyree, in the Tammy film series

== See also ==
- Tammy (disambiguation)
- Tami (given name)
- Tammie
- Tammy Jo
