= Tammy =

Tammy may refer to:

== Arts and entertainment ==
- Tammy (film series), a series of four films about a protagonist named Tammy
  - "Tammy" (song), a popular song from the first film, Tammy and the Bachelor
  - Tammy (TV series), a 1965 U.S. television comedy based on the series
- Tammy (film), a 2014 American film
- Tammy (comics), a British comic that ran from 1971 to 1984
- Tammy (doll), a fashion doll created by the Ideal Toy Company in response to Mattel's Barbie doll

== Other uses ==
- Tammy (given name), including a list of people and fictional characters
- Tam o' shanter (cap), a Scottish hat
- Tammy (cloth), a woven fabric
- Tammy, a British girls' fashion store chain, purchased by and incorporated into British Home Stores after 2005
- List of storms named Tammy, tropical cyclones bearing the name Tammy

== See also ==
- The Tammys, a 1960s American girl group
- Tammi (disambiguation)
- Tami (disambiguation)
- Tamis
