= Tammi =

Tammi may refer to:

- Tammi (company), a Finnish publishing company
- Tammi (surname), a Finnish-language surname

== People with the given name ==
- Tammi Musumeci (born 1994), American submission grappler and Brazilian jiu-jitsu competitor
- Tammi Øst (born 1958), Danish actress
- Tammi Patterson (born 1990), Australian tennis player
- Tammi Piermarini (born 1967), American jockey
- Tammi Reiss (born 1970), American actress and basketball player
- Tammi Terrell (1945–1970), American singer
- Tammi Wilson (born 1973), New Zealand rugby union player

== See also ==
- Tammy (disambiguation)
- Tami (disambiguation)
- Tamme (disambiguation)
