= Tami =

Tami or TAMI may refer to:

== People and fictional characters ==
- Tami (given name), a list of people and fictional characters with either the given name or nickname
- Mark Tami (born 1962), British politician and Member of Parliament
- Pierluigi Tami (born 1961), Swiss retired footballer
- Tami (singer) (born 1964), or TAMI, American singer

== Other uses ==
- Tami (political party), a political party in Israel in the 1980s
- Tami language, a language of Papua New Guinea
- Tami Islands, Papua New Guinea
- Texas Archive of the Moving Image (TAMI)

== See also ==
- T.A.M.I. Show, a 1964 popular music concert film
- Tamme (disambiguation)
- Tammi (disambiguation)
- Tammy (disambiguation)
