= Tamara (given name) =

Feminine given name

- Pronunciation: /təˈmɑːrə, təˈmɛərə, ˈtæmərə/
- Gender: Feminine
- Language: Various

Origin
- Origin: Derived in Russian from the biblical name Tamar (Hebrew: תָּמָר) and spread to various other languages

Other names
- Alternative spelling: Tammara
- Variant forms: Tamra, Tamera, Thamara
- Short forms: English: Tammie, Tammy; Russian: Mara, Tama
- Pet name: Toma (Russian)

Tamara is a variant of the Hebrew feminine given name Tamar, a biblical name. (Note: There are three biblical women named Tamar: One is Tamar of the book of Genesis—daughter-in-law of Judah. Another is Tamar, daughter of David; she was raped by her half-brother Amnon, who was then killed by Absalom, her full brother. Absalom named his daughter also Tamar, described as a woman of great beauty.) The variant originated in the Russian language and spread into other languages through Russian. In Russia, where Tamara is associated with Queen Tamar of Georgia of Georgia, (Note: recognised by the Orthodox church as Saint Tamara the Right Believing) the name remains popular and frequently appears in Russian literature. It is also common in Central, Eastern, and Southeast European countries.

The name was formed through adding the Russian feminine suffix -a to Tamar (Hebrew: תָּמָר), which originated from the same generic noun for "date" (the fruit), "date palm" or just "palm tree". The derived Russian diminutive name is Toma, and its other shortened forms include Tama, Mara, Tata, and Tusya.

It first appeared in the English-speaking world in the 1930s and reached its peak in the 1970s. In the 1980s, it gained popularity among Black Americans. In the United States, the name was quite common from the late 1950s to mid-1990; more than 1,000 girls were named Tamara annually through 1996, with the highest numbers occurring in the 1970s. As of 2023, Tamara is relatively uncommon in the United States; in 2010, it dropped off the Top 1,000 Social Security Administration baby names list, with fewer than 250 instances recorded that year. Since the 1930s, Tamara has ranked among the top 320 most popular names in Australia, with peak popularity from the 1970s through the 1990s.

In the United Kingdom, it was the 137th most popular girl's name in 1997 but had dropped to 779th in 2021 when it was given to 47 babies. Cornish legends include a character named Tamara, associated with the River Tamar, whose name is of Celtic origin. (Note: In the Latin translation of Ptolemy's Geography, The Latin name of the Tamar is Tamarus, whereas one of the settlements on the river is named Tamara. Tamara occurs as a latinised name of the Tamar in John Milton's poem Epitaphium Damonis, the final of the Latin poems in his 1645 Poems collection.) According to Mabel Quiller-Couch's telling of the legend, Tamara was a sprite, the child of underground-living gnomes, who escaped to the earth's surface near Morwenstow and was turned into a river by her father when she refused to return underground, while the giants Tawridge and Tavy from Dartmoor, who fell in love with her, became the rivers Taw and Tavy. The Tamara Coast to Coast Way is an 87-mile (140 km) walking route following the river Tamar.

The name was also popular in Spain during the 1980s, possibly influenced by the daughter of Isabel Preysler and Carlos Falcó, Tamara Falcó.

== People named Tamara ==
Notable people with the given name Tamara include:

=== In the arts ===
- Tamara Abdushukurova (1940–2025), Tajikistani actress
- Tamara Acosta, Chilean actress
- Tamara Al-Gabbani, Emirati fashion designer
- Tamara Al Zool (born 2003), better known as Tära, Palestinian-Italian singer-songwriter
- Tamara Arciuch (born 1975), Polish actress
- Tamara Bleszynski (born 1974), Indonesian actress, singer, and model
- Tamara Braun (born 1971), American soap opera actress
- Tamara Brooks (1941–2012), American choral conductor
- Tamara Buciuceanu (1929–2019), Romanian actress
- Tamara Danz (1952–1996), German rock singer
- Tamara Degtyaryova (1944–2018), Russian stage, television and film actress
- Tamara Divíšková (born 1934), Czech ceramist and costume designer
- Tamara Dobson (1947–2006), African-American actress and model
- Tamara Dragičević (born 1989), Serbian actress and model
- Tamara Drasin (c. 1905 – 1943), Ukrainian-born singer-actress
- Tamara Feldman (born 1980), American actress
- Tamara Gorski, Canadian actress
- Tamara Gverdtsiteli (born 1962), Georgian-Russian singer, actress and composer
- Tamara Lindeman, also known by the name Tamara Hope, Canadian actress and musician
- Tamara Lisitsian (1923–2009), Soviet film director and screenwriter
- Tamara Jaber (born 1982), Lebanese-Australian singer and songwriter
- Tamara Jones (born 1987), stage name of Nigerian singer and actress Tamara Eteimo
- Tamara Johnson-George, American singer and rapper, and member of the R&B singing group Sisters with Voices
- Tamara Karsavina (1885–1978), Russian ballerina
- Tamara Kučan (born 1989), Serbian author
- Tamara Maria Kler, Swiss DJ known by her stage name Dinka
- Tamara de Lempicka (1894–1980), Polish art deco painter
- Tamara Natalie Madden (1975–2017), Jamaican-American painter
- Tamara Makarova (1907–1997), Russian-Soviet actress
- Tamara Marthe (born 1985), known as Shy'm, French singer
- Tamara Mello, American actress
- Tamara Podemski, Canadian film and television actress and writer
- Tamara Ralph (born 1981), Australian fashion designer
- Tamara Rey, Cuban American actress and writer
- Tamara Rojo, Spanish ballet dancer, artistic director of English National Ballet
- Tamara Salman, Iraqi-born designer
- Tamara Macarena Valcárcel Serrano, Spanish singer known as Tamara
- Tamara Sinyavskaya, Russian mezzo-soprano
- Tamara Sky, Puerto Rican DJ and model
- Tamara Smart (born 2005), English actress
- Tamara Taylor (born 1970), Canadian actress
- Tamara Todevska, Macedonian pop singer
- Tamara Toumanova (1919–1996), Georgian-Armenian ballerina and actress
- Tamara Tunie (born 1959), American actress
- Tamara Diane Wimer (born 1972), known as Isis Gee, American singer
- Tamara Witmer, American actress and model
- Tamara Živković, Montenegrin singer and flautist

=== Politicians and activists ===
- Tamara Adrián, Venezuelan politician
- Tamara van Ark, Dutch politician
- Tamara Bunke (1937–1967), Argentinian communist revolutionary
- Tamara Dávila (born c. 1981), Nicaraguan sociologist, feminist and political activist
- Tamara Duisenova (born 1965), Kazakh politician
- Tamara Frolova, Russian politician
- Tamara Grove, American politician
- Tamara Jansen, Canadian politician
- Tamara Kronis, Canadian politician
- Tamara Manukova (born 1953), Belarusian politician
- Tamara Mazzi, German politician
- Tamara Smith, Australian politician
- Tamara Stohlová (born 1989), Slovak politician
- Tamara Sujú, Venezuelan activist
- Tamara ten Hove, Dutch politician

=== Sportspeople ===
- Tamara Bolt (born 2003), Brazilian footballer
- Tamara Boroš (born 1977), Croatian table tennis player
- Tamara Bykova (born 1958), Soviet–Russian track and field athlete
- Tamara Čurović (born 1994), Serbian tennis player
- Tamāra Dauniene (born 1951), Soviet–Latvian Olympic basketball player
- Tamara Dorofejev (born 1984), Hungarian figure skater
- Tamara Dronova (born 1993), Russian cyclist
- Támara Echegoyen (born 1984), Spanish sailor
- Tamara Giaquinto (born 2002), Canadian ice hockey player
- Tamara Gómez Garrido (born 1991), Spanish professional triathlete
- Tamara Horacek (born 1995), Croatian-born French Olympic handball player
- Tamara Johnson-George (born 1971), American indoor volleyball player
- Tamara Larrea (born 1973), Cuban beach volleyball player
- Tamara McKinney (born 1962), American skier
- Tamara Metal (1933–2022), Israeli Olympic high jumper and long jumper, and captain of the Israel women's national basketball team
- Tamara Morávková (born 2003), Slovak footballer
- Tamara Moskvina (born 1941), Soviet–Russian skater and pairs figure skating coach
- Tamara Nowitzki (born 1976), Paralympic swimming competitor from Australia
- Tamara Podpalnaya (born 1972), Russian Paralympic powerlifter
- Tamara Polyakova (born 1960), Soviet–Ukrainian cyclist
- Tamara Radočaj (born 1987), Serbian basketball player
- Tamara Radojević (born 1992), Serbian handball player
- Tamara Reeves (born 1982), South African cricketer
- Tamara Safonova (born 1946), Soviet–Russian Olympic diver
- Tamara Salaški (born 1988), Serbian sprinter
- Tamara Sivakova (born 1965), Belarusian Paralympic athlete
- Tamara Stocks (born 1979), American basketball player
- Tamara Takács (born 1996), Hungarian canoeist
- Tamara Téglássy (born 1968), Hungarian figure skater
- Tamara Tikhonova (born 1964), Soviet–Russian cross-country skier
- Tamara Tyshkevich (1931–1997), Soviet shot putter
- Tamara Yerofeeva (born 1982), Ukrainian Olympic rhythmic gymnast
- Tamara Zamotaylova (born 1939), Soviet–Russian Olympic gymnast, and gymnastics coach and referee
- Tamara Zidanšek (born 1997), Slovenian tennis player

=== Others ===
- Tamara Beckwith (born 1970), English socialite
- Tamara Ecclestone (born 1984), English-Serbian socialite, television personality and model
- Tamara Falcó (born 1981), Spanish aristocrat, socialite and television personality
- Tamara Finkelstein (born 1967), British civil servant
- Tamara Griesser Pečar (born 1947), Slovenian historian
- Tamara Oleksiyivna Grinchenko (born 1938), Ukrainian computer scientist
- Kera Tamara (c. 1340 – c. 1389), known as Tamara Hejtan, Bulgarian princess
- Tamara E. Jernigan (born 1959), American astrophysicist and NASA astronaut
- Tamara Levitt (born 1971), Canadian author, mindfulness instructor, and voice-over artist
- Tamara Mellon (born 1967), British fashion entrepreneur, president and founder of shoes company Jimmy Choo
- Tammy Faye Bakker (1942–2007), American televangelist and reality TV star
- Tamara Mkheidze (1915–2007), Georgian arachnologist
- Tamara Gräfin von Nayhauß (born 1972), German television presenter
- Tamara Pamyatnykh (1919–2012), Soviet fighter pilot during the Second World War
- Tamara Samsonova (born 1947), Russian murderer and suspected serial killer
- Tamara Sher (born 1962), American psychologist
