= Thomasina =

Thomasina, Thomasine, or Thomasena is the feminine form of the given name Thomas, which means "twin". Thomasina is often shortened to Tamsin. Tamsin can be used as a name in itself; variants of Tamsin include Tamsyn, Tamzin, Tamsen, Tamzen, Tammi, Tamzie and Tamasin. The version "Tamsin" is especially popular in Cornwall and Wales. Along with Tamara it is the ancestor of "Tammy".

== People named Thomasina (and variants) ==
=== Tammi ===
- Tammi Patterson (born 1990), Australian tennis player
- Tammi Terrell (1945–1970), American recording artist

=== Tammie ===
- Tammie Jo Shults (born 1961), American commercial airline captain, author, and retired naval aviator

=== Tamsen ===
- Tamsen Donner (1801–1847), third wife of George Donner of the Donner Party
- Tamsen Fadal (born 1970), American journalist, news anchor, author and host/executive producer
- Tamsen McGarry (born 1982), Irish alpine skier
- Emil Tamsen (1862–1957), South African philatelist

=== Tamsin ===
- Tamsin Blanchard, British fashion journalist
- Tamsin Carroll (born 1979), Australian actress
- Tamsin Cook (born 1998), Australian swimmer
- Tamsin Dunwoody (born 1958), sometimes known as Tamsin Dunwoody-Kneafsey, British politician
- Tamsin Edwards, British climate scientist
- Tamsin Egerton (born 1988), British actress
- Tamsin Ford (born 1966), British psychiatrist specialising in children's mental health
- Tamsin Greenway (born 1982), English netball player
- Tamsin Greig (born 1966), British actress
- Tamsin Heatley, British actress and voice artist
- Tamsin Hinchley (born 1980), Australian volleyball player
- Tamsin Mather (born 1976), British Professor of Earth Sciences
- Tamsin Pickeral (born 1971), British author and art historian
- Tamsin West (born 1974), Australian actress and singer

=== Tamsyn ===
- Tamsyn Challenger, Cornish artist
- Dame Tamsyn Imison (1937–2017), British educator
- Tamsyn Leevey (born 1978) New Zealand squash player
- Tamsyn Manou (born 1978), Australian athlete and middle-distance runner
- Tamsyn Muir, New Zealand author of fantasy, science fiction and horror genres
- Oona Tamsyn King, Baroness King of Bow (born 1967), British Labour politician

=== Tamzin ===
- Tamzin Malleson (born 1974), British actress
- Tamzin Merchant (born 1987), British actress
- Tamzin Outhwaite (born 1970), British actress
- Tamzin Thomas (born 1997), South African sprinter

=== Thomasin ===
- Thomasin von Zirclaere or Tommasino Di Cerclaria (c.1186–c.1235), Italian Middle High German lyric poet.
- Thomasin McKenzie (born 2000), New Zealand actress

=== Thomasina ===
- Thomasina Jordan (?–1999), American Indian activist who became the first American Indian to serve in the United States Electoral College
- Thomasina Miers (born 1976), British chef
- Thomasina Pidgeon (born 1975), Canadian rock climber
- Thomasina Winslow (1965–2023), American blues musician
- Thomazina Muliercula (died 1603), English jester at the court of Elizabeth I

=== Thomasine ===
- Thomasine Christine Gyllembourg-Ehrensvärd (1773–1856), Danish author
- Thomasine, Lady Percival (c. 1470–c. 1530), Cornish benefactress
- Thomas(ine) Hall (c. 1603–after 1629), an intersex individual in British America
- Margrethe Marie Thomasine Numsen (1705–1776), Danish courtier

== Fictional Thomasinas ==
- Beatrix Potter's Thomasina Tittlemouse
- Tamsin Yeobright from The Return of the Native by Thomas Hardy. Her name is given alternately as Tamsin or Thomasin throughout the book
- Thomasina, the feline heroine of the 1957 book Thomasina: The Cat Who Thought She Was God by Paul Gallico and The Three Lives of Thomasina, a 1964 Disney film based on the book
- Thomasina, a character in Tom Stoppard's Arcadia
- Thomasina, a character in the television series Kings
- "Thomasina", a song by The Besnard Lakes
- Tamsin, a character in the television series Lost Girl
- Thomasin, a character in Robert Eggers' 2015 film The Witch
- Tamasin Reedbourne, a character in C. J. Sansom's Shardlake book series
- Thomasina Tuckerton, a character in Agatha Christie's The Pale Horse

== Similar names ==
- Thomas
- Tammy
- Tamara
- Tamar
- Tasmin
- Tazmin
