= Tamsin =

Tamsin is a short form of Thomasina.

== Persons ==
- Tamsin (given name)

== Characters ==
- Tamsin, a character in the Canadian television series Lost Girl
- Tamsin Yeobright from The Return of the Native by Thomas Hardy. Her name is given alternately as Tamsin or Thomasin throughout the book.
- Tamsin Drew, companion in the Doctor Who audio dramas.
- Tamsin, character in Return of the Indian In The Cupboard

== Others ==
- Tamsin (novel), a 1999 fantasy novel by Peter S. Beagle

== See also ==
- Tamzin
- Tasmin
- Tazmin
