= Tamminen =

Tamminen is a Finnish surname of Virtanen type derived from the word "tammi", 'oak'. Notable people with the surname include:

- Anna Tamminen (born 1994), Finnish footballer
- Eero Tamminen (born 1995), Finnish footballer
- Henri Tamminen (born 1993), Finnish ice hockey player
- Juhani Tamminen (born 1950), Finnish ice hockey player
- Kauko Tamminen (1920–1989), Finnish politician
- Laura Tamminen, Finnish speed skater
- Lauri Tamminen (1919–2010), Finnish hammer thrower
- Noora Tamminen (born 1990), Finnish professional golfer
- Roope Tamminen, Finnish game developer
- Taavi Tamminen (1889–1967), Finnish sport wrestler
- Terry Tamminen (born 1952), American writer

== Fictional characters ==
Eva, Nadja, Nella Tamminen in the television series Salatut elämät ["Secret Lives"]

== See also ==
- Tammi, the corresponding surname of Laine type
