= The Munsters in film =

American film series

Several movies based on The Munsters have been released, three featuring original cast members.

== Munster, Go Home! (1966) ==
The Munsters go to England to claim Munster Hall after the death of an old relative. The film starred the original black & white series's cast, with the exception of Pat Priest who was replaced by Universal Pictures by its teenage contract player Debbie Watson. Priest commented in the A&E Biography documentary produced on The Munsters by the A&E (Arts and Entertainment) cable TV network, that she was devastated at the producers' decision not to include the then-29-year-old actress. The film gave fans a chance to see the Munsters in color during their original 1960s era run for the first and only time. The film also featured the famous "DRAG-U-LA" souped up dragster/hot rod Munsters car. As of 2020, this film has been released on DVD and Blu-ray and streaming services.

== The Mini-Munsters (1973) ==
A one-hour animated TV-movie that was part of The ABC Saturday Superstar Movie ran on the Saturday Morning circuit. Al Lewis provided the voice of Grandpa. As of 2020, this film has yet to be released on official home media but is available on streaming services.

== The Munsters' Revenge (1981) ==
A made-for-TV movie. The owner of a wax museum creates robots of Herman and Grandpa and uses them as part of a plot to rob a traveling Egyptian antiquities exhibit. Gwynne, De Carlo, and Lewis recreated their roles, but Eddie and Marilyn were played by K.C. Martel and Jo McDonnell respectively. As of 2020, this film has been released on DVD and Blu-ray and streaming services.

== Here Come the Munsters (1995) ==
Another made-for-TV movie. The family searches for Herman's brother-in-law Norman Hyde, only to find out that he has unknowingly turned himself into Brent Jekyll, who is running for Congress. An all-new cast now plays the main characters (see chart below), although the film features a cameo scene of De Carlo, Lewis, Priest, and Patrick (Gwynne died in 1993) as a bickering family in a restaurant who were served by (the new) Herman Munster who was a waiter. Herman Munster is played by actor Edward Herrmann. It has been released on VHS but is out of print and hard to find. This film was released on DVD, but only for region 2, and on streaming services.

== The Munsters' Scary Little Christmas (1996) ==
Grandpa has accidentally captured Santa Claus and two of his elves, while Lily is trying to win the local neighborhood Christmas home decorating competition. Meanwhile, Marilyn has invited family and friends from the "old country" to stay for Christmas. Despite being released only a year after Here Come the Munsters, the film features an entirely different cast. This film has been released on DVD and streaming services.

== The Munsters (2022) ==
In 2021, Rob Zombie was hired to write and direct a Munsters movie. In October 2021, Zombie released a photo confirming some of the cast being that of Jeff Daniel Phillips (Herman Munster), Sheri Moon Zombie (Lily Munster) and Dan Roebuck (The Count). The film was released on DVD, Blu-ray, and digital formats on September 27, 2022, and also available to stream on Netflix.

== Cast ==
Film	Year	Character				
Film	Year	Herman Munster	Lily Munster	Grandpa / The Count	Eddie Munster	Marilyn Munster
Munster, Go Home!	1966	Fred Gwynne	Yvonne De Carlo	Al Lewis	Butch Patrick	Debbie Watson
The Mini-Munsters (animated, voices only)	1973	Richard Long	Cynthia Adler	Al Lewis	Bobby Diamond	
The Munsters' Revenge	1981	Fred Gwynne	Yvonne De Carlo	Al Lewis	K. C. Martel	Jo McDonnell
Here Come the Munsters	1995	Edward Herrmann	Veronica Hamel	Robert Morse	Mathew Botuchis	Christine Taylor
The Munsters' Scary Little Christmas	1996	Sam McMurray	Ann Magnuson	Sandy Baron	Bug Hall	Elaine Hendrix
The Munsters	2022	Jeff Daniel Phillips	Sheri Moon Zombie	Dan Roebuck		
