= Tami (given name) =

Tami is a usually feminine given name and nickname. Notable people with the name include:

== People ==
=== Female ===
- Tami (singer) (born 1964), American singer
- Tami Oldham Ashcraft, American sailor and author
- Tami Bond (born 1963 or 1964), professor of Civil and Environmental Engineering at the University of Illinois, and affiliate professor of Atmospheric Science
- Tami Bruce (born 1967), American former swimmer
- Tami Chynn (born 1984), stage name of Jamaican singer, songwriter, and dancer Tammar Anika Chin
- Tami Erin (born 1974), American actress and model born Tamara Erin Klicman
- Tami Farrell (born 1984), Miss Teen USA 2003 and Miss California USA 2009
- Tami Gold, American documentary filmmaker, visual artist and educator
- Tami Green, 21st century American politician
- Tami Grende (born 1997), Indonesian tennis player
- Tami Hetke (born 1960), American paracanoeist
- Tami Hoag (born 1959), American romance and thriller novelist
- Tami Katz-Freiman (born 1955), Israeli art historian, curator and critic
- Tami Lane (born 1974), American Oscar-winning makeup artist
- Tami Lynn (1939–2020), American soul singer
- Tami Maida, first known high school quarterback and homecoming queen in 1981
- Tami Monroe (born 1970), American former pornographic actress
- Tami Neilson, member of The Neilsons Canadian country music group
- Tami Reiker (fl. 1995-present), American cinematographer
- Tami Sagher, American television comedy writer
- Tami Stronach (born 1972), Israeli-American dancer and choreographer
- Tami Whitlinger (born 1968), American former tennis player
- Tami Wiencek, American politician, member of the Iowa House of Representatives from 2007 to 2009
- Tami Zawistowski, American politician elected to the Connecticut House of Representatives in 2014

=== Male ===
- Tami Kiuru (born 1976), Finnish retired ski jumper
- Tami Mauriello (1923–1999), American boxer and actor

== Fictional characters ==
- Tami Taylor, a character on Friday Night Lights

== See also ==
- Tammy (given name)
