= Tamm (disambiguation) =

Tamm is a municipality in the district of Ludwigsburg, Baden-Württemberg, Germany.

Tamm may also refer to:

- Tamms, Illinois, a village in Alexander County, Illinois, United States
- Clayton/Tamm, St. Louis, a neighborhood in St. Louis, Missouri, United States
- Tamm (crater), a lunar crater
- Tamm (surname)

== See also ==
- Tamme (disambiguation)
