= Tamera (name) =

Tamera is a variation of the female given name Tamara. Notable individuals with that name include:

- Tamera Alexander (born 1961), American author
- Tamera Foster (born 1997), English singer
- Tamera Mowry (born 1978), American actress
  - Tamera Campbell, the character she played in Sister, Sister
- Tamera Szijarto, Filipina beauty queen, actress, and entrepreneur
- Tamera Young (born 1986), American basketball player

== See also ==
- Tamera
