= Ray Evans =

American songwriter (1915–2007)

Background information
- Born: Raymond Bernard Evans; February 4, 1915; Salamanca, New York, United States
- Died: February 15, 2007 (aged 92) Los Angeles, California, United States
- Genre: film music
- Occupation: Lyricist
- Years active: 1937-2001
- Formerly of: songwriting duo with Jay Livingston

Raymond Bernard Evans (February 4, 1915 – February 15, 2007) was an American songwriter best known for being a half of a composing-songwriting duo with Jay Livingston, specializing himself in writing lyrics for film songs. On music Livingston composed, Evans wrote the lyrics.

== Biography ==
=== Early life and family ===
Ray Evans was born on February 4, 1915, to a Jewish family in Salamanca, New York, United States.

=== Career ===
Evans was valedictorian of his high school class, where he played clarinet in the band. The Salamanca High School yearbook from 1931 states: "His original themes and brilliant oral talks are the despair of his classmates. Ray's quite a humorist, too. At times, his satire is positively killing." He received a bachelor's degree in Economics from the University of Pennsylvania's Wharton School in 1936, writing a senior thesis on "The relation between the central bank, member banks and the money market".

In 1934, Evans met Jay Livingston while a student at Penn. Together they played in the university's college dance orchestra, "The Continentals". During school vacations the orchestra was engaged to play on several international cruises. After graduation the duo continued their partnership, seeking a career as a song-writing team in New York and later Hollywood. Their first big break came after auditioning for comedians Ole Olsen and Chic Johnson in 1939. Their song "G'bye Now" made it into Olsen and Johnson's Broadway revue Hellzapoppin'. In 1946, Livingston and Evans signed a contract with Paramount Studios in Hollywood.

Livingston and Evans did not hit the top until 1946, when they set the music publishing business on fire with "To Each His Own", which reached number one on the Billboard charts for three different artists, and occupied the top five positions on the "Most Played On the Air" chart for four different weeks (August 24, 1946, and again on September 7, September 14 and October 5, five versions appeared simultaneously in the Top Ten). "Buttons and Bows" (1947) was their next multi-million seller, written for the movie The Paleface, with four artists reaching the top ten in 1948. For that song, the duo earned their first major award, the Academy Award for Best Song. They finished off the decade with 1949's "Mona Lisa", written for the movie Captain Carey, U.S.A., in which it was performed by Sergio de Karlo. "Mona Lisa" was a chart hit for seven popular and two country artists in 1950, sold a million for Nat King Cole, and won the pair another Oscar for Best Song.

Livingston and Evans, both members of ASCAP, won their third Academy Award for the song "Que Sera Sera", featured in the Alfred Hitchcock movie The Man Who Knew Too Much and sung by Doris Day. Another popular song that he and Livingston wrote for a film was the song "Tammy", written for the 1957 movie Tammy and the Bachelor. The song was nominated for an Academy Award for Best Song. Livingston and Evans also wrote popular TV themes for shows including Bonanza and Mr. Ed.

Despite initial doubt on their part that the song would be commercially successful, their Christmas song "Silver Bells", intended for the 1951 Bob Hope film The Lemon Drop Kid, has become a Christmas standard.

Evans appeared as himself with Livingston in the film Sunset Boulevard in the New Year's Eve party scene.

In 1958, the song-writing team was nominated for a Tony Award for the musical Oh, Captain!. Evans also collaborated separately with Michael Feinstein, Henry Mancini, Max Steiner, and Victor Young. The song "Dear Heart" from the 1964 film of the same name was written by Livingston and Evans with Henry Mancini; it was nominated for an Oscar and for the Song of the Year Grammy Award, and was recorded multiple times, charting for Andy Williams, Jack Jones, and Henry Mancini.

=== Death ===
He died aged 92 in Los Angeles, California, on the 42nd anniversary of the death of Nat King Cole, who had made "Mona Lisa" so famous. Evans was married for nearly 56 years to actress, writer, and playwright Wyn Ritchie Evans. His legacy is maintained and developed by the Ray and Wyn Ritchie Evans Foundation in Culver City, California. The Ray Evans Seneca Theater in his hometown of Salamanca, NY, is named after him.

== Legacy ==
Evans is an inductee in the Songwriters Hall of Fame. He and Livingston have a star on the Hollywood Walk of Fame.

== Works ==
Ray Evans wrote more than 700 songs for screen, stage, and television. Most were composed with writing partner Jay Livingston.

=== Works on Screen ===
Date	Movie	Production	Song
1941	Secrets of a Co-Ed	Producers Releasing Corporation (PRC)	Brazilly Willy
1944	I Accuse My Parents	Producers Releasing Corporation (PRC)	Are You Happy In Your Work?; Love Came Between Us; Where Can You Be?
1944	Swing Hostess	Producers Releasing Corporation (PRC)	I'll Eat My Hat; I've Got An Invitation; Let's Capture This Moment; Music To My Ears; Say It With Love; Swing Hostess; The Highway Polka
1944	Why Girls Leave Home	Producers Releasing Corporation (PRC)	Call Me; The Cat and The Canary; What Am I Sayin'?
1945	Crime, Inc.	Producers Releasing Corporation (PRC)	I'm Guilty; Lonely Little Camera Girl
1945	Kitty	Paramount Pictures	Kitty
1945	People Are Funny	Paramount Pictures	Hey Jose
1945	The Stork Club	Paramount Pictures	A Square In The Social Circle
1946	Double Rhythm	Paramount Pictures	Have The Last Kiss On Me
1946	Monsieur Beaucaire	Paramount Pictures	A Coach and Four; Warm As Wine; We'll Drink Every Drop In The Shop
1946	My Favorite Brunette	Paramount Pictures	Beside You; My Favorite Brunette
1946	To Each His Own	Paramount Pictures	To Each His Own
1947	Champagne For Two	Paramount Pictures	Ho! Ho! Jose!
1947	Dream Girl	Paramount Pictures	Dream Girl; Drunk with Love
1947	Easy Come, Easy Go	Paramount Pictures	Easy Come, Easy Go
1947	Golden Earrings	Paramount Pictures	Golden Earrings
1947	Paris In The Spring	Paramount Pictures	At The Carnival
1947	Smooth Sailing	Paramount Pictures	Great Feeling
1947	The Big Clock	Paramount Pictures	The Big Clock
1947	The Imperfect Lady	Paramount Pictures	Piccadilly Tilly
1947	Whispering Smith	Paramount Pictures	Laramie
1948	Beyond Glory	Paramount Pictures	Beyond Glory
1948	Catalina Interlude	Paramount Pictures	Catalina
1948	Isn't It Romantic?	Paramount Pictures	At The Nickelodeon; I Shoulda Quit When I Was Ahead; I Think of You; Indiana Dinner; Miss Julie July; Wonderin' When
1948	Sorrowful Jones	Paramount Pictures	Havin' A Wonderful Wish (Time You Were Here); Rock-a-Bye Bangtail
1948	Speed to Spare	Pine-Thomas Productions-Paramount Pictures	Golden Earrings
1948	The Paleface	Paramount Pictures	Buttons and Bows; Meetcha 'Round The Corner
1949	Bride of Vengeance	Paramount Pictures	Give My Love; Give Thy Love; The Wine of Old Giuseppe
1949	Copper Canyon	Paramount Pictures	Copper Canyon
1949	Dear Wife	Paramount Pictures	Dear Wife; Havin' A Wonderful Wish (Time You Were Here); My Own True Love
1949	My Friend Irma	Paramount Pictures	Here's To Love; Just For Fun; My Friend Irma; My Own, My Only, My All
1949	Paid In Full	Paramount Pictures	You're Wonderful
1949	Song of Surrender	Paramount Pictures	Song of Surrender
1949	Streets of Laredo	Paramount Pictures	The Streets of Laredo
1949	Sunset Blvd.	Paramount Pictures	Buttons and Bows; The Paramount Don't Want Me Blues
1949	The Great Lover	Paramount Pictures	A Thousand Violins; Lucky Us
1949	The Heiress	Paramount Pictures	My Love Loves Me
1950	Ace In The Hole	Paramount Pictures	We're Coming Leo
1950	Captain Carey, U.S.A.	Paramount Pictures	Mona Lisa
1950	Fancy Pants	Paramount Pictures	Fancy Pants; Home Cookin'
1950	Lucy Gallant	Paramount Pictures	How Can I Tell Her?
1950	My Friend Irma Goes West	Paramount Pictures	Baby, Obey Me!; I'll Always Love You (Day After Day); Singing a Vagabond Song; The Fiddle and Gittar Band
1950	No Man of Her Own	Paramount Pictures	The Lie
1950	Samson and Delilah	Paramount Pictures	The Song of Delilah
1950	The Furies	Paramount Pictures	T.C. Round-Up Time
1950	The Redhead and the Cowboy	Paramount Pictures	Trav'lin' Free
1951	Aaron Slick from Punkin Crick	Paramount Pictures	Chores; I'd Like To Baby You; Life Is A Beautiful Thing; Marshmallow Moon; My Beloved; Purt' Nigh, But Not Plumb; Saturday Night In Punkin Crick; Soda Shop; Step Right Up; Still Water; The Spider and the Fly; Why Should I Believe In Love?; Will You Be At Home In Heaven?
1951	Anything Can Happen	Paramount Pictures	Love Laughs At Kings
1951	Crosswinds	Paramount Pictures	Crosswinds
1951	Here Comes The Groom	Paramount Pictures	Bonne Nuit; Here Comes The Groom; Misto Cristofo Columbo; Your Own Little House
1951	My Favorite Spy	Paramount Pictures	Just A Moment More
1951	Rhubarb	Paramount Pictures	Friendly Finance Company; It's A Priv'lege To Live In Brooklyn
1951	Sangaree	Pine Thomas Productions-Paramount Pictures	Sangaree
1951	Somebody Loves Me	Paramount Pictures	Honey, Oh, My Honey; Love Her!; Love Him!; Thanks To You
1951	Son of Paleface	Paramount Pictures	California Rose; What A Dirty Shame; Wing-Ding Tonight
1951	That's My Boy	Paramount Pictures	Ridgeville Fight Song
1951	The Lemon Drop Kid	Paramount Pictures	It Doesn't Cost A Dime To Dream; Silver Bells; They Obviously Want Me To Sing
1951	When Worlds Collide	Paramount Pictures	When Worlds Collide
1952	Houdini	Paramount Pictures	The Golden Years
1952	Off Limits	Paramount Pictures	All About Love; Right or Wrong; The Military Policeman
1952	The Stars Are Singing	Paramount Pictures	Haven't Got A Worry; I Do! I Do! I Do!; I Don't See What You See In Me; Lovely Weather For Ducks; My Heart Is Home; My Kind of Day; Woof
1952	Those Redheads from Seattle	Paramount Pictures	Mister Banjo Man
1952	Thunder In The East	Paramount Pictures	The Ruby and the Pearl
1952	What Price Glory	20th Century Fox	All My Love; My Love, My Life; You and Me Together
1953	Here Come The Girls	Paramount Pictures	Ali Baba; Don't Take My Heart; Girls!; Heavenly Days; Here Come The Girls; It's Torment; Never So Beautiful; See The Circus; When You Love Someone; Ya Got Class!
1953	Red Garters	Paramount Pictures	A Dime and a Dollar; Bad News; Brave Man; Ginger Pete; Good Intentions; Lady Killer; Let Me Love You; Man and Woman; Meet A Happy Guy; Red Garters; The Robin Randall Song; This Is Greater Than I Thought; Vaquero!
1954	Casanova's Big Night	Paramount Pictures	Pretty Mandolin
1954	Mister Roberts	Warner Bros.	Let Me Hear You Whisper
1954	Sabrina	Paramount Pictures	Dream Girl
1954	Three Ring Circus	Paramount Pictures	Hey, Punchinello
1955	Raw Wind in Eden	Universal International Pictures	The Magic Touch
1955	The Man Who Knew Too Much	Paramount Pictures	Holy Cow; Que Sera, Sera (Whatever Will Be, Will Be); We'll Love Again
1955	The Second Greatest Sex	Universal International Pictures	The Second Greatest Sex
1956	Istanbul	Universal International Pictures	I Was A Little Too Lonely (And You Were A Little Too Late)
1956	Tammy and the Bachelor	Universal International Pictures	French Heels; Tammy
1956	The Mole People	Universal International Pictures	The Mole People
1956	The Scarlet Hour	Paramount Pictures	Never Let Me Go
1957	Omar Khayyam	Paramount Pictures	Tell My Love; The Loves of Omar Khayyam
1957	Saddle the Wind	MGM	Saddle the Wind
1957	The James Dean Story	Warner Bros.	Let Me Be Loved
1957	This Happy Feeling	Universal International Pictures	This Happy Feeling
1958	Another Time Another Place	Paramount Pictures	Another Time Another Place
1958	Girls On The Loose	Universal Pictures	I Was A Little Too Lonely (And You Were A Little Too Late)
1958	Houseboat	Paramount Pictures	Almost In Your Arms; Bing! Bang! Bong!
1958	Once Upon A Horse	Universal International Pictures	Once Upon A Horse
1958	The Big Beat	Universal International Pictures	As I Love You
1958	Vertigo	Paramount Pictures	Vertigo
1959	A Private's Affair	20th Century Fox	36-24-36; If You're Willing to Be Mine; Love Is A Private Affair; The Same Old Army; Warm and Willing
1959	The Blue Angel	20th Century Fox	Lola-Lola
1959	Take a Giant Step	United Artists	Take a Giant Step
1960	All Hands On Deck	20th Century Fox	All Hands On Deck; I Got It Made; Little Friend; Somewhere There's Home; There's No One Like You; You Mean Everything To Me
1961	The Two Little Bears	20th Century Fox	Honey Bear
1961	Too Late Blues	Paramount Pictures	Free; How Shall We Begin?; Love Is Mardis Gras; Moonlight In Mexico; More and More Amor; Take Your Time; That's Loneliness; Those Bad Old Days; Three Dollar Bill
1962	Krazy Kat	King Features-Paramount	Kolin Kelly; Krazy Kat; Mrs. Kwakk-Kwakk; Offissa Pup
1962	Wait Until Dark	Warner Bros.	Wait Until Dark
1964	Dear Heart	Warner Bros.	Dear Heart
1964	Tammy and the Doctor	Universal Pictures	Tammy
1964	Those Calloways	Walt Disney	Angel
1964	Youngblood Hawke	Warner Bros.	On My Way (The Youngblood Hawke theme)
1965	Charade	Universal Pictures	Punch and Judy
1965	Harlow	Paramount Pictures	Lonely Girl
1965	Never Too Late	Paramount Pictures	Never Too Late
1965	The Night of the Grizzly	Paramount Pictures	Angela
1965	The Third Day	Warner Bros.	Love Me Now
1966	Arabesque	Universal Pictures	We've Loved Before
1966	Is Paris Burning?	Paramount Pictures	Paris Smiles
1966	The Oscar	Embassy Pictures	Maybe September; The Glass Mountain
1966	This Property is Condemned	Paramount Pictures	Wish Me A Rainbow
1966	Torn Curtain	Universal International Pictures	The Green Years
1966	What Did You Do in the War, Daddy?	United Artists	In the Arms of Love
1976	The Far Side of Paradise	New World Pictures	Foxtrot
1976	W.C. Fields and Me	Universal International Pictures	The Joke's On Me
1984	The Secret Diary of Sigmund Freud	20th Century Fox	Angel In The Night
1986	Mona Lisa	Handmade Film and Palace Productions	Mona Lisa

=== Works on Stage ===
Date	Musical	Production	Song
1940	Hellzapoppin'	Olsen and Johnson	Bounce; G'bye Now; My Heart's On Ice; My Heartzapoppin'; The Window Wiper Song
1941	Sons o' Fun	Olsen and Johnson	Additional Music by Jay Levinson and Ray Evans
1942	New Hellzapoppin' of 1943	Olsen and Johnson	Hellzapoppin' Polka
1951	I Love Lydia	Players Ring, Hollywood, California	Gee, It's Gonna Be Wonderful; Give The Little Girls A Great Big Hand; I Love Lydia; I Was Waiting for You; I Wouldn't Have Had To; Let Me Put It This Way; Leçon de danse; My Most Delectable Dream; One Last Fling; Riviera; The Order of the Garter; Viva La Buck; Viva La Duel
1954	Oh, Captain!	Alvin Theatre	A Very Proper Town; All Over Again; All The Time; Anywhere But Here; Captain Henry St. James; Double Standard; Femininity; Give It All You Got; Hey, Madame; I've Been There (And I'm Back); It's Never Quite The Same; Life Does A Man A Favor; Love Is Hell; Oh Captain Prologue; Oh Captain! (Overture); Surprise; The Morning Music of Montmartre; Three Paradises; We're Not Children; You Don't Know Him; You're So Right For Me
1954	That's Life	Los Angeles Revue	Chihuahua Choo-Choo; Clink, Clank, Clunk; The Livin' Lovin' Doll
1961	Let It Ride	Eugene O'Neill Theater	Broads Ain't People; Ev'rything Beautiful; Happy Birthday Erwin!; He Needs You; Hey Jimmy Joe John Jim Jack; His Own Little Island; I Wouldn't Have Had To; I Wouldn't Settle for Less; I'll Learn Ya; If Flutterby Wins; It Just Didn't Happen That Way; Just An Honest Mistake; Let It Ride!; Love, Let Me Know; Run! Run! Run!; The Best Undressed Girl In Town; The Nicest Thing; There's Something About A Horse; Who's Doing What To Erwin?; You're The Nicest Thing
1976	Kentucky Lucky	Unproduced	Any Other Way; Country Mornin' Young; East To Asheville, South To Atlanta; Firin' Up The Seminole Express; Kentucky Lucky; Put It In A Box; The Female He-Male Hoedown Song; The Single Girl; This Is Home
1979	Sugar Babies	Mark Hellinger Theatre	Sugar Baby Bounce; Warm and Willing
1984	The Italian Look	Unproduced	Afternoon In Athens; All About Women; Cara Mia; It's In To Be In; Just As You Are; Kind O' Nice; Look-A-Here Joe; See Ya, Love Ya; The Four Generals; The Garbage Disposal; The Italian Look (Finale); Viva La Difference
1984	West of East	Unproduced	Almost In Love; Broken Promises; That's What I'm Afraid Of; The Day After Tomorrow; West of East; What Am I Afraid Of; Wild West Showing
1987	The Red Parasol	Unproduced	Bon! Bon! Bon!; It Just Didn't Happen That Way; Tango For Lechers; The Natives Are Restless Tonight; The Red Parasol; The Story; Yes
1987	What Fools These Mortals Be	Unproduced	Brotherhood; It's A Miracle; Let's Be Lovers; Let's Paint The Whole World With Love; Love Is Blind; Lysander Loves Hermia, Helena Loves Demetrius; Unfair!
1988	The Odyssey of Runyon Jones	Valley Music Theater	Don't Brother Me; I Gave You A River; I Got A Plan; Law and Order; Old Gypsy Man; Pootsy; The Book of Regulations; The Odyssey of Runyon Jones; What Is A Dog?; What Is A Robot?
1990	The Passions of Perichole	Unproduced	As The Bird Flies; But I Miss Him; For The Man I Love; I Need Your Love; I'll Make Every Moment Me; Mother Earth; Soul Music; That's Where I Belong; The Battle Hymn of Him And Her; The Poor Proud People of Peru; The World Belongs To Me; What Can I Do That's New; What Has She Got

=== Works on Television ===
Date	Show	Production	Song
1954	Satins And Spurs	NBC	Back Home; I've Had Enough; Nobody Cares; Satins and Spurs; The Little Rock Roll; Whoop Diddy Ay; Wildcat Smathers; You're So Right For Me
1956	The Dinah Shore Chevy Show	NBC	Anniversary Rose
1958	Peter Gunn	NBC	Bye, Bye; Dreamsville; Straight To Baby
1959	Bonanza	NBC	Bonanza; My Sons, My Sons
1959	Mr. Lucky	CBS	Mr. Lucky
1959	The Chevy Show	NBC	That Ain't Right
1959	General Electric Theater	MCA-TV	I Heard; One Hand Tied Behind My Back
1960	Mister Ed	CBS	Anonymous; Fiddle Foot; Mister Ed
1965	Tammy	ABC	Tammy
1970	To Rome With Love	CBS	To Rome With Love
1977	The Busters: Ransom for Alice	NBC	A Dude And A Doll
1979	A Family Circus Christmas	Cullen-Kasdan Productions	The Dreamer
1988	Bonanza: The Next Generation	NBC	Bonanza
1993	Bonanza: The Return	NBC	Bonanza
1995	Bonanza: Under Attack	NBC	Bonanza
