= Tasmin =

Tasmin is a female given name.

People with the name Tasmin include:

- Tasmin Archer (born 1963), English pop singer
- Tasmin Little (born 1965), English classical violinist
- Tasmin Lucia-Khan (born 1980), British journalist and news presenter
- Tasmin McMahon (born 1993), Australian long-distance runner
- Tasmin Mahfuz (born 1987), American television journalist and news anchor
- Tasmin Mitchell (born 1986), American basketball player and coach
- Tasmin Pepper (born 1990), South African racing driver
- Tasmin Rana, Bangladeshi politician
- Tasmin Nicole Stephens (born 2003), known professionally as TTSSFU, English singer-songwriter and guitarist

== See also ==
- Tamsin (disambiguation)
- TVR Tasmin, British sports car
