= Tropical Storm Tammy (2005) =

Atlantic tropical storm

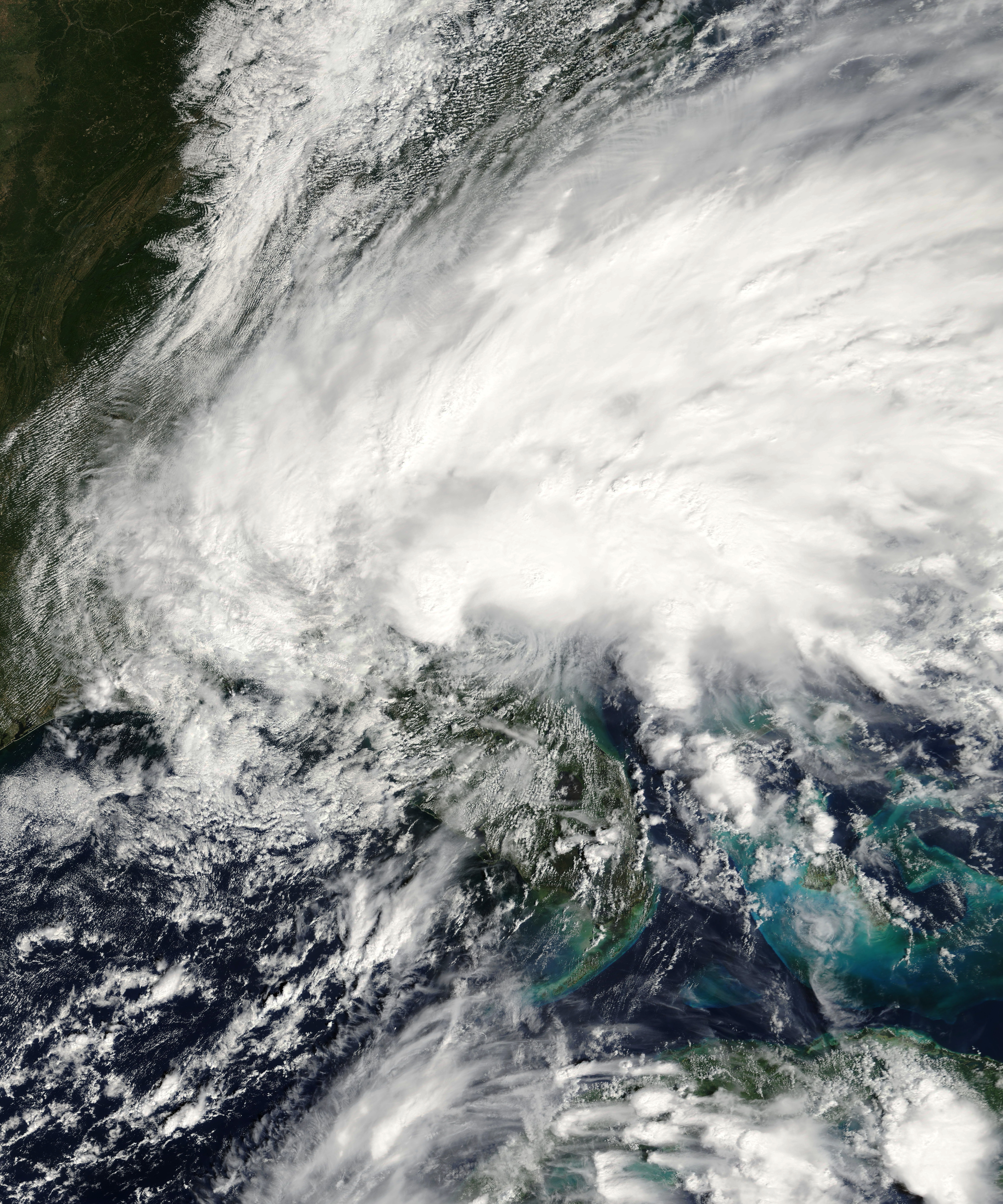
- Tropical Storm Tammy at peak intensity near landfall in Florida on October 5

Meteorological history
- Formed: October 5, 2005
- Dissipated: October 6, 2005

Tropical storm
- 1-minute sustained (SSHWS/NWS)
- Highest winds: 50 mph (85 km/h)
- Lowest pressure: 1001 mbar (hPa); 29.56 inHg

Overall effects
- Fatalities: 10 (1 direct, 9 indirect)
- Damage: $30 million (2005 USD)
- Areas affected: Bahamas, Florida, Georgia, South Carolina
- IBTrACS
- Part of the 2005 Atlantic hurricane season

Tropical Storm Tammy was a short-lived tropical cyclone that affected the East Coast of the United States in October 2005. The 19th named storm of the 2005 Atlantic hurricane season, Tammy formed on October 5 off the east coast of Florida from the interaction of a tropical wave and a trough. After strengthening to a peak intensity of 50 mph (85 km), the storm made landfall in northeastern Florida. Tammy moved into the U.S. state of Georgia, degenerating into a remnant low pressure area, which was absorbed by an extratropical cyclone over the eastern Gulf of Mexico. Tammy and its remnants contributed to ten fatalities.

The storm first affected Florida. Total damages from the storm were $30 million.

== Meteorological history ==
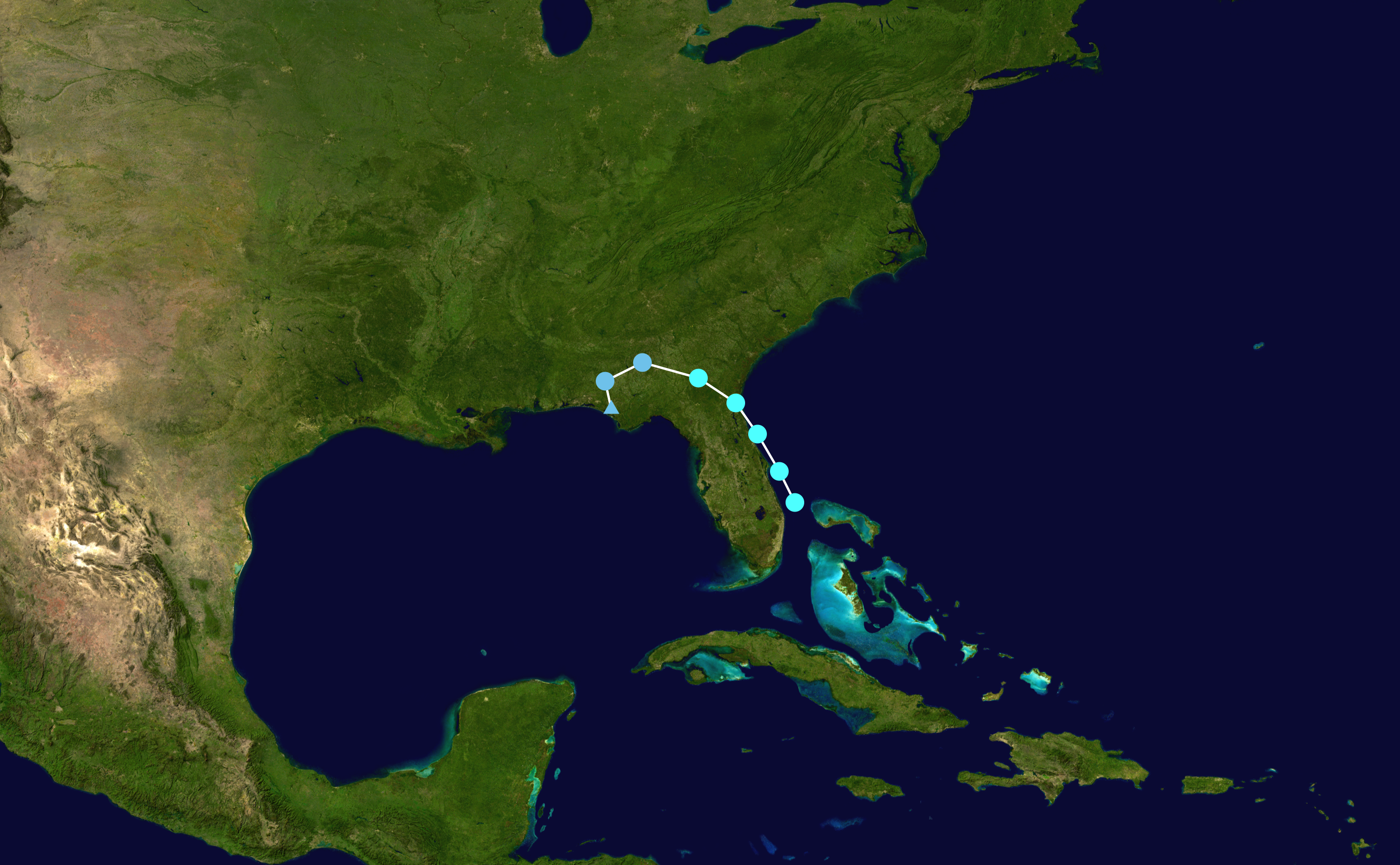
Map plotting the storm's track and intensity, according to the Saffir–Simpson scale Map key Saffir–Simpson scale Tropical depression (≤38 mph, ≤62 km/h) Tropical storm (39–73 mph, 63–118 km/h) Category 1 (74–95 mph, 119–153 km/h) Category 2 (96–110 mph, 154–177 km/h) Category 3 (111–129 mph, 178–208 km/h) Category 4 (130–156 mph, 209–251 km/h) Category 5 (≥157 mph, ≥252 km/h) Unknown Storm type Tropical cyclone Subtropical cyclone Extratropical cyclone, remnant low, tropical disturbance, or monsoon depression

The precursor to Tammy was a tropical wave that left the western coast of Africa on September 24. The wave moved across the Atlantic without any development until October 2, when it started to interact with a mid- to upper-level large trough north of the Lesser Antilles. The system produced an area of convection, or thunderstorms, which spawned a surface trough, although it failed to organize at first due to strong wind shear. The trough moved generally to the northwest, steered by a subtropical ridge over the central Atlantic. On October 4, the central pressure dropped as the trough approached the east coast of Florida, toward an area of lower wind shear. Early on October 5, a circulation developed within the convection, leading to the formation of Tropical Storm Tammy just 23 mi (37 km) east of Jupiter, Florida. The National Hurricane Center (NHC) immediately designated Tammy as a tropical storm due to the presence of gale-force winds.

After its formation, Tammy was moving to the north-northwest, parallel to Florida's east coast, with most of the thunderstorms located northeast of the center. The storm was influenced by a developing extratropical cyclone over the eastern Gulf of Mexico, and the interaction caused an increase in convection. Based on observations from a reconnaissance flight, as well as two nearby ships, the NHC estimated that Tammy strengthened to attain peak winds of 50 mph (85 km) late on October 5. At 23:00 UTC that day, the storm made landfall in northeastern Florida near Atlantic Beach. Tammy soon after moved into the state of Georgia, weakening into a tropical depression and degenerating into a remnant low late on October 6. The low accelerated and turned southwestward, moving across southeastern Alabama and the Florida panhandle before reaching the Gulf of Mexico. On October 7, the remnants of Tammy were absorbed by an extratropical low over the eastern Gulf of Mexico, which was attached to a cold front that moved up the east coast of the United States over the next two days. On October 8, the cold front stalled over the Mid-Atlantic before moving off the coast the next day.

== Preparations ==
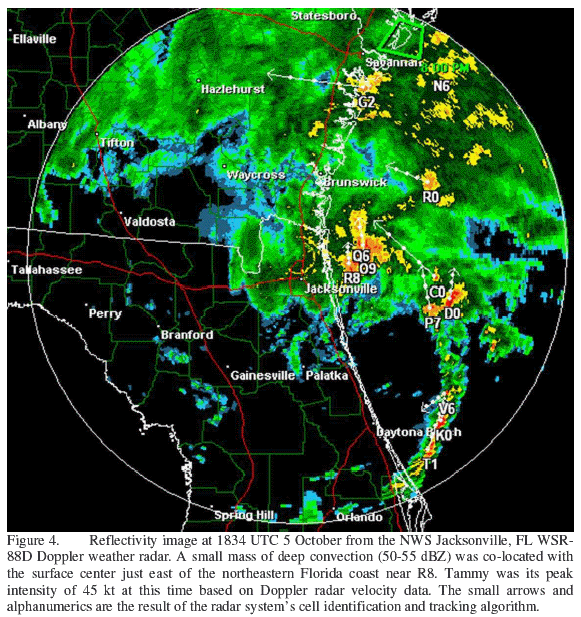
Radar image of Tropical Storm Tammy, 1834Z October 5, 2005.

Tropical Storm Tammy surprised forecasters when it formed on October 5. Because they had not expected the disturbance to develop, warnings were not issued until about 12 hours before the storm made landfall. Despite the short warning, tourists and business travelers canceled flights as the storm neared landfall. Upon the storm developing, a tropical storm warning was immediately issued for the coast from Cocoa Beach, Florida to the Santee River, South Carolina.

The U.S. Department of Homeland Security's U.S. Coast Guard, 7th District issued an advisory to mariners, warning them to prepare for the storm and avoid the ocean if possible. In Georgia, the National Park Service evacuated the residents of Cumberland Island and closed the ferry which services it. The Glynn County Emergency Operations Agency monitored and prepared for Tropical Storm Tammy's landfall, however the poor warning hampered their efforts. Residents all over the state expressed frustration at the lack of time they had to prepare. When Tammy moved inland 12 hours later the southern end of the warning zone moved north to Altamaha Sound, Georgia before all warnings were discontinued on October 6.

== Impact ==
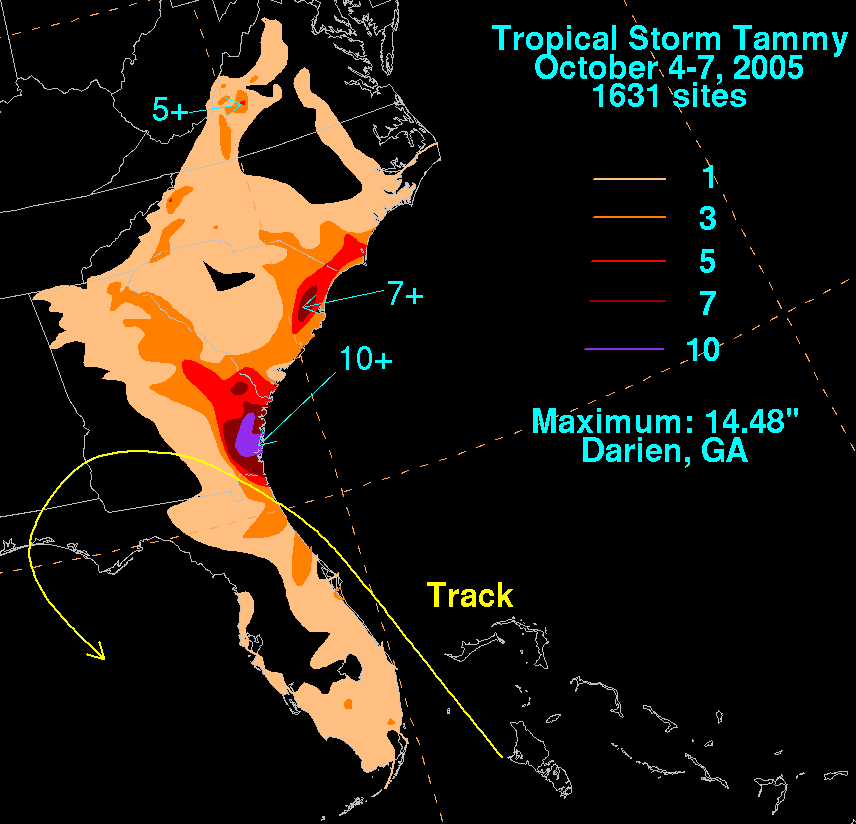
Rainfall totals from Tammy

=== Southeastern United States ===
Tropical Storm Tammy caused minor damage. Its highest sustained winds were 50 mph (80 km/h) and its strongest recorded wind gust was 60 mph (97 km/h). The winds produced no significant damage, but did disrupt power to 16,500 utility customers and delayed the Trysail College Regatta. Lightning produced by a thunderstorm in Broward County, Florida struck three teenagers during a football game in Coconut Creek, killing one and injuring the other two.

To most areas in north Florida and southern Georgia, Tammy brought 3 to 5 in (76 to 127 mm) of rain, though some isolated areas received 10 inches (250 mm). In Georgia, flooding damaged over 30 homes in Brunswick. Several dirt and coastal roads were washed out, and sewers overflowed as far north as Baltimore County, Maryland. Two small pond dams burst, including a 173-year-old wooden dam, but new stone dams were constructed in place before the old ones failed. Conversely, Tammy's rains were beneficial in South Carolina, where they helped alleviate dry conditions after a rainless September.

Tammy's storm surge was approximately 2 to 4 ft (0.61 to 1.22 m) and caused salt-water flooding along the coast of northeastern Florida, Georgia, and South Carolina. The surge damages boardwalks along the coast, and wave action causes over 2 feet (0.61 m) of beach erosion. In addition to the flooding, Tropical Storm Tammy spawned one tornado. Rated an F0 tornado, it touched down near Brunswick, Georgia where it snapped trees and caused moderate roof damage along its 2 mi (3.2 km) path. The storm's total damage was estimated at $30 million (2005 USD). The outer bands of Tammy brought heavy rains, peaking around 7 in (180 mm) in places, and caused significant beach erosion. Winds along the coastline gusted up to 59 mph (95 km/h), downing numerous trees. The worst damage occurred in Beaufort County where 30 trees were downed, one of which fell on a home. Rough seas undermined several beach homes and caused one to be condemned.

=== Northeastern United States ===
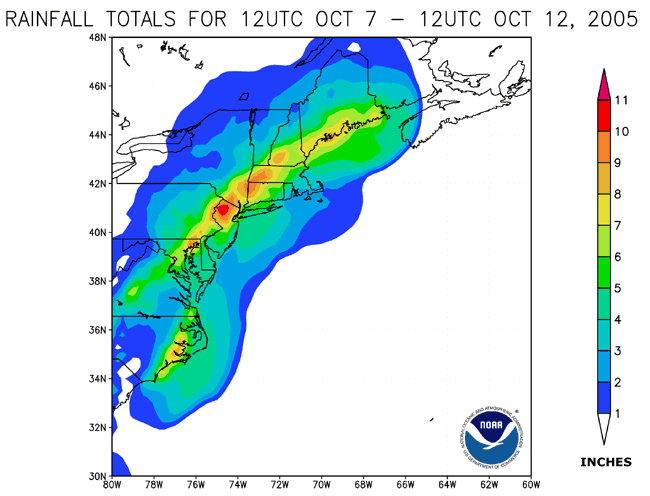
Rainfall totals in the northeastern United States

In the Mid-Atlantic, the rains from the remnants of Tammy led to nine deaths. A tree fall onto a vehicle in Rockville, killing the driver and injuring a passenger. In Pennsylvania, two drivers died – one in Milford Township who died after attempting to cross a flooded road, and the other in Lehigh County. In New Hampshire, there were six deaths related to the heavy rains. The rains caused floods that led to four deaths – four people died in Alstead from a 20 to 30 ft (6.1 to 9.1 m) wave; two people in Unity were swept away driving over a damaged bridge; a kayaker was lost and presumed dead in Antrim. Precipitation reached 11.36 in (289 mm) in Montebello in Nelson County, Virginia, 11.70 in (297 mm) in 12.05 in (306 mm) in New Windsor in New York, and 11.96 in (304 mm) in Brunswick, Maine. The most significant damage occurred in New Hampshire, where the rains reached 9 in (230 mm) in Gilford in Belknap County. In Alstead, an embankment along the Cold River failed. The resulting floods destroyed 40 homes, washed out a bridge, and knocked down 5 mi (8.0 km) of power lines. Statewide, about 1,000 people evacuated due to the floods. Damage in New Hampshire totaled over $13 million. Governor John Lynch declared a state of emergency because of the floods. In neighboring Vermont, the rains triggered a landslide in North Pomfret. Rains in the state reached 6.40 in (163 mm), causing minor street flooding. In Maine, the rains caused river flooding across the southern portion of the state.

Across the Mid-Atlantic, the rains caused flooding that led to power outages and dozens of road closures. Across Maryland, high waters forced 32 people to be evacuated from their homes or vehicles. The rains knocked down trees in Virginia, including one that fell onto a home in Quantico, Virginia. In Washington, D.C., a downed tree fell onto wires near Union Station, which delayed Amtrak service for two and a half hours. In Delaware, the rains caused crop damage and low-lying flooding. In northeastern Pennsylvania, the rains forced 31 houses to evacuate. Two boys in Allentown required rescued from firefighters after climbing a tree to escape floodwaters. The rains caused a landslide in Easton, closing a street. The Lehigh Valley International Airport recorded its wettest day ever on October 7 during the storm. In adjacent New Jersey, rainfall reached 9.84 in (250 mm) in Andover. In Ramsey, the floods closed two bridges and destroyed a driveway. The town of Highlands, New York declared a state of emergency after floodwaters 4 ft (1.2 m) covered parts of the town, including NY 293 and U.S. Route 9W. In Springfield, Massachusetts, the rains caused the roof of an apartment building to collapse. In Greenfield, a swollen river flooded a mobile home park, leaving 35 homes uninhabitable, and leaving 75 people homeless. The floodwaters were strong enough to move several mobile homes off their foundations.

== Aftermath ==
A Red Cross shelter at Seldon Park, Brunswick, Georgia, opened for two days following the storm to temporarily house those whose houses were flooded. As a result of the flooding, the Federal Emergency Management Agency paid $44 million in losses.

Shrimpers in the Carolinas blamed high fuel prices and the disruption of Tropical Storm Tammy for some of the troubles facing the shrimping industry in 2005. Rising fuel prices and dwindling demand has already created tough conditions that year, but the disruption of several days' fishing due to Tammy escalated the situation.

Just days after the remnants of Tammy exited the east coast of the United States, the remnants of a subtropical depression brought additional rainfall to the region, with two people killed in Connecticut due to the floods. Much of the northeastern United States from Delaware to Maine had record rainfall in October 2005, partly because of the remnants of Tammy and later the remnants of Hurricane Wilma. The series of floods led to a presidential disaster declaration for portions of Connecticut, Massachusetts, Rhode Island, and New Hampshire. The Federal Emergency Management Agency (FEMA) provided more than $13 million in funds to Massachusetts. The Federal Highway Administration provided $24 million to New England states following flood damage, most of which went to New Hampshire. Two years after the floods destroyed several mobile homes in Greenfield, Massachusetts, the city purchased the land and turned it into protected greenspace, using state and federal funds. In 2015, the town of Alstead, New Hampshire installed a plaque to commemorate the 10 year anniversary of the floods.

== See also ==
- Other storms of the same name
- List of Florida hurricanes (2000–present)
- Timeline of the 2005 Atlantic hurricane season
- Tropical cyclones in 2005
- Tropical Storm Julia (2016)
