= Tammy (TV series) =

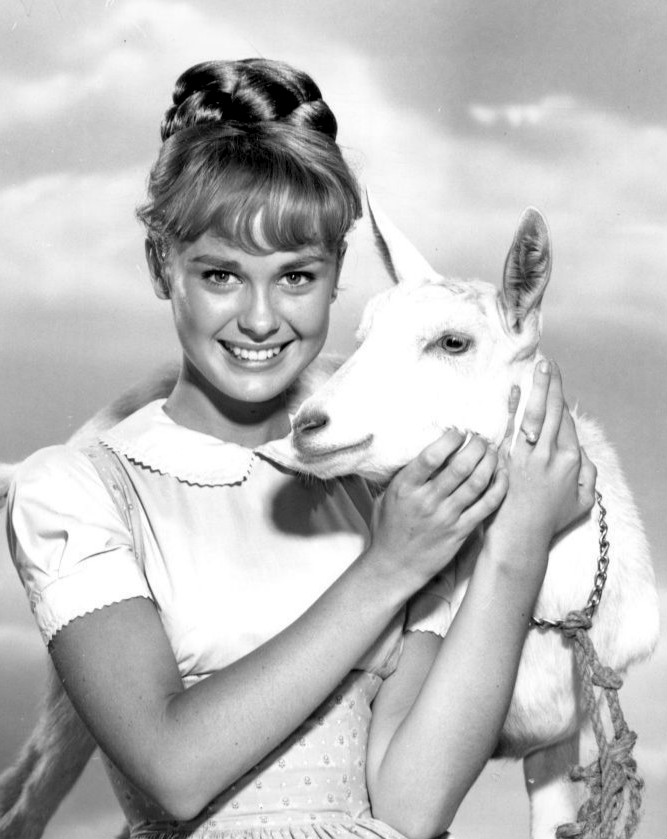
- Genre: Sitcom
- Written by: Robert V. Barron; Cid Ricketts Sumner
- Directed by: Leslie Goodwins; Sidney Miller
- Starring: Debbie Watson; Denver Pyle; Donald Woods; Dorothy Green
- Theme music composer: Jay Livingston; Ray Evans
- Opening theme: "Tammy"
- Country of origin: United States
- Original language: English
- No. of seasons: 1
- No. of episodes: 26

Production
- Producer: Dick Wesson
- Production locations: Universal Studios, Universal City, California, United States
- Camera setup: Single-camera
- Running time: 22–24 minutes
- Production companies: Uni-Bet Productions; Universal Television

Original release
- Network: ABC
- Release: September 17, 1965 – March 11, 1966

Related
- Tammy and the Millionaire

Tammy is an American sitcom, starring Debbie Watson in the title role. Produced by Universal City Studios, 26 color half-hour episodes were aired on ABC from September 17, 1965, to March 11, 1966.

Tammy was loosely based on the three Tammy films; Tammy and the Bachelor (1957) starring Debbie Reynolds; Tammy Tell Me True (1961); and Tammy and the Doctor (1963) both starring Sandra Dee. The films themselves were adaptations of novels by Cid Ricketts Sumner. The series was also partially influenced by other rural-themed TV sitcoms such as The Beverly Hillbillies.

== Synopsis ==
The premise of the program revolves around Tammy Tarleton, an 18-year-old country girl who moves back and forth between her country family, which lives on a bayou houseboat, and the wealthy Brents, who own a plantation and pancake business. Tammy is hired as a secretary by a powerful industrialist with a handsome young son named Steven. Lavinia Tate, a high society neighbor wants her own daughter, Gloria, to marry Steven, so she repeatedly, but unsuccessfully, tries to smear Tammy's reputation.

As with Gidget, there are many differences between the series and films that inspired it. In the films, Tammy's full name is Tambrey Tyree, shortened to Tammy. The name Tyree was changed to Tarleton. Also, Tammy Tyree had no family other than her grandfather, who was occasionally picked up by revenuers for fabricating "corn-likker".

Tammy lasted for one season (26 episodes), and was cancelled in 1966.

== Cast ==
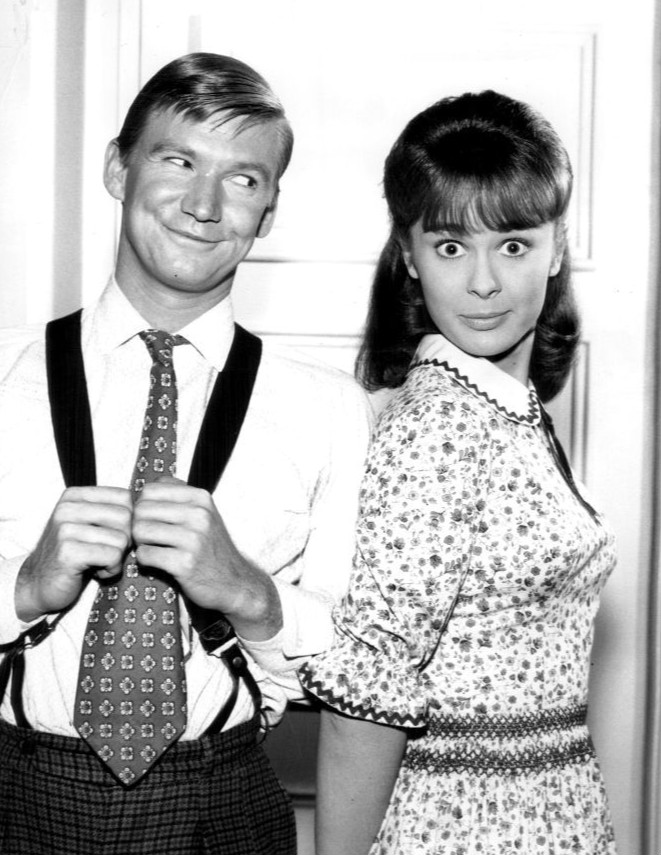
Tammy and Cousin Cletus

- Debbie Watson as Tammy Tarleton
- Denver Pyle as Grandpa Mordechai Tarleton
- Frank McGrath as Uncle Lucius
- Donald Woods as John Brent
- Jay Sheffield as Steven Brent
- George Furth as Dwayne Whitt
- Dennis Robertson as Cousin Cletus Tarleton
- Dorothy Green as Lavinia Tate
- Linda Marshall as Gloria Tate
- David Macklin as Peter Tate

== Production ==
Debbie Watson was 16 when she began playing Tammy and, as a minor, she was only allowed to work four hours a day. One hour was spent on makeup and hair styling, which left only three hours a day for acting. The series shooting schedule was tight so that Watson could fulfill her role as series star.

During the beginning of the series Frank McGrath was one of the main characters in his role as Uncle Lucius. But McGrath suffered a heart attack in September 1965 and had to be temporarily written out of the series until he was able to return after his recovery.

It was hoped that another young recurring character would help the series attract a more youthful audience. Starting with the episode "Cletus Comes Calling" Dennis Robertson began appearing in the role of Cousin Cletus Tarleton.

== Episodes ==
No.	Title	Directed by	Written by	Original release date
1	"Tammy Leaves Home"	Sidney Miller	George Tibbles	September 17, 1965
Tammy is hired as Mr. Brent's secretary, a job Mrs. Lavinia Tate wanted for her daughter. Mrs. Tate tricks Tammy into inviting her riverfolk relatives to a white-tie affair.
2	"The Aristocratic Tates"	Jerry Paris	George Tibbles	September 24, 1965
Tammy is scorned by Lavinia Tate as not being well-born enough for her son to court. Then some no-account Tate kinfolk arrive.
3	"Tammy Plays Cupid"	Jerry Paris	George Carleton Brown & Frank Gill Jr.	October 1, 1965
Tammy tries to bring romance into her grandfather's life when he claims to have no more interest in life.
4	"The Poker Game"	Gene Nelson	David Braverman & Bob Marcus	October 8, 1965
Uncle Lucius joins a high-stakes poker game and ends up losing the Tarletons' houseboat.
5	"The Tarleton Land Grant"	Sidney Miller	George Tibbles	October 15, 1965
Lavinia Tate is planning on taking the Tarleton property for back taxes until Grandpa finds a 1722 land grant stating the Tarletons own half the county, including part of the Tate house.
6	"Prophet and Loss"	Sherman Marks	Robert V. Barron & Jack Marlowe	October 22, 1965
The prophecies of Tammy's Aunt Hannah cause Lavinia Tate to believe she will lose money on a valuable stock purchase recommended by Mr. Brent.
7	"Will the Real Dwayne Whitt Please Stand Up?"	Sherman Marks	Story by : Ben Starr; Teleplay by : Gail Ingram & Ben Starr	October 29, 1965
With an assist from Tammy Dwayne gets an offer to write a serialized magazine story about rural life, and running an illegal whiskey still. Weekends are spent at the Tarleton houseboat to absorb the authentic atmosphere.
8	"Still Waters"	Tom Montgomery	Paul David & John L. Greene	November 5, 1965
Tammy's visiting Uncle Cully takes a job as a gardener to John Brent after he's warned to stay away from stills. When the sheriff finds a still in Mr. Brent's gardening shed Uncle Cully swears that he's making a bug killer to be used on flowers.
9	"Mind Your Manners"	Sherman Marks	Story by : Dorothy Cooper; Teleplay by : Dorothy Cooper and Frank Gill, Jr. & George Carleton Brown	November 12, 1965
When Lavinia Tate learns that Tammy has organized a surprise birthday party for John Brent, she decides to take over the event as hostess. When Mr. Brent's mother shows up to surprise her son Lavinia thinks Mrs. Brent is the caterer and orders her into the kitchen.
10	"Grandpa's Old Flame"	Ezra Stone	Gene Thompson	November 19, 1965
Grandpa learns that his former fiancee is coming to see him based on her impression that he is rich. When Mr. Brent offers to let Grandpa impress his friend by pretending he owns the Brent house the former finance believes she made a mistake by breaking their engagement due to Grandpa not having enough money.
11	"The Riverfyin' of Billy Joe Morgan"	Leslie Goodwins	Sam Locke & Joel Rapp	November 26, 1965
Tammy and Steven Brent are left in charge of an obnoxious boy Lavinia Tate claims is under-privileged. Lavinia is bribing the boy to pretend Tammy is abusing him so that Steven will think the worst of Tammy.
12	"Grandpa's Secret Love"	Leslie Goodwins	Sam Locke & Joel Rapp	December 3, 1965
Grandpa is feeling low from missing his brother Lucius, who is away. He perks up when he finds a new dog he names Delilah. Since Grandpa wants to keep his dog a secret Mr. Brent and Dwayne overhear endearments they think are meant for a pretty girl entering the houseboat.
13	"Cletus Comes Callin'"	Leslie Goodwins	George Tibbles	December 10, 1965
The stranger Grandpa rescues from the river turns out to be Tammy's wheeler-dealer cousin Cletus. His not-quite-legal business deals require Grandpa and Tammy to remind him of the difference between right and wrong.
14	"The Enoch Bowl"	Sherman Marks	Story by : Stuart Jerome; Teleplay by : William Raynor & Myles Wilder	December 17, 1965
The Tarleton mule quits eating when Cletus sells its antique feed bowl to Lavinia, who donates it to a museum. Dwayne uses his potter's wheel to make a replica bowl, but there is a mixup between the two clay vessels.
15	"A Severe Case of Matrimony"	Sherman Marks	Michael Fessier	December 24, 1965
Lavinia's handsome cousin comes for a visit as an excuse to run away from the woman he proposed to. Lavinia wants Tammy to fall for her cousin so Mr. Brent will see her as a lovesick girl, but Tammy helps his fiancé win him back.
16	"T' Know Me Is T' Love Me"	Claudio Guzman	Martin Grupsmith & Safford Lynne, Story By Jay Selby & Jessica Benson	December 31, 1965
Cletus accidentally pounds a post through an oil pipeline. When oil starts seeping from the ground the Tarletons believe they'll soon be millionaires.
17	"The Law and Mr. Tarleton"	Paul Harrison	William Raynor & Myles Wilder	January 7, 1966
Amos Potts tickets the Tarleton mule for illegal parking. Grandpa insists the mule moved itself to the no-parking area and takes the case to court, with Cletus as his lawyer.
18	"Lavinia's Wedding Day"	Charles Rondeau	Ben Starr & George Tibbles	January 14, 1966
Lavinia flirts with Mr Brent's houseguest, Carl Boonelight, to make John Brent jealous. Through a misunderstanding Tammy and Cletus plan a wedding for Lavinia and Carl.
19	"Two for Tee Pee"	Sherman Marks	David Braverman & Robert Marcus	January 21, 1966
Chief Black Cloud arrives to make Cletus keep a promise and marry his annoying daughter Little Rose. Her true love, Crazy Wolf (Steve Franken), shows up to try and win Little Rose's hand in marriage. Chief Black Cloud declares Cletus and Crazy Wolf will compete in athletic contests, with the winner marrying the chief's daughter, but Crazy Cloud is too clumsy and stupid to win anything.
20	"Blue Nose, Wet Nose"	Sherman Marks	Elroy Schwartz	January 28, 1966
Lavinia Tate goes all out to have her ill-behaved poodle, King Alphonse, defeat her rival's dog at obedience trials. Grandpa is able to train King, but the poodle will only obey when Grandpa's hound Delilah is around – and Lavinia gives commands in river folk talk.
21	"The Monster from Catfish Bend"	Sherman Marks	William Raynor & Myles Wilder	February 4, 1966
For 40 years Grandpa has been trying to catch Big Luke, a 300-pound catfish. Gloria Tate promises to go with Cletus to the Founder's Day dance if Cletus lands Big Luke, so Cletus is determined to catch the fish, using methods Grandpa considers unsportsmanlike.
22	"Larnin' Works Wonders"	David Butler	Peter Barry & Sandra Gould	February 11, 1966
To keep his teaching credentials, Dwayne Whitt holds classes on Grandpa's houseboat. When he takes the class on a field trip to an island Lavinia convinces Mr. Brent to go along so he'll see how ignorant river folk are. But when the boat drifts away, and they are trapped on the island, the river folk know how to build a shelter and find food.
23	"Tammy Goes to Paris"	Sherman Marks	George Tibbles	February 18, 1966
Lavinia invites herself and Gloria along on Tammy and John Brent's trip to France, in hopes of convincing Mr. Brent to propose marriage. When Grandpa and Cletus show up to chaperone Tammy there's no time for romance.
24	"The Cinemazation of Tammy Tarleton"	Charles R. Rondeau	Sam Locke & Joel Rapp	February 25, 1966
Tammy is chosen to act in a TV commercial for Mr. Brent's pancake mix, but Lavinia plots to get the assignment for her daughter Gloria. They talk Cletus into reshooting and editing the commercial with his "genius" touches, only to find the audience loves his comic version.
25	"Uncle Lucius Returns"	Sherman Marks	Story by : Ben Starr; Teleplay by : Ben Starr & Andre Stojka	March 4, 1966
After being gone for months (actor Frank McGrath had been recovering from a heart attack) Uncle Lucius mails himself to Grandpa in a C.O.D. crate, but the two brothers quarrel bitterly after their reunion. Mr. Brent and Dwayne try to reason with them, but it takes Tammy to come up with a way to make Grandpa and Uncle Lucius get along.
26	"Uncle Lucius, the Business Man"	Earl Bellamy	Gail Ingram & Mort Green	March 11, 1966
The Tarletons enter Beulah, a cow that only gives milk when Uncle Lucius sings her favorite song, in a milking contest. Lavinia Tate wants her cow to win so she comes up with a way to have Lucius jailed. Steve Brent and Tammy devise a plan to record the locked-up man singing.

== Tammy and the Millionaire ==
In 1967, Universal Pictures released a cinema movie called Tammy and the Millionaire which was a re-edit from four half-hour Tammy TV episodes (Tammy Leaves Home, The Aristocratic Tates, The Tarleton Land Grant, and The Rivertyin’ of Billy Joe Morgan).

== International airings ==
Tammy was originally broadcast in several countries, including Japan, Germany, and Australia. The Tammy series was especially popular in Germany.
