= Tammy (film series) =

Film series

The Tammy films are a series of four American romantic comedy films about a young woman from rural Mississippi. They were produced by Universal Pictures between 1957 and 1967 and based on the character created in Cid Ricketts Sumner's 1948 book Tammy Out of Time.

The main character of the first three films, Tambrey "Tammy" Tyree, is a kind and friendly country girl who finds romantic love. Tammy's rustic southern dialect reflects her rural upbringing and belies her status as an outsider in modern culture. In the original novel, Tammy Out of Time, Professor Brent discovers that Tammy uses expressions dating back to Chaucer and vocabulary from the Elizabethan era "as is true of some of the mountain folk of Kentucky and Tennessee."

Tammy and the Bachelor was the basis for the television sitcom Tammy (1965–1966). In the series, Tammy's last name was Tarleton, and she lives on a houseboat with her grandfather and uncle but finds work as the secretary of wealthy Mr. Brent. Four episodes of Tammy were reedited into the last Tammy movie, Tammy and the Millionaire.

== Film synopsis ==
=== Tammy and the Bachelor (1957) ===
Seventeen-year-old Tammy (Debbie Reynolds) lives on a houseboat with her grandfather (Walter Brennan). One day she discovers the wreckage of a plane and the unconscious pilot, Peter Brent (Leslie Nielsen). Tammy and Grandpa nurse him back to health, and before he leaves for home Peter tells Tammy that if anything happens to her kin she can come and stay with the Brent family. When Grandpa is arrested for making moonshine, Tammy and her pet goat, Nan, go to live at Brentwood Hall. With her rustic skills and common sense, Tammy is able to save the aristocratic Brent family from bankruptcy. She and Peter fall in love.

=== Tammy Tell Me True (1961) ===
Tammy's (Sandra Dee) boyfriend, Pete, has left for agricultural college but has not written to her, so she decides to take classes at a local college. She is sent to be a companion/caregiver to rich widow Annie Rook Call, (Beulah Bondi) but the lady ends up moving into Tammy's houseboat, and she remembers living on her uncle's shanty-boat. Tammy falls in love with one of her teachers, Tom Freeman (John Gavin).

=== Tammy and the Doctor (1963) ===
When Mrs. Call (Beulah Bondi) needs medical treatment in California Tammy (Sandra Dee) goes with her, becomes a nurse's aide, and is wooed by a doctor (Peter Fonda).

=== Tammy and the Millionaire (1967) ===
A re-edit of four half-hour episodes of the Tammy TV series. The re-edited episodes were: Tammy Leaves Home, The Aristocratic Tates, The Tarleton Land Grant, and The Rivertyin’ of Billy Joe Morgan.

Tammy Tarleton (Debbie Watson) had been raised on a houseboat by her grandpa (Denver Pyle) and Uncle Lucius (Frank McGrath) before being hired as a secretary for wealthy John Brent (Donald Woods). His neighbor, Lavinia Tate (Dorothy Green) was always trying to make Tammy look bad so that Brent's son, Steven (Jay Sheffield) will become interested in Mrs. Tate's daughter. But Mrs. Tate's plans always backfire, and Tammy ends up impressing Mr. Brent, and winning Steven's heart.
