= Cid Ricketts Sumner =

American novelist

Cid Ricketts Sumner (September 27, 1890 – October 15, 1970) was a novelist from the United States whose works inspired several Hollywood films. She also taught English at a Jackson, Mississippi, high school and French at Millsaps College.

Among Sumner's books is Tammy out of Time (1948), which inspired the Tammy film series and television series.

== Biography ==
Sumner was born Bertha Louise Ricketts in Brookhaven, Mississippi on September 27, 1890. She was the daughter of Bertha Burnley and Robert Scott Ricketts. Her father was a professor at Millsaps College, and her mother and grandmother provided a homeschooled education for her. She later on received the nickname "Cid" from her parents because of her placid nature. She received a BS from Millsaps College in Jackson, Mississippi in 1909 and an MA from Columbia University in 1910. She continued postgraduate work at Columbia from 1910 to 1914, then enrolled in medical school at Cornell University. She attended only one year of medical school before marrying one of her professors, James B. Sumner, on July 10, 1915 and dropping out of school. They had four children and she focused on raising her children until they were old enough to go to school and handle themselves. It was at this point that she started writing her books. After her divorce with James, she taught English at a High School in Jackson, and taught French at Millsaps College, where her father taught and she also attended.

Her first novel, Ann Singleton, was published in 1938, but it was not very popular. Sumner's career took off when her second book, Quality, was published in 1946. A novel that opposed segregation, it was about a light-skinned black woman, who could pass as a white woman, practiced as a nurse up North, fell in love with a white man, and moved back South. The theme was very controversial, and the story was adapted into the 1949 film Pinky, starring Jeanne Crain. The story caused so many disputes that some southern theaters refused to play it because of its progressive nature a decade before the Civil Rights Movement. The film is "often referred to as one of Hollywood's first interracial films", according to the Mississippi Encyclopedia.

=== Tammy series ===
Her third book is probably her most well known novel. Tammy out of Time, was published in 1948. This novel was adapted to film in 1957 in Tammy and the Bachelor, starring Debbie Reynolds. The book was so popular that Ricketts wrote two more novels based on this one (Tammy Tell Me True, in 1959 and Tammy in Rome in 1965) and three more films were also released (Tammy Tell Me True in 1961 and Tammy and the Doctor in 1963, starring Sandra Dee, and Tammy and the Millionaire in 1967 starring Debbie Watson). There was also a short-lived 1965 TV series, Tammy, inspired by the films. Modak-Truran says that "The first thing that comes to mind when I think of movies adapted from novels by Cid Ricketts Sumner is a romantic comedy featuring a cuddly Mississippi-bred cutie-pie who is head over heels in love with the perfect bachelor". Towards the end of her life, she wrote more non-fiction books that were centered around her experiences while traveling different parts of the world. Several of these movies were on top 50 lists along with their songs.

=== Other novels ===
Sumner published eight other novels: But the Morning Will Come (1949), Sudden Glory (1951), The Hornbeam Tree (1953), Traveler in the Wilderness (1957), View from the Hill (1957), Christmas Gift (1959), Withdraw Thy Foot (1964), and Saddle Your Dreams (1964)—as well as a number of short stories.

=== Non-fiction ===
In 1955, Sumner joined the Eggert-Hatch river expedition, the purpose of which was to make the last films of the Green and Colorado River canyons before construction began on Flaming Gorge and Glen Canyon dams. She was the only female member of the expedition. She applied to be a member after reading an ad placed by Charles Eggert in the personals column of the Saturday Review, and was accepted after she proved to Charles Eggert that she could stand up to the rigors of the river expedition. She was not allowed to float through Cataract Canyon on the Colorado, as Don Hatch, the head boatman, felt that it was too dangerous, but she rejoined the party at Hite, Utah, and floated all the way through to Lees Ferry, Arizona, where the first leg of the expedition ended. When the journey resumed the next year for the section through the Grand Canyon, she did not return. Sumner wrote a book about her journey called Traveler in the Wilderness, published by Harper in 1957.

=== Later life and murder ===
After her writing career, she moved up North, living the rest of her life mostly in New York or Massachusetts. Sumner died violently, being bludgeoned to death at the age of 80 in Duxbury, Massachusetts by her grandson, John R. Cutler, who was charged with her murder.
