= Jay Sheffield =

American actor (1934–98)

- Publicity Photo of Jay Sheffield
- Born: September 25, 1934
- Died: June 25, 1998 (aged 63)
- Occupation: Actor
- Spouse: Barbara Babcock (m. 1962–1968)

Jay Howard Sheffield (September 25, 1934 – June 25, 1998) was an American actor, who appeared on the stage, in films, and on television. He married Barbara Babcock on June 9, 1962, in San Mateo, California. They later divorced.

Sheffield played Pvt. Langellia in the 1960 Off-Broadway production of Paths of Glory. In 1963 Sheffield played Phileas Fogg III in The Three Stooges Go Around the World in a Daze.

He played Ezel in the May 31, 1964 Oh, My Aching Antenna episode of My Favorite Martian. From September 1965 to July 1966 he played Steven Brent on the ABC television series Tammy. He was also in Tammy and the Millionaire (1967), a film made from four episodes of the show.

Sheffield was in numerous episodes of Hogan's Heroes, including How to Escape From a Prison Camp Without Really trying (March 2, 1968, played Corporal), How to Catch a Papa Bear (October 12, 1968, played Gestapo Officer), and Never Play Cards With Strangers (November 9, 1968, played Captain Moss).
