= Tasmin Mahfuz =

American television journalist and news anchor (born 1987)

- Born: May 28, 1987 (age 39); West Palm Beach, Florida, U.S.
- Education: Bachelor's degree Master's degree
- Alma mater: Emory University
- Occupation: TV news anchor
- Years active: 2012–present
- Television: WGAL
- Awards: Mid-Atlantic Emmy Award - Best Daytime Newscast - WGAL News 8 at 4PM (2026) Mid-Atlantic Emmy Award - Best News Feature (Multiple Reports) - Answering the Call (2026) Gracie Award (2015)

Tasmin Mahfuz (born May 28, 1987) is an Emmy Award-winning American television journalist and news anchor. In December 2015, Mahfuz, also a Gracie award recipient, joined WDVM, formerly known as WHAG, as an evening news anchor, making her the first Bengali-American woman to anchor a nightly newscast. She then left in 2024 and is currently working at WGAL as the 4 p.m., 7 p.m. and 10 p.m. anchor.

== Early life and education ==
Mahfuz was born and raised in Florida, the daughter of Abdul and Nazmun Mahfuz. Her parents are both of Bangladeshi descent. Her father, Abdul, is a businessman and philanthropist, emigrated to the United States in 1979 when he was 19 years old from Chittagong, Bangladesh. His many charitable projects includes a college and an all-girls high school in Chandanaish, Bangladesh, for rural girls to receive an education, which otherwise was impossible for women in the area due to distance and poverty. Nazmun produced and hosted weekly television shows for South Florida's PBS and WLRN.

She attended high school at The King's Academy in West Palm Beach and went on to complete a Bachelor's degree in international relations from Emory University in 2009. Following her graduation, Mahfuz took part in an internship at the United Nations.

== Career ==
In 2012, she joined Ebru TV, an international network, and reported from New Jersey, New York City and Washington, DC. Her assignments included covering the devastation after Hurricane Sandy in New Jersey and the Sandy Hook shooting in Newtown, Connecticut. Mahfuz reported from the United Nations, providing Breaking news from the UN General Assembly, on US–Iran relations, the Crimean annexation and developments in Syria.

In August 2014, Mahfuz joined ABC 4 Utah as a reporter/ Southern Utah Bureau Chief. She launched the station's first TV news bureau in St. George.

Mahfuz joined DC News Now in December 2015 as a full-time evening news anchor. She anchored the weeknight news from 6–8 p.m. and 9–11:30 p.m. to audiences in the Washington DC market, which includes Maryland, Northern Virginia.

In 2024, she left the station to join WGAL as its 4 p.m. and 10 p.m. anchor.

== Awards ==
Mahfuz won the Alliance of Women in Media's Gracie Award for Outstanding Producer in TV news in June 2015. The Society of Professional Journalists – Utah Chapter presented Mahfuz an award for her reports as a multimedia journalist in 2015. In 2015 and 2017, the Federation of Bangladeshi Associations in North America recognized Mahfuz for her work in mainstream journalism as a 2nd generation Bengali-American.
