= Tammy Jo =

Tammy Jo is a given name. Notable persons with this name include:

- Tammy Jo Kirk (born 1962), American racer
- Tammy Jo Alexander (1963–1979), American murder victim formerly known as "Caledonia Jane Doe"
- Tammy Jo Zywicki (1971–1992), American murder victim
- Tammy Jo Trask, protagonist of the Southern Witch series by Kimberly Frost

== See Also ==
- Tammie Jo Shults (born 1961), American aviator and writer
