= Thamara =

Thamara is a feminine Sinhalese given name. Notable people with the name include:

- Thamara Abeyratne (born 1978), Sri Lankan cricketer
- Thamara de Swirsky (1888–1961), Russian-born dancer
