= Tamora =

Tamora may refer to:

- Tamora, Nebraska, a village in the United States
- TVR Tamora, a British sports car
- Tamora Pierce (born 1954), American writer
- Tamora, a character in William Shakespeare's play Titus Andronicus
