= Tammi Piermarini =

American horse racing jockey

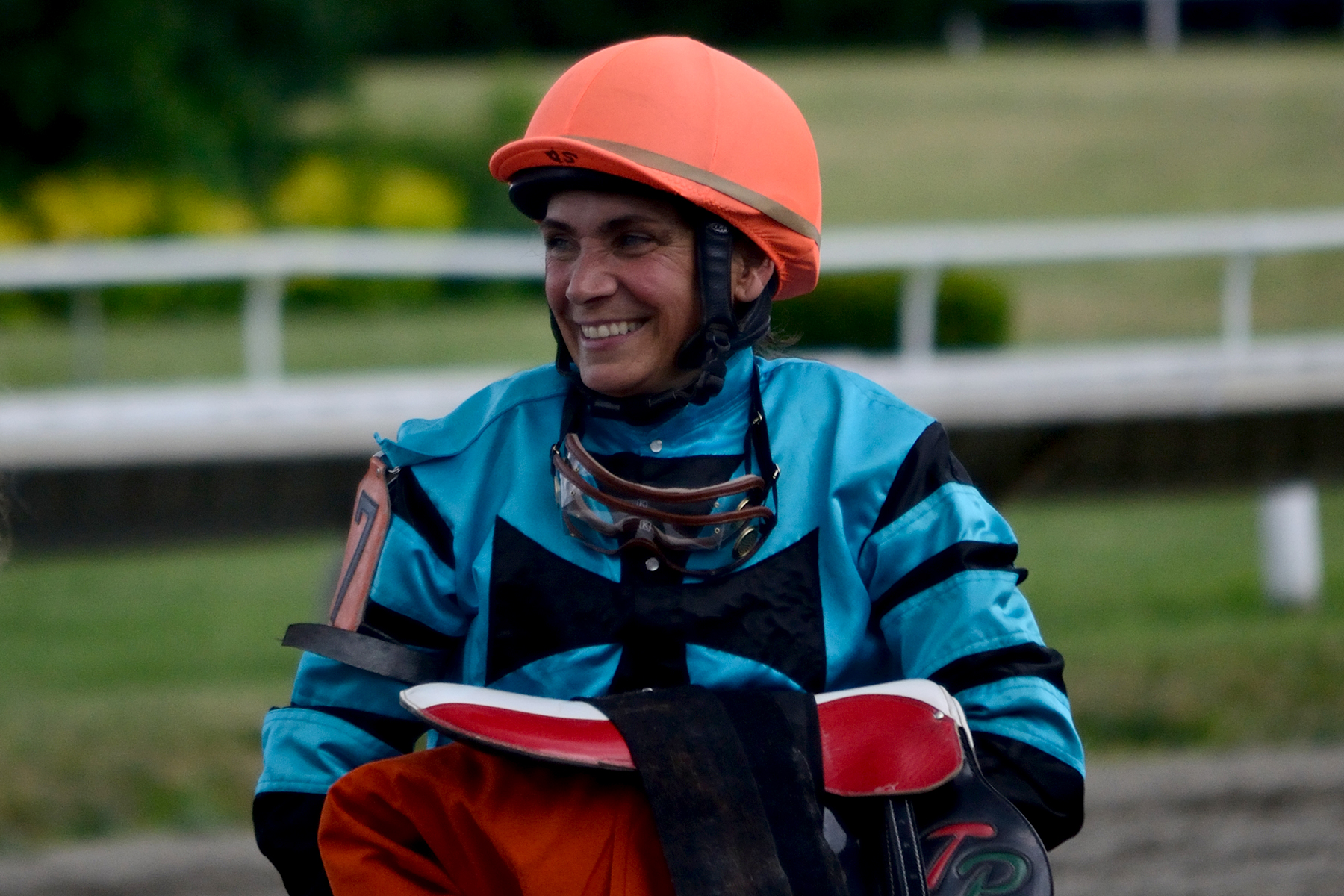
Tammi Piermarini

Tammi Piermarini (born May 2, 1967 in Newburyport, Massachusetts) is an American thoroughbred horse racing jockey.

== Career ==
Piermarini began riding at Suffolk Downs in East Boston, Massachusetts in 1985, under her maiden name, Tammi Campbell. She finished fourth in her first race and won her second aboard Go Darby And Joan on August 30, 1985. In 2012, she became the third-leading female rider of all time, with 2,139 career wins. Through 2021, Piermarini has won 2,556 races.

In 2007, Piermarini became the third woman to win the Suffolk Downs leading jockey title. She regularly topped the Suffolk standings in the following years, winning the title again in 2010, 2011, 2012, 2013, 2015, and 2017.

Continuing her success, in 2014, Piermarini was inducted into the New England Hall of Fame.

During the course of her career, Piermarini has ridden at 30 different racetracks, including Parx and Finger Lakes.
