= Tammi (surname) =

- Language: Finnish

Origin
- Derivation: tammi

Tammi is a Finnish-language surname. As of 22 June 2026, Tammi is the surname of 1,667 Finnish citizens. Notable people with the surname include:

- Abdullah Tammi, founder of the Finnish Islamic Party
- Anton Tammi, Finnish music video director
- Emma Tammi (born 1982), American filmmaker
- Jukka Tammi (born 1962), Finnish ice hockey goaltender
- Taisto Tammi (1945-1979), Finnish singer

== See also ==
- Tamminen
