= Tamara Manukova =

Belarusian politician (born 1953)

- Тамара Манукова

Member of the Supreme Council of the Republic
- In office 9 January 1996 – 9 January 2001

Personal details
- Born: Tamara Anatoljeuna Manukova; 11 February 1953 (age 73) Novogrudok, Byelorussian SSR, Soviet Union
- Party: Communist Party of Byelorussia (until 1991); Belarusian Party of Communists
- Education: Yanka Kupala State University of Grodno; Maksim Tank Belarusian State Pedagogical University
- Occupation: Teacher

Tamara Anatoljeuna Manukova (Belarusian: Тамара Анатольеўна Манукова; Russian: Тамара Анатольевна Манукова; born 11 February 1953) is a Belarusian teacher and politician. She was a deputy of the 13th Belarusian Supreme Council and secretary of the Central Committee of the Belarusian Left Party "A Just World".

== Biography ==
=== Early life and career ===
Manukova was born on 11 February 1953 in Novogrudok of the Byelorussian SSR. In 1975, she graduated from the Yanka Kupala State University of Grodno, and in 1982 from the Maksim Tank Belarusian State Pedagogical University. From 1975 to 1977, she worked as a methodologist at the Novogrudok House of Pioneers and Disciples. From 1978 to 1984, 1991 to 1996 and since 1998, she has been a tutor and teacher at the Novogrudok Boarding School for Children with Serious Speech Impairments. From 1984 to 1991, she served as a consultant in the political education office, head of the general section, ideology and propaganda department, and secretary of the Novogrudok City Committee of the Communist Party of Byelorussia. From 1996 to 1998, she had been unemployed. She belonged to the Belarusian Party of Communists and served as secretary of its Central Committee. From 1990 to 1995, she was a deputy to the Novogrudok City Council of Deputies.

=== Member of the Supreme Council (1996–2001) ===
In the second round of supplementary parliamentary elections on 10 December 1995, Manukova was elected member of the Supreme Council of Belarus of the 13th term from the Academic Electoral District No. 137 of the town of Novogrudok. On 19 December 1995, she was registered by the Central Electoral Commission, and on 9 January 1996, she was sworn in as a deputy. From 23 January, she served in the Supreme Council as a member, and then as secretary of the Standing Committee for State Construction and Local Government. Manukova she belonged to the communist faction. From June 3, she was a member of the working group of the Supreme Council for cooperation with the Grand National Assembly of Turkey.

Manukova was one of the deputies who were not allowed to participate in the First All-Belarusian People's Assembly organized on 19–20 November 1996 by President Alexander Lukashenko. Immediately afterwards, she condemned the organization of the Assembly as an undemocratic event whose participants were not elected but appointed. On 27 November 1996, after the president's controversial and partly internationally unrecognized change to the constitution, she was not a member of the House of Representatives of the first term. According to the Constitution of Belarus of 1994, her mandate as a deputy to the Supreme Council ended on 9 January 2001; however, subsequent elections to this body were never held.

== Personal life ==
Manukova has a son.
