= Henri Tamminen =

Finnish ice hockey player

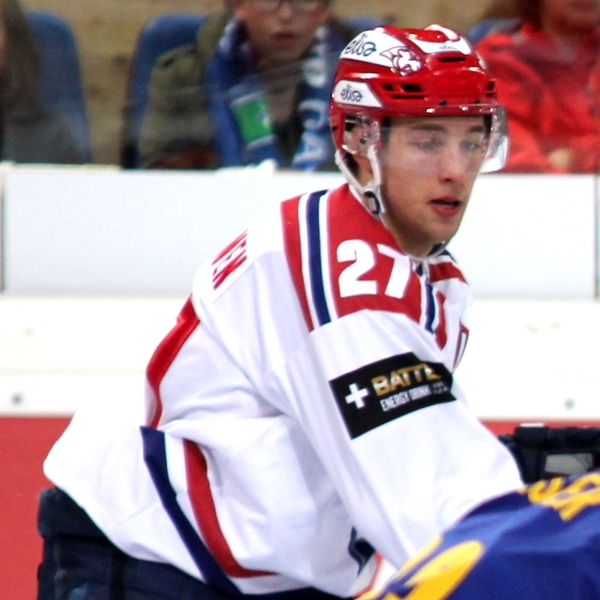
- Born: April 22, 1993 (age 33) Espoo, Finland
- Height: 6 ft 2 in (188 cm)
- Weight: 190 lb (86 kg; 13 st 8 lb)
- Position: Right Wing
- Shoots: Right
- HockeyEttan team Former teams: Bodens HF; HIFK LeKi; KooKoo
- NHL draft: Undrafted
- Playing career: 2013–present

Henri Tamminen (born April 22, 1993) is a Finnish professional ice hockey player. He is currently playing for Bodens HF of the Swedish HockeyEttan.

Tamminen made his Liiga debut playing with HIFK during the 2013–14 Liiga season.
