= Tammie =

- Gender: Female

Origin
- Region of origin: England

Other names
- Variant form: Tammy

Tammie is a feminine given name, an abbreviation of Thomasina and Tamara. Notable people with the name include:

- Tammie Green (born 1959), American golfer
- Tammie Brown (born 1980), American drag performer and recording artist
- Tammie Souza, American meteorologist
- Tammie Wilson, American politician
- Tammie Allen (born 1964), Native American potter
- Tammie Leady (born 1969), American personal trainer and fitness and figure competitor
- Tammie Teclemariam (born 1990), American freelance food and wine writer.
