= List of storms named Tammy =

The name Tammy has been used for two tropical cyclones in the Atlantic Ocean.

- Tropical Storm Tammy (2005) – short‑lived tropical storm that affected Florida
- Hurricane Tammy (2023) – long‑lived Category 2 hurricane that made landfall on Barbuda, then passed to the east of Bermuda
