= Frank McGrath (actor) =

American actor and stunt performer (1903–1967)

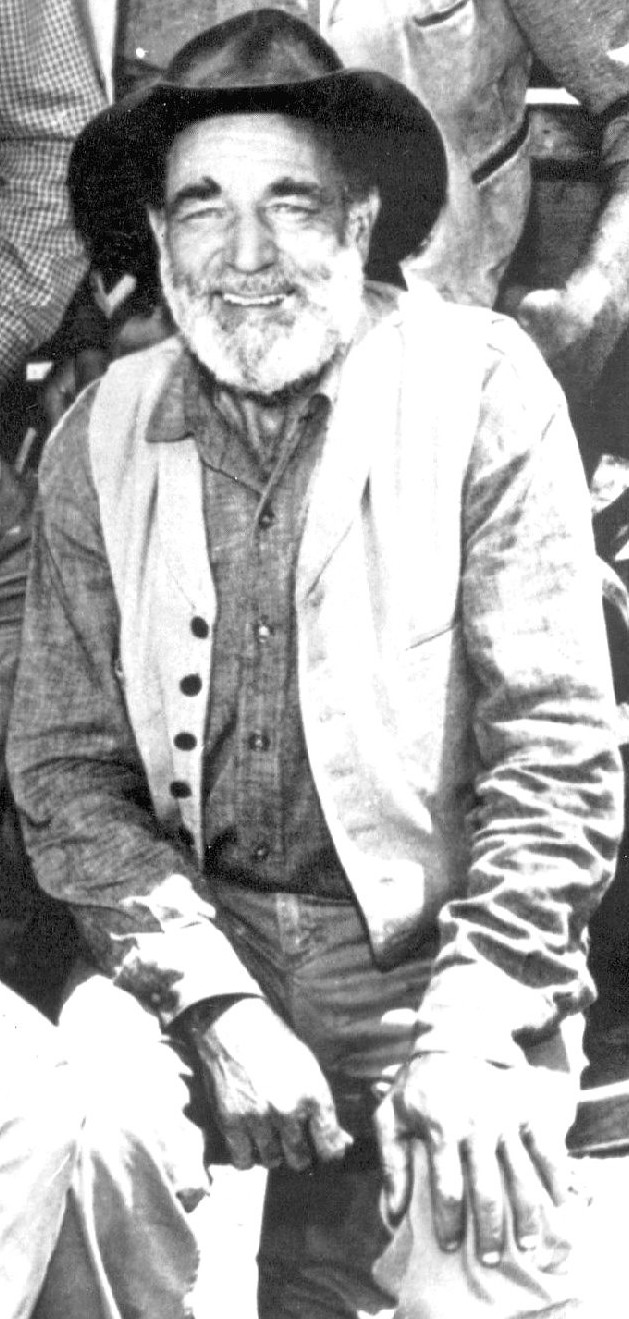
- Frank McGrath in Wagon Train (1962)
- Born: Benjamin Franklin McGrath; February 2, 1903; Mound City, Missouri, U.S.
- Died: May 13, 1967 (aged 64); Beverly Hills, California, U.S.
- Resting place: Forest Lawn Memorial Park in Glendale, California
- Occupations: Actor; stunt performer
- Years active: 1925–1967
- Spouse: Libby Quay Buschlen McGrath (?–1967, his death)
- Children: Quay Casey Dillon (stepson)

Benjamin Franklin McGrath (February 2, 1903 – May 13, 1967) was an American television and film actor and stunt performer who played the comical, optimistic cook with the white beard, Charlie B. Wooster, on the western series Wagon Train for five seasons on NBC and then three seasons on ABC. McGrath appeared in all 272 episodes in the eight seasons of the series, which had ended its run only two years before his death. McGrath's Wooster character hence provided the meals and companionship for both fictional trail masters, Ward Bond as Seth Adams and John McIntire as Christopher "Chris" Hale.

== Early life ==
McGrath was born in Mound City in Holt County in far northwestern Missouri.

== Career ==
His first role, uncredited, was in the 1932 film, The Rainbow Trail, a study of Mormon polygamy based on a 1915 Zane Grey novel of the same name. In 1948 and 1949, McGrath was the US Army Bugler in two of the greatest westerns ever made, Fort Apache and She Wore a Yellow Ribbon. In Fort Apache, McGrath appeared in fifty one scenes with both main characters John Wayne and Henry Fonda. In She Wore a Yellow Ribbon, McGrath appeared in one hundred and twelve scenes (112). Only John Wayne himself surpassed McGrath in scenes in this movie. McGrath worked closely with John Wayne and was in many screen shots in both of these films, which were directed by John Ford. Even at the age of fifty-three, the durable stunt performer McGrath completed three separate horse fall and drag scenes for the 1956 John Wayne picture The Searchers not long after McGrath had barely recovered from having broken his back.

A year before Wagon Train began, McGrath appeared briefly as ranch foreman John Pike in a 1956 episode "Quicksand" of the first hour-long television Western series, ABC's Cheyenne, starring Clint Walker. In 1957, McGrath had an uncredited role as a stagecoach driver in the Henry Fonda film, The Tin Star. In 1958, he portrayed the character Jake Rivers in the episode "The Most Dangerous Man Alive" on NBC's Tales of Wells Fargo, starring Dale Robertson.

After Wagon Train, McGrath appeared in 1965 and 1966 as Uncle Lucius in nine episodes of ABC's situation comedy Tammy, with Debbie Watson in the title role and Denver Pyle as the grandfather. Thereafter, McGrath was a guest star on two network westerns, as stagecoach driver Neddie Henshaw on the 1966 episode "Linda" of NBC's The Virginian and as Buster in the March 13, 1967, episode "Plunder", of ABC's The Big Valley. Shortly before his death, McGrath played a bartender in the picture The War Wagon, the character Ned Martin in Gunfight in Abilene, and Ballard Weeks in Glenn Ford's, The Last Challenge. All three films were released in 1967.

For a number of years he was a stand-in and stunt double for Academy Award winning actor Warner Baxter. He so greatly resembled Baxter that they could have passed for brothers according to Los Angeles Times reporter John Scott writing in 1935. The two men formed a friendship outside of the studios and McGrath worked in several capacities for him.

Still photos exist today from 20th Century Fox film "Slave Ship" (1937) showing identically dressed Baxter and his stand-in, McGrath, looking very much like brothers. In late 1938, McGrath gave an extensive interview carried by the Associated Press. He said they had met in 1928. Baxter was taken by their resemblance to each other and had him used as a stand-in. If closer in age they could have passed for twin brothers. By 1935, that professional relationship was written into Baxter's contracts. In 1938, McGrath was being paid $150 per week ($2,762.32 in 2019) part by Baxter and part by his studio to be a stand-in, stunt double, and personal trainer. Stand-ins at that time usually were paid $35 per week. They did much together to maintain Baxter's fitness to include swimming, tennis, boxing, and occasional body guard. A personal friendship grew from that. They hunted several times a year in addition to fishing trips. It was on a hunting trip to a remote part of Colorado in 1934 when McGrath saved Baxter's life. Baxter had broken his leg and McGrath carried him for four days on his back out of the wilderness and to a hospital. It was that event that cemented the personal friendship. When asked what they would talk about, McGrath said anything but pictures.

His last role was as Mr. Remington in the Don Knotts comedy-western, The Shakiest Gun in the West, released in 1968, the year after McGrath's death. His former Wagon Train costar Terry Wilson also appears with McGrath in The War Wagon and The Shakiest Gun in the West.

== Personal life ==
McGrath married Libby Quay Buschlen (1902–1978), a native of Arthur Ontario, Canada. He died May 13, 1967, aged 64, of a heart attack in Beverly Hills. He was interred at Forest Lawn Memorial Park in Glendale.

== Filmography ==
- 1932: The Rainbow Trail as Horseman (uncredited)
- 1932: Robbers' Roost as Mexican (uncredited)
- 1935: Under the Pampas Moon (uncredited)
- 1940: High School as Student in Fight (uncredited)
- 1941: Western Union as Posse Rider (uncredited)
- 1941: Riders of the Purple Sage as Pete
- 1942: Sundown Jim as Henchman
- 1942: It Happened in Flatbush as Baseball Game Spectator (uncredited)
- 1942: The Man in the Trunk as Photographer (uncredited)
- 1942: The Black Swan as Pirate (uncredited)
- 1942: The Ox-Bow Incident as Posse Member (uncredited)
- 1945: Her Highness and the Bellboy as Brawler (uncredited)
- 1945: They Were Expendable as 'Slim' – Bearded CPO (uncredited)
- 1946: Heldorado as Bearded Man Next to Carnival Jail (uncredited)
- 1948: Alias a Gentleman as Murph (uncredited)
- 1948: Fort Apache as Cpl. Derice (uncredited)
- 1948: Half Past Midnight as Taxi Driver (uncredited)
- 1948: A Southern Yankee as Dispatch Rider (uncredited)
- 1949: Big Jack as Posse Member (uncredited)
- 1949: She Wore a Yellow Ribbon as Bugler / Indian (uncredited)
- 1949: Mighty Joe Young as Cowboy (uncredited)
- 1950: Wagon Master as Posse Member (uncredited)
- 1950: The Flame and the Arrow as Guard (uncredited)
- 1950: Broken Arrow as Barfly (uncredited)
- 1950: Devil's Doorway as Posse Member (uncredited)
- 1950: The Milkman as Man (uncredited)
- 1951: Night into Morning as Irate Driver (uncredited)
- 1951: The Red Badge of Courage as Captain (uncredited)
- 1951: Slaughter Trail as Jamora (uncredited)
- 1951: Across the Wide Missouri as St. Leger (uncredited)
- 1951: Westward the Women as Outrider (uncredited)
- 1953: Ride, Vaquero! as Pete
- 1953: Hondo as Lowe's Partner (uncredited)
- 1954: The Egyptian (uncredited)
- 1956: The Searchers as Texas Ranger (uncredited)
- 1956: The First Texan as Mexican Horseman (uncredited)
- 1956: The Boss as Saloon Patron (uncredited)
- 1957: The Tin Star as Jim Clark – Stagecoach Driver (uncredited)
- 1957: Hell Bound as Detective (uncredited)
- 1965: The Sword of Ali Baba as Pindar
- 1967: Gunfight in Abilene as Ned Martin
- 1967: The War Wagon as Bartender (released posthumously)
- 1967: Tammy and the Millionaire as Uncle Lucius (released posthumously)
- 1967: The Reluctant Astronaut as Plank (released posthumously)
- 1967: The Last Challenge as Ballard Weeks (released posthumously)
- 1968: The Shakiest Gun in the West as Mr. Remington (final film role, released posthumously)
