= Tammy and the Bachelor =

1957 film by Joseph Pevney

- Theatrical release poster
- Directed by: Joseph Pevney
- Screenplay by: Oscar Brodney
- Based on: Tammy Out of Time (1948 novel) by Cid Ricketts Sumner
- Produced by: Ross Hunter
- Starring: Debbie Reynolds; Leslie Nielsen; Walter Brennan; Mala Powers; Sidney Blackmer; Mildred Natwick; Fay Wray; Louise Beavers
- Cinematography: Arthur E. Arling
- Edited by: Ted Kent
- Music by: Frank Skinner
- Production company: Universal-International
- Distributed by: Universal Pictures
- Release date: June 14, 1957
- Running time: 89 minutes
- Country: United States
- Language: English
- Budget: <$1 million
- Box office: $3 million (US and Canada rentals)

Tammy and the Bachelor is a 1957 American romantic comedy film directed by Joseph Pevney and starring Debbie Reynolds as Tambrey "Tammy" Tyree, with Leslie Nielsen, Walter Brennan, Mala Powers, Sidney Blackmer, Mildred Natwick, Fay Wray, and Louise Beavers in supporting roles. It is the first of the four Tammy films. The screenplay by Oscar Brodney is based on the 1948 novel Tammy Out of Time by Cid Ricketts Sumner.

== Plot ==
Tambrey "Tammy" Tyree is a 17-year-old girl living in a houseboat on the Mississippi River at Natchez, Mississippi (within sight of Louisiana), with her Grandpa, John Dinwitty. She runs around barefoot, dreaming of life outside of the swamp, and talking to her best friend, Nan, a goat.

One day a small airplane crashes in the swamp. Tammy and her grandfather go to see what they can salvage from the wreck and find the unconscious pilot, Peter Brent. Tammy and her grandfather help Peter recover at their home, during which time Tammy falls in love with Peter. However, he must return to his own home, but he tells the grandfather that, if anything happened to the grandfather, Tammy would be welcome to come and stay with Peter at his spacious house at Natchez.

Several weeks later, Tammy's grandfather is arrested for making moonshine. With no one else to stay with, Tammy sets off for Brentwood Hall, Peter's home. She arrives during a dance rehearsal and sees Peter with his friends. When Peter's friend Ernie discovers Tammy outside of the party, Tammy tries to explain her grandfather's imprisonment; however, Peter misunderstands and tells Mrs. Brent that Tammy's grandfather has died, leading the Brents to take her in. Tammy learns that Peter is busy with "Brentwood #6", an experimental tomato he is growing in hopes of making Brentwood Hall self-sustaining once again. After Tammy finally tells everyone that her grandfather isn't actually dead, Mrs. Brent is upset over Tammy announcing to everyone that she has a relative in jail. However, Peter and his Aunt Renie convince Tammy to stay, leading her to sing of her love for Peter ("Tammy").

Barbara Bissle, Peter's fiancee, drops by Brentwood Hall. Her uncle wants Peter to stop experimenting with tomatoes and offers him a deal to come to work with him in the advertising business. Peter turns down the offer. That week is also Natchez Pilgrimage Week, which includes a ball and tours of Brentwood Hall, all while in costume. Renie gives Tammy the dress Peter's great-grandmother wore. Mrs. Brent and Renie suggest that Tammy pretend to be Great-Grandmother Cratchett for the evening. At the Ball that night, Tammy tells a story for the guests and enchants everyone, even Mrs. Brent.

That night, a hail storm hits Brentwood Hall and destroys all of the Brentwood #6 plants. The next morning, Peter announces that he is going to accept the advertising offer, leading Tammy to run away back to the bayou. As Peter realizes he loves Tammy, he calls off his engagement with Barbara, then finds Tammy's grandfather and secures his release. The two men then return to the houseboat, where Peter reconciles with Tammy and they kiss.

== Cast ==
- Debbie Reynolds as Tambrey "Tammy" Tyree
- Leslie Nielsen as Peter Brent
- Walter Brennan as Grandpa (John) Dinwitty
- Mala Powers as Barbara Bissle
- Sidney Blackmer as Professor Brent
- Mildred Natwick as Aunt Renie
- Fay Wray as Mrs. Brent
- Philip Ober as Alfred Bissle
- Craig Hill as Ernie
- Louise Beavers as Osia, the cook
- April Kent as Tina

== Production ==
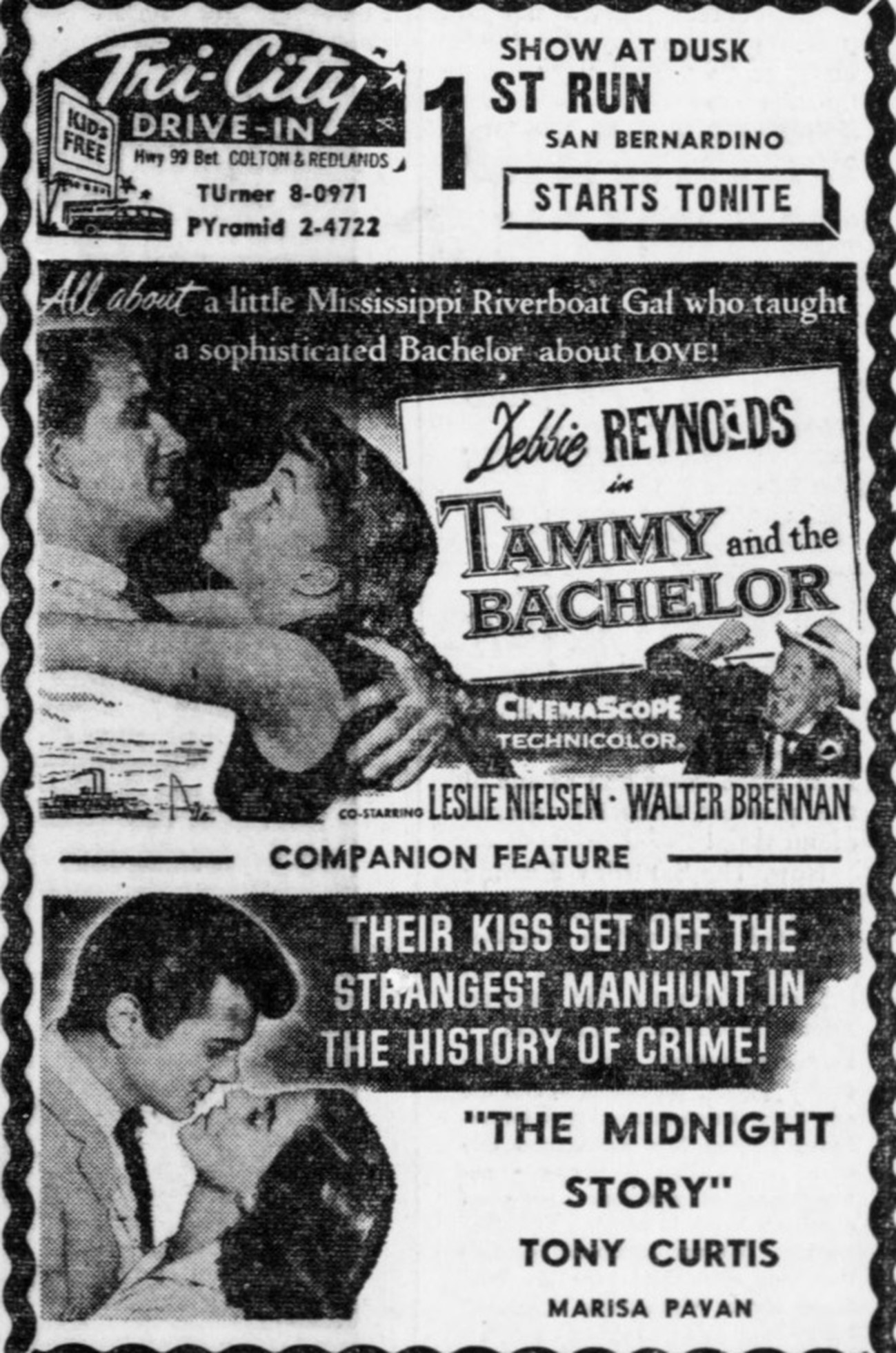
Drive-in advertisement from 1957 for Tammy and the Bachelor and co-feature, The Midnight Story

Leslie Nielsen was borrowed from MGM to play the male lead. Joseph Pevney directed under the first of a new five-picture contract with Universal. Filming began in April 1956.

== Awards ==
Jay Livingston and Ray Evans were nominated for an Oscar for their song "Tammy", sung over the film's main titles by The Ames Brothers. Its naive sentimentality has proved an irresistible target for parody, especially in Stan Freberg's "Madison Ave. Werewolf": "When I hold your sweet, hairy hands tight in mine... Clammy! Clammy!".

Reynolds placed second for a Golden Laurel for Top Female Comedy Performance. The film itself was awarded third place for a Golden Laurel for Top Comedy.

Reynolds's single version of the film's title song (heard later in the film) became an across-the-music-charts #1 hit 45 release, on Coral Records.

== See also ==
- List of American films of 1957
