= Tami (singer) =

American singer

TAMI
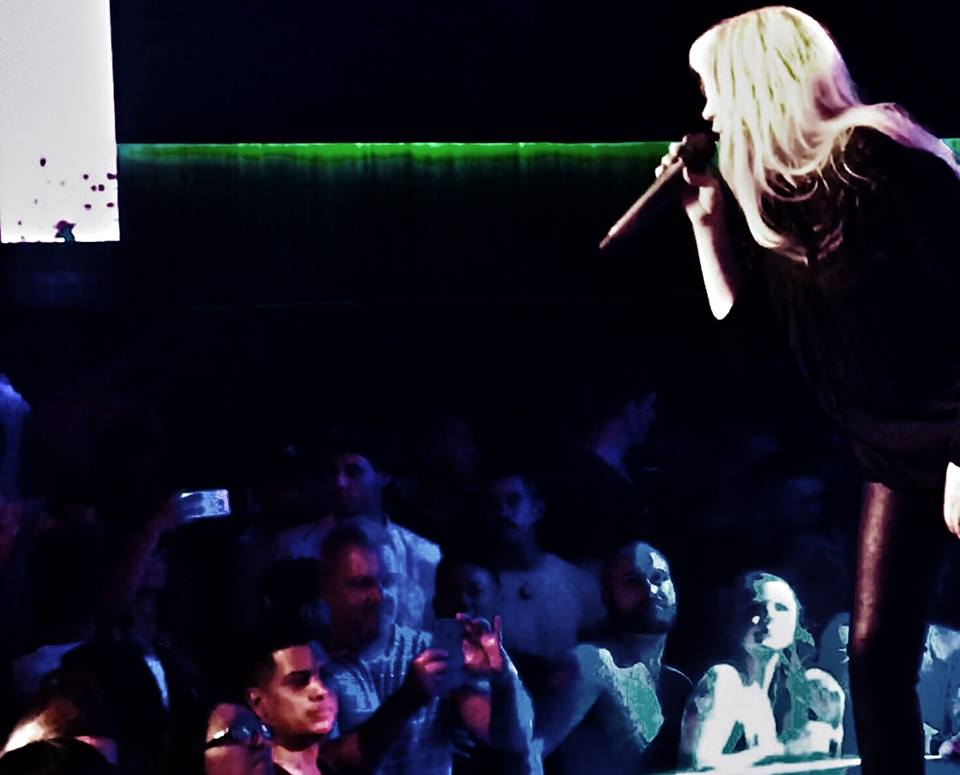
- TAMI performing at Rich's in San Diego
- Born: Tami Lou Spruill; October 24 1964; Fort Worth, Texas, United States JPS Hospital
- Known for: "The Sugar Shack"
- Style: Soul, Blue Eyed Soul, Jazz, R&B, Pop, Dance
- Website: tamimusic.com

TAMI is an American soul/pop/blues singer known for the international hit song "The Sugar Shack". On June 3, 2017, TAMI appeared in Billboard Magazine as the #1 Breakout Artist of the Week. She charted in the United States for 12 weeks on Billboard's Dance Club Songs chart in 2017, peaking at number 11 In July. "The Sugar Shack" also peaked at number 8 in the UK's Music Week, on its Commercial Pop Club Chart, in September 2017.

Tami has spent a large portion of her life in Thailand where the video for The Cure was filmed at Khao Yai National Park, an hour and a half outside of Bangkok.

== Biography ==
Recording Artist TAMI, Tami Lou Spruill, grew up in Oklahoma, United States.

Tami moved to Nashville, Tennessee where she was a Sony Recording Artist. She also worked as a demo singer. While doing demos, she met country music songwriter-producer Bobby Braddock. Braddock went on to produce Tami's 2017 debut album "Velvet & Steel." The album included the singles "The Sugar Shack", and "The Cure", which was written by Chris Stapleton, who added background vocals.

== Career ==
In 2011 TAMI headlined regularly at The Jazz Club in Tianjin, China.

In 2015 TAMI performed regularly in Thailand.

In 2017 TAMI released the hit song The Sugar Shack.

Billboard (magazine) used TAMI's song Maybe Someday in an article and video about the Trans community.

In September 2017 Tami appeared on the U.S. TV show Extra teasing the retro Disco song The Sugar Shack from her upcoming album Velvet and Steel.

In September 2019, Tami made her NYC debut at the Bowery Electric.

== Works ==
- "The Sugar Shack" was written by James House and Beth Hart and produced by Bobby Braddock at Sony Tree Studios Nashville in May 2015.
- "Velvet & Steel" album produced by Bobby Braddock.
