= Tazmin =

Tazmin is a female given name. Notable people with the name include:

- Tazmin Brits (born 1991), South African cricketer
- Tazmin Gray (born 1995), Australian rugby league footballer
