= Tamme =

Tamme may refer to:

== Places in Estonia ==
- Tamme, Pärnu County, village in Lääneranna Parish, Pärnu County
- Tamme, Tartu County, village in Elva Parish, Tartu County
- Tamme, Võru County, village in Võru Parish, Võru County
- Tammelinn, neighbourhood in Tartu
- Kabala, Rapla County (formerly known as Tamme), village in Rapla Parish, Rapla County

== People with the surname ==
- Ants Tamme (born 1940), Estonian politician and journalist
- Heidy Tamme (born 1943), Estonian singer
- Jacob Tamme (born 1985), American football player
- Rein Tamme (1940–2024), Estonian civil engineer and politician
- Villu Tamme (born 1963), Estonian punk musician (J.M.K.E.)

== Other uses ==
- Tamme Stadium, stadium in Tartu, Estonia

== See also ==
- Tamm (disambiguation)
