= Tammy (song) =

Single by Debbie Reynolds
- B-side: "French Heels"
- Released: June 1957
- Recorded: 1957
- Genre: Traditional pop
- Length: 3:00
- Label: Coral
- Songwriters: Jay Livingston, Ray Evans
- Producer: Joseph Gershenson

Debbie Reynolds singles chronology
"The Tender Trap" (1956)	"Tammy" (1957)	"A Very Special Love" (1957)

"Tammy" is a popular song with music by Jay Livingston and lyrics by Ray Evans. It was published in 1957 and made its debut in the film Tammy and the Bachelor. It was nominated for the 1957 Oscar for Best Original Song. "Tammy" is heard in the film in two versions. The one that became a No. 1 hit single for Debbie Reynolds in 1957 is heard midway through the film and was a UK No. 2 hit single in the same year. The other version can be heard during the main titles at the beginning of the film and was a hit for the Ames Brothers. There have been numerous other recordings of the song.

The song's title served as the inspiration for Berry Gordy's first record label. In 1959 Gordy set up a new record company and wanted to call it "Tammy Records" after the song, but the name was taken and "Tamla" was chosen instead. The main Motown label was created later that year, and the two labels were incorporated into the Motown Record Corporation in 1960. Tamla served as a primary R&B and soul subsidiary throughout Motown's existence.

== Debbie Reynolds version ==
The most popular version, by actress and singer Debbie Reynolds, was released by Coral Records as catalog number 61851. The backing orchestrations were arranged by Joseph Gershenson. It first reached the Billboard charts on July 22, 1957, and peaked at No. 1 on all the U.S. charts: the Disk Jockey chart, the Best Seller chart, and the composite chart of the top 100 songs. The single earned Reynolds a gold record. "Tammy" is featured in the films The Long Day Closes, The Big Lebowski, and Fear and Loathing in Las Vegas, and it was sampled in the song "A Different Feeling" by Australian electronic band The Avalanches on their 2000 album "Since I Left You".

== Ames Brothers version ==
A recording by the Ames Brothers, heard over the main titles of Tammy and the Bachelor, also charted. The lyrics are slightly altered to be from an interested male's perspective. It was released by RCA Victor Records as catalog number 47-6930 and first reached the Billboard charts on July 22, 1957. On the Disk Jockey chart it peaked at No. 5; on the Best Seller chart at No. 24; on the composite chart of the top 100 songs it reached No. 29. On the Cash Box charts, where all versions were combined, the song reached No. 1.

== Other versions ==
- Sandra Dee sang Tammy in the 1963 movie "Tammy And The Doctor"
- Polly Bergen sang "Tammy" on the premiere episode of her short-lived 1957–1958 comedy/variety show, The Polly Bergen Show, aired on NBC on September 21, 1957.
- Hank Garland recorded an instrumental version on his album Velvet Guitar in 1959.
- Ray Conniff recorded an orchestral version in 1960
- Sam Cooke recorded a version for his 1957 album, Around the World.
- Bing Crosby recorded the song in 1957 for use on his radio show and it was subsequently issued on the CD New Tricks – 60th Anniversary Deluxe Edition (2017).
- Chet Atkins released a guitar-based instrumental version of the song with his 1961 record Chet Atkins' Workshop. This version features a fingerstyle arrangement, as well as a fairly prominent tremolo sound added to Atkins' electric guitar. This is one of the few instances where Atkins used this particular electronic effect for a recording.
- Andy Williams released a version on his 1962 album, Danny Boy and Other Songs I Love to Sing.
- Sergio Franchi returned to England in 1963 to record this song with conductor Wally Stott on his RCA Victor Red Seal album, Women in My Life.
- A Trini Lopez version of "Tammy" was recorded for his LP The Love Album (Reprise Records R-6165).
- In 2002, the song was recorded by Michael Feinstein for his album, Livingston And Evans Songbook.
- Swedish singer-songwriter Jens Lekman recorded a version of the song on his 2005 Australian tour EP You Deserve Someone Better Than a Bum Like Me.
- Olivia Newton-John has stated that her performance of "Hopelessly Devoted to You" in the movie Grease is inspired by Debbie Reynolds' performance of "Tammy" in Tammy and the Bachelor.
- Nancy Sinatra covered the song in 1963.
- A spare instrumental version was used in the youth dance scene at the end of the landmark Danish film Tree of Knowledge.
- It was recorded by the Graham Bond Organisation on its The Sound of '65 album.
- After seeing the film Tammy and the Bachelor at the age of 12, Thomasina Montgomery changed her name to 'Tammy' and would later become Motown singer Tammi Terrell.
- Slim Whitman also recorded a version of the song for the album Slim Whitman Sings (1962).
- The Avalanches sampled the song in their track "A Different Feeling" from their album Since I Left You.
- Stan Freberg parodied the song in the sketch Gray Flannel Hat Full of Teenage Werewolves: "When I hold your sweet hairy hand tight in mine... Clammy! Clammy!"
- A piano version of "Tammy" is played by an Omega Theta Pi member in the opening scene of the 1978 film National Lampoon's Animal House.
- Welsh singer Mary Hopkin issued a recording of the song on an EP in 1969.

British singer Dennis Lotis also recorded a version in 1957.
