= Debbie Watson (actress) =

American actress

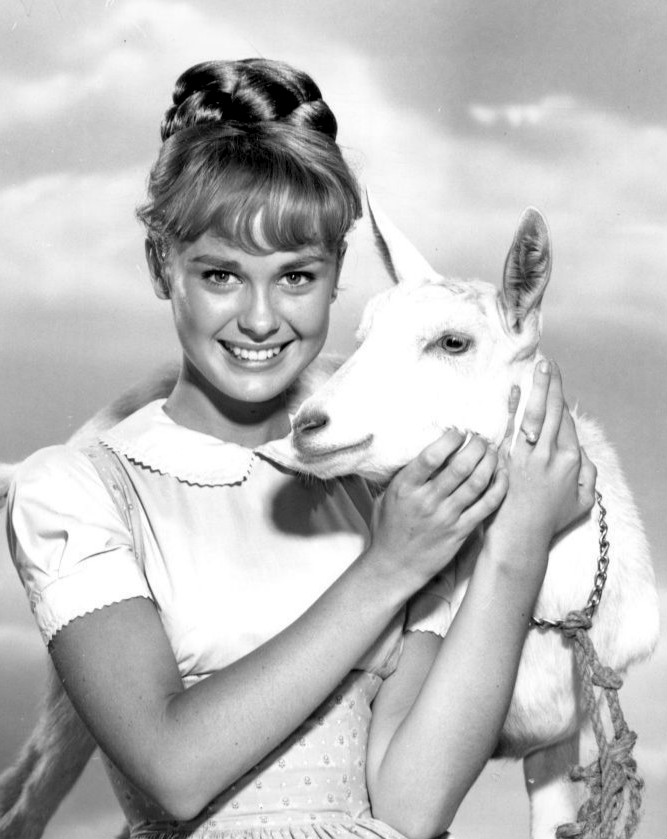
- Watson as Tammy in 1965.
- Born: January 17, 1949 (age 77); Culver City, California
- Years active: 1964–1971
- Spouse: Richard Sanford Orshoff (m. 1966)

Debbie Watson (born January 17, 1949) is a retired American movie and television actress.

== Early years ==
Watson was born on January 17, 1949, in Culver City, California, the daughter of Gene and Kitty Watson. The family later moved to La Mirada, California, and she attended Buena Park High School

== Career ==
Watson began her acting in community theater, appearing in productions at Long Beach Community Theater, Tustin Community Theater, and Melodyland Theater.

=== Television ===
Watson got her start on television as a hopeful on Ted Mack and the Original Amateur Hour in 1963. She went on to star as the boy-struck teenage girl Karen Scott in the 1964 situation comedy television series Karen, the only portion of the largely unsuccessful 90 Bristol Court (which also included Harris Against the World and Tom, Dick and Mary) to last the entirety of the 1964-1965 season. She then appeared as Tammy Tarleton in the 1965 rural-themed sitcom TV series Tammy, with co-stars Denver Pyle and Frank McGrath.

Watson had a role in Love, American Style in 1971 before retiring from acting. In 2003, she appeared in A&E's Biography episode of The Munsters.

=== Film ===
Watson's film appearances include the character of Marilyn Munster in Munster, Go Home! in 1966. The actress was a Universal Pictures starlet at the time, and the studio used Watson to replace Pat Priest, who had played Marilyn through most of The Munsters TV sitcom series. In 1967, Watson co-starred with Roddy McDowall in The Cool Ones, followed by Tammy and the Millionaire, which comprised four episodes of Tammy re-edited into a feature-length film.

== Personal life ==
Aged 17, Watson married record producer-engineer Richard Sanford-Orshoff.

== Television series ==
- Karen (1964–65)
- Tammy (1965–66)
- Mr. Terrific (1967)
- The Virginian (1967,1969)
- Love, American Style (1970-1971)

== Filmography ==
- Munster, Go Home! (1966)
- Tammy and the Millionaire (1967), four episodes of Tammy re-edited into a feature film
- The Cool Ones (1967)
