= Karl (surname) =

Karl is a surname. Notable people with the surname include:

- Alexander Karl, Duke of Anhalt-Bernburg (1805–1863), German prince of the House of Ascania
- Allan Karl, American author, adventurer and speaker
- Alois Karl (born 1950), German lawyer and politician from Bavaria
- Andy Karl (born 1973), American actor and singer
- Andy Karl (baseball) (1914–1989), American baseball player
- Arny Karl (1940–2000), American landscape painter
- Barry Dean Karl (1927–2010), American educator
- Beatrix Karl (born 1967), Austrian academic, politician and government minister
- Benjamin Karl (born 1985), Austrian Olympic snowboarder
- Coby Karl (born 1983), American basketball player
- David Karl (born 1950), American microbial biologist and oceanographer
- Elfriede Karl (born 1933), Austrian politician
- Ernst Karl (1945–2001), Austrian police officer convicted of murder
- Franz Karl (disambiguation), several people
- Frederick Karl (disambiguation), several people
- Fritz Karl (born 1967), Austrian actor
- George Karl (born 1951), American basketball coach
- Günther Karl (born 1949), German Olympic rower
- Jean E. Karl (1927–2000), American novelist
- Jerry Karl (1941–2008), American racing driver
- Jonathan Karl (born 1968), American political journalist
- Markus Karl (born 1986), German footballer
- Martin Karl (1911–1942), German Olympic rower
- Mary Brennan Karl (1893–1948), American educator
- Mary Cordia Karl (1893–1984), American mathematician
- Raimund Karl (born 1959), Austrian archaeologist, Celticist and historian
- Reinhard Karl (1946–1982), German mountaineer, photographer and writer
- Richie Karl (born 1944), American golfer
- Roger Karl (birth name Roger Trouvé; 1882–1984), French actor
- Scott Karl (born 1971), American baseball player
- Steffen Karl (born 1970), German footballer
- Terry Karl, professor of Latin American Studies at Stanford University
- Thomas R. Karl, climate researcher, director of the U.S. National Centers for Environmental Information 2015–2016
- William Karl, American electrical engineer
- William Karl (bishop) (1915–2019), Indian Anglican cleric, Bishop of Northern Karnataka 1970–1980

== See also ==
- Carl (name)
