= Tamar =

Tamar may refer to:

== Arts, entertainment and media ==
- Tamar (album), by Tamar Braxton, 2000
- Tamar (novel), by Mal Peet, 2005
- Tamar (poem), an epic poem by Robinson Jeffers
- Tamar (painting), an 1847 painting by Francesco Hayez

== People ==
- Tamar (name), including a list of people with the name
- Tamar (Genesis), mother of Perez and Zerah, the twin sons of the biblical Judah
- Tamar (daughter of David), daughter of biblical king David
- Tamar (daughter of David IV), who was married to Manuchihr III of Shirvan (c. 1112) and later became a nun.
- Tamar (goddess), deity in Georgian mythology
- Tamar of Georgia (c. 1166–1213), ruled 1184–1213
- Tamar (daughter of Rusudan of Georgia), also known as Gürcü Hatun (fl. 1237–1286), wife of Kaykhusraw II
- Támar (born 1980), American singer

== Places ==
- Tamar, Hong Kong
  - Tamar station
- Tamar, Mazandaran, Iran
- Tamar, West Azerbaijan, Iran
- Tamar, Yazd, Iran
- Tamar block, Ranchi district, Jharkhand, India
- Tamar, India, Ranchi district, Jharkhand
  - Tamar (Vidhan Sabha constituency)
- Tamar gas field, off the coast of Israel
- Tamar Regional Council, a local government in Israel
- Tamar River, in northern Tasmania, Australia
  - Electoral division of Tamar
- River Tamar, in south west England
- Tamar (valley), the continuation of the Planica valley in the Julian Alps, Slovenia

== Transportation and military ==
- Tamar-class lifeboat, a British lifeboat class
- HMS Tamar, the name of several ships and a naval station
- RM Tamar, a Royal Marines facility in Plymouth, England
- Tamar, and Tamar II, former and current Torpoint Ferry vessels
- Tamar, a GWR Caliph Class locomotive

== Other uses ==
- Projeto TAMAR, a Brazilian non-profit organization
- Tamar FC, a former Australian football club
- Tamar (Lommel), a former Belgian maternity home located in Lommel

== See also ==
- Tamara (disambiguation)
- Tamir (disambiguation)
