= Biumo =

Neighbourhood of Varese, Italy

- Neighbourhood
- Quartiere di Biumo Inferiore e Biumo Superiore
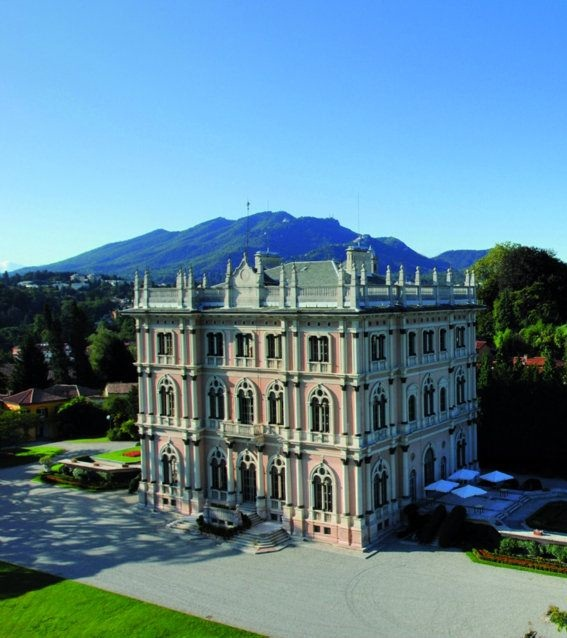
- Villa Ponti
- Interactive map of Biumo
- Coordinates: 45.8226°N 8.8345°E
- Country: Italy
- Region: Lombardy
- City: Varese

Population (2025)
  - Total: 5,000
- Demonym(s): Biumese (singular), Biumesi (plural)

Biumo is a hill neighbourhood of Varese, in the region of Lombardy, Italy, located to the northeast of the city centre. Founded in the early medieval period, it is divided between Biumo Superiore (top of the hill) and Biumo Inferiore (base of the hill).

== History ==
Built as a fortified borgo in the medieval period and located on one of Varese's hills, it was built specifically to serve as a security checkpoint for goods going to Switzerland, Valganna, and Valceresio. It was named after the Biumi family, a noble Milanese family founded by Fusco da Biumo before 1148. It was during this period that it became a frazione of Varese. The neighbourhood is divided into two distinct zones; Biumo Superiore, which is the most recent zone and serves as a residential area, and Biumo Inferiore, erected on the site of the original borgo, and serves as a commercial and a resident area.It was first cited in a document dated from the 10th century as Bimmio de Supra and Bimmio Subto. It was once again cited in a document from the 11th century as Bimi. The name Biumo appeared for the first time in the 14th century. In 1859, Biumo was the site of the Battle of Varese, fought between the army of Giuseppe Garibaldi and the army of the Austrian Army.

== Monuments ==
=== Biumo Inferiore ===
- The Church of San Pietro and San Paolo: Construction began in the 16th century, and was consecrated by Charles Borromeo in 1571. The church was amplified in the 1960s following an increase in the population of Biumo Inferiore. Construction of the amplification concluded in 1974, and was consecrated by Giovanni Colombo. Located in the centre of Biumo, it has one nave and 4 chapels. The interior was decorated in the 17th century by local painters such as Giovan Mauro della Rovere and Giacomo Pallavicino.
- The Church of Madonnina in Prato: Officially known as The Church of the Nativity of Mary, construction of the church began in the 16th century and was completed in the 18th century. It presents a baroque style. The church was completely restored between 1995 and 1996. A bell tower was added in 1722.
- The Ippodromo Le Bettole: Built in 1911, it is Varese’s only hippodrome. Part of the hippodrome is in the neighbourhood of Sangallo. It replaced a previous one located in Masnago.
- Villa Kevenhüller: A neoclassical villa, designed by Leopoldo Pollack for Johan Emanuel Kevenhüller, an Austrian Noble. It was built on land which used to house the Convent of Santa Teresa. The house was constructed in 1811 and has two façades, one facing Via Walder, and another facing a courtyard. It was subsequently sold to the Bianchi Family, then to the Ponti Family. The house was sold to the comune after the death of the Marquess Gian Felice Ponti, who died in 1967. It is now an apartment building.
- Villa Orrigoni Litta Modignani: Built in the 19th century by Simone Cantoni, it replaced a previous villa which was built in the 1600s. The house had various frescos by Pier Francesco Mazzucchelli and Francesco Cairo, all destroyed when the previous house was demolished. The villa was sold by the Litta Modignani Family to the parish of Biumo Inferiore.

=== Biumo Superiore ===
- The Church of San Giorgio: Built in 1574 and expanded in the 16th/17th century. The interior was decorated by Giuseppe Baroffio and Pietro Antonio Magatti.
- The Church of Sant’Anna: Built before 1755, it has a distinct baroque style. The interior is decorated with several frescos.
- Villa Menafoglio Litta Panza, also known as Villa Panza: Erected in the second half of the 18th century by orders of the Marquess Paolo Antonio Menafolgio, its construction concluded in 1766. Due to financial issues, the Menafoglio family sold the villa to Benigno Rossi. The villa was sold to Pompeo Litta Biumi in 1823. In 1829, the architect Luigi Canonica expanded and amplified the villa. During the battle of Varese, the villa was used as a hospital. After the death of Pompeo, the villa was inherited by his son, Antonio. In 1901, it was inherited by Henry Prior, and in 1935, the villa was bought by Ernesto Panza, Count of Biumo. His son, Giuseppe Panza, gave the villa to the FAI in 1996. The Villa now houses an important collection of Contemporary art.
- The Ville Ponti: A collection of villas built by the Ponti family between the 17th and 19th centuries. The most important of these is the Villa Andrea Ponti. Built between 1858 and 1859, it was designed by Giuseppe Balzaretto. The structure was inspired by the Ca' Vendramin Calergi, in Venice. The villa's interior was decorated by some of the most important painters and artists of the time, such as Giuseppe Bertini, Odoardo Tabacchi, and Alessandro Focosi. It has hosted some of Italy's most important figures, such as Umberto I of Italy in 1879, and Umberto II of Italy in 1923.
- Villa Mozzoni, also known as the Villa of the four columns: Designed by Tebaldo Pellegrini and built in the early 19th century, it was commissioned by the Bernasconi family. The Villa has a courtyard and a garden featuring an Italian garden and an English garden.

== Gallery ==
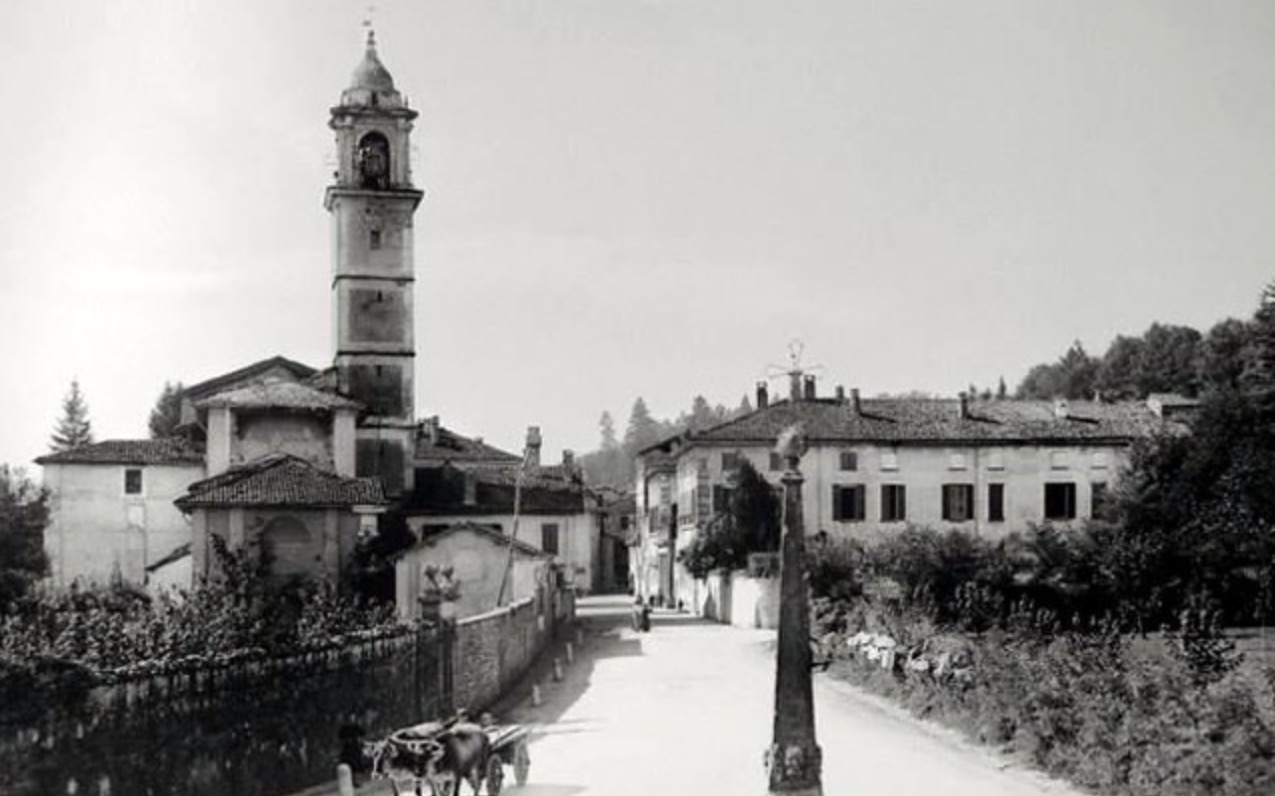
Biumo Inferiore in 1897

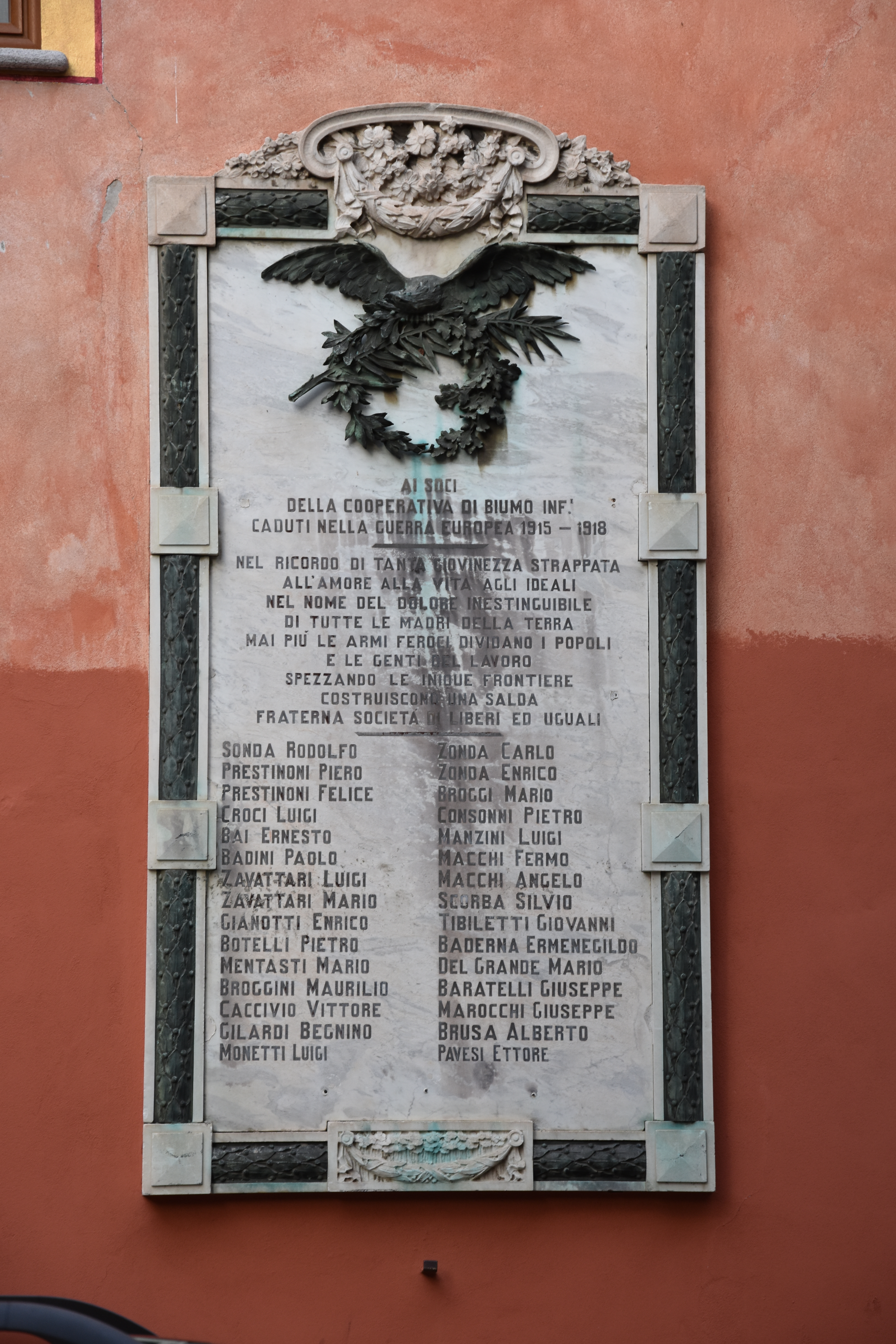
The war memorial of Biumo Inferiore

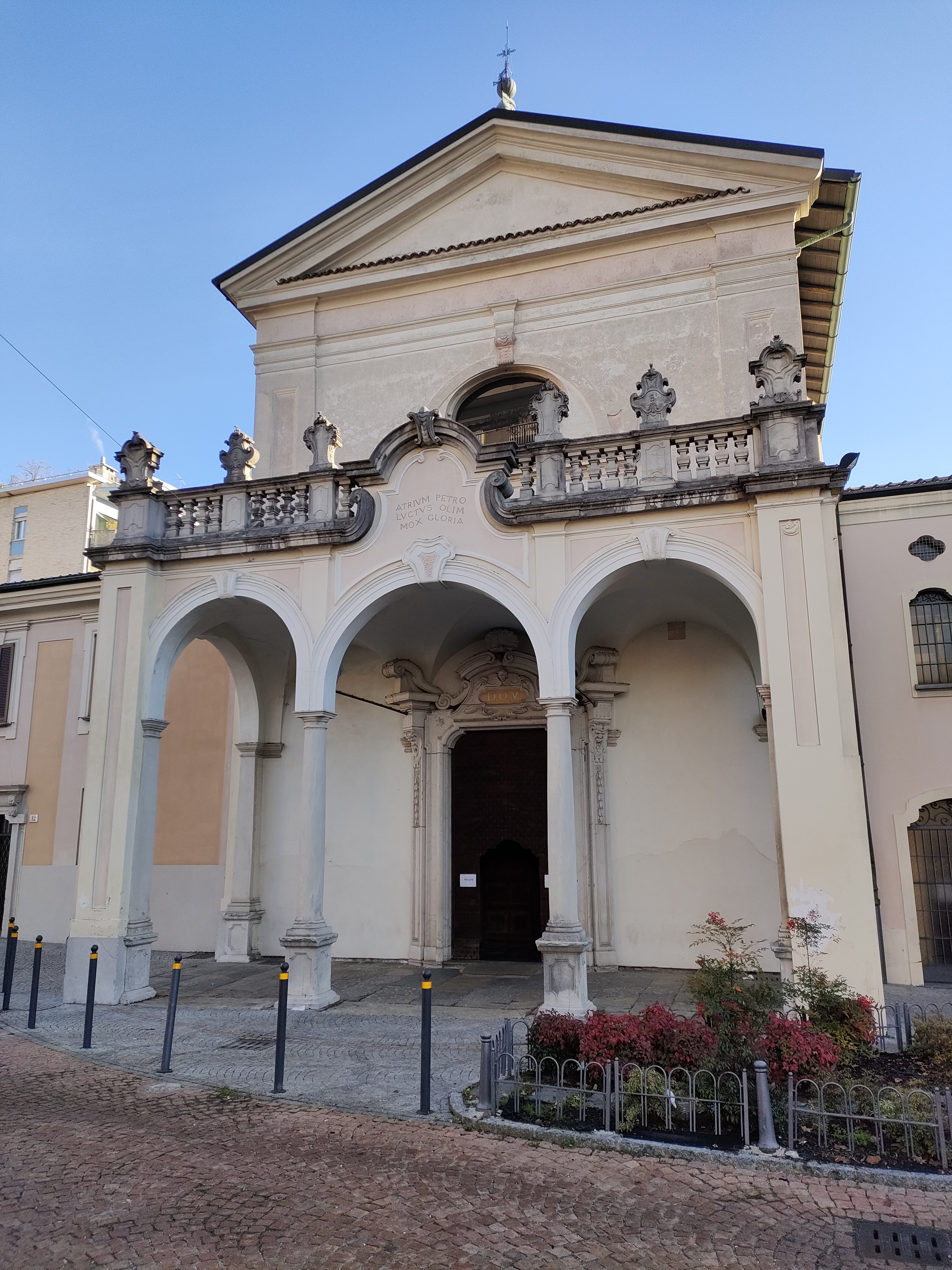
The Church of Santi Pietro e Paolo

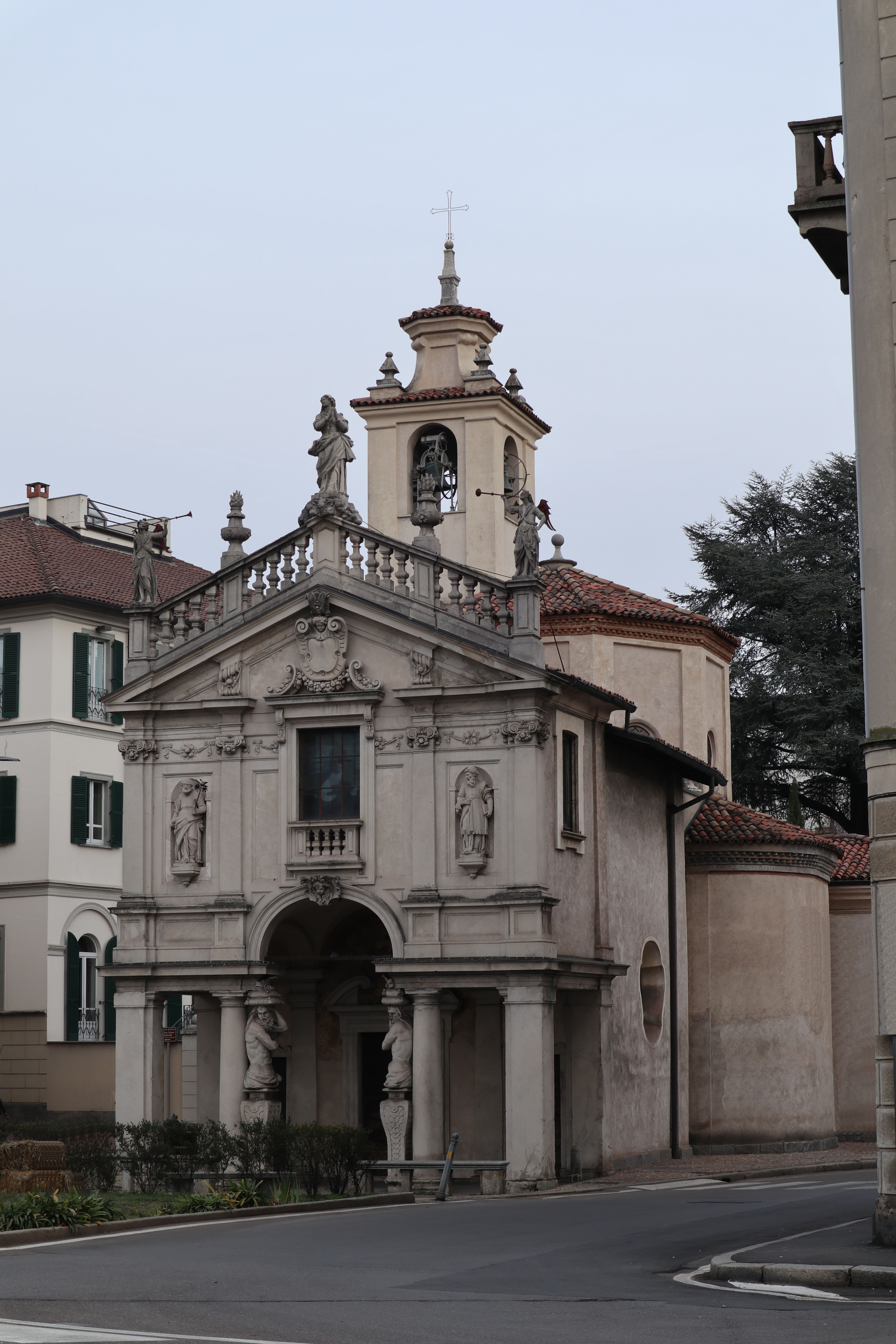
Madonnina in Prato

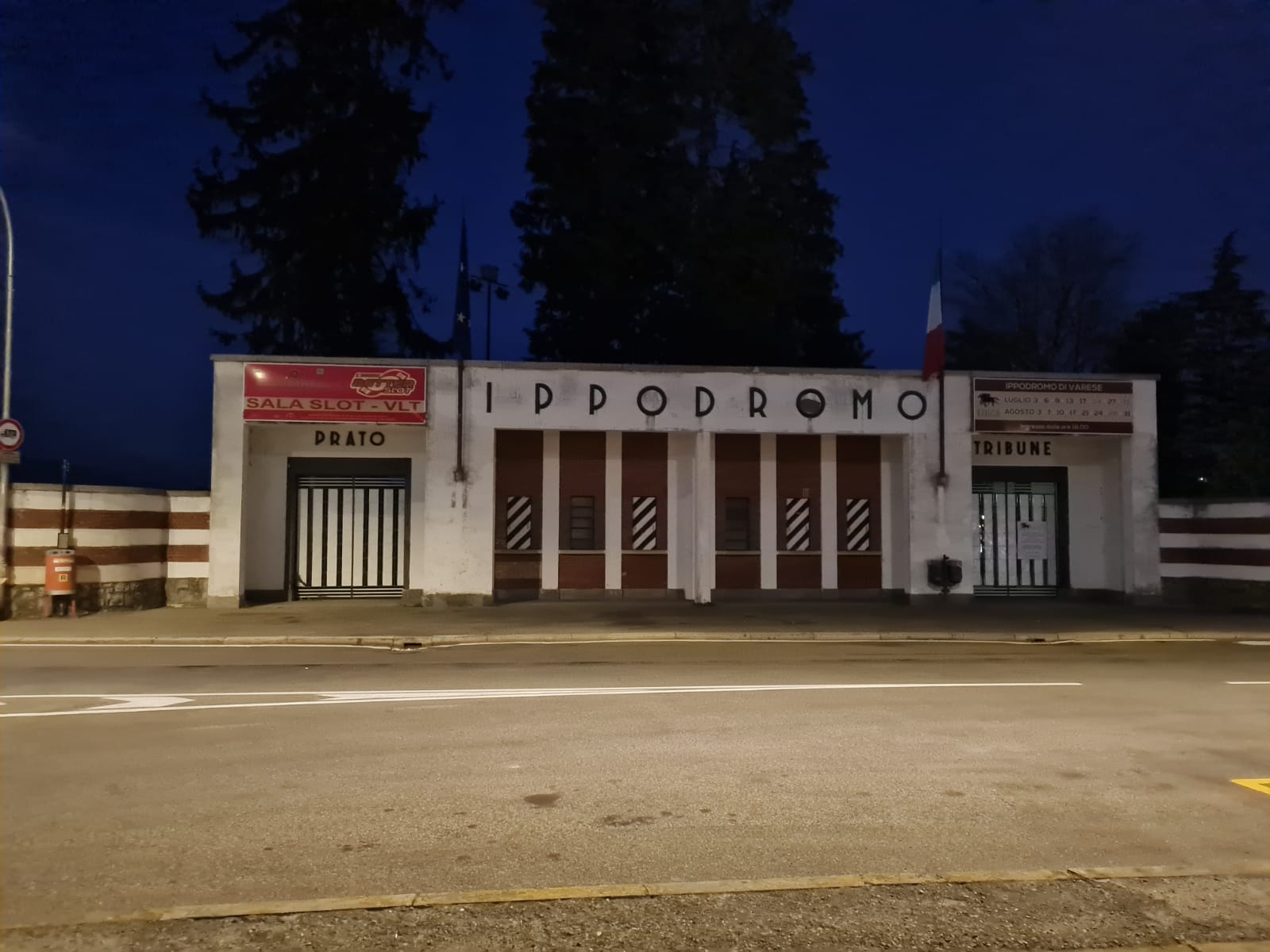
The hippodrome

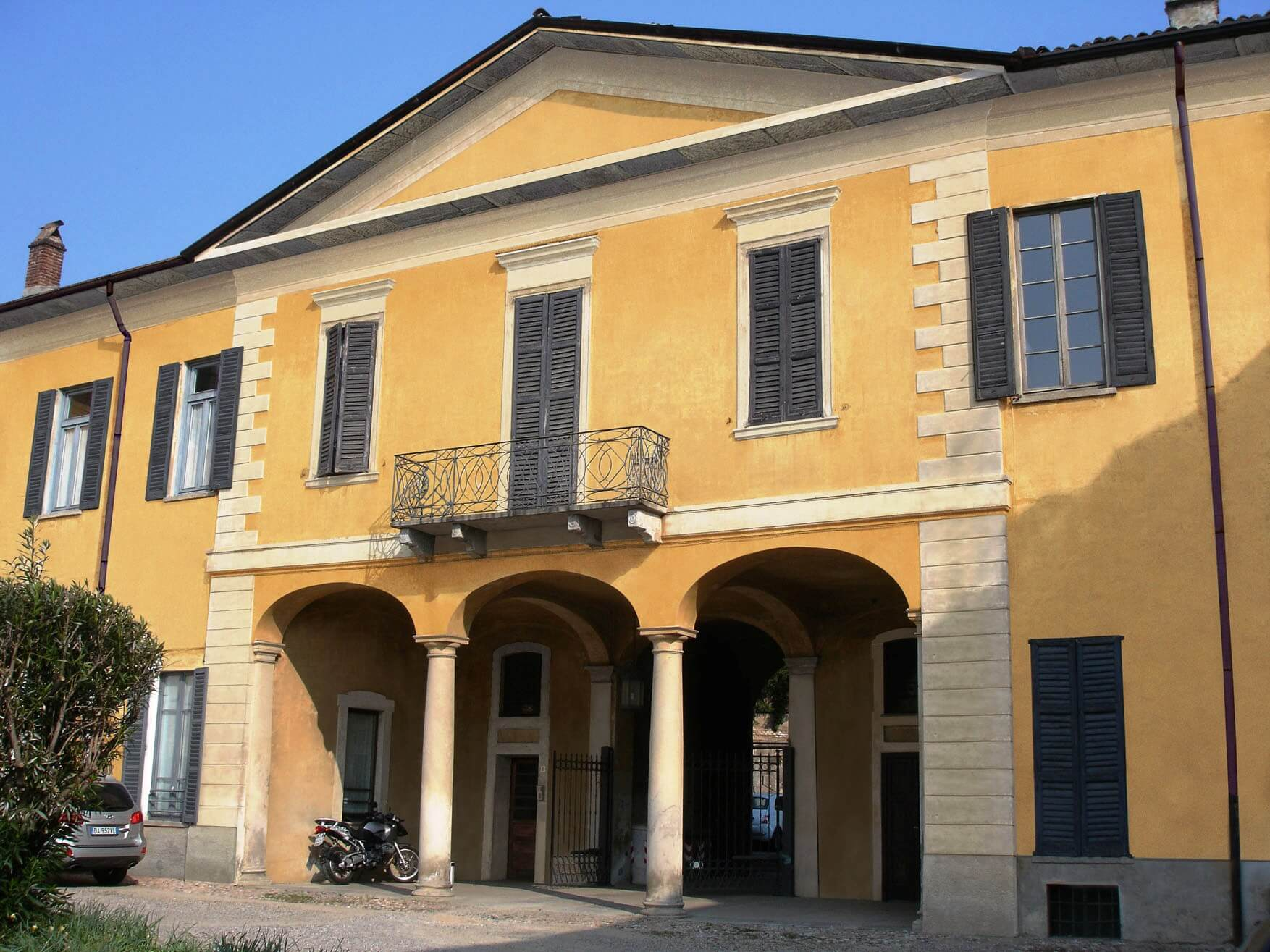
Villa Kevenhüller

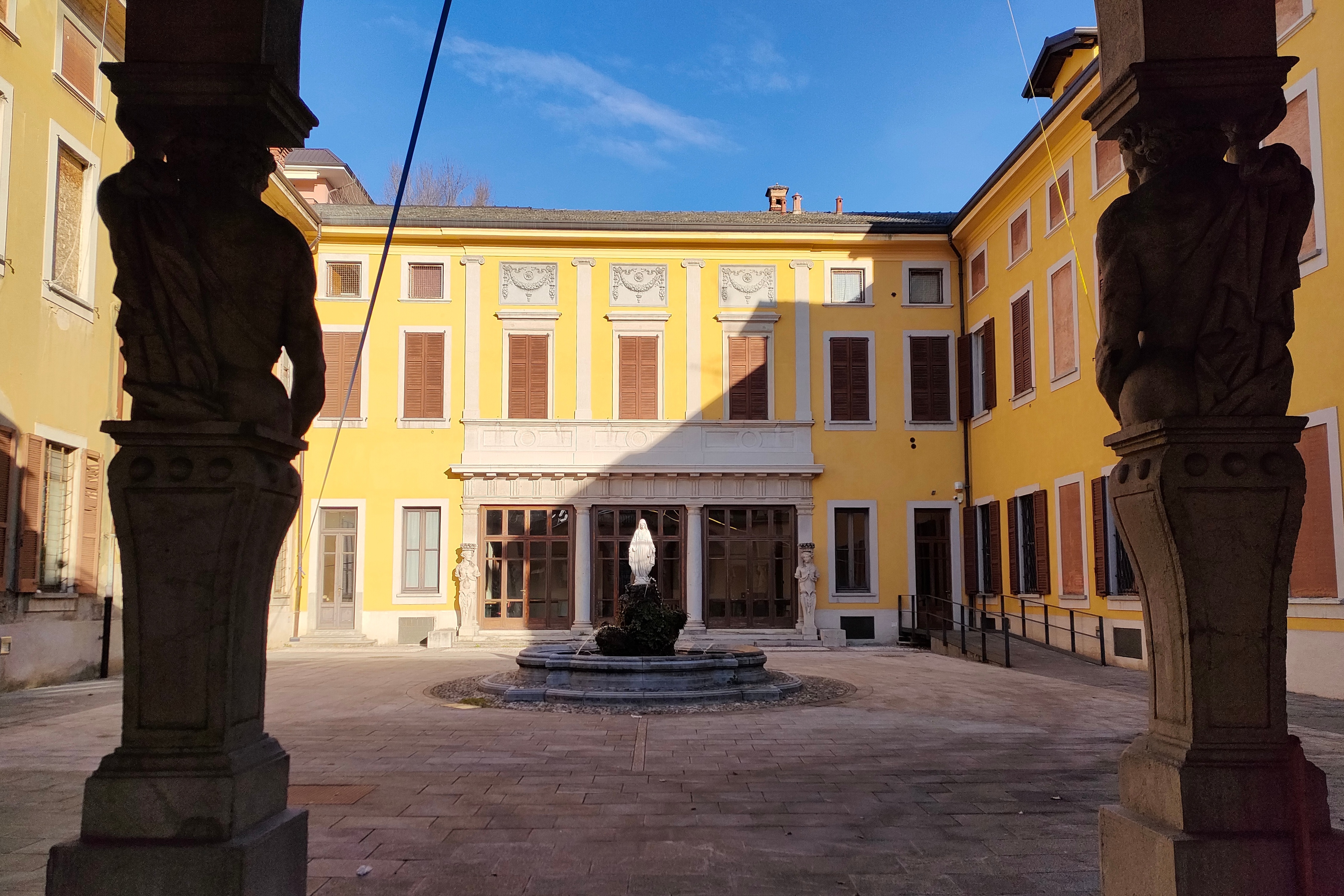
Villa Orrigoni Litta Modignani

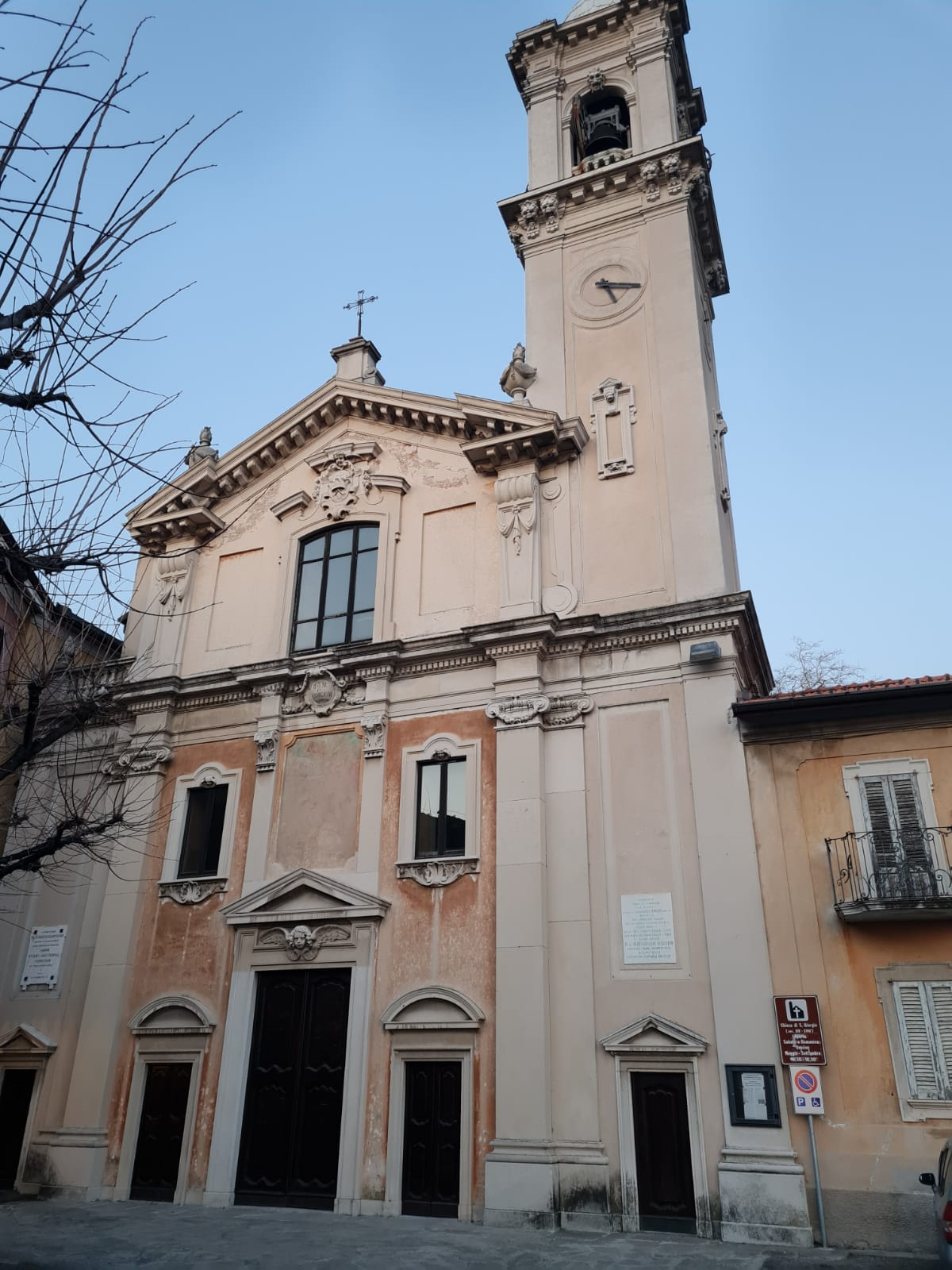
The church of San Giorgio

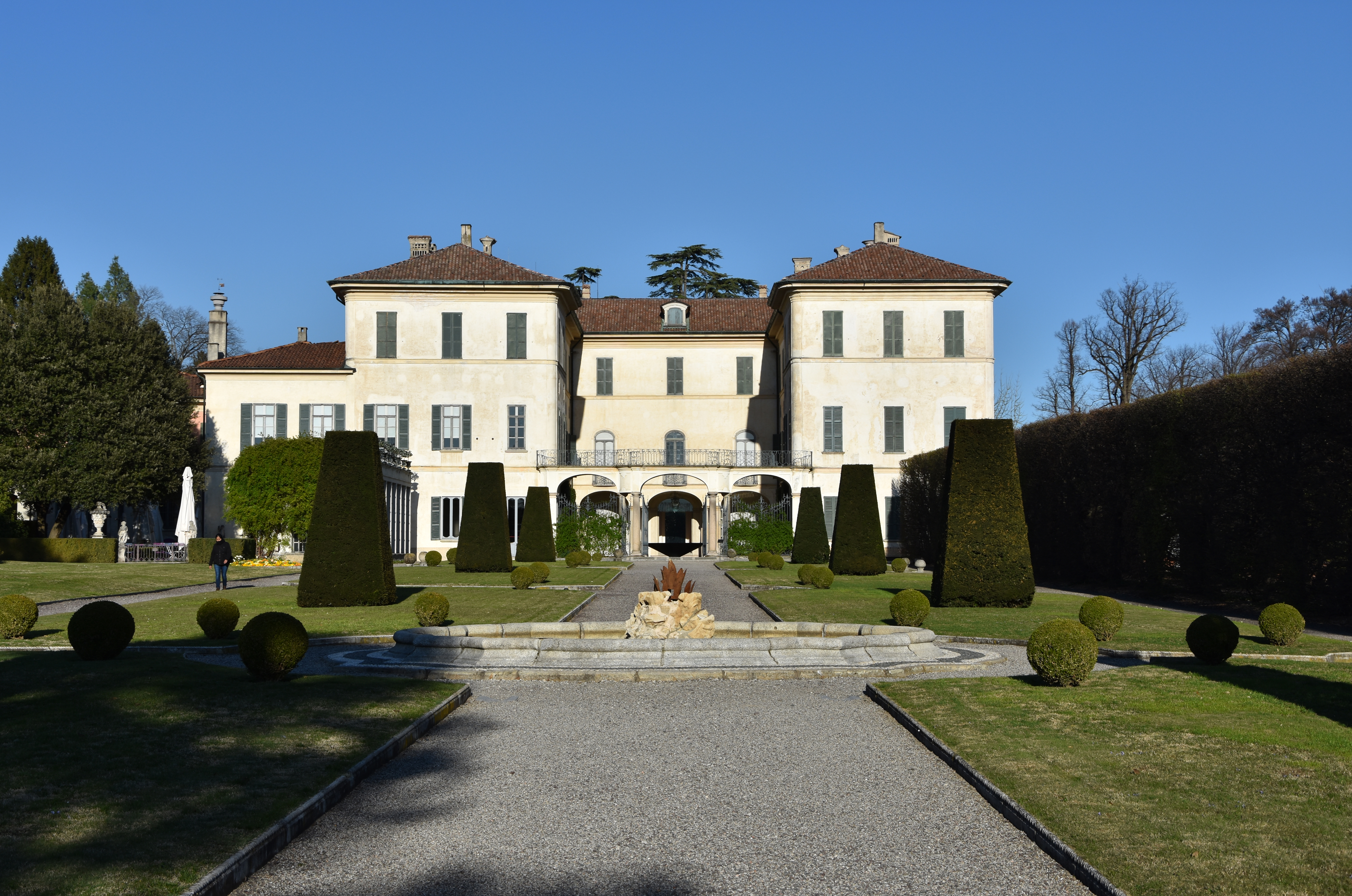
Villa Panza
