= Carl Friedrich (disambiguation) =

Carl Joachim Friedrich was a German-American professor and political theorist.

Carl Friedrich may also refer to:

- Carl Friedrich Abel (1723–1787), German composer
- Carl Friedrich Bruch (1789–1857), German ornithologist
- Carl Friedrich Christian Fasch (1736–1800), German composer and harpsichordist
- Carl Friedrich Gauss (1777–1855), German mathematician and scientist
- Carl Friedrich Goerdeler (1884–1945), conservative German politician
- Carl Friedrich Heinrich Credner (1809–1876), German geologist
- Carl Friedrich Heinrich, Graf von Wylich und Lottum (1767–1841), Prussian infantry general and minister of the State
- Carl Friedrich Meerwein (1737–1810), German civil engineer and aviation pioneer
- Carl Friedrich Nägelsbach (1806–1859), German classical scholar
- Karl Friedrich Otto Westphal (1833–1890), German neurologist and psychiatrist
- Carl Friedrich Philipp von Martius (1794–1868), German botanist and explorer
- Carl Friedrich Richard Förster (1825–1902), German ophthalmologist
- Carl Friedrich Roewer (1881–1963), German arachnologist
- Carl Friedrich von Ledebour (1785–1851), German-Estonian botanist
- Carl Friedrich von Siemens (1872–1941), German entrepreneur and politician
- Carl Friedrich von Weizsäcker (1912–2007), German physicist and philosopher
- Carl Friedrich Wenzel (circa 1740–1793), German chemist and metallurgist
- Karl Friedrich Wilhelm, Prince of Leiningen (1724–1807), German nobleman
- Carl Friedrich Wilhelm Alfred Fleckeisen (1820–1899), German philologist and critic
- Carl Friedrich Zelter (1758–1832), German composer, conductor and teacher of music
- Carl Gustav Friedrich Hasselbach (1809–1882), member of the Prussian House of Lords
- Georg Amadeus Carl Friedrich Naumann (1797–1873), German mineralogist and geologist
- Hans Carl Friedrich von Mangoldt (1854–1925), German mathematician
- Johann Carl Friedrich Dauthe (1746–1816), German architect and etcher
- Johann Carl Friedrich Rellstab (1759–1813), German composer, writer, music publisher, and critic
- Otto Carl Friedrich Westphal (1800–1879), prominent physician

== See also ==
- Karl Friedrich (disambiguation)
- Carl Frederick (given name)
- Friedrich Carl (disambiguation)
