= Johannes Laurentius Weiss and companions =

German missionary priest, martyr

Blessed Johannes Laurentius Weiss OFM

Martyr
- Born: 4 January 1675; Konnersreuth, Bavaria, Germany
- Died: 3 March 1716 (aged 41); Gondar, Ethiopia
- Venerated in: Roman Catholic Church
- Beatified: 20 November 1988, Saint Peter's Basilica by Pope John Paul II
- Feast: 3 March; 4 March (Franciscans)
- Attributes: Franciscan habit

Blessed Michele Pio Fasoli OFM

Martyr
- Born: 3 May 1676; Zerbo, Lombardy, Italy
- Died: 3 March 1716 (aged 39); Gondar, Ethiopia
- Venerated in: Roman Catholic Church
- Beatified: 20 November 1988, Saint Peter's Basilica by Pope John Paul II
- Feast: 3 March, 4 March (Franciscans), 20 November (Pavia)
- Attributes: Franciscan habit

Blessed Antonio Francesco Marzorati OFM

Martyr
- Born: 10 September 1670; Biumo Inferiore, Varese, Italy
- Died: 3 March 1716 (aged 45); Gondar, Ethiopia
- Venerated in: Roman Catholic Church
- Beatified: 20 November 1988, Saint Peter's Basilica by Pope John Paul II
- Feast: 3 March, 4 March (Franciscans), 20 November (Milan)
- Attributes: Franciscan habit

Johannes Laurentius Weiss (religious name Liberat) and his two companions Michele Pio Fasoli and Antonio Francesco Marzorati (religious name Samuele) were German and Italian priests of the Order of Friars Minor. All of them were missionaries. In 1704 they set off from Rome for Cairo to begin their travel through the Nile River to reach Ethiopia. But the team experienced significant pitfalls: conflicts in Ethiopia slowed them down and forced their return to Cairo though the team succeeded in their second attempt to reach their destination. Finally, anti-Catholicism was being fomented there under Miaphysite Orthodox Emperor of Ethiopia Dawit III, who decreed the missionaries, who accepted the Council of Chalcedon, to be nothing more than heretics, which resulted in the three friars being stoned.

The beatification process for the three slain friars launched in 1932 over two centuries following their deaths; the trio were beatified in Rome on 20 November 1988 upon confirmation that the trio died "in odium fidei" (in hatred of the faith).

== Life ==
=== Johannes Laurentius Weiss ===
Johannes Laurentius Weiss was born in Konnersreuth in Bavaria in 1675 as the second of six children.

He was educated in a Cistercian convent in the Upper Palatinate. He entered the Order of Friars Minor at their convent in Graz in Austria on 13 October 1693 and upon his admittance into the order he assumed the name "Liberat". He received his sacerdotal ordination to the priesthood in Vienna on 14 September 1699 from the Cardinal Archbishop of Esztergom Leopold Karl von Kollonitsch. Following his ordination he worked in Langenlois and then in Graz. In 1703 he offered himself to go to the missions but had to undergo training first in order to fulfil this request. Propaganda Fide in Rome named him as such on 4 April 1704 after he underwent a training course for five months in Rome and departed on 1 January 1705 for Cairo to join the group that would go to Ethiopia.

He left Cairo along the Nile River on 14 January 1705 - with seven companions that Father Giuseppe da Gerusalemme was leading - in order to go to Ethiopia to begin their mission. In June the team arrived in Debba in Sudan but were unable to continue due to tensions and so on 21 August took refuge in Allefun. The team remained there until being called to Sennar on 31 March 1708 but over time some of the members died or returned home which left Weiss alone with Giuseppe and with Michele Pio Fasoli. But there was a setback upon Giuseppe's death in May 1709 which later forced Weiss and Fasoli to return to Cairo on 30 June 1710. On 20 April 1711 the officials of Propaganda Fide in Rome asked the two to attempt to travel to Ethiopia once more prompting their departure on 3 November 1711 alongside Antonio Francesco Marzorati; the trio arrived in Gondar on 20 July 1912 to have the emperor Yostos receive them.

=== Michele Pio Fasoli ===
Michele Pio Fasoli was born in Zerbo in Pavia in 1676.

He entered the Order of Friars Minor in Lugano in Switzerland on 5 March 1792 and upon his admittance selected the name "Samuele". Propaganda Fide recognized him on 21 January 1704 to be one of their missionaries after he completed a training course to prepare him for his future work.

=== Antonio Francesco Marzorati ===
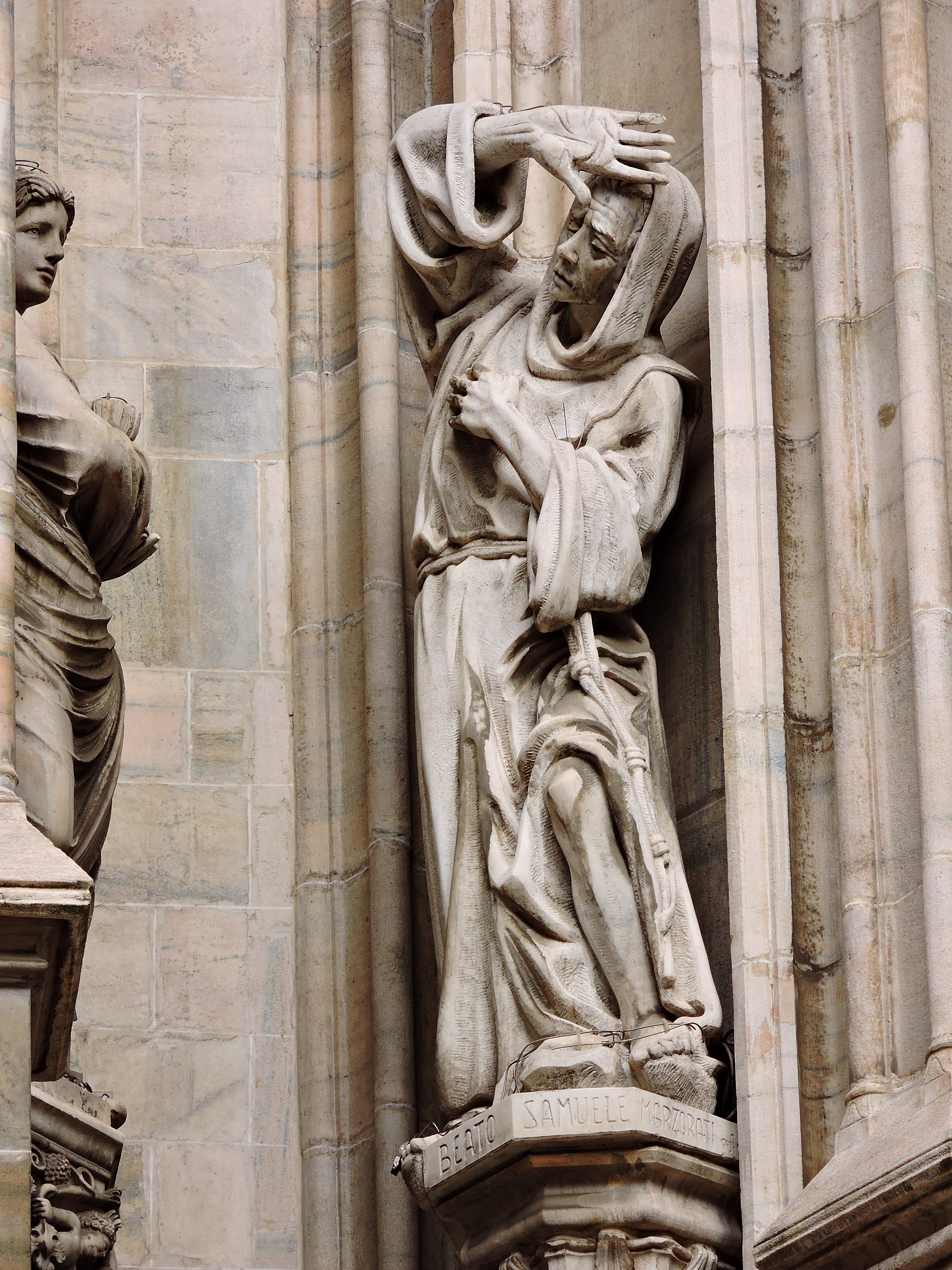
Statue of Marzorati on the Milan Cathedral

Antonio Francesco Marzorati was born in Biumo Inferiore, Varese on 10 September 1670. He arrived first in Cairo on 10 September 1701 after completing a course to prepare him for his work in the foreign missions.

== Deaths ==
Emperor Dawit III (r. 1716–21) claimed that all Catholics were heretics and ordered their immediate persecution; he did not agree with the policies of his predecessor Yostos (r. 1711–16) who allowed missionaries to teach and operate in a small hospital even though he forbade them to preach. The three were arrested on 2 March 1716 and were pressured to renounce the Council of Chalcedon and convert to the Ethiopian Orthodox Church; the trio refused and were publicly stoned to death on 3 March as a result.

== Beatification ==
The beatification process opened under the Cardinal Archbishop of Vienna Theodor Innitzer in November 1932 and who closed the process in March 1943. It was formally opened in Rome on 25 July 1933, granting the friars the title of Servants of God. The official Positio dossier was submitted to the Congregation for the Causes of Saints in Rome in 1984 with historians approving the cause on 16 May 1984 after having assessed the circumstances of their deaths in light of the historical context. Theologians also approved the cause on 15 December 1987 as did the C.C.S. members on 1 March 1988.

The trio were approved for beatification on 28 March 1988 after Pope John Paul II confirmed the three friars were killed "in odium fidei" (in hatred of the faith) and beatified the missionaries on 20 November 1988 in Saint Peter's Basilica.

The current postulator for this cause is the Franciscan priest Giovangiuseppe Califano.
