= Carl Frederick (given name) =

Carl Frederick may refer to:

- Carl Frederick, science fiction author
- Carl Frederick Tandberg (1910–1988), bass fiddle musician
- Carl Frederick Falkenberg
- Carl Frederick Fallen
- Carl Frederick Hempel, composer
- Carl Frederick Mengeling, U.S. Catholic prelate

== See also ==
- Karl Frederick, U.S. sport shooter
- Carl Friedrich (disambiguation)
- Frederick Carl (disambiguation)
