= Tamar (given name) =

Tamar (/ˈteɪmər/; Hebrew: תָּמָר) is a female given name of Hebrew origin, meaning "date" (the fruit), "date palm" or just "palm tree". In the Bible, Tamar refers to two women: one is Tamar the daughter-in-law of Judah, and the other is Tamar the daughter of King David and full sister of Absalom. The latter was raped by her half-brother Amnon, leading Absalom to eventually kill him. Absalom named his daughter Tamar, described as a woman of great beauty. For a period, Tamar held the top spot for girls' names in Israel, but it dropped to second in 2022. As of 2024, Tamar was still ranked in the top 10 as the 4th most common given name.

Tamar was also among the Biblical names used by Puritans in the American Colonial Era in the 17th and 18th centuries. Puritan families sometimes used names of Biblical characters seen as sinful as a reminder of man's fallen state.

== People with the given name Tamar ==
- Tamar (Genesis), daughter-in-law of Judah in the Bible
- Tamar (daughter of David), daughter of King David and full sister of his son Absalom in the Bible
- Tamar, daughter of David's son Absalom
- Tamar of Georgia (1160–1213), queen regnant of the Kingdom of Georgia
- Tamar of Imereti (died 1455), Georgian queen consort of the Kingdom of Georgia
- Tamar of Imereti (died 1556), Georgian queen consort of the Kingdom of Kartli
- Tamar of Kartli (1696–1746), Georgian queen
- Tamar of Mukhrani (died 1683), Georgian princess
- Támar (born 1980), American singer
- Tamar Abakelia (1905–1953), Georgian artist
- Tamar Ariav (born 1949), Israeli professor of education and President of Beit Berl College
- Tamar Amilakhori (fl. 17th-century), Safavid concubine of Georgian origin
- Tamar Beruchashvili (born 1961), Georgian politician
- Tamar Braxton (born 1977), American singer
- Tamar Eilam, Israeli-American computer scientist
- Tamar Garb (born 1957), British art historian
- Tamar Gendler (born 1965), American philosopher
- Tamar Gozansky (born 1940), Israeli politician
- Tamar Halperin (born 1976), Israeli musician
- Tamar Hermann (born 1957), Israeli political scientist
- Tamar Jacoby (born 1954), American writer
- Tamar Kaprelian (born 1986), American singer
- Tamar Katz (born 1988), Israeli figure skater
- Tamar Sanikidze (born 1978), Georgian politician
- Tamar Simon Hoffs (born 1934), American film director
- Tamar Slay (born 1980), American basketball player
- Tamar Tatuashvili (born 1991), Georgian football player
- Tamar Tavadze (1898–1975), Georgian artist
- Tamar Tumanyan (1907–1989), Soviet Armenian architect
- Tamar Zandberg (born 1976), Israeli politician

== Fictional characters ==
- Hilary Tamar, fictional character in the novels of Sarah Caudwell
- Tamar Cauldwell, the central character in the epic poem Tamar by Robinson Jeffers
- Tamar Kir-Bataar, a character from the Grishaverse book series by Leigh Bardugo.

== See also ==
- Tamar (disambiguation)
- Tamara (name)
- Tammy (given name)
