= Tavadze =

Tavadze (Georgian: თავაძე) is a Georgian surname. Notable people with the surname include:

- Dimitri Tavadze (1911–1990), Georgian artist and scenographer
- Giorgi Tavadze (born 1955), Georgian former footballer
- Saba Tavadze (born 1993), Georgian Football midfielder
- Tamar Tavadze (1898–1975), Georgian artist, theatre painter, sculptor and architect
- Zaza Tavadze (born 1975), Georgian judge
