= Frederick Karl =

Frederick Karl may refer to:

- Frederick R. Karl (1927–2004), literary biographer
- Frederick B. Karl (1924–2013), American politician
- Prince Friedrich Karl of Prussia (1828–1885), Prussian prince and military commander during the wars of German unification
- Prince Friedrich Karl of Prussia (1893–1917), German prince and competitive horse rider in the 1912 Olympics

== See also ==
- Frederick Carl (disambiguation)
- Friedrich Carl (disambiguation)
