= Tamir (disambiguation) =

Tamir is a male Hebrew name.

Tamir may also refer to:

- Tamir, Republic of Buryatia, a place in Russia
- Tamir River, in Mongolia
  - Ikh-Tamir, a district
  - Tamir gol mine, an iron mine
- Tamir Airways, an Israeli domestic airline
- Tamir (missile), of the Iron Dome air defense system
- Ottoman name of Namir, Shaykh Maskin

== See also ==
- Tamír Triad, a fantasy book trilogy by Lynn Flewelling
- Tamar (disambiguation)
- Taymyr (disambiguation)
