= Carl Gustav Friedrich Hasselbach =

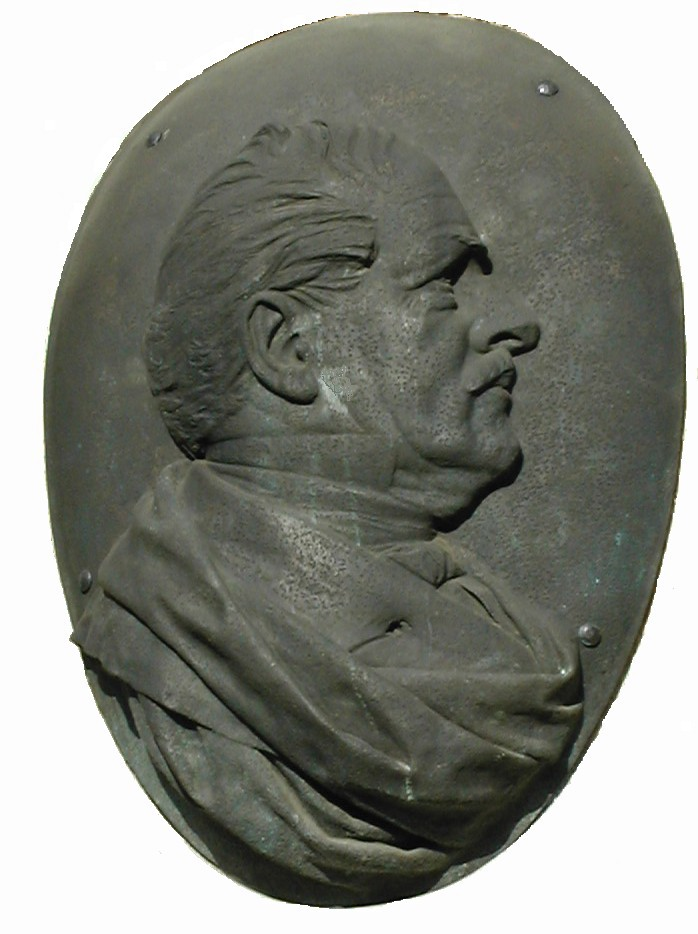
- Portrait medallion of Carl Gustav Friedrich Hasselbach
- Born: 21 March 1809
- Died: 21 April 1882
- Occupation: Politician

Carl Gustav Friedrich Hasselbach (21 March 1809 – 21 April 1882) was a privy councillor, member of the Prussian House of Lords, and served as Lord Mayor of the city of Magdeburg from 1851 to 1881.

== Early life ==
Born in Stettin (Szczecin) to a shipping lawyer, Hasselbach attended school in Stettin, then studied law and public administration at the universities in Göttingen and Berlin.

He entered the Prussian civil service in 1830. Over the next 21 years he would hold various positions at Prussian government offices in Magdeburg, Gumbinnen and Minden.

== Career ==
Hasselbach was elected Mayor of Magdeburg in 1851. A staunch conservative and royalist, Hasselbach was promoted to "Lord" Mayor of Magdeburg in 1854 by King Frederick William IV of Prussia. That promotion made Hasselbach a member of the Prussian House of Lords. He served as a Vice President of the Prussian Upper House from 1872 to 1875.

Hasselbach served as Mayor until 1881, when he retired for health reasons. The city grew dramatically during his tenure. He oversaw several infrastructure projects, including a new waterworks, sewage system, a gas lighting system, a new train station and a new bridge over the Elbe. But his most important development was the physical expansion of the city, granting Magdeburg room to grow its industrial base.

== Personal life ==
Hasselbach married Auguste Cremat in 1837. The couple had five children.

== Honors and recognition ==
The city of Magdeburg erected a monument in Hasselbach's honour at the centre of an important traffic intersection, Hasselbachplatz. The monument was moved in 1927. Damaged during World War II, the monument was eventually restored in the late 1990s.

== Sources ==
- Mathias Tullner, Magdeburger Biographisches Lexikon, Magdeburg 2002, ISBN 3-933046-49-1
- Martin Wiehle, Magdeburger Persönlichkeiten, 1993, Magdeburg, ISBN 3-910146-06-6
