= List of Austrian politicians =

This is a list of Austrian politicians.

== A ==
- Victor Adler, Social democrat
- Hannes Androsch, former vice-chancellor and finance minister (SPÖ)

== B ==
- Cesare Battisti, politician and revolutionary
- Otto Bauer, politician (social democrat)
- Leopold Berchtold, foreign minister at the outbreak of World War I
- Walter Breisky, Chancellor (First Republic)
- Christian Broda, former justice minister (SPÖ)
- Erhard Busek, former vice chancellor and minister of science (ÖVP)
- Doris Bures, former first president of the national council of Austria (SPÖ)

== C ==
- Richard von Coudenhove-Kalergi, politician and writer

== D ==
- Engelbert Dollfuss, Chancellor (First Republic) and dictator from 1933 to 1934

== E ==
- Otto Ender, Chancellor (First Republic)

== F ==
- Leopold Figl, former Chancellor and foreign minister (ÖVP)
- Heinz Fischer, former Austrian President (SPÖ)
- Werner Faymann, former Chancellor of Austria (SPÖ)

== G ==
- Eva Glawischnig-Piesczek, politician (Austrian Green Party)
- Alfons Gorbach, former chancellor (ÖVP)
- Karl-Heinz Grasser, former finance minister
- Katharina Graf, politician of the Social Democratic Workers Party of Austria (SAI)
- Leopold Gratz, former foreign minister and president of the Nationalrat (SPÖ)
- Alfred Gusenbauer, chairman of the Austrian Socialdemocrats (SPÖ)

== H ==
- Jörg Haider, politician, right-wing populist (BZÖ)
- Michael Hainisch, Austrian president (First Republic)
- Michael Häupl, former mayor of Vienna (SPÖ)
- Adolf Hitler, Leader and Chancellor of Germany from 1933–1945
- Norbert Hofer, third president of the national council, former minister of Traffic, Innovation and Technology (FPÖ)

== I ==
- Theodor Innitzer, cardinal, archbishop and minister of the First Republic

== J ==
- Mirjam Jäger-Fischer, former member of the Landtag of Vorarlberg
- Franz Jonas, former Austrian president

== K ==
- Elfriede Karl, former Minister for Family, Youth and Consumer Protection
- Ernst Kaltenbrunner, national socialist politician
- Christian Kern, former Chancellor, current chairman of the SPÖ
- Wenzel Anton Graf Kaunitz, statesman
- Andreas Khol, president of the national council (ÖVP)
- Herbert Kickl, former minister of the Interior (FPÖ)
- Rudolf Kirchschläger, judge, diplomat and former Austrian president
- Josef Klaus, former Chancellor (ÖVP)
- Melchior Klesl, statesman 16th and 17th century
- Thomas Klestil, diplomat and Austrian president
- Viktor Klima, former Chancellor (SPÖ)
- Heinrich Ritter von Kogerer, Director General of the Austro-Hungarian Empire
- Peter Joseph Kofler, former mayor of Vienna
- Theodor Körner, Former Austrian president
- Marie Köstler, nurse, trade unionist and politician (SDAPÖ)
- Bruno Kreisky, former Chancellor (SPÖ)
- Sebastian Kurz, former foreign minister, current chairman of the ÖVP and Chancellor

== L ==
- Karl Lueger, mayor of Vienna before World War I, founder of Christian-social party

== M ==
- Hans-Peter Martin (born 1957), Member of the European Parliament
- Klemens von Metternich (1773 - 1859), Austrian foreign minister, diplomat and statesman
- Wilhelm Miklas, last president of the first Republic
- Alois Mock, former vice chancellor (ÖVP)

== N ==
- Hans Niessl, Landeshauptmann of Burgenland, (SPÖ)

== P ==
- Peter Pilz, politician and founder of the "Liste Pilz"
- Bruno Pittermann, former vice-chancellor SPÖ
- Erwin Pröll, governor of Lower Austria, ÖVP

== R ==
- Julius Raab, former Chancellor (ÖVP)
- Rudolf Ramek, former Chancellor (first Republic)
- Karl Renner, former Chancellor and first Austrian president of the 2nd Republic (SPÖ)
- Susanne Riess, former vice chancellor

== S ==
- Adolf Schärf, former Austrian president
- Johannes Schober, Chancellor (First Republic)
- Georg Ritter von Schönerer, radical German-nationalistic politician in the Habsburg monarchy
- Sophie Schulz, member of the Landtag of Lower Austria
- Kurt Schuschnigg, dictator and Chancellor of Austria from 1934 to 1938
- Wolfgang Schüssel, Chancellor of Austria (ÖVP)
- Arnold Schwarzenegger, 38th Governor of California, United States
- Ignaz Seipel, former Chancellor (First Republic)
- Karl Seitz, Austrian president (First Republic)
- Arthur Seyss-Inquart, national socialist politician, last Chancellor before the Anschluss
- Fred Sinowatz, former Chancellor (SPÖ)
- Gerhard Skiba, Mayor of Braunau am Inn (SPÖ)
- Wolfgang Sobotka, Minister of Interior (ÖVP)
- Heinz-Christian Strache, current Vice Chancellor (FPÖ)
- Ernst Streeruwitz, Chancellor (First Republic)
- Thomas Stelzer, Austrian ambassador to Portugal and Cape Verde

== V ==
- Alexander Van der Bellen, president of Austria, elected as a party-less candidate in 2016
- Franz Vranitzky, former chancellor (SPÖ)

== W ==
- Kurt Waldheim, diplomat and politician; former Secretary-General of the United Nations from 1972 to 1982, former President of Austria from 1986 to 1992 (born 1918)

== See also ==
- Politics of Austria
- Lists of mayors by country: Austria
- List of political parties in Austria
- List of Austrians
