= Tired of Winning =

Tired of Winning may refer to:

- "Tired of Winning" (song), a 2022 song by Nothing More
- Tired of Winning: Donald Trump and the End of the Grand Old Party, a 2023 nonfiction book by Jonathan Karl
