= Church of San Rocco, Busto Arsizio =

Church in Busto Arsizio, Italy

Coordinates: 45.6107°N 8.8467°E

Church of San Rocco
- Chiesa di San Rocco
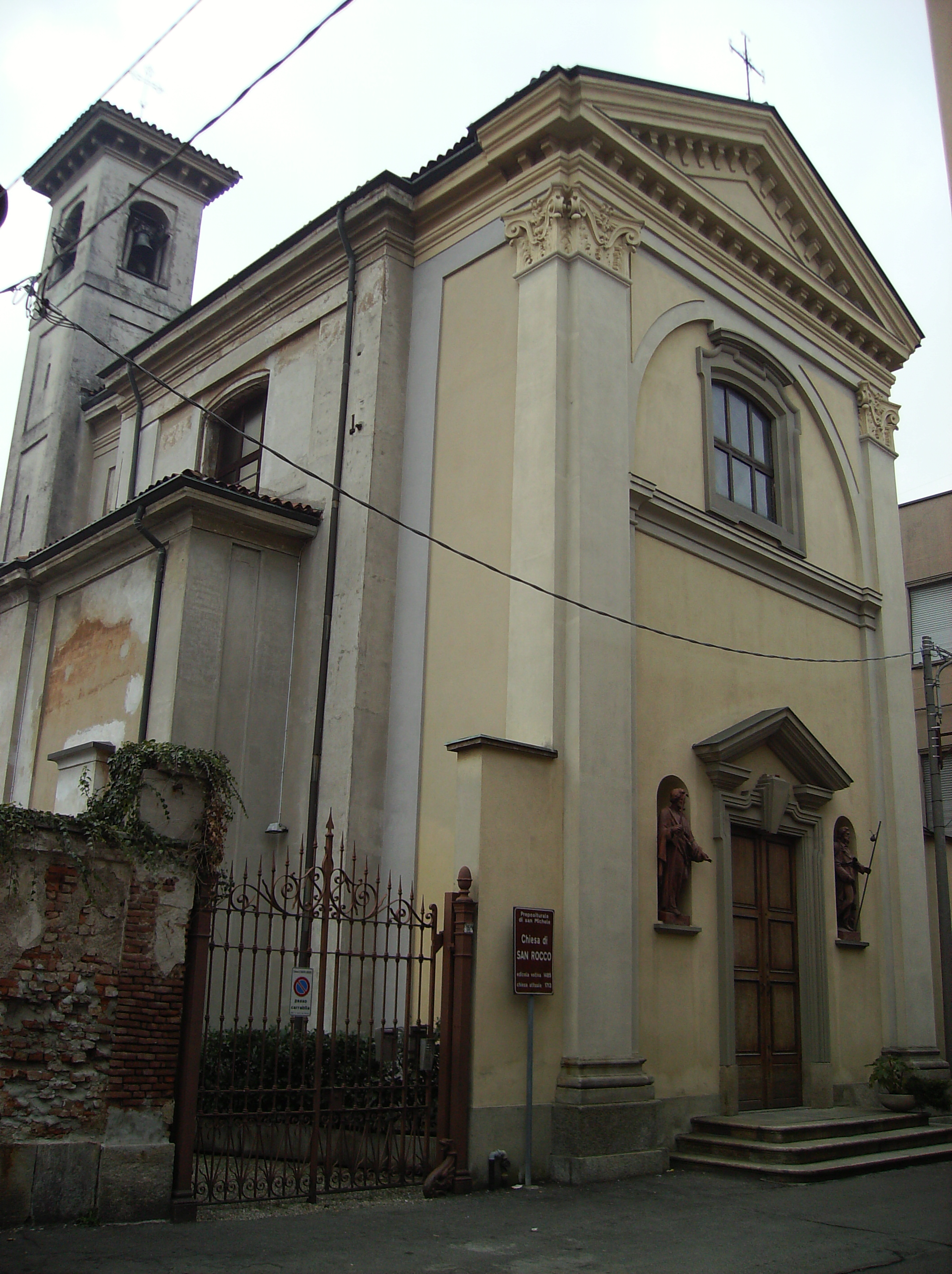
- Church of San Rocco
- Location: Busto Arsizio, Lombardy
- Country: Italy
- Denomination: Roman Catholic

History
- Founded: 1706
- Dedication: Saint Roch
- Dedicated: 1706
- Consecrated: 1730

Administration
- Diocese: Diocese of Milan
- Parish: San Michele Arcangelo

The Church of San Rocco is a church located in Busto Arsizio, near Piazza Giuseppe Lualdi. It is a part of the parish of San Michele Arcangelo

== History ==
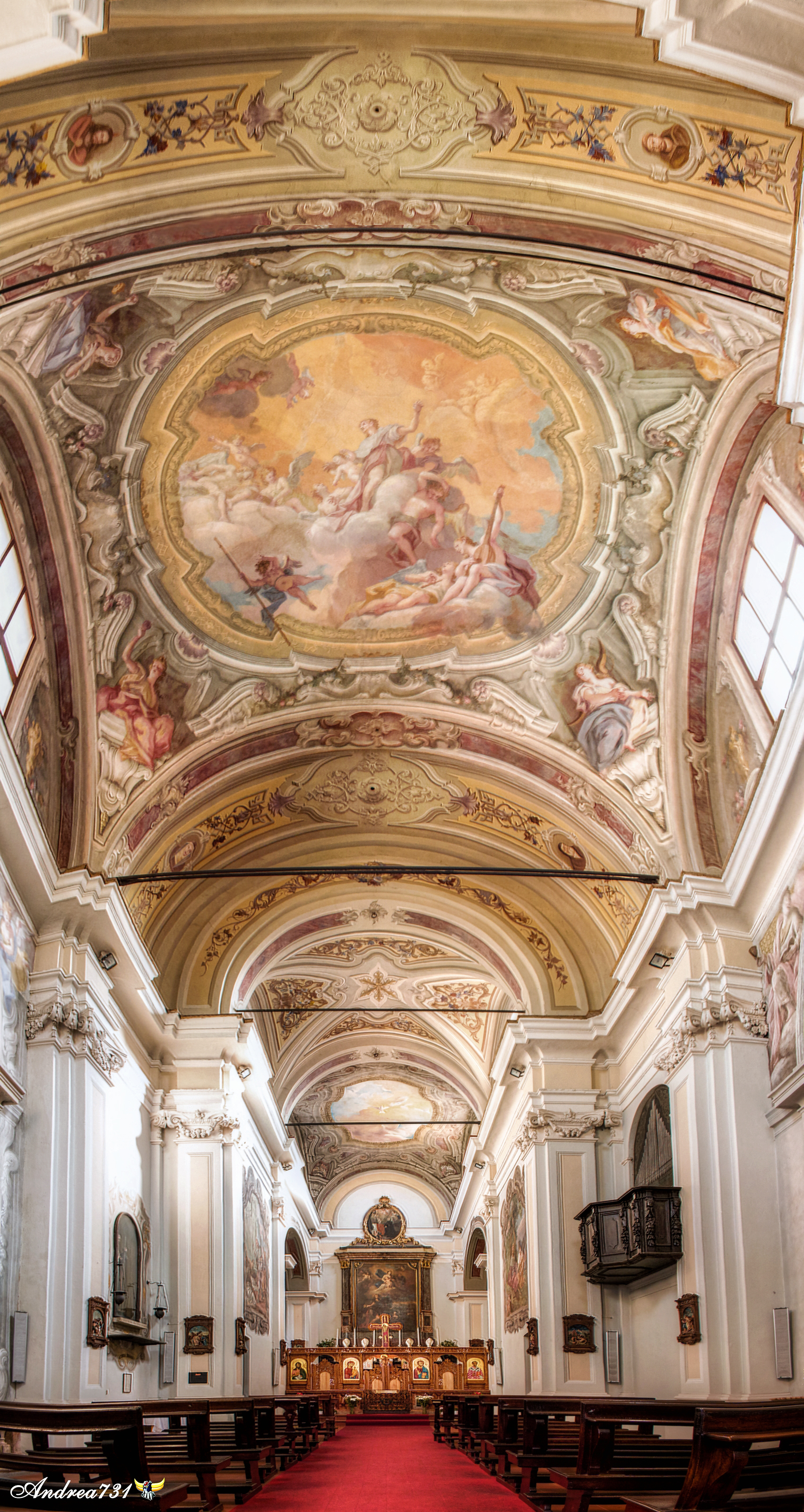

The current church was built over a previous chapel, constructed in 1488 after an epidemic of plague in the town in 1485, and was dedicated to San Rocco. It was a rather small chapel and had no bell tower.

The chapel was demolished and rebuilt between 1706 and 1713, thanks to a donation by lawyer Carlo Visconti. Construction finished in 1713, but the façade and bell tower were finished in 1730, concluding the church’s construction.

Between 1731 and 1732, the church was decorated by Salvatore Bianchi and his son Francesco Maria Bianchi, and the altar was designed by Pietro Antonio Magatti, which is now located in San Michele. In 1895, two statues of San Rocco and San Giuseppe were placed on the façade. The church was extended thanks to a donation by the Bottigelli–Pajàscia family. The church was restored between 1979 and 1982.

== Sagra of San Rocco ==
The Sagra of San Rocco is held every year in September. During the medieval era, farmers would bring their livestock to be blessed by the priest, a tradition which continues to this day, but with household pets instead of livestock.
