= Karl Friedrich =

Karl Friedrich may refer to:

- Karl Friedrich, Grand Duke of Baden (1728–1811)
- Karl Friedrich, Duke of Holstein-Gottorp (1700–1739)
- Karl Friedrich, Duke of Saxe-Meiningen (1712–1743)
- Karl Friedrich, Prince of Hohenzollern (born 1952)
- Karl Friedrich (tenor) (1905–1981)
- Karl Friedrich, Prince of Hohenzollern-Sigmaringen (1724–1785)

== See also ==
- Karl Friedrich Eichhorn (1781–1854), German jurist
- Carl Friedrich (disambiguation)
