= Friedrich Carl =

Friedrich Carl or Karl may refer to:

- Prince Friedrich Karl of Prussia (1828–1885)
- Prince Friedrich Karl of Prussia (1893–1917), German prince and horse rider
- Friedrich Carl (officer) (1916–2013), German Wehrmacht and Bundeswehr officer
- SMS Friedrich Carl (1867), an ironclad warship launched in 1867
- SMS Friedrich Carl (1902), an armored cruiser launched in 1902
- SS Friedrich Karl
- Prince Frederick Charles of Hesse, or Friedrich Karl

== See also ==
- Carl Friedrich (disambiguation)
- Fred Carl (disambiguation)
