= Tired of Winning (book) =

2023 nonfiction book by Jonathan Karl

Tired of Winning: Donald Trump and the End of the Grand Old Party
- Book cover
- Author: Jonathan Karl
- Audio read by: Jonathan Karl
- Subject: Presidency of Donald Trump, Donald Trump 2024 presidential campaign
- Genre: Nonfiction
- Publisher: E. P. Dutton
- Publication date: November 14, 2023
- Pages: 335
- Preceded by: Betrayal: The Final Act of the Trump Show
- Followed by: Retribution: Donald Trump and the Campaign That Changed America

Tired of Winning: Donald Trump and the End of the Grand Old Party is a 2023 nonfiction book by Jonathan Karl about the aftermath of the presidency of Donald Trump, including his presidential campaign. Following Karl's Front Row at the Trump Show and Betrayal: The Final Act of the Trump Show, the book uses entirely new reporting to chronicle Trump's role in the January 6 United States Capitol attack and 2022 midterm elections. It also covers the former president's volatile political relationship with Kim Kardashian and explores the power of Johnny McEntee.
