= Tamar (painting) =

Painting by Francesco Hayez

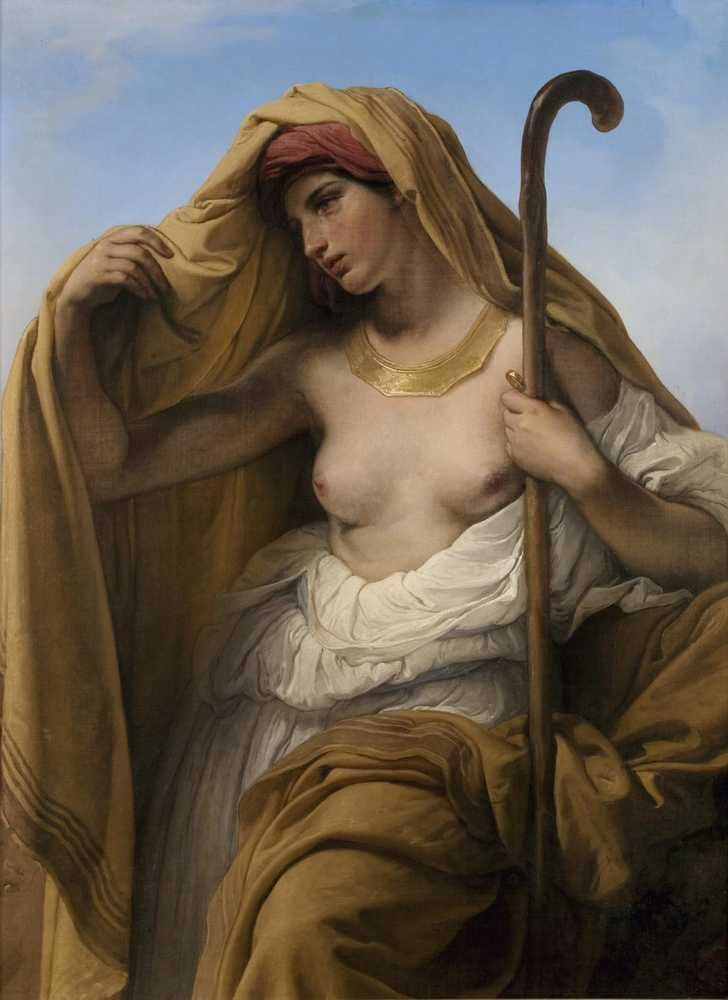
- Artist: Francesco Hayez
- Year: 1847
- Type: Oil on canvas, history painting
- Dimensions: 112 cm × 84.5 cm (44 in × 33.3 in)
- Location: Masnago Castle, Varese

Tamar (Italian: Tamar di Giuda) is an 1847 religious painting by the Italian artist Francesco Hayez. It depicts the biblical figure of Tamar from the Book of Genesis, known for her marriage to Judah's sons Er and Onan. She appears frequently in artworks from the Renaissance era onwards. She was one of a number of biblical woman that the Romantic artist Hayez painted in nude scenes. Today the painting is in the collection of Masnago Castle in Varese.

== Bibliography ==
- Bietoletti, Silvestra & Dantini, Michele. L'Ottocento italiano: La storia, gli artisti, le opere. Giunti, 2002.
- Mazzocca, Fernando . Francesco Hayez: catalogo ragionato. F. Motta, 1994.
