= Betrayal: The Final Act of the Trump Show =

2021 non-fiction book by Jonathan Karl

- Book cover
- Author: Jonathan Karl
- Audio read by: Jonathan Karl
- Subject: Presidency of Donald Trump
- Genre: Non-fiction
- Publisher: E. P. Dutton
- Publication date: November 16, 2021
- Pages: 384
- Preceded by: Front Row at the Trump Show
- Followed by: Tired of Winning: Donald Trump and the End of the Grand Old Party

Betrayal: The Final Act of the Trump Show is a 2021 non-fiction book by Jonathan Karl about Donald Trump. A sequel to Front Row at the Trump Show, it largely covers the final year of the first presidency of Donald Trump, including the COVID-19 pandemic and the January 6 United States Capitol attack.

The book received strong praise from critics, including in The Guardian, The New York Times and The Washington Post. It debuted on The New York Times Best Seller list, and received national attention when Karl released audio of Trump describing chants of "hang Mike Pence" by January 6 insurrectionists as "common sense" and "understandable".
