= Martin Wiehle =

German historian (1926–2023)

Martin Wiehle (23 October 1926 – 10 May 2023) was a German historian.

== Life and career ==
During the Second World War, Wiehle was a German soldier in the Flak and the Kriegsmarine from 1943 to 1945. In the post-war period, he worked as a farm labourer in the Landkreis Bremervörde until 1946, before he was then employed as a miner in Rositz in Thuringia until 1948. This was then followed by specialist training at the librarian school in Jena from 1948 to 1951. He worked from 1951 to 1954 as a librarian at the Landesstelle für Bibliothekswesen, first in Jena, later in Weimar. In 1954, he became director of the public library and "district library Wilhelm Weitling" in Magdeburg. He held this position for more than three decades until 1991. From 1957 to 1963, Wiehle completed a distance learning course in history at Berlin's Humboldt University, from which he came out as a graduate historian.

From 1955, he published works on historical and biographical topics. His main focus was on regional and library history as well as library-related publications. Among his merits are several works on the history of the Magdeburg region, including the Magdeburger Börde and the Altmark. He also contributed to the Magdeburger Biographisches Lexikon published in 2002.

Wiehle died on 10 May 2023, at the age of 96.

== Work ==
- 450 Jahre Magdeburger Stadtbibliothek, 1975, publisher
- Beiträge zur Weitlingforschung, vol. 1, 1986
- Schätze der Stadtbibliothek Magdeburg, 1992
- Magdeburger Persönlichkeiten, 1993, ISBN 3-910146-06-6
- Altmark-Persönlichkeiten, 1999, ISBN 3-932090-61-6
- Bördepersönlichkeiten, 2001, ISBN 3-935358-20-2
