= Tamara =

Tamara may refer to:

== People and fictional characters ==
- Tamara (given name), including a list of people and fictional characters with the name
- Tamar of Georgia (1160s–1213), or Tamara, Queen of Georgia 1184–1213
- Tamara (Spanish singer), Spanish singer Tamara Macarena Valcárcel Serrano
- Tamara, a stage name, along with Yurena, for Spanish pop singer María del Mar Cuena Seisdedos (born 1969)
- Tamara Drasin (c. 1905–1943), Ukrainian-born singer and actress, also known mononymously as Tamara
- Tamara Todevska (born 1985), Macedonian pop singer, also known mononymously as Tamara

== Arts and entertainment ==
- Tamara (1938 film), a French drama film
- Tamara (2005 film), an American horror film
- Tamara (2016 French film), a French-Belgian teen comedy film
- Tamara (2016 Venezuelan film), a Venezuelan drama film
- Tamara (play), by John Krizanc, 1981
- Tamara (symphonic poem), by Mily Balakirev, 1882, and a 1912 ballet by Michel Fokine and Léon Bakst

== Other uses ==
- 326 Tamara, a main belt asteroid
- Tamara passive sensor, a Czech electronic support measure system
- Tamara (yacht), the yacht of Grand Duke Alexander Mikhailovich of Russia built in 1898
- Támara, Casanare, a municipality in the Colombian department of Casanare
- Tamara Coast to Coast Way, long-distance footpath in England

== See also ==
- Tamar (disambiguation)
- Ta Mara and the Seen, a 1980s American musical group based in Minneapolis
- Tamera, a peace research village in Portugal
- Tamera (name), a variation of the female given name Tamara
