= Retribution: Donald Trump and the Campaign That Changed America =

2025 non-fiction book by Jonathan Karl

- Book cover
- Author: Jonathan Karl
- Audio read by: Jonathan Karl
- Subject: 2024 United States presidential election, second presidency of Donald Trump
- Genre: Non-fiction
- Publisher: Penguin Group
- Publication date: October 28, 2025
- Pages: 448
- ISBN: 979-8-217-04700-0
- Preceded by: Tired of Winning

Retribution: Donald Trump and the Campaign That Changed America is a 2025 non-fiction book by Jonathan Karl about the 2024 United States presidential election and the start of the second presidency of Donald Trump. It is based on extensive interviews with figures on the Trump campaign, Joe Biden campaign, and Kamala Harris campaign, including Donald Trump and Hunter Biden.
