= Jonathan Karl =

American journalist (born 1968)

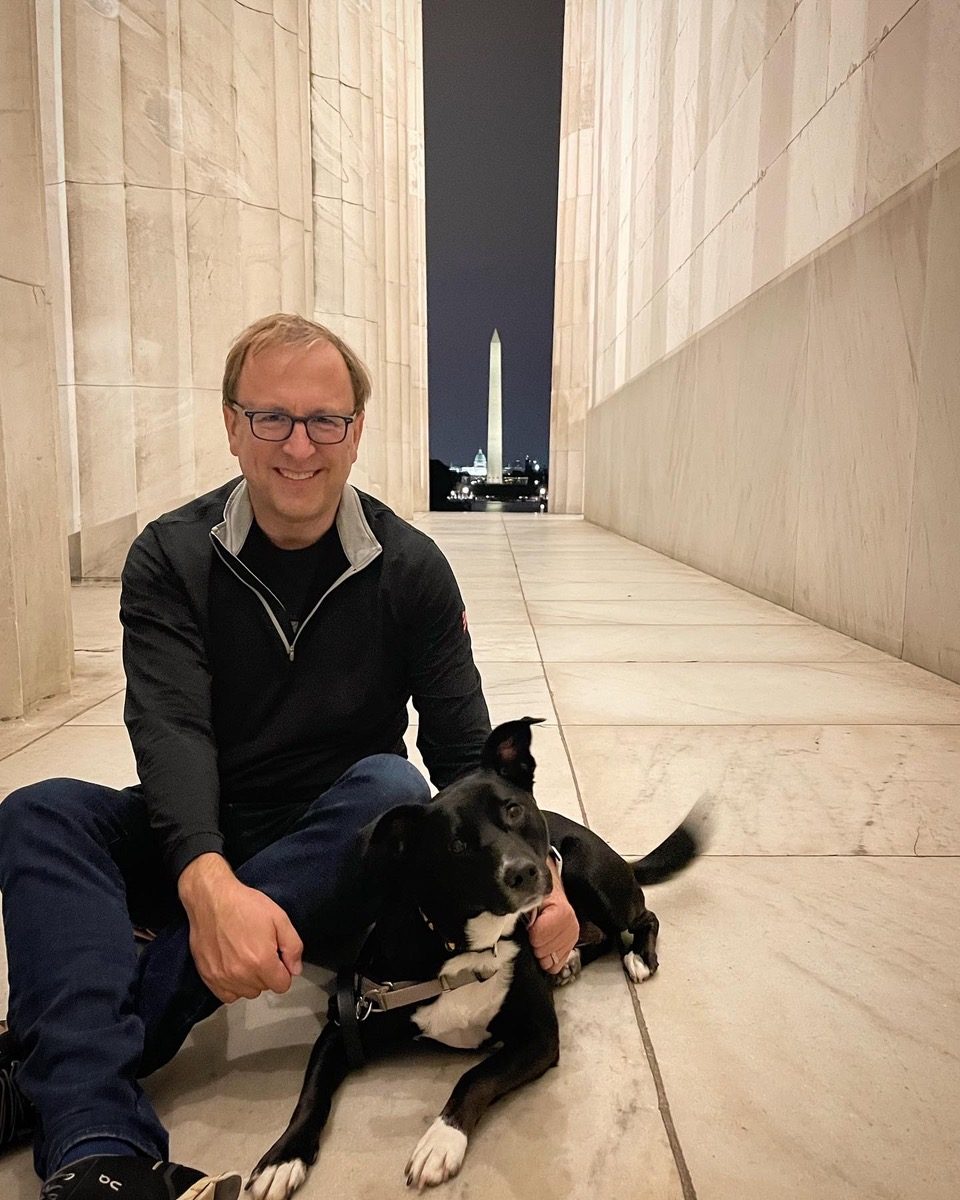
- Karl in 2022
- Born: Jonathan David Karl; January 19, 1968 (age 58)
- Education: Vassar College (BA)
- Occupation: Journalist
- Employers: The New Republic (c. 1990–1994); New York Post (1994–1996); CNN (1996–2003); ABC News (2003–present)
- Height: 6 ft (183 cm)
- Title: Chief White House correspondent, ABC News
- Term: 2012– Present
- Political party: Independent (I)
- Children: 2
- Relatives: Allan Karl (brother)

94th President of the White House Correspondents' Association
- In office 2019–2020
- Preceded by: Olivier Knox
- Succeeded by: Zeke Miller

Jonathan David Karl (born January 19, 1968) (Note: In a 2008 interview with C-SPAN, Karl stated that his 40th birthday was January 19, the same date as the 2008 South Carolina Republican presidential primary.) is an American political journalist and author. Karl has covered the White House, Capitol Hill, the Pentagon, and the U.S. State Department, and has reported from more than 30 countries, covering U.S. politics, foreign policy, and the military.

Karl has been the chief Washington correspondent for ABC News and co-anchor of This Week with George Stephanopoulos. Karl served as the chief White House correspondent for ABC News from December 2012 through the end of the first Trump administration in January 2021.

He is the author of the 2020 book Front Row at the Trump Show and the 2021 book Betrayal: The Final Act of the Trump Show. Both books are New York Times bestsellers. His latest books, Tired of Winning: Donald Trump and the End of the Grand Old Party (2023) and Retribution: Donald Trump and the Campaign That Changed America (2025), cover Donald Trump's return to the presidency.

== Early life ==
Karl spent time growing up in both Connecticut and South Dakota, one of four sons of Wayne Frederick Karl and Audrey Karl (later Shaff). His father ran Karl's Autobody in Stamford, Connecticut, founded by his own father, James, in 1925. He has brothers Allan, James, and Robert. He graduated from Darien High School in Darien, Connecticut. While living in a Hill City, South Dakota, motel, his mother and stepfather did an oral history project for the University of South Dakota, interviewing the men who worked to create Mount Rushmore. Karl later credited that project for sparking his interest in journalism.

Karl graduated Phi Beta Kappa from Vassar College in 1990, where he was the editor-in-chief of the Vassar Spectator. He married Maria Nova Catalano in 1991 in Ridgewood, New Jersey.

== Career ==
Karl began his career as a researcher and reporter for The New Republic. In 1994, he became a reporter at the New York Post, where he covered New York City Hall. He first interviewed Donald Trump in 1994 for a New York Post article about Michael Jackson and Lisa Marie Presley's honeymoon at Trump Tower. In 1996, he was hired to cover politics as a Generation X reporter at CNN and went on to become the network's congressional correspondent.

He joined ABC News in January 2003 as the senior foreign affairs correspondent covering the State Department. Karl worked for ABC News covering national political news, becoming the senior national security correspondent in December 2005. In 2006, he earned an Emmy Award nomination for his coverage of the genocide in Darfur, Sudan.

Karl was named chief White House correspondent for ABC News in December 2012 and held that position through the end of the Trump administration in January 2021. He is currently ABC News' chief Washington correspondent and co-anchor of This Week with George Stephanopoulos. Karl's writings have been published in The Wall Street Journal, The Atlantic, Vanity Fair, among other publications.

Although Karl is an ABC News correspondent, he has often appeared on MSNBC, CNN, and Fox News in his capacity as an author.

=== Controversies ===
In May 2013, Karl wrote an article about the reaction of Barack Obama's administration to the 2012 Benghazi attack in which he claimed to quote directly from an email sent by a White House advisor. It was later revealed that the quote was inaccurately given to Karl by an unnamed source, and that he himself had never seen the email. Karl apologized for the error and for not having stated that the quote was from a summary his source had provided, rather than a direct quote from the email.

== Books ==
=== The Right to Bear Arms: The Rise of America's New Militias ===
Karl is the author of the 1995 book The Right to Bear Arms: The Rise of America's New Militias.

=== Front Row at the Trump Show ===
In March 2020, his book Front Row at the Trump Show, written before the COVID-19 pandemic, was released. It debuted at number 3 on the April 19, 2020, New York Times Combined Print & E-Book Nonfiction best seller list and spent 5 weeks in the top 15.

The book was released in paperback with a new afterword in March 2021 and hit number 6 on the New York Times Paperback Nonfiction best seller list.

The New York Times review called it an account chronicling the first three years of Trump's presidency. "The book feels weightiest toward its end, when Karl addresses 'the president’s incessant telling of untruths' and Trump's dangerous relationship with the press. Unspooling a distressing private Oval Office meeting with the president on the matter, he concludes, 'I fear President Trump's war on truth may do lasting damage to American democracy.'"

The Washington Post review calls the book "chiefly a compilation of his encounters and interviews with Trump and members of his staff" with "far too much recounting, often in somewhat tedious detail, of Karl’s daily coverage of Trump." According to the reviewer, the account "lacks analysis of the larger issues Trump and his presidency represent," while acknowledging in the epilogue "that Trump is 'motivated only by an insatiable desire to promote himself, but his assault on truth is toxic and contagious.'"

A review in The Guardian states that the "well-organized and respectfully written" book "conveys the chaos and the characters that inhabit the president’s universe," including "his preternatural disregard for the truth—'Trump was a serial exaggerator long before he ran for president'—and his curious soft spot for the Confederacy."

=== Betrayal: The Final Act of the Trump Show ===
Karl's next book, Betrayal: The Final Act of the Trump Show, mostly covers the last year of the Trump administration and was released in November 2021. It debuted at number 3 on the December 5, 2021, New York Times Combined Print & E-Book Nonfiction best seller list and spent 3 weeks in the top 15.

The Washington Post book review said, "Karl's sobering, solid, account of Trump's last year in office sheds new light on how the man who lost the presidency nearly succeeded in overthrowing the 2020 election. Anyone who thinks that 'it can’t happen here,' ought to read this book."

In The Guardian, John S. Gardner wrote, "Jonathan Karl produced arguably the year’s most significant book in Betrayal, in which Trump cabinet members ‘paint a portrait of a wrath-filled president, untethered from reality, bent on revenge’."

Larry Sabato of the University of Virginia named Betrayal the number one political book of 2021, saying, "Betrayal broke a lot of news but the reason I chose it is because it makes all the points that people need to know about what Karl calls ‘the final act of The Trump Show’ and it is very well written."

An NPR review says, "The overarching theme of Betrayal is that the former president did not merely flirt with defying the 2020 election result, he focused on it obsessively and conducted a months-long campaign to make it possible. This effort began well before Election Day and continued well after the constitutional process had been completed and Trump's opponent had been elected and inaugurated as president." The review adds: "As a longtime TV reporter, ABC News Chief Washington Correspondent Jonathan Karl brings an eye for life as presented on screen that is acutely appropriate for the Trump saga."

The New York Times review said the book "is less insightful about the Trump White House and more revealing of Karl's own gradual, extremely belated awareness that something in the White House might in fact be awry." Karl had complained in his 2020 book that "the mainstream media coverage of Donald Trump is relentlessly and exhaustively negative." He acknowledged in his new book that Trump's "lies turned deadly and shook the foundations of our democracy." The book gives an inside look at the Trump White House, including scoops on memos by aide John McEntee, "who went from carrying President Trump's bags to becoming the director of the Presidential Personnel Office—'responsible for the hiring and firing of more than 4,000 political appointees across the federal government.'" In the messages, McEntee insisted that Vice President Mike Pence "had the authority to overturn the results of the November election" and that Defense Secretary Mark Esper should be fired.

Karl released audio from his March 2021 Trump interview for the book in which Trump defended the "hang Mike Pence" chants of rioters during the 2021 United States Capitol attack on January 6 as "understandable" since Pence had not overturned the 2020 election results as requested.

=== Retribution: Donald Trump and the Campaign That Changed America ===
Karl, Jonathan (October 28, 2025). Retribution: Donald Trump and the Campaign That Changed America. Penguin Group. ISBN 979-8-217-04700-0.

== Awards ==
Karl twice received the Award for Excellence in Washington, D.C.–based reporting—in 2010 and 2015, the 2013 Walter Cronkite Award for National Individual Achievement, an Emmy Award in 2009 for his coverage of the presidential Inauguration of Barack Obama, and the National Press Foundation's Everett McKinley Dirksen Award in 2001.

In 2021, Karl received the Merriman Smith Memorial Award for Excellence in Presidential News Coverage for his reporting on Donald Trump's infection with COVID-19. That same year, Mediaite named him one of the top 10 "Most Influential in News Media." The publication wrote, "Jonathan Karl covered many major stories this year as ABC News chief Washington correspondent, but it’s the reporting he dished out in his bestseller—Betrayal: The Final Act of the Trump Show—and how that book propelled the news cycle for weeks that secured his spot so high up on this list."

== Notes ==
Media offices
Preceded by Jake Tapper	Chief White House Correspondent of ABC News; 2012–2021	Succeeded by Cecilia Vega
