= Franz Karl =

Franz Karl may refer to:

- Franz Karl (general) (1888–1964), Generalleutnant in the Wehrmacht during World War II
- Archduke Franz Karl of Austria (1802–1878), father of the emperors Franz Joseph I of Austria and Maximilian I of Mexico
- Franz Karl of Auersperg (1660–1713), Prince of Auersperg
