= Masnago =

- neighbourhood of Varese
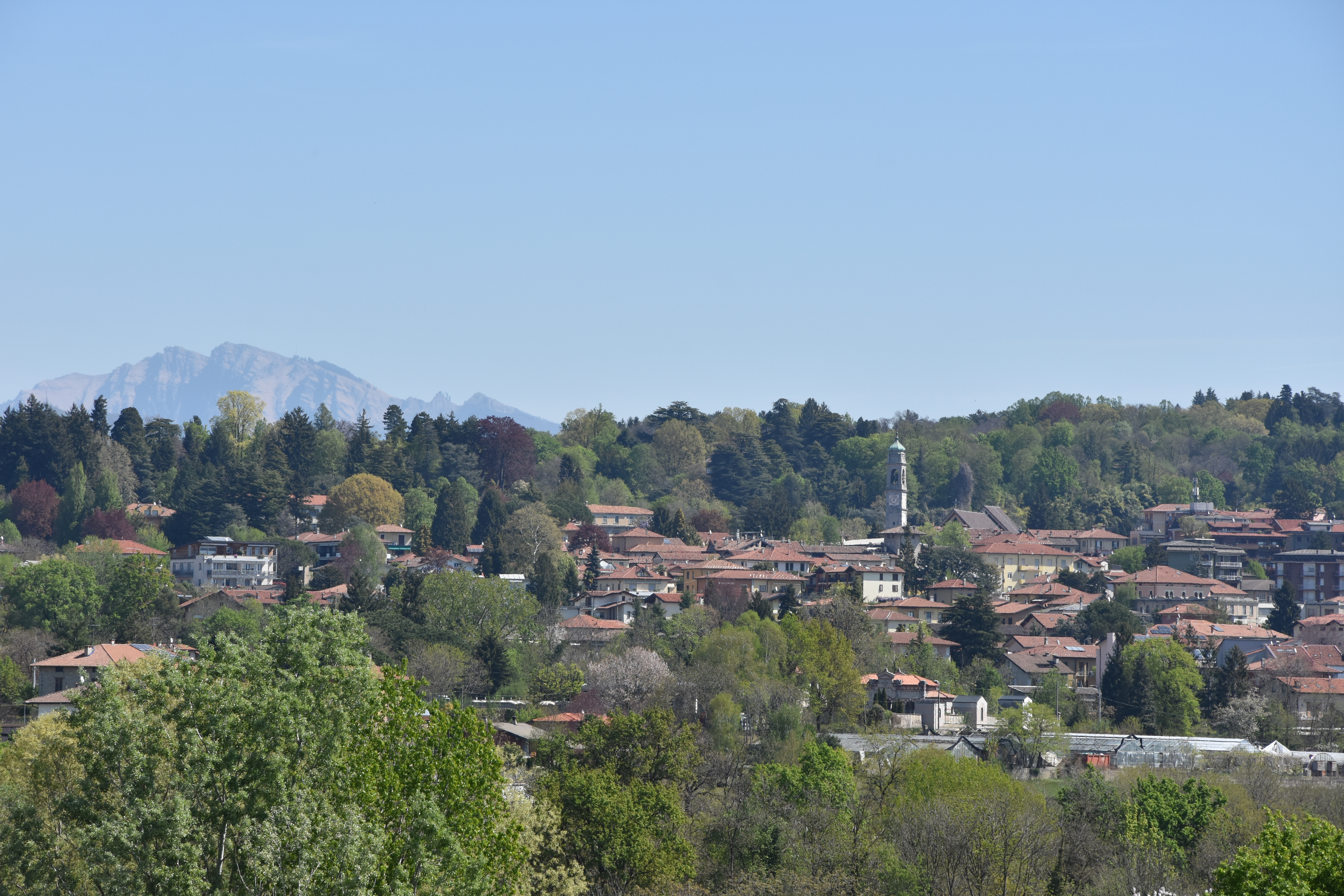
- Interactive map of Masnago
- Coordinates: 45°49′47.5″N 8°47′40.8″E
- Country: Italy
- Region: Lombardy
- Province: Varese
- Comune: Varese

Population
  - Total: 8,000
- Time zone: UTC+1 (CET)
  - Summer (DST): UTC+2 (CEST)
- Postal code: 21100

Masnago is a neighbourhood or quartiere of the city of Varese, Italy, located in the northern part of the city. It had been an independent municipality until 1927 when it merged with Varese. The Castello of Masnago is found in this district.
