= William Karl =

American engineer and professor

William Clem Karl is an ECE Department Chair and Professor at Boston University who was named Fellow of the Institute of Electrical and Electronics Engineers (IEEE) in 2014 for contributions to statistical signal processing and image reconstruction and in 2018 was inducted into the Medical and Biological Engineering Elite of the American Institute for Medical and Biological Engineering. Karl is a graduate of Massachusetts Institute of Technology from which he got his Ph.D. in 1991.
