= Carl Friedrich Meerwein =

German civil engineer and aviation pioneer

Carl Friedrich Meerwein (2 August 1737 – 6 December 1810) was a German civil engineer and aviation pioneer.

Meerwein was born in Leiselheim. He built flying devices with moving wings. According to the Encyclopædia Britannica he succeeded in flying with one of these devices, an ornithopter in 1781, at Giessen, Holy Roman Empire. Further attempts were less successful. There is a legend that he only survived one of his flights in 1784 because he hit exactly upon a dung pile.

"Meerwein, the architect of the Prince of Baden, built an orthopteric machine, and protested against the tendency of the aerostats which had just been invented." (Verne, Robur)

Meerwein died in Emmendingen, as a result of a fall from a horse.

== Sources ==
This article is based in part on material from the German Wikipedia.
