= Theodor Innitzer =

Austrian cardinal and politician

His Eminence Theodor Innitzer
- Cardinal, Archbishop of Vienna
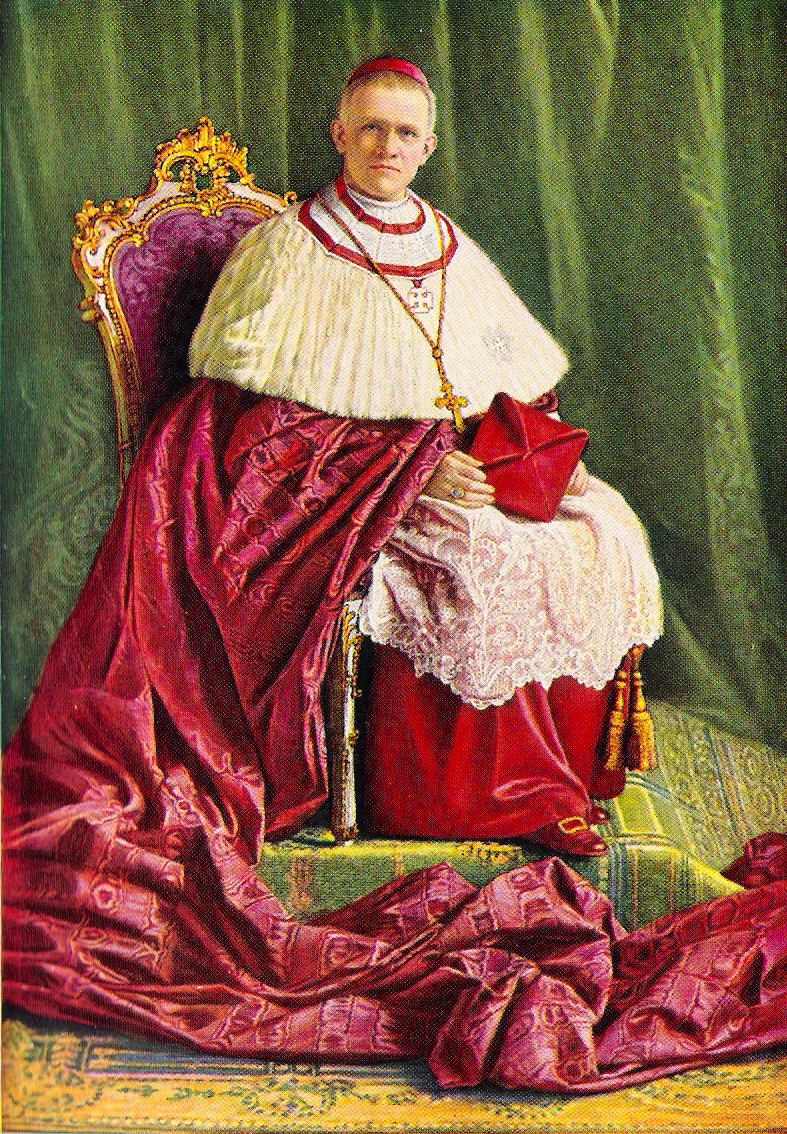
- Archdiocese: Vienna
- See: Vienna
- Appointed: 19 September 1932
- Installed: 16 October 1932
- Term ended: 9 October 1955
- Predecessor: Friedrich Gustav Piffl
- Successor: Franz König
- Other post: Cardinal-Priest of San Crisogono

Orders
- Ordination: 25 July 1902
- Consecration: 16 October 1932 by Enrico Sibilia
- Created cardinal: 13 March 1933 by Pius XI
- Rank: Cardinal-Priest

Personal details
- Born: 25 December 1875 Neugeschrei-Weipert, Kingdom of Bohemia, Austria-Hungary
- Died: 9 December 1955 (aged 79) Vienna
- Buried: St. Stephen's Cathedral, Vienna
- Denomination: Roman Catholic
- Coat of arms

Theodor Innitzer (25 December 1875 – 9 October 1955) was Archbishop of Vienna and a cardinal of the Catholic Church.

Despite his initial support for the Nazi party, his home later became a refuge for Jews, while he strove to alleviate public misery and restore the Austrian Church, disassociating himself from politics.

== Early life ==
Innitzer was born in Neugeschrei (Nové Zvolání), part of the town Weipert (Vejprty) in Bohemia, at that time Austria-Hungary, (now Czech Republic). He was the son of a passementier Wilhelm Innitzer in Vejprty, later a textile factory worker, and his wife Maria born Seidl, daughter of a mining clerk. After completing the minimum mandatory school, Innitzer became an apprentice in a textile factory. The dean of his home parish supported young Theodor, thus paving the way for him to attend higher schools (Gymnasium) in Kaaden.

== Ecclesiastical career ==
Styles of Theodor Innitzer
- Reference style: His Eminence
- Spoken style: Your Eminence
- Informal style: Cardinal
- See: Vienna

- 1898 – entered the seminary in Vienna
- 1902 – priestly ordination
- 1906 – doctorate in theology
- 1908 to 1911 Privatdozent at the University of Vienna
- 1911 to 1932 professor and (from 1913) chair for New Testament Exegesis
- 1928 to 1929 rector of the University of Vienna
- 1929 to 1930 Minister of Social Affairs in the third government of Chancellor Johann Schober
- 1932 consecrated archbishop of Vienna
- 1933 named a cardinal

== Political activity and assessment ==
=== The Anschluss ===
Innitzer's role in early 20th century Austrian history remains disputed because of his involvement in politics. Despite early support for the Anschluss, Innitzer became a critic of National Socialism and was subject to further violent intimidation.

This assessment stems from his cooperation with the Austro-fascist government of Engelbert Dollfuß and Kurt Schuschnigg from 1934 to 1938, which based many of its economic and social policies on the teachings of the Catholic Church. He and the other Austrian Catholic bishops signed a declaration endorsing the Anschluss, set up by Gauleiter Josef Bürckel, and signed by Innitzer with "Heil Hitler!". Without the bishops' consent, the Nazi regime disseminated this statement throughout the German Reich.

Vatican Radio had recently broadcast a vehement denunciation of the Nazi action, and Cardinal Pacelli (soon to become Pope Pius XII) ordered Innitzer to report to the Vatican. Before meeting with Pius XI, Innitzer met with Pacelli, who had been outraged by Innitzer's statement. He made it clear that Innitzer needed to retract and was made to sign a new statement, issued on behalf of all the Austrian bishops, which asserted that "the solemn declaration of the Austrian bishops ... was clearly not intended to be an approval of something that was not and is not compatible with God's law." The Vatican newspaper also reported that the bishops' earlier statement had been issued without the approval of the Holy See.

=== Nazi intimidation ===
In April 1938, in honour of Hitler's birthday, Cardinal Innitzer had ordered that all Austrian churches fly the swastika flag, ring bells, and pray for Hitler. Innitzer also called a day of prayer in the Cathedral of St. Stephen of Vienna for 7 October 1938, which was attended by almost 9,000 people, mostly young people. In the sermon, Innitzer declared that "we must confess our faith in our Führer, for there is just one Führer: Jesus Christ." Nazi leaders were angered: about 100 Nazis, among them many older members of the Hitler Youth, ransacked the archbishop's residence the next day. In Britain, the Catholic Herald provided the following contemporary account on 14 October 1938:

The invasion was a reply to a courageous sermon the Cardinal had preached in the Cathedral earlier in the evening, in which the Cardinal told his packed congregation that "in the last few months, you have lost everything!' This sermon marked the end of Cardinal Innitzer's attempt to establish a religious peace with the Nazis. The attempt has failed. Cardinal Innitzer is now in line with his German brothers, openly urging Catholics to resist anti-Catholic measures. [...] Nazi mobs have penetrated into the Archbishop's Palace on St. Stephen's Square in Vienna and have demolished part of the furniture. Other furniture, as well as files and documents were thrown through the windows and set on fire. Hostile cries like "down with the clergy," "send the Cardinal into a concentration camp," "traitor bishop" and so on were heard.

=== World War II ===
Innitzer's ambiguous relationship with the Nazi regime brought him a lot of criticism after World War II (he was referred to as the "Heil Hitler Cardinal"). During the war, Innitzer was critical of the anti-Semitic and racist policies of the Nazis towards the Austrian Jews and the Catholic gypsies of the Austrian countryside.

He openly, though moderately, supported the war effort against the Soviet Union, however. Years before, he had campaigned against Soviet policies. In 1933, based on data collected by undercover investigation and photographs, Innitzer sought to raise awareness in the West of the Holodomor and even cases of cannibalism that were occurring in Ukraine and the North Caucasus at that time.

In October 1944, Innitzer preached in the parish of Vienna-Reindorf, which also included members of the NSDAP local group who listened and wrote a report about it. They reported that Innitzer attributed the war to God directly; he saw it as a punishment for lukewarm participation in church life: children not receiving Communion, absolution in confession, or religious instruction at school. Seminaries were closing, and only one sixth of Catholics attended Holy Mass. The report understood this as indirect criticism of the National Socialist government, since their measures had suppressed the church's influence.

== Writings ==
- John the Baptist. Illustrated according to the scriptures and tradition by Theodor Innitzer. Mayer, Vienna 1908.
- Commentary on the Gospel of Healing Luke, excluding the story of suffering. (Revised by Franz Xaver Pölzl. 2nd edition, especially by Theodor Innitzer.) Graz u. Vienna 1912.
- Court Councilor Dr. Ms. X. Pölzl. Styria, Graz 1915.
- Commentary on the Gospel of St. Mark, excluding the history of suffering. (Founded by Franz Xaver Pölzl. 3rd revised edition, especially by Theodor Innitzer.) Graz u. Vienna 1916.
- Brief commentary on the Four Holy Gospels. (Founded by Franz Xaver Poelzl continued by Theodor Innitzer. 4 verb. Edition) Graz 1928.
- The Religion of the Earth in detail. (Together with Fritz Wilke.) Leipzig u. Vienna 1929.
- The Holy Year and Peace. In: Hermann Hoffmann: The Church and Peace. 1,933th
- He is risen! Pictures by Josef von Führich. Statement by Theodor Innitzer. Bernina, Vienna 1949.
- Letter of Faith. Herder, Vienna 1939–40
- "What are we doing ourselves?" Cardinal Archbishop Theodor Innitzer u. Archbishop coadjutor Franz Jachym call for help for young families. Catholic family work of the Archdiocese of Vienna, Vienna 1951.

== Kardinal Innitzer Prize ==
The Archdiocese of Vienna annually awards the Kardinal-Innitzer-Preis to scientists and scholars.

== Cultural references ==
In the 1963 movie The Cardinal, Innitzer was played by Josef Meinrad. The film portrays the Anschluss, the bishops' statement, and Nazis looting Innitzer's residence.

== See also ==
- List of Austrians
- List of Austrian Politicians

Political offices
| Preceded by Josef Resch | Austrian Minister of Social Affairs; 1929–1930 | Succeeded by Richard Schmitz (acting) |
Catholic Church titles
| Preceded by Friedrich Gustav Piffl | Archbishop of Vienna; 1932–1955 | Succeeded by Franz König |
