= Allan Karl =

American author, adventurer and speaker

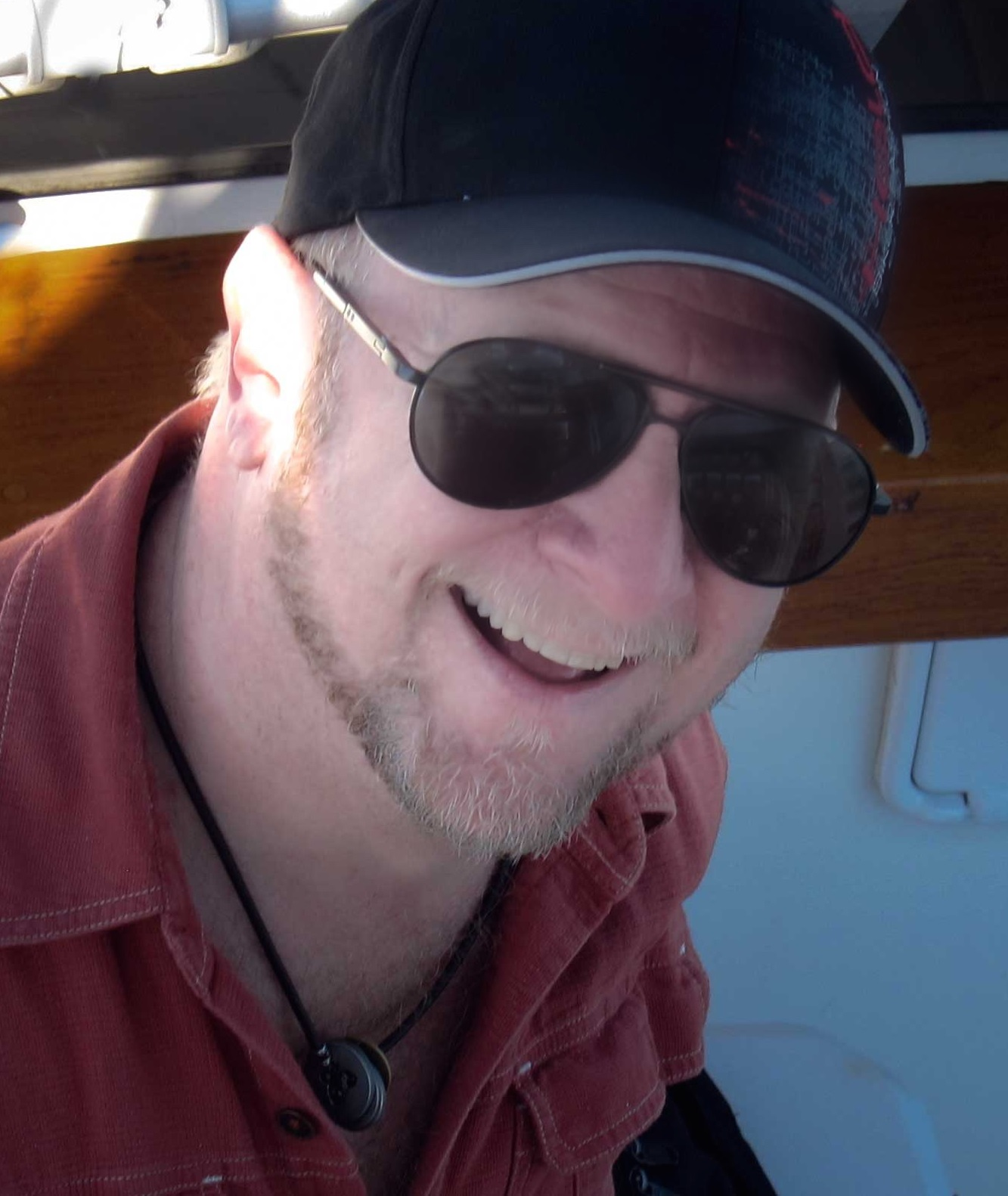
- Born: Allan Frederick Karl; Darien, Connecticut
- Known for: Travelling around the world on his motorbike
- Notable work: Forks: A Quest for Culture, Cuisine and Connection
- Relatives: Jonathan Karl (brother)
- Website: allankarl.com

Allan Frederick Karl is an American author, adventurer and speaker. He is most known for travelling around the world on his motorcycle and subsequently writing the book, Forks: A Quest for Culture, Cuisine and Connection.

After a divorce and finding himself unemployed, in 2005, Karl decided to go on a trip around the world. He spent the next three years travelling on five continents and visited 35 countries. He returned to the United States in 2008 and became a public speaker talking about his travel experience.

== Early life and education ==
Karl was born in Darien, Connecticut and graduated from Darien High School in 1978. He is a graduate of S.I. Newhouse School, Syracuse University. He is one of four sons of Wayne Frederick Karl and Audrey Karl (later Shaff). His father ran Karl's Autobody in Stamford, Connecticut, founded by his own father, James, in 1925. He has brothers Jonathan, James, and the late Robert.

== Career ==
Karl was a marketer by profession before he left for his trip. In 2000, he co-founded the company Wirestone, a creative and interactive services company and served there as a vice president. However, he felt that his job was not fulfilling and he started another company, but he still felt unhappy. Following a divorce, Karl left his job and decided to travel.

After returning from his trip Karl became a tech entrepreneur and motivational speaker. In his presentations, he shares his travel experience. Since July 2009, he has visited several BMW dealerships in the U.S. as a speaker. He was a speaker at the general session the Global Business Travel Association's Leadership Summit in 2013. and Roadrunner magazine's annual touring weekend in 2014. At the touring weekend he shared a presentation entitled The Beginning at the End of the Road, which draws from his riding experience.

== Three-year trip ==
In 2003, after Karl's marriage ended in divorce, he left his company. He had always wanted to travel around the world and was passionate about bikes and photography, so he started planning a trip. He spent the next two years planning the routes for his trip. He wanted to visit as many UNESCO sites as many he could. In 2005, he sold everything he owned and started his journey on a BMW F650GS Dakar. Karl started from his home in Newport Beach, California, travelled up to Alaska, across Canada, down to Mexico, and around Central and South America before heading to Africa, Europe, and Asia. Initially, he had just planned to travel to Panama, but he kept extending his trip.

After crossing the Panama Canal, Karl entered Colombia where several families let him stay at their homes. When he reached the southern border, he was stopped by police who advised him of the dangers of the jungle and urged him to go straight through without stopping for anything. However, he continued. Exploring the jungle, at one point, he stopped to take a picture of a waterfall where two men holding machine guns came to him and asked him to come with them. Karl was terrified at first, but he ended up befriending them and they took him deep into the jungle to see a better waterfall.

Six months into his travel, when Karl was going to Salar de Uyuni in Bolivia, he had an accident while riding on a muddy dirt road 15,000 feet high in the Bolivian Andes. It had been raining from several days and his bike slipped out from under him and his panniers fell on top of his left leg and broke it in three places. He sat alone in the sun for several hours. Two Bolivian boys came and sheltered Karl with umbrellas. Twelve hours after the accident, a makeshift ambulance arrived and took Karl to a hospital in Potosí. He had to come back to California for treatment of broken leg. He underwent surgery followed by rehab of six months. However, after recovery, he went to Bolivia to continue his journey. He reached Salar de Uyuni and continued south, eventually reaching Tierra del Fuego. A family took him in for a short time until arrangements were made to fly to Cape Town in South Africa. From there, he began riding his motorcycle again, heading north. Using the Nile River as a guide, Karl reached Cairo, Egypt. After negotiating with border guards for days, Karl was allowed to tour Syria, but could not enter most Middle Eastern countries due to the wars.

After three years, Karl was in Turkey and tried once more to get a visa for entrance into Iran. The Iran government turned him down for the third time. At that time, he decided to go home. He shipped his motorcycle to Baltimore, Maryland and then continued his journey from Washington, D.C. across the United States, riding only on the backroads, not on interstate highways, and returned to Newport Beach, California.

On his trip, Karl learned to speak Spanish, Portuguese, as well as a little Arabic. At the end of his three-year trip, he had covered 62,000 miles in 35 countries on five continents. While he travelled, he also posted an online blog at WorldRider.com.

== Forks ==
In his book, Forks: A Quest for Culture, Cuisine, and Connection, Karl documents his travels through the many stories, images and recipes he collected. In the book, each of his destinations is arranged into a short chapter in the order in which he visited, illustrated with photos and chronicled with a travelogue anchored with a recipe that represents the national dish. Karl has also discussed his packing list, his motorcycle specifications, and the statistics and maintenance of his journey in the book.

He published the book independently and released it in June 2014. The book includes 40 recipes and 700 photos of places he visited. Initially, he did not plan to add recipes in the book, however one day he made moqueca, a Brazilian fish stew, for friends. His friends enjoyed the dish a lot and he decided to add recipes of dishes he liked on his travel to his book.

Forks has been compared to Anthony Bourdain's work. City Book Review wrote that, "this book is a delight for the eyes, the imagination, for the heart, and to bask in what it must have felt like to share these experiences with people all over the world" and Midwest Book Review wrote that Forks is "sure to be the crown jewel of many an armchair traveler's collection."

=== Kickstarter campaign ===
When Karl returned to United States, he pitched the idea of his book to publishers, but they refused to work on his book. The publishers asked him to simplify the premise of the book by removing the recipes and making the book a traditional travelogue. However, he did not want to do that. Karl then started a Kickstarter campaign to self-publish his book. He set a goal of raising $22,000, which he raised in nine days and ended up raising $40,994. With the funds he raised, he printed 2,000 copies of first-run books, hired a publicist, printed more books and planned a national book launch tour.

== See also ==
- List of long-distance motorcycle riders
