= Borgo =

Borgo may refer to the following places:

== Finland ==
- Borgå

== France ==
- Borgo, Haute-Corse

== Italy ==
- Borgo (rione of Rome), a rione in the City of Rome
- Borgo a Mozzano, in the province of Lucca
- Borgo d'Ale, in the province of Vercelli
- Borgo di Terzo, in the province of Bergamo
- Borgo Pace, in the province of Pesaro e Urbino
- Borgo Priolo, in the province of Pavia
- Borgo San Dalmazzo, in the province of Cuneo
- Borgo San Giacomo, in the province of Brescia
- Borgo San Giovanni, in the province of Lodi
- Borgo San Lorenzo, in the province of Florence
- Borgo San Martino, in the province of Alessandria
- Borgo San Siro, in the province of Pavia
- Borgo Santa Lucia an historic rione in the City of Naples
- Borgo Ticino, in the province of Novara
- Borgo Tossignano, in the province of Bologna
- Borgo Val di Taro, in the province of Parma
- Borgo Valsugana, in the province of Trento
- Borgo Velino, in the province of Rieti
- Borgo Vercelli, in the province of Vercelli
- Borgosesia, in the province of Vercelli
- Borgomanero, in the province of Novara
- Borgorose, in the province of Rieti

== Malta ==
- Birgu

== Romania ==
- Borgo Pass

== San Marino ==
- Borgo Maggiore
