= Tamar, Mazandaran =

Tamar تمر
- village
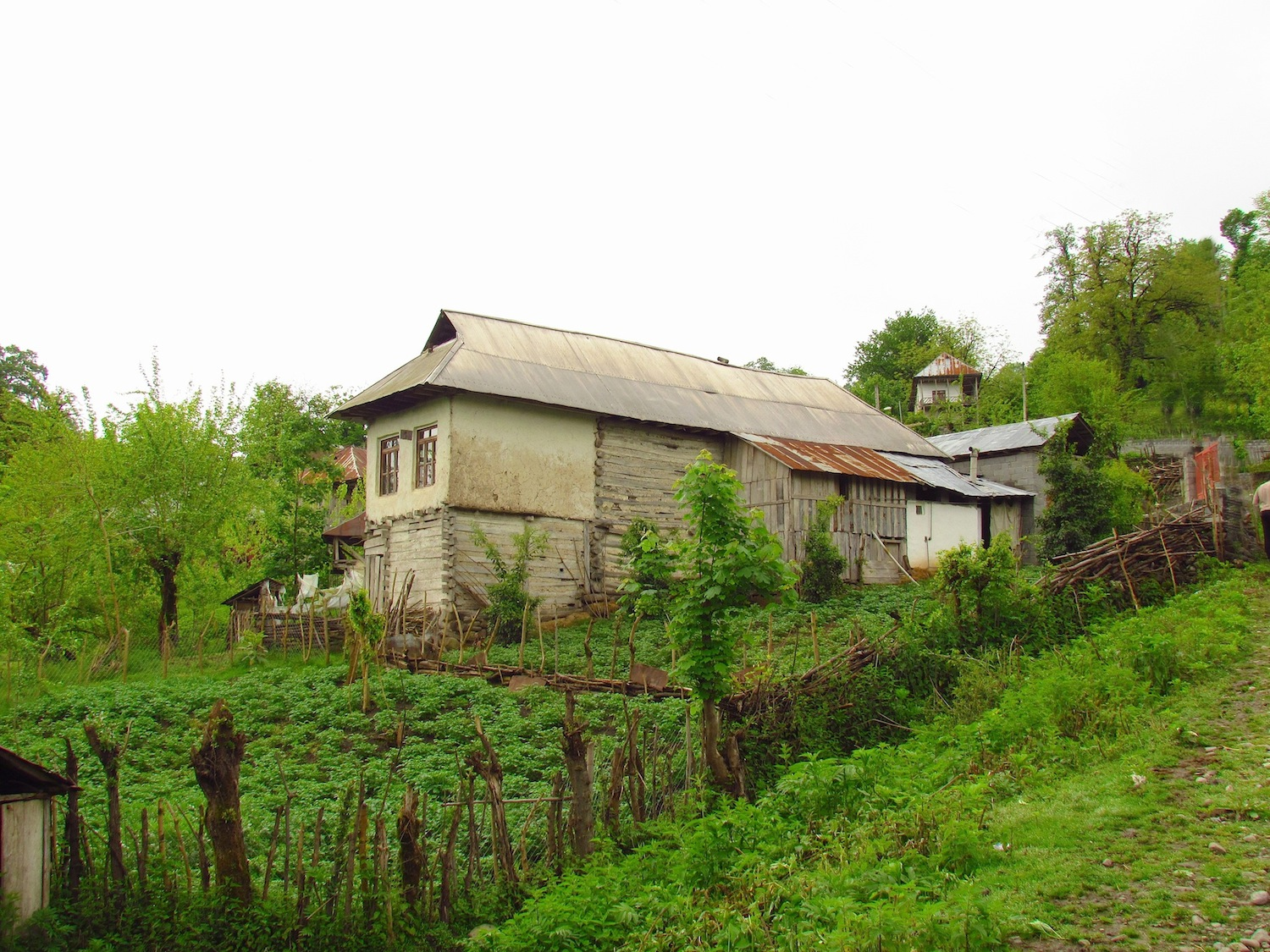

- Location within Iran
- Coordinates: 36°13′36″N 52°45′25″E
- Country: Iran
- Province: Mazandaran
- County: North Savadkuh
- Rural District: Lafur

Population (2016)
  - Total: 67
- Time zone: UTC+3:30 (IRST)

Tamar (Persian: تمر) is a village in Lafur Rural District, North Savadkuh County, Mazandaran Province, Iran. At the 2016 census, its population was 67, in 27 families. Down from 74 in 2006.
