= Pietro Antonio Magatti =

Italian painter (1691–1767)

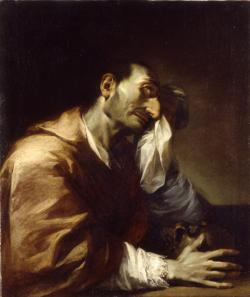
Portrait of Pietro Antonio Magatti, an Italian Painter

Pietro Antonio Magatti (20 June 1691 – 26 September 1767) was an Italian painter, active in Lombardy in a late-Baroque (barocchetto) style. Born in Varese, known for paintings and frescoes in his hometown, Milan, Pavia, Como, as well as in the Castello di Masnago. He trained with Giovanni Gioseffo dal Sole.

== Museum ==
- Städel Museum (Frankfurt), The Appearance of a Female Martyr
- Pinacoteca di Brera
- Museo Poldi Pezzoli
- Castello di Masnago
- Pinacoteca Malaspina, Musei Civici di Pavia
- Biblioteca Ambrosiana, Milan
