= Ernst Karl =

- Born: August 1945; Gaming, Lower Austria, Allied-occupied Austria
- Died: June 15, 2001 (aged 55); Krems an der Donau, Austria
- Status: Deceased
- Conviction: Murder (2 counts)
- Penalty: Life imprisonment

Details
- Victims: 3
- Span of crimes: 1968–1974
- Country: Austria

Ernst Karl (August 1945 – June 15, 2001) was an Austrian police officer who was convicted of murdering two burglars. While in prison, he also killed a convicted murderer and from then on he was designated as one of Austria's most dangerous offenders. In 2001, he died under controversial circumstances in a bed equipped with medical restraints in Stein Prison.

== Murders ==
On the night of April 15, 1968, Karl shot two burglars, Walter P. and Johann Kihsl in the garage of the Tivoli department store in Vienna-Meidling. He claimed to have watched the two men enter the garage during his patrol duty, after which he followed the two to confront them. However, when they noticed him, Karl claimed that they shot at him and that he returned fire in self-defense.

However, since the two men were killed with seven shots from close range, including headshots, the investigators doubted Karl's version of events, and initiated an investigation. Two friends of Kihsl testified that he knew a policeman who had given him a gun and advised him about the most appropriate time for a robbery. A police lineup was organized, and they identified Ernst Karl as the policeman. After a long interrogation, Karl reluctantly confessed to having intentionally shot the burglars in retaliation for blackmail. He had known them for some time and they had extorted him by threatening to expose his homosexuality. At the time, homosexual activity was a criminal offence in Austria, punishable by imprisonment for one to five years.

Karl paid them large amounts of hush money several times. However, as they demanded progressively larger amounts and Karl proposed to them a burglary at the Tivoli. Since he was scheduled to work that night, he promised to stand outside in uniform and ensure they could safely carry out the theft. After the men entered the garage, he followed them, convinced them to turn around by addressing them, and killed them. After shooting them in the head, he took the gun he had given Kihsl, and fired a shot with it to bolster his self-defense narrative.

Karl was sentenced to life imprisonment for the two murders and transferred to Stein Prison. There, on January 15, 1974, he strangled 41-year-old convicted murderer Johann Rogatsch with his bare hands in the detention center's recreation room. He claimed that he acted in self-defense after Rogatsch attempted to force him into a prison break, and attacked him when he refused. After this incident, he was transferred to a special detention center housing the most dangerous criminals of the prison, which at the time held only seven inmates.

== Death ==
Ernst Karl began to have repeated psychotic breaks as a result of his schizophrenia. He had delusions that he was still working as a police officer and was being shot at by the other inmates and followed by criminal gangs. As a result, he received psychiatric and medical treatment. On June 14, 2001, he had a severe psychotic episode which resulted in damage to his cell and during which his nose was broken. The on-duty in-house doctor, Dr. Stippler, administered biperiden to him and ordered for him to be accommodated in a specially secured room and to be strapped to a restraining bed to prevent self-harm. Judicial officials testified to having carried out checks every half hour and finding him sleeping peacefully, but he was nonetheless found dead the next morning. The cause of death was determined to be an ileus, and he was pronounced dead at 7:55 AM. Photos were released of the pale and lifeless prisoner strapped to the bed, in which blood was visible coming from his nose and mouth. The photos, along with the fact that restraining beds had been banned in Austrian prisons since 1994, led to public outcry and protests.

== Judicial inquiry ==
An investigation revealed that the bed was not a restraining bed of the kind that had been banned by Article 103 of the Penal Code in 1994, but a medical bed which was used as part of medical and psychiatric treatment, and that the same class of bed was also used for non-prisoners. Restraint in a medical bed of this kind, if seen as a medical necessity, was still allowed. This was the reasoning offered by the prison doctor.

The public prosecutor's office brought charges of negligent homicide against the officials and doctors who were on duty at the time of Karl's death. The case was examined by the Judiciary of Austria. Dr. Wolfgang Denk, a specialist in forensic medicine, wrote in a testimony dated April 8, 2002: "... Ernst K. died as a result of a intestinal obstruction in an area of pre-existing growths in the abdominal cavity, leading to cardiovascular failure... the death was natural, and the bed's restraining belts were not causally related to the incidence of the intestinal blockage." The Judiciary's prosecution was suspended on May 15, 2002, the previous surveys, because the prisoner was restrained in the hospital bed for medical reasons, and the death was determined to be due to natural causes.
