= Front Row at the Trump Show =

2020 non-fiction book by Jonathan Karl

- Book cover
- Author: Jonathan Karl
- Audio read by: Jonathan Karl
- Subject: Presidency of Donald Trump
- Genre: Non-fiction
- Publisher: E. P. Dutton
- Publication date: March 31, 2020
- Pages: 368
- Followed by: Betrayal: The Final Act of the Trump Show

Front Row at the Trump Show is a 2020 non-fiction book by Jonathan Karl about the first presidency of Donald Trump. Primarily focused on Karl's personal experiences covering President Donald Trump, it debuted on The New York Times Best Seller list.

The book received praise from critics, with The Guardian describing it as "a cautionary tale" during the COVID-19 pandemic. It was followed by a sequel, Betrayal: The Final Act of the Trump Show, in 2021.
