= Magdeburger Biographisches Lexikon =

German dictionary

The Magdeburger Biographische Lexikon (short MBL) is a specialized dictionary for biographies related to the city of Magdeburg and the surrounding districts of Börde, Jerichower Land, and the former Schönebeck Land. It is the definitive standard work for this subject area.

The 894-page encyclopaedia contains 1766 biographies of personalities who were born in the Magdeburg region or who became active in the region in a significant way. Only persons who died between 1800 and 2001 were included. In addition to politicians, the book includes entrepreneurs, athletes, scientists, artists, military leaders and regional originals.

The editors of the work are Guido Heinrich and Gunter Schandera. The texts come from about 350 different authors. The first presentation took place in Magdeburg's Cathedral of St. Sebastian. The foreword was written by the then Minister President of Saxony-Anhalt, Reinhard Höppner.

The MBL is also published in an online version, which was last expanded in April 2007 and has 1795 biographies.
