= Elfriede Karl =

Austrian politician (born 1933)

Elfriede Karl (born 14 September 1933 in Salzburg) is a retired Austrian politician and member of the Social Democratic Party of Austria. She was primarily engaged in family and women's affairs. Karl was a member of the National Council between 1974 and 1990.

Before entering politics, Karl had completed an apprenticeship as a clerk in the 1950s. She worked as a salesperson and later stenotypist. She was involved in organised labour and from 1961 worked for the Chamber for Workers and Employees.

Starting in 1971, Elfriede Karl was state secretary for family affairs in the Federal Chancellery under Chancellor Bruno Kreisky. In 1979, the Ministry of Finance became responsible for family policy, and Karl became a state secretary there. In 1983, when Fred Sinowatz became Chancellor of Austria, the Federal Ministry for Family, Youth and Consumer Protection was created with Elfriede Karl as its first minister. In 1975, while she was state secretary, Austrian abortion law was relaxed. During her time as family minister, the maximum length of parental leave in Austria was extended to two years and parents were granted the right to split their time on leave. Karl was also in favour of granting family benefits to unmarried couples and single parents.
