= Masnago Castle =

Castle in Masnago, Frazione of Varese, Italy

Coordinates: 45.8278017°N 8.8009681°E

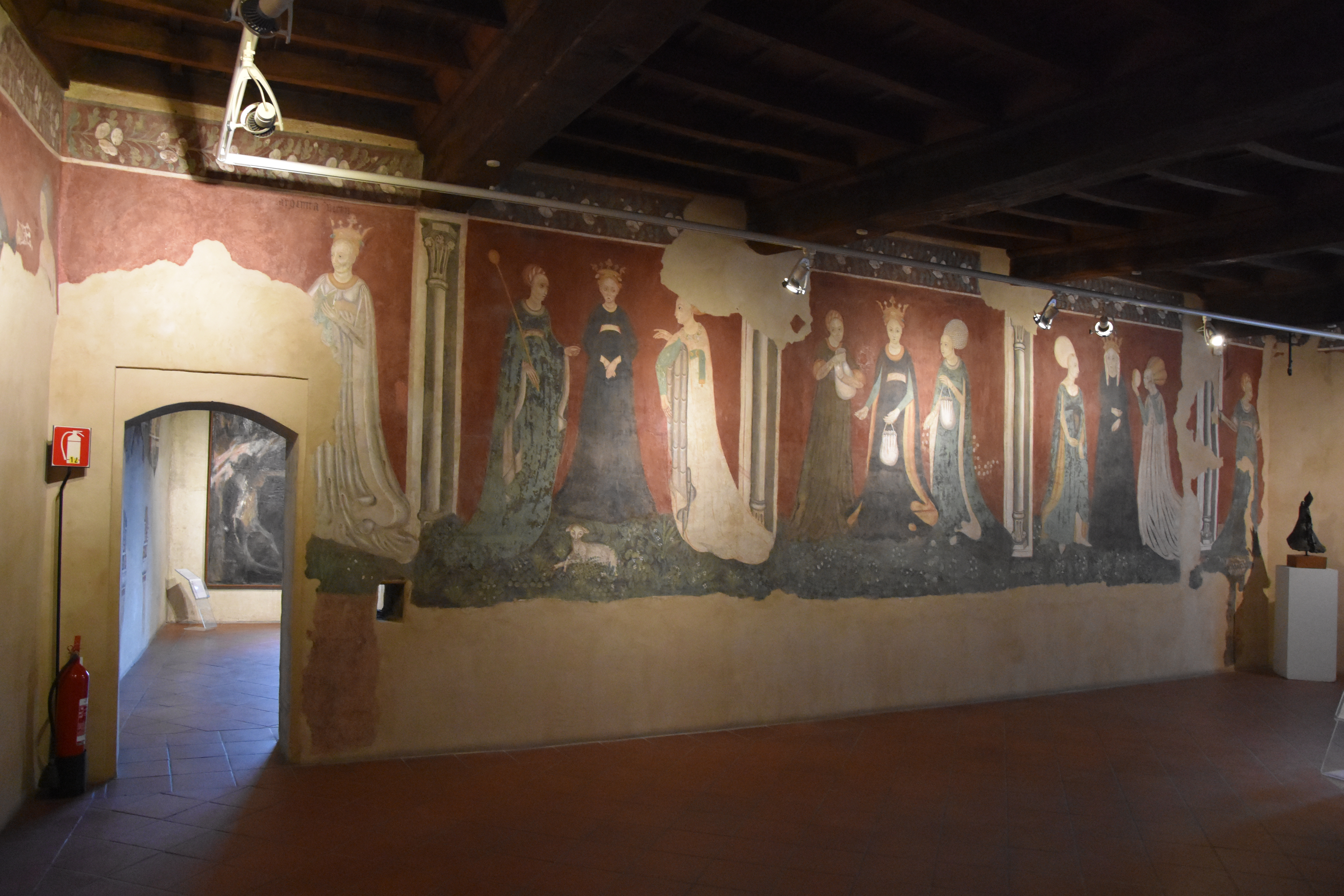
Sala dei Vizi e delle Virtù.

The Castello di Masnago is a castle, now a civic art museum, located atop a hill on Via Cola di Rienzo number 42 in Mantegazza Park in the quartiere of Masnago of the town of Varese, region of Lombardy, Italy. The oldest part of the castle is an 11th-century crenellated tower, much rebuilt over the centuries. On the ground floor, there is a frescoed room, the Sala degli Svaghi, and on the first floor, two exhibition rooms – Sala dei Vizi and delle Virtù. Some of the latter frescoes pertain to the 15th-century school of Bonifacio Bembo.

The art museum has works by the Procaccini family, del Pier Francesco Mazzucchelli (commonly Morazzone e di Pietro Antonio Magatti, among more modern artists are Innocente Salvini, Enrico Bay, and Renato Guttuso.

The Castello di Masnago stands on top of a large lawn.

== Parco Mantegazza ==
The Parco Mantegazza also contains a small botanical garden, which has numerous varieties of trees and shrubs. Inside, you can see and admire various types of plants typical of the Mediterranean vegetation, including the Leccio and the Corbezzolo.

== See also ==
- Villa Toeplitz
- Varese
