= Tamar Tavadze =

Georgian artist and architect (1898–1975)

Tamar Tavadze (1898–1975) was a Georgian artist, theatre painter, sculptor and architect. Tamar Tavadze was a student when she started working in Tbilisi State Opera and Ballet Theatre. She also worked in Moscow at the Great Theatre and the Feature Ballet Theatre where she actively participated in celebration activities. A number of Moscow streets were decorated on the basis of sketches she made.
