= Fred Carl =

Fred Carl may refer to:

- Fred Carl (baseball) (1858–1899), baseball player
- Fred Carl (politician), Montana State Senator
