= Villa Toeplitz =

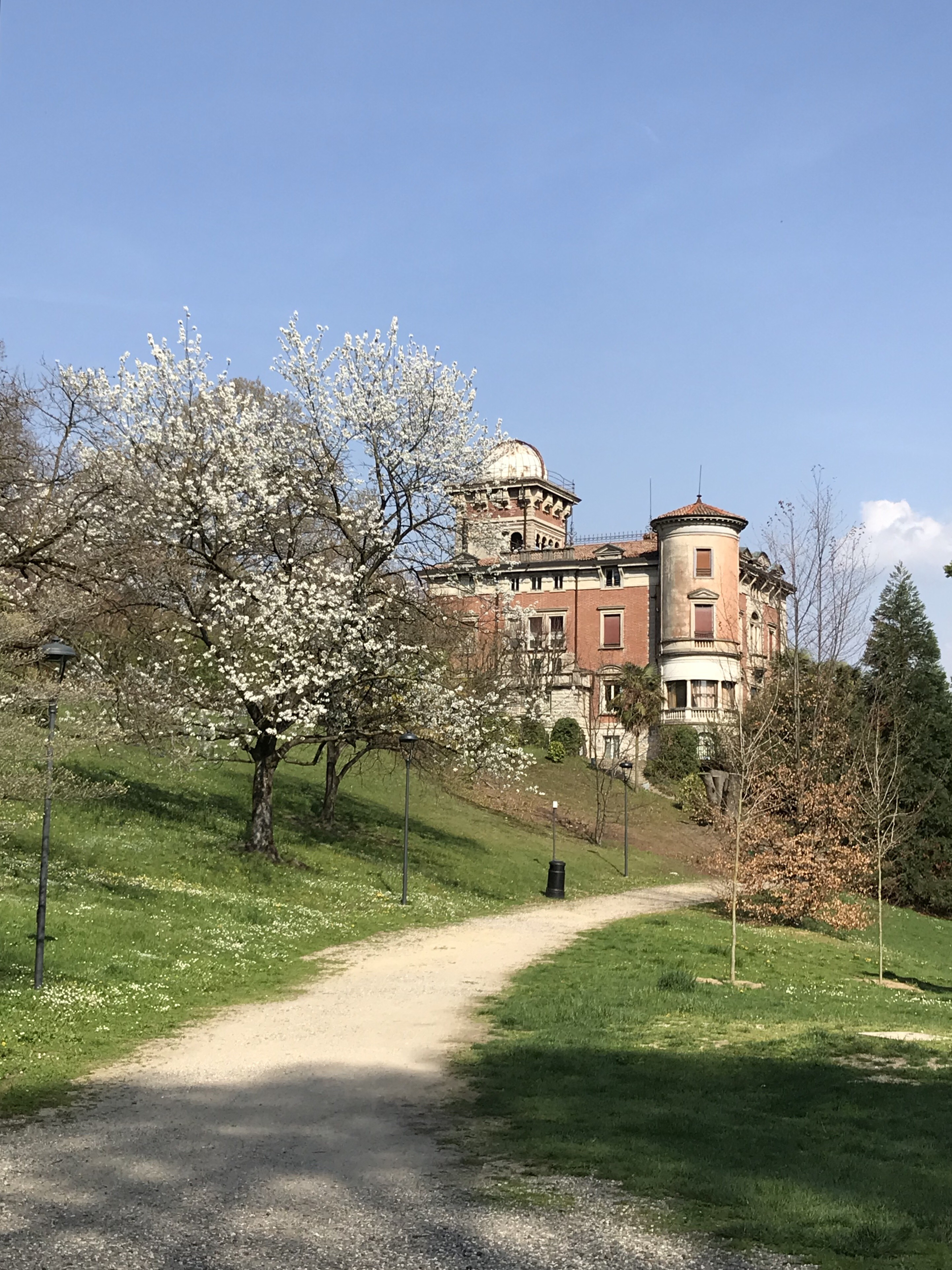

- Location within Lombardy Location within Italy

General information
- Type: Villa
- Architectural style: Eclecticism
- Location: Lombardy, Viale Giambattista Vico, 46 Sant'Ambrogio Olona, Varese, Italy
- Coordinates: 45°50′36.888″N 8°48′57.269″E
- Completed: 1901
- Owner: Municipality of Varese (from 1972)

Technical details
- Material: Bricks, stones, granite, iron, ceramic, marble, wood
- Size: 8 hectares (20 acres)

Design and construction
- Architect: Armando Brasini
- Engineer: Alfredo Speroni

Villa Toeplitz is a historic villa located in Varese, Lombardy, Italy. Construction was complete by 1901 and subsequently named after the banker Jósef Leopold Toeplitz (in Italian, Giuseppe Toeplitz), who bought the villa in 1914. It previously belonged to the Hannesens, a German family that used it as a country holiday house.

Villa Toeplitz is considered one of the ten most beautiful parks in Italy thanks to its carefully designed gardens, scenic fountains and water features. The villa also houses the headquarters of the Faculty of Communication Sciences of the University of Insubria, as well as the Ethno-Archeological Museum Castiglioni.

== History ==
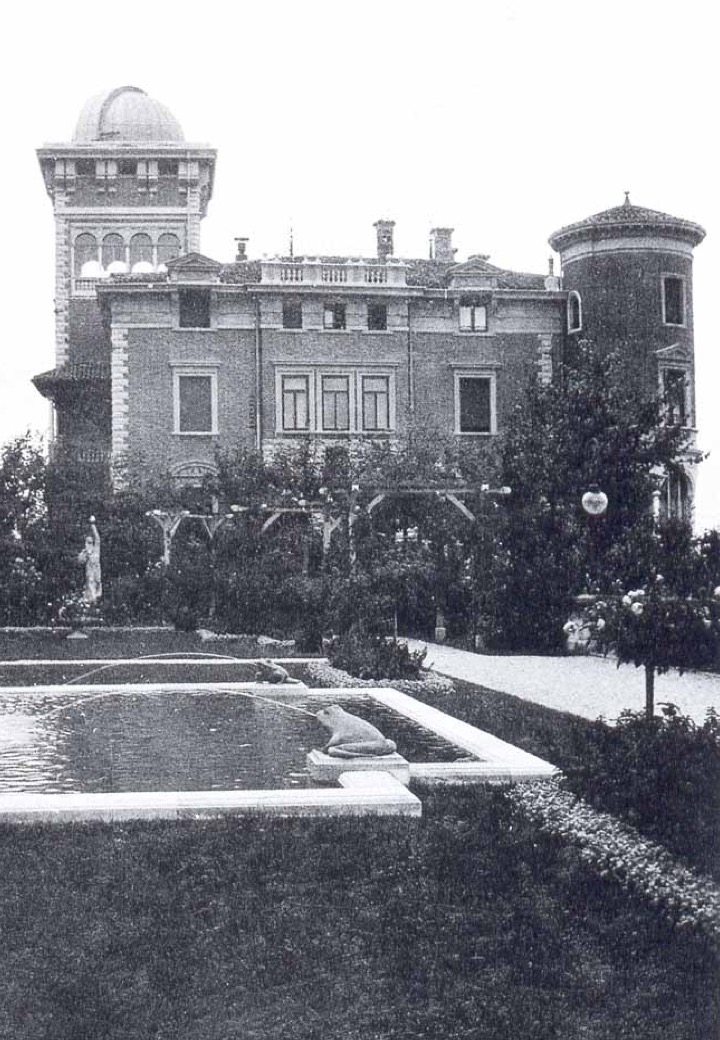
Villa Toeplitz, Varese, with the so-called "Frog fountain"

Villa Toeplitz was built on a hill in the Varese district of Sant'Ambrogio Olona, in the centre of a complex of orchards and farm buildings. It is one of 120 villas in a municipality that has 73% of the landscape protected. The villa was created as a country residence for the German Frey family. The Varese engineer Alfredo Speroni renovated the dwelling, having designed the original nucleus of the house, which was then handed over to the Hannesen family. In 1914 the founder of Banca Commerciale Italiana, Giuseppe Toeplitz, bought the building and it subsequently became known as Villa Toeplitz.

Giuseppe Toeplitz commissioned the Varese engineer Speroni to completely transform the residence. Due to World War I, the building was eventually re-opened in 1918. Speroni and the Roman architect Armando Brasini modified the existing building and made significant developments to the surrounding park, which was expanded to 8 hectares. Villa Toeplitz's park includes the main villa, the residential villa (dépendance) and the porter's lodge. The park was divided into several components: the orchard; a lawn area; access roads to the Villa; patches of shrubs and groups of trees; a "wood" of conifers and exotic plants; a lookout and chapel on the upper part of the property; a hornbeam rock; areas for bowls, tennis courts and croquet games; a flower garden; a swimming pool (today a pond); and, a wood-aged chestnut. The original orchard disappeared following the expansion of Sant'Ambrogio's cemetery, where the remains of the Toeplitz spouses are buried. There were also greenhouses (now abandoned) and some small stables. In 2010, due to the demolition of old cattle sheds and a no longer functioning water derivation room, an area was renovated for public access.

Internal renovations included an attic above the first floor, a small balcony with arches and pilasters carved on the east side and a tower with a metal dome where an astronomical mirror was installed, under the direction of Professor Bianchi, director of the Brera Astronomical Observatory. Toeplitz projected a full hydraulic engineering project to channel the water of the nearby Monte Martica river into the gardens' attractions. These water features included a monumental stairway and porphyry waterfalls, mosaic, fountains and grey Carrara marble. They were modified by Toeplitz with the planting of cypress hedges and coniferous tree patches. Today the original water features no longer function.

The main building was completed towards the end of the 1920s and the villa became a place of cultural and artistic meetings organized by the Polish dancer and actress Edvige Mrozowska, Giuseppe Toeplitz's second wife, who was passionate about music, art and astronomy. Edvige Toeplitz created and promoted the park's layout and symmetry, influenced by her personal journeys and the places she had visited. During a trip to Kashmir, Mrs. Edvige was inspired by the gardens of the Mongol Emperor Babur (known as "the father of gardens"), and incorporated the style used by the Mughal Empire, following the canons of Islamic architecture. This included the presence of ponds, fountains and canals at the edges of the walkways. Edvige Toeplitz's interests in botanical collecting and astronomy also influenced the origin and history of the park, specifically her importation of exotic plants and the construction of a small Observatory. When Giuseppe Toeplitz died in 1938, the villa and the park were inherited by his wife and his son Ludovico who, after the end of the Second World War, ceded them to the Mocchetti brothers from Legnano.

In 1972 the property was acquired by the Municipality of Varese, which decided to open the park to the public. The Villa currently houses one of the decentralized offices of the University of Insubria.

Villa Toeplitz was used as a filming location for the 1968 film Una jena in cassaforte (A Hyena in a Safe) by director Cesari Canevari. The cast included Dmitri Nabokov, Maria Luisa Greisberger, Ben Salvador, Alex Morrison, Karina Kar, Cristina Gajoni and Otto Tinard.

== Villa ==
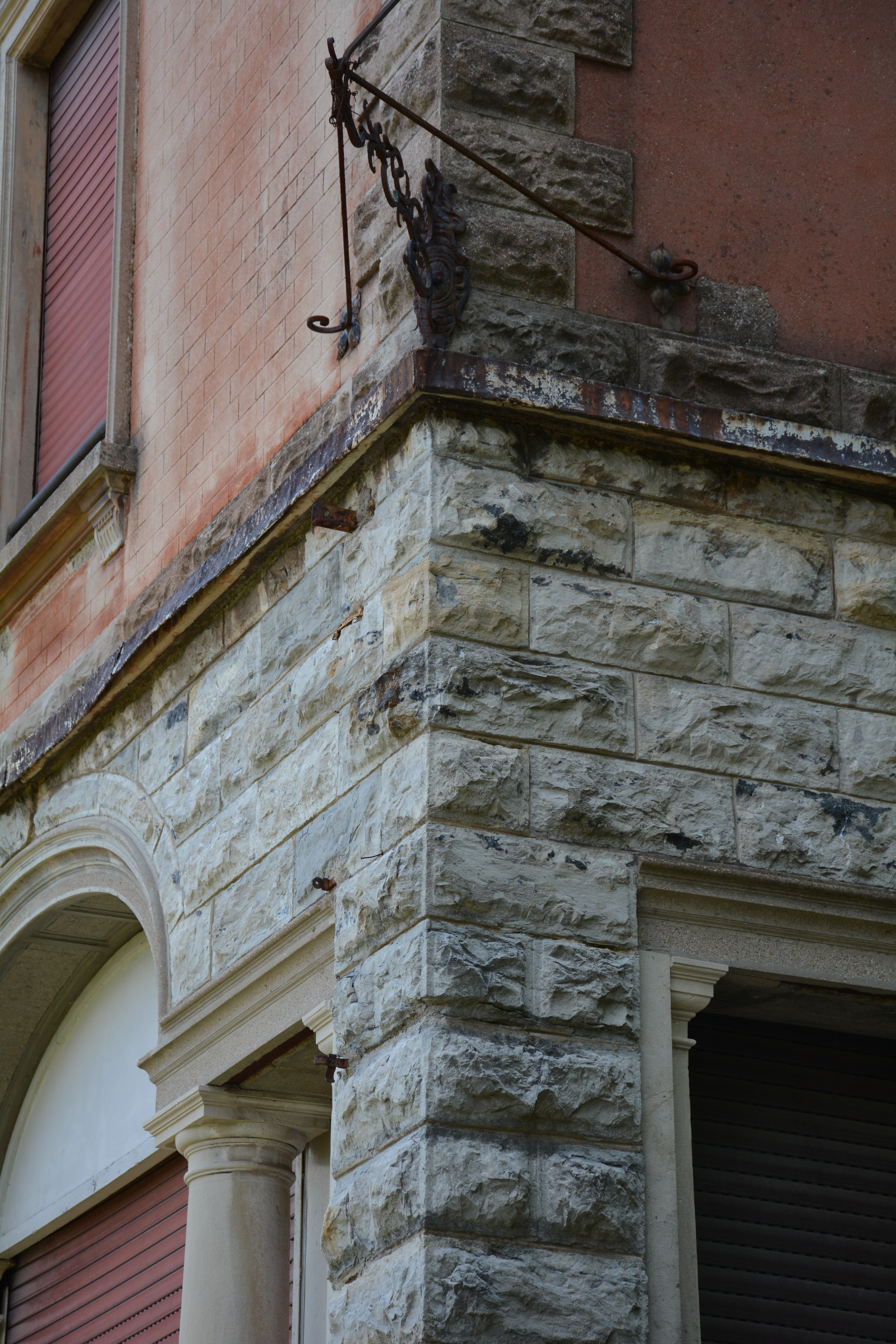
Villa Toeplitz, Ashlar

The location of the villa provides extensive views of the Valceresio, the Olona Valley, the Mendrisiotto and part of the Comasco. The building has an eclectic architectural style, created by a mix of construction materials and approaches. These include the Lombard style of reusing existing materials, the 19th-century traditions of the architect Camillo Boito, and the use of Renaissance models that recall classical and mannerist art. Brick masonry is embedded in terracotta, and ashlar used on the ground floor. The grey stone that adorns the lower part of the building was obtained from the limestone quarries above nearby Barasso.

=== Embellishments commissioned by Toeplitz ===
The villa was substantially restructured by Jósef Leopold Toeplitz in the years immediately after the First World War when he bought the existing building from the German industrialist Eugene Hannesen. The works, inspired by his second wife, continued until 1926, under the guidance of the prominent Roman architect Armando Brasini, known for his eclectic and visionary style. Once the renovation work was completed, the building became Toeplitz's favourite residence, and also a meeting place where famous names from the Italian and international economic, industrial and artistic scene stayed.

=== Call to Palladium ===
The upper floor is characterized by a loggia to give light to the panoramic room with arches closed by windows interrupted by a niche. A large panoramic terrace is located on the west side of the villa. It is furnished with two large flowerbeds under which there is an exedra fountain with a semi-dome cap decorated with rays to simulate a shell. On the lower side of this facade of the building, there are thermal windows that recall those used by Andrea Palladio in Villa Foscari, called the "Malcontenta". Other peculiar characteristics of the manor house are the use of the serliana and, above the windows, lunettes and gables, generally painted or decorated. The covers of the loggia above the main entrance and that of the tower are wooden coffered ceilings. Other interesting elements of the Italian floral or Art Nouveau style are, for example, the wrought iron with their decorations and the dormer windows on the upper floor that go over the cornice of the building interrupting the eaves.

=== Internal decor ===
The interiors of the villa are characterized by marble staircases, parquet floors in the rooms, ceramic in the service rooms, painted wooden doors and decorated coffered ceilings. The reception room on the ground floor is uninterrupted and is still furnished as it was in the days of the Toeplitz family, with inlaid chessboard tables, a bar corner in solid wood and antique armchairs.

=== Dome and observatory ===
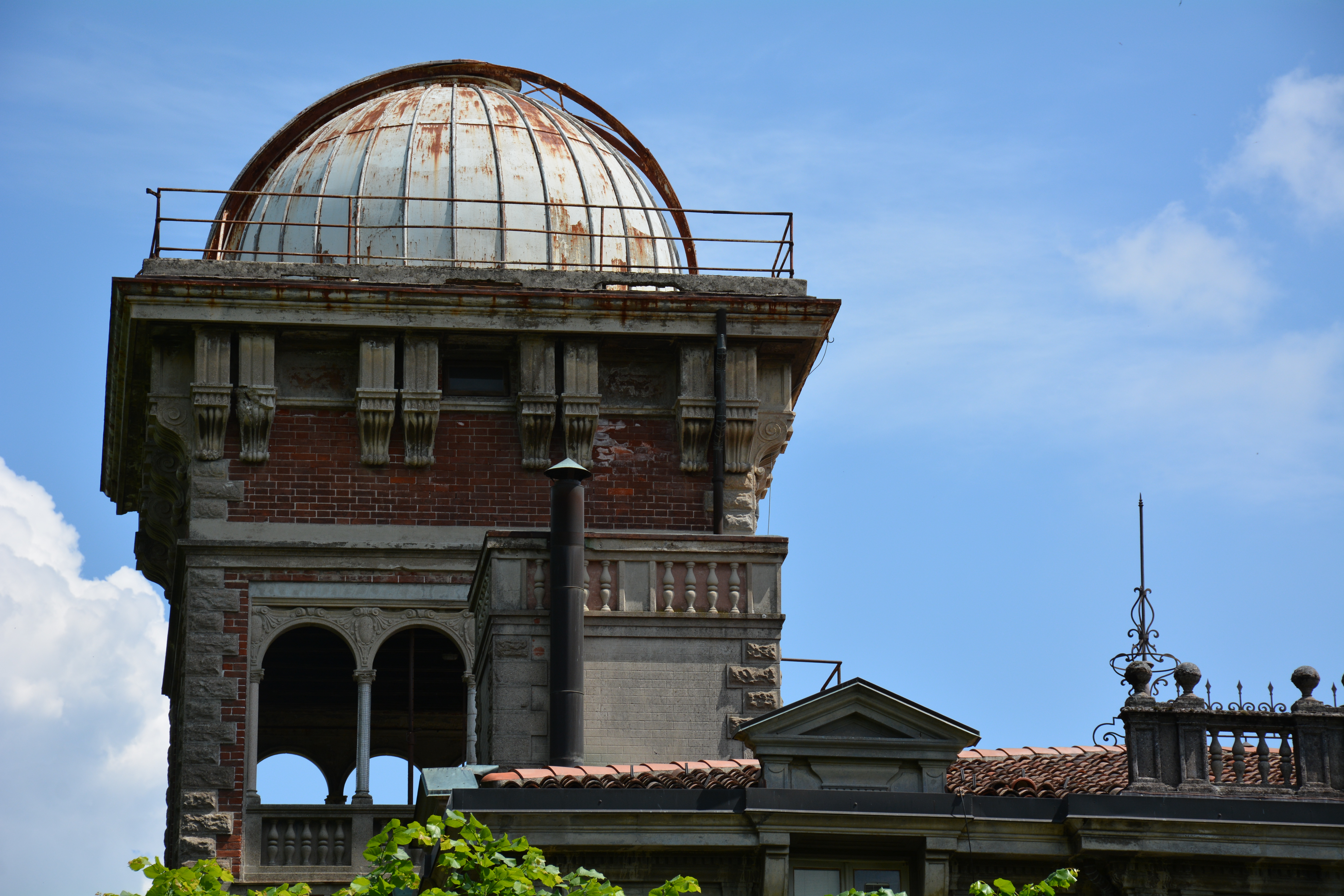
Villa Toeplitz, Dome and observatory

In the project for the extension of the building immediately after the purchase by Toeplitz, an important step in the work of the architect Brasini was the design and planning of a tower crowned by an arched loggia, four on each side. The arches support the roof structure with an openable metal dome used as a scientific observatory. The mirror was made with the collaboration and supervision of Professor Emilio Bianchi, director of the Brera Astronomical Observatory and creator of the Planetarium of Milan. During the Second World War, the presence of the high tower led the Germans to suspect that it was used for secret communications by Mrs. Toeplitz.

Edvige Mrozowska had to defend herself from the suspicion of being a spy in the service of the allies. At the end of the Second World War, the villa was sold by Mrs. Toeplitz and her son to a private company, the "Colchide Prima", belonging to the Mocchetti brothers of Legnano. In 1972 the complex became the property of the Municipality, which used it for many years as a school.

== From guest house to the Ethno-Archeological Museum Castiglioni ==
Along the road that leads to the manor house, there is the building that Toeplitz designed to accommodate prominent figures that the banker welcomed in Varese. These included the Duke of Abruzzi, the writer Matilde Serao, the Agnelli, the Pirelli and, probably, Gabriele D'Annunzio. The building, externally, utilizes the characteristic materials of Lombard architecture and consists of a brick facade in the lower part and plaster in the upper half. The decorations in coloured bands, mainly in blue and gold, stand out in the upper part, under the roof, typical of early 20th-century architecture.

Today it hosts the Castiglioni Museum, housing an ethnoarchaeological collection of thousands of finds, donated by the brothers Alfredo and Angelo Castiglioni to the Municipality of Varese. In sixty years of research in the archaeological, anthropological and ethnological fields throughout the African continent, the two brothers collected and catalogued artefacts of the material and religious life of various ethnic groups, and made precise photo-cinematographic documentation.

The archaeological section on the ground floor houses Egyptian and prehistoric finds. These include the graffiti casts of Bergiug and exhibits on where and how gold was mined at the time of the Egyptian pharaohs. It also tells the stories of the discovery of Berenice Pancrisia, (the "all gold city" mentioned by Pliny the Elder in his "Naturalis Historia"), the origin of the silica glass, (the mysterious "glass of the stars", already known at the time of Tutankhamon), and the origin of the emeralds used since the time of Cleopatra.

The upstairs ethnographic section describes traditional populations from savannah and desert environments. These include exhibits of the typical elaborate hairstyles of the Nile Camiti, shepherds of the African savannah (Kenya, Tanzania, Uganda) and other objects of their material culture. A multimedia room reveals an original Tuareg people, telling the story of the customs and traditions of the "blue men". It is unique for the quality and variety of its exhibits.

== Gardens ==
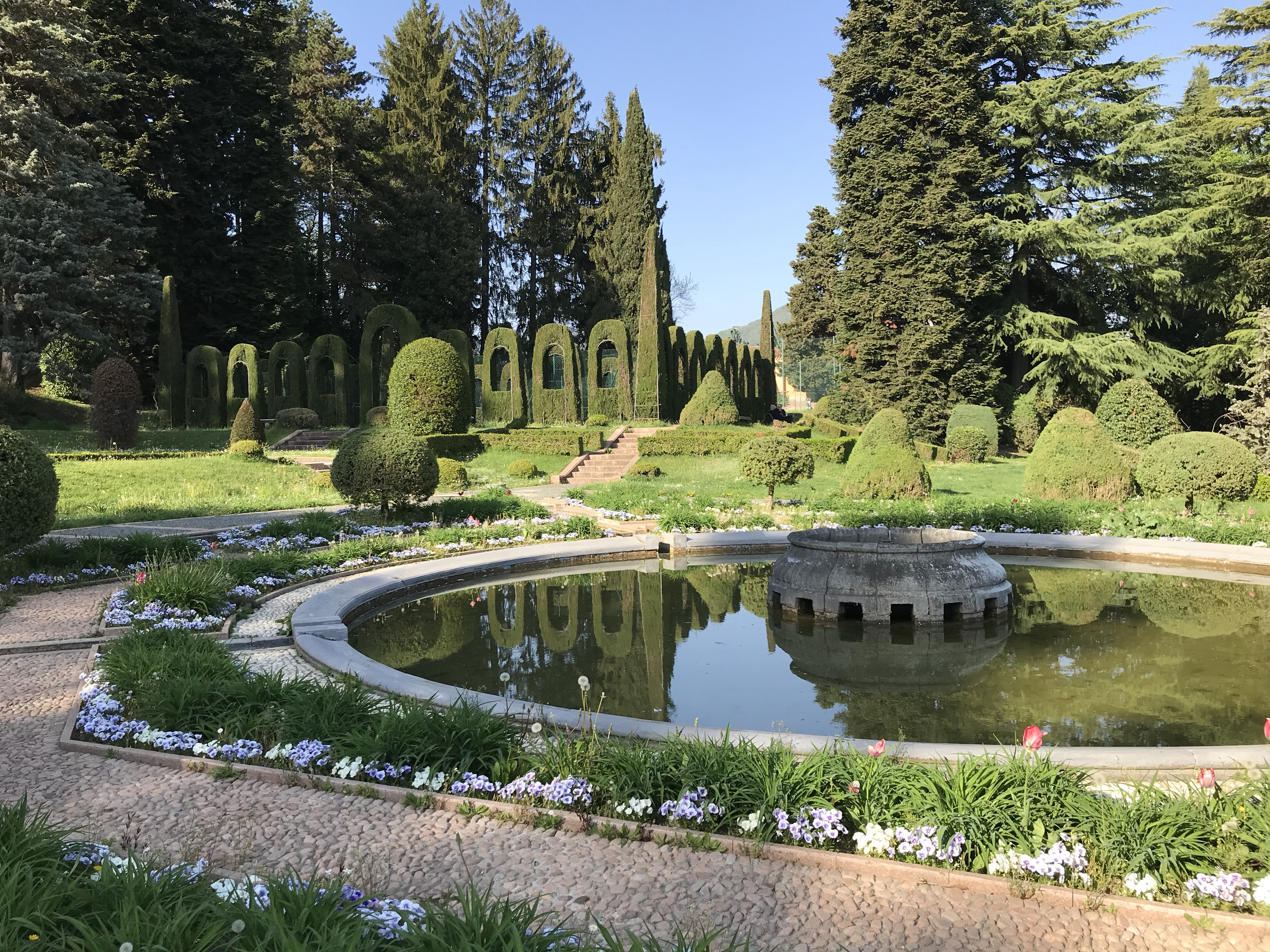
Villa Toeplitz, Gardens

Villa Toeplitz's Gardens consist of 8 hectares. They are connected by a "complex" pathways running through a connected system of exotic plans, fountains and buildings. The Park was designed in 1927 by the Parisian studio L. Collin – A. Adam & C.

Two different gardening styles compose the main Villa Toeplitz's Gardens: a "specifically formal" Giardino all'italiana, characterized by low boxwood bushes and cypress trees; and an English landscape garden, with beech trees, oaks and cedar trees. A part of the park is currently occupied by a large chestnut wood, penetrated by tracks leading to a "deep nature contacting experience". The park also contains a series of fountains, waterfalls and symmetrical topiary architectures, that characterize the early origins of the garden. A natural pathway runs through a chestnut wood in the northern part of the gardens immediately behind the villa, from the southern entrance of the gardens to the northern one. It is composed of "sinuous and romantic" alleys that are interrupted by small hills and "elegant" iron gazebos. At the end of the promenade, a children's playground and a bocce field has been installed by the Administration of the City of Varese. On 21 December 1972, the Toeplitz Gardens, as well as the Villa, were acquired by the administration of the City of Varese.

=== Styles ===
The structure of the Gardens defines a division between two specific gardening styles: an "intricate" and "elegant" structure that characterize a typical Giardino all'Italiana contrasting with a more natural environment composing a more moderate English Garden.

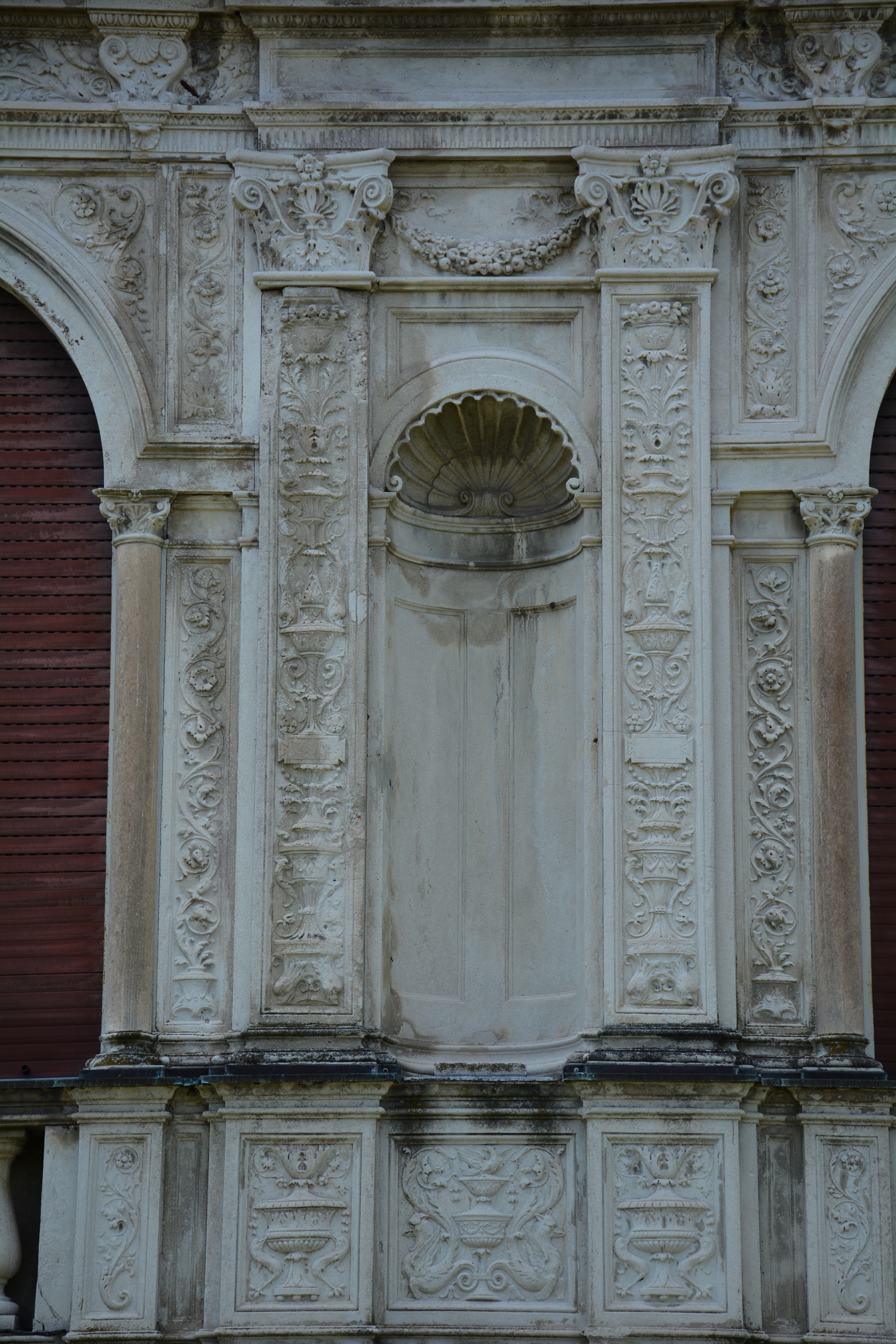
Villa Toeplitz, Exedera facade manor house

The southern part of the garden, all'Italiana, hosts refined constructions, both vegetal and non, made by gardening architects coming from the whole province. The boxwood tree was used to create topiary bushes and balloons, along with the ivy trees, while cypress trees were used to create two imponent castles. Elaeagnus bushes form an intricate system of mazes.

Deeper in the gardens, right below the belvedere, several fountains take place. Within these architectural elements, water games and water shows used to take place in the Gardens' fountains. Due to the dryness of the source that used to aliment the fountains, the water games are no longer performed.

The high number of fountains, waterfalls, topiaries and "little canals inspired by the Kashmir Gardens oriental tradition" present in the Garden, they identify it as "eclectic".

A Chestnut wood is located in the north-east part of the Gardens, just behind the villa. It was planted when the Toepliz family moved to the Villa and its heavy growth is due to the favourable climate of the Varese province, where the chestnut is one of the most widespread plants. The Chestnut wood is part of a wide economic circle in the Varese zone, the so-called "Chestnut Economy". Chestnut trees are an important resource since they are raw materials for different fields of the economy of the province. "Chestnut wood is used to make furniture, barrels, roof beams, posts fencing or stakes, as firewood and in the production of charcoal" and like so to aliment the local economy. The chestnut wood of Villa Toeplitz has also the function of "beekeeping": because "bees are very attracted by male chestnut flowers and the subsequent honey production is large".

The chestnut wood, along with a series of artificial lakes and wide alleys, composes the second part of the garden, the English landscape garden.

=== Fountains, nymphaeum and chapel ===
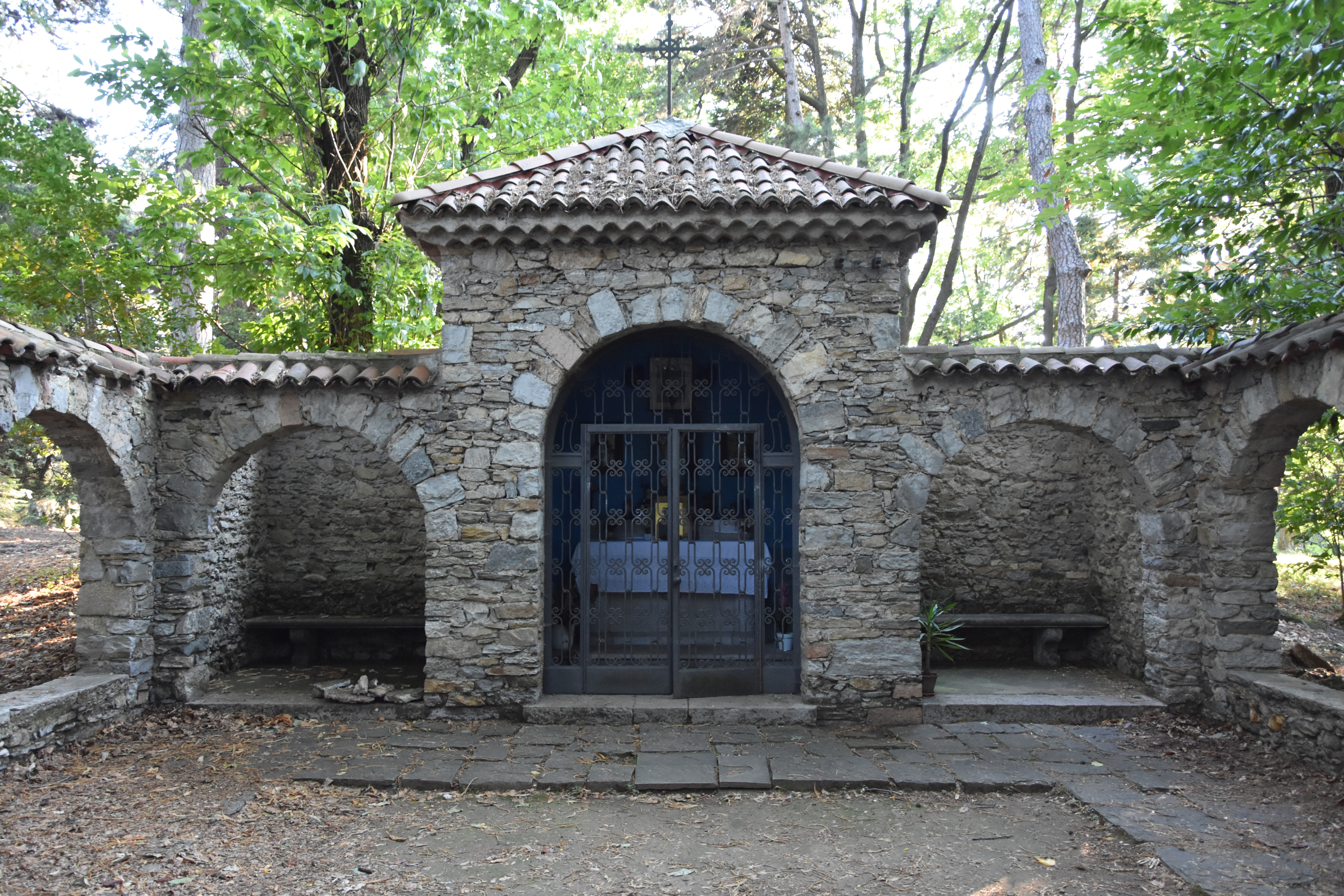
The chapel

The monumental fountain of the Villa is divided into three levels. The whole structure of the fountain is located on the side of a small hill. It is considered one of the most relevant elements of the gardens.

The lowest level is located at the centre of the main boulevard that goes from the entrance to the actual Villa. On its left side, there is an extended field in an elliptical form that is the base of a complex and elaborated path walk. The middle level is divided into other three parts accurate and symmetric, delimitated by hedges of shrubs and a complex mesh of canals, tanks and water games. On the third level there are several fountains and terraces that lead to a nymphaeum, below the belvedere, decorated with granite columns and internal tanks in majolica. The levels of the fountain are connected by a water chain from the 15th century, composed by tanks in pink porphyry.

On the top of the hill, behind the belvedere, the Toeplitz family built a chapel. The project was entrusted to the architect Goraska, that came appositely from Poland. The interiors of the chapel are decorated by frescos that were painted by Jan Henryk Rosen di Leopoli, who also did the one in the cemetery in St. Ambrogio.

=== Panoramic bridge, orchard and cemetery ===
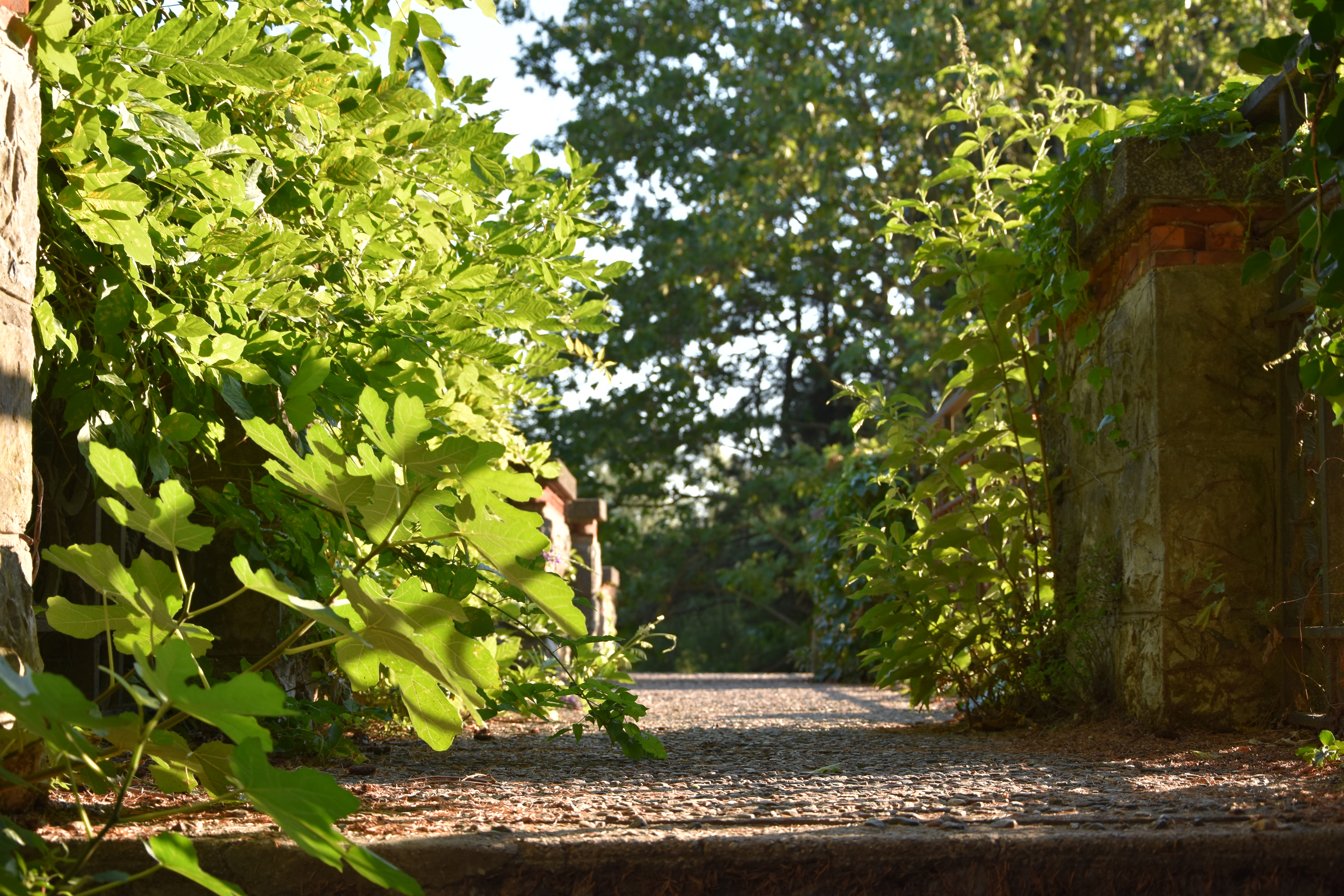
The bridge

A panoramic bridge, provided with two arches and a decorative oculus, runs along the old Toeplitz's property through "via dei Mulini Grassi". Giuseppe Toeplitz asked for permission to build it with the aim to facilitate the connection between the Gardens, that he bought years later to build the orchard and the other side of the street. The company that had the task to build the bridge, requested to have with a height of at least 5 metres, is named Zanzi. The construction was concluded in 1924.

In the orchard there were mainly cultivated apple, pear and peach trees with the espalier technique that helps the tree to have a flat structure. Both Giuseppe Toeplitz and Edvige Mrozowska had a strong passion for floriculture and fruit farming, but in particular the woman, that used to ask suggestions to expert agronomists, and that was always flanked by the Tuscan gardener Quinto Brilli.

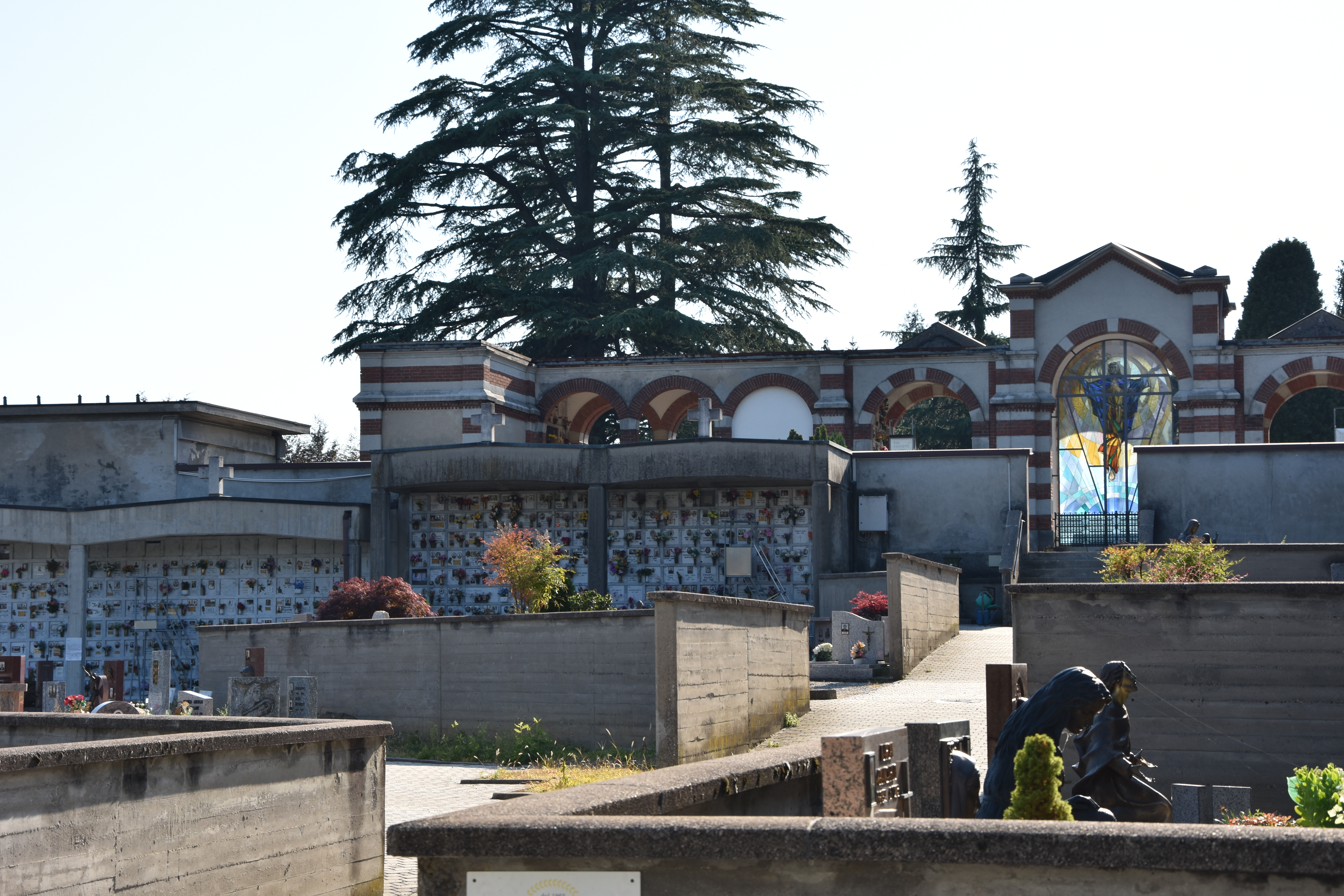
Sant'Ambrogio's cemetery

The particular technique used in the cultivation of apples and pears made it possible for Edvige to take part in several competitions, often winning and gaining different honours. On each fruit and vegetable's peel, she used to put a monogram of a letter (T) to sign her creations. Giuseppe Toeplitz, according to all the workers' memories, was really dedicated to the care of the plants in the greenhouse. Every night, he used to check his plants, even if it was late.

The two spouses are both residing in St.Ambrogio cemetery in one chapel with the woman's parents. The disposition of the headstones respects the Slavic tradition and is simple and minimal, while the outside reflects the union of several styles. The couple has been relevant for the history and development of the city of Varese, even though they are not frequently considered or remembered in the present society, probably for the lack of heirs and so the lack of care for their chapel.

=== Bird snare and tower ===
Villa Toeplitz's Gardens host a series of bird snares that were once dedicated to bird hunting, an activity that was long practised by Mr Toeplitz. The bird snare is the first element of the hunting set, and one of such is located by the main body of the Villa. The first bird snares were made in the 14th century by a small group of friars, and they started to be used in Lombardy and other regions in the north of Italy. It is made of two parts: the first component is a building made mainly of stones that, like the one in Toeplitz's Gardens, is the tower, a building developed on three levels, all with different functions. The lowest one was made for meetings, the middle one was where the birds that were used to beckon other birds rested, and the top part was used by the hunters to look for birds. The second component is an arboreal structure positioned in a circle called colonnade with a red oak at the centre.

== Flora and fauna ==
=== Flora ===
The current botanical collections of Villa Toeplitz reflect the historic influence and international travels of Edvige Toeplitz during the garden's original creation. These include:

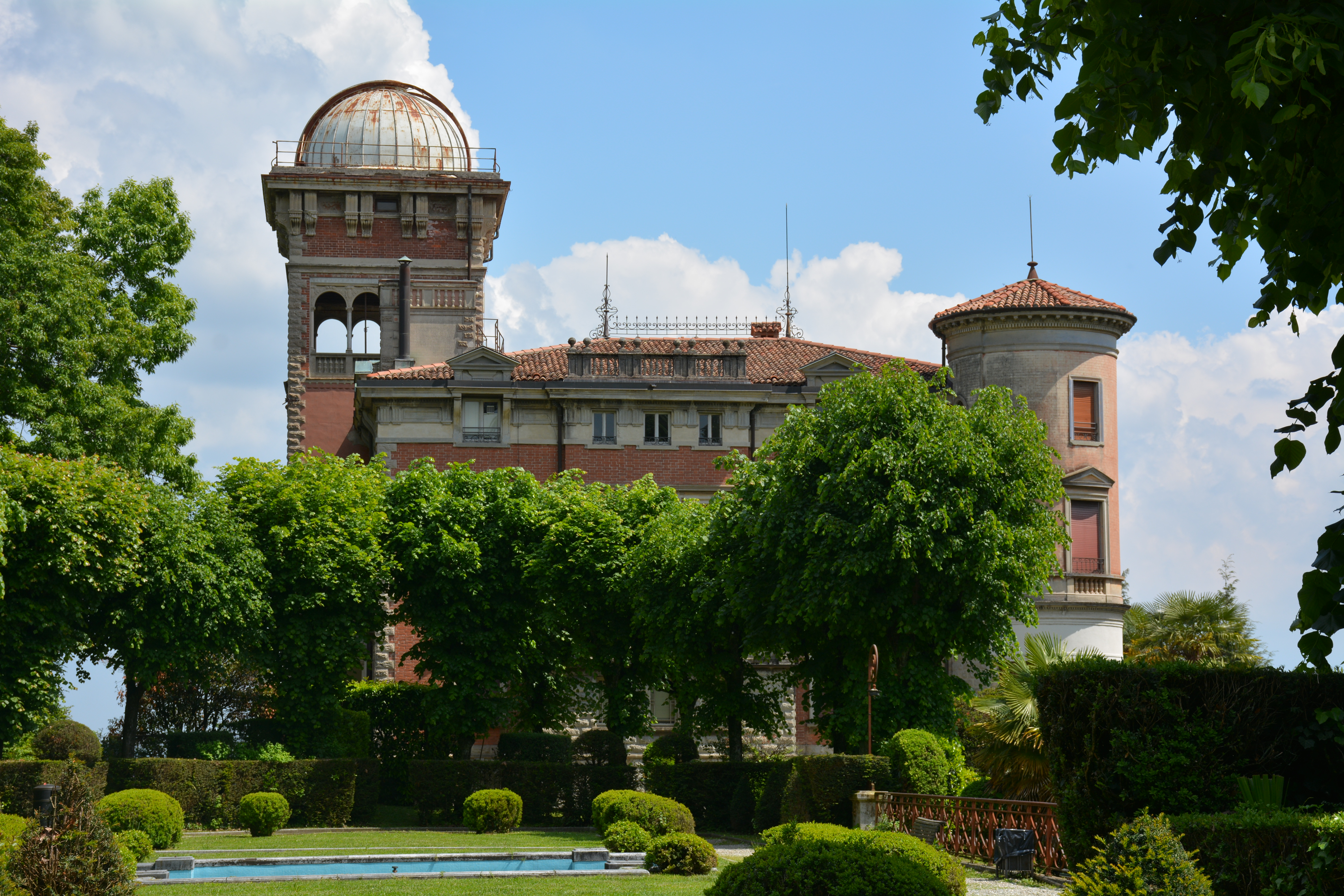
Villa Toeplitz, Catalpa tree in front

- Alnus glutinosa
- Acer palmatum
- Acer pseudoplatanus
- Quercus ilex
- Catalpa
- Aucuba japonica
- Corylus avellana
- Diospyros kaki
- Elaeagnus pungens
- Sequoiadendron giganteum
- Abies nordmanniana
- Pinus strobus
- Cedrus libani

=== Fauna ===
The Chestnut Forest is home to a wide variety of wildlife: notably insects, amphibians, and small mammals, some of which are relatively rare. These species can all live virtually undisturbed since the forest is rarely visited by humans. In recent years, the populations of toads and frogs in the forest have grown, partly as a result of conservation efforts. Since the middle of April 2019, over 300,000 tadpoles and larvae have been moved from an area affected by restoration work in the park and they have been rehoused in a safer location in the central pool in front of the Villa. This work was carried out in collaboration with the Municipality of Varese and it made it possible to identify the presence of several common toads (Bufo bufo), in particular 25 females and 29 males, about thirty salamanders, some Lataste frogs (Rana latastei) and green frogs (Pelophylax esculentus) at the adult stage. These amphibians will populate the park's wooded areas, enriching their biodiversity and relevance. Public appreciation of these delicate amphibians is growing, particularly during this metamorphosis phase their life cycle. On 22 June 2019, for example, the LIPU, Legambiente, Gev, and Royal Rangers associations organised a meeting concerning the importance of preserving amphibians, in particular emphasising why they should not be disturbed or captured and showing the relevance of the park's biodiversity conservation project.

== Similar historic villas ==
Villa Toeplitz is one of many historic villas in Varese; some others are:

- Palazzo Estense
- Villa Recalcati
- Villa Menafoglio Litta Panza
- Ville Ponti
- Villa Baragiola
- Castello di Masnago
- Villa Torelli Mylius
- Villa Augusta
- Villa Mirabello

== Gallery ==
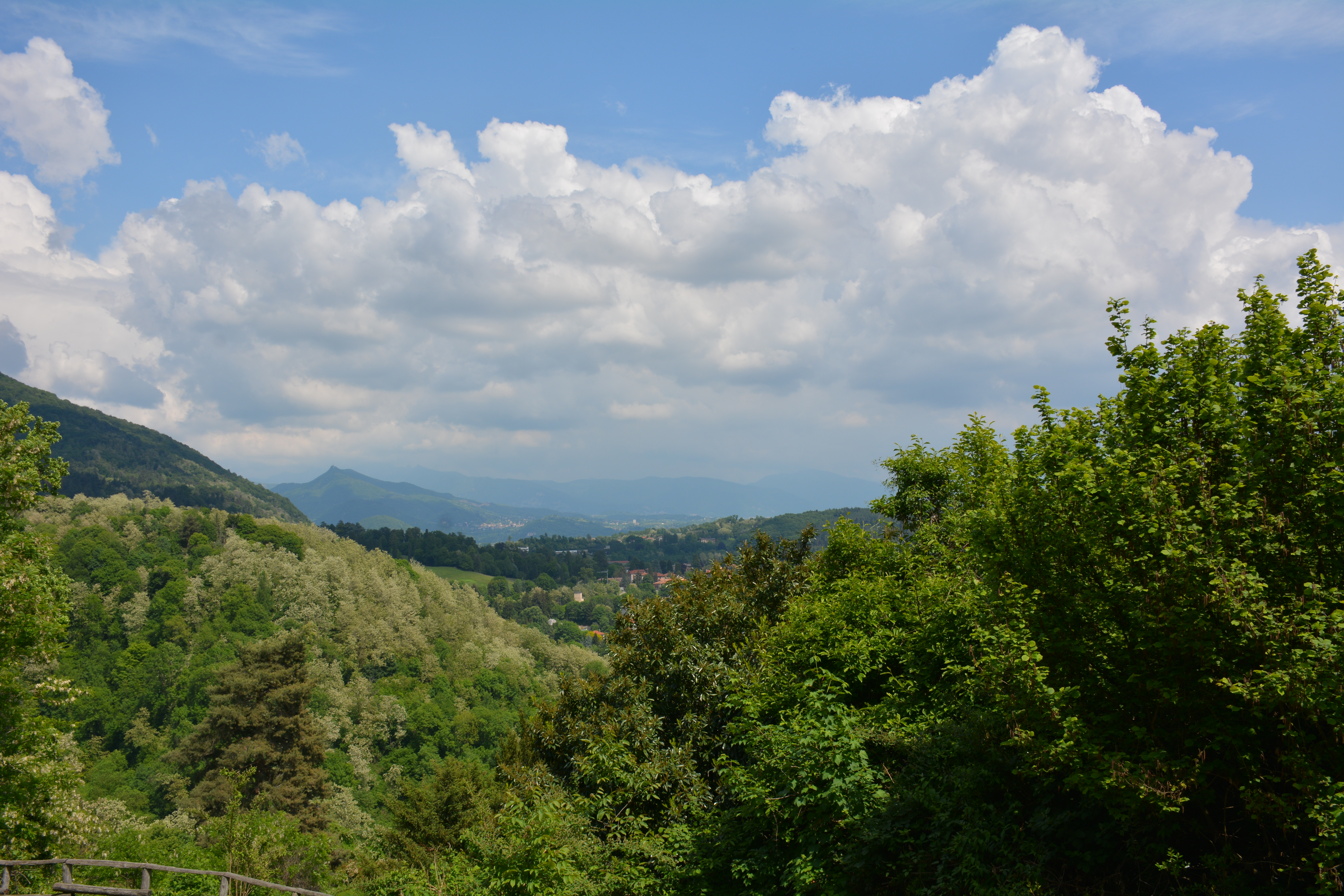
Villa Toeplitz, View from the main balcony

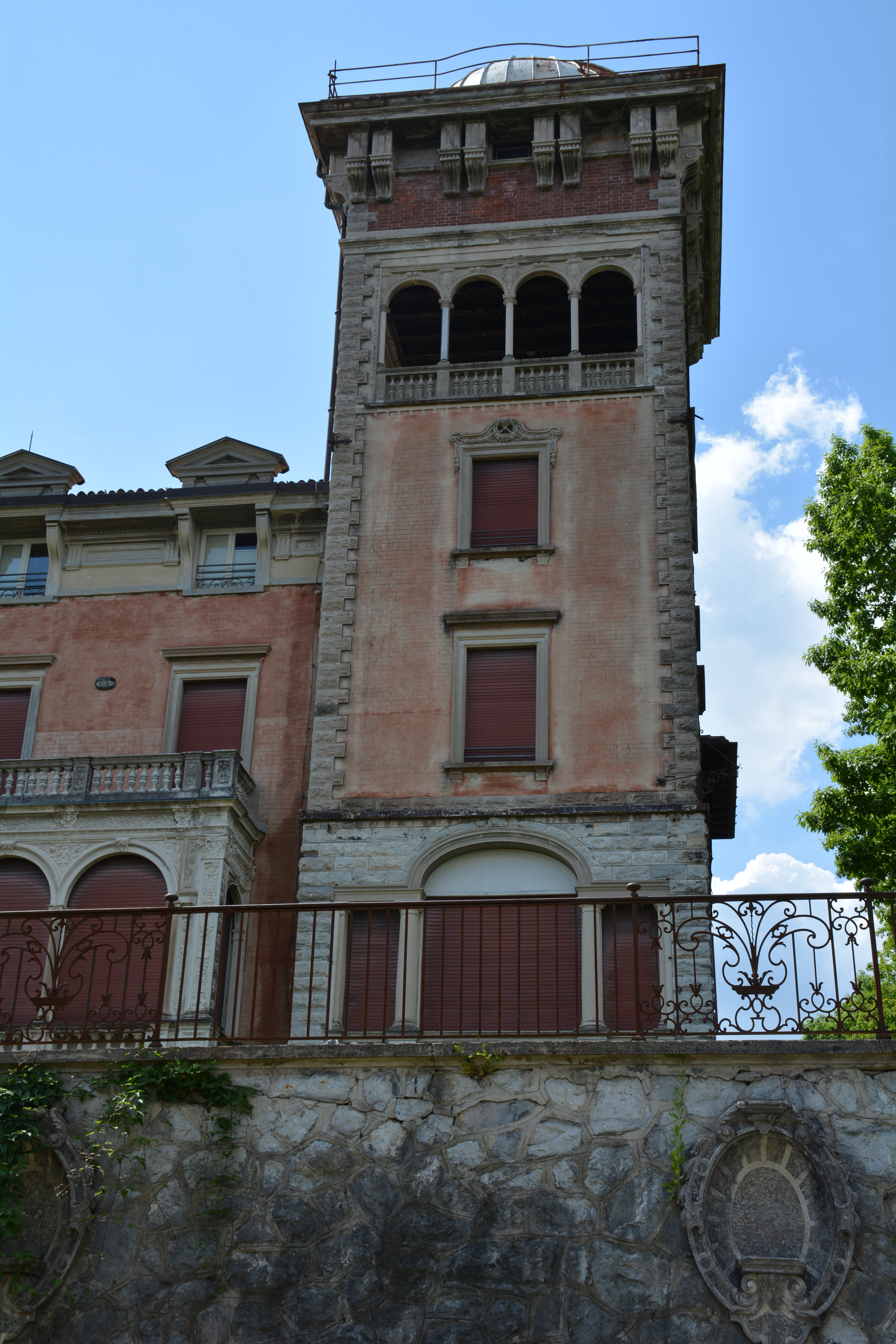
Villa Toeplitz, Tower and observatory

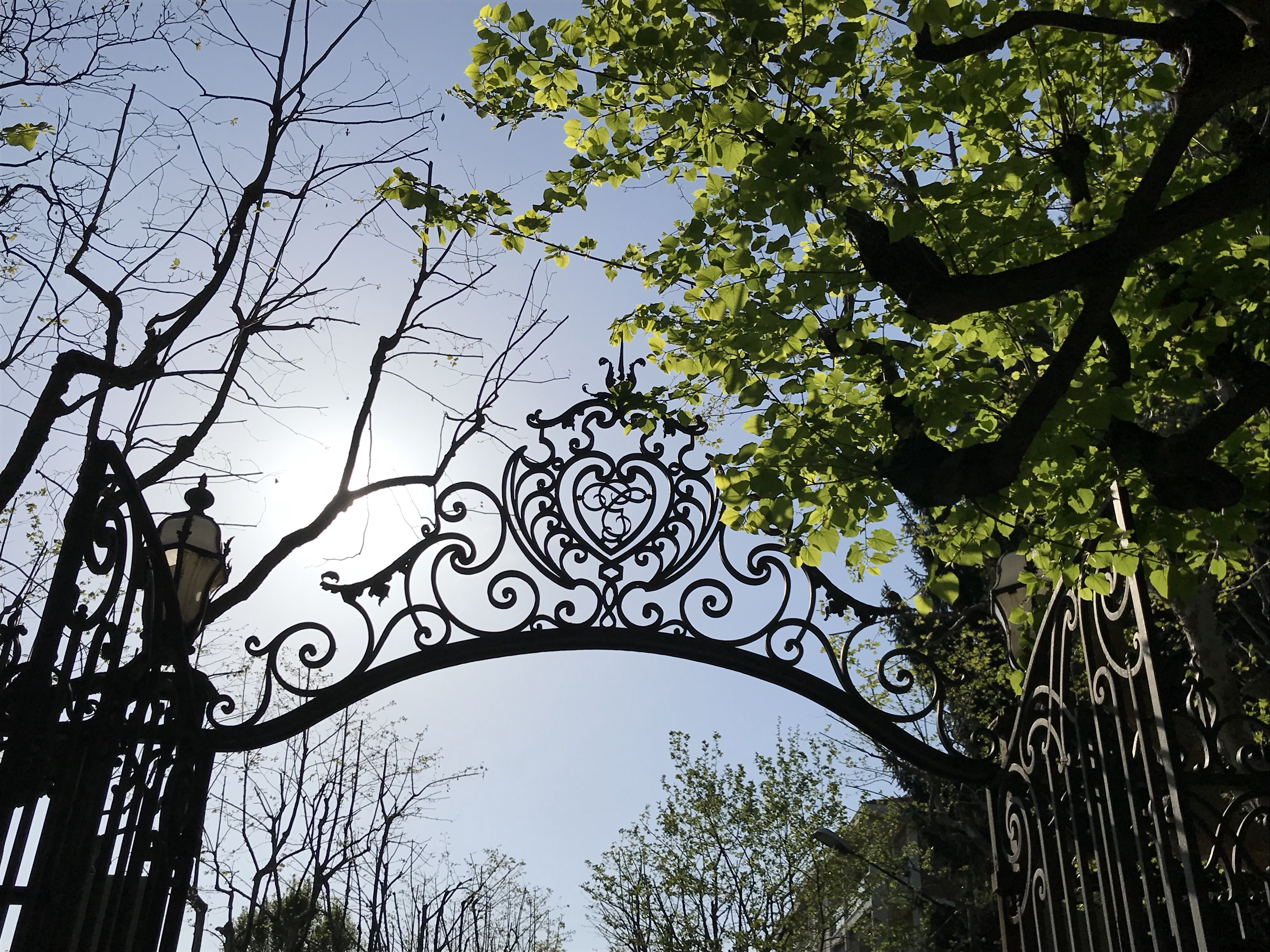
Villa Toeplitz, Front gate with monogram

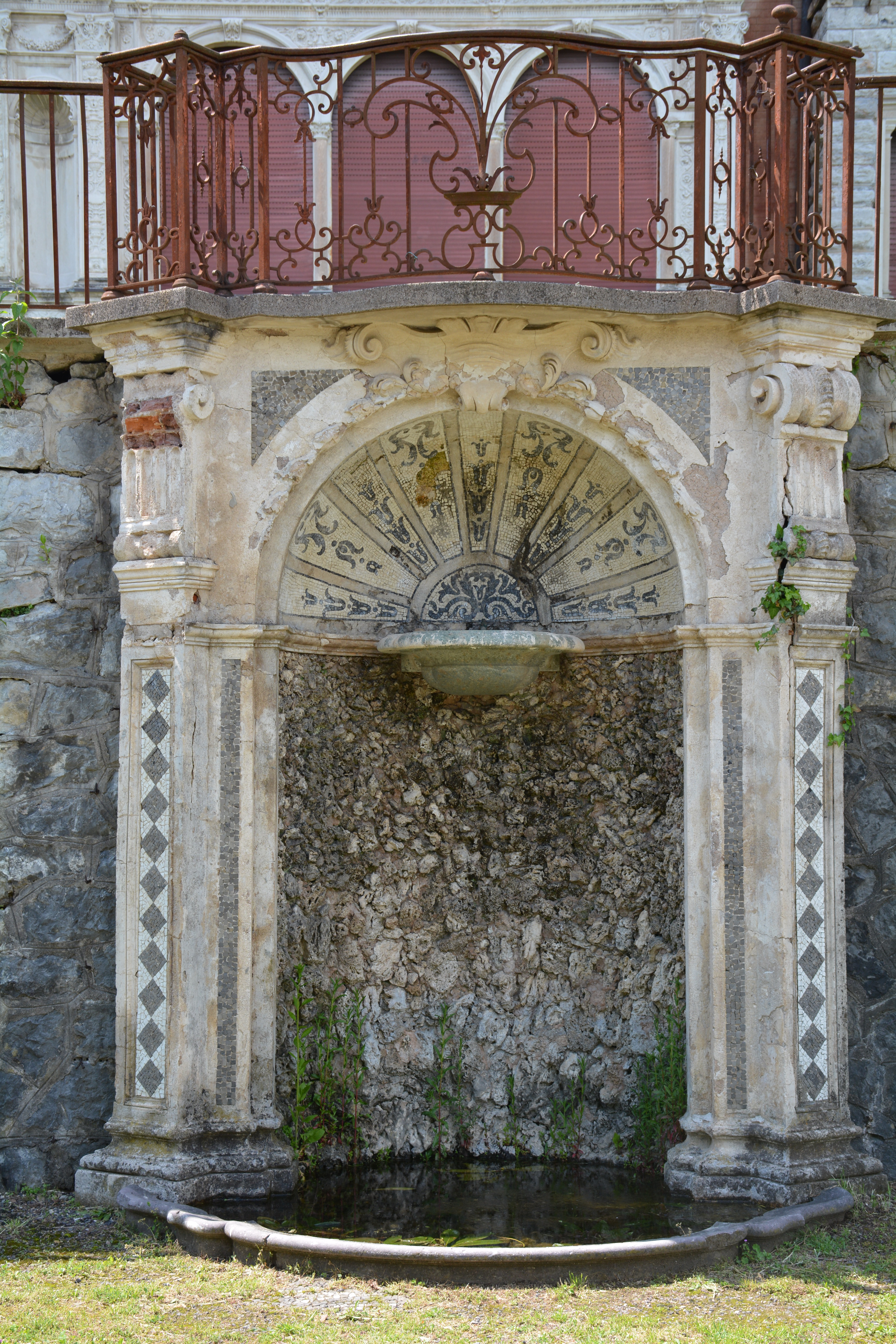
Villa Toeplitz, Fountain with ivy

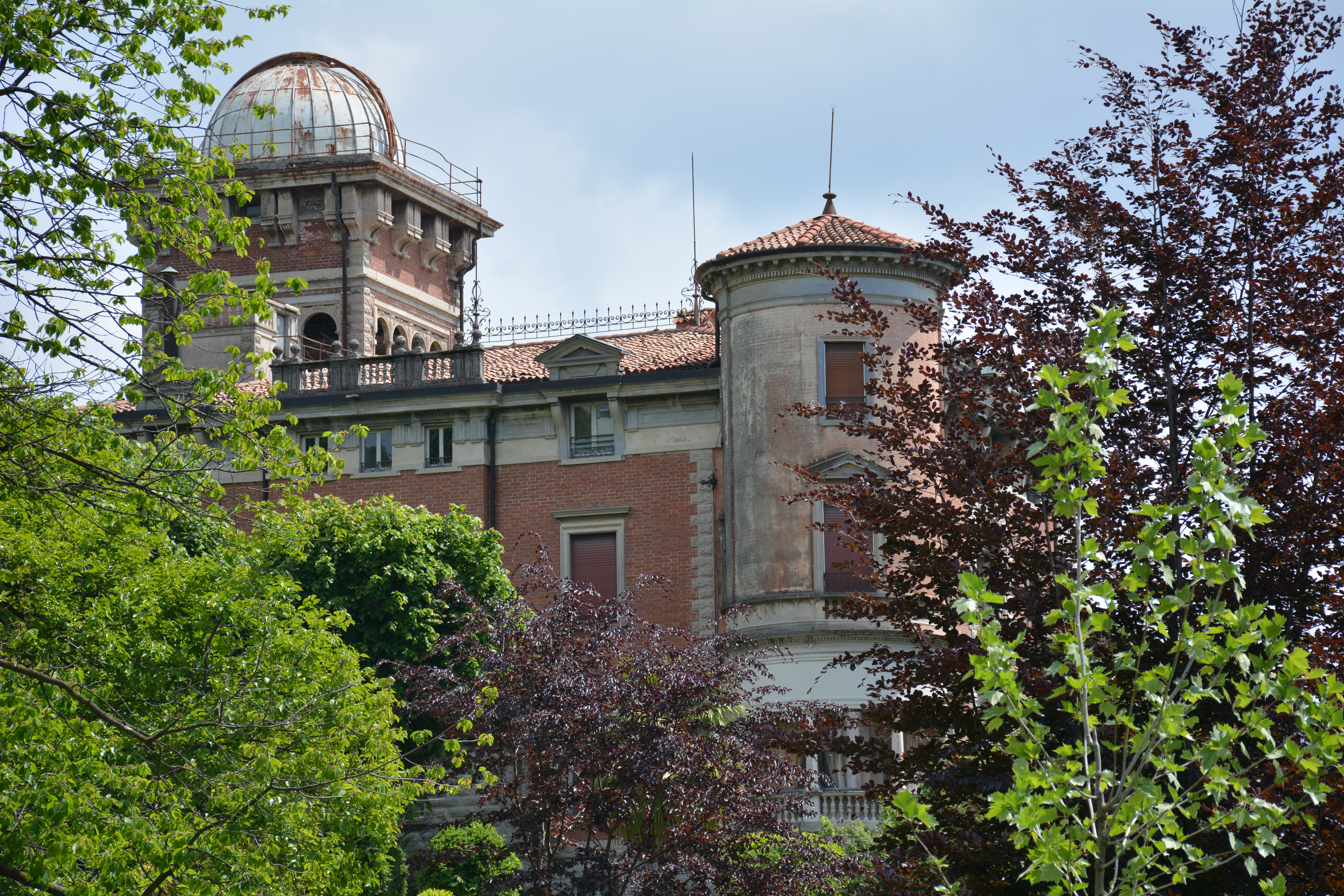
Villa Toeplitz, View from below

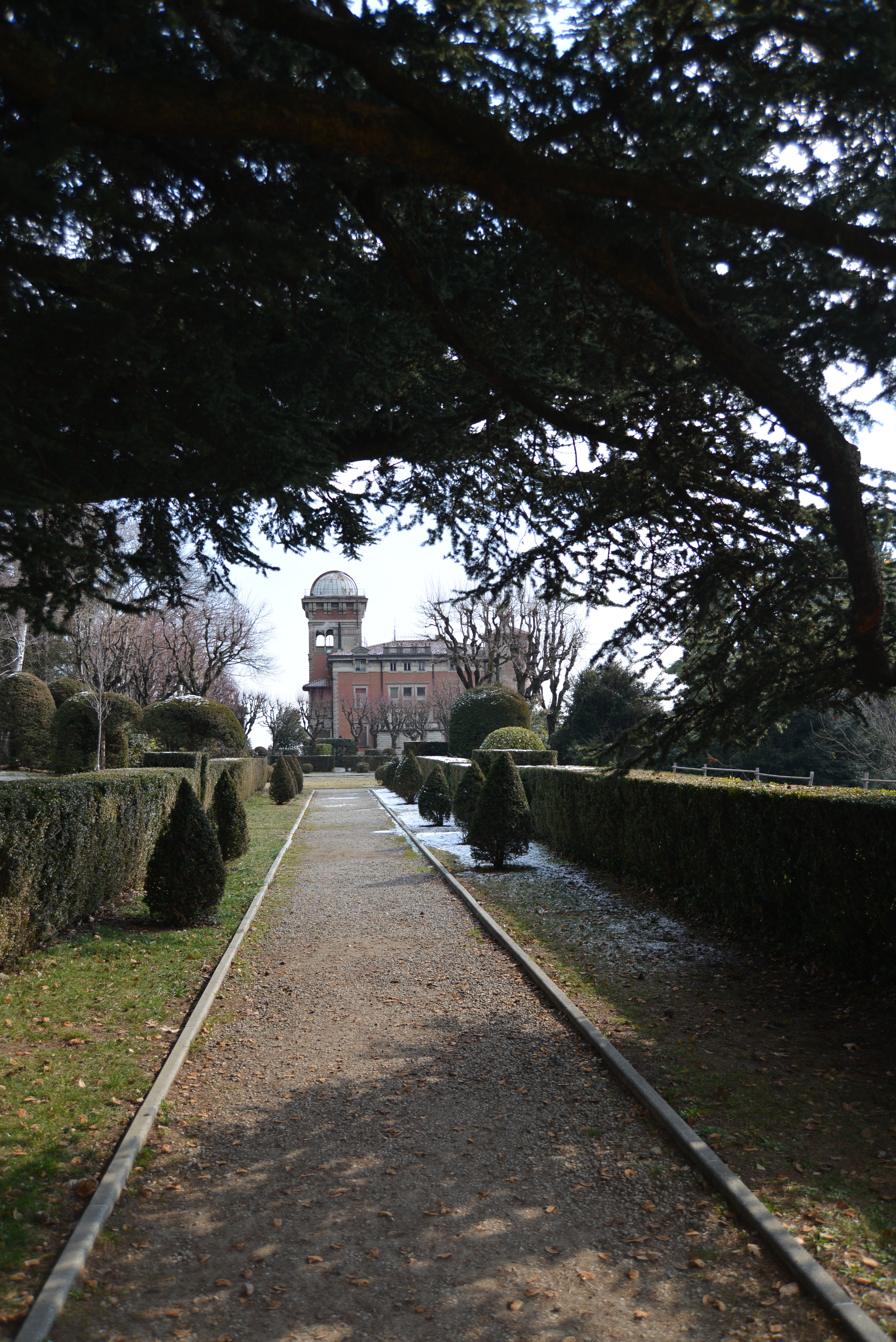
Villa Toeplitz, Parterre Walkway

== Bibliography ==
Publications about Villa Toeplitz:

- Edvige Toeplitz Mrozowska, Visioni Orientali, 1930
- Ludovico Toeplitz, Il Banchiere, 1963
- P. Cottini, Ville suburbane, residenze di campagna e territorio: esempi in Lombardia ed Emilia Romagna, 1989
- Marco Castiglioni, Museo Castigioni. Guida, 2015
- Various authors, Itinerari del Novecento. Architettura a Varese e provincia tra le due guerre, 2018
- G. Pacciarotti, Storia dell'arte a Varese e nel suo territorio, L'eclettismo nel territorio di Varese, 2011
- Santino Langé, Flaviano Vitali, Ville della provincia di Varese, 1984

== See also ==
- Banca Commerciale Italiana
- University of Insubria
- Varese
- Astronomical Observatory
- Lombardy
- Campo dei Fiori
- Giardino all'italiana
