= Varese =

Varese Varés (Lombard)
- Comune
- Città di Varese
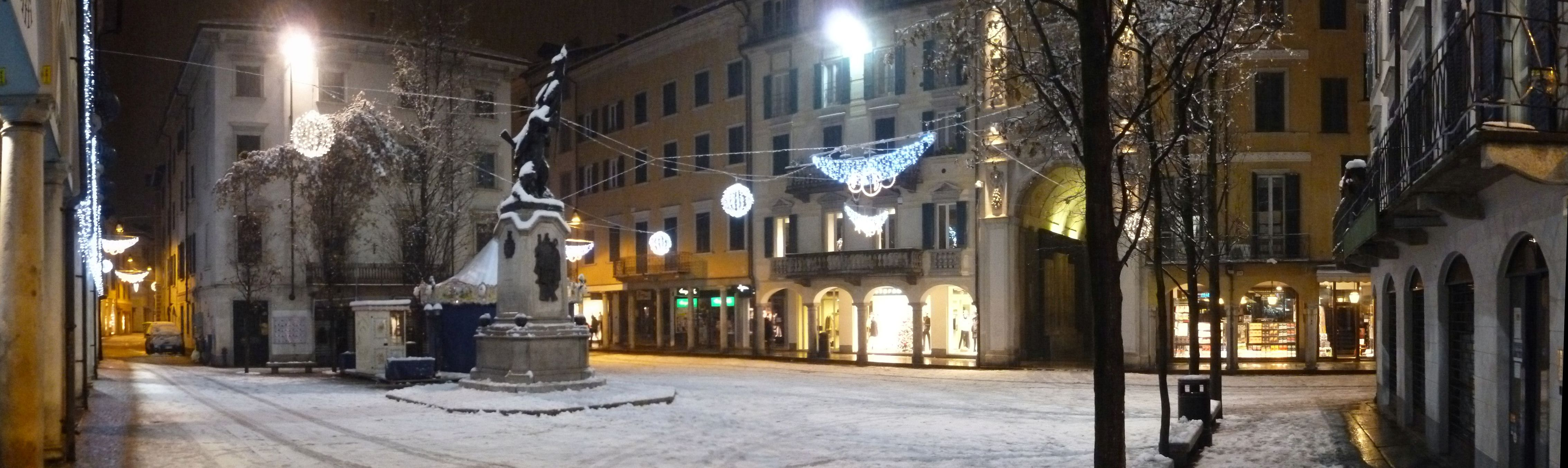
- The Piazza del Podestà

- Flag Coat of arms

- Location within Italy Location within Lombardy
- Coordinates: 45°49′N 08°50′E
- Country: Italy
- Region: Lombardy
- Province: Varese (VA)
- Frazioni: Avigno, Belforte, Biumo Inferiore, Biumo Superiore, Bizzozero, Bobbiate, Bosto, Bregazzana, Bustecche, Calcinate degli Orrigoni, Calcinate del Pesce, Campo dei Fiori, Capolago, Cartabbia, Casa Bassa, Casbeno, Cascina Gualtino, Cascina Mentasti, Caverzasio, Fogliaro, Gaggio, Giubiano, Lissago, Masnago, Mirasole, Mustonate, Oronco, Prima Cappella, Rasa di Varese, San Fermo, Sangallo, Santa Maria del Monte, Sant'Ambrogio, Schiranna, Ungheria, Velate

Government
  - Mayor: Davide Galimberti (PD)

Area
  - Total: 54 km^{2} (21 sq mi)
- Elevation: 382 m (1,253 ft)

Population (28 February 2017)
  - Total: 80,588
  - Density: 1,500/km^{2} (3,900/sq mi)
- Demonym: Varesini
- Time zone: UTC+1 (CET)
  - Summer (DST): UTC+2 (CEST)
- Postal code: 21100
- Dialing code: 0332
- Patron saint: San Vittore
- Saint day: 8 May
- Website: Official website

Varese (UK: /vəˈreɪzeɪ, -zi/ və-RAY-zay, -zee, US: /vɑːˈreɪseɪ/ var-AY-say; Italian: [vaˈreːze] or [vaˈreːse]; Varesino: Varés [ʋaˈreːs]; Latin: Baretium; archaic German: Väris) is a city and comune in north-western Lombardy, northern Italy, 55 km (34 mi) north-west of Milan. It is the capital of the Province of Varese. The hinterland or exurban part of the city is called Varesotto.

On 1 January 2025, the province of Varese counted 881,907 inhabitants, while the city itself counted 79,226 inhabitants.

== Geography ==
The city of Varese lies at the foot of Sacro Monte di Varese, part of the Campo dei Fiori mountain range, which hosts an astronomical observatory, as well as the Prealpino Geophysical Centre. The village, which is in the middle of the mountain, is called Santa Maria del Monte because of the medieval sanctuary, which is reached through the avenue of the chapels of the Sacred Mountain. Varese is situated on seven hills: the San Pedrino Hill, the Giubiano Hill, the Campigli Hill, the Sant'Albino Hill, the Biumo Superiore Hill, Colle di Montalbano (Villa Mirabello) and the Hill of Miogni. The city also looks over Lake Varese.

== Climate ==
Varese's winters are not significantly affected by the proximity of Lago Maggiore and the minor lakes surrounding it. In late autumn and winter, temperatures frequently fall below zero Celsius, even if just by a few degrees. This differentiates it from areas south of the city. As in other cities in the foothills of Lombardy, fog is an infrequent phenomenon. Varese is on average cooler than other cities of the Lombard Prealps, especially in winter. Varese is one of the rainiest cities in Italy, with an annual precipitation average of more than 1,500 millimetres (59 in). Since the 1980s, snow has fallen less frequently, with the annual average going from 69 cm in 1967–1987 to 33 cm in 1988–2017.

Climate data for Varese, 1991-2020 (precipitation only)
Month	Jan	Feb	Mar	Apr	May	Jun	Jul	Aug	Sep	Oct	Nov	Dec	Year
Average precipitation mm	74.0	66.8	85.7	151.6	175.2	149.0	119.2	133.4	147.0	161.1	204.5	92.6	1,560.1
Average precipitation inches	2.91	2.63	3.37	5.97	6.90	5.87	4.69	5.25	5.79	6.34	8.05	3.65	61.42
Average precipitation days (≥ 1 mm)	5.8	5.4	6.3	10	11.3	10	7.5	8.6	8.3	9.2	9.5	6.8	98.7
Source: Istituto Superiore per la Protezione e la Ricerca Ambientale

== Demographics ==
Historical population
Year	Pop.	±%
1861	11,954	—
1871	12,605	+5.4%
1881	14,161	+12.3%
1901	17,666	+24.8%
1911	20,754	+17.5%
1921	23,097	+11.3%
1931	41,889	+81.4%
1936	44,832	+7.0%
1951	53,115	+18.5%
1961	66,963	+26.1%
1971	83,239	+24.3%
1981	90,527	+8.8%
1991	85,687	−5.3%
2001	80,511	−6.0%
2011	79,793	−0.9%
2021	78,740	−1.3%
Source: ISTAT

The city of Varese, like the province, has a very high immigrant population owing to both its economy (many multinational companies and the EU's Joint Research Centre in nearby Ispra) and its location (proximity to Milan makes it an ideal place for the latter city's workers).

== History ==
This town has been known since the Early Middle Ages, when it became officially a municipality. The population by 1848 was about 4000.

In 1859, Giuseppe Garibaldi confronted Austrian forces led by Field Marshal-Lieutenant Carl Baron Urban near Varese. Also, it was here where Alessandro Marchetti's Savoia-Marchetti SM.93 made his first test flights.

In the 20th century, thanks to the increase in population and to the improvement of its economy, the dimensions of this urban centre rose. During the 20th century, its economy flourished quickly, mainly in manufacturing, in the mechanical and electromechanical industry and textile industry. Varese was well known for the footwear industry.

Symbols

The coat of arms of Varese

The coat of arms of the City of Varese dates back to around 1347. On the wooden cover of the double copy of the Burgi et Castellatiae de Varisio Statutes, preserved in the municipal archive, the oldest example of a civic coat of arms is depicted: "silver Samnite shield, with two corners of red, right and left on the head; all around closed by a black band". The effigy of San Vittore has no crown. It is probably in the sixteenth century - as the Varese historian Luigi Borri believes in his work Documenti Varesini of 1891 - that the shield was surmounted by the marquis crown and the effigy of St. Victor, patron saint of the city.

The coat of arms was recognized by decree of the head of the government of 17 June 1941, and the banner was granted with the royal decree of 28 April 1941.

== Transport ==
The road and rail infrastructure network that makes up the connection system of the city of Varese is powered by a lot of little streets and a double rail network, and by 74,000 high mobility vehicles. In particular, the major movements are incoming into Varese. In the average weekday over 113,000 vehicles enter Varese.

The most used form of transportation in Varese is the private vehicle, followed by the local public transport. The A8 motorway connects Varese with Milan. The city also has a Ring Road System: Varese's Ring Road consists of three roads currently in operation and one more under construction (North Ring Road). The currently operating roads of Varese's Ring Road System are the East Ring Road, a double lane road managed by ANAS; South Ring Road, a double lane highway managed by Autostrada Pedemontana Lombarda; North East Ring Road, a single lane road managed by ANAS.

Many important national and provincial roads pass through Varese.

The entire rail network serving the capital is electrified. The city is served by three railway stations:

- Varese FS, managed by Centostazioni and RFI SpA, Ferrovie Dello Stato Group: it is the first/last station of Suburban Line S5 of Milan Varese-Treviglio via Milan (operated by ATM-Trenord) and runs a high-frequency train to Milan and Porto Ceresio, toward Switzerland (operated by Trenord). In addition, Varese FS provides direct trains to Malpensa Airport, Como, Mendrisio and Lugano (Switzerland). - Varese Nord (in the city centre) and Varese Casbeno (in the neighbourhood of Casbeno), managed by FerrovieNord on Milan Cadorna-Saronno-Varese-Laveno line: train service is operated by Trenord.

The city has both an extensive city bus network (12 lines + 3 lines in the urban area) operated by Autolinee Varesine, and suburban bus services. International bus services are operated by Swiss Post Bus of line 523 that links Varese to Lugano and Mendrisio.

In Varese, there is also a funicular service on the Vellone-Sacro Monte funicular.

The nearest airfield is Varese-Venegono Airport (ICAO:LILN) located 10 km southeast of Varese. The nearest airport is Milan Malpensa Airport, which provides most domestic and international flights. It is located 35 km south of the city.

== Main sights ==
The city is home to the Sacro Monte di Varese ('the Sacred Mount of Varese'), a place of pilgrimage and worship. It is one of the Sacri Monti of Piedmont and Lombardy, included on the UNESCO World Heritage list.

=== Religious architecture ===
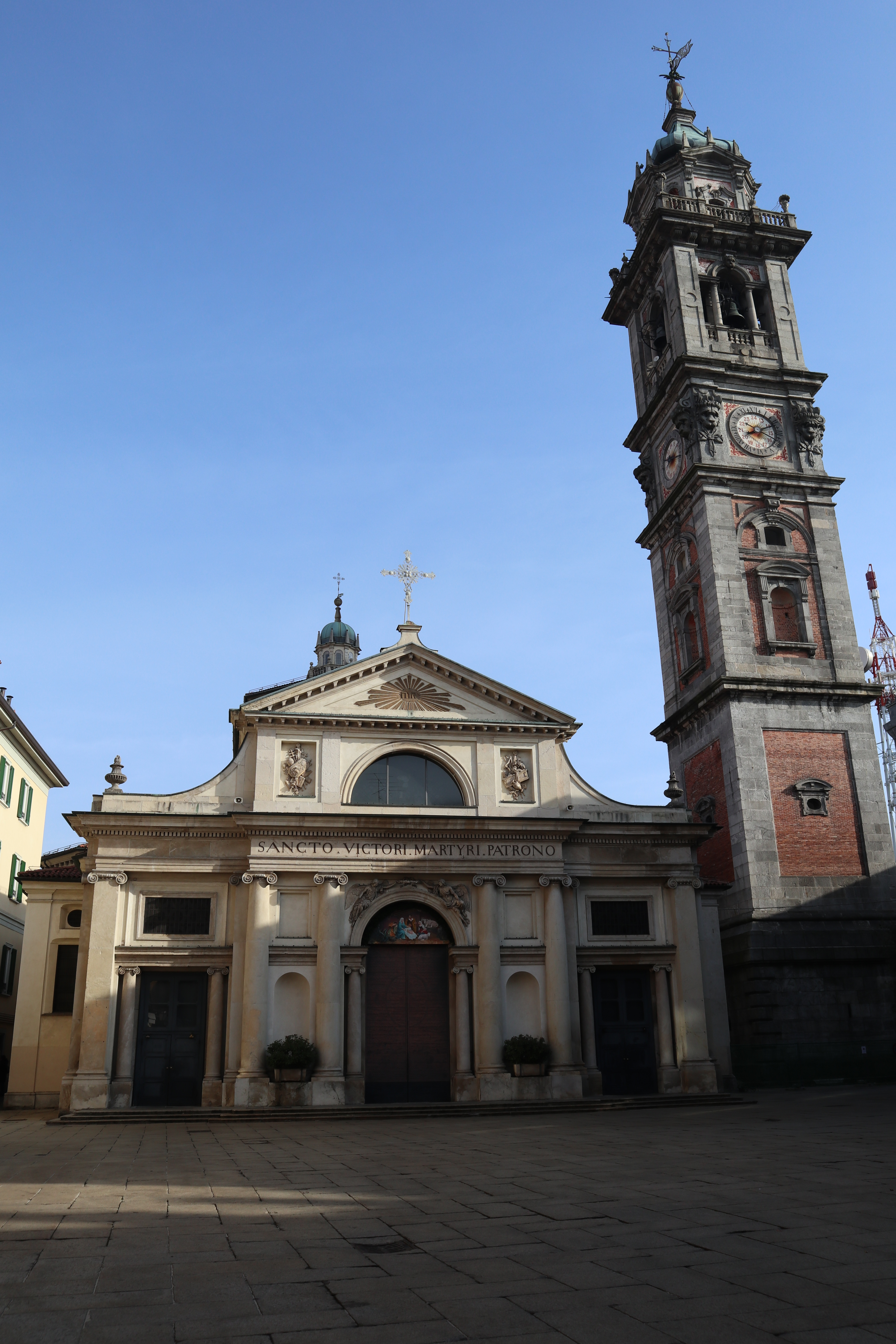
Basilica of Saint Victor, Varese

- Basilica of San Vittore (16th-17th century)
- Church of St. Martin (1774)
- Church of Sant'Antonio alla Motta (1606-1614)
- Church of St. Joseph (1504)
- Church of St. Charles Borromeo (1960-1961)

=== Civic buildings ===
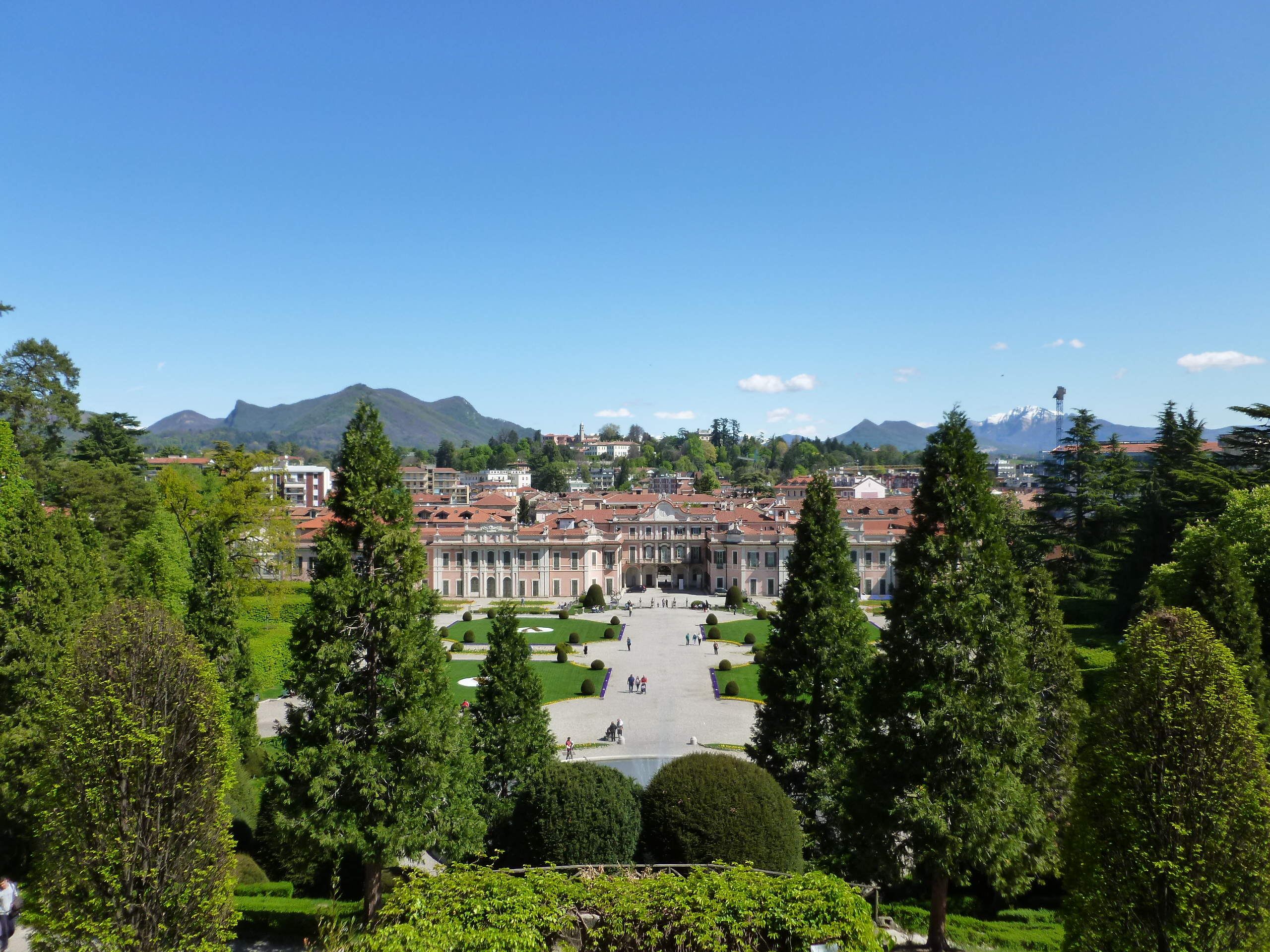
The Palazzo Estense, now used as the town hall of Varese

Varese is rich in castles, many of which once belonged to the Borromeo family. The historic centre of the city includes the Praetorian Palace and Villa Cagna, a residential complex that also hosts the Civic Music School of Varese.

After the 19th century, it was enriched by villas and their surrounding gardens, many now open to visitors, including:

- Villa Recalcati in Casbeno was built in the early 18th century, enlarged during 1756–77, and was once a luxury hotel. It now houses the offices of the Province of Varese and the Prefecture.
- Villa Mylius, near the town centre, was once owned by the Jesuit order, and in 1773 the house and park were sold to the notable Francesco Torelli, who transformed a modest building into a large villa, then sold it in 1902 to the industrialist George Mylius. After his death, the property was divided among several heirs, who in 1946 jointly sold it to the Varesino Achille Cattaneo, and he donated it to the town of Varese in 2007.
- Villa Toeplitz, in the Sant'Ambrogio district, stands in a large public park. The complex is named after Giuseppe Toeplitz (1866–1938), a Polish-born banker who bought it in 1914. Already a modest country residence of the German family Hannesen, was enlarged by Toeplitz after World War II, when his wife Hedwig Mrozowska and his son Louis sold it to the brothers Mocchetti of Legnano. The complex with the elegant Italian park was passed to the Municipality of Varese in 1972.
- Ville Ponti was built between 1850 and 1870 by Milanese architect Giuseppe Balzaretto (1801–1874) for Andrea Ponti. In 1976, it was converted into a convention centre. The main building, surrounded by a public park, is decorated internally by Giuseppe Bertini (1825–1898). Part of the complex, Villa Fabio Ponti, is a neoclassical-style villa housed in the 1959 headquarters for Garibaldi.
- Villa Menafoglio Litta Panza in locations Biumo Superiore, opposite the entrance of Ville Ponti, was commissioned in the mid-18th century by the Marquis Paolo Antonio Menafoglio, and is an example of a vacation home in Varese. The villa with the garden was partly transformed during the Napoleonic period (neoclassical hall) when the garden was converted into an English-style garden. Recognized since 1996 and protected by the FAI, the building currently hosts the contemporary art collection of the Panza family.
- Villa Augusta, in the Giubiano neighbourhood, was built in the second half of the 19th century. Already owned by Testoni, passed to the Hospital of Circolo di Varese and then, on 30 September 1952, was ceded to the Roman Catholic order of the Sisters of Helpers of Holy Souls who pray for souls in Purgatory. Since 1968, the villa was purchased by the city and houses municipal offices. The park has been open to the public since 5 April 1970.
- Villa Baragiola, in Masnago, has a well-visited park. On the north side, in the shadow of Mount Campo dei Fiori, in 1895, the lawyer Andrea Baragiola opened one of the first Italian racecourses, which extended to the area now occupied by the stadium "Franco Ossola" and its ample parking. The villa was renovated in the early thirties, and in the next decade, refurbished as a religious seminary. Passed to the Municipality of Varese in 2001, today it is a part of its offices, while the park is open to the public.
- Masnago Castle.

In the city centre, there is the Palazzo Estense with its gardens (built in the 17th century) and Villa Mirabello. Villa Mirabello, the seat of Museo Civico Archeologico (Civic Archaeological Museum), was built in the late 600s on top of the hill which carries its name. This site is surrounded by a park which is set close to the park of Palazzo Estense.

Some examples of Varese villas

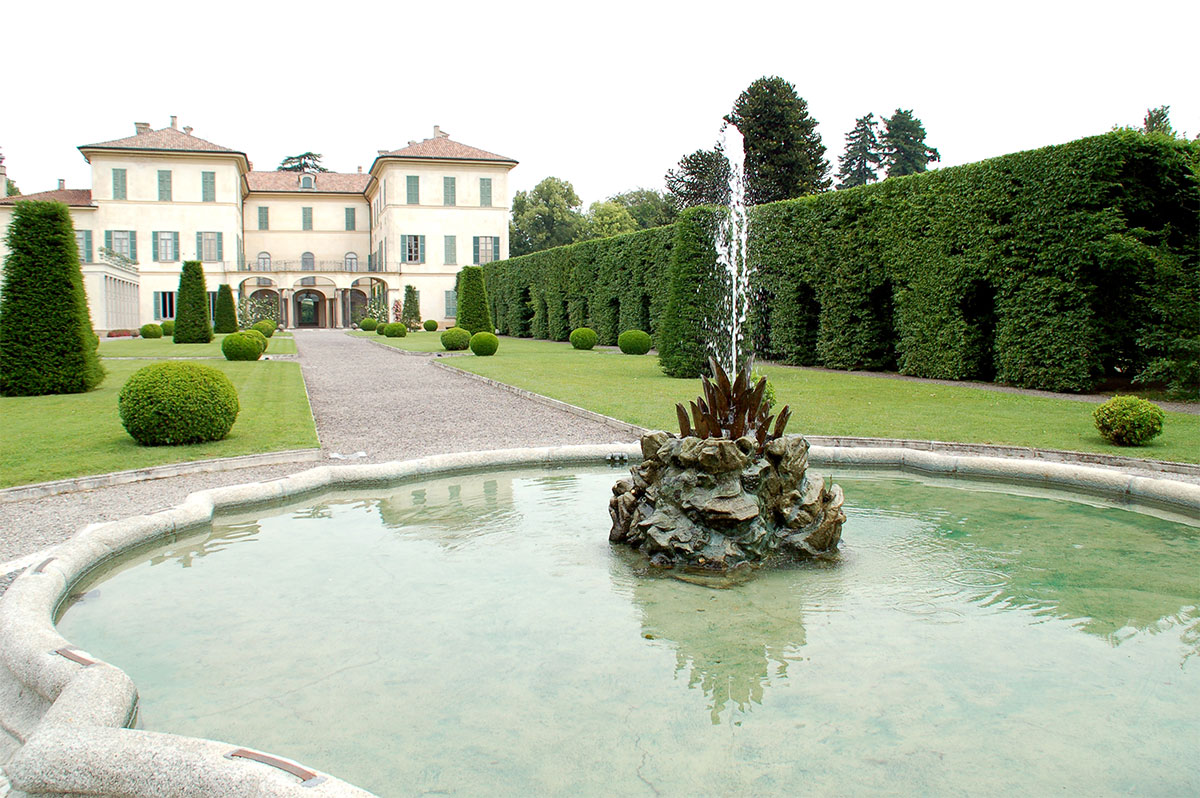

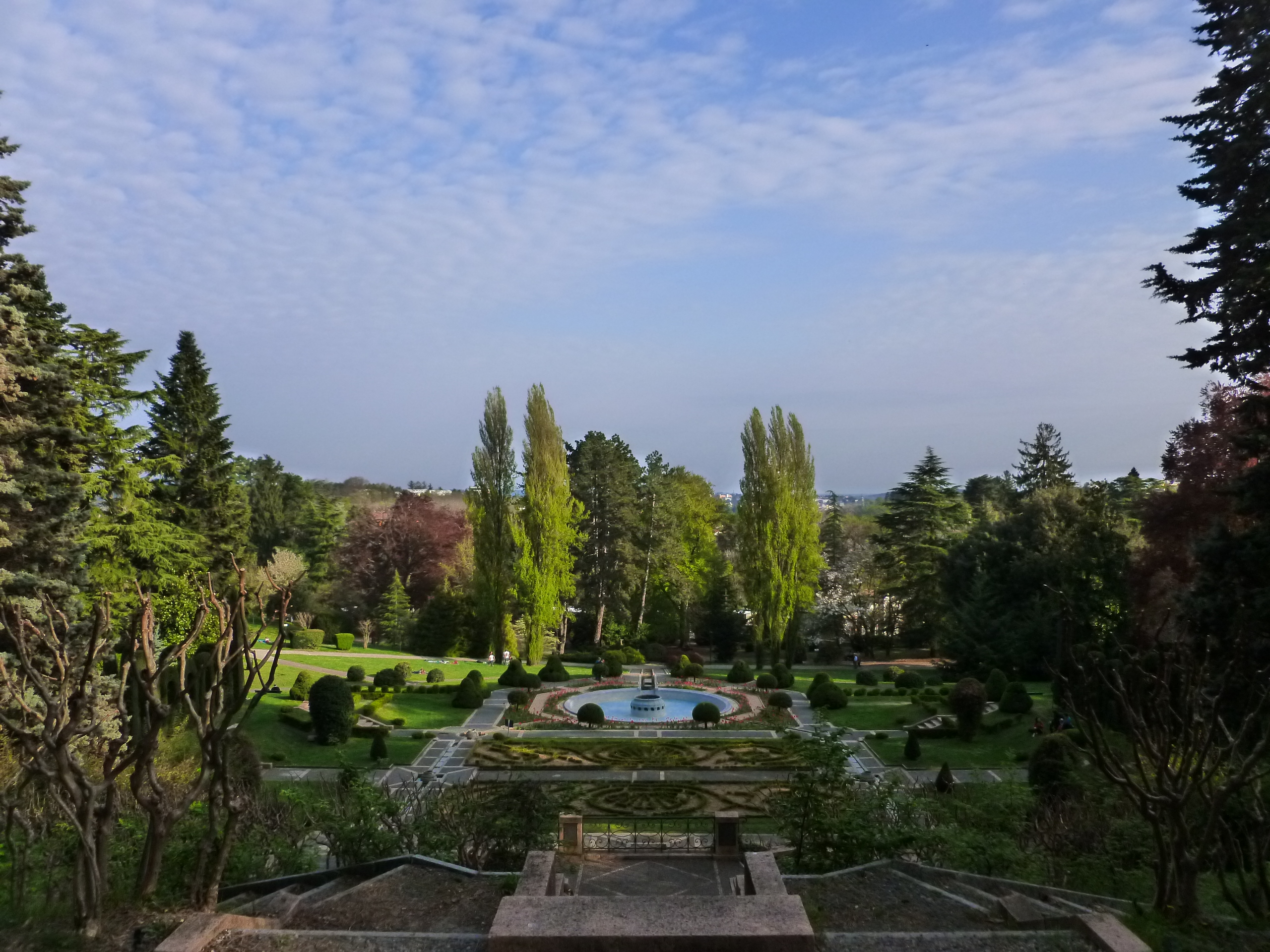

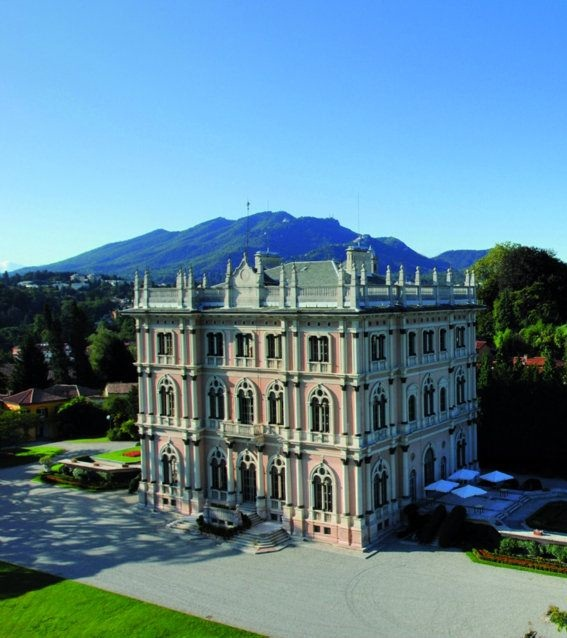

=== Natural areas ===
In addition to numerous public parks of the city, often appurtenances of historic villas, there is the Park Luigi Zanzi in Schiranna, established in the sixties through a partial filling of the coast of Lake Varese. It is a large botanical garden located on the banks of Lake Varese, rich in numerous species of trees and birdlife that is partially sheltered in the reeds along the banks. Bathing beach in the summer, the park also offers the possibility of peaceful walks and cycling on the bike path.

Close to the city of Varese is the Campo dei Fiori Regional Park, a natural reserve of over five thousand acres consisting of the massive mountain Campo dei Fiori and Mount Martica, separate from the valley Rasa, which is the junction of the Valcuvia and Olona valleys. Once, the peak of the Campo dei Fiori was characterized by extensive grassland, it became tourist destination of Varese and of Milan. Today, the blooms - which gave the name to the area are an attraction. It is a diverse place showing feature, related both to the natural environment and to history and culture, referring to history and tradition. There are small farming villages, monuments, cave systems and a network of trails: some passable on foot, on horseback and on bicycle. Inside the park, six nature reserves have been established, enclosing important and characteristic environments.

== Economy ==
The economy of Varese is mainly based on industry and, to a lesser extent, specialized agriculture; some famous Varese-based firms are:

- Aermacchi (military trainer aircraft)
- AgustaWestland (helicopters)
- Bticino (electrics)
- Cagiva, MV Agusta (motorbikes)
- Cobra Automotive Technologies (automotive)
- Vibram

Varese is close to Milan Malpensa Airport, which serves the international traffic of Milan, Italy.

== Education ==
Varese is home to a European School, the European School, Varese, which was established in 1960 for the children of European Union staff, who work mainly at one of the three institutes of the Joint Research Centre in nearby Ispra.

It is one of the two sites of the University of Insubria, located in the heart of the Garden City, and hosts in the newly built Campus Bizzozero the faculties of Medicine, Economics, Natural Sciences, etc.

== People ==
- Ferruccio Azzarini (1924–2005), footballer
- Flaminio Bertoni (1903–1964), a sculptor and industrial designer known especially for his work at Citroën where he designed the 2CV, the H van, the DS and the Ami 6
- Giulio Bizzozero (1846–1901), one of the pioneers of histography, and, more generally, the use of the microscope in medical research
- Luigi Boffi (1846-1904), architect
- Laura Bono (born 1979), singer and songwriter
- Umberto Bossi (1941-2026), politician; leader of the Lega Lombarda, and of the Lega Nord; Minister for Institutional Reforms and Devolution and Minister of Federal Reforms
- Lilli Carati (1956–2014), model and pornographic actress
- Emilio Dandolo (1830–1859), brother of Enrico, who also participated in several of the most important battles of the Risorgimento, including the Five Days of Milan uprising
- Enrico Dandolo (1827–1849), a figure of the Italian Risorgimento who participated in several of its most important battles and participated in the formation of the Roman Republic
- Attilio Fontana (born 1952), politician, president of Lombardy since 2018
- Angelo Frattini (1910–75), sculptor
- Gennaro Gattuso (born 1978), professional football player
- Roberto Gervasini (born 1947), athletic champion runner
- Federico Leo (born 1988), racing driver
- Laura Macchi (born 1979), basketball player whose career began at Pallacanestro Varese
- Pietro Antonio Magatti (1691–1767), a painter active in Lombardy in a late-Baroque (barocchetto) style
- Roberto Maroni (1955–2022), Italian politician of Lega Nord
- Calogero Marrone (1889–1945), Righteous Among the Nations
- Stefano Marzano (born 1950), industrial designer, Chief Design Officer of Electrolux
- Andrea Meneghin (born 1974), basketball player and coach with Pallacanestro Varese
- Dino Meneghin (born 1950), professional basketball player for Ignis Varese
- Ottavio Missoni, designer and founder of the Italian fashion house Missoni which is also based in Varese
- Mario Monti (born 1943), economist and politician
- Emilio Morosini (1830–1849), participant in the Risorgimento
- Bob Morse, in 2009, in recognition of his contributions on and off the basketball court, the City Council of Varese, Italy, made Robert Duncan "Bob" Morse an honorary citizen of the city
- Attilio Nicora (1937–2017), cardinal of the Roman Catholic Church and Emeritus Bishop of Verona
- Aldo Ossola (born 1945), a basketball player
- Franco Ossola (1921–1949), a member of the Torino F.C. squad who died in the Superga air disaster; Stadio Franco Ossola, the stadium of A.S. Varese 1910, is named in his honour
- Roberto Plano (born 1978), pianist
- Renato Pozzetto (born 1940), actor, director and cabaret artist and one of the best-loved figures of Italian comedy in recent years
- Flavio Premoli (born 1949), musician and composer
- Lia Quartapelle (born 1982), politician
- Alessio Rovera (born 1995), racing driver
- Corsi Sandro, 2013 Fellow of the Institute of Electrical and Electronics Engineers
- Francesco Tamagno (1850–1905), an operatic tenor and the creator of the role of Verdi's Otello, who lived at Varese and died at his villa there, aged 54
- Carlo Maria Viganò (born 1941), Archbishop and Apostolic Nuncio to the United States, 2011 to 2016
- Giuseppe Zamberletti (1933–2019), Italian politician recognised as the founding father of the modern Italian Department of Civil Protection

=== Cycling ===
Varese has had a long and strong tradition of competitive cycling. It hosted the 1951 and 2008 World Road Cycling Championships.

One of the biggest events is the yearly Tre Valli Varesine, which usually takes place at the end of September, beginning of October. Is a race that goes through the three Varesian valleys: the Valganna, Valcuvia and Valceresio.

Varese has been home to numerous cyclists, including:

- Ivan Basso (born 1977), winner of the 2006 and 2010 Giro d'Italia
- Alfredo Binda (1902–1986), a cyclist of the 1920s and 1930s, later trainer of Fausto Coppi and Gino Bartali
- Gianni Bugno (born 1964)
- Noemi Cantele (born 1981)
- Valentina Carretta (born 1989)
- Claudio Chiappucci (born 1963)
- Gabriele Colombo (born 1972)
- Davide Frattini (born 1978)
- Francesco Frattini (born 1967)
- Óscar Freire (born 1976), Spanish cyclist
- Stefano Garzelli (born 1973), overall winner of the 2000 Giro d'Italia
- Paride Grillo (born 1982)
- Daniele Nardello (born 1972)
- Andrea Peron (born 1971), cyclist
- Michael Rogers (born 1979), Australian cyclist
- Filippo Turconi (born 2005)
- Charly Wegelius (born 1978), British cyclist
- Cameron Wurf (born 1983), ex-Australian Olympic rower and professional cyclist
- Stefano Zanini (born 1969)

== Music festivals ==
- Open Jazz Varese
- Ghost Day Festival
- Solevoci Vocal Festival (a cappella, choral, gospel, etc.)

== Sport ==
Varese is known for the basketball team Pallacanestro Varese, which played 10 FIBA European Champions Cup finals in a row between 1970 and 1979, winning five titles. Two UCI Road World Championships were held in Varese, in 1951 and 2008.

Other sports teams based in Varese include:

- SSD Varese Calcio (football)
- ASD Città di Varese (football)
- HC Varese (ice hockey)

== International relations ==
Varese is twinned with:

- Alba Iulia, Romania
- Romans-sur-Isère, France
