= Velate =

Frazione of Varese, Italy

Coordinates: 45.8457°N 8.7916°E

Velate (Velaa in the Varesino dialect) is a frazione of Varese located to the north of the city centre. Velate is situated along the base of the Campo dei Fiori mountain.

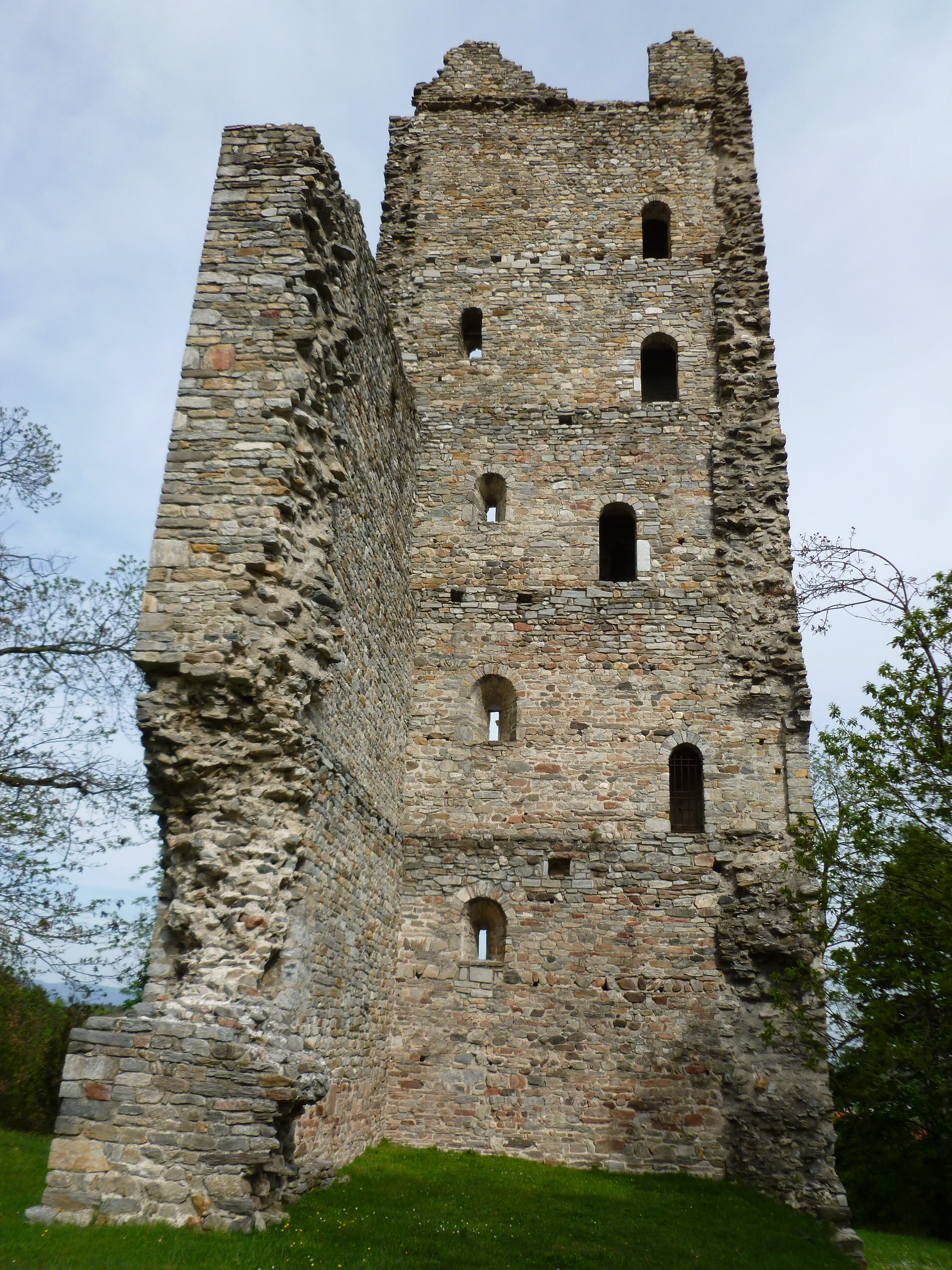
The Tower of Velate

== History ==
The town dates back to the early medieval period due to the presence of several fortifications and towers. The name "Velate" can be attested since the 12th century. Velate was an independent comune until 1927, when the fascist government decided to annex it to Varese, so that the population of the town would increase. In 1751, the population of the town was roughly 316, and in 1786 Velate and nearby Fogliaro joined the Province of Varese, to then leave and rejoin in the years 1791, 1798, and 1799. With the founding of the Napoleonic Kingdom of Italy in 1805, the town was registered to have a population of 630 people. In 1809, following a decree by Napoleon, Velate increased in size and annexed the nearby Santa Maria del Monte and Sant’Ambrogio Olona. The new comune was granted permission to create a Communal Council, and in 1853, Velate had a population of 1137 people. By 1871, the population had increased to 1247 and by the time it was annexed by Varese, Velate had a population of 2450 people.

== Monuments ==
=== Religious Architecture ===
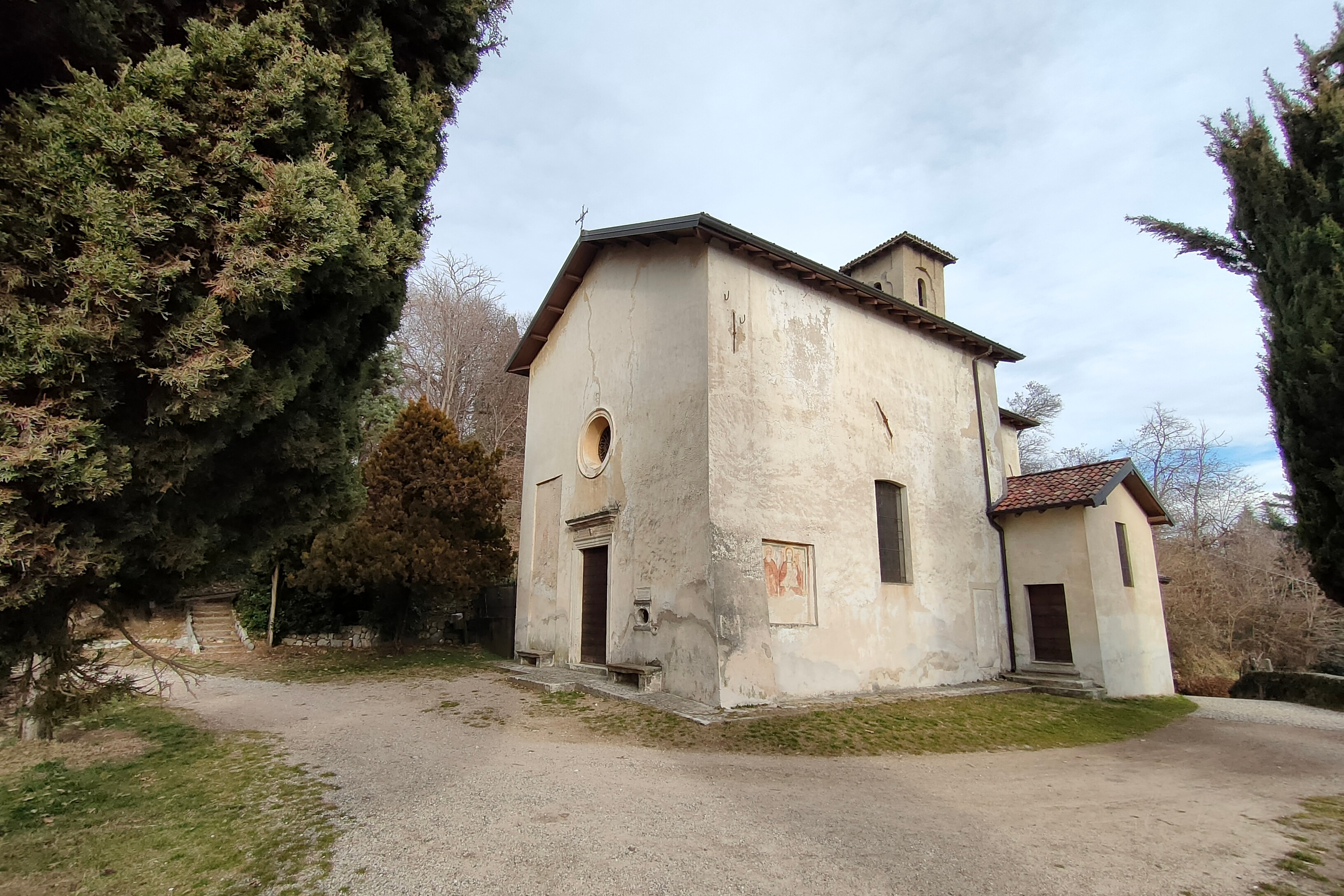
The Church of Saints Cassiano and Ippolito

- The church of Saints Cassiano and Ippolito: One of the oldest churches in Varese, and the oldest in Velate, the church was constructed in the 10th century.
- The Church of Santo Stefano and the Oratory of San Domenico: The original structure dates back to 1190, but has since been reconstructed numerous times. The façade was built in 1887. The church has a rectangular structure and 8 chapels separated by a central nave. The church is decorated with several frescoes which date back to the 15th century. The oratory is located next to the church and is now a baptistery.
- Convent of San Francesco in Pertica: Located on the Campo dei Fiori mountain, the convent was first mentioned in a document from 1228. The convent was visited by Charles Borromeo in 1574 during his pastoral visit to Varese. After the visit, the convent was gradually abandoned, and now only the ruined structure remains.

=== Civil Architecture ===
- The Tower of Velate: The Velate Tower is a medieval watchtower built between the 10th and 11th centuries. It is now in a state of ruin.

== Notable Residents ==
- Bernardino Castelli (1646–1725), Italian sculptor.
- Guido da Velate (died 1071), Italian Catholic priest, Archbishop of Milan from 1045 to 1071.
