= Parco Luigi Zanzi =

Park in Varese, Italy

- Interactive map of Parco Luigi Zanzi
- Type: urban park
- Location: Schiranna
- Nearest city: Varese
- Coordinates: 45.8018°N 8.7838°E
- Area: 60,000 square metres (650,000 ft^{2})
- Hiking trails: yes
- Parking: yes
- Public transit: Schiranna (Dei Prati) - line N

The Park Luigi Zanzi is an urban park of Varese, in Italy, located in the neighbourhood of Schiranna, on the shore of Lake Varese.

== History ==
The park was created in the 1960s for the work of the Autonomous Living of Varese, whose president was Luigi Zanzi. Just at the behest of the latter, the park was created by reclaiming the area. His successor, Giulio Nidoli, enhanced and improved it in 1970, the year in which it is purchased by the city of Varese.

== The park today ==
The Park is the home of Varese Rowing. In 2012 it hosted the European Championships of Rowing and in 2014 hosted the World Rowing U23 Championships.
