= Palazzo Estense =

Palace in Varese, Italy

Coordinates: 45.8185°N 8.8240°E

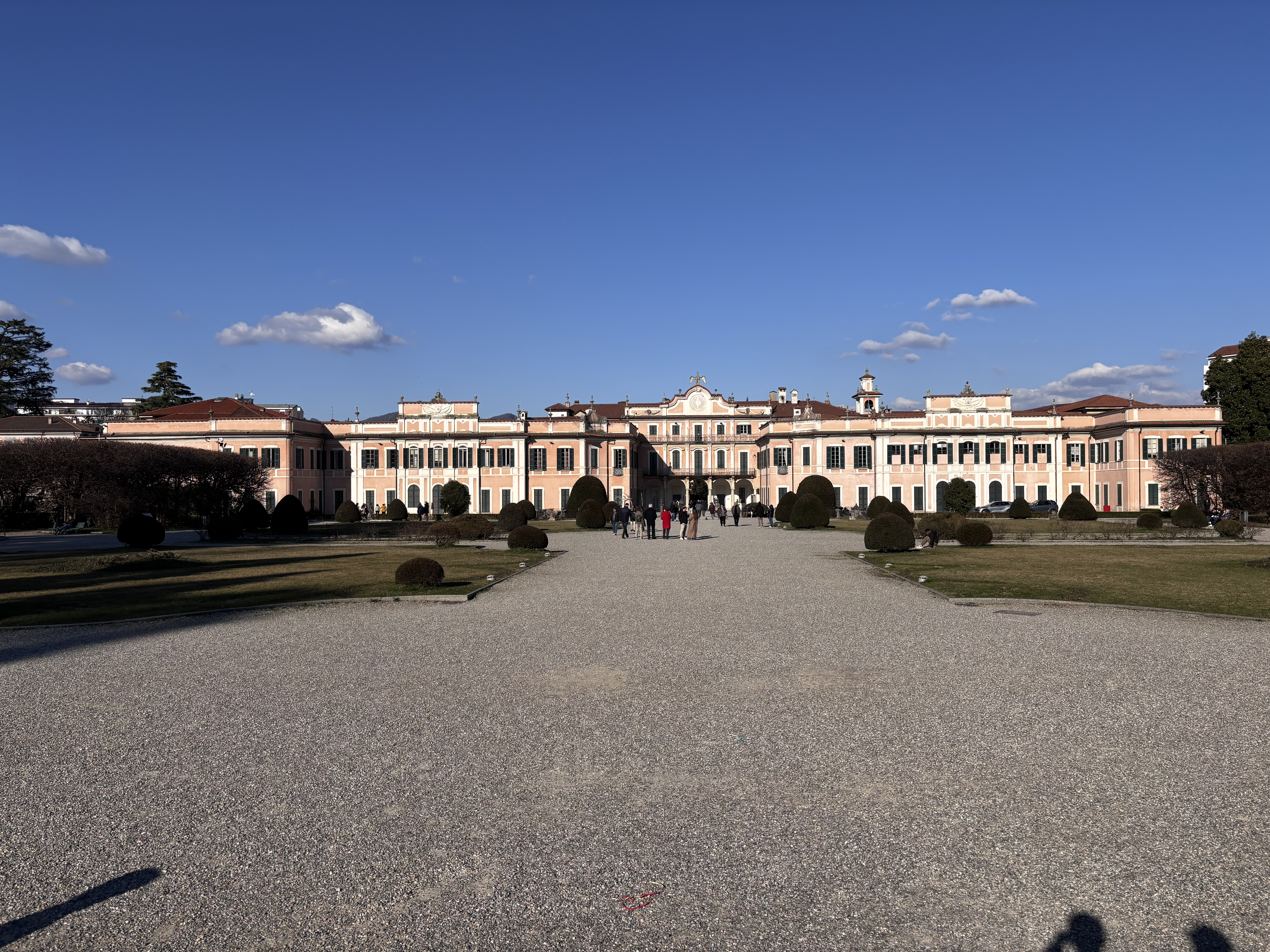
Palazzo Estense in 2025

The Palazzo Estense is a Baroque palace built for Francesco III d'Este and the House of Este in Varese, Italy.

The palace was designed by architect Giuseppe Bianchi and was completed in 1760. It became the home, by purchase in 1765, of Francesco III d'Este, Duke of Modena and interim Austrian governor of Lombardy, who was also invested in that year with the non-hereditary lordship of Varese, a fief specially established for him by the Empress Maria Theresa.

Today, the palace houses the civic administration of the local municipal council and hosts conferences and concerts. In May 2010 it hosted a meeting of G6 Interior Ministers.

== See also ==
- Ducal Palace of Rivalta
- Castello Estense in Ferrara, Italy
- Palazzo Schifanoia build for the Este, also in Ferrara, Italy
- List of Baroque residences
- Villa Toeplitz
