= Zanzi =

Zanzi is an Italian surname. Notable people with the surname include:

- Ernesto Zanzi (1904–?), Italian cyclist
- Italo Zanzi (born 1974), American sports business executive and attorney

Other uses

- A word used to describe the Chinese hairpin
