= Villa Baragiola =

Coordinates: 45.8304°N 8.7985°E

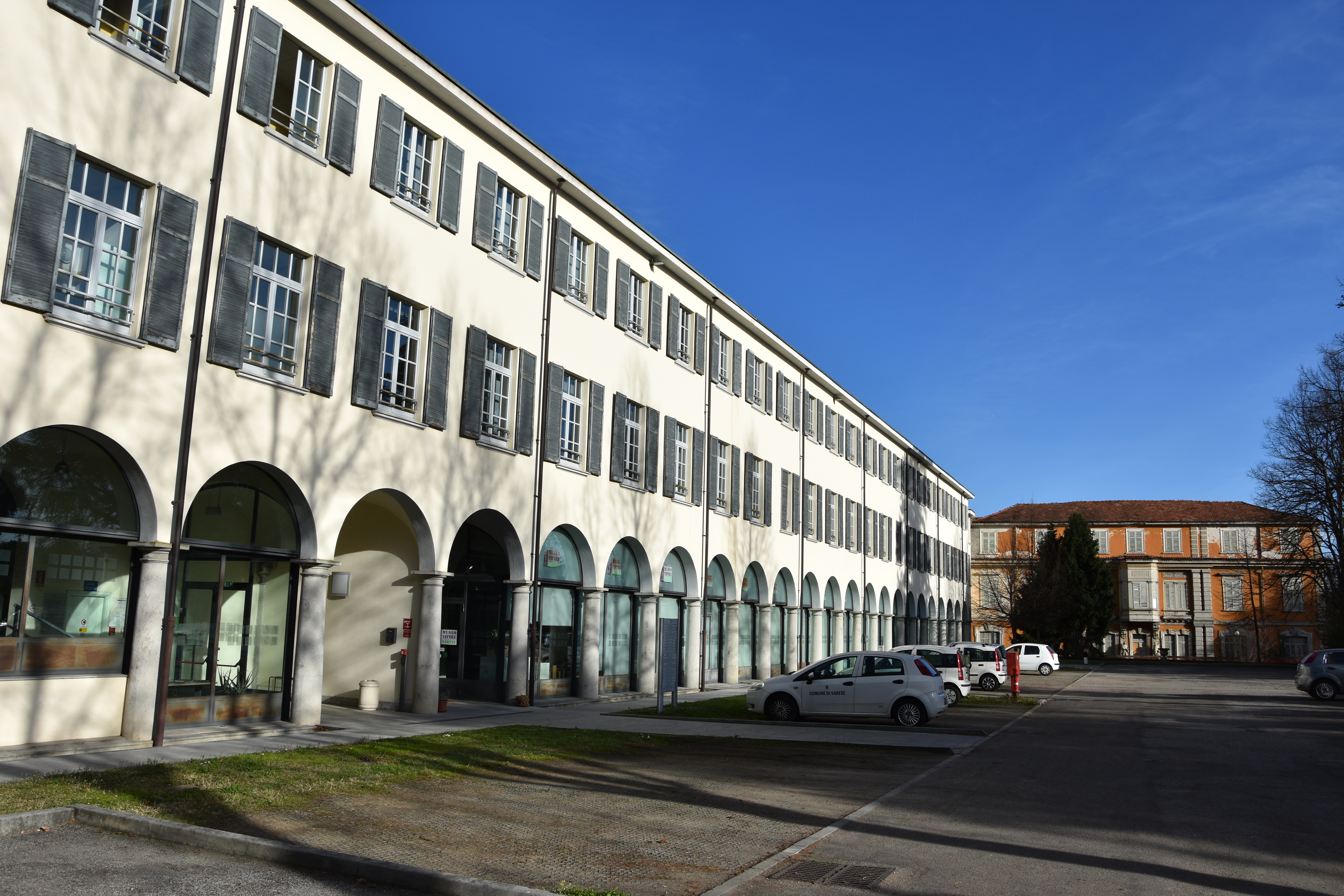

General information
- Country: Italy

Villa Baragiola, also known as Villa Baragiola Tedeschi or Villa Emma, is an eclectic-style villa in Masnago, near Varese, Italy, built by the Como nobleman Andrea Baragiola De Bustelli with the name Villa Emma in homage to his wife Emma Ronzini.

== History ==
The villa was built by Andrea Baragiola De Bustelli, known for the construction of the nearby hippodrome, starting from 1892, on properties belonging to the Baragiola De Bustelli family, transforming the rustic buildings into a manor house and the agricultural land into a landscaped park. The building had a square plan, with the stairwell in the centre around which various rooms were arranged: library, armoury, the hall of honour, illuminated by a large glass window overlooking a vast park.

During the twentieth century, the villa first became the property of the banker Giacomo Tedeschi and was subsequently transformed into the city's archiepiscopal seminary until 1991. Further modifications to the building date back to this period, such as the construction of an additional storey. In 1951, a long rectangular building was built, which housed the seminarians' classrooms.

In 1932, Tedeschi built the Hungarian dacha, a wooden chalet that stands on the hill in the centre of the park. The vast English park, characterised by botanical rarities, berceaux, curved and sinuous avenues with a long perspective staircase on the late Renaissance model of Villa Cicogna in Bisuschio, and an artificial lake that can also be explored by boat, was completely distorted following its conversion into a seminary. Today, it is open to the public. Noteworthy within it is the giant sequoia.

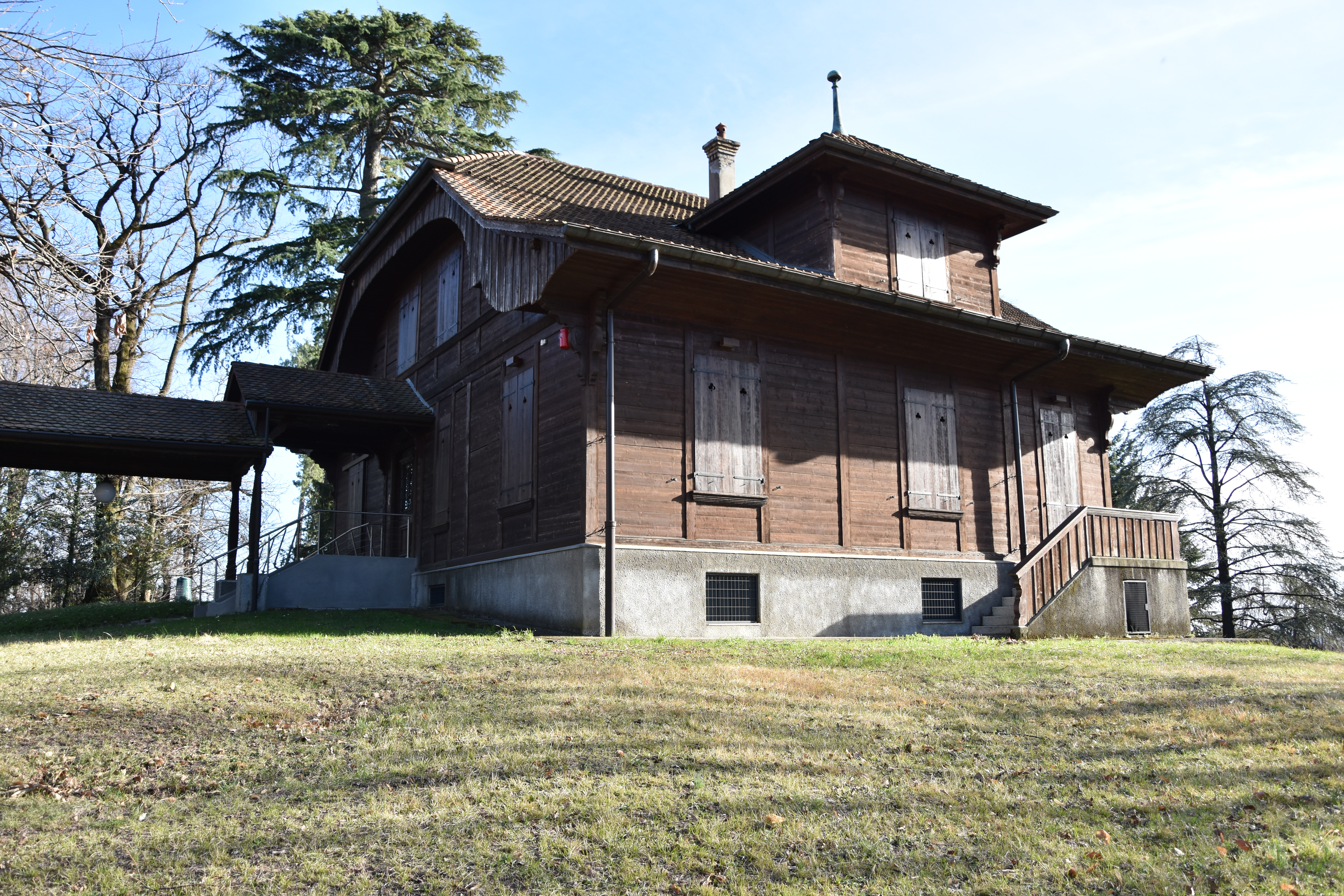
The Hungarian dacia

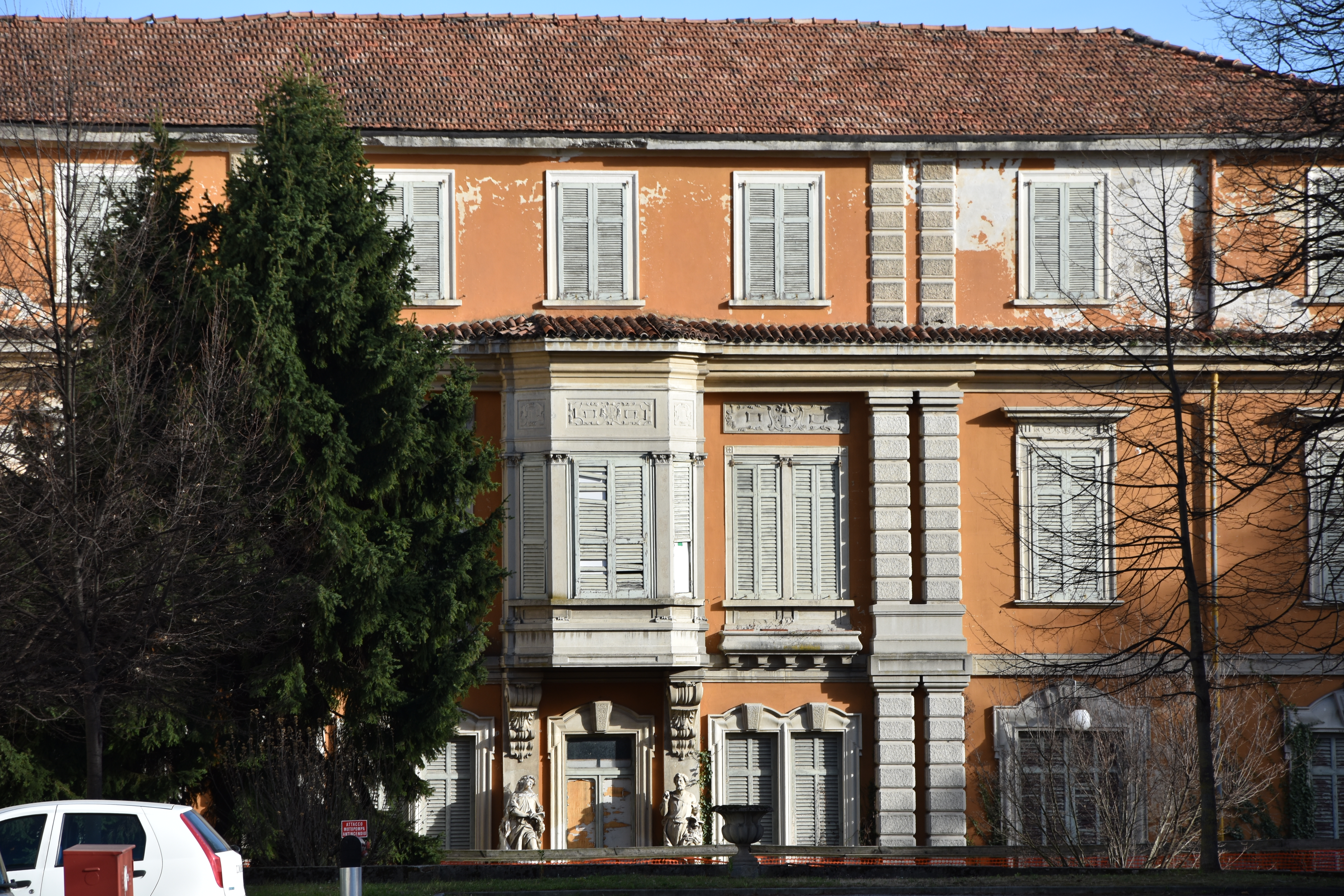
Internal facade

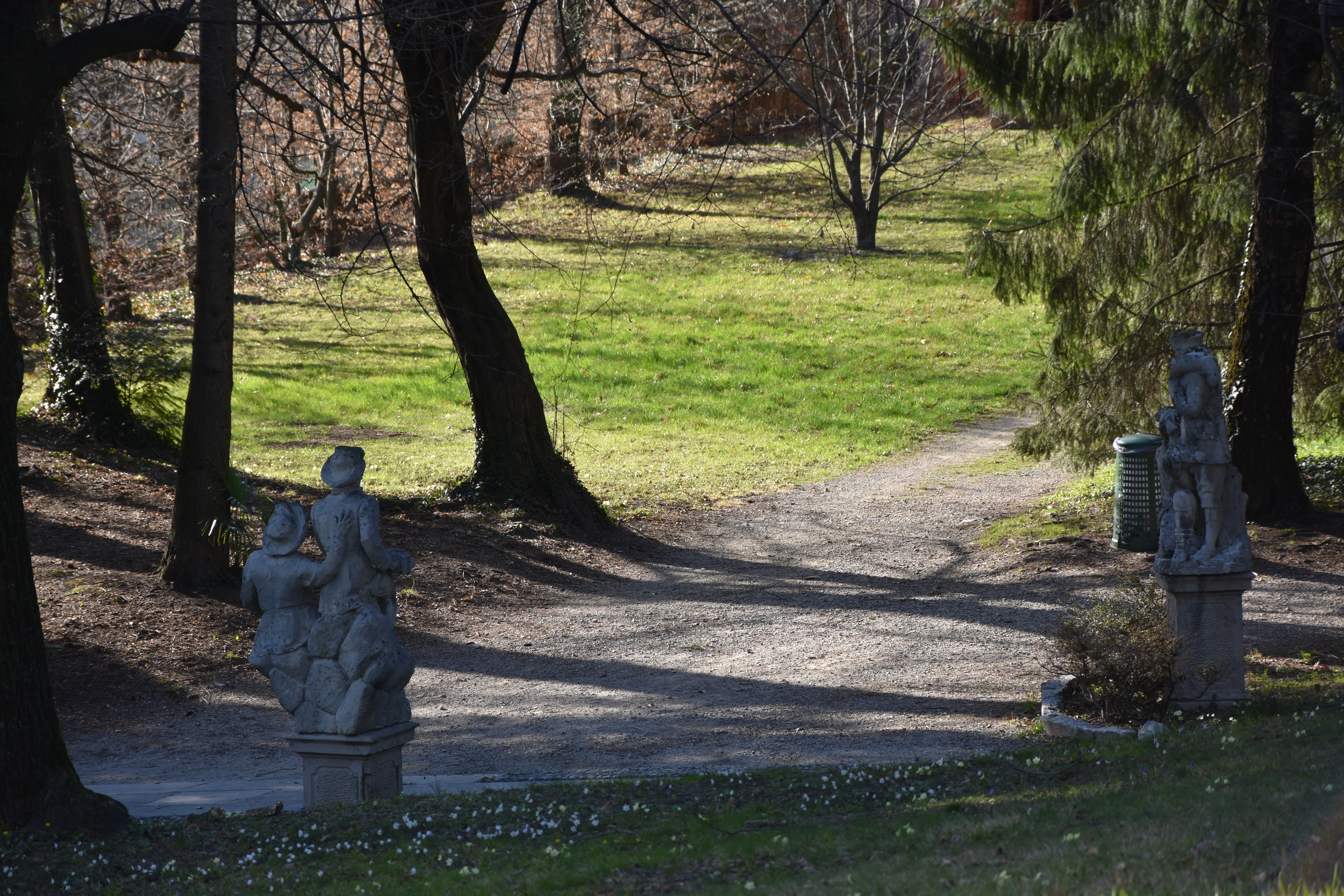
Park
