= Monuments of Busto Arsizio =

Monuments in Busto Arsizio, Italy

45°36′54.53″N 8°50′26.67″E

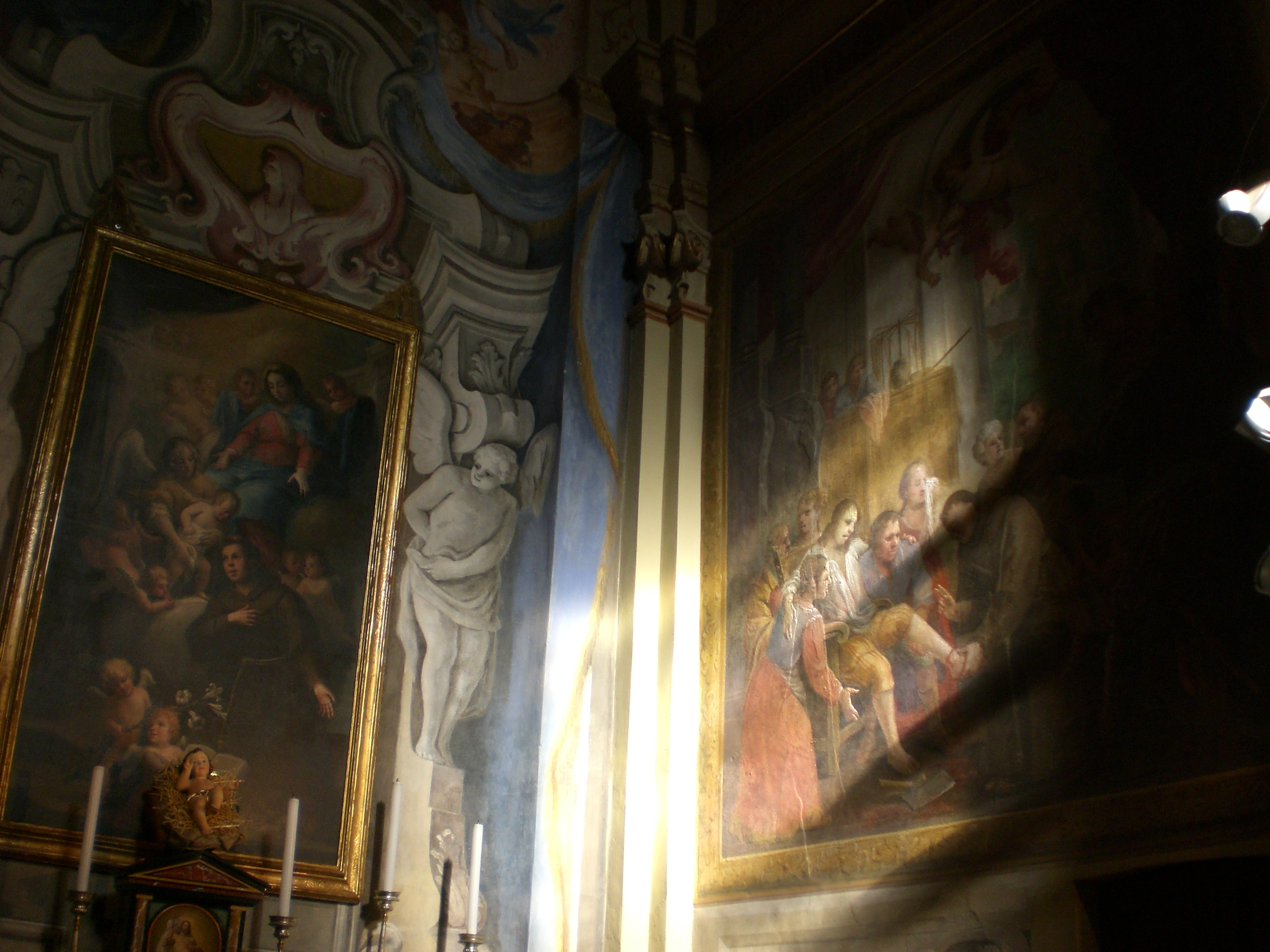
Church of St. Anthony of Padua, detail

Although it has been characterized in recent centuries as an essentially industrial city, Busto Arsizio counts among its most valuable buildings the numerous monuments of an ecclesiastical nature, testifying to the deep religiosity of its people. Of particular note are the Sanctuary of Santa Maria di Piazza, the Basilica of St. John the Baptist, and the Church of San Michele Arcangelo.

As for civil architecture and industrial archaeology, due to the great economic development at the beginning of the 20th century, a number of villas and several mansions, a good number of which are in Art Nouveau and Art Deco styles, are also worth mentioning.

A key element of Busto Arsizio, as of most Italian and European municipalities, is the square: there are three major squares in the historic center (Santa Maria, San Giovanni and Vittorio Emanuele II) to which can be added the central squares of the two former autonomous municipalities of Borsano and Sacconago. The meadows outside the embankment that surrounded the historic center of Busto Arsizio have in several cases been transformed into squares.

Finally, despite being part of a densely populated area as is the Olona Conurbation and in general the Alto Milanese, there is a consistent presence of parks both just outside the historic center and in the peripheral areas.

== Religious architecture ==
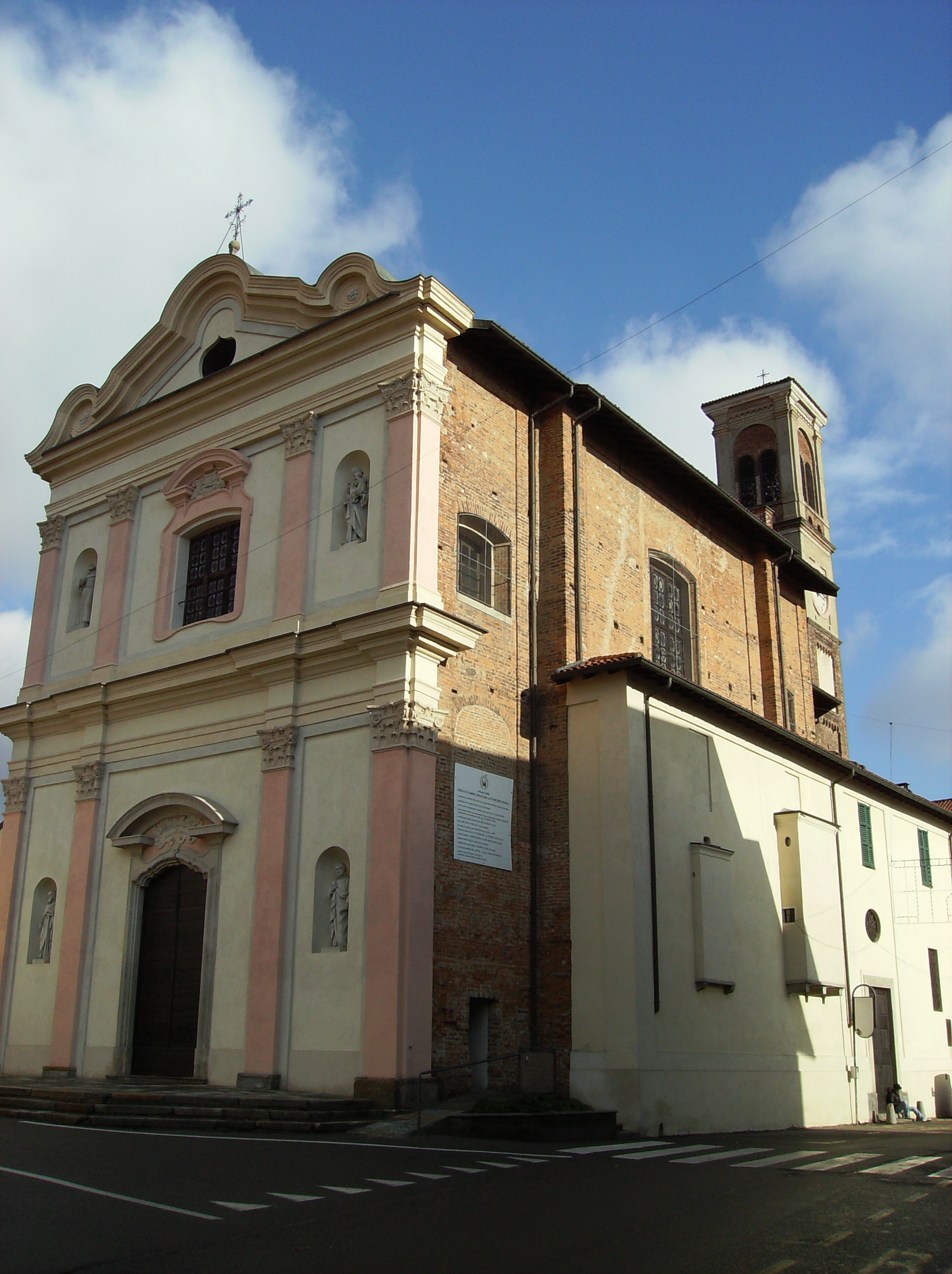
Eighteenth-century Church of the Holy Apostles Peter and Paul (Sacconago district)

At present, there are twenty-five churches, three cemeteries and several chapels in Busto Arsizio (such as the very large one at the Istituto Maria Immacolata or those at the hospital and the rest home). There is also the baptistery of San Filippo Neri (next to the parish church of San Giovanni) and several votive shrines.

In the course of history, many churches have been torn down to be later rebuilt with greater capacity. Other churches, on the other hand, have been permanently demolished: among them, in addition to the medieval ruins of Santa Croce, deconsecrated in 1948 and demolished in 1972, the Borsanese church of Santa Maria dei Restagni, the Sinaghina church of San Donato and the church of Sant'Eurosia in Cascina Brughetto (demolished in 1952).

In the case of Sacconago, the construction of the new church(1928) did not entail the demolition of the 18th-century church, since land belonging to the old cemetery was used for this purpose.

South of Piazza Santa Maria was a monastery of the Humiliati, dedicated to St Mary Magdalene. Along today's Via Pozzi there was a more recent monastery of Augustinian nuns, dedicated to St Jerome and founded in the mid 15th century. With an act dated 13 March 1576, Cardinal Borromeo united nuns and property in the first monastery, which was dedicated to both saints.

Some chapels and votive shrines have also been demolished over the years. One example is the small chapel of St. Alò in Vernaschella located between today's Via Silvio Pellico and the now suppressed branch of Via Confalonieri (formerly "Vernaschella"). Others, however, still exist, such as the aedicule of St. Charles Borromeo. The same fate befell the chapel of St Ambrose in Canton Santo, not far from the church of Santa Maria di Piazza.

=== Churches ===
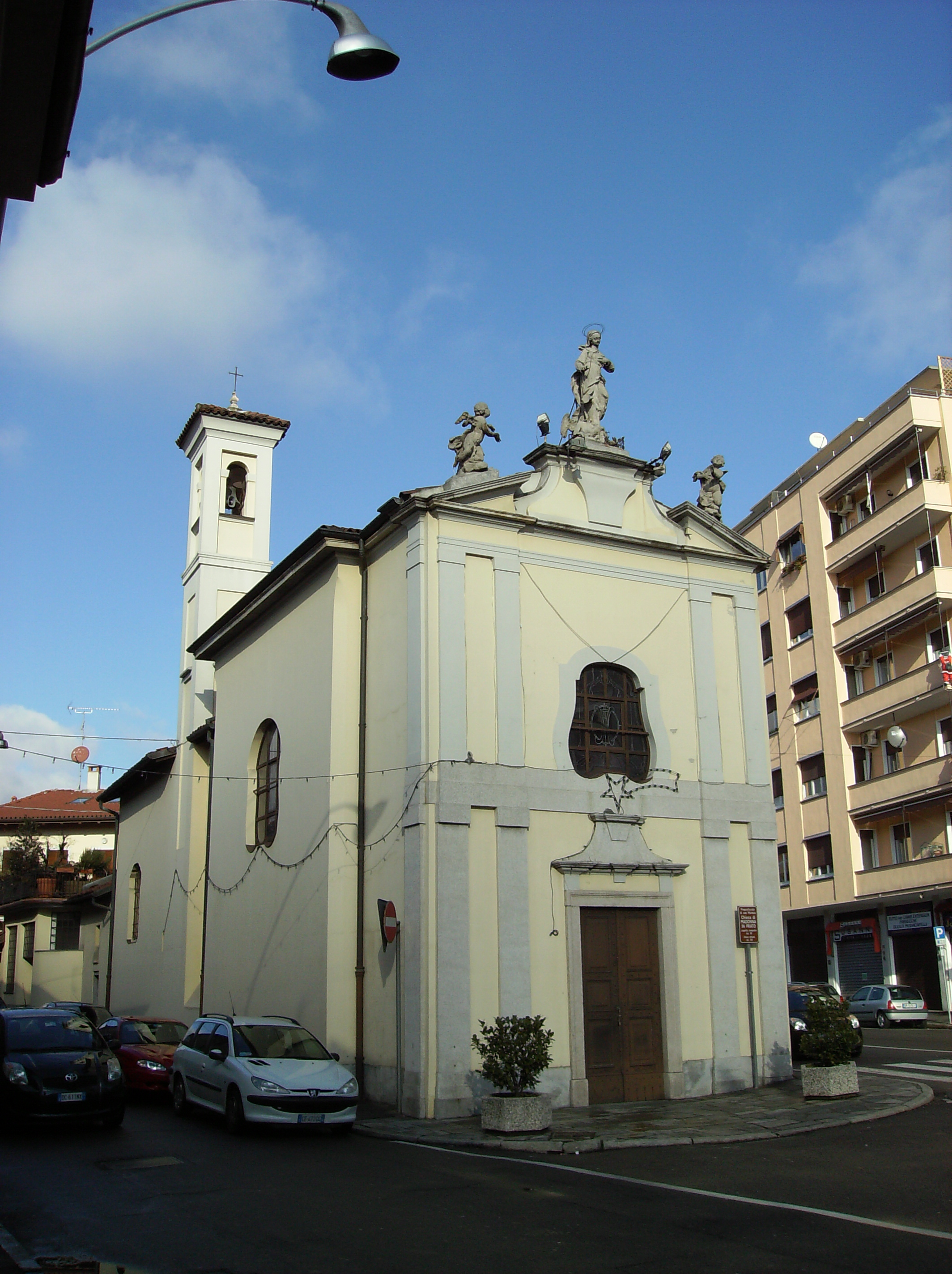
Church of Madonna in Prato

Some of the churches in Busto Arsizio, in particular St John the Baptist, St Michael Archangel and St Mary of Piazza, were built before the year 1000. During the communal period, the first rectories, later called parishes, were founded. They entailed the presence of a priest to whom the care of souls was entrusted and who generally resided in a pre-existing church. Busto Arsizio was subject to the parish church of Olgiate Olona, but the community, on the basis of its growing financial resources, set up five 'curate benefices' between the 13th and 16th centuries: three at the church of San Giovanni Battista and two at that of San Michele Arcangelo, while the church of Santa Maria, located in the central square of the village, was a sanctuary, without parish duties.

In 1583, St Charles Borromeo transferred the ecclesiastical dignities of the parish (i.e. the district) to Busto Arsizio, and the curates of St John and St Michael were elevated to the rank of canons, as coadjutors of the provost in the care of souls (Busto Arsizio was therefore formally considered a single parish).

In the 17th century a new religious fervour led to the construction of new churches, such as St Gregory in Camposanto (1632), Madonna in Veroncora (1639) and St Bernardino (1665), as well as the reconstruction of the churches of St John the Baptist (1609) and St Michael Archangel (1652). The 18th century saw the construction of Madonna in Campagna (1702), San Rocco (1706), the old church of Sacconago (1708), the church of St Anne (1710, later the Civic Temple), and the church of St Anthony of Padua (1717, in the Borsano area).

Busto remained a single parish until 1906, when San Michele was also given this function. Later, in 1928, Borsano and Sacconago were annexed to the municipality, bringing the number of parishes to four. In the course of the 20th century, the other parishes were then formed until they reached the current number of thirteen. This was the century in which the most churches were built (as many as eleven, to which can be added that of the Friars Minor, actually started in 1898, but completed during that century).

=== Monumental Cemetery ===
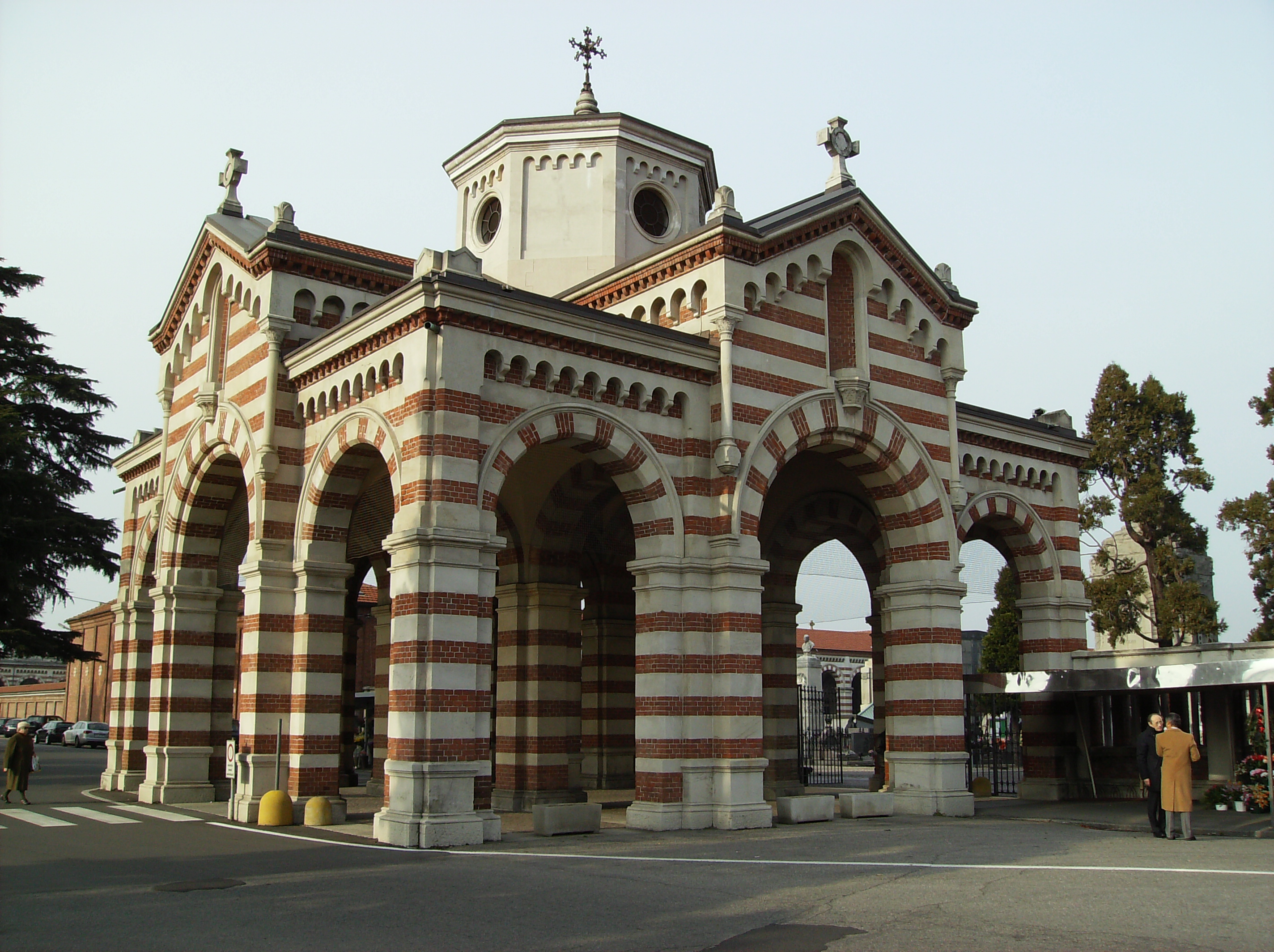
Monumental cemetery

The Monumental Cemetery is one of three cemeteries that currently exist in the Busto Arsizio area, in addition to the cemeteries of Sacconago and Borsano. It is located at the beginning of Via Favana, a road named after a farmstead on its route.

At the end of the 19th century, the previous cemetery, located just outside the inhabited area, on the land now occupied by the "Ugo Foscolo" park, which had become too small, was replaced by a new and more spacious one, designed by the engineer Ercole Seves on the model of Carlo Maciachini's cemetery in Milan and inaugurated in 1894, in a place then far from the inhabited area, at the crossroads between the Via per Lonate and Via Corbetta.

One of the most significant buildings is the Ottolini family mausoleum, designed by architect Camillo Crespi Balbi.

Over the years, the cemetery underwent several expansions, until it covered an area approximately double that of the original one. In the meantime, the city has also grown and the new district built around the church of Santa Maria Regina has surrounded the area.

=== Cemetery of Sacconago ===
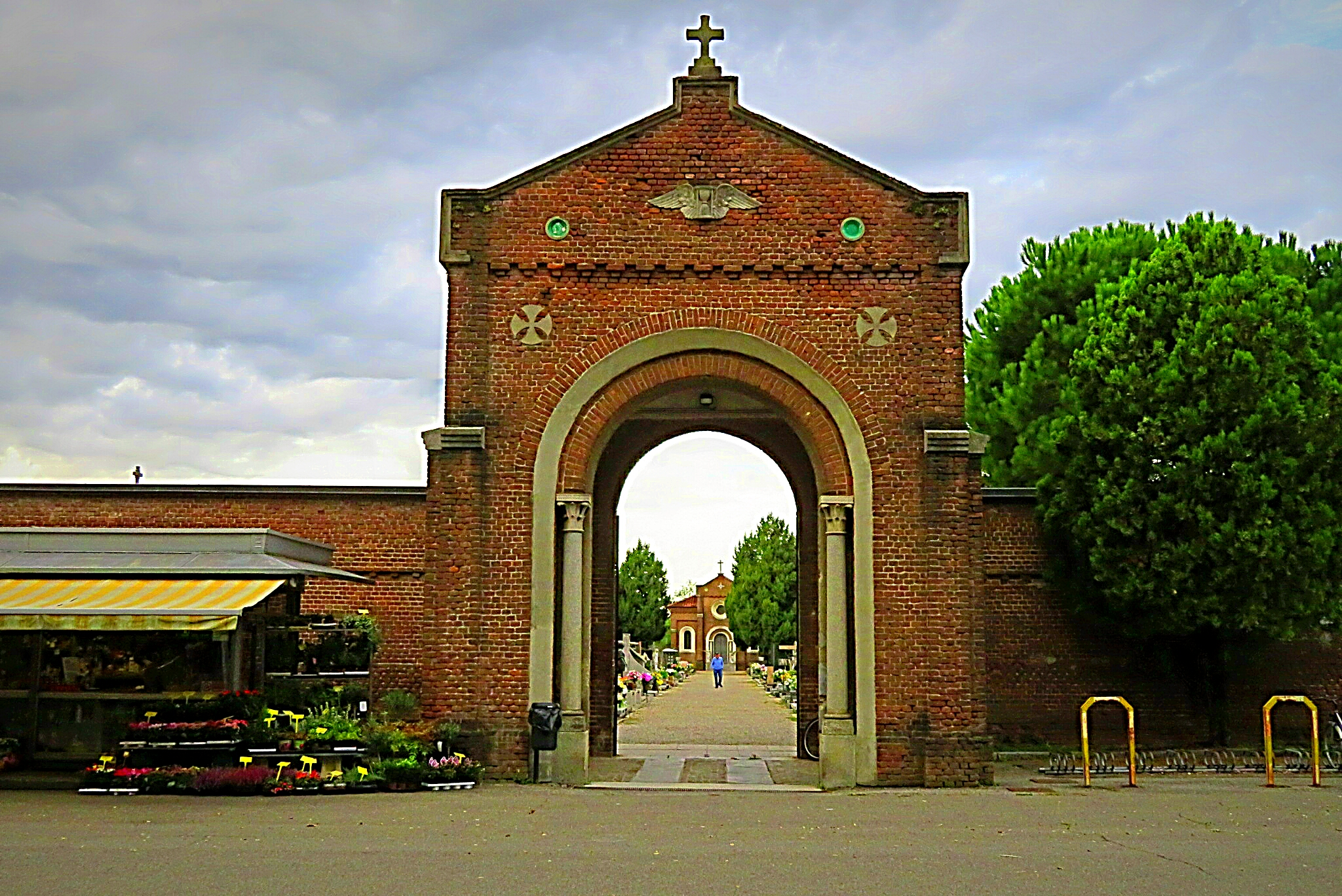
Sacconago Cemetery

Towards the middle of the 18th century, when the old cemetery next to the old parish church of St Apostles Peter and Paul became inadequate, a new cemetery was built outside the historic core of the former municipality of Sacconago, in the area where the new parish church has stood since 1928.

At the end of the 19th century, it was decided to move the cemetery again to an area south-west of the town centre, on Via Bienate, which connects Sacconago with the former autonomous municipality of Bienate. The new cemetery was designed by engineer Ercole Seves in 1898, who had already designed the Monumental Cemetery of Busto Arsizio a few years earlier. The first burial took place in 1908. Over the years, works were carried out to obtain an increasing number of available burial niches.

Given its location in the countryside between the town centre and the new industrial area, the Sacconago cemetery is, among the three current town cemeteries, the one that most easily allows future extensions. Some of the surrounding land is already owned by the municipality.

=== Cemetery of Borsano ===
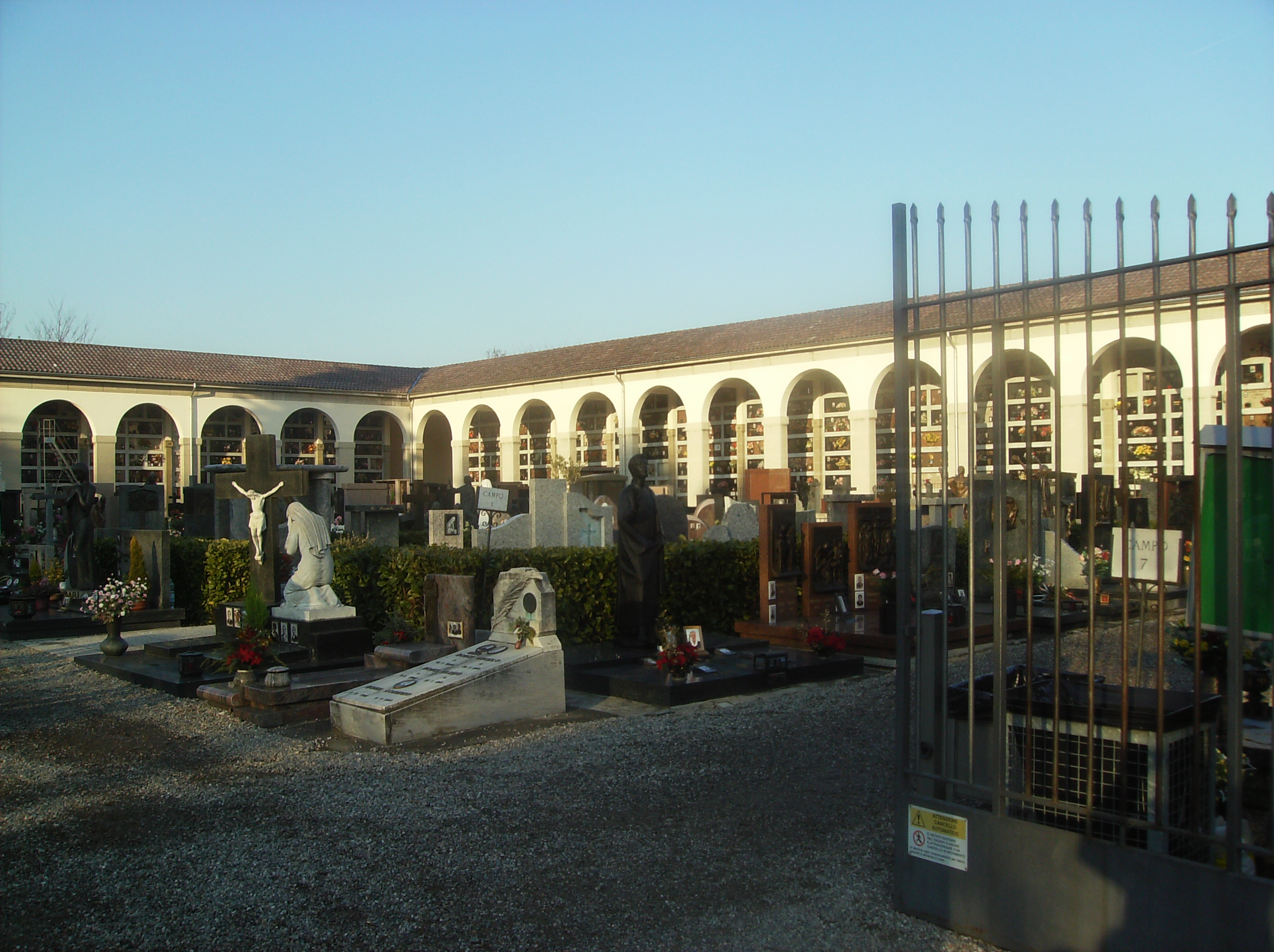
Old entrance to the cemetery in Borsano

The Borsano cemetery is one of three cemeteries in the city of Busto Arsizio, and is the smallest in size. It was probably built following the Napoleonic edict of 1804, which prohibited burials in built-up areas. Previously, parish priests, priests and important families were buried in the nave of the parish church. The other inhabitants of Borsano were buried in the adjacent cemetery.

The new cemetery was built in the vicinity of the parish church, near the country church of Santa Maria dei Restagni, demolished in 1954. Following the 1928 expansion, the area almost doubled. The cemetery was further extended eastwards, but not northwards, due to disputes over minimum distances from houses. Also for this reason, an area would soon be decommissioned.

On either side of the cemetery entrance, on the inner side of the fence, are the tombstones of Ermenegilda ('Gilda') Rossi (a schoolteacher in Borsano from 1858, whose plaque bears the following inscription: "with 40 years of teaching, she spread with wise care and maternal affection the threefold love of God to Family and Country") and of Giuseppe Usuelli (born in Menzago or Vanzago around 1826 and died in Borsano in 1894, who named his universal heirs the Stelline, the orphans of Milan, who bring him a bouquet of flowers every year on the anniversary of the deceased).

In June 2008, the wide space in front of the main entrance was dedicated to Don Alessandro Bossi, a former parish priest, entrepreneur and writer. In 2017, the new entrance was built.

=== Votive chapels and shrines ===
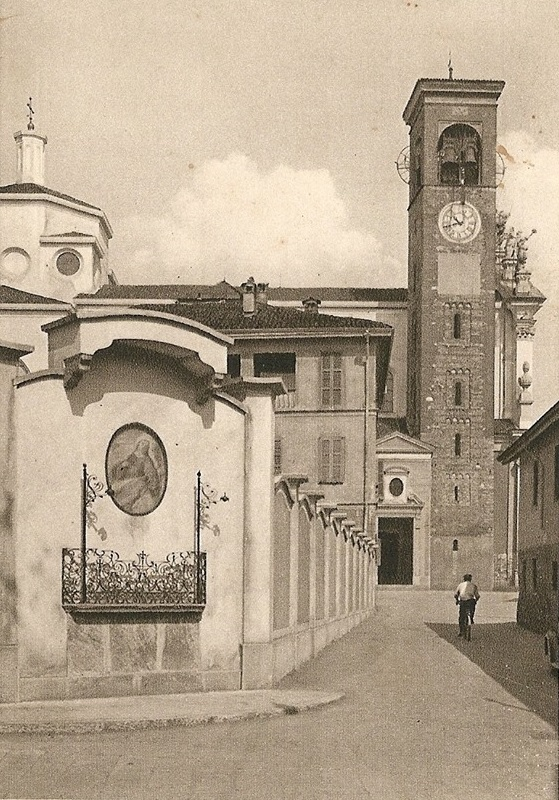
Wayside shrine of Our Lady on Matteotti Street

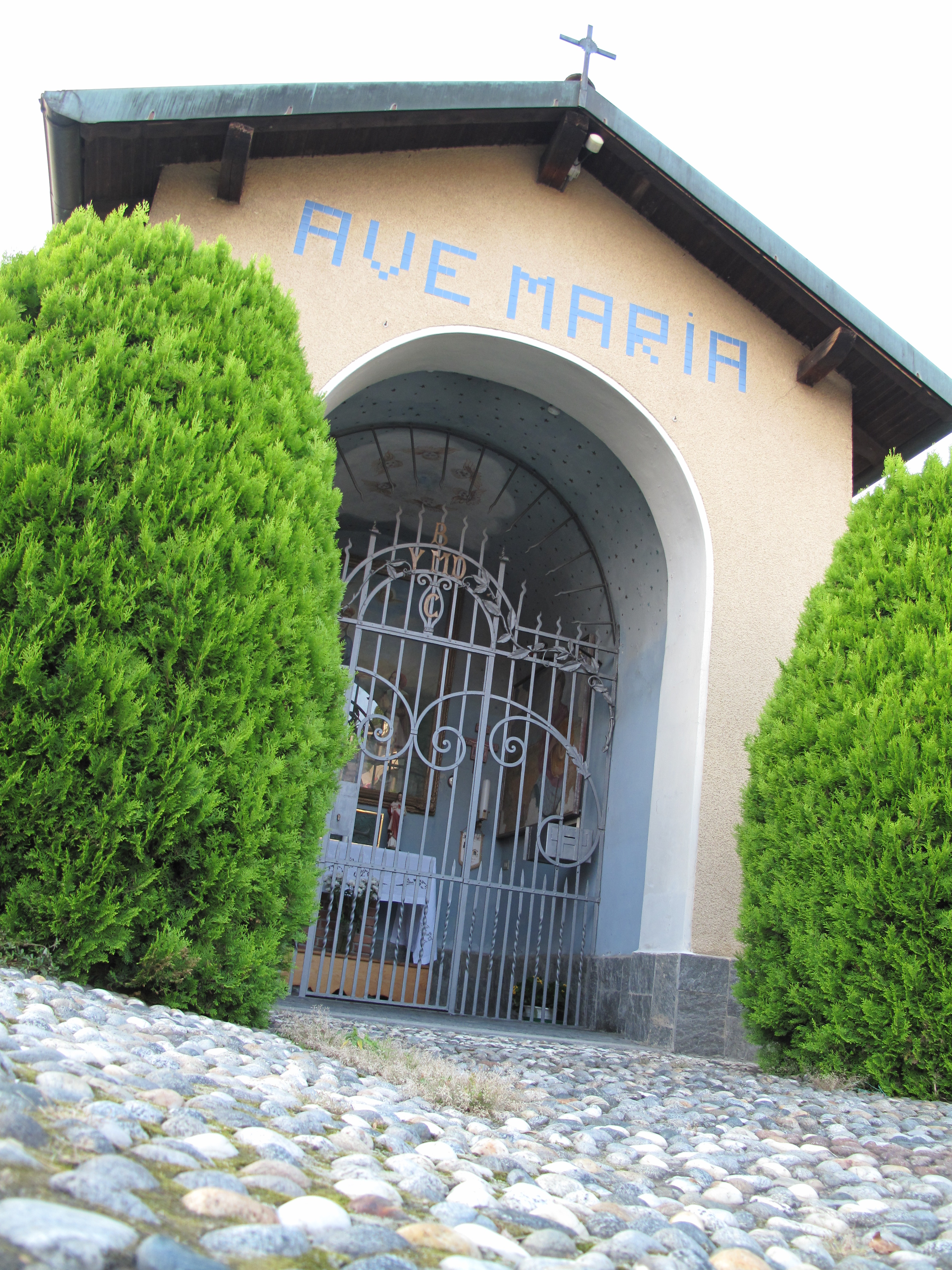
Chapel of Our Lady of Caravaggio

Existing chapels in the area include the 18th-century one dedicated to the Madonna di Caravaggio at the junction between Via Quintino Sella and Viale della Repubblica (in which there are two canvases by Carlo Farioli from 1992 depicting the Blessed Bernardino and Giuliana from Busto) and the 19th-century one of Santa Maria Nascente in Via Daniele Crespi, near Piazza Trento e Trieste. The latter was originally a rural aedicule located in what is now the square. It was then demolished in 1802 to make way for via Daniele Crespi. It was rebuilt two years later, and in the years between 1862 and 1864 it was moved to its current position and then incorporated into the palace that was built around it. In the fresco on the wall there is a depiction of the plague, surmounted by the figure of the Virgin Mary. On the left accompanies her the pilgrim Saint Roch and on the right is Saint Sebastian.

Among the chapels that have disappeared is the chapel of St. Alò in Vernaschella, the name of which, according to some, refers to St. Aegidius, a French bishop who lived between 590 and 660, and according to others to St. Anathalon, the first Ambrosian bishop. The building stood in the middle of the crossroads between today's Via Silvio Pellico (formerly 'Vernasca') and the now suppressed branch of today's Via Confalonieri (formerly 'Vernaschella'). The chapel, the first written records of which date back to 1630, was demolished in 1914 with the promise to build another one at the crossroads of via Silvio Pellico and via Piombina (today via Venegoni), but the project was never implemented. The same fate befell the chapel of St Ambrose in Canton Santo.

Among the votive shrines still existing in Busto Arsizio, mention can be made of the 17th-century one of San Carlo Borromeo in Via Matteotti and the 18th-century one of the Madonna in Via Matteotti (corner of Via Ariberto), restored in 1990, with a painting by Biagio Bellotti.

== Villas and palaces ==
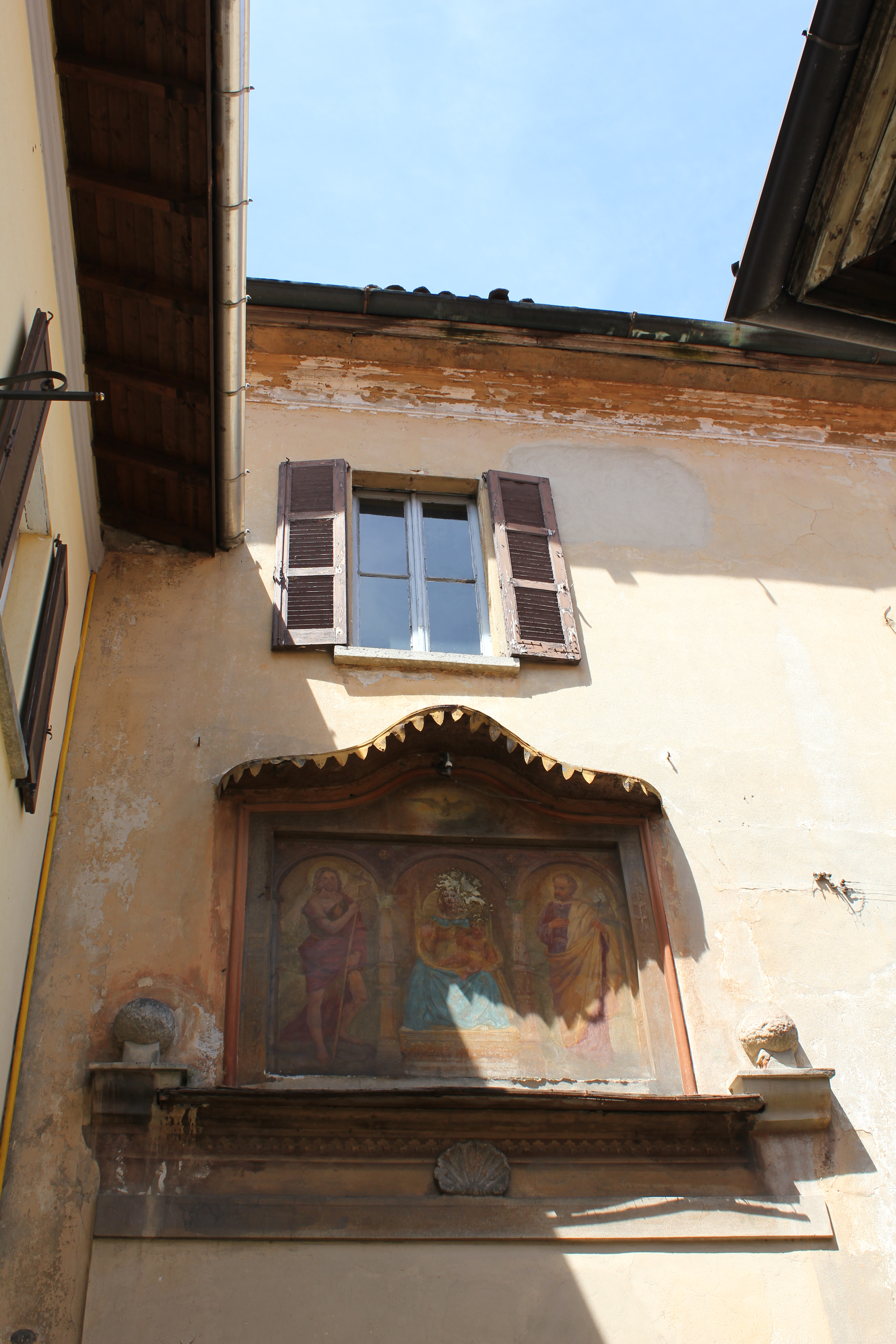
Casa Custodi. Fresco by Carlo Grossi of Our Lady of Help, to whom the people of Busto have been devoted for centuries.

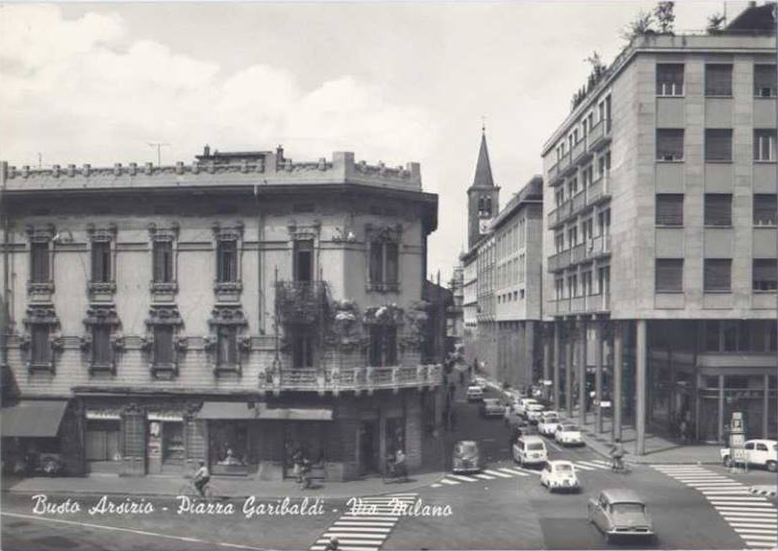
Rena House, the work of Silvio Gambini now demolished

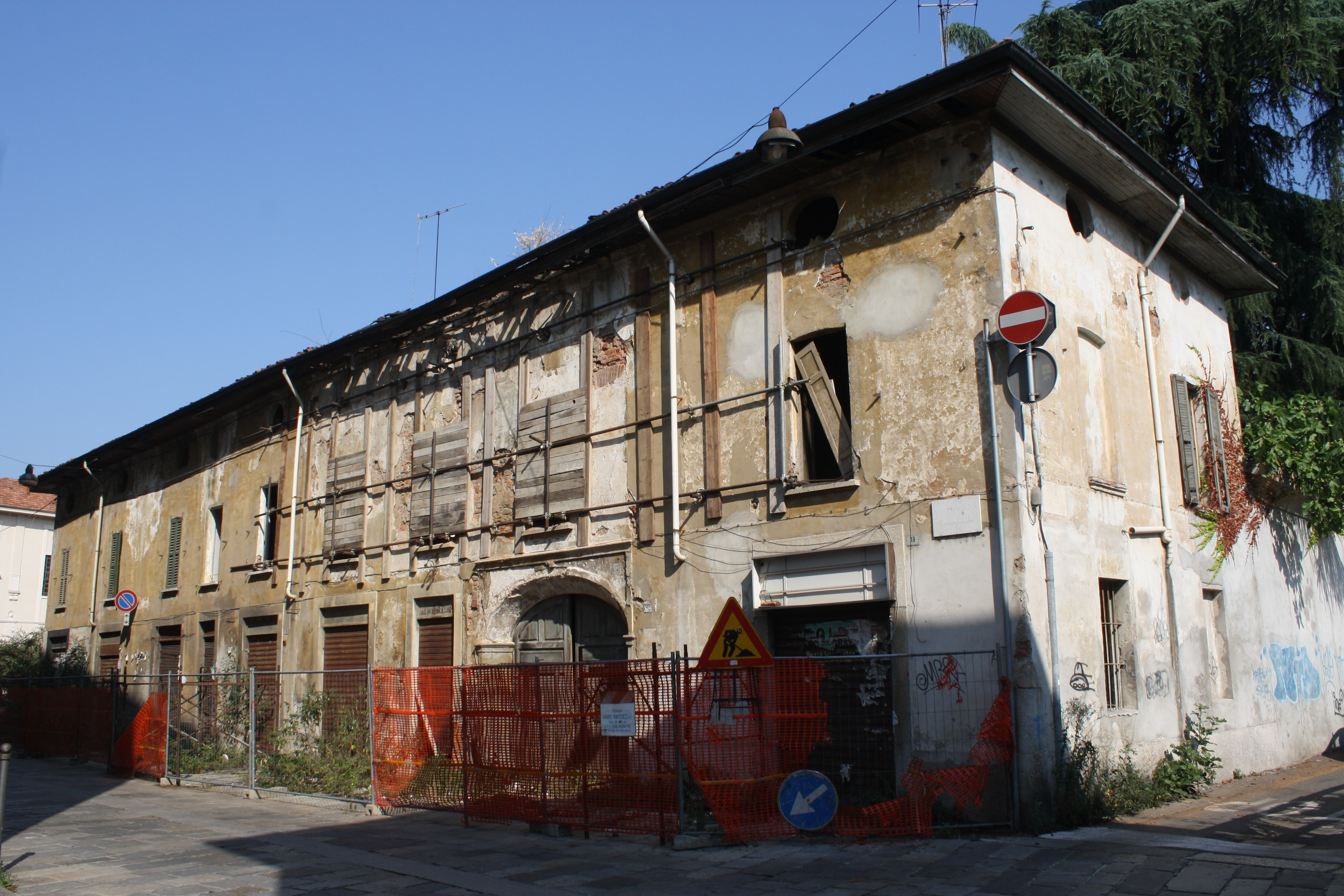
Canavesi-Bossi House in August 2015

In Busto Arsizio there are Art Nouveau villas, palaces, and remnants of industrial structures built on the edge of the historic center during the period of industrial development. Two of the most important villas are the Ottolini-Tosi and Ottolini-Tovaglieri, in neo-medieval style, located near one of the buildings of the former Busto Arsizio Cotton Mill (now the Museum of Textiles and Industrial Tradition of Busto Arsizio), both designed by architect Camillo Crespi Balbi.

Other architecturally interesting buildings are the Villa Leone, located on Via XX Settembre, and the Molini Marzoli Massari, overlooking Via Cadorna, both designed by architect Silvio Gambini in Art Nouveau style. Also worth mentioning are the Marliani-Cicogna palace, now the seat of the municipal library and once the residence of the Count of Busto Arsizio, and, just outside the limits of the old town, the Gilardoni palace, the current seat of the town hall and former town hospital.

Some civil architecture has been lost, such as the sumptuous Villa Bossi-Gabardi on Via Mameli, designed by Duilio Torres and built after 1925. All that remained of that villa after its demolition in 1969 was the gate, which is now the Park's entrance to Art Nouveau. The monument inside the park is evidence of another elegant building that has been lost: the Rena house in Garibaldi Square, designed by Silvio Gambini and built between 1906 and 1907. Also lost is Antonio Ottolini's villa, on San Michele Street, by Camillo Crespi Balbi and of no less beauty than the other two, by Ernesto and Enrico Ottolini.

Recently, the old buildings along Via Solferino also suffered the same fate and were demolished between August and September 2010. The same happened to the Ca' Bianca on Via Pisacane, an Art Nouveau building built in 1939 and designed by architect Silvio Gambini.

Some important 18th-century buildings, on the other hand, are in a state of disrepair. One of them is the Custodi house, which is already listed in the land register of the 1700s along with other adjacent ones as the property of the Custodi family, which included some of the protagonists of the history of the municipality from the 16th century onward. In the cadastral map of 1857, a private place of worship open to public worship can be identified. Of that chapel, dedicated to the Blessed Virgin Mary, it is still possible to see the entrance portal in Custodi alley, surmounted by Carlo Grossi's fresco. Another eighteenth-century dwelling is in a state of disrepair: the Canavesi-Bossi house, known as "il Conventino," whose cellars are of sixteenth-century origin. In the Borsano district, the Cascina Burattana, one of the last examples of the agricultural heritage of the city of Busto Arsizio, is also in a state of disrepair.

In some circumstances, buildings in a state of decay have been recovered. One case is that of Villa Luigi Colombo on Via Manara, designed in 1906 by Silvio Gambini in Art Nouveau style. The restoration coincided with the gutting of the building, of which only the exterior wall on Via Manara and the two exterior walls perpendicular to it remained. Of the interior, it was possible to recover the helicoidal staircase decorated with wrought iron representing harmonious phytomorphic intertwining.

=== Ottolini-Tosi Villa ===
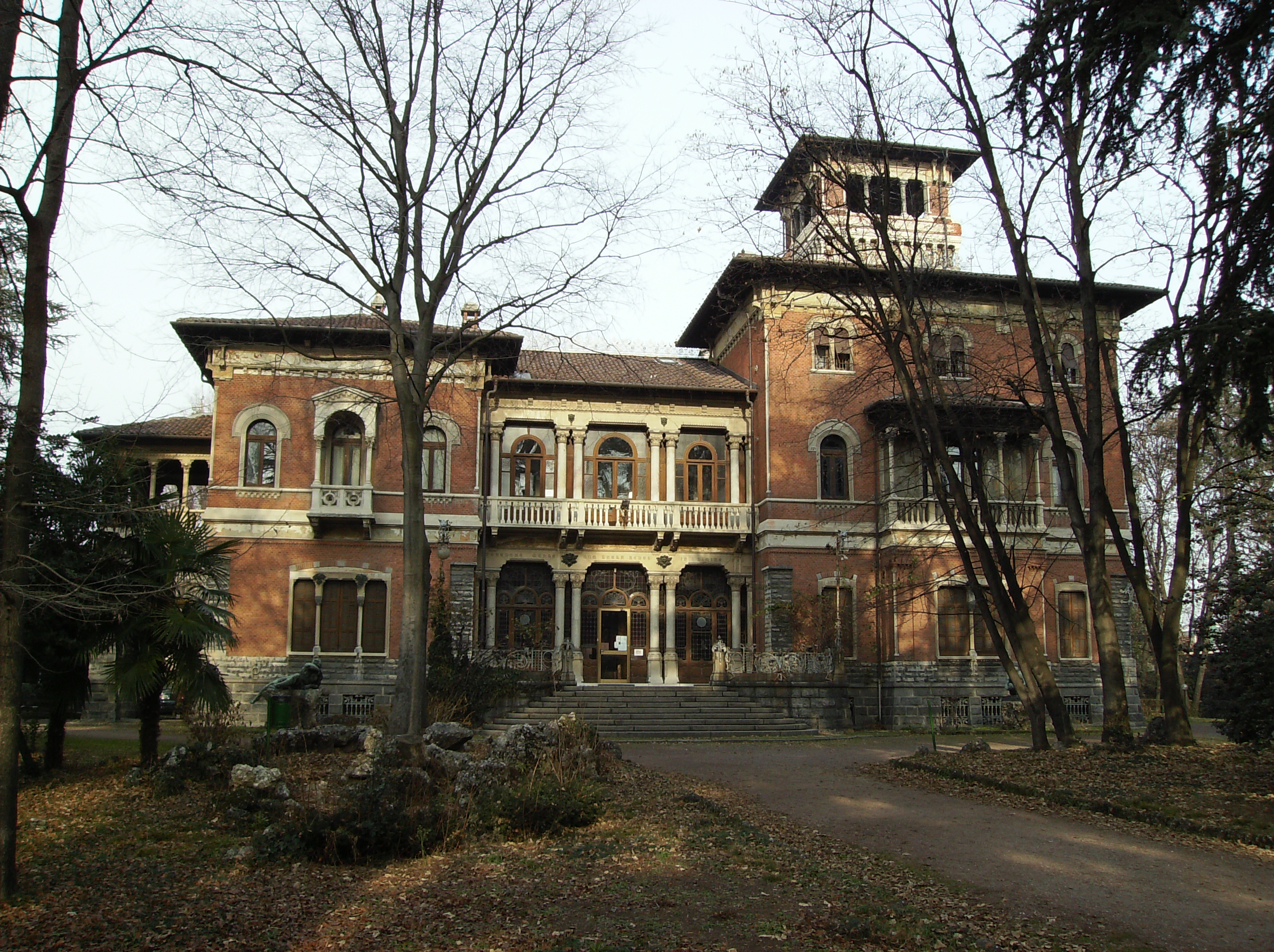
Ottolini-Tosi Villa

The Ottolini-Tosi villa was owned by Ernesto Ottolini, one of the three sons of Carlo Ottolini, the owner of the cotton mill of the same name. It is located a short distance from the other two residences that housed the family of Ernesto and Antonio Ottolini (the latter was later demolished). The design of the villa was drawn up by Camillo Crespi Balbi, the family's trusted architect, and the building was constructed in 1902.

The villa has the shape of a medieval castle: it has two main floors above ground and one, which is a basement, intended for service rooms. At the southwest end there is a third floor above ground. The villa is dominated by a keep that constitutes a kind of guard room.

Freshly hewn stone and exposed brick were used for the construction. The wrought irons were made by Lombard artisan Alessandro Mazzucotelli.

The most valuable interior room is the hall, embellished with mosaics and a ceiling of ornate exposed beams.

=== Ottolini-Tovaglieri Villa ===
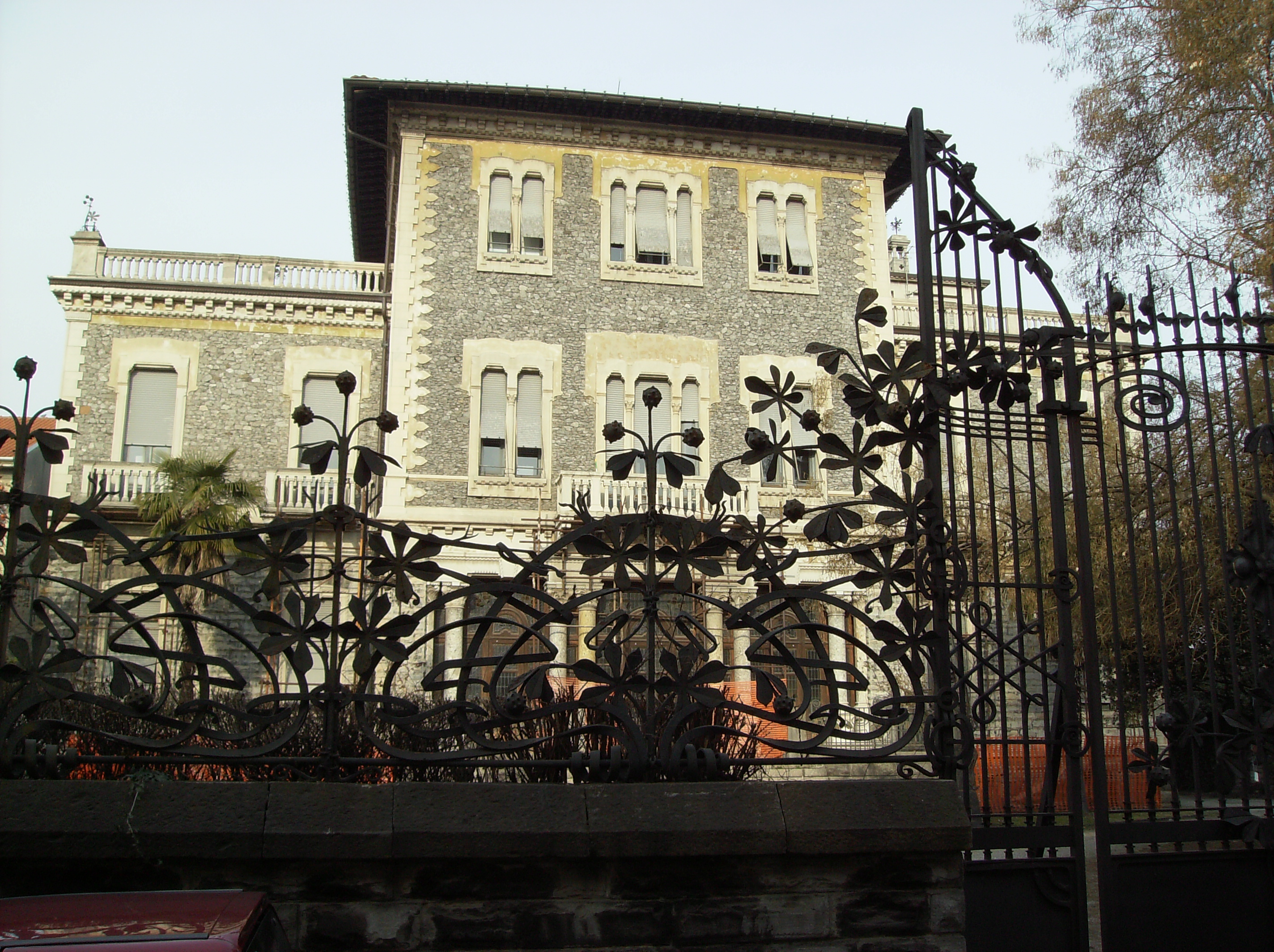
Ottolini-Tovaglieri Villa

The Ottolini-Tovaglieri villa was owned by Enrico Ottolini, one of the three sons of Carlo Ottolini, the owner of the cotton mill of the same name. It was built to a design by Camillo Crespi Balbi in front of the cotton mill he owned. The building, located on the inner edge of the city's historic center near the church of San Michele Arcangelo, represented a monument to the economic power of Busto Arsizio's industrial bourgeoisie.

The building consists of three floors plus a basement used for cellars. The mezzanine floor, which rests on a plinth of large square stone blocks, is clad in roughly squared blocks arranged in rows of gradually decreasing thickness. The exterior is characterized by a very small green space, making the villa look like a town palace.

The wrought irons, with decorations in the shape of leaves and fruits of the horse chestnut tree, are the work of Alessandro Mazzucotelli.

The interior reveals a strong taste for decoration. The large and bright south entrance space has polychromatic floors, frescoes on the walls, and an elaborate beamed ceiling.

=== Comerio Villa ===
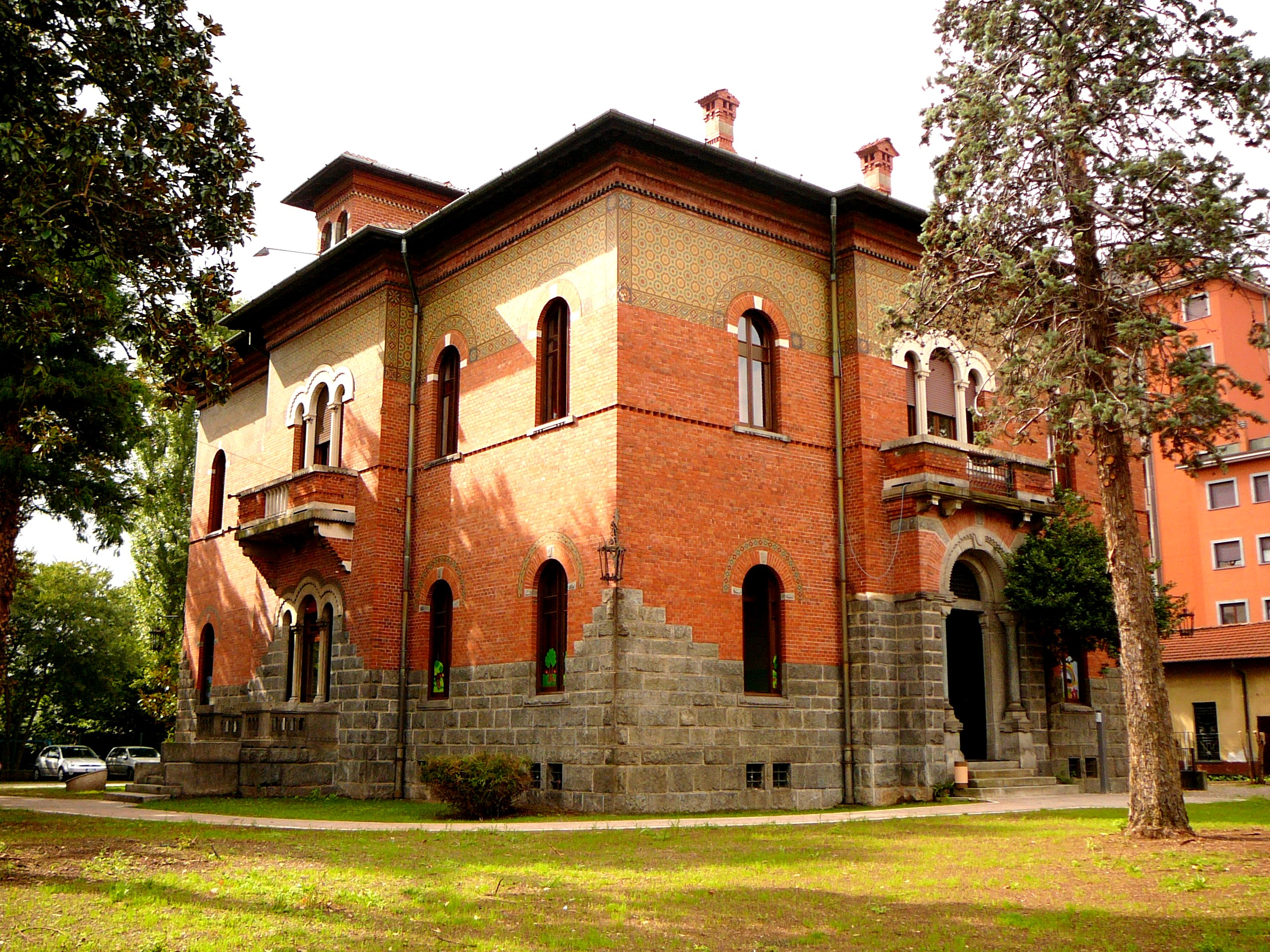
Comerio Villa.

The Villa Comerio was designed by Camillo Crespi Balbi at the behest of industrialist Ercole Comerio, owner of the company of the same name. It was built in 1923 and stands outside the historic center of Busto Arsizio, a few meters from the park located on the area where the Comerio company once stood. It resembles in some aspects the other two Busto villas of the Balbi: Villa Ottolini-Tosi and Villa Ottolini-Tovaglieri. Since 1977 it has been owned by the municipality of Busto Arsizio.

=== Leone Villa ===
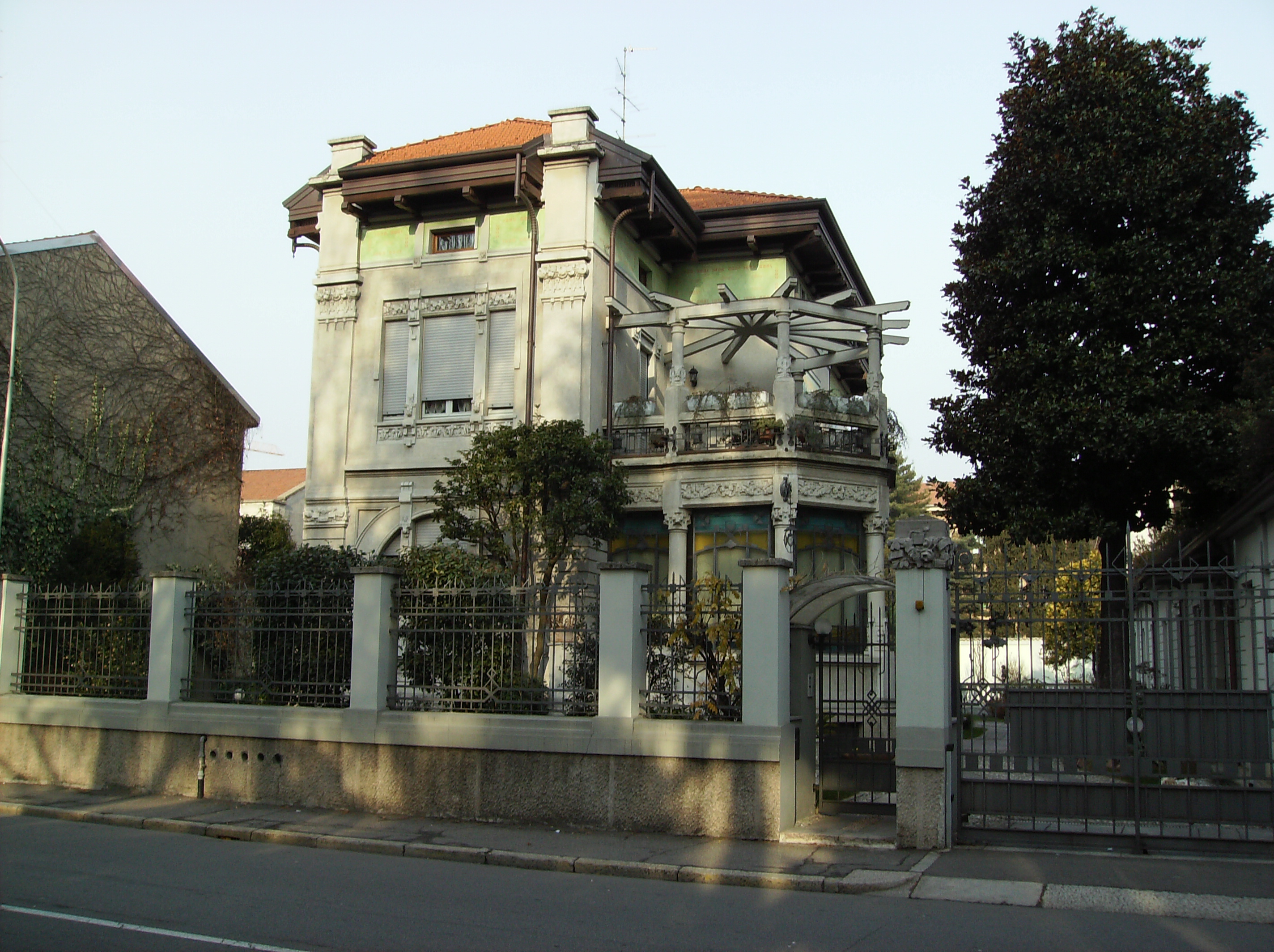
Leone Villa

The villa overlooks Corso XX Settembre, the road that connects the city of Busto Arsizio with the neighboring town of Castellanza. It was designed in Art Nouveau style by architect Silvio Gambini in 1910. The structure of the building has remained unchanged over the years, albeit with the loss of some decorative details, such as the colored eaves band.

It features two raised floors and a spacious attic. The veranda, which juts out from the main body, is covered by a terrace of sunburst rafters and has columns with capitals decorated with bundles of roses. The tripartite ovoid window echoes that of Villa Ferrario on Via Palestro, also by Silvio Gambini, designed in 1903. In the center of the window is placed a roundel with the initials of the first owner of the house, Leone Edoardo. The facade is enlivened by projecting cornices, lesenes and profiling.

Although it takes up compositional elements already used in earlier buildings, it represents a turning point in Silvio Gambini's formal path, which is evidenced by the abandonment of the rigidity of symmetry.

=== Marliani-Cicogna Palace ===
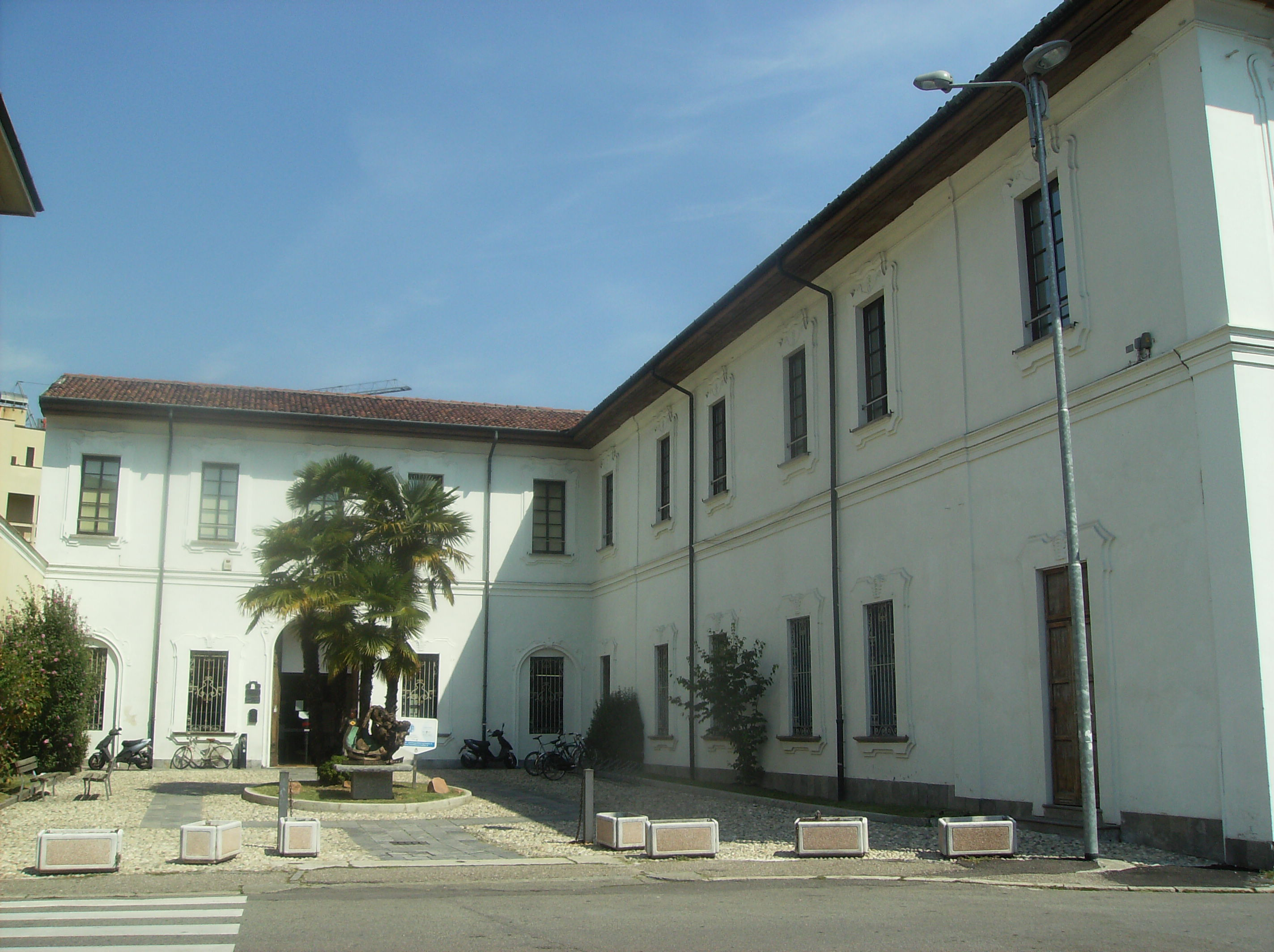
Marliani-Cicogna Palace

The palace is located on the central Piazza Vittorio Emanuele II (ancient square "dùl Conti").

Count Luigi Marliani purchased an ancient 16th-century building from the Rasini family and the part of the moat that overlooked it, to build his own residence there between 1624 and 1653 through major transformations and extensions. The layout was later further modified in the first half of the 18th century. Around 1820, the Cicogna Mozzoni family, which had obtained the property from the Gamberana counts, sold it to the municipality, which placed the municipal and district offices there, in the vicinity of the new prisons at the rear, arranged in the building designed by Francesco Croce in 1762 as a house of correction for youth and hotel for the poor.

After the municipal deputation moved to the new town hall in Palazzo Gilardoni, in 1862 it was decided to repair the building to adapt it for use as a district court. The judicial offices were then moved to another location around 1970, while the Civic Library had moved there in the 1950s. Today it is home to the municipal library and the Civic Art Collections.

A war memorial was placed in the center of the Vittorio Emanuele II Square in front of it in 1958, which was dismantled on August 23, 2010 and then moved to Trento and Trieste Square. It was planned to restore the buildings in Vittorio Emanuele II Square by 2012, with the construction of an underground parking garage.

=== Gilardoni Palace ===
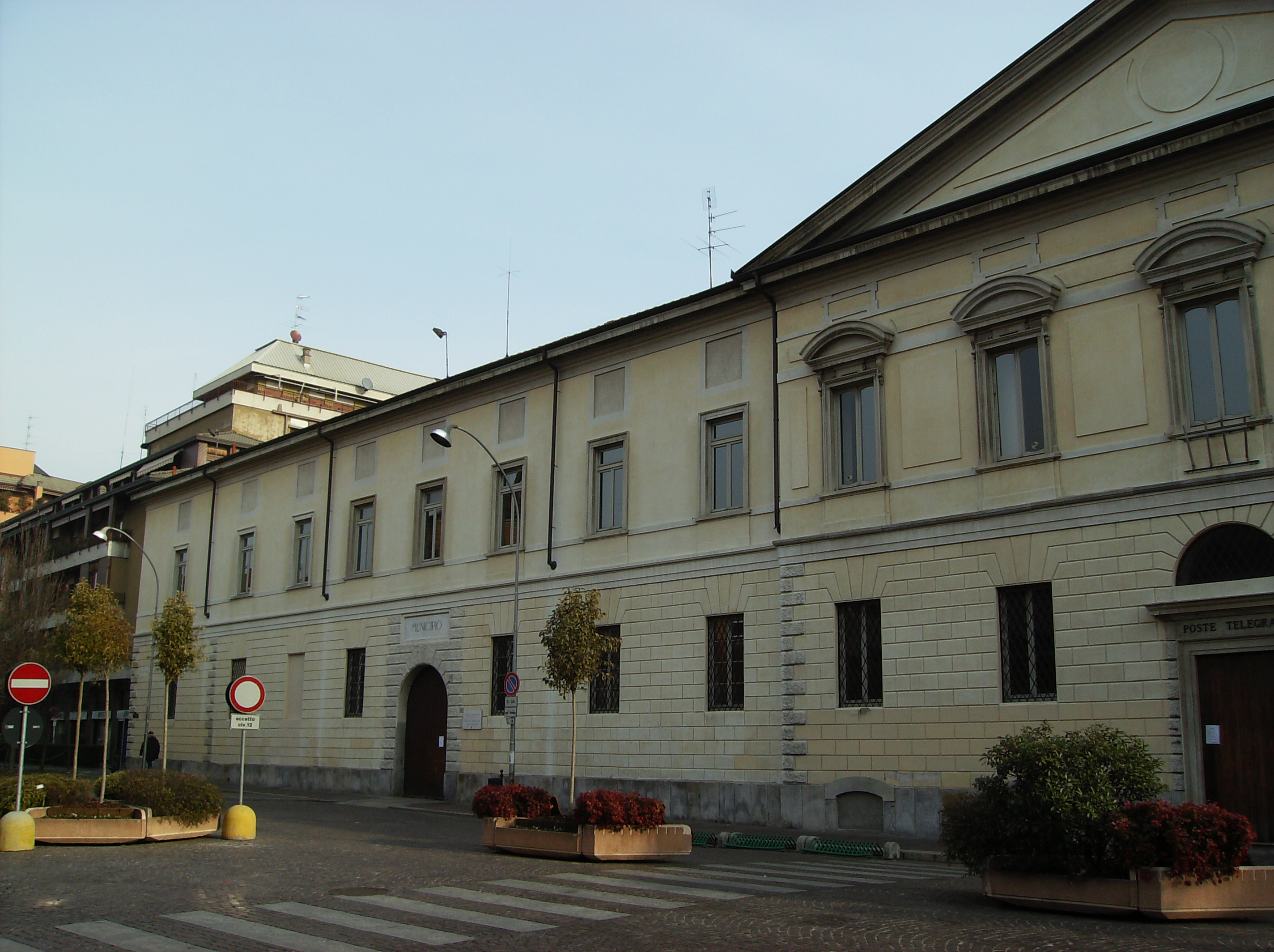
Gilardoni Palace

Located just outside the limits of the old town, it was built in the mid-nineteenth century to the design of architect Pietro Gilardoni and opened from 1853 under the name San Giuseppe Hospital.

Busto Arsizio had needed a hospital for years. Canons Benedetto Ladriani and Biagio Bellotti had bequeathed, in their wills of 1729 and 1784 respectively, substantial sums of money to the religious confraternity called the "School of the Poor." The second sum remained pending until 1821, when it was disbursed by the canon's descendants with the condition that a city hospital be built. Pietro Gilardoni, a pupil of the Austrian architect Leopoldo Pollack (author of the Royal Villa in Milan), was then commissioned. The hospital was expanded at first in 1875 and later in 1903, again due to a lack of beds, which increased from the initial 30 to 60 in the early 20th century. In 1905 construction of the new hospital began on a large plot of land north of the city.

=== Villino Dircea Gambini ===
Located between the historic center and Busto Arsizio station, exactly at 29 Goffredo Mameli Street, this building was the home of architect Silvio Gambini, who was also its designer. Built in 1921, the villa was named after Dircea Pedrazzini, the architect's wife. It is a three-story brick building with an ashlar base. It has decorations around the windows and in a tall cornice on the second floor.

=== Nicora-Colombo Villa ===
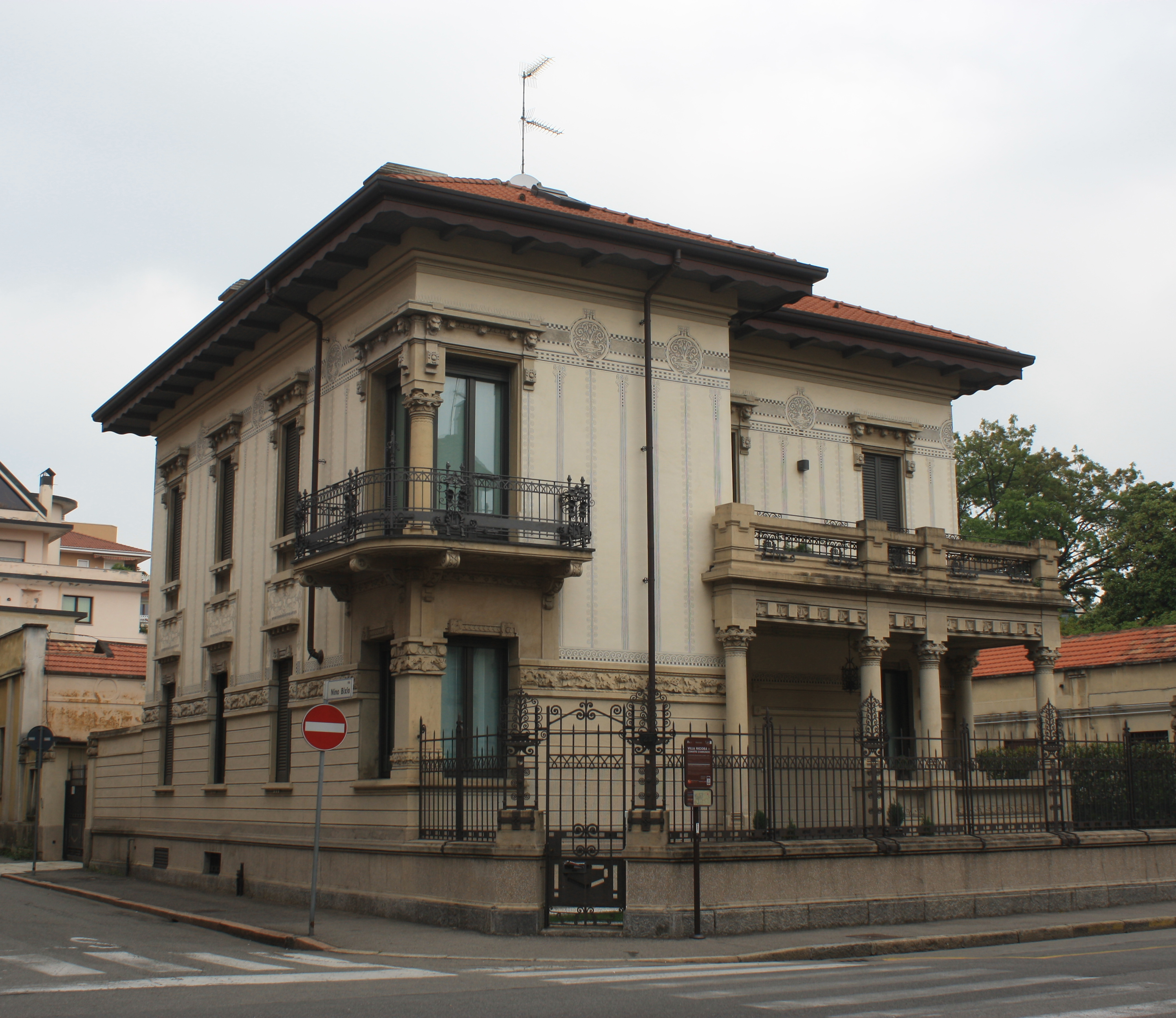
Nicora-Colombo Villa

Located on Goffredo Mameli Street, it was built in 1911 and designed by architect Silvio Gambini. It is an Art Nouveau building with an L-shaped plan built for entrepreneur Giovanni Nicora near his company's facilities. It features a prominent portico, supported by five columns and topped by a terrace with a concrete and wrought-iron balustrade. One of these columns is found in the small balcony located on the second floor in the southwest corner, decorated with geometric ornamental motifs that are repeated above all the windows (along with lion heads) and in the portico.

At the height of the ground-floor windows is a frame with floral motifs that divides the upper, smooth-plastered part of the villa from the lower, rustic-plastered part. A ribbon with stylized motifs connects the first-floor cymatiums.

=== Casa Colombo ===
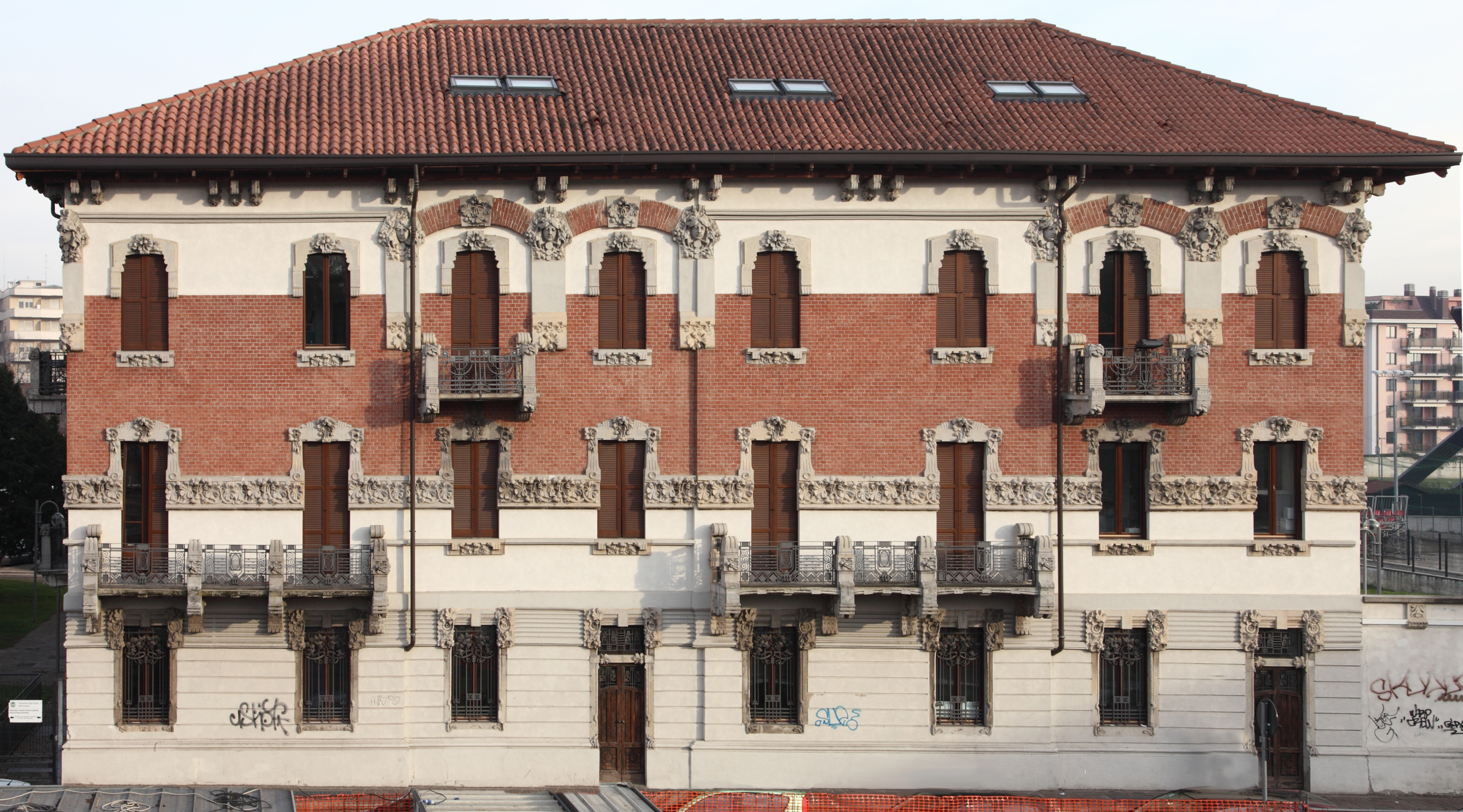
Casa Colombo

It was designed as the private residence of Luigi Colombo, an industrialist and owner of the weaving mill of the same name, and built in 1915 to a design by architect Silvio Gambini. The building is a three-story house in Art Nouveau style. The west façade, facing the street, is marked by different materials and decorations that alternate from the bottom to the top: on the ground floor is a band of banded stone, as high as the windows, which once connected to the now-demolished boundary wall. This band is topped by a second one with smooth plaster overlaid with a ribbon decoration that connects all the first-floor windows to the centerline: it is made of concrete grit decorated with horse chestnut leaves. Continuing upward there is an area of exposed brickwork that reaches to the mezzanine of the second-floor windows, where it breaks off, leaving space for a new band of smooth plaster.

=== Casa Castiglioni ===
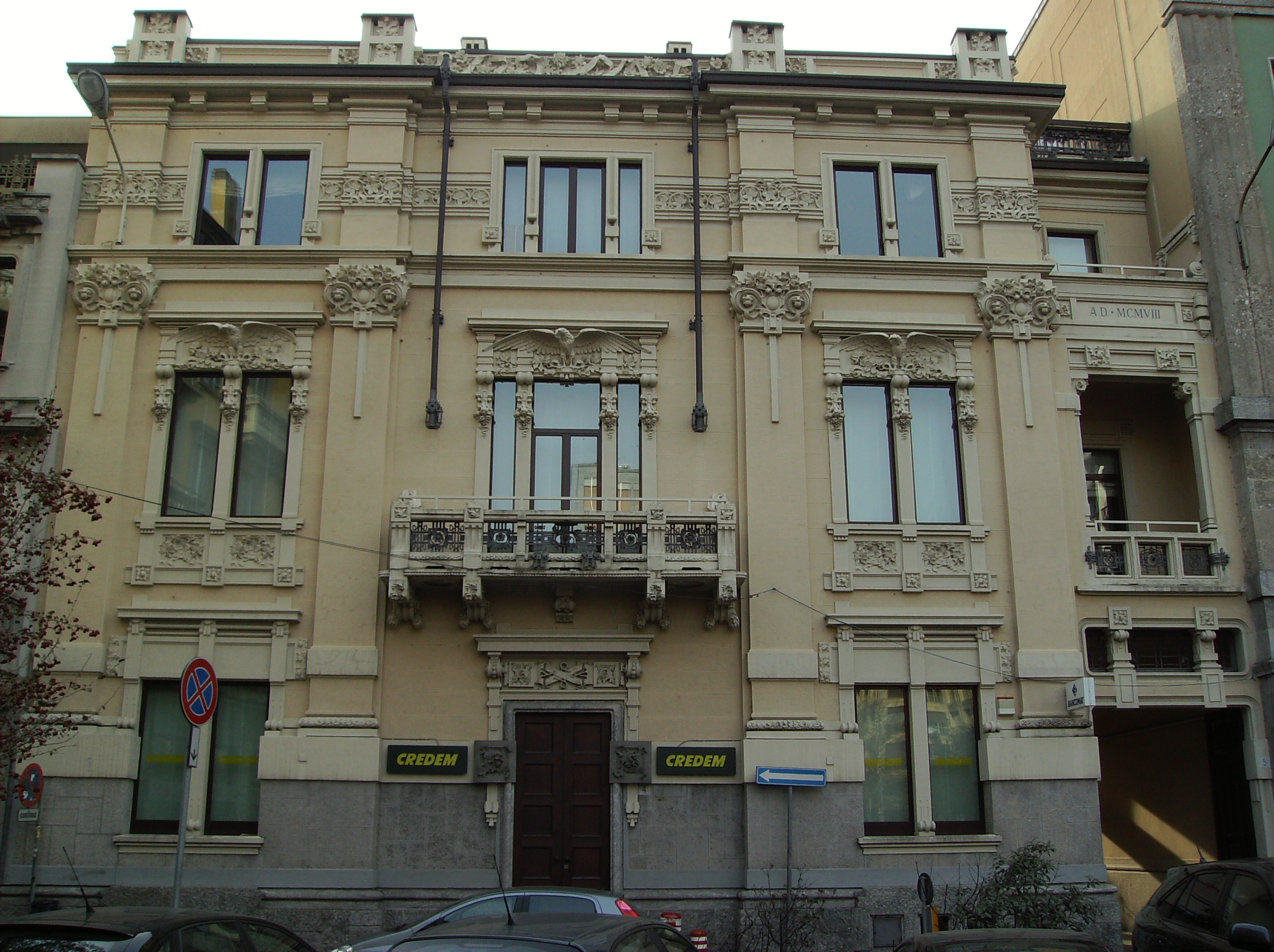
Casa Castiglioni

It is an Art Nouveau building located in Garibaldi Square and designed by architect Silvio Gambini in 1907. It is a three-story building. The facade has four lesenes that define three blocks vertically: a central, wider one where the entrance is located and two lateral blocks that are symmetrical to each other. There is also a fourth block located on the right side of the facade that connects the inner courtyard to the square in front.

The entire facade is richly decorated with plant figures: fruit bunches, chestnut leaves, horse chestnut branches, eagles in the window cymatiums, and ribbons. These Art Nouveau decorations are inspired by those of the Palazzo Castiglioni in Milan, the work of Giuseppe Sommaruga, with whom Gambini formed close ties. Complementing the decorative layout of the facade are fine wrought irons made by Alessandro Mazzucotelli in the parapets of the central balcony and the loggia of the side block, as well as in the interior gate.

On the facade, the second floor is visually separated from the first by a projecting linear stringcourse band, while a second band decorated with relief elements depicting natural elements and ribbons runs between the second-floor windows. The roof is concealed by a parapet interspersed with pilasters that sit above the four lesenes.

== Industrial archaeology ==
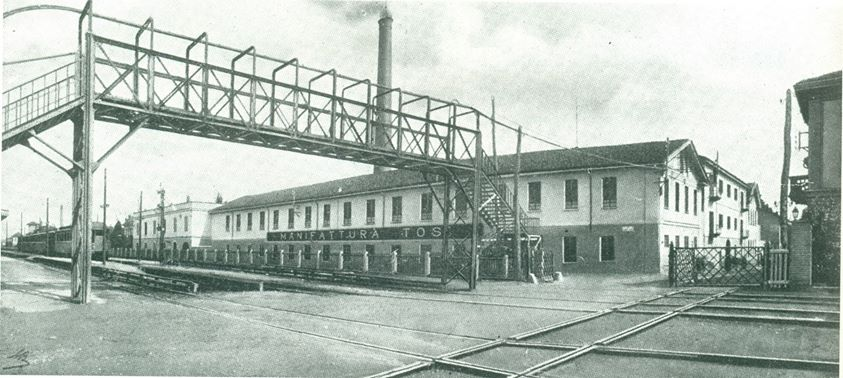
Manifattura Tosi, near the intersection of the Domodossola-Milan railway and the Milan-Gallarate tramway

As a result of industrial development since the mid-nineteenth century, Busto Arsizio retains a number of disused historic industrial buildings of interest to industrial archaeology, for which plans have been initiated to restore them:

- Busto Cotton Mill (founded in 1887 and closed in 1978), purchased by the municipality in 1980 and now the Busto Arsizio Museum of Textiles and Industrial Tradition
- Borri shoe factory (founded in 1892, purchased by the municipality in 2001 and awaiting a recovery project).
- Molini Marzoli Massari (built in the period 1906-1926 in Art Nouveau style, with sober floral decorations, by architect Silvio Gambini for the Società Anonima Molini Marzoli Massari). It was a large wheat milling plant, designed for a potential of 500 quintals per day and facing the railroad before it was moved. The plant ceased operation in 1975, but was not demolished because of its historical and artistic interest. It was purchased by the municipality in 1985, and since April 15, 2000, it has housed the municipal cultural center and the headquarters of the University of Insubria (for the health biology degree program of the Faculty of Mathematical, Physical and Natural Sciences).
- Giovanni Milani Cotton Mill (founded in 1870, built between 1880 and 1920s, closed in the 1960s and demolished in 2004) and on whose area a public park has been created that preserves the two chimneys and the portal.
- Lissoni & Castiglioni weaving mill, now used as a commercial facility.
- Ercole Bossi cotton mill (built before 1875), now ACLI headquarters.
- Crespi Lombardo-Veneto cotton mill (from 1914), now bank headquarters.
- Venzaghi cotton mill (1906), now divided into smaller companies.
- Enrico Candiani cotton mill (1907), home since 1970 to another manufacturing facility.

Other buildings, such as the Manifattura Tosi building located at the northeast corner of Viale della Gloria and Via XX Settembre, have been demolished.

=== Cotonificio Bustese ===
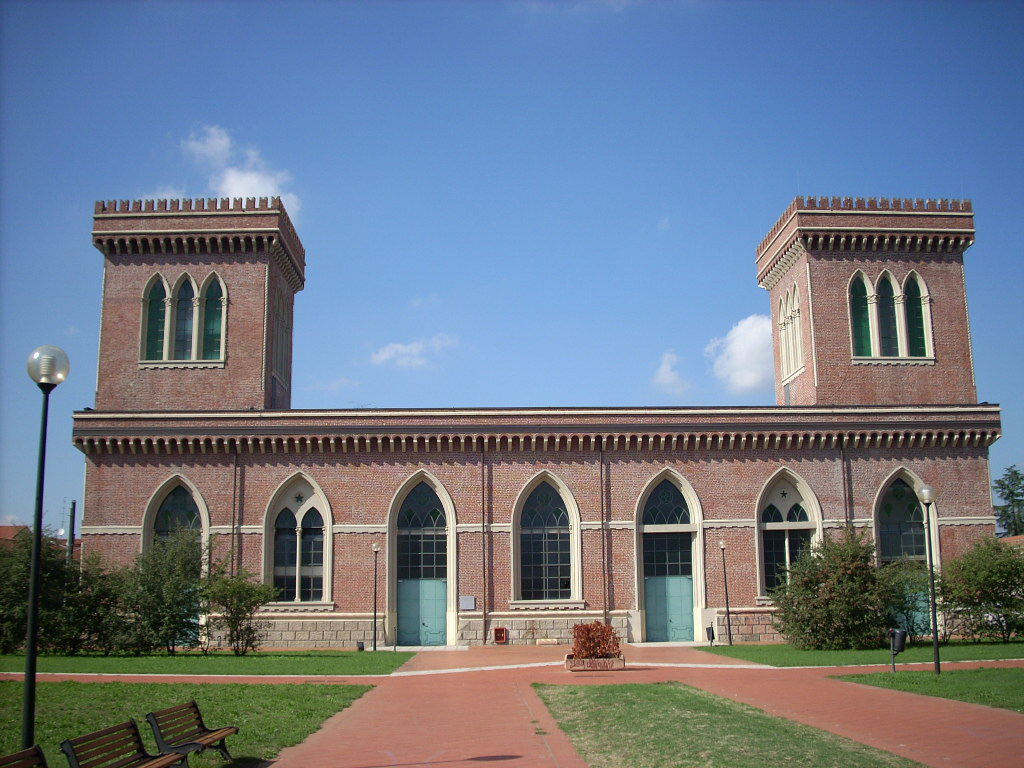
Cotonificio Bustese

The Museum of Textiles and Industrial Tradition, located just outside the historic center, was established on January 30, 1997, and has on display textile machinery and finished products (from traditional fibers to new synthetic fibers) from the period from the 19th century to the present.

The museum has been awarded the quality mark for its services by the Lombardy Region. The building in which the museum is set up was the site of the new spinning mill of Carlo Ottolini's former Bustese cotton mill, purchased by the municipality in 1980.

=== Molini Marzoli Massari ===
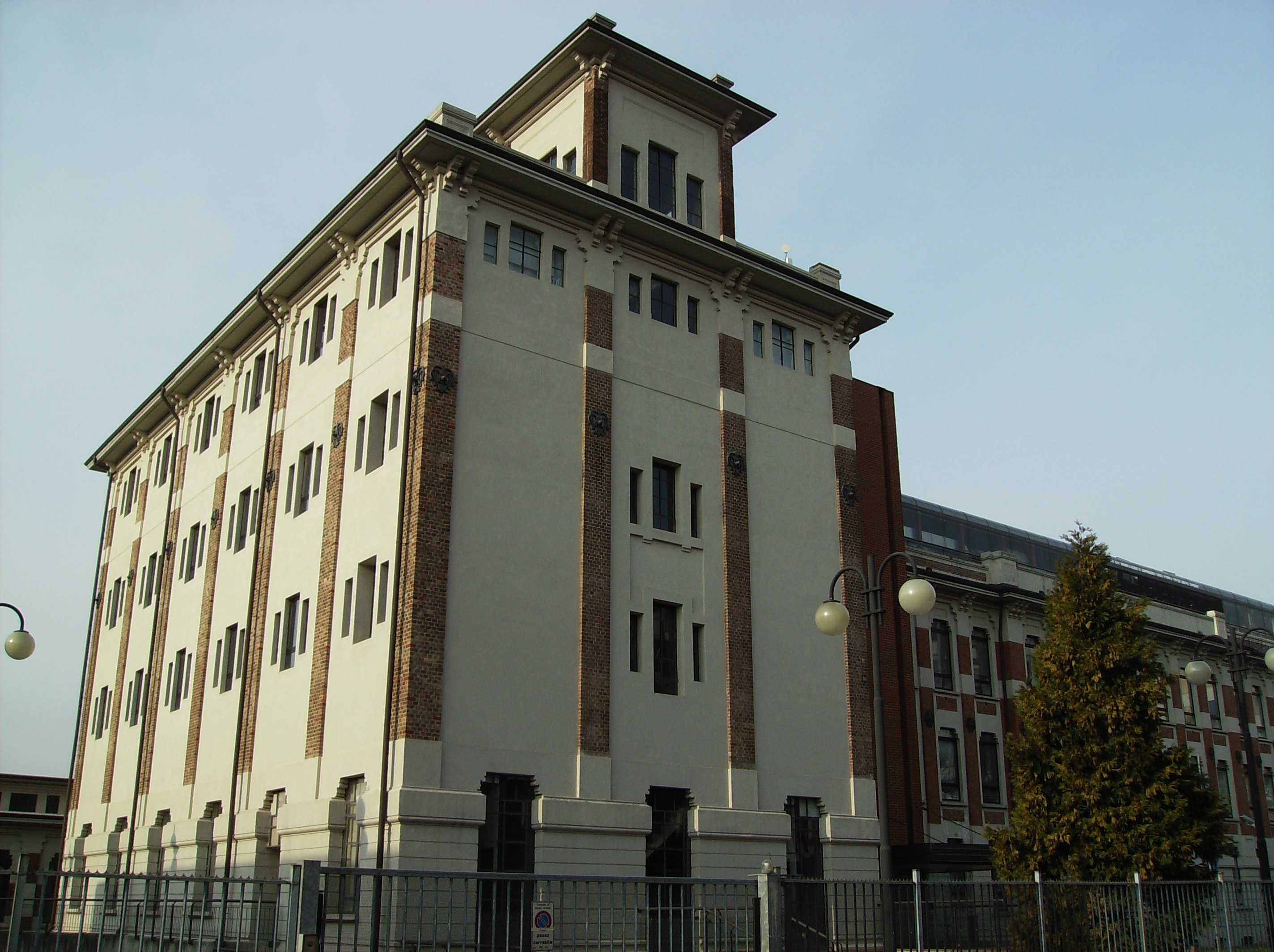
Molini Marzoli Massari

The Marzoli Massari mills, located along Viale Cadorna, in an area where the railway line once passed, date from 1906-1907, when they were built by engineer Guazzoni. Later, by the Busto architect Silvio Gambini, some of the buildings that made up the complex were demolished, others were modified and new ones were built in an Art Nouveau style typical of Gambini. Work ended in 1927, when this first and only wheat mill in Busto Arsizio went into operation.

The mill closed its doors in the 1960s, and in 1985 the complex was purchased by the Municipality of Busto Arsizio, which, after a restoration in 2000, established there the Lombard Science and Technology Pole, the Cotton Textile Center, a conference hall, various facilities for the Faculty of Biology of the University of Insubria and some municipal offices.

Today the complex is known as Tecnocity - Molini Marzoli Massari.

=== Calzaturificio Borri ===
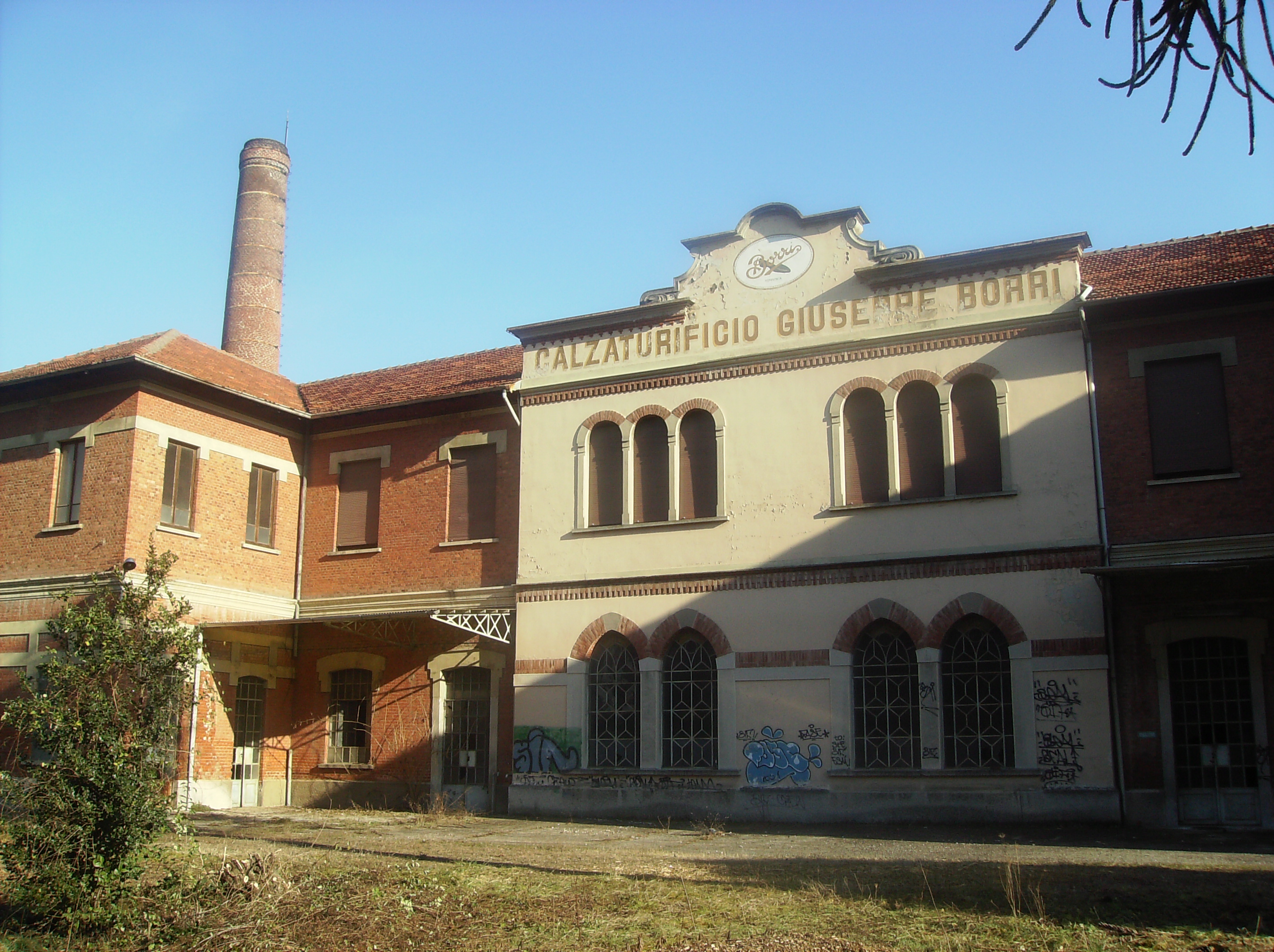
Calzaturificio Borri

The Calzaturificio Borri factory is located on Viale Duca d'Aosta. At the time of the construction of the shoe factory designed by architect Camillo Crespi Balbi, the avenue was the site of a section of the Domodossola-Milan railway, which allowed direct access to rail transport.

The building, which echoes the typical modes of Lombard architectural eclecticism of the early 20th century, has a symmetrical "C"-shaped plan and is made of exposed brick. Behind this body of the facade are the warehouses where the company's various stages of production took place. The offices were located in a villa outside the main building.

After the company closed in 1990, the building remained in a state of neglect. In 2001 it was purchased by the municipality of Busto Arsizio for the sum of 8 billion liras.

== Cinemas and theaters ==
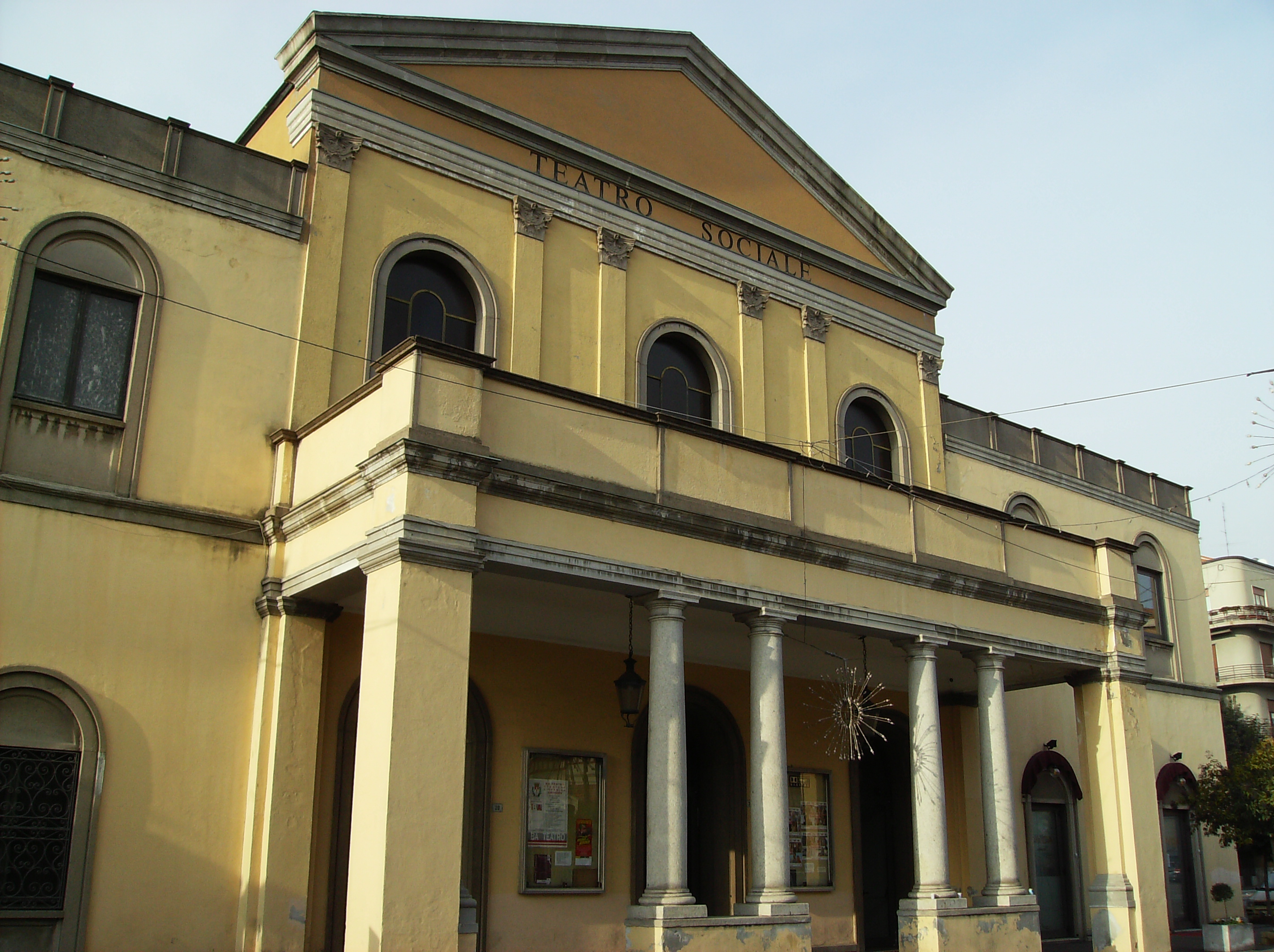
Cinema Teatro Sociale

The Teatro Sociale, the most historic theater in the city of Busto Arsizio, whose construction work ended in 1891, was erected by Countess Carolina Candiani in Durini to fulfill the last wishes of her father, the knight Giovanni Candiani. During the 1940s, on the initiative of the parish of San Michele Arcangelo, the Alessandro Manzoni theater was built, renovated in 1971 and brought up to standard in 1996. In 1948 was built, in the district of Sacconago, the Lux theater, intended to host a philodramatic company. The district of Borsano also has its own theater: the Aurora cinema, built in 1969 at the behest of the then parish priest Don Ferdinando Oleari. On the initiative of the parish of Sant'Edoardo, between 1951 and 1953, the San Giovanni Bosco cinema was built near the oratory, declared unfit for use in 1993 and reopened in 1998. It is one of the most active theaters in the city, both in the theatrical and film aspects with its historic film club, supported and animated by a close-knit group of volunteers. It has two stable companies, "Gli Antagonisti," operating in the comedy and experimental genre, and "L'Aquilone," operating mainly in the field of musicals. Opened in 1997, the Cinema Teatro Fratello Sole, at 1 Via Massimo D'Azeglio, is the last theater built in Busto Arsizio. The building that housed this last theater was erected to the design of engineers Leopoldo Candiani and Eugenio Villoresi and was inaugurated on November 24, 1898 as the "Catholic Associations Theater." After modifications in 1946 designed by engineer Prandina, the theater was opened again in 1947 under the name "Nuovo."

Among the closed cinemas, mention should be made of the Pozzi on Via Bramante (built in 1930 to a design by engineer Ettore Allemandi and closed in the 1980s) and the Oscar on Via Cavallotti (built in 1953-54 and closed in 2006), which shared the largest box office after World War II and managed to hold their own against competition from television until the 1960s, but also the Cinema Italia on Via Ugo Foscolo, the Cinema Castelli on Via Milano, and the Cinema Mignon (built in 1898 under the name "Teatro delle Associazioni Cattoliche" by engineers Leopoldo Candiani and Eugenio Villoresi, profoundly modified in 1946 by engineer Prandina and renamed "Cinema Nuovo").

== Farmsteads ==
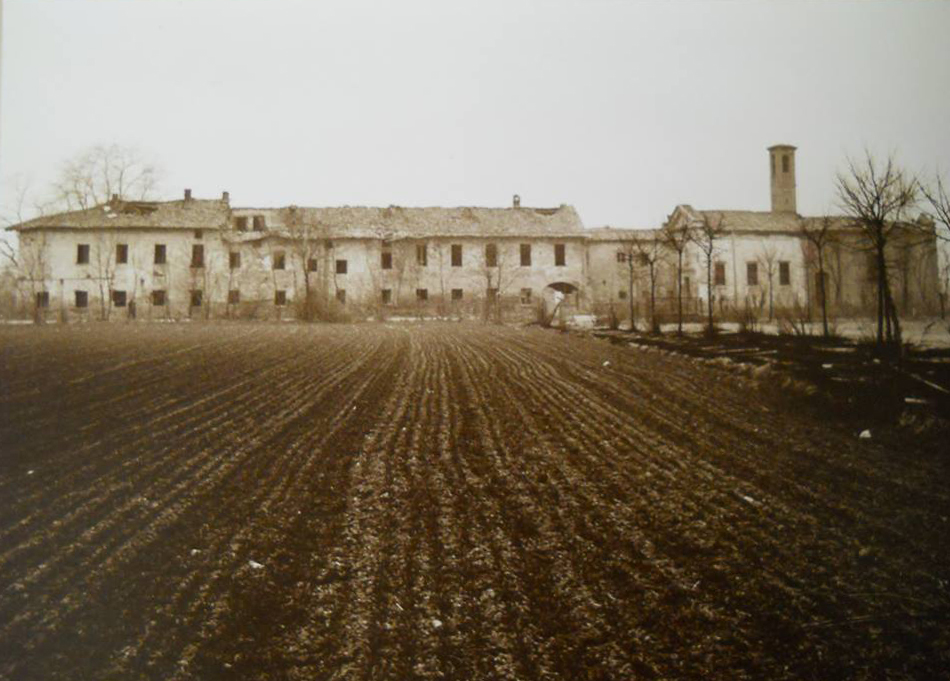
Cascina dei Poveri

In the history of Busto Arsizio, agricultural activity has played a secondary role due to the low productivity of the land and its permeability. Since the early 18th century most of the land was owned by large landowners who left the management of the land to farmers. Next to these large estates were the smallholders whose lands, usually less productive, bore little fruit, so much so that peasants were forced to supplement their earnings by working for the larger landowners or working on the loom. There were, however, widely present in the area farmsteads that today appear mostly abandoned: these were modestly sized buildings with a courtyard, a barn, a porch for sheltering wagons and tools, a stable, a granary, and the living quarters of the farmer's family and/or his workers. An exception, due to its complexity, is the Cascina dei Poveri, located in the northernmost area of the municipality.

Among the other farmsteads (there are a total of 113), some of which are still inhabited or converted into farmhouses, the main ones are Cascina Burattana, Cascina Borghetto, Cascina Favana (pre-1772), Cascina Formaggiana, Cascina Malavita (later Ama la Vita), Cascina Speranza (pre-1857) and Cascina Calcaterra, post-1920.

== Squares and streets ==
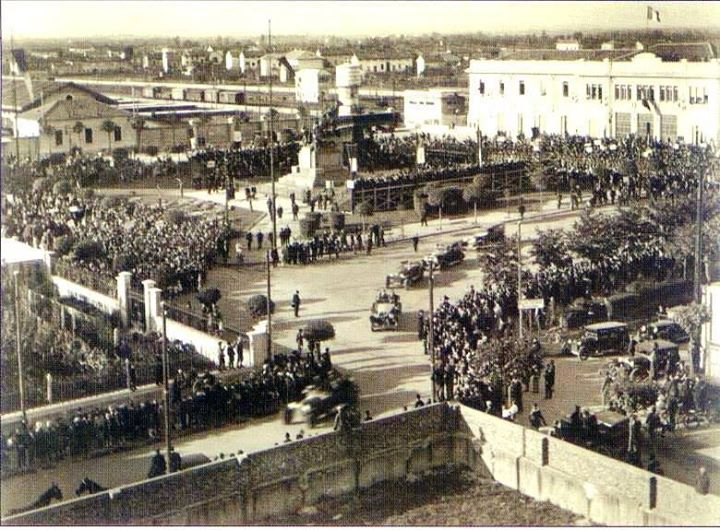
Piazza Volontari della Libertà

With the phrase "squares are par excellence the birthplace and gathering place of Western civilization," the then councillor for Public Works, Claudio Fantinati, inaugurated in 2004 the new décor of Piazza Toselli in the Borsano district.

Historically, there are three main squares that were located within the town of Busto Arsizio: the oldest and most important one, of St. Mary's, which is overlooked by the valuable Busto basilica; the square of St. John the Baptist (which arose in the area of the old cemetery); and the one today dedicated to Victor Emmanuel II, in front of the then home of the counts of Busto Arsizio, the Marliani-Cicogna Palace.

To these, it is possible to add the two main squares of the former autonomous municipalities of Sacconago and Borsano, now southern districts of Busto Arsizio, which are respectively the Church Square (together with the adjoining Carlo Noè Square) and Gallarini Square (overlooked by the district's parish church).

After the industrial revolution, when the expansion of the city beyond the boundaries of the old suburb began, some of the lawns in front of the embankment that surrounded Busto Arsizio were transformed into squares. This is the case with Piazza San Michele (the old meadow on which the church of Madonna in Prato was built), Piazza Manzoni, Piazza Garibaldi (meadow of Porta Basilica), and Piazza Trento e Trieste.

More recently, Piazza Volontari della Libertà, which houses the new Ferrovie dello Stato (State Railways) station after the old location was moved to the current Viale duca d'Aosta, has also gained importance.

=== Piazza Santa Maria ===
This is the city's most important and central square, in which converged the four contrade into which the ancient town of Busto Arsizio was divided. On the north side of the square are the sanctuary of Santa Maria di Piazza, the 14th-century church of St. Anthony Abbot and their shared bell tower. A pool for watering animals was also located in the center of the square. South of the square was the Beccaria, where animals were slaughtered. The building, probably from the late Middle Ages, jutted out toward the square and was entirely arcaded, as is also shown on the Teresian cadastre map. In the early nineteenth century this building was rebuilt and enlarged to make a theater, which opened in 1811. It was again demolished in 1933. On the other side of the incipient Via Bramante is the Rauli house, with its turret. Further south, the little Piazzetta Bramante (formerly Piazzetta Pretura) extended, from which the monastery of St. Mary Magdalene and St. Jerome was accessed. On the west side, the old Contrada del Mercato was widened and named Via Felice Cavallotti: with the opening of the Corso Europa, it connected Piazza Santa Maria with Piazza Manzoni. North of that street, where Arturo Tosi's birth house was located, the Santa Maria apartment building was built in the late 1960s, designed by Mario Bondioli and Ercole Lana.

=== Piazza San Giovanni ===
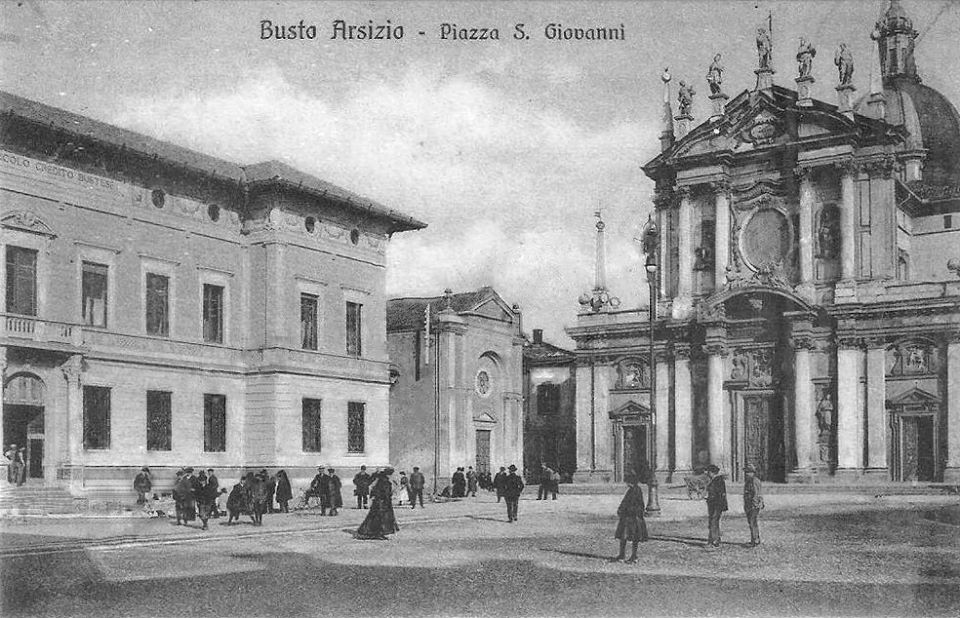
Piazza san Giovanni with the Basilica and the Piccolo Credito Bustese

It is one of three squares located in the historic center. It rises east of Santa Maria Square, to which it is connected by St. Anthony and Cavour Streets, which run parallel to each other. The eastern side of the square is entirely occupied by the Basilica of St. John the Baptist. Between the Basilica and Tettamanti Street is the Baptistery of San Filippo Neri. On the other side of Via Tettamanti faces what was once the Piccolo Credito Bustese, which occupies almost the entire northern side of the square, reaching as far as Via Solferino. Construction began in 1909 and ended the following year. On the other sides stand historic buildings, some of which were restored in the 2000s, such as Palazzo Volonterio, which is located on the southern side. The square is connected to three other important city squares: Via Milano connects it to Piazza Garibaldi, Via Tettamanti Monsignor Giuseppe to Piazza Vittorio Emanuele II, and Via Cavour and Via Sant'Antonio connect it to Piazza Santa Maria. Toward the south, where the Rauli alley once stood, Cardinal Tosi street was opened.

=== Piazza Vittorio Emanuele II ===
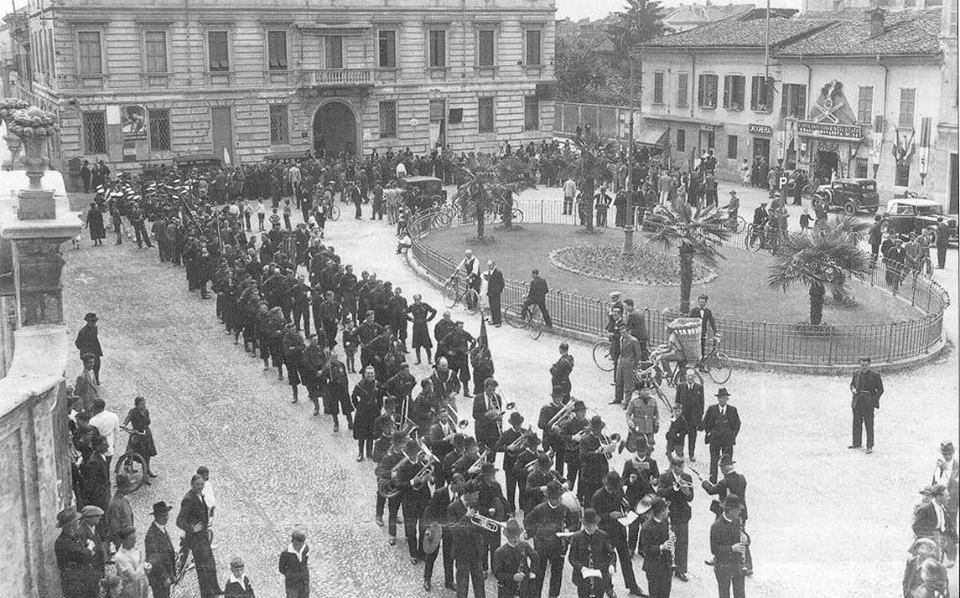
Piazza Vittorio Emanuele II

It is the square that stood in front of Palazzo Marliani-Cicogna, feudal lords of the County of Busto Arsizio. Formerly it was called Piazza Giustizia and even earlier Piazza del Conte. It was connected to the town by two roads that led, the first, to Piazza San Giovanni and the Basega (basilica) district, and the second to the Gate of the Three Kings and the Pessina (pool) and Sciornago districts. In 1861, Via Pozzi was opened, heading to today's Piazza Garibaldi. In 1899, following the construction of the Carducci schools (now the Daniele Crespi classical high school), a new street parallel to Via Pozzi was made to lead to the Piazza del Conte, which in the meantime had assumed its present name. For a number of years the square hosted the war memorial created by sculptor Enrico Manfrini, before it was moved to Piazza Trento e Trieste. Piazza Vittorio Emanuele II is overlooked by the municipal library and the Civic Art Collections, both of which occupy some of the spaces of Palazzo Marliani-Cicogna, as well as a number of residences that in some cases date back to the 18th century. On the southern side of the square, in an area that extends to Via Solferino, nine apartment buildings with apartments and stores are under construction.

=== Piazza San Michele ===
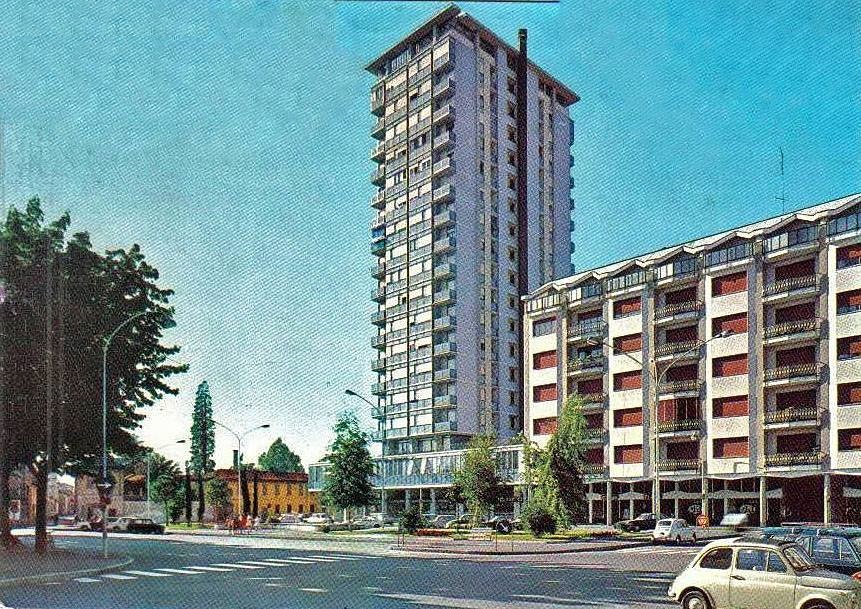
Piazza San Michele

This is the square located on the northwestern edge of the historic center, where a Lombard fortification that defended the old village once stood. It is overlooked on the southern side by the Priory Church of San Michele Arcangelo and on the northern side by the town's tallest palace, built in the early 1960s on the land where the estate of the Durini counts once stood. The square underwent major redevelopment in the last years of the last century: the central island was joined to the parish site, allowing cars to circulate no longer as in a traffic circle, but only between the pedestrian area and the high-rise building. The fountain was also completely redone. Not far from the apartment building, in what was the meadow that extended outside the embankment that occupied the square, right in the middle of the two roads that connected Busto Arsizio with Gallarate and Verghera, stands the Church of Madonna in Prato. A few meters from the square stands the park of the Museum of Textiles and Industrial Tradition of Busto Arsizio. Piazza san Michele is contiguous with Piazza Manzoni and Piazzetta Don Pio Chieppi, which is overlooked by the San Michele Arcangelo Museum of Sacred Art.

=== Piazza Manzoni ===
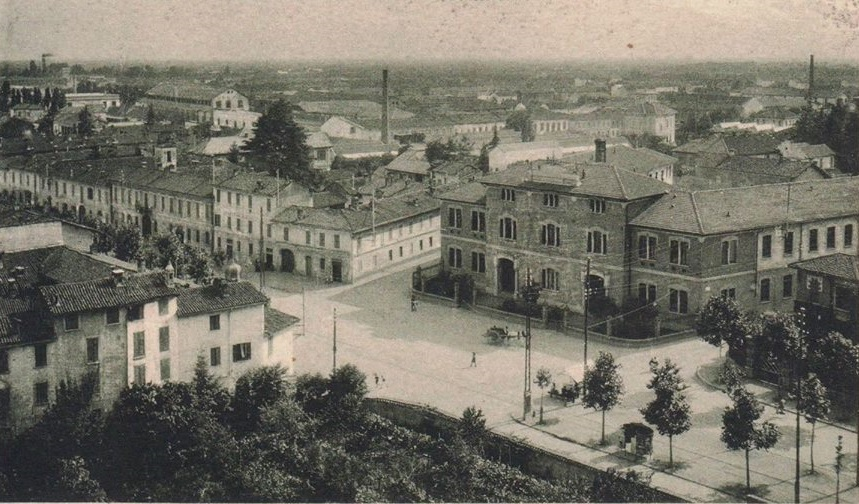
Manzoni Square as seen from the bell tower of San Michele

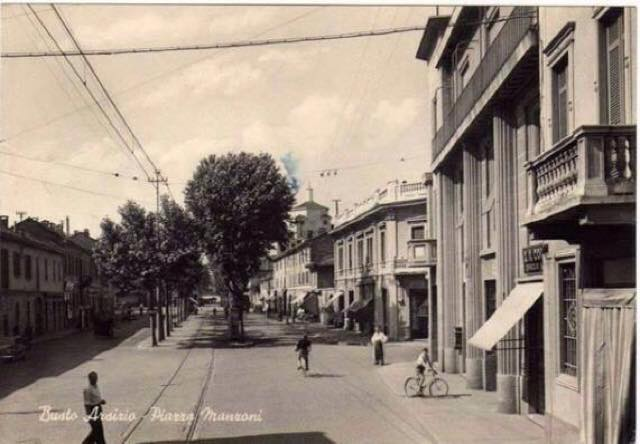
Manzoni Square with the Milan-Gallarate Tramway

It is an elongated square, open to vehicular traffic, along which some noteworthy buildings face each other. These include, firstly, Villa Pozzi, which now houses the Guardia di Finanza barracks, built in 1905 by architect Silvio Gambini for Pasquale Pozzi's son, Ercole, owner of a Busto manufacturing industry as well as the first president of the Piccolo Credito Bustese, who would live there with his wife Carolina Bellingardi and their four children. Secondly, the 1903 Manzoni Schools, by architect Camillo Crespi Balbi, and the apse of the church of San Michele Arcangelo are worth mentioning. Two of the four city gates, Pessina (at present-day Via Giacomo Matteotti) and Savico (at present-day Via Giuseppe Lualdi), were located on the square, which was formerly called Piazza della Fiera. Until 1951 the Milan-Gallarate tramway ran through the center of the square. In the past, today's Piazza Manzoni housed the moat that surrounded the walls of the town of Busto Arsizio, filled with water from the detour of the Tenore stream. In the southern part of the square stood a farmstead, the Ciama, from which a fresco, the work of an unknown artist and dating from the 18th century, was detached in 1966 to be preserved in Palazzo Marliani-Cicogna.

=== Piazza Garibaldi ===
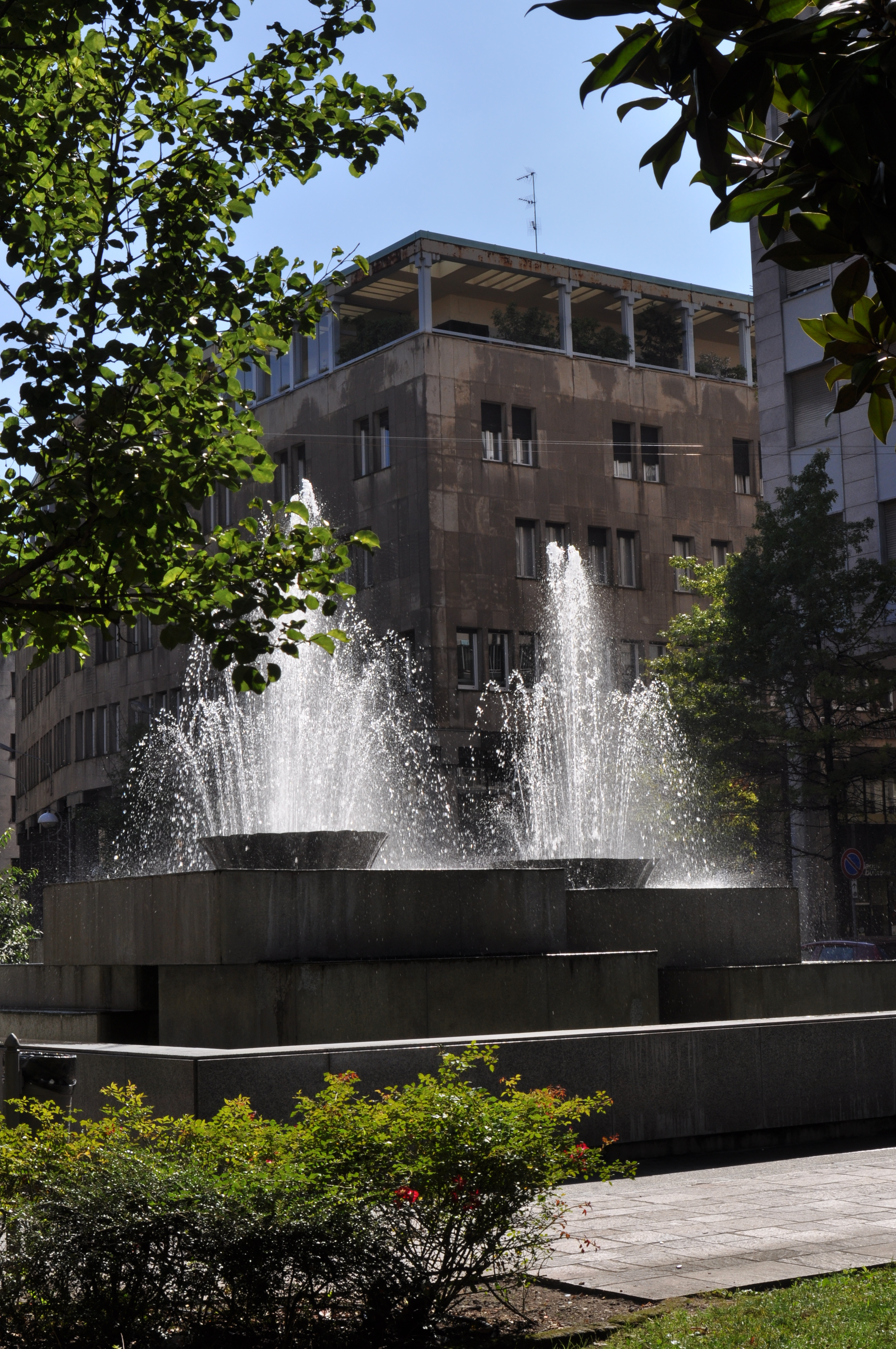
The fountain in Garibaldi Square. In the background is the building where the Rena house once stood.

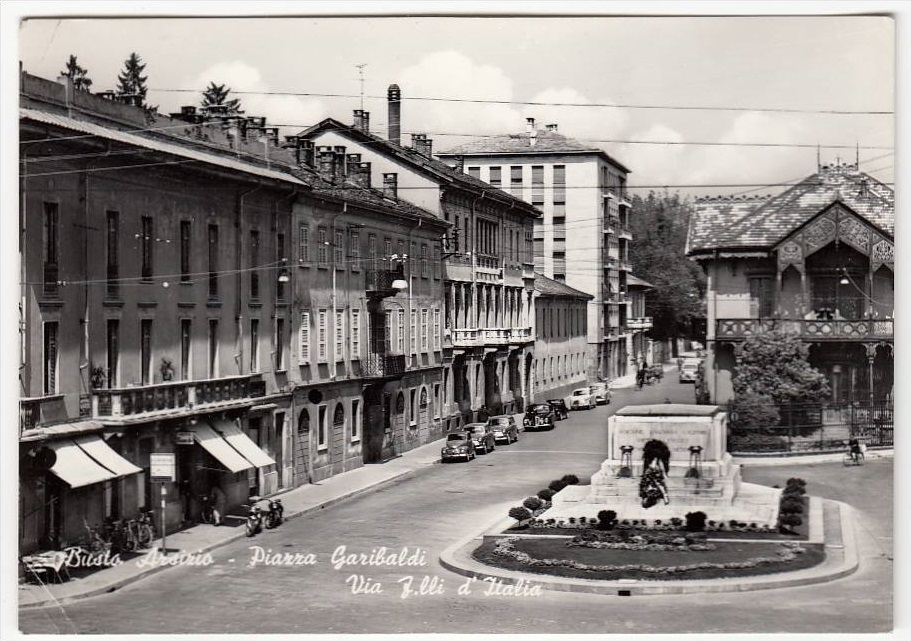
Garibaldi Square with the Stoppa bar in the foreground on the left and the Candiani house on the right

It is located just outside the eastern limits of the old town, occupying what was once the meadow of Porta Basilica. The square houses a fountain, created in 1966 by Busto sculptor Giuseppe Rebesco to celebrate the centenary of Busto Arsizio's elevation to city status. The fountain features three Alzo granite tiles depicting three typical Busto values: work, family and faith. On June 24, 2005, the day on which the city's patron saint, St. John the Baptist, is celebrated, the fountain was inaugurated after restoration work on it. These works were completed on the occasion of the 140th anniversary of the city's elevation. During these works, flower beds were also rearranged and spotlights were installed to illuminate the square at night, as well as surveillance cameras. In the past, instead of the fountain, the center of the square was occupied by the statue of the Winged Glory, created by the Milanese sculptor Orazio Costante Grossoni and inaugurated on June 21, 1927, in the presence of King Victor Emmanuel III. This monument lasted only 15 years, as its 60 quintals of bronze were melted down and used for war purposes. On the western side of the square, south of Via Milano, the Rena House, designed by Silvio Gambini, was built in 1906. After demolition, some of the ornaments were moved to Via Mameli, in the Alpini Park. Also on the western side but north of Via Milano, where the Quartiere degli Affari apartment building, designed by architect Paolo Candiani and built between 1955 and 1958, now stands, were two lower buildings. On the southern side of the square still stands the Castiglioni House. On the eastern side, to the south of Via Milano is the Marinoni building and to the north is the Candiani block, which existed as early as the mid-19th century and was renovated in 1898 by engineer Guazzoni. North of the square was the Candiani villa, later demolished. From this square starts Via XX Settembre, a continuation of Via Milano, in which the Gamba de Legn had its headquarters and which reaches as far as Corso Sempione in the Buon Gesù locality.

=== Piazza Trento e Trieste ===
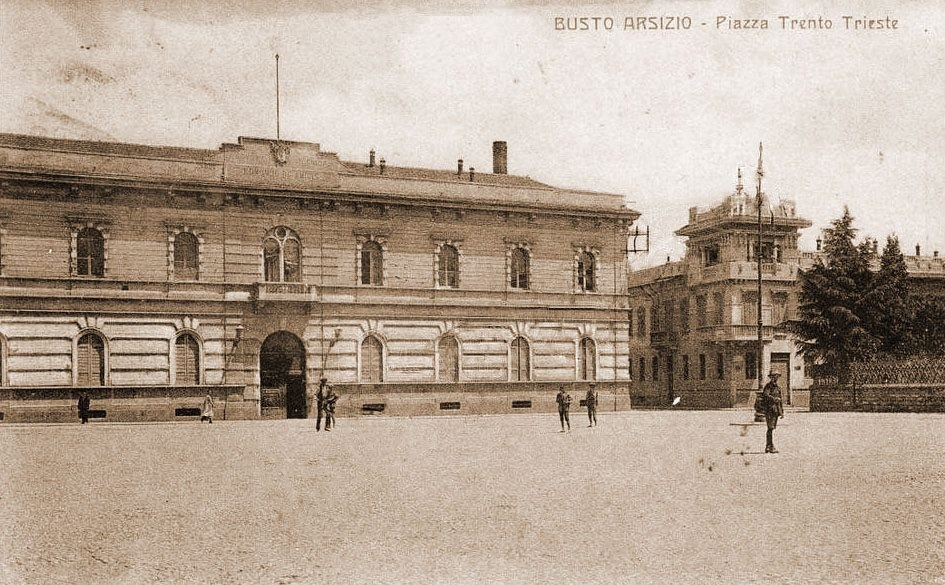
De Amicis schools, Edoardo Gabardi house and railing of the Tosi-Brunetto villa.

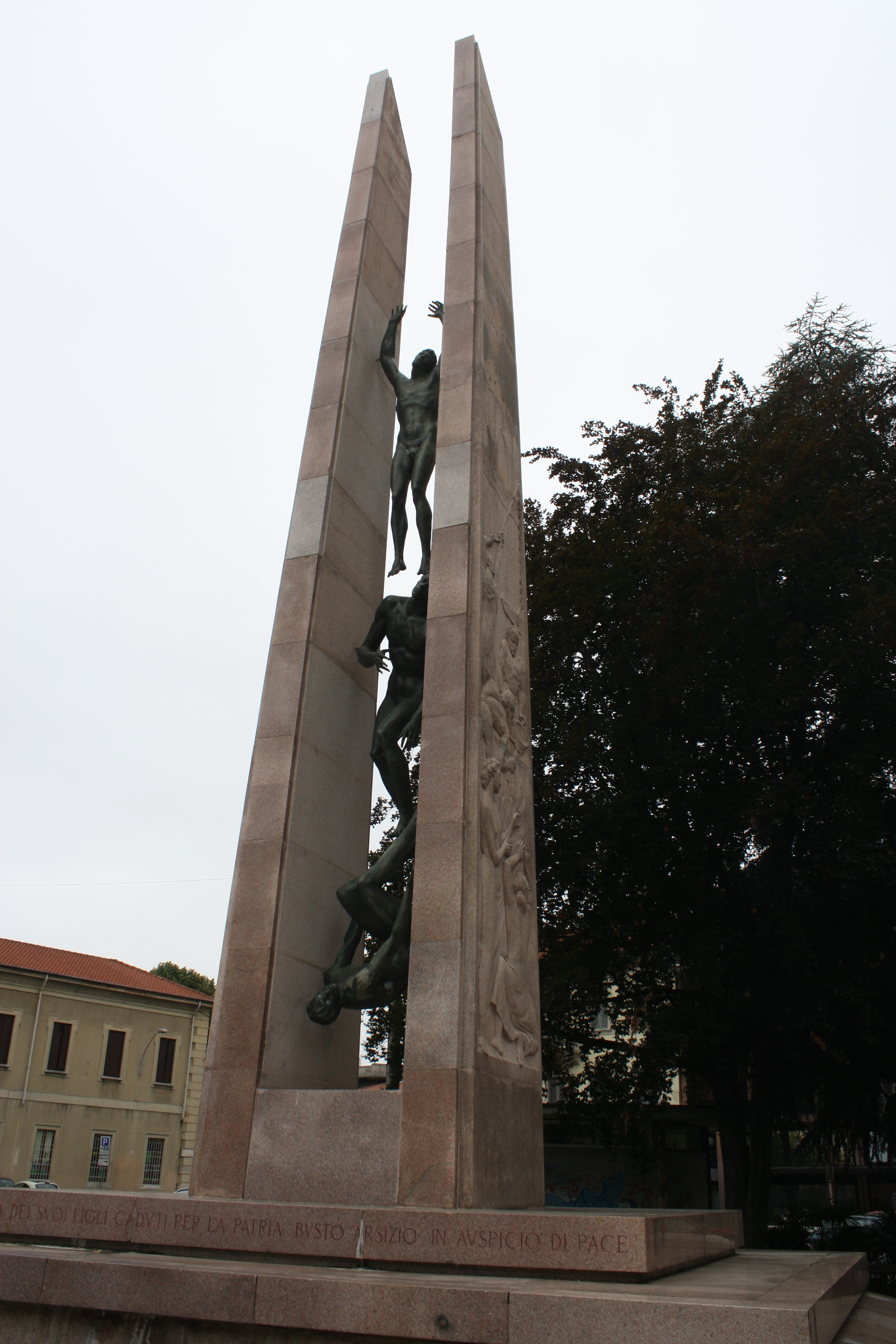
The war memorial placed today in Trento and Trieste square

As can be seen in the Teresian Cadastre, the present square corresponds to an area used as a meadow just outside the boundary of the old town, in the southeastern area, crossed diagonally by a road. Via Daniele Crespi connects this square with Piazza Garibaldi. After the construction of the Sant'Anna kindergarten in 1859, the present square was named "Prato dell'Asilo." In 1896 it was named after the Busto painter Giuseppe Bossi. It was then called Giosuè Carducci Square from 1907 to 1909, when it assumed its present name. Overlooking the area is the church of San Gregorio Magno in Camposanto, erected beginning in 1632. To the east are the former Edmondo de Amicis Schools, now the detached headquarters of the Daniele Crespi High School and former headquarters of the Black Brigade. There, in fact, many partisans were imprisoned and tortured, including Angioletto Castiglioni. In the southern part of the square once stood the Sciarina farmstead, demolished in the early 20th century to be replaced by the neo-Renaissance-style villa of businessman Alessandro Tosi, later inhabited by his daughter and her husband, Dr. Brunetto. The villa, designed by architect Camillo Crespi Balbi was demolished in the 1950s to build the present apartment building (which houses the Rebesco bookstore), designed by engineer Aldo Tosi, with the collaboration of Prof. Franco Poggi. In the corner of the square between the latter two buildings, Edoardo Gabardi's 1914 villa with its characteristic turret still stands. The Milan-Gallarate tramway crossed the square diagonally from Via Daniele Crespi to Via Mazzini. The War Memorial, which until 2010 stood in Piazza Vittorio Emanuele II, was moved to the central flowerbed in 2011. This monument, created in 1958 by artist Enrico Manfrini, consists of two concrete steles covered with pink granite slabs containing three falling naked men. On the outer side of the steles are carved, on the one hand, the ideals that led to the sacrifice and, on the other, the values of the city: family (represented by a mother with two children, one of whom is being breastfed), work, and faith (represented by the Sanctuary of Santa Maria di Piazza). At the base of the monument is the inscription:

To the glory of its sons / fallen for the fatherland / BUSTO ARSIZIO / in a wish for peace

=== Piazza Volontari della Libertà ===
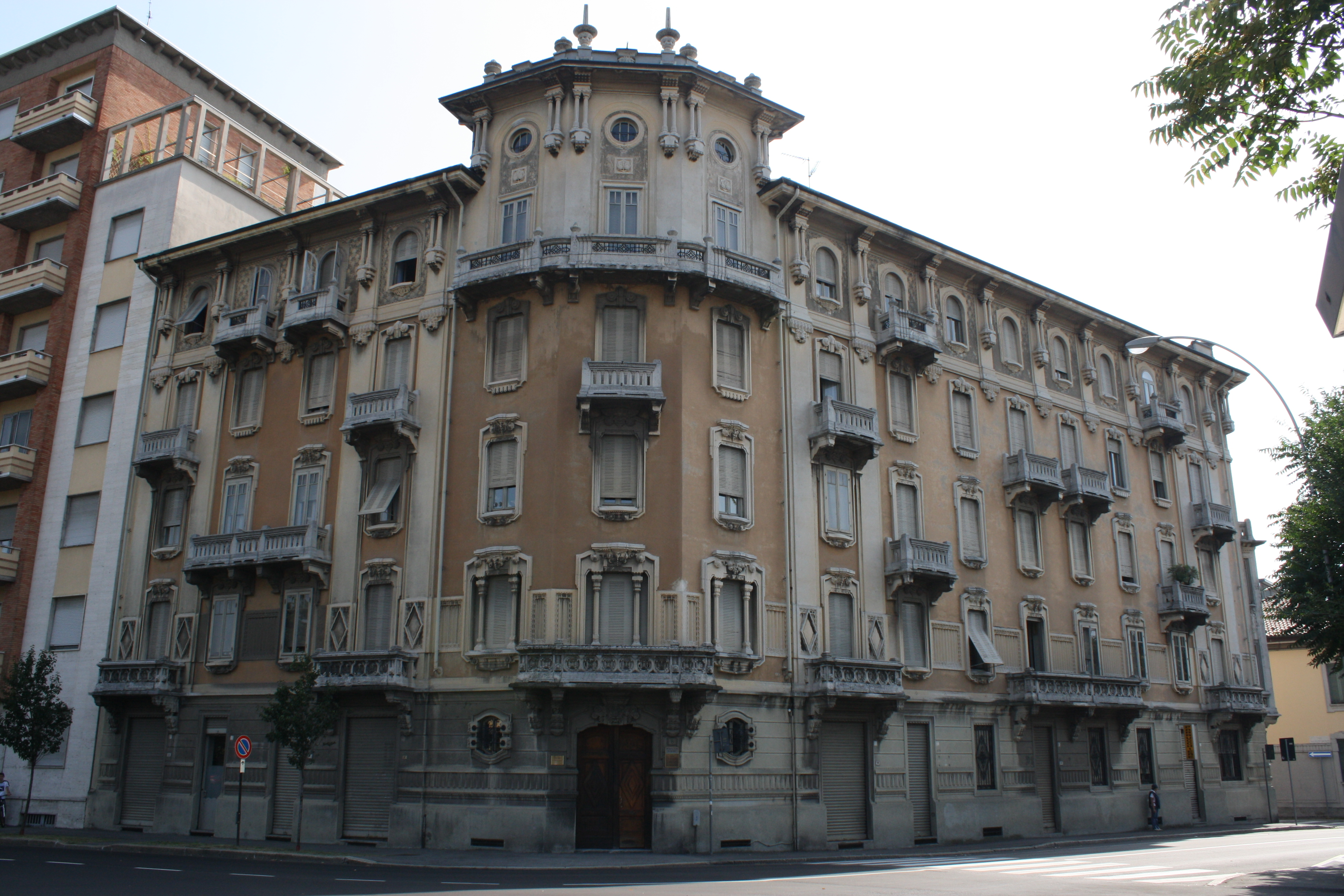
Palazzo Frangi, at the corner of Goffredo Mameli Street (right in the image) and Volunteers of Liberty Square

This is the square that welcomes commuters and travelers arriving in Busto Arsizio from the State Railways station, inaugurated by Benito Mussolini on October 26, 1924, which faces one side of the square. Opposite the station is an eight-story apartment building that stands on the area that was to have been occupied by the Frangi Palace, designed by architect Silvio Gambini, of which only the northwesternmost part, at the corner with Via Mameli, was built due to disputes between the owners of the land affected by the project. This building, dating from 1926, was intended to be the calling card for people getting off the train and, exiting the station, finding themselves in Piazza Volontari della Libertà. The house was erected in the neo-eclectic style, carefully maintained in the ornaments and wrought irons of the ground-floor windows and top-floor balconies. In the center of the square is the bronze and granite equestrian monument dedicated to Enrico dell'Acqua, a Busto industrialist who pioneered cotton exports to Latin America, created by Enrico Saroldi and Amedeo Fontana. Surrounding the central figure depicting Enrico dell'Acqua on horseback is a group of bronze statues symbolizing the Textile Industry, Trade, Production, the Lookout and the New Dawn. The granite block plinth measures 14.7 m × 14.3 m, while the total height of the monument is 9.3 m (4.8 m plinth and 4.5 m bronze statue). Through the Enrico dell'Acqua association and the intervention of the province of Varese at the time chaired by Marco Reguzzoni from Busto, the statue and plinth were restored in 2007.

=== Viale della Gloria ===
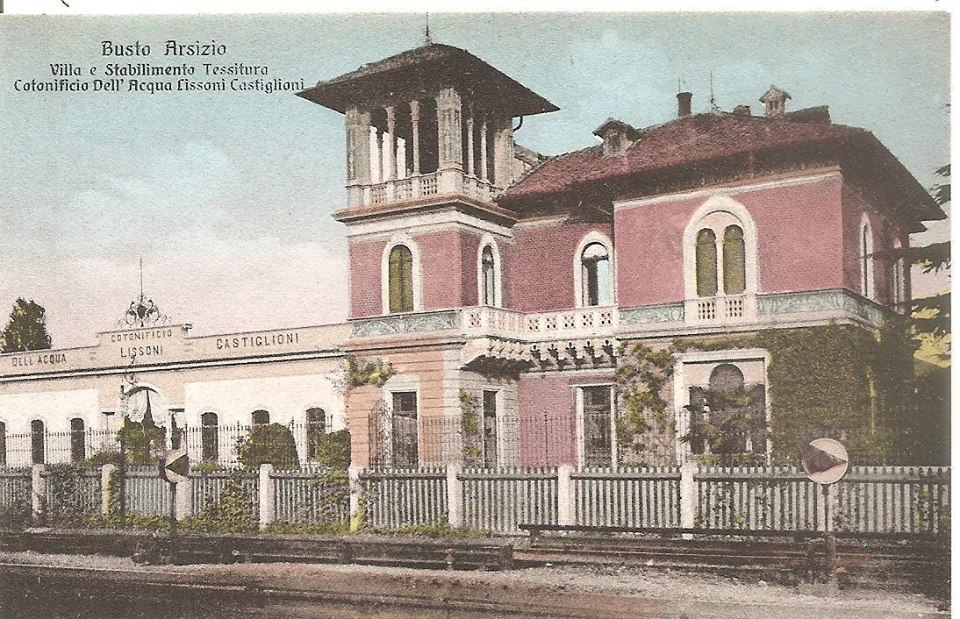
The tracks and villa of the Dell'Acqua-Lissoni-Castiglioni Cotton Mill overlooking the then Via G. Verdi, which also became Viale della Gloria

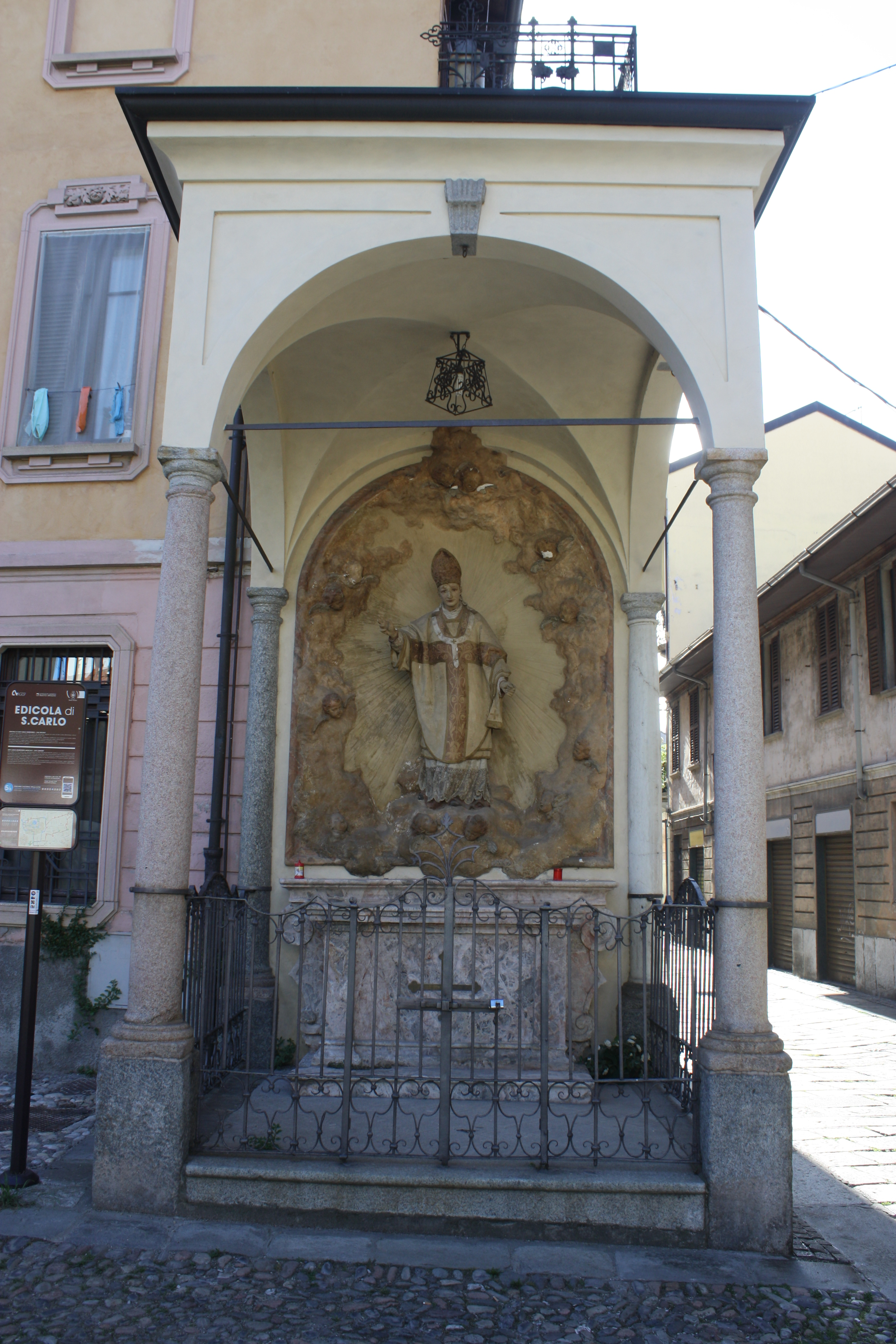
San Carlo wayside shrine in Matteotti street

Currently named (depending on the section) after Armando Diaz, the Duke of Aosta, Luigi Cadorna and Giuseppe Borri, it was the avenue that ran from the Cinque Ponti area to the southeastern border with Castellanza. From 1860 to 1924 the avenue was the site of the Domodossola-Milan railway line.

=== Via Mameli ===
This street connects Piazza Garibaldi, east of the city center, with Piazza Volontari della Libertà, where the FF.SS. station is located. Until the 1920s it was called by its dialectal name, strà Garotola (from garro, stony riverbed). It started from the meadow of Porta Basilica together with the road to Olzate (Olgiate Olona), of which it was a detour at what is now Via Pisacane, and reached the bank of the Olona. It became the main axis of the city's expansion when the present station was built. Numerous villas stand today on Via Mameli, and where the most monumental of them, Villa Bossi-Gabardi, was located is the Parco degli Alpini.

=== Via Giacomo Matteotti ===
It was the road that ran through the old Pessina district from the Santa Maria square (where the large pool, from which the road takes its name, was located) to the ancient Pessina gate, to the west, overlooking what is now Manzoni Square. Several buildings from different eras stand on this street, such as the 18th-century Conventino (the name by which the Canavesi-Bossi house is better known) whose cellars date back to the 15th century. The shrine of St. Charles Borromeo and, on the corner with Via Ariberto, Biagio Bellotti's 18th-century fresco depicting Our Lady of Sorrows are also located here. In the 19th century it was named Corsia Ticino. From the last year of the century until 1944 it was called Via Principessa Elena when, for a short time it was Via Ettore Muti. In 1945 it assumed its present name.

== Natural areas ==
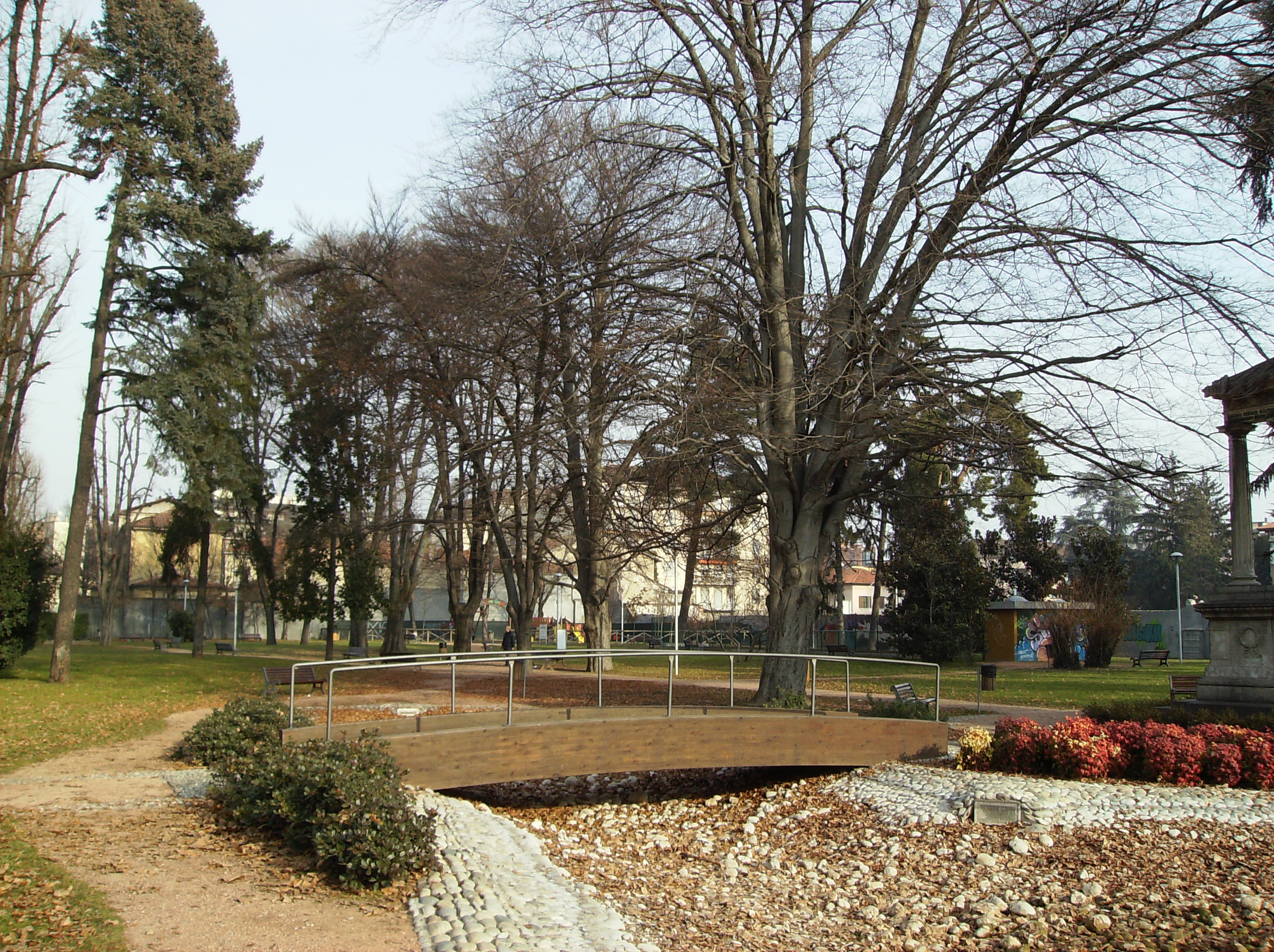
Ugo Foscolo Park

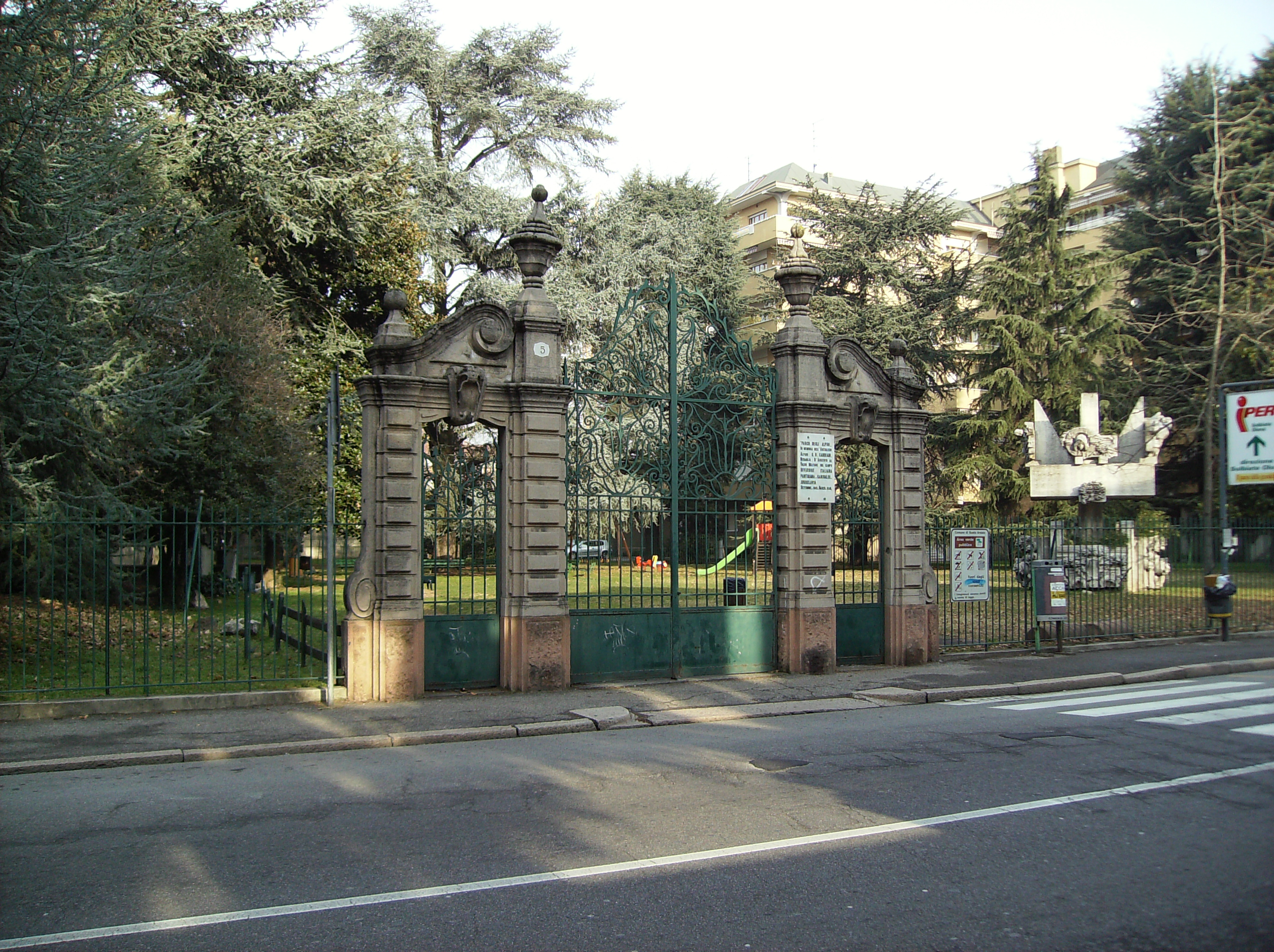
Parco degli Alpini

=== Parco Ugo Foscolo ===
It stands on the area once occupied by the old city cemetery, built when the former cemetery grounds of the churches of St. Michael and St. John had become insufficient. Inside the park is the monument to the veterans of the patriotic battles, inaugurated in 1909. Consisting of two Doric columns with a short entablature, it was designed by engineer Luigi Carlo Cornelli and made by sculptors Giulio Cassani and Enrico Sirtori.

=== Parco dell'Alto Milanese ===
The Alto Milanese Park, which covers the municipal territories of Castellanza and Legnano and the southern part of the one of Busto Arsizio, occupied by wooded and rural areas. The park protects local flora and fauna and traditional activities in agriculture and animal husbandry.

The park's headquarters is located in the Ottolini-Tosi villa in Busto Arsizio.

=== Parco degli Alpini ===
Alpini Park, located on Mameli Street, houses an Art Nouveau monument, made with decorative elements from Casa Rena, an Art Nouveau building in Garibaldi Square designed by Silvio Gambini (1906-1907). The entrance gate to the park is from the demolished Villa Bossi-Gabardi (built in 1925), which stood on the park area until the 1970s. This villa was built in 1925, by architect Duilio Torres and engineer Piero Tosi, with a facade developed on sloping planes and enriched by soft decorations, as well as by the rusticated light-colored stonework that covered much of the building.

=== Parco Comerio ===
Inaugurated in 2005, it stands in the area of the former Ercole Comerio factory in the San Michele district, adjacent to the Villa Comerio. Inside the park are a pond, a bar and an area with games for children. The factory located there was the site of a fascist raid on January 19, 1944. Seven workers were arrested, guilty of fomenting a strike. Only Melchiorre Comerio, brother of the company owner, would be released. The others would be deported to the Mauthausen concentration camp.

=== Parco per la Vita ===
Located in the San Giuseppe district, right in front of the church of the same name, is the Park for Life, otherwise known as Stelvio Avenue Park, because of its location. The other street bordering the park is Marmolada Street, which once formed the bed of the Tenore stream.

Every year, the traditional patronal festival of St. Joseph, organized by the "Friends of St. Joseph" association, takes place in that park. It consists of fifteen days of music, food, performances and prayers.

== See also ==
- Busto Arsizio

== Bibliography ==
- Cantù, C. (1857–61). Grande illustrazione del Regno Lombardo-Veneto. Ossia storia delle città, dei borghi, comuni, castelli, ecc. fino ai tempi moderni. Milano.
- Grampa, Bruno (1927). Pagine di storia e di vita bustese.
- Magni, C.; G. Pacciarotti (1977). Busto Arsizio - Ambiente storia società. Busto Arsizio: Freeman editrice.
- AA.VV. (1981). Sommario di vita bustese dalle origini ai tempi nostri. Azzate: L.V.G. editrice.
- Giampiero Magugliani, ed. (1985). Busto Arsizio. Storia di una città attraverso le sue vie e le sue piazze. Busto Arsizio: Pianezza s.r.l.
- Amici del Liceo (1989). Vita bustese. Rassegna di vita bustese, documenti ed immagini 1920-1940. Busto Arsizio: Bramante editrice.
- Bertolli-Pacciarotti-Spada (1991). Chiese minori a Busto Arsizio: San Gregorio e Beata Vergine delle Grazie (Sant'Anna). Busto Arsizio: Libreria della Basilica.
- Ferrario Mezzadri-Langè-Spiriti (1992). Il Palazzo Marliani Cicogna in Busto Arsizio. Busto Arsizio: Arti Grafiche Baratelli.
- Paredi, Angelo (1992). La Beata Giuliana da Busto Arsizio. Libreria della Basilica. Busto Arsizio.
- Adelio Bellotti; Achille Bernocchi, Luigi Riccardi (1997). Busto Arsizio in cartolina: I luoghi cari, 1895-1950. Azzate: Macchione.
- Augusto Spada; Alberto Grampa (1998). Busto Arsizio in cartolina: I luoghi della memoria, 1895-1950. Azzate: Macchione.
- AA.VV. (2001). La Basilica di San Giovanni Battista a Busto nell'opera di Francesco Maria Ricchino. Busto Arsizio: Freeman editrice.
- Gian Franco Ferrario (2002). Busto Arsizio. Emozioni Liberty. Busto Arsizio: Macchione editore.
- AA.VV. (2002). Molini Marzoli Massari. Un recupero di eccellenza. La Tecnocity di Busto Arsizio. Busto Arsizio: Macchione editore.
- Luigi Giavini (2002). Le origini di Busto Arsizio dai Liguri ai Longobardi. Nomos edizioni.
- AA.VV. (2004). Busto Arsizio, anno 1604 e dintorni. Busto Arsizio: Edizioni de "la Provvidenza".
- Augusto Spada (2004). Conoscere la città di/Getting to know the city of Busto Arsizio. Busto Arsizio: Freeman editrice.
- AA.VV. (2006). La chiesa di San Michele. Origine e storia, 2 voll. Busto Arsizio: Arti Grafiche Baratelli s.n.c.
