= Lualdi =

Lualdi is a surname. Notable people with the surname include:

- Adriano Lualdi (1885–1971), Italian composer and conductor
- Alessandro Lualdi (1858-1927), Italian Roman Catholic cardinal
- Antonella Lualdi (1931–2023), Italian actress and singer
- Edoardo Lualdi Gabardi (born 1931), Italian racing driver
- Valerio Lualdi (born 1951), Italian racing cyclist
