= Senago =

Senago Senagh (Lombard)
- Comune
- Comune di Senago
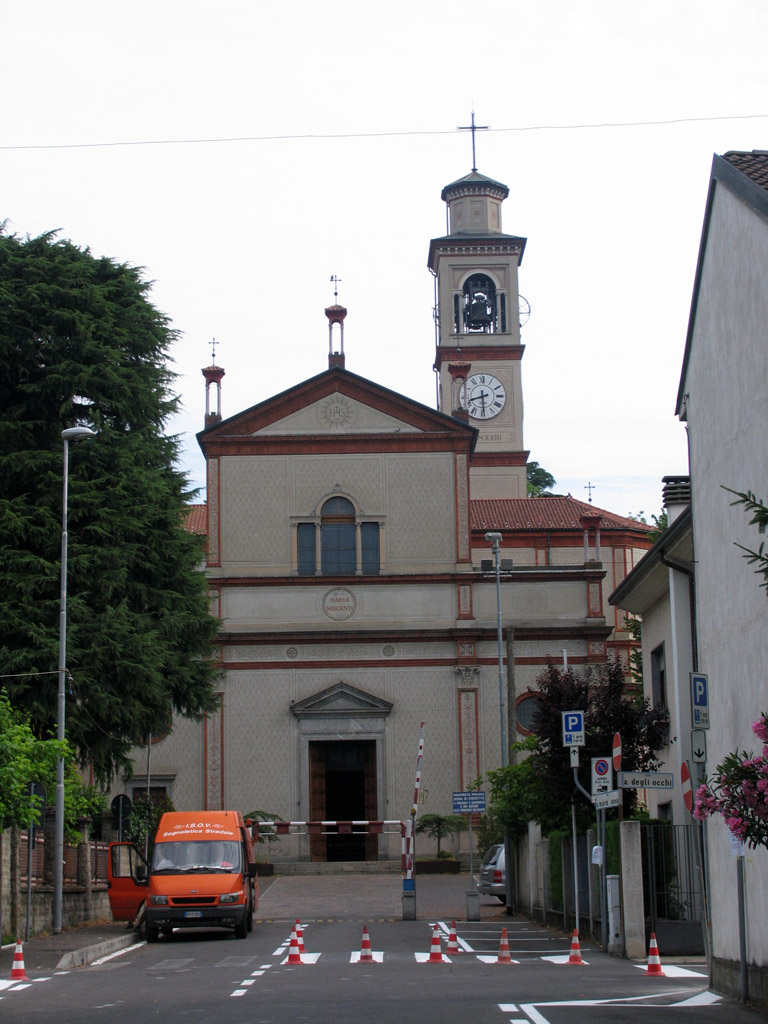

- Coat of arms

- Location within Italy Location within Lombardy
- Coordinates: 45°35′N 9°8′E
- Country: Italy
- Region: Lombardy
- Metropolitan city: Milan (MI)
- Frazioni: Castelletto, Senaghino, Traversagna, Villaggio Gaggiolo, Mascagni, Villaggio Papa Giovanni XXIII

Government
  - Mayor: Magda Beretta (LN)

Area
  - Total: 8.6 km^{2} (3.3 sq mi)
- Elevation: 176 m (577 ft)

Population (Dec. 2004)
  - Total: 21,527
  - Density: 2,500/km^{2} (6,500/sq mi)
- Demonym: Senaghesi
- Time zone: UTC+1 (CET)
  - Summer (DST): UTC+2 (CEST)
- Postal code: 20030
- Dialing code: 02
- Patron saint: St. Martin
- Saint day: 11 November
- Website: Official website

Senago (Lombard: Senagh [seˈnaːk]) is a comune (municipality) in the Metropolitan City of Milan in the Italian region Lombardy, located about 13 kilometres (8 mi) north of Milan. As of 30 November 2017, it had a population of 21,519 and an area of 8.6 square kilometres (3.3 mi^{2}).

Senago borders the following municipalities: Limbiate, Cesate, Paderno Dugnano, Garbagnate Milanese, Bollate.

The Villa San Carlo Borromeo is located in Senago. A historical residence, which was built in the XIV century, is immersed in a secular park of eleven hectares, 12 kilometres from Milan.

It is the home town of Don Ambrogio Gianotti, a partigiano and the first priest of the church of St. Edward, Busto Arsizio
