= Edoardo Gabardi =

Italian philanthropist and industrialist (1871–1962)

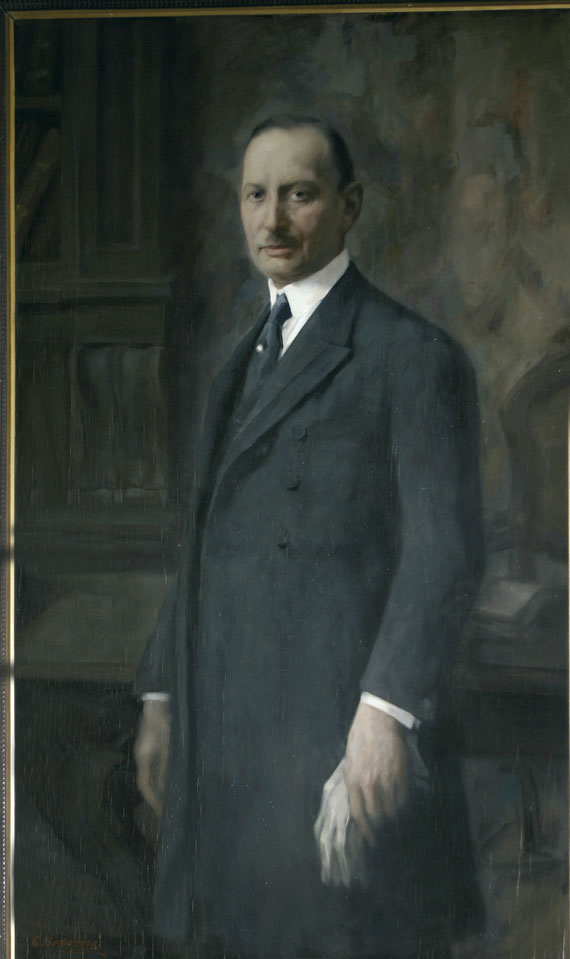
- Edoardo Gabardi
- Born: 1871; Busto Arsizio, Province of Milan, Kingdom of Italy
- Died: 1962 (aged 90-91); Busto Arsizio, Province of Varese, Italy
- Occupations: Businessman, industrialist, philanthropist.
- Spouse: Anna Anzini
- Children: Edvige, Este

Edoardo Gabardi (1871–1962) was an Italian textile industrialist and philanthropist from Busto Arsizio, Lombardy. He was a key figure in the economic development of the town and expanded the family's textile business. He became a prominent benefactor of the town, funding many institutions, such as the Hospital of Busto Arsizio and the construction of the Church of Sant'Edoardo.

== Early life ==
Edoardo Gabardi was born in 1871 in Busto Arsizio, Lombardy, the son of Giuseppe Gabardi and Camilla Gallazzi. His father had found luck entering the cotton-waste industry in 1866, establishing the family’s industrial activities. Taught by his father, Gabardi followed in his footsteps and ran the business. Gabardi's brother, Biagio Gabardi, was born in 1881. Biagio was a known benefactor and philanthropist, and a road was dedicated to him. His brother died on 17 August 1941 in Busto Arsizio. His elder brother, Pietro (1866–1919), was a priest and participated in the Catholic mission in Hong Kong.

== Career ==
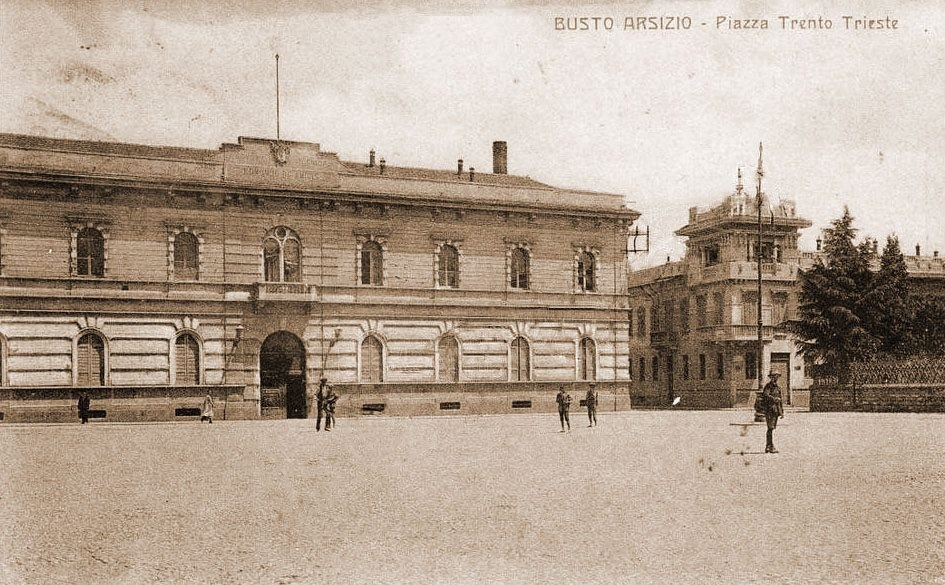
Piazza Trento Trieste in the 20th century, where Gabardi had his textile factory. On the right of the image you can see Gabardi’s house which still stands today.

After inheriting the family cotton business from his father, Gabardi quickly transformed the cotton-waste industry into a much more modernised business. He developed methods to recover, reuse, and process textile residues to produce secondary materials, such as absorbent cotton, increasing the value and efficiency of the low grade material. Gabardi served on the board and owned cotton mills outside of Busto Arsizio, specifically in Besnate, Romagnano Sesia, and in Ponte San Marco (frazione of Calcinato). Gabardi was a part of the municipal council of Busto Arsizio, and in 1942, became a Cavaliere del Lavoro.

== Philanthropy ==
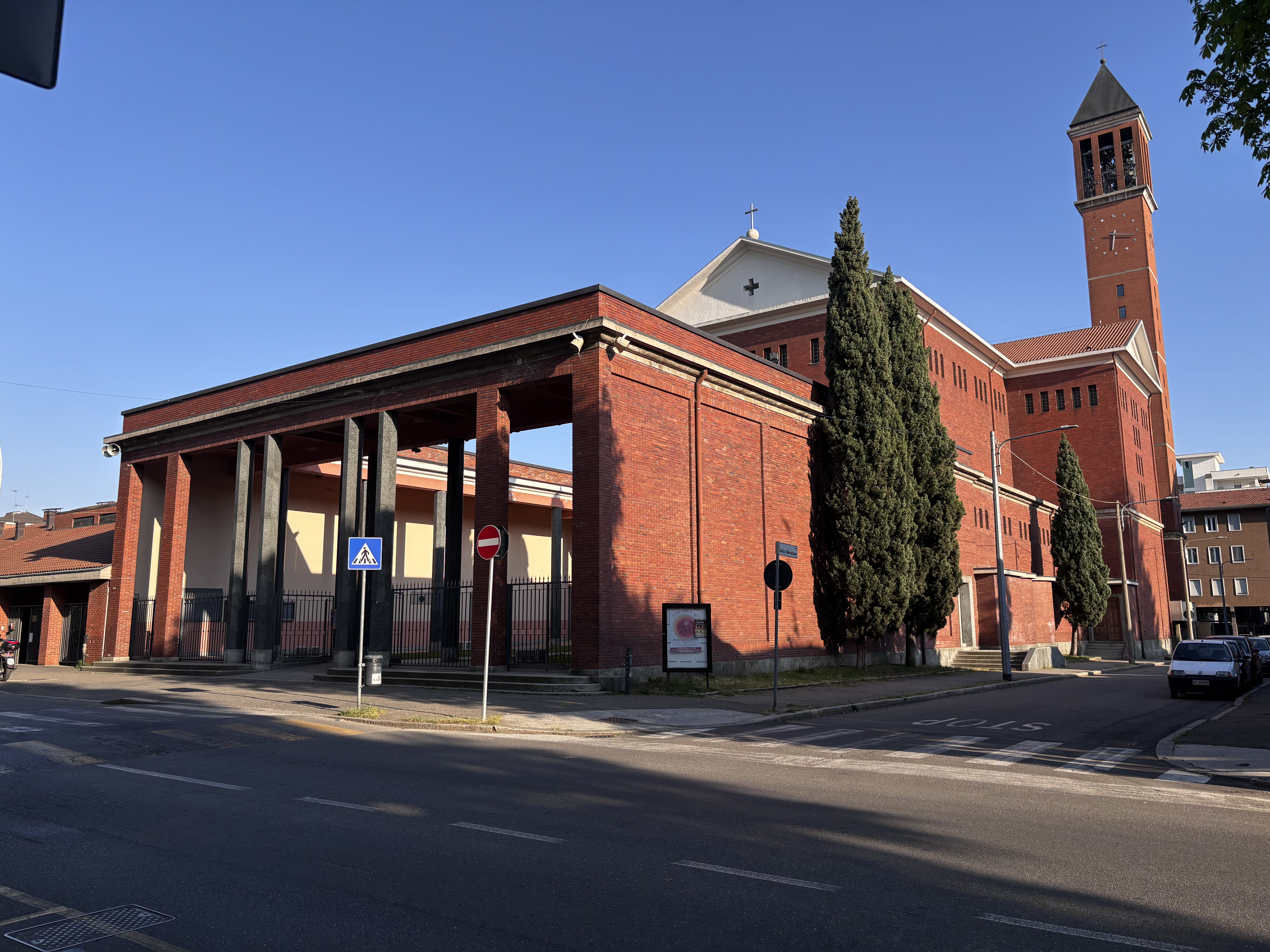
The Church of Sant’Edoardo, Busto Arsizio. Its construction was primarily funded by Gabardi

Gabardi was a well known and respected philanthropist in Busto Arsizio. His extensive philanthropic work earned him the Order of St. Sylvester, the Order of Saints Maurice and Lazarus, the Order of Merit for Labour, and was given the title of Nobil Homo (nobleman), by the House of Savoy. Gabardi significantly contributed to:

- The Hospital of Busto Arsizio; Gabardi was one of the major benefactors of the hospital, and as such a portrait of him hangs in the hospital.
- Various Social Welfare Institutions; Gabardi constructed and managed various social welfare institutions in Busto Arsizio. He also constructed the Colonie Estive for children in Busto Arsizio, located in Ceresola (frazione of Berbenno, Lombardy) and Loano (Liguria).

Gabardi also contributed significantly to the construction of the Church of Sant’Edoardo, Busto Arsizio. Built between 1938 and 1939, Gabardi was one of the major benefactors of the project. The church was dedicated in his honour (hence ‘Sant’Edoardo’) and a plaque was placed in the portico of the church, commemorating Gabardi. Edoardo Gabardi is remembered by the community during a Mass, which commemorates those instrumental to the existence of the church. The mosaic in the apse of the church is dedicated to Gabardi.

== Personal life ==
Gabardi was married to Anna Anzini (26 October 1866–3 December 1919), and had two children.

- Edvige Angela Giuseppina Gabardi (14 April 1902 – 14 August 1936), who married Angelo Battista Lualdi. They had a son, Edoardo Lualdi Gabardi (1931–2026) who became a well-known Italian racing driver. Edvige died in Baden bei Wien following a car crash coming back from the 1936 Summer Olympics.
- Este Bernardo Gabardi (27 November 1903 – 1 June 1912)

Gabardi died in 1962 in Busto Arsizio.
