= Ambrogio Gianotti =

20th-century Italian Roman Catholic priest and resistance member (1901–1969)

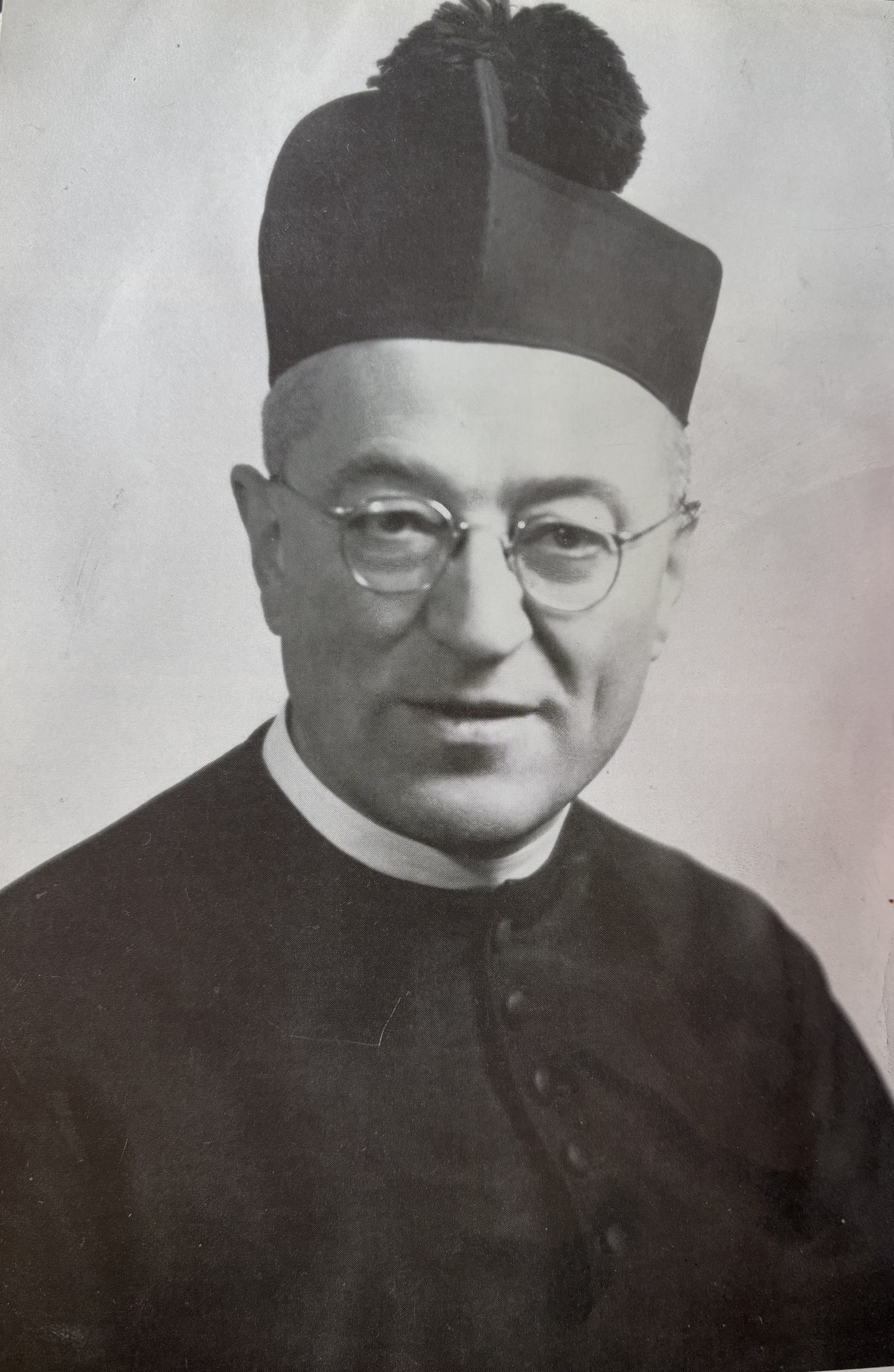
- Don Ambrogio Gianotti in 1950
- Born: 28 October 1901; Senago, Province of Milan, Kingdom of Italy
- Died: 13 April 1969 (aged 67); Busto Arsizio, Province of Varese, Italy
- Occupations: Priest, partigiano

Don Antonio Ambrogio Gianotti (Senago, 28 October 1901 - Busto Arsizio, 13 April 1969) was a Catholic priest and member of the Italian resistance movement.

== Biography ==
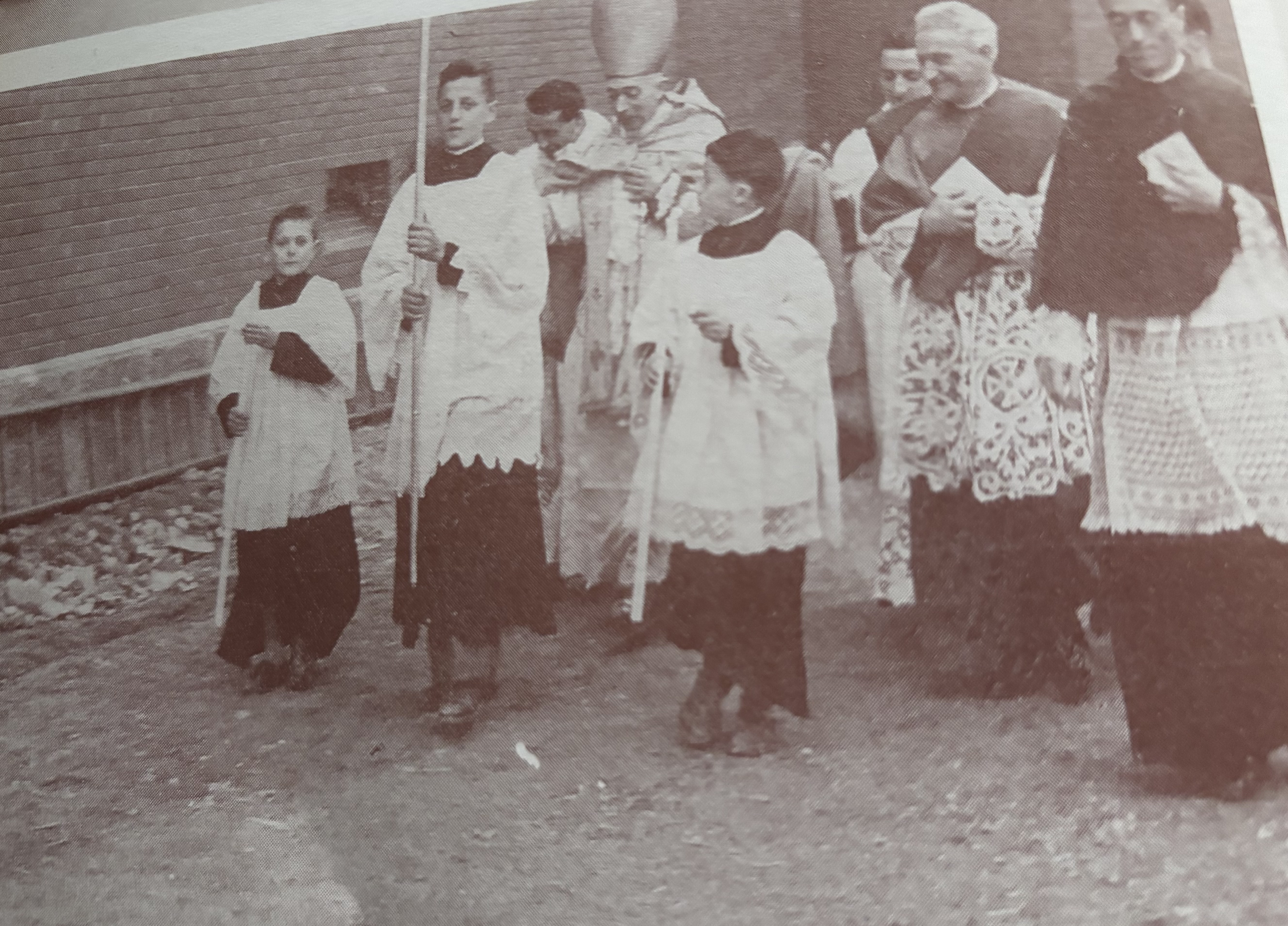
Don Gianotti (far right), Cardinal Schuster, and Norberto Perini (second from the right) during the church’s opening day

Antonio Ambrogio Gianotti was born on 28 October 1901, in Vicolo Borghi 6, Senago. He was the son of Angelo Gianotti and Angela Beretta. He came from a family of farmers and industrialists.

He was ordained a priest in 1930, at the Basilica of Saint John the Baptist, in Busto Arsizio. He was also one of the founders of the Church of Saint Edward, Busto Arsizio.

In 1938 he was commissioned as priest of the 'Strà Brughetto', where the Church of Saint Edward was constructed that same year. He was the parish priest from 1947 until his death in 1969.

During the war, he would collect money and food for the resistance members. He ran the church's food stamp centre, and would use his house as a place where resistance members could hold meetings or rest. His house was used by some of the most important members of the resistance, such as Giovanni Marcora.

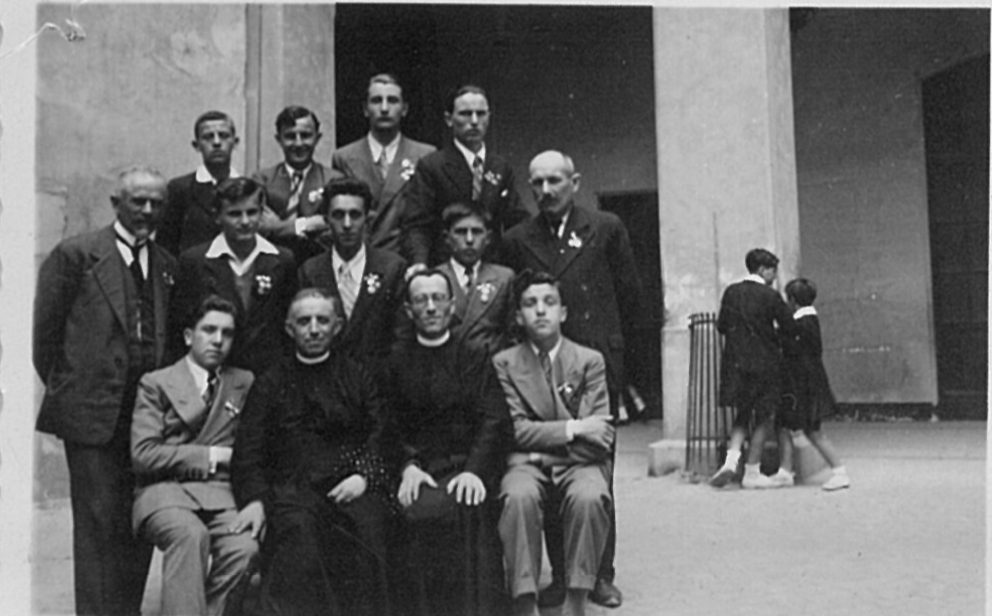
Don Ambrogio Gianotti (second from the right front row) and other partigiani at the church of St. Edward, 1946

It was from the church of St. Edward, at sunrise on the 25 April, that he and other resistance members ordered the liberation of the north of Italy from the fascist forces.

Gianotti was given a gold medal for honorable citizen of Busto Arsizio, by the city's mayor, Gian Pietro Rossi, in 1966. He died on 13 April 1969.

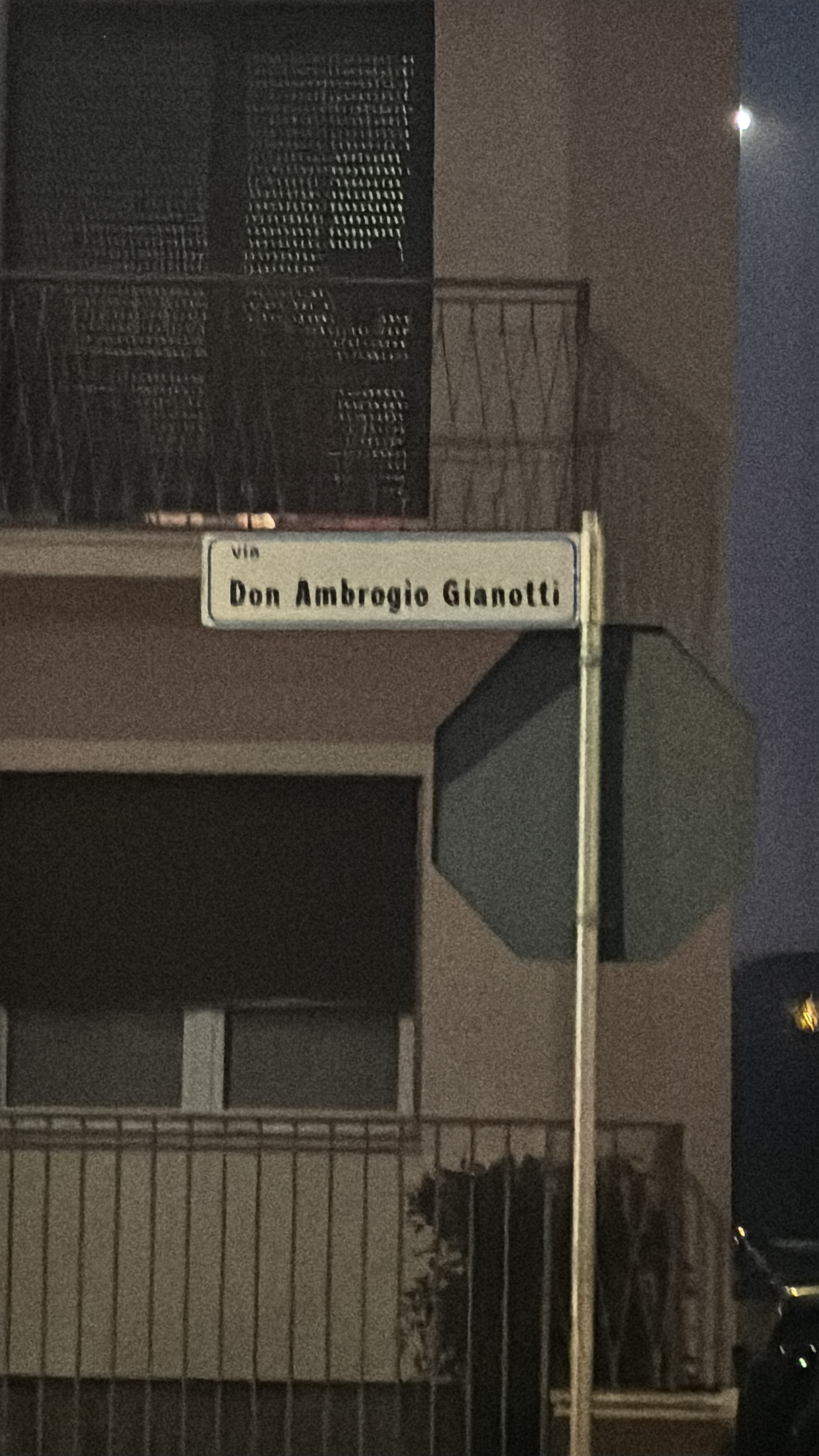
Via Don Ambrogio Gianotti

A street, near the church, is dedicated to Gianotti.
