= Edoardo Lualdi Gabardi =

Italian racing driver (1931–2026)

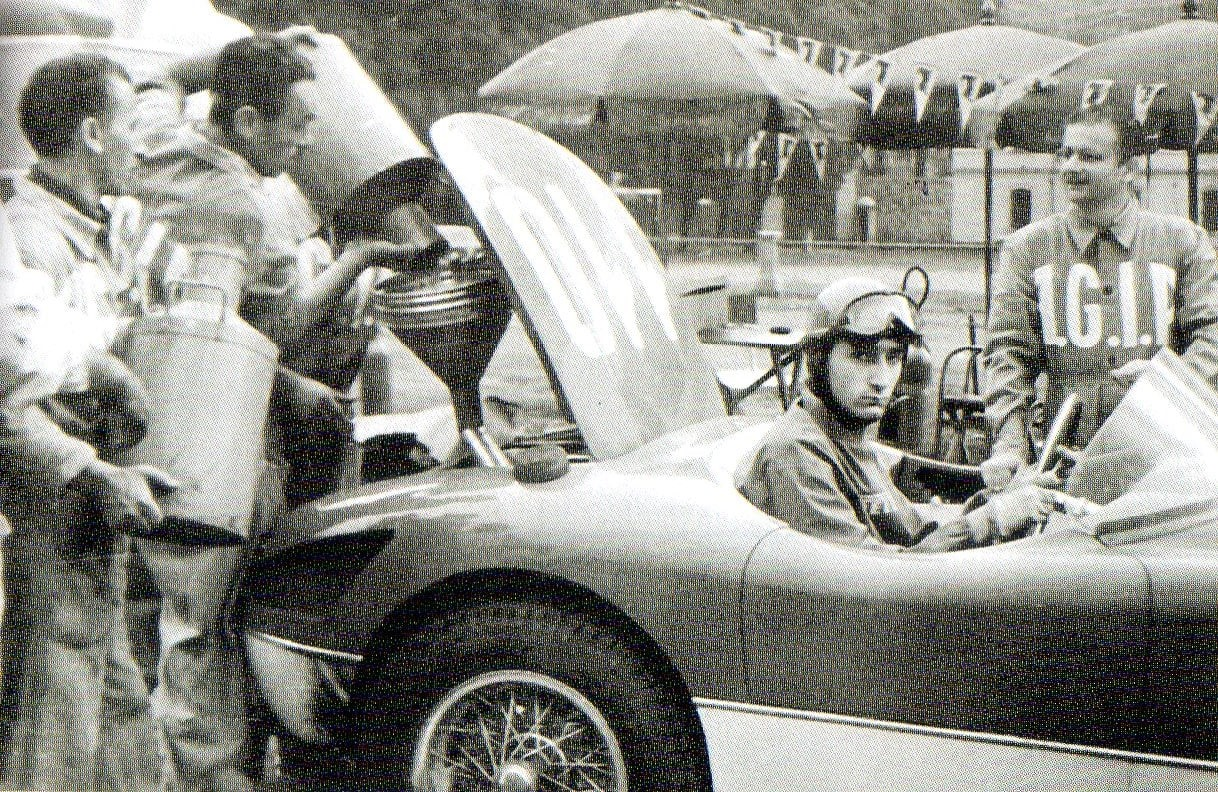
- Born: 13 May 1931; Busto Arsizio, Italy
- Died: 18 April 2026 (aged 94); Busto Arsizio, Italy
- Occupation: Racing Driver
- Spouse: Nalda Colombo (died 2026)
- Relatives: Edoardo Gabardi (grandfather)

Edoardo Lualdi Gabardi (13 May 1931 – 18 April 2026) was an Italian auto racer, who specialised in hillclimbing, as well as a textile businessman. He almost always raced in Ferraris that he had purchased himself, but in order not to squander his fortune, he would sell the car, before buying another one.

== Early life ==
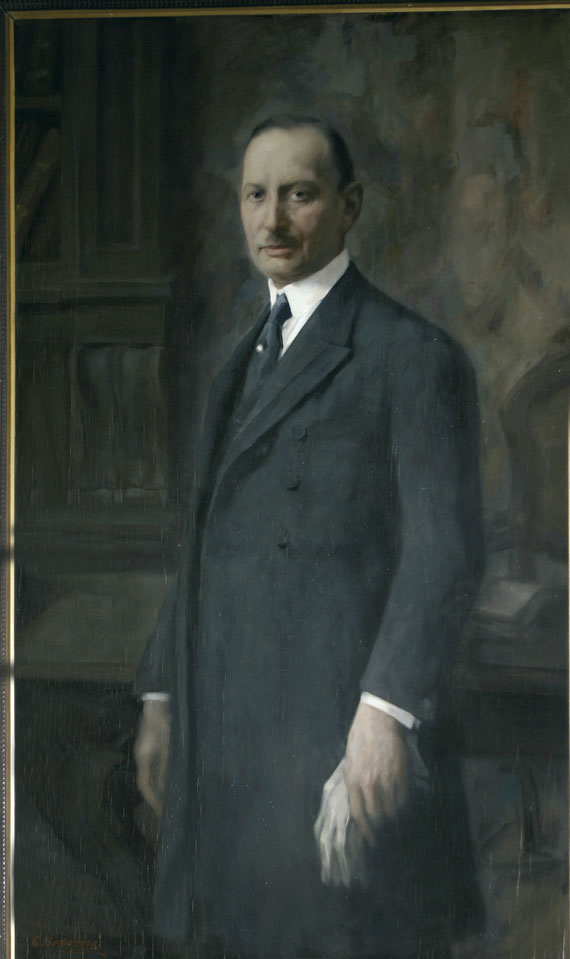
Lualdi Gabardi’s maternal grandfather, Edoardo Gabardi

Edoardo Lualdi Gabardi was born in Busto Arsizio, Lombardy on 13 May 1931, the son of Angelo Battista Lualdi, an engineer, and Edvige Gabardi. He was named after his maternal grandfather, Edoardo Gabardi, a prominent industrialist and philanthropist from Busto Arsizio who owned a textile factory. He lost his mother when he was 6 years old after she died in a car crash coming back from the 1936 Summer Olympics. His father died just 2 years later. Subsequently he was raised by his grandparents.

== Career ==
Gabardi's career began in 1950 at age of nineteen, participating in the Mille Miglia with a Fiat 500 C. He then participated in the Coppa d'Oro delle Dolomiti with the same car, winning. In 1951, he participated in some of the most important national hill climbs with a Dagrada Sport, achieving four victories. In 1953, he purchased a Ferrari 166 MM, which allowed him to achieve his first victory in the Coppa Vi-Va, a race organized on the Monza circuit.

In 1956, he switched to a Ferrari 250 GT, achieving several victories in the Italian Mountain Championship and winning the Mountain Trophy reserved for the grand touring class, and won once again the following year. In the same year, he also won the Coppa Carri at Monza, while in 1958 he won the Coppa Sant'Ambrogio on the Monza circuit. In 1960 and 1961, with the Ferrari 250 GT Berlinetta he was the Italian circuit speed champion in the Gran Turismo class over, and from 1962 to 1967, he won all thirty-seven races in which he participated in, including hill climbs and circuit races, among which were the Gran Turismo Trophy and the Coppa d'Autunno in Monza in 1962, the Coppa della Consuma in 1963, and the Trofeo Bettoja in Vallelunga in 1966.

== Later life and death ==
Lualdi Gabardi was married to Nalda Colombo for over 60 years. She died just two weeks before her husband's death.

Edoardo Lualdi Gabardi died at his home in Busto Arsizio, on 18 April 2026, at the age of 94.
