= Church of St. Edward, Busto Arsizio =

Roman Catholic Church in Busto Arsizio, Italy

Coordinates: 45.6036°N 8.8588°E

Church of Saint Edward
- Parochial Church of Saint Edward, King and Confessor; Italian: Chiesa Parrocchiale di Sant'Edoardo Re e Confessore
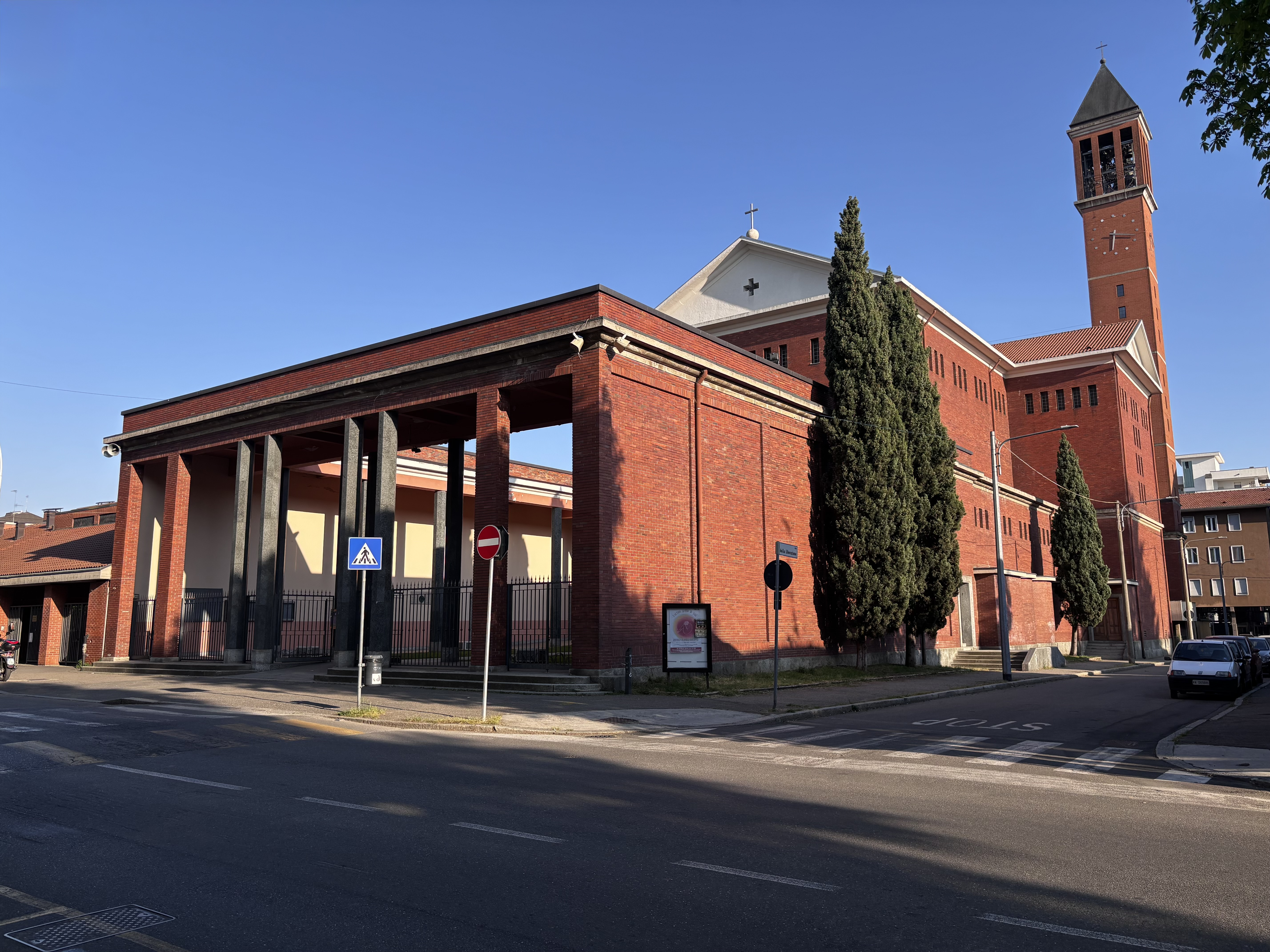
- The church in 2026
- Church of Saint Edward
- Location: Viale Vittorio Alfieri, 14, Busto Arsizio, Lombardy
- Country: Italy
- Denomination: Roman Catholic
- Tradition: Ambrosian Rite

History
- Founded: 24 June 1938
- Founder(s): Don Ambrogio Gianotti, Edoardo Gabardi
- Dedication: Saint Edward
- Dedicated: 1939
- Consecrated: 12 October 1939

Architecture
- Architect(s): Giuseppe Polvara, Giacomo Bettoli
- Style: Byzantine Revival and Romanesque Revival
- Years built: 1938–1939 (Note: Construction of the interior concluded in 2025, after a missing portion of floor was added.)

Specifications
- Capacity: 2000
- Length: 78 m (256 ft)
- Height: 29 m (95 ft) (Note: The bell tower is 52 metres (171 ft) tall.)

Administration
- Division: Neighbourhood of Sant'Edoardo
- Diocese: Diocese of Milan
- Parish: Sant'Edoardo

Clergy
- Priests: Don Antonio Corvi; Don Giorgio Zordan; Don Gabriele Bof

The Church of Saint Edward (Italian: Chiesa di Sant'Edoardo) is a Roman Catholic church in Busto Arsizio, Italy. The church has served as parish church of the neighbourhood of Sant'Edoardo since 1947, and from 1951 to 1991, along with the Church of Santa Croce. Construction of the church began on 24 June 1938 and was consecrated by Cardinal Ildefonso Schuster on 12 October 1939.

In 1945, the Partigiani—including the priest Ambrogio Gianotti—sent word via radio from the church that northern Italy had been freed from Fascist forces. A plaque was erected near the location where the broadcast took place.

== History ==
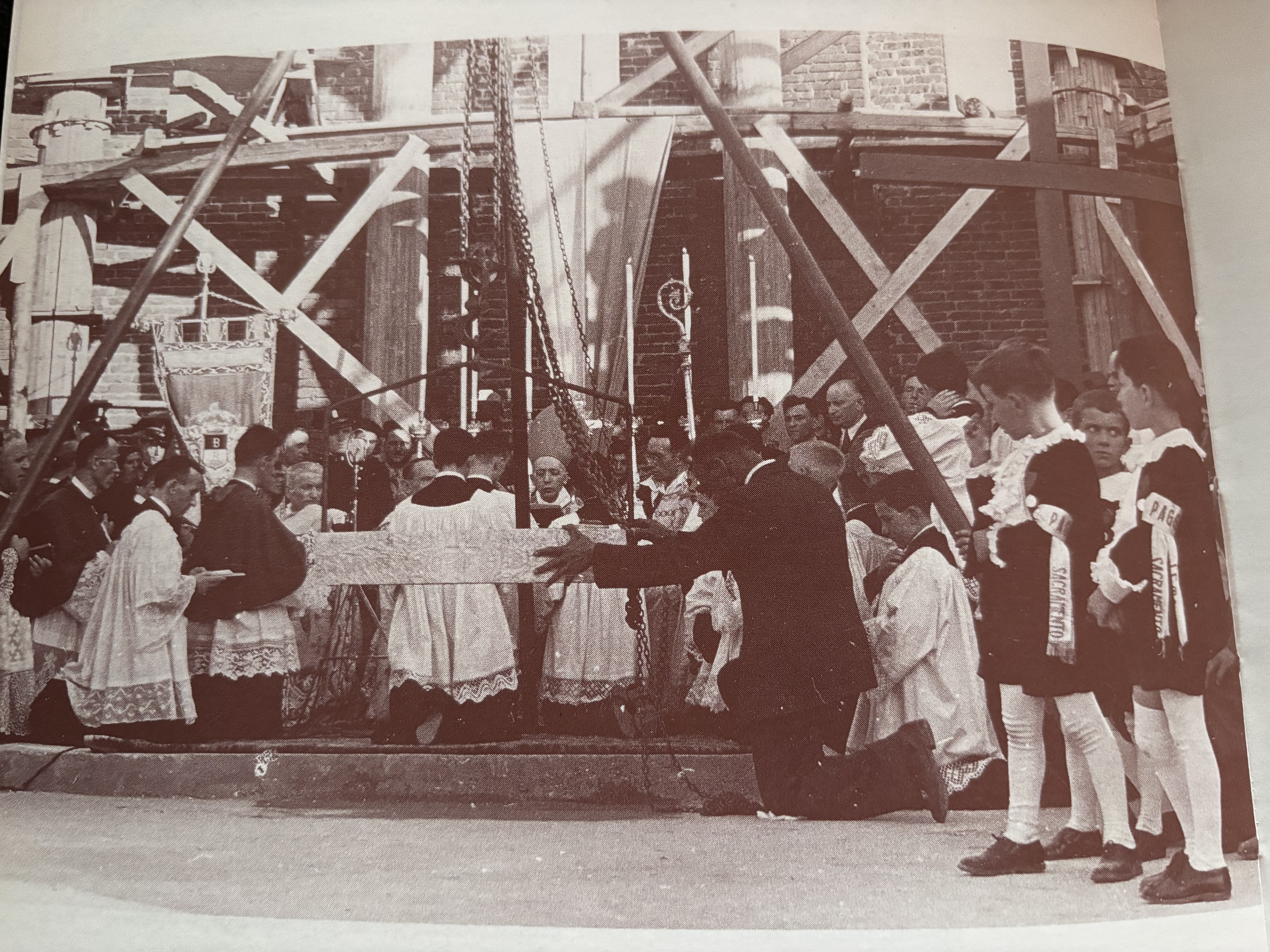
Cardinal Schuster consecrating the foundation stone of the church

In 1936, plans to construct a larger church for the Cascina Brughetto began, due to an increase in the population of the area. The previous church, dedicated to Sant’Eurosia, was demolished in 1954, 15 years after the Church of St. Edward opened, and two years after the Church of Santa Croce opened. The church's crypt was opened on 15 November 1938, and for nearly a year served as the church of Strà Brughetto. The neighbourhood was constructed over one of the presumed sites of the Battle of Legnano, and before the 1940s, was scarcely populated, with its residents living in Cascinas, predominantly owned by the Azzimonti, Brazzelli, Colombo, Crespi, Girola, Lualdi, Pellegatta, Tosi, and Tovaglieri families, whose descendants still reside in the neighbourhood today.

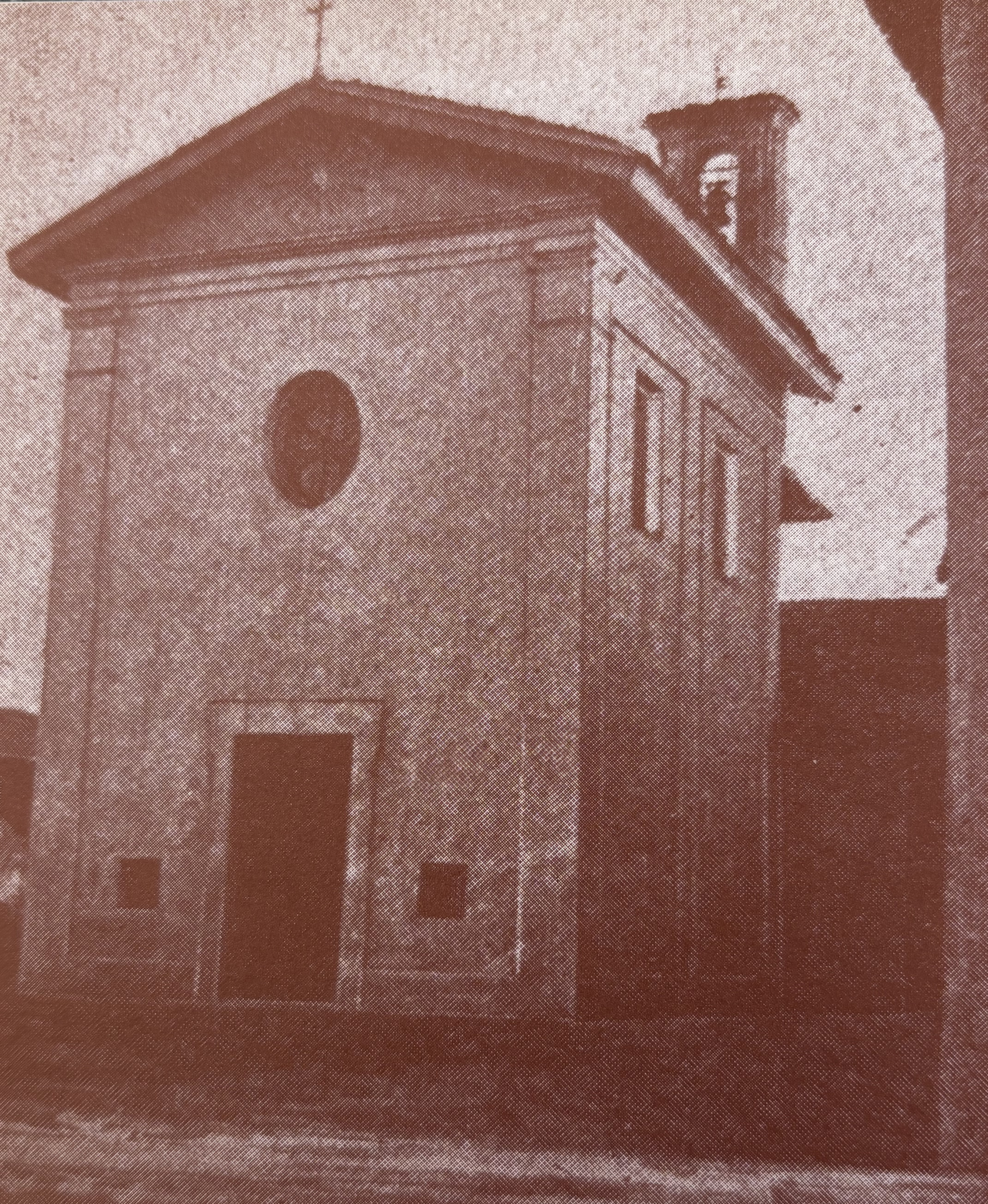
The Church of Saint Eurosia

Construction of the church began on 24 June 1938 and was finished and consecrated on 12 October 1939 (Note: Construction of the interior concluded in 2025, after a missing portion of the floor was added.) by Cardinal Ildefonso Schuster. The church was primarily funded by Edoardo Gabardi, to whom the church was dedicated.

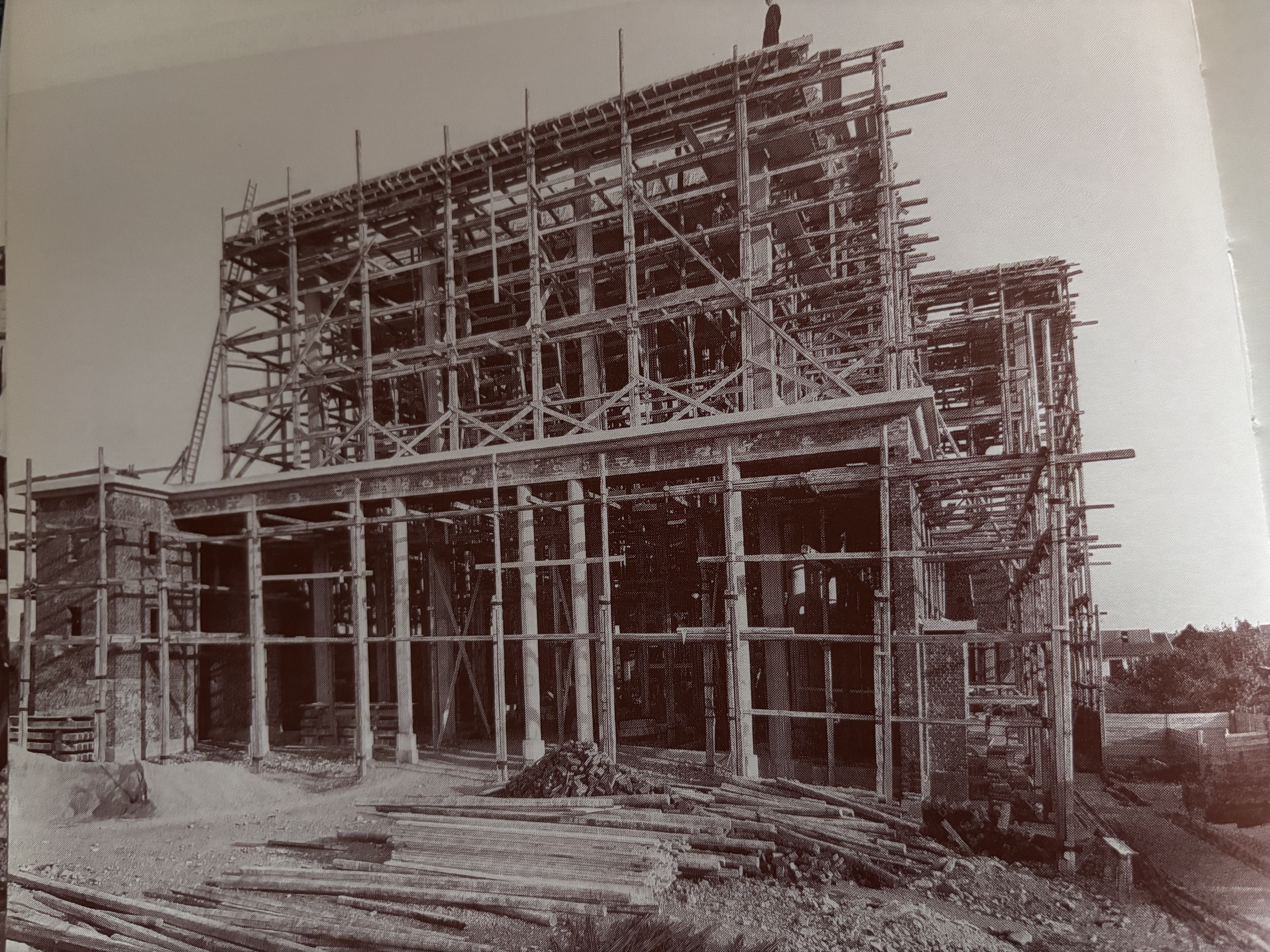
Construction of the Façade, 1938

The church was designed by two architect-priests, Don Giuseppe Polvara and Don Giacomo Bettoli. The architects took inspiration from the Basilica of Sant'Ambrogio and the Basilica of Saint Paul Outside the Walls. The frescos were painted between 1943 and 1947 by Ernesto Bergagna, with additional frescos painted in 1985 by Giuseppe Magini.

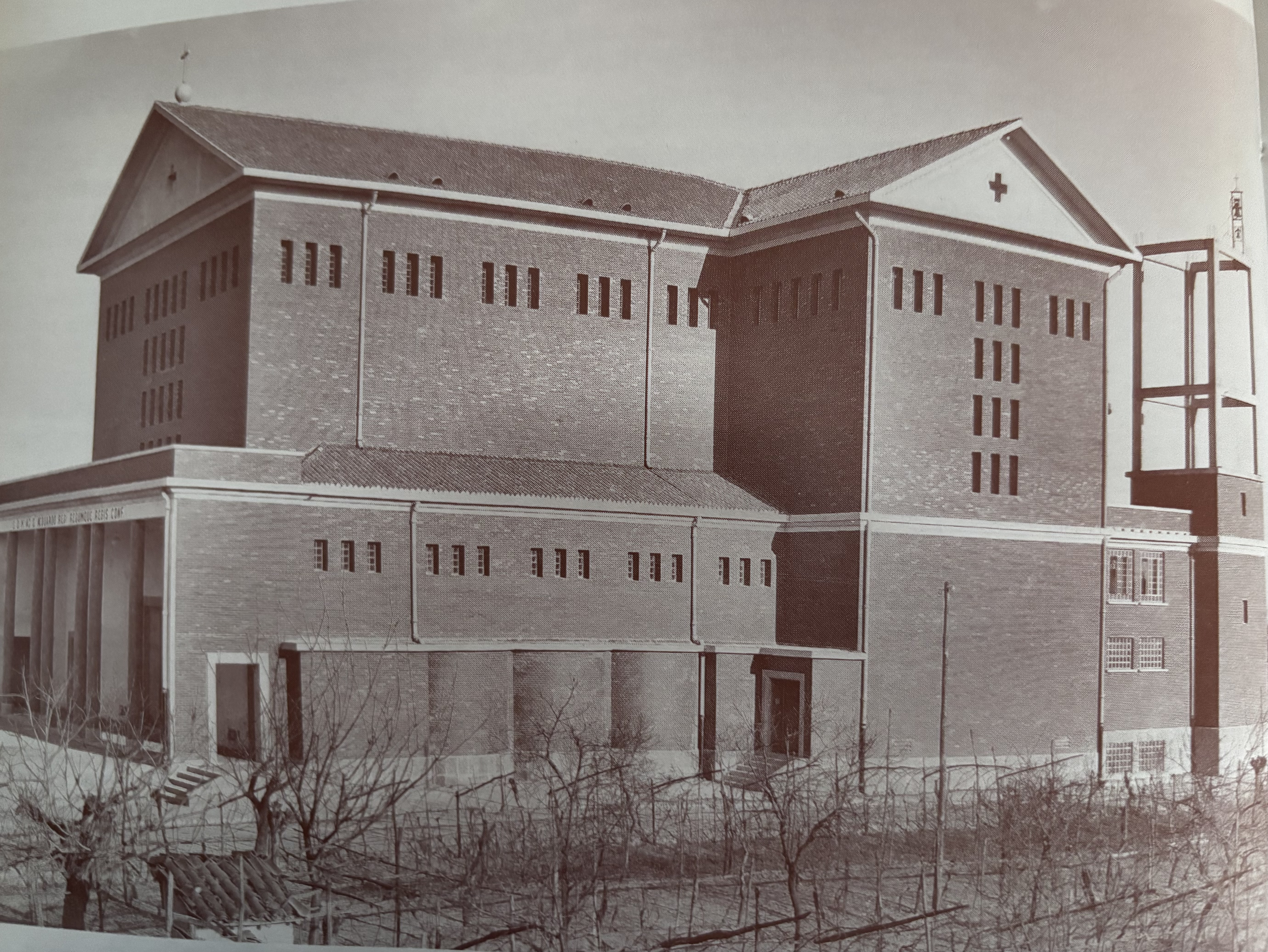
The Church in 1939

In 1945, at the church, the order for the partigiani to liberate the area was sent from the church. The first priest, Don Ambrogio Gianotti, was a partigiano. The church became the parish church for the neighbourhood in 1947.

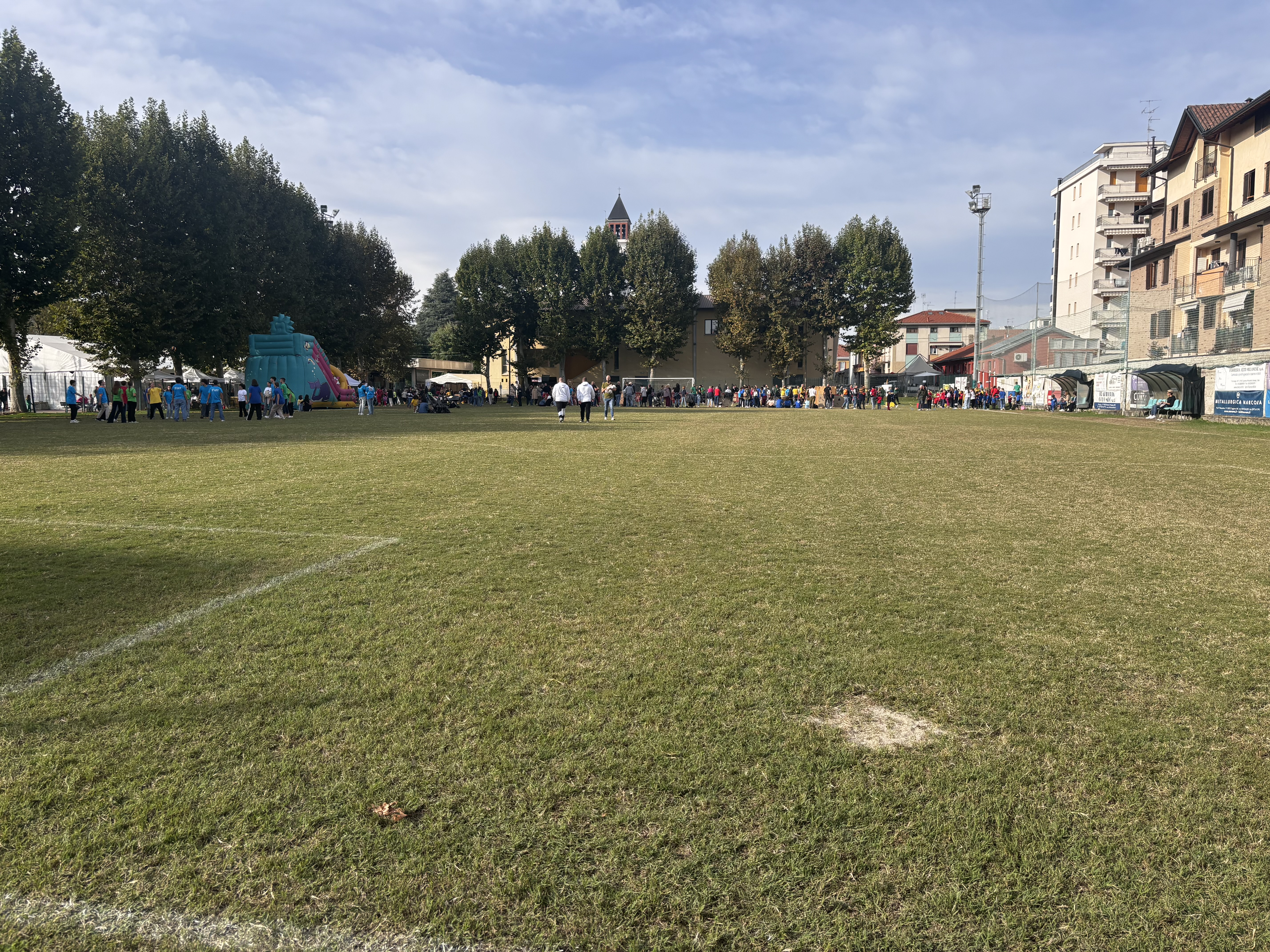
The Oratorio on St. Edward's day, 2024

In 1972 the church acquired the paintings from the Church of Santa Croce, which was demolished that year. The church also has an Oratorio, dedicated to Giovanni Bosco. The oratorio was founded on 19 January 1947, by Don Silvio Gallazzi, who created the church's 'summer school' in the summer of 1946. It was replaced with the oratorio in 1947. Currently, the oratorio is directed by Don Gabriele Bof.

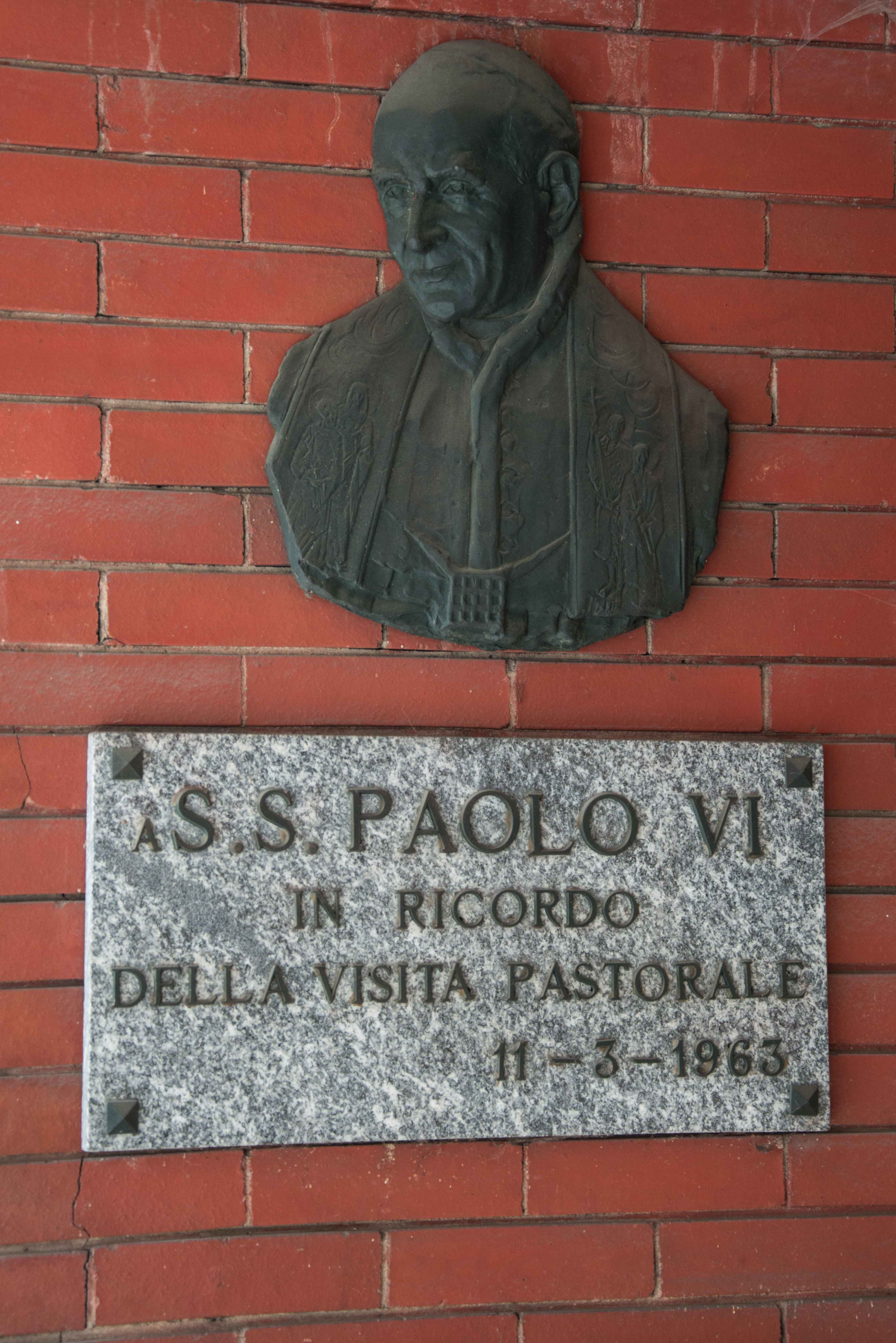
Plaque erected after the visit of the Archbishop of Milan, Giovanni Battista Montini.

On 11 March 1963, the church was briefly visited by the then Archbishop of Milan, Giovanni Battista Montini, who would be elected Pope a few months later. On the 10 April 1976, the church was visited by the Archbishop of Milan, Giovanni Colombo.

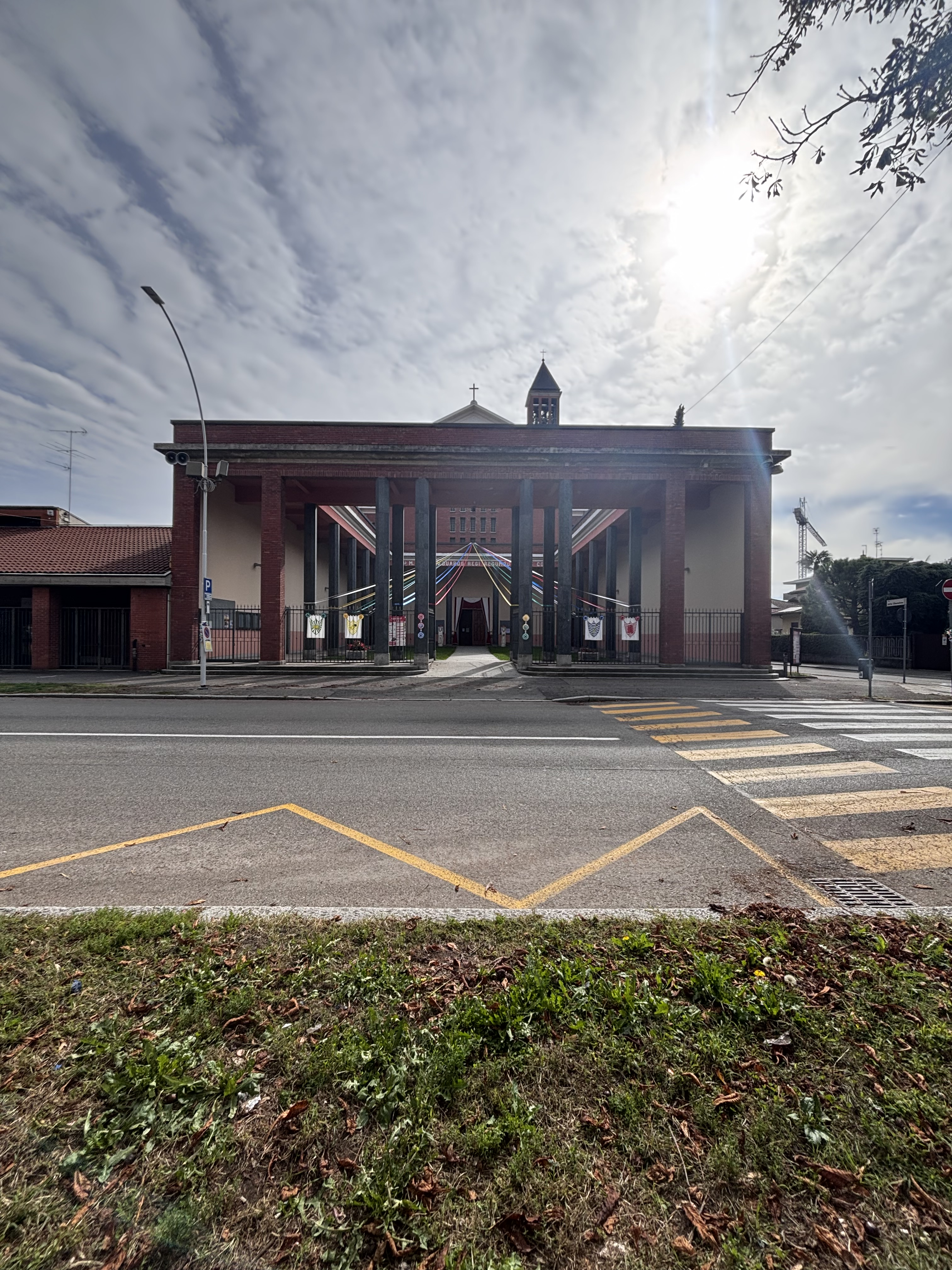
The church decorated for the patron saint day festival

The church's construction was officially finished in 2025, after they added a missing section of the floor by the organ. The church was visited by the Archbishop of Milan, Mario Delpini. on 8 November 2026 during his pastoral visit of Busto Arsizio.

== Architecture ==
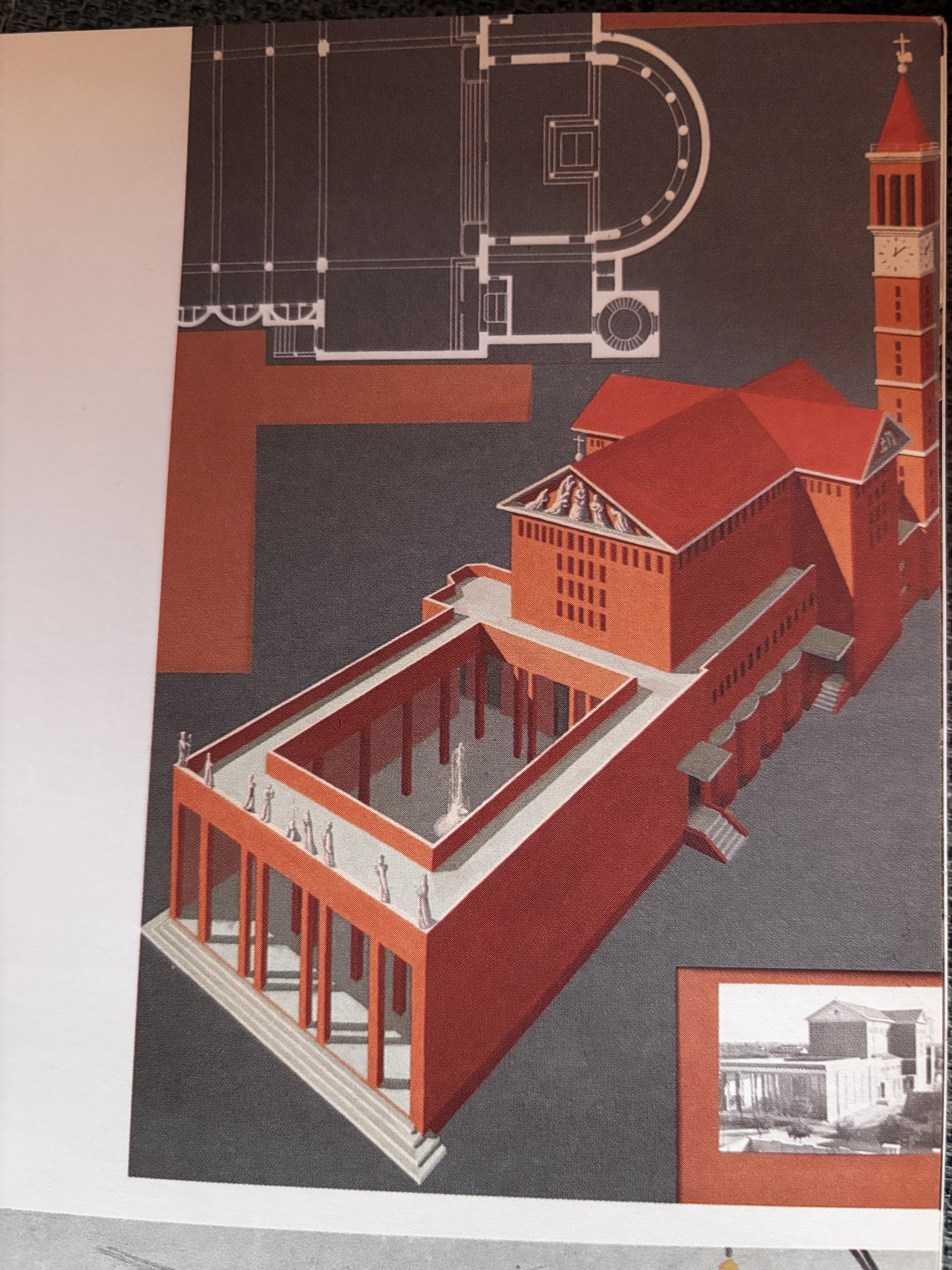
The first proposed design of the church

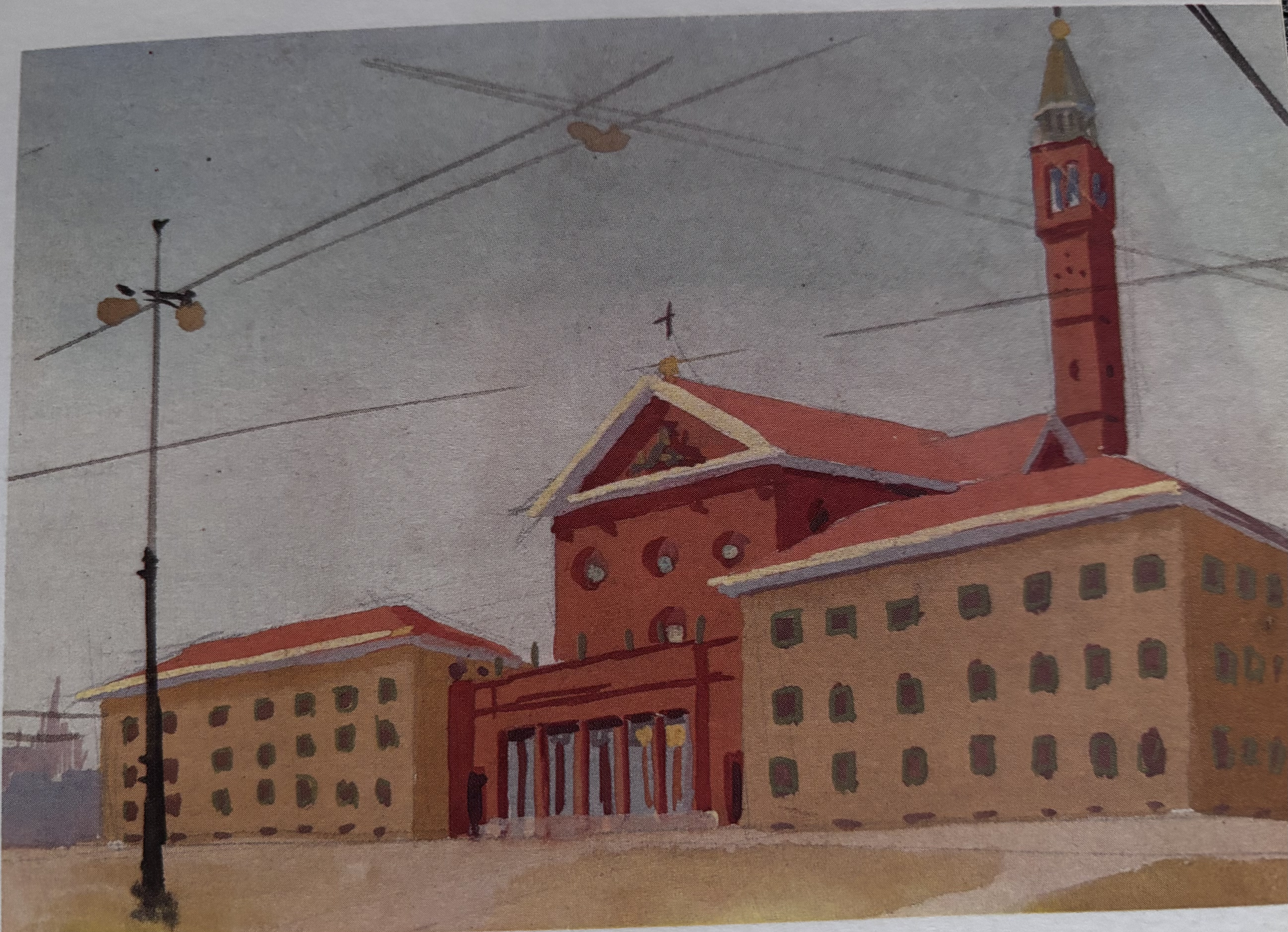
The second proposed design of the church

=== Interior ===
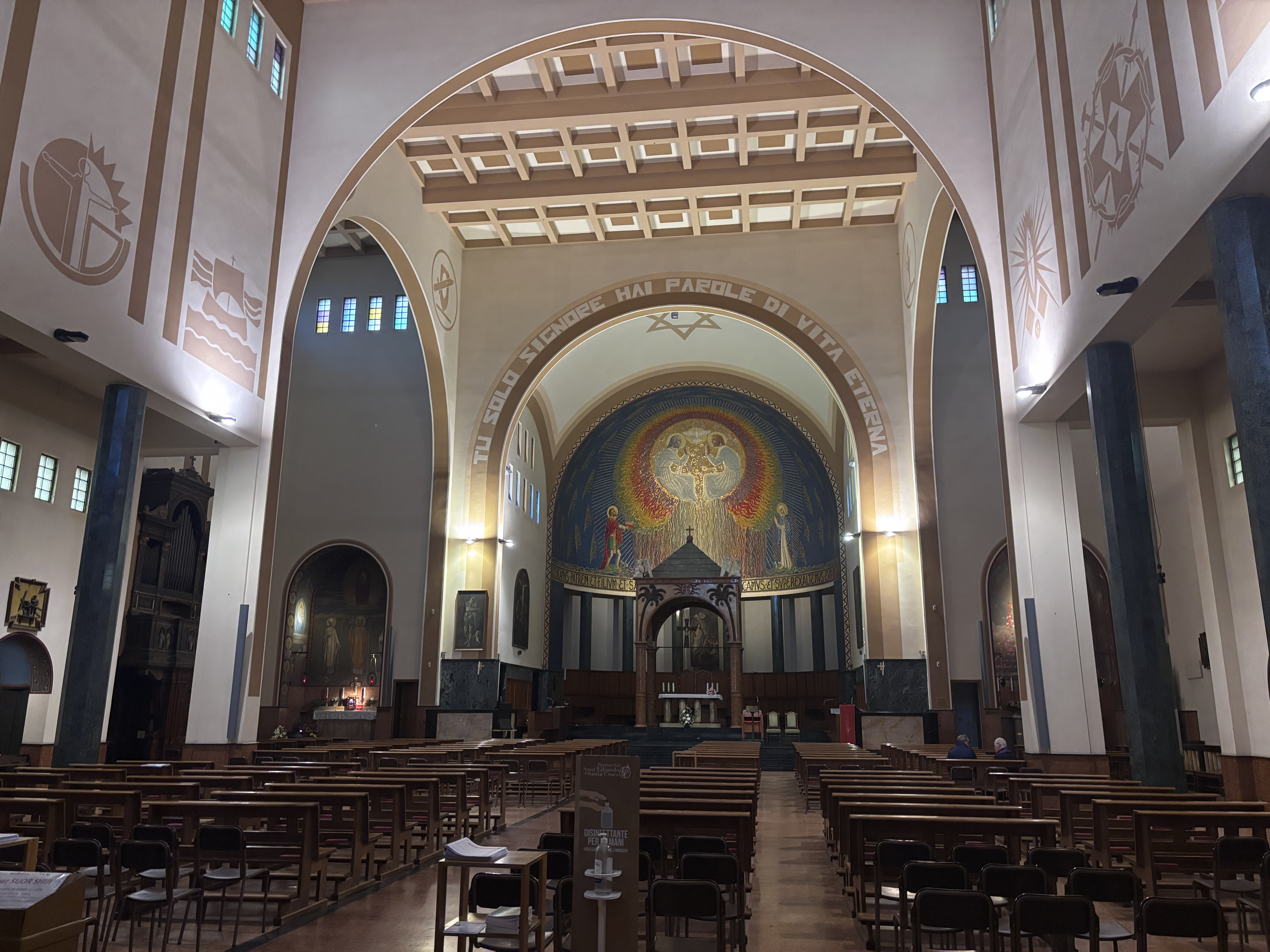
The interior in 2025

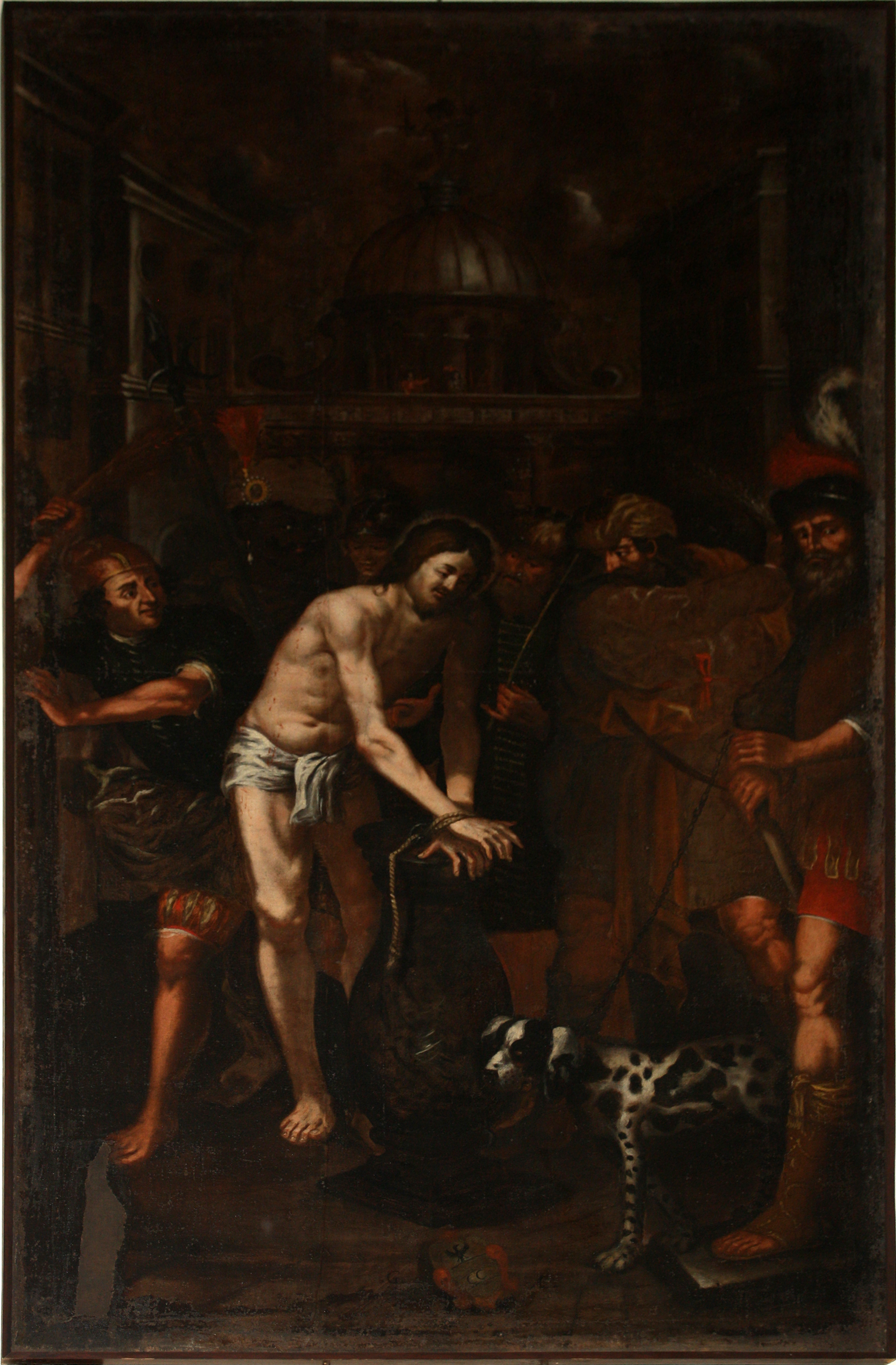
Flagellazione by Ambrogio Bellotti, uncle of Biagio Bellotti, 1661. Once conserved in the Church of Santa Croce, now in Sant’Edoardo.

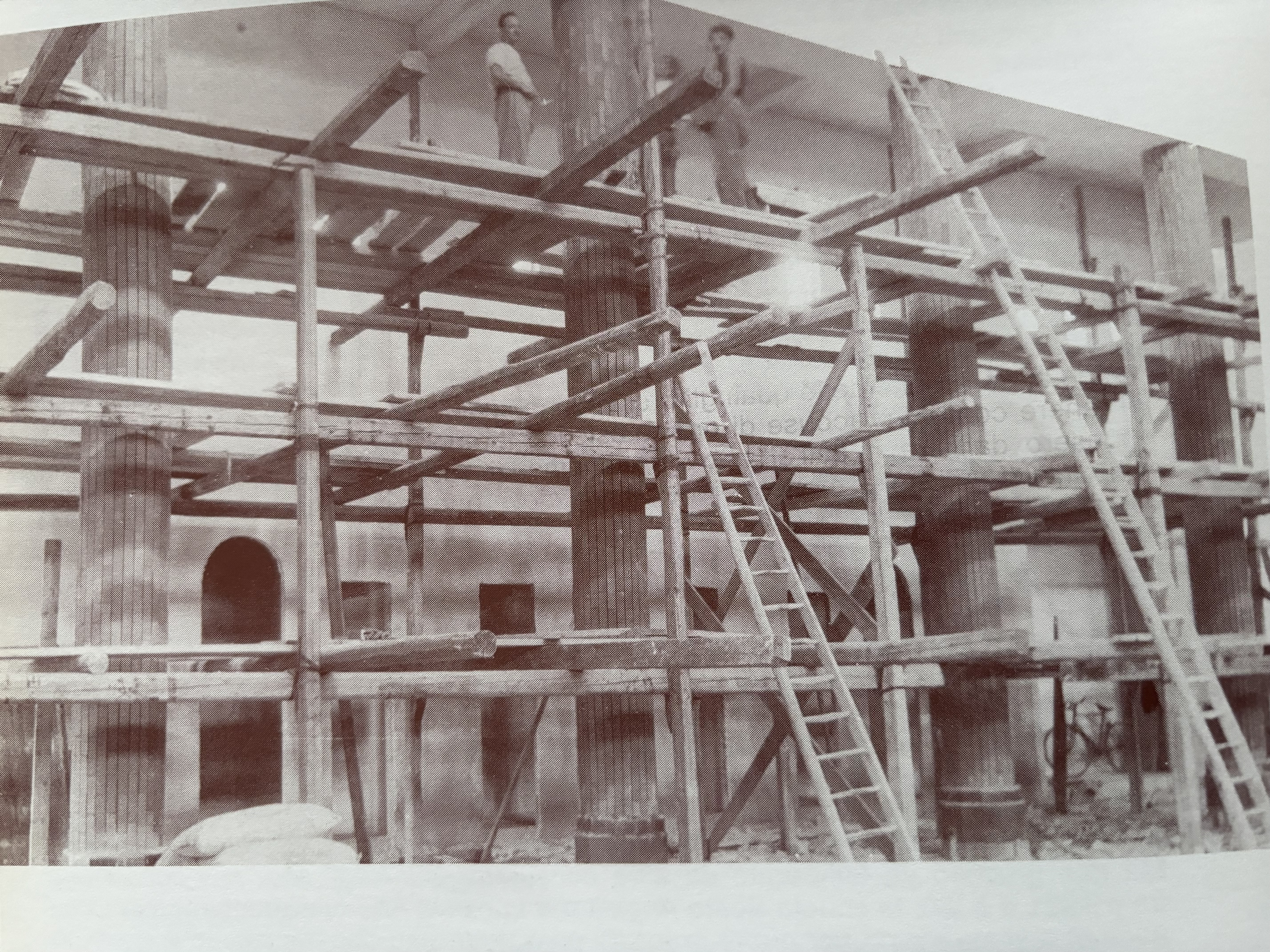
Construction of the interior

The interior of the church is decorated with frescos, painted by Ernesto Bergagna and Giuseppe Magini. At the back of the altar there is a large mosaic, representing the trinity, made by the ‘Beato Angelico’ school. Various artworks present in the church came from the old Church of Santa Croce, demolished in 1972. Much of the church's interior, especially the baptistery, was constructed with Rosso Ammonitico, a type of marble known for its high density of ammonites, which are visible on the church's walls, floors, and altars.

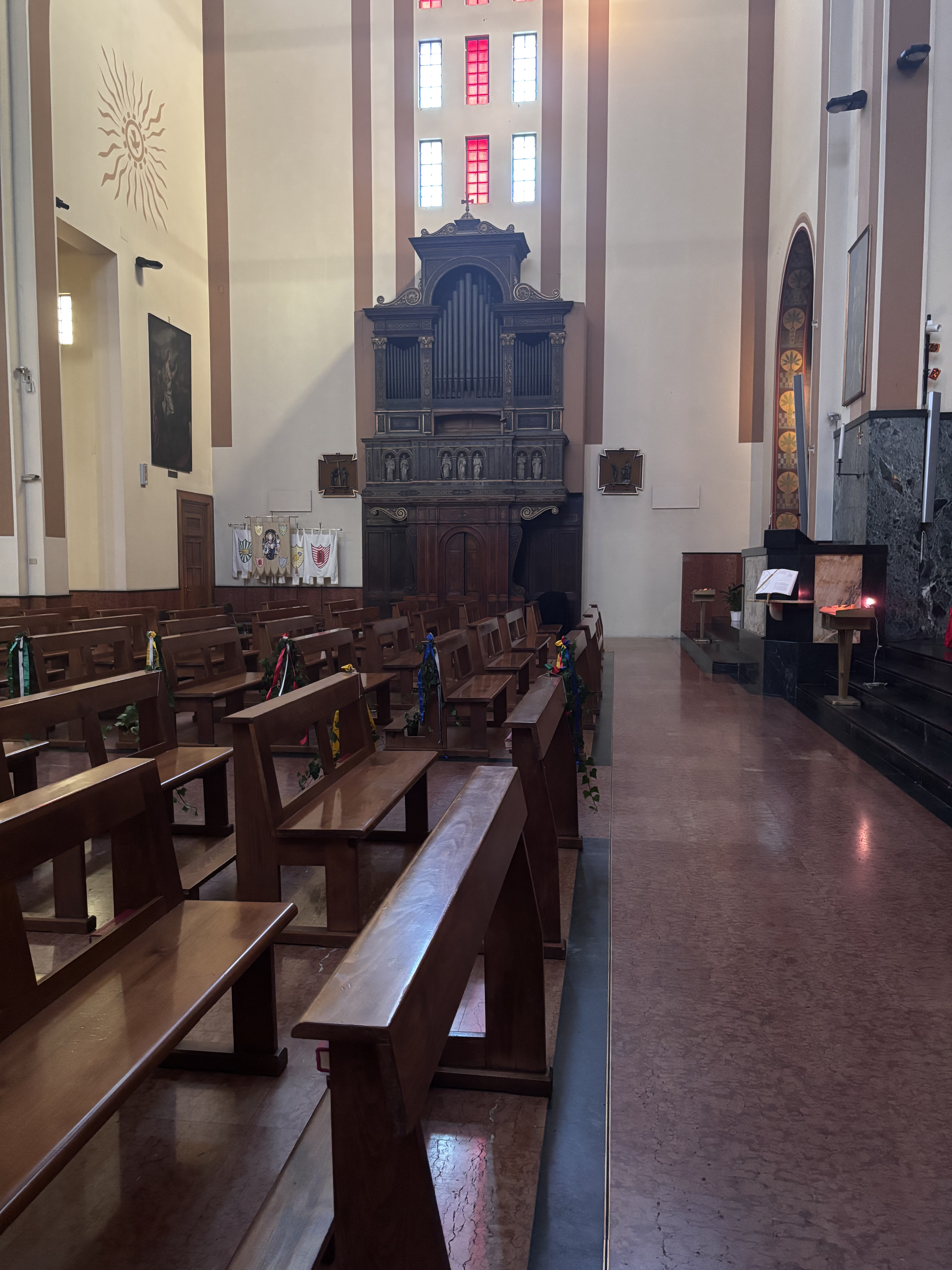
The organ of the church of Saint Edward

On the left side of the church, near the altar, there is the church's organ, donated by the church of Santa Maria di Piazza. The nave has four chapels, two on the left side, two on the right. Along with the main altar, there are two other altars on each side of the main altar. The church's organ has never been used, due to the fact that the floor surrounding it was missing until 2025, concluding the church's construction.

==== Frescos ====
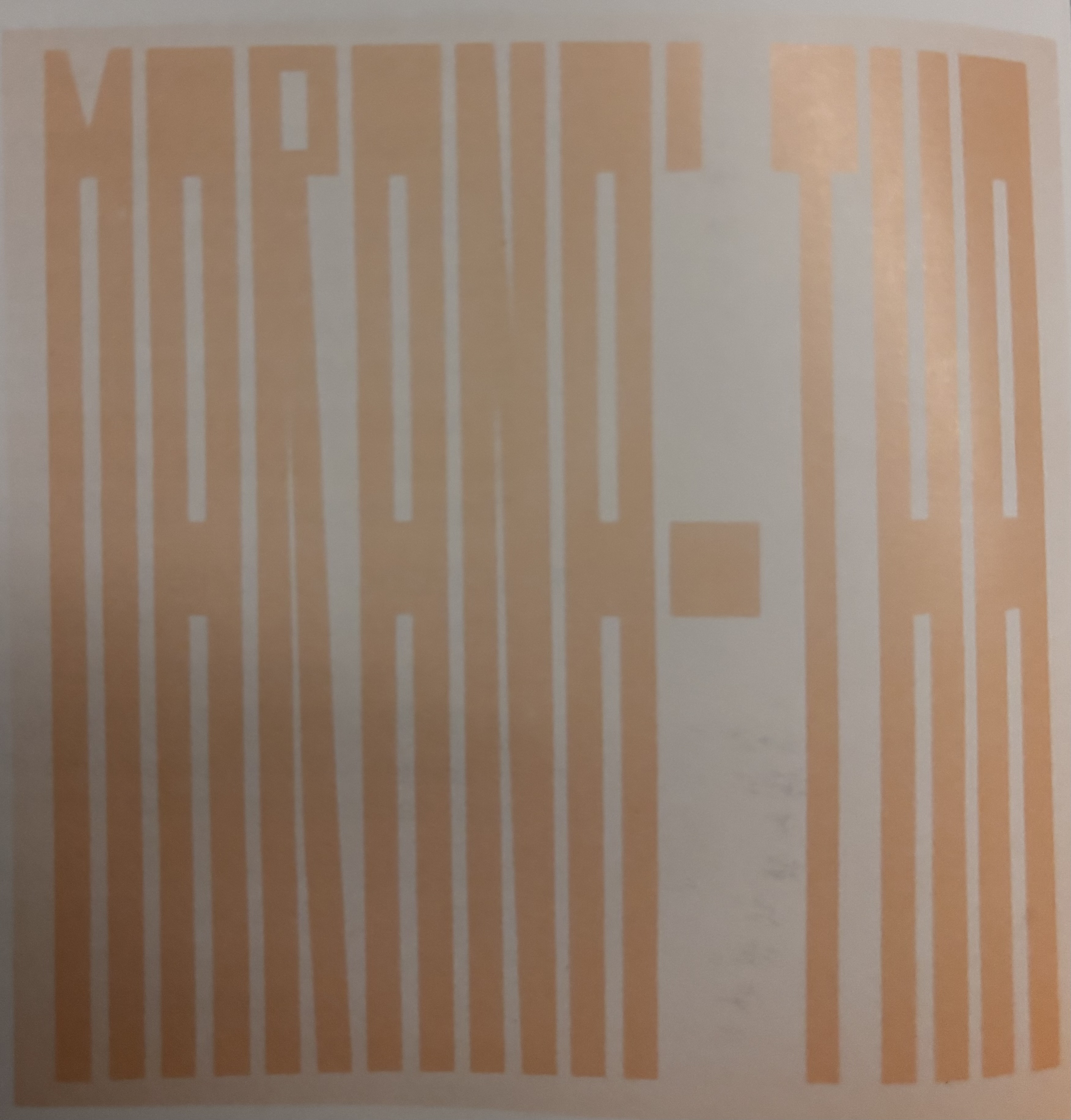
The Maranatha fresco

The frescos on the churches side walls were painted in 1985 by Giuseppe Magini. There are 12 frescos on the walls. Magini chose these frescos to represent the prayer of the Profession of faith, and they terminate on the church's main arch with the words ' Tu solo Signore hai parole di vita eterna (Only you Lord have the words of eternal life). Each of the 12 frescos depicts a verse from the profession of faith prayer. The 12th fresco depicts Maranatha (מרנאתא). This was chosen to represent the community's unity and hope. The frescoes are supposed to be read left to right, starting from the right side of the church.

==== Chapels ====
The nave has four chapels, two on the right, two on the left.

On the left side there is:

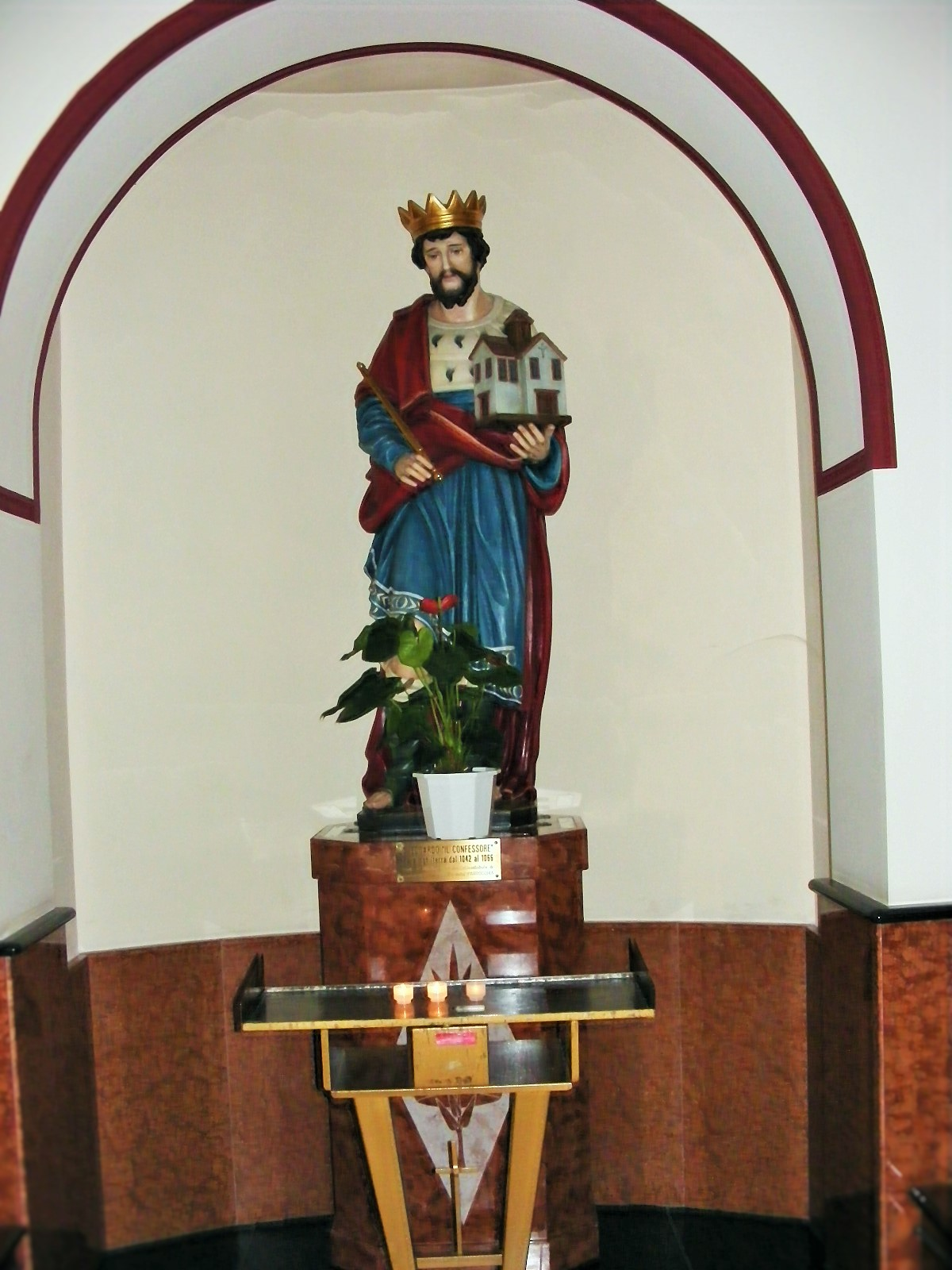
The chapel dedicated to Saint Edward

- A chapel dedicated to Saint Edward. This chapel was built fairly recently, with the statue of Saint Edward being sculpted in 1994.

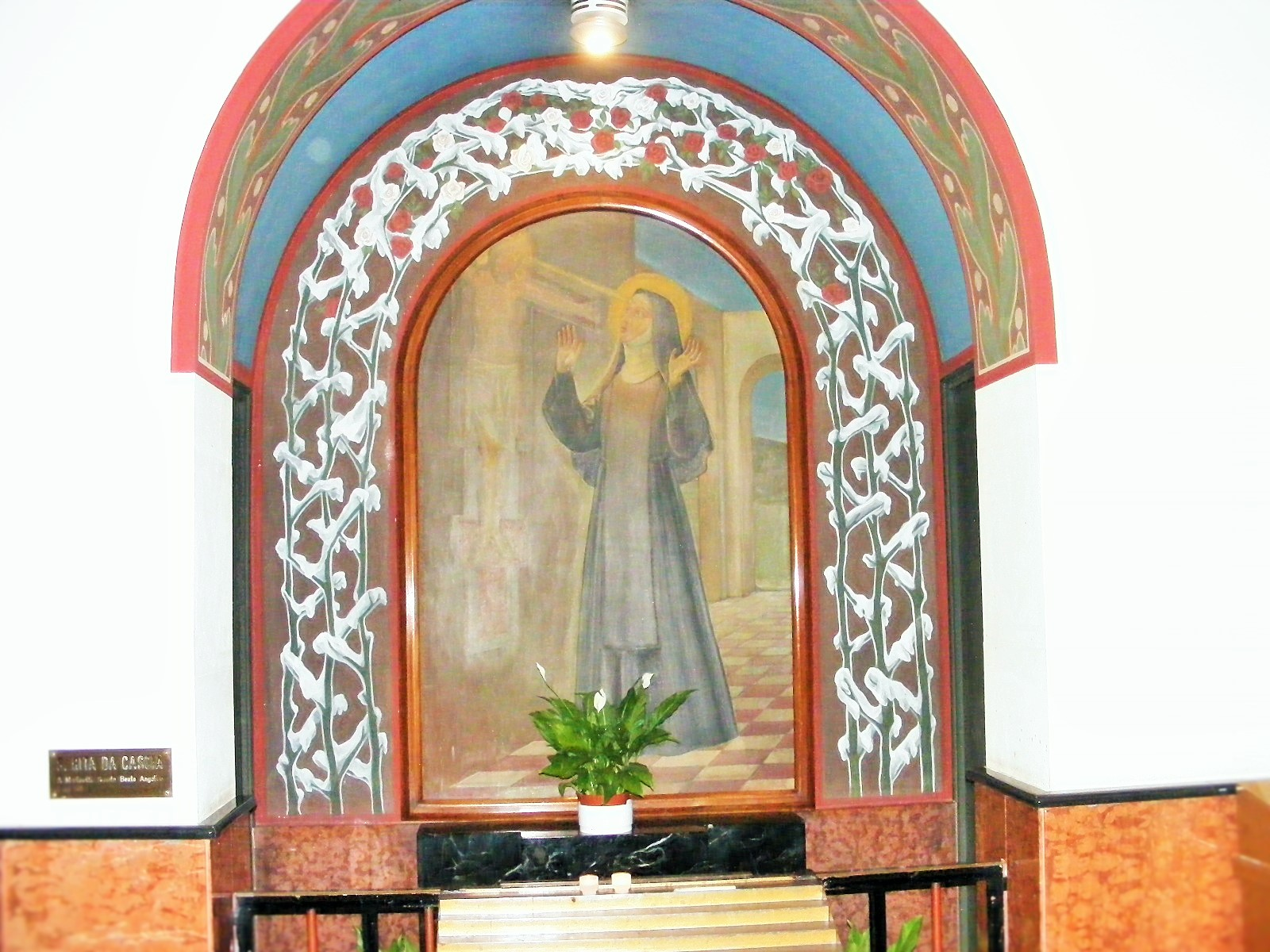
Chapel dedicated to Saint Rita of Cascia

- A chapel dedicated to Saint Rita of Cascia. The chapel was built in 1943 and the portrait of Saint Rita was painted by Bregagna. The chapel also has a black marble altar in front of the painting. It was restored in July 1989, in honour of the church's 50th anniversary.

On the right side there is:

- A chapel dedicated to Saint Teresa. This chapel is similar to the one dedicated to Saint Rita. It has a small black altar at the front, with a portrait of Saint Teresa in the back. This chapel was also built in 1943, by Bergagna and was also restored in July 1989.
- The tomb of Don Ambrogio Gianotti. This tomb was built in 1980, and Gianotti was officially interred there 11 years after his death, on the 12 April 1980, after being moved from the cemetery of Busto Arsizio. The tomb also features a portrait of Jesus Christ.

==== Altars ====
The church, along with the main altar, has two smaller altars on each side of the main altar. The main altar is situated underneath the apse of the church and is covered with a Ciborium. On the sides of the ciborium there are a series of palm trees, which reference Palm Sunday, and the interior of the ciborium is decorated with mosaics. On top of the ciborium there are four statues, which depict the Tetramorph of the Four Evangelists. The ciborium is topped with a marble cross.

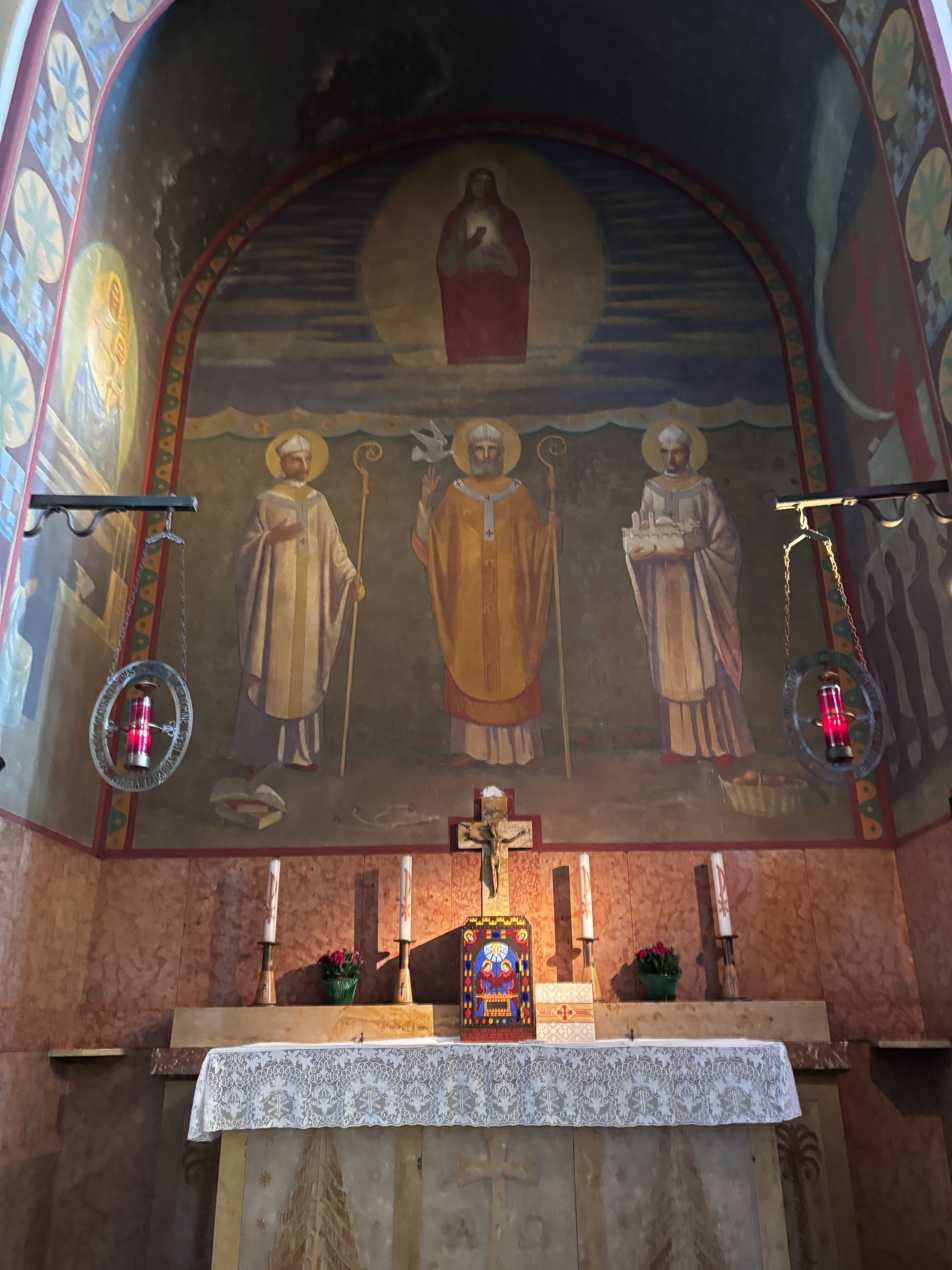
The Altar of Saints Ambrose, Charles, and Galdino

On the left side there is:

- The Altar dedicated to the Saints Ambrose, Charles Borromeo, and Galdino. This altar is decorated with frescos of the three saints, along with a fresco of Our Lady of Help painted by Bergagna between 1943 and 1947. The altar was consecrated in 1947. On the altar, there is the church's tabernacle. The tabernacle was made by the Beato Angelico school.

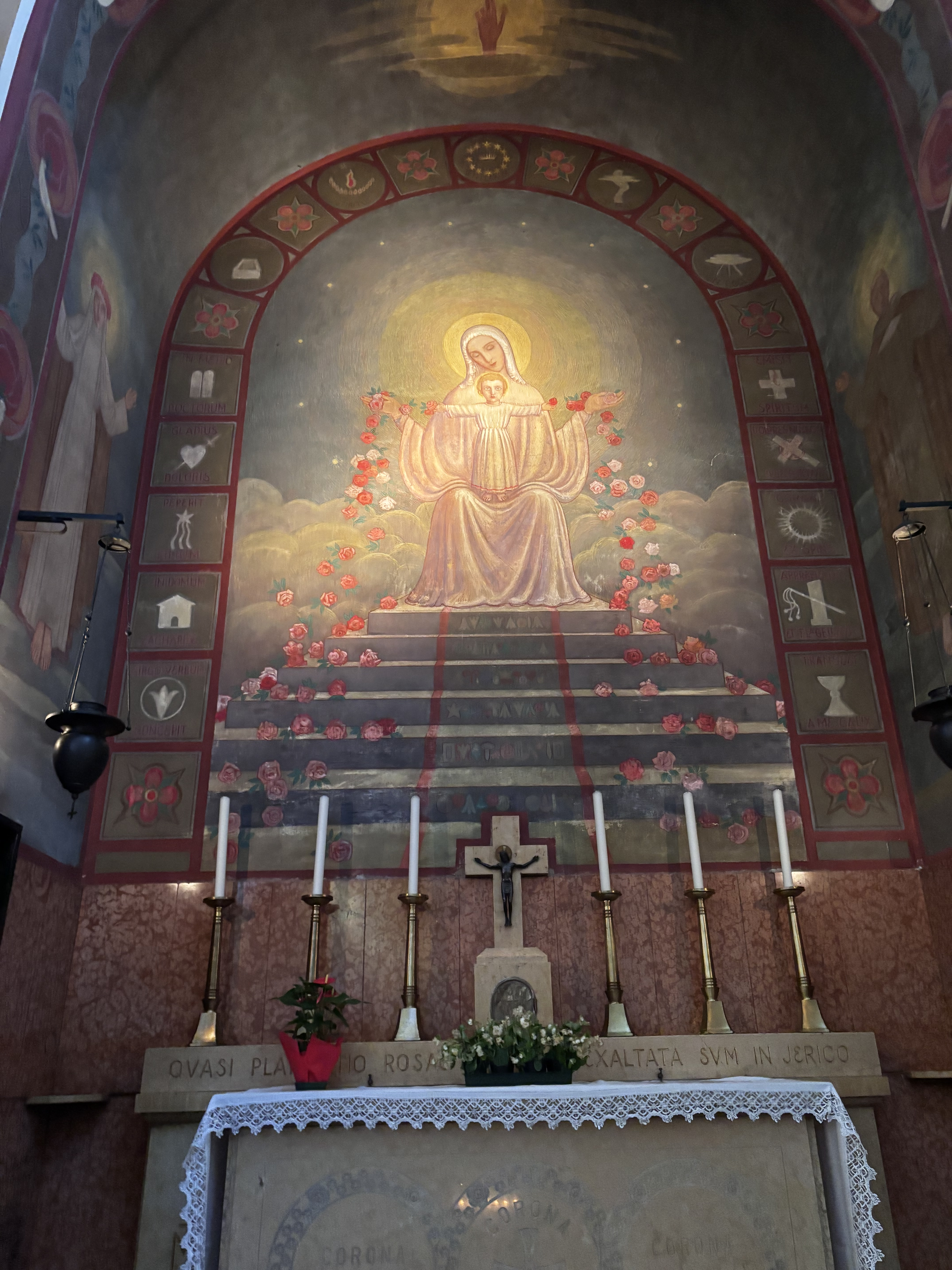
Altar of the Madonna of the Rosary

On the right side there is:

- The Altar dedicated to Madonna of the Rosary. This altar was constructed between 1943 and 1947, and consecrated in 1947. Behind the altar there is a large fresco depicting the Madonna holding the baby, Jesus. Around this fresco there are various pictograms. Each pictogram depicts a verse from the Ave Maria. This was all designed and executed by Bergagna.

==== Apse ====
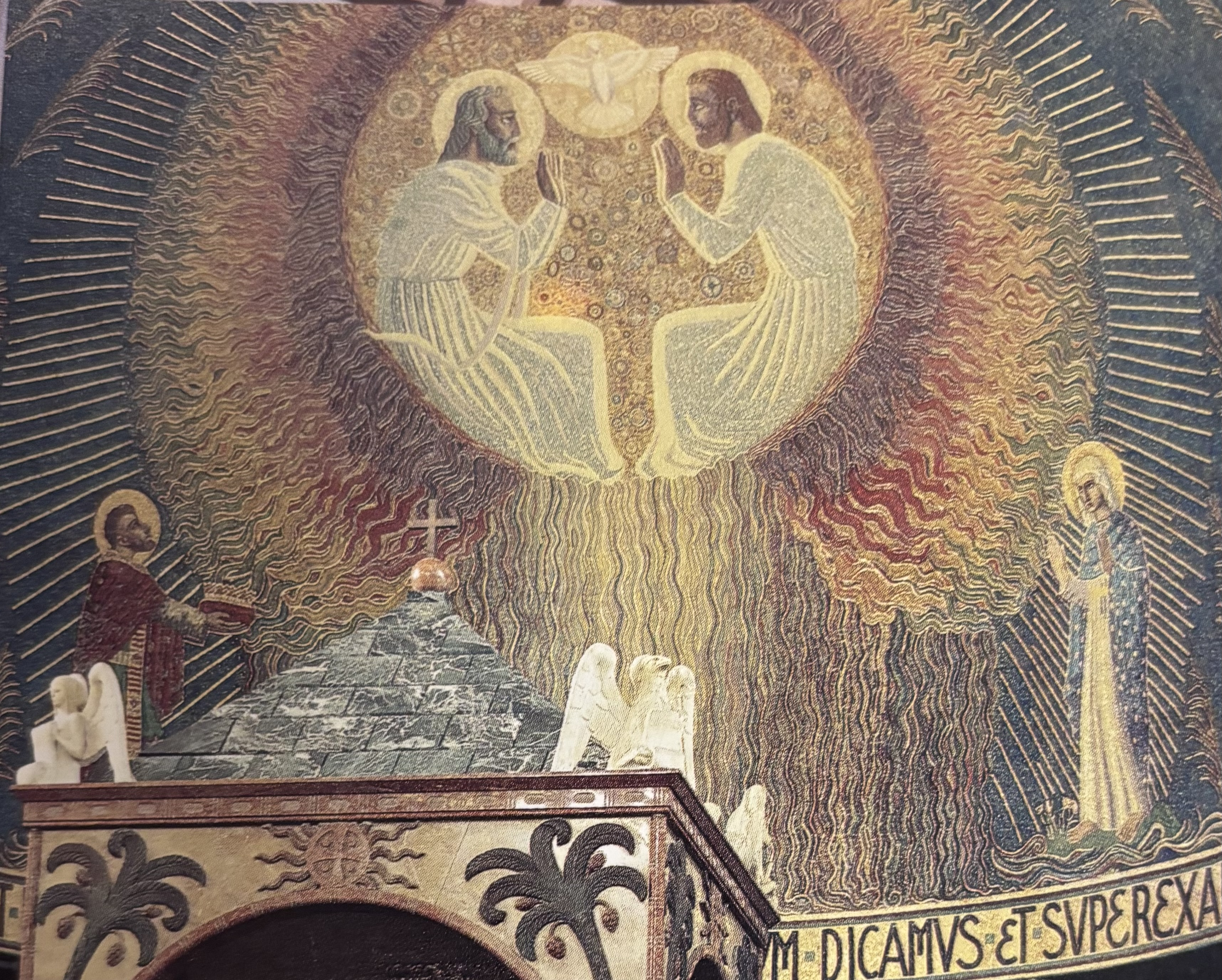
The Apse of the Church of St. Edward

The Apse displays a mosaic, inspired by Byzantine architecture. It depicts four figures; Saint Edward, who holds a crown, and the Holy Mary. They face towards the trinity, which sit in a gold circle in the centre, between a dove, chosen by Bergagna to represent peace. On the mosaic, are inscribed the words: 'PATREM ET FILIUM ET SANCTUM SPIRITUM DICAMUS ET SUPEREXALTEMUS EUM IN SÆCULA' which translate to 'Let us praise the Father and the Son, and the Holy Spirit, and exalt Him forever'. The apse was constructed between 1959 and 1961, by Ernesto Bergagna. It was designed by Bergagna and the Beato Angelico school.

==== Baptistery ====
The baptistery was constructed between 1940 and 1941, and was decorated by Ernesto Bergagna between 1943 and 1947. The baptistery has an octagonal shape and each side depicts a fresco of a biblical event associated with baptisms. In the center there is the baptismal font made of marble and a small altar. It is located to the left of the Chapel dedicated to Sant’Edoardo.

=== Exterior ===
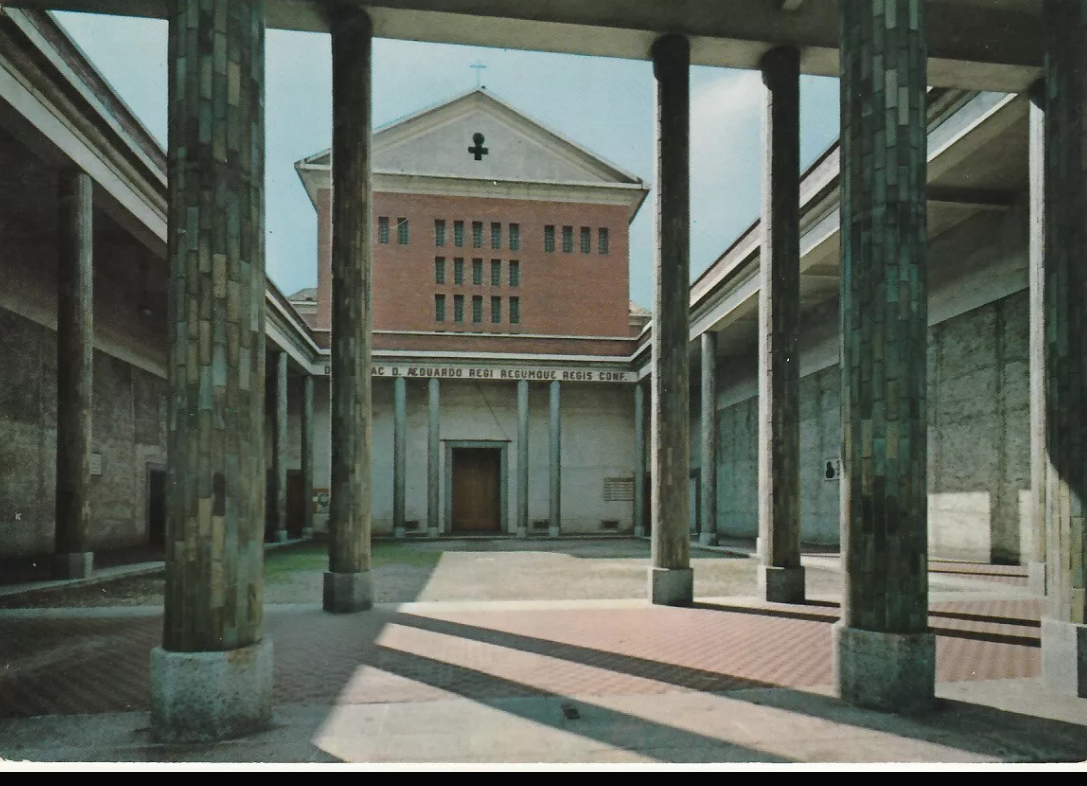
The Portico of the church in the late 1970s. It has since been renovated

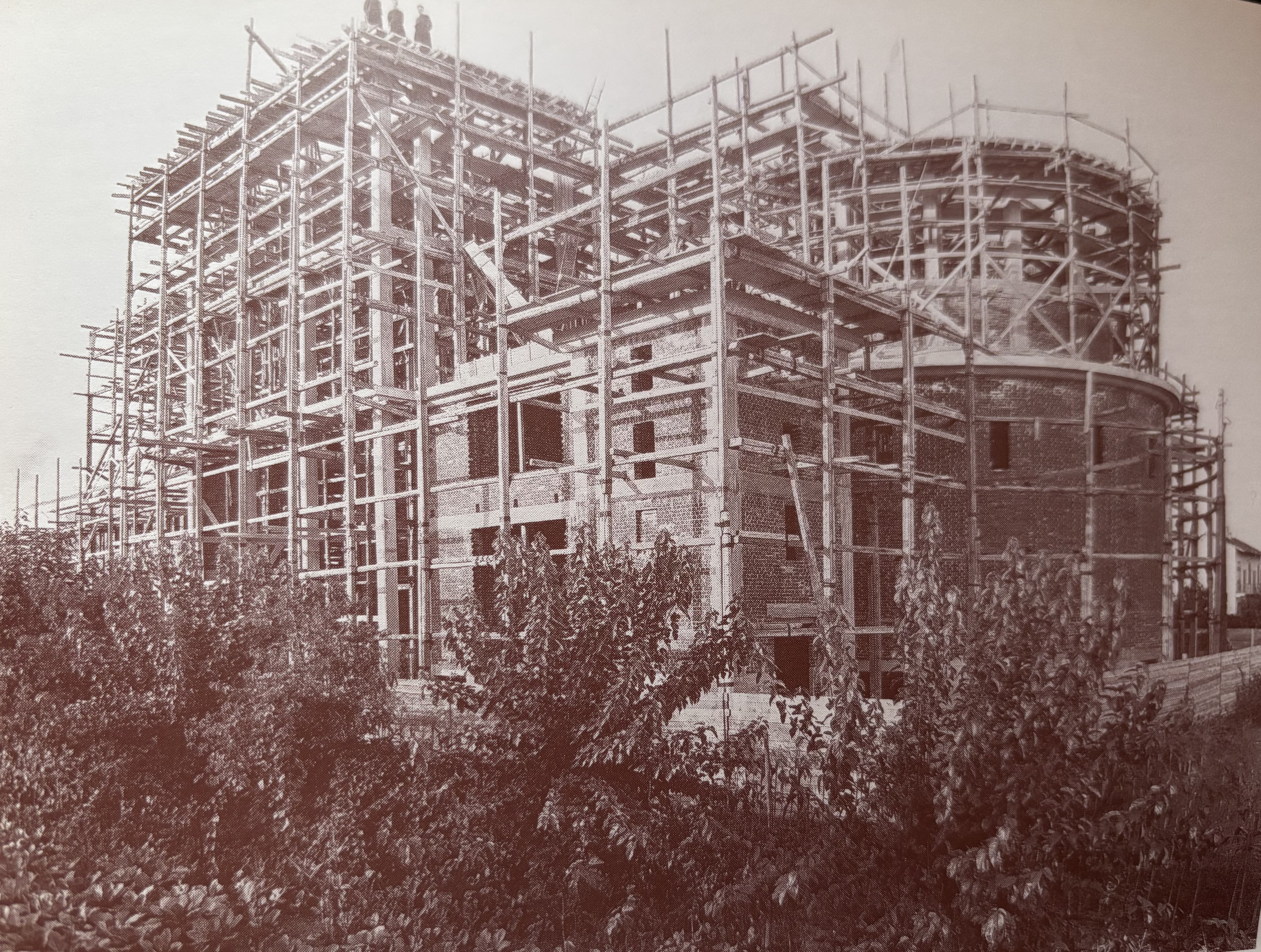
Construction of the apse

The exterior is covered with bare brick. The church also has a portico by the entrance, with two memorials dedicated to Edoardo Gabardi, constructed in 1942, and to Don Ambrogio Gianotti, constructed in 1971. The portico was constructed in 1941. By the entrance there are 6 statues, which (in the original design) were meant to be placed on the roof of the portico (Note: Like Saint Edward, the statues represent monarchs who became saints. They include Saint Stephen of Hungary, Saint Ferdinand of Castille, Saint Louis of France, and King David.). The portico was restored and renovated in May 2026. The church was meant to have a decorated Tympanum, which would have depicted various scenes of Jesus Christ's life, but due to lack of funds this could not be achieved. On the portico, above the entrance, the words 'D. O. M. AC D. ÆDUARDO REGUMQUE REGIS CONF.' which translate to To God and to King Edward the confessor, king of kings. In October 2026, plans for the construction of a piazza, located behind the apse of the church, were announced.

=== Bell tower ===
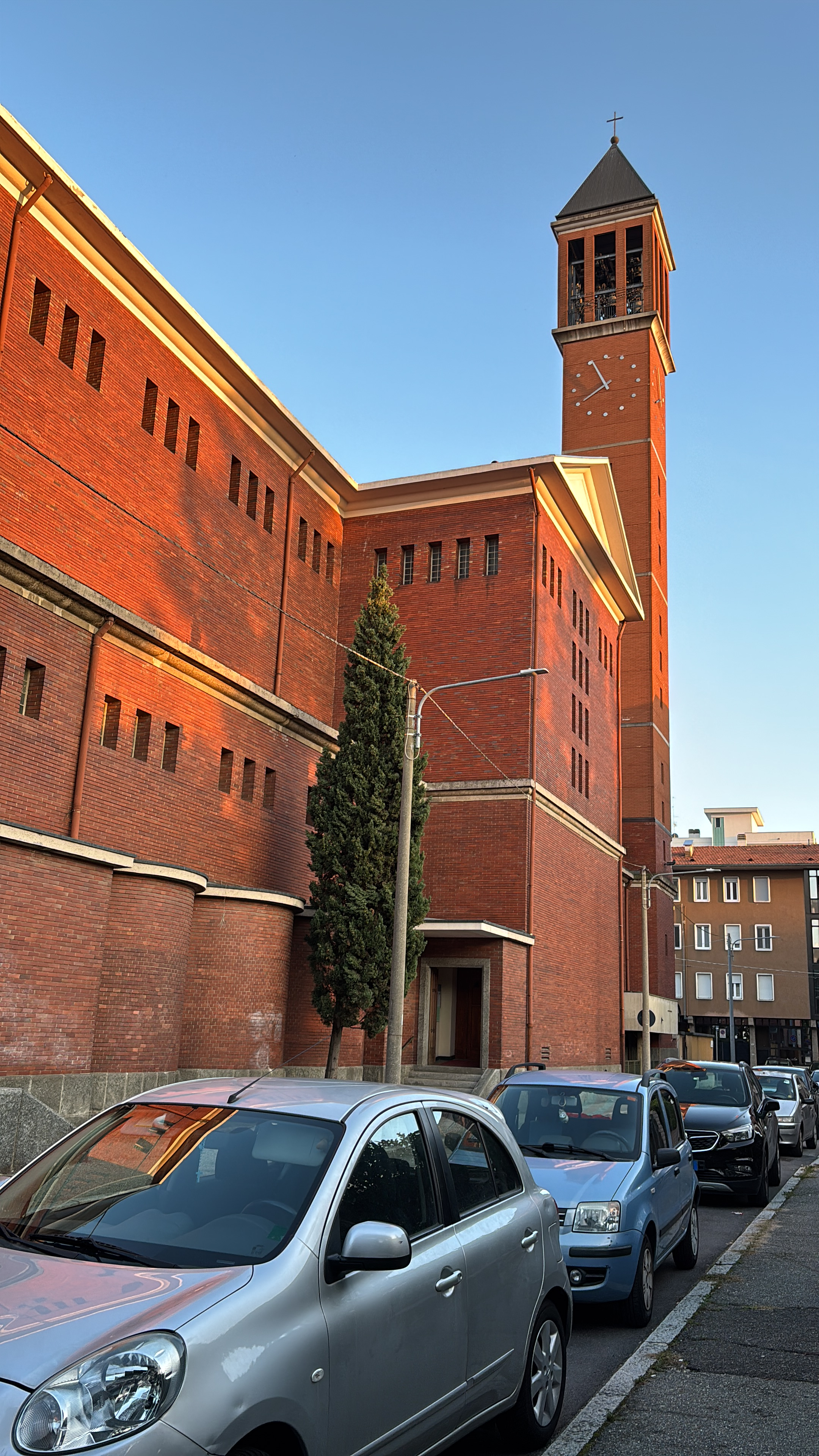
The bell tower of the church of Saint Edward

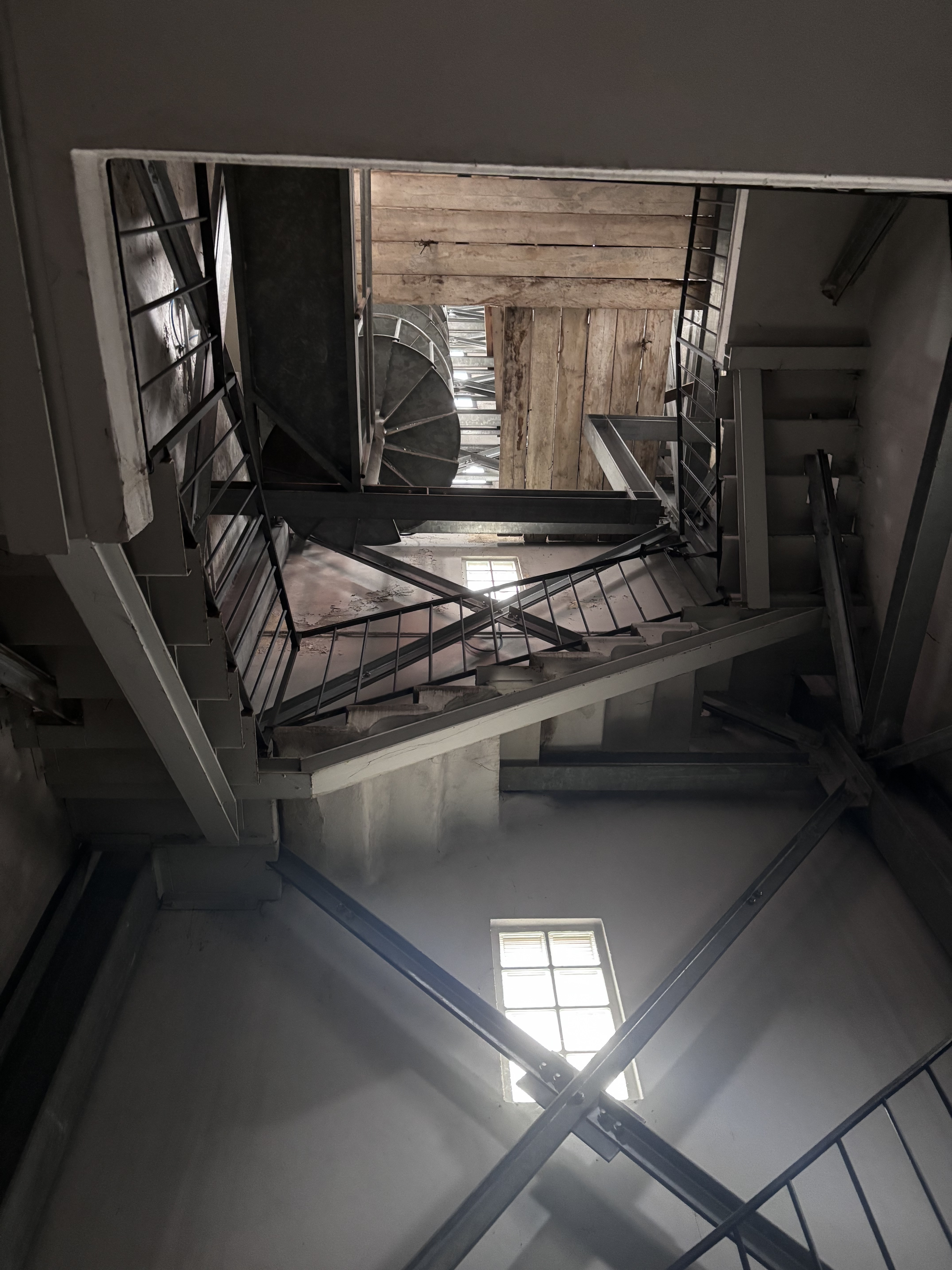
The interior of the bell tower

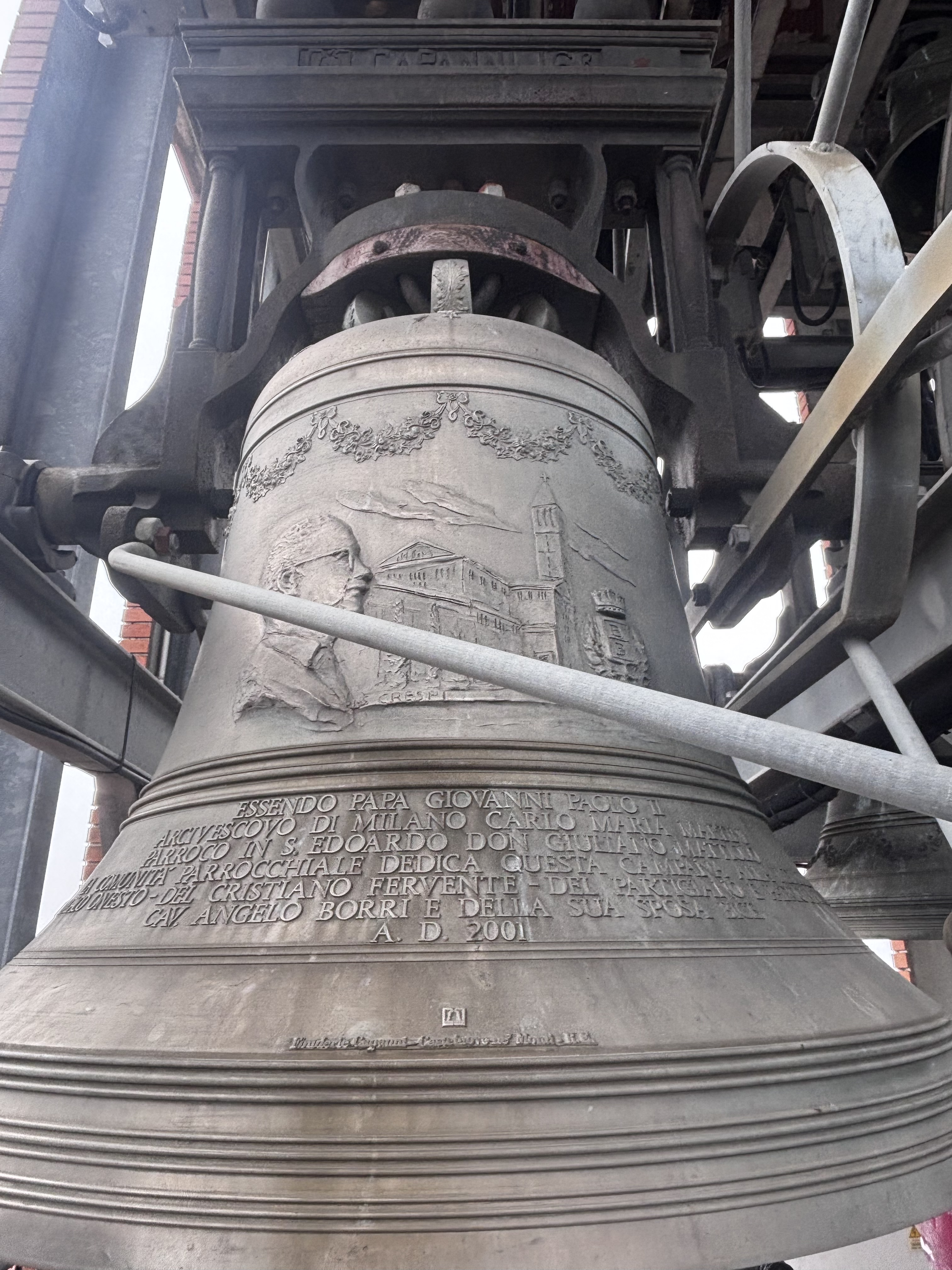
One of the bells

Construction of the bell tower began in 2002, and concluded in 2003. The construction of the steel frame though began in 1946, but due to lack of funds it wasn't completed for another 57 years. It has the same style of bare brick like the church. There are 11 bells. On the side of the bell tower, facing the road, there are two plaques, one commemorating the church's involvement in the liberation of Italy, and the other commemorating the construction of the bell tower. Standing at 52 meters, the bell tower is the tallest in Busto Arsizio. In 2024, the bell tower was opened for the first time to the public since its construction, with guided tours being offered one weekend a year.

== Relics ==
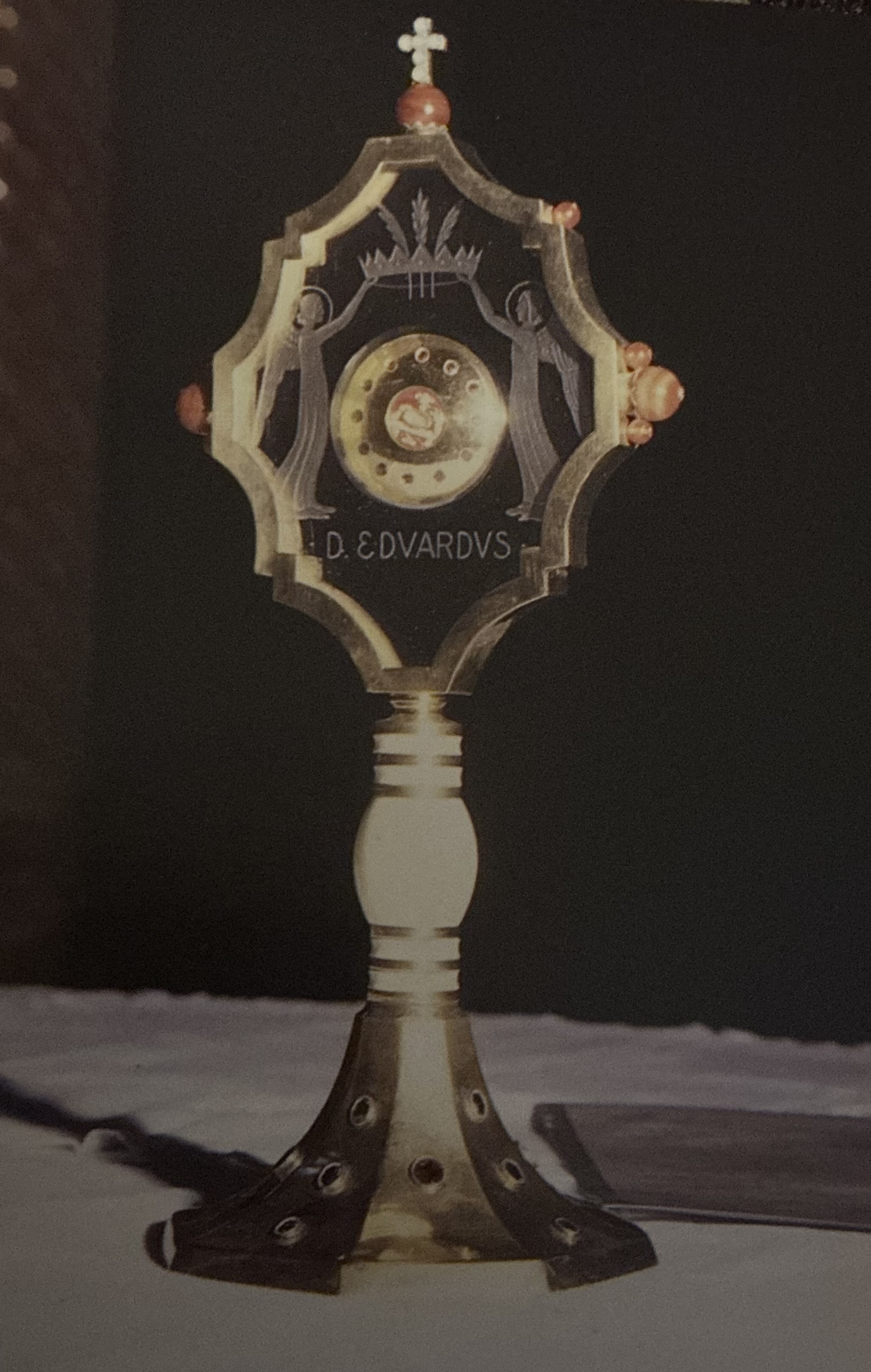
The reliquary containing the relic of Sant’Edoardo

The church contains various relics: including that of St. Edward, which is a small bone fragment, and several fabrics said to have been a part of the clothing worn by the Three Magi. The relic of St. Edward is located in a reliquary made of glass designed by the Beato Angelico school and Ernesto Bergagna. The relics of the Magi are located in the main altar. The relics are rarely shown to the public. In the past they [the relics] were used during processions or events such as the Feast of St. Edward.

== Parish priests ==
Below is the list of parish priests of the church of Saint Edward:

- Don Ambrogio Gianotti (1947–1969) (Note: Between 1938–1947, Gianotti served as a priest of the church. It was only in 1947, when the church was granted status as an independent parish that Gianotti became parish priest.)
- Don Eugenio Bertolotti (1969–1992)
- Don Giovanni Mariano (1992–2000)
- Don Giuliano Mattiolo (2000–2011)
- Don Emilio Sorte (2011–2019)
- Don Antonio Corvi (2019–)

== Notable people ==
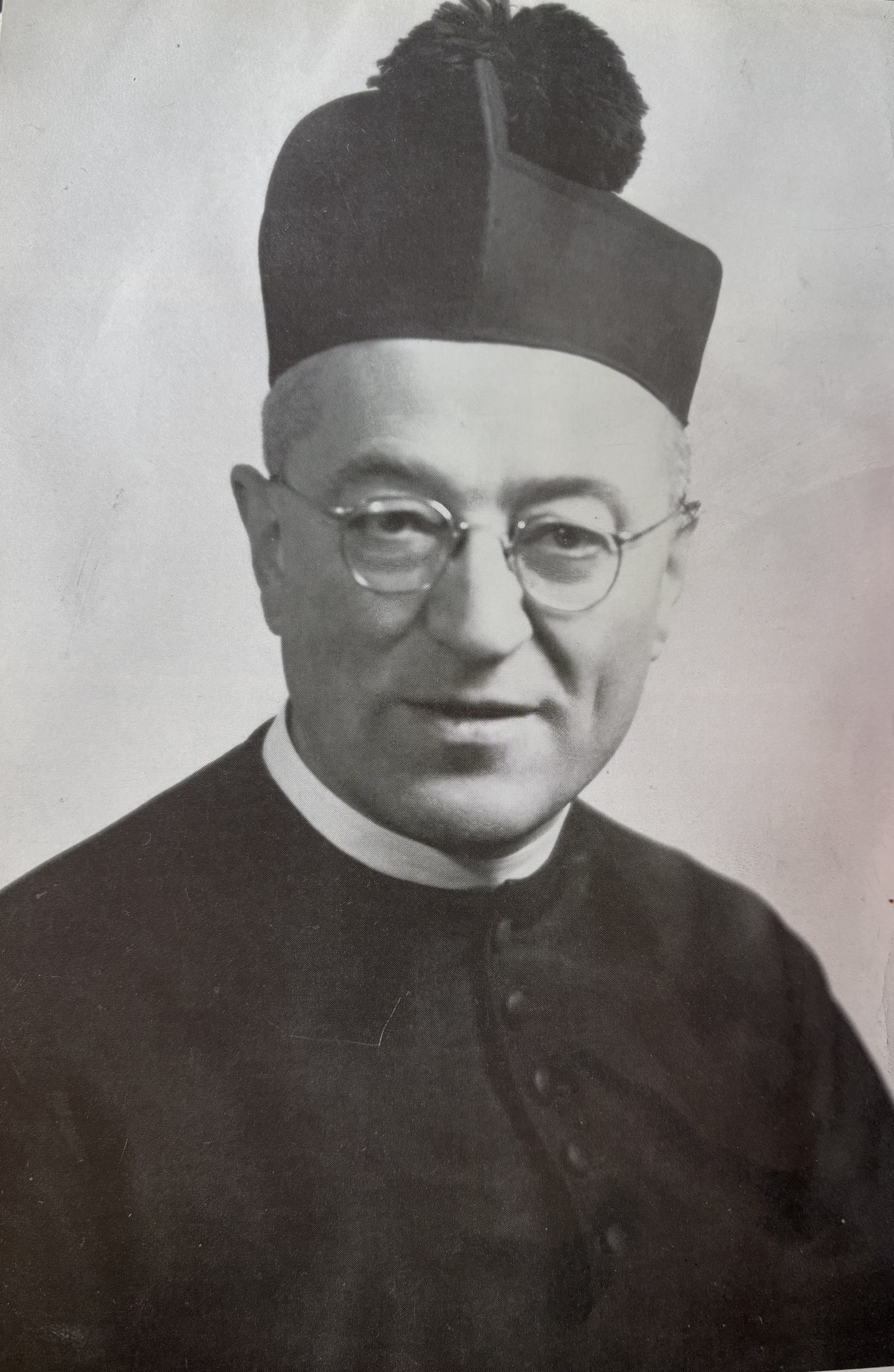
Don Ambrogio Gianotti

- Don Ambrogio Gianotti (1901–1969), first priest of St. Edward, partigiano.
- Giovanni Marcora (1922–1983), Italian politician and partigiano, frequently attended mass at the church and lived in the neighbourhood during the war.
- Angelo Borri (1919–2001), Mayor of Busto Arsizio from 1979 to 1985, lived in Sant'Edoardo and was known for being an active parishioner.
- Nicolò Prandelli, footballer, son of Cesare Prandelli, was married in the church in 2010.
- Edoardo Gabardi (1871–1962), Italian businessman and philanthropist, funded the church's construction.
