= Castoldi =

Castoldi may refer to:

Business

- Castoldi (company), a French automobile manufacturing company
- Baldini & Castoldi, an Italian publishing house

People

- Mario Castoldi (1888-1968), an Italian aeronautical engineer and aircraft designer
- Pietro Antonio Crespi Castoldi (1557 - 1615), Italian historian and Catholic priest
- Ray Castoldi (b. ?), an American organist noted for playing at sports events
