= La Famiglia Bustocca =

Italian cultural association

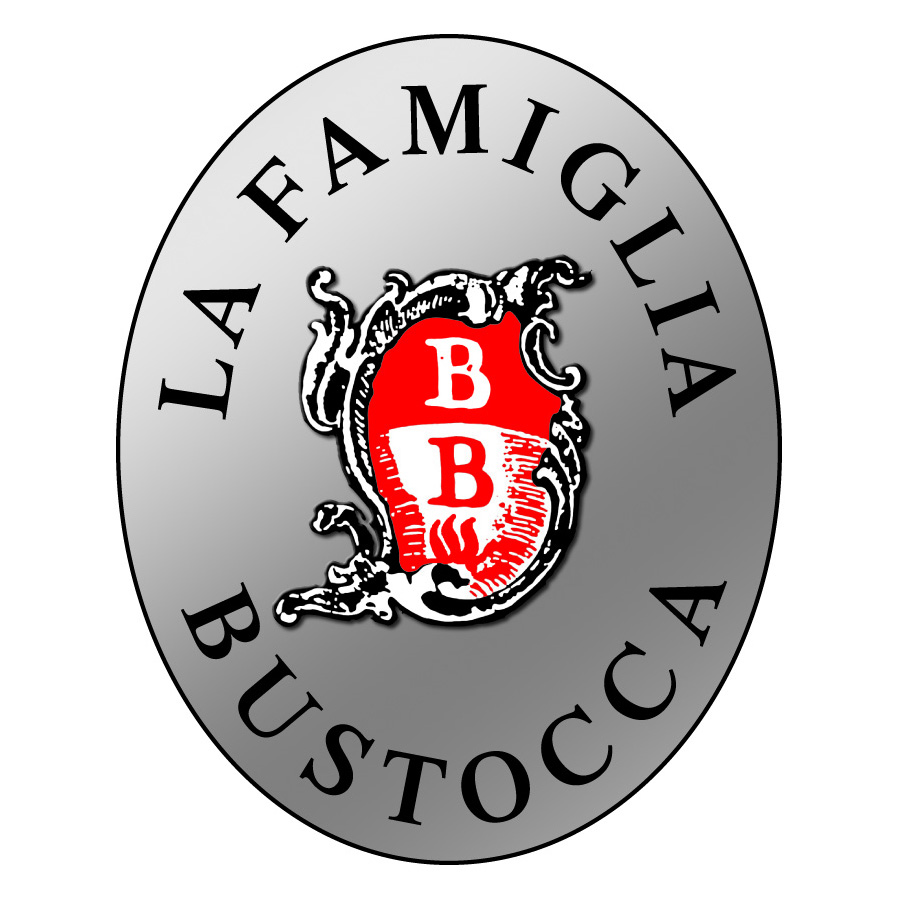
- Formation: 13 March 1951
- Founders: Luigi Bellotti; Angelo Bottigelli; Enrico Crespi; Bruno Grampa; Nino Miglierina; Raffaele Montoli
- Purpose: Culture and traditions in Busto Arsizio and Bustocco dialect
- Headquarters: Busto Arsizio
- Coordinates: 45.61400°N 8.85405°E
- Official language: Italian
- Regiù: Silvio Accomando
- Main organ: Consiglio
- Website: lafamigliabustocca.org

La Famiglia Bustocca (in English: "The Bustocco Family") is an Italian cultural association with headquarters in Busto Arsizio, Province of Varese, Lombardy, in front of Palazzo Gilardoni, the Town Hall.

== History ==
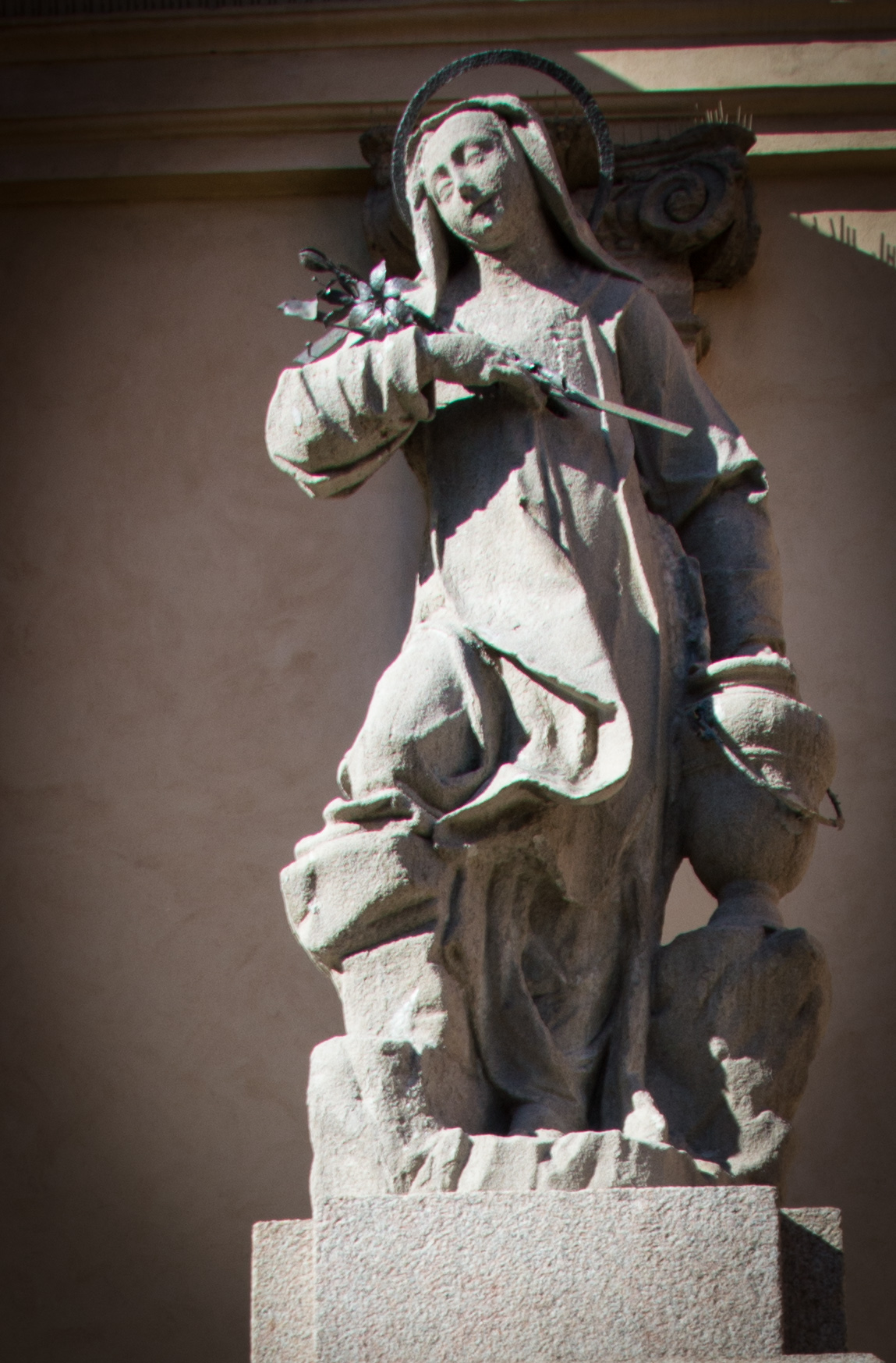
Statue of Blessed Giuliana Puricelli, patron of the association, restored by La Famiglia Bustocca

The idea to create an association with the scope to preserve the traditions and spread the culture of the city of Busto Arsizio, born in 1950 by a group of six citizens with a passion for the History and the culture of Busto Arsizio. The purpose was also to keep alive the Bustocco dialect which has the advantage of clearly distinct from those of neighbouring towns, such as to constitute a linguistic island in itself.

Founder members who on 13 March 1951 gave birth to the association were Luigi Bellotti, Angelo Bottigelli, Enrico Crespi, Bruno Grampa, Nino Miglierina and Raffaele Montoli. The Statute was approved by Member Assembly on 22 April 1952. As patron of the association was chosen, Blessed Giuliana of Busto.

During its years of activity, La Famiglia Bustocca collected books and publications related to Busto Arsizio, its History, its dialect and its customs and traditions, by authors and researchers not only local.

Every year the association offers to its members the Almanacco della Famiglia Bustocca, a publication with articles and papers about local art and history, personality and events in Busto Arsizio. This publication every year is required from important libraries in Milan, Rome, Florence, Venice and from libraries of the neighbouring towns.

=== Founder Members ===
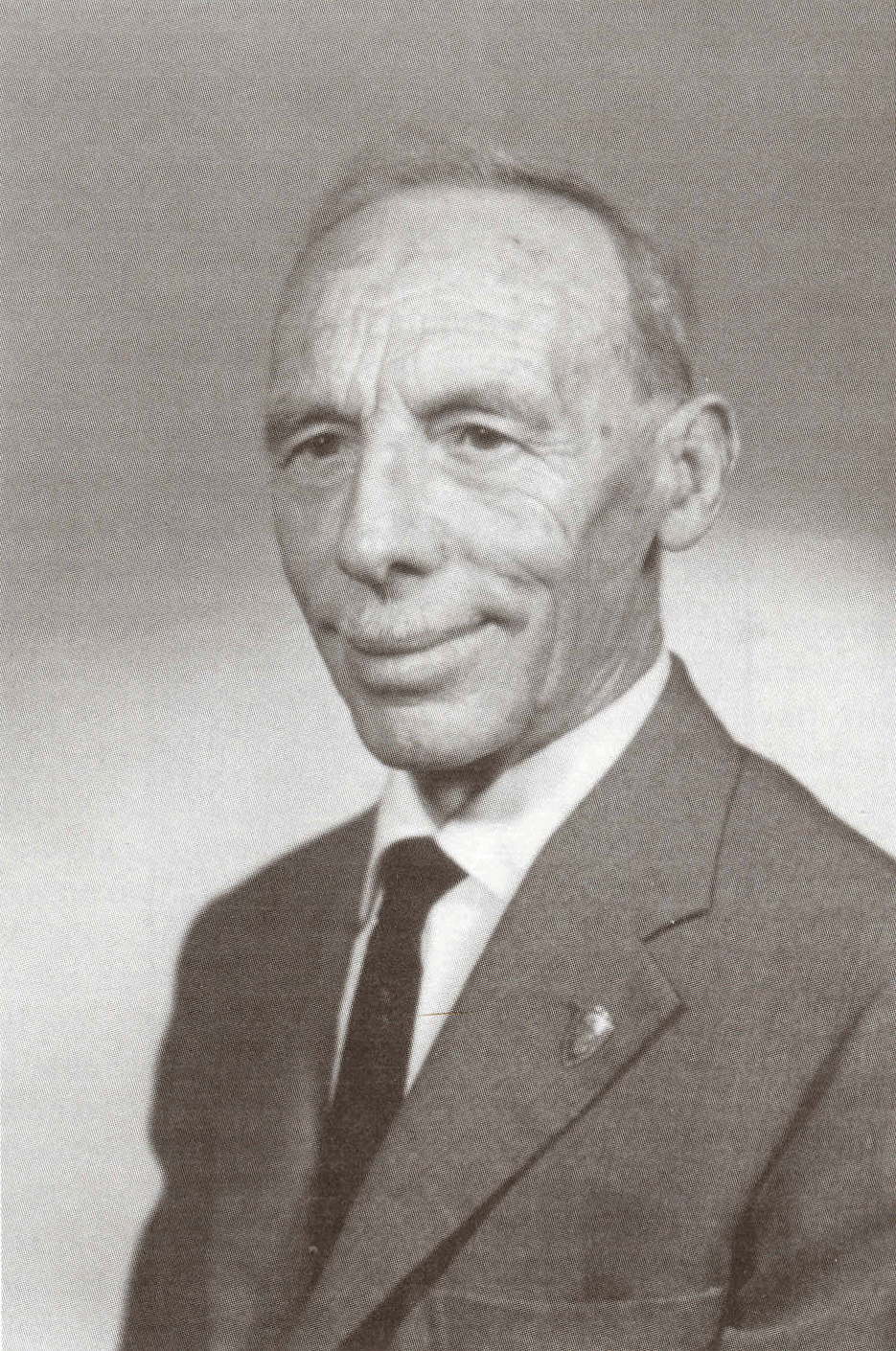
Luigi Bellotti, Founder Member and first Regiù of the association

- Luigi Bellotti
- Angelo Bottigelli
- Enrico Crespi
- Bruno Grampa
- Nino Miglierina
- Raffaele Montoli

=== Council ===
The Consiglio (council) consists of nine elements: Regiù (president), vice-Regiù, treasurer, secretary and five missé (councillors). The council is elected by members, while the positions of the councillors are divided among the elected members during the first board meeting.

==== Regiù ====
In La Famiglia Bustocca, the president takes the name of Regiù, term in Bustocco dialect which means pater familias (father of the family).

Since 1951, the Regiù were:

- Luigi Bellotti (1951–1963)
- Bruno Grampa (1964–1965)
- Narciso Ceriotti (1965–1986)
- Aldo Speranza (1986–1996)
- Michele Crespi (1997–2008)
- Ettore Ceriani (2008–2011)
- Luigi Toia (2011–2013)
- Chiara Massazza (2013 – August 2015)
- Silvio Accomando (September 2015 - June 2020)
- Mariella Toia (June 2020 - in office)

== Honors ==
- Civic merit from City of Busto Arsizio (24 June 2005)

== See also ==
- History of Busto Arsizio
