= History of Busto Arsizio =

History of the municipality of Busto Arsizio, Italy

The history of Busto Arsizio, according to the hypotheses advanced by some historians and later re-proposed by local history scholars, would have seen its beginnings with the Ligurians. The later presence of the Romans, mentioned by many authors, is shown by the town's urban distribution.

Known in the early Middle Ages for the tanning of hides, the first mention of the city dates from 1053, when the name Bvsti is mentioned on a plaque located in the Basilica of Sant'Ambrogio in Milan.

By decree of Cardinal Charles Borromeo, on April 4, 1583, Busto Arsizio, then under the rule of Duke Filippo Maria Visconti, was detached from the Vicariate of Seprio and placed at the head of what until then had been the Parish of Olgiate Olona. From that time it thus had its own podestà.

The origins of the activity that made the town a major textile center date back to the Middle Ages: in 1375 "one can hear a loom in almost every house," as testified a few centuries later by historian Pietro Antonio Crespi Castoldi in his history of Busto Arsizio (De Oppido Busti Relationes).

In the second half of the nineteenth century the development of the town outside the defensive walls began, along the strà Balon (present-day Corso XX Settembre) and the Garottola road (present-day Via Mameli). On October 30, 1864, Busto Arsizio was granted the title of city in the Kingdom of Italy. Due to the intense activity of the entrepreneur Enrico dell'Acqua, it acquired the dual profile of cotton and mechanical town in the late nineteenth century, thus securing its economic well-being.

Many entrepreneurs built their villas in the style in vogue in the early twentieth century, Art Nouveau, still an important part of Busto's architectural heritage. Beginning in 1928, the city's history became intertwined with that of two other former municipalities, Sacconago and Borsano, which became neighborhoods. Today Busto Arsizio is a modern industrial and commercial center of more than 83,000 inhabitants, located in one of the most industrialized areas in Europe, the Alto Milanese.

== Hypotheses on the origins ==
Busto Arsizio, according to some hypotheses, has Ligurian origins. The Ligurians, to obtain space for the cultivation of vines and some cereals, as well as for the construction of stone huts covered with straw roofs, used the technique of slash-and-burn: that is, they set fire to the forest that then covered the entire Po Valley. Also in what was later called Silva longa, they made a Bustum, or new settlement, which was the beginning of what is now the city of Busto Arsizio. This settlement developed near the Tenore stream, a watercourse that, in ancient times, had a greater and more constant water flow than it does today. The stream, coming from the moraine hills of the lower Varesotto area, flowed down along today's Bellini and Montebello streets.

According to these hypotheses, evidence that Busto Arsizio constituted a fossilized Ligurian island on Lombard land would also come from the study of the Busto dialect. The facts would date back to prehistoric times, when the lands from the Rhône to the Camonica Valley were inhabited by Ligurian tribes. Their language in the second half of the first millennium B.C. was transformed first by the Gallic domination, which, however, did not penetrate everywhere equally (in the case of Busto Arsizio the traces are scarce), and then by the deeper and more incisive one of the Romans. Busto Arsizio, therefore, would have constituted for a long time a Ligurian enclave immersed in the Insubrian land and would therefore have had only modest contact with those Celtic populations that arrived in various waves from central Europe by crossing the Alps. Nevertheless, some ancient districts of the city, such as Sciornago, show typical Celtic endings. The same can be said of Sacconago and Borsano, whose suffixes "-ago" and "-ano," along with "-ate" (found in the nearby town of Gallarate), were characteristic of the Insubrians.

The fact that the area was inhabited in Roman times is indicated, according to some, by the regular pattern of the streets in the historic center, and by the discovery of some late Roman objects, probably from the period between the second and fourth centuries CE. From an administrative point of view, it was part of the regio XI Transpadana. A reliable temporal placement of an early Roman settlement is around 200 B.C., when the Celts were defeated and subdued; with the reclamation of the Upper Milanese area, an agricultural colony of Busto was founded.

On the territory of Busto Arsizio (but far from the built-up area), in Roman times, passed the Via Severiana Augusta, a Roman consular road that connected Mediolanum (modern Milan) with the Verbannus Lacus (Lake Verbano, i.e. Lake Maggiore), and from there to the Simplon Pass (lat. Summo Plano).

== Early Middle Ages ==
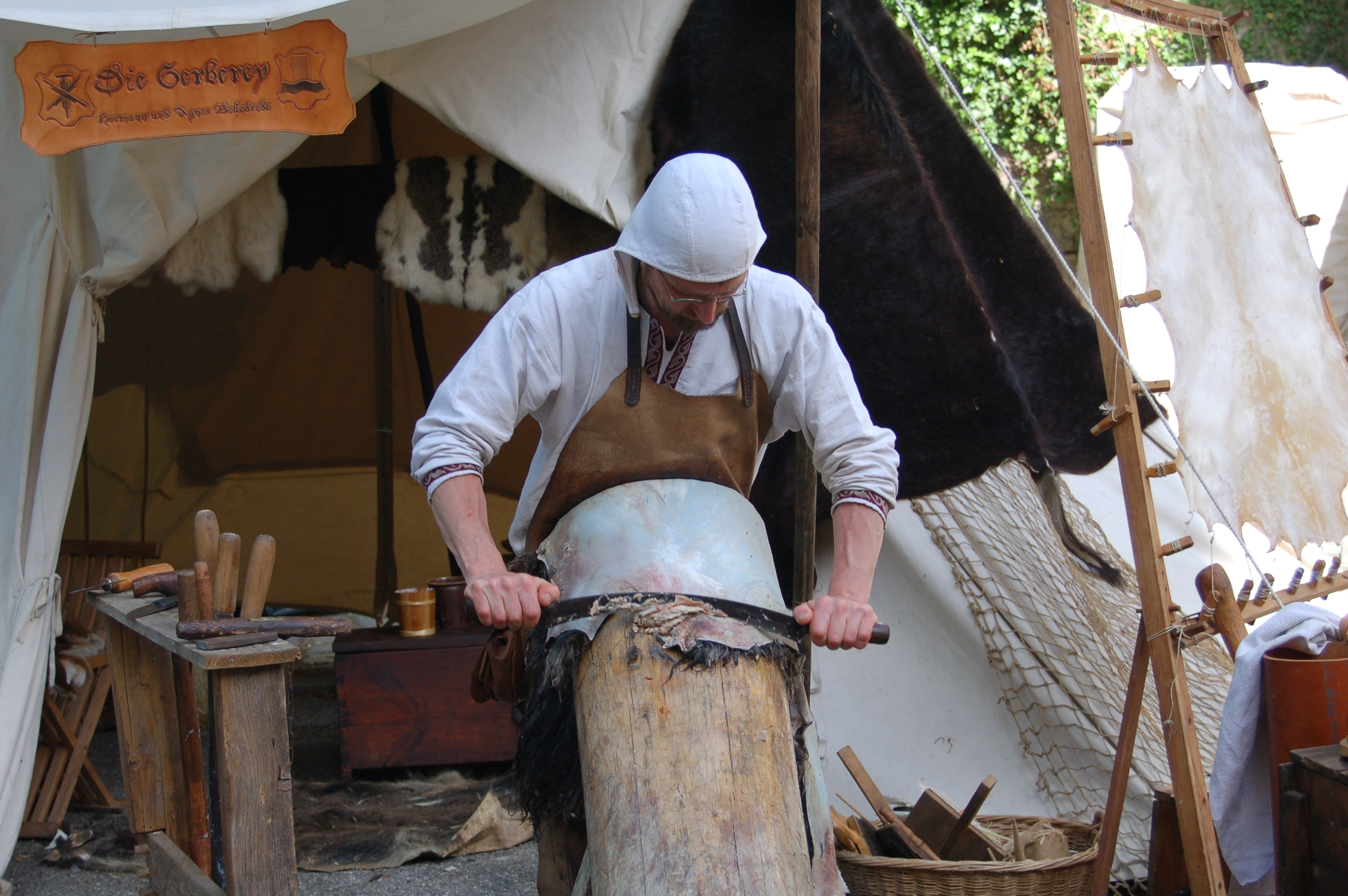
Tanning of hides in a historical reconstruction

Known in the early Middle Ages for the tanning of hides, the first mention of the town dates back to 1053, when the name Bvsti is mentioned on a plaque located in the Basilica of Sant'Ambrogio in Milan. Other mentions are from the 12th century, in two documents from 1119 and 1140.

During this period the locus Busti followed the fortunes of today's Castelseprio, a center that experienced a period of considerable splendor after the barbarian invasions. The Lombards, starting in the 6th century, made it the most important stronghold in the region north of Milan. Lombard's rule dealt aa death blow to the surviving Roman institutions and established a new political, civil and economic order that was already almost feudal in nature.

Lombard's rule ceased when Charlemagne defeated King Desiderius, whose fall occurred in 774. Lombard institutions were replaced by those of the Franks: the dukes were opposed by counts and marquises, and feudalism was imminent.

Regarding the Carolingian period and the subsequent period of the kingdoms of Italy, there is a lack, as far as Busto Arsizio is concerned, of documentation. The locus Busti continued to be part of the contado of Seprio, which became so powerful that it had its own mint. As far as ecclesiastical institutions were concerned, Busto Arsizio depended on Olgiate Olona, the head parish.

== Late Middle Ages ==
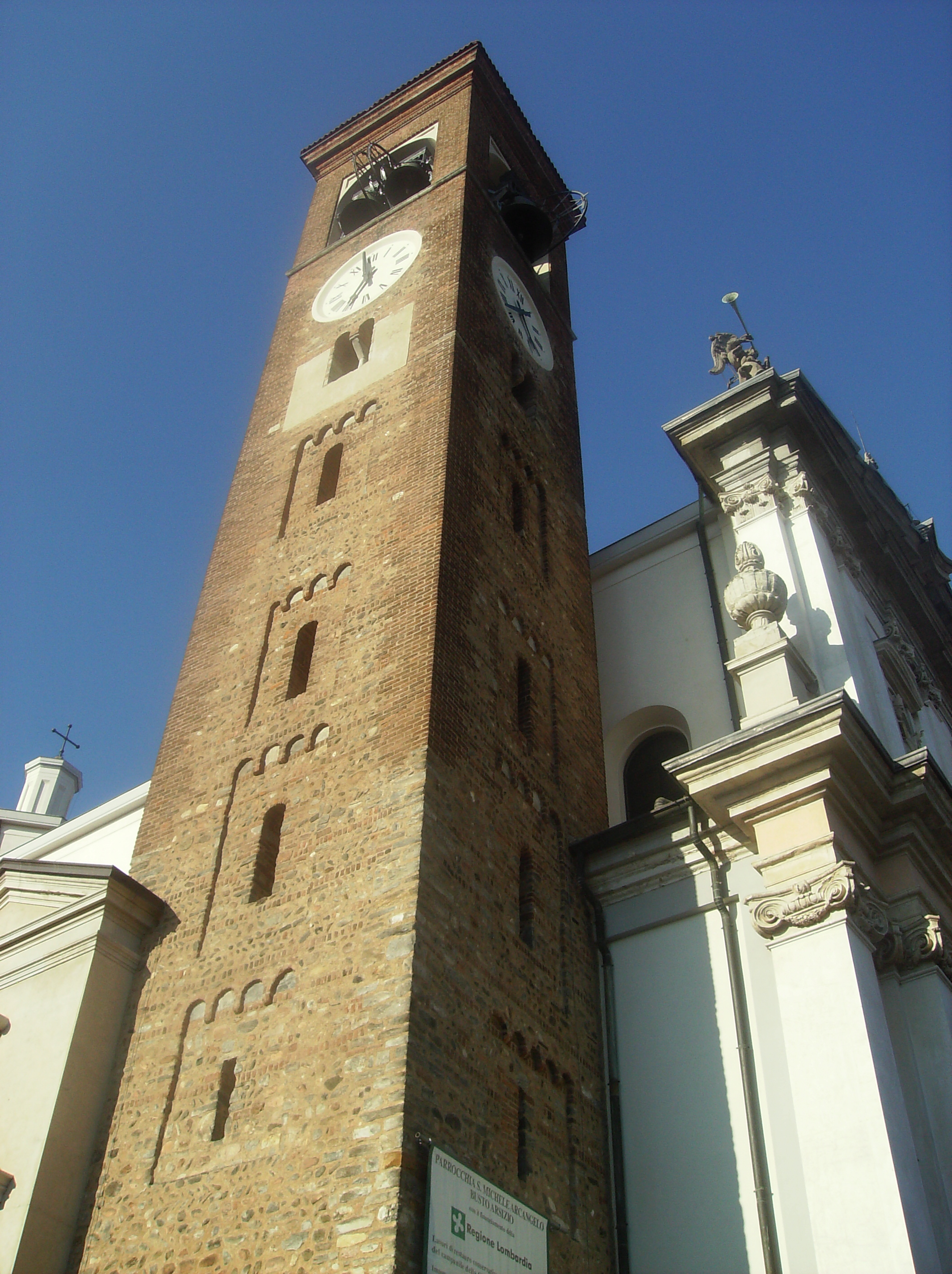
Bell tower of St. Michael the Archangel, the base of which dates back to the years around 1000

The oldest building still standing in the town is the base of the bell tower of the church of St. Michael the Archangel, dating back to the 9th or 10th century. The dedication of the church to St. Michael the Archangel, whose cult was particularly widespread among the Lombards, has led to the assumption of an original settlement of that population near the church, which in its present phase must have replaced an older, smaller building of worship. The presence of a fortification is consistent with the location of the site, which is at the highest point of the ancient municipal territory, and with the appellation of borgo, assumed in medieval times by the ancient locus Busti.

Around the year 1000, the locus Busti was a fief of a family of captains from Milan, had a castle, and began to influence the struggles between the people, minor feudal lords, and militia. The Milanese chronicler Galvaneo Fiamma stated that among the supporters of Archbishop Ariberto d'Intimiano in the struggles against the minor nobles were the captains of Busto Arsizio, who like all captains were against communal liberties.

The autonomy of the contado of Seprio was threatened by the growing power of the commune of Milan. This situation favored attempts by Busto Arsizio to evade the count's jurisdiction. This was the period just before the formation of the Lombard League, founded in 1167 to counter Frederick I Barbarossa in his attempt to expand imperial influence in the Po region. Three years earlier, on June 9, 1164, Frederick I granted Rainald of Dassel, archbishop of Cologne and arch-chancellor of the Holy Roman Empire, a fief that included the parish of Dairago (with the ancient commune of Capopieve and large territories in the area), Busto Arsizio, (part of the parish of Olgiate Olona) and Bernate. Frederick I was defeated in the Battle of Legnano, fought on May 29, 1176. The early stages of the clash had as its theater the countryside between Busto Arsizio and Borsano, or, according to other sources, the area between Borsano and Legnano. Among others, the so-called Company of Death took part in the battle, which included a large number of people from Busto.

The 12th century in Busto was characterized by the growth of the borough, which saw the phenomenon, common to much of Italy, of the formation of the social group of the bourgeoisie taking place within it. Strengthened by their economic status, the bourgeoisie (merchants, landowners and homeowners) wanted to take an active part in public life.

The town was fortified, being provided with defensive walls and a moat. The Tenore was diverted and led into the eastern moat (present Manzoni Square), where the castle was located. At the height of Porta Piscina, one of the four Busto gates (the others were Porta Savico, Porta Basilica and Porta Sciornago), a small canal was created, running along the contrada Piscina (present-day Via Matteotti). This one with regular flow went to feed a pool in the center of Piazza Santa Maria, called Piscina, which was essential for the population's water supply. The Piscina also had an outfall, which collected the drains from the public market. It ran along what is now Bambaia Street (which until the nineteenth century had the name contrada del Riale) and eventually dispersed into some fields southeast of the village, which were thus irrigated.

At the end of the twelfth century and the beginning of the subsequent one, as stated in the Statuti della compartizione delle strade e delle fagie, the locus was in charge of 1526 braccia on the Rho road, one of the six roads that led to the six main gates of Milan and along which the six districts (called "fagge") had been aggregated. In 1212, the consuls of the fagge were created, and Busto Arsizio was assigned to the I Consulate of Porta Ticinese and Vercellina, which included the Upper Milanese territory between the Ticino and Olona rivers.

At the beginning of the 13th century, the first parish portion of the town was created in San Giovanni. From the first half of the century is the news of a monastic community of Humiliati Sisters located in the Contrada Basilica, while the town developed economically due to the textile production of fustian and bombazine. To this house, another one was added in 1278, located in Contrada Platea.

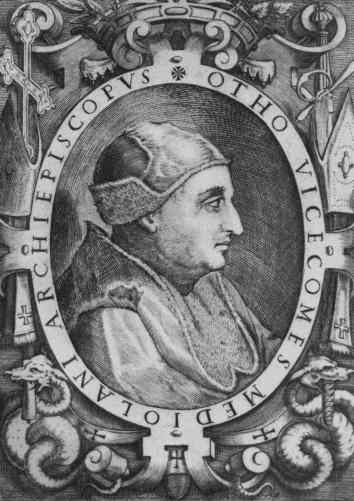
Bishop Ottone Visconti, under whom Busto Arsizio was elevated to the rank of borgo in 1287

In 1287, after yet another reconquest, the archbishop of Milan Ottone Visconti ordered the destruction of Castel Seprio, and Busto Arsizio thus rose to borgo status, an appellation for towns with a market and fortification.

The favor of the Viscontis, who had become imperial vicars, contributed to the improvement of conditions and the vigor of the town with the reconstruction by Alberto Confalonieri of the castle and walls. The townspeople built forts, gates and drawbridges. Given the generosity and religiosity of the people of Busto Arsizio, part of the growing wealth of the town was consecrated through benefices to the churches of St. John the Baptist, St. Michael the Archangel and St. Mary of Piazza.

In the 14th century, several confraternities and consortiums were active in the town that provided assistance to the sick, including the School of the Poor.

In 1343 San Michele was also endowed with a parish priest, for the care of the souls of the districts of Pessina and Sciornago (the latter half with San Giovanni, given the topography of the place). San Michele became an independent parish. From the middle of the century comes news of the creation of a second parish portion in San Giovanni.

In 1375 "almost in every house one hears a loom," as witnessed a few centuries later by historian Pietro Antonio Crespi Castoldi in his history of Busto Arsizio (De Oppido Busti Relationes).

In 1402 Gian Galeazzo Visconti, who, in 1395, had been elevated to the rank of Duke of Milan, died. The title and lordship over the vast Visconti estates passed to his eldest son Giovanni Maria Visconti, who was 13 years old, which is why the state was ruled by his widow Duchess Caterina. At that time the town, which was divided into the four contrade (Pessina, Sciornago, Basilica, and Savico), was subjected to serious threats by Facino Cane, who wanted to sack it. The inhabitants, on the afternoon of April 4, 1408, were summoned by the ringing of bells and rushed to the walls with the will to repel the aggressor. After closing the four gates of the village, a second rampart was built. A messenger, who asked to speak to the commander of the castle, was put to flight by a volley of arrows from the besieged. After other stratagems went awry, Facino Cane moved away from Busto Arsizio, thinking that it was better to direct his assaults to less fierce populations. The villagers attributed the victory to the intervention of the Holy Magi, to whom they dedicated the northern gate of Busto Arsizio.

In 1427, Giuliana Puricelli, declared blessed by Pope Benedict XIV and also remembered in a sonnet by Giuseppe Parini, was born in Busto territory, that is, at Cascina Verghera, later Cascina dei Poveri.

The creation of the third parish portion of San Giovanni is dated 1434. Six years later, in 1440, the first tribunal was established, granting the town's first podestà in loco the power to "settle any civil and criminal question or dispute, sum or value, and to adjudicate and apply pecuniary and corporal punishment up to and including extreme torture."

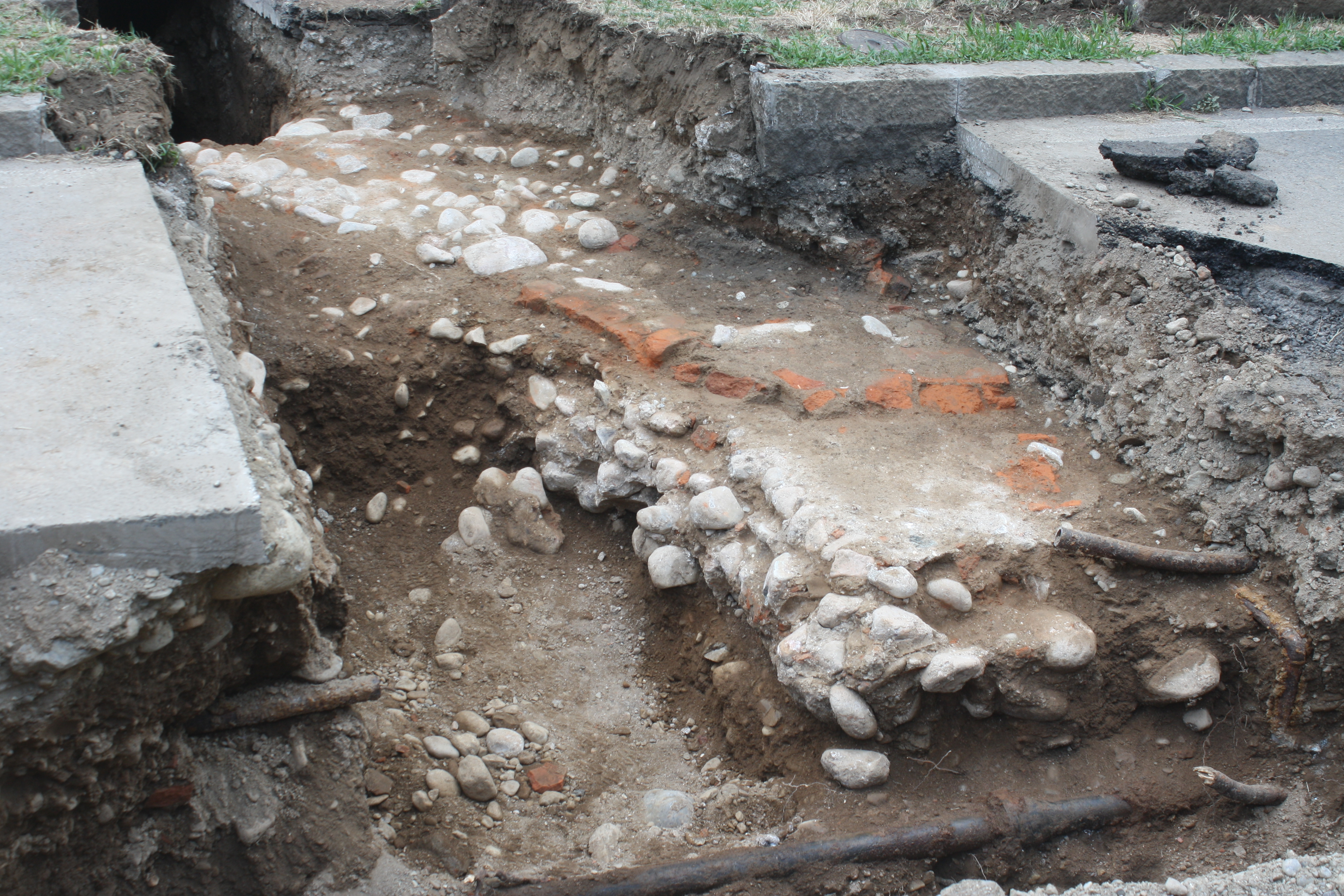
The remains of the pre-1500 fortifications of Busto Arsizio, discovered in 2019 near the Ottolini-Tovaglieri villa

After the tumultuous interlude, between 1447 and 1450, of the Ambrosian Republic, Busto Arsizio bargained for passage under Francesco Sforza by procuring the favors of the same duke, who confirmed to the townspeople the privilege of the podestà in loco and opposed the request made by the people of Gallarate who demanded that Busto Arsizio return under their vicariate. The town thus went through a period of intense splendor even under Sforza's rule, especially from an artistic and cultural point of view, despite the wars, devastation, looting, famine and plagues that accompanied Lombardy during the 16th century. As for the plague, there were other epidemics in 1451 and 1468. In addition, according to Crespi Castoldi, 1100 people died in Busto Arsizio between 1484 and 1485.

In 1488 Ludovico Sforza, seeing the importance that the village of Busto Arsizio had gained, elevated it to the rank of County, politically and legally subordinating Legnano to Busto and establishing the court in the village of Busto. Practically, Busto Arsizio became the capital of the area. A humanistic cultural environment was thus formed towards the end of the century, following the example of the Sforza court in Milan. In Busto Arsizio, the Middle Ages ended four years early.

== 16th century ==
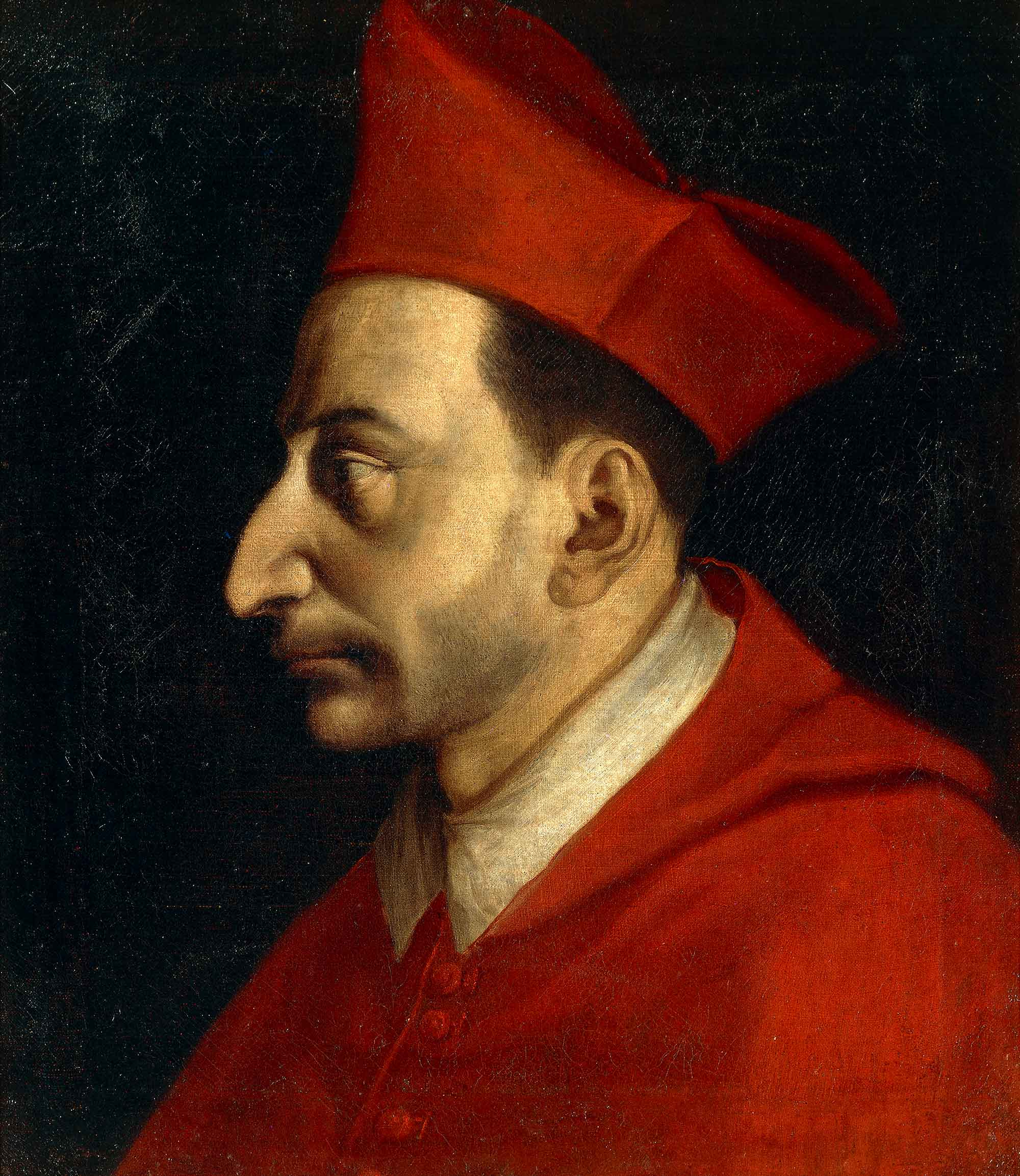
Archbishop St. Charles Borromeo. In 1583 he ordered the transport of the parish seat from Olgiate Olona to Busto Arsizio, following his pastoral visit.

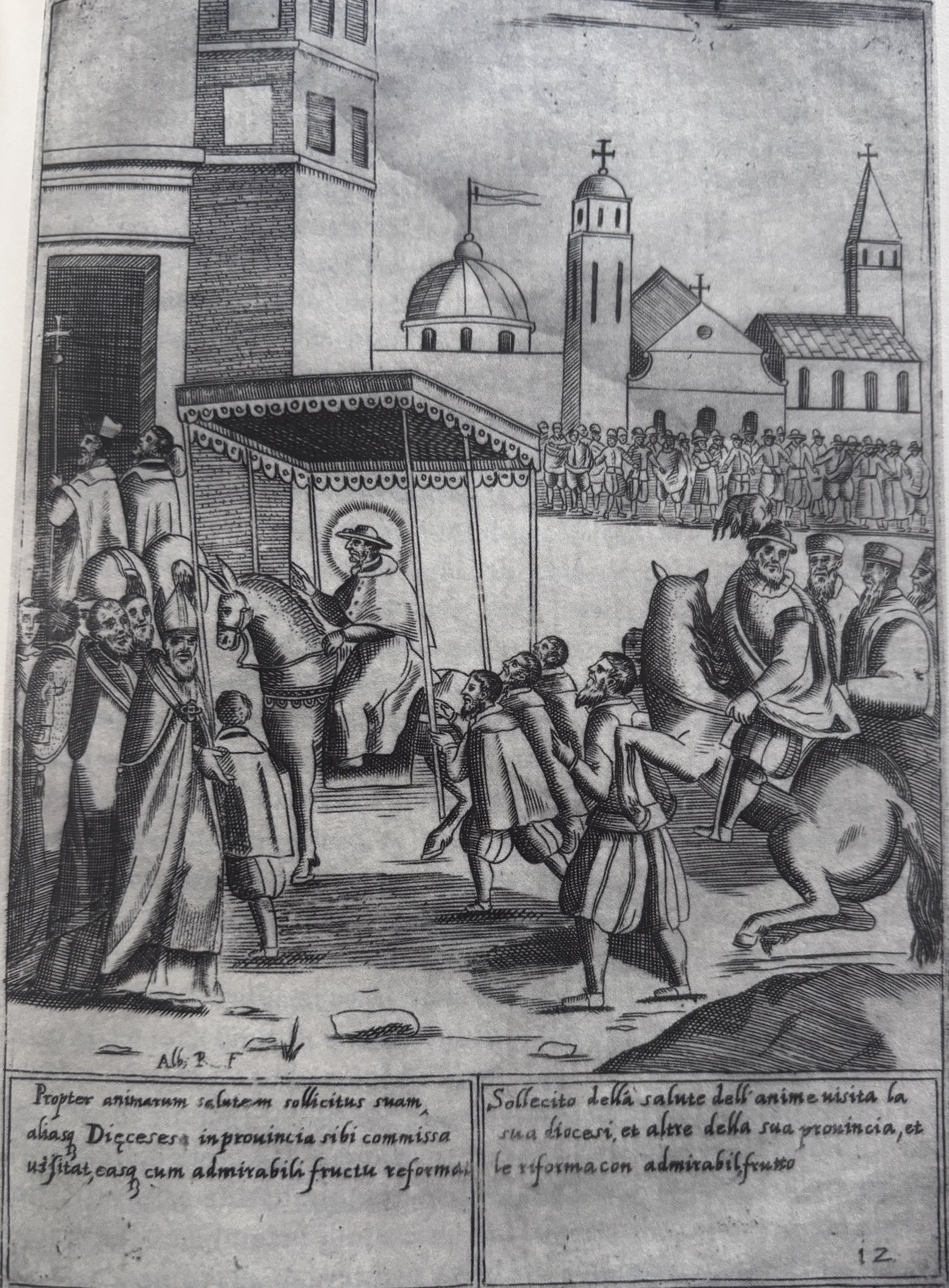
San Carlo Borromeo’s visit to Busto Arsizio in 1583. In the background the churches of San Michele, San Giovanni, and Santa Maria are shown.

In the 16th century, Busto Arsizio was renowned for the production of fustian, but the main occupation of the inhabitants remained agriculture; crops were mainly grain and wine.

In 1511, the Austrians of the Holy League defeated the French there.

In 1512 the second parish portion of San Michele, the fifth in the village, was created. The first parish priest was Crespolo Crespi.

In 1524 a major plague epidemic took place in the territory, causing the death of 5,000 inhabitants of the town. In 1535 Francesco II Sforza died leaving no descendants, and the lineage died out. Thus ended the period of local rule and began the one of subjugation to the foreigner. In 1540, under Spanish rule, which had already begun under the last Sforza, there was a new plague epidemic, which caused severe damage to the population.

In the course of the century, the School of the Poor, which was responsible for caring for the sick, absorbed the other associations and confraternities in the sector; on September 22, 1566, by Papal bull, the Cascina dei Poveri, belonging to the School, was made autonomous.

After the death, in Lyon, of Count Luigi Visconti of Busto Arsizio without leaving male heirs, the County of Busto Arsizio returned to the Milanese ducal Chamber and was claimed in 1568 by Pietro Antonio Marliani. In 1569, a direct survey of the area was carried out to assess the town's assets, which revealed that it was surrounded by a moat and a rampart and had a population of around 3500. In 1573, when Gabriele de' Turati was "consul" of Busto Arsizio, Senator Pietro Antonio Marliani became interested in the town again and beat the offers of competitors at the Royal Chamber. Only after the conclusion of several disputes with some nobles who did not want to give allegiance to Marliani was the Royal Senate able to approve the enfeoffment six years after the request, and Paolo Camillo Marliani became the new feudal lord of Busto Arsizio.

As for the population, in 1574 a figure of 3007 inhabitants divided into 515 households is given, several of which were patriarchal in structure, a figure that made Busto Arsizio the most populous center in the Upper Milanese area.

In 1576, Archbishop Charles Borromeo united the nuns of the old or Santa Maria Maddalena monastery of Busto Arsizio, of Benedictine rule, with the nuns of the new or San Girolamo monastery, of Augustinian rule, founded by Orsina Caniani in the mid-15th century. At the time of the union, the archbishop imposed the Benedictine rule on the new monastery. The same year is also remembered for the plague of St. Charles, which, however, was less strong in Busto Arsizio than in the Milan area.

By decree of Cardinal Charles Borromeo, on April 4, 1583, Busto Arsizio was detached from the Vicariate of Seprio and placed at the head of what until then had been the parish of Olgiate Olona with its own podestà. The archbishop, during a pastoral visit, had noted the irremediable decadence of Olgiate Olona, which then numbered about 600 inhabitants, in contrast to the thriving religious and civic life of Busto Arsizio and its more than 3,000 inhabitants. The parish of Busto Arsizio included the following municipalities: Cairate, Fagnano Olona, Solbiate Olona, Olgiate Olona, Castellanza, Sacconago and Villa Cortese on the west bank of the Olona and Gorla Maggiore, Gorla Minore, Prospiano, Marnate, Castegnate, Rescalda and Cislago on the east bank. In 1594 there were official data on the inhabitants, who numbered around 5400. The average age was just over 26.

The prefect of the monastery of Busto Arsizio had the church of Santa Maria Maddalena, erected in the 15th century for the use of the nuns, demolished and, with the help of offerings from the villagers, had another one erected, the foundation stone of which was laid on January 6, 1591.

== 17th century ==
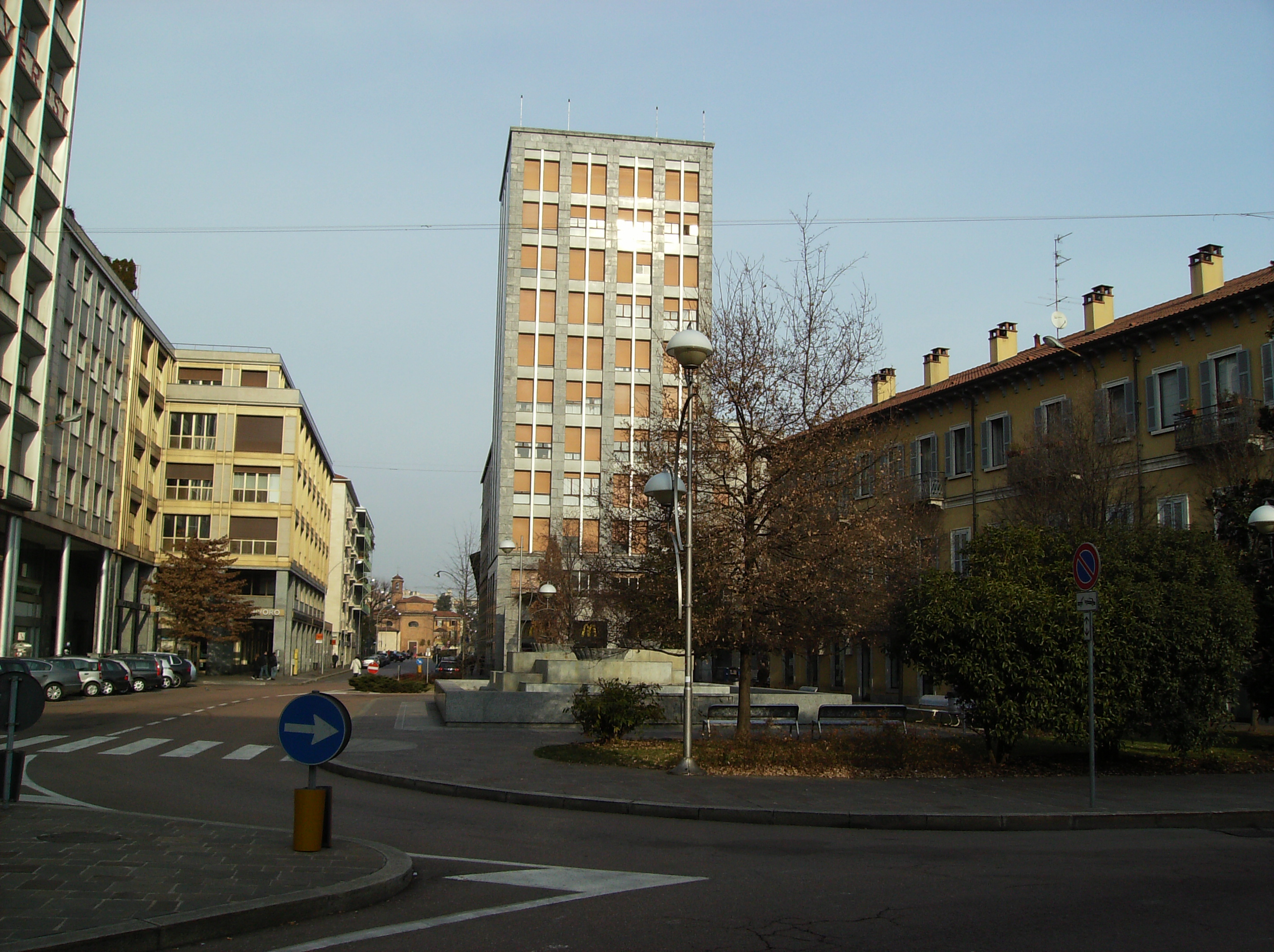
Giuseppe Garibaldi Square, once the "meadow of Porta Basilica"

In seventeenth-century Busto Arsizio, the embankment and moat that surrounded the medieval town were now useless and for this reason had been partially leveled or otherwise abandoned. There remained the four ancient gates, with their bridges over the moat: the Basilica gate to the east (which gave access to the larger and more populated district), the Pessina (or Piscina) gate to the west, the Savico gate to the north and the Sciornago gate also to the west at the height of the Church of S. Rocco.

At the gates, past the moat, large spaces for public use, known as "meadows," opened up. The four contrade converged in the square of Santa Maria, with the porticoes of the weekly market, called platea magna. In 1602 there were 2945 inhabitants living in Busto Arsizio, divided into 585 households.

The abandonment of the moat was also due to the significant reduction in the water flow of the Tenore stream, which was now full of water only during periods of heavy rainfall. The decrease in the Tenore's water flow was caused by climate change. At the end of the 1500s, the so-called "Little Ice Age" began, which saw a decrease in temperature resulting in more ice on the mountains and less water on the plains. The meager flows of the Tenore were thus swallowed up by the permeable pebbly soils of the moors north of the town. In Busto, the almost always dry riverbed of the Tenore became the Via dei sassi (present-day Via Galvani and Via Bellini).

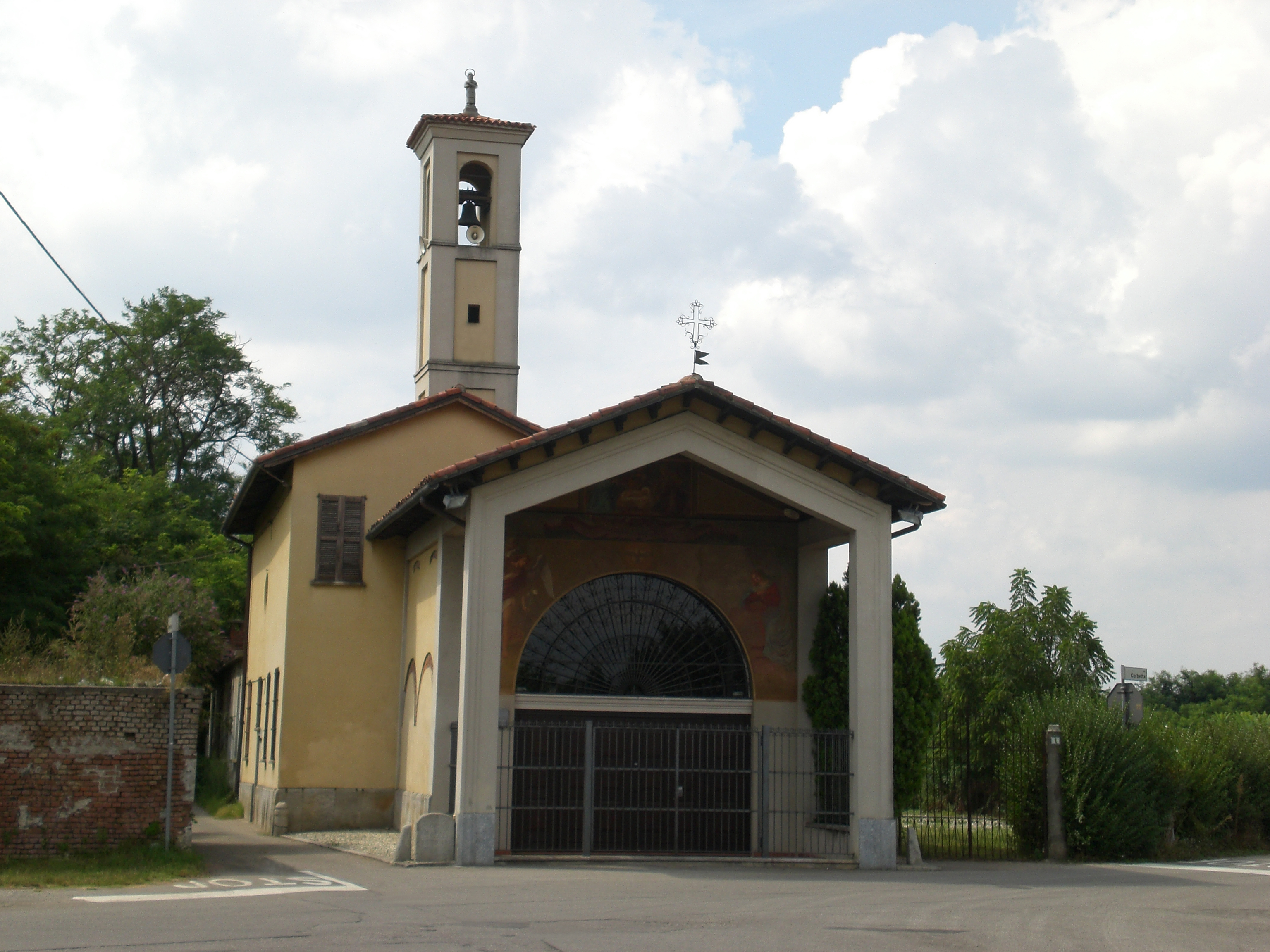
Church of Our Lady in Veroncora

During the seventeenth century, interventions were implemented in almost all existing places of worship in Busto Arsizio: the reconstructions of the churches of St. John the Baptist (1609–1635) and St. Michael the Archangel (1652–1679), the construction of the church of Our Lady in Veroncora (before 1630), the church of St. Gregory in Camposanto (1657–1659), the oratory of the Cascina dei Poveri (1665–1668), the mortuary near San Giovanni (1689–1692), the bell towers of Santa Croce and Santa Maria Maddalena (1603), later both destroyed, the enlargement of Madonna in Prato (c. 1605) and Sant'Antonio (1670), and the restorations in the early church of San Rocco (1603–1614).

Around 1625 the so-called Codex of Busto, an evangeliary dating back to the ninth century and thus constituting the oldest complete document on the Ambrosian liturgy, passed from the rectory of Olgiate Olona to the one in Busto Arsizio and later to the Chapter Library of St. John the Baptist.

As for the administration of the county of Busto Arsizio, in 1613 Count Paolo Camillo abdicated in favor of his eldest son Luigi Marliani. In 1630 Luigi died of the plague in Milan and was succeeded by his grandson Carlo Marliani, only twenty-four years old, who held the office until 1653.

Although no church in Busto Arsizio at the time could boast the title of provostal seat, the town could boast as many as five parish priests. Each constituted the spiritual leader of a hamlet of Busto Arsizio and held a specific prebend. Three of them resided at the church of St. John the Baptist and two others were resident at the church of St. Michael the Archangel.

In the first thirty years of the 17th century, a major hydraulic work was built in the village: the Tenore cover. By 1631, as a result of the reduction in the stream's water flow due to the minor glaciation, the Pool of St. Mary's Square had turned into a foul-smelling pond, and consequently it was decided to bury it.

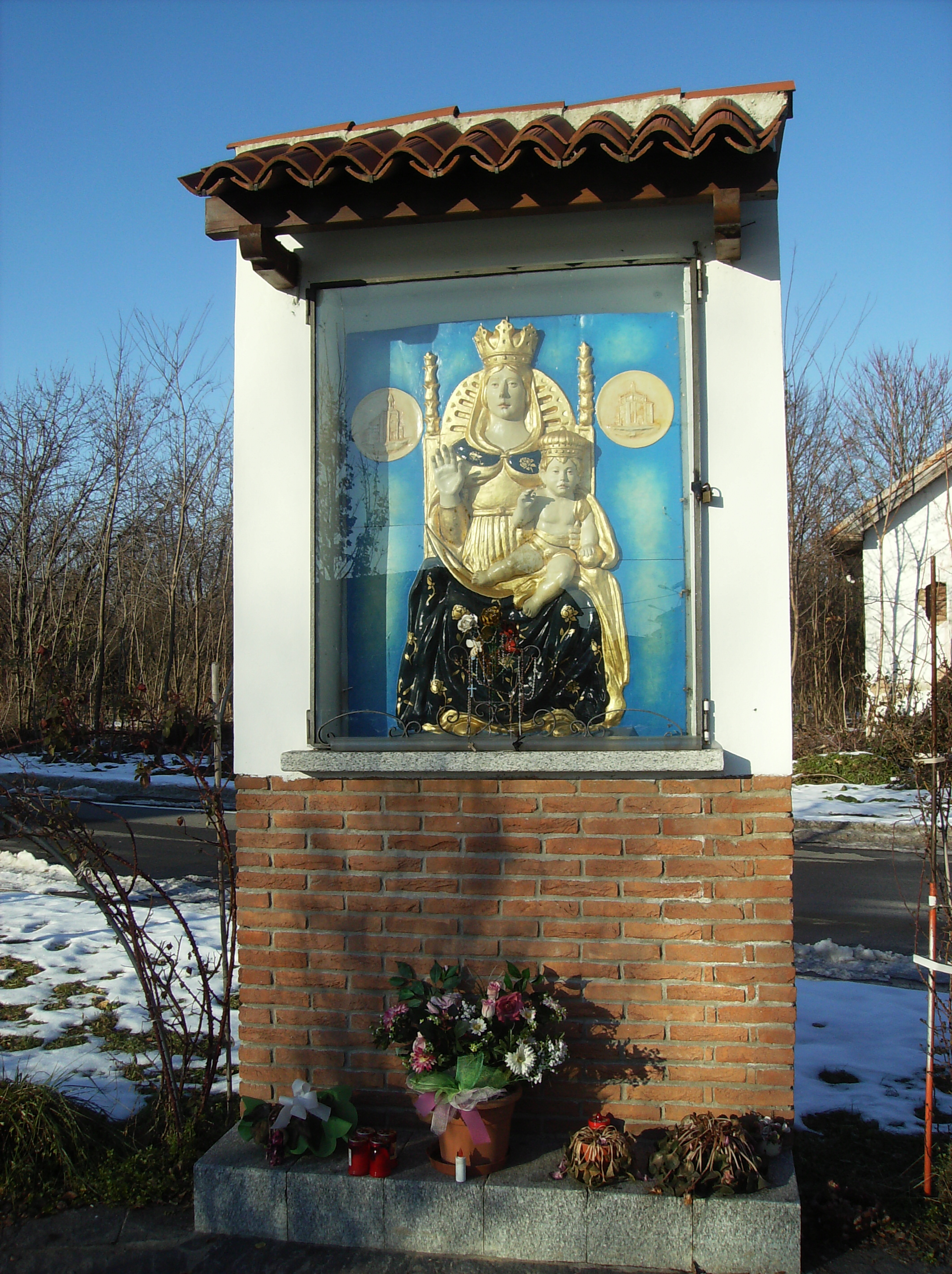
Depiction of Our Lady of Help

=== The plague of 1630 ===
In 1621 a new plague epidemic raged over the territory. In addition, Busto Arsizio suffered severe damage in 1629 due to raids by German and Polish mercenary soldiers. In February of the following year yet another tremendous plague epidemic was unleashed on the village. During that same year 1,000 of the 3,000 inhabitants were killed and another 500 died the following year from the contagion. The event was recounted by Canon Giovanni Battista Lupi in a manuscript now in Copenhagen, and immortalized in two canvases preserved in the Museum of Sacred Art of St. Michael the Archangel. The districts pertaining to San Michele Arcangelo, Pessina and Sciornago, had a lower number of victims.

When the epidemic ceased in 1631, the survivors expressed their joy with solemn processions. On that occasion, the miraculous simulacrum of Our Lady of Santa Maria di Piazza was brought, to whose help is attributed the grace of the cessation of the scourge. The Virgin is called for this reason Our Lady of Help. After that experience, the villagers felt the need to have a permanent, communal health service. This desire was expressed in the wills written in the testaments of the most generous of the villagers, who left their property for this purpose to a lay association called the School of the Poor of Christ. To this day, the symbol of the Busto Arsizio Hospital Company is Our Lady of Help venerated by the citizens of Busto Arsizio.

=== Second half of the 17th century ===
Beginning in 1657 there was a shift from the division of the village into the four contrade to the administrative subdivision into the five comunetti, named after some local families. The Arconati commune was the first to be formed, followed by Mizzaferro in 1664. The following year the Pasquali and Visconti communes were formed (united since 1683 with the new commune of Pozzo, with the name "Pozzo e Visconti"). Lastly, the Dominante commune was created.

The formalistic Spanish rule left the people of Busto in a deep crisis that exhausted the productive structures of the urban centers. It also created intricate institutional confusion and great administrative disorder. The whole economy, with industry and handicrafts in primis, entered a stagnant phase.

== 18th century ==
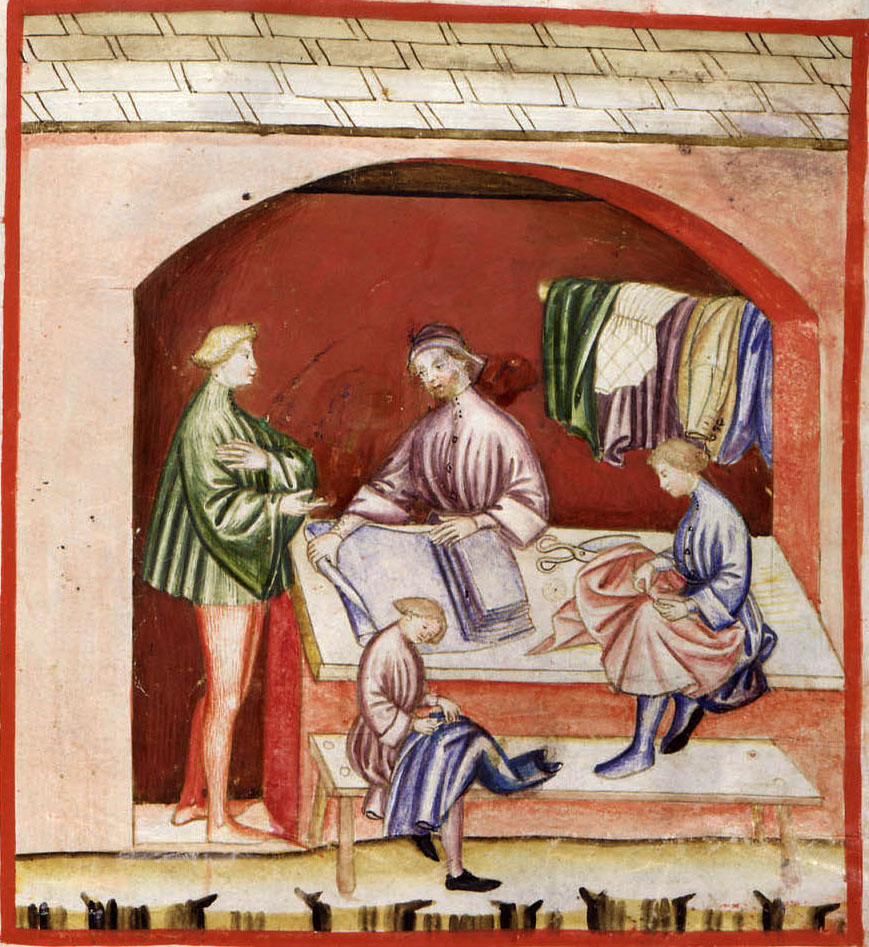
The manufacture of silk, Tacuinum Sanitatis casanatensis (14th century)

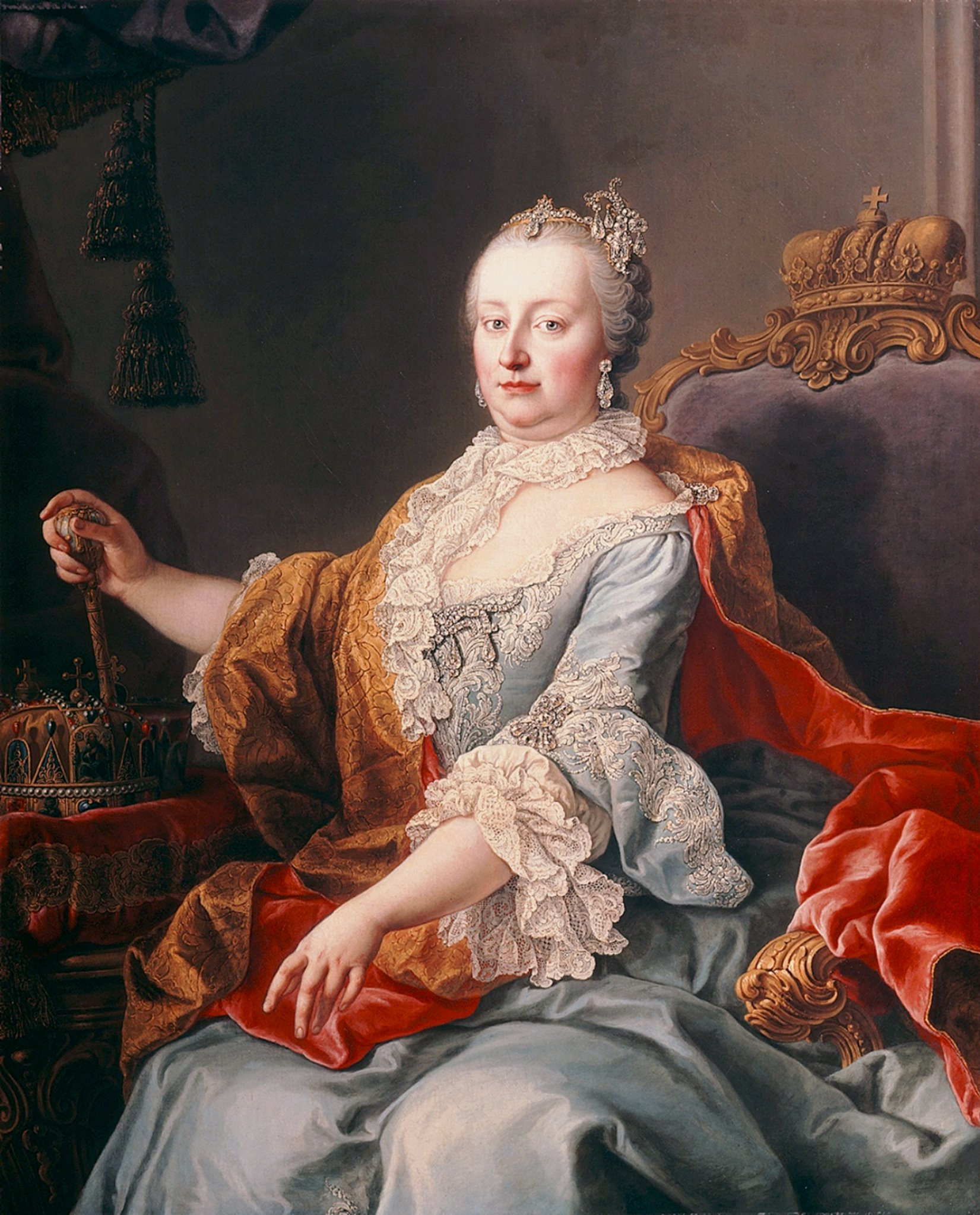
Maria Theresa of Austria

In 1706, during the War of the Spanish Succession, the territory was occupied by the Austrians with their ruler Joseph I. At the beginning of the 18th century, the town had a population of about 6,000 inhabitants. The Austrian period (1714–1796) brought slow and lasting changes to society. The religious fervor renewed in the eighteenth century stimulated a relevant artistic production: Busto Arsizio was enriched with religious buildings such as the Madonna delle Grazie (today Sant'Anna), the Madonna in Prato (which was enlarged and completely decorated with frescoes) and the Mortori in the churches of San Michele Arcangelo and San Giovanni Battista.

By 1720 there is mention of the existence of the Ursuline Hospital, a place of shelter for the sick poor.

In 1722, surveyor Carlo Giuseppe Ronzio, with the assistance of several experts, began and completed the surveys of the village, later collected in the Teresian Cadastre. The clergy amounted to 88, out of a population divided into about 500 families. In addition, out of a total of 27,625 pertiche, nearly 10,000 (calculating personal charges in the head of individual clergymen) were in the name of benefices, canonries, chaplaincies and others.

As late as 1751 Busto Arsizio was still divided into five communes. During Austrian rule, the power of the feudal lords was radically curtailed. On June 23, 1757, Empress Maria Theresa of Austria issued a regulation on the administration of the community of Busto Arsizio which established a council representing the entire municipality. All previous divisions, i.e., the "comunetti" formed during the previous century and named Arconati, Mizzaferro, Pasquali, Pozzo and Visconti, were therefore suppressed, and any future divisions forbidden. In the recomposed village there was a revival of agriculture, the value of which was increased through manufacturing, which, through the processing of agricultural products, created added value. Linked to agriculture was the development of textile industries, especially the manufacture of silk, linen, wool and fibers, some of which were produced locally.

In 1753, Cardinal Giuseppe Pozzobonelli arrived at the Pieve di Busto during a detailed pastoral visit of the entire Ambrosian diocese that had begun in 1744 and was completed in 1764. After meeting with the local clergy and drawing up the registers, he solemnly consecrated the high altars of the two main churches in the village. Meanwhile, the population of the municipality of Busto Arsizio had risen to 5487 (1770).

In 1778 the family of Count Marliani became extinct, and in 1779 the fief of Busto Arsizio passed to Count Giuseppe Gambarana, eldest son of the last Marliani and Gerolamo. The Gambarana family was well regarded at the court of Vienna. On September 26, 1786, the municipality was included in the province of Gallarate, with the other localities of the Milanese parishes, following the subdivision of the Lombard territory into eight provinces. From the end of 1787 the seat of the political intendancy was moved from Gallarate to Varese. By 1791 the municipalities of the parish of Gallarate were included in district XXXIII of the province of Milan.

During the reign of Joseph II, son of Maria Theresa, there was resistance from the population of Busto Arsizio to radical reforms, especially in the face of laws that suppressed religious congregations with devotional and contemplative purposes.

This opposition between society and the government became more pronounced with the passage of time and even reached the characteristics of outright revolt, during the period of French rule. On January 29, 1797, a part of the population of Busto Arsizio rebelled against Napoleon's army to free some Austrian prisoners, and later in the year there were anti-French demonstrations, in a pro-Austrian vein; new riots also broke out in 1798, in the wake of those that occurred in Luino.

The following year, on April 28, 1799, to the cries of the cheering crowd "Long live religion! Long live Francis II who gives it back to us!", the Austrians returned to Milan triumphantly. The following year, however, Napoleon regained possession of the city's territories.

In 1796, the counts of Busto Arsizio were deprived of their fief following the edict of 22 prairial year IV (June 10, 1796) in which feudal authorities were abolished in the territories occupied by the French. In 1799 Busto Arsizio passed to the Cicogna counts, who maintained dominion over the town until 1822.

== 19th century ==
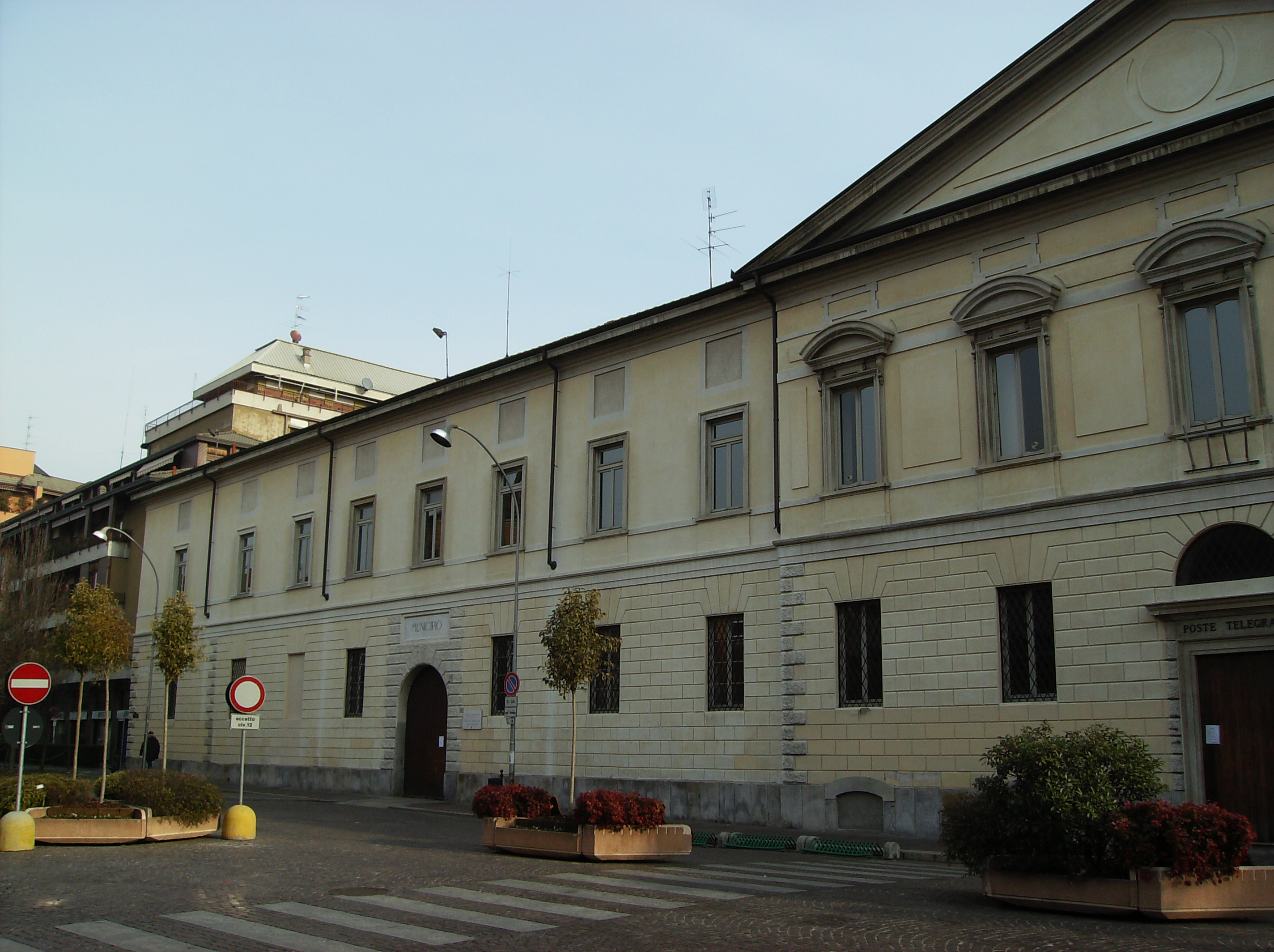
Gilardoni Palace

The French period (1796–1814) brought rapid and violent transformations to society, but they did not always last. Local industry, which had seen promising development under Austrian rule, was severely hampered by Napoleon Bonaparte's economic policy, which prohibited the import of materials and hindered the export of textiles to favor French trade.

In 1806 the continental blockade prevented English ships from entering the peninsula's ports and removed the possibility of importing cotton.

Administratively, in 1801 Busto Arsizio became part of the Fourth District of the Department of Olona. The capital of the department was Milan, while the district capital was Gallarate. Beginning in 1805, Busto was included in the new territorial compartment of Canton I of Gallarate, in the aforementioned district.

On December 7, 1813, on news of the possible arrival of German troops, new anti-French riots broke out, probably organized by gangs outside the city; French repression led to the arrest of 9 local men.

On April 20, 1814, taking advantage of the chaos resulting from the killing of Minister Prina, carter Andrea Crespi Bosinetti led the revolt of a group of citizens, proclaiming himself King of Busto Arsizio (King "Bilì") with the support of the plebs. Some stores and stately homes were stormed and conscription lists were set on fire in Piazza Santa Maria, along with other tax documents. After three days, an Austrian intervention easily restored order, supported by some local notables, including Giovanni Azimonti Gallora, Carlo Cesare Bossi and Paolo Tosi.

In 1814 the Kingdom of Italy finally collapsed, partly as a result of Napoleon's defeat at Leipzig in 1813; in 1815 Busto Arsizio, along with the rest of Lombardy and Veneto, was annexed to Habsburg territory. The two territories were united into the Kingdom of Lombardy-Venetia. In 1816 the territory subject to the government of Milan was divided into nine provinces. The province of Milan was divided into sixteen districts, and Busto Arsizio was named capital of the fifteenth district, which also included Legnano.

The hospital project reached a beginning of implementation in 1825 by Canon Giuseppe Candiani. The Congregation of Charity (formerly the School of the Poor) commissioned architect Pietro Gilardoni to draw up the plan, and construction was subsequently begun. The inauguration of the new hospital at Palazzo Gilardoni took place 28 years later in 1853. The hospital functioned for more than half a century until it proved inadequate at the end of the century.

In the period between 1830 and 1850 the population rose from 8,300 to 11,139. This increase was made possible by a noticeable and constant immigration, presumably from nearby areas, of families seeking work. During this 20-year period, public petroleum lighting was introduced (1842).

It turns out that in 1854 almost half of Lombard textile production was concentrated in the Busto Arsizio area (150,000 pieces out of 338,000) despite the fact that this area had less than one-third of Lombard looms (5,000 out of 16,900). These figures highlight the markedly more favorable yield for looms in the Busto Arsizio area.

In 1855 the construction of the city jails was completed.

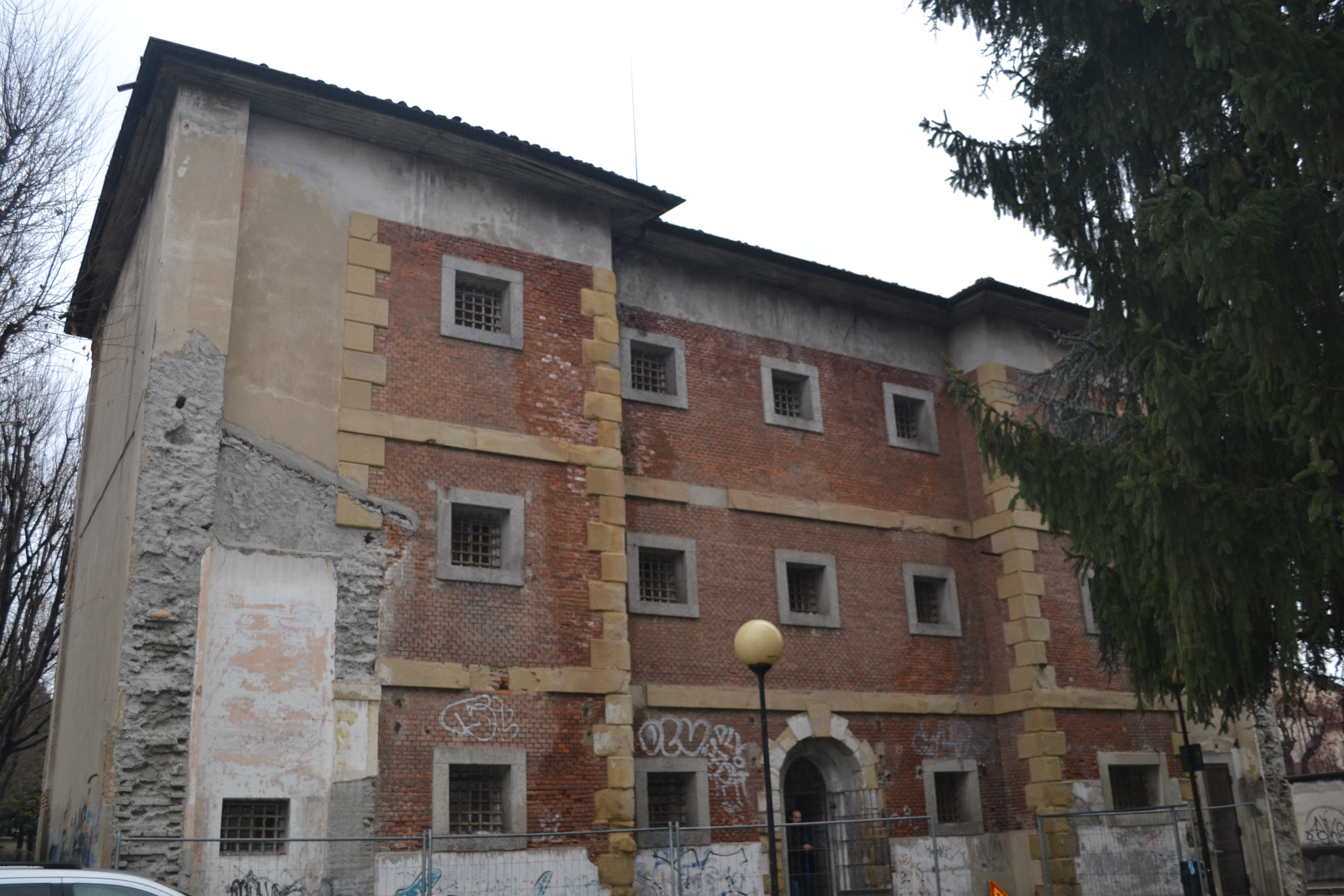
Exterior of the Austrian prisons in Busto Arsizio (2016)

In the second half of the nineteenth century the development of the town outside the defensive walls began, along the strà Balon (present-day Corso XX Settembre) and the Garottola street (present-day Via Mameli). The population continued to grow and reached 15,720 in 1861, the year of the proclamation of the Kingdom of Italy. In that year a series of transformations began that erased the still seventeenth-century appearance of the town and laid the foundation for the current one. From December of the previous year, the railway connection with Milan was also activated: the town's first station came into operation and the Sant'Anna kindergarten was founded.

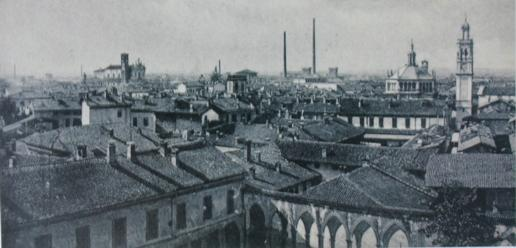
Panorama of Busto Arsizio: on the left is the church of St. Michael the Archangel when it was not yet overlooked by a skyscraper, in the center can be seen the two towers of the Cotonificio Bustese, while on the right is visible the Sanctuary of St. Mary

From the mid-19th century modern industry began to play an increasingly important role, so much so that in a few decades Busto Arsizio became the so-called "Manchester of Italy" (in 1862 it already had 51 firms, mostly spinning or weaving mills). When the first industry found in the waters of the Olona River a fundamental means for its development, the town, whose fame in the textile field dated back to the Middle Ages, laid the foundations for transforming itself into a city at the forefront of industry, due to the dedication to work rooted in its inhabitants. Among others, the following were established: the Ercole Bossi Cotton Mill(1875), the Giovanni Milani & Nipoti Cotton Mill (1880), the Ercole Comerio Mechanics (1885), the Cotonificio Bustese (1887), the Giuseppe Borri Footwear Factory (1892), the Airoldi & Pozzi Weaving Mill (1896), the Lissoni & Castiglioni Weaving Mill, and the Enrico Candiani Cotton Mill.

Under the administration of Pasquale Pozzi, the historic city gates were demolished.

On October 30, 1864, Busto Arsizio was granted the title of city in the Kingdom of Italy, and, according to the Municipal Order Law of 1865, the municipality had to be administered by a mayor, a junta and a council. From that year on, the Civil and Criminal Court of Busto Arsizio was also established (which acquired for a period the competences of the Court of Varese). Alongside the city's growth in prestige, there was an increase in population, which allowed the project to be proposed to divide Busto Arsizio into two parishes again. The request was sent to the Prefecture of Milan in 1869, which turned it over to the Archiepiscopal Curia.

The city's expansion had big effects on the economy as well. In 1873, fifteen years after the opening of the Busto branch of the Savings Bank, the Bank of Busto Arsizio was founded. Seven years later, in 1880, the Gate of the Three Kings was torn down (the Milan Gate had been demolished in the 1960s). In 1882, work begun two years earlier on the Ferrovie Nord railway line was completed and the second Busto Arsizio station came into operation.

On September 15, 1880, the Milan-Gallarate interurban tramway line with steam traction was inaugurated. The tramway, coming from what was then Porta Tenaglia in Milan (today Porta Volta), entered Busto Arsizio through Stra' Balon, today's Via XX Settembre. Beginning in the middle of the street, as it entered the built-up area, it reduced its speed (the maximum allowed by the Province of Milan was 15 km/h) and was accompanied, at a walking pace, by the bugler. Once he reached Piazza Garibaldi, he would skirt what was formerly the perimeter of the old village through Piazza Trento e Trieste, Via Mazzini and Piazza Manzoni. Once it arrived at the church of Madonna in Prato, the bugler would leave the tramway, which would resume its run with destination to Gallarate through Via Quintino Sella and Viale della Repubblica. The line was permanently closed on January 18, 1966, even though the section between Legnano and Gallarate had not operated since 1951.

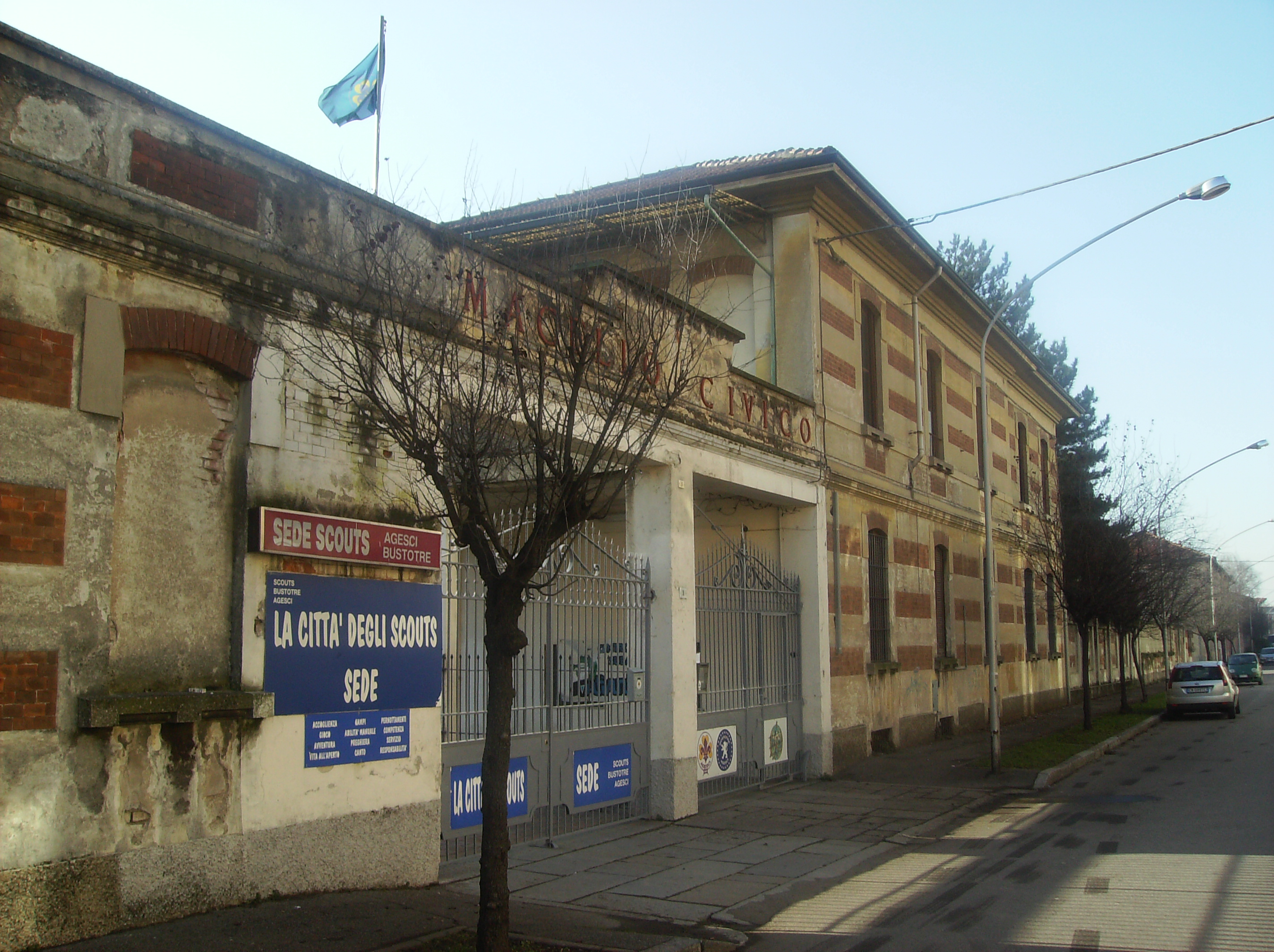
Civic Slaughterhouse designed by Camillo Crespi Balbi

The last 15 years of the 19th century saw the beginning of the activity of Enrico dell'Acqua, an Italian pioneer of cotton exporting to the world, and in particular to Africa, Asia Minor and South America, where the presence of compact and affluent masses of Italians could guarantee the success of the enterprise, which ended in the first decade of the following century. Busto Arsizio thus acquired the dual nature of a cotton and mechanical town, a situation that ensured its fortune and prosperity for a long time.

In January 1883, the "Sons of Labor League," among the city's first workers' organizations, was founded and fostered the development of the labor movement; linked to the Workers' Party, it was dissolved in 1886.

At the turn of the century, the Teatro Sociale, designed by architect Achille Sfondrini (1836-1900, already the author in 1872 of the Carcano in Milan and in 1880 of the Costanzi in Rome), came into operation in 1891. The first performance was Giuseppe Verdi and F.M. Fiori's La forza del destino (Sept. 27). Two years later, in 1893, the new Monumental Cemetery was opened, replacing the one in the meadow of San Gregorio, just outside the perimeter of the ancient village. From 1894 was the first design of the Civic Slaughterhouse, by Camillo Crespi Balbi.

In 1895 the Circolo Socialista was born, the first nucleus of the Busto section of the Socialist Party; it was dissolved in 1898 after the events in Milan.

In 1897 the public aqueduct was inaugurated, consisting of a huge reservoir well hoisted on a 25-meter-high tower, which still overlooks Via Monte Rosa. The reservoir operated until 1978. The engineer Eugenio Villoresi, who also designed the famous canal, designed the tower. Operating the aqueduct was the Società Condotta d'Acqua di Busto Arsizio, founded in 1896.

== 20th and 21st centuries ==
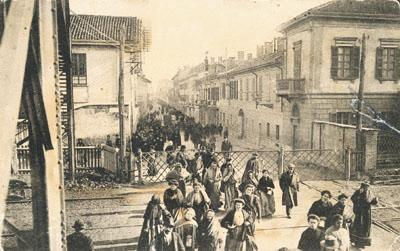
Exit of the workers at the intersection of XX September Street and the Mediterranean railway (now Avenue of Glory)

The early twentieth century was a period of great turmoil and transformation for the city. Technological innovations and new means of transportation prompted many entrepreneurs to reorganize or expand their factories. The significant population increase (Busto Arsizio in 1901 had more than 24,000 inhabitants and had grown roughly 40 percent in just twenty years) made the city's urban planning precarious, and for this reason several projects for a Master Plan were drafted. In addition, new industries were added to those founded in the previous century: the Venzaghi Cotton Mill (1906), the Molini Marzoli Massari (1906), the Luigi Grampa e Figli Mechanics (1913), and the Benigno Crespi Cotton Mill (1914). The residences of Busto entrepreneurs, symbols of the city's economic power, were built in the vicinity of industrial warehouses, giving rise to blocks with a mixture of manufacturing and residential use.

The weight of the working-class component also grew, which favored the election of the first radical mayor in 1905 (Giuseppe Rossi) and, later, the first socialist mayor in 1914 (Carlo Azimonti).

During these years of city expansion and population growth, hopes were rekindled to divide the territory into two parishes again. Initially, there was a desire to proceed with a subdivision through the north-south route that passes through Piazza Santa Maria, obtaining two areas almost homogeneous in size and number of inhabitants. In July 1901, Cardinal Andrea Carlo Ferrari arrived in Busto Arsizio on a pastoral visit that had not taken place in the parish since 1753, but he did not comment on the issue. Finally, in 1906, three years after the inauguration of the first district school that had been built right near the church, the second benefice of St. Michael was erected as a parish.

The history of the first Busto colonies also has its roots in the early twentieth century, or even in the last years of the nineteenth century. At first the colonies of Loano and Varallo Sesia were established. Later those in Ceresole and San Fedele d'Intelvi were opened.

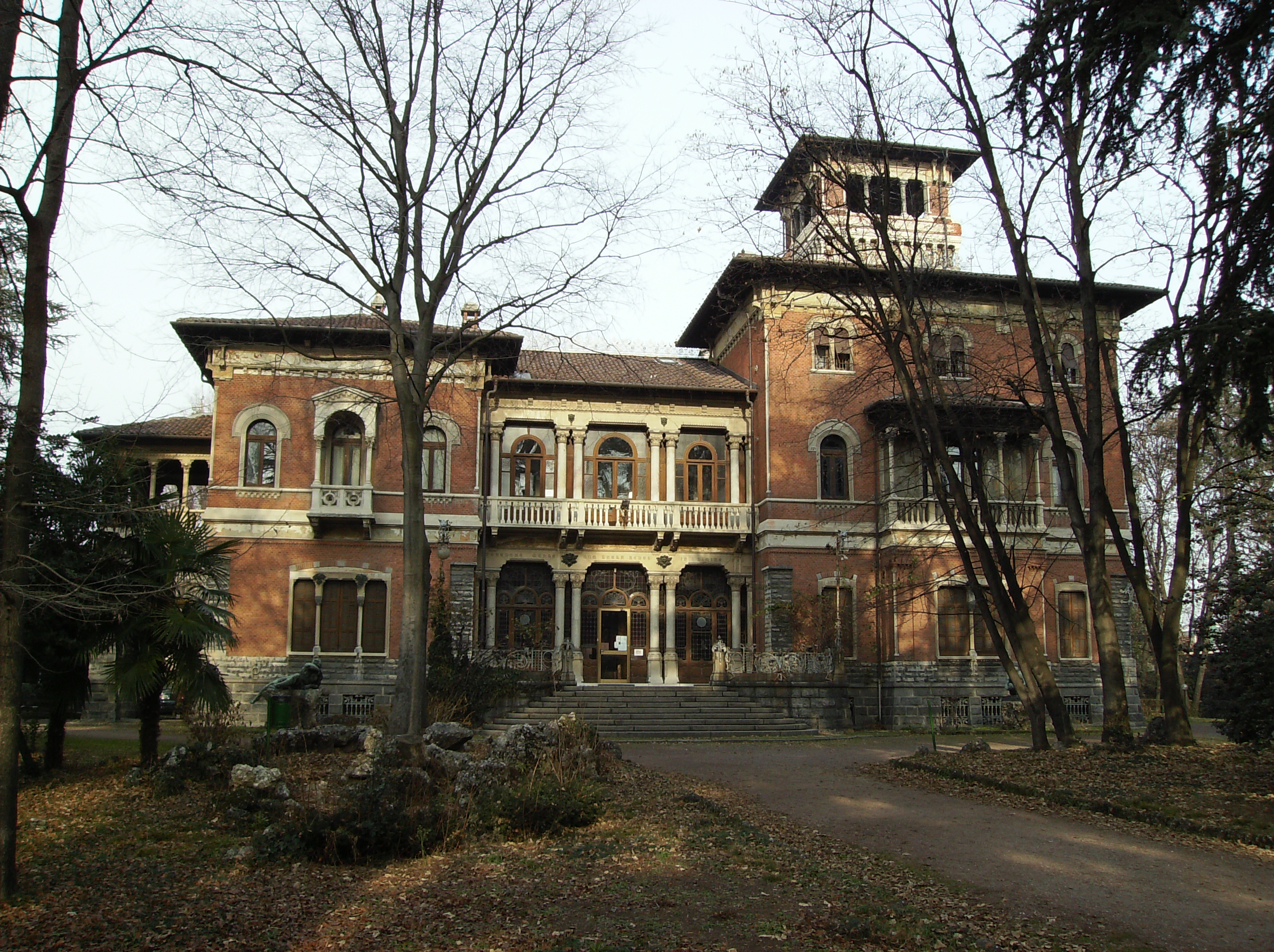
Ottolini-Tosi Villa

As far as Busto architecture is concerned, the first Art Nouveau villas began to appear in the early years of the new century, the main features of which are the break with the rigid symmetry of the past and the use of geometric or floral ornamentation as an expression of compositional freedom. The first Busto glimpses of the new style are encountered in Alessandro Mazzucotelli's wrought irons in the Ottolini-Tosi (1902) and Ottolini-Tovaglieri (1903) villas. Later, Silvio Gambini designed several Art Nouveau buildings, such as the Molini Marzoli Massari (1906) and the sumptuous Villa Leone (1910).

In 1915, the year Italy entered the war, the Società Anonima Ferrovie Meridionali Sarde was founded in Busto Arsizio with the aim of building a narrow-gauge (950 millimeter) railroad in southwestern Sardinia, according to a project approved by the government and dating from 1911. On May 1 of the same year, the new hospital was inaugurated.

The early postwar period coincided with a difficult time for industry. The railroad, from an incentive factor, became an obstacle to the city's expansion. For this reason it was moved in 1924 to its present site, east of the town center. In place of the old track, which almost bordered the boundary of the old town from which only the old City Hospital divided it, emerged the avenues A. Diaz, Duca d'Aosta, L. Cadorna and G. Borri. The industrial census of 1927 highlighted the return to a favorable situation for industry. Other important factories were established in the 1920s and 1930s, such as Mario Crosta Mechanics (1925) or Fonderia Tovaglieri (1938).

Moreover, after the conflict, the fascist movement also grew in Busto, and in August 1922 the municipality was occupied by the Blackshirts, who ousted the socialist administration. In the 1923 elections, also abetted by the abstention of the oppositions, the clear victory of the National Blocs led to the election of Ottorino Maderna, who would later become the first podestà.

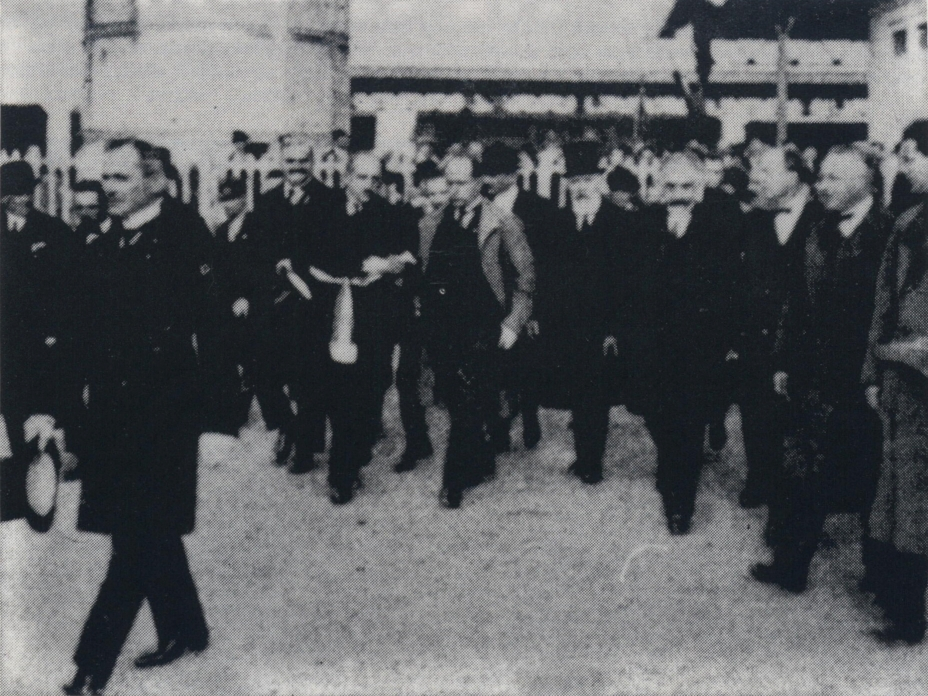
Benito Mussolini inaugurates the new railway station (October 25, 1924)

In 1922 the town hall was moved from the now unsuitable Palazzo Cicogna to Palazzo Gilardoni, a former hospital, which had been purchased by the municipality in 1914. In 1927 the Carlo Speroni Stadium, in which Pro Patria still plays today, was inaugurated. In that same year, Busto Arsizio passed from the Province of Milan to the Province of Varese; the city, despite being the largest in the new province, was not chosen as the capital. According to a town legend, one factor contributing to the decision was the behavior of the Busto Arsizio residents during a visit by Benito Mussolini to the city, on which occasion the Duce was ignored by the majority of the citizens. On April 6 of the same year, general elections took place, which were held under the control of the Fascists. Despite the incitement to duty, only 73 percent of eligible voters voted, and the success of the right-wing list was less extensive than expected and well below the national percentage of 64 percent. From April 21 (and until 1945) the democratic organs of Busto Arsizio, like those of all Italian municipalities, were suppressed and all functions previously performed by the mayor, the council and the city council were transferred to a podestà, appointed by Royal Decree.

In 1928 the municipalities of Borsano and Sacconago were aggregated to Busto Arsizio, which at the 1931 census had 2,413 and 4,435 inhabitants, respectively, out of the city's total of 39,841, confirming it as the most populous city in the province.

Also in 1928, the Milk Plant was built, one of the public works constructed outside the historic center at that time. The others are the Colonia elioterapica (of 1929), the Pontida schools (of 1933), the covered market (of 1935) and the municipal swimming pool (of 1938).

During the 20-year period, two priests were among the promoters of the city's development: don Paolo Cairoli of the Santi Apostoli neighbourhood (still popularly referred to as the "don Paolo" neighbourhood) and don Ambrogio Gianotti of the neighbourhood of Sant'Edoardo.

Busto Arsizio took an active part in the armed resistance struggle in the mountains and in the clandestine support work that took place in the city. Workers organized several strikes as early as the spring of 1943. A number of partisan brigades were formed: the Raimondi, the 102nd Garibaldi Brigade and the Lupi, which acted in Sacconago. The city's priests also participated silently in the Resistance.

Although Busto Arsizio, unlike the neighboring areas and Milan, was spared from bombing from the fall of 1944 because it was the headquarters of the so-called Chrysler mission that maintained contact between partisans and the Allies, the city suffered three fighter-bomber raids that occurred in the summer of 1944. The final insurrection order left on the morning of April 25, 1945, from the Church of St. Edward, Busto Arsizio, thanks to the parish priest Don Ambrogio Gianotti, in which a partisan nucleus had been established. In the evening, after the fascists and the Germans had accepted the surrender, Radio Busto Libera was the first radio station in northern Italy to announce the liberation from the Nazi-fascists throughout northern Italy. Busto Arsizio is among the decorated cities and was awarded the Bronze Medal of Military Valor for merits acquired during the partisan struggle during World War II.

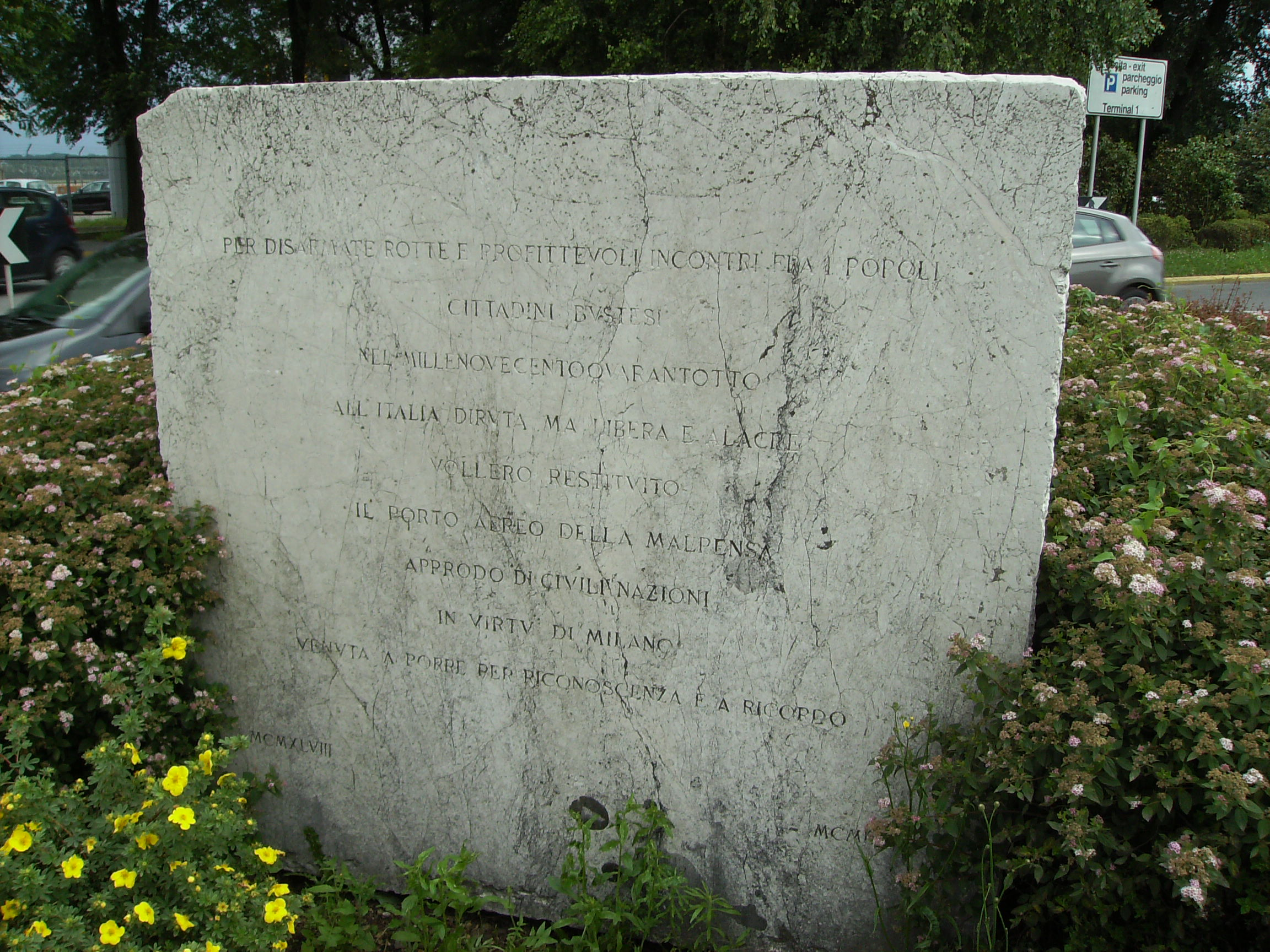
Memorial stone to the citizens of Busto Arsizio located at Malpensa Airport (formerly City of Busto Arsizio Airport)

Meanwhile, little by little, all the new parishes were created and added to the four historic ones. The first was St. Apostles in Genoa Street (1930). Then the Church of St. Edward, Busto Arsizio (1939), St. Louis in the Beata Giuliana ward (1958), St. Anne's in the village of the same name (1961) and St. Mary Regina (1964) were created. Redeemer Parish was established in 1973, followed ten years later by Sacred Heart Parish (1983), known as Friars' Parish. The last two parishes created were St. Joseph's (1990) and St. Cross of Brughetto (1991).

After World War II, development resumed and numerous initiatives were financially supported by the people of Busto and Brughetto. One of the most important was the construction of the Malpensa Intercontinental Airport, formerly Aeroporto Città di Busto Arsizio. On May 22, 1948, SEA was founded in the city under the name Busto Arsizio Airport Company. Giovanni Rossini, an entrepreneur and mayor of Busto Arsizio, was elected chairman of the board of directors. In a few months the buildings and facilities were upgraded, and on November 21 of that same year, in the presence of Cardinal Ildefonso Schuster, ministers and undersecretaries, the new Malpensa airport began operations with the landing of a four-engine plane.

A second important initiative was promoted in 1951 by banker Benigno Airoldi, industrialists Antonio Tognella, Carlo Schapira, and Enrico Candiani, mayor Giovanni Rossini, and parliamentarians Facchinetti, Morelli, and Tosi, who created the International Textile Exhibition, which was demolished in 2009. The design of the building was entrusted to Enrico Castiglioni, Luigi Crespi, Carlo Fontana, and Eugenio Prandina. The area chosen is on the territory of Castellanza, but the project was developed by a consortium in which Busto Arsizio had a dominant part.

One of the crime stories that had the greatest impact in those years was the death of Brigadier Francesco Nannetti, who, called to intervene at the scene of a multiple murder in the central Via Cavour, demonstrating a disregard for danger, confronted the murderer, was shot in various parts of his body and died that same day.

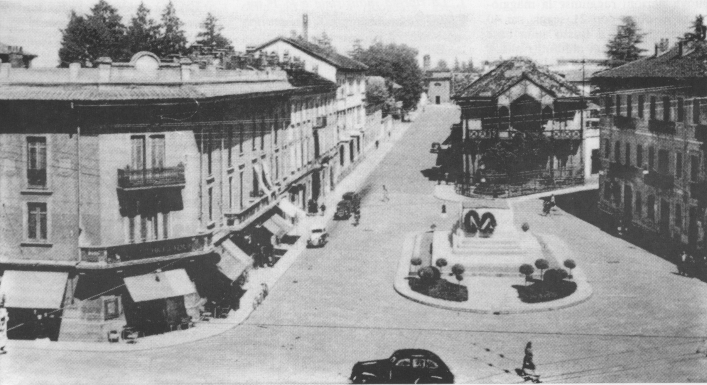
Garibaldi Square in the early 1950s

Those years saw a new period of population growth. The number of inhabitants, which numbered 49 200 in 1949, rose to 55 930 in 1955 and 78 601 in 1971, partly due to strong immigration, which was very pronounced especially in the years between 1960 and 1964, when the migratory balance exceeded 1 500 inhabitants each year. Precisely in anticipation of this population growth, the Municipal Administration decided to build the "Sant'Anna Village," which was built between 1958 and 1960 by a group of architects coordinated by Enrico Castiglioni. At the same time, in the 1950s and 1960s, the "Giuliani e Dalmati" neighborhood was built near Borsano, so named because it was intended for the city's reception of the many Italians exiled from the lands of Istria, Venezia Giulia and Dalmatia after World War II.

In 1970, the municipalities of Busto Arsizio, Gallarate, Legnano, Nerviano and Samarate founded ACCAM (Associazione Consortile dei Comuni dell'Alto Milanese) to design, organize and manufacture waste disposal plants. The company is based in Busto Arsizio. The plant's two lines, opened on August 21, 2000, dispose of one hundred and ten thousand tons of waste per year (400 tons per day).

In 1984 the old and now dilapidated prison (located in the center of town) was closed and replaced by a new, more modern facility.

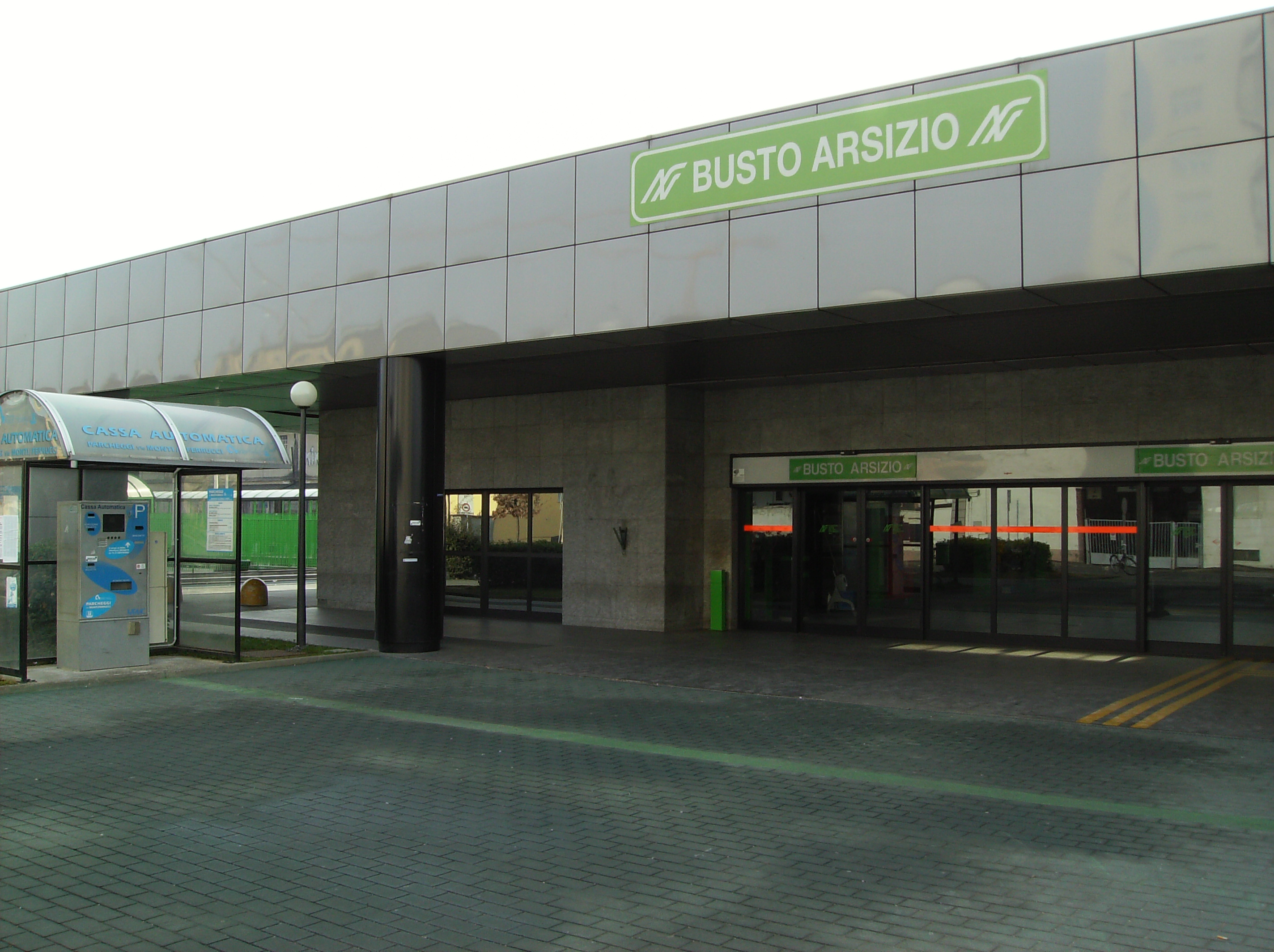
Busto Arsizio Nord railway station

During the 1980s, another priest figure was intrinsically linked to the city of Busto Arsizio and its people: the one of "a martyr of charity and love," Don Isidoro. A former teacher at the Liceo Classico Daniele Crespi and director of the Altomilanese edition of the weekly newspaper "Luce," he was among the founders of the "Marco Riva" association in Busto Arsizio, which began as a listening center and became, in 1987, a community for drug addicts. In 1990 he was appointed coadjutor of the newly formed parish of St. Joseph, and would have succeeded parish priest Fr. Giuseppe Ravazzani if his short yet very intense earthly life had not been cut short prematurely. On February 14, 1991, he was stabbed and killed by Maurizio Debiaggi, a young drug addict with serious mental problems who was being treated at the "Marco Riva" center. At his funeral, the then cardinal of the Milan diocese Carlo Maria Martini remembered him by comparing him to a saint. Every year, on Valentine's Day, a concert is held in his memory in the city.

In the late 1980s, the city administration decided to bury the Ferrovie Nord Milano line that cut the city in two and contributed to the expenses with an outlay of 22 billion lire (about 15 million euros), out of a total cost of about 80 billion (about 40 million euros). The old station, located at the end of Ugo Foscolo Street, was razed to make way for parking lots and a new one was built. The two level crossings at Via Magenta and Via Milazzo, on the two main arteries connecting the center of Busto Arsizio with the neighborhoods of Sant'Edoardo, Sacconago and Borsano, were abolished. In June 1996 rail service resumed on the route between Milan and Novara. With the burying of the line, the junction between the FS station in Busto and the FNME station in Busto (called junction X) became unusable. Work on its restoration was completed in 2009.

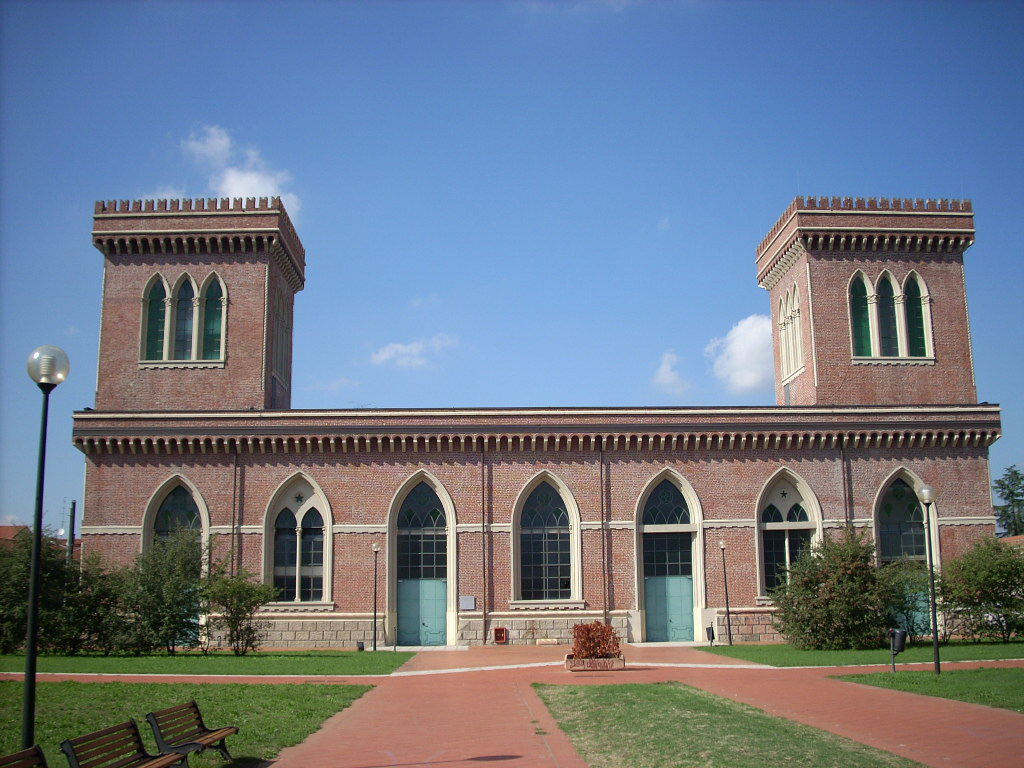
Museum of Textiles and Industry of Busto Arsizio

In 1992, the Hupac Terminal in Busto Arsizio was built for intermodal rail-road transport. In that year, the Swiss company Hupac introduced the first shuttle trains between that terminal and the one in Cologne, Germany. The Busto Arsizio terminal, expanded in 2005, is one of the largest European terminals of its kind and the largest transshipment yard for combined traffic on the north-south European route through Switzerland.

In 1997, upon completion of the renovation of the front parallelepiped of the former Bustese Spinning Mill building, the Museum of Textiles and Industry of Busto Arsizio was set up in which old looms and other machinery were collected.

The new Busto Arsizio-Castellanza railway station is nearing completion, located at the overlay of the State Railways tracks over those of the Northern Railways. Also under construction is a connecting siding between the Busto Arsizio RFI station and the new Busto Arsizio-Castellanza FNME station, known as the Z siding. The Y siding, which will connect Busto Arsizio Nord station with RFI's Legnano station, is also planned.

Busto's industry has become very diversified, partly because of the crisis in the textile sector. The city has been able to cope with the decline of textiles in two ways: by boosting other fields in the secondary sector (mechanical engineering, plastics processing, and construction) and by steadily developing the commercial and tertiary sector.

In 2026 the Olympic flame of the 2026 Winter Olympics passed through the streets of Busto Arsizio.

== See also ==
- Busto Arsizio
- Alto Milanese

== Bibliography ==
- Giovanni Battista Rampoldi (1832). Corografia dell'Italia. Fontana.
- Francesco Bombognini (1856). Antiquario della diocesi di Milano. Pirotta.
- Luigi Ferrario (1864). Busto Arsizio - Notizie storico statistiche . Busto Arsizio: Tipografia sociale.
- Lodovico Antonio Muratori (1868). Annali d'Italia: dal principio dell'era volgare sino all'anno MDCCXLIX, Volume 4. Giachetti.
- Leopoldo Candiani (1923). Il nuovo Ospedale di Busto Arsizio. Cenni storici sulla città ed assistenza ospedaliera. Busto Arsizio.
- Pio Bondioli (1927). Studi e ricerche intorno alla Beata Giuliana da Busto Arsizio. Busto Arsizio: Editrice Milani.
- Pio Bondioli (1937–1954). Storia di Busto Arsizio (2 voll.). Lativa.
- Pio Bondioli (1953). Benedetto Milani. Milano: Tipografia di Luigi Reali.
- Riccardo Riccardi (1953). Origini e sviluppi dell'industria cotoniera bustese. Busto Arsizio: Unione degli Industriali.
- Augusto Marinoni (1957). I dialetti da Saronno al Ticino. Busto Arsizio-Legnano. Rotary Club.
- Santino Langè. Pier Fausto Bagatti Valsecchi (ed.). Ville delle province di Como, Sondrio e Varese. Vol. 2. Milano: Edizioni SISAR.
- Franco Bertolli (1971–1972). "Analisi e paternità della "Storia della peste... 1630", manoscritto bustese ora a Copenaghen". AFB: 35–77.
- Magni-Pacciarotti (1977). Busto Arsizio - Ambiente storia società. Busto Arsizio: Freeman editrice.
- AA.VV. (1981). Sommario di vita bustese dalle origini ai tempi nostri. Azzate: L.V.G. editrice.
- Rogora-Ferrario-Belotti (1981). Sommario di vita bustese dalle origini ai tempi nostri. Azzate: L.V.G. editrice.
- Giampiero Magugliani (1985). Busto Arsizio. Storia di una città attraverso le sue vie e le sue piazze. Busto Arsizio: Pianezza s.r.l.
- Ferrario (1987). Notizie storico statistiche (ristampa anastatica, Busto Arsizio, 1864). Busto Arsizio: Atesa.
- AA.VV. (1989). Sant'Edoardo, la chiesa, la comunità, il quartiere.
- Amici del Liceo (1989). Vita bustese. Rassegna di vita bustese, documenti ed immagini 1920–1940. Busto Arsizio: Bramante editrice.
- Bertolli-Colombo (1990). La peste del 1630 a Busto Arsizio. Busto Arsizio: Bramante editrice.
- Giovan Battista Pellegrini (1990). Toponomastica italiana: 10000 nomi di città, paesi, frazioni, regioni, contrade, fiumi, monti spiegati nella loro origine e storia. Hoepli.
- Bertolli-Pacciarotti-Spada (1991). Chiese minori a Busto Arsizio: San Gregorio e Beata Vergine delle Grazie (Sant'Anna). Busto Arsizio: Libreria della Basilica.
- Amici del Liceo (1991). Del teatro - 150 anni di vita teatrale di Busto Arsizio. Busto Arsizio: Bramante editrice.
- Agnoletto, Attilio (1992). "La battaglia di Legnano è avvenuta nel territorio sangiorgese ? (capitolo scritto da Augusto Marinoni)". San Giorgio su Legnano – storia, società, ambiente. Edizioni Landoni.
- Ferrario Mezzadri-Langè-Spiriti (1992). Il Palazzo Marliani Cicogna in Busto Arsizio. Busto Arsizio: Arti Grafiche Baratelli.
- Maurizio Sbicego (1996). Busto città amata - testi storici di Franco Bertolli e Augusto Spada. Azzate (Varese): Macchione Editore.
- Garavaglia (1997). Museo del Tessile e della Tradizione Industriale di Busto Arsizio. Busto Arsizio: Freeman editrice.
- Spada, Augusto (1997). Busto Arsizio. Architetture Pubbliche. Busto Arsizio: Città di Busto Arsizio.
- Daniela Maffioli (1998). La Capitolare di Busto Arsizio attraverso la storia e alcuni suoi codici (XII-XV secolo). Olgiate Olona: Mariani Artigrafiche s.r.l.
- Gianni Spartà (1999). Per Acqua Ricevuta. Sorgenti, pozzi, fontane. L'affascinante storia di una conquista civile. Macchione.
- AA.VV. (2001). La Basilica di San Giovanni Battista a Busto nell'opera di Francesco Maria Ricchino. Busto Arsizio: Freeman editrice.
- Giuseppe Tettamanti (2001). Zibaldone Cronaca Altri Scritti. Busto Arsizio: Edizioni de "la Provvidenza".
- Luigi Giavini (2002). Le origini di Busto Arsizio dai Liguri ai Longobardi. Nomos edizioni.
- Elisabetta Palmisano (2002). Il Settecento a Busto Arsizio. Busto Arsizio: Freeman editrice.
- Gian Franco Ferrario (2002). Busto Arsizio. Emozioni Liberty. Busto Arsizio: Macchione editore.
- AA.VV. (2002). Molini Marzoli Massari. Un recupero di eccellenza. La Tecnocity di Busto Arsizio. Busto Arsizio: Macchione editore.
- AA.VV. (2004). Busto Arsizio, anno 1604 e dintorni. Busto Arsizio: Edizioni de "la Provvidenza".
- Augusto Spada (2004). Conoscere la città di/Getting to know the city of Busto Arsizio. Busto Arsizio: Freeman editrice.
- AA.VV. (2006). La chiesa di San Michele. Origine e storia, 2 voll. Busto Arsizio: Arti Grafiche Baratelli s.n.c.
- Francesco Ogliari (2006). Milano in tram. Storia del trasporto pubblico milanese. Hoepli editore.
- Baroffio, Arnaldo (2017). 10 giugno 1940. Conseguenti episodi reali, la guerra dell'Italia dal 1940 al 1945 e infine: il disegnato destino di Mussolini. Albatros.
