= Enrico Castiglioni =

Italian architect, painter and sculptor

- Born: 29 January 1914; Busto Arsizio, Lombardy, Italy
- Died: 6 November 2000 (aged 86); Busto Arsizio, Lombardy, Italy
- Spouse: Lorena Fausti

Enrico Richino Castiglioni (1914-2000) was an Italian writer, engineer, and architect best known for his unbuilt and frequently unbuildable concepts for buildings. Castiglioni attended the Polytechnic University of Milan, graduating with a degree in civil engineering in 1934.

== Biography ==
Born in 1914 into a family of Busto entrepreneurs, in 1937 he received a degree in Civil engineering from the Polytechnic University of Milan with highest honors and in 1939 qualified as an architect at the Faculty of Architecture in Rome. The following year he married Lorena Fausti, a Pennsylvania Italian, by whom he had four children-Stefano (with whom he collaborated on many works beginning in 1968), Giuliano, Monica and Marina. Between 1965 and 1973 he was professor in charge at the Faculty of Letters and Philosophy of the Università Cattolica del Sacro Cuore of History and theory of theatrical space. From 1971 to 1977 he was president of the Order of Architect of the Province of Varese.

On June 23, 2015, on the eve of the patron saint's day, the walkway in front of the Busto Arsizio Civic Librarywas named after Richino Castiglioni.

== Gallery ==
Notable projects
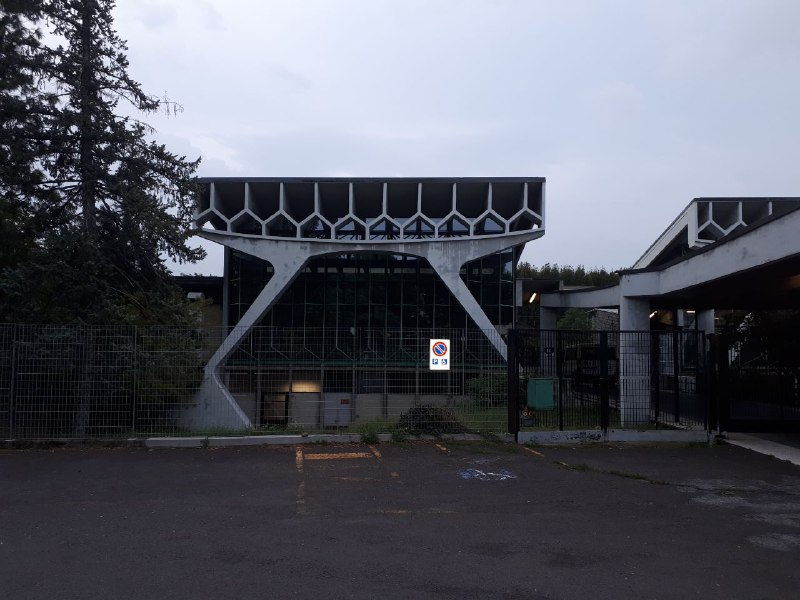
Centro di Formazione Professionale ENAIP in Busto Arsizio

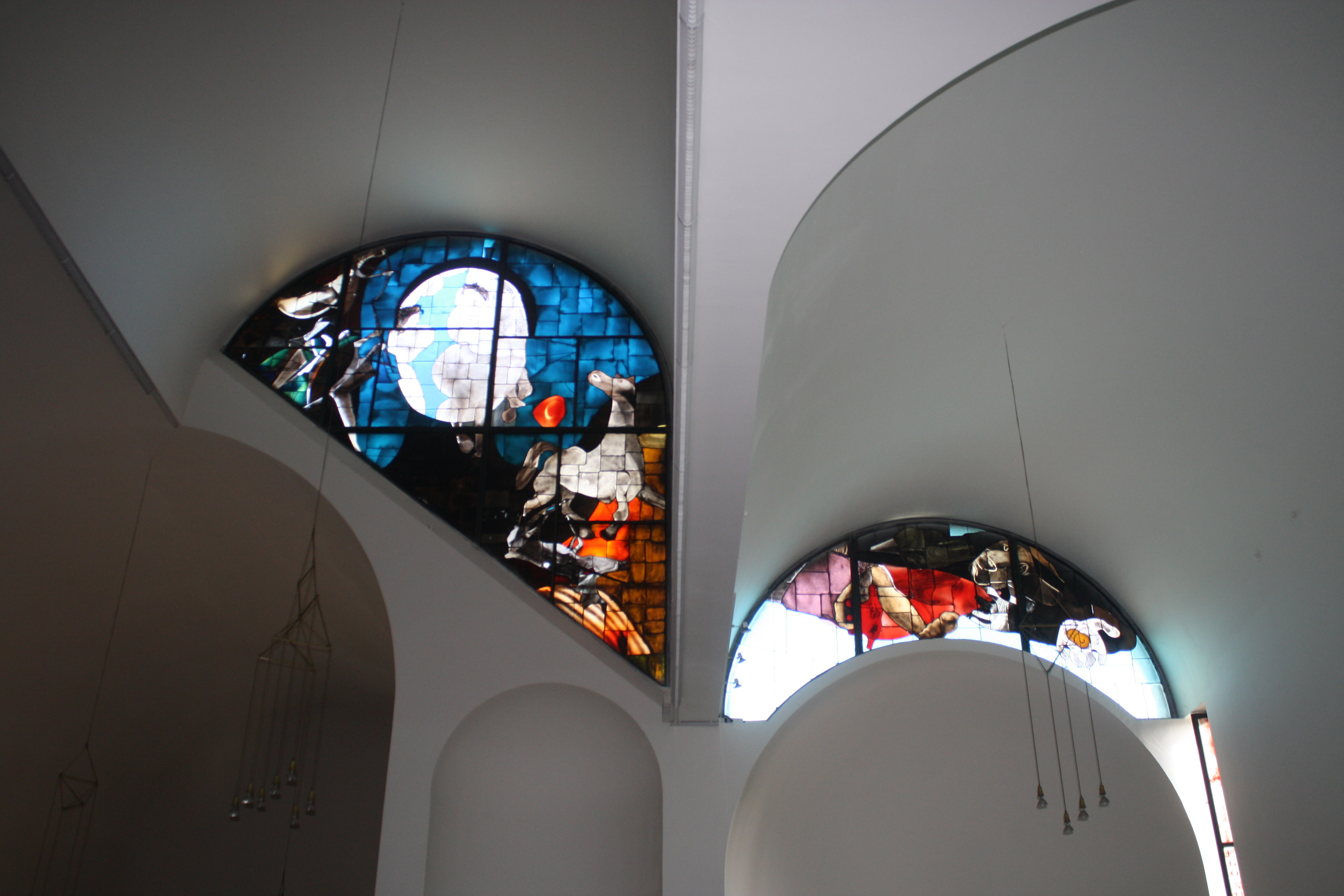
Santi Nazario e Celso in Gorla Minore
