= Castoldi (company) =

French automobile manufacturer

The Castoldi was a French automobile manufacturer in Lyon around 1900. The company was founded as a bicycle builder, but also produced a handful of motorcycles and voiturettes.
