= Pietro Antonio Crespi Castoldi =

Italian Catholic priest and historian

Pietro Antonio Crespi Castoldi (Busto Arsizio 7 February 1557 - 10 November 1615) was an Italian historian and Catholic priest.

== Biography ==
He was born on 7 February 1557 in Busto Arsizio, and was ordained a priest in 1581 by Charles Borromeo. He was a priest in Morazzone, a small town near Varese.

He remained priest at Morazzone until 1589, when he returned to Busto Arsizio, to curate the Basilica of San Giovanni Battista, after an epidemic hit much of the congregation. He also served as curator of the Basilica's archives.

In 1614 he wrote “De oppido Busti relationes”. Written in Latin, it became one of his most important works, and was translated by Luigi Belotti into Italian from 1925 to 1927.

== Cited Works ==
- Adelio Bellotti (1998). "Un cronista e storico da ricordare e riscoprire: Pietro Antonio Crespi Castoldi". Almanacco della Famiglia Bustocca per l'anno 1998. Busto Arsizio: La Famiglia Bustocca. pp. 6–16.
