= Textile museum =

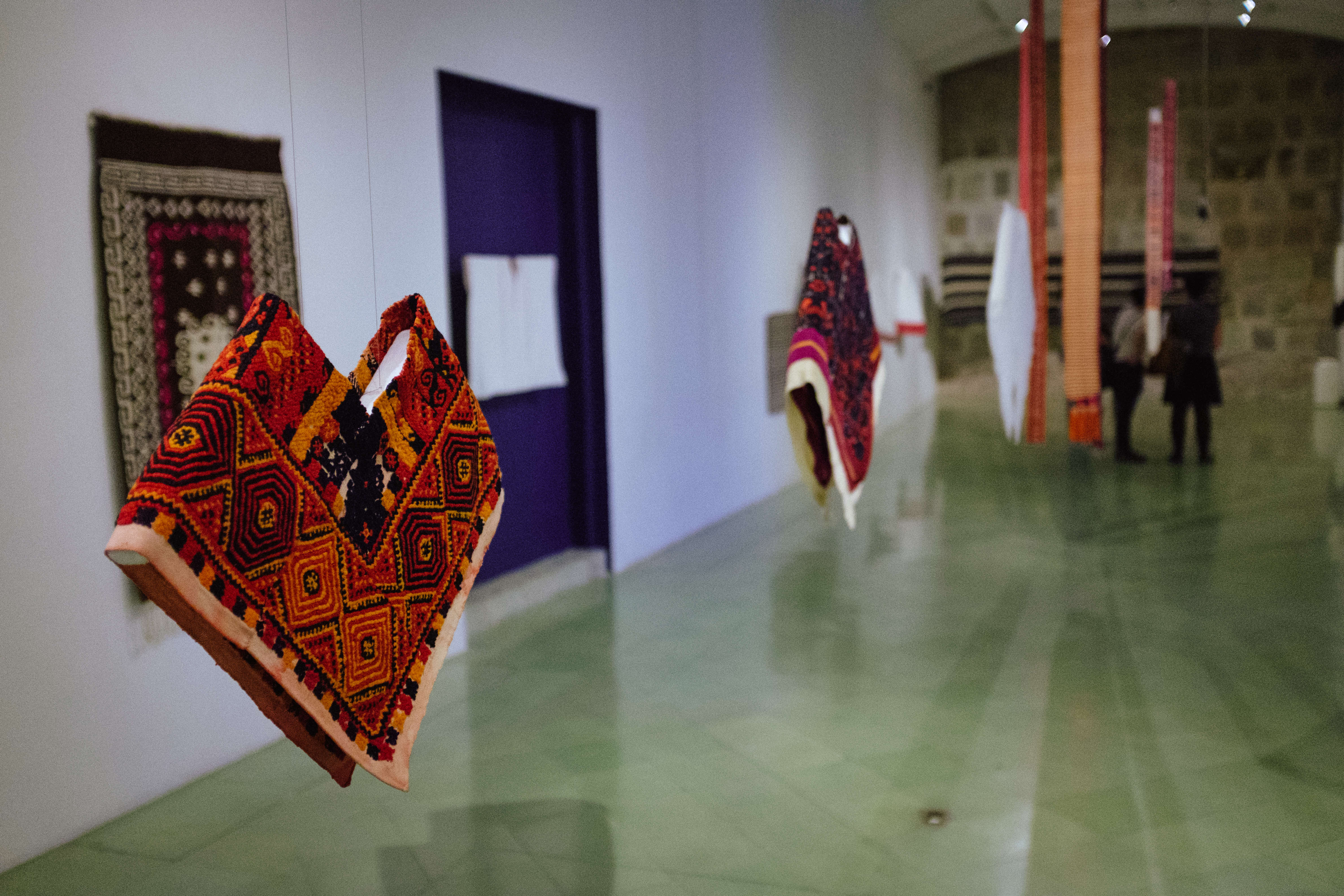
Exhibit at a textile museum in Mexico

A textile museum is a museum with exhibits relating to the history and art of textiles, including:

- textile industries and manufacturing, often located in former factories or buildings involved in the design and production of yarn, cloth, and clothing
- agriculture and farming related to textile materials such as silk, cotton, and wool
- functional use of textiles such as for clothing and bedding
- textiles used in decorative arts, such as for fashion, carpets, tapestries, embroidery, lace, and quilts
- the cultural and historical use of textiles in ceremonies, rituals, and other practices

== Asia ==
=== Azerbaijan ===
- Azerbaijan Carpet Museum
- Shusha Carpet Museum (and former Shushi Carpet Museum)

=== Bhutan ===
- Bhutan Textile Museum

=== China ===
- China National Silk Museum, Zheijiang
- Nantong Museum, Jiangsu
- Suzhou Silk Museum, Jiangsu

=== India ===
- Calico Museum of Textiles
- National Handicrafts and Handlooms Museum, New Delhi
- Sanskriti Museums

=== Indonesia ===
- Pekalongan Batik Museum, Central Java
- Textile Museum (Jakarta), West Jakarta

=== Iran ===
- Carpet Museum of Iran, Tehran

=== Iraq ===
- Kurdish Textile Museum, Iraqi Kurdistan

=== Japan ===
- Kyoto Costume Institute
- Nishijin Textile Center
- Shiozawa Tsumugi Fabric Museum
- Suntory Museum of Art, Tokyo
- Yokohama Silk Museum, Yokohama

=== Lebanon ===
- Bsous Silk Museum,

=== Malaysia ===
- National Textile Museum, Kuala Lumpur
- Merdeka Textile Museum, Kuala Lumpur
- Textile Museum Sarawak, Kuching

=== South Korea ===
- Chojun Textile and Quilt Art Museum, Seoul
- Chung Young Yang Embroidery Museum, Seoul
- Han Sang Soo Embroidery Museum, Seoul
- Museum of Korean Embroidery, Seoul

=== Thailand ===
- Queen Sirikit Museum of Textiles, Thailand

=== Turkmenistan ===
- Turkmen Carpet Museum, Turkmenistan

=== Vietnam ===
- Nam Định Textile Museum, Vietnam

== Central America ==
- Ixchel Museum of Indigenous Textiles and Clothing, Guatemala

== Europe ==
=== Belgium ===
- ModeMuseum Antwerpen
- Museum of Industry (Ghent)

=== Czech Republic ===
- Museum of Textile in Česká Skalice

=== Denmark ===
- Designmuseum Denmark

=== Finland ===
- Craft Museum of Finland
- Valvilla Wool Museum

=== France ===
- Bargoin Museum
- Broderie de Fontenoy-le-Château, Vosges
- Cité de la Dentelle et de la Mode, Pas-de-Calais
- Cité internationale de la tapisserie, Aubusson
- Gobelins Manufactory, Paris
- Textile Arts Museum, Lyon

=== Germany ===
- Augsburg textile and industry museum
- Bocholt textile museum
- LVR Industrial Museum
- Müller Cloth Mill
- Nordwolle
- Textilfabrik Cromford

=== Italy ===
- Museum of Calabrian textile, silk, costume and fashion handicrafts
- Museo di Palazzo Mocenigo
- Museum of Textiles and Industry of Busto Arsizio
- Prato Textile Museum

=== The Netherlands ===
- De Museumfabriek
- Museum Het Leids Wevershuis, Leiden
- Textile Museum (Tilburg)

=== Norway ===
- The Textile Industry Museum, Bergen

=== Poland ===
- Central Museum of Textiles, Łódź
- Museum of Technology and Textile Industry
- Weaver's House Museum

=== Portugal ===
- Museu dos Têxteis, Castelo Branco

=== Romania ===
- National Museum of the Romanian Peasant, Bucharest

=== Spain ===
- Can Marfà Knitwear Museum, Catalonia
- mNACTEC, Catalonia
- Museo del Traje, Madrid
- Museu Tèxtil i d'Indumentària, Catalonia
- Premià de Mar Textile Printing Museum, Catalonia
- Textile Museum and Documentation Centre, Catalonia

=== Sweden ===
- Textile Museum of Borås

=== United Kingdom ===
- American Museum and Gardens, England
- Andrew Carnegie Birthplace Museum, Scotland
- Bancroft Shed, England
- Bankfield Museum, West Yorkshire, England
- Borders Textile Townhouse, Scotland
- Bradford Industrial Museum, England
- Coldharbour Mill Working Wool Museum, Devon, England
- Colne Valley Museum, West Yorkshire, England
- Dalgarven Mill – Museum of Ayrshire Country Life and Costume, North Ayrshire, Scotland
- Derby Silk Mill, Derby, England
- Devonshire Collection of Period Costume
- Fan Museum, London
- Fashion and Textile Museum
- Fashion Museum, Bath, Somerset, England
- Friends Meeting House, Kendal, which houses the Quaker Tapestry
- Gayle Mill, North Yorkshire, England
- George Waterston Memorial Centre and Museum, Fair Isle, Scotland
- Hat Works, Greater Manchester, England
- Helmshore Mills Textile Museum (closed), Lancashire, England
- The Lace Guild
- Lewis Textile Museum (closed), Lancashire, England
- Low Mill, West Yorkshire, England
- Museum of Carpet, Worcestershire, England
- National Wool Museum, Carmarthenshire, Wales
- Paisley Museum and Art Galleries, Scotland
- Paisley Thread Mill Museum, Scotland
- Pickford's House Museum, Derby, England
- Quarry Bank Mill, Cheshire, England
- Queen Street Mill, Lancashire, England
- Quilt Museum and Gallery, York, England
- Shetland Museum, Scotland
- Shetland Textile Working Museum, Scotland
- Signal Tower Museum, Angus, Scotland
- The Silk Museum, Macclesfield, Cheshire, England
- Stott Park Bobbin Mill, Cumbria, England
- Thwaite Mills, West Yorkshire, England
- Verdant Works, Dundee, Scotland
- Victoria and Albert Museum, London, England (and Weaving for Walls exhibition)
- Wardown Park Museum, Bedfordshire, England
- Warner Textile Archive, Essex, England
- Weavers' Triangle, Lancashire, England
- Wellbrook Beetling Mill, Northern Ireland
- Whitchurch Silk Mill, Hampshire, England

== North America ==
=== Canada ===
- Costume Museum of Canada, Manitoba
- Textile Museum of Canada, Ontario
- Wile Carding Mill, Nova Scotia

=== Mexico ===
- La Constancia Mexicana
- Museo de Trajes Regionales, Chiapas
- Textile Museum of Oaxaca

=== United States ===
- American Textile History Museum, Massachusetts (closed)
- Audie Murphy American Cotton Museum, Texas
- Bates Mill, Maine
- Belknap Mill Museum, New Hampshire
- Boott Mills, Massachusetts
- Brigham City Museum of Art & History, Utah
- Charles River Museum of Industry & Innovation, Massachusetts
- Cooper Hewitt, Smithsonian Design Museum, New York
- The Cotton Museum, Tennessee
- Embroidery Museum and Resource Center, Kentucky
- The Fabric Workshop and Museum, Philadelphia
- Falls Mill, Tennessee
- George Washington University Museum and Textile Museum, Washington, D.C.
- Great Lakes Quilt Center, Michigan
- International Quilt Museum, Nebraska
- Kansas City Garment District Museum, Missouri
- LSU Museum of Art, Louisiana
- Marie Webster House, Indiana
- Museum of Work and Culture, Rhode Island
- National Quilt Museum, Kentucky
- New England Quilt Museum, Massachusetts
- Pacific Northwest Quilt and Fiber Arts Museum, Washington (state)
- Quadrangle (Springfield, Massachusetts)
- Rocky Mountain Quilt Museum, Colorado
- Ruth Funk Center for Textile Arts, Florida
- San Jose Museum of Quilts & Textiles, California
- Scottish Tartans Museum and Heritage Center, North Carolina
- Slater Mill, Rhode Island
- Southeastern Quilt & Textile Museum, Georgia
- Stillwater Mill, Rhode Island
- Textile Heritage Museum, North Carolina
- Watkins Woolen Mill State Park and State Historic Site, Missouri
- Weaving Room of Crossnore School, North Carolina
- Western Reserve Historical Society, Ohio
- Willamette Heritage Center, Oregon
- Windham Textile and History Museum, Connecticut

== Oceania ==
- Ararat Gallery TAMA, Victoria, Australia
- National Wool Museum (Geelong), Australia

== South America ==
- Center for Traditional Textiles of Cusco

== See also ==
- Fashion museum
- Lists of museums
