= Round Tower (Kuching) =

Fort in Kuching, Sarawak, Malaysia

Coordinates: 1°33′16″N 110°19′50″E

The Round Tower
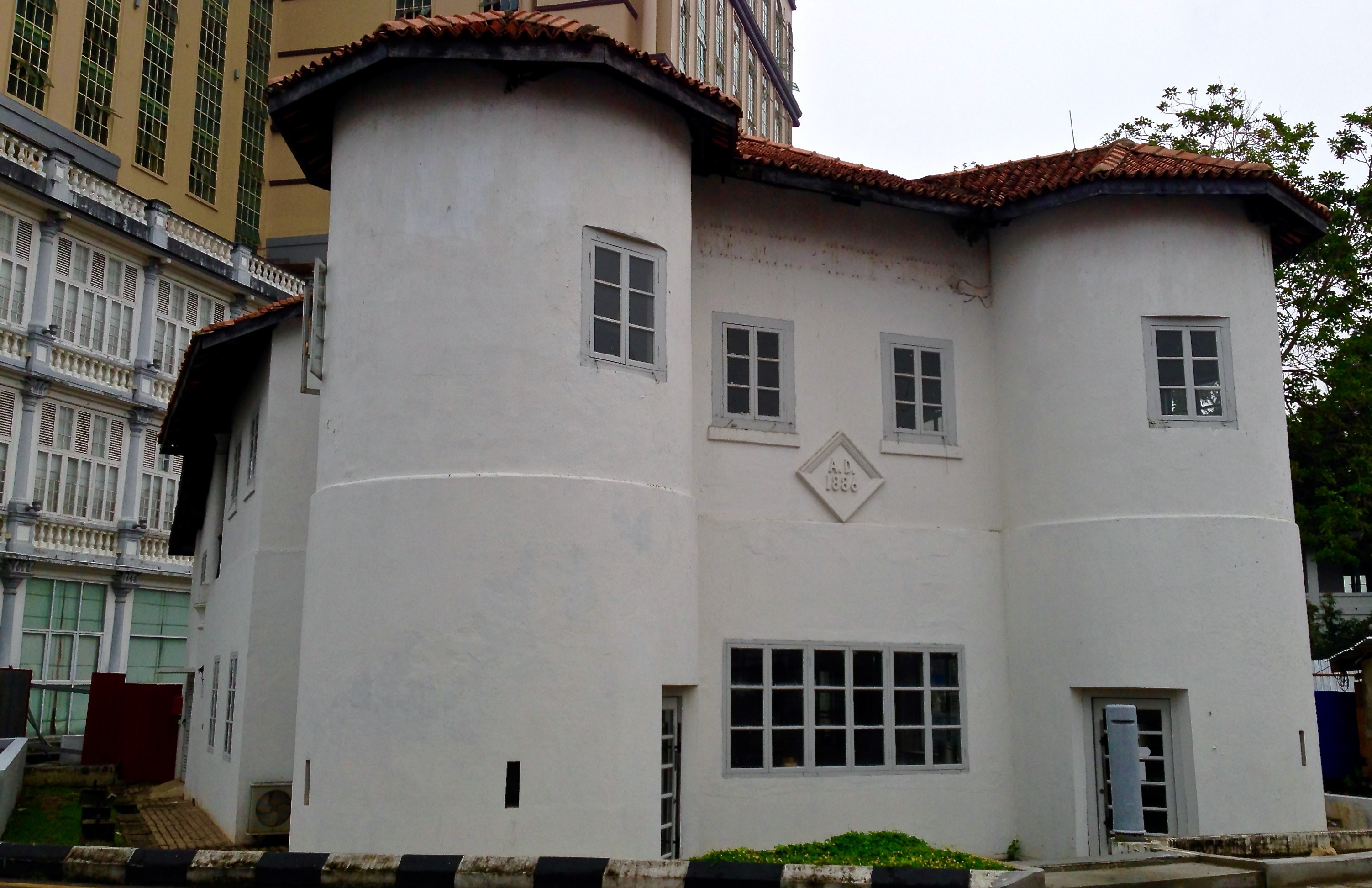
- Interactive map of the The Round Tower area

General information
- Type: Fort
- Location: Jalan Tun Abang Haji Openg, Kuching, Sarawak, Malaysia
- Completed: 1886

Technical details
- Floor count: 2

The Round Tower is a historical building in Kuching, Sarawak, Malaysia.

== History ==
The Round Tower was constructed in 1886 as a fort but was never used for military purposes. Up until 1947 it was used as a public dispensary serving the adjoining hospital (today the Textile Museum Sarawak). Later, it was occupied by the Labour Department and then by the judiciary as a court registry. In 2004, it was it was used by the Sarawak Craft Council who displayed handicrafts, and around 2000 it was converted into a cafe and restaurant.

== Description ==
The building consists of two floors with two round towers at its corners, with the date of its construction inscribed on its facade. It was registered as a state heritage building under the Sarawak Heritage Ordinance 1993 (SCHO) in 1985.

== See also ==
- Square Tower
