= Wile Carding Mill =

Mill and museum in Nova Scotia, Canada

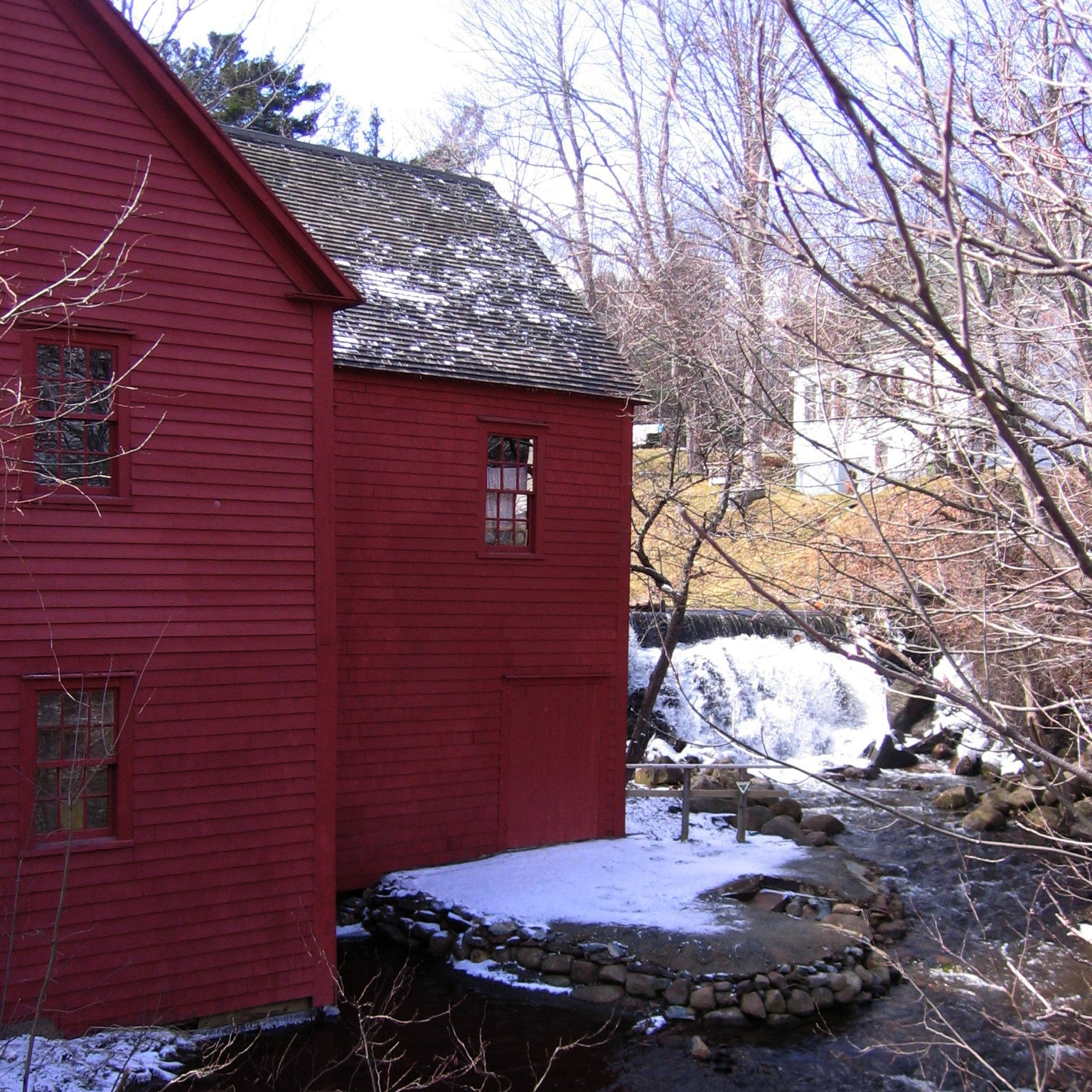
- Established: 1968
- Location: Bridgewater, Nova Scotia, Canada.
- Type: carding mill, museum
- Website: cardingmill.novascotia.ca

The Wile Carding Mill is a defunct but still operational carding mill, in Bridgewater, Nova Scotia, Canada. The mill is now owned by the Province of Nova Scotia and operated as a museum by the DesBrisay Museum.

This water-powered mill was owned and operated by the Wile family from 1860 to 1968. The Wiles ran the mill but employed a number of workers, usually unmarried women, to operate the machinery. The mill was powered by a 7-horsepower (5 kW) overshot waterwheel using the water of Shady Brook, a tributary of the Lahave River.

It became a Registered Heritage Property in Bridgewater in 2013.

== See also ==
- List of museums in Canada
- Nova Scotia Museum
- Textile museum
