= Square Tower (Sarawak) =

Fortress in Kuching, Sarawak, Malaysia

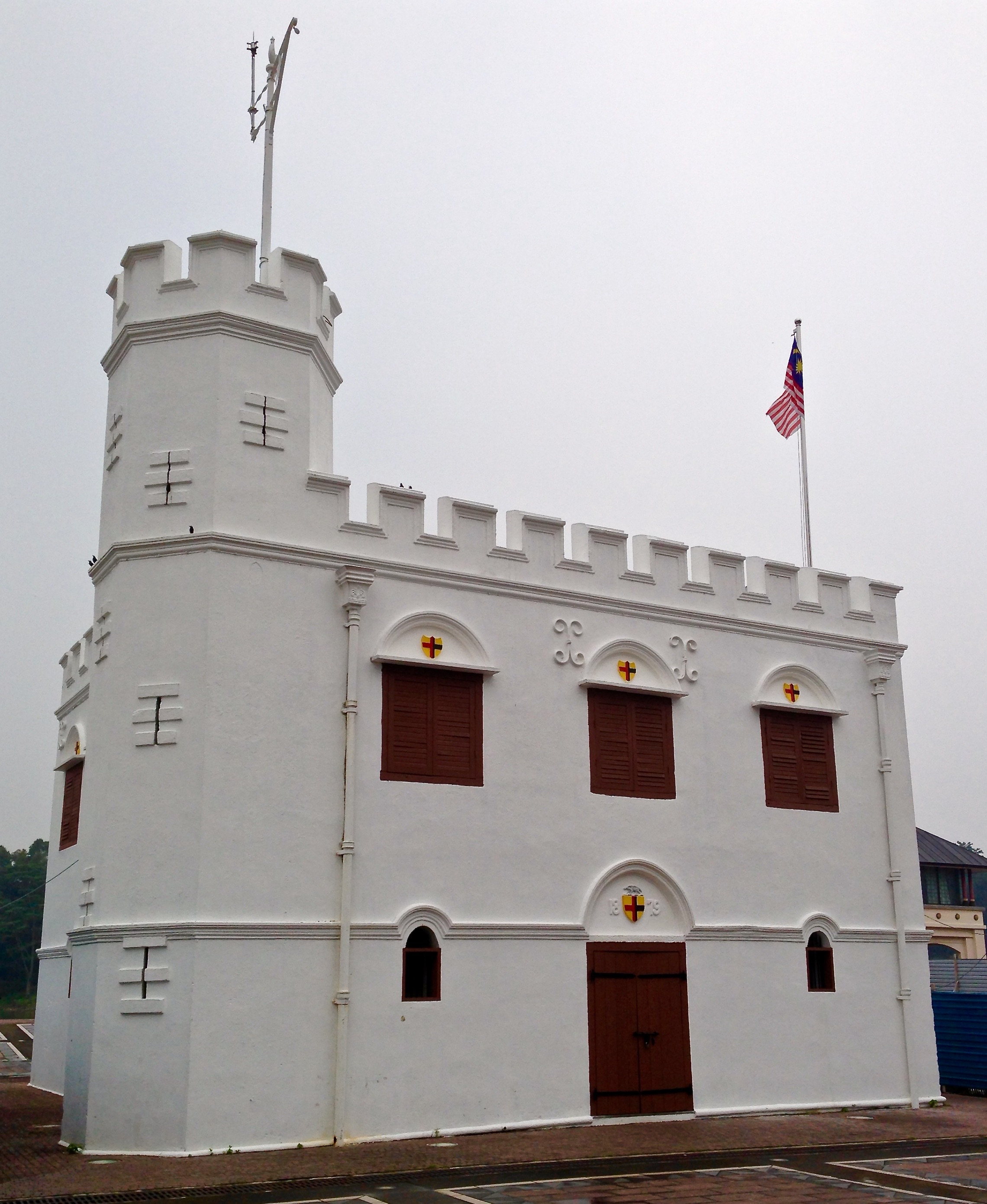
- Interactive map of the Square Tower area

General information
- Type: Fortress
- Location: Kuching, Sarawak, Malaysia
- Coordinates: 1°33′37.2″N 110°20′44.0″E
- Completed: 1879

The Square Tower is a fort in Kuching, Sarawak, Malaysia.

== History ==
The building was originally constructed in 1879 as a prison. It was then later turned into a fortress.

== Architecture ==
The building bears the Brooke era coat of arms.

== See also ==
- Round Tower
- List of tourist attractions in Malaysia
