= Museum of Technology and Textile Industry =

Coordinates: 49°49′12″N 19°2′41″E

The Museum of Technology and Textile Industry – a branch of the Museum in Bielsko-Biała, Poland – was founded on 1 January 1979 with the aim of evidencing the traditions of the local wool industry centre by means of collecting machines, devices and documents related to this field of production. Apart from this the Museum also exhibits items connected with firefighting, printing and metal machine industry. The Museum occupies some parts of the Büttners' former cloth factory, which used to be one of the biggest textile factories in Bielsko.

== History of the Museum ==
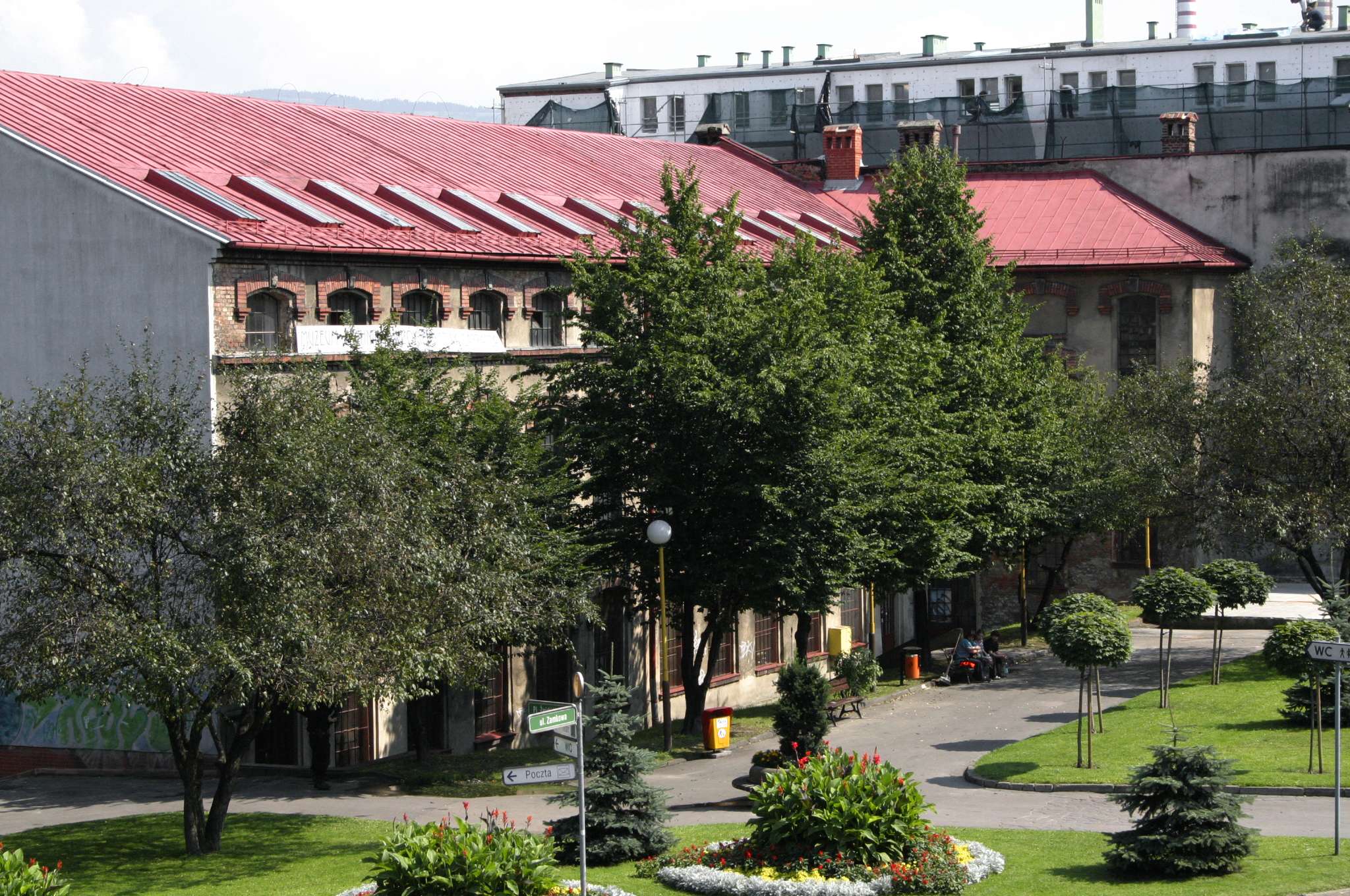
The Museum of Technology and Textile Industry in Bielsko-Biała.

The Museum of Textile Technology took over the exhibits connected with weaver's craft from the main seat of the Museum in Bielsko-Biała, and then gradually it enriched its collection with machines and devices taken from the local textile factories. At first the branch occupied the buildings of ZPW Rytex (Wool Industry Works), but in 1983 the museum was relocated in the part of the ZPW Bawelana buildings. The renovation works in the buildings started in 1992, and the first part of the exhibition was open for public on 2 December 1996. The exhibition on the first floor was opened a year later.

Till 1995 the branch was called The Museum of Textile Technology. However it received lots of items connected with other kinds of technology so its name was changed into the present one. Along with the machines and devices connected with textile industry, which take up most of the exhibition, there are also items devoted to the history of Bielsko-Biała fire-brigade and waterworks, a small printing room and a so-called museum storage. Even the traditions of the local metal processing industry were not omitted. Depending on the financial means a restoration of the further rooms and the extension of the exhibitions are planned.

The Museum occupies some of the buildings of the old cloth factory which used to belong to the Büttners family. The factory was one of the biggest textile factories at the time. In 1868 the local clothier master Karol Traugott Büttner bought a garden in the Żywiec Suburb, where he put up a two-storey building with annexes. In 1884 the company was inherited by his sons Karol Teodor and Gustaw Adolf who ran it as Karl Büttners Söhne (Karl Büttners Sons). They expanded the company. In 1889 the factory hall was put up on Sukinnicza Street, a boiler room was built and steam drive was introduced. In the first decade of the 20th century a storied factory hall with a vast garret was built, now housing the main part of the museum exhibition.

In the 1930s the company was taken over K.T. Büttner's sons: Karol August, Paweł Maurycy and Herbert Oskar, and G. A. Büttner's sons: Jan Karol and Kurt Ernest, and their brother-in-law, Erwin Kerger. With starting the carpet weaving mill they offered more products. The company owned the main factory and its branch in Biała which until 1910 was Krebok & Then cloth factory belonging to the Büttners. It burned down completely in the 1930s. Also a Kerger's dyeing house in Biała was in use.

After the World War II the nationalized factory in Bielsko was a part of the L. Lasek Textile Industry Works, later known as Bawelana factory B. After stopping the production in 1983 some of the factory objects were given to the Museum of Technology and Textile Industry.

== Exhibits ==
There are many kinds of textile products made from various raw materials. The museum exhibits mostly machines and devices used for producing woolen coarse textile including the famous Bielsko cloth. The exhibits are gathered in four rooms corresponding particular mills of the old factory.

In the Spinning Mill the sheep wool was turned into yarn. In this mill we can see a spinning waste cleaner, open raw material beater, willow used for opening and mixing the raw material, two carding machine sets (double- and triple-component, which turned the wool into roving, and finally the self-actor mule (spinning frame), where the roving changed into yarn. The last two machines produced by Bielsko machine factory G. Josephy's Erben at the end of the 19th century, belong to the unique monuments of the old textile technology. We also have here a tearing machine used for woolen rags, from which reclaimed fibers to produce low-quality yarn were obtained.

Next the yarn went to the Preliminary Treatment Mill. In here it was wound on the winding machines, the warp threads were prepared on the warping machines, while the weft threads on the weft-winders. The interesting objects here are mechanical warping machine produced in Bielsko Georg Schwabe machine factory in the 1930s, and the weft-winder by G.Josephy's Erben dating back to the beginnings of the 20th century. By the preliminary treatment mill one can also visit Master's office who supervised his workers.

In the Weaving Mill the warp and the weft were turned into textile by means of looms. The Museum presents a varied collection: manual vertical looms dating back to the Lusatian Culture (700-400 B.C.), wooden manual harness looms, and shuttleless pneumatic and rapier looms (1960s). On one of them we have a weaving process demonstrated. The exhibition is completed by rich collection of the pattern cards punching machines which controlled the Jacquard and harness looms.

Textiles, before taken to a warehouse, undergone many chemical and mechanical treatments, which took place in the Finishing Mill. In this part of the exhibition we can see a boiler used for dyeing wool and yarn, cylinder fulling mill for coarse textile, two power gig-mills (one with metal needles, the other with thistle) hand shears, and automatic shearing machine, and finally a textile folding machine. This exhibition is completed by laboratory devices, the collections of various shuttles, a catalogue of sample textiles produced in Bielsko and Biała (1928–1940), lithographies presenting local factories (ca.1870), as well as paintings and graphic arts connected with textile industry.

The Museum also presents many machines used to produce hats: cone carding machine, felting machines, hammer fulling mill, dyeing apparatus, drawing frame, sand press and others.

== Fire and water ==
The exceptional exhibitions are devoted to fire-fighting and the city waterworks. The former was prepared in the Spring 2004 on the occasion of 140th anniversary of the Bielsko-Biała Volunteer Fire Department. The Museum presents its own collection as well as souvenirs belonging to local headquarters of the National Fire Service, to Volunteer Fire Department from different city districts, as well as to private individuals. The largest exhibits are two horse-drawn carriages and the interwar sleighs equipped with fire hoses. In two showcases there are archival photographs (originals and replicas) showing fire stations in Bielsko and Biała, portraits of fire chiefs, a group of fire-fighters, emblems and badges, documents etc. Next, there are souvenirs connected with fire stations in Komorowice, Bystra, Lipnik, Leszczyny, Hałcnów and Straconka. The Exhibition is completed by OSP (Volunteer Fire Department) units' banners, fire-fighting and life-saving equipment, a collection of nozzles, helmets and belts.

The exhibition devoted to the history of water supply to Bielsko-Biała is the most recent one (November 2005). It was prepared on the occasion of the 110th anniversary of Bielsko waterworks launch. One can find here many original technical drawings dating back to the end of the 19th and the beginning of the 20th century. Kept in the AQUA S.A. Company in Bielsko-Biała this is the first time they have been presented to the public. The drawings are: never executed Bielsko-Biała waterworks project by engineer Grahn (1887) with the aim to build water intake on the River Soła in Kęty-Podlasie, the project of waterworks for the City of Biała with water intake in Straconka by engineer Pfister (1898), and the project of the dam in Wapienica by Dyckerhoff & Widmann company (1927). The technical drawings are complemented by various postcards, photos and archives available thanks to National Archives in Katowice, Bielsko-Biała branch as well as a few old water meters.

== Metal machine industry ==
The rapid development of the textile industry resulted in the appearance of the metal machine industry in Bielsko and Biała. It provided the local factories with machines and devices. The next part of the exhibition is devoted to that industry. The Museum holds an antique lathe (the beginning of the 20th century), various drills, a collection of manual blacksmith tools. The exhibit includes a 22-kilo album containing photos depicting the board of directors and the employers working in the textile machinery factory, Gustav Josephy's Erben. The exhibition is completed by photographs and paintings connected with the metal machine industry.

== Printing room ==
A separate room is occupied by the exhibition devoted to printing techniques. There are two machine presses (19th/20th century) and two printing machines. The new generation devices are English monotype with a taster i.e. a machine used for programming and casting single types (1960) and a Russian built typesetting machine (copy of the Linotype) used for casting whole lines of text (1982). The exhibition is completed by various printing types as well as printing blocks decorated with Secession elements used for printing posters and placards.

== Museum storage ==
Opened in 1996 the exhibition presented only machines and devices connected with the textile industry. However, the Museum also received objects connected with other fields of technology, so in 2002 a new separate exhibition was opened. The storage holds radios, TV sets, tape recorders, gramophones, counting machines and typewriters. There is also a large collection of household supplies such as irons (with heaters, coal irons, gas iron] and others), sewing machines, manual wooden washing machines, one of the oldest electric drum washing machines (1930s), mangles, wringers, vacuum cleaners, scales, paraffin lamps, meat cutting machines, bread cutters and many others.

== Bibliography ==
- Kenig, Piotr & Chorąży, Bogusław Zarys Dziejów Bielskiego Przemysłu i Przewodnik po Ekspozycji Włókienniczej, 1st. Ed, Museum in Bielsko-Biała, Bielsko-Biała 2006, ISBN 83-88105-10-8.
