= Textile Museum Sarawak =

Museum in Kuching, Sawarak, Malaysia

- Muzium Tekstil Sarawak
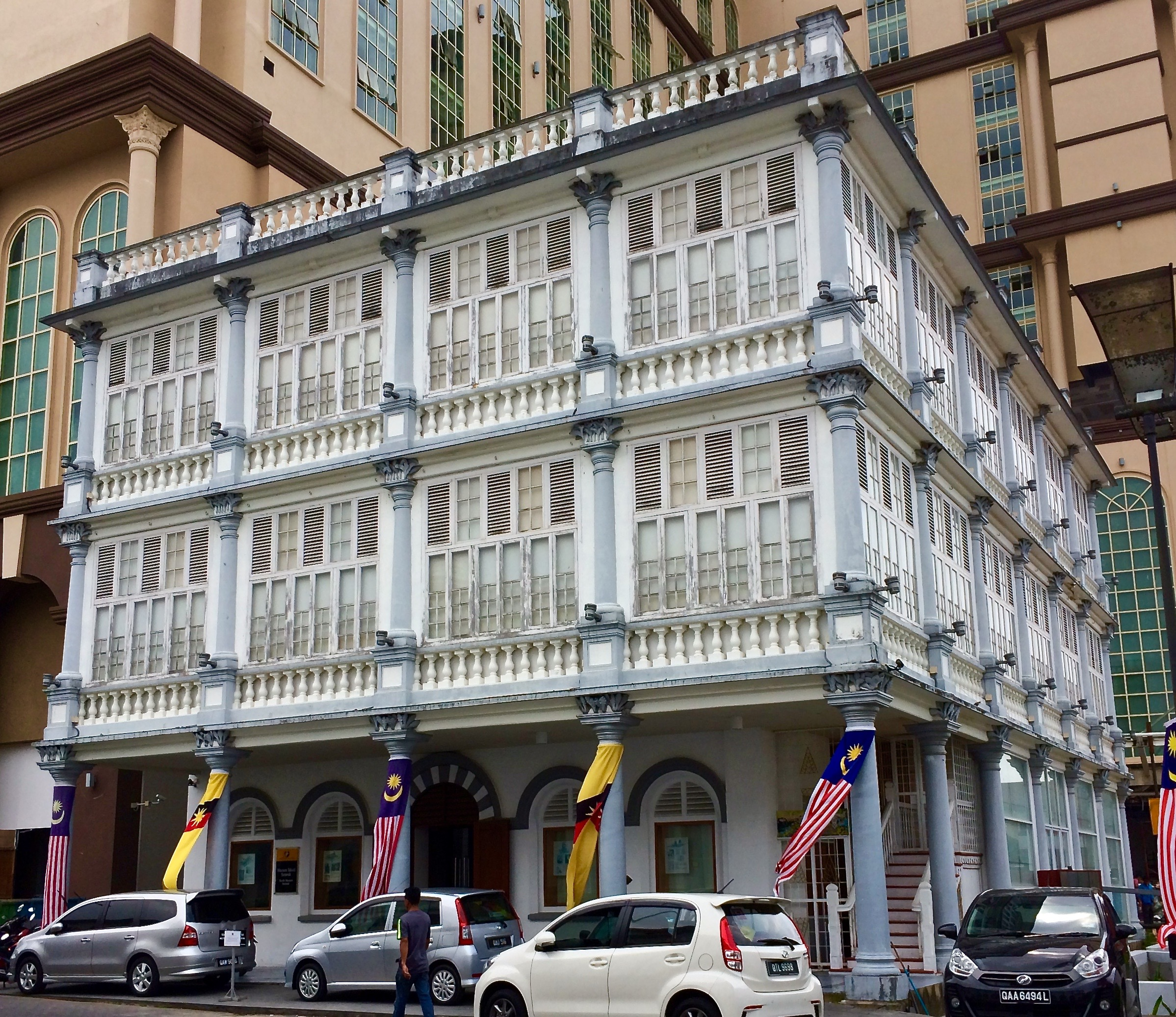
- Established: August 2000
- Location: Kuching, Sarawak, Malaysia
- Coordinates: 1°33′30.8″N 110°20′41.3″E
- Type: museum

The Textile Museum Sarawak (Malay: Muzium Tekstil Sarawak) is a textile museum in Kuching, Sarawak, Malaysia.

== History ==
The museum building was originally built in 1907 as medical center. It was then later housed the Education Department of Sarawak State Government. In August 2000, it was eventually turned into the Textile Museum Sarawak.

== Architecture ==
The museum is housed in a 3-story building with colonial British renaissance theme named the Pavilion Building. The upper two floors house the permanent exhibition.

== Exhibitions ==
The museum displays the textiles made by local communities in Sarawak, as well as traditional costumes and accessories. It also showcases the stages of textile manufacturing processes.

== See also ==
- List of museums in Malaysia
