= Museum of Textiles and Industry of Busto Arsizio =

Spinning and weaving museum in Busto Arsizio, Italy

Museum of Textiles and Industry
- Museo del Tessile e della Tradizione industriale
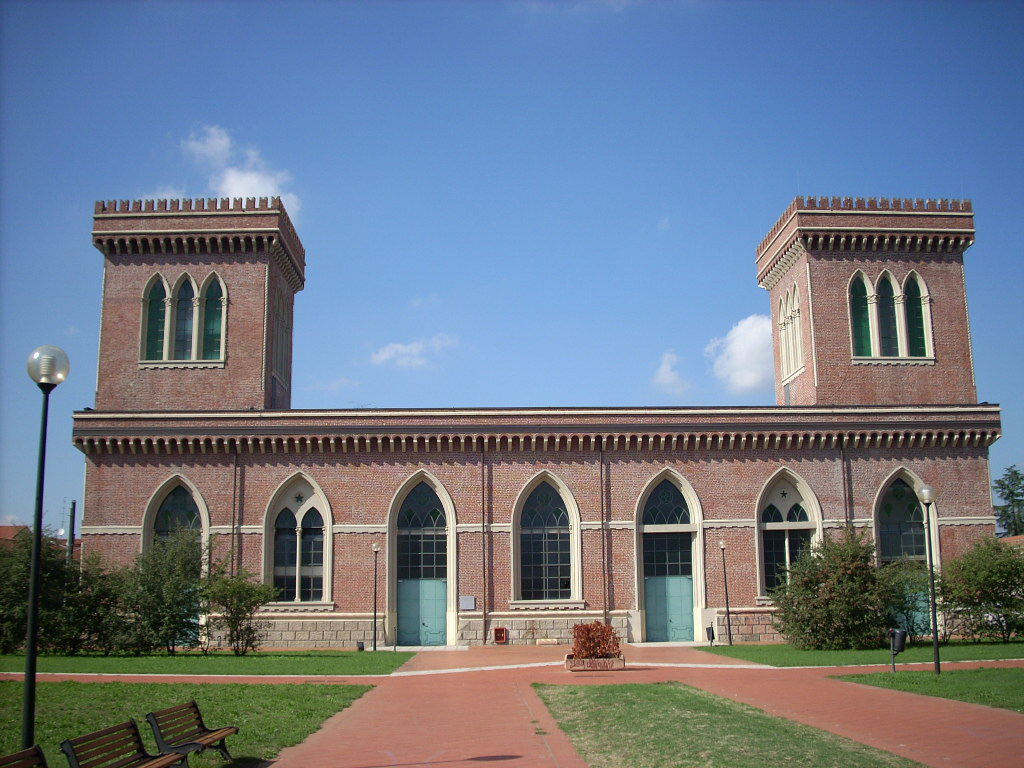
- Exterior view of the Museum in Busto Arsizio
- Former name: Cotonificio bustese
- Established: 1997
- Location: Busto Arsizio, Italy
- Coordinates: 45°36′53″N 8°50′49″E
- Type: Spinning and weaving
- Website: www.comune.bustoarsizio.va.it/index.php/aree-tematiche/cultura/museo-del-tessile
- Building details

General information
- Architectural style: Gothic Revival architecture and modern
- Construction started: 1857
- Completed: 1896
- Renovated: 1994 - 1997

Design and construction
- Architect: Camillo Crespi Balbi

The Museum of Textiles and Industry is one of the two museums in Busto Arsizio, Italy, that specialises in spinning and weaving. It was opened in 1997 to house objects, pictures and archive material representing Busto Arsizio's industrial history.

== Purpose ==
The museum aims to:

- Provide for the collection, preservation and promotion of objects coming from the local textile industry
- Promote cultural activities and information to help scientific research, historical and artistic information available in the different areas of expertise around the Museum.

== Ottolini’s Cotton Mill ==
The museum is located in one of the town's oldest industrial districts; Ottolini's Cotton Mill is, in fact, one of the first industrial settlements that was built outside the ancient centre of the former village of Busto Arsizio, in the immediate vicinity of St. Michael's.

The first project can be found in the National Archives of Varese in 1857. This building represents one of the best examples of the town's industrial archaeology, wisely maintaining its original features. In 1896, the building was designed with the characteristics of a brick-built medieval castle, with lancet windows, towers and battlements.

== Recent history ==
On 19 January 1978, the Cotton Mill ceased production because of its outdated equipment. The town of Busto Arsizio acquired the entire area and started the creation of a public park. In 1994, reconstruction of the main building was started. These works led to the establishment of the museum as a reaction to the economic transformation in the area, to preserve objects and memories of everyday life and work as a cultural memory of the region.

On 30 January 1997, after some years of restoration, the museum was officially reopened. The museum has three floors as well as two towers and gives the opportunity to follow a wide itinerary, connected with the textile production that was for a long period of time the pride of the local economy. The ground floor and the first floor are equipped with an alternative route which has been specially designed for the visually challenged.

== Exhibits ==
=== Ground floor ===
On the ground floor, in addition to a cafeteria and a conference room, there is also early spinning machinery, the large machines for weaving and finishing, and the first 19th-century systems for avoiding industrial accidents, such as fire extinguishers from the 19th century.

==== Spinning and preparation ====
In this area, near the hall, there is an old carding system and machinery framing used within the domestic system. On the walls there are paintings illustrating the textile manufacturing process.

==== Weaving ====
In the weaving department, there is the oldest and most important machine which deserves special attention as it originated from the old wood framing industry from 1813. This is a domestic hand loom used by peasant families. Finally, there is a department dedicated to the life of the workers, plus the two towers one of which is devoted to photography whilst the other explores the myths of the industrial factory in Busto Arsizio.

=== First floor ===
The first floor is dedicated to the history of Jacquard manufacturing, from the original machinery to computers. This level is important for "the room of experiences", where you can touch the different stages of cotton preparation and you can also see the packaging and delivery of the products.

==== Jacquard ====
The Jacquard area showcases the different machines which were used for this specialist embroidery process.

==== Finishing, packaging and delivery ====
In the display cabinets and depicted in the paintings are the old samples and original labels used by the leading local manufacturers from the mid-19th and early 20th century.

=== Second floor ===
On the second floor, you can see the stages of dyeing and printing fabric and you can also find many finished products, from specialised outfits of this century to new synthetic fibres. This includes astronaut uniform, Formula 1 jumpsuits and fashion clothing such as a Valentino dress.

==== Dyeing and printing ====
This section shows the original process of dyeing using vegetable colours, also showcased area ancient samples and original notes from chemists and dyers from the Busto area as well as Swiss and German workers form the Cantoni cotton mill.

In the printing area, there is a display of hand printing works and techniques.

==== Embroidery and schirpa ====
In the next room there is a display dedicated to schirpa, which is the traditional dowry of brides in the Alto Milanese area, using local fabrics. This includes lingerie, embroidered clothing, bedding, curtains and a tablecloth woven in the style of Leonardo. Also showcased is embroidery and lace from Gallarate.

==== Documents and office ====
This area has old office equipment and a laboratory as well as projects, original documents and rare photographs of the interiors of the factories, workers and some of the most important entrepreneurs of the Busto region, such as Enrico dell'Acqua.

==== Mechanical textile industry ====
This section presents documents and memories of the factories that emerged as a mechanical induced production of textile machinery. It was built on site until 1870, when this was purchased abroad.

=== Towers ===
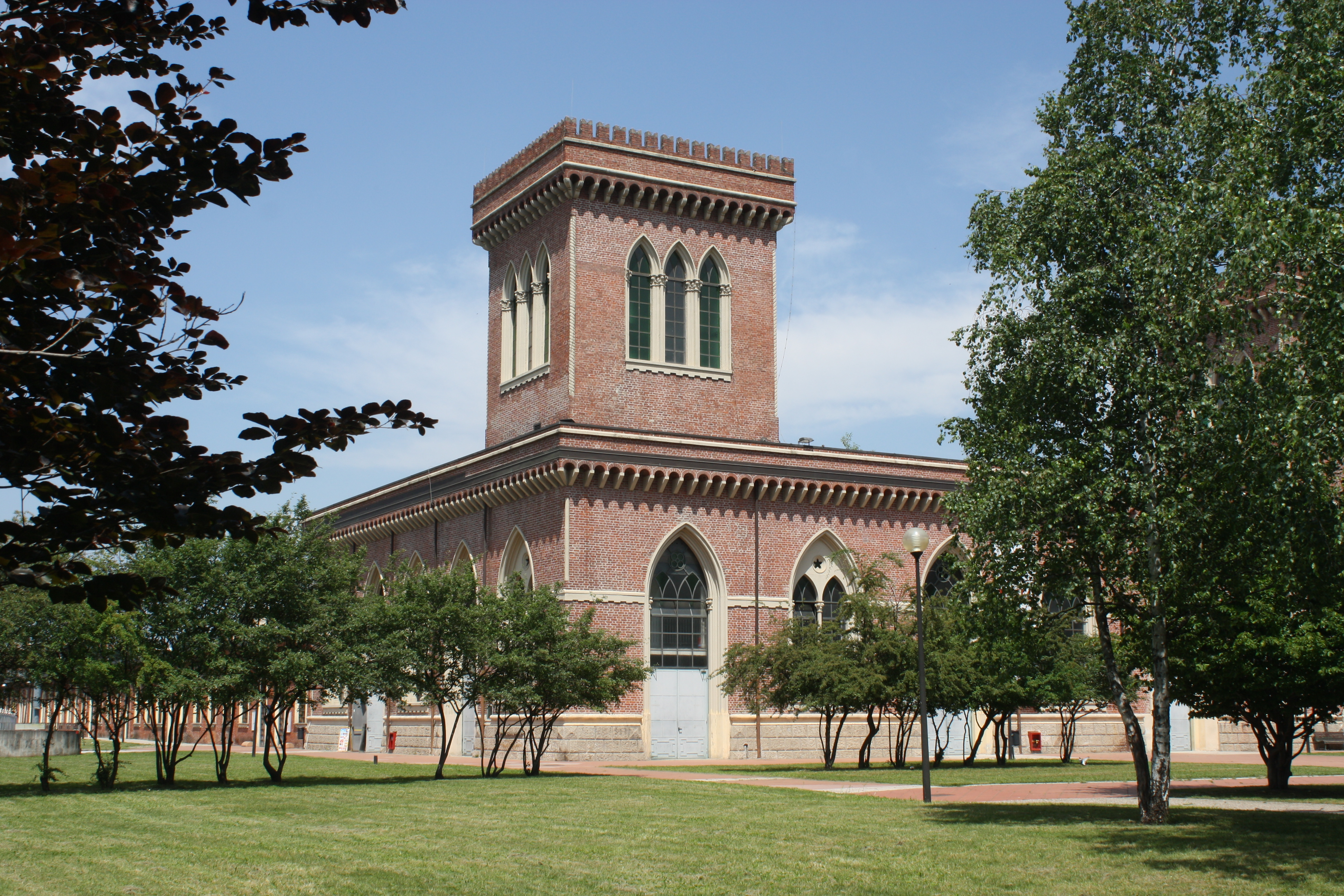
One of the towers

==== Paracchi Archives ====
The archives include a collection of views of Busto Arsizio, "Bustesi" portraits and studio material dating from the late 19th century.

==== Shoe-making ====
In this section, some items of the Borri footwear history are collected, which represent the evolution of production during the century-old history of this important firm.

== Gallery ==
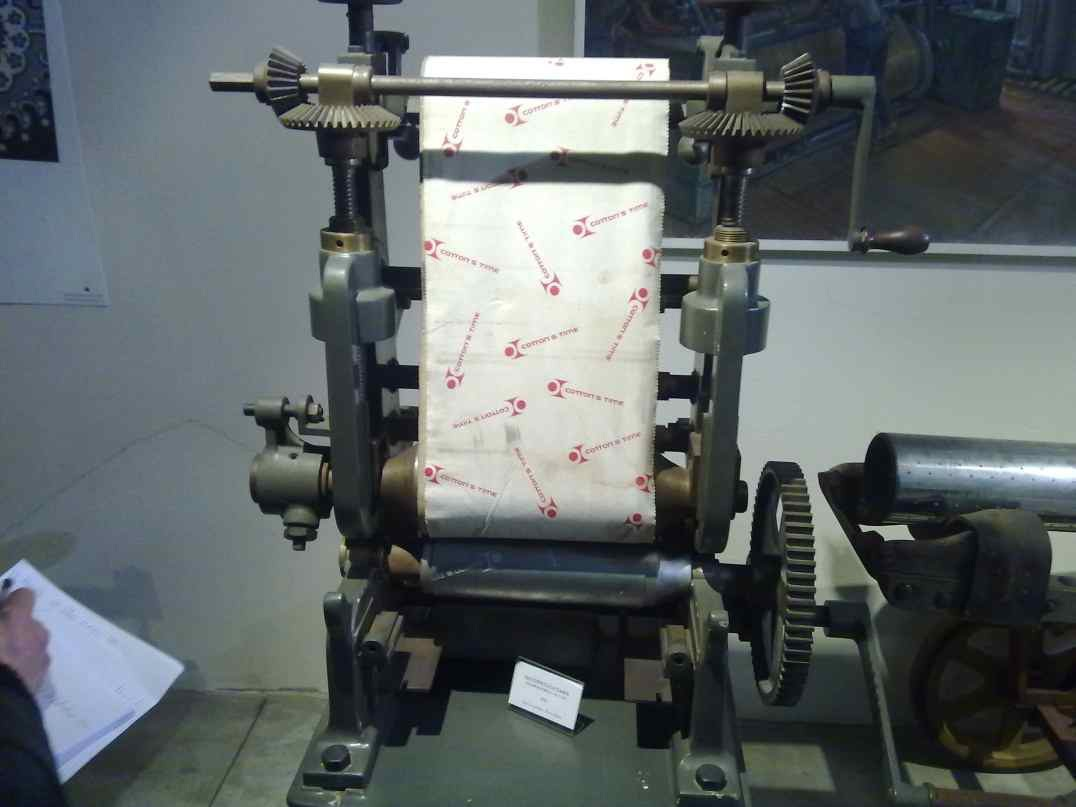
This machine prints the design onto the cloths.

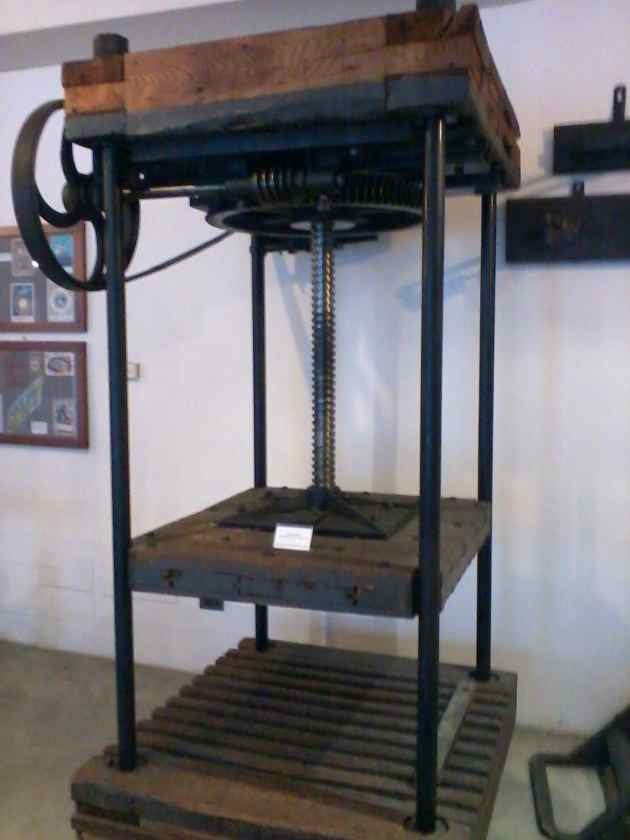
Textile press

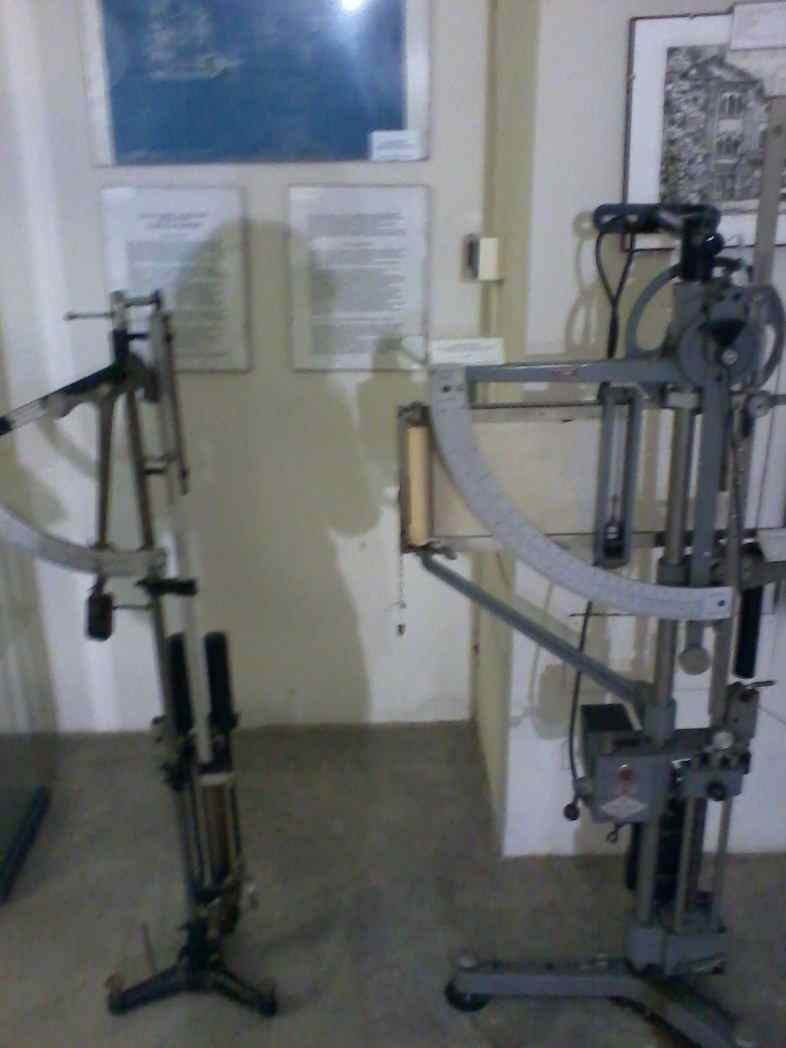
Dynamometer for measuring the resistance of the yarn tensile

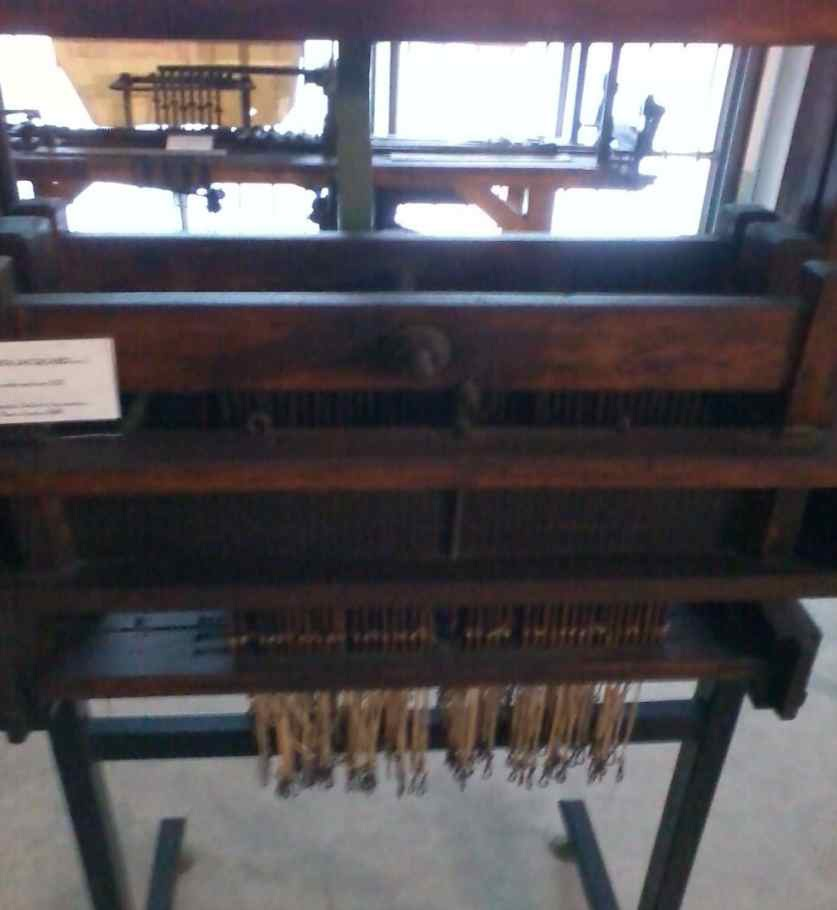
Jacquard's Machine

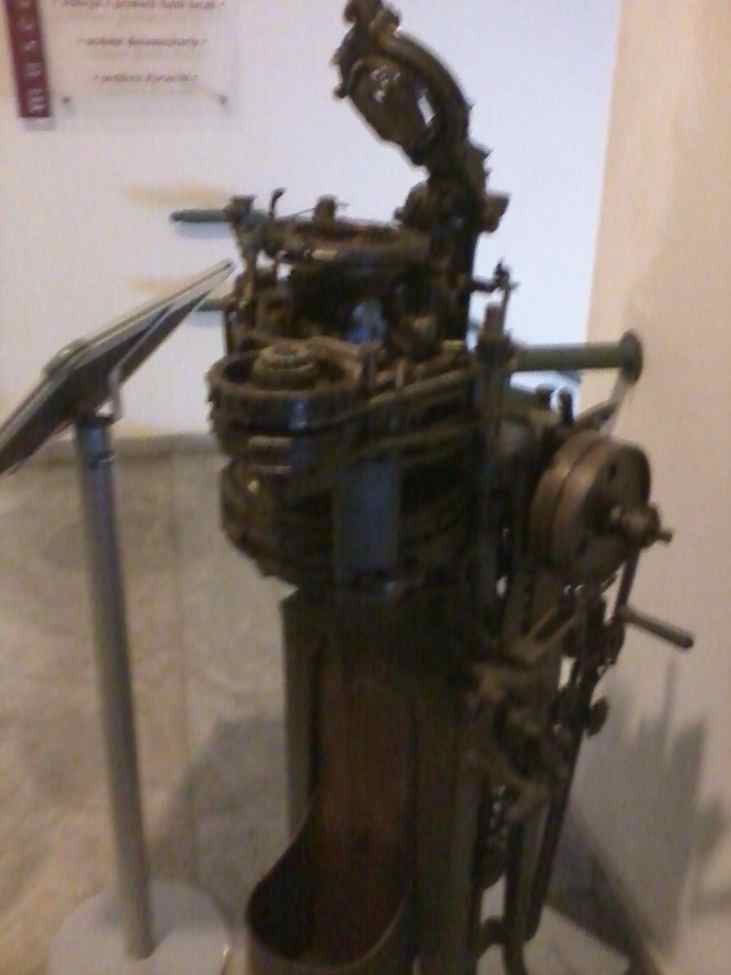
This machine creates men socks

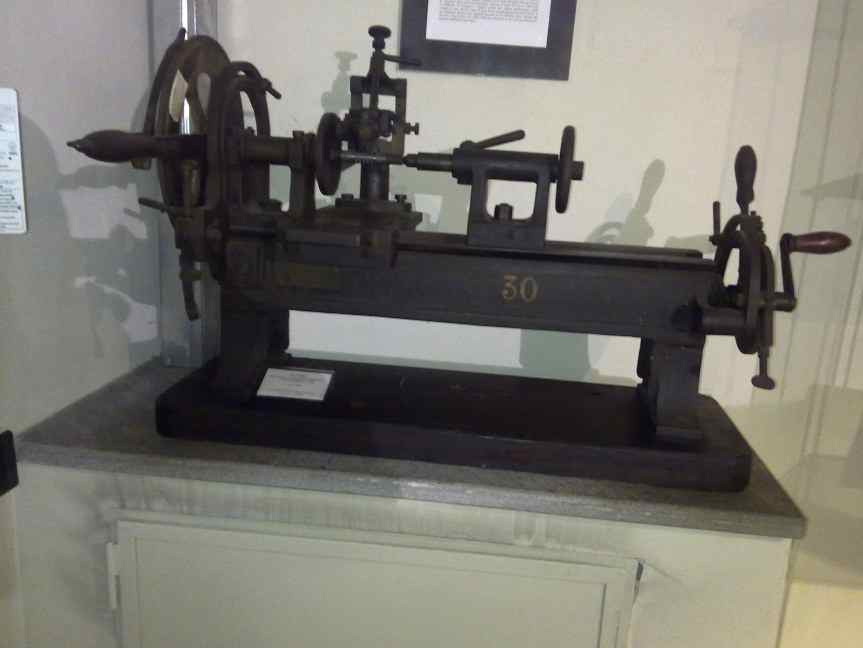
Machine that creates the cylinder design

== See also ==
- History of Busto Arsizio
- Monuments of Busto Arsizio

== Bibliography ==
- SCORAMUCCI, Museo del tessile e della tradizione industriale di Busto Arsizio, Busto Arsizio, 1997
