= Museum Het Leids Wevershuis =

Museum in Leiden, Netherlands

Het Leids Wevershuis
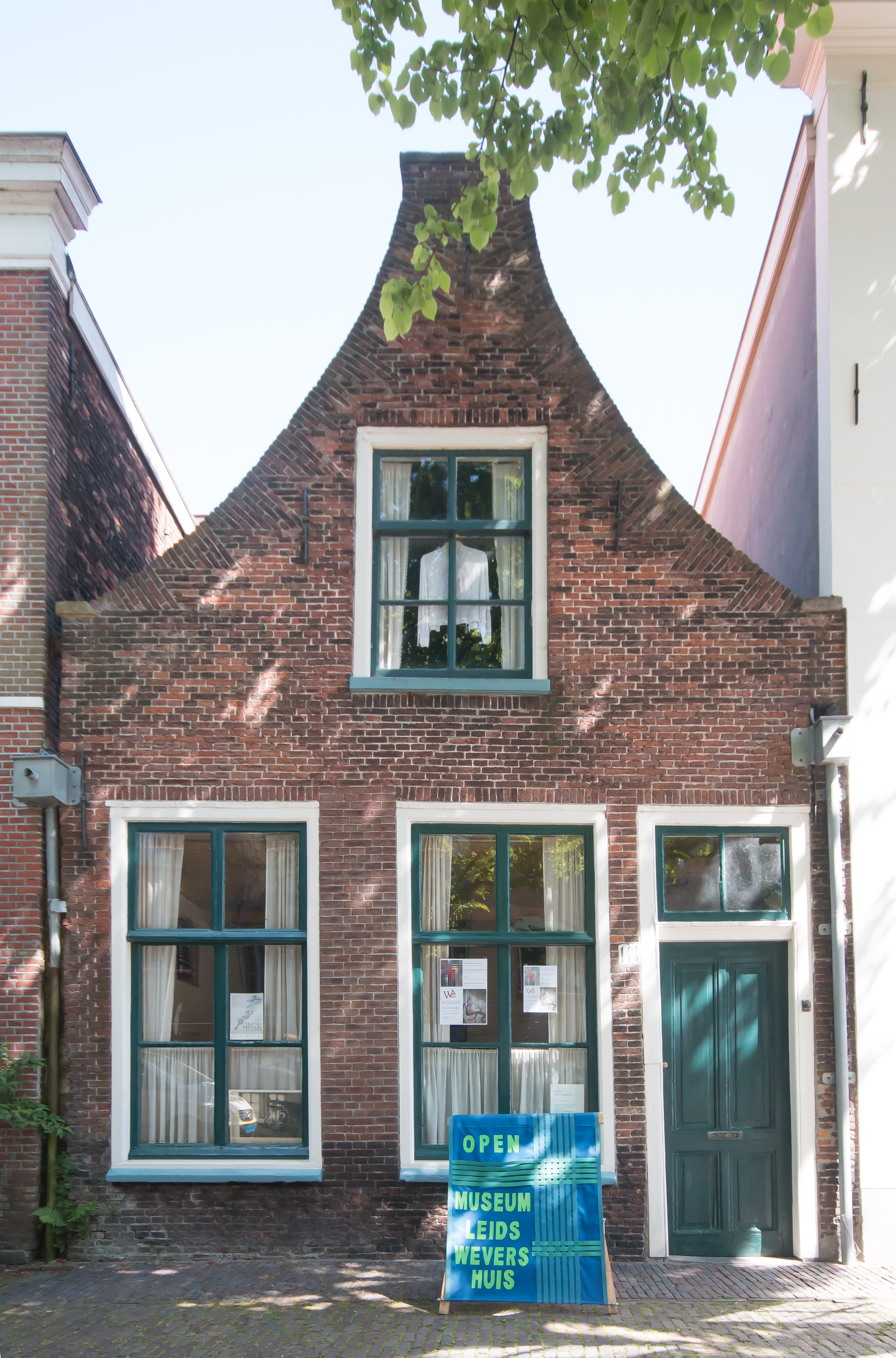
- Established: 2005
- Location: Middelstegracht 143
- Coordinates: 52.159949°N 4.498270°E
- Curator: Herbert van Hoogdalem
- Public transit access: From Leiden Central Station – Bus 5 or 6 to Leiderdorp – bus stop Hooigracht – Ir. Driessenstraat
- Website: wevershuis.nl/english/

Museum Het Leids Wevershuis consists of one of the last remaining "weavers' homes" in Leiden, Netherlands. Built around 1560, the exterior, the large antique loom (1830) and the interior, are testimony of the once flourishing textile industry (and trade) around Leiden, in particular during the 16th and 17th century, when many home weavers supplied the draper's guild with high quality woolen cloth.

== Museum ==
Ms. Jager, museum guide and weaver, demonstrates weaving with a historic loom at the museum

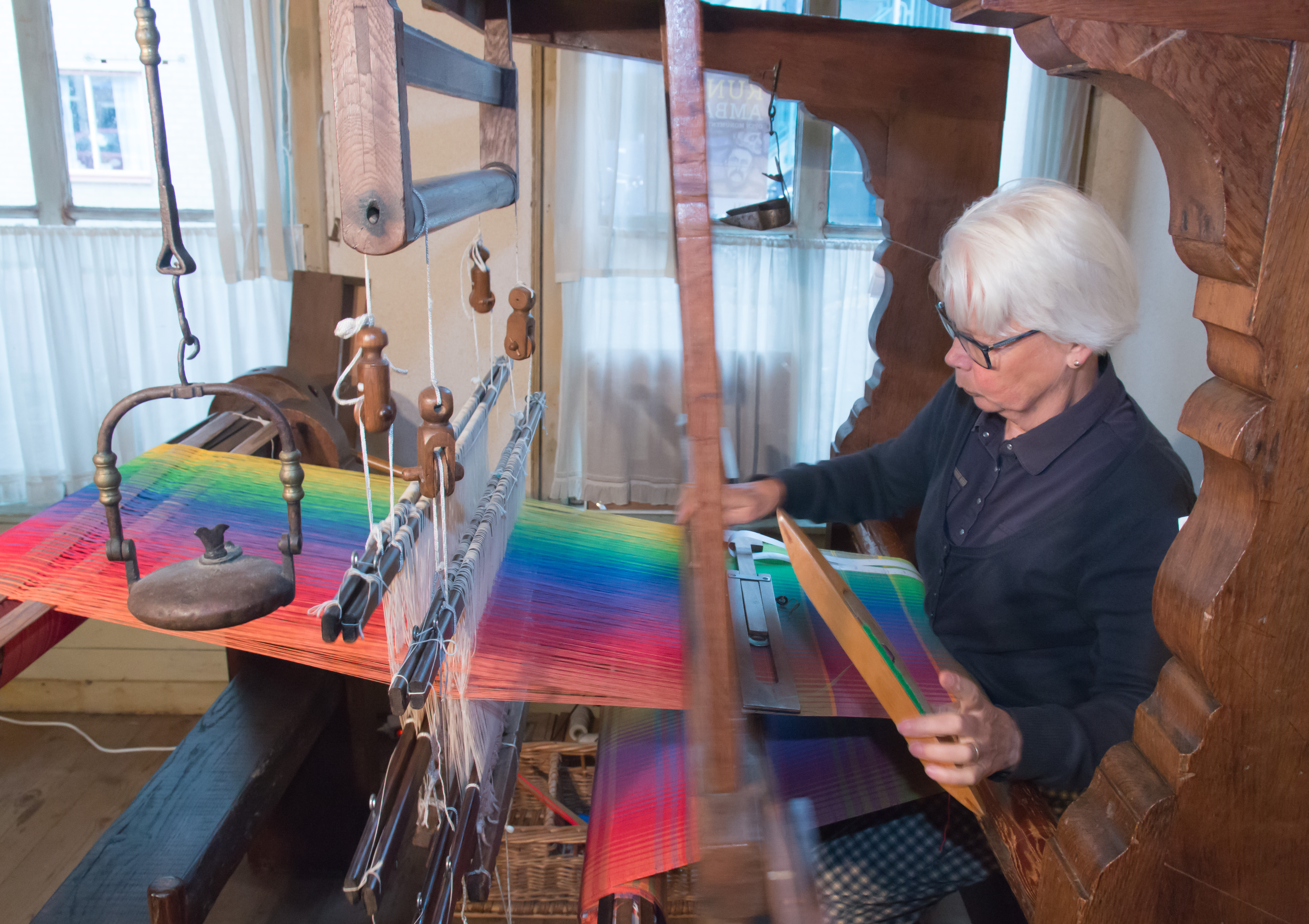
Museum guide and weaver Ms. Fennema demonstrates the loom. Here she battens the fabric (where the weft is pushed up against the fell of the cloth by the reed). In her left hand is the shuttle (which she will propel across the loom in an instant)

The building and its antique interior are the museum. There is a small collection of modern hand-woven textiles. The museum has a weaver available most days to demonstrate the craft on a large loom. Products made during demonstrations are for sale.

The museum is a short walking distance from the old Draper's guild, part of Museum De Lakenhal (Dutch for Cloth Hall) today.

== History of the building ==
Located on a spot which had always been used as a laborer's home, the house fell almost victim to a great plan to modernize the city in the 1960s (which never materialized due to opposition). It was never granted the rijksmonument status.

In the 1970s it attracted the attention of a small group of local historians and they formed Het Kleine Leidse Woonhuis in 1976 to save small old buildings in Leiden such as this one. The building was consolidated (not renovated) as a house in a neck-gable style around 1900. The mostly intact interior reflects living arrangements for workers in the early 20th-century in Leiden. An original cellar exists under the house and parts of the interior date back to the 17th-century.

Today it is part of a group of small houses in a neighborhood of mostly cement and modern brick constructions from the 1960s and 1970s.

== Occupants of the house, and their profession ==
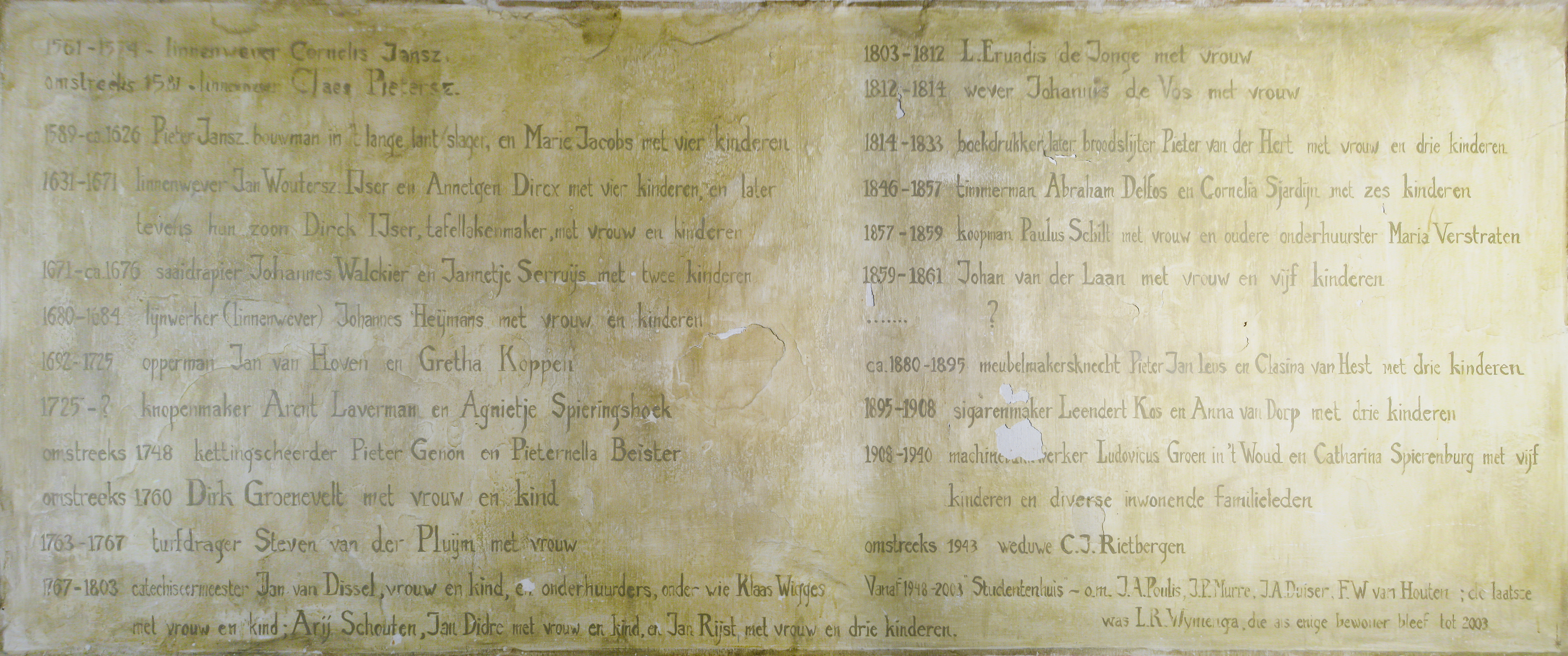
Social history of the house since 1561, written on the wall (216 x 90 cm)

An inscription in the narrow hallway of the house tells about the people who owned or rented the house, and their professions. Most dwellers worked in the textile industry.

== Gallery ==
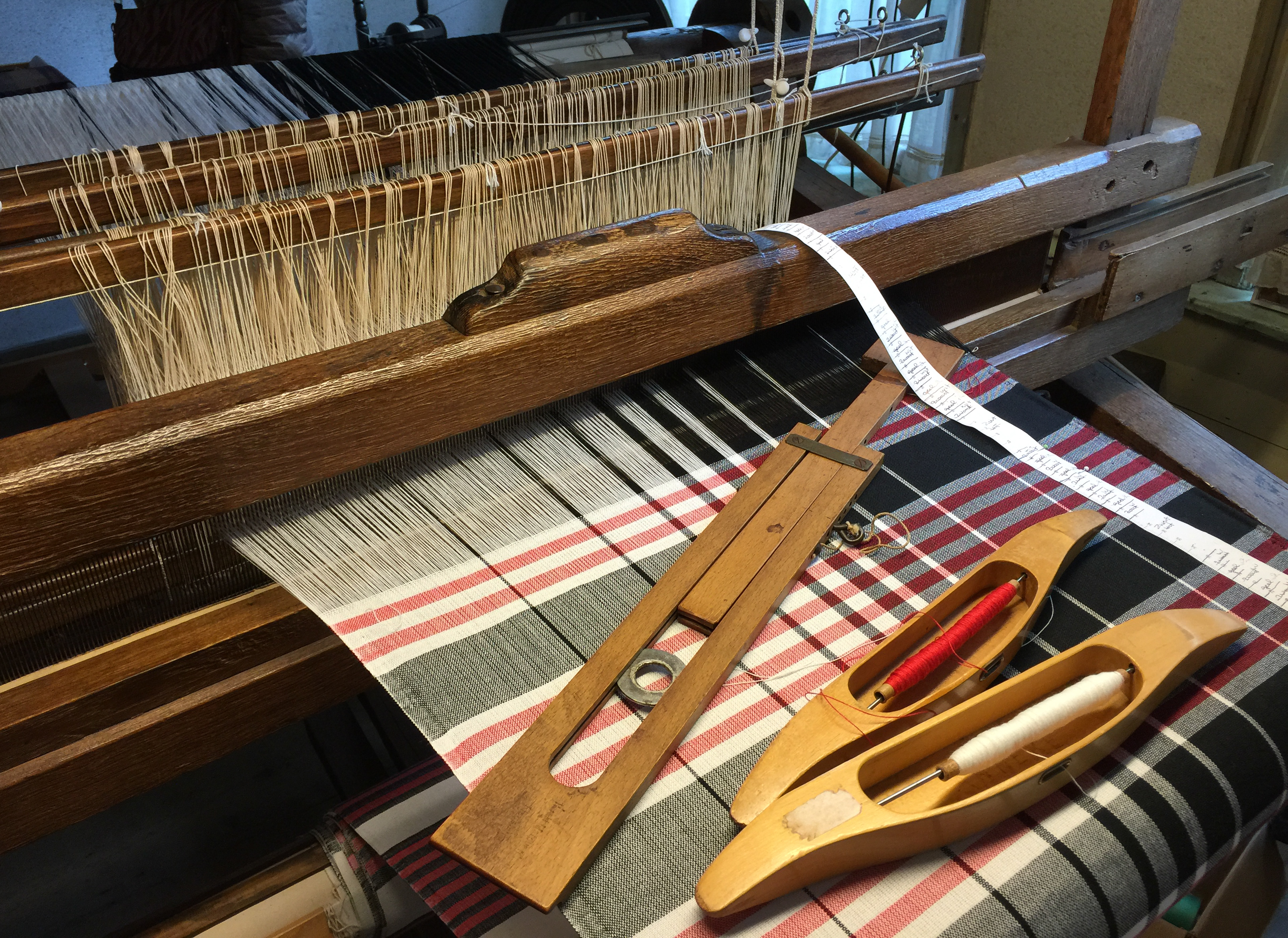
The antique loom (1830) which is still in daily use

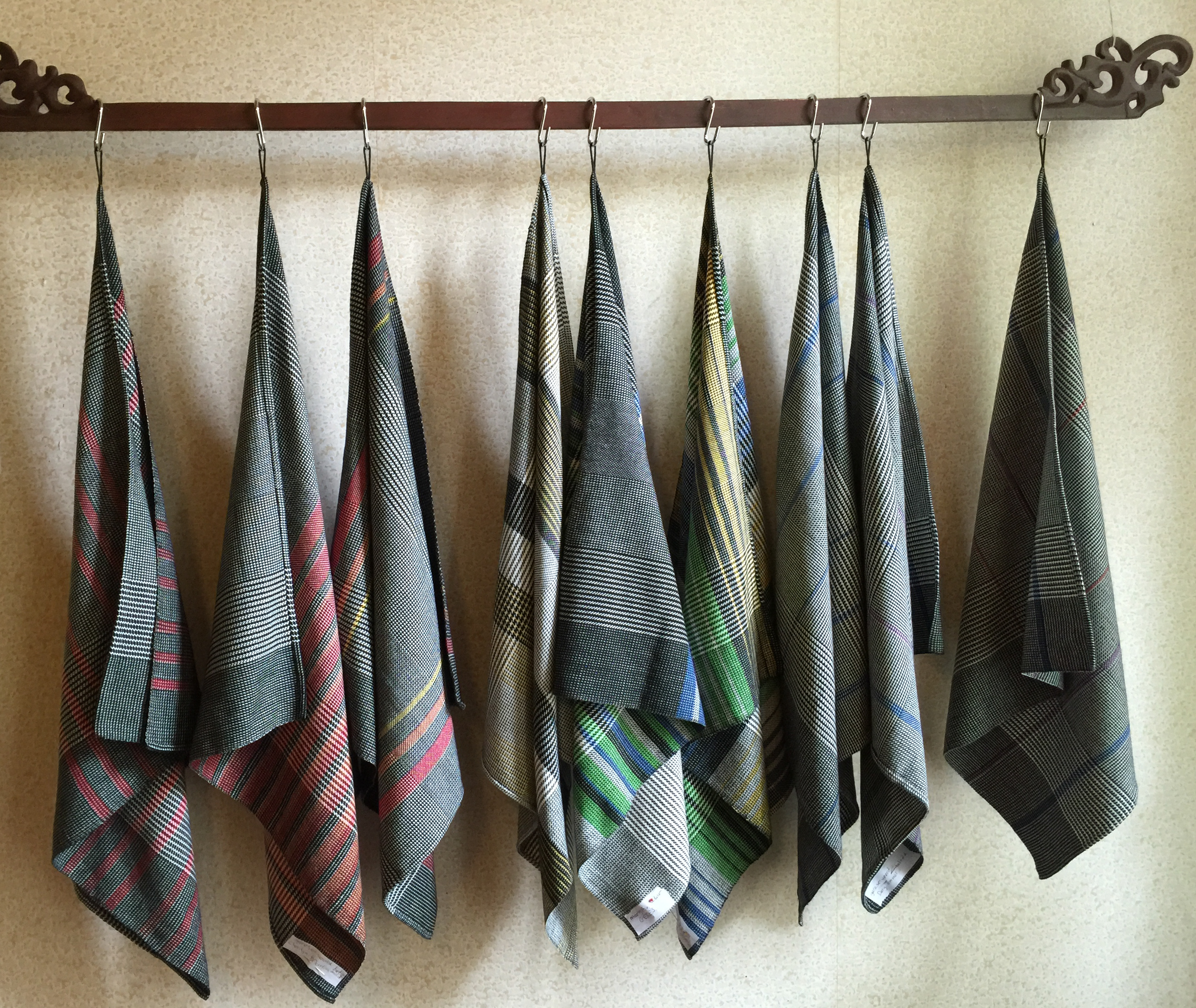
Dishcloths woven on the antique loom. Each cloth has a unique design, set by the weaver who completed the previous cloth.

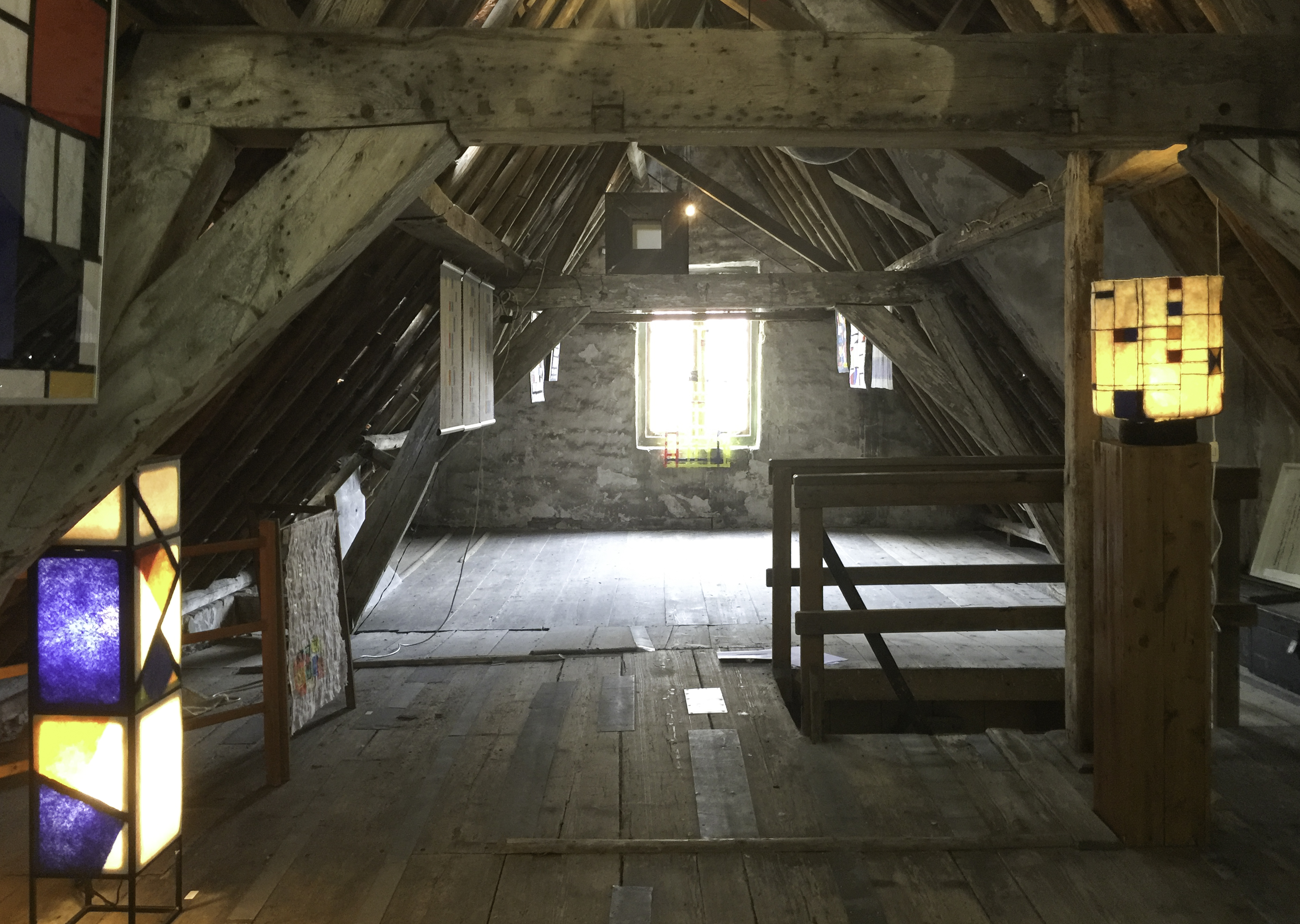
Changing exhibits, here 100 jaar De Stijl (2017)

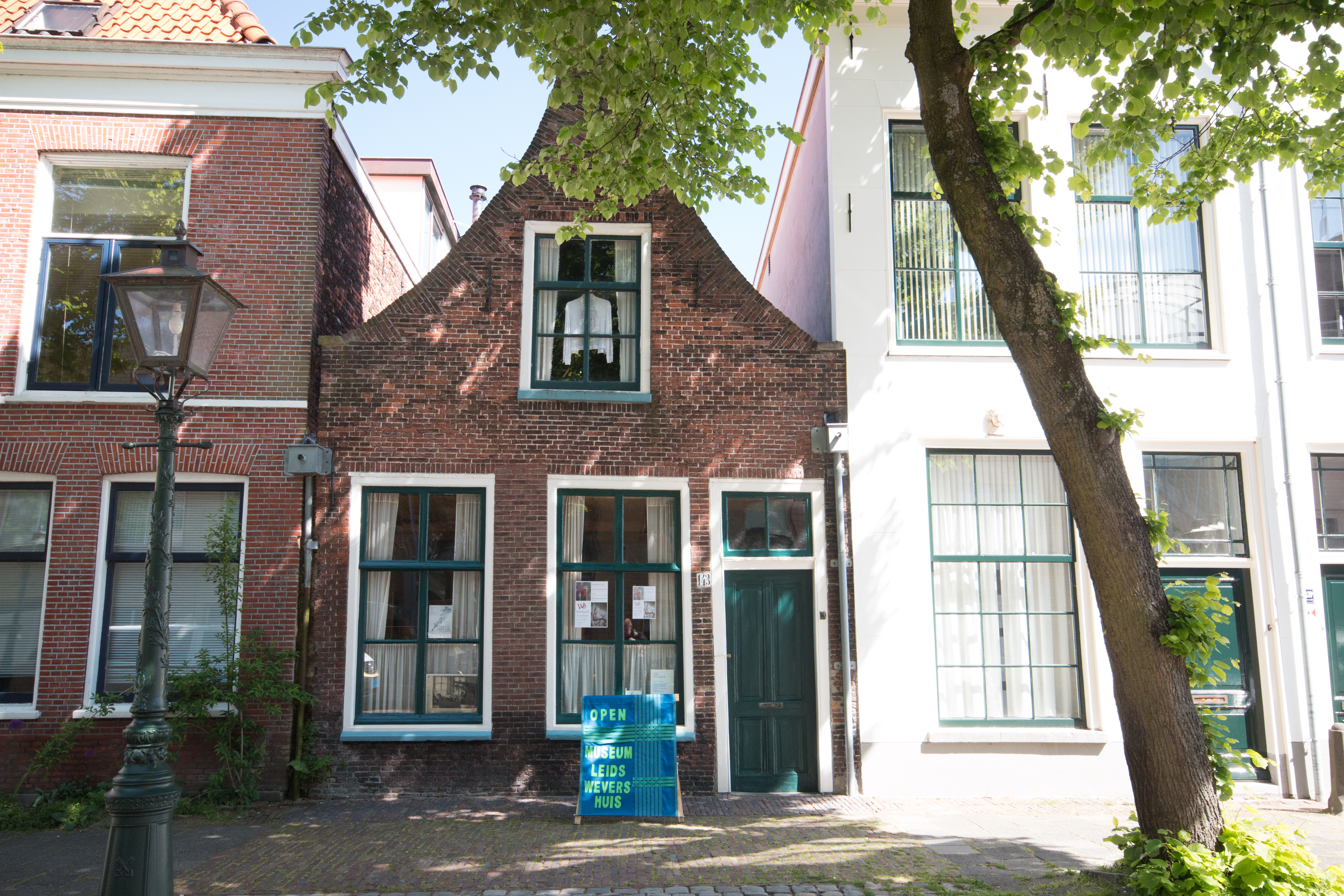
Facade

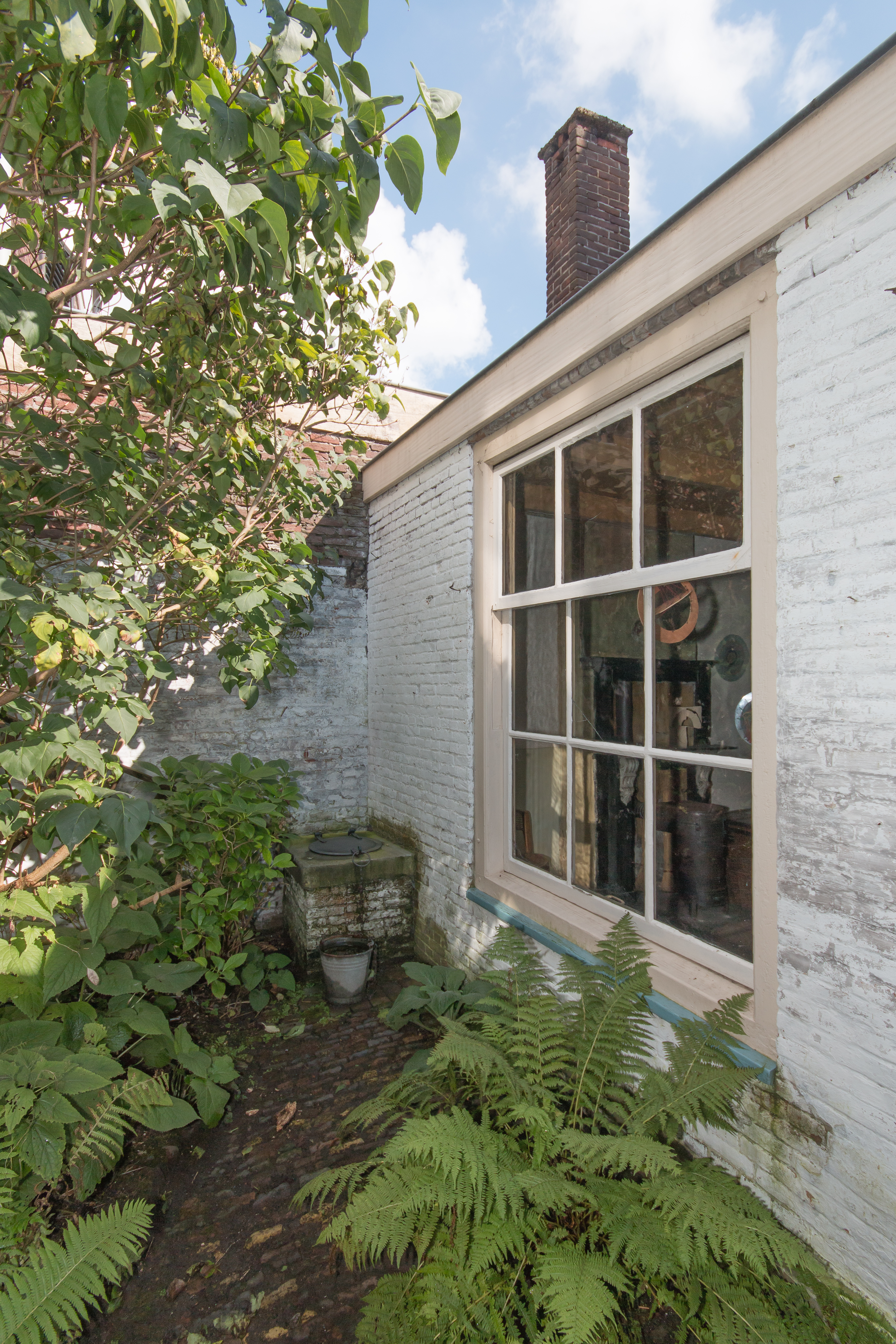
Back home with well

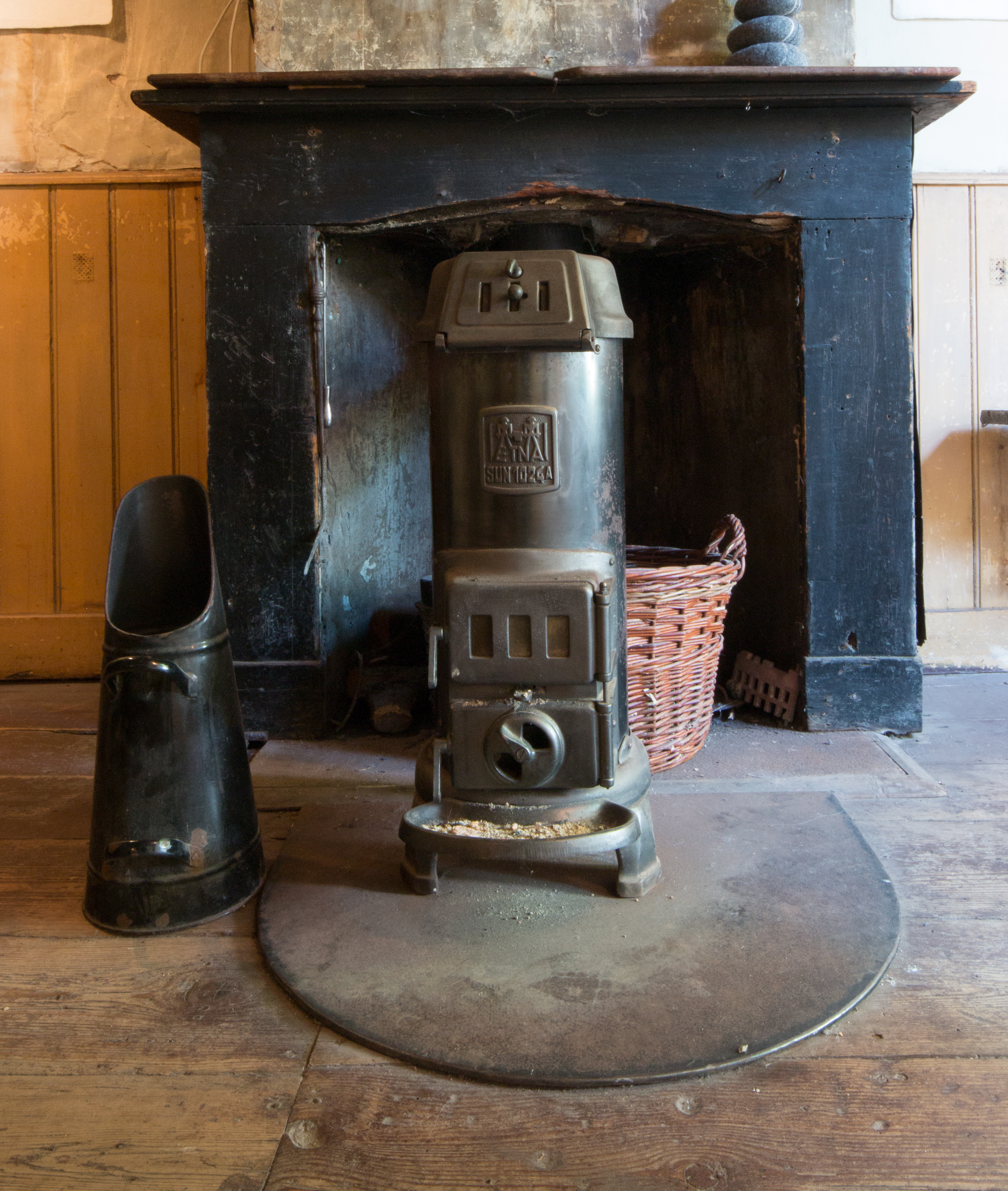
Heater

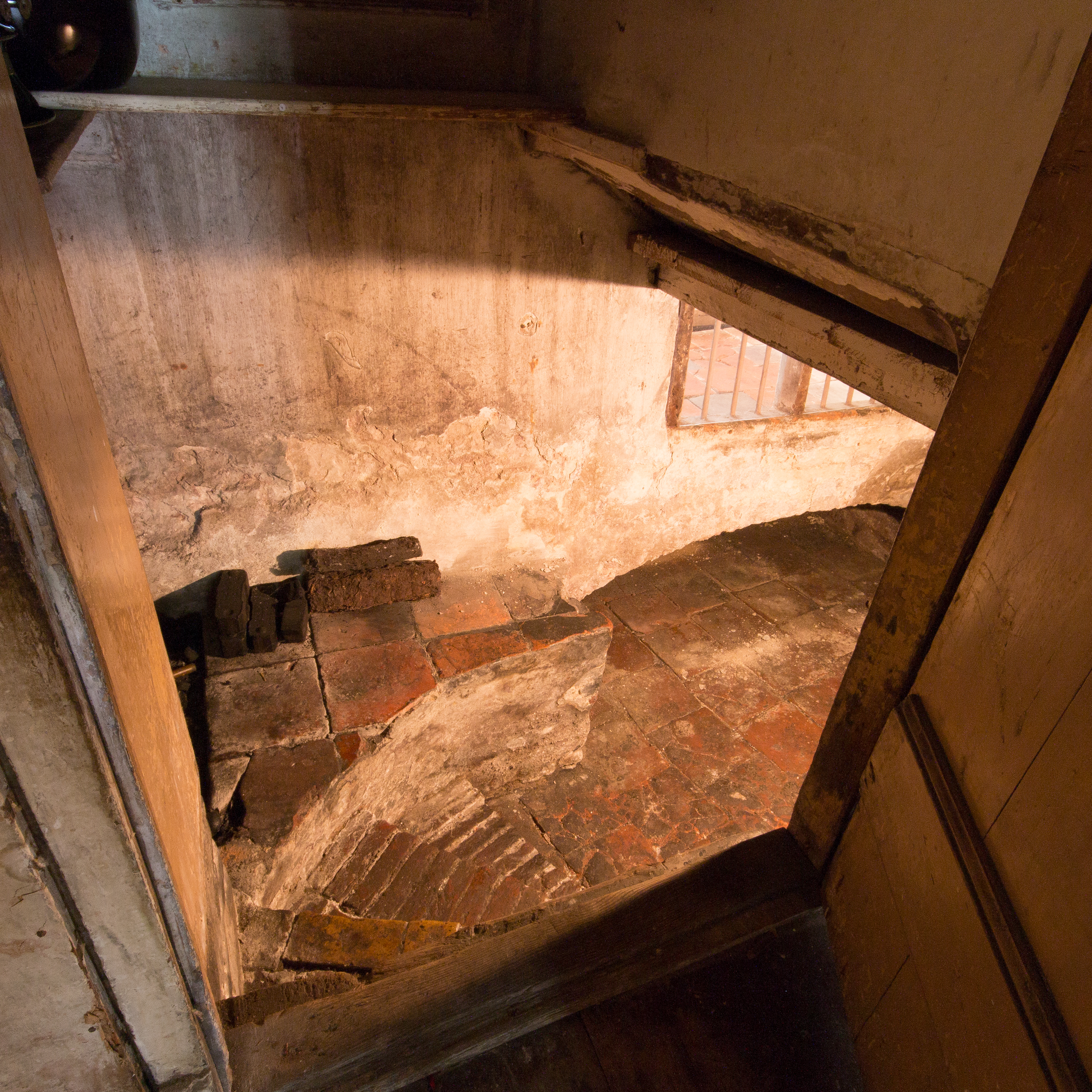
Steps towards very shallow basement (crawling space). Also dried peat for heater

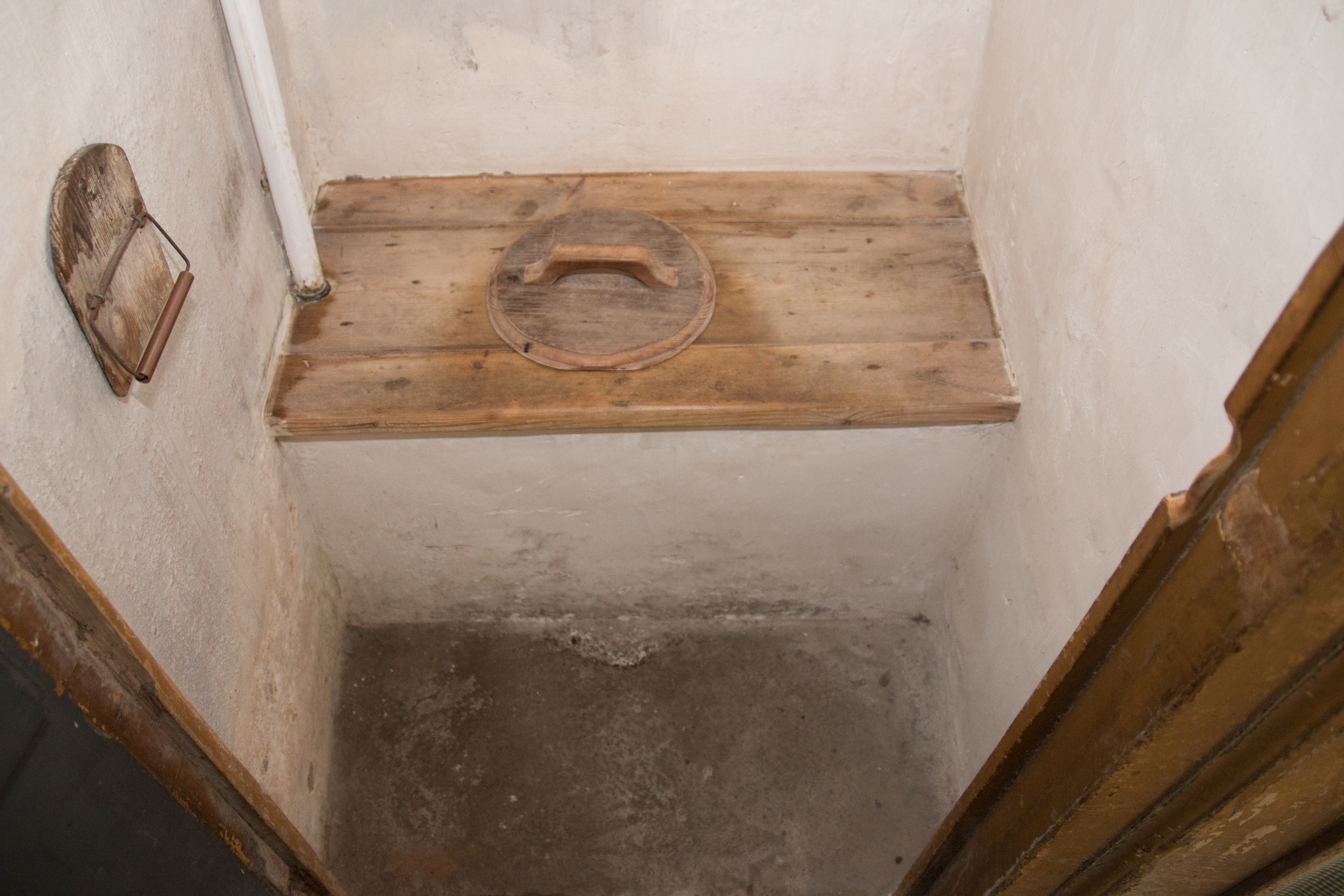
Toilet (modernized, originally just a ton)

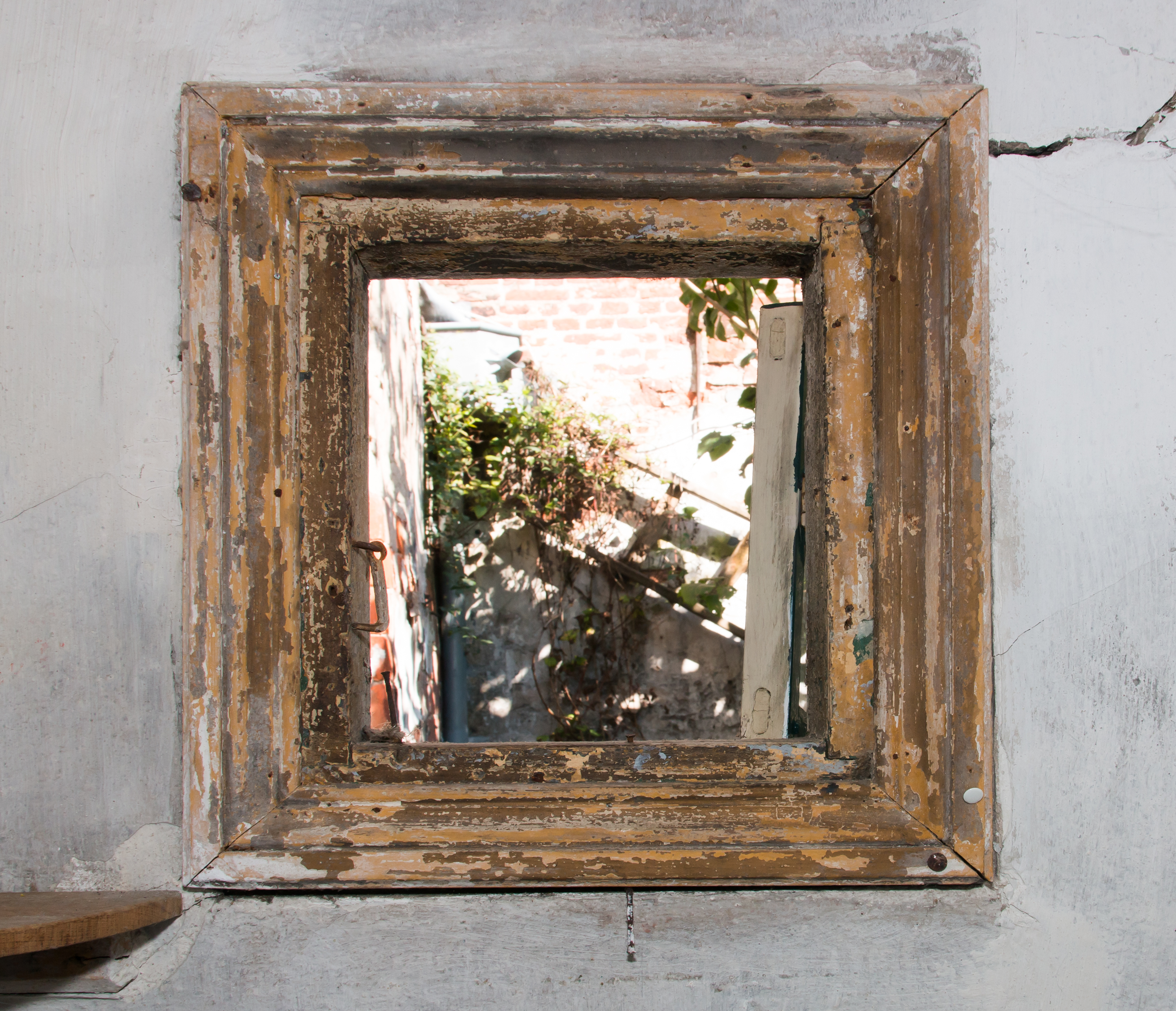
Most of the house is in the state after the last dweller left

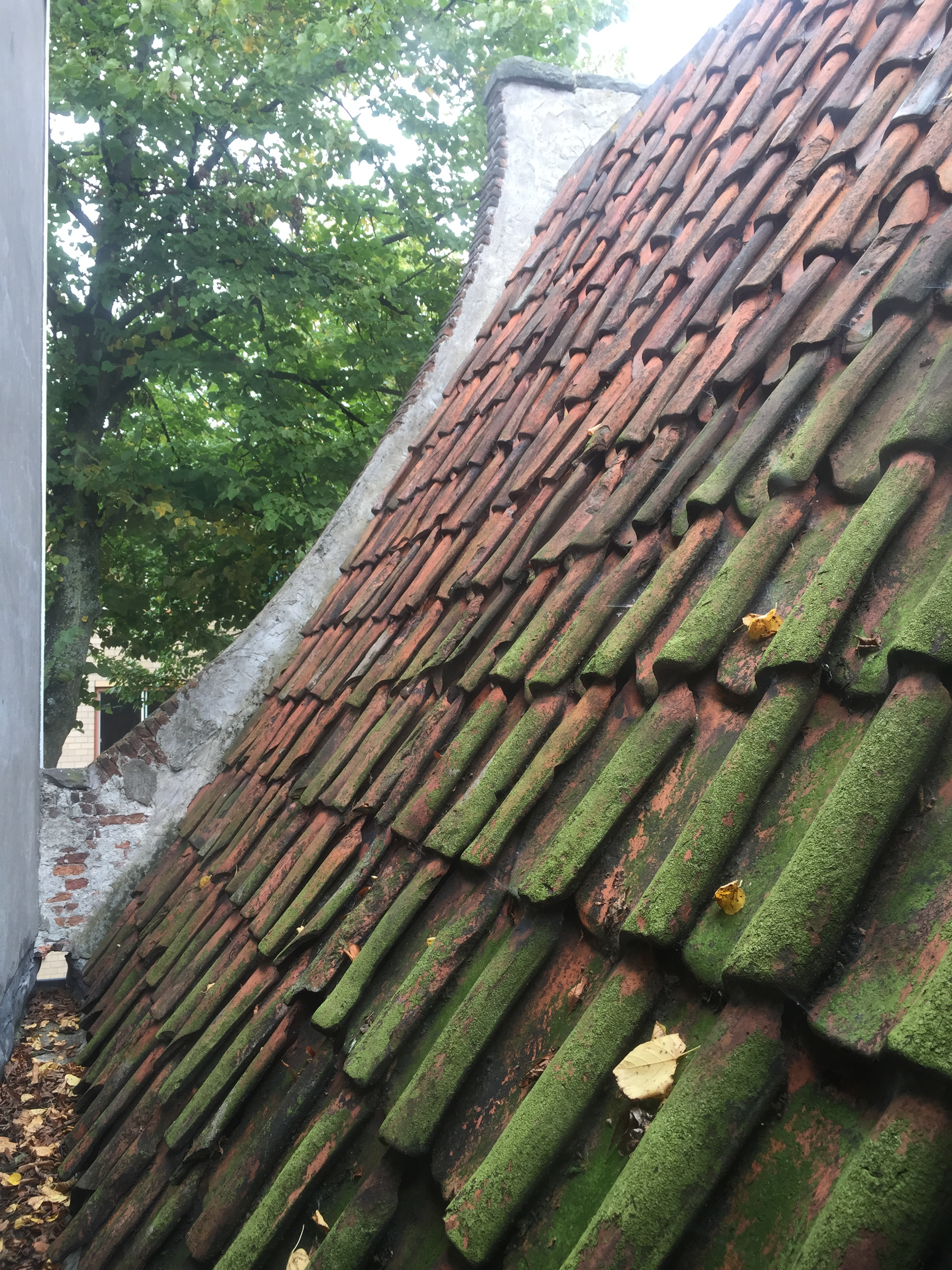
Roof, partly moss-clad, and top of facade

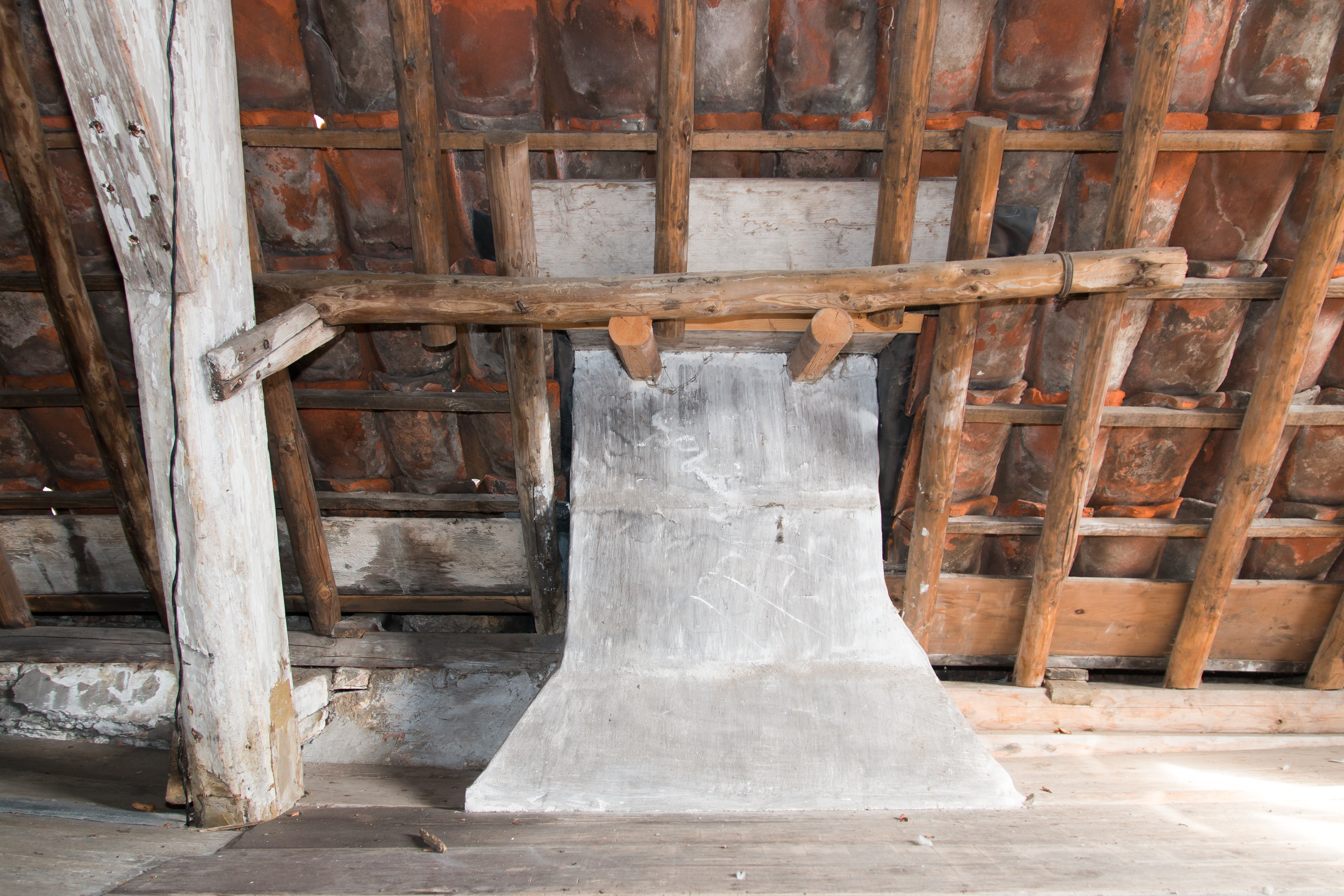
Roof and chimney

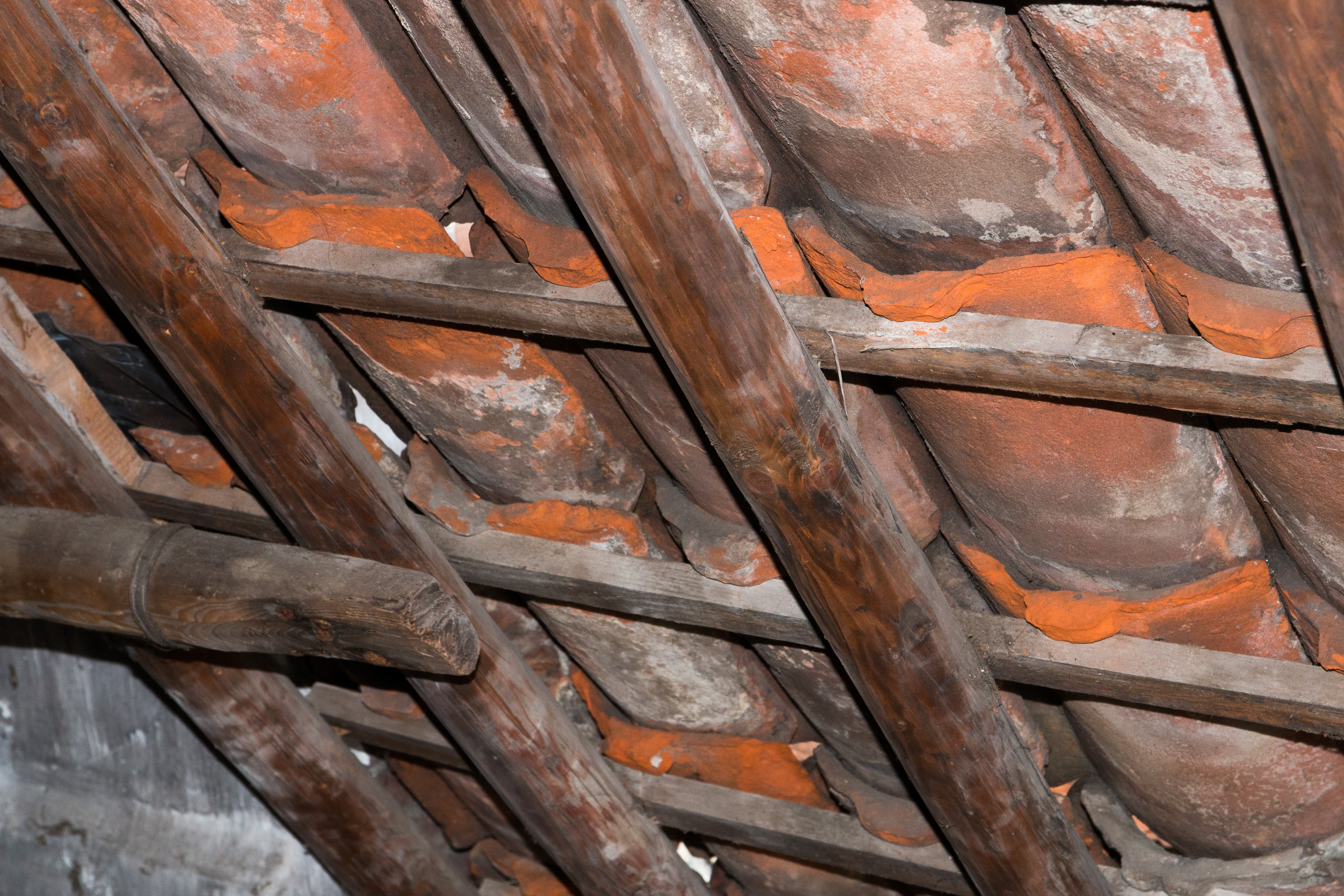
Roof tiles, note that all tiles are visible from within (Dutch:'onbeschoten dak')

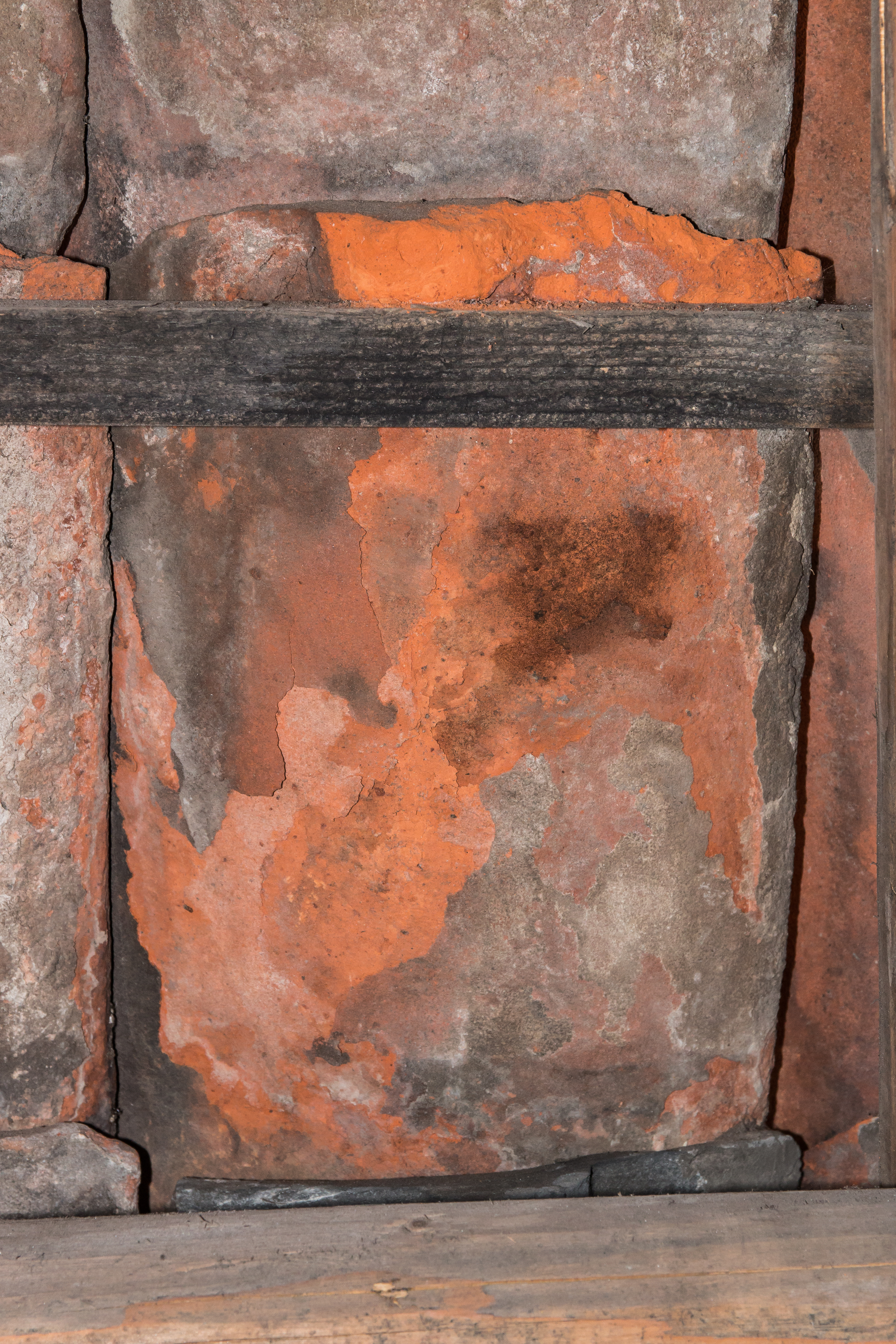
Roof tile (baked clay, weather-beaten)

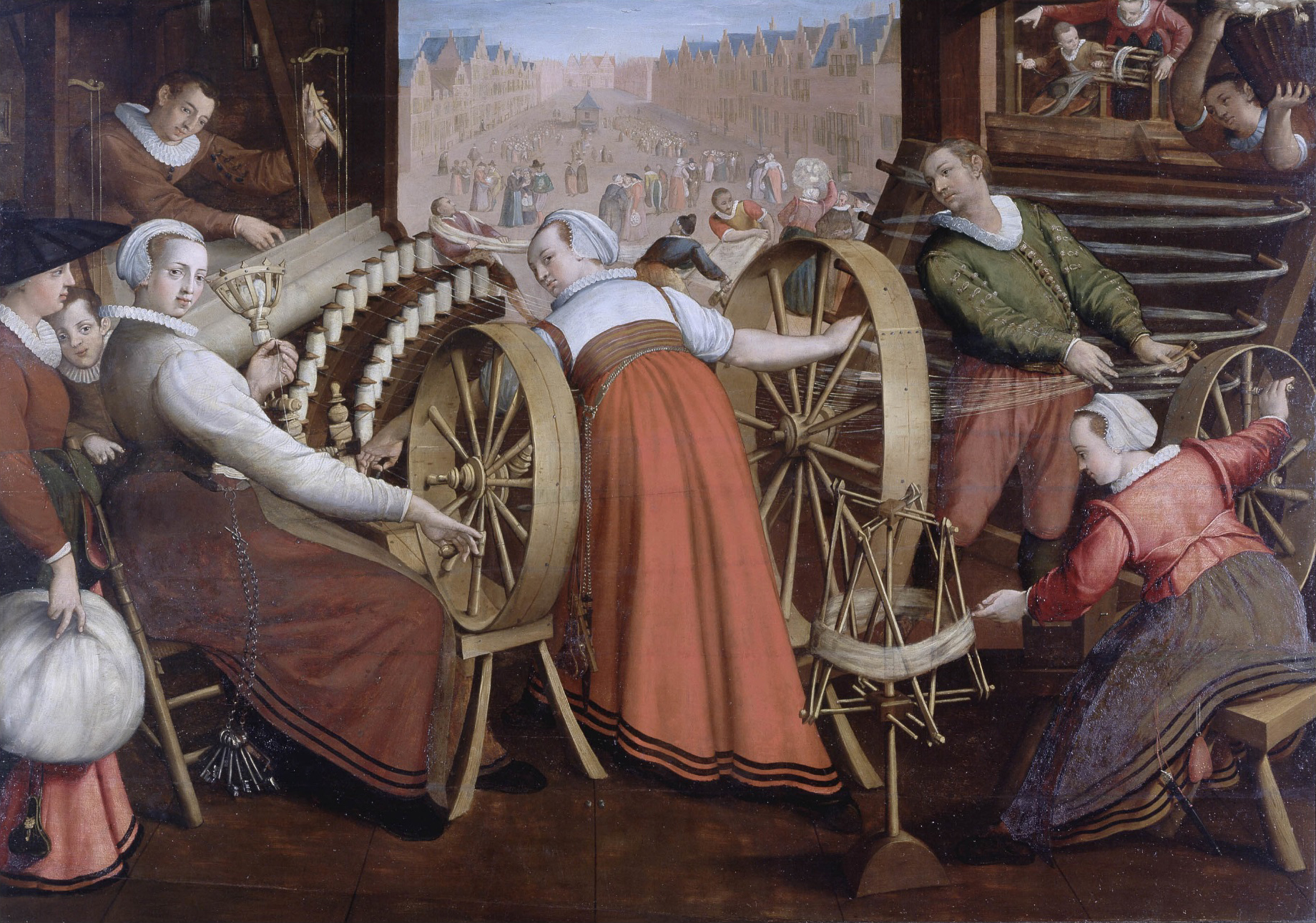
Spinning wool, a larger-than-life painting of the wool trade in Leiden with a view of two small workers' homes, 1595, by Isaac van Swanenburg
