= Moreno Gardens =

- I Giardini Monet
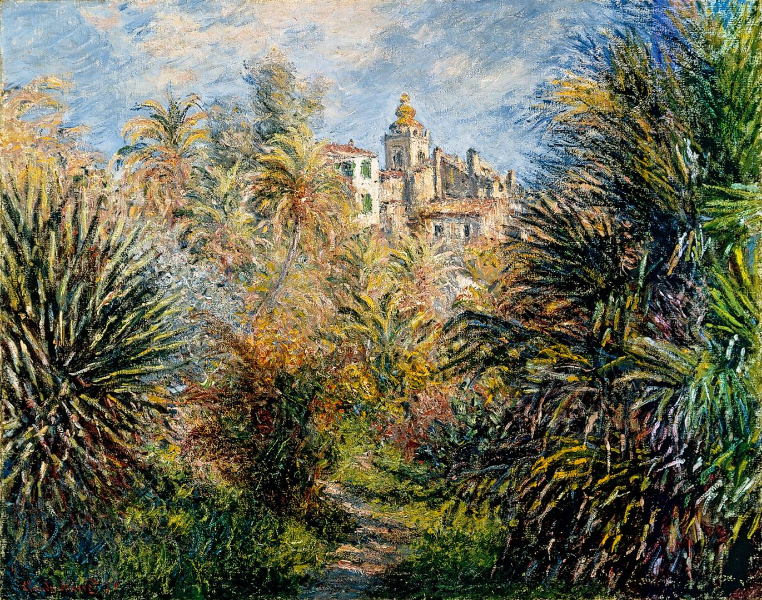
- Moreno Gardens by Claude Monet (1884)
- Interactive map of Moreno Gardens
- Location: via Domenico Tumiati
- Nearest city: Bordighera, Italy
- Created: Francesco Moreno
- Designation: Public gardens

The Moreno Gardens of Bordighera which were described by many tourists in the 19th century, no longer exist. Only a small portion survives as today’s Monet gardens, which are located in Via Domenico Tumiati, and in some private properties (Villa Schiva, Villa Palmizi, Villa Mariani, etc). The remainders of the Moreno Gardens and Villa Palmizi are part of the properties protected by the Superintendent of Ministry of Cultural Heritage and Activities and Tourism (Italy).

== History ==
The Moreno Gardens, quoted several times by the Charles Garnier, the painter Claude Monet and many other visitors to the city, were very large and rich in botanical varieties. The gardens started almost from the Via Aurelia, rose towards the Villa Moreno and came close to Via dei Colli. They were so impressive that many tourists asked to visit them. The '"Italia Geografica Illustrata" published in 1881, says "... the Moreno gardens are not only the most beautiful and most delightful location of the Mediterranean, but also one of the most beautiful and famous gardens of Europe." The extent of the park was impressive, it reached 80 hectares of green, to be compared with the current Gardens of Vatican City measuring 23 hectares.

Francesco Moreno, French consul in Bordighera, was a wealthy merchant of olive oil. He and his father Vincenzo built the house that bore their name, and filled the gardens of all the exotic varieties that they were able to import. The gardens, in addition to native plants such as lemons, mandarins, oranges, olive trees, were enriched with Pinus canariensis, Salisburia adiantifolia (Ginkgo biloba), Araucaria excelsa, Latania Bourbon, agave, aloe, yucca and a Coripha australis, synonymous with Livistona chinensis.

Upon the death of Francesco Moreno, in 1885, his wife moved to France to be reunited to the three daughters, who as a result of marriages had moved to Marseille. The villa, with its gardens, was sold to the municipality. The large gardens were divided up and sold. The municipality did prolong the via Romana, despite the opposition of numerous personalities including Ludwig Winter, and this resulted in the splitting of the prestigious gardens. Currently only a tiny portion still remains visible to the public, as the current Monet gardens in Via Domenico Tumiati. In this green area you can still admire a giant model of Cocculus Lurifolius.

Another small part of the original gardens was incorporated by two properties: Villa Palmizi (Via Romana 15), which retains the original core of the villa Moreno, and Villa Schiva (via Romana 17) where you can still admire the highest Pinus Canariensis of Europe. The tree, which was planted in 1830 is about 36 meters high. This magnificent monumental plant is still visible from the street. The tree was surveyed and is listed by the Corpo Forestale delle Stato. Noteworthy are also the Ginkgo biloba and Jubaea spectabilis, a slow-growing palm.

Other parts of the Moreno gardens are located in the villas built along the hillside. Villa Mariani preserves intact a portion of the ancient Moreno gardens, when visiting the villa one can still see the same olive tree painted by Claude Monet in "Study of olive trees" and the same view painted in "View of Ventimiglia".

The tree heritage of Bordighera was truly exceptional, in 1869 Gerolamo Molinari in his book "Cenni storici sulla Bordighera, suo territorio e clima" ("A brief history of Bordighera, its territory and its climate") estimated it at more than 100,000 plants including olive, citrus and palm trees. He wrote that only counting lemon and orange trees there were some 36,000 trees without counting the other citrus fruits. The palm trees that now adorn the famous "Promenade des Anglais" in Nice, as well as other walks along the French coast, are from Bordighera.

== Trivia ==
During his stay in Bordighera, the painter Claude Monet asked his friend Durand-Ruel to intercede for him, to get him permission to visit the Moreno gardens. Monet wrote: "Here lives a certain Mr. Moreno, who owns a wonderful property, but one cannot visit it without a recommendation. I would be very obliged if you could get me a permission to visit.” Monet got the permission and painted numerous paintings which now belong to private collections and museums. The most well-known are: "Bois d'oliviers au jardin Moreno" (1884), "Jardins de la Villa Moreno" (1884), "Jardins Moreno à Bordighera" (1884).

Photo gallery

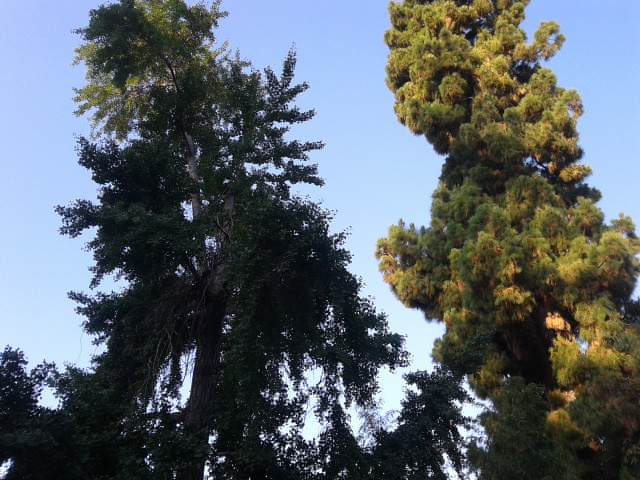
Ginkgo Biloba and Pinus canariensis

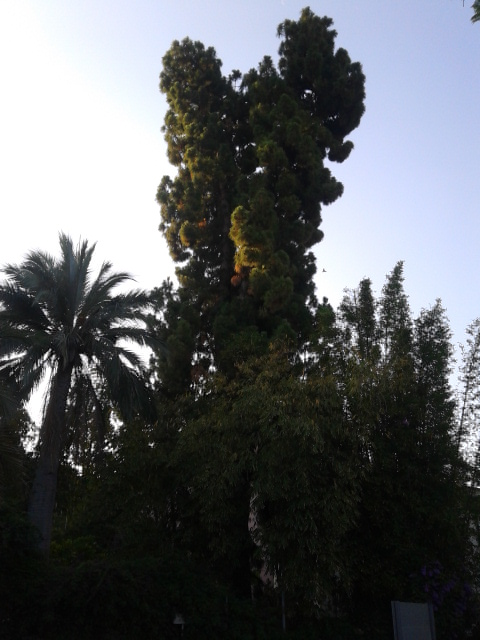
The highest Pinus Canariensis in Europe

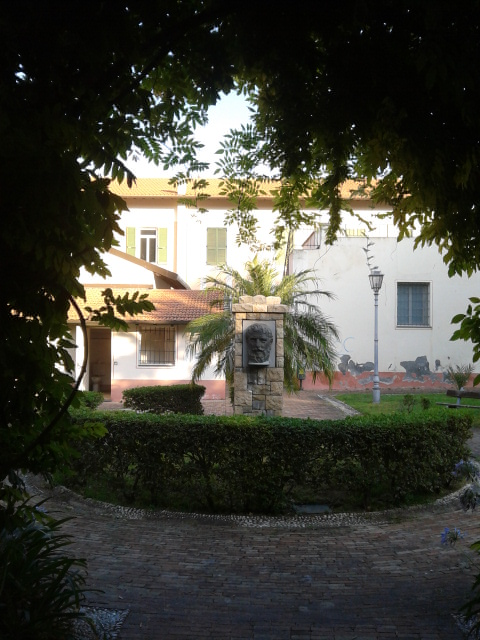
Bust of Claude Monet

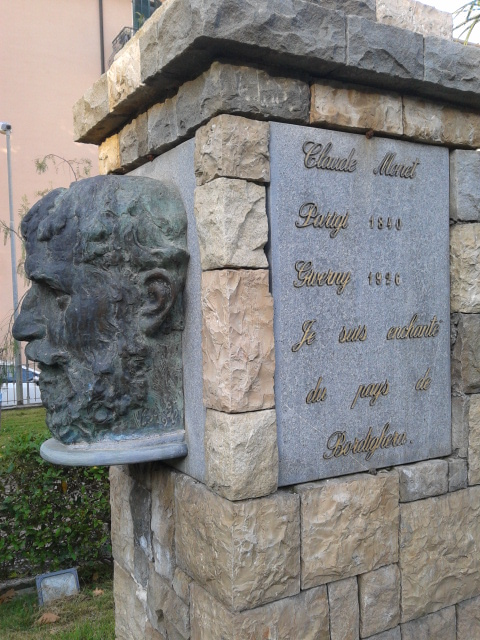
Bust of Monet and plate
