= Villa Mariani =

Building in Bordighera, Italy

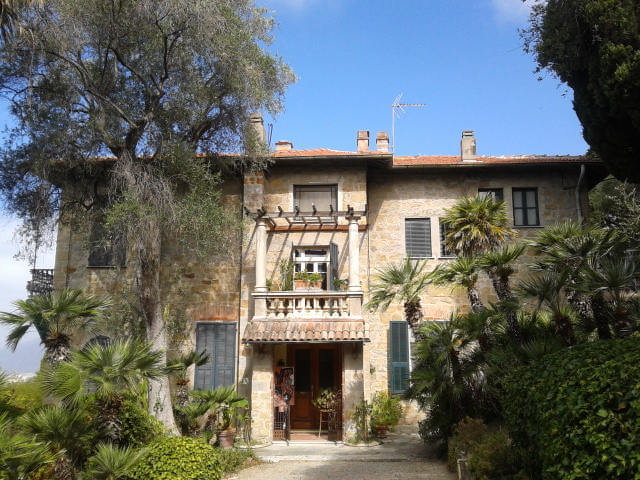
- Villa Pompeo Mariani.
- Interactive map of the Villa Mariani area

General information
- Location: Bordighera, Italy
- Construction started: ca. 1885
- Completed: ca. 1911
- Client: Pompeo Mariani

Design and construction
- Architect: Luigi Broggi
- Designations: Soprintendenze per i Beni Architettonici e Paesaggistici della Liguria

The Villa Mariani is located at 5 Via Fontana Vecchia in Bordighera on the Riviera in the province of Imperia, in northern Italy near the French border.

== History ==
The Villa Pompeo Mariani was born as a cottage. In 1885 the countess Fanshawe had asked the architect Charles Garnier to build a residence for her on the hill of Bordighera. At first it was a one-story cottage with basement, whose main room was lit by a large window that still exists.

Pompeo Mariani, a famous painter of the time and nephew of the famous Mosè Bianchi, bought the property in 1909 and asked the architects Luigi Broggi and Angelo Savoldi (architect) to expand the building. During this first extension, they added a floor to the villa, realized wooden balconies on the north-west wing and a balcony above the main entrance, supported by Doric columns. This expansion saw the collaboration of numerous nationally known craftsmen such as the cabinet-maker Eugenio Quarti, who created much furniture, the bronze worker Giovanni Lomazzi, who took charge of the brass, and Alessandro Mazzucotelli (it), who made the iron decorations. A particularly valuable addition to the gate entrance, near the street lights that decorate the garden, is the writing on Mariani's bedroom balcony which reads "Ave Mariani pictor very famous and to Lisander Ferree", still visible on the side south of the villa.

The second extension dates from 1914 and was given to the architect and friend Rodolfo Winter, son of the botanist Ludwig Winter. On this occasion the north-western wing was extended, the balconies were closed and a terrace built to admire the lower city, the sea and the French coast. The villa then reached an area of 600 square meters (6,500 sq ft). The interior, which can still be visited, has not only maintained its original furnishings, but also many personal items of Mariani such as clothes, hats, walking sticks, etc. The lounge, which thanks to Winter's expansion, reached 90 m^{2} (970 sq ft), still retains a belief in oak paneling built by Eugenio Quarter. On a piece of furniture there is a clock given by Arturo Toscanini, depicting a scene from the Turandot of Giacomo Puccini, and a friend of the two artists. A trivia is that Turandot, Puccini's unfinished work, was eventually completed by Franco Alfano, who stayed in Bordighera in 1926, in the Villa of the Waves, as he composed the work "Madonna Imperia".

In the dining room there is a brass glass case by Giovanni Lomazzi, created for the Exposition Universelle (1889) in Paris, which earned him an honorable mention. On the first floor, there is the bedroom which has remained miraculously intact. Above the bed are the message boards, made by Eugenio Quarter, where Mariani always kept the paper sheets on which to sketch something. On the shelf of toiletries, there are his razor and his talcum powder.

The Villa's Park, appliances and all the contents of the property are protected by the Ligurian Superintendence for Architectural Heritage and Landscape.

== The workshop ==
The artist's workshop, La Specola, is located in the garden of the villa and was built by the architect Rodolfo Winter in 1911. The origin of the name is uncertain. It could come from the Latin specula, which means observing. Mariani wanted a large studio to work comfortably and to gather his art collections (carpets, porcelain, ancient weapons etc.). Many construction techniques modern for the times were used. Very deep foundations were dug to withstand the upper floors, which were then built in 1925 when a new building hid the beautiful view of the atelier.

The workshop was wide, about 250 m^{2} (2,700 sq ft), and equipped with large windows and skylights that allowed light to penetrate it. The main entrance is dominated by metalwork and a canopy of wrought iron with floral motifs by Alessandro Mazzucotelli. On the left, on the corner of the building, there is a pinnacle of Milan Cathedral and, on the right, a bas-relief as representing Mariani's wife, Marcellina Caronni, made by Paul Troubetzkoy. In the entrance, the atrium is dominated by a bookcase/desk, made by Eugenio Quarter, framing a window. The lobby and the studio are separated by a glass and a wooden wall by Eugenio Quarti. The room, very large, has a sort of apse at the bottom, with a fireplace of the '700. Above the entrance, there is a loft from which one could view both the artist at work and his works. The place is packed with personal belongings of the artist, which also came from his other workshops in 1914, when he retired to Bordighera. There are also the coffers of biennials in which he participated, catalogs of his showings, etc. Particularly original is a box/palette that he used when travelling.

On Mariani's death, the property passed to Mary, daughter of Marcellina Caronni, whom he had adopted and then to his grandson, the notary Pompeo Lomazzi. In 1998 the last descendant of Pompeo Mariani, Stefania Scevka, sister of the wife of Pompeo Lomazzi, decided to sell the house to an admirer of Mariani's work, Carlo Bagnasco. After a complete renovation, which lasted two years realized in collaboration with the Superintendency for Architectural Heritage of Liguria, "La Specola" returned to its former glory. The objects patiently gathered by Carlo Bagnasco, based on a careful study of old photographs, were returned to their place of origin.

Today “la Specola” is the official home of the "Foundation Pompeo Mariani" and permanent home of an exhibition dedicated to the works of Mariani, but also to those of his uncle Mosè Bianchi, and also of some other artists like Giuseppe Allosia, Arnaldo Esposto and Giannetto Fieschi. Since 2008, Villa Mariani is part of the Italian Historic Houses, and is one of some 200 painter's workshops of the ‘800 and ‘900 which can still be visited in the world.

== The gardens ==
The gardens of the villa, which are developed on a portion of the old Moreno Gardens, have an area of about one hectare and, as often happens in Bordighera, can boast centuries-old trees. Still today you can admire palms, soles of oranges, tangerines, lemons and of course numerous olive trees, many of which are between 200 and 400 years. Near La Specola there are two olive trees which, according to the State Forestry Department, are older than 500 years. All the olive trees in the garden of the villa belong to the taggiasca variety, which has a very slow growth. It is impressive to note that you can still recognize the olive trees painted by Claude Monet in his painting "Study of olive trees", now in a private collection. Spots used by Monet are marked with panels in which are copies of his paintings. In the garden there is also a fountain with a mask of the 15th century from Tuscany.

Since 2008 the gardens are part of the "Great Italian Gardens". The Liguria region also selected it as one of the 26 most beautiful gardens in the region.

== Trivia ==
Claude Monet visited the Moreno Gardens in 1884, and some of his paintings were painted right in the area that today corresponds to the garden of Villa Mariani. In a letter dated February 5, 1884 Monet wrote: "... a garden like this is indescribable, it is pure magic, all plants in the world grow there in the land and not appear cured, there is a tangle of palm trees of every variety, all kinds of oranges and tangerines ... "

One day Queen Margaret of Italy came to the villa unannounced to congratulate the artist for his portrait of King Umberto. Mariani who was painting, took a few minutes to get in order before meeting the queen. When he showed up at the door of La Specola it appears that the queen was already waiting for ten minutes. The meeting went well and Mariani took advantage of the moment to make a quick portrait of the queen. Since then, Mariani was kindly nicknamed "the painter who made the queen wait". The portraits made by Mariani are still preserved at the International Institute of Ligurian Studies.

== Photo gallery ==
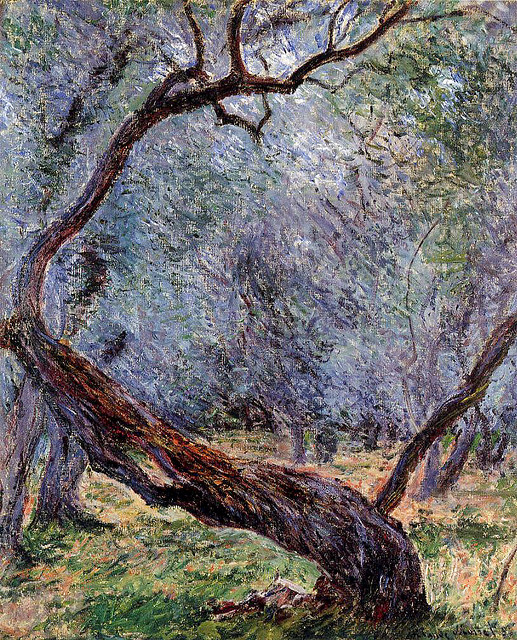
"Studio di ulivi" Claude Monet, 1884. The olive trees are still present in the Garden of Villa Mariani.

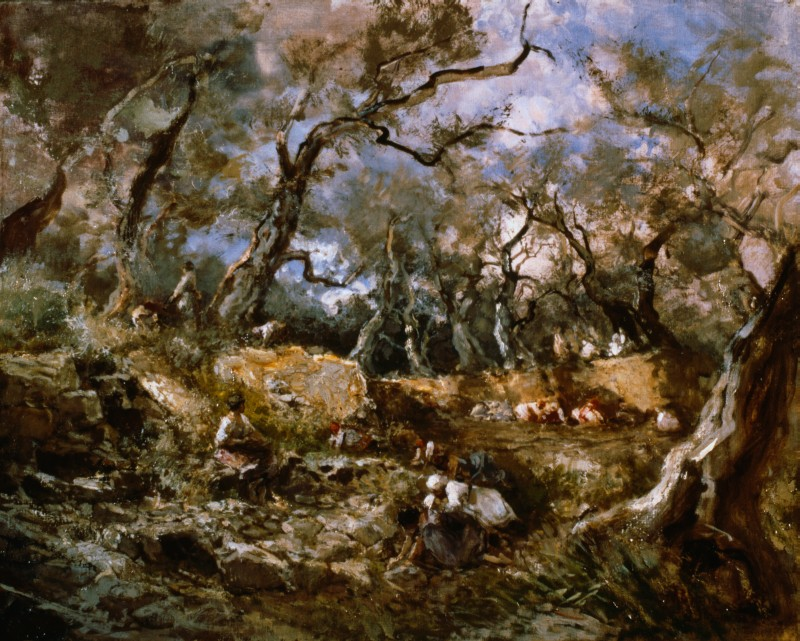
The olive harvest in Bordighera , Pompeo Mariani, 1917.

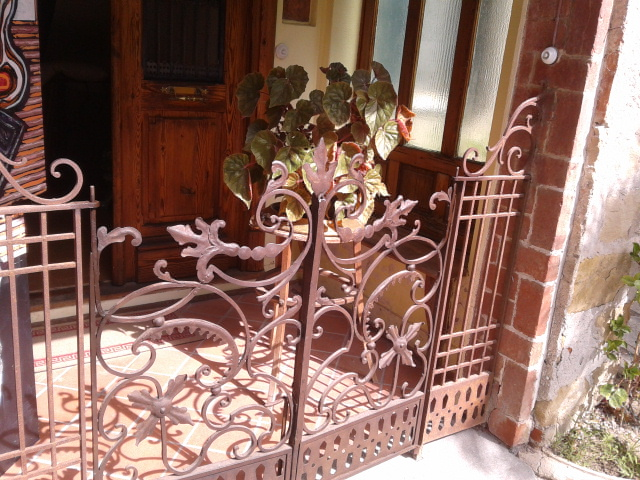
Gate of Mazzucotelli, Villa Mariani.

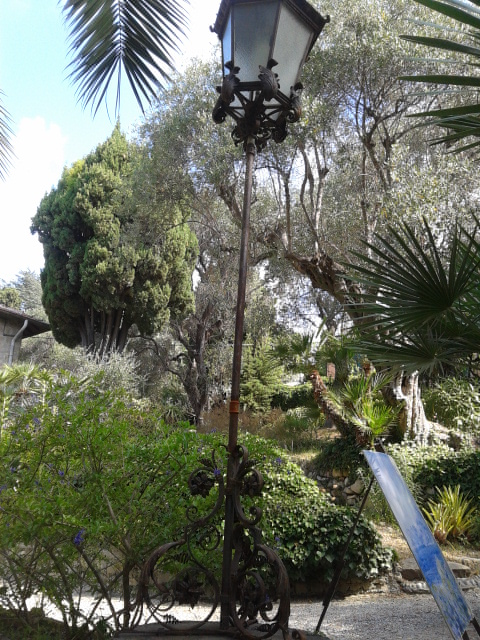
Street-Lamp of Mazzucotelli, Villa Mariani.

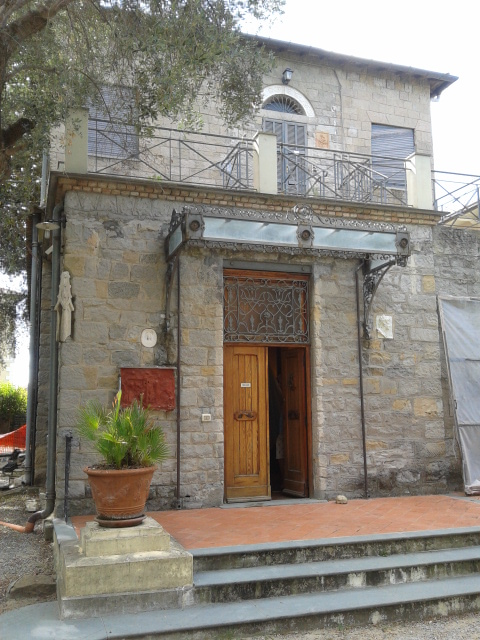
Facade of Specola, Villa Mariani.

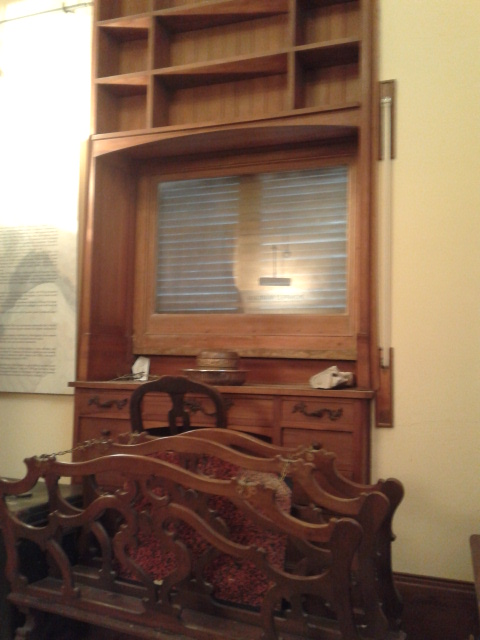
Specola library built by Eugenio Quarti.

== Bibliography ==
- Villa pittore Mariani di P. Mastorakis ISBN 978-88-6462-315-3
- Parole a colori di Silvia Alborno ISBN 978-88-88591-00-1

== See also ==
- Pompeo Mariani
- Mosè Bianchi
- Impressionism
