= Eugenio Quarti =

Italian furniture maker

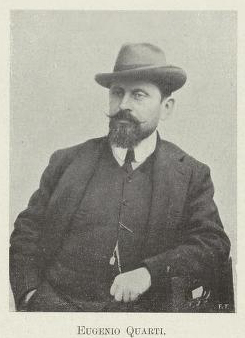
- Quarti in 1906
- Born: Eugenio Quarti; 1867; Villa d'Almè, Italy
- Died: 1926 (aged 58–59); Milan, Italy
- Occupations: Ébéniste, Designer

Eugenio Quarti (1867–1929) was an Italian furniture maker.

== Biography ==
Eugenio Quarti was born in Villa d'Almè, a small village in the province of Bergamo, from an artisan family of woodworkers. In 1881, at the age of 14 years old he travelled to Paris, where he learned new techniques and broadened his horizons. In 1886, he returned to Italy and settled in Milan where he worked, for a short period, with Carlo Bugatti and then opened his own workshop at via Donizetti 3.

His early works are strongly marked by Bugatti's Moorish style, but already at the exhibition of Turin of 1898 one can see the first signs of Art Nouveau and his personal style. He was always attentive to the quality and originality of his accomplishments, always attentive to every art form. Furniture realized mainly in walnut with inlays of nacre and metallic applications. Develop over time a harmonic elegance of the decor, with thread-like grounds, valuable wood species and inlays and high quality bezels with fine materials (nacre, silver, copper, bronze, pewter, etc.), this characteristic was called "the goldsmith of furniture makers."

In 1900 he participated at the Paris International Exposition where he received the "Grand Prix" of the jury. He was to participate in a number of other exhibitions including those of Turin in 1902 and Milan in 1906 where he received the "Grand Royal Award" and the "Diploma of gold medal".

Eugenio Quarti worked with the most prestigious architects of his time (Giuseppe Sommaruga, Luigi Broggi, Alfredo Campanini, etc.) well as with the great artists/craftsmen of his time as Alessandro Mazzucotelli. He also worked as a decorator, designing entire furniture for both public and private buildings. It was he who designed the furniture for Palazzo Castiglioni in Milan, Villa Carosio in Baveno, Grand Hotel and Casino in San Pellegrino Terme, Hungaria Palace Hotel in Venice Lido. One of his most significant works were the vessels of the "Bar Camparino", at the entrance site of the Galleria Vittorio Emanuele in Milan. however not disdain also committed less important such as the furniture for Villa Mariani to Bordighera residence of the painter Pompeo Mariani. To its activities before cabinetmaker, decorator and then also join a teaching and become Director of applied art workshop for timber, the Company Umanitaria. He was, without doubt, one of the great Italian cabinetmakers of the twentieth century, and some of his furniture is exhibited in various museums around the world, including the Museum of Decorative Arts of Castello Sforzesco in Milan, the Orsay Museum of Parigi, the Wolfsonian Museum Miami, etc. At his death in 1929, his son Mario Quarti (1901–1974) inherits his father's business, restructuring it and over the years thirty the "Quarter - furniture art", located in Via Palermo, will count about 200 workers.

== Honours ==
OrdineLavoro

The 8 September 1907 he was invested Knight of the Order of Merit for Labour.

== Gallery ==
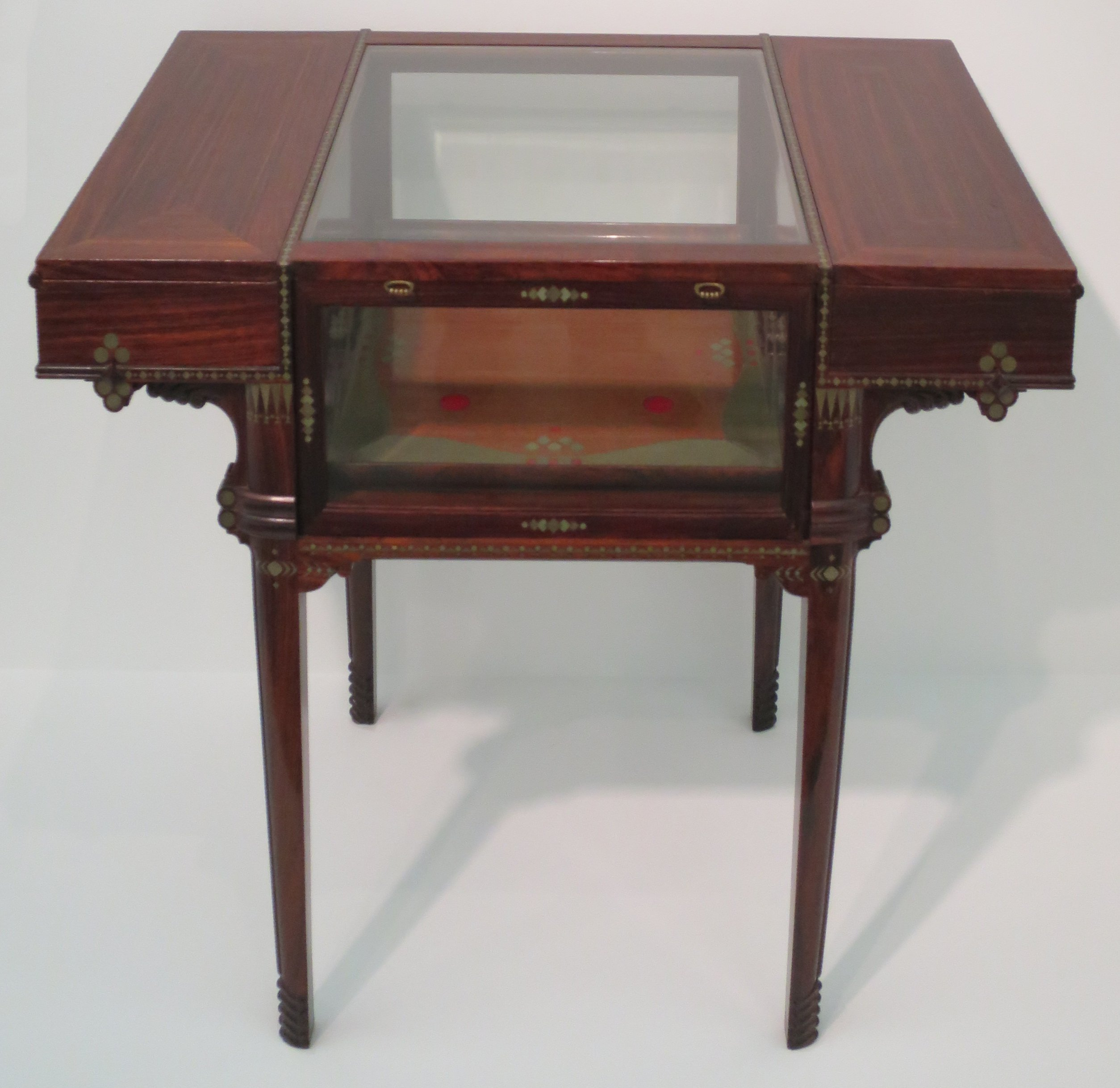
Eugenio Quarti, Wolfsonian-FIU Museum Table (1914–15) (USA)

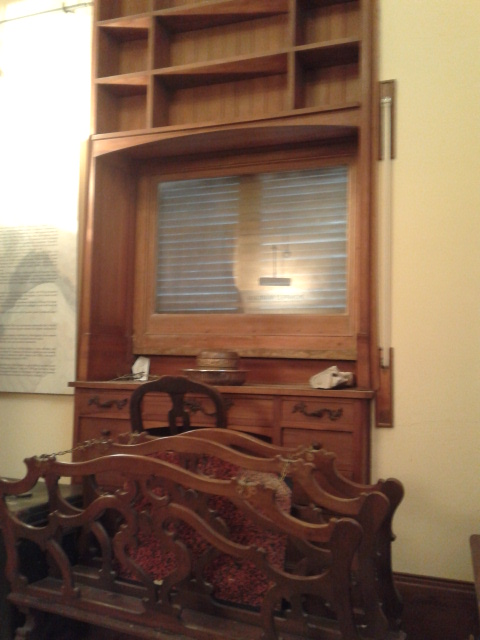
Library made by Eugenio Quarti for Villa Mariani in Bordighera
