= Alessandro Mazzucotelli =

Italian artisan (1865–1938)

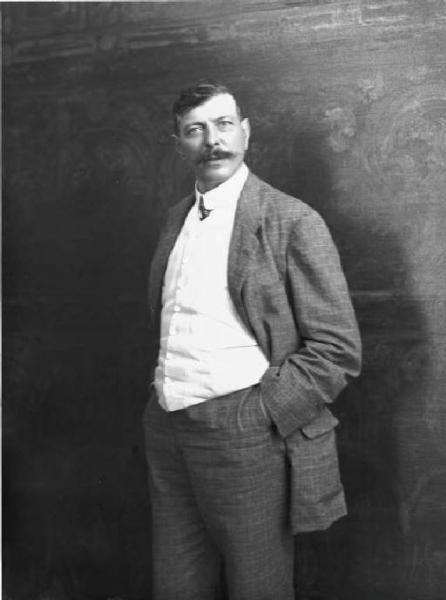

Personal details
- Profession: artigiano
- Website: http://storia.camera.it/deputato/alessandro-mazzucotelli-18651230#nav

Alessandro Mazzucotelli (Lodi, December 30, 1865 - Milan, January 29, 1938) was an Italian craftsman, particularly known as a master ironworker and decorator. A specialist in wrought iron, Mazzucotelli linked his fame to the decorations of the works of the major exponents of Art Nouveau in Italy and abroad.

== Biography ==
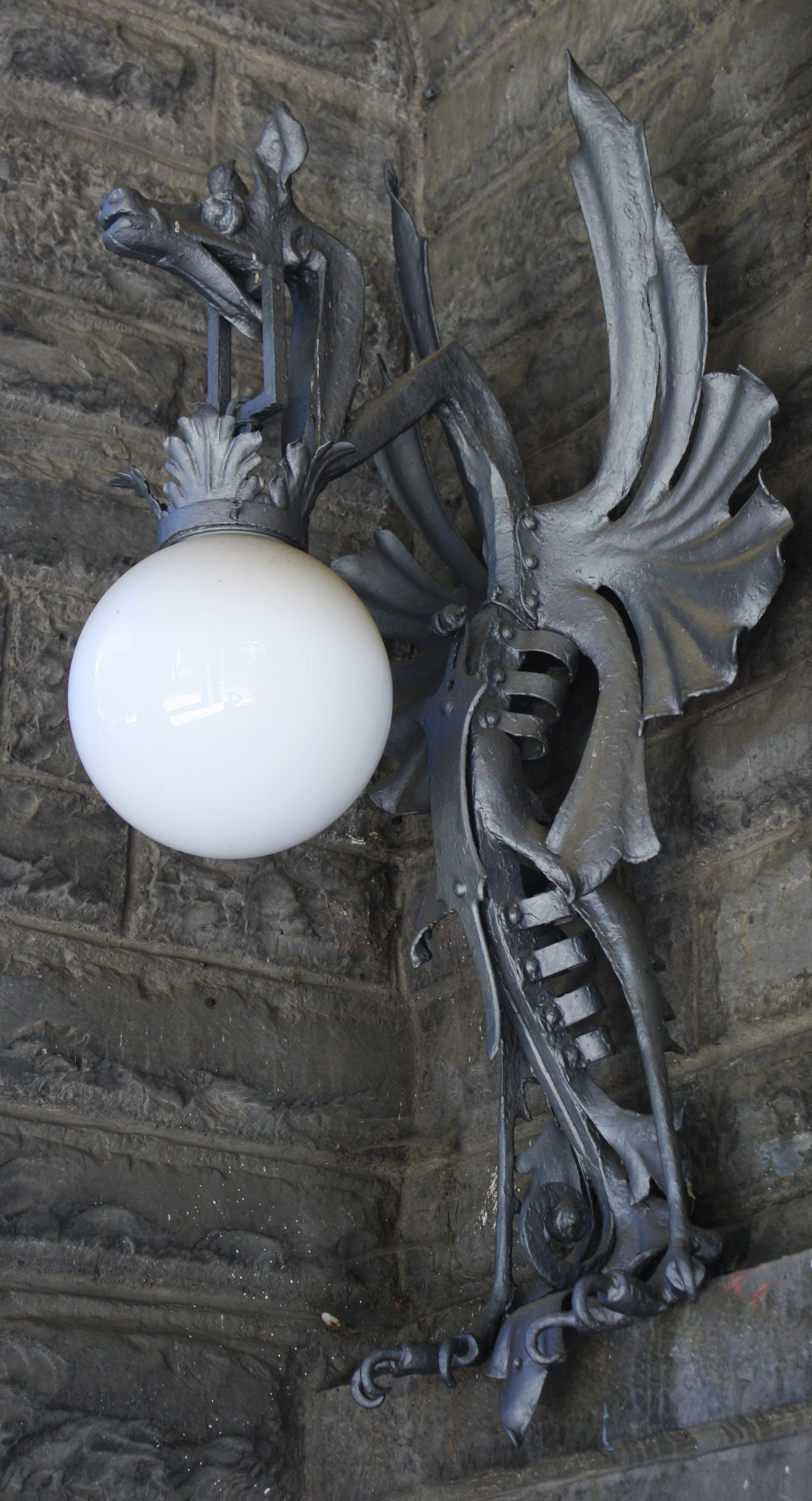
A. Mazzucotelli Wrought iron lamppost villa Ottolini-Tosi, Busto Arsizio

Mazzucotelli was born in Lodi to Giovanni Valente, an iron merchant originally from Locatello di valle Imagna, and Rosa Caprara. At the age of 18 he moved to Milan as an apprentice with his brother Carlo in the blacksmith store of Defendente Oriani, which he later took over in 1891. From 1902 to 1908 the company running the shop was called Mazzucotelli-Engelmann; later he worked alone, first in via Ponchielli and then in 1909 at Bicocca.

Mazzucotelli collaborated with architects such as Enrico Zanoni, Giuseppe Sommaruga, Gaetano Moretti, Ernesto Pirovano, Franco Oliva, Ulisse Stacchini and Silvio Gambini.

In his early years he was influenced by the painter Giovanni Beltrami who founded the largest Milanese glassworks dedicated to Art Nouveau.

In 1902 he distinguished himself at the first International Exhibition of Modern Decorative Art in Turin; Charles Rennie Mackintosh, Louis Comfort Tiffany and Peter Behrens participated in it. The following year he made a trip to several European countries together with Eugenio Quarti and on his return, he became a lecturer at the Umanitaria.

In this period of time he completed his first important commissions such as the Palazzo dell'ex Borsa (now the Post Office) in Milan, the Villa Ottolini-Tosi in Busto Arsizio and the Ville Fabbro and Villa Antonini in Mogliano Veneto.

Mazzucotelli used to make a sketch by observing nature, then returned to his workshop to rework it by making a life-size drawing on cardboard and then cut out, so as to have a more concrete vision of his project.

In 1906 he participated alongside Eugenio Quarti at the International Exhibition of Sempione in Milan, exhibiting the "Gate of Gladioli", now on display at the Gallery of Modern Art Carlo Rizzarda of Feltre. Remarkable were also the realizations for Villa Faccanoni-Romeo (via Buonarroti 48) and Casa Tensi (via Vivaio 4) in Milan, the Kursaal of San Pellegrino Terme, the Palace Grand Hotel and the Grand Hotel Campo dei Fiori in Varese.

His activity intensified after the opening of his new company in Bicocca, in 1909, where he began to work with South American clients and to intervene on celebratory buildings such as the Expiatory Chapel in Monza, the city named a street after him.

In 1922 he founded and directed the Istituto Superiore per le Industrie Artistiche (ISIA) in Monza, where he had as a student and successor to the chair of wrought iron Gino Manara; he was president of the International Biennial Exhibition of Applied Arts in 1923 where he presented the gate "Groviglio di serpi".

Among the exhibitions in which he participated later include the Exposition Universelle et Internationale in Brussels (1910) and the Exposition Internationale des Arts Décoratifs et Industriels Modernes in Paris (1925).

He was called by Pompeo Mariani to decorate his villa in Bordighera and Gabriele D'Annunzio for the Vittoriale degli Italiani in Gardone Riviera. In 1929 he was elected deputy to the Chamber in the XXVIII legislature of the Kingdom of Italy.

The City of Milan has named the street Alessandro Mazzucotelli near Viale Forlanini, in the eastern suburbs of the city, after the artist.

== Museum ==
- Museum Wolfsonian-FIU, Florida United States
- Musée d'Orsay, Paris
- Villa Bernasconi Museum, Cernobbio Lake Como
- Carlo Rizzarda Modern Art Gallery
- Civic Collection of Prints Achille Bertarelli, Sforza Castle, Milan
- National Museum of Science and Technology "Leonardo da Vinci"

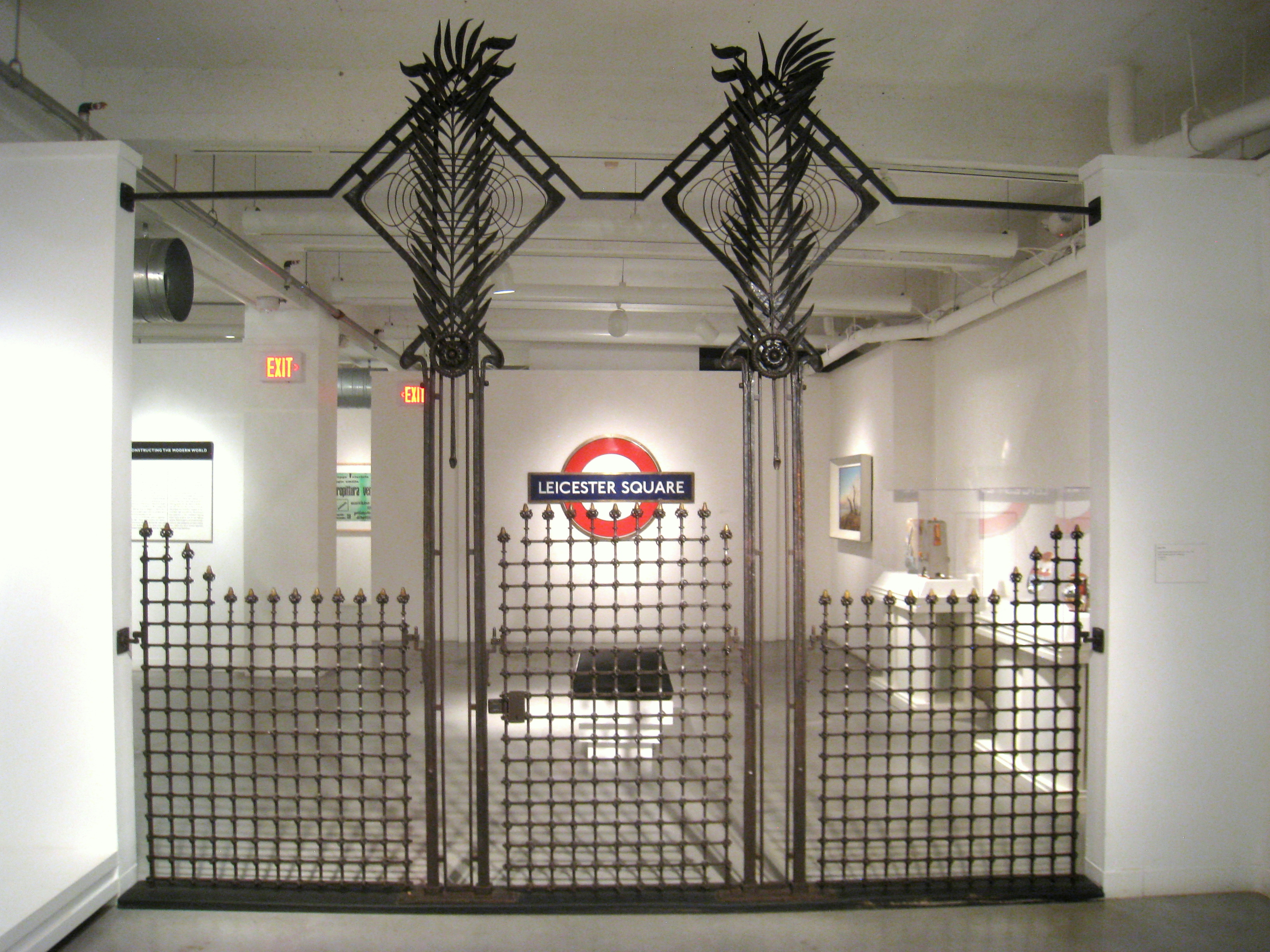
Wolfsonian-FIU Museum, Florida, USA

== Honors ==
Cavaliere del Lavoro - ribbon for ordinary uniform

Cavaliere del Lavoro
— 10 marzo 1912

== Works ==
=== Milan ===
- Piazza del Duomo street lamps with Giannino Castiglioni
- Savini cafe - Pensilina di Mazzucotelli, via Ugo Foscolo, 5, 20121
- Palazzo Zanoni (1886) in Viale Bligny 60; architect: Enrico Zanoni
- House of black cat (1889) in Corso Monforte 43; architect : Enrico Zanoni
- Bar Camparino, Galleria Vittorio Emanuele II (1925), the chandeliers
- Palazzo Castiglioni (1903) in Corso Venezia 47; architect: Giuseppe Sommaruga
- The gate of the Milan Fair in Largo Domodossola (1923)
- Casa Ferrario (1902) in via Spadari 3–5; architect: Ernesto Pirovano
- Casa Apostolo (1907) in via Tasso 10; architect Stacchini, internal gate and wrought iron balustrades of the balconies
- Casa (1909) in Corso Magenta 31
- Casa de Moneta, Cancello delle farfalle (1904) in via Ausonio 3
- Casa Campanini (1904) in via Bellini 11
- Casa Guazzoni (1906) in Malpighi street 12; architect: Giovanni Battista Bossi
- Palazzo della Posta (1907) (ex-Borsa) in Piazza Cordusio 2; architect Luigi Broggi
- Villa Romeo Faccanoni (1908) today Clinica Columbus, architect: Giuseppe Sommaruga
- Palazzo Berri-Meregalli (1913) via Cappuccini 8,
- Cinema Corso in via Torino,
- Palazzo della Banca Commerciale Italiana (1923), the railings
- Maria Luisa Villa (1925) in via Tamburini 8; the gates and the small trees
- Pathé Palace in via Luigi Settembrini 11
- Cambiaghi's house (1903-1904) by Ulisse Stacchini with wrought iron by Mazzucotelli in via Carlo Pisacane, 22, 20129
- Casa Tensi, (1907-1909) by Ernesto Pirovano, wrought irons by Alessandro Mazzucotelli, cements by Pirovano in via Vivaio, 4, 20122

== Sarnico ==
- Villa Pietro Faccanoni (1907) now Villa Passeri in Sarnico (BG)
- Villa Giuseppe Faccanoni (1907) Sarnico in 1907
- Villa Luigi Faccanoni (1912) now Villa Surre in Sarnico

== Elsewhere in Italy ==
- Villa Bernasconi (1905) (Liberty Arch. Campanini) in Cernobbio
- Expiatory Chapel gate (1910) in Monza
- Villa Mariani in Bordighera (1910), for which he created gates, street lamps, grilles but especially the parapet of the balcony particularly original.
- The Grand Hotel Regina in Salsomaggiore Terme (1911; architect Giuseppe Boni) decorations on the facade
- Gabbia del pozzo Scotti in Salsomaggiore Terme (1912; architect Giuseppe Boni)
- The railings, the lamps and the gate of Villa Marmori (1923, architect Franco Oliva) (today Conservatory G.Puccini) in La Spezia
- The railings, the lamps, the gutters of the hotels Campo dei Fiori, Palace, Ristorante Belvedere in Varese, (1908 - 1913, architect Giuseppe Sommaruga)
- The wrought iron of Villa Marmori, La Spezia (1923)
- Door and candelabra of the staircase of Palazzo della Loggia in Brescia
- The gate of Villa Facheris in Inzago (MI)
- Appliques of the restaurant Napoli in Palermo by Carmelo Ingrao (1912)
- Dosso Pisani (1905-1907) Cardina, Como
- "Cancello dei gladioli" (1905) now at the Carlo Rizzarda Gallery of Modern Art in Feltre
- Railings and gates of Casa Maffei, corso Montevecchio 50, Turin (1905)
- Grand Hôtel des Thèrmes in Salsomaggiore Terme (1901; architect Luigi Broggi) entrance canopy, grilles and balustrades
- The wrought iron of Villa Ottolini-Tosi and Villa Ottolini-Tovaglieri in Busto Arsizio
- The chandeliers of the Palazzo Gallavresi in Caravaggio
- The Kursaal Diana at the thermal baths of San Pellegrino
- The Palace of Luigi Cernuschi in Via Bergamo 18 in Monza

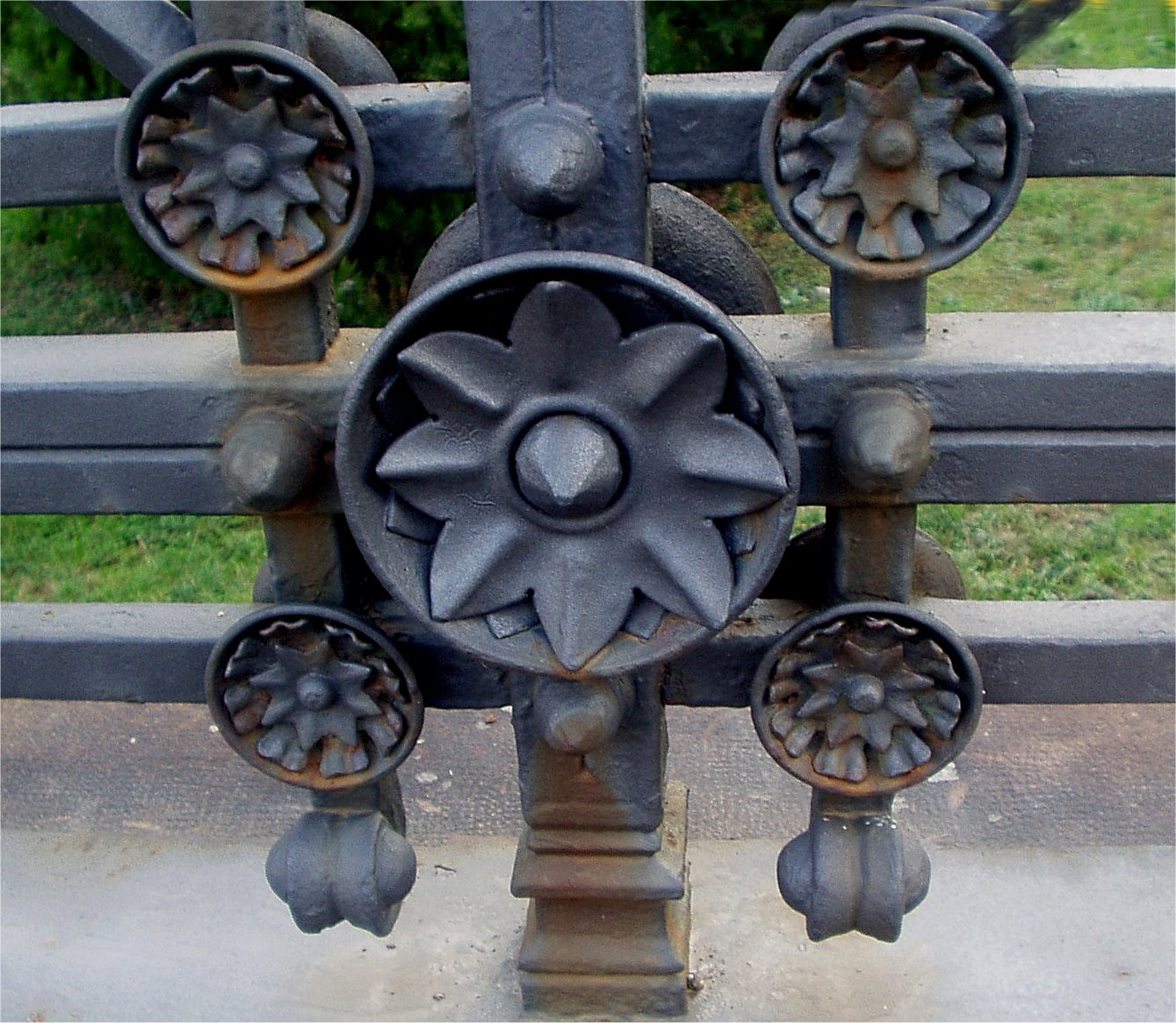
Detail of the gate of the Expiatory chapel in Monza

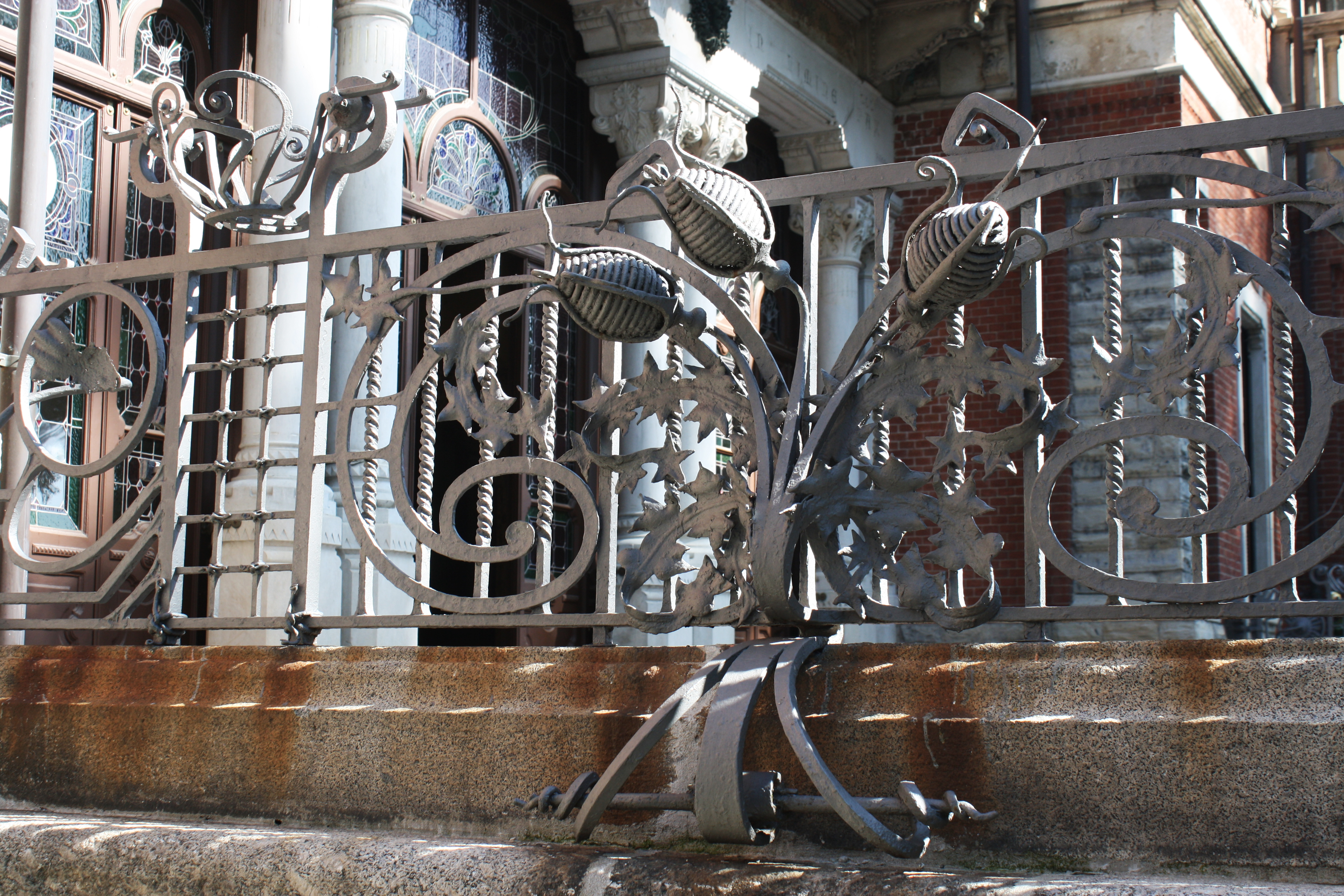
The wrought irons depicting plant elements of the Ottolini-Tosi villa in Busto Arsizio

=== Abroad ===
- The 10 wrought iron gates of the Palacio de Bellas Artes in Mexico City (architect Adamo Boari)
- Villa X in Buenos Aires (the balconies).
- Buildings constructed in Bangkok, Thailand, by Annibale Rigotti between 1907 and 1926.
- The wrought iron gate of the Museo de Arte Italiano in Lima, about 1921

== Gallery ==
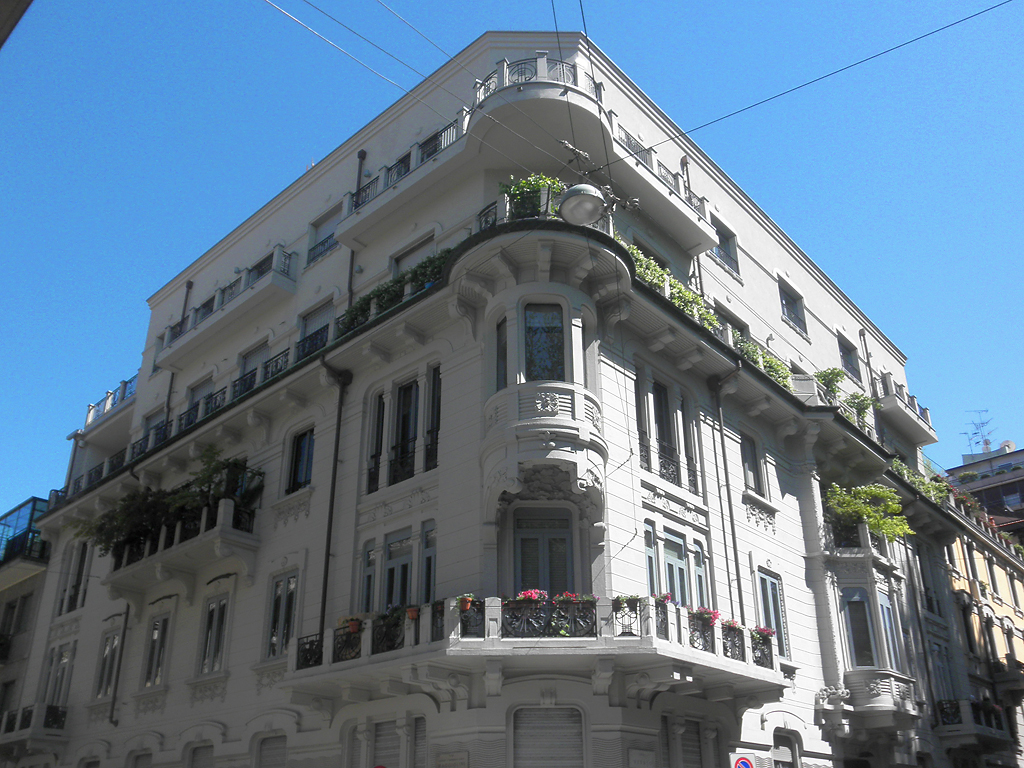
Casa Tensi, Milan

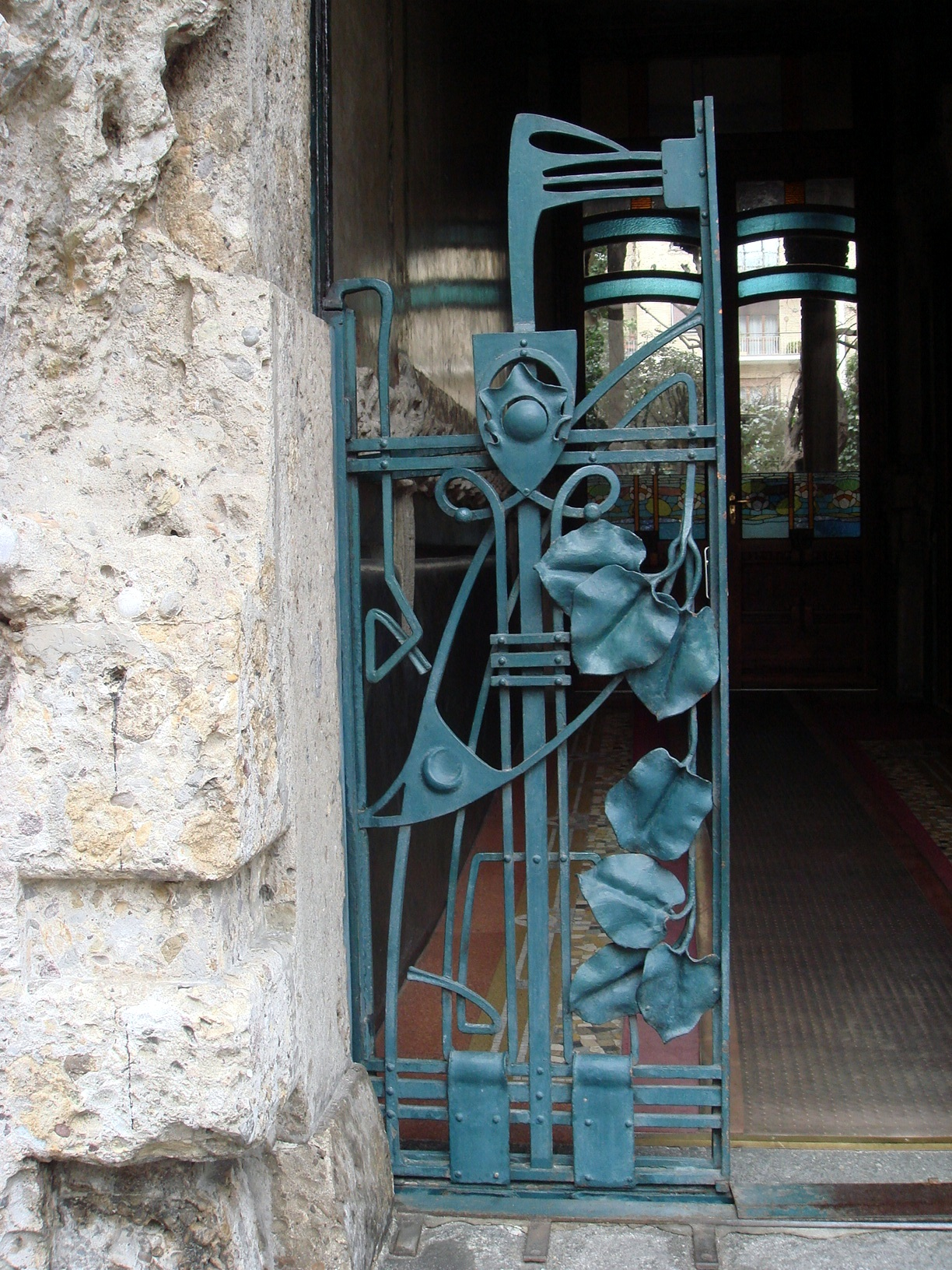
Casa Campanini, Milan (1904)

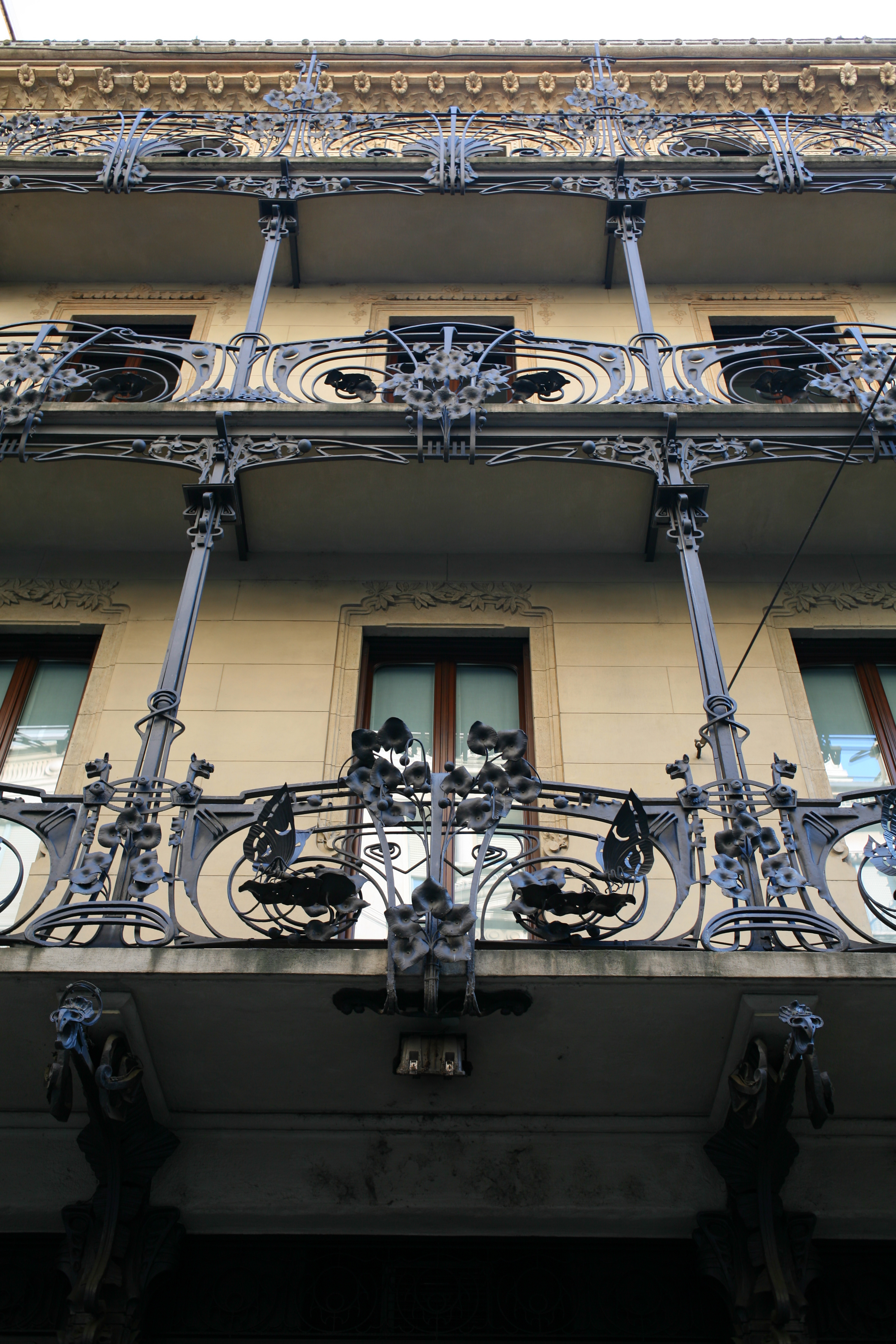
Casa Ferrario, Milan (1904)

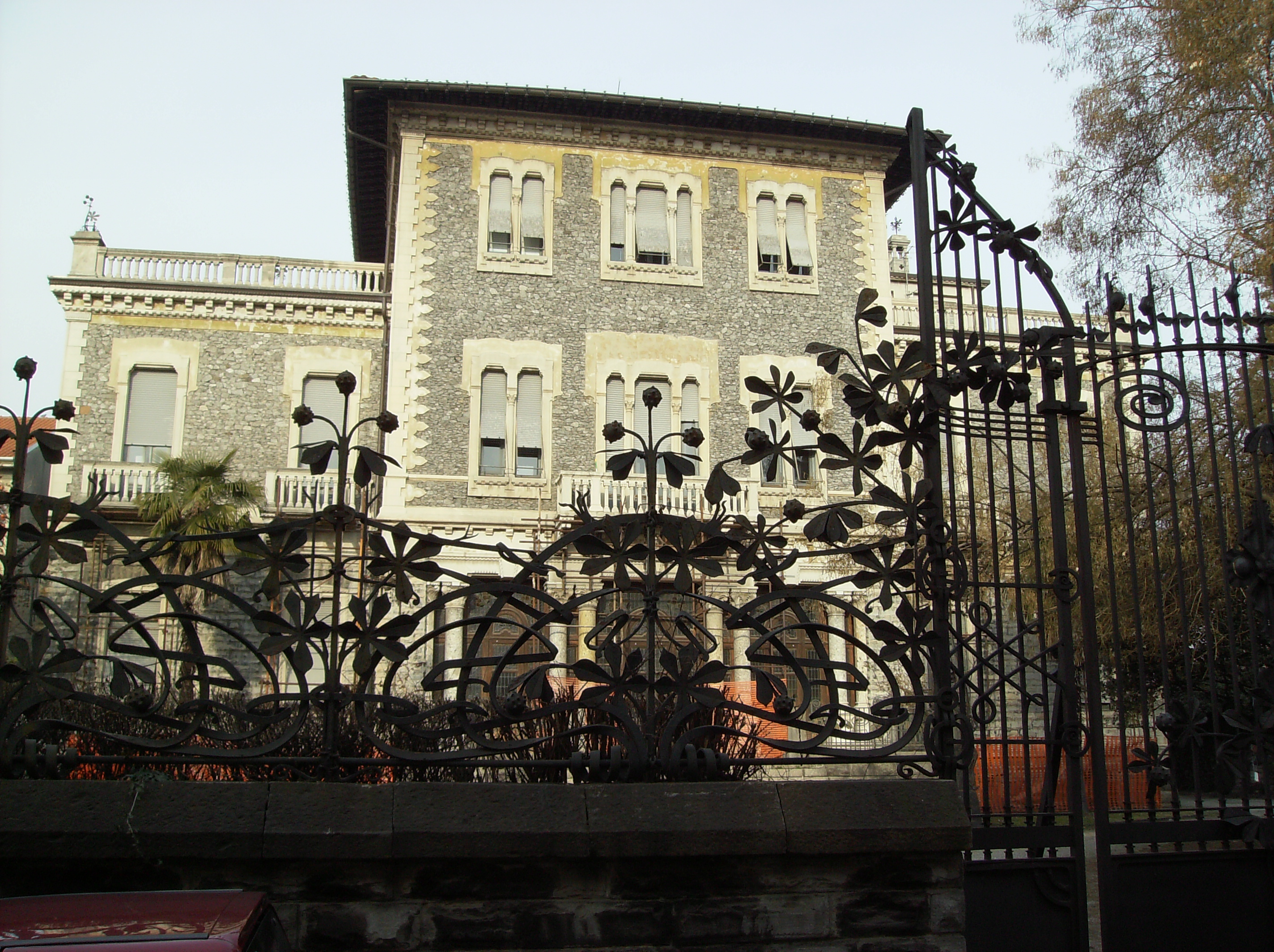
Villa Ottolini-Tovaglieri, cancellata, Busto Arsizio

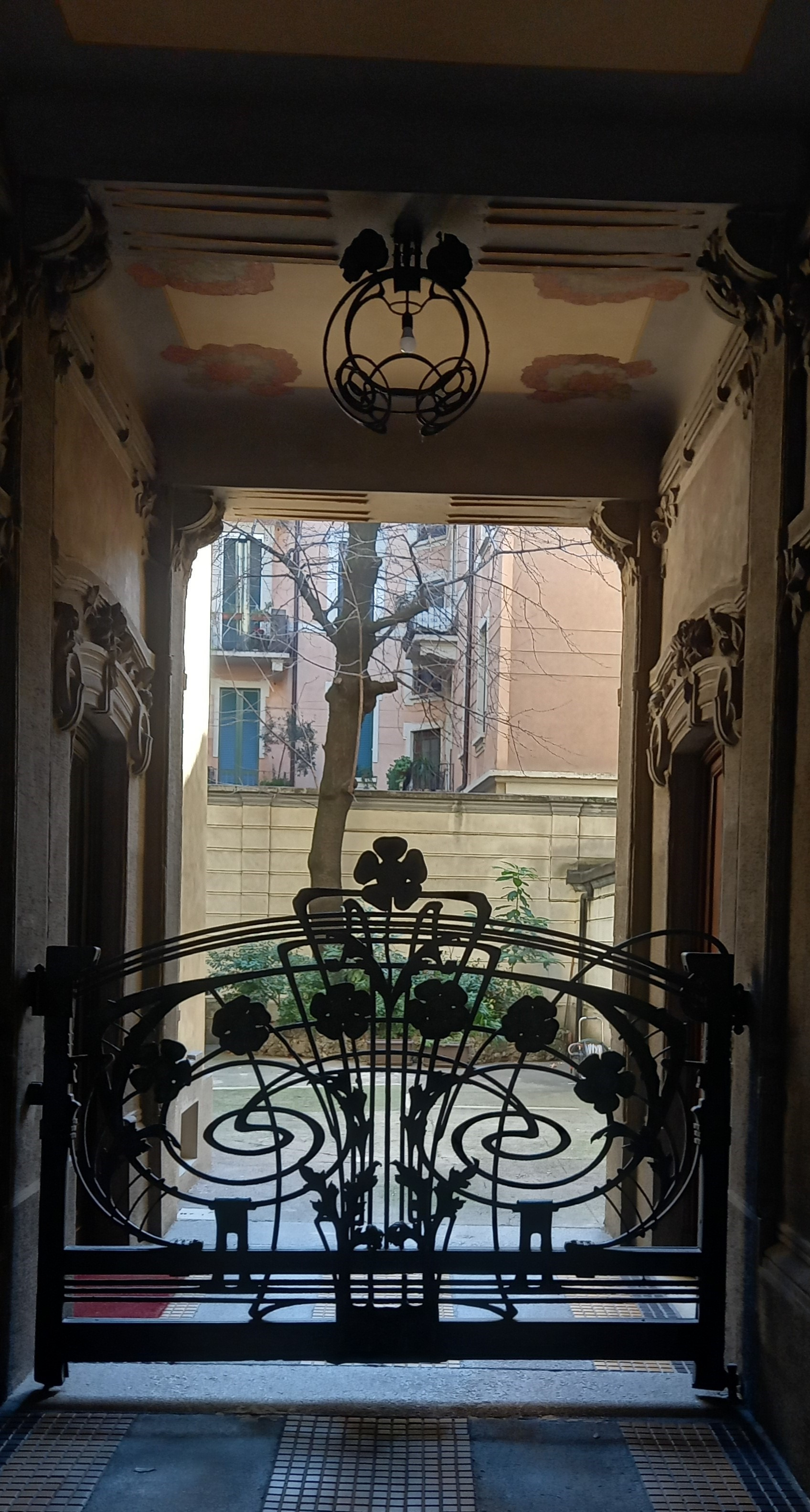
Casa Guazzoni, cancello, Milan

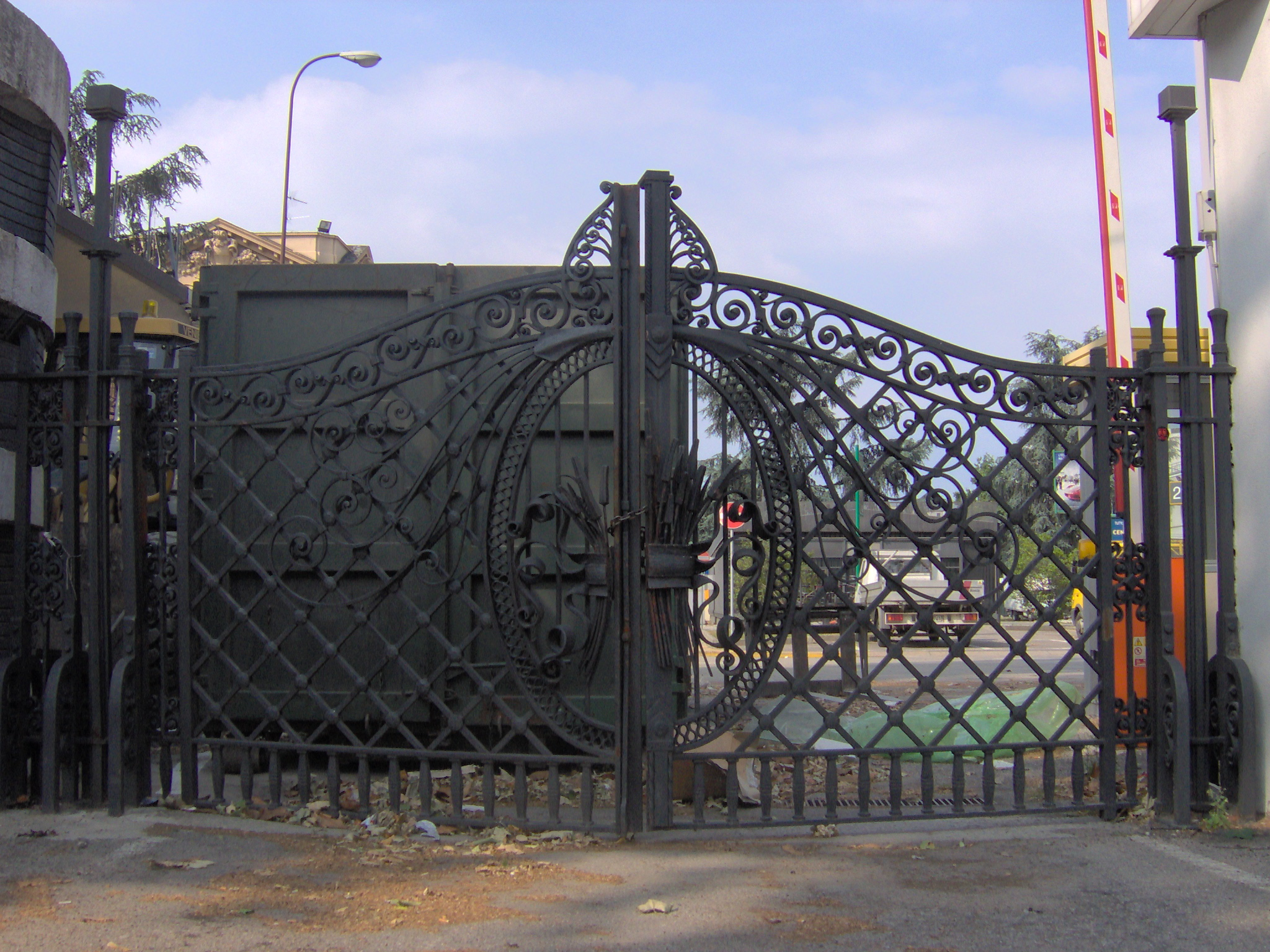
Cancello della Fiera di Milano

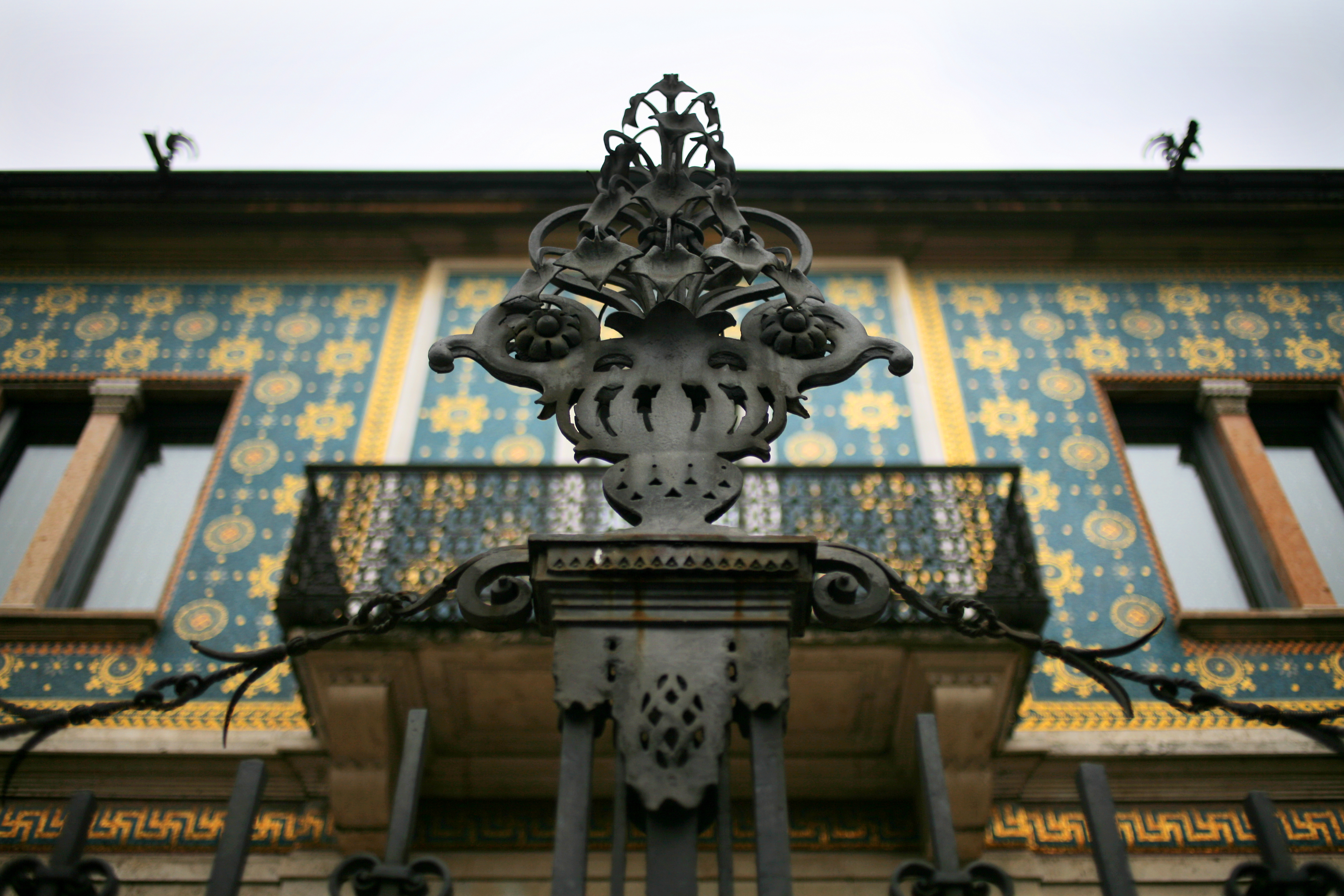
Particolare della cancellata del Villino Maria Luisa, Milan

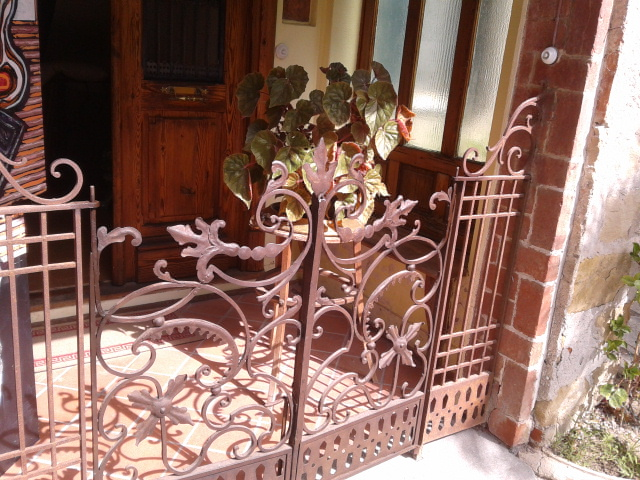
Villa Mariani, cancelletto, Bordighera

== See also ==
- Art Nouveau
- Art Nouveau in Milan
- Art Nouveau in Turin

== Bibliography ==
- Pica, Vittorio, Alessandro Mazzucotelli, Milan, Galleria Pesaro, s.d.
- Bossaglia, Rossana, Hammacher, Arno M., Mazzucotelli: l'artista italiano del ferro battuto liberty, Ed. italiana, inglese e tedesca, Milano, Il Polifilo, 1971 - ISBN
- Giuseppe Maria Jonghi Lavarini, Franco Magnani, Sette secoli di ferro: Manuale pratico per riconoscere gli stili e giudicare la qualità del ferro battuto Con un'appendice su Alessandro Mazzucotelli, Milano, Di Baio Editore, 1991 - ISBN
- Ferro e liberty: Alessandro Mazzucotelli, architettura, fabbri di oggi, a cura del Gruppo architettura storia dell'arte, Comune di Monza, Biblioteca civica, Milan, Magma, [1979?]
- L'ISIA a Monza una scuola d'arte europea, a cura di Rossana Bossaglia e Alberto Crespi, Cinisello Balsamo (Milano), Amilcare Pizzi, 1986.
- Augusto Vecchi, "Il grande libro del ferro battuto", New Book, La Spezia, 2004 - ISBN
