= Campanini =

Origin
- Language: Italian
- Region of origin: Italy

Campanini is an Italian surname. People with the surname include:

- Barbara Campanini (1721–1799) Italian ballerina
- Carlo Campanini (1906–1984), Italian actor, singer and comedian
- Cleofonte Campanini (1860–1919) Italian conductor
- Italo Campanini (1845–1896), Italian operatic tenor, brother of Cleofonte

== See also ==
- Casa Campanini, a building in Milan, Italy
