= Casa Guazzoni =

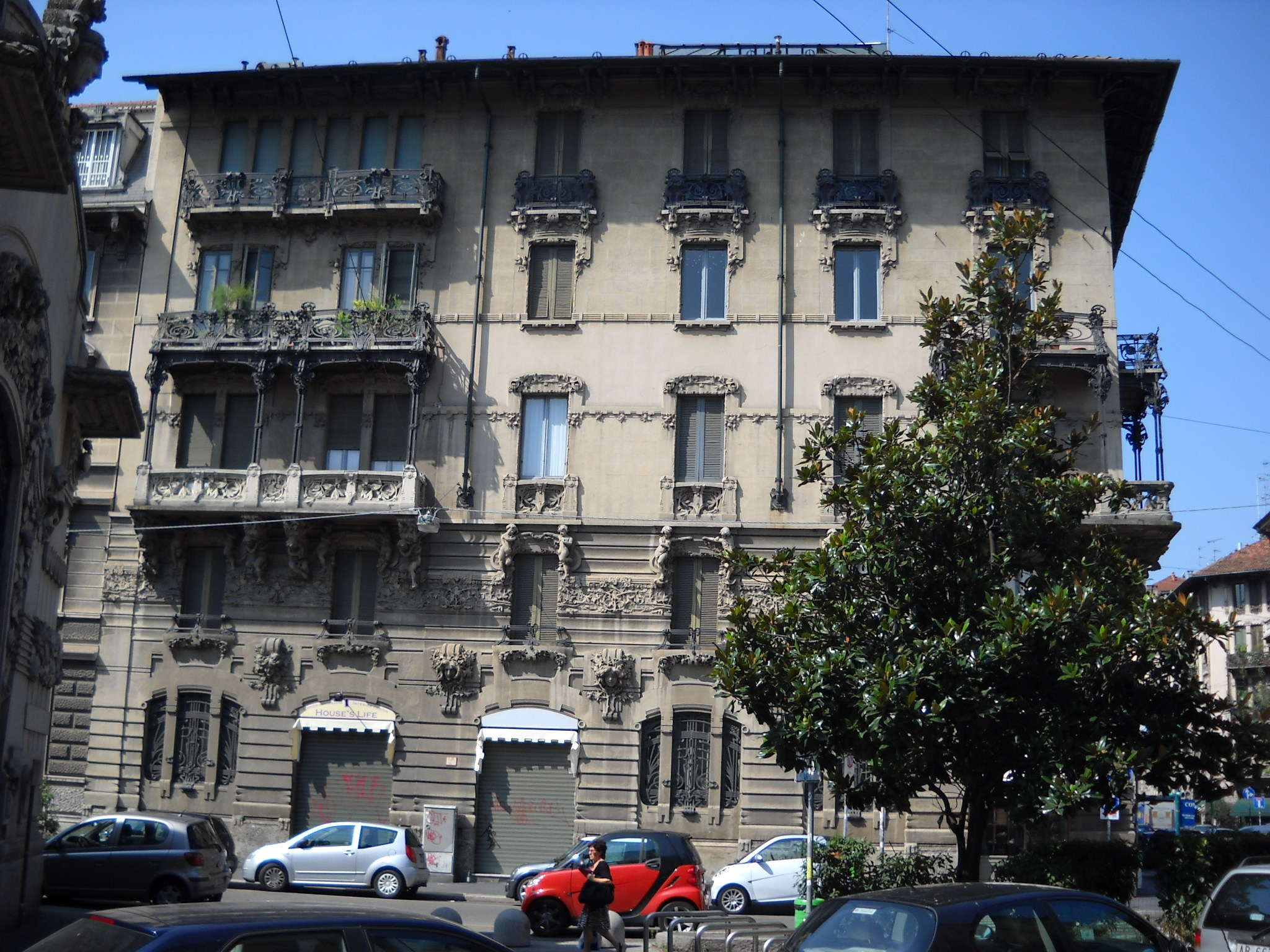
- Casa Guazzoni from via Melzo
- Interactive map of Casa Guazzoni
- Location: Milan
- Coordinates: 45°28′29.32″N 9°12′29″E
- Designer: arch. Giovanni Battista Bossi
- Type: Art Nouveau building
- Material: bricks, wrought-iron, decorated cement
- Beginning date: 1904
- Completion date: 1906
- Opening date: 1906
- Restored date: 1982

Casa Guazzoni is a building at via Malpighi 12 in Milan in the Liberty style, or Italian Art Nouveau.

== History of the building ==
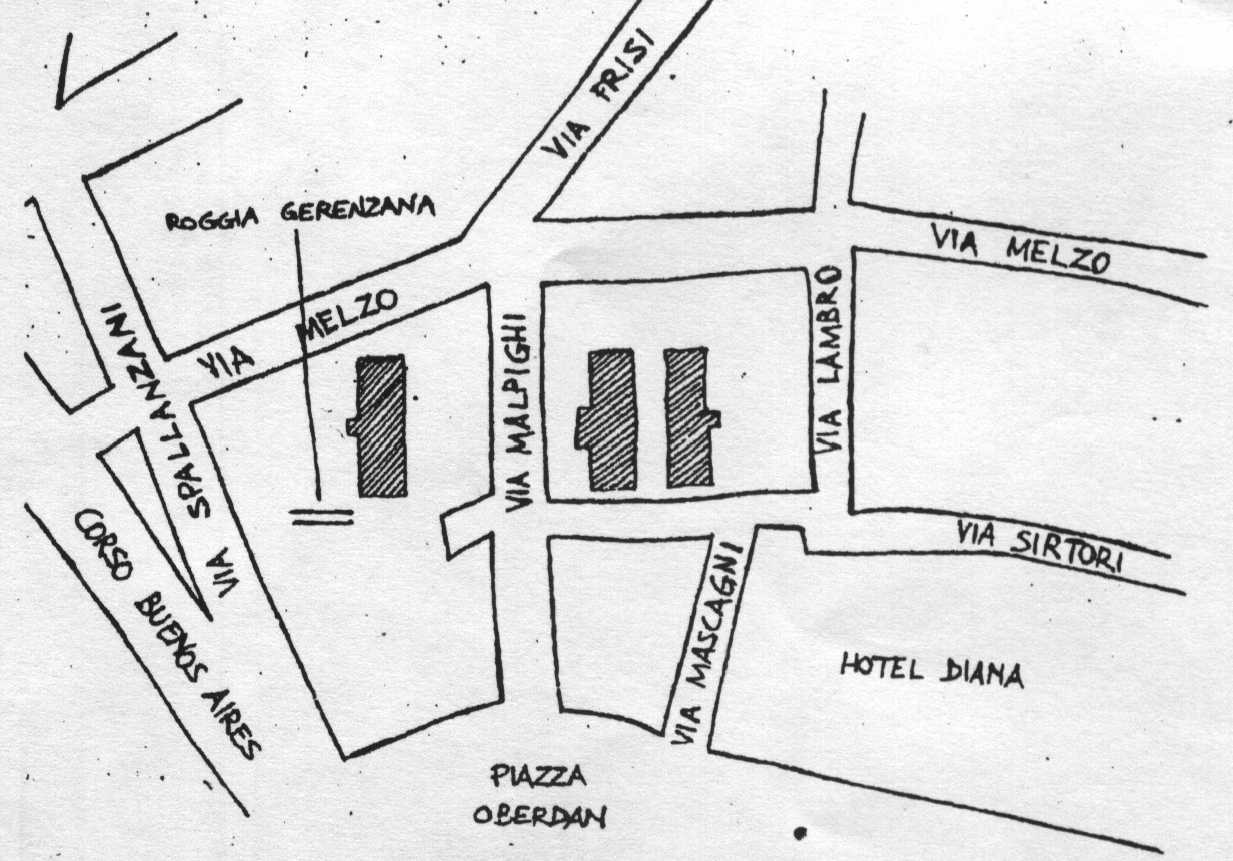
Still existing stables of S.A.O.

It was planned by architect Giovanni Battista Bossi (1864–1924) in 1904–1906 on behalf of Cav. Giacomo Guazzoni, who was living before in via Leonardo da Vinci 49/a, master builder as a profession. Guazzoni was also the executer of the work.

The house was built in a part of the area previously occupied by Società Anonima degli Omnibus (S.A.O), founded in 1861 to manage public transportation in Milan with horse trams and which also had the concession of Tranvia Milano-Monza, inaugurated on 8 July 1876 by the future king Umberto I of Italy.

In 1900 the Municipality decided to publish a bid for a service of electric trams, won by Edison, S.A.O. was the second with the Westinghouse technology. The garage of via Sirtori which hosted 280 horses was closed, the land was sold to private people and the buildings demolished apart from 3 stables for 54 horses each, still visible in via Sirtori 32 (Twinset) e 24 (Nervesa shop).

Via Malpighi was opened and new houses were built along the street.

The building has been put under the protection of Beaux Arts on 3 May 1965 while all the area is under environmental protection from 6 February 2003.

The facade has been cleaned and restored in 1982 under the direction of arch. Hybsch by Alvini Restauri.

The decoration of the entrance and the staircase were restored by R.A. of arch. Piero Arosio in 1997.

The facade has been cleaned and restored again in 2022 by Naos Restauri of arch. Piero Arosio.

== Structure of the building ==
The building is made of a double body with the shape of an "L” on a trapezoidal lot and is located at the corner of via Malpighi with via Melzo.

The structure is made of supporting walls in bricks. The slab between the basement and the ground floor is made of reinforced concrete.

== The decorations ==
The motivation of the historical restriction is the following:

“Important example of Milan Art Nouveau. It is characterized by a free treatment of the cement material and the application of exquisite wrought-iron united with a vivacious figurative sense. The building with protruding eaves has on the corner two superimposed and linked together balconies. The decoration is important in the first floor and emerges with putti that sustain the balconies and railings adorned in various ways. Other balconies are linked to the first ones with coupled iron columns and also have iron railings designed with an expressive style coherence.”

"Differently from Casa Galimberti, here the cromatic effect, which should be chiaroscuro, is obtained using different materials: cement and iron are both structure and decoration. Also in this case the balconies and the windows become lighter going upwards, just as the decorations become simpler towards the top floor: the dense twine of putti and wreaths, sculpted in cement around the windows and the railings of the first floor becomes simpler in the vibrant and sharp weave of the above iron work. The architectural and decorative composition is very well chosen and extremely proportionate in its elements."

The paintings in the belt between the second and the third floor have been lost.

The driveway has a fine wrought-iron gate and frescoes with putti and flowers that were discovered in the restoration of 1997, probably by painter Paolo Sala. Wrought-iron is probably by Alessandro Mazzucotelli.

In the entrance in front of the reception a painting of a lake with water plants has been discovered in 1997.

The body of the staircase is hexagonal, with a railing in wrought-iron and cantilever steps made of marble. In 1997 the marbled base and the flower decoration on the ceiling and the sides have been restored. The decorations follow the design of the wrought-iron and the entrance doors to the apartments.

== Sources ==
- S. Bariani, Casa Guazzoni e Casa Galimberti, due esempi di Liberty a Milano, tesi di laurea triennale in Scienze dell'Architettura presso il Politecnico di Milano, facoltà di Architettura e Società, A.A. 2007–2008
- Gianni Brizzi, Carlo Guenzi, Liberty occulto e G.B. Bossi, Casabella, luglio 1969, n. 338
- R. Bossaglia, il Liberty in Italia, Milano, 1968
- R. Bossaglia, Architettura Liberty a Milano, Milano, 1972
- M. Salvadè, D. Frizzi Brianza, Architettura Liberty a Milano, Milano, 1972
- Aldo Luigi Guazzoni, Chef Internazionale a Gstaad CH, Novara 1984
- F. Roiter, Milano in Liberty, Milano, 1993
- G. Lopez, E. Susani, Il Liberty a Milano e Lombardia, Milano, 1999

== Images ==
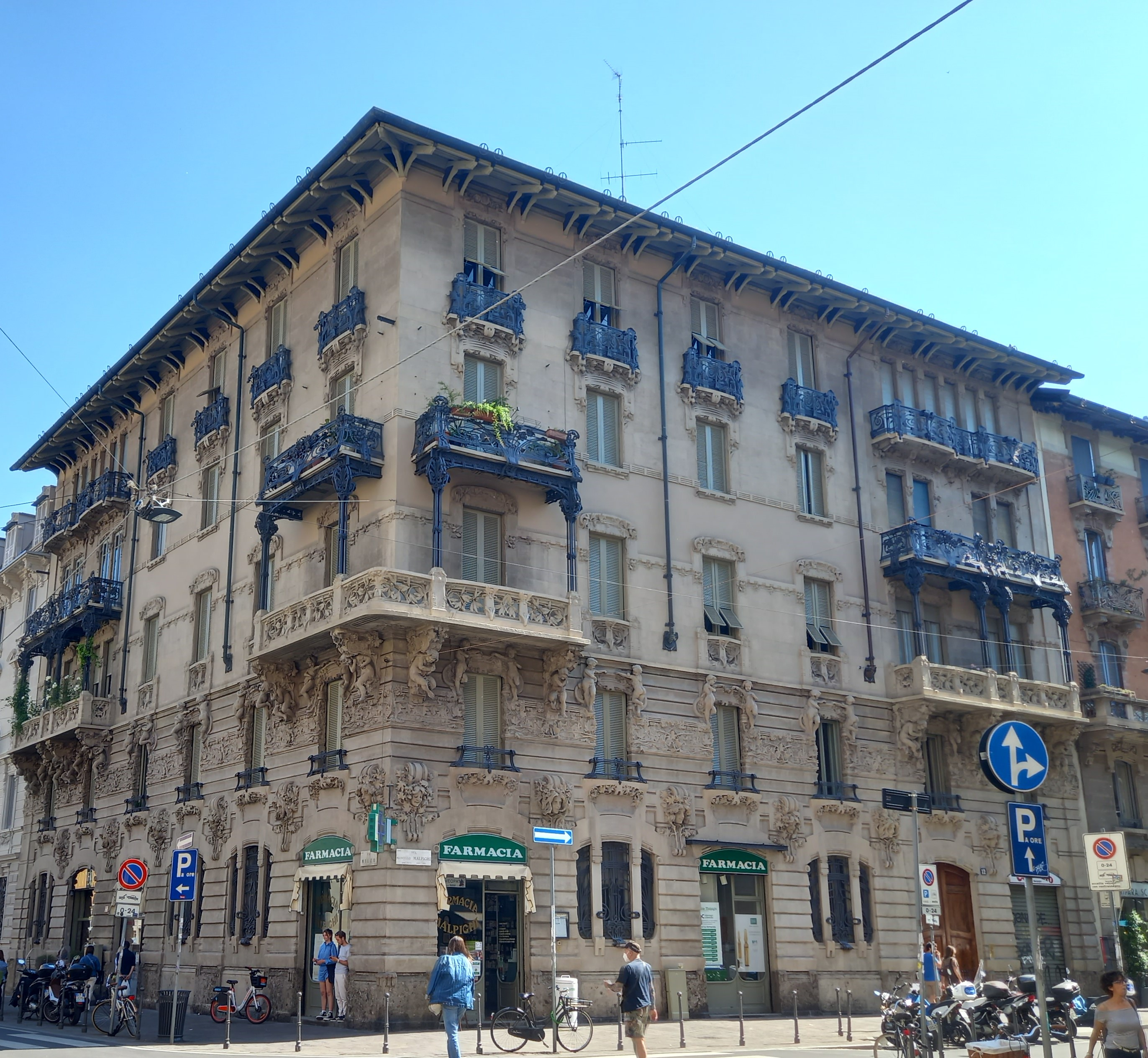
Casa Guazzoni, facades after 2022 restoration

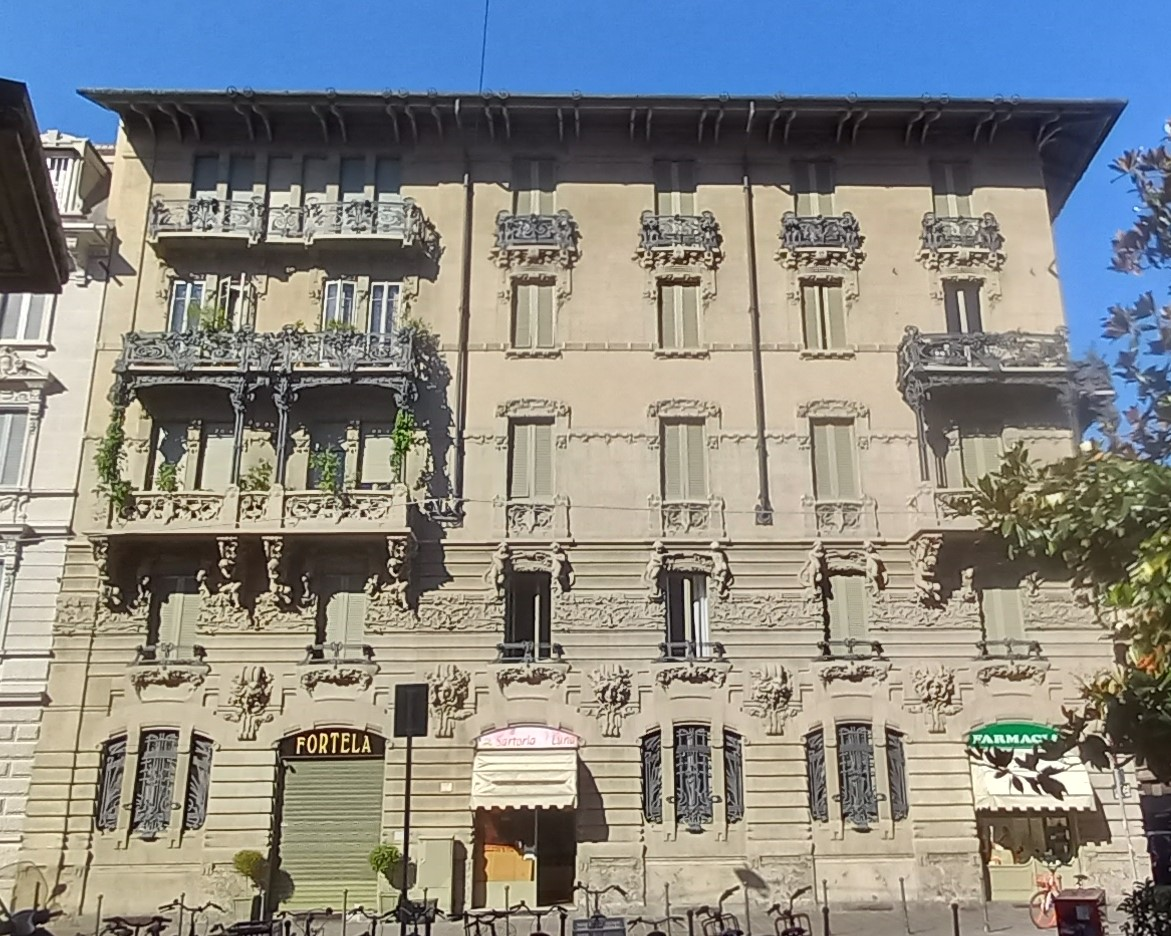
Casa Guazzoni, facade on via Melzo after 2022 restoration

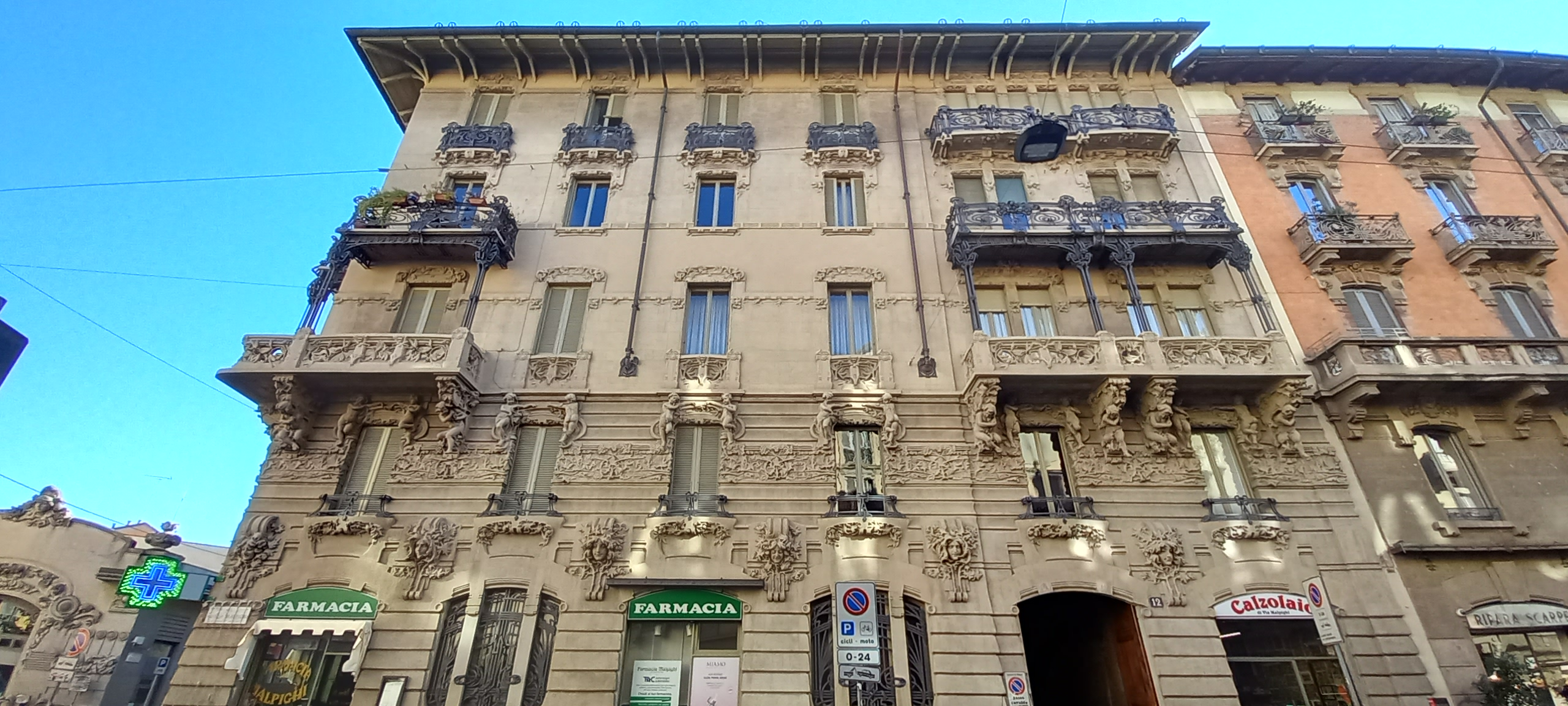
Casa Guazzoni, facade on via Malpighi after 2022 restoration

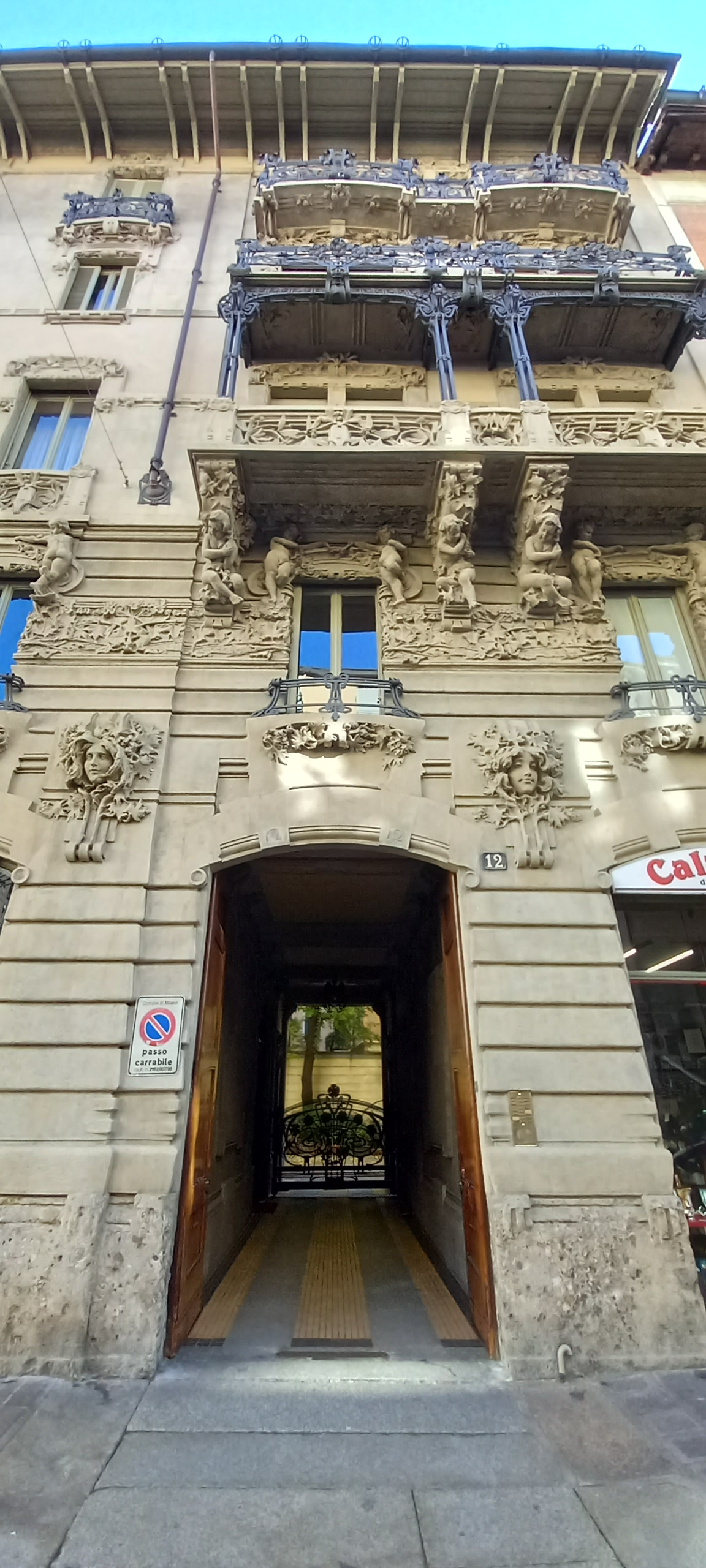
Casa Guazzoni, detail of the facade on via Malpighi after 2022 restoration

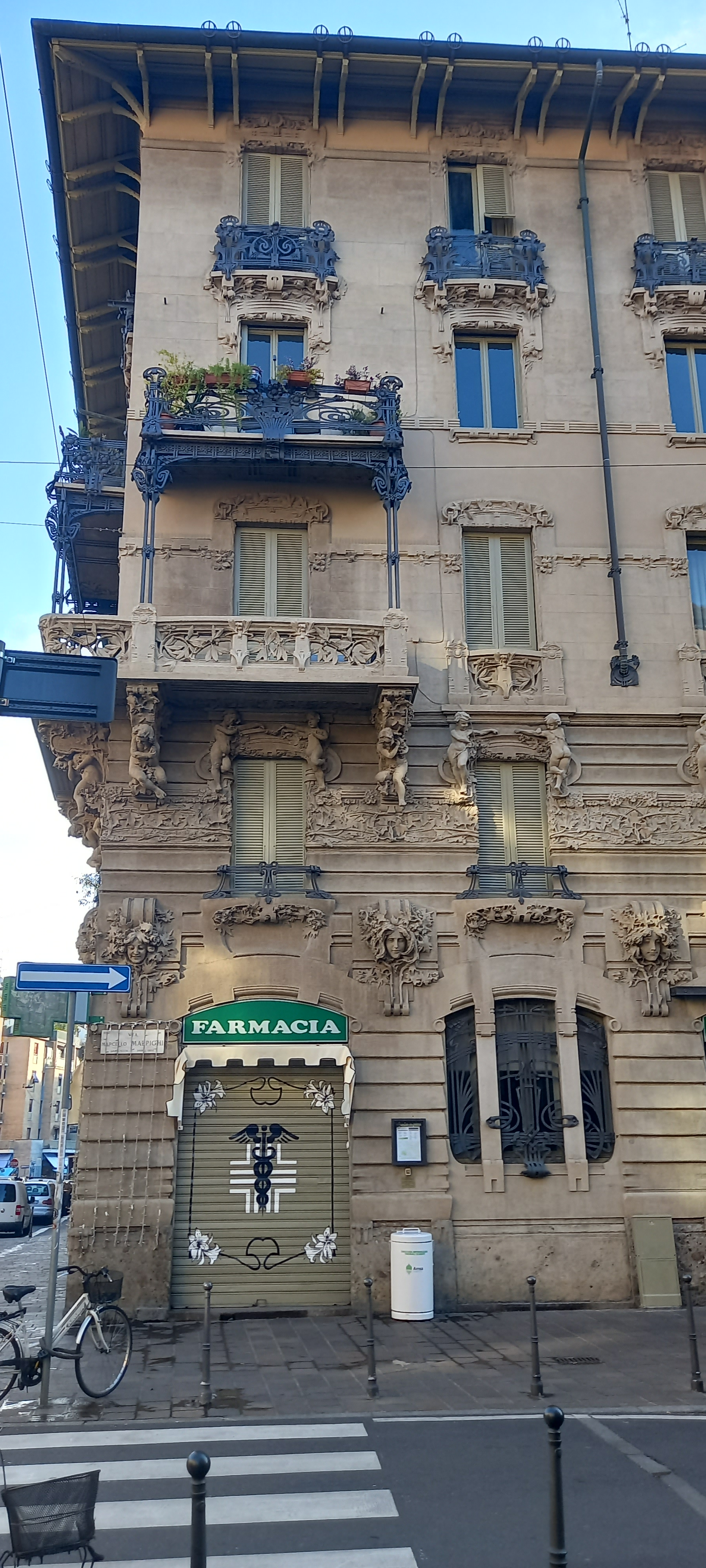
Casa Guazzoni, detail of the door of the pharmacy after 2022 restoration

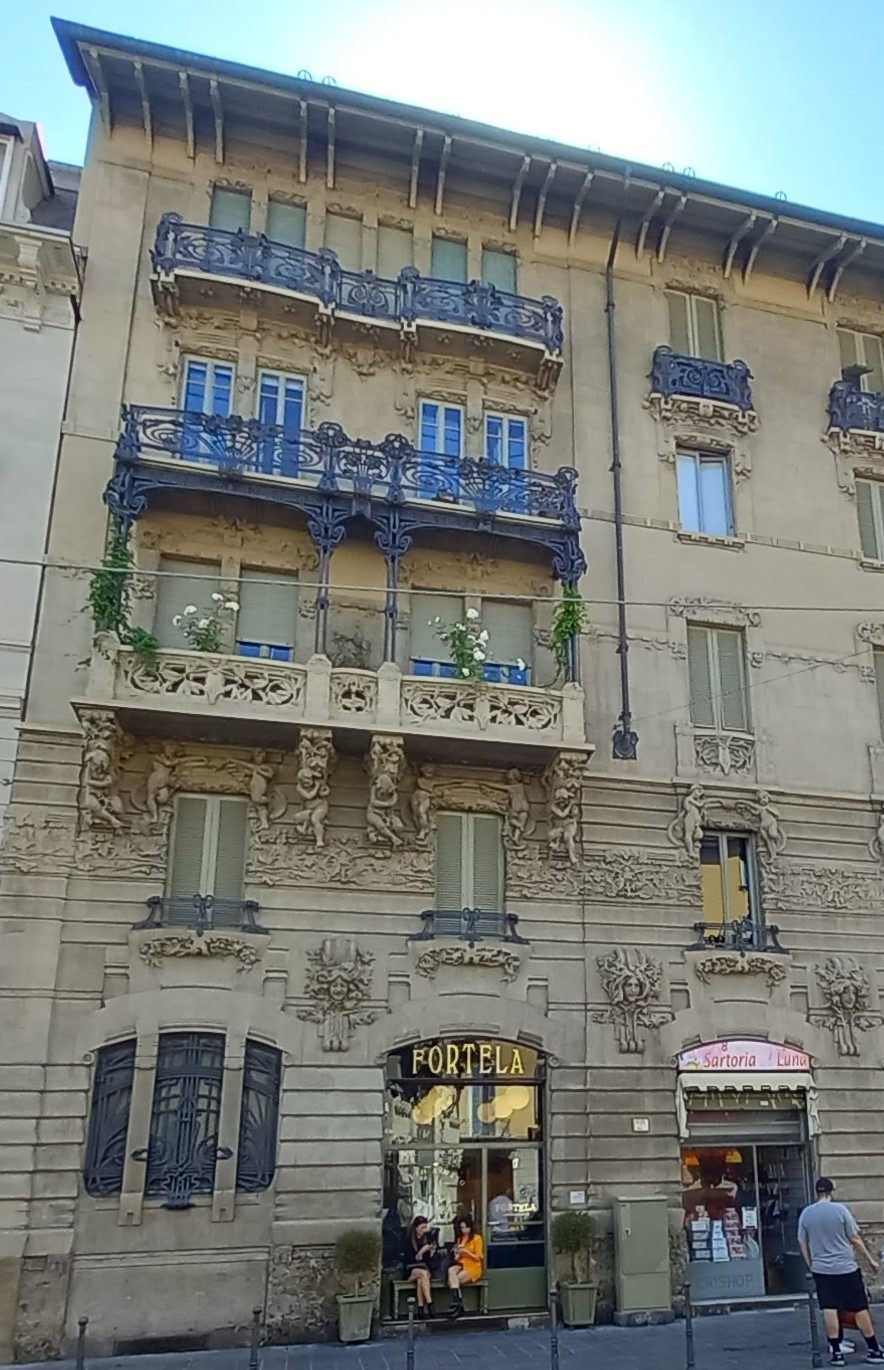
Casa Guazzoni, balconies overlooking via Melzo

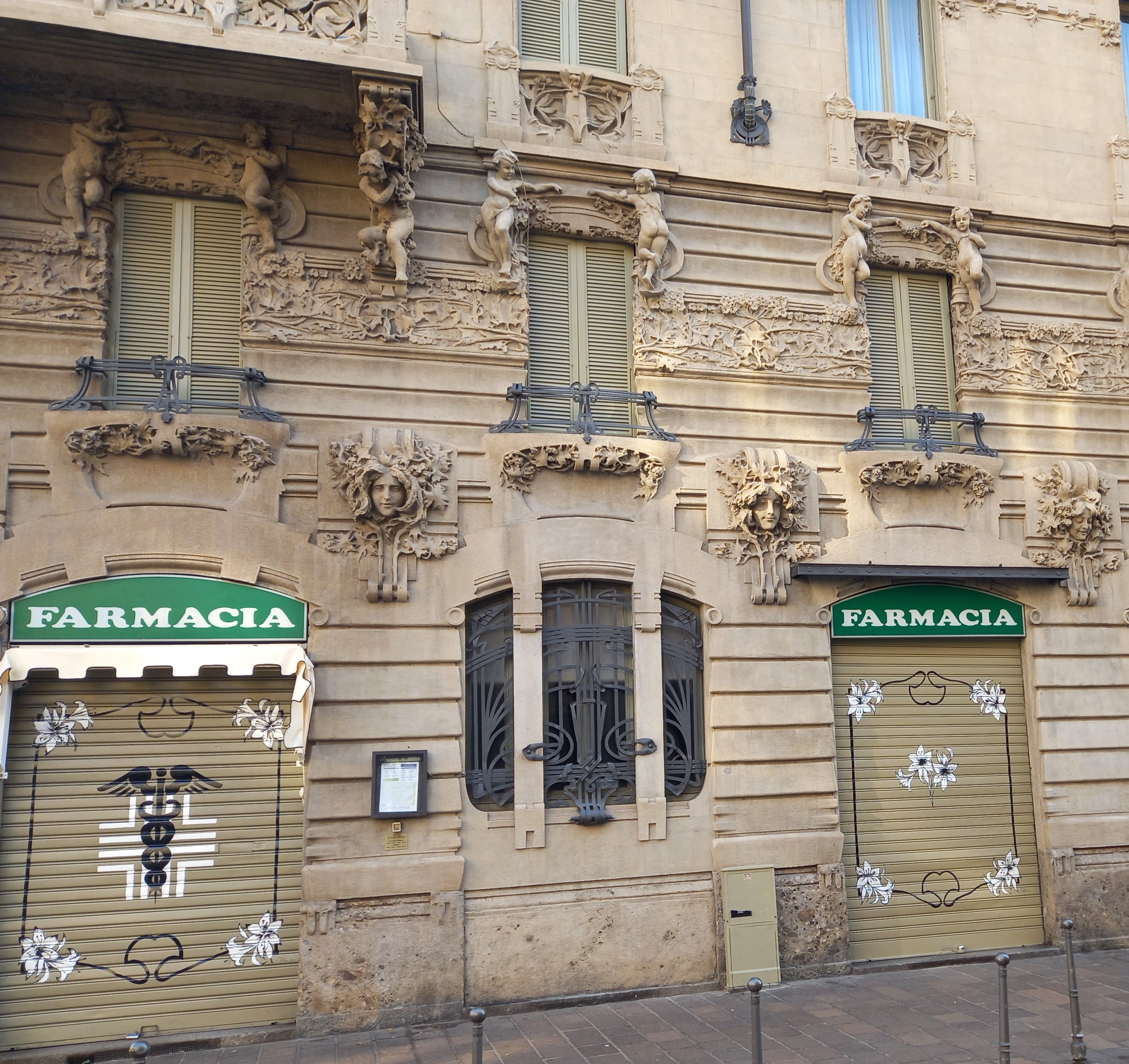
Casa Guazzoni, details on via Melzo

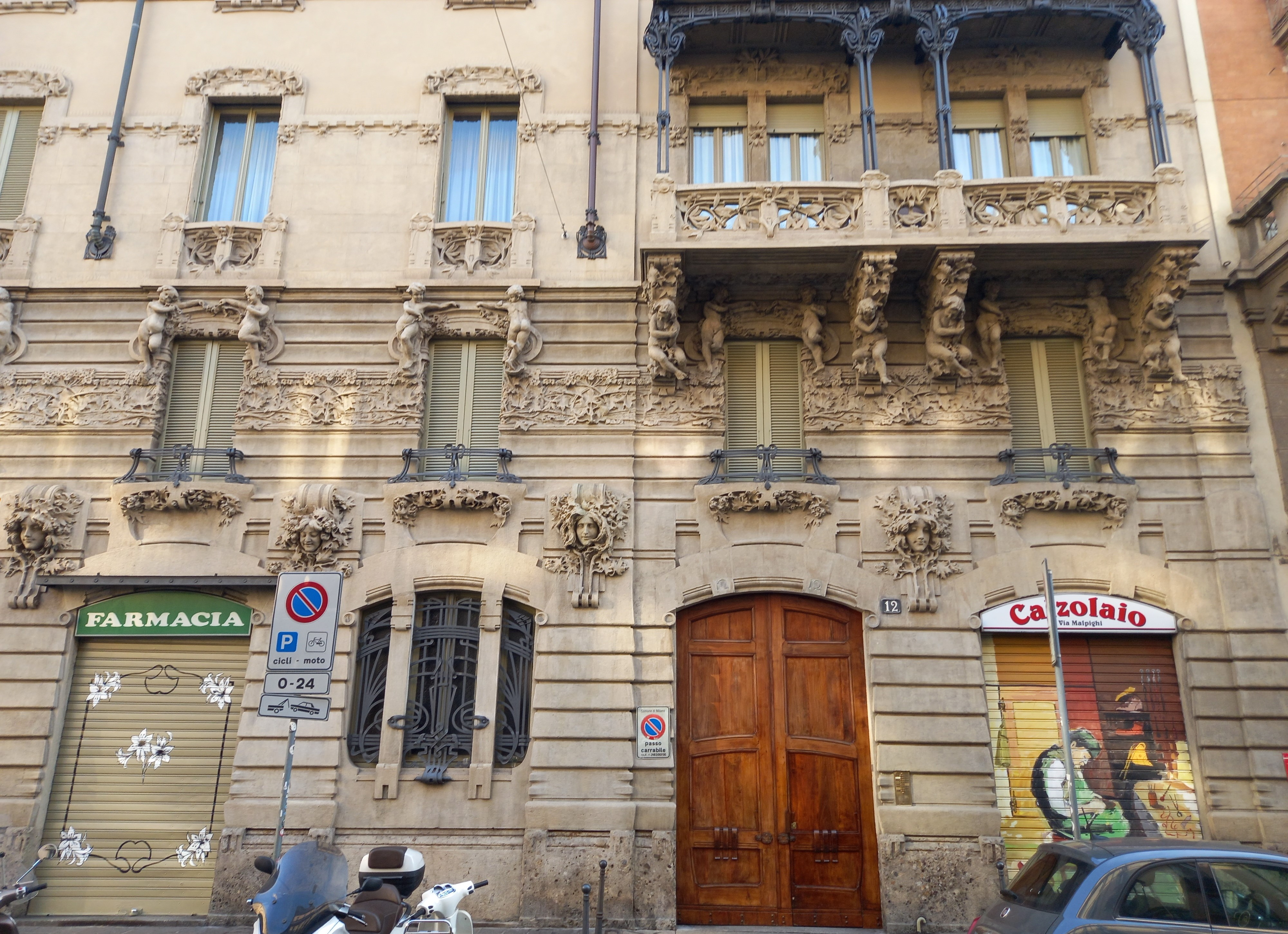
Casa Guazzoni, entrance

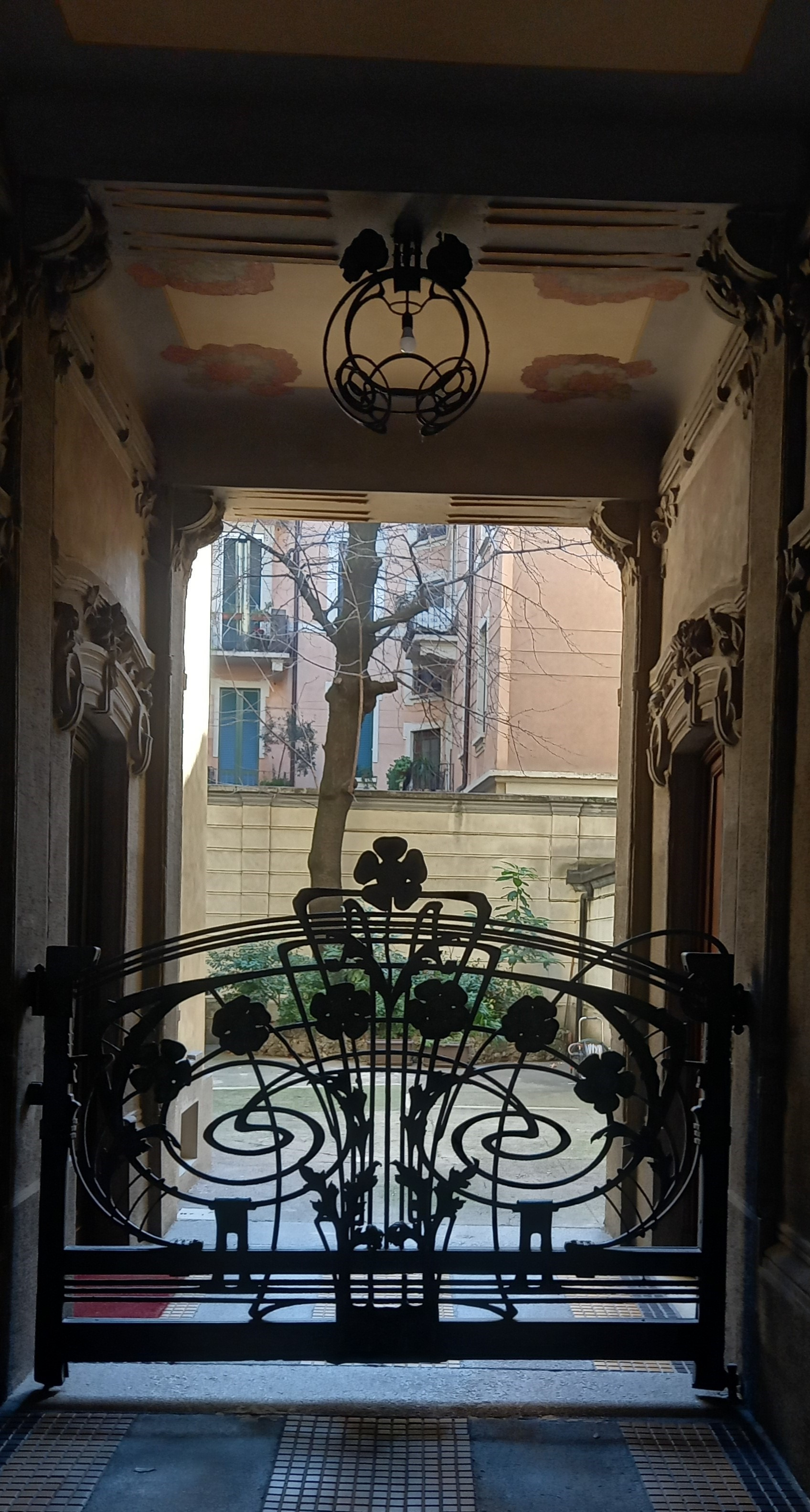
Casa Guazzoni, driveway with Mazzucotelli's fence

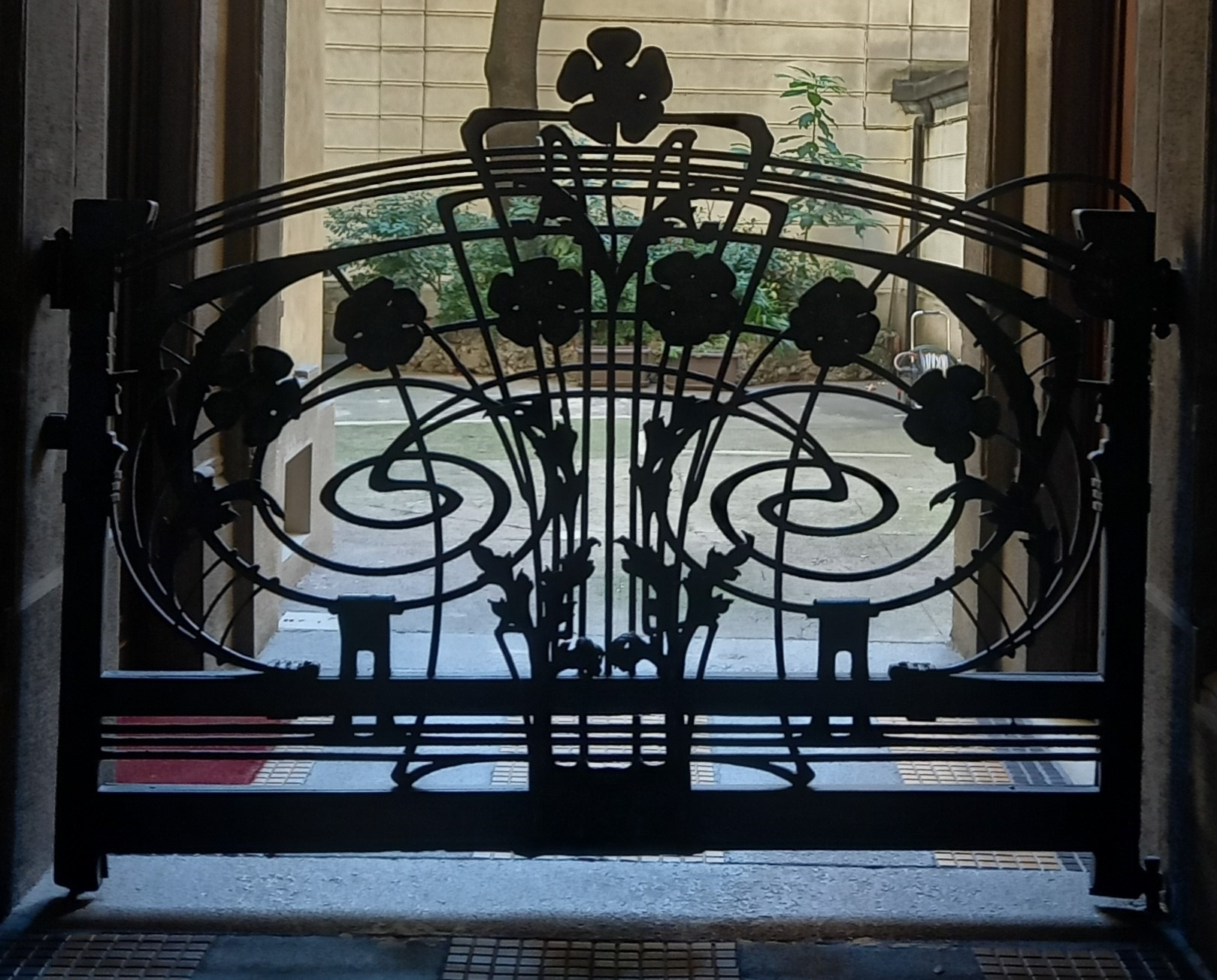
Casa Guazzoni, Mazzucotelli's fence in the driveway

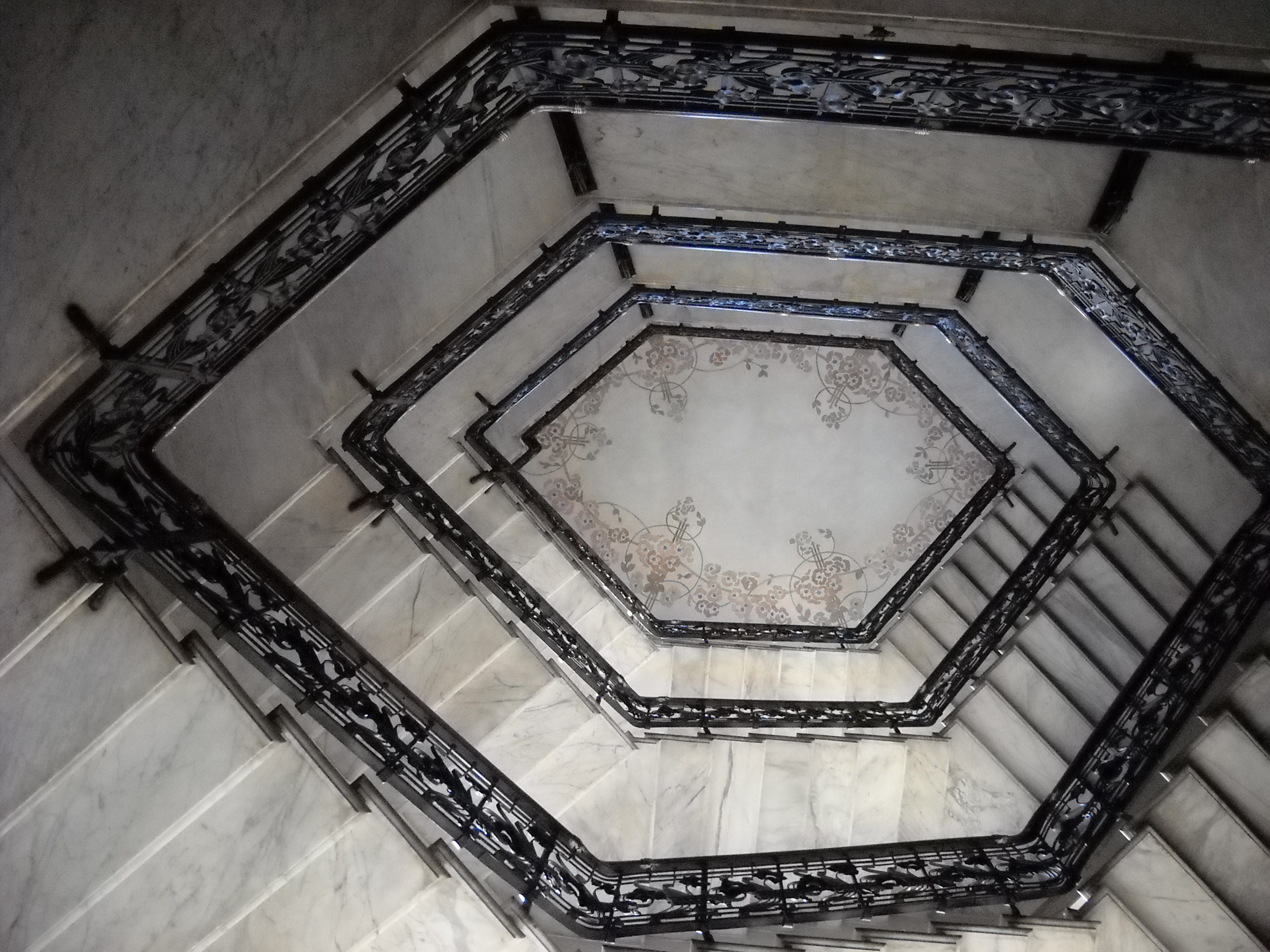
Casa Guazzoni, Mazzucotelli's staircase

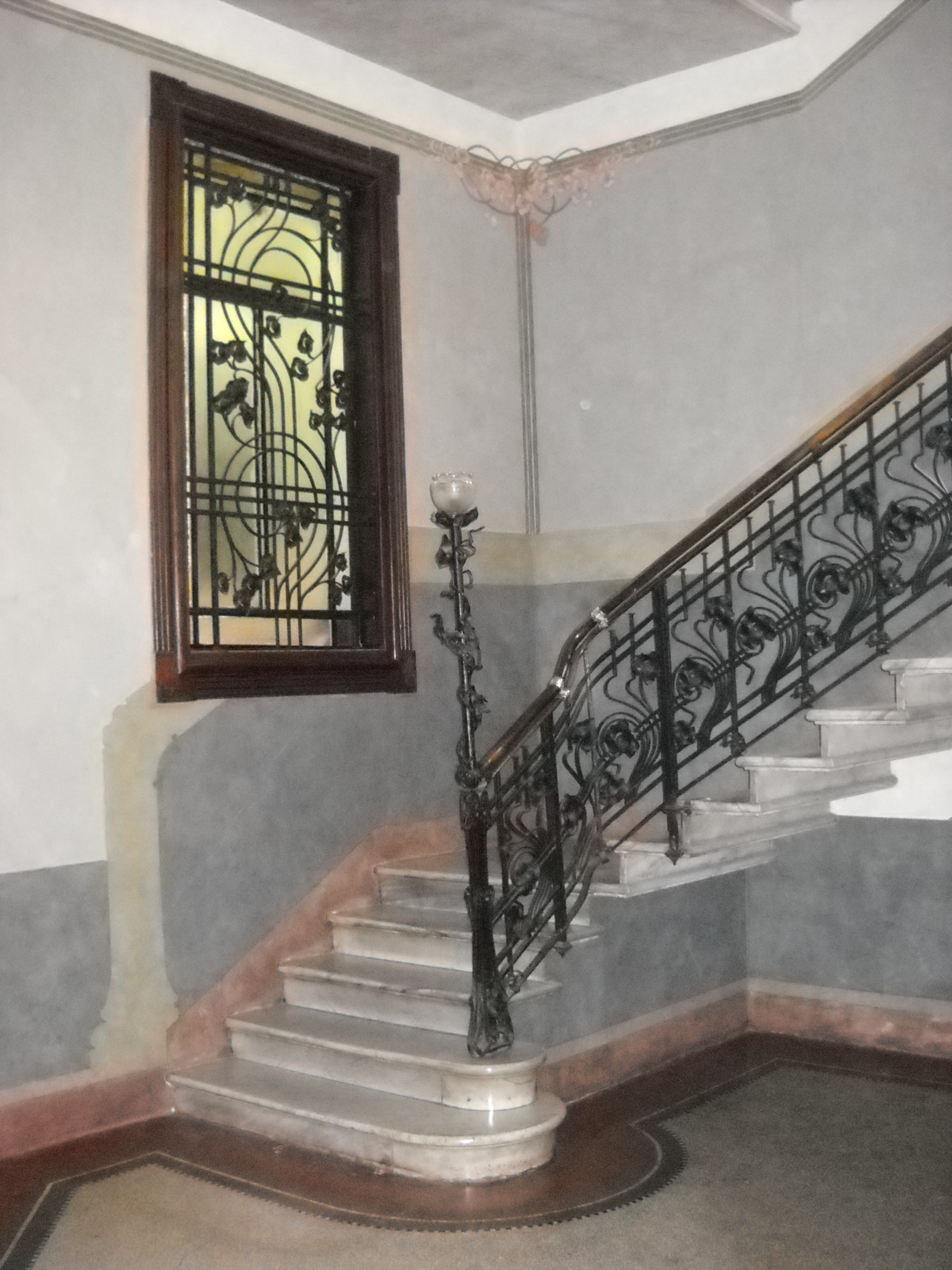
Casa Guazzoni, beginning of the staircase

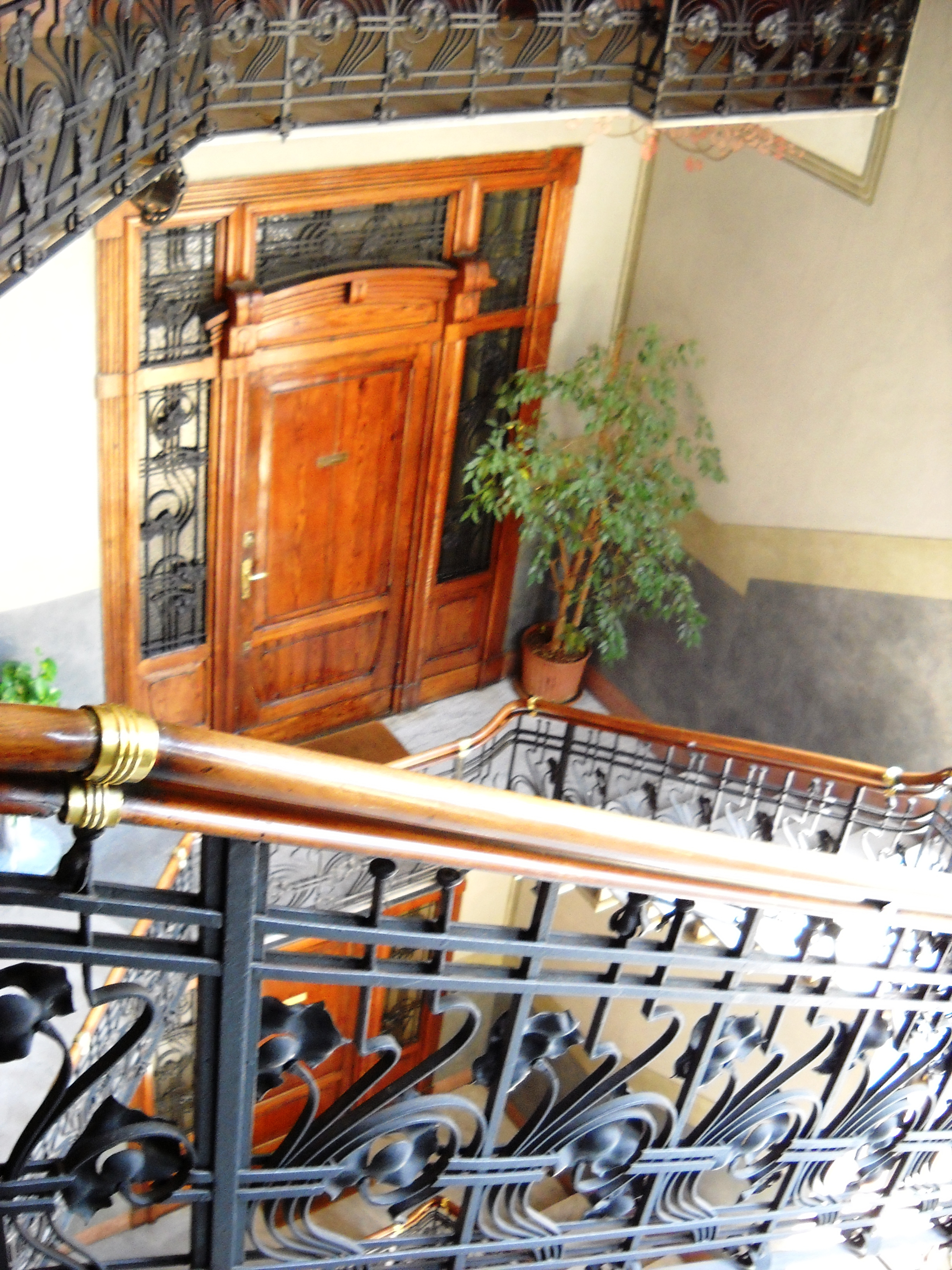
Casa Guazzoni, staircase and door of an apartment

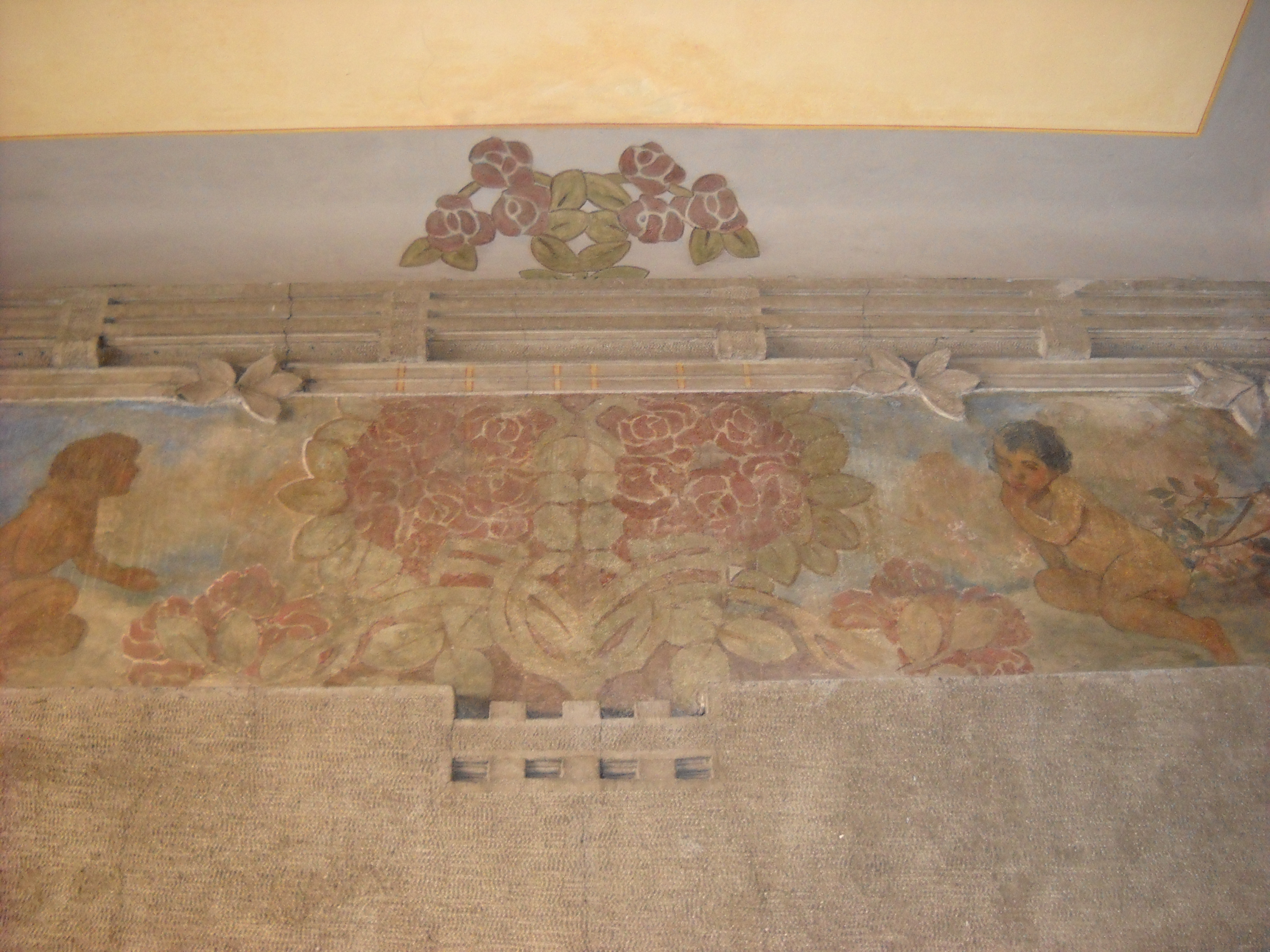
Casa Guazzoni, frescoes of painter Paolo Sala in the driveway

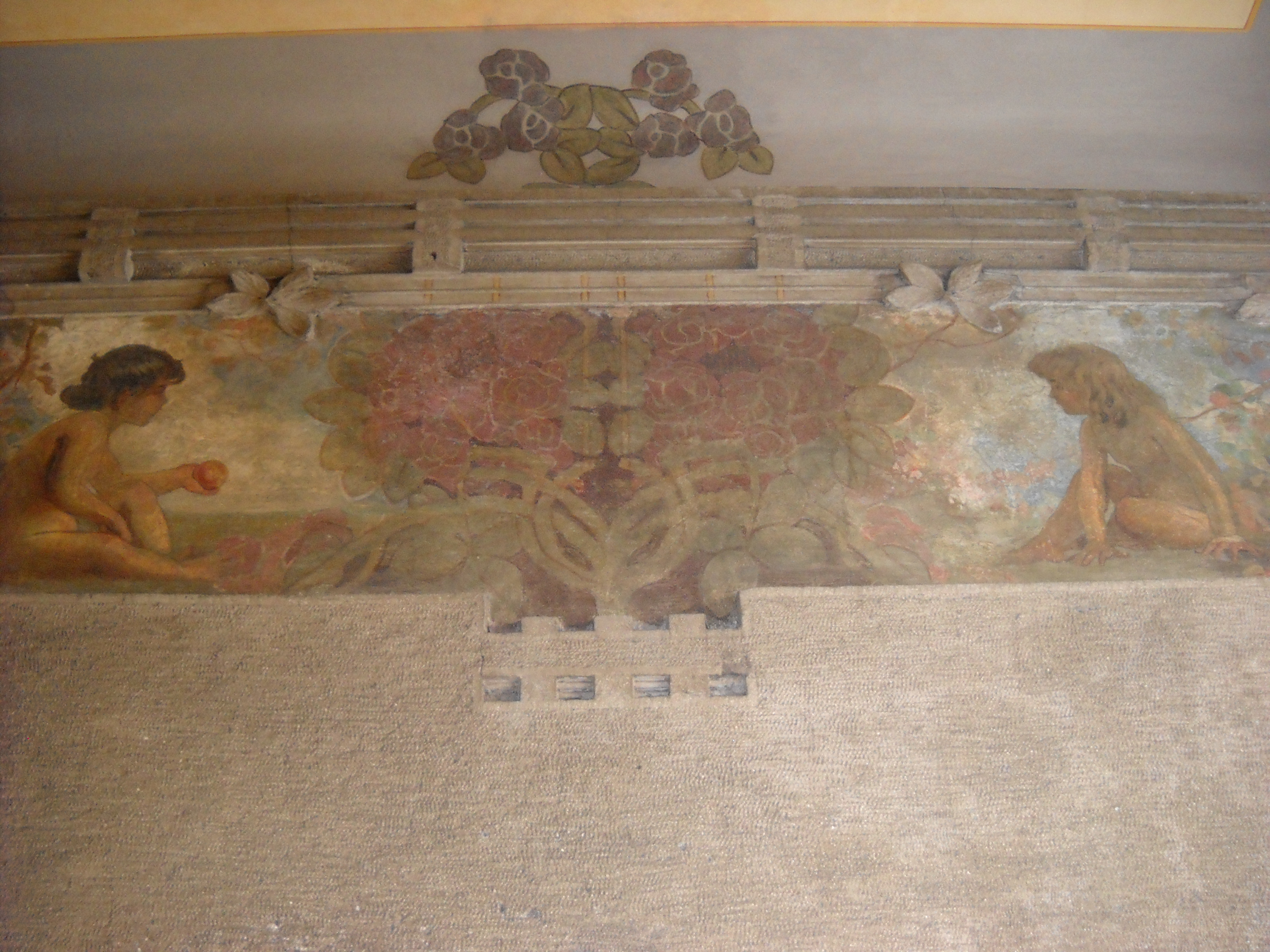
Casa Guazzoni, frescoes of painter Paolo Sala in the driveway

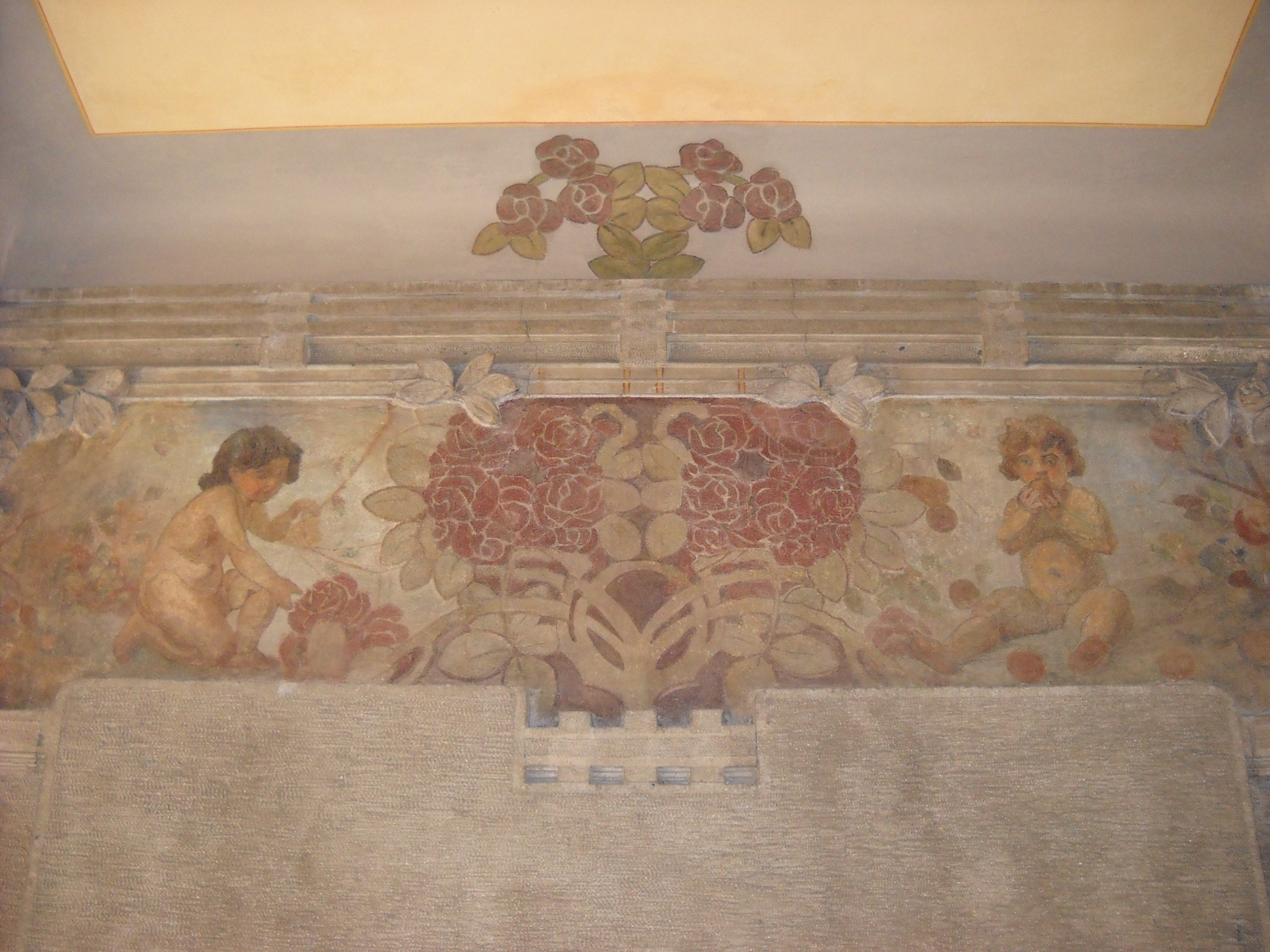
Casa Guazzoni, frescoes of painter Paolo Sala in the driveway

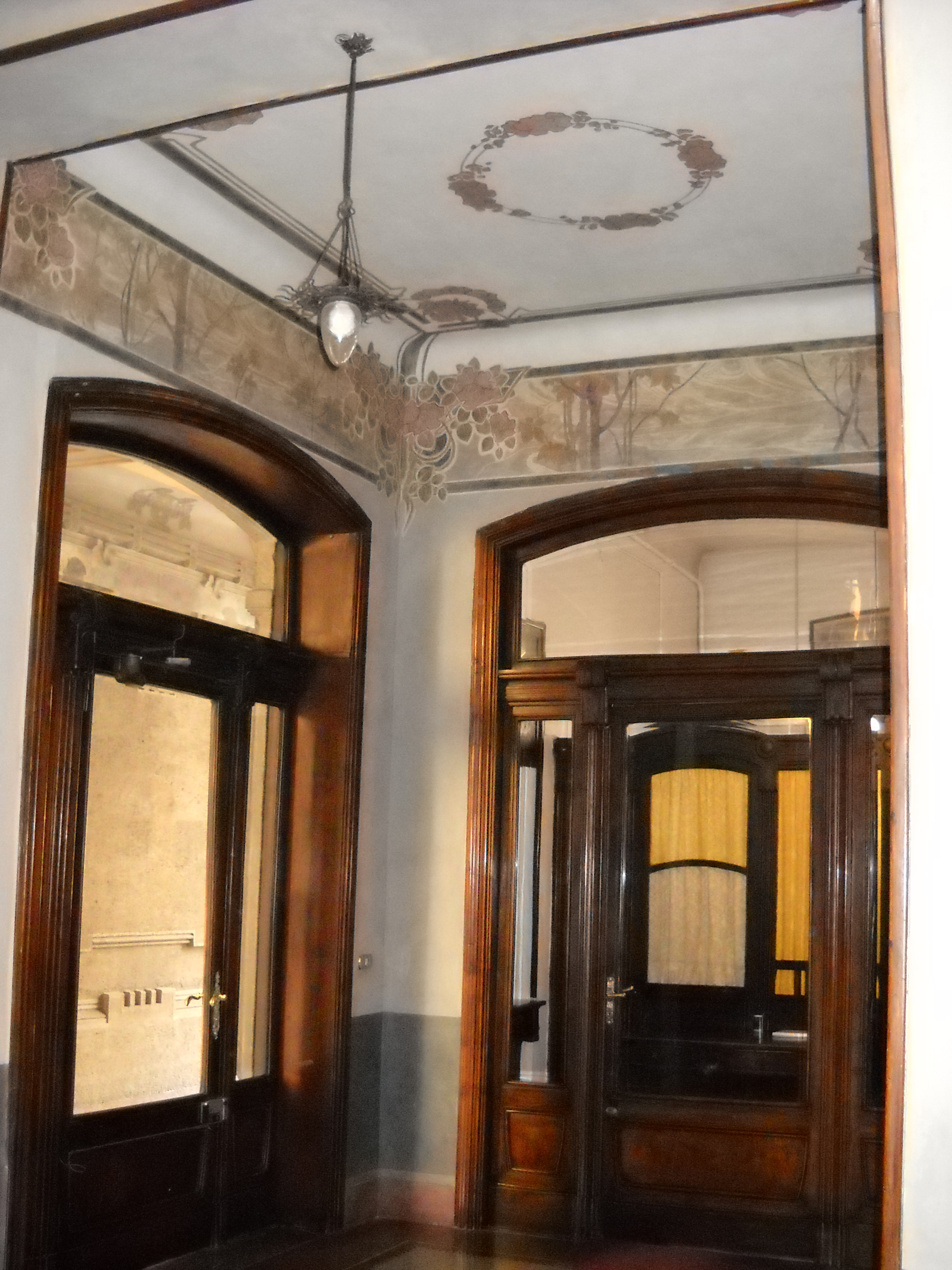
Casa Guazzoni, entrance with decorations

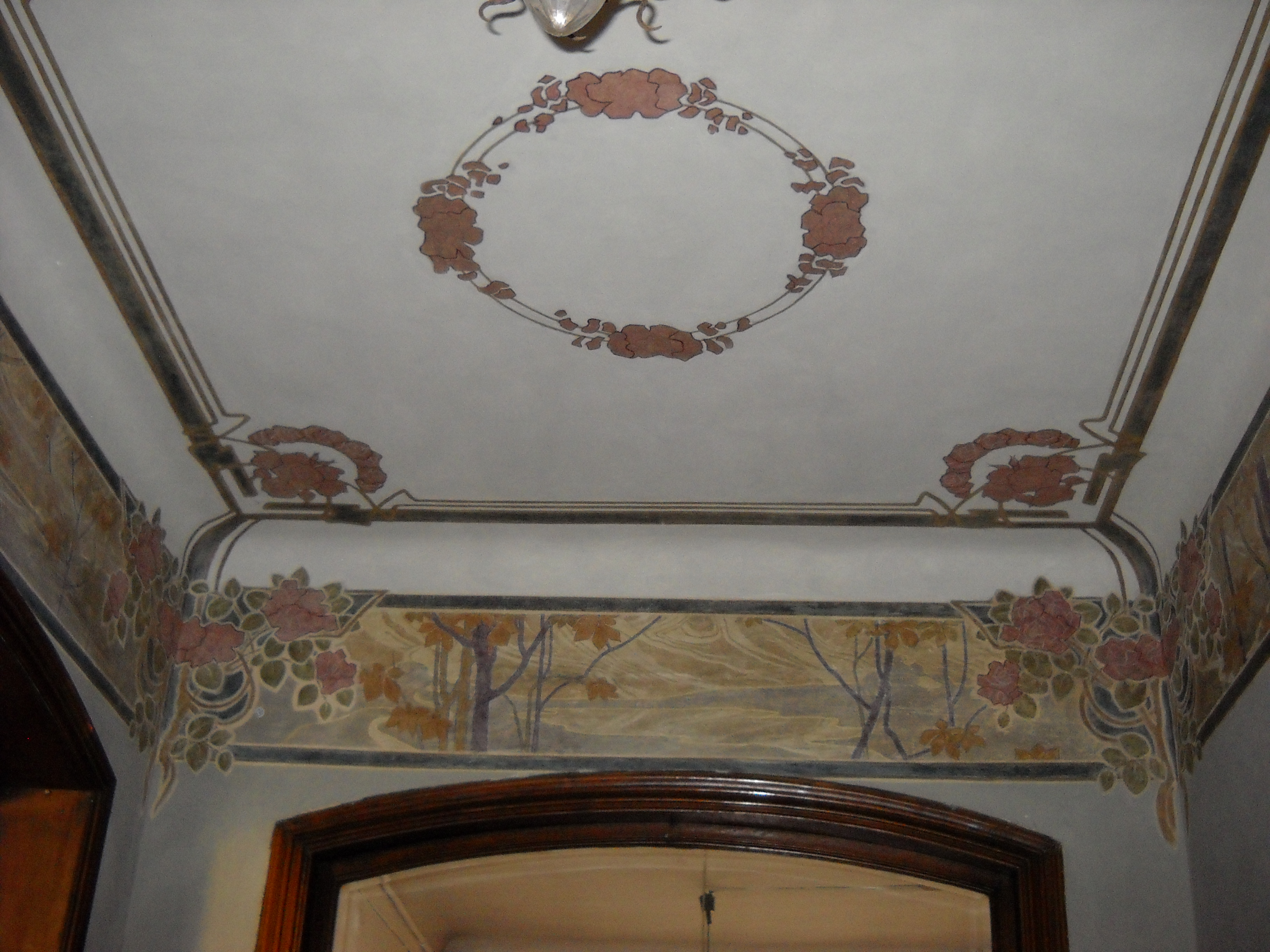
Casa Guazzoni, frescoes in the entrance
