= Lodovico Pogliaghi =

Italian painter (1857–1950)

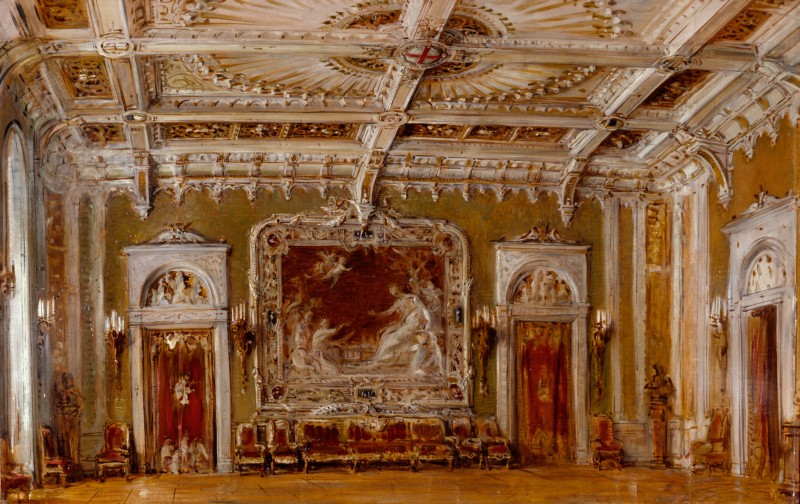
Il salone d'onore della Cassa di Risparmio delle Provincie Lombarde (Fondazione Cariplo)

Lodovico Pogliaghi (Milan, 1857 – S. Maria del Monte, Varese, 1950) was an Italian painter, sculptor and decorator.

== Biography ==
Lodovico Pogliaghi was born to an upper middle class Milanese family. He was enrolled at the Brera Academy at a very young age; and by 1889, he completed his studies. Among his strongest influences there was Giuseppe Bertini, who taught painting.

During the 1880s, he obtained important commissions for the artistic decoration of palazzi belonging to the Milan aristocracy. He also executed religious works, and launched on his career as an illustrator of historical subjects for the Treves publishing house in Milan. He was appointed teacher of decoration at the Brera Academy in 1890, and in 1895, he had won a prestigious competition to design the bronze doors of the Duomo of Milan. One of his works is the Pieta above the entrance to the Expiatory Chapel of Monza.

As a leading exponent of an eclectic academicism orientated towards a restoring to earlier classical styles, he devoted himself to an intense activity that saw him involved in all the major official works of the time, including as consultant for the Department for Antiquities and Fine Arts, and as a restorer. During the 1920s, while continuing to carry out his official duties, he gradually distanced himself from the art world, devoting himself mainly to church commissions. In his maturity, from the mid-1880s onwards, he withdrew to the house-museum on the Sacro Monte di Varese, where he built up his collection of ancient art, shown alongside models of his own works in a striking arrangement with a historical slant.

== Other projects ==
Media related to Lodovico Pogliaghi at Wikimedia Commons
