= Expiatory Chapel of Monza =

Monument and chapel in Lombardy, Italy

Coordinates: 45°35′28″N 9°16′08″E

Expiatory Chapel
- Cappella Espiatoria
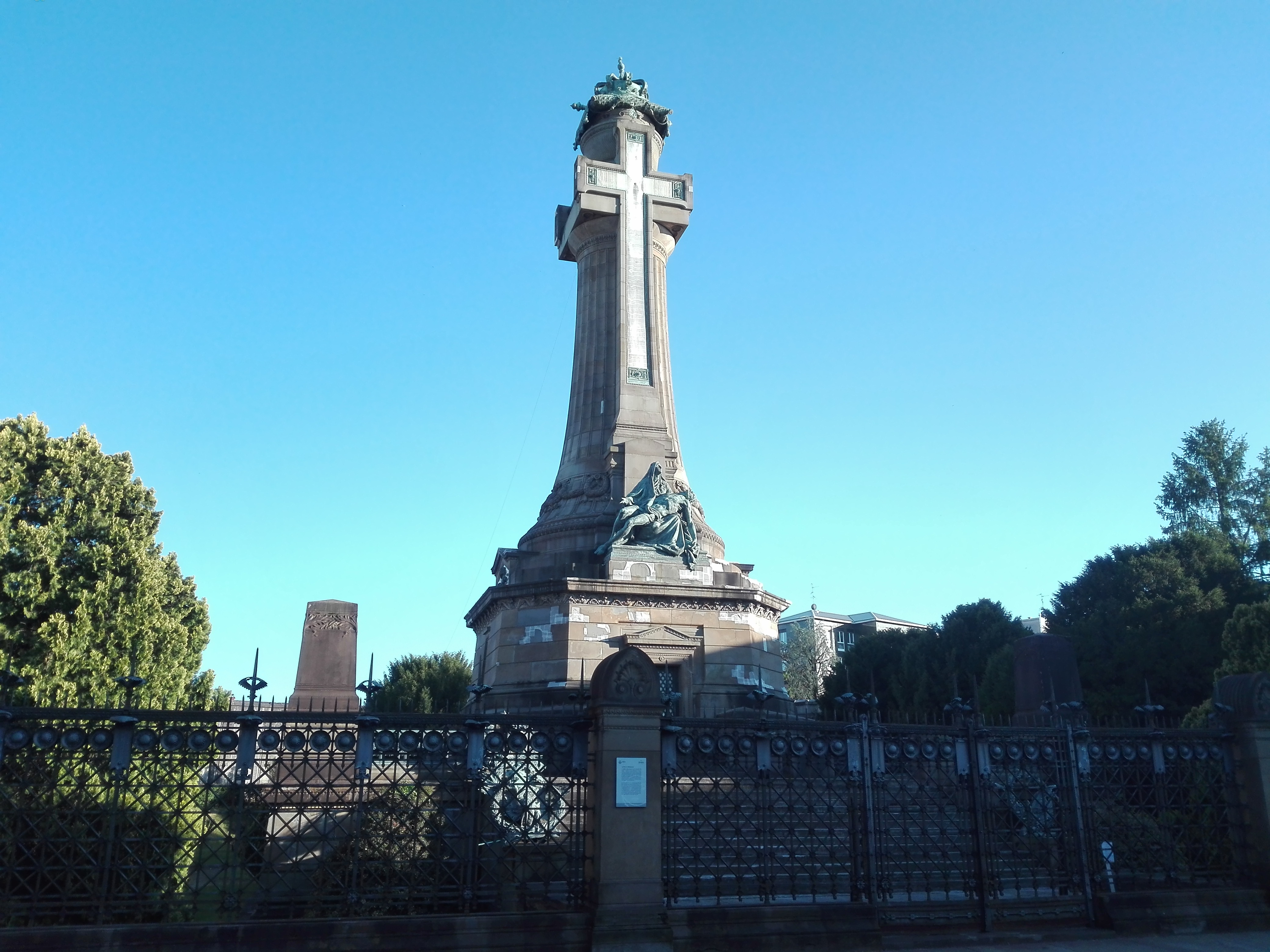
- Expiatory Chapel
- Location: 7/a via Matteo da Campione, Monza
- Country: Italy
- Denomination: Roman Catholic
- Website: Website of the Ministry of Culture

History
- Status: Memorial Chapel
- Founder(s): Victor Emmanuel III, Queen Margherita

Architecture
- Functional status: Museum
- Architectural type: church
- Completed: 1910

The Expiatory Chapel in Monza is a monument-chapel built to atone and commemorate the site at which the king Umberto I of Italy was murdered on July 29, 1900, by the anarchist Gaetano Bresci. It stands near the entrance to the Royal Villa of Monza in Via Matteo da Campione. Umberto's son Vittorio Emanuele III commissioned the aged architect Giuseppe Sacconi, and the work was completed by his pupil Guido Cirilli in 1910. Obelisk-like crosses emerge from a stone chapel, and are surmounted by bronze crown and royal symbols of the House of Savoy. The entrance is surmounted by a Pietà by the sculptor Lodovico Pogliaghi.

There is another such expiatory chapel to atone for a regicide, the Chapelle expiatoire in Paris, built to atone for the execution of Louis XVI.

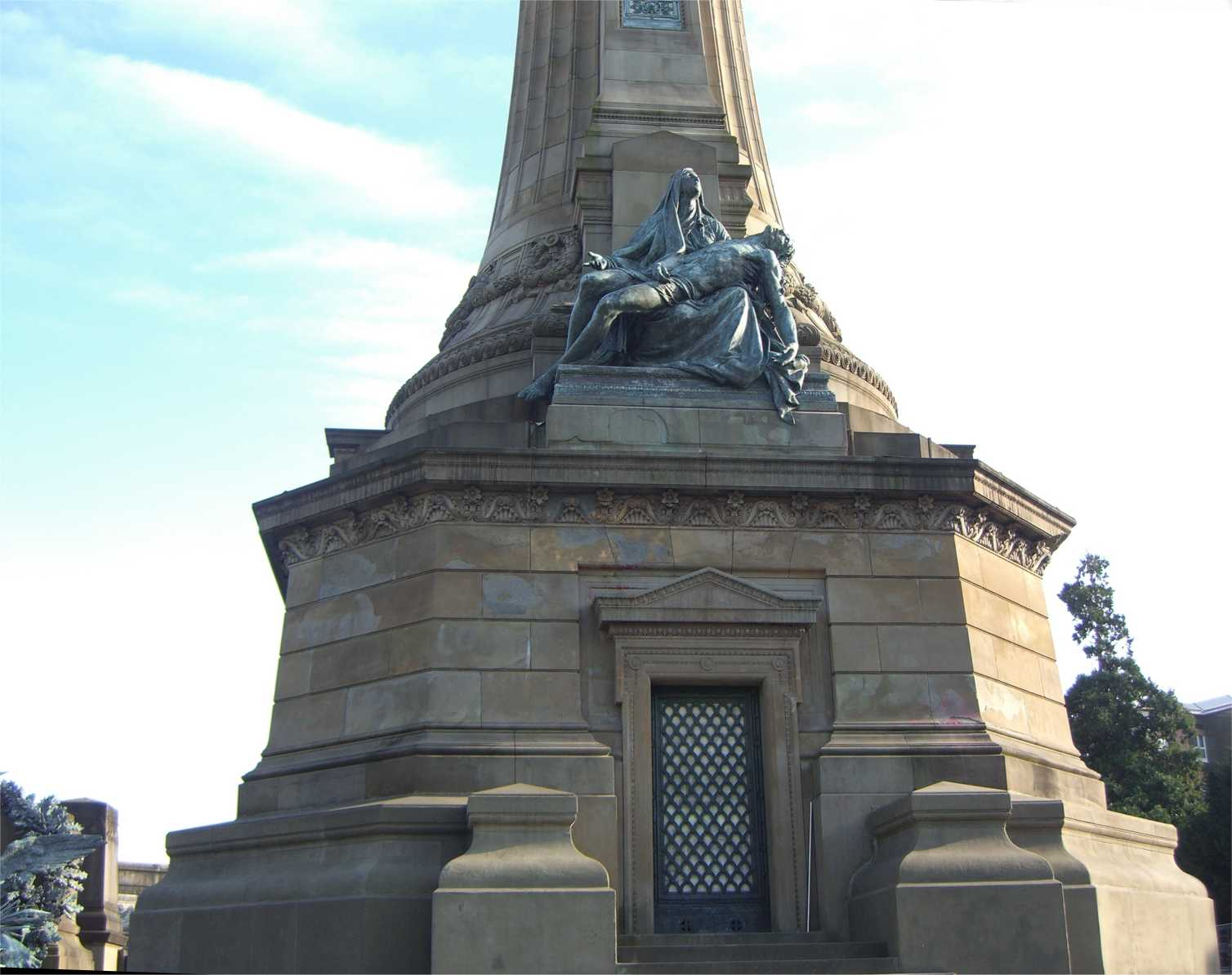
Bronze ‘’Pietà’’ by Ludovico Pogliaghi

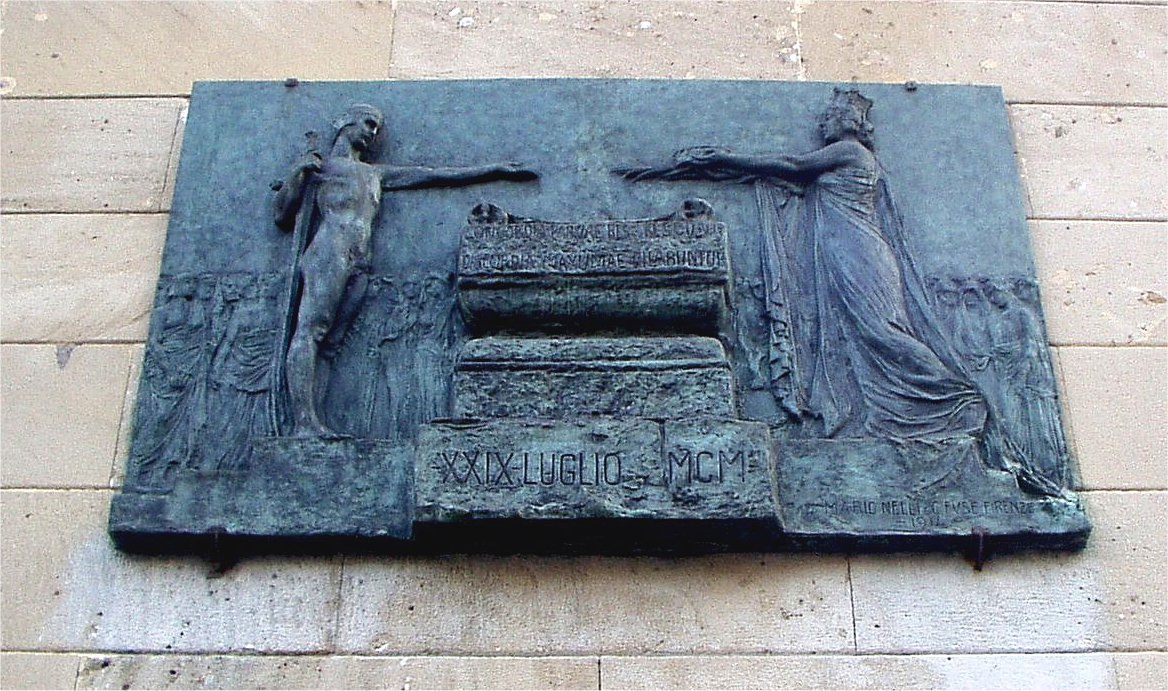
Bronze Targa

== Sources ==
- Information from Italian Wikipedia entry
- Italy including Leghorn, Florence, Ravenna and routes through France, Switzerland, and Austria: handbook for travellers by Karl Baedeker, page 194.
