= Casa Campanini =

Art Nouveau building in Milan, Italy

Coordinates: 45.4657°N 9.2041°E

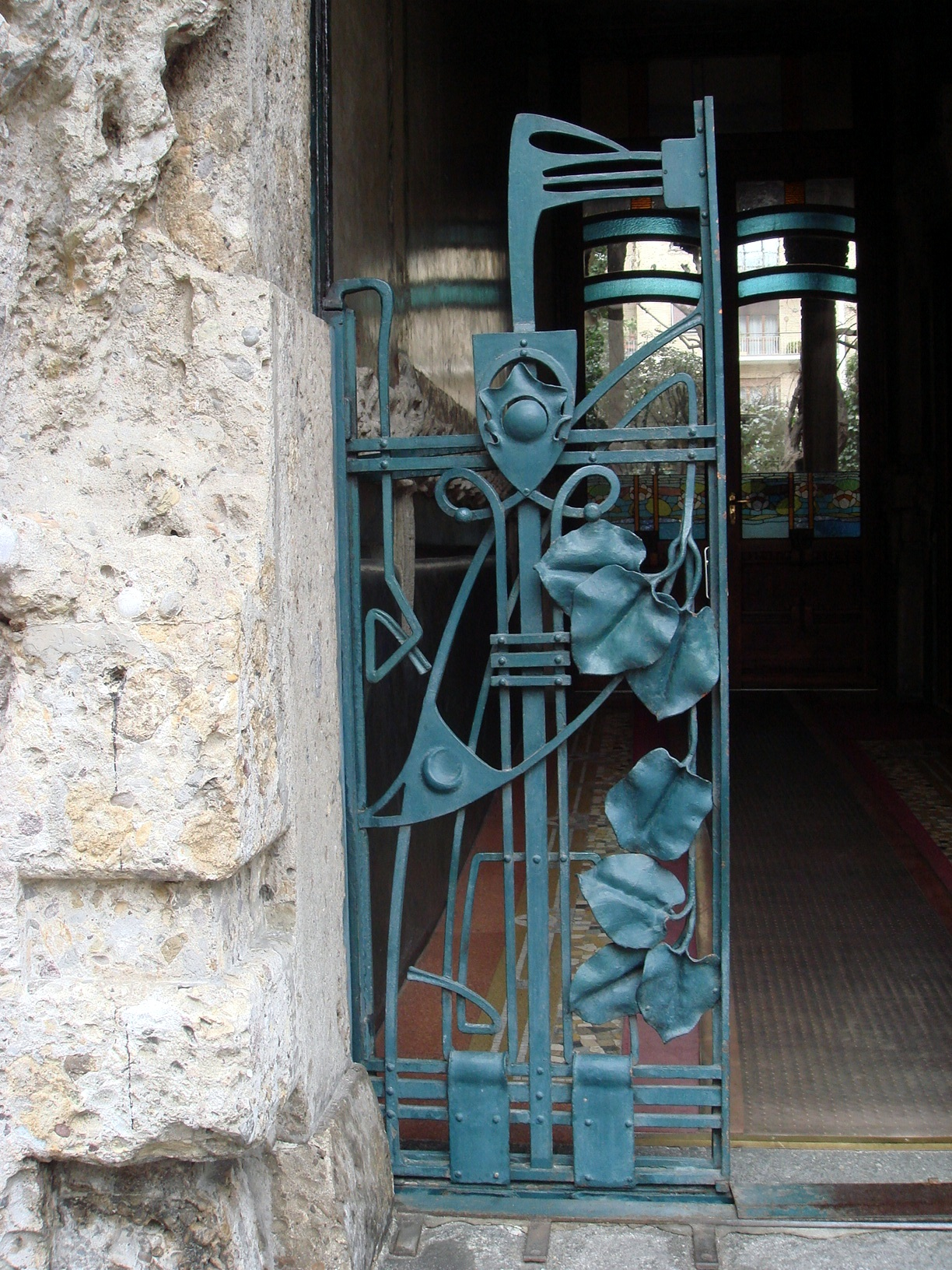
- The entry gate

General information
- Architectural style: Art Nouveau
- Location: 11, Via Bellini, Milan, Italy
- Construction started: 1903
- Construction stopped: 1906

Design and construction
- Architect: Alfredo Campanini

Casa Campanini ("House Campanini") is an Art Nouveau building in Milan, Italy, located at 11, Via Bellini. It was completed between 1903 and 1906 by architect Alfredo Campanini, who later inhabited the building.

A main visual feature of the buildings are the concrete caryatids, located at its main entrance, by the sculptor Michele Vedani, which represent a reference to those of Palazzo Castiglioni (by architect Giuseppe Sommaruga), another Art Nouveau building in Milan. The wrought iron gate, designed by Campanini and created by Alessandro Mazzucotelli, is decorated with flower patterns; similar decorations are also found in the internal lift cage, also in iron.

The interior of the palace has a number of polychrome glasses, friezes, and frescos, all in an Art Nouveau style; some of the inner rooms still house the original furniture and pottery. Decorations, representing cherries, are found on the ceiling of the internal yard.
