= Art Nouveau in Milan =

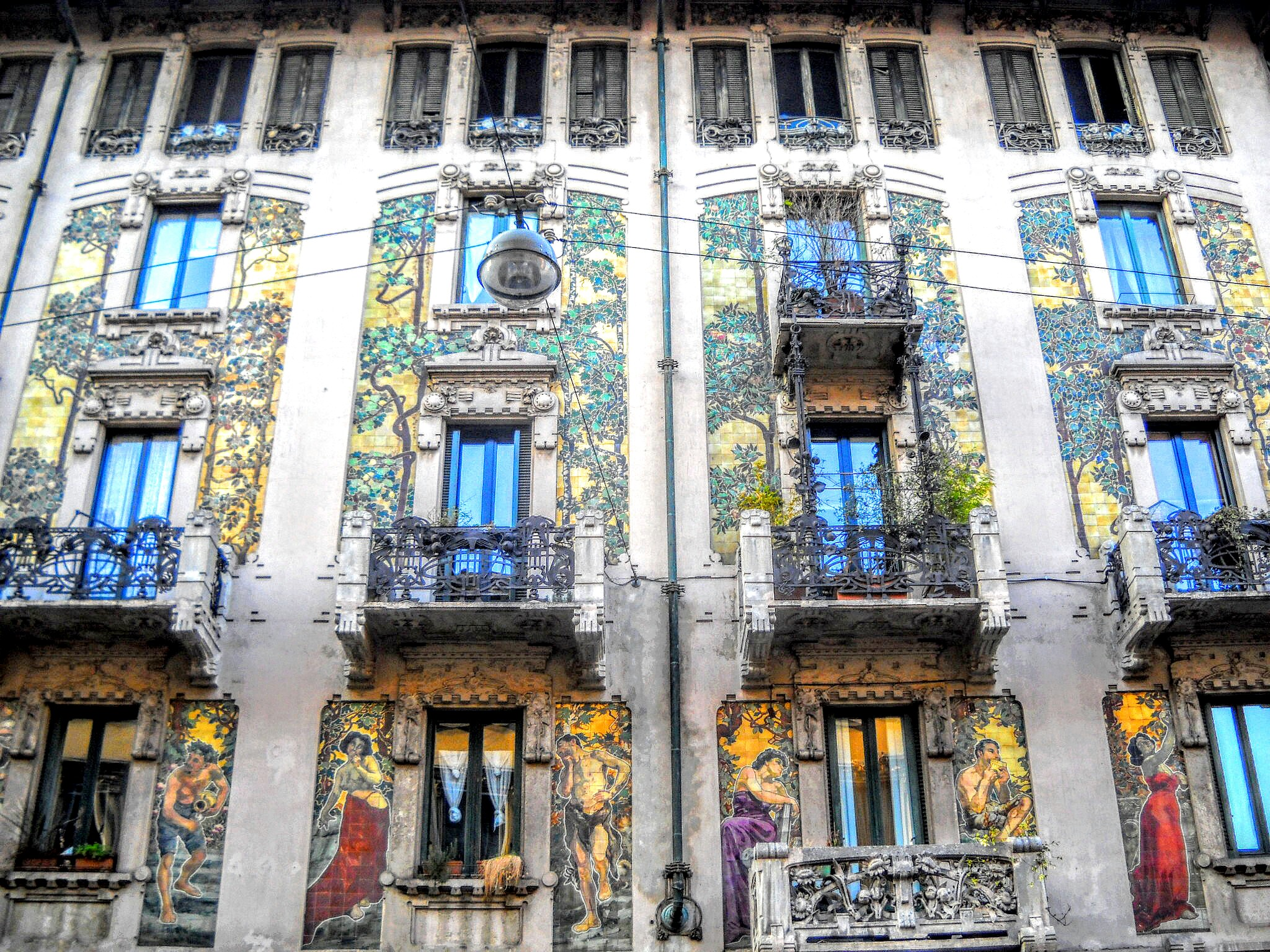
The facade of the Casa Galimberti

Art Nouveau in Milan indicates the spread of such artistic style in the city of Milan between the early years of the 20th century and the outbreak of the First World War. In the Lombard capital, art nouveau, called Stile Liberty in Italian, found—thanks to its close relationship with the rampant industrial bourgeoisie of the time—a fertile ground for its rapid development, during which it oscillated between the influences of French Art Nouveau, German Jugendstil and eclecticism.

At the beginning of the 20th century the Milanese bourgeois class, formed as a result of industrialization and already becoming masters of the social and economic life of the city, found in the new liberty style a "symbol of status" and the occasion to show its power and at the same time underline the clear departure from the noble class and its neoclassical and baroque residences. The Milan International world's fair of 1906 gave further impetus to the development of liberty, as dozens of pavilions and numerous public buildings were built in this style, which decreed the definitive consecration of liberty as the dominant artistic style in the city. Reaching its peak in 1906, Milanese liberty experienced the first contaminations with eclectic architecture, which became stronger and stronger until the years of World War I, after which the liberty survived only with minor influences on minor architecture, while the taste of the industrial bourgeoisie converged spontaneously towards art deco. The Milan Central Station, built from 1924 in a late-eclectic style with Art Deco decorations and modernist influences, is considered by Gualdoni and Melano the conclusion of art nouveau in Milan, which made room for art deco and Italian Novecento.

The Milanese stage of the liberty style was inaugurated with the construction of the Palazzo Castiglioni, completed in 1903 according to the project of Giuseppe Sommaruga, who would become, according to Sacerdoti, the most prominent interpreter of Milanese art nouveau.

Alongside traditional sculpture in marble and stone, art nouveau brought about a great development of sculpture in wrought iron and cement. According to Ogliari and Bagnera, wrought iron found its best interpreter in Alessandro Mazzucotelli, who elevated the working of this material from a simple decorative element to a true art. In addition to sculptural works integrated into architecture or simply ornamental, it was in the funeral monuments of the Monumental Cemetery of Milan that, according to Roiter, the most important laboratory of art nouveau sculpture developed, which, as in the case of architecture, merged in a more or less accentuated way with eclectic and art deco themes.

== Historical framework and general characteristics ==
After the National Exhibition of 1881, twenty years after the Italian Unification, the city of Milan was definitively established as the main Italian industrial center. The city saw the formation of a new emerging bourgeois class related to industry and commerce, made up of master builders, landowners and entrepreneurs who within a few decades would equal in prosperity and importance the city's old nobility.

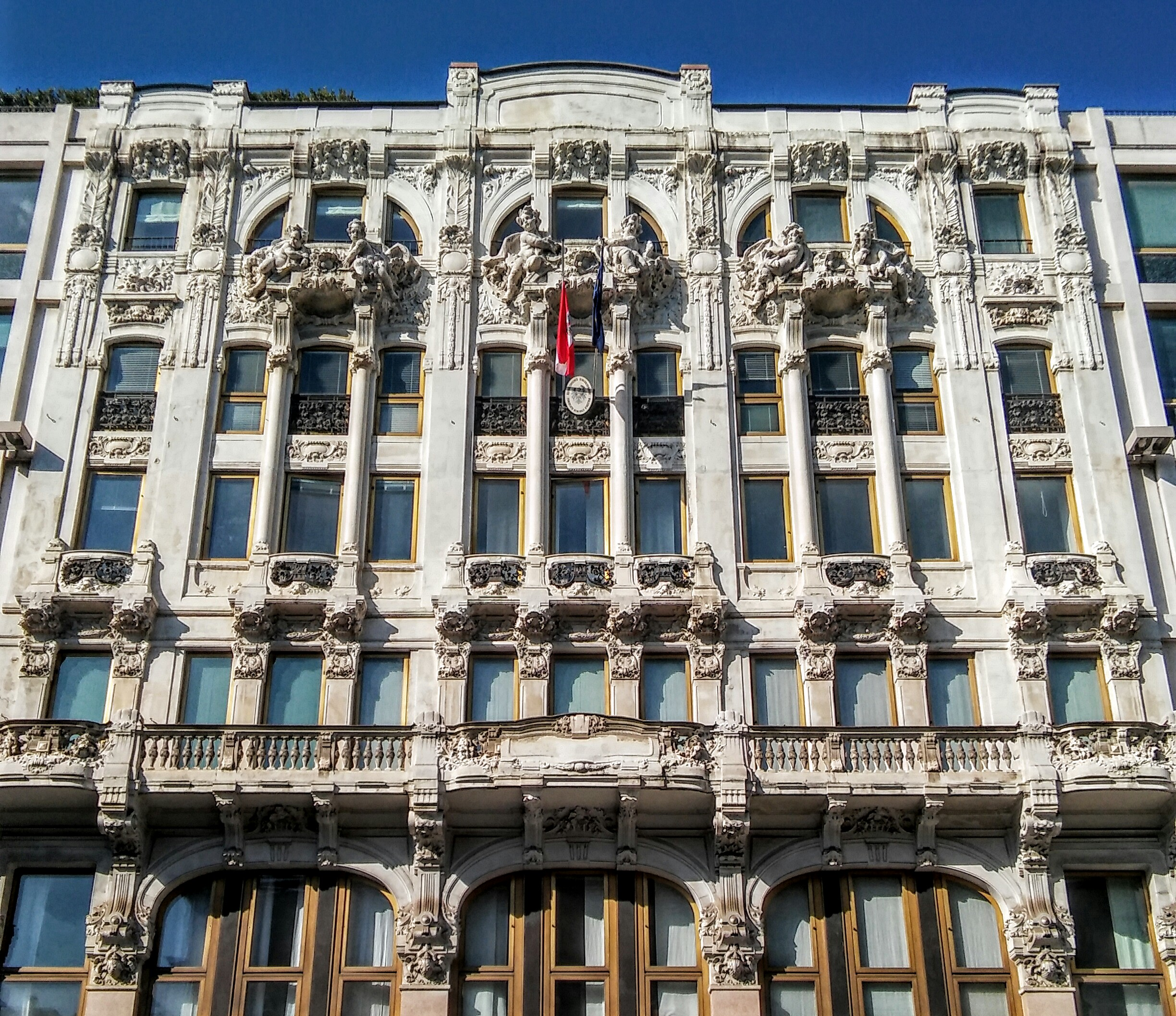
Decoration of the former Hotel Trianon

At the beginning of the 20th century the bourgeois class, by now master of the social and economic life of the city, found in the liberty style, a novelty coming from France and introduced in Italy at Palermo and the Turin Exhibition of 1902, the "symbol of its status" and the occasion to show its power and at the same time underline the clear distance from the noble class and its neoclassical and baroque residences. This almost exclusive relationship between the new ruling class and the new architectural style, as well as the move away from the architectural models of the "old" aristocratic class, seem evident when one notes that, while the new bourgeoisie elevated residences à la mode following the new dictates of liberty, the more conservative commissions related to the old financial and ecclesiastical world—among which the new bank headquarters in the Piazza Cordusio area stand out—remained attached to the already decadent eclectic style, in vogue in the 19th century.

The Milan Universal Exposition of 1906 gave further impetus to the development of liberty, as dozens of pavilions were built in this style at the exposition site and numerous public buildings, thus decreeing the definitive consecration of liberty as the dominant artistic style in the city. Although very articulated and differentiated, the Milanese art nouveau experience shows as a whole some common points and novelties: the decoration of buildings in wrought iron or decorative cement, with floral or animal themes is recurrent; at the structural level the use of reinforced concrete stands out. It is common the use of painting on the walls of the buildings, often with ceramic tiles, and the caryatids and hermas taken from the architecture of the Milanese noble palaces. However, despite the very rich display of applied arts liberty developed in the city, architecture and interior decoration found it difficult to conform to the new style and except for a few episodes were dominated by late-eclectic styles.

Reaching its peak in 1906, Milanese liberty experienced the first contaminations with eclectic architecture, which became stronger and stronger until the years of the First World War, after which liberty survived only with minor influences on minor architecture, while the taste of the industrial bourgeoisie converged spontaneously towards art déco.

== Private architecture ==
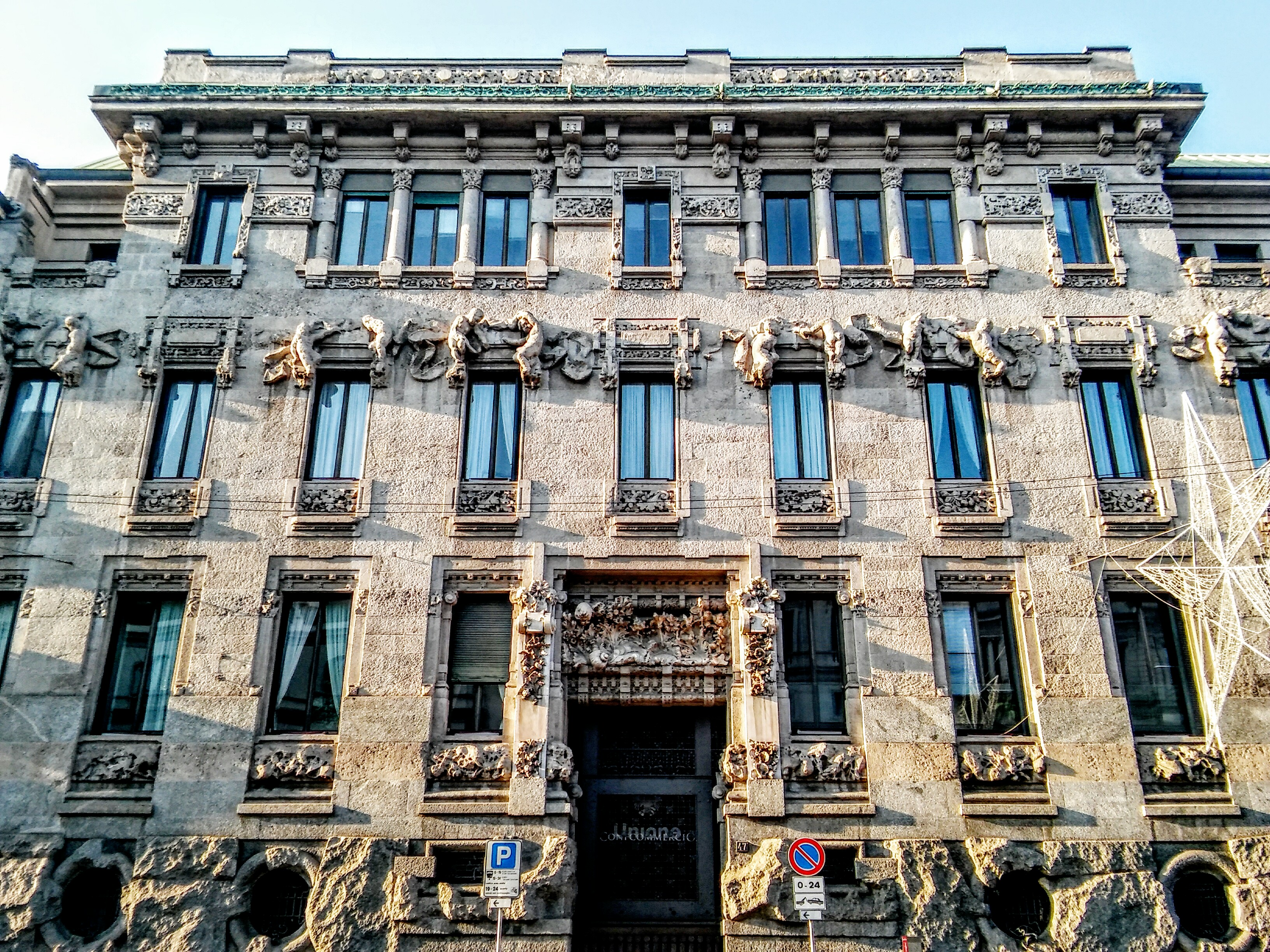
Palazzo Castiglioni

The Milanese stage of the liberty style was inaugurated with the construction of the Palazzo Castiglioni, completed in 1903 according to the project of Giuseppe Sommaruga, who would become, according to Sacerdoti, the most prominent interpreter of Milanese art nouveau. The building, decorated with cement sculptures of floral theme and wrought iron compositions typical of the new style, distances itself from art nouveau by its monumental forms and the use of classical elements such as the putti, taken from the nearby noble palaces, where the neoclassical style dominates. The palace, considered by Lopez, Susani and Roiter one of the best examples of Italian art nouveau and built in one of the most elegant streets of Milan, remarked even more clearly the status of the new bourgeois class and introduced with force in the city the use of cement as a sculptural element. The "breaking signal" thrown to the old ruling class was even more intense due to the presence on both sides of the entrance of two statues representing two naked women in very daring poses, which caused a great scandal, to the point that the palace was colloquially renamed by the Milanese la ca' di ciapp (the "house of the buttocks") in reference to the subsequent nudity of the two women and the architect was forced to remove them and move them to the then peripheral Villa Faccanoni, another example of a liberty, suburban villa also designed by Sommaruga, in which the putti sculptures and the motif of the windows divided by columns on the top floor of Palazzo Castiglioni were reproduced.

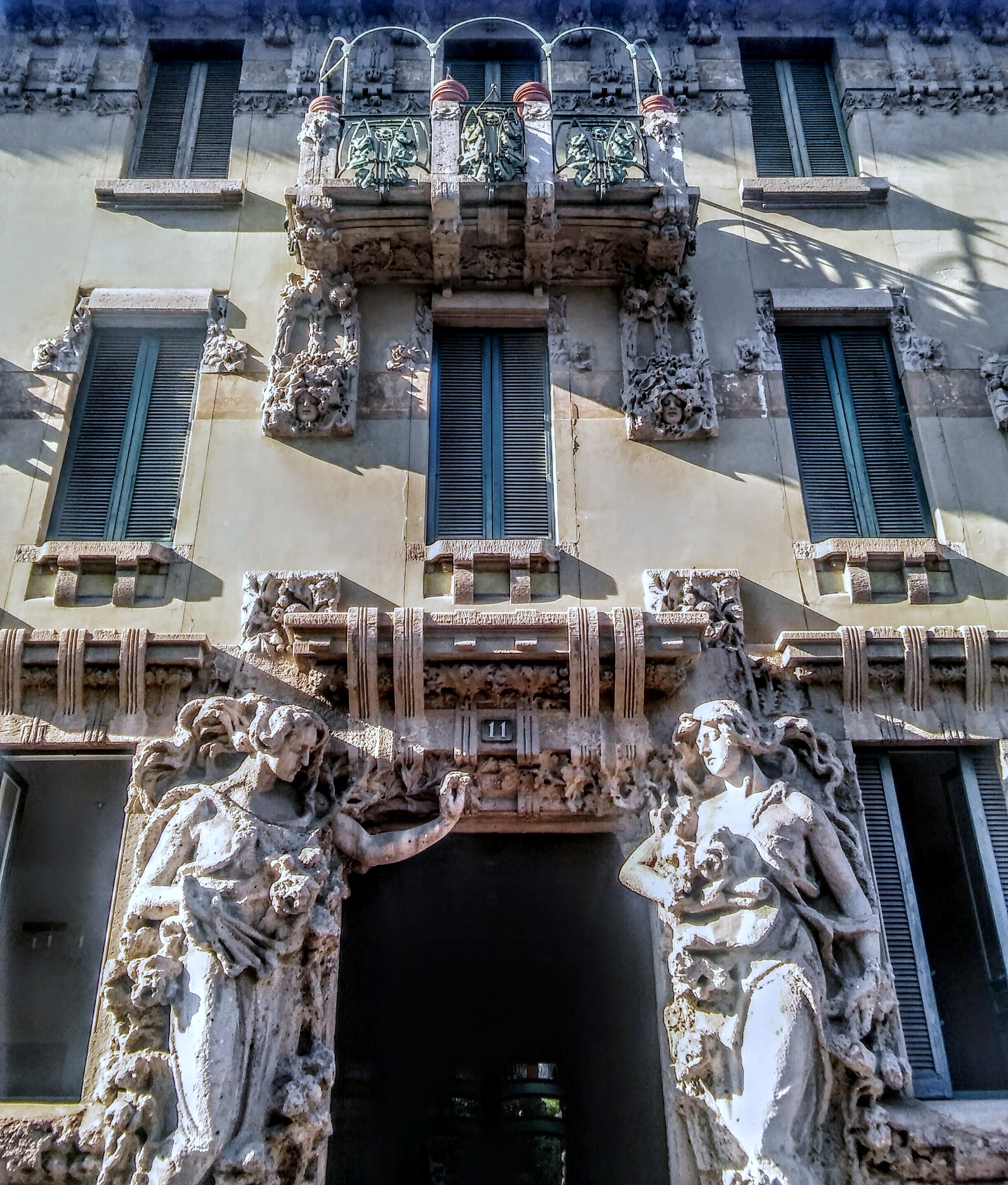
The facade of Casa Campanini

According to Sacerdoti, another leading interpreter of Milanese art nouveau was Giovanni Battista Bossi, who has in the Casa Galimberti his most famous work. The facade of this building presents a complex decoration with ceramic tiles painted with human forms and plant elements that show elaborate chromatic contrasts. Also noteworthy are the decorated balconies made of cement and the wrought iron a baldaquino balconies. A few meters away is the Casa Guazzoni, also by Bossi, which despite retaining the typically floral style of the facade presents a decoration completely centered on sculpture with elaborate putti devices, female figures and plant forms also in cement and wrought iron with overlapping balconies. Bossi lastly designed the Casa Alessio, more akin to the Viennese Secession style with its rigid geometries and the vertical strip in correspondence with the entrance.

A rare example of self-enclosure was the Casa Campanini, which the architect and real estate entrepreneur Alfredo Campanini designed as his own residence in 1904. The composition of the facade shows at a general level a strong inspiration in the work of Sommaruga, in particular by the sculptures of female figures at the entrance, explicit homage to the portal of Palazzo Castiglioni. The classic wooden entrance gate is replaced here by a wrought iron gate with plant motifs, the same motif of the balconies, made by Alessandro Mazzucotelli: other wrought iron decorative elements are also his, which, together with the frescoes and stained glass windows, constitute a typically modernist interior decoration, without any trace of eclectic influences, something uncommon in many other contemporary buildings in the city.

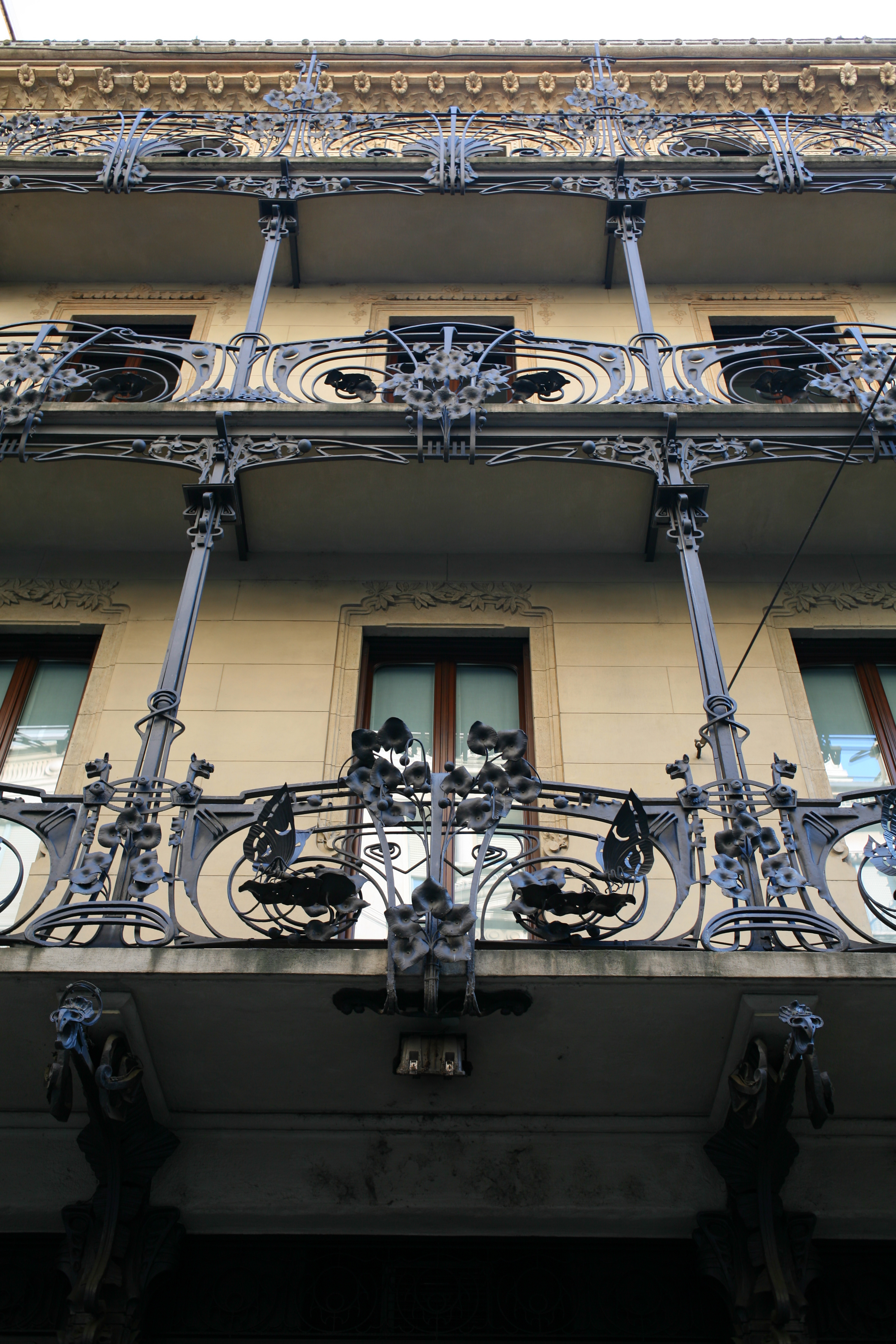
Casa Ferrario

On the fringe of the logic of creation of new residential areas dedicated to the bourgeois class, the Casa Ferrario was built from 1902 according to the project of Ernesto Pirovano in Via Spadari, one of the most central and oldest streets of Milan. The notoriety of this building, still substantially traditional in design and relatively sober in the other elements, is due to the wrought iron decorations of the overlapping balconies with spiral motifs and floral decoration with corbels shaped like griffin also made by Mazzucotelli, considered by Sacerdoti one of the greatest wrought iron artists in Italy.

In contrast to the floral branch of the Milanese liberty led by Sommaruga, we can cite the Casa Donzelli by Ulisse Stacchini, in which, despite the clear influences of Sommaruga, a composition with austere lines typical of the art nouveau of the German area can be appreciated, and the Casa Agostoni, in which some typical liberty elements such as natural themes and sculpture in cement join a typically decimononic facade configuration and classical elements such as bas-reliefs.

Alongside housing for the upper middle class, a large number of liberty style dwellings were built in Milan for the small and middle bourgeoisie. The construction of these buildings, not being able to dispose of high investments, used mass-produced ceramic decorations and industrial cement statues, simpler wrought iron decorations and a particular attention to the reduction of common spaces not strictly necessary. Examples of this type of commissions are the Casa Dugnani and the Casa Biraghi, in which stand out the maiolicas with floral theme mass-produced by Richard Ginori.

A particular branch of bourgeois architecture are the buildings dedicated to mixed use, as a residential place and for industrial or commercial activity. One can cite, for example, the Casa Laugier, built for the valdostana family. Laugier, to house, in addition to housing, the pharmacy of the family. The building, which was designed by the architect Antonio Tagliaferri in forms inspired by Viennese art nouveau, resorts to all the typical decorations of Italian art nouveau such as panels, cement and wrought iron to compose forms derived from the animal and vegetable kingdom, although in a balanced way. The decoration, however, is more sober and resorts to clay bricks typical of the Lombard Renaissance that predominates in the street.

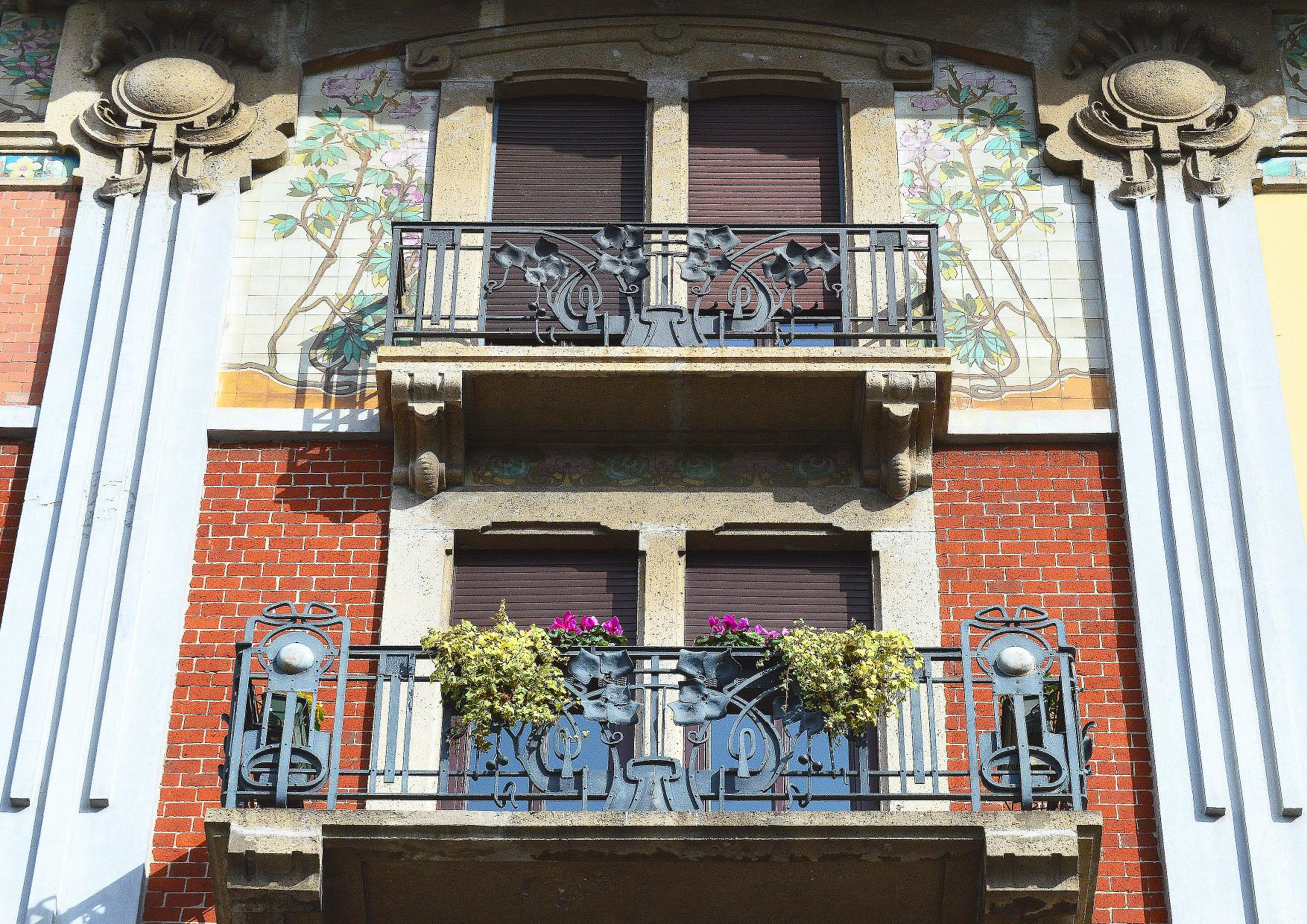
Casa Laugier decoration detail

Of purely commercial use were the Magazzini Contratti, built in 1903 according to the project of Luigi Broggi: the use of the then innovative reinforced concrete allowed the realization of the load-bearing structure with simple columns and, consequently, allowed the wide windows with wrought iron railings that characterize the building. Very similar are the Magazzini Bonomi, also with large windows, wrought iron balconies and columns in cast iron. In addition to the commercial typology are also found buildings formerly dedicated to factory: Palazzo della Gondrand and the former Palazzo della Cusini by Cesare Mazzocchi, in which the liberty lines and the windows of the Magazzini Contratti are reproposed in a more sober way to combine the aesthetic requirements with those of cost containment of an industrial building.

Finally, some works dedicated to other tertiary activities can be cited: according to López, Susani and Casero, one of the most remarkable examples is the facade of the former Trianon Hotel, characterized by very elaborate decorations with windows and putti that hint at important neo-baroque influences, a style later taken up again in Alfredo Campanini's Casa Tosi. Finally, Lopez and Susani highlight the former Dumont Cinema, made with floral decorations, which was one of the first buildings in Italy specifically designed to house a cinema.

== Popular and public architecture and the liberty minore ==
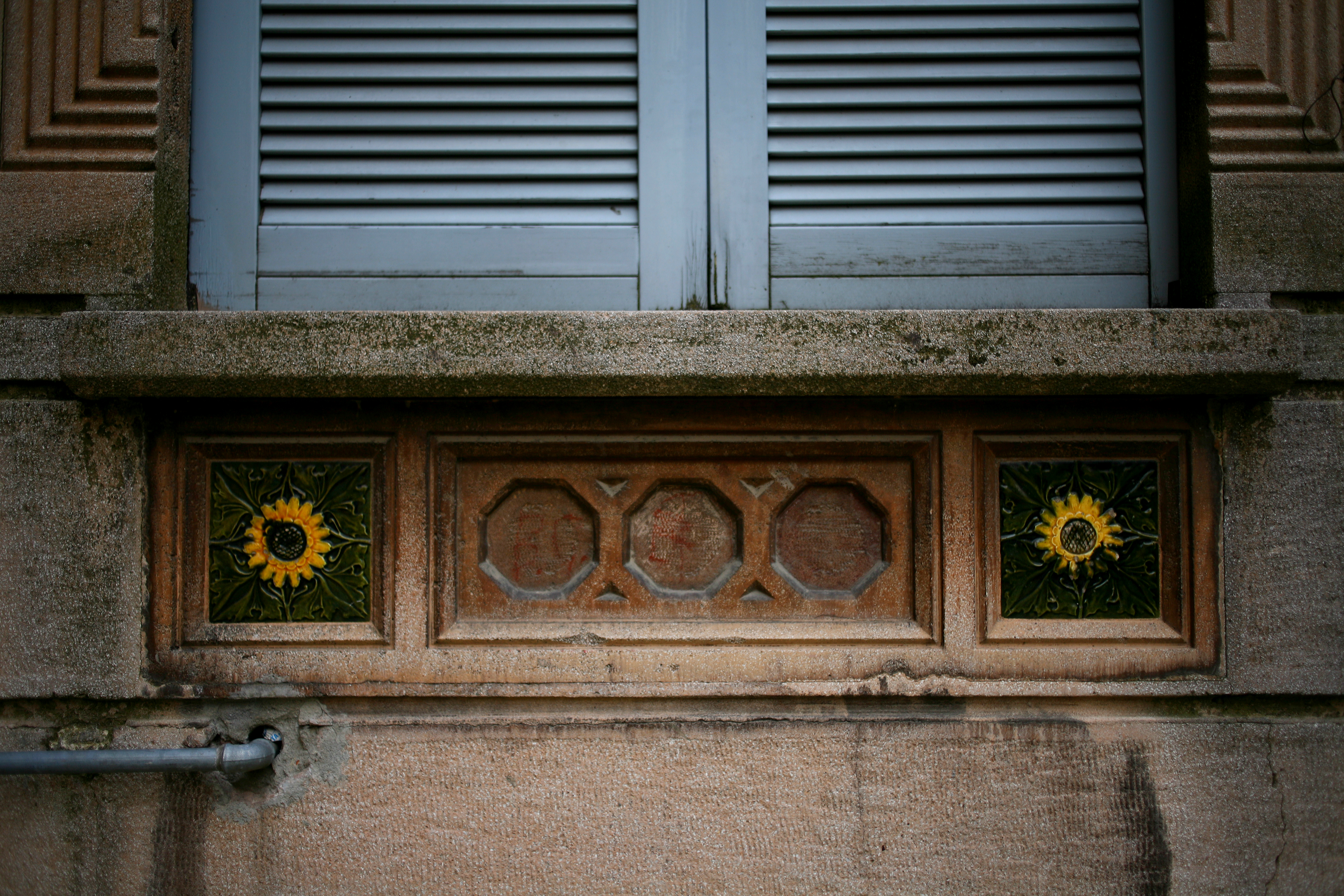
Decorative panels manufactured in series for the Via Solari neighborhood

The great industrial growth of the city of Milan resulted, in addition to the construction of elaborate and refined bourgeois residences, in the constant migratory influx into the city of masses of workers belonging mainly to the proletariat. In 1901 almost 60% of the population of Milan, about 280,000 people, belonged to the working class. On the one hand, the growing need for affordable housing for the less wealthy classes; and, on the other, the occasion of the Universal Exposition to be held in the city in 1906, led the city authorities to draw up one of the first articulated plans of popular architecture in the city.

It was on this occasion that the Primo quartiere popolare della Società Umanitaria was built on Via Solari according to the project of the architect Giovanni Broglio. It is one of the first examples of social architecture in the city, as well as one of the first applications of art nouveau in popular architecture. The project envisaged eleven four-story buildings with a total of two hundred and forty residential units equipped with private bathrooms with drinking water, intended to accommodate a total of about a thousand people. The maximum rent for the larger apartments was one hundred liras per month (just under three hundred and fifty euros updated to 2006). Logically, the project could not feature the elaborate and expensive decorations of the bourgeois liberty houses, therefore Broglio adopted industrially mass-produced decorative elements. The term liberty minore is sometimes used to define this style which, despite having a much smaller budget, nevertheless allowed a diffuse and homogeneous architectural decoration, although not very elaborate.

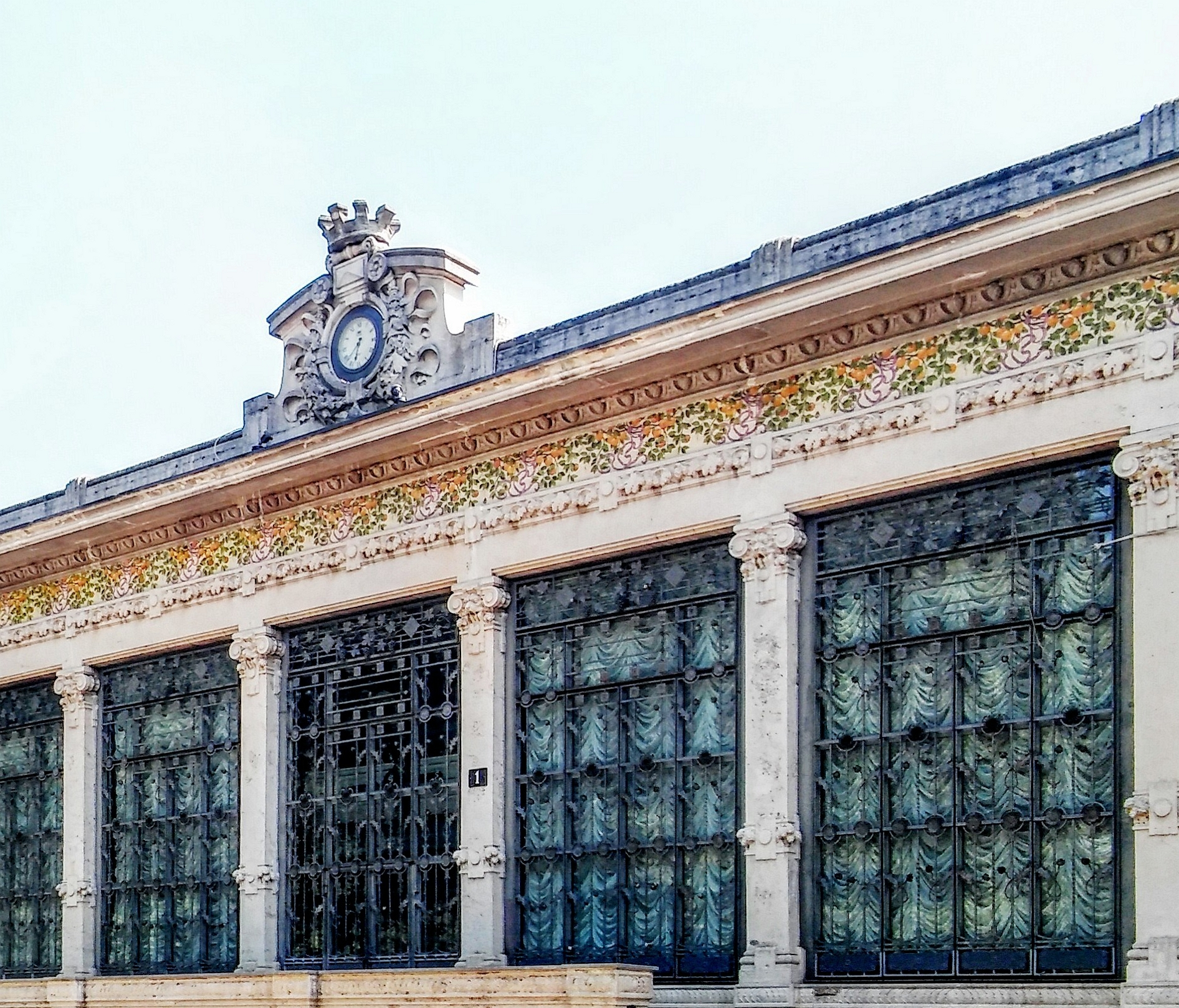
Palazzina Liberty detail

Another example of popular architecture built in the same period was the Quartiere Ripamonti, although, unlike the previous case, the decoration is almost null, except for the wrought iron elements. Overall, between 1905 and 1912, the share of area devoted to interventions of popular architecture barely exceeded 6% of the total—a figure which, despite the frequency with which the problem was discussed, according to Casero did not contribute to significantly improve the housing problem for less well-off families.

An intervention again of a different kind was the realization of the first nucleus of the Villaggio dei Giornalisti, founded in the early years of the 20th century by a cooperative of professionals belonging to the world of journalism, which aimed to build housing dedicated to the petty bourgeoisie, who had been excluded from the popular architectural plans but were not wealthy enough to afford luxurious art nouveau palaces in the center. The result was the construction of houses in a liberty style halfway between the rich style of the upper bourgeoisie and the simplicity of popular housing.

Not dedicated to housing but also for public use was the new Milanese fruit and vegetable market built from 1908. Of the old complex, today largely converted into a park, only the building commonly called Palazzina Liberty remains, featuring large wrought iron stained glass windows and decorations with ceramic tiles by Fornace Guerra Gregorj.

== The Great Expo of Work of 1906 ==
In 1906, Milan hosted the Universal Exhibition dedicated to the world of transport on the occasion of the inauguration of the Simplon Tunnel. In addition to novelties of a technological nature, the exhibition was the definitive test bed and an exceptional occasion to showcase the New Art Nouveau style. Among the various technological pavilions were some less technical ones to attract a larger public, among which were those dedicated to the fine arts, which were to serve as a showcase for the progress shown in the artistic field in Italy. Among the several missing works, the entrance, which reproduced in liberty style the entrance of the Simplon Tunnel, and the railway station built on the site of the exhibition, made of cast iron, wrought iron and large stained glass windows, stand out.

A large part of the 225 buildings constructed for the occasion were designed in art nouveau style, especially the exhibition pavilions, mostly designed by the young Tuscan architect Orsino Bongi. At the end of the exhibition almost all the pavilions were demolished, except for the pavilion dedicated to fish farming, which would later be used to house the Milan Aquarium. The building, designed by architect Sebastiano Locati, was built to house a new attraction in the scientific field, thus constituting an unprecedented typology that deviated from commercial, residential or religious buildings. The underwater world served as inspiration for the building. There are friezes and ceramics depicting underwater life and sculptures of marine animals on the outer wall of the complex, circular in shape. At the entrance there is also a fountain featuring Neptune and a hippopotamus.

== Sculpture ==
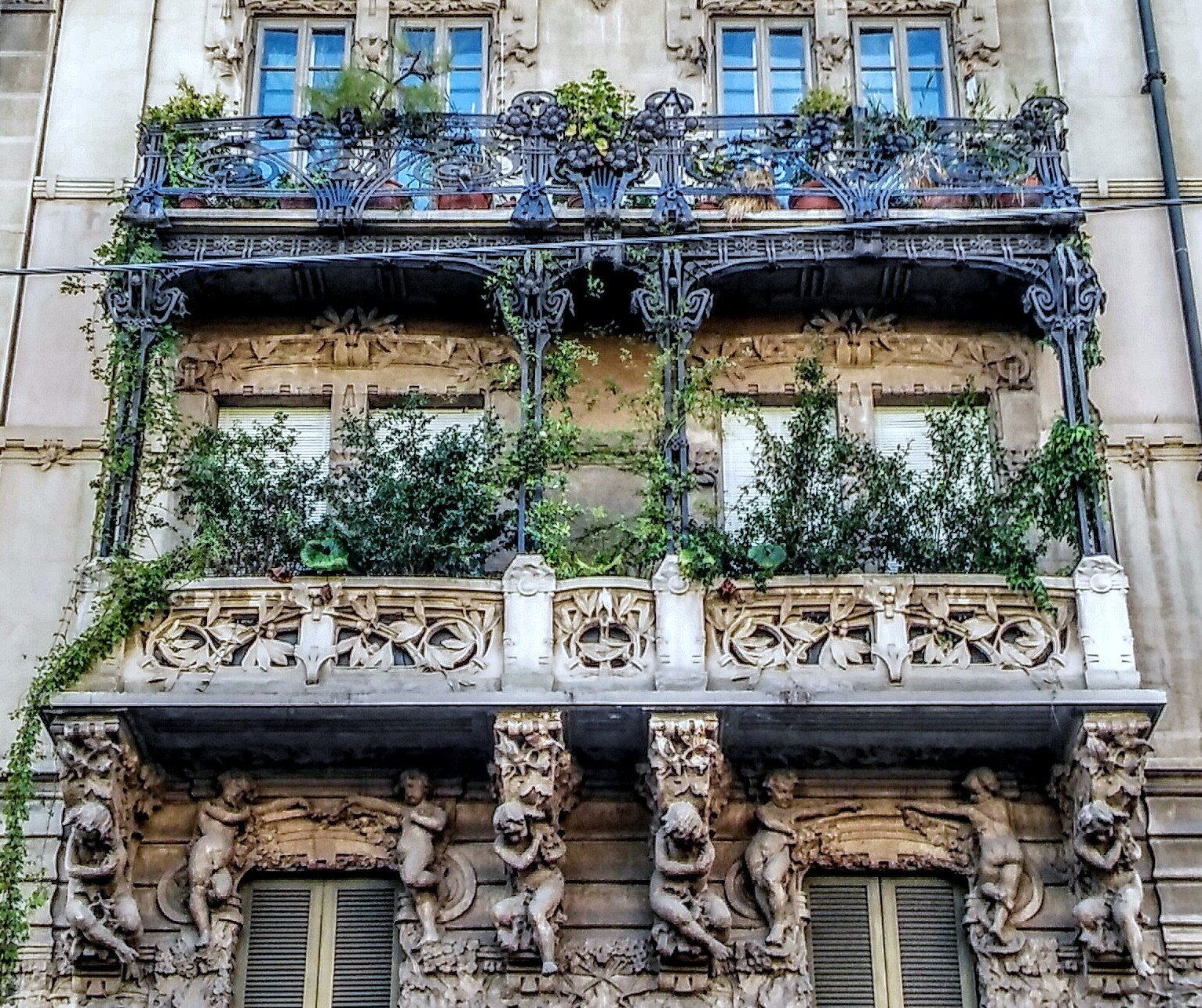
Wrought iron and cement decorations from Casa Guazzoni

Alongside traditional sculpture in marble and stone, art nouveau brought about a great development of sculpture in wrought iron and cement. According to Ogliari and Bagnera, wrought iron found its best interpreter in Alessandro Mazzucotelli, who elevated the working of this material from a simple decorative element to a true art. Mazzucotelli's masterpiece is, according to Lanza, the so-called Cancello delle Farfalle ("Door of the Butterflies") of the Casa Moneta, a work that encapsulates all the styles of the Milanese variant of liberty: the geometric and ordered motifs of the lower part are quickly transformed into complex lattices that give life to leaves and the two butterflies, which thanks to the dynamism of the composition seem to take flight, almost completely annulling the heaviness of the iron.

Mazzucotelli also realized a very high number of works scattered throughout the city, integrated into the architecture as in the case of the balconies of the Casa Ferrario, or simply ornamental as the gate of the Casa Campanini, the railing of the Villino Maria Luisa or the Scalone delle Rose ("Staircase of the Roses") of the Casa Morganti. Finally, Ogliari and Bagnera also highlight Mazzucotelli's activity in the applied arts and in the funeral monuments of the Monumental Cemetery of Milan.

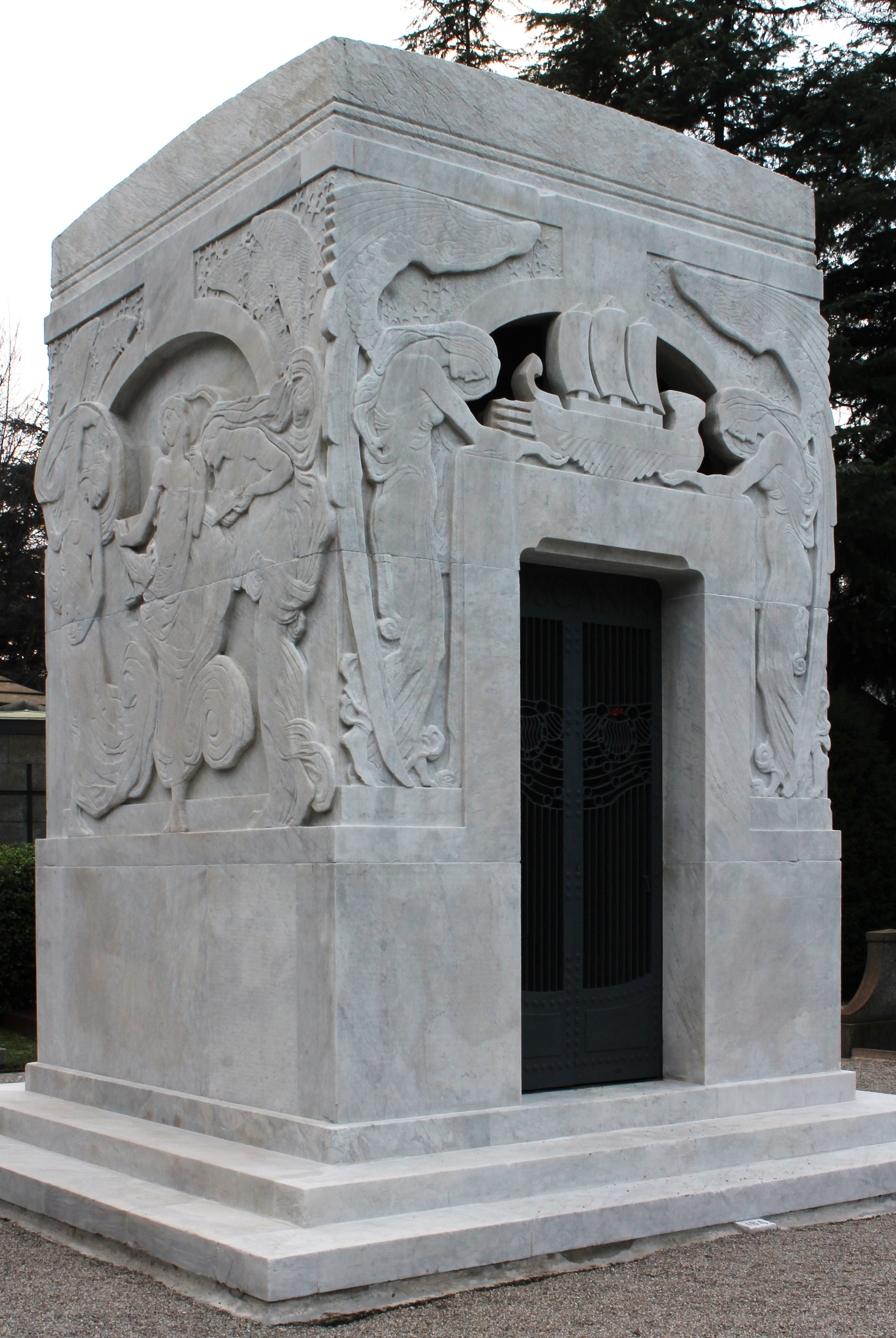
Edicola Toscanini in the Monumental Cemetery

It was precisely in the latter that, according to Roiter, the most important laboratory of art nouveau sculpture related to architecture was developed—sculpture that, as in the case of architecture, merged in a more or less accentuated way with eclectic and art deco themes. As with the palaces, the Milanese bourgeoisie of the time found in funeral sculpture a new element to increase its prestige.

According to Casero, one of the most remarkable monuments in the cemetery is the Edicola Toscanini, made in Carrara marble by Leonardo Bistolfi. It consists of a simple parallelepiped-shaped monument with bas-reliefs representing allegorical figures of the life of the deceased, together with lines inspired by the German jugendstil, whose orderly and geometric composition manages to conjugate with the curved lines and sinuosity of a more floral liberty. Among the examples of floral liberty is the Edicola Giudici designed by Paolo Mezzanotte, whose decoration, realized by the brothers Carlo and Luigi Rigola, consists of cast bronze modeled in the shape of roses and withered branches: the floral theme of liberty is thus adapted to the funeral theme. The monument is completed by a mosaic, also with a floral theme.

More exuberant, according to Ogliari and Bagnera, is the Edicola Origgi, an example of sculpture in cement that develops its structure through the crossing between straight and curved lines until ending in a dome: the dominant theme in the decorations of the monument is also the floral theme, with palm leaves, sunflowers and poppy seeds. According to Casero, other monuments in floral style worthy of mention are the Edicola Suffert, which has bronze bas-reliefs with angels and iris by Alfredo Sassi, and the Edicola Croci, decorated with one of the few bronze sculptures by Mazzucotelli, usually dedicated to wrought iron.

== Eclectic influences and decadence of the liberty ==
Having reached its peak with the 1906 exhibition, Milanese liberty began a period of reciprocal influences with eclecticism, which never entirely disappeared in the various commissions of the bourgeois.

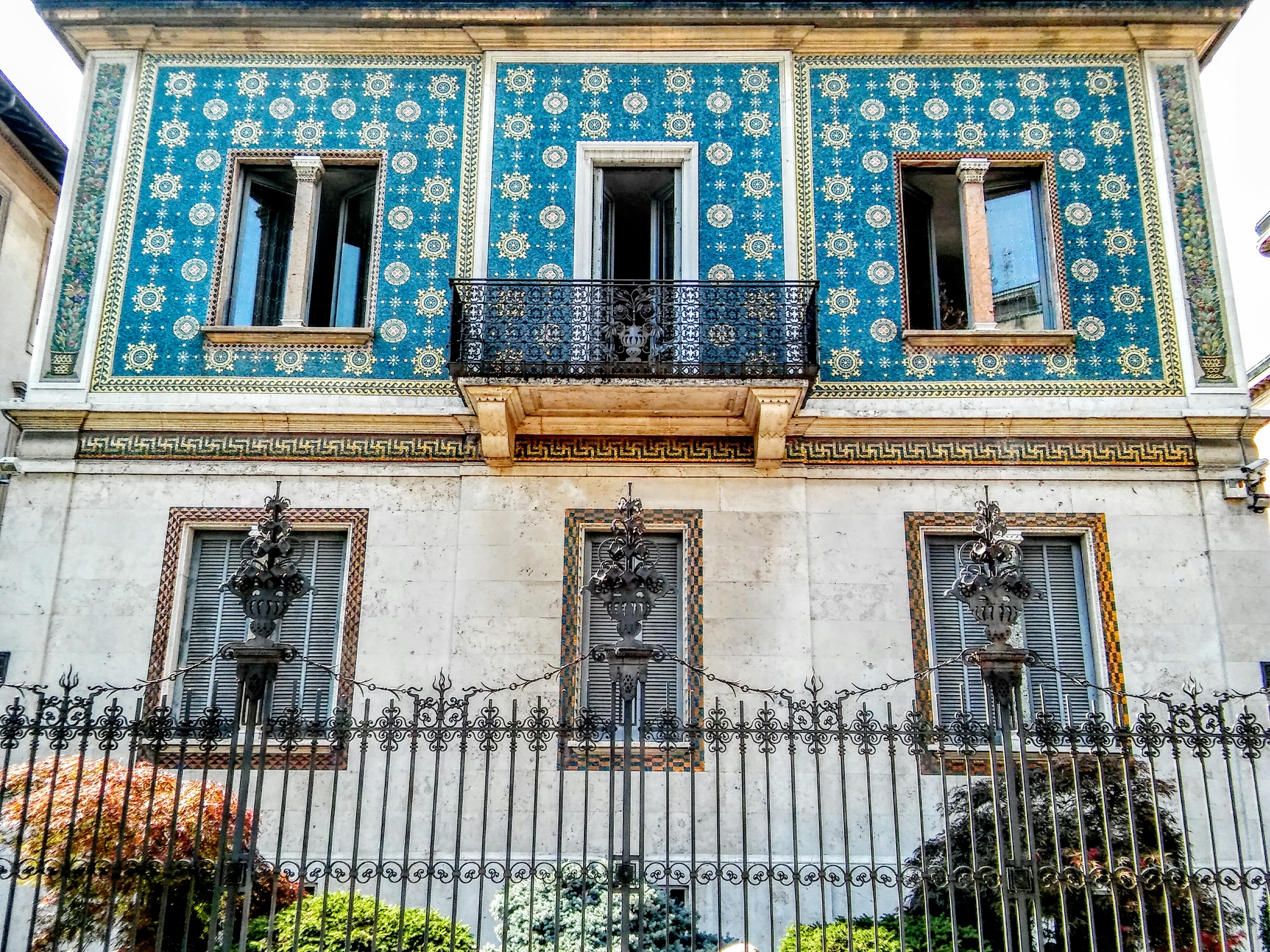
The Maria Luisa Villino and the Mazzucotelli railing.

Alongside a real revival of neo-Renaissance and neomedieval architecture with slight modernist influences, as shown by the Castello Cova built in 1910, one can find opposite cases, such as the Villino Maria Luisa, realized with mosaic decoration in which neo-Gothic and neo-Renaissance themes coexist with modernist mosaics with floral themes and a railing by Alessandro Mazzucotelli, which is one of the best examples of iron sculpture in the city. According to Melano, other examples to note of this trend are the Casa Berri Meregalli and Palazzo Berri Meregalli by Giulio Arata, built in 1911, in which one finds a mixture of classical styles alongside modernist themes: rustic bossage and the vertical development of the building recall neo-Gothic architecture; the interior decorated with mosaics recalls the Byzantine architecture of Ravenna; while Mazzucotelli's wrought ironwork and the succession of animal statues take up the typical themes of floral art nouveau.

At the dawn of World War I, this tainted liberty style went from being an expression of modernity to being strongly criticized as old and outdated, partly because of the abundant use of classical elements long considered outdated. The Milan Central Station, built from 1924 in a late-eclectic style with Art Deco decorations and modernist influences, is considered by Gualdoni and Melano the conclusion of art nouveau in Milan, which made room for art deco and Novecento.

== See also ==
- Art Nouveau
- Decorative arts
- Modernisme
- History of architecture and art in Milan

== Bibliography ==
- Bossaglia, Rossana; Terraioli, Valerio (2003). Il liberty a Milano (in Italian). Milán: Skira editore. ISBN 88-8491-681-X.
- Casero, Cristina (2000). Liberty, Déco e stile Novecento (in Italian). Milán: Nodo Libri. ISBN 88-7185-076-9.
- Colombo, Claudio (2006). Quando l'Umanitaria era in via Solari: 1906, il primo quartiere operaio (PDF) (in Italian). Robecchino con Induno: Raccolto Edizioni. Archived from the original (PDF) on 4 March 2016.
- Grandi, Maurizio; Pracchi, Attilio (1991). Milano: guida all'architettura moderna (in Italian). Bolonia: Zanichelli. ISBN 88-08-05210-9.
- Gualdoni, Chiara (2009). Milano (in Italian). Milán: Skira editore. ISBN 978-88-572-0161-0.
- Lanza, Attilia (1993). Milano e i suoi palazzi: Porta Vercellina, Comasina e Nuova (in Italian). Libreria Meravigli Editrice.
- Lopez, Guido; Susani, Elisabetta (1999). In Liberty: Milano e Lombardia (in Italian). Milán: edizioni Celip.
- Melano, Oscar Pedro (2004). Milano e l'eclettico Déco, 1900–1950 (in Italian). Milan: Gabriele Mazzotta editore. ISBN 88-202-1718-X.
- Ogliari, Francesco; Bagnera, Roberto (2006). Milano liberty (in Italian). Pavía: Edizioni Selecta. ISBN 88-7332-162-3.
- Roiter, Fulvio (1993). Milano in liberty (in Italian). Milan: edizioni Celip.
- Speziali, Andrea; Sacerdoti, Pierfrancesco (2015). Italian Liberty : una nuova stagione dell'art nouveau (in Italian). Forlì: Cartacanta. ISBN 978-88-96629-65-9.
