= Casa Broggi =

Building in Milan, Italy

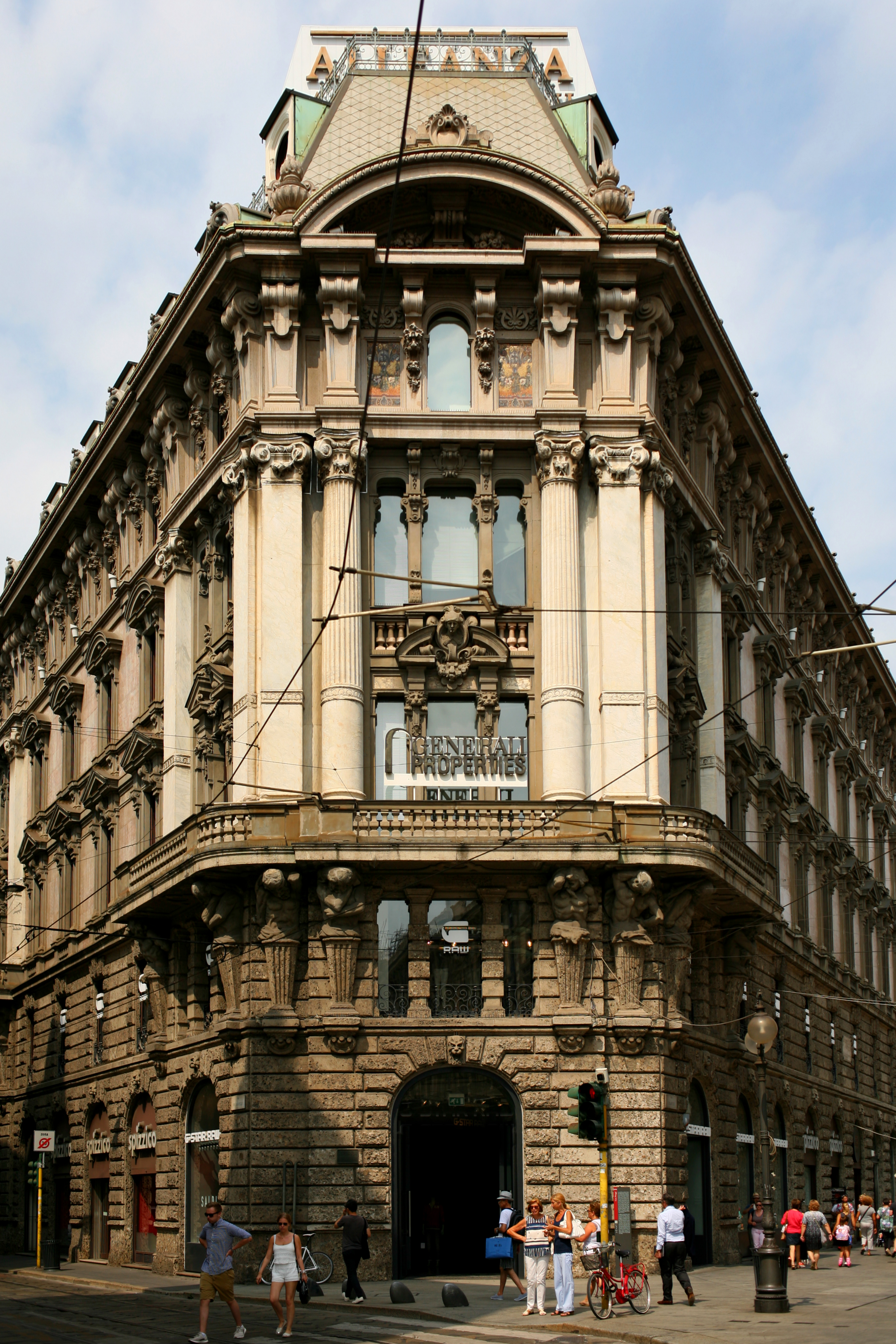
- Via Meravigli facade

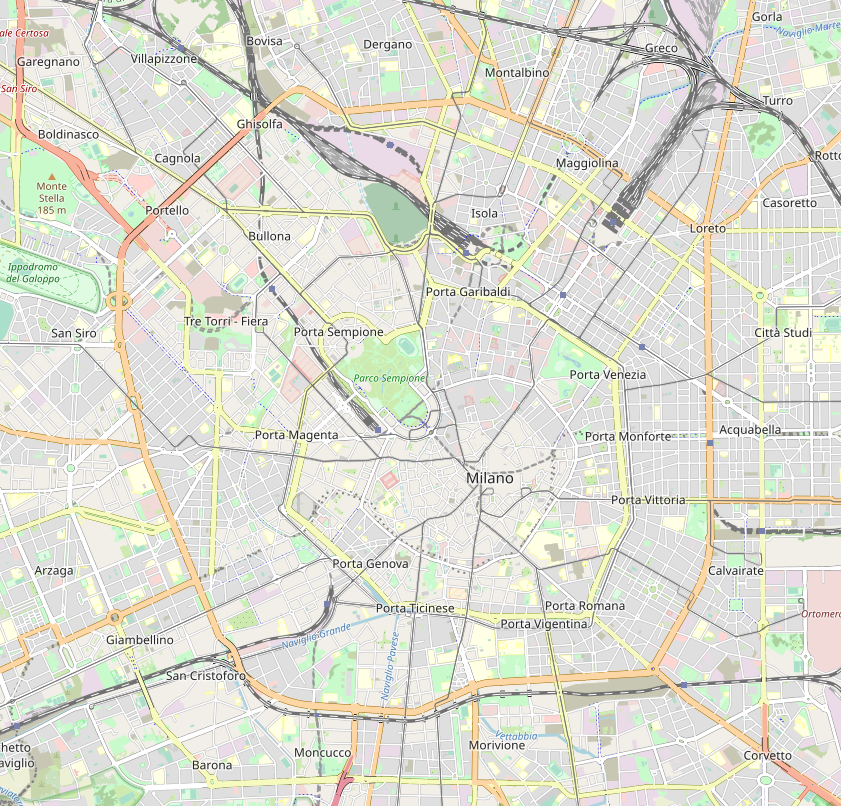
- Location within Milan Location within Italy

General information
- Location: Via Dante #5, Milan, Italy
- Coordinates: 45.46594°N 9.18502°E
- Construction started: 1889
- Construction stopped: 1891

Design and construction
- Architects: Luigi Broggi and Giuseppe Sommaruga

Casa Broggi is a monumental building located at the intersections of Via Dante, Via Meravigli, and Via Santa Maria Segreta, at the northwest end of Piazza Cordusio in Milan. The polygonal palace has facades on the three streets mentioned above with the most scenic being the narrow edge on Via Meravigli. The structure was built for multiple use, with ground floor shops and residential apartments on the higher floors. The site had once housed the church of San Nazaro in Pietrasanta, which had been demolished in the late 19th century.

The design was a collaboration in 1891 between Luigi Broggi and his pupil Giuseppe Sommaruga. Broggi lived in the palace after completion. The decoration is eclectic including columns, floral friezes, and telamons. Atypical for Milan is the Mansard roof, which gives the building a Parisian look. The building shows the movement towards the decorative Liberty style.
