= Palazzo dei Congressi, Salsomaggiore Terme =

Coordinates: 44.81343°N 9.98446°E

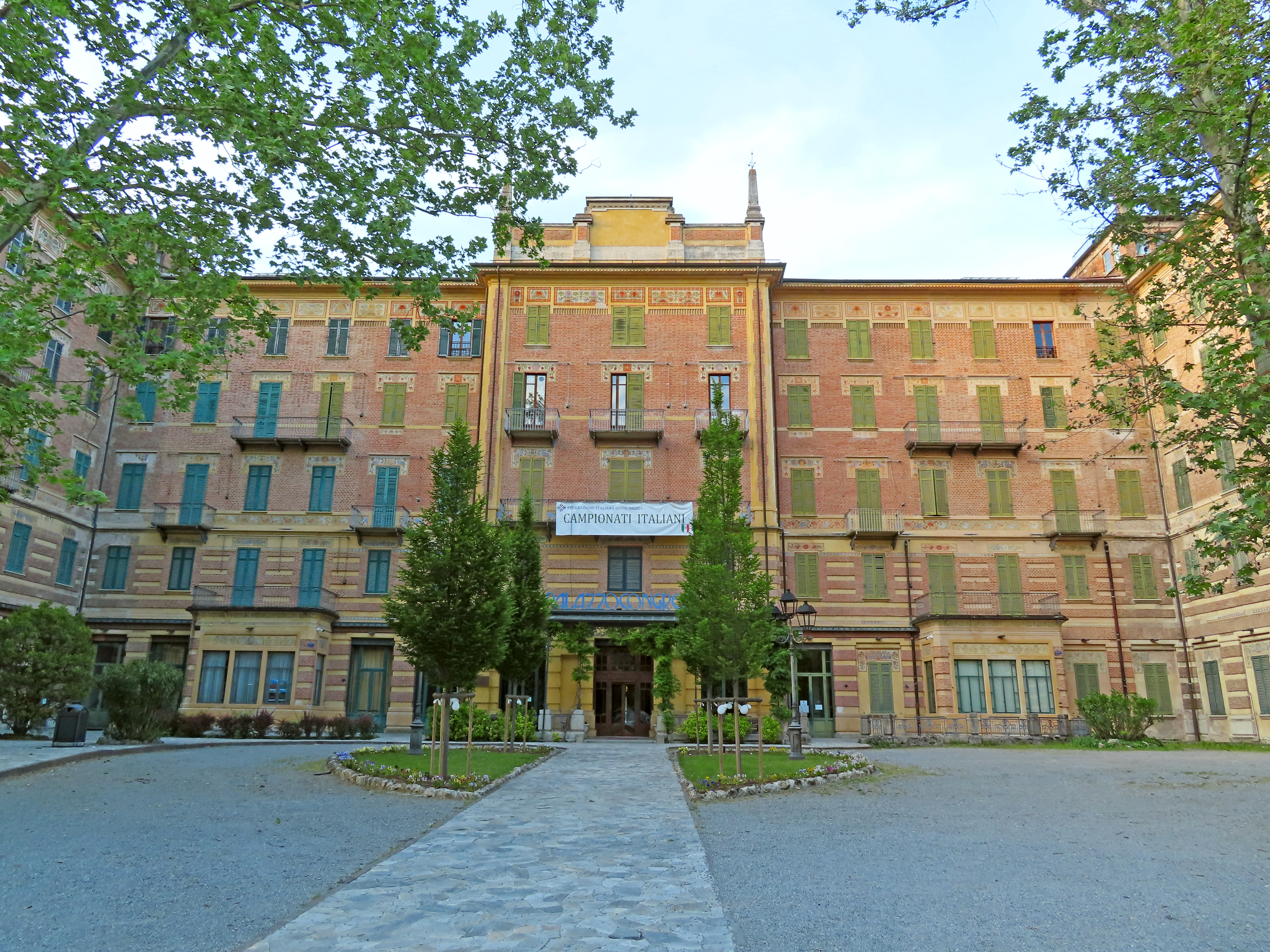
South facade of Palazzo

The Palazzo dei Congressi, which was inaugurated as the Grand Hotel des Thèrmes in 1901, is a prominent hotel and building located on Viale Giandomenico Romagnosi in Salsomaggiore in the Province of Parma, Italy. The building is decorated in Liberty style and after being acquired by the commune in 1965, the site now hosts both civic entities such as the town library (Biblioteca Comunale Gian Domenico Romagnosi); a hotel management training school (Istituto Superiore G. Magnaghi); as well as serves as a small convention center.

== History ==
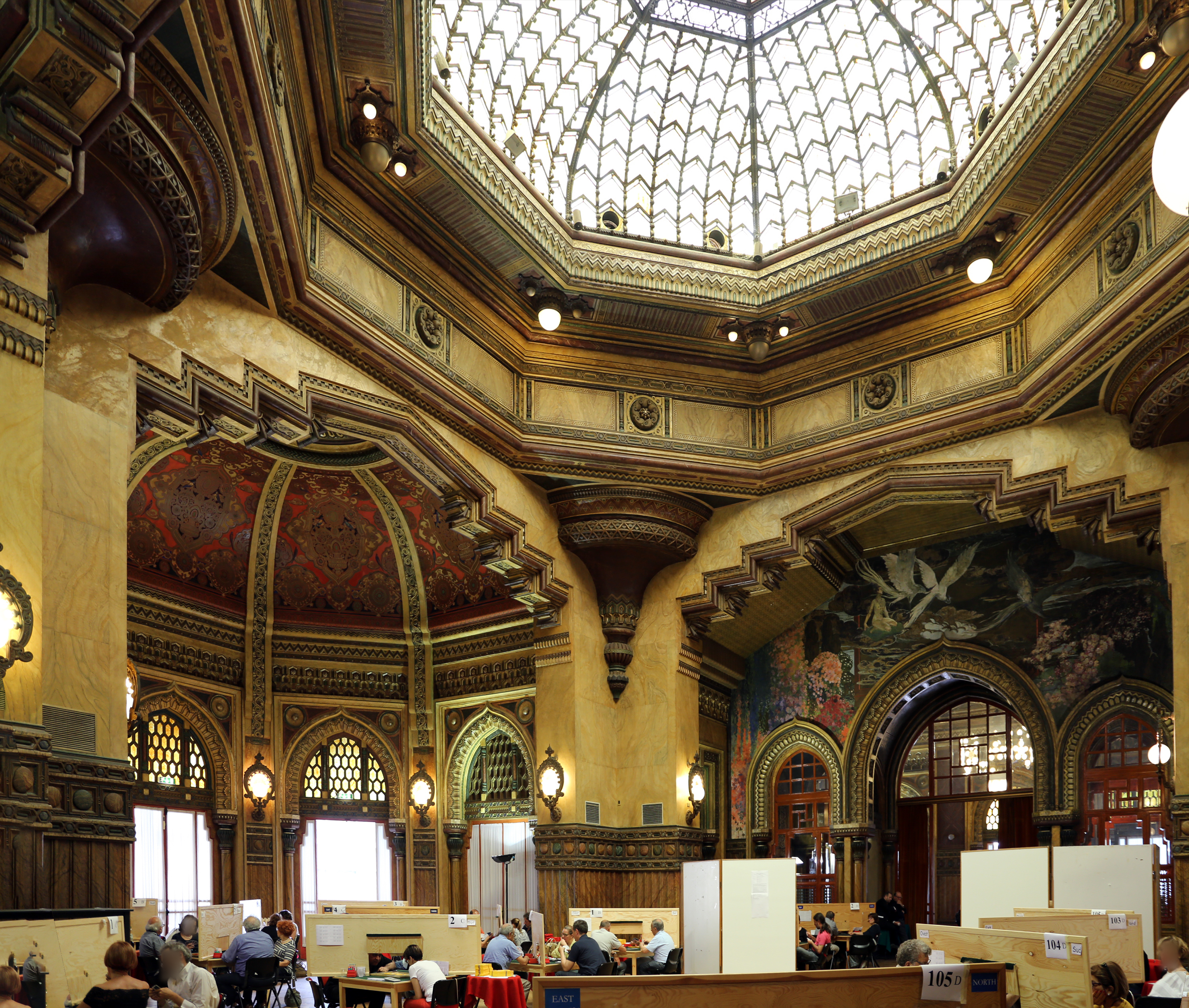
Salone Moresco by Galileo Chini

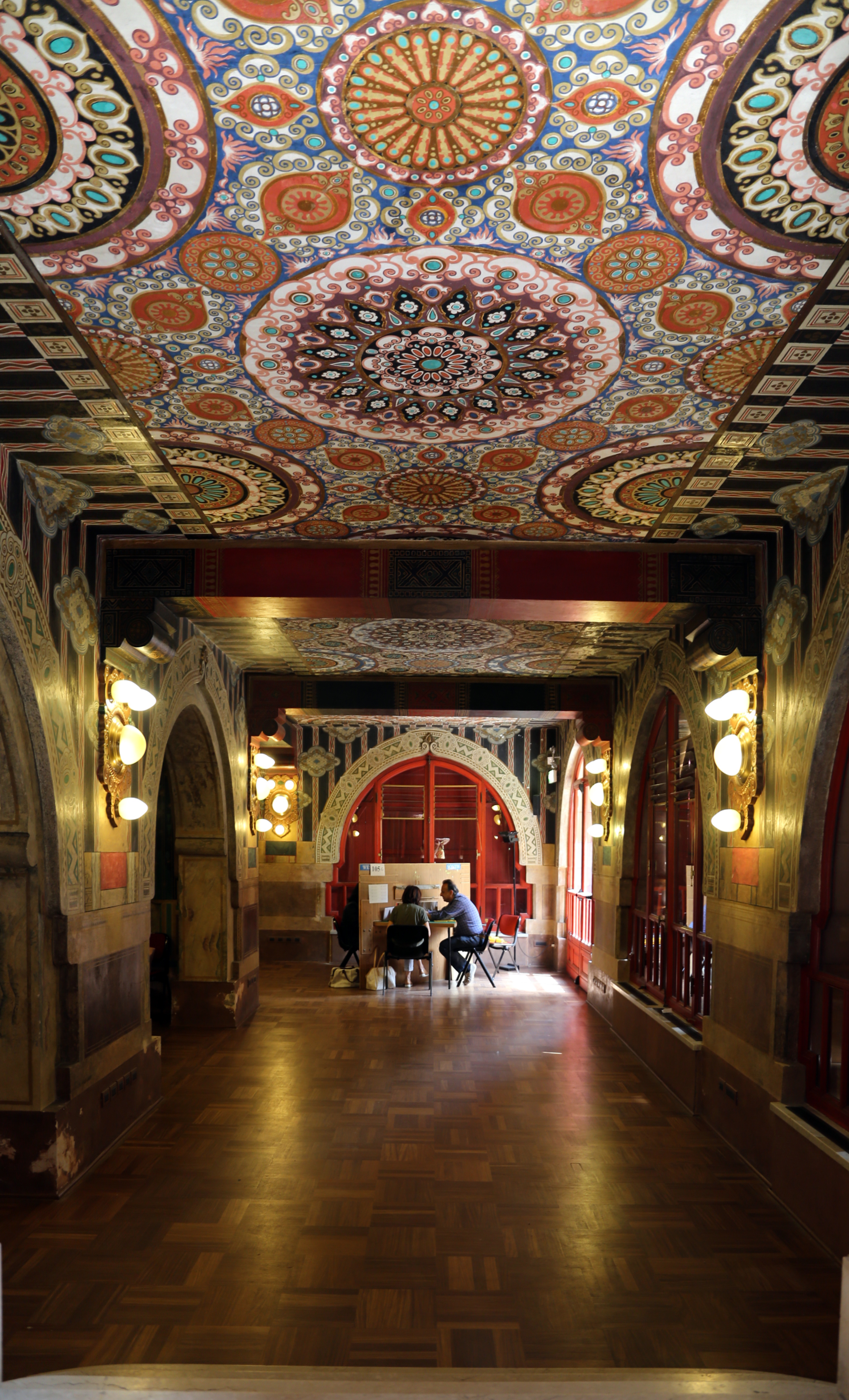
Decoration of Taverna Rossa by Chini

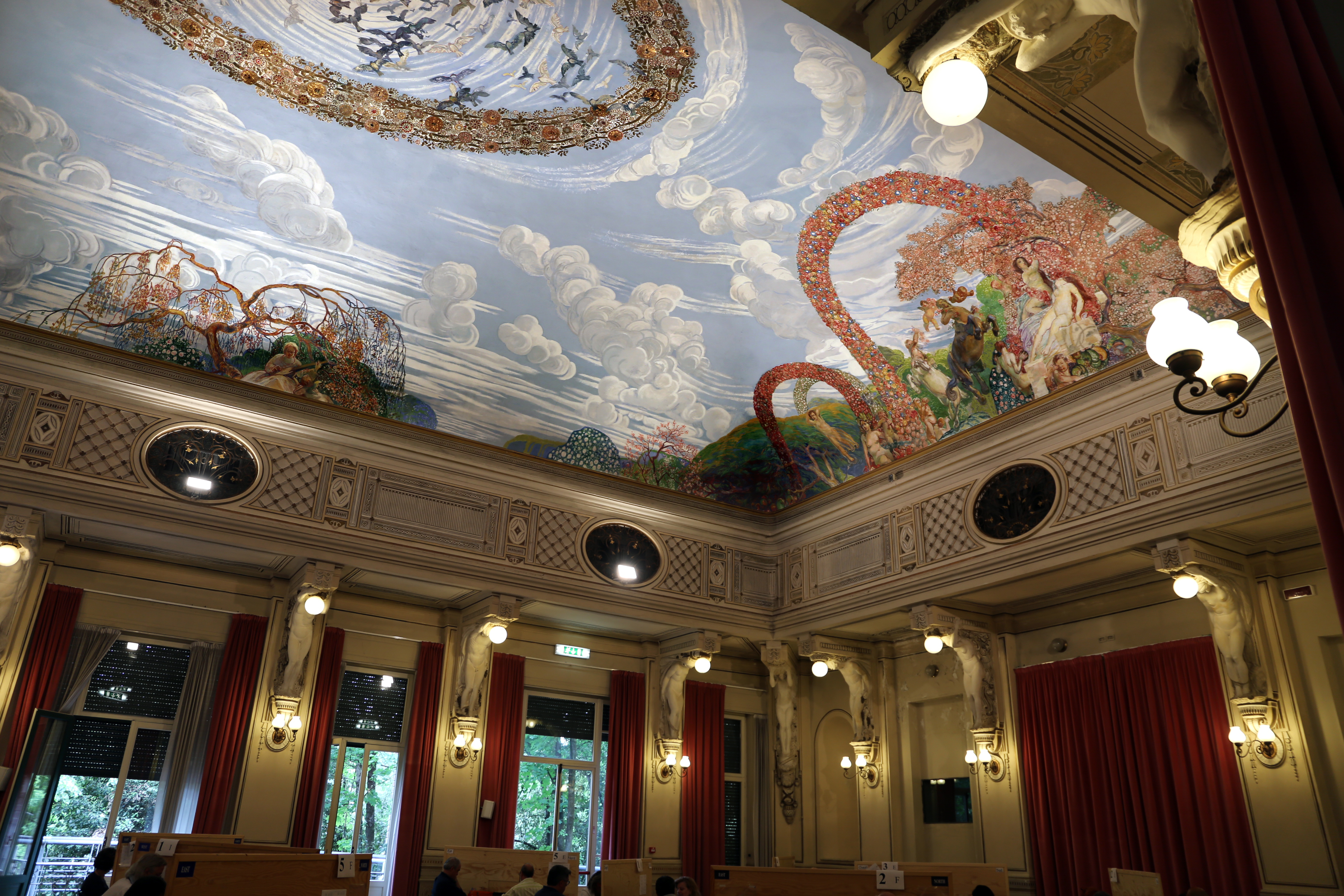
Hall of the Caryatids by Chini

The building was commissioned in 1898 by the Società Magnaghi, who engaged the designs of the architect Luigi Broggi. After the inauguration in 1901, the hotel was purchased by César Ritz and Baron Pfyffer.

The five-story building has a central core flanked by advancing wings. Originally built to have 300 rooms. The facade has a decorative brick layout, with horizontal rustication in the base but at the top floor, a lively frieze of floral tiles, designed by Gottardo Valentini.

After the first world war, the hotel was ceded to the Società Anonima Grandi Alberghi Salsomaggiore, which enlarged the hotel and added new elaborate rooms, including the Salone Moresco, the Taverna Rossa, and loggia designed by Ugo Giusti and Galileo Chini. The latter also designed the eclectic decorations in neo-moorish style for the Salone, and of peculiar cariatids in another room. The artist Antonio Veronesi helped decorate the cupola of the Salone Moresco, with stain glass windows from the Chini factory of Borgo San Lorenzo. The sculptor Salvatore Aloisi created the stucco decoration. Finally Franco Spicciani created the lacquered tables and chairs of the Taverna Rossa.
