= Magazzini Contratti =

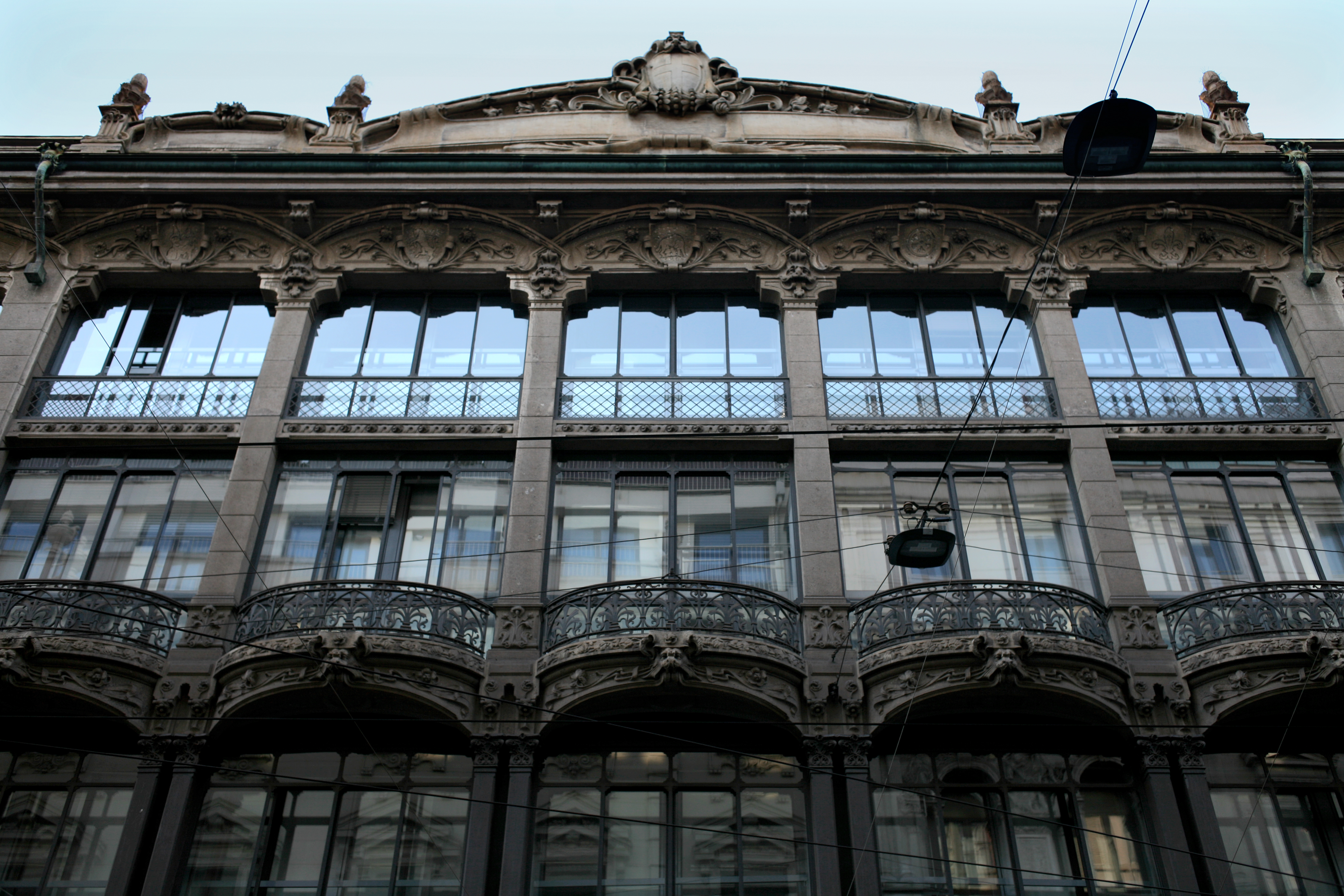
- Magazzini Contratti in Milan
- Click on the map for a fullscreen view

General information
- Architectural style: Art Nouveau
- Location: Milan, Italy
- Coordinates: 45°27′56.71″N 9°11′14.65″E

Design and construction
- Architect: Luigi Broggi

The Magazzini Contratti is a historic commercial building in Milan, Italy.

== History ==
Construction works started in 1903. The building was designed by architect Luigi Broggi, who designed several other notable buildings in the area surrounding Piazza Cordusio.

== Description ==
The building is located in the centre of Milan, and is adjacent to the Palazzo del Credito Italiano. Realized in the new stile moderno or Art Nouveau style, it features a reinforced concrete structure. This technique, highly innovative at the time of construction, allowed for the presence of large windows on the façade interspersed by ornate cast-iron columns.

== Gallery ==
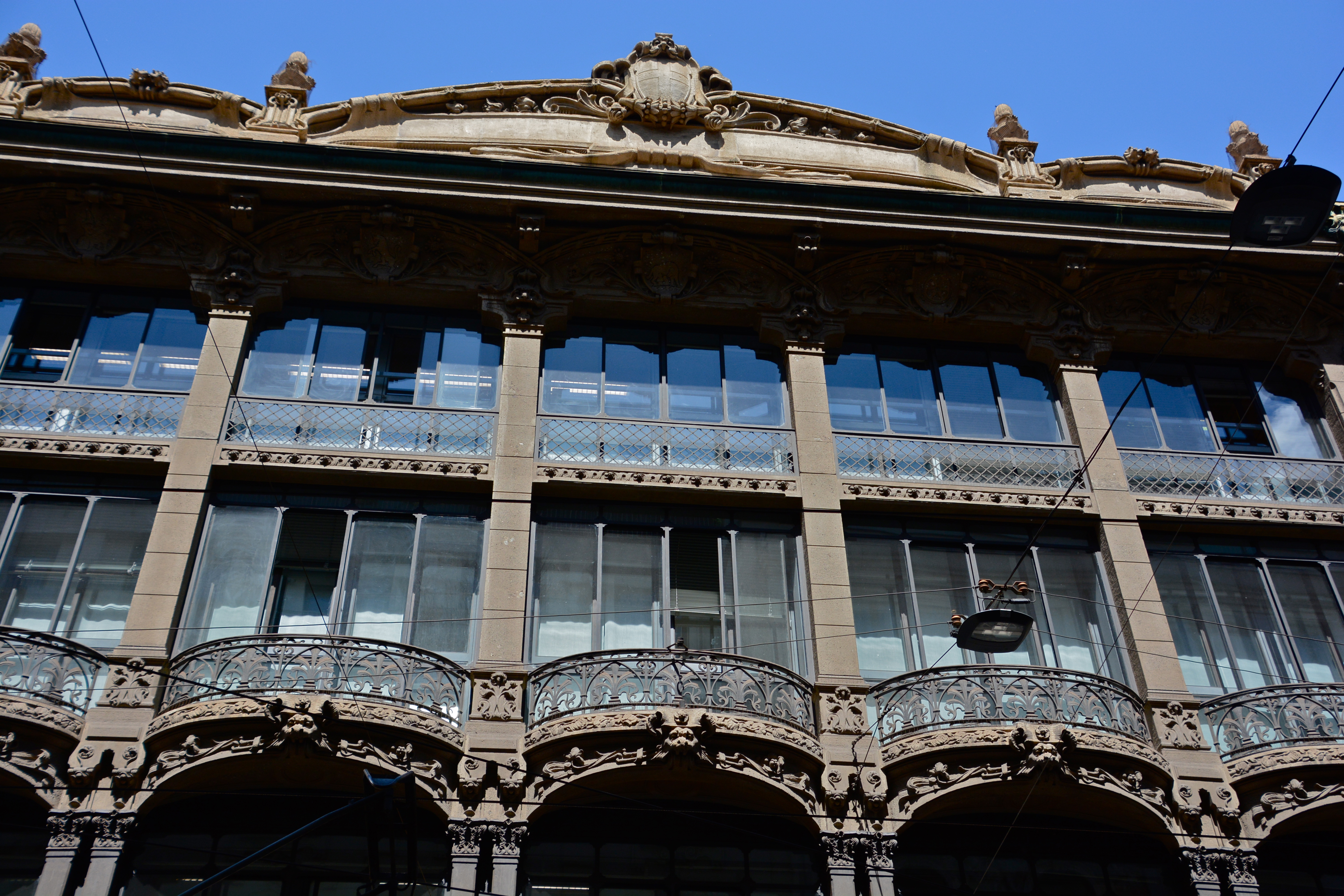

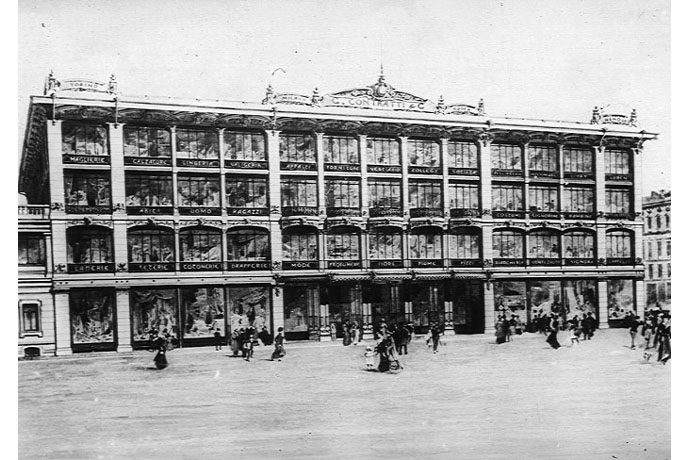

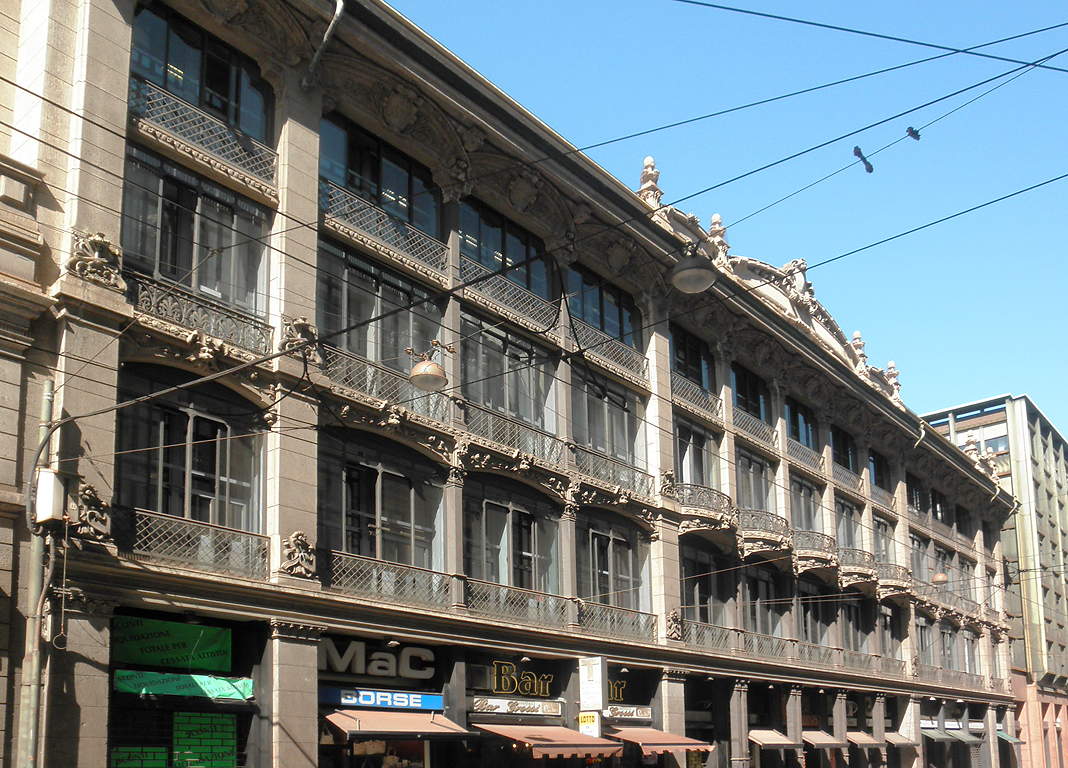
