= Starbucks Reserve Roastery (Milan) =

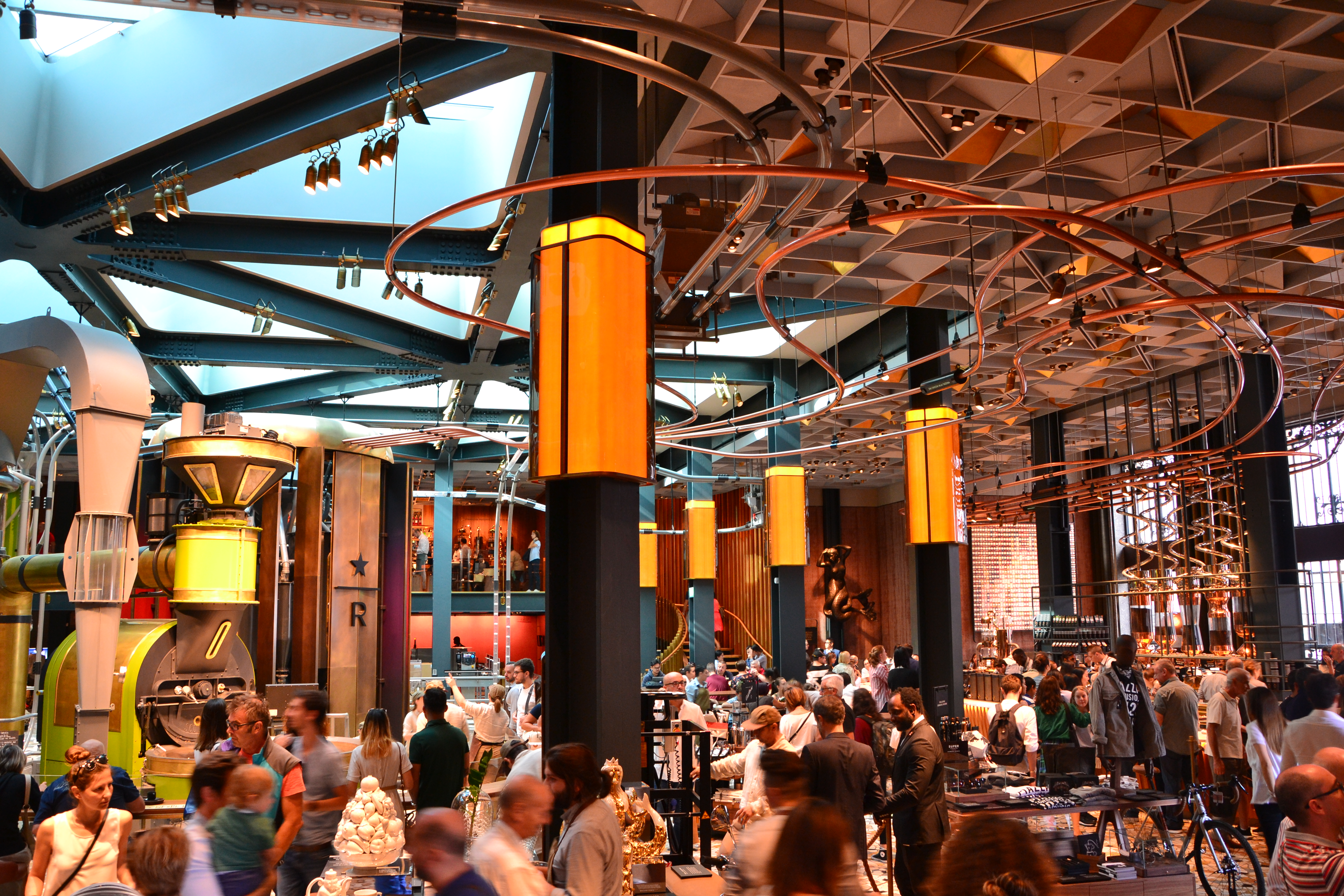
- Interior, 2018
- Interactive map of Starbucks Reserve Roastery

Restaurant information
- Location: Milan, Italy
- Coordinates: 45.4649°N 9.1862°E

The Starbucks Reserve Roastery Milan operates in Palazzo Broggi in Milan, Italy. It opened in 2018, as Starbucks's first cafe in Italy.

The interior was designed considering its location. Most Starbucks locations utilize warm materials like wood, rather than stone surfaces. For the Milan location, an exception was made with the installation of Calacatta marble counters, due to marble's commonplace use in high-end Italian coffee shops. The counters have a radiant heating system to keep them warm.

The location has a main bar with seven different coffees, a self-service bean bar, a wood-fired oven bakery, a Princi foodservice area, a retail space, and an "Arriviamo" cocktail bar serving coffee-based cocktails and Italian drinks like the Aperol Spritz. The main bar has an affogato station, unique to the Milan location. The affogato ice cream is made to order with liquid nitrogen, served with an espresso shot. The coffee roasted in the building is used in Starbucks locations in Europe, the Middle East, and Africa.
