= Galileo Chini =

Italian painter (1873–1956)

Galileo Chini photographed by Mario Nunes Vais circa 1904

Galileo Chini (2 December 1873 – 23 August 1956) was an Italian decorator, designer, painter, and potter.

== Biography ==
A prominent member of the Italian Liberty style movement, or Italian Art Nouveau, Chini taught decorative arts at the Accademia di Belle Arti in Florence. He was responsible for several of the paintings and decorations in the Brandini Chapel at Castelfiorentino, the church of San Francesco de' Ferri in Pisa, and the Ananta Samakhom Throne Hall in Bangkok. He helped design and decorate rooms in the Palazzo dei Congressi, Salsomaggiore Terme. His theatrical work included designing the sets for the European premiere of Puccini's opera Gianni Schicchi (Rome, January 1919) and the world premiere of his Turandot (Milan, 1926). He also created the sets for the premieres of Umberto Giordano's opera La cena delle beffe (Milan, 1924) and Sem Benelli's play of the same name on which the opera was based (Rome, 1909).

Influenced by Gustav Klimt, in 1914 Chini created a cycle of decorative panels entitled La Primavera ("Spring") to host the works of the Croatian sculptor Ivan Mestrovic (1883–1962) at the 1914 Venice Biennale.

== Gallery ==
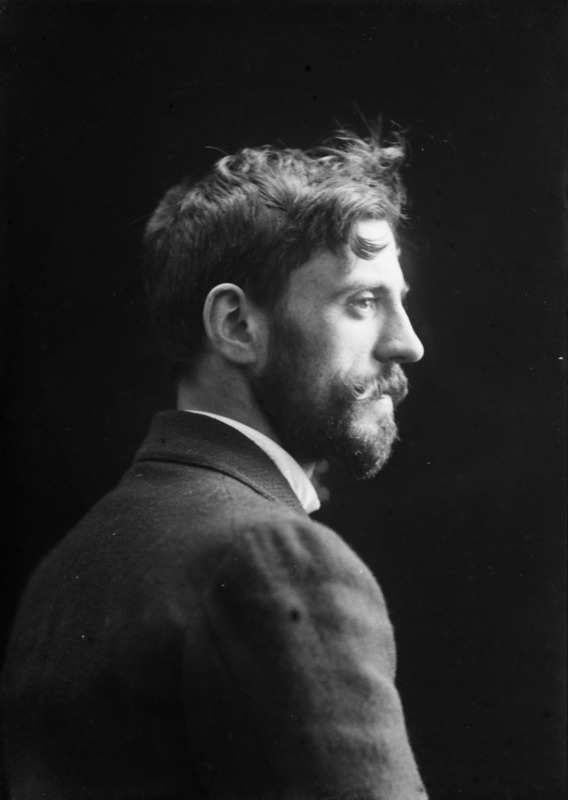
Portrait of Galileo Chini

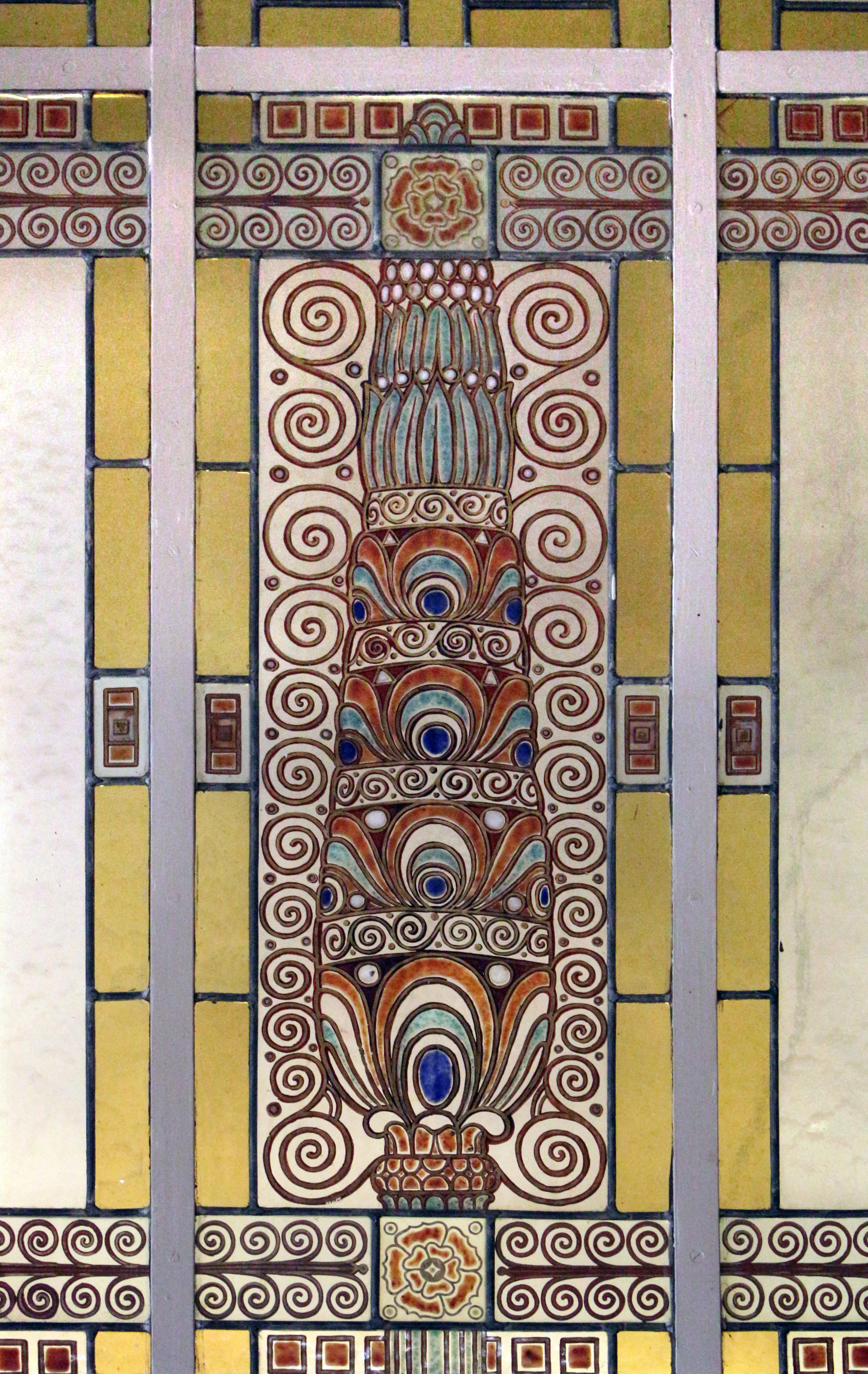
Ceramic tile façade decoration (1904)

== Sources ==
- Capri, Antonio (1971). Storia della musica: Dalle antiche civiltà orientali alla musica elettronica , Casa Editrice Dr. Francesco Vallardi.
- Pedagotti, Simona (2005). "Galileo Chini and the Brandini Chapel" in Francesca Allegri and Massimo Tosi (eds.), Castelfiorentino: Terra d'arte: centro viario e spirituale sulla Francigena, pp. 185–189. Federighi. ISBN 88-89159-07-3
- Peleggi, Maurizio (2002). Lords of Things: The Fashioning of the Siamese Monarchy's Modern Image. University of Hawaii Press. ISBN 0-8248-2558-6
