= Palazzo del Credito Italiano =

Building in Milan, Italy

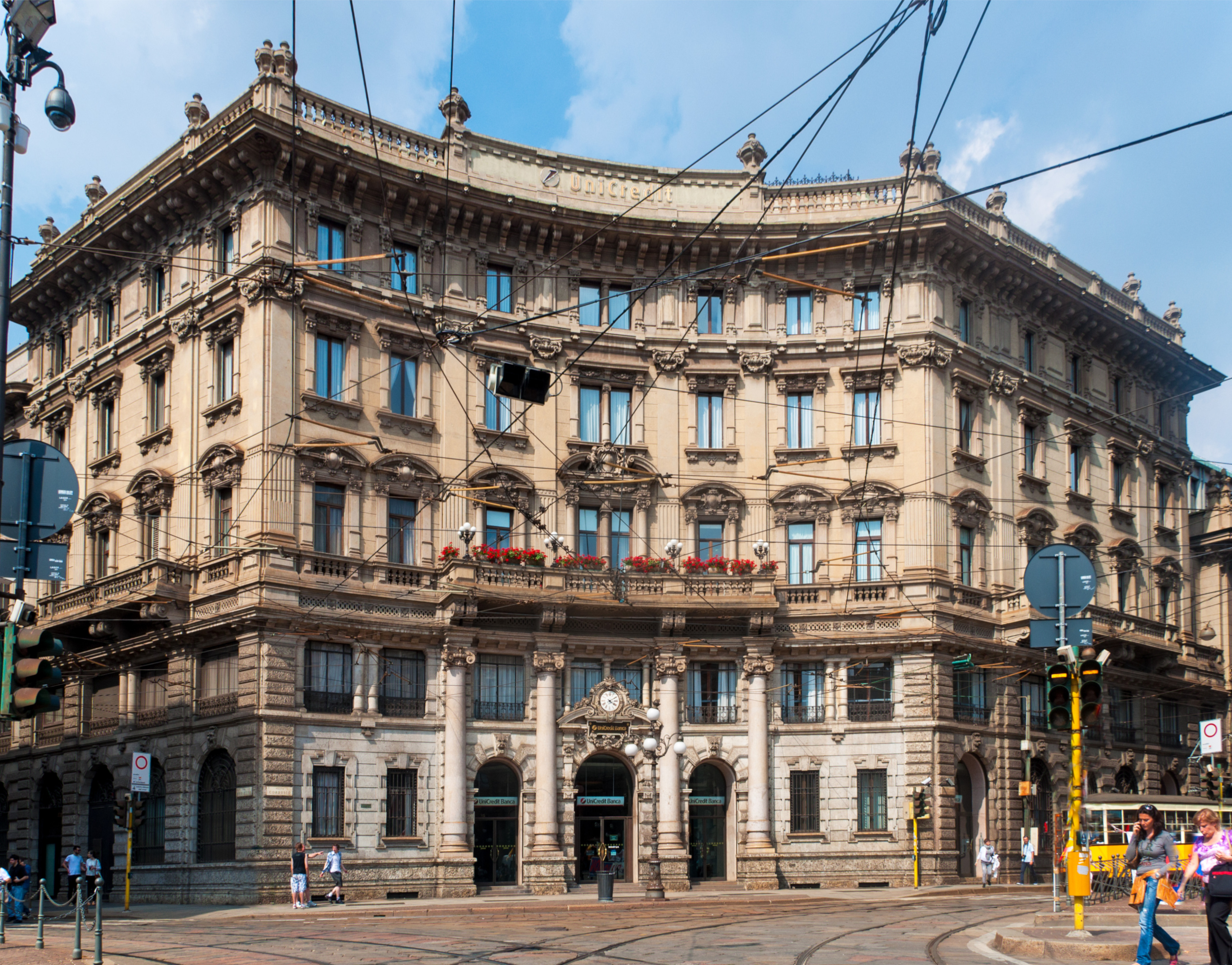
- Palazzo del Credito Italiano in Milan
- Click on the map for a fullscreen view

General information
- Architectural style: Eclectic
- Location: Milan, Italy
- Coordinates: 45°27′57.13″N 9°11′13.6″E

Design and construction
- Architect(s): Luigi Broggi

The Palazzo del Credito Italiano is a historic building situated in Piazza Cordusio in Milan, Italy.

== History ==
The building, completed in 1901, was designed by the Italian architect Luigi Broggi. It was inaugurated on August 25, 1902. It housed the seat of the Italian banking group Unicredit until its offices were moved in the newly built Unicredit Tower in 2013.

== Description ==
The building is situated in Piazza Cordusio, a major square in the centre of Milan, and is adjacent to the Magazzini Contratti. It features a concave façade which adapts itself to the elliptic shape of the square.
