= Palazzo Broggi =

Building in Milan, Italy

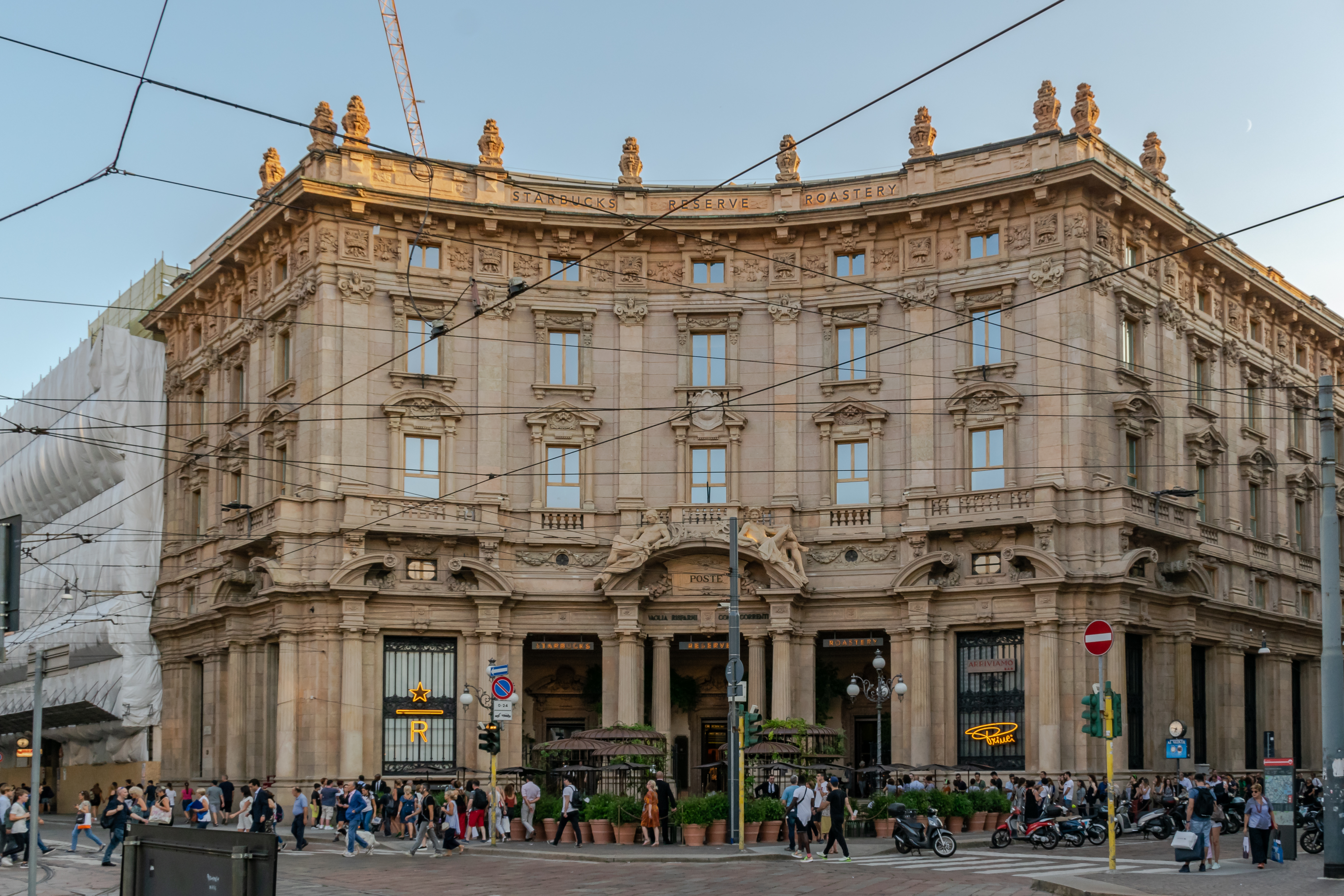
The building's exterior in 2018

Palazzo Broggi, also known as Palazzo delle Poste, is a historic building at Piazza Cordusio in Venice, Italy. Reuters has described it as "one of the more elegant office spaces in Europe". It has offices for JPMorgan as well as Italy's first Starbucks location (Starbucks Reserve Roastery).
