= Luigi Broggi =

Italian architect, Brera Academy

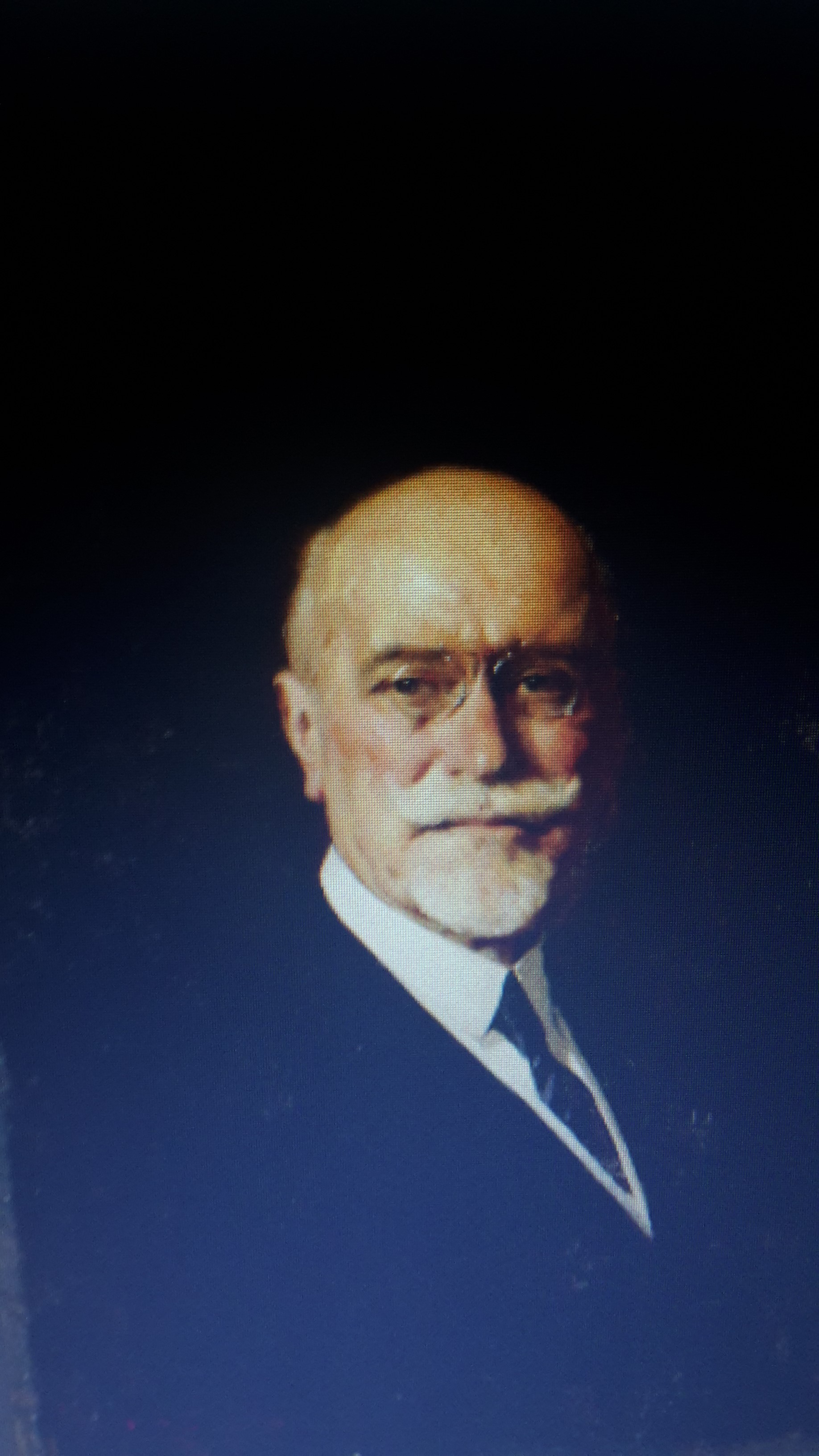
- Born: 6 May 1851; Milan, Italy
- Died: 14 October 1926 (aged 75); Milan, Italy
- Education: Polytechnic University of Milan
- Occupation: Architect
- Buildings: Palazzo Broggi, Magazzini Contratti, Palazzo della vecchia Borsa.

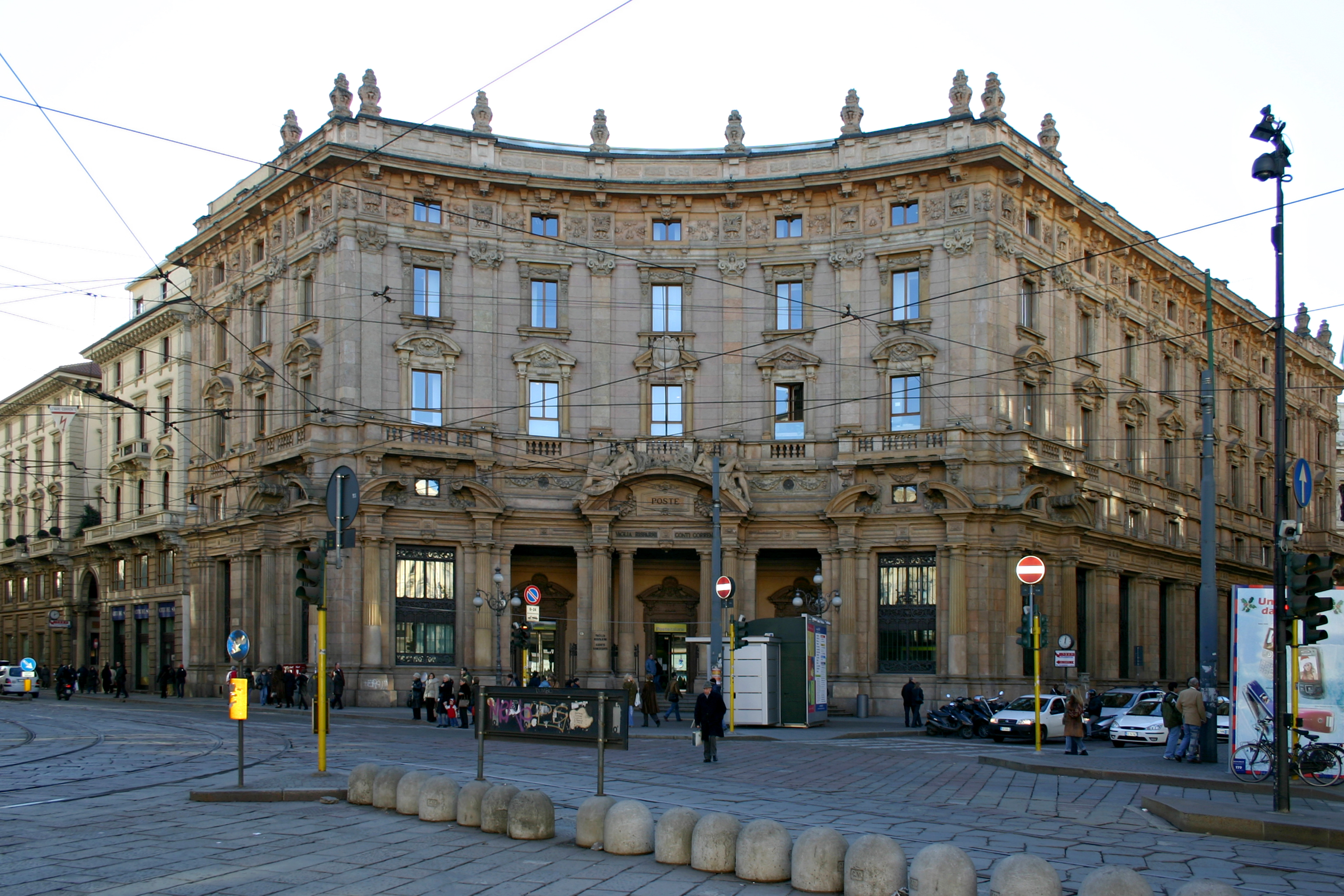
Palazzo Broggi (Palazzo delle Poste) in Piazza Cordusio, Milan

Luigi Broggi (6 May 1851 – 14 October 1926) was an Italian architect, Brera Academy alumnus and pupil of Camillo Boito, and later himself a professor at the Academy. He was mostly active in Milan; his most notable works include the Palazzo Broggi (now "Palazzo delle Poste") and the Palazzo del Credito Italiano, both in the central Piazza Cordusio, and the Magazzini Contratti building in the immediate surroundings (Via Tommaso Grossi). He also designed several villas in Lombardy, funerary monuments in the Monumental Cemetery in Milan and in the Pallanza cemetery, the Grand Hotel des Thermes (now Palazzo dei Congressi) at Salsomaggiore, and several hotels in Genoa.

He was very active in Milan's public life, participating in virtually every debate on the urban reorganization of Milan across the 19th and 20th century; he was held in high esteem by the royal family and especially by Queen Margherita of Savoy. He was also a scholar and prolific essay writer in the field of architectural history.

Along with Luca Beltrami, Carlo Maciachini, and his mentor Boito, Broggi has been a prominent representative of the eclectic period of Milanese architecture (sometimes referred to as Milanese eclecticism) although in some of his works (for example the Contratti building) he also clearly embraced the Art Nouveau canons.
