= Piazza Cordusio =

Square in Milan, Italy

Coordinates: 45°27′56.11″N 9°11′9.4″E

- Square
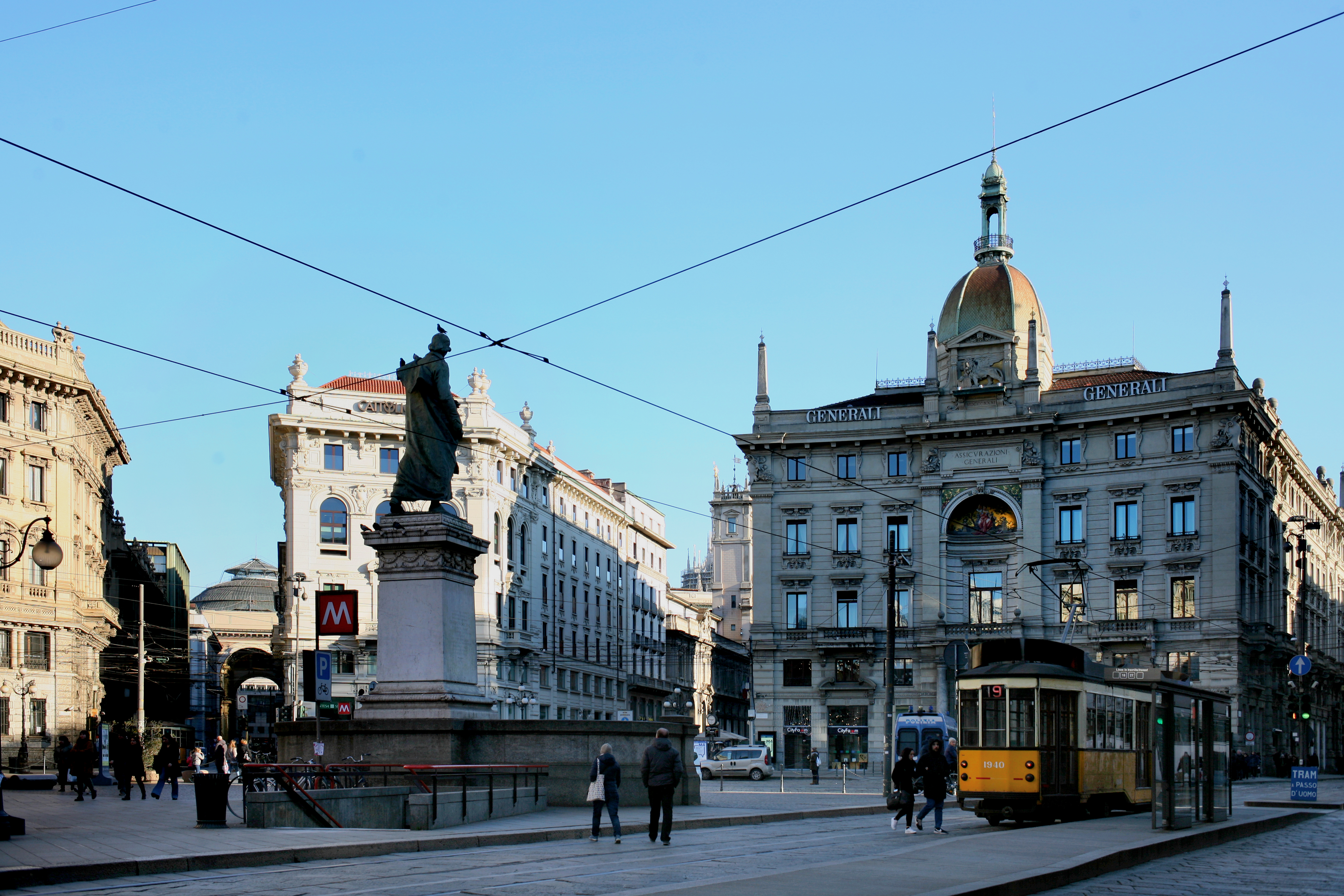
- Location: Milan, Italy
- Interactive map of Piazza Cordusio

Piazza Cordusio (also informally referred to as Piazzale Cordusio) is a square in central Milan, Italy. The piazza takes its name from the Cors Ducis (Ducal court) which was located on the square during Longobard times. It is well known for its several turn-of-the-19th-century Neoclassical, eclectic and Art Nouveau buildings, banks and post offices. Even though many of these have now relocated elsewhere, it is still an important commercial square in the city and hosts the Palazzo delle Assicurazioni Generali (Palace of the Assicurazioni Generali), the Palazzo del Credito Italiano (Palace of the Credito Italiano) and the Palazzo delle Poste (Palace of the Post Office), former Borsa di Milano (former Milan Stock Exchange). Piazzale Cordusio hosts the Cordusio metro station and is the starting point of the elegant pedestrian Via Dante which leads to the imposing medieval Castello Sforzesco, or Milan Castle. Opposite to Via Dante, Cordusio borders onto Piazza Mercanti, former city centre in the Middle Ages, which leads directly to Piazza del Duomo, today's city centre.

== Notable buildings ==
- Palazzo delle Assicurazioni Generali (1897-1901): main building in the square, designed by Luca Beltrami . It housed the main headquarters of the mega-finance corporation Assicurazioni Generali. It has a small tower with a dome.
- Palazzo del Credito Italiano (1901): a semi-circular eclectic building, was designed by Luigi Broggi.
- Palazzo Broggi, or Palazzo delle Poste (1901): Another semi-circular building similar in style to that of the Credito Italiano, and also designed by Luigi Broggi and completed in 1901. It was the old stock exchange of Milan, until it was transferred to the more modern Palazzo Mezzanotte in Piazza Affari ("Business Square"). After having hosted the main post office in Milan, currently it hosts the first Starbucks Reserve Roastery in Europe.
- Casa Broggi (1895): eclectic building at intersection of Via Dante and Meravigli, designed by Luigi Broggi and a young Giuseppe Sommaruga. While the base has a rusticated simplicity, upper levels become more decorative.
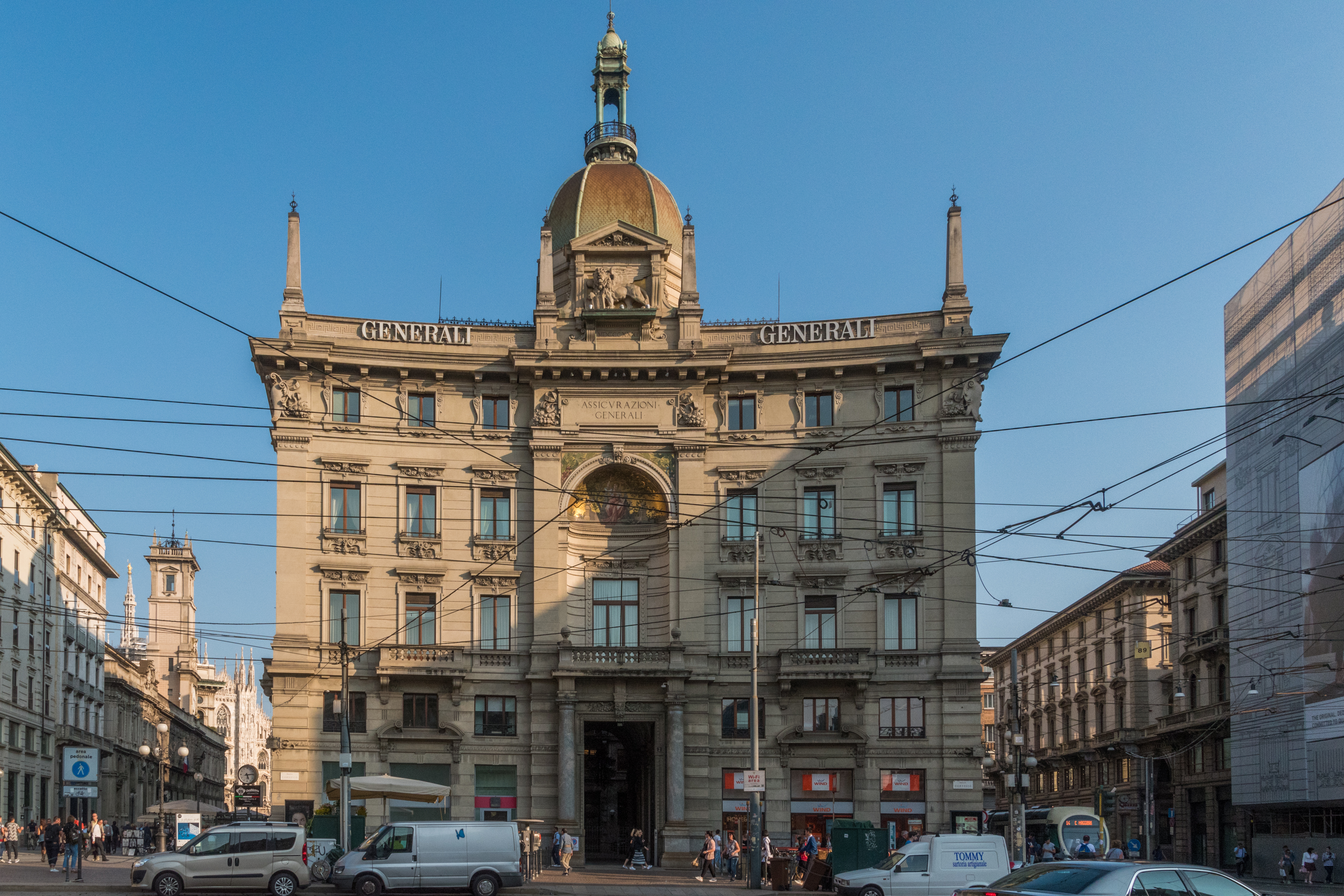
Palazzo delle Assicurazioni Generali

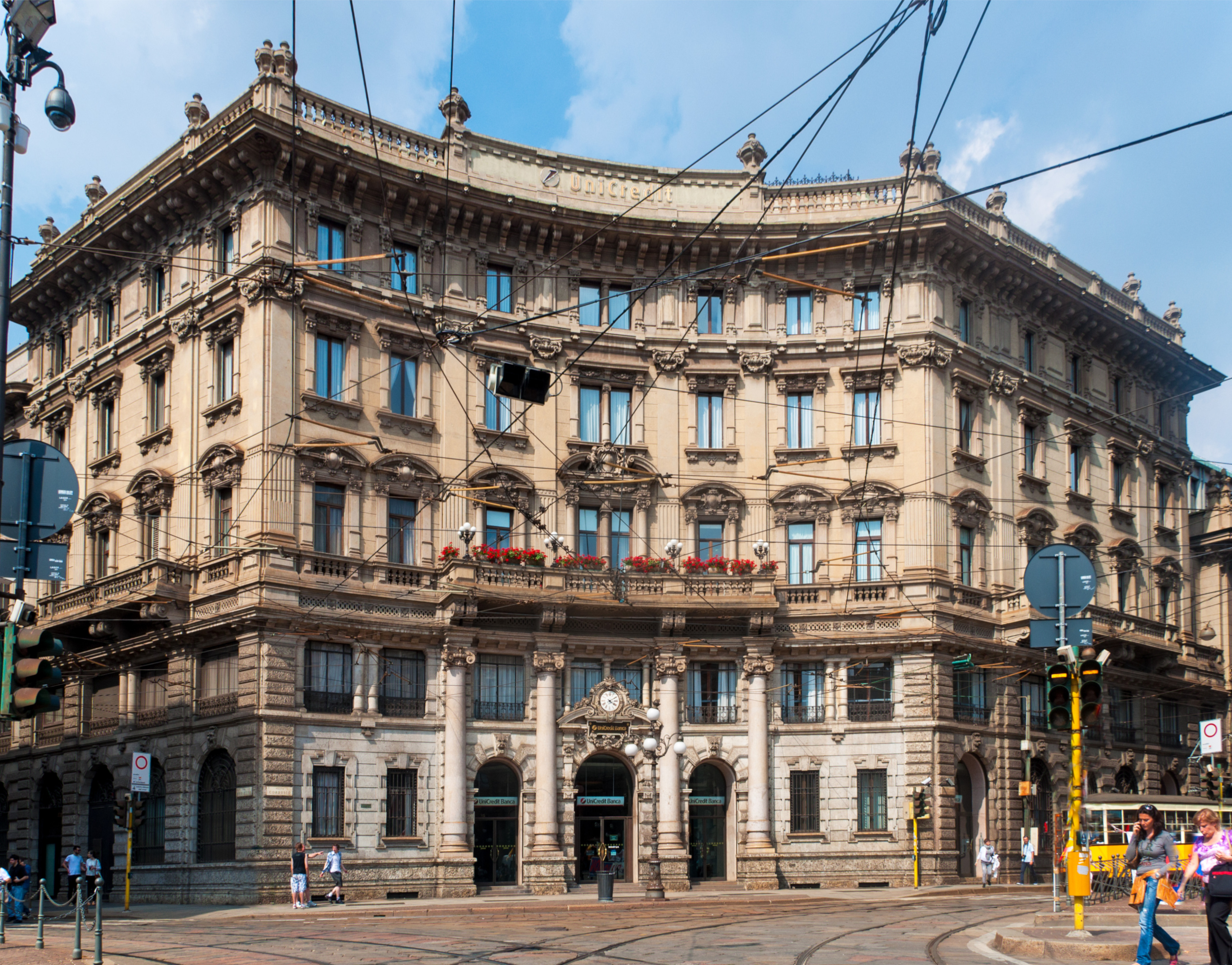
Palazzo del Credito Italiano

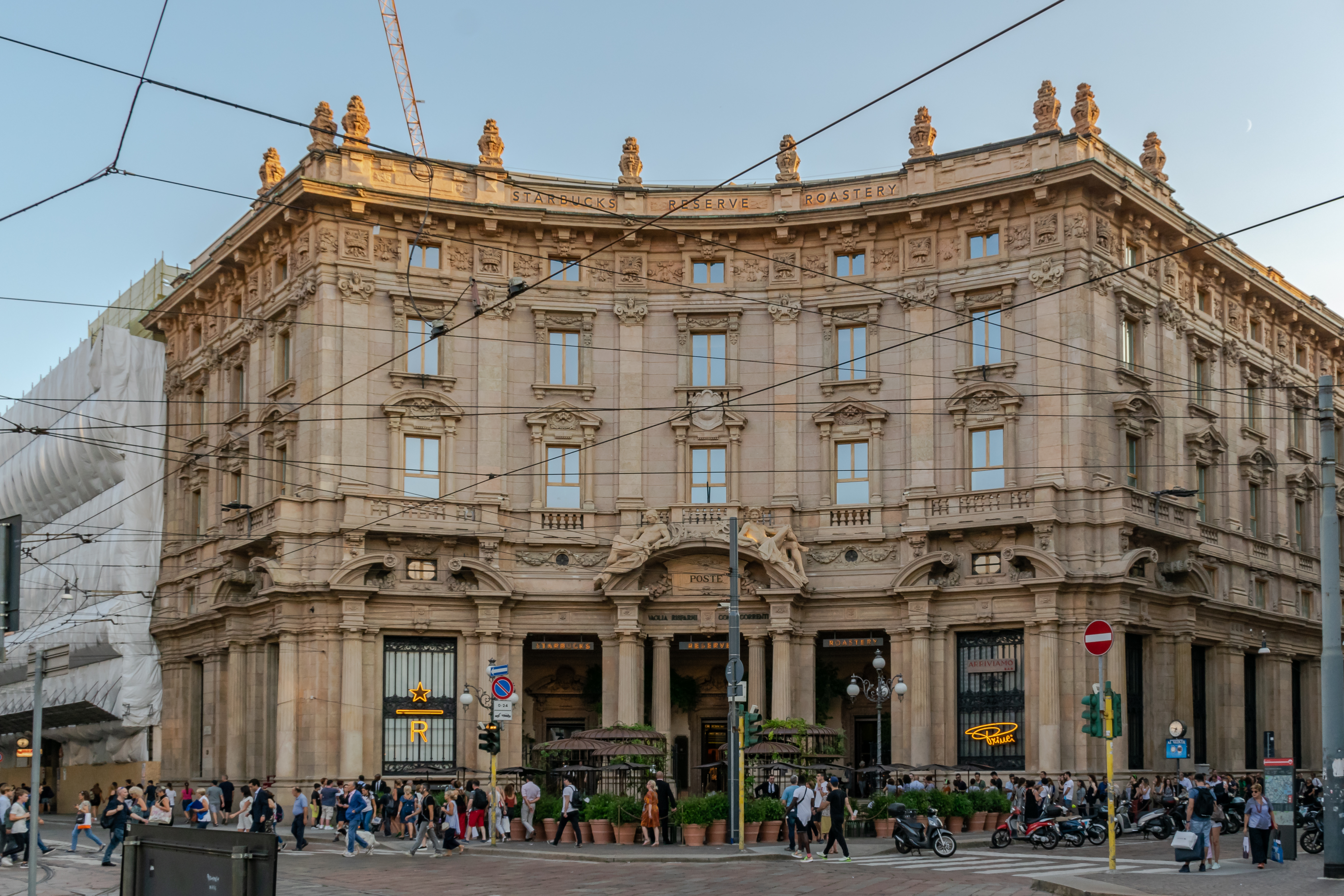
Palazzo delle Poste

== Monuments ==
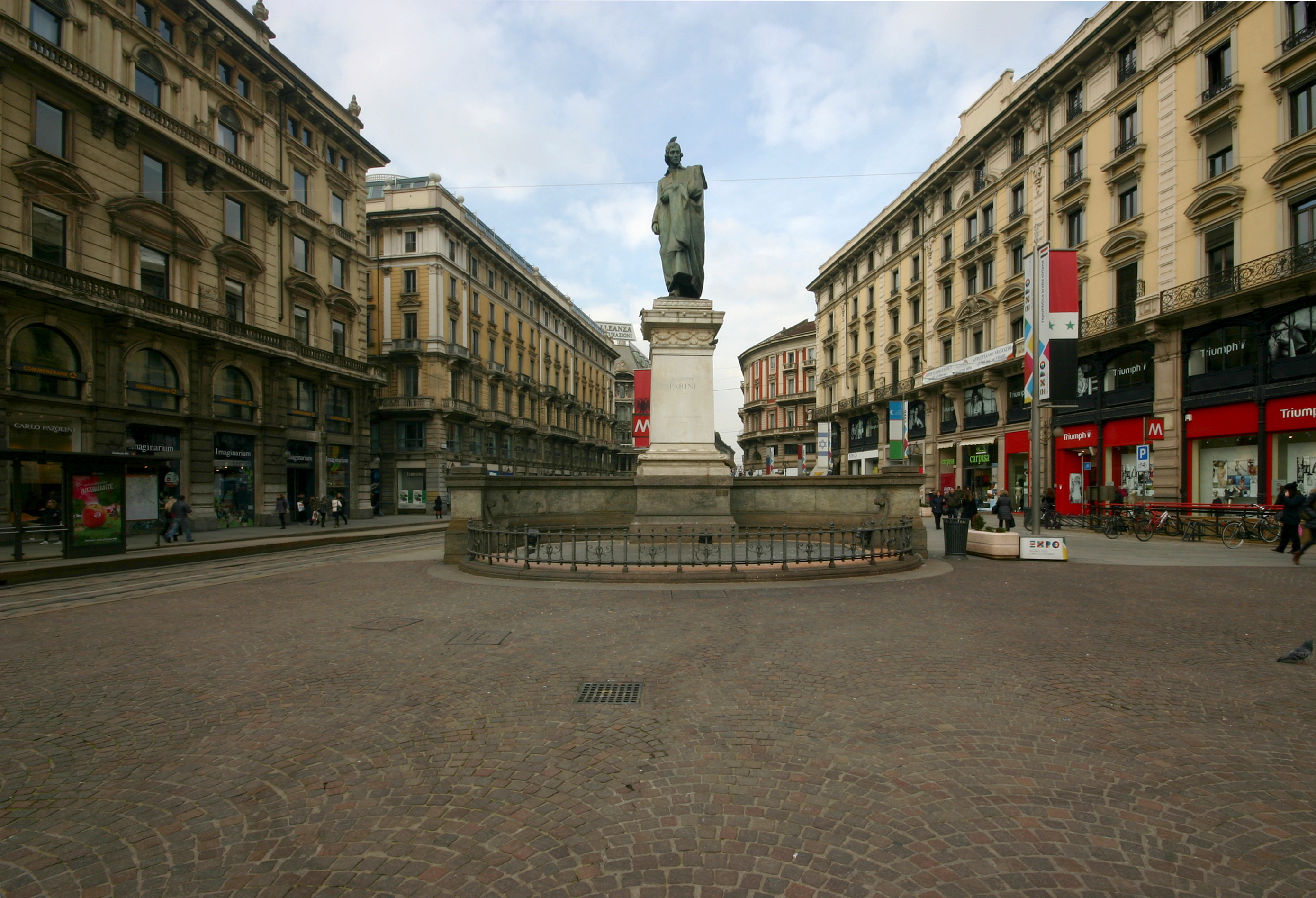
Monument to Parini.

=== Monumento a Giuseppe Parini ===
This is a metal and stone statue which stands in the middle of the piazzale and is meant to depict the great literary figure Giuseppe Parini (1729-1799). It was constructed by Luca Beltrami (1854-1933).
