= Campo dei Fiori =

Campo dei Fiori may refer to:

- Campo de' Fiori, a square in Rome
- Campo de' fiori (The Peddler and the Lady), a 1943 Italian film
- Campo dei Fiori di Varese, a mountain in Italy
