= Eugenio Gerli =

Italian architect and designer (1923–2013)

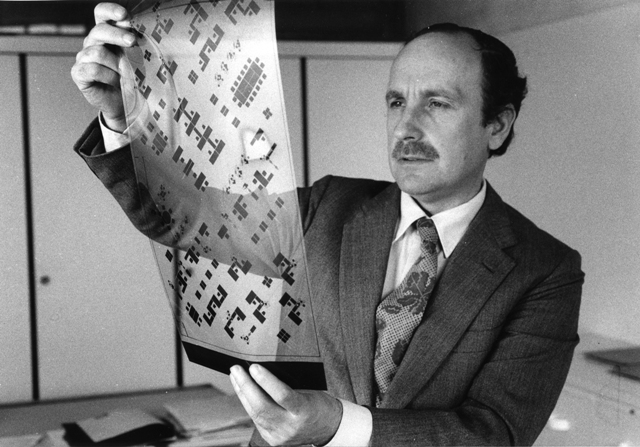
- Born: 15 July 1923; Milan, Italy
- Died: 2 October 2013 (aged 90); Milan, Italy
- Education: Liceo Classico A. Manzoni Politecnico di Milano
- Occupation: Architect
- Awards: XIII Triennale di Milano Gold Medal (1964)
- Design: Rima P75; Butterfly table T92; P 28 Tecno; Jamaica B106; Graphis System; PS142 Clamis

Eugenio Gerli (15 July 1923 – 2 October 2013) was an Italian architect and designer. In an intense working life spanning more than six decades, Eugenio Gerli explored many different areas of his profession. He built villas, apartment blocks, office blocks, factories, banks and stores, and also restored historic buildings. He often completed his works with custom-made interiors and furniture.This diverse range of projects inspired his industrial design and today many have become icons, like the S83 chair, the PS 142 armchair Clamis, the Jamaica cabinet and the Graphis System.

== Biography ==
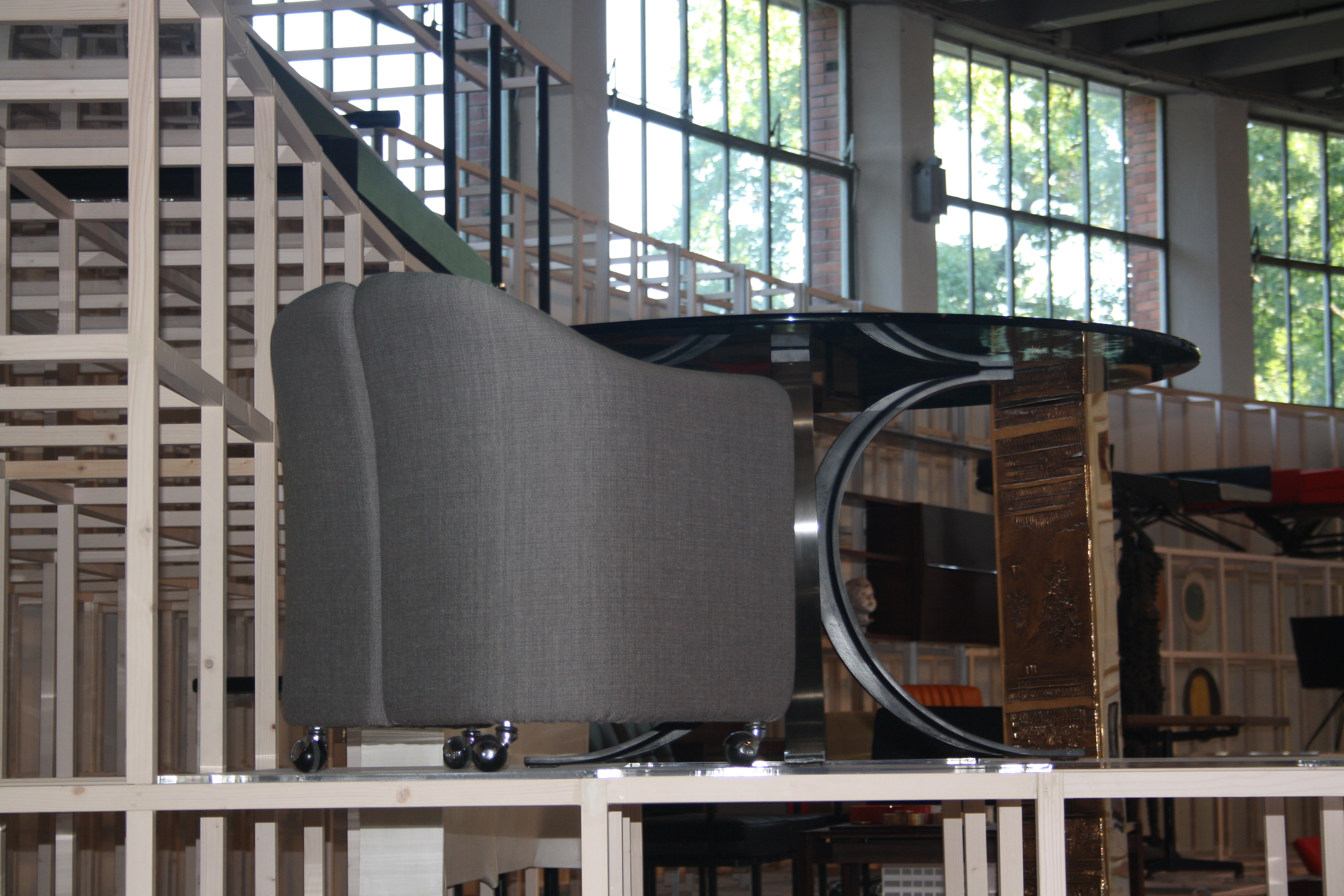
PS 142 Clamis -Armchair-1969 and T69 Table-1963

Eugenio Cesare Gerli was born on 15 July 1923 in Milan; his father Guido (London 1892 - Milan 1987) was an English businessman. His mother Luciana Chiesa was the daughter of Eugenio Chiesa (Milan, 18 November 1863 - Giverny, 22 June 1930).

Eugenio Chiesa, Republican Member of Parliament, from 1922 was firmly opposed to fascism. This caused the family all sort of difficulties, culminating in the exile of Eugenio Chiesa in 1926 and the arrest of Guido, later deported to various concentration camps in Italy.

Eugenio married Marta Somarè daughter of art critic Enrico Somarè and granddaughter of painter Cesare Tallone, forebear of a family of artists including the painter Guido Tallone, the editor and typographer Alberto Tallone and pianoforte builder Cesare Augusto Tallone.

After an initial two years at the Department of Engineering Eugenio switched to studying Architecture at the Milan Politecnico under Piero Portaluppi and Gio Ponti, both leading architects and designers. (graduated in 1949)

Eugenio Gerli integrated his spatial ideas with innovative solutions for custom-made designed interiors. This philosophy, together with his early studies in engineering, helped him in the development of models for industrial design

His early work was influenced by the works of Frank Lloyd Wright, Alvar Aalto and Charles Eames.

Eugenio Gerli also loved to create a strong bond between Architecture and visual arts, collaborating with artists like Arnaldo Pomodoro, Lucio Fontana, Blasco Mentor, Pietro Cascella, Guido Somarè.

The Exhibition at the Milan Triennale dedicated to Osvaldo Borsani (held from 16 May 2018- to 16 September 2018, designed by Lord Norman Foster and Tommaso Fantoni) included sixteen works of Architecture and Design by Eugenio Gerli. This paid homage to Gerli's work and represented an important contribution to the rediscovery of this "forgotten Master" (Marco Romanelli).

Eugenio's sons Enrico and Guido, both Architects, joined their father in the Studio in 1977 and worked together on all projects.

== Main architectural works ==
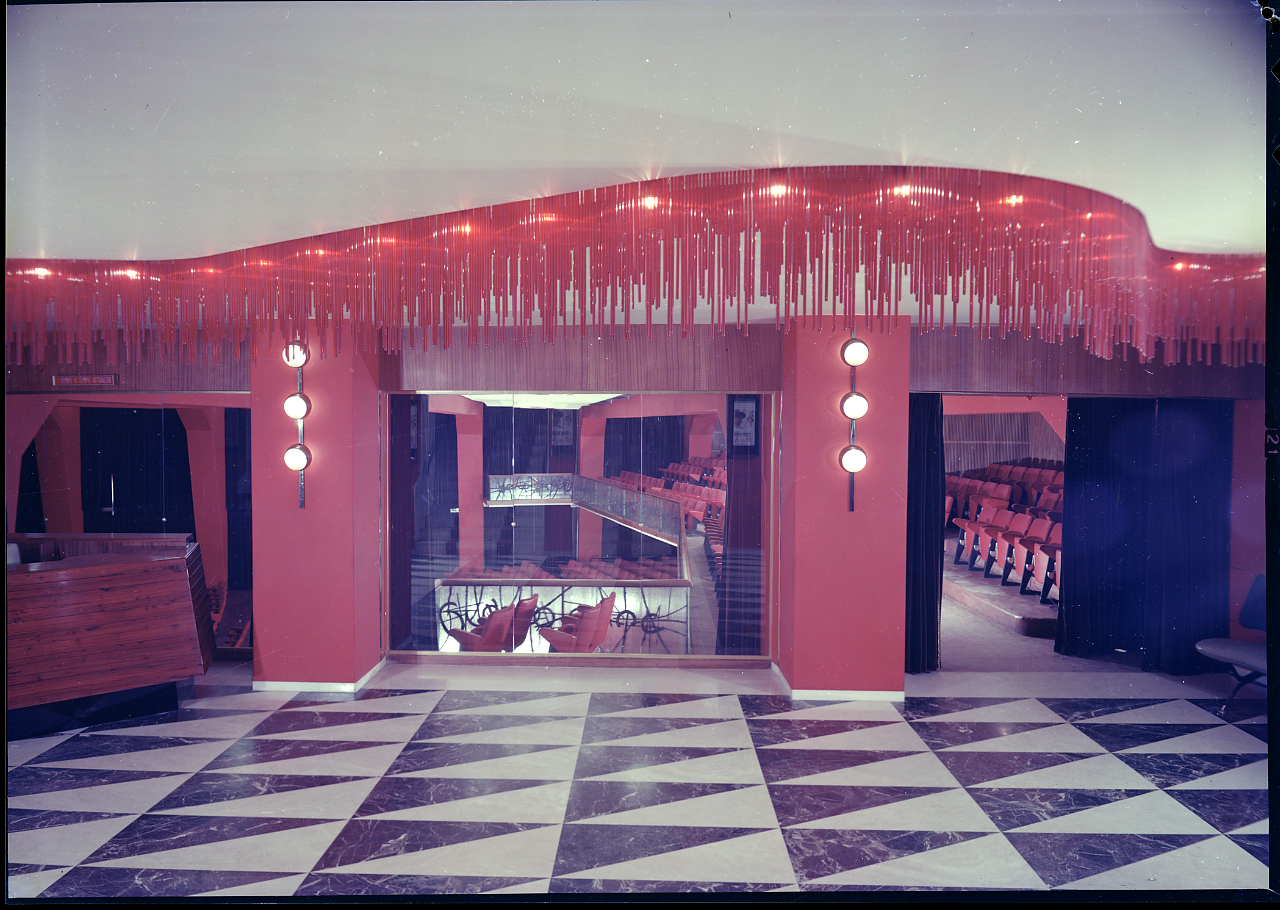
Cinema Ambasciatori, Milano (1954–1955). Photo by Paolo Monti.

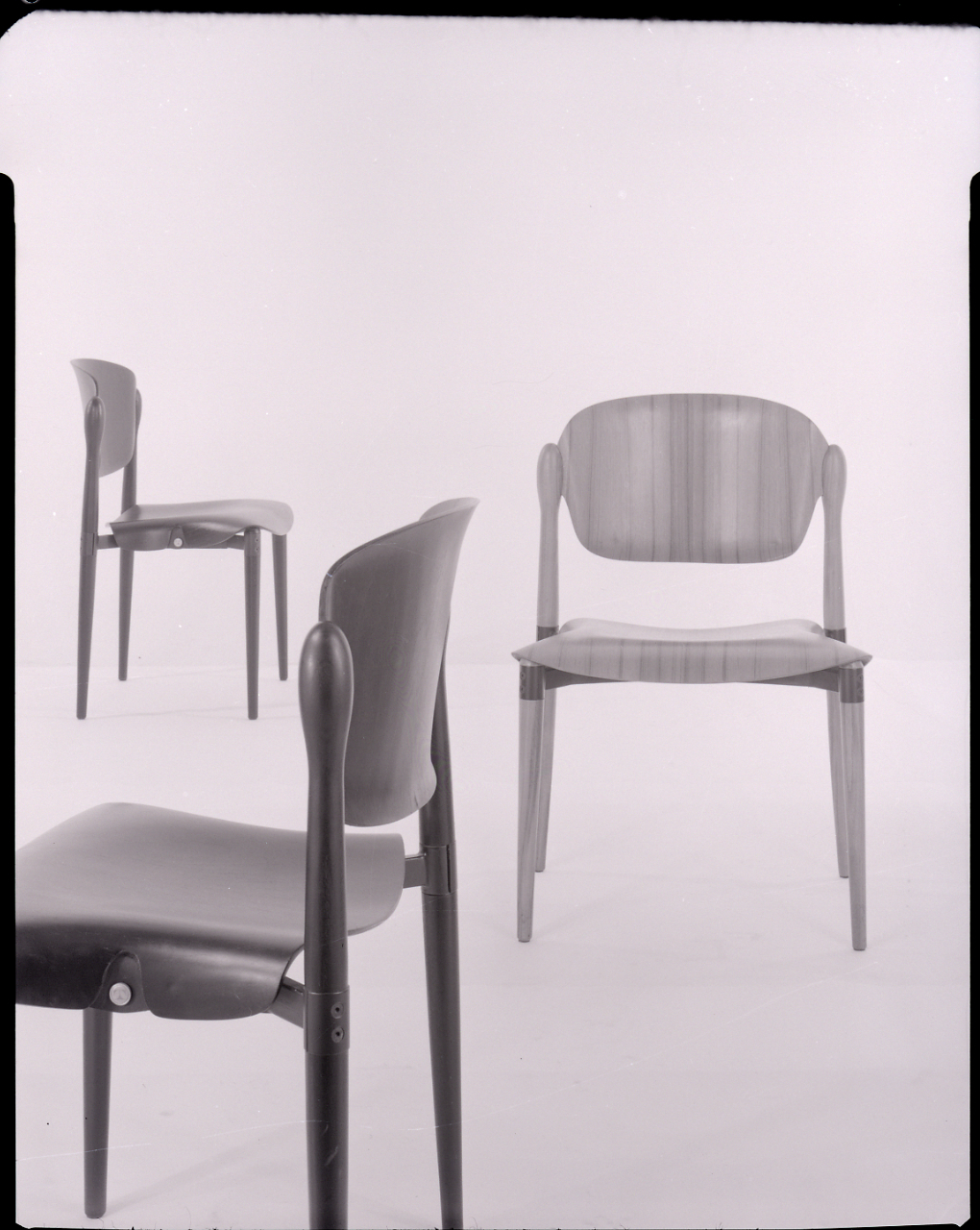
Stackable chair S83 Eugenio Gerli 1962

- 1950 - Cardiological Clinic Villa Adele Laveno-Mombello where (in collaboration with Mario Cristiani) he designs also the specific technical furniture. adjustable beds and reclining armchairs i
- 1954/55 - Ambasciatori Cinema in Milan, including all freestanding furniture as well as integrated lights.
- 1955 - Villa at Lago Maggiore - Portovaltravaglia
- 1956 - Villa Seralvo - Meda
- 1957 - Tecno flagship Store in via Montenapoleone - Milan - with transparent glass floors. Special Prize Formica Domus
- 1958 - Apartment for an art collectionist - via Mascagni - Milano
- 1959 - Apartment Block - viale Coni Zugna 23 - Milan
- 1962/63 - Horizontal Block of country villa-style apartments - Sirtori
- 1968/1972 - Restoration and extensions of Art Nouveau Palazzo Castiglioni, Headquarters of Confcommercio (Unione Commercio e Turismo) Palazzo Castiglioni (1903) - Corso Venezia 49 - Milan
- 1972 - New Office Block for Headquarters of Confcommercio (Unione Commercio e Turismo) - via Marina - Milan
- 1970 - Restaurant El Toulà - Milan
- 1971 - Villa Gatti - La Pinetina - Appiano Gentile (Como)
- 1972 - Club House – Golf Club La Pinetina - Appiano Gentile (Como)
- 1972 - Villa Orlando - La Pinetina - Appiano Gentile (Como)
- 1973 - Villa Casale - La Pinetina - Appiano Gentile (Como)
- 1974 - Villa Colombo - La Pinetina - Appiano Gentile (Como)
- 1962 and 1974 - Headquarters and Factories for Tecno S.p.A. (with Osvaldo Borsani) - Varedo - (Monza/Brianza)
- 1974 - Palazzo ARBO - via Bigli 22 - Milan
- 1974/78 - Tecno S.p.A. stores in Milan, Rome, Turin, Paris, Naples
- 1976/77 - ETRO S.p.A. Headquarters - via Spartaco - Milan
- 1978 - Penthouse Dome (with Osvaldo Borsani) - Riyadh - SA
- 1978 - Canteen for Breda Fucine Factory - Sesto San Giovanni (Milano)
- 1979 - Villa Flenda - La Pinetina - Appiano Gentile (Como)
- 1982 - Project for EUR Rome Headquarters of Confcommercio (Unione Commercio e Turismo) - (with Arch. Enrico Gerli) - Rome
- 1983 - Villa Bonomi in Castel d'Agogna (Pavia)
- 1983 - New Office Block for Banca Popolare della Murgia - (with Arch. Enrico Gerli) - Gravina (Bari)
- 1984/88 - ETRO Interior Store via Pontaccio - Milan
- 1985 - New Office Block for Banca Popolare della Murgia - Corato (Bari)
- 1987 - Project for Villa Koskotas on the hills of Athens
- 1987/90 - ETRO Flagship Store - via Montenapoleone - Milan
- 1988 - Perfumery ETRO via Verri - Milan
- 1988 - New Headquarters for Enasco - via del Melangolo - Rome
- 1990 - New Headquarters for ETRO S.p.A. - via Spartaco - Milan
- 1998 - Private apartment - Monza
- 1976/2000 - ETRO Stores in London, Paris, New York, Rome, Singapore, Los Angeles
- 2003 - Parlamentino (Small Parliament) - for Confcommercio (Unione Commercio e Turismo) - corso Venezia 49 Milan
- 2002/2004 - New Offices - Istituto Centrale delle Banche Popolari - via Cavallotti 14 / via Verziere 11- Milano

== E.G. Designer ==
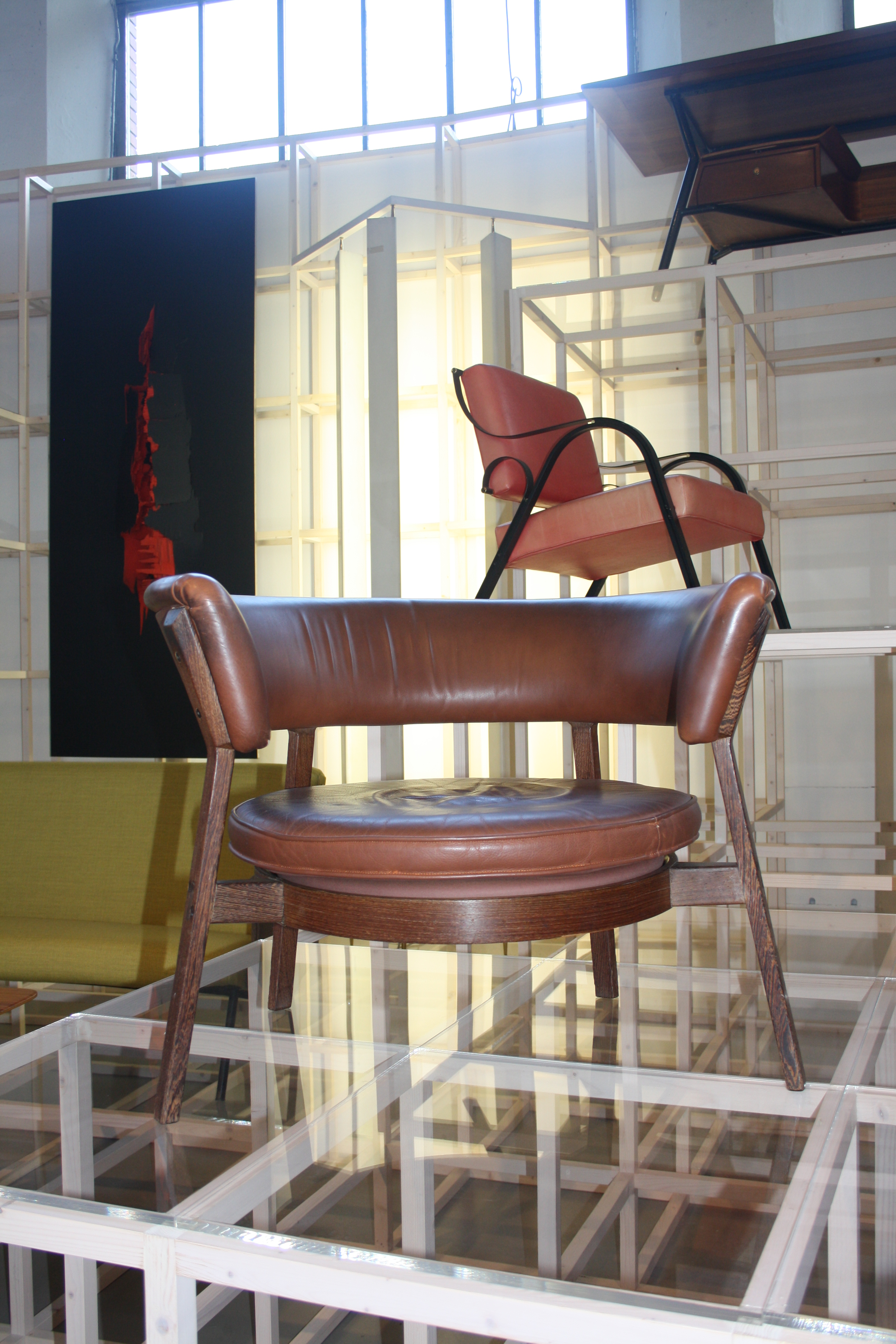
Armchair P28 - 1958

Although Eugenio believed he was first and foremost an architect, today, he is remembered primarily for his furniture design. Some of his projects have become design classics and stand in some of the world's most important collections, including the Triennale di Milano, the Centre Pompidou, the MAD Musée des Arts Décoratifs located in the Palais du Louvre's western wing and the Stedelijk Museum in Amsterdam.

As a student, he started experimenting with the use of plywood. He took part in an exhibition at Fede Cheti with an all-plywood chair with three legs.

In 1949, he founded a workshop named "Forma" for the series production of experimental prototypes.

In 1950–52, he worked in collaboration with Mario Cristiani in Cardiological Clinic Villa Adele in Laveno- Mombello, to design general layout and specific technical furniture: adjustable beds and reclining armchairs for medical applications.

From 1952 to 1954, in addition to projects with plywood and "traditional" materials, he began researching and experimenting with a special resin-structured felt.

In 1954, four models "Forma" either in felt or plywood were presented at the X Triennale in the section put on by Franco Albini. In 2007, two of the models were selected for the permanent Triennale Collection.

From 1954 to 1956 designed innovative seats for Padua firm Rima including:

- Small Armchair Rima P28 with a metal structure seat with crossing leather stripes, chairback and armrests made of a continuous veneer plywood structure.
- Model P 75 - with Mario Cristiani - revolving small armchair with fusion metal base and car-industry derived rubber revolving hinge joint.
- Sofas with plastic felt backs for atria of Cinema Ambasciatori.

In 1957, he started a long collaboration with Tecno S.p.A. designing many classical "icons" like the famous GRAPHIS, the " Copernican Revolution" a complete modular system for offices, the small Armchair PS142 Clamis, made of two specular twin bodies, the circular Armchair P28, the Chair S83, the " Butterfly" extendable Table T92, the nut-shell Cocktail Cabinet Jamaica.

== Selected industrial design works ==
- 1956 Butterfly extendable Table with Mario Cristiani - Prize at Fòrmica-Domus competition (re-disegned by Gerli and produced by Tecno with the name T92 in year 1960)
- 1957 Bed made of intersecting planes - Prize at Formica-Domus competition.
- 1957 Bent plywood dismountable Chair - S3 Tecno (Prototype Gerli 1951).
- 1958 Armchair P28 (Trecentosessanta) based on circle
- 1962 Series of dismountable Chairs S81- S82- S83
- 1963 Coulisse Table T97
- 1963 Table T68 : top made with exchangeable elements (with Osvaldo Borsani)
- 1963 Tables T69-T102 with jointed fusion central base (with Osvaldo Borsani)
- 1963 "Servomuto" revolving Trays
- 1963 Bed L79 (with Osvaldo Borsani)
- 1964 TableT87 two heights Table with different aesthetics (Gold medal at XIII Triennale di Milano)
- 1965 Bookcase E101 Domino - the getting over the fixed piece of furniture with five modular and linear elements: the beginning of an experiment with volumes, colors and planes that will lead to the revolutionary project GRAPHIS (1967)
- 1965 Sofa and Armchair D/P73 Sir
- 1966 Bar Cabinet B106 Jamaica - nut shell inspired
- 1966 Armchair and Sofa P104 and D104 Jacqueline
- 1967 Bed L108 Holland
- 1967 GRAPHIS SYSTEM – production 1968 (with Osvaldo Borsani) - the getting over the fixed piece of furniture with only 2 elements to be freely planned (Patented May 16/1972 US3663079 A)
- 1969 Revolving bedside Table T128 Revolver
- 1968 Plastic small Easy Chair - Margherita
- 1969 Upholstered Armchair PS 142 Clamis made of two specular twin bodies (Patented July 18 -1972 - US D224285 S)
- 1969 Vases L1- L2- L3
- 1975 Bookshelves with sliding glasses E333
- 1979 Series P/D 225 - Fixed or modular sofas with wooden structural corners (with Enrico Gerli)
- 1984 Office Armchairs P131 (with Guido Gerli)
- 1985 Armchair P121 with reclining back (with Enrico Gerli)
- 1988 Office Armchairs Aries E, M, O (with Guido Gerli and Centro Progetti Tecno)

== Awards ==
- Prize at Fòrmica - Domus competition 1956 - Butterfly Table (with Mario Cristiani)
- Prize at Fòrmica-Domus competition 1957 - Bed made of intersecting planes
- Special prize at Vis Securit-Domus competition 1960 - Tecno Flagship Store via Montenapoleone with transparent glass floors
- Gold medal XIII Triennale di Milano - 1964 - TableT87
- Selection Compasso d'Oro 1970 - Graphis System
- Selection Compasso d'Oro ADI 1970 - Table T92

== Bibliography ==
- Paul Bode (1957). KINOS. München: Georg D.W. Callwey.
- Roberto Aloi (1958). Architetture Per lo spettacolo, Esempi. Milano: Hoepli.
- new forniture / neue möbel. Vol. 7. Stuttgart: Verlag Gerd Hatje. 1964.
- Filippo Cagetti; Eugenio Gerli; Giorgio Keffer, Marco Valsecchi (1977). Il Commercio a Milano. Vol. 2. Unione Commercio e Turismo della provincia di Milano.
- Giuliana Gramigna (1985). 1950/1980 REPERTORIO: Immagini e contributi per una storia dell'arredo italiano. Arnaldo Mondatori Editore.
- Gramigna, Giuliana; Mazza, Sergio (2003). Repertorio del design italiano 1950-2000 per l'arredamento domestico (in Italian). Torino: U. Allemandi. ISBN 88-422-1158-3. OCLC 52329088.
- Giulia Berruti; Carlo Ratti (1988). Il compensato curvato. Rima. ISBN 88-85109-02-0. OCLC 32780857.
- Penny Sparke (1988). Italian Design: 1870 to the present. London: Thames & Hudson. ISBN 0-500-23531-7. OCLC 18988960.
- Giuliana Gramigna; Fulvio Irace [in Italian] (1992). Osvaldo Borsani. Roma: Leonardo De Luca. ISBN 88-7813-386-8. OCLC 82747833.
- Irene de Guttry; Maria Paola Maino (1992). Il Mobile Italiano degli anni '40 e '50. Bari: Laterza. ISBN 88-420-4088-6. OCLC 29183315.
- Silvio San Pietro; Paola Gallo (1994). Nuovi Negozi a Milano 2. Milano: L'Archivolto. ISBN 88-7685-068-6. OCLC 33039997.
- Silvio San Pietro; Paola Gallo (1994). Nuovi negozi in Italia 2 - New shops in Italy 2. Milano: L'Archivolto. ISBN 88-7685-069-4. OCLC 33039999.
- 45.63 Un museo del disegno industriale in Italia. Triennale di Milano. Abitare Segesta. 1995. ISBN 88-86116-12-8.
- Giuliana Gramigna, Paola Biondi, Il Design in Italia dell'arredamento domestico, Torino/London, Umberto Allemandi &C, 1999, ISBN 88-422-0839-6
- 55/06: Cinquant' anni di professione/La provincia di Milano e i suoi architetti. Milano: Mondadori, Electa. 2006. ISBN 88-370-4008-3. OCLC 860288136.
- Giampiero Bosoni (2011). Tecno: l'eleganza discreta della tecnica. Milano: Skira. ISBN 978-88-572-0983-8. OCLC 727704908.
- Giuseppe Drago; Jacopo Drago (2015). Gastone Rinaldi designer alla Rima. Capitolium Art. ISBN 978-88-941164-0-3. OCLC 1126379777.
- Giampiero Bosoni (2018). Osvaldo Borsani. Milano: Skira. ISBN 978-88-572-3670-4. OCLC 1037716486.
- Stefano Galli-Anty Pansera (2019). Milano anni '60. Milano: Milano in Mostra.
