= Villa Romeo Faccanoni =

Historic building in Milan, Italy

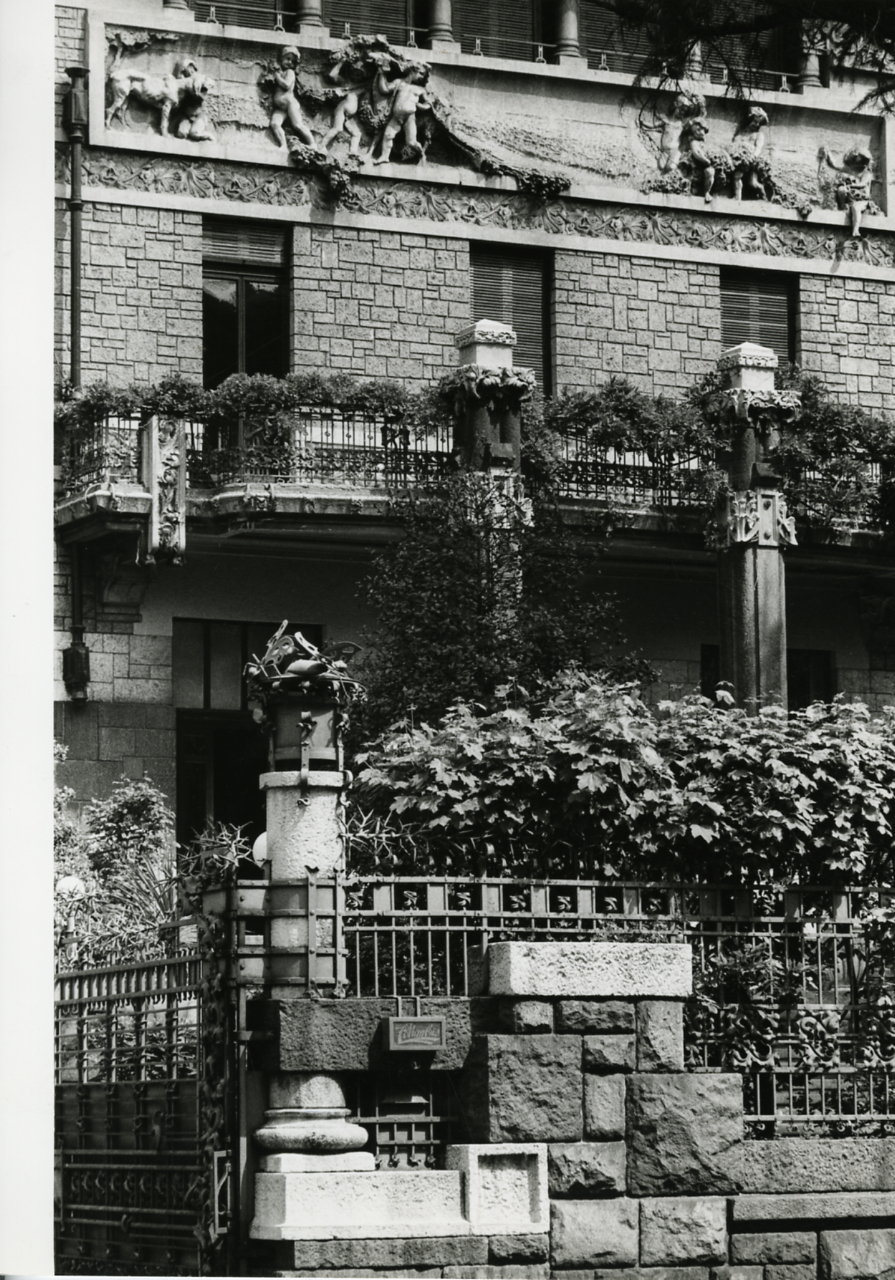
- Detail of facade entrance (photo 1969 by Paolo Monti)

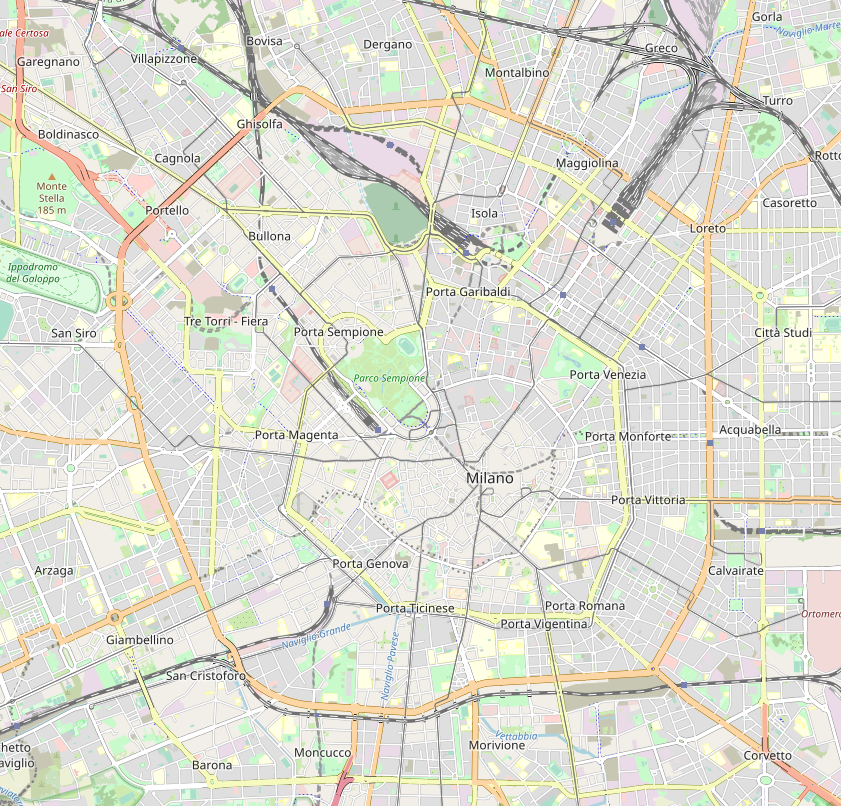
- Location within Milan Location within Italy

General information
- Architectural style: Liberty style or Art Nouveau
- Location: Via Michelagelo Buonarotti #48, Milan, Italy
- Coordinates: 45.47259°N 9.15581°E
- Completed: 1914

Design and construction
- Architect: Giuseppe Sommaruga

Villa Romeo Faccanoni is an Liberty style house located on Via Michelangelo Buonarroti #48 in the city of Milan, region of Lombardy, Italy. The three-story house, surrounded by a small garden, was designed by Giuseppe Sommaruga and built between 1912 and 1914. The expanded building now serves as the offices of the Clinica Columbus, with added surrounding clinic buildings erected in the former gardens.

The small villa or villino was commissioned by the engineer Luigi Faccannoni. The architect Sommaruga employed the decorators Eugenio Quarti and Alessandro Mazzucotelli to complete respectively the interior and exterior ornamentation. Also of note are two naked statues of women, sculpted by Ernesto Bazzaro, that had been installed at the entrance of the Sommaruga-designed Palazzo Castiglioni, but removed due to controversy. In 1919, the house was sold to the engineer-entrepreneur and car company founder Nicola Romeo. The home was converted under the direction of the architect Gio Ponti and the surgeon Mario Donati into a medical clinic in 1938-1940. Damaged by the bombardment of 1943, the clinic was inaugurated only in 1949.

The facade facing Via Michelangelo is rich with elaborate grills and metalwork by Mazzucotelli, who embellished light fixtures, garbage cans, and grills in balconies in vaguely floral designs. A four-story tower rises to the left of the entrance. The asymmetries of the design create a mannerist dynamism, almost fluid appearance, although the elements respect vertical and horizontal lines. The widening stairs at the entrance are marked in the center by two awkwardly rising dark stone column-monoliths that are barely linked to a second floor balcony. The facades is peppered by a mosaic of bas-reliefs depicting either floral elements or cherubs playfully arranging garlands. The asymmetric and staggered arrangement dispels their recognition as a frieze. The stone progresses from a darker and more rusticated base to a finer and but more polished stone brick work pattern, with rectangular stones of different sizes.
