= Campo dei Fiori di Varese =

Mountain in Italy

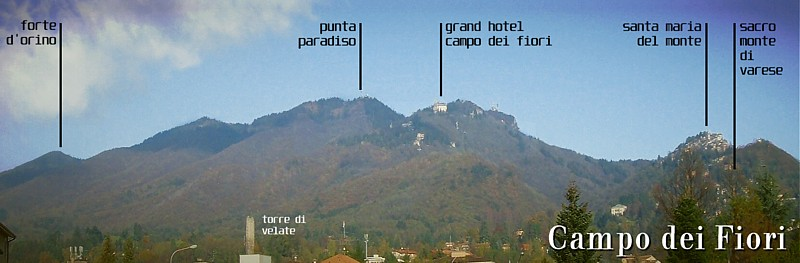

Highest point
- Elevation: 1,227 m (4,026 ft)(Punta di Mezzo)
- Coordinates: 45°52′12″N 8°46′12″E

Geography
- Location: Lombardy, Italy
- Parent range: Varese Prealps

Geology
- Mountain type: Calcarian

Campo dei Fiori di Varese is a mountain located in the northern part of Varese, Lombardy, Italy. It has an elevation of 1,227 metres (4,026 ft).

Overlooking the city of Varese and the homonymous lake, the Campo dei Fiori consists of a massif with several peaks, from west to east:

- Monte Morto, 724 metres (2,375 ft)
- Prà Camarée, 774 metres (2,539 ft)
- Punta di Orino, 1,139 metres (3,737 ft), where an old artillery battery known as Forte di Orino is located
- Punta Merigetto, 1,164 metres (3,819 ft)
- Punta di Mezzo, 1,227 metres (4,026 ft), the highest peak
- Punta Paradiso, 1,226 metres (4,022 ft), where a citadel of science and astronomical observatory named after Giovanni Schiaparelli are located
- Monte Tre Croci, 1,111 metres (3,645 ft)
- Monte Tre Crocette, 1,033 metres (3,389 ft), where the abandoned Grand Hotel Campo dei Fiori is located
- Monte San Francesco, 794 metres (2,605 ft), where the remains of an ancient convent are located
- Sacro Monte di Varese, 880 metres (2,890 ft), on top of which lie the hamlet of Santa Maria del Monte and the homonymous sanctuary
- Monte Pizzelle, 940 metres (3,080 ft)
- Monte Legnone, 865 metres (2,838 ft)

The Sacro Monte of Varese, built on one of the minor peaks of the Campo dei Fiori, is designated as a UNESCO World Heritage Site.

On the eastern side of the mountain, facing Varese, sits the now-vacant Grand Hotel Campo Dei Fiori. The Art Nouveau-style hotel was designed by Giuseppe Sommaruga and opened in 1910, but subsequently closed in 1968.

Between the end of October and the first week of November 2017, the park was the subject of arson that burned down around 60 acres of woodland. In October 2020, the pine forests near the top of the mountain suffered extensive damage as a result of Storm Alex.

The Vellone–Sacro Monte funicular links the Vellone valley to Santa Maria del Monte; a second funicular, linking the same valley to the former Grand Hotel Campo dei Fiori, has been abandoned since 1953.

The massif is protected by the Campo dei Fiori Regional Park, established in 1984, which is adjacent to the Cinque Vette Park.
