= Monte Tre Croci =

Mountain in Italy

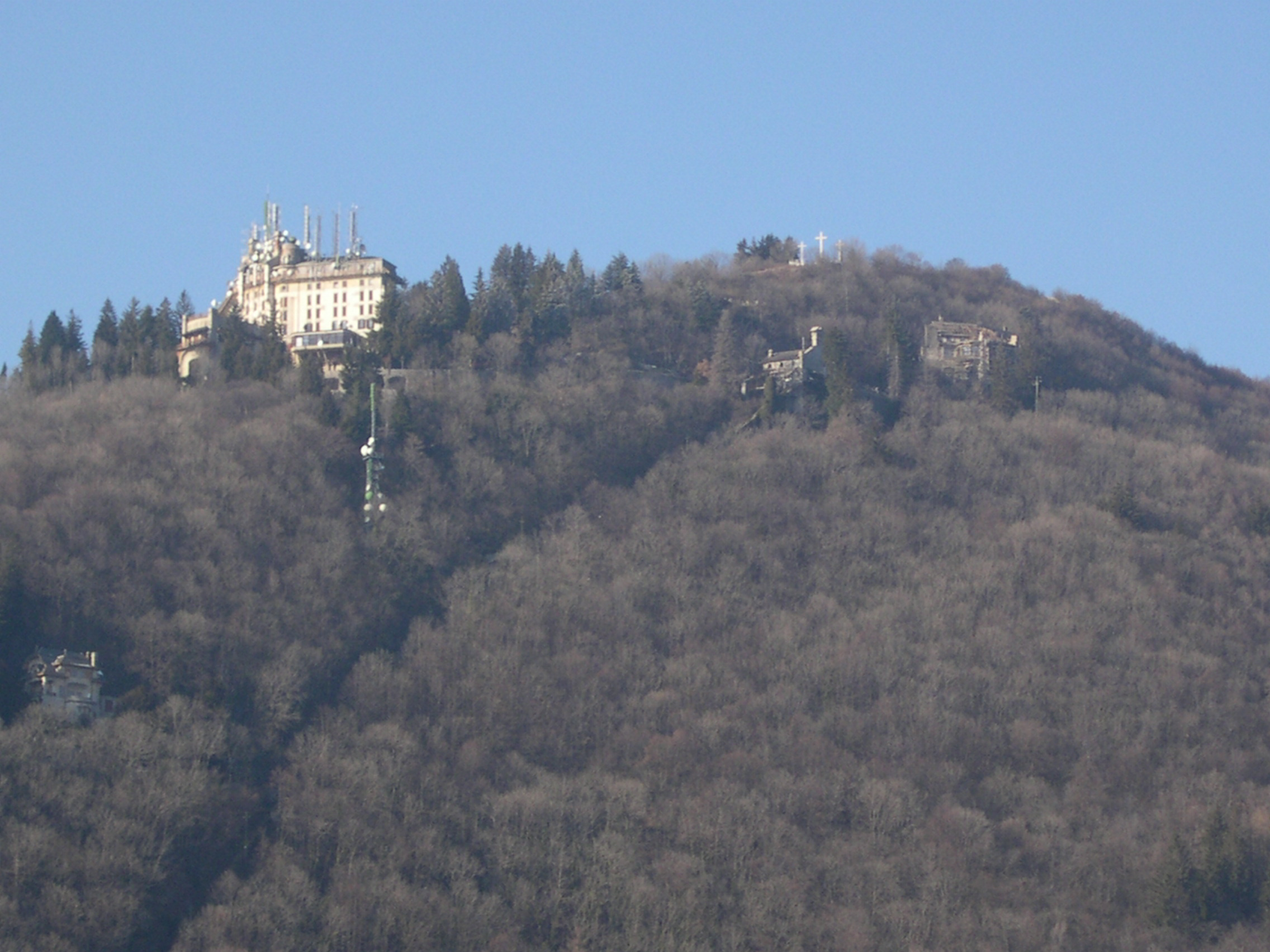
- The summit of Monte Tre Croci, with the abandoned Grand Hotel (left), the upper terminal of the funicular (right), and the three crosses (above the station)

Highest point
- Elevation: 1,111 m (3,645 ft)
- Coordinates: 45°51′59″N 8°46′51″E

Geography
- Location within Lombardy
- Location: Lombardy, Italy
- Parent range: Varese Prealps

Monte Tre Croci is one of the main peaks of the Campo dei Fiori massif in the Varese Prealps, Lombardy, Italy. It has an elevation of 1,111 metres (3,645 ft).

== Description ==
The peak derives its name ("Mount Three Crosses") from three large wooden crosses that had been placed near its top in 1636, replaced in 1900 by marble crosses and finally by concrete ones in 1974.

The Grand Hotel Campo Dei Fiori and the upper terminal of the Vellone-Grand Hotel Campo dei Fiori funicular, both abandoned (since 1968 and 1953, respectively), are located near its top.

Overlooking the city of Varese, Monte Tre Croci is frequently hiked owing to its easy access from the hamlet of Santa Maria del Monte, atop the Sacro Monte di Varese.
