= Grand Hotel Campo Dei Fiori =

Grand Hotel Campo dei Fiori
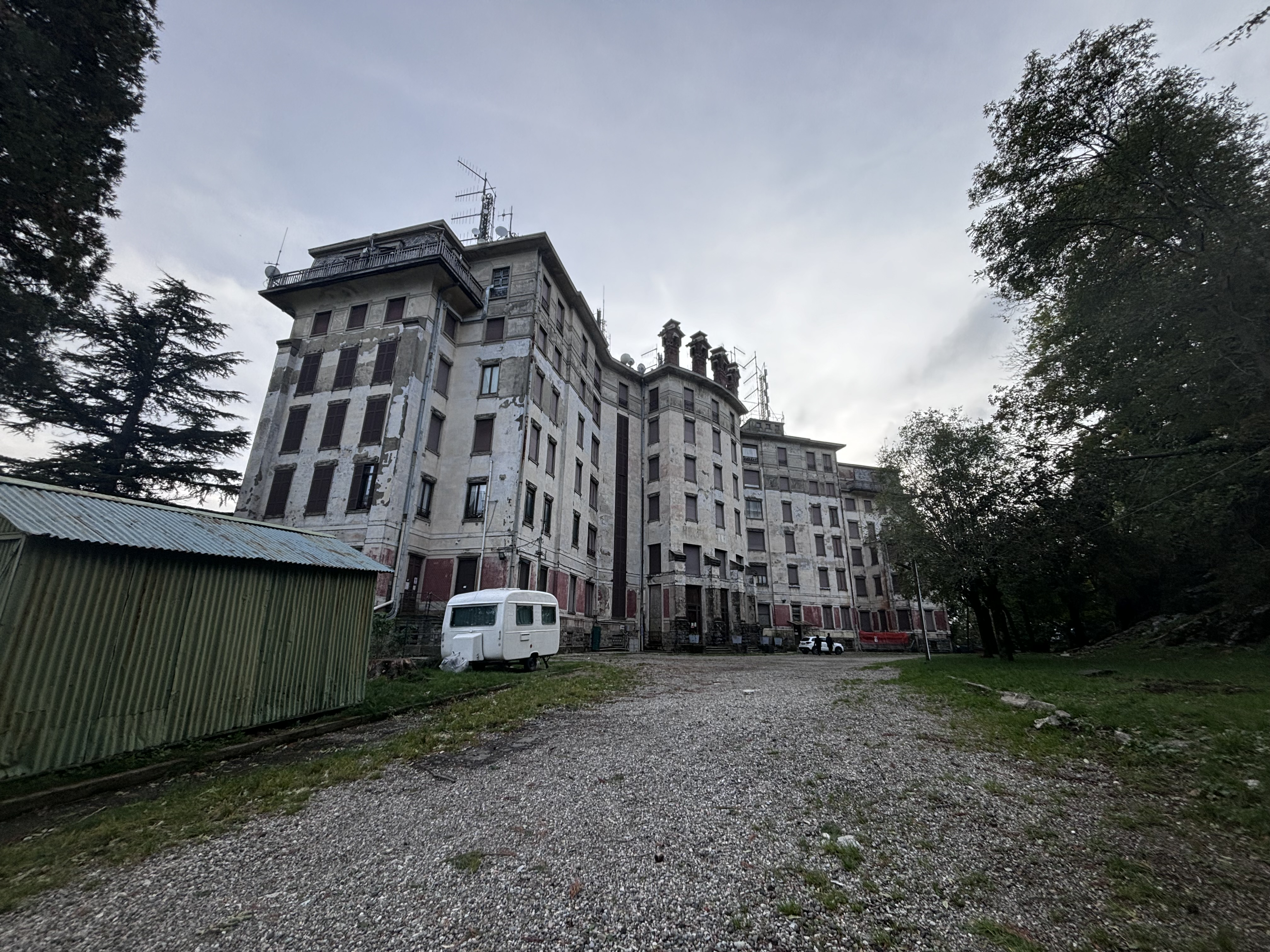
- The façade of the Grand Hotel Campo dei Fiori, October 2023

General information
- Status: Semi-abandoned
- Type: Hotel
- Architectural style: Liberty style
- Location: Varese, Italy
- Coordinates: 45.8631°N 8.7806°E
- Elevation: 1027 meters
- Construction started: 1910
- Opened: 1912
- Closed: 1968
- Owner: Finalba seconda s.p.a.

Technical details
- Floor count: 6

Design and construction
- Architect: Giuseppe Sommaruga
- Engineer: Impresa Piccoli

Other information
- Number of rooms: 256
- Number of restaurants: 2
- Number of bars: 1
- Facilities: Garden, Restaurant, Funicular station, Tennis courts (now demolished)

The Grand Hotel Campo dei Fiori is a hotel located on Monte Tre Croci, in Campo dei Fiori, Varese, Italy. It was designed by Giuseppe Sommaruga between 1908 and 1912. It is in the Art Nouveau style. It was closed in 1968. As of 2026, it is in a semi-abandoned state. It is opened two or three times a year by the FAI.

== History ==
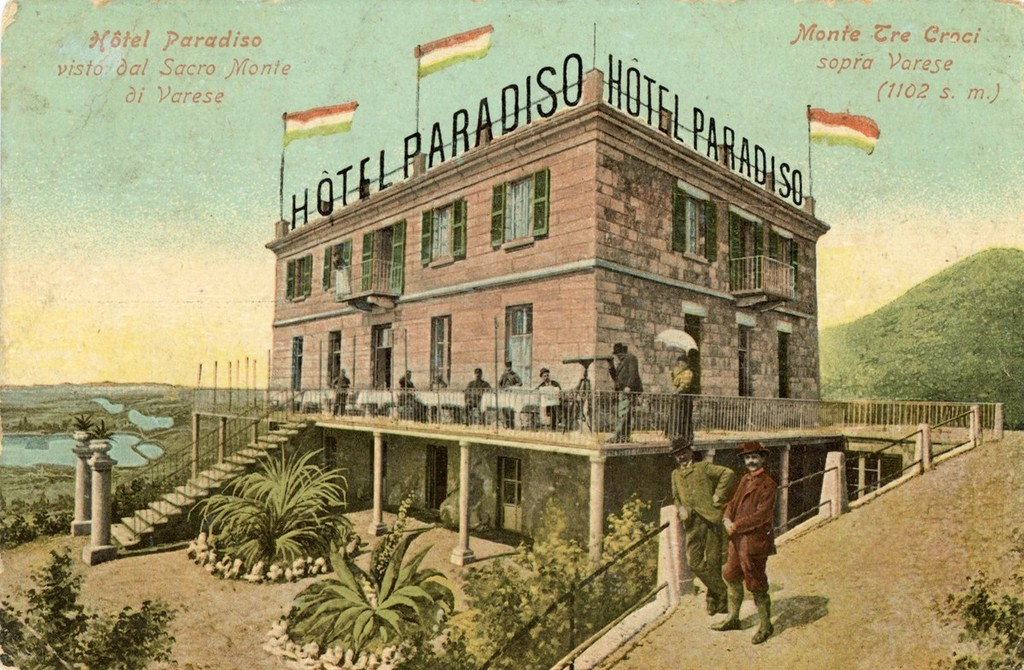
The Albergo Paradiso

Plans for a hotel on Campo dei Fiori began back in the late 1880s, and in 1894, the ‘Albergo Paradiso' opened.

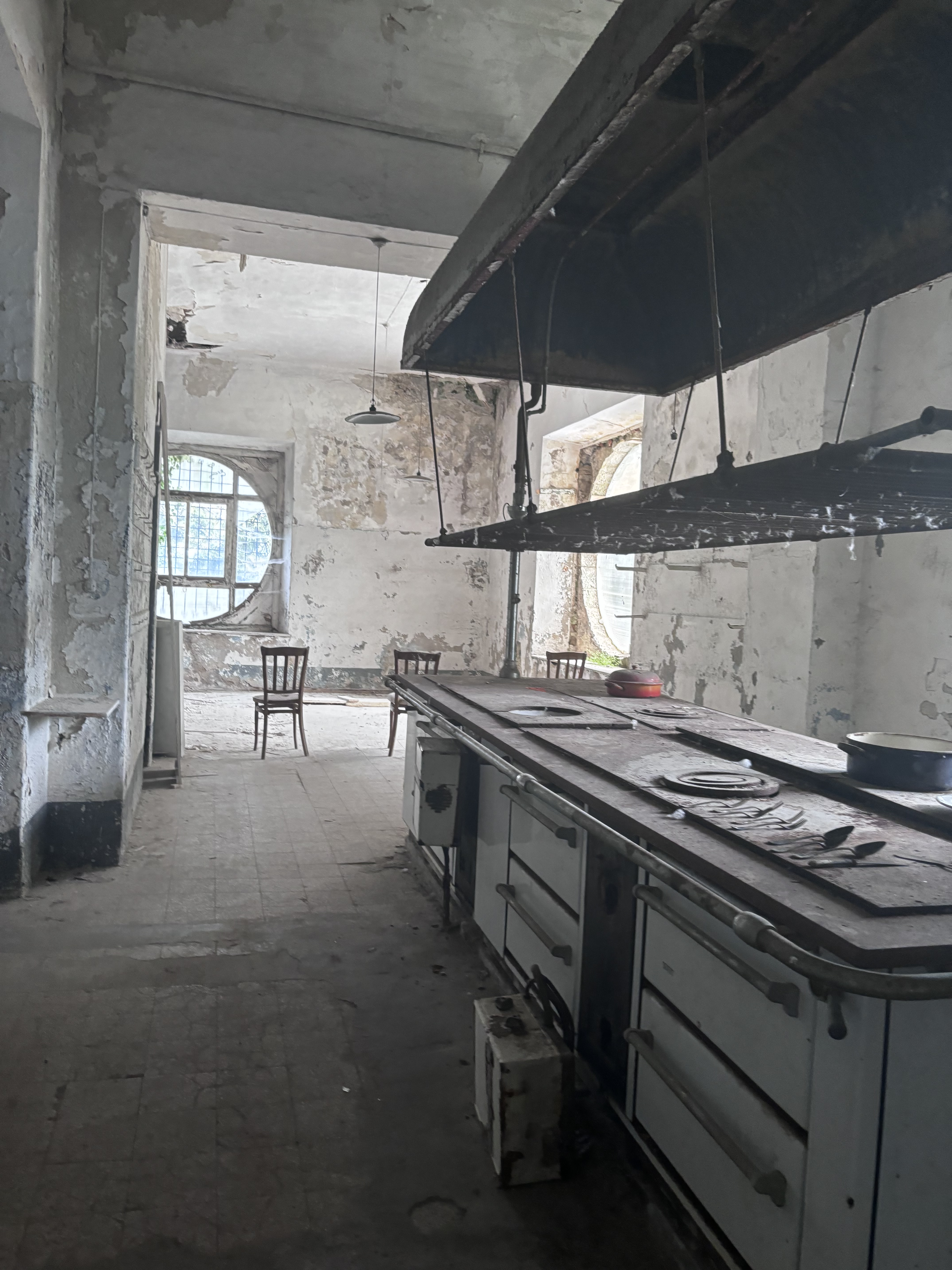
The Kitchen in 2024

There was also a small restaurant, opened by Carlo Ciotti in 1886. The hotel was situated where the current hotel is. Due to the hotels success, it was demolished to build the much larger and luxurious hotel, Grand Hotel Campo dei Fiori.

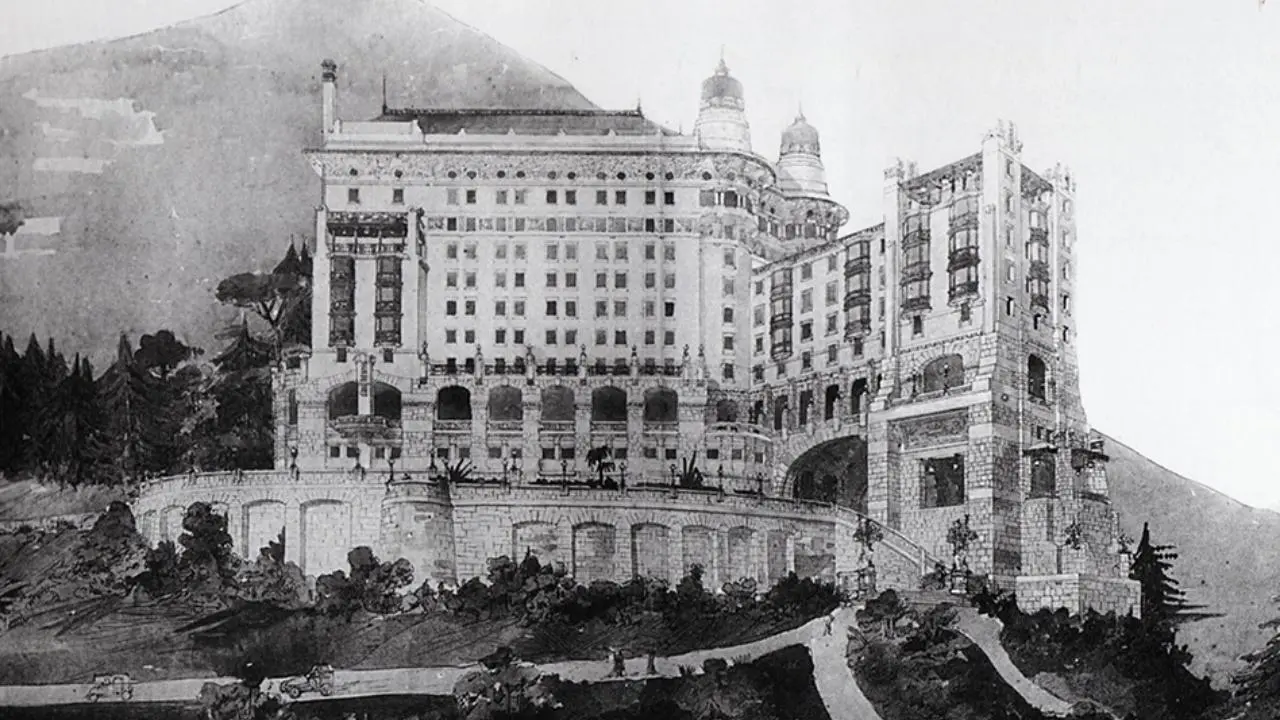
The original design of the hotel, 1908

Giuseppe Sommaruga started designs for the hotel in 1908, with construction beginning in 1910. The hotel officially opened in 1912. A restaurant (called Ristorante Belvedere) and funicular station were also constructed.

The restaurant in 2026

To construct the hotel they used items including mines and charges of dynamite to excavate the rock, and the overall operation profoundly changed the landscape of the area, as a vast garden was built around the buildings. After its opening, for about half a century the complex was a destination for a large influx of elite tourism, interrupted only by the two world wars. In 1944 it was used as a Military Hospital. In 1947 a fire devastated the top floor, which was hastily repaired with a prefabricated structure.

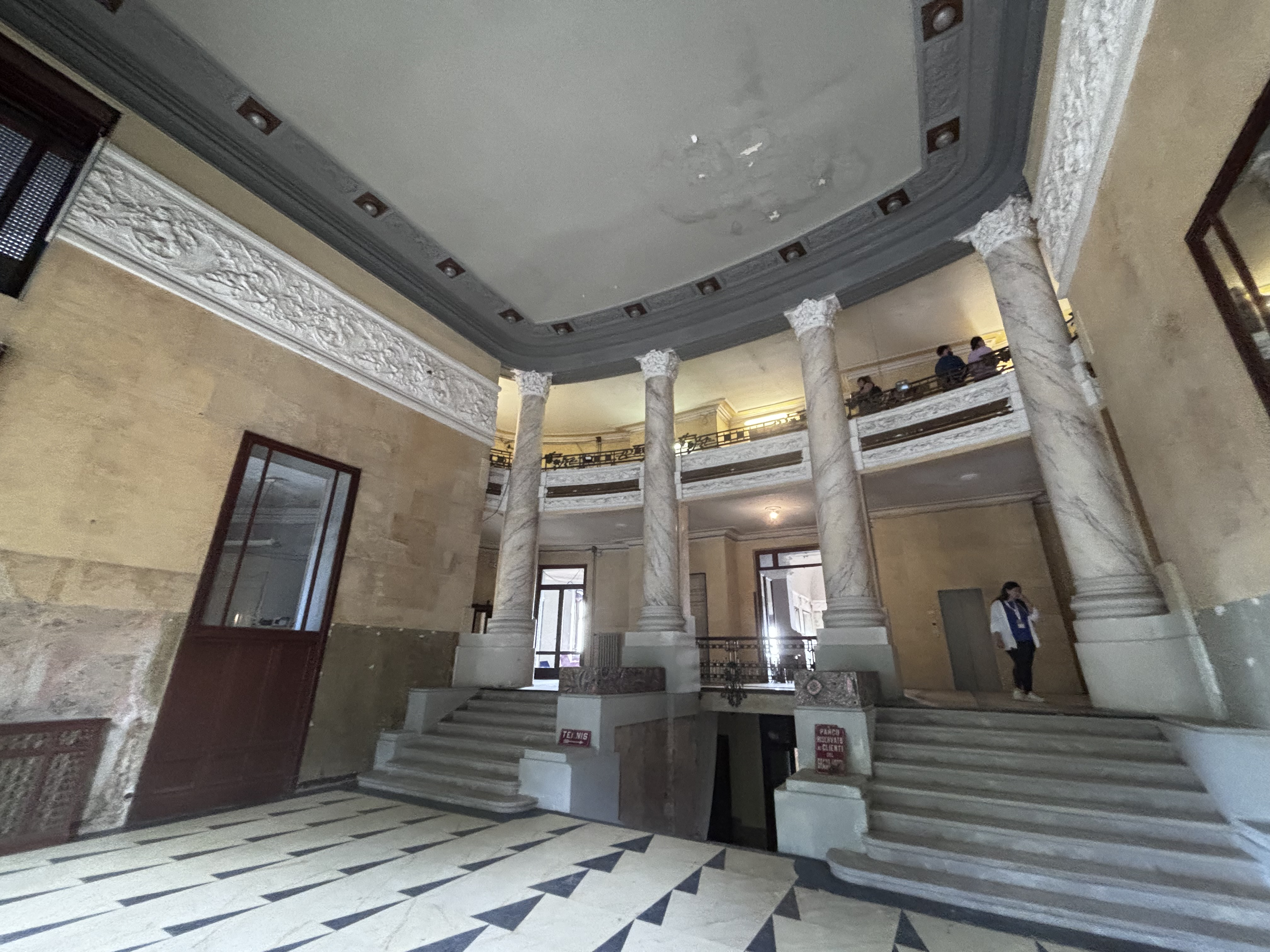
The Lobby in 2024

Over the next two decades, the hotel, aided by the total disinterest of the owners and the negligence of the janitors, was gradually stripped of many period pieces of furniture (some of enormous value), of which only a part was saved. Presumably around the 1980s (but there is a lack of reliable sources on this) the prefabricated mansard implanted in 1947 was replaced by a sturdier masonry roof covered with bituminous sheathing and copper foil (or similar material), and as of 2026 still present today.

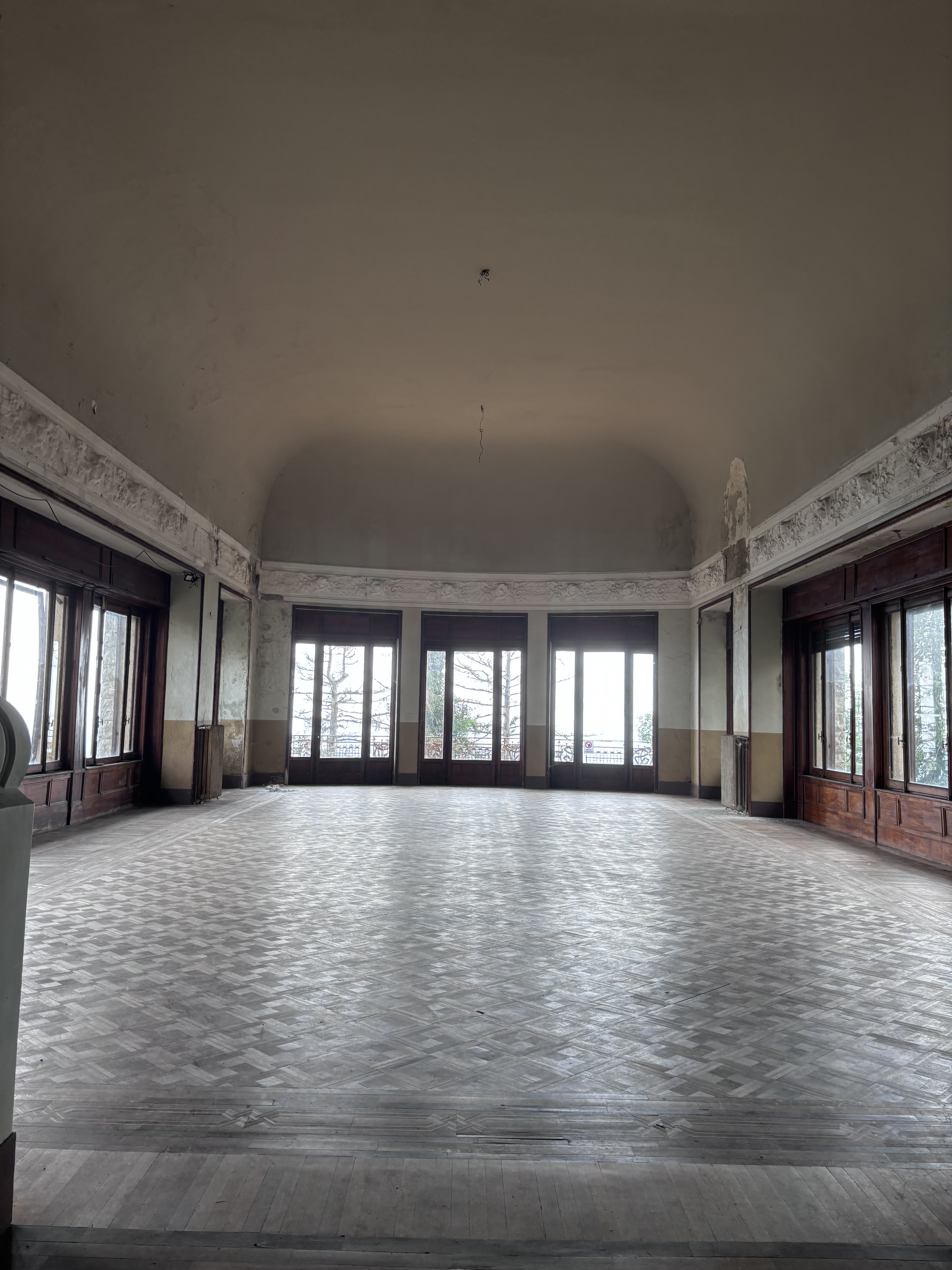
The Main Hall in 2024

During the 1980s, the Castiglioni family (owners of the Cagiva and of the Pallacanestro Varese) bought the hotel and supported the idea of re-opening. Instead they inserted antennas on the roof, which was greatly hated by locals.

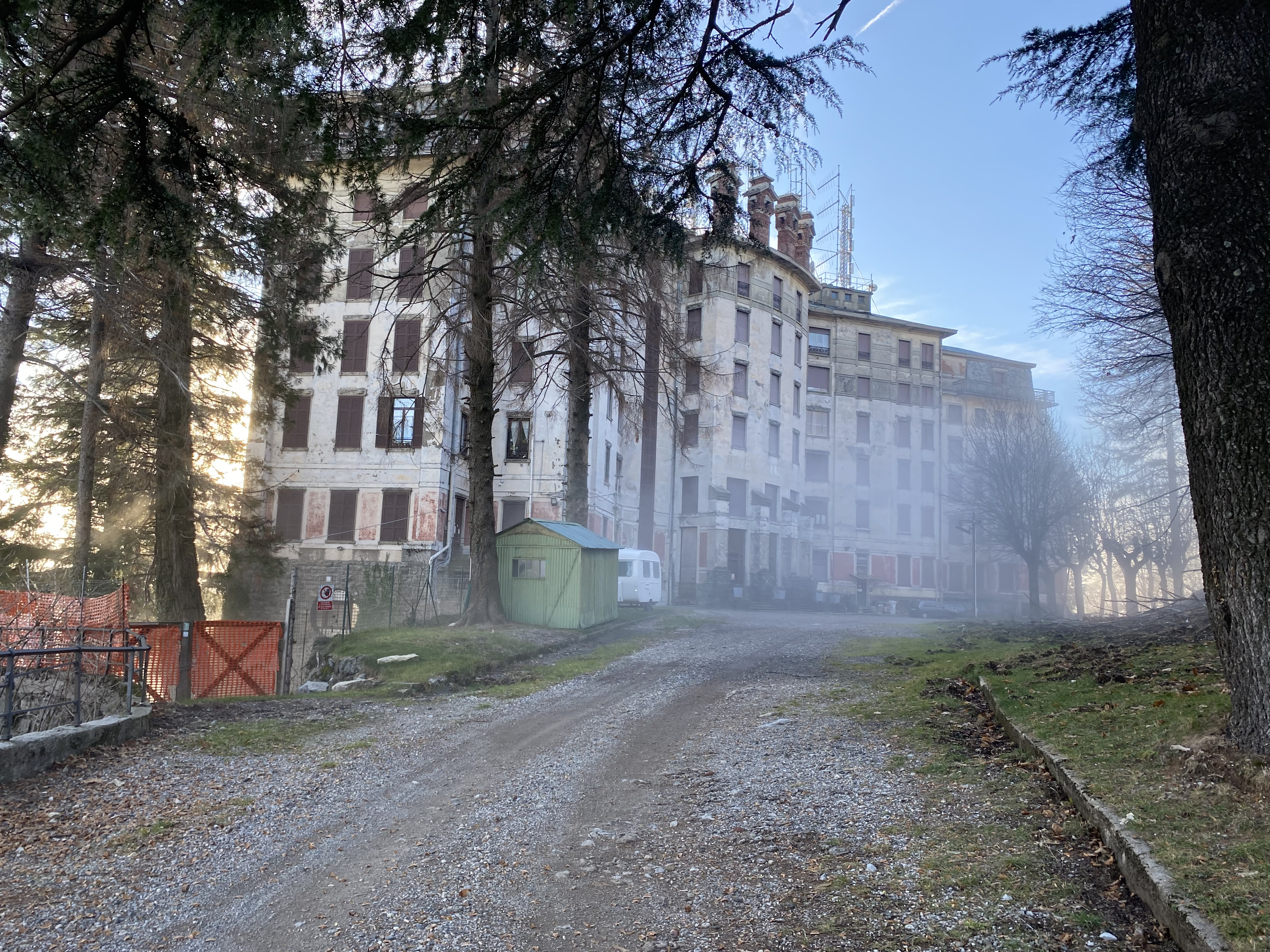
The hotel in 2022

In 2017 it served as the filming location of the film Suspiria.

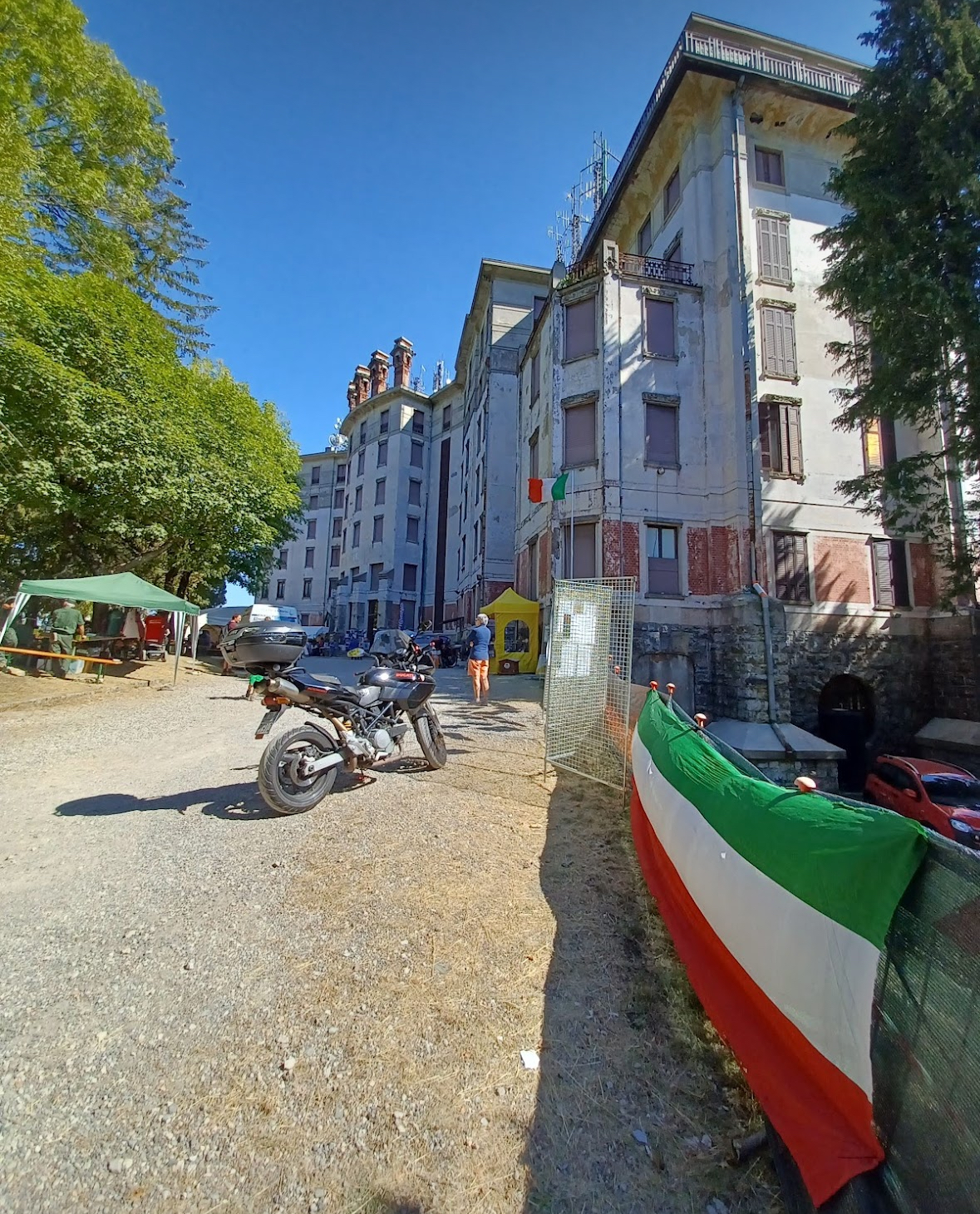
The hotel during the Alpine Festival, 2022

As of 2020, the Government of Varese has been thinking of re-opening the hotel, due to more interest and events in the city. Every August, the hotel's gardens are used for the annual Alpine festival. In 2025, a plan to reopen the hotel was revealed.

== Architecture and fittings ==
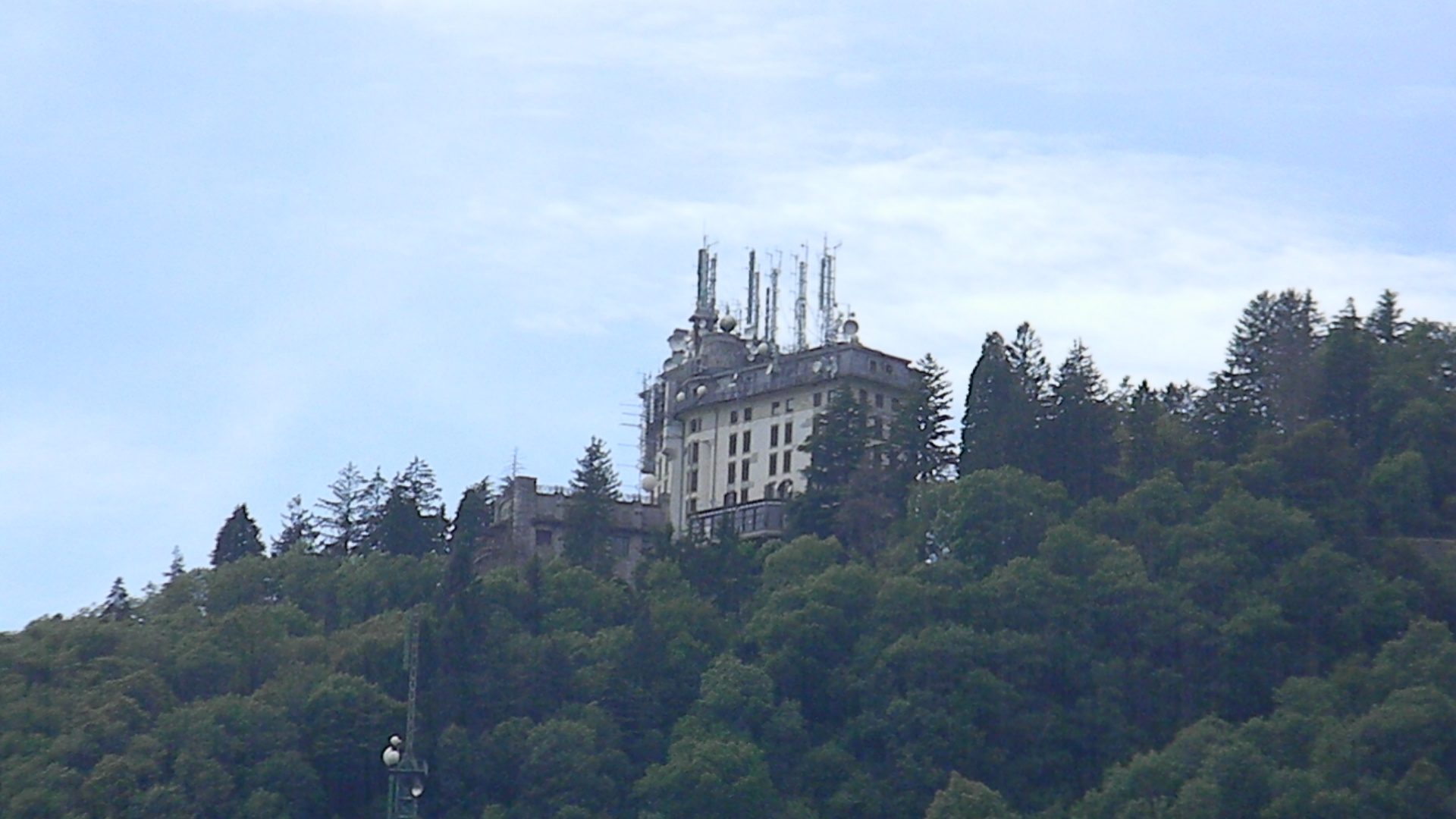
The hotel viewed from Sacro Moment

The hotel building is divided into three sectors: a central body extending towards the Varese valley and two asymmetrical, staggered side wings forming an open V towards the north. This was chosen by Sommaruga, as it looks like an Eagle taking flight.

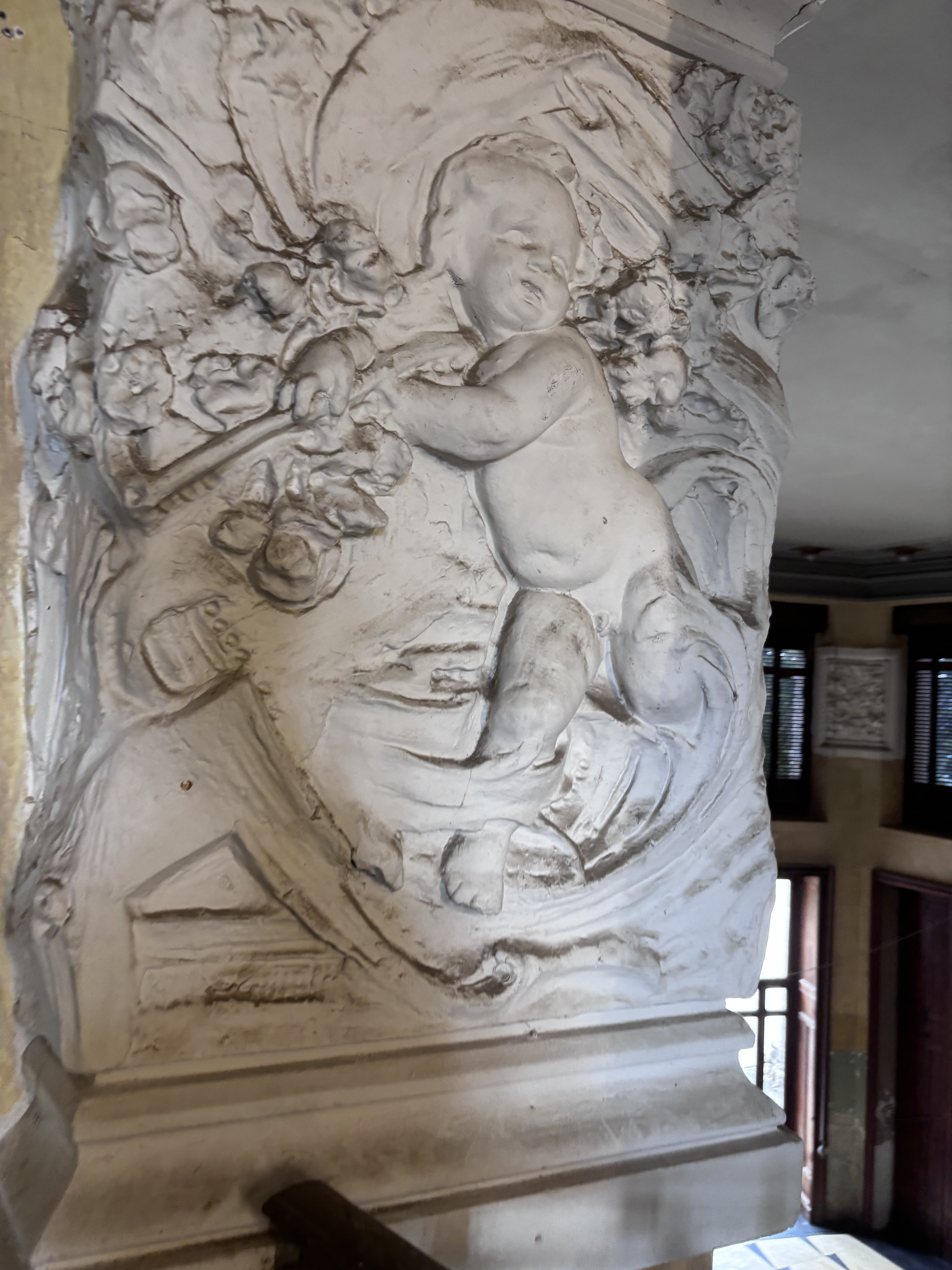
Detail of the sculptures in the lobby, 2024

As previously mentioned, the current appearance of the building is significantly marked by the repairs to the fire that destroyed the top floor: the difference between the mansard roof with its sheet metal roof and the walls below is clearly visible. On the façade, three wrought-iron lampposts, the still legible sign and the four monumental central chimneys, just above the three entrance doors, stand out. A burgundy-coloured frieze embraces the entire building at first floor level.

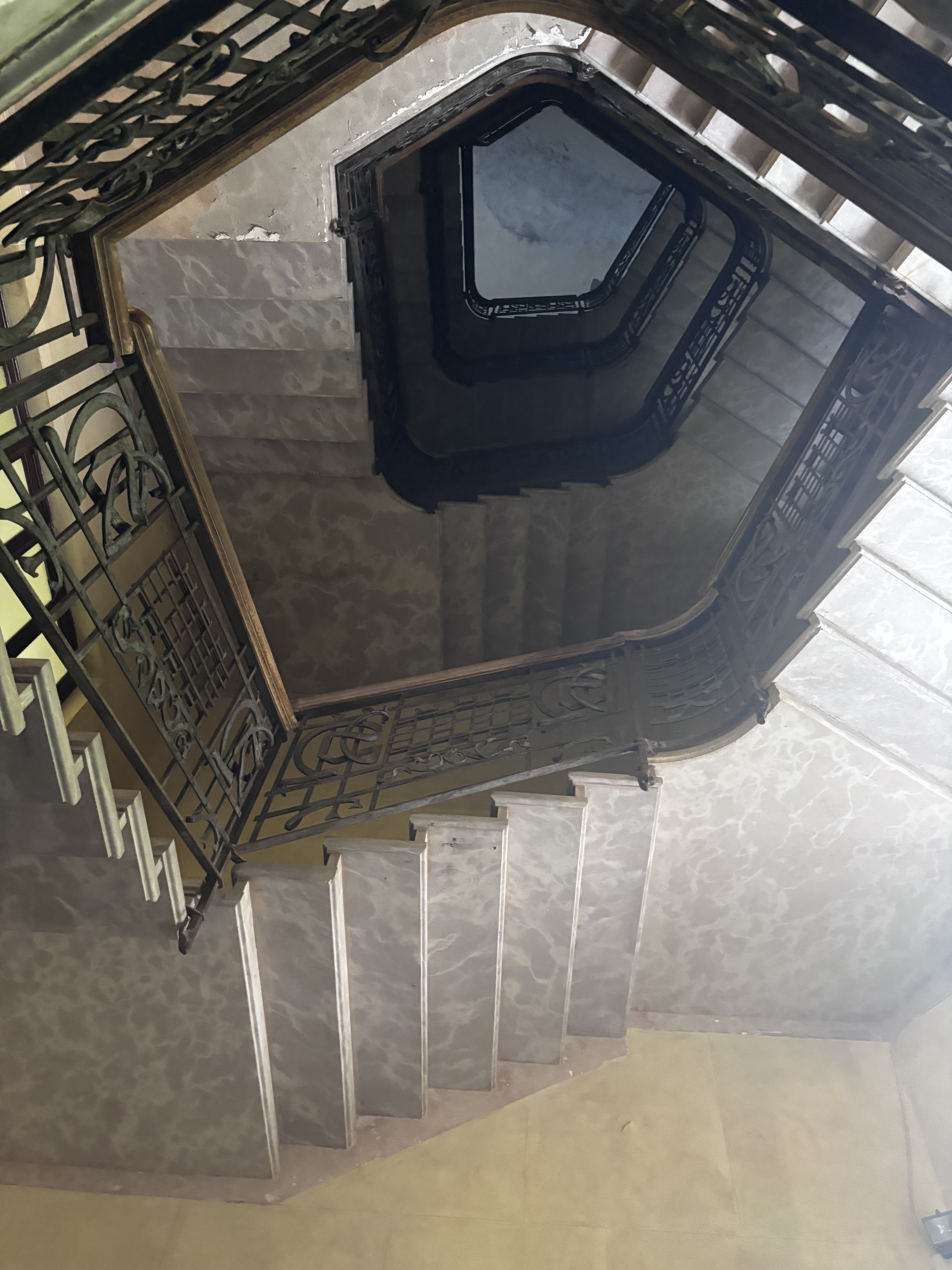
The stairwell, 2024

The rear façade is the best preserved part of the building. It is higher than the north façade, as the surrounding ground is on a lower level.

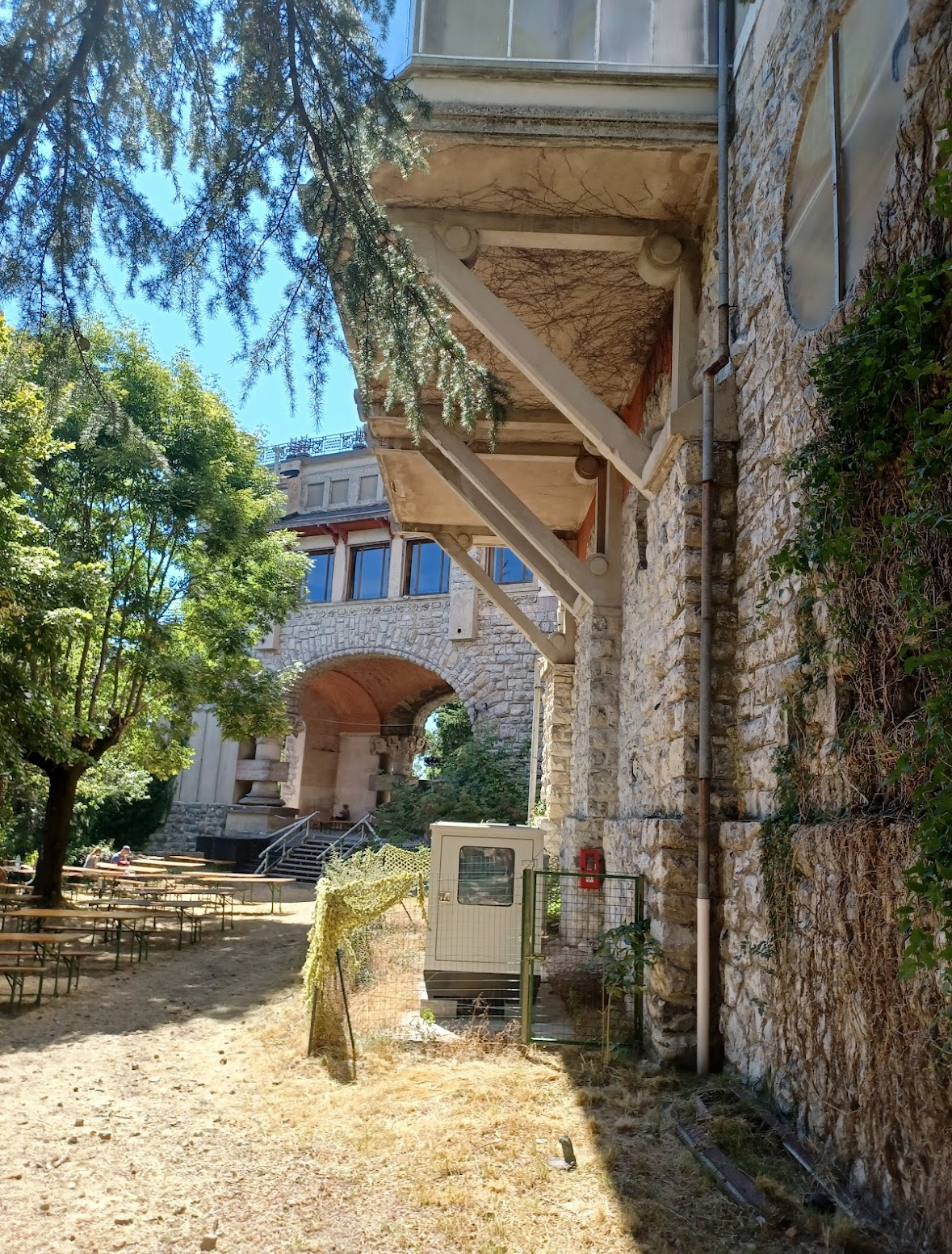
The old Entrance to the Grand Hotel Campo dei Fiori

On this front one can recognise the basement, marked by walls made of bare stone limestonea and large circular windows with grilles, which houses the rooms reserved for staff (kitchens, laundries, dormitories, etc.). In the centre of the rear façade is a majestic stone portico, leaning towards the Varese valley, which supports the ballroom and under which is the secondary entrance to the building. According to the original plan, this structure was to have been the arrival station of the funicular, but the idea was later abandoned due to the excessive noise of the engines. Noteworthy are the decorations carved in stone and cement, the elaborate wrought-iron railings and the doccioni in the shape of a dragon, the work of Alessandro Mazzucotelli and, lastly, the imposing brick vaulting, details that give the portico a mysterious 'Gothic' appearance.

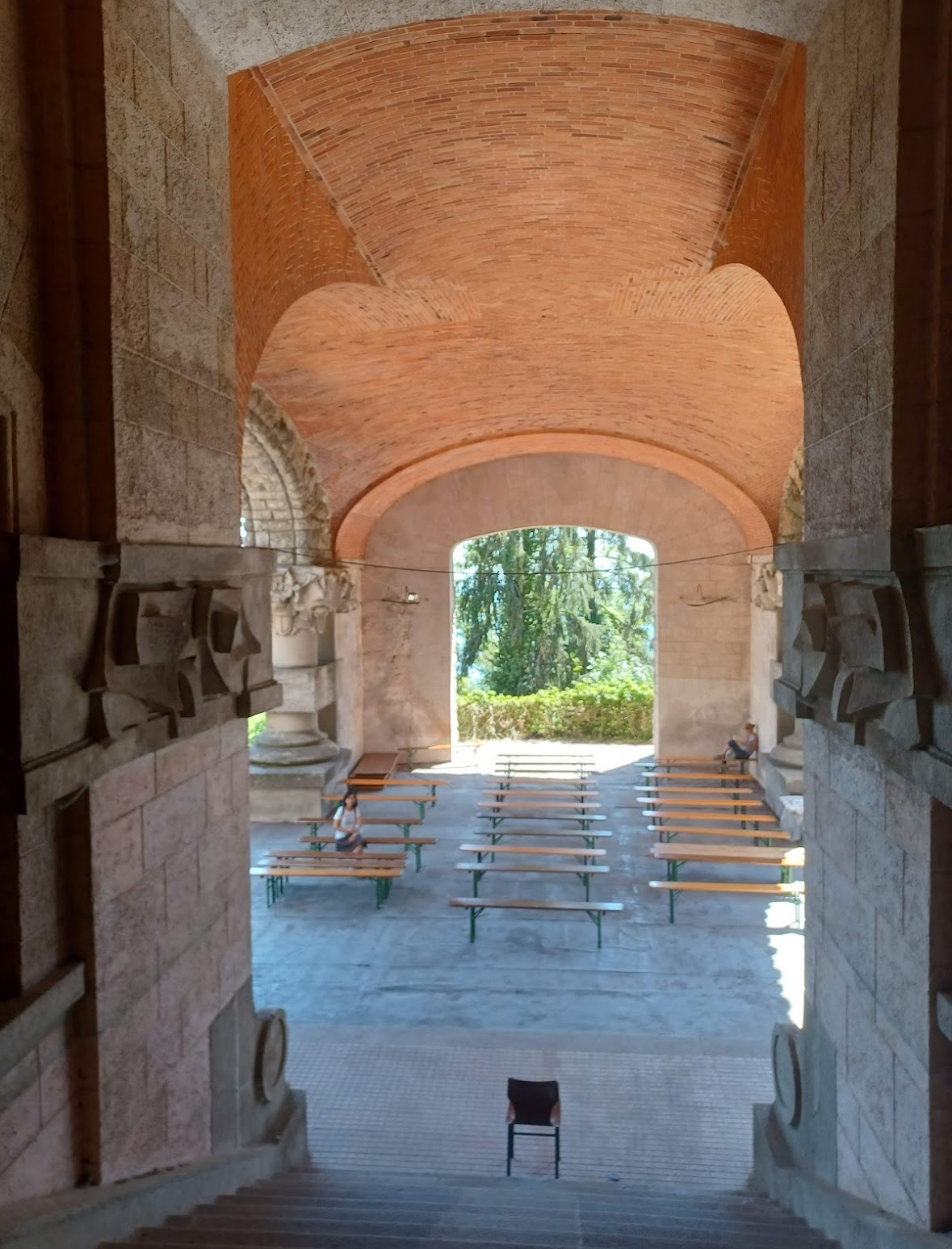
View of the veranda of the hotel

Beyond the portico, on the east wing of the building, one glimpses, on the first floor, the restaurant hall, partially built in a veranda cantilevered away from the building.

== Gallery ==
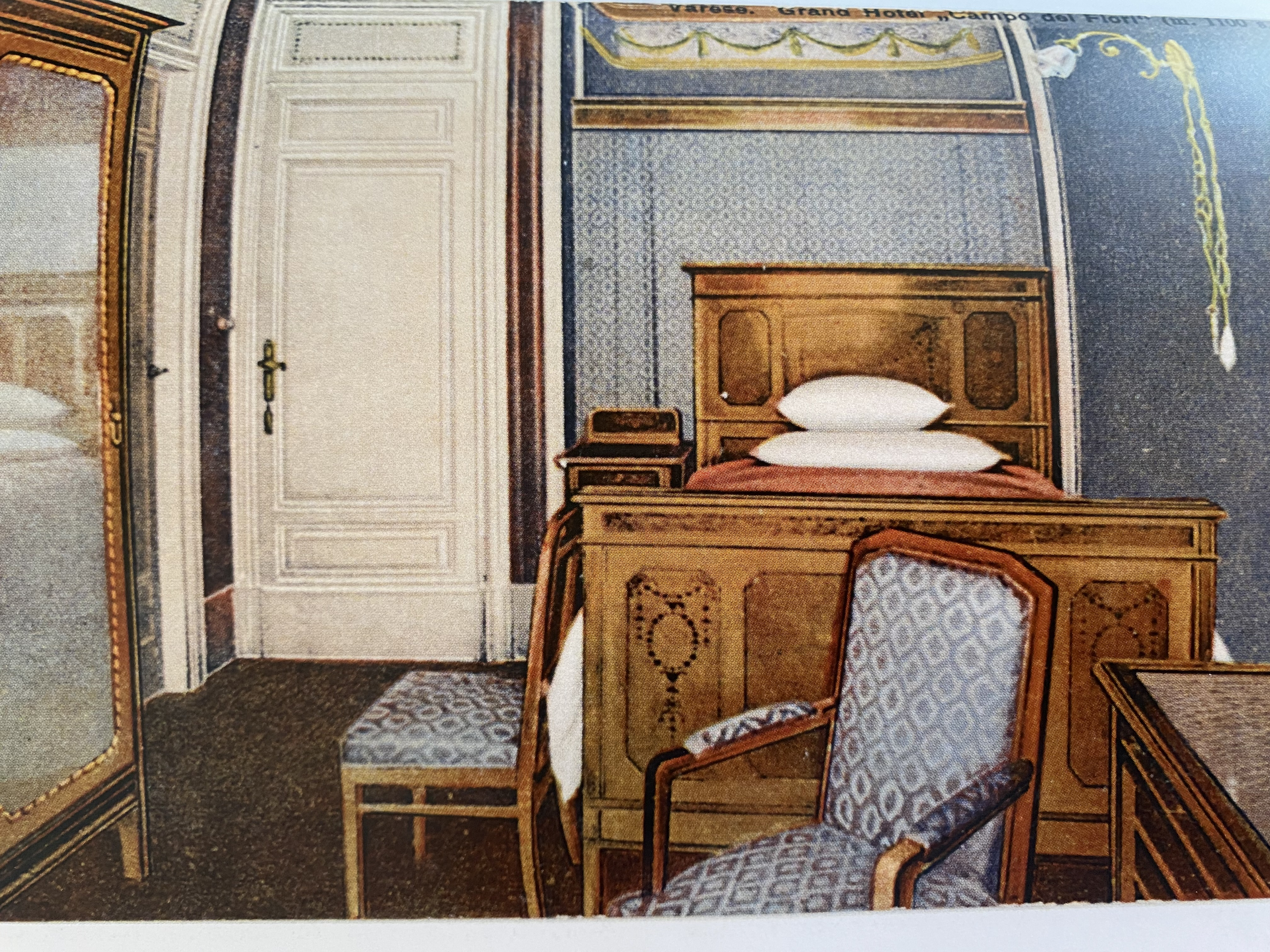
Bedroom in the Grand Hotel Campo dei Fiori in 1917

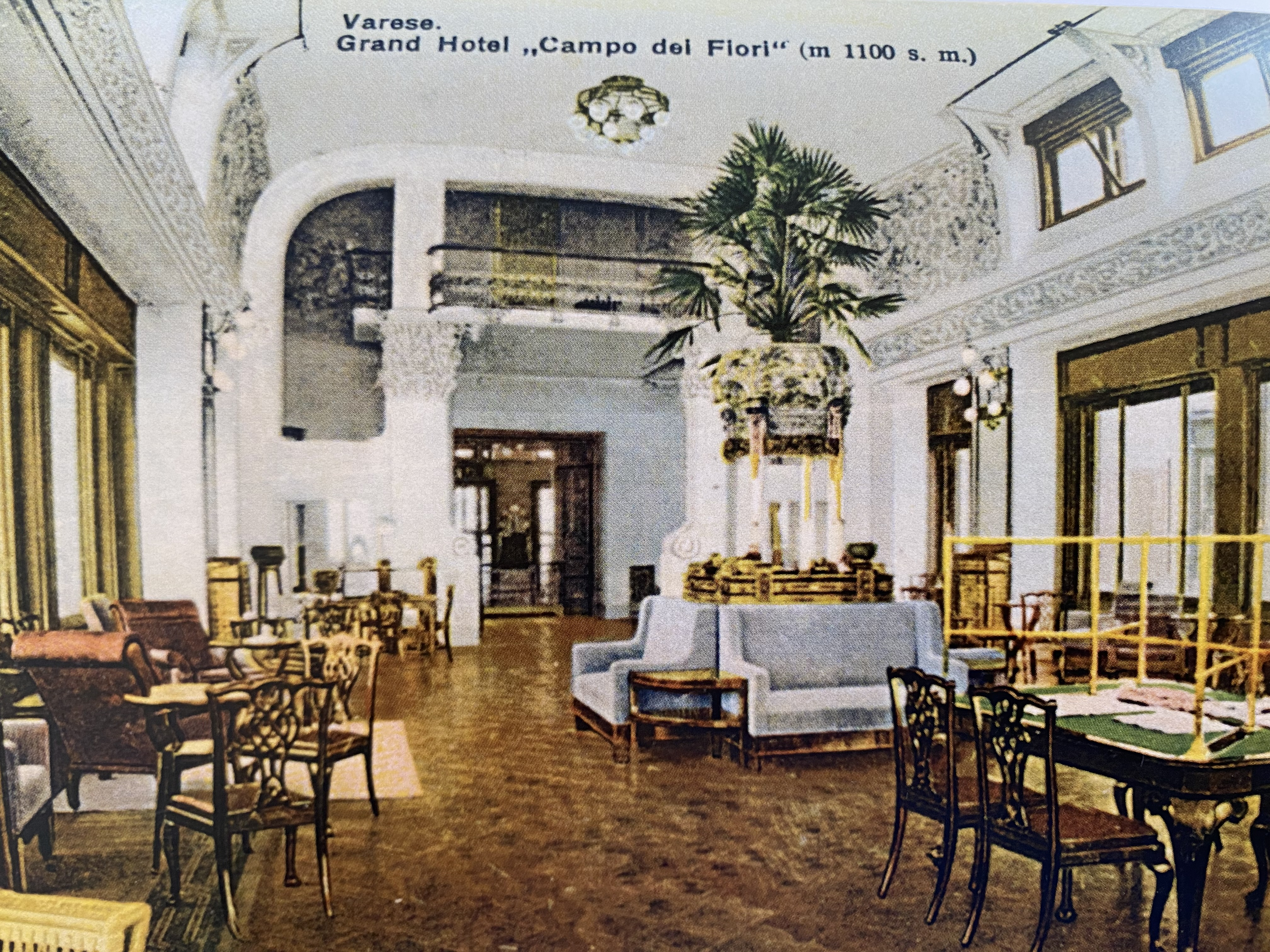
Main hall of the Grand Hotel Campo dei Fiori in 1917

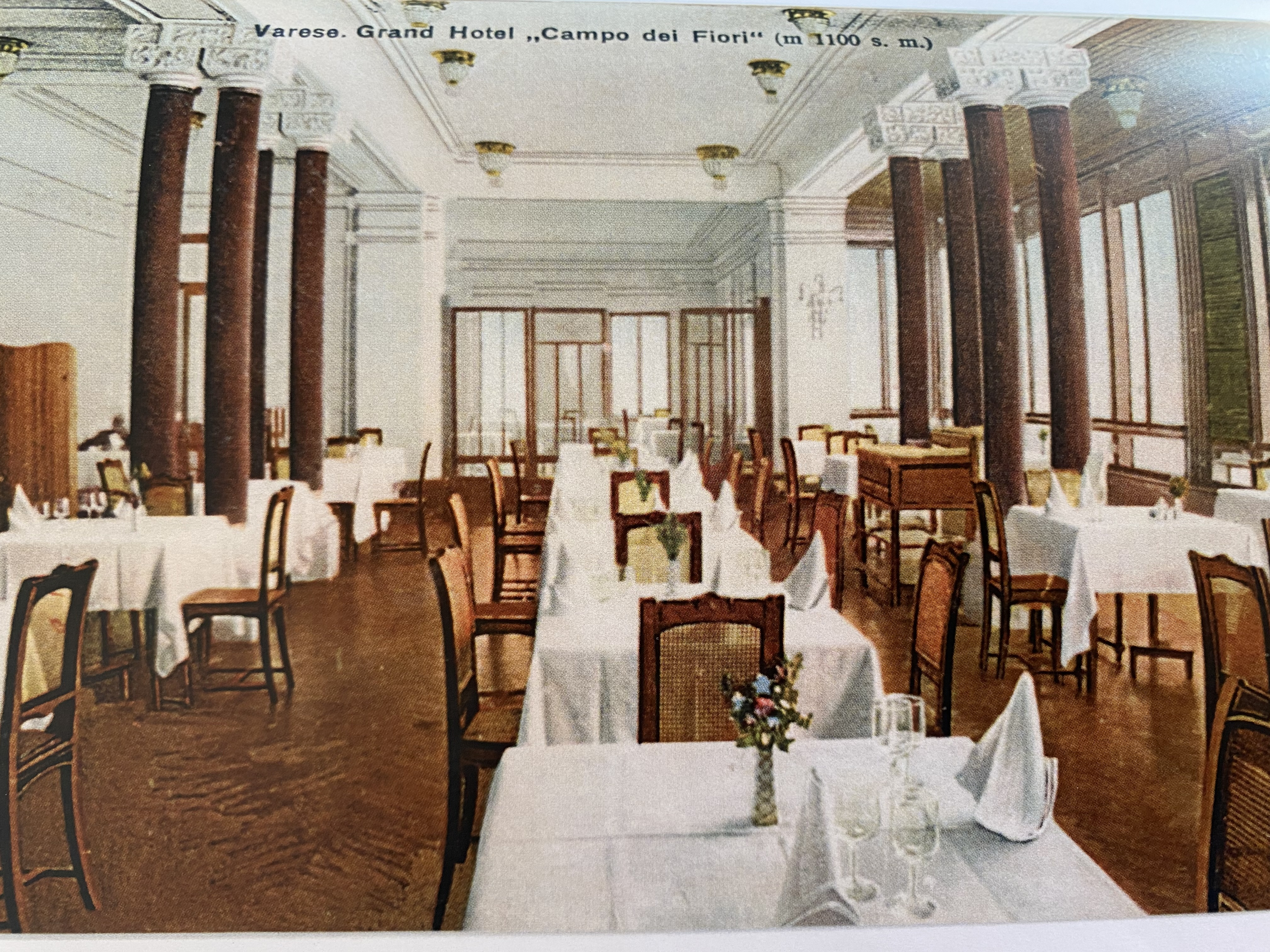
Restaurant of the Grand Hotel Campo dei Fiori in 1917

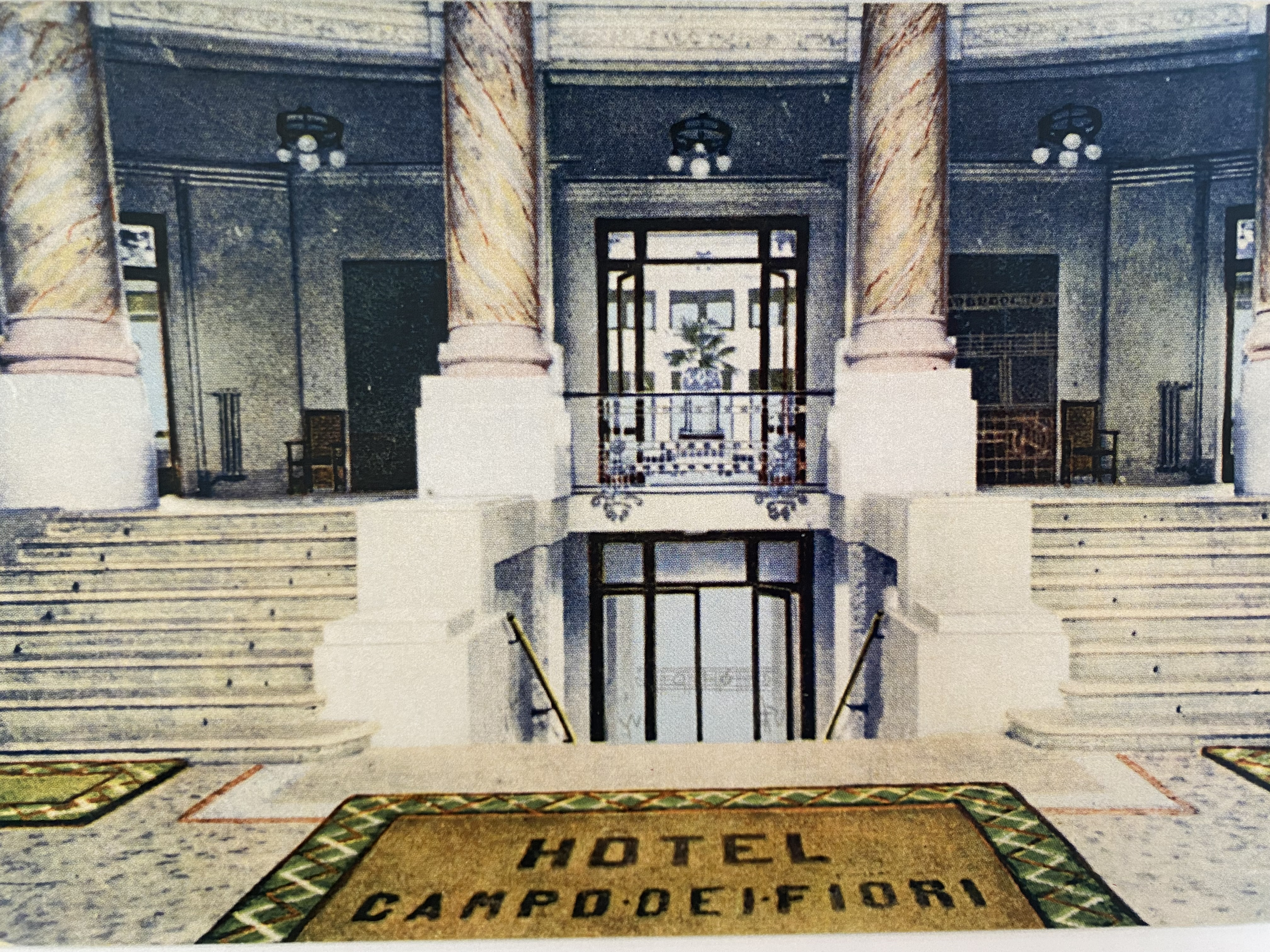
Lobby of the Grand Hotel Campo dei Fiori in 1917

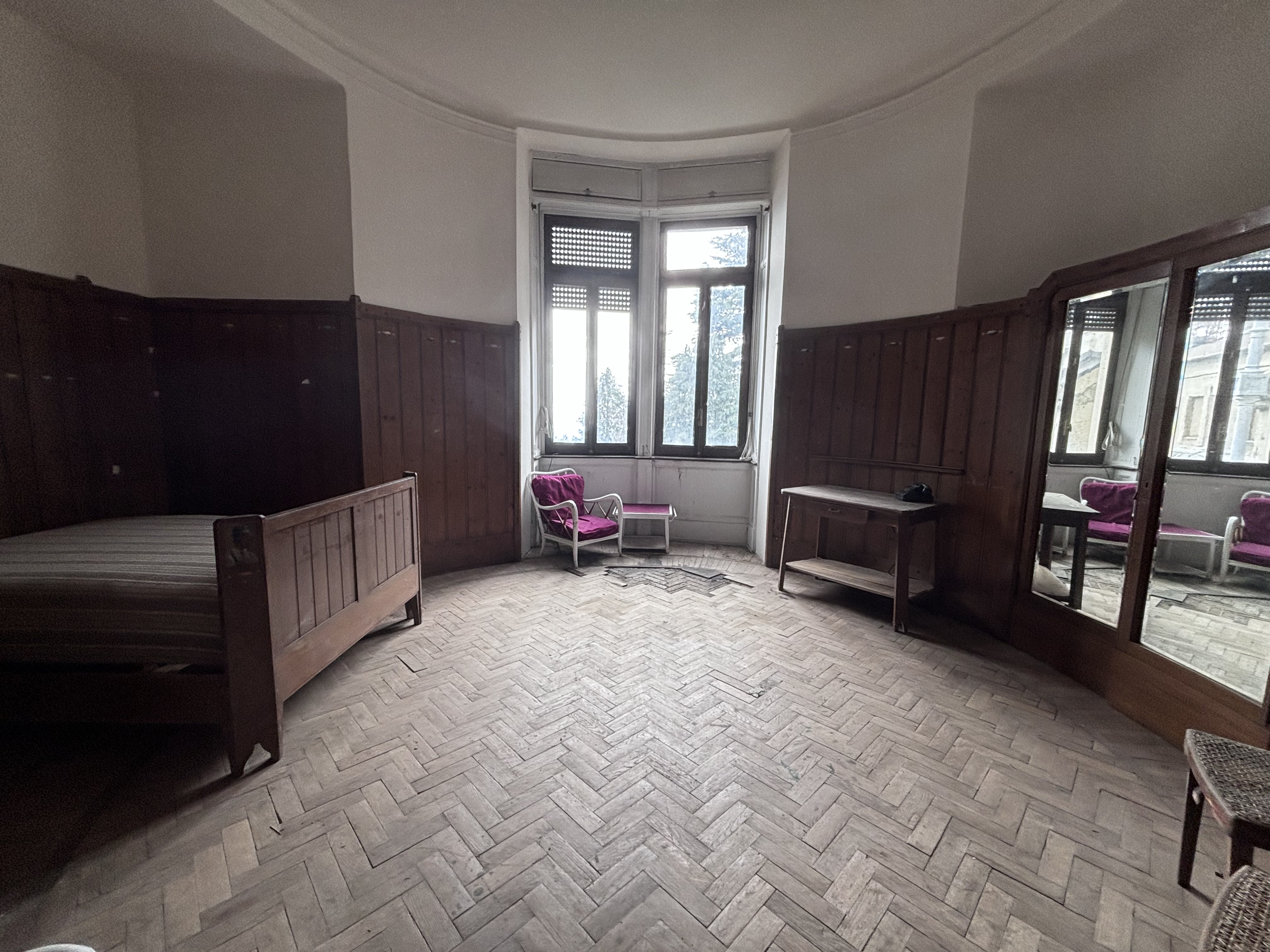
A room in the hotel, 2024

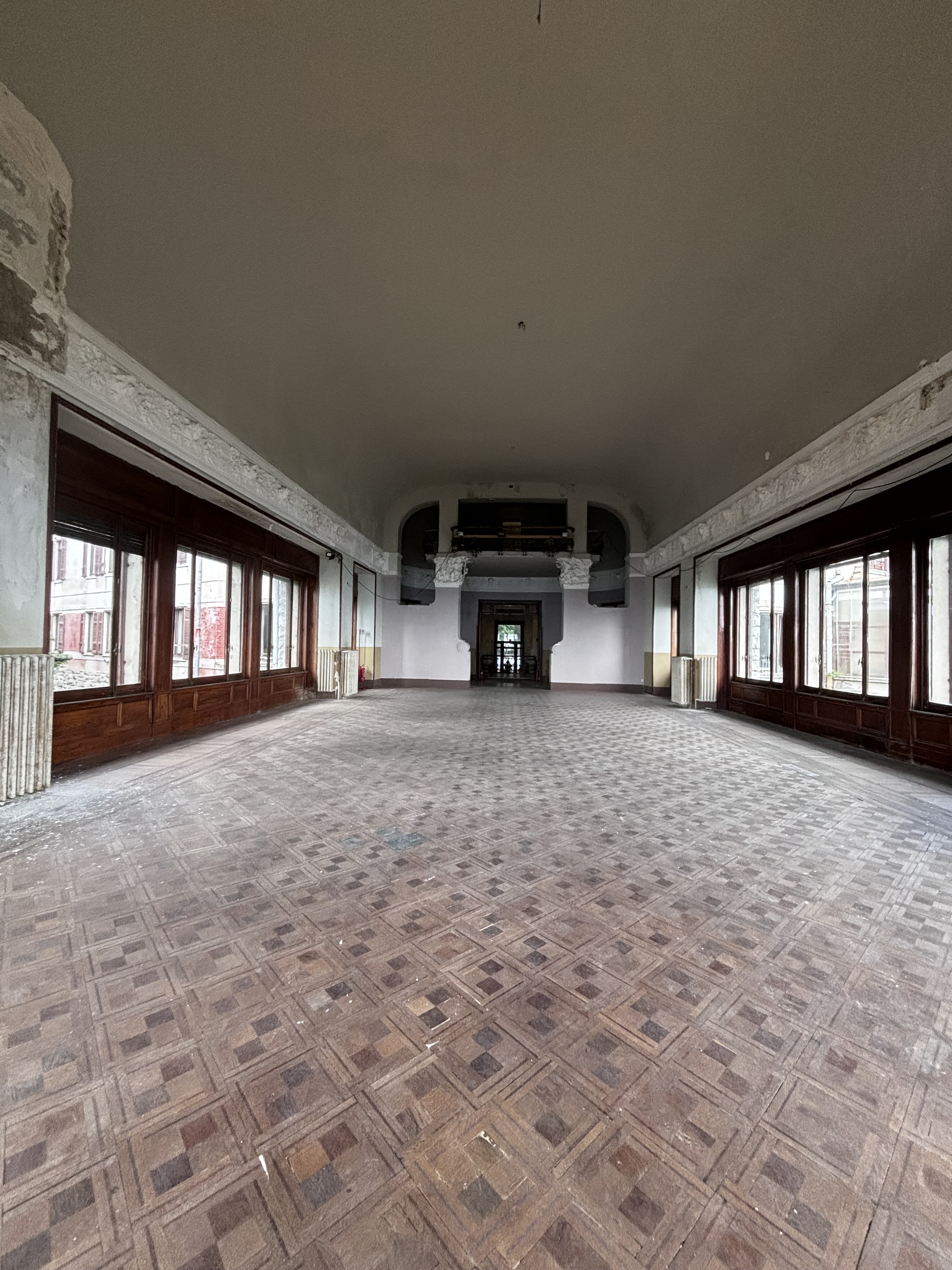
The main hall viewed from the back, 2024
