= Palazzo Castiglioni (Milan) =

Historic building in Milan, Italy

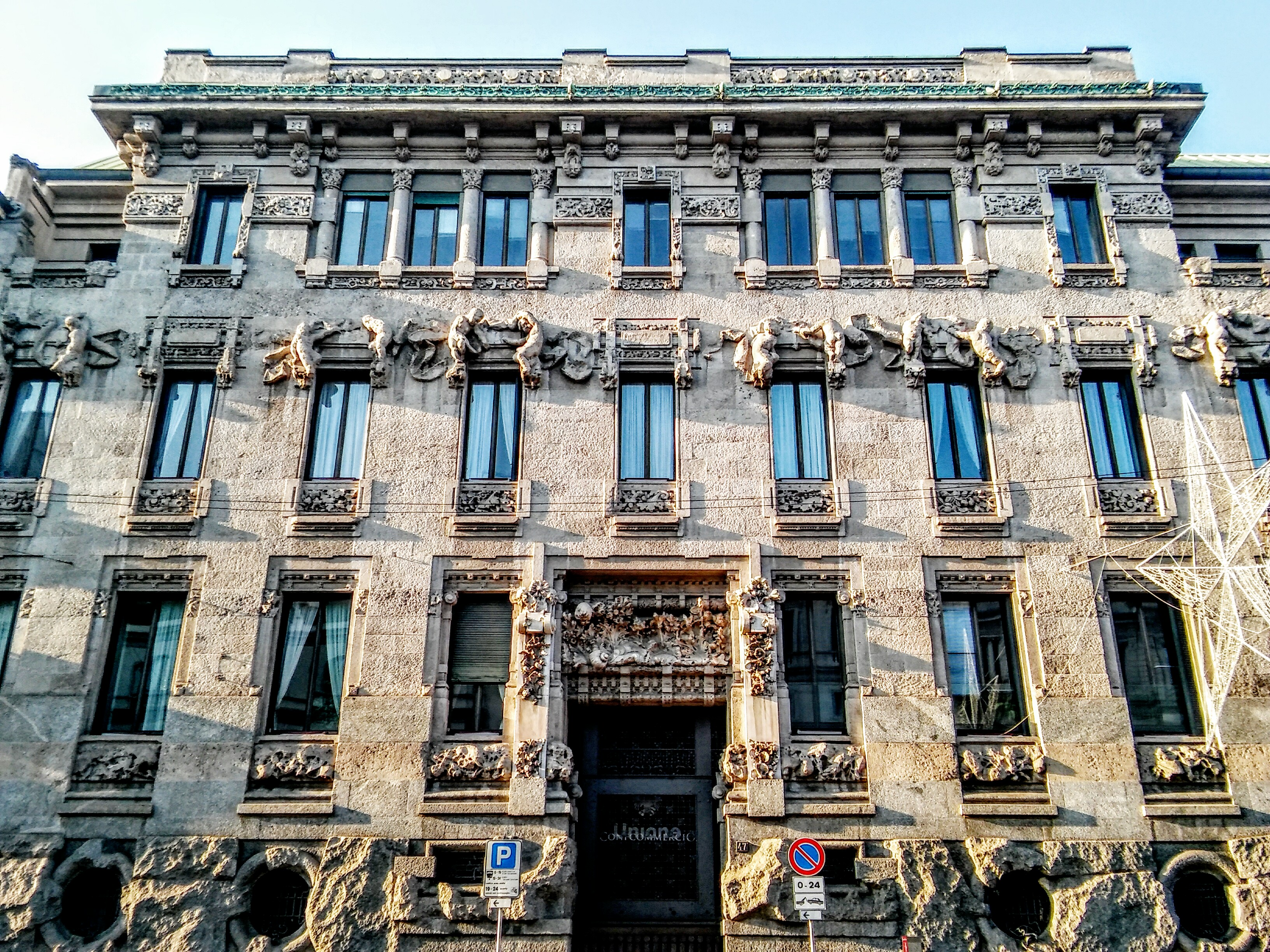

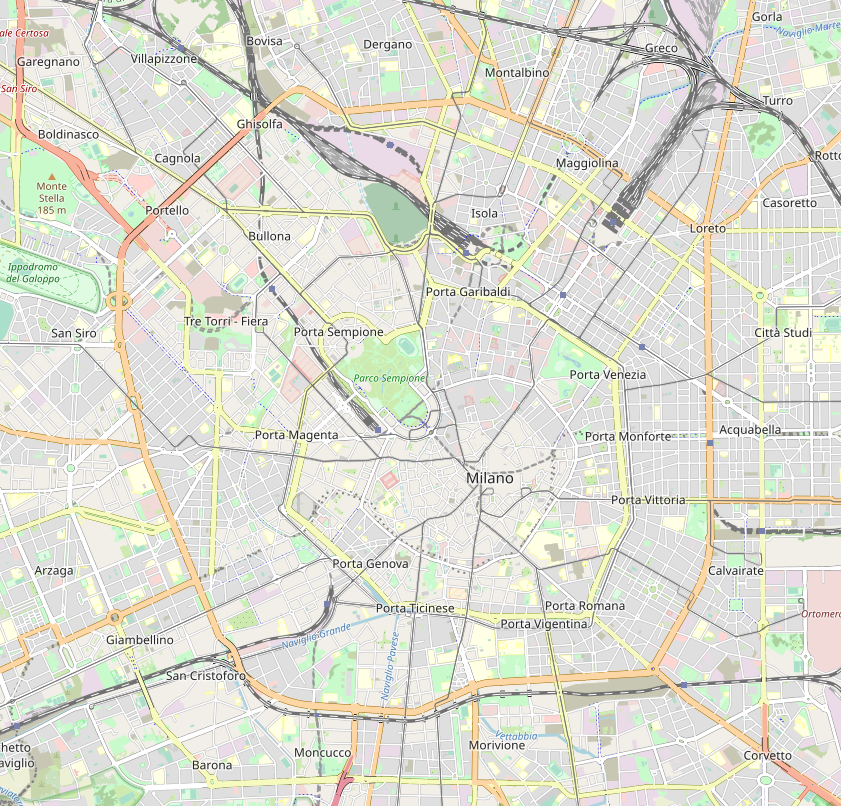
- Location within Milan Location within Italy

General information
- Architectural style: Liberty style or Art Nouveau
- Location: Milan, Italy
- Coordinates: 45°28′15.99″N 9°12′4.84″E
- Completed: 1903

Design and construction
- Architect: Giuseppe Sommaruga

Palazzo Castiglioni is an Art Nouveau palace of Milan, northern Italy. It was designed by Giuseppe Sommaruga in the Liberty style and built between 1901 and 1903. The rusticated blocks of the basement imitate a natural rocky shape, while the rest of the decorations are inspired by 18th century stuccos. The building is now used as the seat of the Unione Commercianti di Milano (Traders' Union of Milan).

== History ==
The palace was built for entrepreneur Ermengildo Castiglioni, who chose architect Giuseppe Sommaruga because of his anticonventional solutions. Castiglioni wanted the palace to reflect his wealth and grandeur; the choice of the Liberty style, a new and "trendy" style, for a building that would be located in the historic centre of Milan, was intended by Castiglioni and Sommaruga as a sort of challenge to the Milanese conservative élite. The most provocative element of the original design turned out to be a couple of nude female statues, by Ernesto Bazzaro, decorating the facade; these raised such turmoil that the local newspaper Guerin Meschino published a series of satyrical illustrations on them, and the Milanese population renamed the palace "Cà di ciapp" (in Milanese, "house of buttocks"). The statues, that were intended to represent "Peace" and "Industry", were eventually removed and are now used as decorations of another Milanese palace also by Sommaruga, the Villa Romeo Faccanoni on Via Michelangelo Buonarroti #48.

The furniture was destroyed by the US army that occupied it in 1945-46 and used it as wood for heating. Only decorations, facades, iron work and lamps were saved. The building was put under the protection of the Beaux Arts on March 5, 1957.

In 1967 the Castiglioni family sold the building to the Union of Commerce because of high costs of maintenance and a tax to finance the construction of the subway. Architect Eugenio Gerli and engineer Giorgio Keffer signed the project to transform it in an office building. They kept the entrance, the staircase, some large rooms on the first floor, the facades and the house on via Marina. The remaining part was emptied, an auditorium was built under the garden, a new building was built next to the house on via Marina. The Art Nouveau expert Rossana Bossaglia opposed the project and asked to use the building as Art Nouveau Museum. The superintendent approved the project because the Trader's Union of menaced to let the building deteriorate.

In the 150th anniversary of the birth and the 100th anniversary of the death of Arch. Sommaruga Confcomercio has organized a convention in the building on October 20, 2017, with an exhibit of pictures of the Castiglioni family and has opened it to free guided tours on October 21 and 22 ottobre from 10 am to 6 pm.

== Sources ==
- E. Bairati and D. Riva, Guide all'architettura in Italia: il Liberty in Italia, Editori Laterza.
- Pierfrancesco Sacerdoti, L'influenza di Giuseppe Sommaruga nell'architettura milanese in ITALIAN LIBERTY. Il sogno europeo della grande bellezza, a cura di Andrea Speziali, CartaCanta, 2015, pp 63–65
