= Giuseppe Sommaruga =

Italian architect

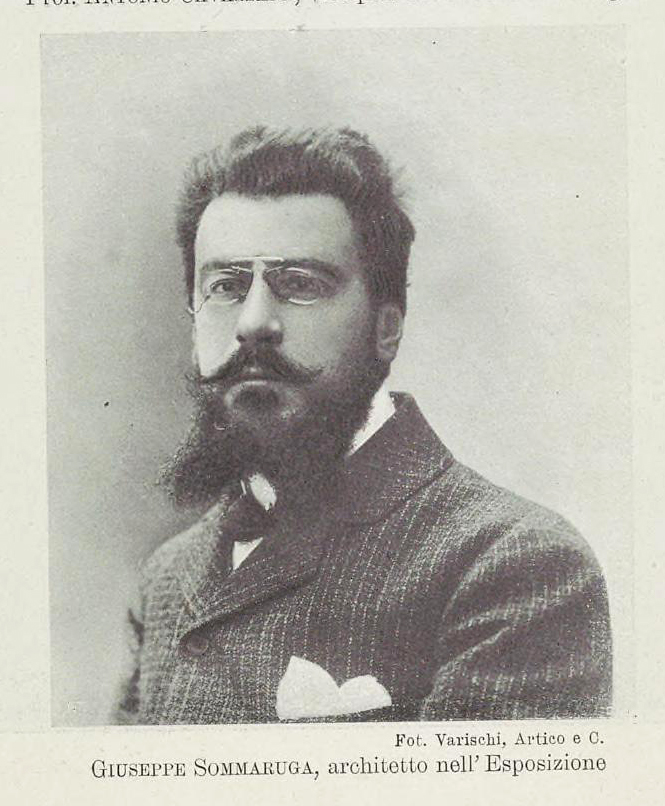
Giuseppe Sommaruga

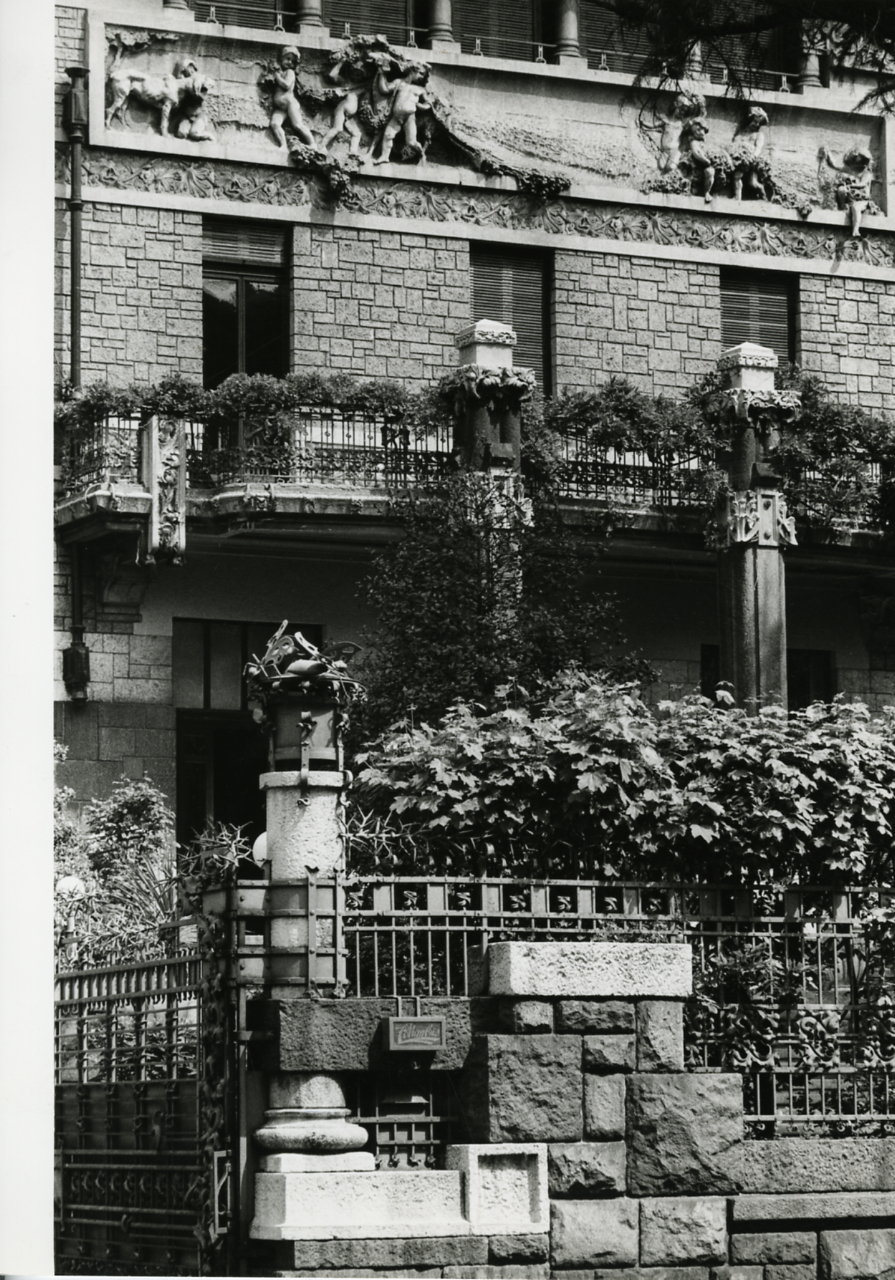
Villa Romeo Faccanoni in Milan (1911-1913). Photo by Paolo Monti.

Giuseppe Sommaruga (1867–1917) was an Italian architect of the Liberty style or Art Nouveau movement. He was the pupil of Camillo Boito and Luca Beltrami to the Brera Academy in Milan. His monumental architecture exerted some influence on the futurist architect Antonio Sant'Elia.

Some of his works:

- Grand Hotel Campo Dei Fiori in Campo dei Fiori, close to Varese (1909–1912)
- Mausoleo Faccanoni in Sarnico (1907)
- Villa Faccanoni in Sarnico
- Palazzina Salmoiraghi, Milan (destroyed)
- Palazzo Castiglioni (1901–1904) in Milan
- Villa Romeo Faccanoni (1912-1914), now part of Clinica Columbus, in Milan

== Bibliography ==
- (in Italian and English) VV.AA. Angiolo Mazzoni e l'Architettura Futurista, Supplement of CE.S.A.R. September/December 2008 (Available at "CEntro Studi Architettura Razionalista - Research centre for rationalist architecture - Notebooks". 2011. Archived from the original on 2016-03-11.)
- Andrea Speziali. Italian Liberty. Una nuova stagione dell'Art Nouveau, Risguardi, Forlì 2015
