= Guido Tallone =

Italian painter (1894–1967)

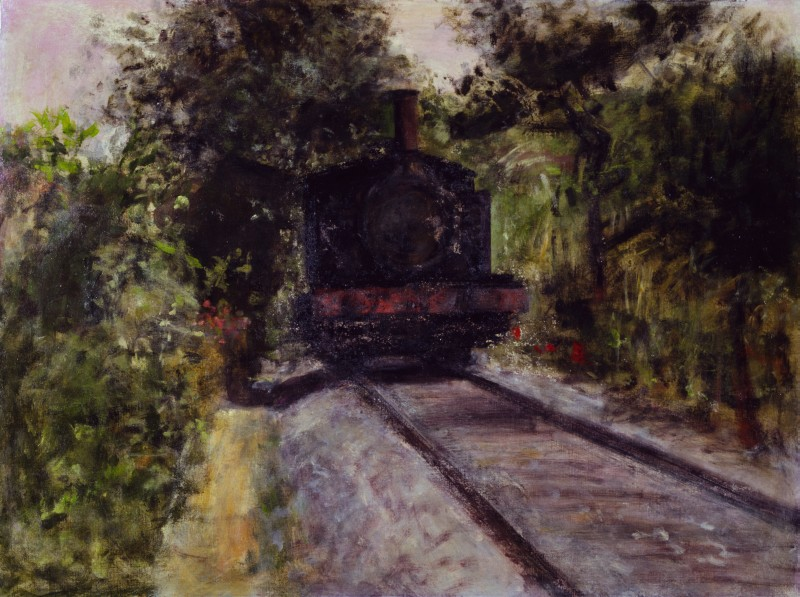
La mia locomotiva, 1961 (Fondazione Cariplo)

Guido Tallone (11 May 1894 – 30 September 1967) was an Italian painter.

== Biography ==
Tallone was born in Bergamo, Italy. Son of the painter Cesare Tallone, he took his father's courses at the Brera Academy. He fought in World War I and, after returning to Milan, continued to study painting, focusing on portraits and landscapes. The latter were frequently set in the environs of Alpignano where he and his family often used to stay in the house he inherited from his mother Eleonora Tango. He exhibited his works for the first time in the 1923 Esposizione Annuale della Società per le Belle Arti ed Esposizione Permanente in Milan. In the 1920s the artist made several productive trips to Berlin, Paris, Madrid and North Africa; he also stayed frequently in Switzerland, where he was highly rated as a portraitist. In 1930 he took part in his first Venice Biennale, where he displayed his works fairly regularly until 1948. That same year he organized a solo exhibition at the Galleria Pesaro in Milan, with the help of his gallerist brother Ermanno and the painter Aldo Carpi. After taking refuge in Venice in 1943, after the war and during the 1950s he worked in his studios in Milan and on Burano and Torcello, also travelling widely in Europe and to the United States.

== Bibliography ==
- Laura Casone, Guido Tallone, online catalogue Artgate by Fondazione Cariplo, 2010, CC BY-SA (source for the first revision of this article).

== Other projects ==
Media related to Guido Tallone at Wikimedia Commons
